= List of state media by country =

List of media where governments have authority over editorial decisions

== Africa ==
=== Algeria ===
- Établissement public de télévision
- Radio Algeria

=== Angola ===
- Televisão Pública de Angola
- Rádio Nacional de Angola

=== Benin ===
- Office de Radiodiffusion et Télévision du Bénin (ORTB)

=== Botswana ===
- Radio Botswana
- Botswana Television

=== Burkina Faso ===
- Radio Télévision du Burkina

=== Cameroon ===
- Cameroon Radio Television

=== Central African Republic ===
- Télévision Centrafricaine

=== Chad ===
- Radiodiffusion Nationale Tchadienne
  - Télé Tchad

=== Congo (Democratic Republic of) ===
- Radio-Télévision nationale congolaise
  - RTNC1 – General interest channel with national coverage
  - RTNC2 – Provincial public channel for entertainment and commercials in Kinshasa.

=== Congo (Republic of) ===
- Radiodiffusion Télévision Congolaise
  - Télé Congo

=== Côte d'Ivoire ===
- Radiodiffusion Television Ivoirienne
  - La Première (RTI)

=== Djibouti ===
- Radio Television of Djibouti

=== Egypt ===
- ERTU
  - Nile News
  - Nile TV International

=== Equatorial Guinea ===
- TVGE

=== Eritrea ===
- Eri-TV

=== Eswatini ===
- Eswatini Broadcasting and Information Service

=== Ethiopia ===
- Ethiopian Broadcasting Corporation

=== Gabon ===
- Radio Télévision Gabonaise

=== Gambia ===
- Gambia Radio & Television Service

=== Ghana ===
- Ghana Broadcasting Corporation (GBC)
- New Times Corporation
- Ghana News Agency

=== Guinea ===
- Radio Télévision Guinéenne

=== Guinea-Bissau ===
- Guinea-Bissau Television

=== Ivory Coast ===
- Radiodiffusion Television Ivoirienne (RTI)

=== Kenya ===
- Kenya Broadcasting Corporation

=== Liberia ===
- LBS

=== Libya ===
- LJBC (1977–2011)

=== Mali ===
- Office de Radiodiffusion Television du Mali (ORTM)

=== Mauritania ===
- TV de Mauritanie

=== Mauritius ===
- Mauritius Broadcasting Corporation (MB)

=== Morocco ===
- SNRT
  - Al Aoula
  - 2M
  - Arryadia
  - Athaqafia
  - Al Maghribia
  - Assadissa
  - Aflam TV
  - Tamazight TV
  - Laayoune TV
  - Medi 1 TV
  - Medi 1 Radio

=== Mozambique ===
- Rádio Moçambique
- Televisão de Moçambique

=== Namibia ===
- NBC

=== Niger ===
- Office of Radio and Television of Niger

=== Nigeria ===
- NTA
- FRCN

=== Rwanda ===
- Radio Rwanda

=== São Tomé and Príncipe ===
- TVS

=== Senegal ===
- Radiodiffusion Télévision Sénégalaise
  - Television
    - RTS1
    - RTS2

=== Sierra Leone ===
- Sierra Leone Broadcasting Corporation (SLBC)

=== Somalia ===
- Radio Mogadishu
- Somali National Television

=== South Africa ===
- Independent Media
- SABC
  - Television
    - SABC 1
    - SABC 2
    - SABC 3
    - SABC News
    - SABC Lehae
    - SABC Sport
    - SABC Encore
    - SABC Education
    - SABC Children
  - Radio (Each official language has a station)
    - SAfm (English)
    - 5FM (English)
    - Metro FM (English)
    - Radio 2000 (English)
    - Good Hope FM (English and Afrikaans)
    - tru fm (English and Xhosa)
    - RSG (Afrikaans)
    - Ukhozi FM (Zulu)
    - Umhlobo Wenene FM (Xhosa)
    - Thobela FM (Northern Sotho)
    - Lesedi FM (Sotho)
    - Motsweding FM (Tswana)
    - Phalaphala FM (Venda)
    - Munghana Lonene FM (Tsonga)
    - Ligwalagwala FM (Swazi)
    - IKwekwezi FM (Ndebele)
    - X-K FM (!Xu and Khwe) — These are not official languages but significant communities exist in the Northern Cape Province
    - Lotus FM — (English and Hindi) — Targeted at the Indian community of South Africa
    - Channel Africa

=== South Sudan ===
- South Sudan Broadcasting Corporation

=== Sudan ===
- Sudan TV

=== Tanzania ===
- TBC

=== Togo ===
- Télévision Togolaise

=== Tunisia ===
- Radio Tunisienne
  - Radio Tunis
  - Radio Tunis Chaîne Internationale (RTCI)
  - Radio Culture
  - Radio Jeunes
  - Five local stations, in El Kef, Gafsa, Monastir, Sfax, Tataouine and Grand Tunis
- Télévision Tunisienne
  - El Watania 1
  - El Watania 2

=== Uganda ===
- Uganda Broadcasting Corporation (UBC)

=== Western Sahara ===
- RASD TV
- Radio Nacional de la R.A.S.D.

=== Zambia ===
- Zambia National Broadcasting Corporation

=== Zimbabwe ===
- Zimbabwe Broadcasting Corporation

== Americas ==
=== Argentina ===
- Contenidos Públicos
  - Encuentro
  - Pakapaka
- Radio y Televisión Argentina
  - Canal 7 Buenos Aires – Ciudad de Buenos Aires, Argentina
  - Canal 10 – Tucumán — Tucumán, Argentina
  - Canal 10 – Rio Negro — Rio Negro, Argentina
  - Canal 10 – Córdoba — Córdoba, Argentina
  - Radio Nacional 870 AM
  - Radiodifusión Argentina al Exterior
  - Radio Nacional Rock
  - Radio Nacional Clásica
  - Radio Nacional Folklórica

=== Bahamas ===
- ZNS Broadcasting Corporation

=== Barbados ===
- Caribbean Broadcasting Corporation

=== Bolivia ===
- Bolivia TV
- Bolivia TV 7.2
- Radio Frecuencia Policial
- Radio Illimani/Red Patria Nueva
- Radio Vanguardia/SNRPO
- TV Culturas
- TVU (Canal 13)

=== Brazil ===
- Empresa Brasil de Comunicação
  - TV Brasil — Rio de Janeiro, Brasília, São Paulo and broadcast affiliates
  - TV Brasil Internacional — Available in Africa, Americas, Portugal and Japan by cable and satellite
  - TV Brasil Play
  - Rádio Nacional — Rio de Janeiro, Brasília (also available in Belo Horizonte, Recife and São Paulo), North Region and Tabatinga
  - Rádio MEC — Rio de Janeiro and Brasília
- Fundação Padre Anchieta
  - TV Cultura — São Paulo and broadcast affiliates.
  - MultiCultura — São Paulo
  - Univesp TV — São Paulo
  - TV Rá-Tim-Bum – Children's channel, nationwide by cable and satellite.
  - Rádio Cultura FM — São Paulo
  - Rádio Cultura Brasil — São Paulo

=== Canada ===
- Canada Gazette
- CHU (radio station)
- Gazette officielle du Québec
- Ontario Gazette

=== Chile ===
- Televisión Nacional de Chile — Chile (National)
- TV Chile
- NTV
- 24 Horas
- TVN3

=== Colombia ===
==== National ====
- Radio Televisión Nacional de Colombia
  - Señal Colombia
  - Canal Institucional
  - Radio Nacional de Colombia
  - Radiónica
  - Emisoras de Paz (Peace stations, mandated by 2016 Peace agreement)
- Radio Policía Nacional (operated by the National Police)
- Colombia Estéreo (operated by the Army)
- Marina Estéreo (operated by the Marines)

==== Regional ====
- Radio Televisión Nacional de Colombia
  - Canal Trece
- Teleantioquia
- Telecafé
- Teleislas
- Televisión Regional del Oriente
- Telecaribe
- Telepacífico

==== Local ====
- Canal Capital
- Telemedellín

=== Costa Rica ===
- Canal 13 (SINART)

=== Cuba ===
- Cuban Institute of Radio and Television
  - Cubavisión

=== Dominican Republic ===
- Dominica Broadcasting Corporation

=== Ecuador ===
- Ecuador TV

=== El Salvador ===
- Canal 10 (Televisión de El Salvador) — El Salvador (National)

=== Greenland ===
- Kalaallit Nunaata Radioa

=== Guatemala ===
- Guatevisión

=== Guyana ===
- National Communications Network (NCN)

=== Haiti ===
- Radio Télévision Nationale d'Haïti

=== Honduras ===
- Comisión Nacional de Telecomunicaciones

=== Mexico ===
- Sistema Público de Radiodifusión del Estado Mexicano
- Canal Once (TV; 1959)
  - Once Niños
- Canal Catorce (TV; 2012)
- Canal 22 (TV; 1982)

=== Nicaragua ===
- Radio Nicaragua
- Canal 4
- Canal 6
- TN8
- Viva Nicaragua

=== Panama ===
- Panama National Television

=== Paraguay ===
- Paraguay TV
  - Canal 14 de Asunción, Paraguay
  - PyTV News (cable television only)
  - Canal 10 de San Pedro
  - Canal 12 de Pilar
  - Canal 19 de Río Paraguay
- Cadena de Radio Nacional del Paraguay
  - Radio Nacional 920 AM
  - Eadio Nacional 95.1 FM
  - Radio Nacional San Pedro
  - Radio Nacional Carlos Antonio López de Pilar

=== Peru ===
- National Institute of Radio and Television of Peru
  - TV Perú
  - Radio Nacional del Perú

=== Puerto Rico ===
- Puerto Rico Public Broadcasting Corporation
  - WIPR (AM)
  - WIPR-FM
  - WIPR-TV

=== United States of America ===
- United States Agency for Global Media
  - Voice of America
  - Radio Free Europe/Radio Liberty
  - Radio Free Asia
  - Radio y Televisión Martí
  - Middle East Broadcasting Networks
- ”TRUMP TV”

=== Uruguay ===
- Televisión Nacional Uruguay
  - UyTV News (cable television only)
  - Canal 5 de Montevideo, Uruguay
  - Canal 10 de Salto
  - Canal 12 de Rocha
  - Canal 21 de Río Uruguay
- Cadena de Radio Nacional del Uruguay
  - Radio Clasica
  - Radio Uruguay
  - Radio Cultura (previously Emisora del Sur)
  - Babel FM

=== Venezuela ===
- Radio Nacional de Venezuela
- Venezolana de Televisión
- TVes
- ViVe (Visión Venezuela)
- teleSUR

== Asia ==
=== Abkhazia ===
- Abkhazian State Television and Radio Broadcasting Company

=== Afghanistan ===
- Salam Watandar Radio Network
- Radio Television Afghanistan

=== Azerbaijan ===
- İTV
- İctimai Radio

=== Bahrain ===
- Bahrain Radio and Television Corporation

=== Bangladesh ===
- Bangladesh Betar
- Bangladesh Television
  - BTV Dhaka
  - BTV Chittagong
  - BTV News
  - Sangsad Television

=== Bhutan ===
- Bhutan Broadcasting Service
  - BBS 1
  - BBS 2
  - BBS 3

=== Brunei ===
- Radio Television Brunei (RTB)
  - Television:
    - RTB Perdana
    - RTB Aneka
    - RTB Sukmaindera
  - Radio:
    - Nasional FM
    - Pelangi FM
    - Pilihan FM
    - Harmoni FM
    - Nur Islam

=== Cambodia ===
- National Television of Cambodia
- TVK2

=== China ===
- China Media Group (中央广播电视总台 "中国之声/总台"|CMG) (sometimes categorized as "state broadcaster" rather than "public broadcaster")
  - Television:
    - National:
      - China Central Television (中国中央电视台 "中央电视台/中央台/央视"|CCTV)
        - National:
          - CCTV-1 (综合频道)
          - CCTV-2 (财经频道)
          - CCTV-3 (综艺频道)
          - CCTV-5 (体育频道)
          - CCTV-6 (电影频道)
          - CCTV-7 (国防军事频道)
          - CCTV-8 (电视剧频道)
          - CCTV-9 (纪录频道)
          - CCTV-10 (科教频道)
          - CCTV-11 (戏曲频道)
          - CCTV-12 (社会与法频道)
          - CCTV-13 (新闻频道)
          - CCTV-14 (少儿频道)
          - CCTV-15 (音乐频道)
          - CCTV-16 (奥林匹克频道)
          - CCTV-17 (农业农村频道)
          - CCTV-5+ (体育赛事频道)
          - CCTV-4K
          - CCTV-8K
        - International:
          - CCTV-1 Hong Kong and Macau — Broadcast in Hong Kong and Macau
          - CCTV-4 (中文国际频道) — International (in Chinese)
            - CCTV-4 Asia – Broadcast for Asia and Australia except Japan
            - CCTV-4 Europe – Broadcast for Europe and Africa and broadcast HD in France
            - CCTV-4 America – Broadcast for North America and South America
          - CCTV-Daifu — In both Chinese and Japanese (broadcast Japan)
          - CCTV Entertainment – Entertainment International (in Chinese)
          - China Movie Channel – Movies (CPC owned channel)
    - International:
      - China Global Television Network (中国国际电视台 "中国环球电视网"|CGTN)
        - CGTN
        - CGTN French
        - CGTN Spanish
        - CGTN Russian
        - CGTN Arabic
        - CGTN Documentary
  - Radio:
    - National:
      - China National Radio (中央人民广播电台 "中央台/央广"|CNR)
        - National:
          - CNR-1 (News radio)
          - CNR-2
          - CNR-3
        - State:
          - CNR-4
          - CNR-5 (News radio for Taiwan)
          - CNR-6 (Entertainment radio for Taiwan)
          - CNR-7 (Main broadcast based in Guangdong-Hong Kong-Macau Greater Bay Area)
          - CNR-8
          - CNR-9
          - CNR-10
          - CNR-11
          - CNR-12
          - CNR-13
          - CNR-14 / RTHK 6 Hong Kong Radio (Main broadcast based in Hong Kong)
          - CNR-15
          - CNR-16
          - CNR-17
    - International:
      - China Radio International (中国国际广播电台 "国际台"|CRI)
        - Easy FM
        - Hit FM
        - News Radio
        - NEWS Plus
        - Voice of the South China Sea
        - CRI Global Services
- China Education Television (中国教育电视台|CETV)
  - CETV1
  - CETV2
  - CETV3
  - CETV4

=== Georgia ===
- Georgian Public Broadcasting

=== Hong Kong ===
- Radio Television Hong Kong (香港電台|RTHK)
  - RTHK TV31
  - RTHK TV32
  - RTHK TV33 (relay of CCTV-1)
  - RTHK TV34 (relay of CGTN Documentary)
  - RTHK TV35 (relay of CGTN)
  - RTHK Radio 1
  - RTHK Radio 2
  - RTHK Radio 3
  - RTHK Radio 4
  - RTHK Radio 5
  - China National Radio Voice of Hong Kong Channel (relay of China National Radio Voice of Hong Kong Channel)
  - RTHK Mandarin Channel
  - China Media Group Radio The Greater Bay (relay of China Media Group Radio The Greater Bay)

=== India ===
- Prasar Bharati
  - All India Radio
    - AIR FM Gold (in Metro cities)
    - AIR FM Rainbow (in Metro cities)
    - AIR Live News 24x7 (in Metro cities)
    - AIR Urdu (in Metro cities)
    - Gyan Vani (in Metro cities)
    - Raagam (in Metro cities)
      - AIR FM Tragopan - Nagaland
    - Vividh Bharati (in Metro cities)
  - Doordarshan
    - National:
      - DD National - Entertainment
      - DD News - News
      - DD Sports - Sports
      - DD Science - science and Technology
      - DD Bharati - Arts and Culture
      - DD Kisan - Agriculture
      - DD Urdu
      - DD Retro - Entertainment
      - DD Gyan Darshan - Education
    - State:
      - DD Arunprabha - Arunachal Pradesh
      - DD Assam - Assam
      - DD Bangla - West Bengal
      - DD Bihar - Bihar
      - DD Chandana - Karnataka
      - DD Chhattisgarh - Chhattisgarh
      - DD Dadra and Nagar Haveli - Dadra and Nagar Haveli
      - DD Daman and Diu - Daman and Diu
      - DD Girnar - Gujarat
      - DD Goa - Goa (Non 24x7)
      - DD Haryana - Haryana (Non 24x7)
      - DD Himachal Pradesh - Himachal Pradesh
      - DD Jharkhand - Jharkhand
      - DD Kashir - Jammu and Kashmir
      - DD Madhya Pradesh - Madhya Pradesh
      - DD Malayalam - Kerala
      - DD Manipur - Manipur (Non 24x7)
      - DD Meghalaya - Meghalaya (Non 24x7)
      - DD Mizoram - Mizoram (Non 24x7)
      - DD Nagaland - Nagaland (Non 24x7)
      - DD Odia - Odisha
      - DD Pondicherry - Puducherry
      - DD Punjabi - Punjab
      - DD Rajasthan - Rajasthan
      - DD Sahyadri - Maharashtra
      - DD Saptagiri - Andhra Pradesh
      - DD Sikkim - Sikkim
      - DD Tamil - Tamil Nadu
      - DD Tripura - Tripura
      - DD Uttar Pradesh - Uttar Pradesh
      - DD Uttarakhand - Uttarakhand
      - DD Yadagiri - Telangana
    - International:
      - DD India - English News
- Sansad TV - Parliament

=== Indonesia ===
- Radio Republik Indonesia (RRI)
  - National:
    - RRI Programa 3
    - Only digital based:
      - RRI EWS
      - RRI Jazz Channel
      - RRI Kanal Kenangan
      - RRI Suara Dangdut
  - Local:
    - RRI Programa 1 – local stations
    - RRI Programa 2 – local stations
    - RRI Programa 4 – local stations
    - RRI IKN (based in the Capital City of Nusantara)
  - International: Voice of Indonesia
- Televisi Republik Indonesia (TVRI)
  - National:
    - TVRI Nasional
    - TVRI Sport
  - Local: TVRI regional stations — 35 stations
  - International: TVRI World
- Local public broadcasting institutions

=== Iran ===
- IRIB

=== Iraq ===
- Al Iraqiya
- Alahad TV (funded by Quds Force)

==== Iraqi Kurdistan ====
- Kurdistan 24

=== Jordan ===
- Jordan Radio and Television Corporation (JRTV)
- Al Mamlaka

=== Kazakhstan ===
- Qazaqstan

=== Kuwait ===
- Kuwait Television
  - KTV1
  - KTV2
  - KTV Sport
  - KTV Sport Plus
  - KTV Kids
  - Al Qurain channel
  - Al Araby Channel
  - Ethraa Channel
  - Al Majles Channel

=== Kyrgyzstan ===
- Public Broadcasting Corporation of the Kyrgyz Republic

=== Lebanon ===
- Télé Liban
- Radio Lebanon

=== Laos ===
- Lao National Radio (LNR)
- Lao National Television (LNTV)

=== Malaysia ===
- Radio Televisyen Malaysia (RTM)
  - Television:
    - National:
      - TV1
      - TV2
      - TV Okey
      - Berita RTM
      - Sukan+
      - RTM World
  - Radio:
    - National:
      - Ai FM (Chinese)
      - Nasional FM (Malay)
      - Radio Klasik (Malay)
      - TraXX FM (English)
      - Minnal FM (Tamil) (West Malaysia only)
      - Asyik FM (West Malaysia only)
    - State:
      - Johor FM
      - Kedah FM
      - Kelantan FM
      - KL FM
      - Melaka FM
      - Mutiara FM
      - Negeri FM
      - Pahang FM
      - Perak FM
      - Perlis FM
      - Red FM
      - Sabah FM
      - Sarawak FM
      - Selangor FM
      - Terengganu FM
    - Local:
      - Bintulu FM
      - Keningau FM
      - Labuan FM
      - Langkawi FM
      - Limbang FM
      - Miri FM
      - Sabah Vfm
      - Sandakan FM
      - Sibu FM
      - Sriaman FM
      - Tawau FM
      - Wai FM

=== Macau ===
- Teledifusão de Macau (澳門廣播電視股份有限公司 "澳廣視"|TDM)
  - Television:
    - Local:
      - TDM Ou Mun (澳視澳門) — Free-to-air in Cantonese
      - Canal Macau (澳視葡文) — Free-to-air in Portuguese and English
      - TDM Sport (澳視體育) — Sports programs
      - TDM Information (澳視資訊) — News and financial information programs
      - TDM Entertainment (澳視綜藝) — Variety and entertainment
      - TDM Macau World (澳視衛星頻道) — International channel
    - Mainland:
      - CCTV-1 (Hong Kong and Macau) (中國中央電視台綜合頻道港澳版) — Relayed of CCTV-1
      - CCTV-5 (中國中央電視台體育頻道) — Relayed of CCTV-5
      - CCTV-13 (中國中央電視台新聞頻道) — Relayed of CCTV-13
      - CGTN (中國環球電視網主頻道) — Relayed of CGTN
      - CGTN Documentary (中國環球電視網紀錄頻道) — Relayed of CGTN Documentary
  - Radio:
    - Rádio Macau in Cantonese (澳門電台中文頻道)
    - Rádio Macau in Portuguese (澳門電台葡文頻道)

=== Mongolia ===
- Mongolian National Broadcaster

=== Myanmar ===
- Myanmar Radio and Television

=== Nepal ===
- Nepal Television (NTV) — Nepal
  - NTV PLUS
  - NTV News
  - NTV Kohalpur
  - NTV Itahari
  - Radio Nepal

=== North Korea ===
- Korean Central Broadcasting Committee (KCBC)
  - Korean Central Television (KCTV)
  - Korean Central Broadcasting Station (KCBS)
  - Voice of Korea (VOK)

=== Pakistan ===
- Pakistan Television Corporation
  - PTV Home
  - PTV News
  - PTV Sports
  - PTV National
  - AJK TV
  - PTV Bolan
  - PTV Global
  - PTV Parliament
  - PTV Teleschool
  - Pakistan TV
- Radio Pakistan

=== Palestine ===
- Palestinian Broadcasting Corporation
  - Voice for Palestine

=== Philippines ===
- People's Television Network (PTV)
- Presidential Broadcast Service (PBS)
- Radio Philippines Network (RPN)
- Intercontinental Broadcasting Corporation (IBC)

=== Qatar ===
- Qatar General Broadcasting and Television Corporation (QGBTC)
  - Qatar Radio
  - Qatar Television
- Al Jazeera Media Network
  - Al Jazeera Arabic
  - Al Jazeera Mubasher
  - Al Jazeera Balkans

=== Saudi Arabia ===
- Saudi Broadcasting Authority
  - Al Saudiya
  - Al Ekhbariya
  - Al Riyadiya
  - Quran TV
  - Sunnah TV
- Al Arabiya (based in Dubai)

=== Singapore ===
- Mediacorp
  - Television:
    - Suria (Malay)
    - 5 (English)
    - U (Mandarin)
    - 8 (Mandarin)
    - Vasantham (Tamil)
    - CNA (English)
  - Radio:
    - BBC World Service (English) (relayed on BBC World Service London)
    - RIA 897 (Malay)
    - GOLD 905 (English)
    - SYMPHONY 924 (English)
    - YES 933 (Mandarin)
    - CNA938 (English)
    - WARNA 942 (Malay)
    - CLASS 95 (English)
    - CAPITAL 958 (Mandarin)
    - OLI 968 (Tamil)
    - LOVE 972 (Mandarin)
    - 987 (English)

=== South Korea ===
- Korean Broadcasting System (한국방송공사|KBS)
  - KBS1
  - KBS2
  - KBS News 24
  - KBS UHD
  - KBS Life
  - KBS Drama
  - KBS N Sports
  - KBS Joy
  - KBS Kids
  - KBS Story
  - KBS World
    - KBS America
    - KBS World 24
    - KBS World Indonesia
    - KBS World Japan
    - KBS World Latino
    - KBS World TV
  - KBS Radio 1
  - KBS Radio 2
  - KBS Radio 3
  - KBS Classic FM
  - KBS Cool FM
  - KBS Hanminjok Radio
  - KBS World Radio
- Educational Broadcasting System (한국교육방송공사|EBS)
  - EBS1
  - EBS2
  - EBS Plus 1
  - EBS Plus 2
  - EBS English
  - EBS Kids
  - EBS FM

=== Sri Lanka ===
- Sri Lanka Rupavahini Corporation
  - Channel Eye
  - Nethra TV
  - Rupavahini
- Sri Lanka Broadcasting Corporation
  - City FM
  - Kothmale FM / Kotmale Community Radio
  - Pirai FM (Muslim)
  - Vidula
  - SLBC Commercial Service (Velanda Sevaya)
  - Thendral FM
  - Radio Sri Lanka
  - SLBC National Service (Swadeshiya Sevaya)
  - SLBC National Service State Tamil
  - SLBC Regional Service (Dabana)
  - SLBC Regional Service (Jaffna)
  - SLBC Regional Service (Kandurata Sevaya)
  - SLBC Regional Service (Rajarata Sevaya)
  - SLBC Regional Service (Ruhunu Sevaya)
  - SLBC Regional Service (Uva)
  - SLBC Regional Service (Wayamba Handa)
  - SLBC Sports Service
- Independent Television Network
  - ITN Channel
  - Vasantham TV
  - Prime TV
  - Vasantham FM
  - Prime Radio
  - ITN FM (formerly Lakhanda radio)

=== Syria ===
- Syrian Television

=== Tajikistan ===
- Televizioni Tojikiston

=== Thailand ===
- Thai PBS (HD 3)
  - Thai PBS Podcast (Radio Online)
- Royal Thai Army Radio and Television (TV5 HD)
  - TV 5 Radio (Bangkok Stations)
    - FM 94.0 and 103.5 MHz
    - DAB+ Radio Test Project (VHF Channel 6 - 6C:185.360 MHz)
- MCOT
  - MCOT Radio
    - Lukthung Mahanakhon (Thai; first FM radio station in Thailand) – 95.00 MHz
    - Khluen Khwam Khit (Thai) – 96.50 MHz
    - Active Radio (Thai) – 99.00 MHz
    - 100.5 News Network (Thai) – 100.50 MHz
    - Smooth FM (Thai and English) – 105.50 MHz
    - Met 107 (English) – 107.00 MHz
    - Provincial and regional
      - 41 stations
  - MCOT HD
- National Broadcasting Services of Thailand (NBT)
  - Radio Thailand
    - Radio Thailand for Learning and Warning Network (Formerly Known as National Education Radio)
    - Radio Thailand World Service
  - NBT Digital 2 HD
    - NBT Regional 11 (Separate broadcasting on 4 areas but HD only Central Area TV Program Chart)
  - NBT World (owner by National News Bureau of Thailand and since 2022 to present broadcast only on Internet TV)
- Bangkok Broadcasting & Television Company Limited Channel 7 (7 HD)
- Ministry of Education (through the Department of Learning Encouragement)
  - MOE RadioThai (FM 92.00 MHz)
  - ETV(Thailand)
- The National Assembly Radio and Television Broadcasting Station (TPChannel)
  - TP Radio (or Radio Parliament)
  - TPTV (10)
- Radio Thailand Satun

=== Taiwan ===
- Central News Agency (Taiwan)
  - Focus Taiwan
- Ministry of Foreign Affairs Media
  - Taiwan Today (今日台灣)
  - Taiwan Panorama (台灣光華雜誌)
- Radio Taiwan International

=== Turkmenistan ===
- Coordinating Council for Television and Radio Broadcasting
  - Turkmenistan

=== United Arab Emirates ===
- Abu Dhabi Media
  - Abu Dhabi TV
  - Al-Emarat TV
  - Abu Dhabi Sports Channel
  - Yas TV
  - Quran Kareem
  - Emarat FM
  - Abu Dhabi FM
  - Star FM
  - Abu Dhabi Classic FM
  - Kadak FM
  - Radio 1
  - Radio 2
- Dubai Media Incorporated
  - Dubai TV (Arabic)
  - Dubai One (English)
  - Noor Dubai TV
  - Sama Dubai
  - Dubai Sports
  - Dubai Racing
  - Dubai Drama
  - Dubai Radio
  - Noor Dubai Radio
  - Emirates 24/7

=== Uzbekistan ===
- National Television and Radio Company of Uzbekistan

=== Vietnam ===
- Vietnam Television (VTV – Đài Truyền hình Việt Nam)
  - VTV1
  - VTV2
  - VTV3
  - VTV4
  - VTV5
    - VTV5 Tây Nam Bộ
    - VTV5 Tây Nguyên
  - VTV6
  - VTV7
  - VTV8
  - VTV9
  - VTV10
  - Vietnam Today
- Voice of Vietnam (VOV – Đài Tiếng nói Việt Nam)
  - VOV1
  - VOV2
  - VOV3
  - VOV4
  - VOV5 (VOV World)
  - VOV6
  - VOV Giao thông
  - VOV FM 89MHz
  - VOV English 24/7
- 64 Local Broadcasters

=== Yemen ===
- Yemen TV

== Europe ==
=== Albania ===
- RTSH
- Albanian Telegraphic Agency

=== Andorra ===
- Ràdio i Televisió d'Andorra

=== Armenia ===
- Public Television Company of Armenia
- Public Radio of Armenia
- Armenpres

=== Belarus ===
- Belarus National State Broadcasting

=== Bosnia and Herzegovina ===
- Radio and Television of Bosnia and Herzegovina (BHRT)
- Radio-Television of the Federation of Bosnia and Herzegovina (RTVFBiH) (Federation of Bosnia and Herzegovina)
- Radio Televizija Republike Srpske (RTRS) (Republika Srpska)

=== Bulgaria ===
- BNT
  - BNT 1
  - BNT 2
  - BNT 3
  - BNT 4
- BNR
  - BNR 1
  - BNR 2
  - BNR 3

=== Croatia ===
- HRT
  - HRT 1
  - HRT 2
  - HRT 3
  - HRT 4
  - HR 1
  - HR 2
  - HR 3

=== Cyprus ===
- CYBC
- BRTK

=== Czechia ===
- ČT
- ČRo

=== Faroe Islands ===
- Kringvarp Føroya
  - Sjónvarp Føroya
  - Útvarp Føroya

=== Hungary ===
- MTVA
  - Magyar Rádió és Televízió
    - Magyar Rádió
    - Magyar Televízió
    - Duna Televízió
  - Magyar Távirati Iroda
- KESMA
- TVS (Televízió Segting)
- TV2
- TV1 Hírek
- Magyar Hirlap
- Demokrata
- Index
- Media 1
- Friends of Hungary Foundation
- About Hungary

=== Italy ===
- RAI
  - Rai 1
  - Rai 2
  - Rai 3
  - Rai 4
  - Rai 5
  - Rai 4K
  - Rai Movie
  - Rai Premium
  - Rai Gulp
  - Rai Yoyo
  - Rai News 24
  - Rai Storia
  - Rai Sport
  - Italiana
  - Rai Radio 2 Visual
  - Rai Italia
  - Rai World Premium
  - Rai Südtirol
  - Rai 3 BIS FJK

=== Isle of Man ===
- Manx Radio
- BBC Isle of Man

=== Kosovo ===
- RTK

=== Malta ===
- PBS
  - TVM
  - TVM+
  - TVMSport+

=== Moldova ===
- Teleradio-Moldova
- Moldpres

=== Netherlands ===
- Regionale Publieke Omroep
  - L1 (Limburg)
  - NH (North Holland)
  - Omroep Brabant (North Brabant)
  - Omroep Flevoland (Flevoland)
  - Omroep Gelderland (Gelderland)
  - Omroep West (Northern South Holland)
  - Omroep Zeeland (Zeeland)
  - Omrop Fryslân (Friesland)
  - RTV Drenthe (Drenthe)
  - RTV Noord (Groningen)
  - RTV Oost (Overijssel)
  - RTV Rijnmond (Southern South Holland)
  - RTV Utrecht (Utrecht)

=== North Macedonia ===
- MRT

=== Poland ===
- TVP
- Polskie Radio

=== Portugal ===
- Rádio e Televisão de Portugal
- ARtv - parliamentary broadcaster

=== Romania ===
- Agerpres
- Radio România
- TVR
  - TVR1
  - TVR2
  - TVR3
  - TVR Info
  - TVR Cultural
  - TVR Folclor
  - TVR Sport
  - TVR Moldova
  - TVR International

=== Russia ===
- OTR (Общественное Телевидение России, Obshchestvennoe Televidenie Rossii)
- RT
- Gazprom Media
- Channel One Russia
- All-Russia State Television and Radio Broadcasting Company (VGTRK)
- Russian Television and Radio Broadcasting Network
- Mir

=== San Marino ===
- San Marino RTV

=== Serbia ===
- RTS
- RTV

=== Slovakia ===
- Slovenská Televízia a Rozhlas
  - 1 Jednotka
  - 2 Dvojka
  - Šport
  - 24

=== Spain ===
- RTVE
  - La 1
  - La 2
  - La 2 Cat
  - 24 Horas
  - Clan
  - Teledeporte
  - TVE UHD
  - TVE Internacional
  - Star
- Regional broadcasters
  - Euskal Irrati Telebista - Basque Country
  - Corporació Catalana de Mitjans Audiovisuals – Catalonia
  - Corporación Radio e Televisión de Galicia – Galicia
  - Radio y Televisión de Andalucía – Andalusia
  - Radio Televisión Madrid – Madrid
  - Corporació Valenciana de Mitjans de Comunicació - Valencian Community
  - Radio Televisión Canaria – Canary Islands
  - Castilla-La Mancha Media - Castilla–La Mancha
  - Ens Públic de Radiotelevisió de les Illes Balears - Balearic Island
  - Corporación Aragonesa de Radio y Televisión – Aragon
  - Radiotelevisión del Principado de Asturias - Asturias
  - Radiotelevisión de la Región de Murcia - Murcia
  - Corporación Extremeña de Medios Audiovisuales - Extremadura

=== Turkey ===
- Turkish Radio and Television Corporation (TRT)
  - TRT 1
  - TRT 2
  - TRT 3
  - TRT Haber
  - TRT World
  - TRT Spor
  - TRT Spor Yıldız
  - TRT Kurdî
  - TRT Avaz
  - TRT Çocuk
  - TBMM TV
  - TRT Türk
  - TRT Müzik
  - TRT Belgesel
  - TRT Genç
  - TRT Arabi
  - TRT 4K
  - Radyo 1
  - TRT FM
  - Radyo 3
  - Radyo 4
  - Radyo 6
  - Voice of Turkey
  - TRT Nağme
  - TRT Avrupa FM
  - TRT Türkü

=== Vatican City ===
- Vatican Media
- Vatican Radio

== Oceania ==
=== Samoa ===
- Broadcasting Services Division
  - TV9
  - Radio National 2AP

== See also ==
- List of government gazettes
- List of international broadcasters
- Media capture
- Media transparency
- Political warfare
- Propaganda
- Soft power
