= DD Coimbatore =

- Country: India
- Headquarters: Coimbatore, Tamil Nadu

Ownership
- Owner: Doordarshan
- Sister channels: DD India; DD News; DD Sports; DD Bharati

History
- Launched: 14 April 1975

Links
- Website: www.ddindia.gov.in

Availability

Terrestrial
- Analogue: VHF band

Doordarshan Coimbatore is a Tamil language television channel. It was inaugurated on 14 April 1975 and the studio is in Coimbatore. The service has been extended to the entire state in phased manner by installing terrestrial transmitters of different capacities (HPTs, LPTs, VLPTs) at different parts of the state.

DD Coimbatore is in western Tamil Nadu and also used for narrowcasting the Tamil Nadu Agricultural University in collaboration with Doordarshan Kendra, Coimbatore has recently Started the "Narrow casting of agricultural programmes through LPT" for the benefit of farmers and general public in and around Coimbatore district.

The local service caters to the needs of the populace living in the areas falling within the reach of a particular transmitter through area specific programmes in the local languages and dialects.
