= DD Arunprabha =

Indian satellite television channel

- Country: India
- Broadcast area: India
- Headquarters: Itanagar, Arunachal Pradesh, India.

Programming
- Language: Hindi
- Picture format: 4:3 576i (SDTV)

Ownership
- Owner: Doordarshan
- Sister channels: DD National; DD News; DD Bharati; DD Kisan; DD Sports; DD India

History
- Launched: 9 February 2019

Links
- Website: doordarshan.gov.in/ddarunprabha

Doordarshan Arunprabha (DD Arun Prabha) is an Indian satellite television channel, which was launched on 9 February 2019 by Prime Minister of India Narendra Modi. It is Doordarshan's second channel for North East and first for Arunachal Pradesh.

Doordarshan Arunprabha TV channel is available on DD Free dish DTH at channel no. 11. DD Itanagar was replaced by DD Arun Prabha.

== See also ==
- DD Assam
