= Doordarshan =

India's public service broadcaster

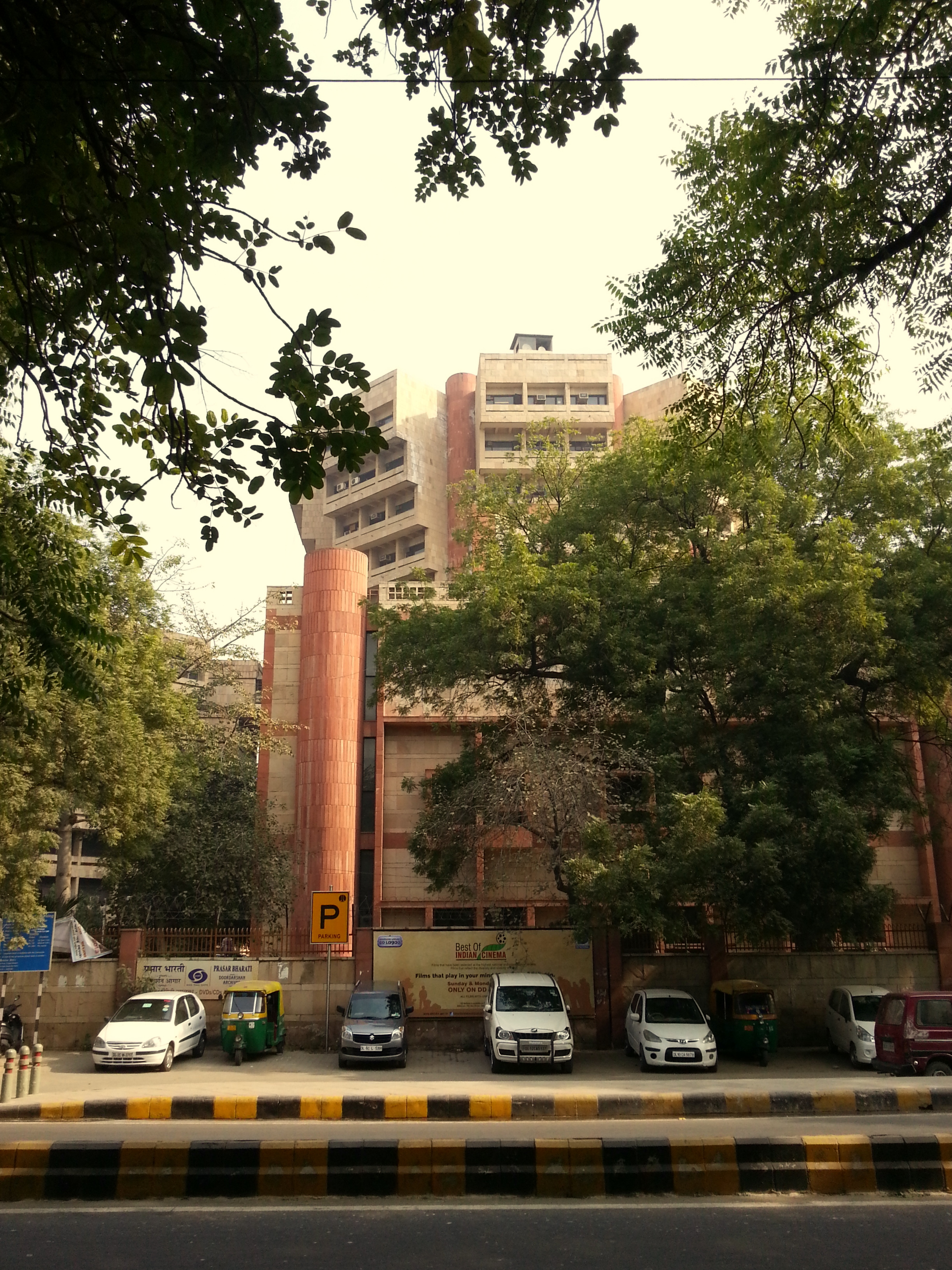
- Doordarshan Bhawan at Mandi House, New Delhi
- Type: Public broadcasting; Broadcast; Satellite television; Internet; OTT
- Branding: DD
- Country: India
- Availability: India
- Motto: सत्यम् शिवम् सुंदरम् (“Ultimate reality for one is truth, is Śiva (the auspicious absolute), and is beauty.”)
- Headquarters: New Delhi, Delhi
- Broadcast area: Indian subcontinent
- Owner: Ministry of Information and Broadcasting, Government of India
- Parent: Prasar Bharati
- Key people: Gaurav Dwivedi (CEO)
- Launch date: 1959
- Picture format: 1080p (HDTV) (downscaled to 16:9 576i for the SDTV feed)
- Callsign meaning: DoorDarshan
- Official website: prasarbharati.gov.in/doordarshan/
- Language: Hindi, English, Urdu, Tamil, Telugu, Kannada, Malayalam, Marathi, Bengali, Gujarati, Meitei, Assamese, Odia, Punjabi

Doordarshan (lit. 'far sight', i.e. television), abbreviated as DD, is India's state-owned public television broadcaster. Established by the Government of India on 15 September 1959, it is owned by the Ministry of Information and Broadcasting and constitutes one of Prasar Bharati's two divisions. Doordarshan, one of India's largest broadcasting organisations in studio and transmitter infrastructure, delivers television, radio, online, and mobile services across metropolitan and regional India, and internationally. It also broadcasts via digital terrestrial transmitters.

== History ==
=== Beginnings ===
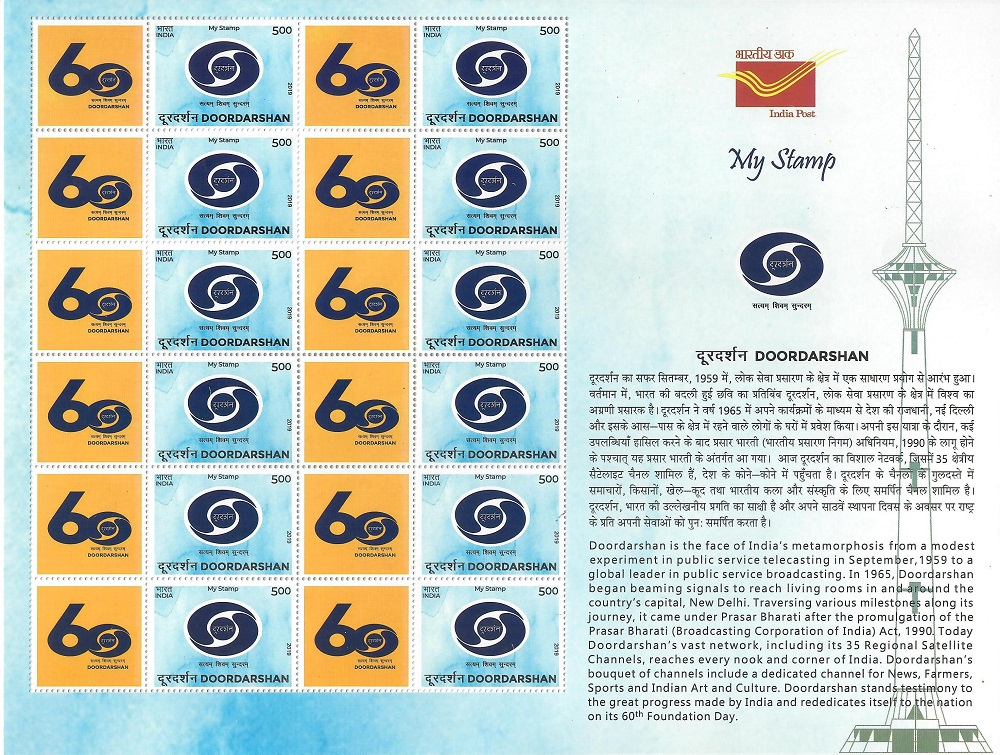
A sheet of postage stamps released in 2019 on the occasion of Doordarshan's 60th Foundation Day

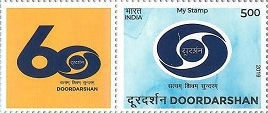
A stamp honouring Doordarshan's 60th Foundation Day

The channel began modestly as an experimental broadcaster in Delhi on 15 September 1959, with a small transmitter and a makeshift studio. Regular daily transmission commenced in 1965 as part of All India Radio, with a five-minute news bulletin read by Pratima Puri. Salma Sultan joined Doordarshan in 1967 and became a news anchor. Gitanjali Aiyar, Neethi Ravindran, and Rini Simon became popular news anchors in the 1970s.

Krishi Darshan, which debuted on Doordarshan on 26 January 1967, is considered Indian television's longest-running programme.

Television services were expanded to Bombay (now Mumbai) and Amritsar in 1972. By 1975, only seven Indian cities had access to television, with Doordarshan being the sole provider in the country.

On 1 April 1976, television services were officially separated from radio. All India Radio and Doordarshan were placed under the management of separate Directors-General in New Delhi. In 1982, Doordarshan transitioned into a national broadcaster.

=== Nationwide transmission ===
National 1 telecasts (DD National) were introduced in 1982. Colour television in India was introduced with the live telecast of Prime Minister Indira Gandhi's Independence Day speech on 15 August 1982, followed by the colour broadcast of the 1982 Asian Games held in Delhi. Two years later, Doordarshan evolved into a structured TV network. The sole TV channel was split into DD-1, a nationally broadcast channel, and DD-2, a city-focused channel. In 1993, they were rebranded as DD National and DD Metro to compete with the then-newly privatised television industry.

According to Mitra, with the start of nationwide transmission in the 1980s Doordarshan began to push a homogenous hegemonic national image of India as a North Indian Hindu Hindi-speaking nation via the broadcast of shows such as Mahabharat (1988 TV series) and Ramayan (1987 TV series). Mitra states Doordarshan's choice of programming depicted other religions, regions, and languages as "marginal or sometimes deviant".

The live telecasts of the opening and closing ceremonies of the 2012 Summer Olympics were aired on Doordarshan's national channel, while DD Sports offered round-the-clock coverage of the event.

On 17 November 2014, Doordarshan director-general Vijayalaxmi Chhabra introduced a pink-and-purple colour scheme with a new slogan: Desh Ka Apna Channel ("The country's own channel"). In 2017, Doordarshan operated a network of nearly 1,400 terrestrial transmitters and had 46 studios producing television programmes. After introducing private channels, Doordarshan has faced challenges in maintaining its position in the television industry. Currently, Doordarshan focuses on improving its studios and programmes, primarily aimed to serve the nation.

DD National and DD News—along with 17 regional satellite channels, 11 state networks, an international channel (DD India), a sports channel (DD Sports), cultural and informative channels like DD Bharati and DD Urdu, and an agricultural channel, DD Kisan. On DD National (formerly DD-1), regional and local programs are aired on a time-sharing basis for terrestrial broadcasting only. DD News, launched on 3 November 2003, replaced DD Metro (formerly DD-2), providing 24-hour news coverage. These channels are relayed through all terrestrial transmitters in India. The regional-language satellite channels consist of two components: a regional service for a specific state (relayed by all terrestrial transmitters in that state) and additional regional-language programs available through cable and DTH operators. DD Sports broadcasts national and international sporting events and is the only channel to air rural sports such as kho-kho and kabaddi.

A new regional channel, DD Arunprabha, focusing on the North East, began broadcasting on 9 February 2019. On 9 March 2019, Prasar Bharati expanded Indian's satellite footprint through DD Free Dish by adding 11 more state DD channels. This included five channels for the North Eastern states: DD Bangla, DD Chhattisgarh, DD Goa, DD Haryana, DD Himachal Pradesh, DD Jharkhand, DD Manipur, DD Meghalaya, DD Mizoram, DD Nagaland, DD Tripura, and DD Uttarakhand. DD Bangla, launched on 9 August 1975, features a programming mix that includes soap operas, infotainment series, news and current affairs, social programs, and films, all in Bangla.

On 13 April 2020, Prasar Bharati launched DD Retro, a channel dedicated to airing classic Hindi serials from Doordarshan. However, the service ceased operations on 1 April 2023 due to low viewership.

== Channel list ==
Doordarshan operates 44 channels, including HD feeds.

=== National channels (7) ===
Channel	Launched	Language	Category	SD/HD	Notes
DD National	1959	Hindi	General Entertainment	SD+HD	Formerly DD1
DD India	1992	English	International news	SD+HD	Formerly DD International
DD Sports	1998	Hindi and English	Sports	SD+HD	
DD Bharati	2002	Hindi and English	Art and Cultural Infotainment	SD	Replaced DD3
DD News	2003	Hindi	News and Current Affairs	SD+HD	Replaced DD Metro (formerly DD2 and DD2 Metro)
DD Urdu	2006	Urdu	Infotainment	SD	
DD Kisan	2015	Hindi	Agricultural Infotainment	SD+HD	
DD Gyan Darshan		Hindi	Educational	SD+HD	

=== Regional channels (28) ===
Channel	Language	Region	SD/HD	Former Names
DD Arunprabha	Hindi	Arunachal Pradesh	SD	DD13
DD Assam	Assamese and Bengali	Assam	SD	DD13
DD Bangla	Bengali, Santali, Urdu and Nepali	West Bengal	SD+HD	DD7
DD Bihar	Hindi	Bihar	SD	
DD Chandana	Kannada	Karnataka	SD+HD	DD9
DD Chhattisgarh	Hindi	Chhattisgarh	SD	
DD Girnar	Gujarati	Gujarat	SD+HD	Doordarshan Kendra Ahmedabad
DD Haryana	Hindi	Haryana	SD	Doordarshan Kendra Hisar
DD Himachal Pradesh	Hindi	Himachal Pradesh	SD	Doordarshan Kendra Shimla
DD Jharkhand	Hindi, Nagpuri, and Santali	Jharkhand	SD	
DD Kashir	Kashmiri, Urdu, Dogri, Ladakhi and Gojri	Jammu and Kashmir	SD	Doordarshan Kendra Srinagar, Jammu and Leh
DD Madhya Pradesh	Hindi	Madhya Pradesh	SD	DD11
DD Malayalam	Malayalam	Kerala	SD	DD4
DD Manipur	Meitei (aka Manipuri)	Manipur	SD	DD13
DD Meghalaya	Khasi and English	Meghalaya	SD	DD13
DD Mizoram	Mizo	Mizoram	SD	Doordarshan Kendra Aizawl
DD Nagaland	English	Nagaland	SD	DD13
DD Odia	Odia and Santali	Odisha	SD+HD	DD6
DD Panaji	Konkani and Marathi	Goa	SD	
DD Punjabi	Punjabi	Punjab	SD	Doordarshan Kendra Jalandhar
DD Rajasthan	Hindi	Rajasthan	SD	Doordarshan Kendra Rajasthan
DD Sahyadri	Marathi	Maharashtra	SD+HD	DD10
DD Saptagiri	Telugu	Andhra Pradesh	SD	DD8
DD Tamil	Tamil	Tamil Nadu	SD+HD	DD5, DD Podhigai
DD Tripura	Bengali and Kokborok	Tripura	SD	Doordarshan Kendra Agartala
DD Uttarakhand	Hindi, Garhwali and Kumaoni	Uttarakhand	SD	Doordarshan Kendra Uttarakhand
DD Uttar Pradesh	Hindi	Uttar Pradesh	SD	DD16
DD Yadagiri	Telugu and Urdu	Telangana	SD+HD	Doordarshan Kendra Hyderabad

=== Former channels ===
Channel	Language	From	Until
DD Metro	Hindi	1984	2003
DD Retro	Hindi	2020	2023

== International broadcasting ==
The DD India satellite channel has been broadcast in 146 countries. In the United Kingdom, it was available through the Eurobird satellite on the Sky system's channel 833, under the logo Rayat TV. However, transmission via Sky Digital ended in June 2008, followed by the termination of its broadcast via DirecTV in the United States the following month.

== Record viewership during the pandemic COVID-19 ==
The Ramayan on DD National set a world record by becoming the highest-viewed entertainment programme globally. The 9:00 p.m. broadcast on 16 April 2020 was watched by 77 million viewers. The show reached over 285 million viewers during its broadcast. In response to the nationwide lockdown, DD network aired several nostalgic shows, including Mahabharat, Chanakya, Shri Krishna, Malgudi Days, Byomkesh Bakshi, and Shaktimaan. Due to increasing public demand for such content, Prasar Bharati launched DD Retro, a full-time channel dedicated to classic programming. Within five weeks of its launch, DD Retro garnered viewership of nearly 50 million. Additionally, the DD network played a key role in public messaging during the pandemic, reaching over 400 million viewers through COVID-19 awareness messages and shows during the first wave of 2020.

== Criticisms ==
Prasar Bharati is the parent body of Doordarshan, and the Government of India appoints its board members through the Ministry of Information and Broadcasting.

Doordarshan has been used, particularly during the Emergency, to disseminate government propaganda. During Operation Blue Star in 1984, only government sources were relied upon for reporting the events. Additionally, Doordarshan was involved in the production of a video that claimed acts of violence, which, when investigated by independent journalists, were found to be false.

In 2004, it censored a controversial documentary on Jayaprakash Narayan, an opposition leader during the Emergency.

In 2014, Doordarshan broadcast a 70-minute Vijayadashami speech by Rashtriya Swayamsevak Sangh (RSS) leader Mohan Bhagwat, which led to criticism of the Narendra Modi administration and the BJP for "misusing" the public broadcaster. DD Director-General Archana Datta responded, "The speech was like any other news event; therefore, we covered it."

Since private television channels were authorised in 1991, Doordarshan has experienced a steep decline in viewership. Although Doordarshan earns significant advertising revenue, due to its compulsory feed from the highest bidder for national events, including cricket matches, there has been a proposal to fund the network by imposing a licence fee for owning a television in India.

== Legacy ==
A film named after the broadcaster, spiritually motivated by the 2003 German film Good Bye, Lenin!, was released in February 2020.

== See also ==
- All India Radio – National public radio broadcaster of India
- DD Free Dish – Indian free-to-air satellite television service
- DD India – Indian state-owned international television news channel
- DD National – Indian entertainment television channel
- DD Retro – Indian television channel
- List of programs broadcast by DD National
- Ministry of Information and Broadcasting – Government ministry of India
- Sansad TV – Indian television channel
