= DD Free Dish =

Indian free-to-air satellite television service

- Industry: Satellite television
- Founded: 16 December 2004; 21 years ago
- Headquarters: New Delhi, India
- Services: Satellite; Streaming television
- Owner: Prasar Bharati
- Website: prasarbharati.gov.in/free-dish

DD Free Dish (formerly known as DD Direct Plus) is an Indian state-owned free-to-air satellite television provider owned and operated by Public Service Broadcaster Prasar Bharati. It was launched in December, 2004. In March 2022, It has a reach of over 43 million households which is more than 25% of the total TV households in the country. DD Free Dish earns by selling slots to private broadcasters through e-auction.

Currently, DD Free Dish has 184 television channel slots, among which 94 are in MPEG-2 format and 69 are in MPEG-4 format. For classes 1 to 12, educational TV channels are run under PM e-Vidya program.

== Television channels ==
=== Doordarshan ===
TV channels owned by Prasar Bharati:

==== National ====
- DD Bharati – State-owned art and cultural infotainment channel
- DD India – State-owned international channel
- DD Kisan – Agriculture education and information channel
- DD National – General entertainment channel
- DD News – News channel
- DD Sports – Sports channel
- DD Urdu – State-owned Urdu-language infotainment channel

==== Parliamentary ====
- Sansad TV 1 – For proceedings of Lok Sabha
- Sansad TV 2 – For proceedings of Rajya Sabha

==== High definition (HD) channels ====
DD Free Dish has eleven HD channels in MPEG-4 format –

- DD National HD – HD version of DD National
- DD India HD — HD version of DD India
- DD News HD — HD version of DD News
- DD Sports HD — HD version of DD Sports
- Sansad TV 1 HD — HD version of DD Sansad TV 1
- Sansad TV 2 HD — HD version of DD Sansad TV 2
- DD Kisan HD — HD version of DD Kisan
- DD Tamil HD — HD version of DD Tamil
- DD Sahyadri HD — HD version of DD Sahyadri
- DD Girnar HD — HD version of DD Girnar
- DD Odia HD — HD version of DD Odia

==== Regional channels (MPEG-2) ====
Name	Language	Region
DD Assam	Assamese	Assam
DD Bangla	Bengali	West Bengal
DD Tripura	Bengali and Kokborok	Tripura
DD Bihar	Hindi	Bihar
DD Chhattisgarh	Hindi	Chhattisgarh
DD Himachal Pradesh	Hindi	Himachal Pradesh
DD Jharkhand	Hindi	Jharkhand
DD Madhya Pradesh	Hindi	Madhya Pradesh
DD Uttar Pradesh	Hindi	Uttar Pradesh
DD Arun Prabha	Hindi and English	Arunachal Pradesh
DD Rajasthan	Hindi and Rajasthani	Rajasthan
DD Uttarakhand	Garhwali, Kumaoni and Hindi	Uttarakhand
DD Kashir	Kashmiri and Urdu	Jammu and Kashmir
DD Chandana	Kannada	Karnataka
DD Girnar	Gujarati	Gujarat
DD Malayalam	Malayalam	Kerala
DD Odia	Odia	Odisha
DD Punjabi	Punjabi	Punjab
DD Tamil	Tamil	Tamil Nadu
DD Saptagiri	Telugu	Andhra Pradesh
DD Yadagiri	Telugu	Telangana

==== Regional channels (MPEG-4) ====
Name	Language	Region
DD Goa	Hindi and Konkani	Goa
DD Haryana	Hindi and Haryanvi	Haryana
DD Manipur	Manipuri	Manipur
DD Meghalaya	Khasi and Garo	Meghalaya
DD Mizoram	Mizo	Mizoram
DD Nagaland	English	Nagaland

=== Private channels (MPEG-2) ===
==== Hindi ====
Category	Channel
General entertainment	Colors Rishtey
General entertainment	Dangal
General entertainment	Dangal 2
General entertainment	Manoranjan Grand
General entertainment	Manoranjan TV
General entertainment	The Q
General entertainment	Shemaroo TV
General entertainment	Sony Pal
General entertainment	Star Utsav
General entertainment	Sun Neo
General entertainment	Zee Anmol
Kids	Unique TV
Music	B4U Music
Music	Epic Music
Movies	All Time Movies
Movies	B4U Kadak
Movies	B4U Movies
Movies	Colors Cineplex Bollywood
Movies	Colors Cineplex Superhits
Movies	Goldmines
Movies	Goldmines Bollywood
Movies	Goldmines Movies
Movies	Shemaroo Josh
Movies	Sony Wah
Movies	Star Utsav Movies
Movies	Zee Action
Movies	Zee Anmol Cinema
Movies	Zee Anmol Cinema 2
News	Aaj Tak
News	ABP News
News	Good News Today
News	India News
News	India TV
News	NDTV India
News	News18 India
News	News 24
News	News Nation
News	Republic Bharat
News	Times Now Navbharat
News	TV9 Bharatvarsh
News	Zee News
Devotional	Aastha
Devotional	Sadhna TV
Devotional	Sanskar

==== Regional channels ====
Language	Channel	Category
Bhojpuri	B4U Bhojpuri	Movies
Bhojpuri	Bhojpuri Cinema	Movies
Bhojpuri	Epic Bhojpuri	Movies
Bhojpuri	Zee Biskope	Movies
Marathi	Fakt Marathi	GEC
Marathi	Sun Marathi	GEC
Marathi	TV9 Marathi	News
Punjabi	Manoranjan Movies	Movies
Punjabi	GTC Punjabi	Movies
Punjabi	PTC Punjabi	Movies
Punjabi	PTC News	News

==== International ====
Language	Channel	Category
English	Russia Today	News

=== Private channels (MPEG-4) ===
Language	Channel	Category
National
Hindi	Aastha Bhajan	Devotional
Hindi	Satsang	Devotional
Hindi	Vedic	Devotional
Hindi	MH One	Movies
Hindi	MH One Dil Se	Movies
Hindi	Bansal News	News
Hindi	Bharat Express	News
Hindi	Bharat24	News
Hindi	India Daily Live	News
Hindi	Live Times	News
Hindi	Living India News	News
Hindi	MH One News	News
Hindi	Nation 27	News
Hindi	News India 24x7	News
Hindi	Sudarshan News	News
Hindi	TNP News	News
English	Republic TV	News
International
English	KBS World	Korean
Regional
Assamese	NE News	News
Assamese	Prag News	News
Assamese	Rengoni	GEC
Bengali	Republic Bangla	News
Bengali	TV9 Bangla	News
Bengali	News Live Bangla	News
Bhojpuri	Captain (earlier Raapchik)	Movies
Bhojpuri	Epic Bhojpuri	Movies
Bhojpuri	Oscar Movies	Movies
Bhojpuri	Pasand	Entertainment
Gujarati	Aastha Gujarati	Devotional
Gujarati	Gujarat First	News
Gujarati	Sandesh News	News
Gujarati	TV9 Gujarati	News
Gujarati	VTV News	News
Gujarati	Zee 24 Kalak	News
Hindi (MP, CG)	Vistaar News	News
Kannada	Aastha Kannada	Devotional
Kannada	Public TV	News
Kannada	Republic Kannada	News
Kannada	TV9 Kannada	News
Marathi	Jai Maharashtra	News
Odia	Argus News	News
Punjabi	Chardikla Time TV	News and entertainment
Telugu	Aastha Telugu	Devotional
Telugu	TV9 Telugu	News

== Radio stations ==
=== National ===
- Vividh Bharati – Hindi music radio channel
- AIR Live News – Hindi and English news radio
- AIR Raagam – Indian classical music radio channel
- Akashvani Aradhana – Hindi devotional radio channel

=== Regional ===
- AIR Andhra – Telugu
- AIR Arunachal – Hindi and Nyishi
- AIR Assam – Assamese
- AIR Bihar – Hindi and Bhojpuri
- AIR Chhattisgarh – Hindi and Chhattisgarhi
- AIR Goa – Konkani
- AIR Gujarat – Gujarati
- AIR Haryana – Hindi and Haryanvi
- AIR Himachal – Hindi
- AIR Hindi
- AIR Jammu – Dogri
- AIR Jharkhand – Hindi
- AIR Karnataka – Kannada
- AIR Kerala – Malayalam
- AIR Ladakh – Ladakhi and French
- AIR Maharashtra – Marathi
- AIR Manipur – Manipuri
- AIR Meghalaya – Khasi, Garo and English
- AIR Mizoram – Mizo
- AIR MP – Hindi
- AIR Nagaland – Nagamese and English
- AIR North East – Hindi and English
- AIR Odisha – Odia
- AIR Port Blair – Hindi
- AIR Puducherry – Tamil
- AIR Punjab – Punjabi
- AIR Rajasthan – Hindi and Rajasthani
- AIR Sikkim – Nepali
- AIR Srinagar – Kashmiri and Urdu
- AIR Tamilnadu – Tamil
- AIR Telangana – Telugu
- AIR Tripura – Bengali and Kokborok
- AIR UP – Hindi
- AIR Uttarakhand – Hindi
- AIR Varanasi – Hindi
- AIR West Bengal – Bengali

=== MPEG-4 radio ===
- FM Gold Delhi
- FM Rainbow Delhi
- AIR Darbhanga
- AIR Nazibabad
- AIR World Service 1
- AIR World Service 2
- AIR N'hood Service 1
- AIR N'hood Service 2
- Aaj Tak Radio

== Educational channels ==
=== e-Vidya Channels ===
There are 12 educational channels, one for each class from Class 1 to Class 12.

- e-Vidya 1 – For Class 1 students
- e-Vidya 2 – For Class 2 students
- e-Vidya 3 – For Class 3 students
- e-Vidya 4 – For Class 4 students
- e-Vidya 5 – For Class 5 students
- e-Vidya 6 – For Class 6 students
- e-Vidya 7 – For Class 7 students
- e-Vidya 8 – For Class 8 students
- e-Vidya 9 – For Class 9 students
- e-Vidya 10 – For Class 10 students
- e-Vidya 11 – For Class 11 students
- e-Vidya 12 – For Class 12 students

=== Swayam Prabha DTH ===
- SP-01 CEC-UGC : Vageesh - language and literature
- SP-02 CEC-UGC : Sanskriti - history, culture and philosophy
- SP-03 CEC-UGC : Prabodh - social and behaviour sciences
- SP-04 CEC-UGC : Saaraswat - education and home sciences
- SP-05 CEC-UGC : Prabandhan - information, communication and management studies
- SP-06 CEC-UGC : Vidhik - law and legal studies
- SP-07 CEC-UGC : Kautilya - economics and commerce
- SP-08 CEC-UGC : Aryabhatt - physical and earth sciences
- SP-09 CEC-UGC : Spandan - life sciences
- SP-10 CEC-UGC : Daksh - applied sciences
- SP-11 NPTEL : Chemical Engineering
- SP-12 NPTEL : Civil Engineering
- SP-13 NPTEL : Computer Science Engineering
- SP-14 NPTEL : Electrical Engineering and Electronics Communication Engineering
- SP-15 NPTEL : Engineering Sciences and Biological Sciences
- SP-16 NPTEL : Humanities, Social Sciences and Management
- SP-17 NPTEL : Mechanical Engineering and Mining Engineering
- SP-18 NPTEL : Mathematics and Physics
- SP-19 IIT-PAL : Biology
- SP-20 IIT-PAL : Chemistry
- SP-21 IIT-PAL : Mathematics
- SP-22 IIT-PAL : Physics
- SP-23 IGNOU : Liberal Arts and Humanities
- SP-24 IGNOU : Agriculture and Allied Sciences
- SP-25 IGNOU : Gyan Darshan 1
- SP-26 IGNOU : State Open Universities
- SP-27 NIOS : Panini - Secondary School Education
- SP-28 NIOS : Sharda - Higher Secondary School Education
- SP-29 UGC-INFLIBNET : e-PG Pathshala - Post Graduate Courses
- SP-30 NIOS : Gyanamrit - Education in Sign Language
- SP-31 NCERT : Kishore Manch - Secondary School, Higher Secondary School and Teacher Education
- SP-32 IGNOU-NIOS : Vagda - Teacher Education
- SP-33 CEC-UGC : Vyas - Higher Education Channel
- Digi Shala - Digital Education Channel

=== VANDE Gujarat ===
- VANDE Gujarat 1
- VANDE Gujarat 2
- VANDE Gujarat 3
- VANDE Gujarat 4
- VANDE Gujarat 5
- VANDE Gujarat 6
- VANDE Gujarat 7
- VANDE Gujarat 8
- VANDE Gujarat 9
- VANDE Gujarat 10
- VANDE Gujarat 11
- VANDE Gujarat 12
- VANDE Gujarat 13
- VANDE Gujarat 14
- VANDE Gujarat 15
- VANDE Gujarat 16

=== Other channels ===
- Digi Shala
- DD Sathee 1
- DD Sathee 2
- DD Sathee 3
- DD Sathee 4
- DD Sathee 5
- DD Sathee 6
- DD Sathee 7
- DD Kite Victors (Malayalam language channel)

== See also ==
- Direct-to-home television in India
