= DD Sikkim =

Doordarshan TV channel in Gangtok, India

Doordarshan Sikkim
- Type: Terrestrial and satellite television network
- Country: India
- Availability: India and parts of Asia, China and Gulf countries.
- Headquarters: Gangtok
- Owner: Prasar Bharati
- Launch date: 2003
- Former names: Doordarshan Kendra Gangtok

DD Sikkim is a state owned television channel telecasting from Doordarshan. The station broadcasts from a 30-mile radius transmitter coming out of Gangtok and delivers local programming for about one hour and 15 minutes on weekdays. A 15-minute news bulletin from the Guwahati studios is also shown. Most of its local programming is carried in the Nepali language.

== See also ==
- List of programs broadcast by DD National
- All India Radio
- Ministry of Information and Broadcasting
- DD Direct Plus
- List of South Asian television channels by country
