= Zee Marathi =

Indian television channel

- Logo used since 2025
- Country: India
- Headquarters: Mumbai, Maharashtra, India

Programming
- Language: Marathi
- Picture format: 1080i HDTV (downscaled to letterboxed 576i for the SDTV feed)

Ownership
- Owner: Zee Entertainment Enterprises
- Sister channels: List of Zee sister channels

History
- Launched: 15 August 1999
- Former names: Alpha TV Marathi

Links
- Website: Zee Marathi Official Website

Zee Marathi also known as Z Marathi is an Indian Marathi-language general entertainment pay television channel owned by Zee Entertainment Enterprises. The channel was launched on 15 August 1999 and was known as Alpha TV Marathi until 28 March 2005, when it was renamed as Zee Marathi. It is the first Marathi GEC channel. A HD version of this channel, Zee Marathi HD, was launched on 20 November 2016.

== Reception ==
The channel also has launched some mobile apps like Tumcha Aamcha Jamala, Home Minister, Kisaan Abhiman and Talent app. The channel content could also be viewed on ZEE5 app. Due to the COVID-19 pandemic, Zee Marathi stopped their all current shows from 27 March 2020 and they reran their old shows during lockdown period. After that from 8 June 2020, they started some short & new lockdown series and from 13 July 2020, they started their original shows.

The channel also arranges some functions like Nakshatranche Dene, Swaratarang, Ganeshotsav, Diwali Dhamaka, etc. It also had launched new magazines from 2017 like Khali Doke Var Pay (Summer Vacation), Sukhakarta (Ganesh Utsav), Utsav Natyancha (Diwali Festival) and a Newspaper Zee Marathi Disha. Zee Marathi revamped with new graphics and launched 7 new shows from 23 August 2021 on the occasion of 22nd anniversary.

== Sister channels ==
=== Zee Yuva ===
Zee Yuva is a second Marathi GEC by Zee Entertainment Enterprises which is first youth centric channel. It was launched on 22 August 2016. Due to the COVID-19 pandemic, all shows of channel were stopped on 27 March 2020 and again restarted from 13 July 2020.

=== Zee Talkies ===
Zee Talkies is a Marathi pay television channel broadcasting Marathi movies by Zee Entertainment Enterprises. It is the first Marathi movie channel airing old classics and latest Marathi movies 24 hours a day. It was launched on 25 August 2007. A HD version of the channel, Zee Talkies HD, was launched on 15 October 2016.

=== Zee Chitramandir ===
Zee Chitramandir was an Indian Marathi-language FTA television channel. It broadcast Marathi movies and reran old Marathi TV series. It is available only to DD Free Dish users. It was launched on 9 April 2021 by Zee Entertainment Enterprises. It was the No.1 channel in Maharashtra and Goa amongst free platform..

=== Zee Vajwa ===
Zee Vajwa was a Marathi pay television channel broadcasting Marathi music or songs by Zee Entertainment Enterprises. It was launched on 17 October 2020 and stopped on 31 March 2022.

== Award functions ==
Year	Awards	Ref.
2000–present	Zee Chitra Gaurav Puraskar	
2004–present	Zee Marathi Utsav Natyancha Awards	
2013–present	Unch Majha Zoka Puraskar	
2015–present	Zee Natya Gaurav Puraskar	

== Plays ==
Zee Marathi entered the Marathi Theatre as a presenter in 2018 to encourage this field.
