= ATN DD Sports =

- ATN DD Sports logo
- Country: Canada
- Broadcast area: National
- Headquarters: Markham, Ontario

Programming
- Picture format: 480i (SDTV)

Ownership
- Owner: Asian Television Network

History
- Launched: October 28, 2010; 14 years ago
- Former names: ATN Neo Cricket (2010–2012); ATN Cricket (2012); ATN Sports (2012-2015)

Links
- Website: ATN DD Sports

ATN DD Sports is a Canadian discretionary English language digital cable specialty channel owned by Asian Television Network (ATN). It airs live and tape-delayed Cricket matches as well as other Asian sports such as Kabaddi, Kho-kho, Field hockey, Archery and Badminton. Programming is derived from DD Sports, India's only free-to-air national Sports channel.

== History ==
In June 2009, Asian Television Network was granted approval from the Canadian Radio-television and Telecommunications Commission (CRTC) to launch a television channel called ATN Cricket Channel Two, described as "a national, English-language ethnic Category 2 specialty programming service devoted to cricket matches from around the world and Canada as well as other sports from India."

The channel was launched on October 28, 2010 as ATN NEO Sports under a licensing agreement from the parent company of the Indian channel NEO Cricket. It sourced much of its programming from the India-based channel. ATN NEO Cricket was renamed ATN Cricket in March 2012. Shortly thereafter, in June 2012, the channel was renamed again, this time as ATN Sports. The Indian channel renamed NEO Prime on June 3, 2012.

In May 2013, ATN announced a partnership with Doordarshan, India's public broadcaster. Along with the launch of several Doordarshan channels, ATN also acquired the rights to content from DD Sports for ATN Sports. As of 2015, the channel goes by the name ATN DD Sports.

=== Logos ===
October 2010 - March 2012

March 2012 - May 2012

June 2012 – 2015

== See also ==
- ATN Cricket Plus
