= DD Goa =

Indian public television channel

Doordarshan Goa
- Country: India
- Broadcast area: Goa (terrestrial); Nationwide (satellite and cable)
- Network: Doordarshan
- Headquarters: Panaji, Goa, India

Programming
- Languages: Konkani; Marathi; English
- Picture format: 1080i HDTV (downscaled to letterboxed 576i for the SDTV feed)

Ownership
- Owner: Prasar Bharati

History
- Launched: 19 November 1982; 43 years ago (relay station); 23 June 1990; 36 years ago (local programming)
- Former names: DD Panaji (1982–2019)

Links
- Website: doordarshangoa.gov.in

Doordarshan Kendra Panaji is a free-to-air television station owned by Doordarshan, based in Panaji, capital of the state of Goa. It started broadcasting in 19 November 1982 but did not commence local production until 23 June 1990.

== History ==
Doordarshan started broadcasting to Panaji on 19 November 1982, initially relaying the national service. Its installation coincided with the 1982 Asian Games, which were held in the national capital. Initially, it operated on a single 1kW transmitter, which was upgraded to 10kW in 1986.

On 23 June 1990, DD Panaji was elevated to PGF status, which meant that the station was now able to produce local programmes in the Konkani language, for half an hour on weeknights; over time, in 1994, this increased to 60 minutes, and in 1996, to 75 minutes. Programmes in Marathi were introduced in October 1996. A new studio was due to be commissioned by October 2008. From there, it was expected to start broadcasting a Konkani bulletin on 19 December 2008. There were calls at the time to make DD Panaji a full network station.

DD Panaji planned to introduce a Konkani bulletin in the second half of 2011, with a tentative launch date set for 19 November, coinciding with the 50th anniversary of Goa's liberation. However, the deadline was failed and a new launch date was set for Republic Day, 26 January 2012. For this end, DD Panaji would air the bulletin between 7pm and 7:15pm. With its premiere, the Marathi bulletin would move to DD Sahyadri. The bulletin would eventually premiere on 10 March. The Kendra's facilities in Altinho had recently been upgraded.

DD Panaji's facilities were used to produce the live broadcast of the 2014 Lusofonia Games, which were held in the state and telecast on DD Sports.

Local airtime was increased to three hours in October 2014. On 9 March 2019, it launched national broadcasting on the DD Free Dish platform.
