= DD Retro =

Indian television channel

- Type: Television Channel
- Country: India
- Broadcast area: SARRC Country
- Network: Doordarshan
- Affiliates: Doordarshan
- Headquarters: New Delhi, India

Programming
- Language: Hindi
- Picture format: (576i, SDTV) 4:3

Ownership
- Owner: Prasar Bharati, Ministry of Information and Broadcasting
- Sister channels: DD National; DD News; DD India; DD Sports; DD Bharati; DD Kisan

History
- Launched: 13 April 2020; 6 years ago
- Closed: 31 March 2023; 3 years ago

Links
- Website: Official site

DD Retro was an Indian Hindi-language TV channel. It was launched by Prasar Bharati on 13 April 2020. It was a free-to-air general entertainment channel on which old classic shows of Doordarshan are telecasted,

DD Retro channel has been added to Doordarshan's DTT service which is available in 19 cities across India. It is primarily dedicated to telecast Doordarshan's old classic TV productions from the 80s and 90s, many being the country's highest rating series ever produced for television. The channel was shut down on 31 March 2023.

== Programming ==
- Upanishad Ganga
- Mahabharat
- Chanakya
- Sankat Mochan Hanuman
- Byomkesh Bakshi
- Dekh Bhai Dekh
- Buniyaad
- Sai Baba Tere Hazaron Hath
- Rajani
- Circus
- The Jungle Book
- Baaje Payal
- Shrimaan Shrimati
- Savitri Ek Kranti
- Charitraheen (TV series)
- Dil Hai Phir Bhi Hindustani
- Mashaal
- Vishnu Puran
- Doosra Keval
- Kal Hamara Hai
- Maa Shakti
- Chandrakanta
- Draupadi
- Alif Laila
- Shaktimaan
- Jap Tap Vrat
- Kosish Se Kamiyabi Tak
- Karan The Detective
