= DD Tripura =

Indian public television channel

Doordarshan Tripura
- Type: Broadcast television network
- Country: India
- Availability: India and parts of Asia, China and Gulf Countries.
- Headquarters: Agartala, Tripura, India
- Owner: Prasar Bharati
- Launch date: 1994 (as Doordarshan Kendra Tripura)
- Former names: Doordarshan Kendra Tripura
- Official website: www.ddkTripura.tv

DD Tripura is a state-owned television channel owned by Doordarshan, serving the Indian state of Tripura. It was formerly known as Doordarshan Kendra Agartala until 21 January 2021, when it was renamed to its current name. It also commenced full day broadcasts that day. DD Tripura channel also available on DD Free dish's Channel Number 83.

== Political Conflict ==
The Agartala unit of the Doordarshan refuted Tripura Chief Minister's Office claim that CM Manik Sarkar's speech was blacked out on Independence Day.

== See also ==
- List of programs broadcast by DD National
- All India Radio
- Ministry of Information and Broadcasting
- DD Direct Plus
- List of South Asian television channels by country
