= DD Punjabi =

Indian Punjabi-language public TV channel

Doordarshan Punjabi
- Type: Television network
- Country: India
- Availability: India and parts of Asia, China and Gulf Countries.
- Headquarters: Jalandhar, Punjab, India
- Owner: Prasar Bharati
- Launch date: 1998 (as Doordarshan Kendra Jalandhar)
- Former names: Doordarshan Kendra Jalandhar
- Official website: www.ddpunjabi.in

DD Punjabi is a state-owned Punjabi language TV channel, started in 1998, which is produced and telecasted from Doordarshan Kendra Jalandhar in Indian Punjab.

== History ==
DD Punjabi Channel was launched in 1998, and it became a 24-hour service within two years. Numerous Punjabi viewers residing in different parts of India watch the cultural programmes broadcast on DD Punjabi with interest across the state and by a number of Punjabi viewers residing in different parts of India. In its terrestrial mode DD Punjabi has near 100 per cent reach in the State of Punjab. These programmes enlighten the viewers in cultivating modern social modes. Doordarshan Kendra, Jalandhar is the hub of DD Punjabi productions.

== Programming ==
- Lafafi
- Parchhaven

== See also ==
- List of programs broadcast by DD National
- All India Radio
- Ministry of Information and Broadcasting
- DD Direct Plus
- List of South Asian television channels by country
