= DD Uttar Pradesh =

Doordarshan TV channel in Uttar Pradesh, India

Doordarshan Uttar Pradesh
- Type: Broadcast television network
- Country: India
- Owner: Prasar Bharati
- Launch date: 1975 (as Doordarshan Kendra Lucknow)
- Former names: Doordarshan Kendra Lucknow, DD-16 Uttar Pradesh
- Official website: Official Website
- Language: Hindi, Bhojpuri

Doordarshan Uttar Pradesh often abbreviated as DD Uttar Pradesh (Hindi: दूरदर्शन उत्तर प्रदेश) is a 24-hour regional satellite Government TV channel primarily telecasting from Doordarshan Kendra Lucknow (DDK Lucknow) and is a part of the state-owned Doordarshan TV Network. Previously, it was known as DD-16 Uttar Pradesh.

== History ==
Lucknow Doordarshan started functioning on 27 Nov. 1975 on channel 4 with an interim setup at 22, Ashok Marg, Lucknow. The colour transmission service of National Channel (only with Transmitter) started from 15-8-82. The news operation was criticised in 1983 for having two presenters, being compared to an acted nautanki. Viewers wanted it to be discontinued. While the regular colour transmission service from studio was started in 1984 with ENG gadgets.

== See also ==
- List of programs broadcast by DD National
- All India Radio
- Ministry of Information and Broadcasting
- DD Direct Plus
- List of South Asian television channels by country
