= Gaurav Dwivedi =

Indian civil servant and CEO of Prasar Bharati

Chief Executive Officer of Prasar Bharati
- Incumbent
- Assumed office November 2022
- Preceded by: Shashi Shekhar Vempati

Faculty Member at Lal Bahadur Shastri National Academy of Administration

Personal details
- Born: 4 November 1972 (age 53) India
- Education: (BSc) Delhi University (MBA) TRIUM EMBA
- Occupation: IAS officer
- Known for: Public broadcasting and digital governance
- Website: www.prasarbharati.gov.in

Gaurav Dwivedi (born on 4 November 1972) is a 1995-batch Indian Administrative Service officer of the Chhattisgarh cadre. He is the Chief Executive Officer of Prasar Bharati India's public service broadcaster which operates Doordarshan and All India Radio.

== Early life and education ==
Dwivedi was born on 4 November 1972 in India. He completed his Bsc degree in zoology from Hindu College of Delhi University and his MBA degree from the TRIUM EMBA program.

== Other positions ==
He also served as a faculty member at the Lal Bahadur Shastri National Academy of Administration, Mussoorie.

== Career ==
He was also the first chief executive officer of MyGov.in the citizen engagement platform of the Government of India.
