= DD Uttarakhand =

Indian public television channel

Doordarshan Uttarakhand दूरदर्शन उत्तराखण्ड
- Type: Terrestrial television network
- Country: India
- Availability: Satellite Television, YouTube
- Headquarters: Dehradun, Uttarakhand, India
- Owner: Prasar Bharati
- Launch date: 2001 (as Doordarshan Kendra Uttarakhand)
- Former names: Doordarshan Kendra Uttarakhand

DD Uttarakhand is a state-owned TV channel telecasting from Doordarshan Kendra Uttarakhand, India. It was inaugurated by Venkaiah Naidu. The first Satellite news bulletin of DD Uttarakhand was read by Mrs. Nootan Varun. The first Terrestrial news bulletin of DD Uttarakhand was read by Ms. Shikha Tyagi. Doordarshan started broadcasting to Mussoorie in the mid-1970s on channel 5.

== See also ==
- List of programs broadcast by DD National
- All India Radio
- Ministry of Information and Broadcasting
- DD Direct Plus
- List of South Asian television channels by country
