= DD Bihar =

Indian public television channel

Doordarshan Bihar
- Country: India
- Broadcast area: Global
- Headquarters: Patna, Bihar, India

Programming
- Languages: Hindi, Bhojpuri
- Picture format: 576i SDTV

Ownership
- Owner: Doordarshan

History
- Launched: 13 October 1990 (as Doordarshan Kendra Bihar)

Links
- Website: Official Website

DD Bihar is an Indian state-owned free to air Television Channel channel telecasting from Doordarshan Kendra Bihar.

== History ==
Doordarshan Kendra Patna was inaugurated on 13 October 1990 with an interim set up converting a Government Quarter located at Chhajubagh, Patna. Adjacent area was demarcated for the construction of a full-fledged studio. The new studio building with all the modern equipment and accessories was finally inaugurated on 15 March 1996.

The new Studio Complex at Chhajubagh, Patna started working in March 1999. The Main Studio is having approximately 400 sq. meter areas.

Teleclasses started airing on 10 May 2021 due to an upsurge in the pandemic, as well as mitigating learning loss among secondary students.

== See also ==
- List of programs broadcast by DD National
- All India Radio
- Ministry of Information and Broadcasting
- DD Direct Plus
- List of South Asian television channels by country
