= DD Sports =

Indian state-owned sport television channel

- Type: Television Channel
- Country: India
- Broadcast area: Worldwide
- Network: Doordarshan
- Headquarters: New Delhi, Delhi, India

Programming
- Languages: English, Hindi and Sign Language
- Picture format: 1080i HDTV

Ownership
- Owner: Prasar Bharati, Ministry of Information and Broadcasting
- Sister channels: DD National; DD News; DD India; DD Bharati; DD Kisan; DD Retro

History
- Launched: 18 March 1998; 28 years ago

Links
- Website: Official Website

Availability

Terrestrial
- ASTA TV: Channel 236 (HDTV); Channel 240 (SDTV)

Streaming media
- YouTube: Official Channel

DD Sports is an Indian state-owned sports television channel, founded by the Government of India, owned by the Ministry of Information and Broadcasting. It telecasting from Central Production Centre in Delhi, India. It is a part of the Doordarshan family of networks, and is the main public sports broadcaster in India.

== History ==
DD Sports was launched on 18 March 1998. In the beginning, it broadcast sports programmes for six hours a day, which was increased to 12 hours in 1999. From 1 June 2000, DD Sports became a "round-the-clock" satellite channel. It was an encrypted pay channel between 2000 and 2003, and on 15 July 2003, it became the only free-to-air sports channel in the country.

Besides showing live sporting events like cricket, football, and tennis, DD Sports showcases Indian sports including kabaddi and kho-kho. In addition to international sporting events, important national tournaments of hockey, football, athletics, cricket, swimming, tennis, badminton, archery, and wrestling are also telecast. The DD Sports channel also telecasts news-based programmes, sports quizzes, and personality-oriented shows.

== See also ==
- ATN DD Sports
- List of programs broadcast by DD National
- All India Radio
- Ministry of Information and Broadcasting
- DD Free Dish
- List of South Asian television channels by country
