= DD Himachal Pradesh =

Indian public television channel

Doordarshan Shimla
- Type: Broadcast television network
- Country: India
- Availability: India and parts of Asia, China and Gulf Countries.
- Headquarters: Shimla, Himachal Pradesh, India,
- Owner: Prasar Bharati
- Launch date: 1994 (as Doordarshan Kendra Shimla)
- Former names: Doordarshan Kendra Himachal Pradesh
- Official website: www.ddkshimla.in

DD Himachal is a state owned TV channel telecasting from Doordarshan Kendra Shimla. It was commissioned on 7 June 1995. Since the company's fiscal 2014/15 year, the channel was broadcasting four hours a day on weekdays (3pm to 7pm) and for half an hour on Sundays (6:30pm to 7pm).

== See also ==
- List of programs broadcast by DD National
- All India Radio
- Ministry of Information and Broadcasting
- DD Direct Plus
- List of South Asian television channels by country
