= DD Bharati =

Indian state-owned art and culture television channel

- Type: Television Channel
- Country: India
- Broadcast area: Asia, UK, United States, Fiji, Guyana
- Network: Doordarshan
- Headquarters: New Delhi, Delhi, India

Programming
- Picture format: 1080i HDTV (downscaled to letterboxed 576i for the HDTV feed)

Ownership
- Owner: Prasar Bharati, Ministry of Information and Broadcasting
- Sister channels: DD National; DD News; DD India; DD Sports; DD Kisan; DD Retro

History
- Launched: 26 January 2002; 23 years ago
- Replaced: DD News (First DD News channel)
- Former names: Doordarshan Kendra Delhi

Links
- Website: doordarshan.gov.in/ddb

Availability - Available on all major Indian DTH & Cables.

Terrestrial
- DVB-T2 (India): Check local frequencies

Streaming media
- YouTube: Official Channel

DD Bharati is an Indian state-owned art and culture television channel, founded by the Government of India, owned by the Ministry of Information and Broadcasting. It is the flagship channel of Doordarshan was launched on 26 January 2002, by converting the first DD News (DD News and Current Affairs) channel, which was underperforming. However Doordarshan again relaunched DD News channel on 3 November 2003 by converting popular DD Metro. It telecasts various cultural programmes and is dedicated to show India's vast culture and traditions.

== History ==
DD-Bharati Channel was launched on 26 January 2002. Besides programmes on adventure, quiz contests, fine arts/paintings, crafts and designs, cartoons, talent hunts, etc., it also telecasts MERI BAAT an hour-long phone-in 'live' show with young people. Programmes emphasising on a healthy life style and focusing on prevention rather than cure, both in our traditional and modern forms of medicine are also being telecast. Classical dance/music performances by top class artists of national and international fame are also featured on this channel are programmes on theatre, literature, music, paintings, sculpture and architecture. The channel also telecast programmes in collaboration with organisations like IGNCA, CEC, IGNOU, PSBT, NCERT and Sahitya Akademi. The channel also provides extensive coverage to the AIR sangeet sammelans. Contributions made by the Regional Doordarshan Kendra's are regularly telecast live/recorded.

DD Bharati is working as a cultural heritage of India. It is a dedicated channel for art and culture. The technology used by this channel is standard SD. The logo of this channel has now been changed. In the prime time slot at 9 PM, special shows dedicated to classical music are telecasted, and documentaries on various subjects are also broadcast from time to time. Additionally, some programs from the DD archive are telecasted in the morning slot.

The show "Byomkesh Bakshi" by Basu Chatterji is also aired on DD Bharati.

== See also ==
- List of programs broadcast by DD National
- All India Radio
- DD Direct Plus
- List of South Asian television channels by country
- Media in Chennai
- Ministry of Information and Broadcasting
