= Radio Thailand Satun =

Coordinates: 6.653065°N 100.083431°E

Radio Thailand Satun is a Thailand government radio station which is owned by the Public Relations Department. It broadcasts in Satun Province, parts of Trang Province, Songkhla Province and Phatthalung Province. It can be received in Malaysia in places such as Perlis, Langkawi, northern Kedah and Penang. Radio Thailand Satun broadcasts on two FM frequencies and one AM frequency with 1 kW and 10 kW transmitter power output respectively. It provides information, knowledge and entertainment to the listeners.

== Frequencies ==
- FM 95.5 MHz from Tambon Khuan Khan district cover Satun province, Malaysia: Perlis, Langkawi and North Kedah (Jitra, Bukit Kayu Hitam, Kuala Kedah, Kuala Nerang, Ayer Hitam, Kubang Pasu, Alor Setar, Pendang and parts of Yan) as well as parts of Trang, Songkhla and Phatthalung.
- FM 99.5 MHz from Tambon Khuan Khan district cover Satun province, Malaysia: Perlis, Langkawi, Penang as well as parts of Trang, Songkhla and Phatthalung.
- AM 1206 kHz from Khuan Khan Muang covers Satun provinces.

== Programs ==
- FM 95.5 MHz – General service, entertainment, music, local information, news and knowledge for Satun community.
- FM 99.5 MHz – Life and social, but most programs are broadcast via Radio Thailand Bangkok FM 92.5 MHz/AM 891 kHz (National radio network) and Radio Thailand AM 918 kHz ASEAN-language radio network.
