= DD Haryana =

Indian Hindi-language public television channel

Doordarshan Haryana
- Type: Public broadcasting television network
- Branding: DD Haryana
- Country: India
- Headquarters: Hisar, Haryana, India,
- Broadcast area: Haryana
- Area: North India
- Nation: India
- Regions: Haryana
- Owner: Prasar Bharati
- Parent: Ministry of Information and Broadcasting (India)
- Launch date: November 1, 2002 (as Doordarshan Kendra Haryana)
- Former names: Hisar Doordarshan Kendra

DD Haryana, is a state-owned TV channel, and only government-owned television production center in Haryana, telecasting from the Hisar Doordarshan Kendra in sector-13 of Hisar of Haryana state in India. DD Haryana TV Channel is now available on DD FreeDish Channel Number 98.

== History ==
Hisar Doordershan Kendra and TV Studio with Satellite Earth Station and DD-2 transmitter, was officially inaugurated on 1 Nov 2002 in Hisar (city) by the Bharatiya Janata Party leader Sushma Swaraj who was then Union Minister of Information and Broadcasting, though programs were not telecast daily and it began only with the production of 75 minute long news program in Hindi language. It was upgraded to a regional channel as DD Haryana, by the new Bharatiya Janata Party government under prime minister Narendra Modi, with daily telecast from 1 Nov 2015 covering the whole of Haryana with 19 relay centers. It telecasts from 04.30 pm to 07-00 pm Monday to Friday and from 06.45 pm to 07.00 pm from Saturday & Sunday.

== List of programmes ==
DD Hisar telecasts the following Television programs:

- Ghar Aangan: for women, every Monday from 5.00 PM to 5.30 pm
- Navtarang: career counseling for youth, every Tuesday at 5.00 pm
- Kisan: for farmers, from Monday to Friday 5 days a week from 05:30 pm to 06:00 pm
- Nanhi Duniya: infotainment for children, every 3rd, 4th & 5th Thursday at 5.00 pm

== Technology ==
It is the only state-owned Television studio in Haryana, equipped with Satellite earth station and transmission tower.

== See also ==
- BIG FM 92.7
- DD Direct Plus
- Radio Mantra
- List of programs broadcast by DD National
- List of South Asian television channels by country
- Ministry of Information and Broadcasting
