= DD Mizoram =

Indian public television channel

Doordarshan Mizoram
- Type: Broadcast television network
- Country: India
- Availability: India and parts of Asia, China and Gulf countries.
- Headquarters: Aizawl, Mizoram, India
- Owner: Prasar Bharati
- Launch date: 1994 (as Doordarshan Kendra Mizoram)
- Former names: Doordarshan Kendra Tripura
- Official website: www.ddkMizoram.tv

DD Mizoram is a state owned TV channel telecasting from Doordarshan Kendra Mizoram.

== See also ==
- List of programs broadcast by DD National
- All India Radio
- Ministry of Information and Broadcasting
- DD Direct Plus
- List of South Asian television channels by country
