= DD Assam =

Doordarshan TV channel in Assam, India

- Logo used since 2020
- Country: India
- Headquarters: Guwahati, Assam India

Programming
- Languages: Assamese and English

Ownership
- Owner: Prasar Bharati
- Key people: RNU Head : Maruf Alam

History
- Launched: 1985; 41 years ago (as Doordarshan Kendra Guwahati)
- Replaced: DD North-East
- Former names: Doordarshan Kendra Guwahati, DD North-East

Links
- Website: Official Website

DD Assam is a state-owned Indian TV channel operated by Doordarshan. It telecasts from Doordarshan Kendra, Guwahati, Assam. DD Assam is available on DD Free dish DTH, at channel 52. Doordarshan Assam can reach almost 83% of the population and almost 79% the area.

== History ==
The Doordarshan Kednra Guwahati was commissioned on March 24, 1985. DD Assam 24 x 7 satellite channel was launched on 4 August 2020 by the then Minister of Information and Broadcasting Prakash Javadekar. It was done through video conferencing from New Delhi.

== Regional News Unit (RNU) ==
DD News has 31 functional Regional News Units / Bureaus which are broadcasting over 140 news bulletins in 22 languages/dialects with a consolidated more than 49 hours of daily telecast of bulletins and programmes. RNUs besides producing regional news also cater to DD News in Reporting, Visual feeds & Special Programming. All the States have a Regional News Unit (RNU), except Sikkim. Jammu and Kashmir has 2 RNUs, while there is one in Leh for Ladakh UT. Over 900 stringers are working for the DD News Network, across the country in all districts. RNU are headed by an Indian Information Service Officer (IIS) officer. He or she is responsible for functioning of the RNU including bulletins, budget / finance, coordination and other administrative issues. News Editors are posted in RNU to mount the news bulletins / programmes, assignment coordination, social media handling, and to assist Head of RNU in the financial and administrative works.

RNU also engages the services of Reporters, Stringers, Camerapersons, Copy Editors, Assistant News Editors, Video Editors, Graphics Editors, News Readers, Website Assistants on casual assignments to mount the News Bulletins / Programmes.

== Programming ==
- Batori (News)
- Xu Prabhat Axom (Good Morning Show)
- Borgeet
- Chah Gashar Maje Maje (Tea Garden Programme)
- Geetmala
- Krishi Darshan
- Rupali Dhow

== RNU Head and News Editor ==
1. Maruf Alam, IIS RNU Head and News Editor
2. Santanu Rowmuria, IIS News Editor

== See also ==
- List of programs broadcast by DD National
- All India Radio
- Ministry of Information and Broadcasting
- DD Free Dish
- List of South Asian television channels by country
