= Pasand (TV channel) =

Indian Bhojpuri Entertainment Channel

Pasand TV
- Country: India
- Headquarters: New Delhi, Delhi, India

Programming
- Language(s): Bhojpuri/Hindi

Ownership
- Owner: OSM Network
- Sister channels: Oscar Movies Bhojpuri

History
- Launched: 26 November 2021; 3 years ago

Pasand TV is a Free-to-air Hindi/Bhojpuri language entertainment channel owned by OSM Network. The channel shows Hindi and Bhojpuri shows.

== Current shows ==
- Yam Hain Hum
- Yes Boss
- Jijaji Chhat Per Hain

== Former shows ==
- Malini Iyer
- Kesariya Balam Aavo Hamare Des
- Chacha Chaudhary
- Om Namah Shivay
