= DD Rajasthan =

Indian public television channel

Doordarshan Rajasthan
- Type: Broadcast television network
- Country: India
- Availability: India and parts of Asia, China and Gulf Countries.
- Headquarters: Jaipur, Rajasthan, India
- Owner: Prasar Bharati
- Launch date: 1994 (as Doordarshan Kendra Rajasthan)
- Former names: Doordarshan Kendra Rajasthan
- Official website: www.ddkRajasthan.tv

DD Rajasthan is a state-owned TV channel telecasting from Doordarshan Kendra Rajasthan. It is to be revamped as DD Aravali soon. The proposed DD Aravali Channel will be telecasted from DDK Jaipur. It will be 24 hours channel and will be available on DTH and Cable Networks.

== History ==
On 1 August 1975, the first television broadcast was viewed by the people of Rajasthan under the Satellite Instructional Television Experiment targeting the districts of Kota, Sawai Madhopur and Jaipur.

Doordarshan Kendra in Jaipur was set up on 1 June 1987 at Jhalana Doongri and transmission started on 6 July 1987. Initially only 30 minutes of programming produced by this Kendra and this was gradually increased. Presently the Kendra originates about four hours of programming daily.

The channel covers 79% by population and 72% by area of Rajasthan.

== See also ==
- List of programs broadcast by DD National
- All India Radio
- Ministry of Information and Broadcasting
- DD Direct Plus
- List of South Asian television channels by country
