= Bharat24 =

Indian Hindi-language television news channel

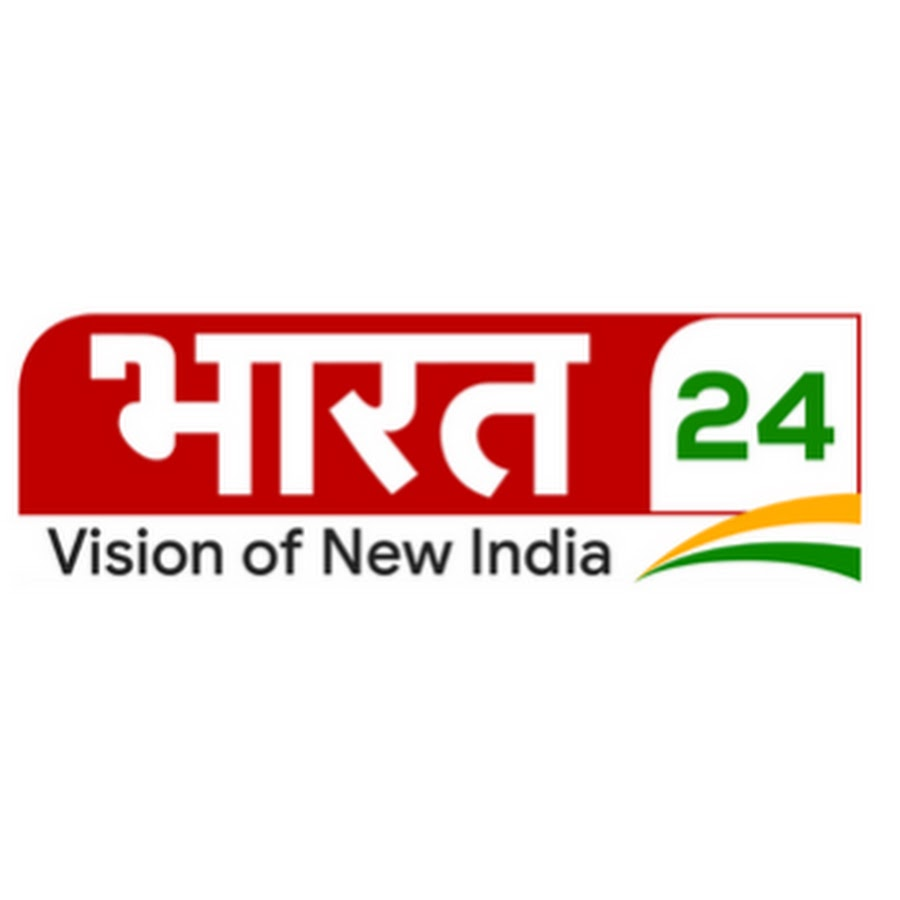
- Country: India
- Broadcast area: India
- Headquarters: Noida, India

Programming
- Language: Hindi

Ownership
- Owner: Live News India Network Private Limited

History
- Launched: 15 August 2022
- Founder: Ramesh Lamba(MD) and Jagdeesh Chandra(CEO)

Links
- Website: www.bharat24live.com

Bharat24, Vision of New India, is an Indian Hindi-language television news channel, based in Noida, India. The channel, with bureaus in all major states throughout India and a team of more than 4,000 reporters in the field, was launched on 15 August 2022 by Anurag Thakur, India's Information & Broadcasting Minister.

== History ==
Bharat24 news channel is owned by Jaipur Media and Broadcasting Pvt Ltd, a media company based in Jaipur, Rajasthan. Its broadcast centre is in Noida, India. Ramesh Lamba, the managing director of Bharat 24 Vision of New India oversaw the launch of the news channel on 15 August 2022, marking the channel's debut on India's Independence Day. The channel launched with the aim of delivering national news with a strong national presence, symbolizing a significant expansion in the Indian news broadcasting landscape.
