= DD Chhattisgarh =

Indian television channel

Doordarshan Chhattisgarh
- Type: Broadcast television network
- Country: India
- Availability: India and parts of Asia, China and Gulf Countries.
- Headquarters: Raipur, Chhattisgarh, India
- Owner: Prasar Bharati
- Launch date: 1994 (as Doordarshan Kendra Chhattisgarh)
- Former names: Doordarshan Kendra Chhattisgarh
- DD Free Dish: LCN 84
- Official website: www.ddraipur.gov.in

DD Chhattisgarh is a state owned TV channel telecasting from Doordarshan Kendra Chhattisgarh. DD Chhattisgarh (DD Raipur) Channel available on DD Free dish channel number 84.

== List of programs broadcast by DD Chhattisgarh ==
- Programme Highlights *

Hindi Film Songs Programme *GULDASTA on every Monday from 03:00 to 03:30 pm.

Agriculture based Programme KRISHI DARSHAN daily (except Saturday & Sunday) from 05:00 to 05:30 pm.

Informative Programme about Health & Hygiene HUM AUR HAMARA SWASTH daily (except Saturday & Sunday) from 06:00 to 06:30 pm.

REGIONAL NEWS (Hindi) daily from 06:30 to 06:45 pm.

BHUIYEN KE GOTH on every Tuesday from 04:00 to 04:30 pm.

SUGAM SANGEET on every Wednesday from 03:00 to 03:30 pm.

Live Phone-in Programme SWACHCHH BHARAT on every Wednesday from 04:00 to 04:30 pm.

Live Phone-in Programme HELLO DOCTOR on every Wednesday from 05:00 to 05:30 pm.

BASTAR ANCHAL SE on every Thursday from 04:30 to 05:00 pm.

Live Phone-in Programme AAP KI BAATEN on every Thursday from 05:00 to 05:30 pm.

- All India Radio
- Ministry of Information and Broadcasting
- DD Direct Plus
- List of South Asian television channels by country
