= DD Jharkhand =

Indian public TV channel

Doordarshan Jharkhand
- Type: Broadcast television network
- Country: India
- Availability: India and parts of Asia, China and Gulf Countries.
- Headquarters: Ranchi, Jharkhand, India
- Owner: Prasar Bharati
- Launch date: 1974; 52 years ago (as Doordarshan Kendra Jharkhand)
- Former names: Doordarshan Kendra Jharkhand
- Official website: www.ddkJharkhand.tv
- Language: Hindi, Santali, Nagpuri

DD Jharkhand is a state-owned TV channel telecasting from Ranchi, Jharkhand, India.

== See also ==
- List of programs broadcast by DD National
- All India Radio
- Ministry of Information and Broadcasting
- DD Direct Plus
- List of South Asian television channels by country
