= Neelum Sharma =

Indian anchor

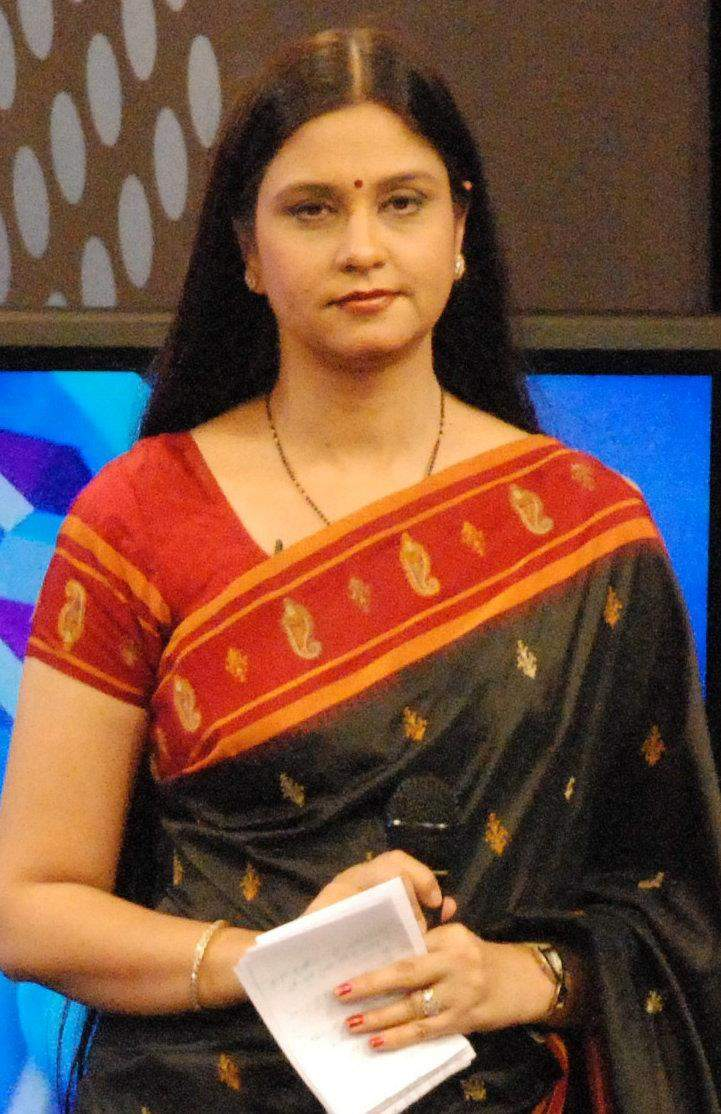
- Born: 7 March 1969
- Died: 17 August 2019 (aged 50)
- Education: Lady Shri Ram College Indian Institute of Mass Communication Jamia Millia Islamia
- Occupations: News Anchor, Journalist
- Years active: 1995 to 2019
- Spouse: Anil Kapoor (Not to be confused with the actor of the same name)
- Children: Neelabh Kapoor
- Awards: Aadhi Abadi Women Achievers Award 2010 Media Maharathi 2013 Nari Shakti Puraskar 2019

Neelum Sharma (7 March 1969 – 17 August 2019) was an Indian anchor who was most well known as one of the founding anchors of Doordarshan and was a recipient of the Nari Shakti Puraskar, the highest civilian award for women in India.

== Life ==
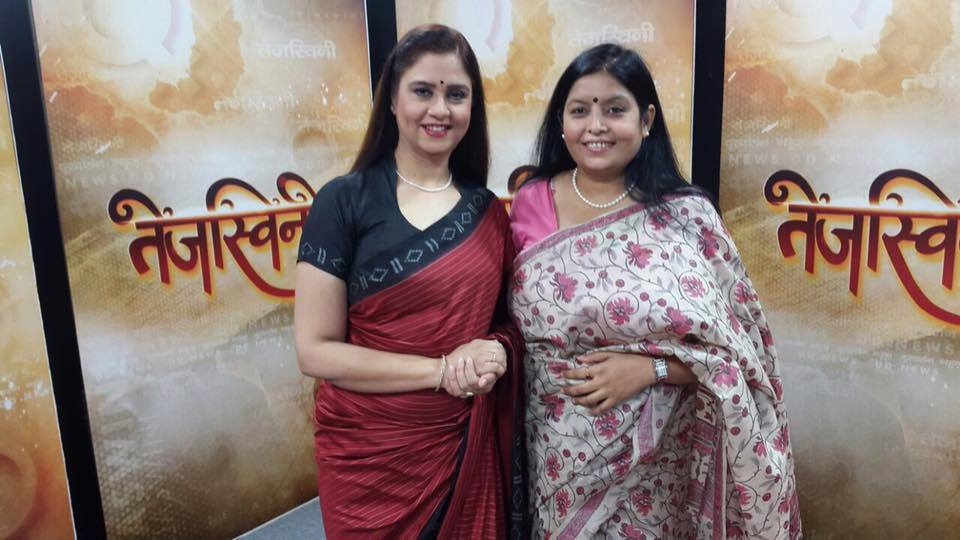
Dr. Rashmi Tiwari (right) one of the Tejaswinis with Neelam Sharma (left)

Through her show Tejaswini, Neelum focused on women achievers of India. She was also a documentary filmmaker, having over 60 films to her name. She started her career with Doordarshan in 1995 and was associated with the channel for over 20 years. She died on 17 August 2019 at the age of 50 due to cancer.
