= DD Madhya Pradesh =

Indian public television channel

Doordarshan Madhya Pradesh
- Type: Broadcast television network
- Country: India
- Availability: India and parts of Asia, China and Gulf Countries.
- Owner: Prasar Bharati
- Launch date: 20 October 1992
- Former names: Doordarshan Kendra Bhopal, DD Bhopal
- Official website: www.ddbhopal.nic.in

Doordarshan Madhya Pradesh often abbreviated as DD Madhya Pradesh (Hindi: दूरदर्शन मध्यप्रदेश) is a 24-hour regional satellite TV channel primarily telecasting from Doordarshan Kendra Bhopal (DDK Bhopal) and is a part of the state-owned Doordarshan television network. It was previously known as DD-11 Madhya pradesh.

It primarily serves the Indian state of Madhya Pradesh.

== History ==
The studio of Doordarshan Kendra Bhopal was commissioned on 20 October 1992. It started as a Regional Kendra and has ever since played a major role as a Public Service Broadcaster for viewers of the state. It has enormously enriched the ethos of this land while projecting and promoting the cultural heritage of the State.

== Language ==
Although the main language of transmission is Hindi, yet programmes in other dialects which are spoken in the different parts of Madhya Pradesh viz. Bagheli, Bundeli, Nimari & Malvi are also included in the telecasts.

== Technology ==
- Technical Facilities at DDK

Doordarshan Kendra Bhopal was commissioned on 20 October 1992. There are two Studios – A of an area of 374 Sq.m. and Continuity Booth (Studio-B) of an area of 50 Sq.m. two Transmitters (DD-I & DD-News) of 10 KW each, one Earth Station Unlinking the Regional Service of M.P., one OB Van for outdoor live coverage's and one DSNG Van for Mobile unlinking.

POST PRODUCTION FACILITY

There is a separate post production section having 3 nos. of edit suites with voice over facility, each edit suite having following component of the equipment. Edit Suit-1[A/B Roll edit suit with DVE cum Video switcher] VM (Snell & Wilcox), Edit Controller AJ 850, Audio mixer (12 Channel), CD Player, Phone in console, move CG 2001, DVC pro AJ-D455E, PVW-2800P, PVW-2800P Edit Suit-2 [Beta Edit Suit with FXE-120P] FXE-120P, PVW-2800P, DVC Pro AJ-D455E, BVW-70P Edit Suit-3 [A/B Roll edit suit with DVE cum Video switcher & DVCPRO50 digital VCRs.Beta] VM (Snell & Wilcox), Edit Controller AJ 850, Audio mixer (12 Channel), DVCPro 50 AJ- SD 965E (Player-I), PVW-2800P, (Player-2), DVCPRO50 AJ-SD965 (recorder).

Computerized editing system is also available at this Centre having the latest state of the art technology used for editing/post production for better presentation of the programmes namely, NLE, Media 100, DPS Velocity, QUATTRUS NLE, 3D Graphics & ISLEWIZ Computer graphics.

== DTH availability ==
The satellite channel of DD Madhya Pradesh is available on various DTH platforms since 2013 and is mandatory for all DTH & Cable Operators to show Doordarshan channels.

- Videocon D2H - Channel no. 896
- Dish TV - Channel no. 820
- Airtel Digital TV - Channel no. 350
- Sun Direct - Channel no. 648
- DD Free Dish - Channel no. 82
- Tata Sky - Channel no. 1175

== See also ==
- List of programs broadcast by DD National
- All India Radio
- Ministry of Information and Broadcasting
- DD Free Dish (formerly DD Direct Plus)
- List of South Asian television channels by country
