= DD News =

Indian public broadcast television news channel

- Type: Television Channel
- Country: India
- Broadcast area: Asia, Europe
- Network: Doordarshan
- Headquarters: New Delhi, Delhi, India

Programming
- Language: Hindi
- Picture format: 1080i HDTV

Ownership
- Owner: Prasar Bharati, Ministry of Information and Broadcasting
- Key people: Navneet Kumar Sehgal (Chairman); Gaurav Dwivedi, IAS (CEO); Sudhir Chaudhary (Editor-in-chief)
- Sister channels: DD National; DD India; DD Sports; DD Bharati; DD Kisan; DD Retro

History
- Launched: 15 August 1999 (original); 3 November 2003; 23 years ago (relaunch)
- Replaced: DD Metro (2003)
- Closed: 25 January 2002 (original) (4 years, 80 days)
- Replaced by: DD Bharati (2002)
- Former names: Doordarshan Kendra Delhi, DD News and Current Affairs (15 August 1999 - 11 September 2001)

Links
- Website: Official Website

Availability

Terrestrial
- Digital terrestrial television: Check local frequencies

Streaming media
- Waves: Watch Live
- National Informatics Centre: Webcast NIC
- YouTube: Official Channel

DD News is an Indian free-to-air Hindi-language public broadcast television news channel, owned and operated by Doordarshan, one of the two divisions of Prasar Bharati under the Ministry of Information and Broadcasting, Government of India. It was launched on 11 November 2003 as the nation's first 24-hour news channel to be available on both cable and terrestrial platforms to replace DD Metro. The proposal of its launch was subsequently approved by the Union Cabinet in a meeting held on 3 October 2003.

DD Metro was converted into a 24-hour TV news channel, into DD News, which launched on 3 November 2003. During its initial years, its terrestrial reach was 21.6% by area and 44.9% by population of India.

In 2019, international sister channel DD India became the exclusive channel for English News and Current Affairs from Doordarshan. After that parent body Prasar Bharati's CEO claimed that DD News will be "100% Hindi soon", but is yet to be implemented because of availability of content to be aired. Special feature of the channel includes a Sanskrit news show called Vaarta.

The DD News mobile app for Android and Apple was launched on 7 May 2015 by the then Minister of Information and Broadcasting Arun Jaitley. The app aims to instantly communicate news on a 24x7 basis.

== History ==
Initially, after experiencing a partnership with CNN, Doordarshan launched a news and current affairs channel DD CNNi in 1995. DD was catering to an international audience via its DD International channel, and also providing English news, views, current affairs and infotainment programmings to Indian audiences via its DD3 channel. Its DD National and DD Metro channels were also delivering news content, and many private producers also had their news programmes on DD channels. They converted it to DD Bharati on 26 January 2002.

Later DD again launched its DD News channel by replacing DD Metro in 2003 and assured its availability on terrestrial mode. DD News is India's only 24-hour terrestrial news channel. It formerly telecast over 16 hours of live news bulletins in Hindi, English, Sanskrit, and Urdu. News headlines and breaking news updates were made accessible via SMS.

DD News also carries financial information about stocks and commodities, accessing information from the National Stock Exchange of India (NSE) and the Bombay Stock Exchange (BSE) in addition to leading commodity exchanges including the National Commodity and Derivatives Exchange (NCDEX) and the MCX Stock Exchange.

In January 2019, Prasar Bharati converted it into a Hindi news channel, while DD India was converted into an English news channel.

On 20 April 2024, DD News announced changing its logo. The old logo, red in colour, was changed to saffron. The change was criticised by several opposition political parties, alleging a move of saffronisation by the ruling party, BJP. BJP denied the claim saying that Doordarshan originally was launched with a saffron logo in 1959 and that the objection towards it is a display of hate against bhagwa and hindus. Prasar Bharti CEO, Gaurav Dwivedi claimed that the new logo is orange in colour and that it is a change of "visual aesthetic".

== Former DD News Anchors ==
- Pratima Puri
- Salma Sultan
- Shammi Narang
- Sarla Maheshwari
- Neelum Sharma

== Mobile application ==
Information and Broadcasting Minister Arun Jaitley on 7 May 2015 launched a mobile application of DD News that will provide DD News a platform to instantly communicate news on a 24×7 basis.

== See also ==
- List of programs broadcast by DD National
- All India Radio
- DD Free Dish
- Doordarshan
- List of South Asian television channels by country
- Ministry of Information and Broadcasting India
- Television in India
