= Raagam (radio channel) =

Bangalore; India
- Broadcast area: India
- Frequency: 100.1 MHz
- Branding: "This is Raagam Twenty Four Seven DTH – Indian Classical Music Channel"

Programming
- Format: Indian Classical Music Channel

Ownership
- Owner: All India Radio
- Operator: AIR Bengaluru

History
- First air date: 26 January 2016
- Former call signs: Amrithavarshini

Links
- Webcast: http://raagam.airbengaluru.com/

Raagam is an Indian niche radio channel owned and operated by All India Radio. The channel was launched on Republic Day on 26 January 2016. Raagam is programmed to offer and devoted to classical music. The channel is a 24-hour internet radio channel, which represents a mosaic of Hindustani and Carnatic classical music through DTH facility.

Raagam was launched at a function in Bengaluru on 26 January 2016. The channel was in the Public Domain with AIR's Mobile App, "NewsOnAIR" which made available on Android, iOS platforms from 6 PM on 18 March 2013.
