= DD National =

Indian entertainment television channel

- Country: India
- Broadcast area: Worldwide
- Network: Doordarshan
- Headquarters: New Delhi, India

Programming
- Languages: Hindi; English
- Picture format: 1080i HDTV

Ownership
- Owner: Prasar Bharati, Ministry of Information and Broadcasting
- Parent: Doordarshan
- Sister channels: See List of channel Doordarshan owned channels

History
- Launched: 15 September 1959; 67 years ago
- Former names: Doordarshan TV (1959–1984); DD1 (1984–1993)

Links
- Webcast: DD National on Waves
- Website: Official Website

Availability

Terrestrial
- DVB-T2 (India): Check local frequencies
- DD Free Dish: Channel 2 (SD); Channel 136 (HD)

Streaming media
- YouTube: Official Channel
- Jio TV+: LCN 114

DD National (formerly DD1) is an Indian state-owned entertainment television channel, founded by the Government of India, owned by the Ministry of Information and Broadcasting. It is the flagship channel of Doordarshan, launched on 15 September 1959. India's public service broadcaster, and the oldest and most widely available terrestrial television channel in India.

== History ==
=== 1959 to 1982: Beginnings ===
Station identification of Doordarshan during its administration by All India Radio, circa 1960s.

On 15 September 1959 at the studio of All India Radio, Delhi, the first TV channel in India started an experimental telecast with a small transmitter and a makeshift studio, adopting the brand Doordarshan, Hindi for television. Until 1965, AIR was responsible for the programming production and overall control over content as the television service began to assume overall production. Krishi Darshan, Chaupaal, Doordarshan Samachar, and Kalyani were among the first generation of programmes produced for the channel. In 1976, the split of the TV and radio services was made official with Doordarshan assuming overall control for television broadcasting. By the time the Satellite Instructional Television Experiment (SITE) commenced in 1975, Doordarshan coordinated with AIR as the producer of programs aired in the targeted areas of several Indian states. It would foreshadow the start of the channel's road to be a nationally aired station. By the time SITE had begun, the channel had only been seen in several major Indian cities, airing in some as a trilingual station with a news service in regional languages. Doordarshan operated using the black and white NTSC format under a UNESCO grant. When television started in neighbouring Sri Lanka, the country opted for the PAL format (which was later adopted by Doordarshan in 1982) and television sets manufactured by Japanese companies saw their sales skyrocket. The stark contrast between Doordarshan's SITE-influenced schedule and ITN Sri Lanka's schedule built mainly on imports showed Doordarshan's inferiority at the time.

DD's regional news opt-outs aired on regional stations as a breakaway from programming from New Delhi would plant the seeds for the expansion of the network from one channel to many in the years to come.

=== 1982 to 1992: Success ===
Doordarshan was a co-partner in the launch of the Indian National Satellite System in the 1980s and took notice of its potential. The central government, moved by the INSS's successes, began planning to bring Doordarshan as a national channel aired to millions of Indians. On 15 August 1982 on the Indian Independence Day Doordarshan introduced a national colour telecast service from its own TV studio in Mandi House, New Delhi using PAL colour. It broadcast the celebrations in full color from the Red Fort marking the 35th year of India's nationhood.

On 9 August 1984, as Doordarshan launched its second channel for the metro/urban audience called DD2, the existing first channel was renamed DD1 and started regular transmission of nationwide satellite broadcasts from New Delhi to viewers all over India via a network of regional transmitters. In the same year, DD1 started the telecast of sponsored TV serials which were produced by established filmmakers and many film production firms for the channel. These drama series were sponsored by Indian companies which, with their commercials, brought much needed revenue for the DD network. DD1's Hum Log was the first sponsored TV serial of Indian television and started airing with its series premiere on 7 July 1984.

After the success of Hum Log, many other TV producers and filmmakers produced many memorable series aired on DD1. Some of them, together with the acquired foreign language programming of the period, were , Yeh Jo Hai Zindagi, Buniyaad, Malgudi Days, Shrikant, Ramayan, Bharat Ek Khoj, Mahabharat, Mirza Ghalib, The Sword of Tipu Sultan, Chanakya, The Great Maratha, Vishwamitra, Uttar Ramayan, Buddha, Surabhi, Tiltliyan, Taaraa, Khaandaan, 13 Panne, Air Hostess, Waah Janaab, Tamas, Vikram Aur Betal, Tenali Rama, Kirdaar, Singhasan Battisi, Guldasta, Mrignayani, Shrikant, Sadgati, Nukkad, Lot Pot, Mungerilal Ke Haseen Sapne, Bhim Bhawani, Kakkaji Kahin, Paying Guest, Ados Pados, Upannyas, Fauji, Karamchand, Byomkesh Bakshi, Samandar, Param Vir Chakra, Wagle Ki Duniya, Buniyaad, Kachchi Dhoop, Chunauti, Mahanagar, Phir Wahi Talash, Umeed, Subah, Mr. Yogi, Ek Bhool, Chote Babu, Yugantar, Kehkashan, Yatra, Rajani, Street Hawk, Udaan, Gaata Jaaye Banjara, Phool Khile Hain Gulsan Gulsan, Pingu, Circus, Taaj Mahel, Palash ke phool, Tumhare liye, Khubsuraat, and Dada Dadi Ki Kahaniyan. Many of these productions ended up being high rating successes for DD1. Of these, Ramayan ended up not just being DD1's most expensive Indian TV drama of the 80s, but also the highest rating drama of its time. While the first generation of these dramas were filmed in the same manner as Bollywood movies of the period, 1986-87 saw many of these being produced using videotape.

DD National served as the home for NDTV's smash Friday news programme The World This Week from 1984 to 1995. During those years, DD National also aired NDTV-produced network coverage of federal and state elections and budget deliberations of the Parliament of India.

=== 1992 to 2010: Competition ===
After the entry of private channels in India, Doordarshan started facing strong competition from Zee TV in 1992. Even though in those days, cable and satellite channels were not easily available, DD1 was still ruling the chart, as it was the only channel available terrestrially. In 1993, Doordarshan revamped both channels for a stronger competition. DD1 was relaunched as its present name, DD National, while DD2 received the DD Metro brand.

With the telecast of popular TV shows like Chandrakanta, Alif Laila, Tehkikaat, Chitrahaar, Udaan, Byomkesh Bakshi, Farmaan, Katha Sagar, Neem Ka Ped and Chanakya, DD National retained viewers and the high ratings, but Doordarshan Board focused more on its sister channel, DD Metro, which was aimed to compete with Zee TV. In the meantime, the channel became one of the popular destinations of TV viewers with its shows like Junoon, Superhit Muquabala, and Azanabi, many of its programming being also aired on DD National either on simulcast or tape delay.

In 1995, when most of the channels like DD Metro, Zee TV, Home TV, STAR Plus and Sony TV started focusing on their prime time slots, DD National was still stacked with its role and responsibilities, as at the time it was the only source of news on TV. To provide more entertainment, DD National opened an afternoon slot for housewives, with the telecast of Shanti. To support the success of Shanti, many other shows like Swabhimaan, Farz, and Yug were introduced and all of them were praised.

In 1997, Prasar Bharati, the parent body of Doordarshan, was formed. While private channels like Zee TV, STAR Plus and Sony TV started airing high budget TV serials from top production houses, DD National was still doing the best in afternoon slots with Kasam, Itihaas, Agni, Aprajita, Aurat, Ardhangini, Sanjog, Deewar, Aane Wala Pal, Waqt Ki Raftaar and other programs. There were a few notable programs like India's Most Wanted, Gul Sanobar, Surabhi, Noorjahan, Om Namah Shivay, Jai Ganga Maiya, and Suraag in prime time, but those were not enough to give competition to private channels.

In late 1997, DD National started airing Mukesh Khanna's Shaktimaan, which was the blockbuster TV serial in Indian history. In 2000, after tasting success with India's Most Wanted, Jasoos Vijay and Suraag in prime time, Prasar Bharati decided to revamp both channels, and many new serials were introduced on DD National, but very few of them were successful because of a limited prime time slots of 9 to 10:30, compared to 8 to 11 for other channels. New channels like Sahara TV and SAB TV were also performing better than DD channels in prime time.

In 2002, DD offered its time slots to popular filmmakers and got some popular shows of the time. Ramanand Sagar's Aankhen, BR Chopra's Aap Beeti, Adhikaari Brothers CID Officer, Kiran Bedi's Galti Kiski, and Time's Dishayen were telecast on the channels and prized by viewers. In 2003, when DD Metro Channel was converted into DD News, Prasar Bharati focused on its DD national channels, and shows like Meher, Miss India, Shikwah, Kayamat, Kaanch, and Phir Bhi Dil Hai Hindustani were introduced. Phir Bhi Dil Hai Hindustani achieved unprecedented ratings and became DD National's biggest blockbuster during this period. In 2005, Hawayein starring Ravi Kishan and Malini Kapoor became one of the most popular shows and also won a title of Best TV Serial of the Year at the ITA Awards.

In this period, DD introduced many popular serials like Air Hostess, Wo Huye Na hamare, Kyunki Jeena Isi Ka Naam Hai, Tum Dena Sath Mera, Hari Mirchi Lal Mirchi, Soni Mahiwaal, Wheel Smart Shrimati, Krazzy Kiya Re, Chandramukhi, Jo Kahunga Sach Kahunga, Tahreer – Munshi Premchand Ki, and Kashmakash Zindagi Ki.

=== 2010 to 2020: Loss of prominence ===
At prime time, DD was still not able to compete with private channels, and it also started losing its peak position in afternoon slots to re-runs on other channels. In 2012, DD started airing Ekta Kapoor's Pavitra Bandhan, Sanjay Leela Bhansali's Saraswatichandra and a few other serials. In 2013, it reduced its window for regional telecasts to 4 PM-7 PM, and stopped airing news at night, which added one and a half hour to its prime time. To enrich the new four-hour long prime time, DD brought TV serials like Gora, Bharat Ki Shaan, Baba Aazmi's Yeh Kaha Aa Gaye Hum, Dil Jo Kah Na Saka, and Sanjeev Kapoor's Chef Ki Rasoi. It also launched a campaign for its afternoon slots, DD Dophar Aapke Ghar, by airing serials like Amrita, Anudamini, Aisa Prem Kahan, and Chupau Kaise Laaga Chunari Me Daag.

In November 2014, Prasar Bharati revamped DD National with the new slogan, Dēsh Kā Apnā Channel (which translates to "the country's own channel" in Hindi) with a new theme and serials like Happy Homes, Khwabon Ke Darmiyaan, Khamosh Sa Afsaana, Dard Ka Rishta, Shama, Paltan, Stree Shakti, Zindagi Ek Bhanwar, and Janmon Ka Bandhan. Initially, these shows did better, but later, as TRP fell in 2016, Prasar Bharati decided to go for a slot sale policy and invited bids from makers for its 07:00 p.m. to 11:00 p.m. slot. Serials like Krantijyoti Savitribai Phule, U-Turn, and Munidhar were aired in the afternoon slots. However, the strategy was not enough for its revival.

In late 2016, the slot sale policy of DD was put on hold by the government. Although many production houses like Balaji Telefilms and SaaiBaba Telefilms had won slots for airing their programs, it could not be commenced as the policy was reported for a review. From 2017, Doordarshan has been repeating programs from its library and does not telecast any new serials.

=== 2020 to present ===
Due to COVID-19, when all other TV channels were stopped shooting for fresh episodes of their serials, Doordarshan decided to re-telecast its blockbuster drama programming from the 1980s and 1990s. DD National telecast repeats of Ramanand Sagar's Ramayan, Luv Kush, Shri Krishna, Mukesh Khanna's Shaktimaan, Shrimaan Shrimati, Shahrukh Khan's Circus, Byomkesh Bakshi, Chanakya, Dekh Bhai Dekh, The Jungle Book and many more. At the same time its sister channel DD Bharati telecast BR Chopra's Mahabharat, Sai Baba, Alif Laila, and B. R. Chopra's Vishnu Puran among many more hit series.

This move turned out to be a Magic Lamp for the Doordarshan network, as the rerun broadcasts for these drama productions broke all TRP records. First episode of Ramayana gained the highest TRP rantings since 2015 for all Hindi TV channels of all categories. DD National instantly became 1st in the TRP chart and with its shows Ramayana and Shaktimaan were ranked #1st and #5th, respectively in ratings. Note that, since the 2010s DD National was out of top 10 in Hindi GEC ratings.

After the end of Ramayan's broadcast, Uttar Ramayan and Shri Krishna too enjoyed the first rank in the BARC's TRP charts.

Its sister channel DD Bharati, which was even not in notice since its inception in 2000, became the 5th most-watched TV channel in TRP charts, with Mahabharat ranked second in TRP charts.

Following the success of the reruns, DD National finally regained its status as the country's number 1 television station. Bolstered by high ratings of the programming repeats, Doordarshan launched DD Retro on 13 April 2020, with its library mainly composed of many of Doordarshan's legendary drama series.

Shortly after Prasar Bharati changed its logo, the broadcaster announced the rebranding of DD National, including its logo, which would be in effect from 15 August 2022, coinciding with the celebrations of Indian Independence day and in celebration of 40 years of nationwide broadcasts. The new logo made its debut on 14 August, one day before the holiday.

== Notable anchors ==
- Minu Talwar
- Neelum Sharma
- Nidhi Kumar
- Pratima Puri - the channel's first news reader
- Rini Simon Khanna
- Salma Sultan
- Shammi Narang
- Sunit Tandon

== Sports broadcasting ==
Usually, all One Day and Twenty20 international cricket matches involving or hosted by India are shown live on DD National. It also broadcast the 2014 Men's Hockey World Cup matches involving India, and also the semi-final and final matches. The ICC Champions Trophy is also being broadcast by DD National.

These matches are broadcast under compulsory simulcasts from pay television rightsholders such as Star Sports, under laws requiring sporting events of national importance to be simulcast by DD National. In 2017, in response to complaints by Tata Play, the Supreme Court of India ruled that these simulcasts are only allowed to be carried by on the free-to-air terrestrial and the DD Free Dish platform, and that DD National must be blacked out on pay television providers in defense of the pay-television rightsholder when such events are broadcast.

Since then, Prasar Bharati decided to telecast cricket matches exclusively on the 1.0 feed of DD Sports, being made available for DD Free Dish users, while a different feed, known as DD Sports 2.0, was launched on DTH and cable TV platforms.

== Editorial independence ==
The idea of autonomy for the government-controlled Doordarshan was first mooted when the Janata Party came to power in 1977, in the aftermath of Emergency when the Doordarshan ended up as the government's mouthpiece. The idea was revived when the Janata Dal took office in 1989. The following governments showed no interest in autonomy despite making politically correct noises about autonomy.

== Test cards ==
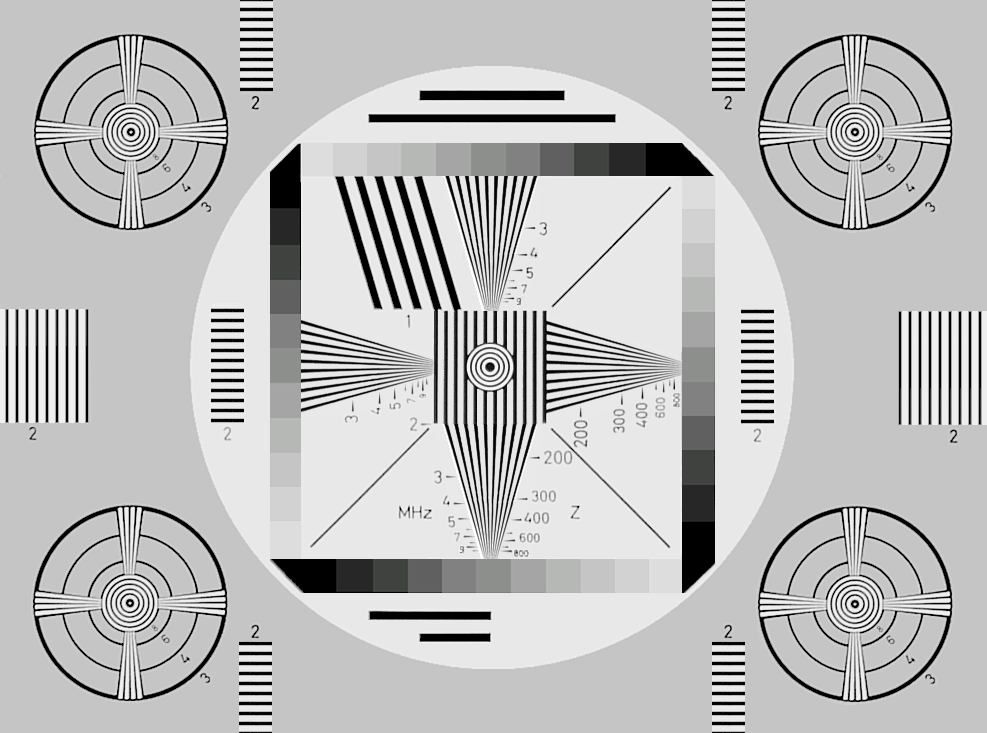
Telefunken T05 monochrome test card, used on DD National from 1959 until the early-1980s.

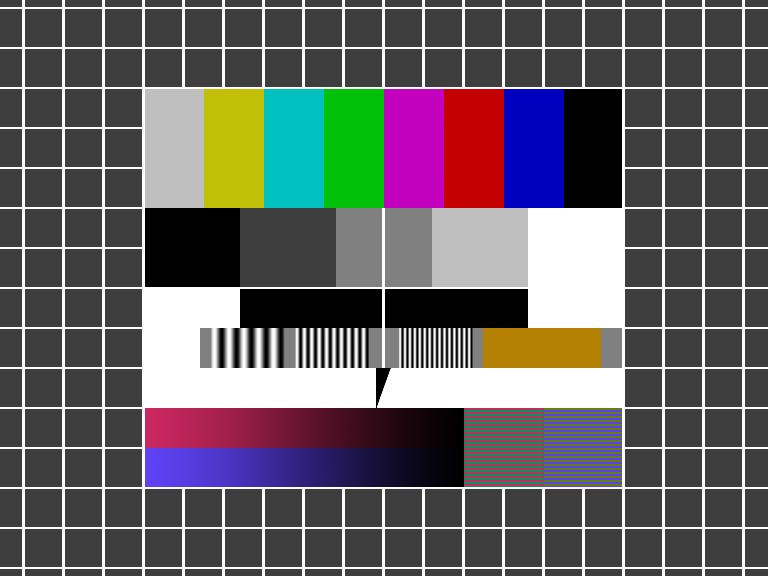
Telefunken FuBK variant used on DD National from its launch of colour broadcasts in the early-1980s.

== See also ==
- List of television channels in India
