= DD India =

Indian state-owned international television news channel

- Logo used since 2024
- Type: Television Channel
- Country: India
- Broadcast area: Worldwide (except Pakistan and North Korea)
- Network: Doordarshan
- Headquarters: New Delhi, India

Programming
- Language: English
- Picture format: 1080i HDTV

Ownership
- Owner: Prasar Bharati, Ministry of Information and Broadcasting
- Sister channels: See list of Doordarshan owned channels

History
- Launched: 14 March 1995 (as DD International); 2000 (as DD World); 26 January 2002 (as DD India)
- Former names: DD International; DD World

Links
- Website: Official Website

Availability

Streaming media
- YouTube: Available on YouTube
- Waves: Watch Live
- KBS+: Watch Live

DD India, is an Indian state-owned international English language news and current affairs channel from India. The service is also aimed at the overseas market, similar to WION, CNN International, BBC News, DW, VOA, France24, NHK World-Japan, Arirang, CNA, RT and RTR-Planeta and broadcasts through satellite and cable operators throughout the world as well as online and through its mobile app. It became a full-fledged English news and current affairs channel in January 2019, followed by a decision of the parent Prasar Bharati's board. The total budget provided by the government to this channel is ₹2,640 crore (US$270 million).

DD India, a public service television news channel, has been the second most-watched English news channel in India since 2017 after Republic TV. It became the most-watched channel in February 2019, according to the Indian newspaper Live Mint. In the first quarter of 2019, DD India and Republic TV have alternated for the most-watched channel position in the English channel news weekly ratings as measured by BARC India group. Prasar Bharati launched the HD simulcast for DD India on 3 October 2020, on its free-to-air DTH service, DD Free Dish.

== History ==
DD India was launched on 14 March 1995 as DD International. It was rebranded as DD World in 2000 and again in 2002 as DD India. It is owned and operated by Doordarshan, India's state-owned television network. The international broadcaster featured some original programming, such as dramas, comedy series, talk shows, documentaries, and re-runs of popular TV shows from other Indian television channels. In addition, it also aired some TV shows in other Indian languages, such as Urdu, Punjabi, Tamil, Telugu etc.

In the United States, the channel was launched on 26 July 2007, and is available on DirecTV.

On 1 January 2019, it was relaunched as an English-language news channel, as Doordashan turned its already-dedicated news channel, DD News, into a Hindi-language-only service, while the international feed of DD National was launched.

In September 2023, DD India was rebranded in time for the G20 Summit (hosted by India at the time).

== See also ==
- Lists of television channels in India
- Doordarshan Network
