= Prasar Bharati =

Public broadcaster in India

Agency overview
- Formed: 23 November 1997; 28 years ago
- Jurisdiction: Government of India
- Headquarters: New Delhi, India
- Minister responsible: Ashwini Vaishnaw
- Agency executives: Prasoon Joshi, Chairperson; Gaurav Dwivedi (IAS), CEO
- Parent department: Ministry of Information and Broadcasting
- Child agencies: Doordarshan (Television network); All India Radio (Radio network); Waves (OTT Platform); DD Free Dish (DTH Service)
- Website: www.prasarbharati.gov.in

Prasar Bharati (Sanskrit: प्रसार भारती, lit. 'Spreading the Indian Voice'), officially translated in English as Indian Broadcasting Corporation, is India's state-owned public broadcaster, headquartered in New Delhi, India. It is a statutory autonomous body set up by an Act of Parliament. It comprises Doordarshan, the television broadcaster, and All India Radio, the radio broadcaster, both of which were previously media units of the Ministry of Information and Broadcasting. The Parliament of India passed the Prasar Bharati Act in 1990 to grant this autonomy, but it was not enacted until 15 September 1997.

Navneet Kumar Sehgal took office as chairman of Prasar Bharati in March, 2024 following Dr. A. Surya Prakash who served till February, 2020 . Gaurav Dwivedi is the CEO of Prasar Bharati, having succeeded Shashi Shekhar Vempati, who served until June 2022.

The Reuters Institute Digital News Report 2021 stated that DD News and All India Radio are the most trusted news brands in India.

== Prasar Bharati Act ==
The Prasar Bharati Act provides for the establishment of a broadcasting corporation, known as Prasar Bharati, and defines its composition, functions, and powers. The Act grants autonomy to All India Radio and to Doordarshan, both of which were previously under government control. The Act received the assent of the President of India on 12 September 1990 after being unanimously passed by the Parliament. It was finally implemented in November 1997. The passage of the Prasar Bharati Act transferred all property, assets, debts, liabilities, payments due, as well as all suits and legal proceedings involving All India Radio and Doordarshan (transl. Television) to Prasar Bharati.

The organisation began as All India Radio (AIR) and later expanded to include Doordarshan (DD) to provide television services. Finally, Prasar Bharati (PB) was established through an Act of Parliament.

== Composition ==
The Prasar Bharati Act vests the general superintendence, direction, and management of affairs of the Corporation in the Prasar Bharati Board, which may exercise all such powers and do all such acts and things as may be exercised or done by the corporation.

The Prasar Bharati Board consists of:

- Chairman
- One Executive Member
- One Member (Finance)
- One Member (Personnel)
- Six Part-time Members
- Director-General (Akashvani), ex officio
- Director-General (Doordarshan), ex officio
- One representative of the Union Ministry of Information and Broadcasting (India), to be nominated by that Ministry; and
- Two representatives of the employees, of whom one shall be elected by the engineering staff from amongst themselves, and one shall be elected by the other employees from amongst themselves.

The President of India appoints the chairman and the other members, except the ex officio members, nominated members, and the elected members. Board meetings must be held at least once every three months each year.

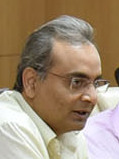
Gaurav Dwivedi in 2016

=== Current members of the Prasar Bharati board ===
- Chairman – Prasoon Joshi
- Chief Executive Officer – Gaurav Dwivedi
- Member (Finance) – Rajeev Roy
- Member (Personnel) – Rajeev Bhardwaj

==== Part-time members ====
- Additional Secretary and Representative of Ministry of Information & Broadcasting – Ms. Neerja Sekhar
- Ex Officio members – Vacant
- Part-time member – Shaina NC, Alok Agrawal, Ashok Kumar Tandon, Sanjay Gupta
- The chairman is appointed by the President.
- Member (Personnel) – Additional charge with CEO Gaurav Dwivedi
- Ex-Officio Members – Vacant
- Nominated Members – 2 Vacancies

== Strategic interventions (2017 onwards) ==
In May 2020, Doordarshan and All India Radio began broadcasting weather reports for Mirpur, Muzaffarabad, and Gilgit in Pakistan-administered Kashmir during their prime time news bulletins. Pakistan rejected this move, calling it a "legally void" action aimed at altering the region's status.

== Reforms in public broadcasting in India (2017 onwards) ==
Obsolete technologies are being replaced with newer ones. Starting in 2017, over 1,200 old analog transmitters have been phased out, and 23 digital transmitters have been installed at 19 locations across the country.

== Transformation of All India Radio (2017 onwards) ==
The number of All India Radio stations increased from 413 in 2017 to 485 in 2021. All India Radio's FM stations now reach 70 percent of the Indian population.

== Digital Growth since 2017 ==
Since 2017, Prasar Bharati has shifted its focus to a digital-first approach, yielding promising results. Its digital network now includes over 300 Twitter handles, 190 YouTube channels, multiple news websites, and the NewsOnAir app, which has over two million downloads. Viewership growth of the digital network has increased by 66% since 2017. Digital has now become integral to all Prasar Bharati activities, with over 800 digital uploads happening daily across the network. This ensures that all in-house-produced news and non-news content is available for on-demand consumption on digital platforms. The NewsOnAir app has been a game-changer, offering over 270 live streams of radio and TV broadcasts.

Between 2017 and 2022, Prasar Bharati's digital platforms experienced significant growth, with many of its YouTube channels joining the Million Club, and several others nearing the milestone. This has contributed to a total YouTube subscription base of over two crore. In 2021, more than 185 YouTube channels from Doordarshan and All India Radio collectively garnered over a billion views, with their total 'watch time' reaching 94 million hours for the year. In 2021, YouTube channels of both DD News and DD National surpassed 4 million subscribers. Prasar Bharati's NewsOnAir app recorded a listenership of over 214 million. Additionally, Prasar Bharati's digital platforms in the remote areas of Northeast India achieved notable milestones, collectively amassing more than 220 million views and over 1 million subscribers on YouTube.

== Archives – Preserving India’s history and culture ==
Prasar Bharati's National Archives, India's oldest and largest audio-visual archive, houses an exclusive collection of rare historical recordings, including interviews, documentaries, features, music, radio plays, and more. It serves as a treasure trove of performances by great artists who have enriched India's cultural, music, and dance heritage. The archive also holds rare media assets related to significant events such as Independence Day celebrations, Republic Day parades, national addresses by prime ministers and presidents, and other important broadcasts since the inception of broadcasting in India. These invaluable assets are preserved in various formats, including sound recordings and audio-visual footage across genres like music, dance, drama, interviews, short films, documentaries, and feature films.

Archival activities in India began with the transcription service for radio recordings on 3 April 1954, focusing on transcribing speeches by dignitaries, especially the presidents and prime ministers of India. While informal archiving existed before 1954, the establishment of the transcription service formalised the process. Doordarshan Archives was founded in 2004 with the goal of digitising and preserving valuable audio-visual footage. Initially, the archival departments of AIR and Doordarshan operated separately under their respective divisions. However, in 2018, these separate setups were merged to form a unified entity, Prasar Bharati Archives, which operates under a single umbrella.

Radio autobiographies are a unique collection in the archives of Prasar Bharati. These recordings feature the audio autobiographies of eminent personalities who have made significant contributions to various fields of nation-building. Beyond offering personal anecdotes about their lives and achievements, these Radio Autobiographies also serve as a chronicle of contemporary Indian history, narrated through the life stories of these influential figures.

In his radio autobiography recorded by All India Radio in 1986, India's leading industrialist and former chairman of the Tata Group, Jehangir Ratanji Dadabhoy Tata, recalled his memories of the Emergency era and his conversations with Indira Gandhi and Sanjay Gandhi about the excesses during that period. Reflecting on one of his interactions with Indira Gandhi at the beginning of the Emergency, JRD Tata said, “When she declared Emergency, I went to see her. I said, Indira ji, why did you have to put all these people in jail, including old people like Morarji Desai? She said that because they were plotting against me. I can't have people against me from within.”

In an interaction with All India Radio in January 1986, Sahitya Akademi Award winner and renowned poet Amrita Pritam stated that in popular culture, people often categorise Hinduism as one of the religions alongside Islam, Christianity, and others. However, she emphasised that in reality, Hinduism is not just a religion; rather, everyone born in Hindustan is a Hindu.

This treasure trove is being digitised and made available on the Prasar Bharati Archives YouTube channel in the public interest for academic purposes. In addition to the content mentioned above, audio recordings of around 50 original Constituent Assembly speeches from 1946 to 1949 have been uploaded to this channel.

Priceless recordings of maestros such as Ustad Bismillah Khan, MS Subbulakshmi, Begum Akhtar, M. Balamuralikrishna, and the epic Ramcharitmanas, among others, are part of the Prasar Bharati archives and are available at the counter at Akashvani Bhawan on Parliament Street in Delhi.

Prasar Bharati Archives has made a significant contribution to the Pradhanmantri Sangrahalaya, inaugurated by PM Modi on 14 April 2022, providing about 206 hours of audio and 53 hours of video content. This includes key historical broadcasts such as Nehru's address to the Constituent Assembly (Tryst with Destiny), Broadcast to the Nation on the 1st Independence Day, Oath-taking ceremony, Inauguration of the Atomic Energy Establishment and Opening of the 1st Atomic Reactor, Declaration of Emergency, Address to the UN General Assembly, Non-Aligned Conference, Inauguration of Delhi Metro, and much more.

Prasar Bharati Archives has compiled decade-by-decade YouTube playlists of rare audio-video content from the 1930s to the 2000s. The playlists capture moments in India's history for academics and the public alike.

Decade	Playlist
1930s	https://www.youtube.com/watch?v=oqfGcPvP14o&list=PL97ZfRkZjejJQd8XKfoDhAX_Iv32h-5yu
1940s	https://www.youtube.com/watch?v=8n9c9qdZoVI&list=PL97ZfRkZjejLA2EXa_gO4VJIqtg21T4et
1950s	https://www.youtube.com/watch?v=tOAkGtIU0Zg&list=PL97ZfRkZjejKZjtmI4-3ZsmsNYtiSj0vs
1960s	https://www.youtube.com/watch?v=qPgMZuu-7cc&list=PL97ZfRkZjejJFDr8ekjLYMJvo4b2vFQcH
1970s	https://www.youtube.com/watch?v=MBOZ_urMxEU&list=PL97ZfRkZjejI3FjN30c4H4NDcc6_W2Mm4
1980s	https://www.youtube.com/watch?v=tmxKnDi7xMY&list=PL97ZfRkZjejIXgrMm_2OvdA9EBi4516Vs
1990s	https://www.youtube.com/watch?v=zwjLzbr0Dxk&list=PL97ZfRkZjejJvPBCQxGiVUwDru4ZydyrJ
2000s	https://www.youtube.com/watch?v=6p75IT4_8xg&list=PL97ZfRkZjejJkq1H9oQ-u6mPXFEf557Qe

== Controversies ==
In 2010, 24 out of the 30 candidates selected for journalist positions at Doordarshan News were alleged to have been appointed based on political considerations. Notably, one successful candidate was closely related to a former Congress Minister of State for Information and Broadcasting, another was the daughter of a sitting Congress Union minister, and a third was a close relative of Union Commerce Minister Anand Sharma.

The number of applicants called for interviews was increased from 25 to 35 to accommodate the daughter of a Congress politician, who held the 33rd rank and would have otherwise been eliminated at the cut-off stage. Another successful candidate, Anika Kalra Kalha, was not even called for an audition or reporting skills test, with the remark "Did not qualify for this stage" noted in the relevant columns. Additionally, the weightage given to interviews was arbitrarily increased two days before they were held.

In 2014, following allegations that Doordarshan had edited out portions of an interview with then BJP's PM candidate Narendra Modi, Prasar Bharati CEO Jawhar Sircar admitted that some parts of the interview "were apparently edited." He pointed a finger at the I&B Minister Manish Tewari for failing to grant the "operational autonomy" that the public broadcaster had been seeking for years.

In August 2017, Manik Sarkar, the then Chief Minister of Tripura and a member of the Communist Party of India (Marxist), alleged that Doordarshan and All India Radio had refused to broadcast his Independence Day speech unless he revised it.

In September 2017, following instructions from the Ministry of Information and Broadcasting, Doordarshan put on hold the prime time slots that had been auctioned to Ekta Kapoor's Balaji Telefilms and Saaibaba Telefilms.

In September 2017, following a complaint of alleged abuse of dominance regarding infrastructural facilities for FM radio broadcasting, the Competition Commission of India ordered a fresh investigation into Prasar Bharati.

In March 2018, then Prasar Bharati Chairman Dr. A. Surya Prakash stated that the I&B Ministry had been withholding funds from Prasar Bharati since December 2017, and that the broadcaster had used its contingency funds to pay employees' salaries for January and February.

In early 2019, the Union Information and Broadcasting Ministry introduced the draft 'Prasar Bharati (Broadcasting Corporation of India) Amendment Bill, 2019,' which proposed granting the Ministry the power to directly appoint the Directors General of Doordarshan and All India Radio, replacing the existing practice of recruitment through the Prasar Bharati Board. The Bill also sought to abolish the provision for establishing a 'Prasar Bharati Recruitment Board' (PBRB). According to the explanatory note, the PBRB could not be established as required by the Prasar Bharati Act, and the Ministry decided to remove the relevant section of the Act. Shortly after, the notification seeking public feedback on the draft Bill was taken down from the Ministry's website, followed by a notice stating that the matter had been put on hold until further notice.

In April 2019, the office of then Congress President Rahul Gandhi did not respond to Prasar Bharati CEO's request for an interview with Gandhi by DD News. Earlier that month, Congress had submitted a memorandum to the Election Commission, alleging bias in the political coverage by the public broadcaster.

In October 2019, Prasar Bharati suspended an official from the Chennai Doordarshan Kendra, citing "disciplinary proceedings." Media reports suggested that Doordarshan Kendra Assistant Director R Vasumathi had allegedly blocked the telecast of Prime Minister Narendra Modi's speech at IIT Madras.

In March 2020, Prasar Bharati CEO Shashi Shekhar Vempati declined an invitation from the BBC for an awards function, citing the BBC's "one-sided" reporting on the Delhi violence that occurred in February 2020. In his letter to the BBC Director General, Vempati stated, "I must respectfully decline the invitation in view of the recent coverage of the BBC of certain incidents of violence in Delhi."

In October 2021, media reports alleged that Prasar Bharati was shutting down transmissions from DD Kalaburagi and DD Silchar. Taking note of these reports, In response to these reports, Prasar Bharati clarified that the broadcast reform steps to phase out obsolete analog terrestrial TV transmitters were being misrepresented.
