= List of Indian-language radio stations =

This is a list of radio stations that broadcast in Indian languages worldwide.

== India ==
List of Indian language radio stations in India in alphabetical order.

Name	States	Cities	Languages	Operator	Frequency	Website	Listen live
All India Radio	Nationwide	AIR's home service comprises 479 stations, today located across the country, reaching nearly 92% of the country's area and 99.19% of the total population. AIR originates programming in 23 languages and 179 dialects.	23 Languages	Prasar Bharti	Multiple Frequencies	www.prasarbharti.gov.in	Yes
Ananthapuri FM	Kerala	Thiruvananthapuram	Malayalam, Hindi, Tamil	All India Radio	101.90	apfm.in	
AIR FM Rainbow	Odisha, Maharashtra, West Bengal, Delhi, Telangana, Karnataka	Bhubaneswar, Mumbai, Bengaluru, Hyderabad, Kolkata, Delhi	Hindi, English Kannada, Telugu, Bengali	All India Radio	101.3, 102.6, 104	http://allindiaradio.gov.in/	yes
AIR FM Gold	Tamil Nadu, Delhi, West Bengal, Maharashtra, Punjab	Chennai, Delhi, Kolkata, Mumbai, Ludhiana	Hindi, English Kannada, Telugu, Bengali	All India Radio	100.1	http://allindiaradio.gov.in/	yes
Amurthavarshini	Karnataka	Bengaluru	Hindustani Classical music Carnatic Music	All India Radio	100.1		
Theydal FM	Tamil Nadu	Chennai	Tamil	Art Media Network (Pvt) Ltd	89.3	http://theydalfm.blogsport.com	
Amurthavarshini	Karnataka	Bengaluru	Hindustani Classical music Carnatic Music	All India Radio	100.1		
Aamar FM	West Bengal	Kolkata		Bengali	106.2	www.amsiradio.com	
All India Radio	Andhra Pradesh, Arunachal Pradesh		Hindi, Telugu	Prasar Bharati	90.4	allindiaradio.gov.in	
BIG FM	Karnataka, Maharashtra, Madhya Pradesh, Uttar Pradesh, Andhra Pradesh, Kerala, West Bengal, Tamil Nadu, Puducherry	Agra, Aurangabad, Maharashtra, Chennai, Bengaluru, Mumbai, Pune, Nashik, Asansol, Allahabad, Gwalior, Tirupati, Kolkata, Thiruvananthapuram, Mangaluru, Chandigarh	Indian Language Hindi, Telugu	Reliance Broadcast Network	92.7	www.big927fm.com	yes
Chennai Live 104.8 Fm	Tamil Nadu	Chennai	English language		104.8		yes
Club FM	Kerala	Thiruvananthapuram, Alappuzha, Kochi, Thrissur, Kannur		The Mathrubhumi Group	94.30, 104.80	clubfm.in	
Deccan Radio	Andhra Pradesh		Hindi		107.8	www.deccanradio.com	yes
Easy96.com		broadcasts from New York City to Indians in the USA, India and Globally online as well as on iPhones, iPads and Android Apps.	Hindi			www.easy96.com	yes
Fever 104 FM	West Bengal, Maharashtra, Karnataka, Telangana, Tamil Nadu, New Delhi, Uttar Pradesh	Bengaluru, Kolkata, Mumbai Delhi, Hyderabad, Chennai, Lucknow, Kanpur, Agra, Aligarh, Allahabad, Bareilly, Gorakhpur	Kannada, Bengali, Hindi, Tamil	HT Media Ltd	104		
Friends FM	West Bengal	Kolkata		Ananda Offset Pvt Ltd	91.9		
Gyan Vani	Gujarat, Andhra Pradesh, Delhi, Uttar Pradesh, West Bengal	Agra, Ahmedabad, Kolkata, Visakhapatnam, Delhi		Ministry of Human Resource Development	105.6		
Hint FM	Uttar Pradesh	Ghaziabad	Hindi, English		90.8		
Hit 95 FM	Delhi	Delhi	Hindi	Clear Media India Pvt Ltd	95		
Hello FM	Tamil Nadu, Puducherry	Chennai, Coimbatore, Madurai, Trichy, Tirunelveli, Thoothukudi And Puducherry	Tamil	Malar Publications Limited	106.4	www.hello.fm	yes
Hasya Katta Official	Maharashtra & Worldwide	Thane, Mumbai & Worldwide	Marathi, Hindi, English & Sanskrit	Smit Shetye & Hasya Katta Official	Online / Internet	Official Website	yes
IITK Community Radio	Uttar Pradesh	Kanpur	Hindi, English	IIT Kanpur	90.4	www.iitk.ac.in	Yes
MY FM	Chhattisgarh, Maharashtra, Gujarat, Haryana, Madhya Pradesh, Punjab, Rajasthan	Bilaspur, Raipur, Nasik, Nagpur, Solapur, Sangli, Nanded, Jalgoan, Ahmednagar, Akola, Aurangabad, Dhule, Ahmedabad, Rajkot, Surat, Karnal, Indore, Bhopal, Jabalpur, Gwalior, Amritsar, Jalandhar, Chandigarh, Jodhpur, Jaipur, Udaipur, Bikaner, Ajmer, Kota	Hindi	Dainik Bhaskar Group	94.3	www.myfmindia.com	
radioBollyFM	Worldwide	Listen to your favourite Bollywood songs from old school to new live from India only on www.radiobollyfm.in	Hindi, English			www.radiobollyfm.in	yes
Radio Choklate	Odisha	Bhubaneswar			104	radiochoklate.com	
Radio City	Nationwide	Bengaluru, Ahmedabad, Mumbai, Jaipur, Delhi, Baroda, Surat, Sholapur, Nagpur, Sangli, Coimbatore, Visakhapatnam, Chennai, Pune, Hyderabad, Lucknow, Ahmednagar, Akola, Nanded, Jalgaon	Telugu, Kannada, Tamil, Hindi, English	Music Broadcast Limited, a subsidiary of Jagran Prakashan Limited	91.1	www.radiocity.in//	www.onlineradios.in/city// yes
Radio DC	Kerala	Thiruvananthapuram	Malayalam		90.4	radiodcfm.com	
Radio Dhamaal	Maharashtra	Ahmednagar			106.4	www.dhamaal24.com	
Radio Indigo	Karnataka Goa	Bengaluru	English	Jupiter Capital	91.9	www.indigo919.in	
Radio Macfast	Kerala	Tiruvalla	Malayalam, Malayalam language		90.4	RADIOMACFAST	yes
Radio Madhuban			Hindi, English		90.4	www.radiomadhuban.in	yes
Radio Mango	Kerala	Kozhikode, Kannur, Thrissur, Kochi		Malayala Manorama	91.9	www.radiomango.in	http://radiosindia.com/radiomango.html
Radio Media Village	Kerala	Kottayam			90.8		
Radio Mirchi	Nationwide	Bengaluru, Aurangabad, Maharashtra, Delhi, Mumbai, Kolkata, Jaipur, Pune, Indore, Ahmedabad, Chennai, Thiruvananthapuram and more cities	Kannada, Hindi, Malayalam, Telugu][Bengali	Entertainment Network India Limited, a subsidiary of The Times Group	98.3	www.radiomirchi.com	Yes
Radio Nasha	Maharashtra, Delhi	Mumbai, Delhi	Hindi		107.2		
Radio One	Delhi, Maharashtra, Tamil Nadu, Karnataka, Madhya Pradesh, West Bengal, Gujarat	Delhi, Pune, Mumbai, Chennai, Bengaluru, Indore, Kolkata, Ahmedabad	English (In Delhi & Bombay), Hindi (Others)	Next Mediaworks, a subsidiary of HT Media	94.3	www.radioone.in	yes
Radio Ooo La La	Tripura		Hindi		91.9		
Radio Tadka	Rajasthan	Jaipur, Udaipur, Kota	Hindi	Rajasthan Patrika Group	95		
Radio Tarang	Haryana	Hisar	Hindi		104		
Red FM	Nationwide	Visakhapatnam, Bengaluru, Gulbarga, Hyderabad, Warangal, Jaipur, Bhubaneshwar, Pune, Aurangabad, Maharashtra, Nashik, Nagpur, Tirupati, Lucknow, Bhopal, Baroda, Rajkot, Ahmedabad, Indore, Vijayawada, Varanasi, Gangtok, Siliguri, Guwahati, Shillong, Asansol, Jamshedpur, Rajahmundry, Kanpur, Mangalore, Mysuru, Allahabad, Jabalpur, Thiruvananthapuram, Kozhikode, Kochi, Thrissur, Kannur, Aizwal, Delhi, Mumbai, Kolkata	Hindi	SUN Group	93.5,	redfm.in	yes
Ishq FM	Delhi, West Bengal, Maharashtra	Delhi, Kolkata, Mumbai	Hindi	India Today Group	104.8	ishq.com	yes
Salsarani Malayalam	Kerala	Kozhikode, Kannur, Kasaragod, Malappuram	Malayalam, Kannada, Tamil, Hindi, Telugu			www.islamonweb.net	
Sharada Krishi Vahini 90.8 FM	Maharashtra	Baramati	Marathi	KVK, Baramati	90.8	https://www.radiosharada.in/	yes
Suryan FM	Tamil Nadu, Puducherry	Chennai, Coimbatore, Madurai, Tirunelveli, Tiruchirapalli, Thoothukudi, & Puducherry	Tamil	Sun TV Network Ltd	93.5	www.suryanfm.in	yes
Vishnu FM	Andhra Pradesh	Bhimavaram	Telugu		92.1		
Retro Bollywood		World Wide	Hindi			https://www.jawaradio.com/retro-hindi	Yes
City FM 92	NCR		Hindi	City FM Network Pvt Ltd.	92.0	cityfm92.com	yes
106.4 FM Radio Gold		Delhi, Mumbai, Indore, Kolkata, and Chennai		All India Radio	106.4		
89.6 FM Sikar	Rajasthan	Sikar	Hindi		89.6	www.fmsikar.com	No

== Dubai ==
Name	Language	Operator	Frequency	Website	Listen live
HUM 106.2	Hindi	Shamal Media Services	106.2	www.humfm.com	yes
CITY 1016	Hindi	ARN	101.6	www.city1016.ae	yes
Radio Spice 105.4 FM	Hindi		105.4		yes

== Qatar ==
Name	Language	Operator	Frequency	Website	Listen live
Radio Suno	Malayalam	Olive suno Radio Network	91.7	www.suno.qa	yes
Radio Olive	Hindi	Olive suno Radio Network	106.3	www.olive.qa	yes

== Mauritius ==
Name	Language	Operator	Frequency	Website	Listen live
Radio Plus Indiz	Hindi, Bhojpuri, Tamil, Telugu	Le Défi Media Group	Online	radioplus.defimedia.info/	yes
Best FM	Hindi, English, Creole	MBC	103.5 & 99.4 & 96.4	www.mbcradio.tv	yes
Top FM	Hindi, French, Creole		105.7 & 104.4 & 106.0	www.topfmradio.com	yes
Radio Mauritius	Hindi, Urdu	MBC	819	www.mbcradio.tv	yes
Taal FM	Hindi, Bhojpuri	MBC	94.9 & 94.0 & 95.6	www.mbcradio.tv	yes
Radio Plus	French, Hindi, Creole	Le Défi Media Group	88.6 & 87.7 & 98.9	www.radioplus.mu	yes
Music FM	Creole, Hindi, French, English	MBC	92.4 & 90.8 & 94.9	www.mbcradio.tv	yes

== New Zealand ==
Name	Language	Operator	Frequency	Website	Listen live
Aakashwani Bharat Bhavan	Hindi, Gujarati	Wellington Access Radio	106.1FM	https://www.accessradio.org.nz/aakashwani-bharat-bhavan.html	yes

== Switzerland ==
Name	Language	Operator	Frequency	Website	Listen live
Thaalam Tamil 1	Tamil	Thaalam Media Network	7A, 8C, 9B, 11C DAB+	https://www.thaalam.ch/	yes

== Trinidad and Tobago ==
Name	Language	Operator	Frequency	Website	Listen live
Radio Jaagriti	Hindi		102.7	www.jaagriti.com	yes
Heritage Radio	Hindi		101.7	www.heritageradiott.com	yes
Radio 90.5 FM	Hindi		90.5	www.radio90fm.com	yes

== Canada ==
Name	Language	Operator	Frequency	Website	Listen live
CINA Radio	Hindi		1650 AM	www.cinaradio.com/	yes

== United States ==
Name	Language	Operator	Frequency	Website	Listen live
92.7	Indian ( no such language )	92.7	92.7		
Virijallu	Telugu			www.virijallu.com/	
Easy96	Hindi	Easy96 Broadcasting	Easy96.com	www.easy96.com	
Mera Sangeet	Hindi	Mera Sangeet	merasangeet.com	www.merasangeet.com	
Radio Dhool	Tamil	Radio Dhool	Apps, iOS, Android, Alexa & Google Devices	http://www.radiodhool.com	

== See also ==
- List of Chinese-language radio stations
- List of Tamil-language radio stations
- List of Kannada-language radio stations
