= FM broadcasting in India =

Type of radio broadcasting in India

FM broadcasting in India began in 1977; growing popularity after 2001 when the privatisation of FM broadcasting began. AIR's FM LRS (Local Radio Station) was inaugurated on 1 July 2000 at 06:00 in Kodaikanal relaying Madurai programs in the frequency 100.5 MHz. 100.5 was so popular that LRS was upgraded to an FM Channel in just two months. The channel covered a radius of about 200 km (120 mi) due to its location at 2200 meters above MSL at Kodaikanal. KODAI FM is popularly known as it is the biggest individual FM channel in India, in both area coverage and listenership.

As of December 2018, there are more than 369 operational private radio stations in more than 101 cities and towns across India. The Government of India-owned All India Radio which has about 470 FM stations covering 92% of the area and 99.19% of the population of India. AIR originates programming in 23 languages and 179 dialects.

== History ==
FM broadcasting began on 23 July 1977 in Chennai, then Madras, and was expanded during the 1990s, nearly 50 years after FM broadcasting grew in the United States. India first experimented with private FM broadcasts in Goa and the large metropolitan areas of Delhi, Kolkata, Mumbai, and Chennai. These were followed by private stations in Bangalore, Hyderabad, Jaipur and Lucknow.

Until 1993, All India Radio, a government undertaking, was the only radio broadcaster in India. The government then decided to privatise the radio broadcasting sector. It sold airtime blocks on its FM channels in Indore, Hyderabad, Mumbai, Delhi, Kolkata, Vizag, and Goa to private operators, who developed their own program content. The Times Group operated its brand, Times FM, till June 1998. After that, the Indian Government decided not to renew contracts given to private operators. Instead, in 2000, the Indian Government announced the auction of 108 FM frequencies across India, opening up the FM broadcasting industry to private competition.

Radio City Bangalore, started on 3 July 2001, is India's first private FM radio station. It launched with presenters such as Vera, Rohit Barker, Seetal Iyer, Jonzie Kurian, Geeta Modgil, Suresh Venkat, and Chaitanya Hegde and Priya Ganapathy on the weekends. The Times Group rebranded its radio operations, establishing the Radio Mirchi brand. The first Radio Mirchi station began broadcasting on October 4, 2001, in Indore.

Indian policy states that the broadcasters are assessed a one-time entry fee (OTEF), for a license period of 10 years. Under the Indian accounting system, this amount is amortised over the 10-year period at 10% per annum. The annual license fee for private broadcasters is either 4% of revenue share or 10% of reserve price, whichever is higher.

India's earlier attempts to privatise its FM channels ran into rough weather when private players bid heavily and most could not meet their commitments to pay the government the amounts they owed.

== Content ==
Nationally, many of the current FM broadcasters, including the Times of India, Hindustan Times, Mid-Day, and BBC are established media institutions in India and are making a strong pitch for news on FM, which is currently limited to nationalized stations only. Private FM stations are allowed to rebroadcast news from All India Radio, as long as they do so without any changes or additions. The Supreme Court of India on 17 October 2013 issued a public interest litigation to the central government requesting that the rules should be changed to allow FM stations to broadcast news reports.

== Radio stations by location ==
=== National Capital Region ===
Name	Frequency	Language
Radio Jamia (see Jamia Millia Islamia)	90.4 MHz	Multilingual
RADIO 7	90.4 MHZ	Hindi
Delhi University Community Radio	90.4 MHz	Multilingual
Radio SD 90.8	90.8 MHz	Hindi
Radio City	91.1 MHz	Multilingual
Big FM	92.7 MHz	Multilingual
Red FM	93.5 MHz	Multilingual
MY Fm	94.3 MHz	Hindi
Radio One	94.3 MHz	Hindi English
Hit95 FM	95.0 MHz	Hindi
Apna Radio (Indian Institute of Mass Communication)	96.9 MHz	Multilingual
Radio Mirchi	98.3 MHz	Multilingual
AIR FM Gold	100.1 MHz	Multilingual
FM Rainbow Lucknow	100.7 MHz	Hindi
All India Radio JAIPUR	101.2 MHZ	Hindi
Amit Bharti	101.6 MHz	Hindi
AIR FM Rainbow	102.6 MHz	Hindi
AIR AlWAR	103.1 MHz	Hindi
Fever 104	104.0 MHz	Hindi
104.8 Ishq	104.8 MHz	Hindi
Gyan Vani	105.6 MHz	Hindi
Vividh Bharti (All India Radio)	105.4 MHz	Hindi
Radio Nasha	107.2 MHz	Hindi
Sawai Madhopur FM	101.5 MHz	Hindi
Noida FM	107.4 MHz	Hindi
Gurgaon Ki Awaz	107.8 MHz	Hindi

=== Kolkata, West Bengal ===
- Radio SRFTI (90.4 MHz, Available within a 10 km radius of the film institute)
- Radio JU (90.8 MHz, Available within a 5 km radius of the university, from 11:00 AM to 7:30 PM)
- Y FM NSHM (91.2 MHz, Available within a 10 km radius of the institute, from 9:00 AM to 6:00 PM)
- Friends FM (91.9 MHz) (Bengali, Hindi)
- Big FM (92.7 MHz) (Bengali, Hindi)
- Red FM (93.5 MHz) (Bengali, Hindi)
- Radio Nasha (94.3 MHz, formerly Radio One) (Bengali, Hindi)
- Radio Mirchi (98.3 MHz) (Bengali, Hindi)
- AIR FM Gold (100.1 MHz)
- Akashwani Kolkata (100.3 MHz) (Bengali)
- AIR FM Vividh Bharati (101.8 MHz)
- Fever 104 FM (104 MHz) (Bengali, Hindi)
- Ishq FM (104.8 MHz) (Bengali, Hindi)
- AIR FM Rainbow (107 MHz)

=== Asansol, West Bengal ===
- Big FM (92.7 MHz) (Bengali, Hindi)
- Red FM (93.5 MHz) (Bengali, Hindi)
- Radio Mirchi (95.0 MHz) (Bengali, Hindi)

=== Siliguri, West Bengal ===
- Radio Misty (94.3 MHz) (Bengali, Hindi)
- Red FM (93.5 MHz) (Bengali, Hindi)
- Radio Mirchi (98.3 MHz) (Bengali, Hindi)

=== Bolpur Santiniketan, West Bengal ===
- Akashwani Santiniketan (103.1 MHz) (Bengali, Hindi)

=== Suri, West Bengal ===
- Gitanjali Radio (90.4 MHz Cultural radio station opened in 2024) (Bengali)

=== Kanpur, Uttar Pradesh ===
- IIT Kanpur Radio (90.4 MHz)
- Waqt Ki Awaz (91.2 MHz)
- Big FM (92.7&nb
sp;MHz)
- Red FM (93.5 MHz)
- Fever 104 FM (95.0 MHz)
- Radio Mirchi (98.3 MHz)
- AIR FM Rainbow (102.2 MHz)
- Vividh Bharati (103.7 MHz)
- Mirchi Love (91.9 MHz)
- News Channel English (105.6 MHz)
- Radio City (104.8 MHz)
- Gyan Vani (106.4 MHz)
- AIR FM Gold (736 MW)

=== Ayodhya, Uttar Pradesh ===
- AIR Ayodhya Radio (101.4 MHz)
- Awadhi Radio (98.2 MHz)
- Big FM (92.7 MHz)
- Red FM (93.5 MHz)
- Fever 104 FM (95.0 MHz)
- Radio Ayodhya (102.9 MHz)
- Vividh Bharati (103.7 MHz)
- Awadh University Radio (96.9 MHz)
- NAG FM (106.4 MHz)

=== Rajasthan ===
- Radio City (91.1 MHz)
- Red FM (93.5 MHz)
- (94.3 MHz)
- Tadka (95.0 MHz)
- Radio Mirchi (98.3 MHz)
- Radio Selfie (90.8 MHz)
- All India Radio (100.3 MHz)
- All India Radio(Jaipur) (101.2 MHz)
- Mirchi Love (104.0 MHz)
- 89.6 FM Sikar (89.6 MHz)

=== Ahmedabad, Gujarat ===
- Radio Mirchi - 98.3 FM (Times Group)
- My FM - 94.3 FM D B Corp Ltd.
- Red FM - 93.5 FM (Sun Group
- Radio City - 91.1 FM (Music Broadcast Limited)
- Radio One - 95.0 FM (Only Bollywood Retro Station of Ahmedabad)
- AIR Vividh Bharati - 96.7 FM (All India Radio)
- Micavaani - 90.4 FM (Mudra Institute of Communications)
- AIR Gyan Vaani - 105.4 FM (All India Radio)
- Mirchi Love - 104 FM (Times Group)
- All India radio - 100.1 FM
- Radio Nazariya - 107.8 FM (Drishti)
- Big Fm - 92.7

=== Hyderabad ===
Name	Frequency (MHz)	Language
Bol 90.4 FM	90.4	Multilingual
Radio City	91.1	Telugu
Big 92.7 FM	92.7	Telugu/Hindi
Red FM	93.5	Telugu
Fever Fm	94.3	Hindi
Mirchi 95	95	Hindi
Radio Mirchi	98.3	Telugu
All India Radio (AIR / AIR / Twin Cities FM Rainbow)	101.9	Telugu
All India Radio (AIR / AIR / Vvd Bharti)	102.8	Hindi
Kool 104	104	English
Gyan Vani	105.6	Hindi
Magic Fm	106.4	Telugu
Radio Charminar	107.8	Telugu/Hindi
Deccan Radio	107.8	Hindi

=== Mumbai, Maharashtra ===
- Bansal FM 95.5
- Vividh Bharati
- Jago Mumbai 90.8
- Radio City 91.1 FM
- Big FM 92.7
- Red FM 93.5
- Radio One 94.3 (Only English Radio station of Mumbai)
- Radio Mirchi 98.3 FM
- Radio Dhamaal 106.4
- AIR FM Gold 100.7
- RAINBOW FM 102.2
- Fever 104 FM 104.0
- Oye 104.8 104.8
- AIR FM Rainbow 107.1
- Mumbai One
- Magic FM 106.4
- Gyan Vani
- Radio MUST
- Radio Nasha 91.9

=== Bengaluru, Karnataka ===
- Radio City 91.1 FM - Kannada
- Indigo 91.9 FM FM - (English, Devotional)
- Big 92.7 FM - Kannada
- Red FM 93.5 FM - Hindi
- Radio ONE FM 94.3 - English
- Radio Mirchi 95 FM - Hindi
- Radio Mirchi 98.3 FM Kannada
- Ragam 100.1 FM (Classical)
- FM Rainbow 101.3 FM (Kannada, Hindi, English)
- Vividh Bharti 102.9 FM (Kannada, Hindi)
- Fever FM 104 FM (Hindi)
- Radio Active Community Radio 106.4 FM (Kannada, English, Hindi)

=== Tamil Nadu ===
All India Radio's FM ( Frequency Modulation) services in Tamil Nadu :

Android based AIR's Listen Live App Link

Sl.no	Station	Frequency (MHz)	Broadcasting since	Transmitted power	Transmitter coordinates	Website	Listen Live
1	Chennai	101.4 AIR FM Rainbow, 100.1 AIR FM Gold, 102.3 Vividh Bharathi	1977	20 kW, Stereo	13N_80E	AIR	Link
2	Tiruchirapalli	102.1 AIR FM Rainbow	10 January 2001	10 kW, Stereo	10N_78E	AIR	Link
3	Coimbatore	103.0 AIR FM Rainbow	Aug 2000	10 kW, Stereo	10N_77E	AIR	Link
4	Madurai	103.3 AIR FM Rainbow	Aug 2005	10 kW, Stereo	9N_78E	AIR	Link
5	Kodaikanal	100.5 AIR FM Rainbow	1 July 2000	10 kW, Stereo	10N_77E	AIR	Link
6	Tirunelveli	102.6 AIR FM Rainbow		10 kW	8N_77E	AIR	Link
7	Salem (Yercaud transmitter)	103.7 Dharmapuri FM Rainbow relay		100 W	11N_78E	AIR	Link
8	Nagercoil	101 (LRS)		10 kW	8N_77E	AIR	Link
9	Thanjavur	101.2 (Relay)	Dec 2010	100 W		AIR	Link
10	Kumbakonam	101.60 (Relay)		10 kW	10N_79E	AIR	Link
11	Dharmapuri	102.5 (LRS)		10 kW	12N_78E	AIR	Link
12	Karaikal	100.3		10 KW	10N_79E	AIR	Link
13	Tirupattur, Vellore	100.1 (Relay), 100.4		100 W	12N_79E	AIR	Link
14	Rameshwaram	100.9 (Relay of AIR Madurai FM), from Rameswaram TV Tower, 100.1		20 KW, 100 W	9N_79E	AIR	Link
15	Ooty (Udagamandalam)	101.8	Dec 2010	10 kW	11N_76E	AIR	Link
16	Thoothukudi (Tuticorin)	100.1		1 KW	8N_78E	AIR	Link

Commercial Private Broadcasters: List of Tamil Nadu Commercial Private FM Radio Stations :

Sl.No	Station name	Frequency (MHz) / Location	Owned by	Website
1	Suryan FM (since 2003)	93.5 MHz (Chennai, Coimbatore, Madurai, Tiruchirappalli, Tirunelveli, Thoothukudi); 93.9 MHz (Salem, Vellore, Pondicherry); 91.9 MHz (Erode)	Sun Group	SuryanFM.in
2	Hello FM (since 2006)	106.4 MHz (Chennai, Coimbatore, Madurai, Tiruchirappalli, Tirunelveli, Thoothukudi, Puducherry); 91.5 MHz (Salem, Vellore); 92.7 MHz (Erode)	Malar Publications (Dina Thanthi / S. P. Adithanar)	Hello FM
3	Radio Mirchi (since 2006)	98.3 MHz (Chennai, Coimbatore, Madurai); 95.0 MHz (Tiruchirappalli, Tirunelveli)	Entertainment Network India Limited	mirchi.in
4	Radio City (since 2006)	91.1 MHz (Chennai, Coimbatore); 91.9 MHz (Madurai)	Music Broadcast Limited of Jagran Prakashan	RadioCity.in
5	Big FM (since 2006)	92.7 MHz (Chennai, Puducherry)	Reliance Broadcast Network Limited	BigFMindia.com
6	Fever FM (since 2006)	91.9 MHz (Chennai)	HT Media	Fever FM
7	Chennai Live (since 2007)	104.8 MHz (Chennai)	M.O.P. Vaishnav College for Women	ChennaiLive.FM

- Anna FM 90.4 Tamil

=== Kerala state ===
- Radio Mattoli FM 90.4, Wayanad
- Radio DC FM 90.4, Thiruvananthapuram
- Radio Macfast FM 90.4, Thiruvalla
- AIR Real FM 103.6 in Kozhikode
- Radio Mirchi 104.00 in Kochi
- Radio Mango 91.9, in Kochi, Thrissur, Kozhikode & Kannur & 92.7 in Alappuzha
- Red FM 93.5 in Thiruvananthapuram, Kochi, Kozhikode & Kannur & Red FM 95 in Thrissur
- Club FM 94.3 in Thiruvananthapuram, Kochi & Kannur & Club FM 104.8 in Alappuzha, Thrissur & Kozhikode
- Radio Mirchi 98.3 in Thiruvananthapuram,
- BIG FM 92.7 in Thiruvananthapuram
- AIR FM Rainbow 107.5 in Kochi
- AIR Ananthapuri FM 101.9 in Thiruvananthapuram,
- AIR Thiruvananthapuram 106.5
- AIR Thrissur 101.1
- AIR Kochi FM 102.3
- AIR Kannur 101.5
- AIR Devikulam 101.4
- AIR Manjeri FM 102.7
- AIR Gyan Vani-Kochi 106.5
- Radio Media Village Changanacherry FM 90.8
- Global Radio 91.2 FM Alappuzha
- Radio Neythal 107.8 FM Alappuzha

== Market view, Jaipur ==
Traditionally, radio accounts for 7% to 8% of advertiser expenditures around the world. In India, it is less than 2% at present.

The ministry of broadcasting in India is setting up more (86) FM Radio to all parts of India by March 2017.

List of FM Stations in Jaipur:

1. 91.1 Radio City (Listenership; 16 lacs plus)
2. 94.3 MY FM (Listenership; 15 lacs plus)
3. 98.3 Radio Mirchi (Listenership; 12 lacs plus)
4. 104 Mirchi Love (Listenership; 10 lacs plus)
5. 93.5 Red FM (Listenership; 8.6 lacs plus)
6. 95 Tadka (Listenership; 1.4 lacs plus)

== Current allocation process ==
In FM Phase II — the latest round of the long-delayed opening up of private FM in India — some 338 frequencies were offered of which about 237 were sold.
