= List of radio stations in Mumbai =

There are seventeen radio stations in Mumbai, twelve of which broadcast in the frequency modulation (FM) band. Three of these are broadcast by All India Radio (AIR) . Thane, Bhiwandi, Kalyan, Navi Mumbai is also covered by these stations. Three stations, all run by AIR, broadcast on the amplitude modulation (AM) medium wave (MW) band. One broadcasts on the AM short wave (SW) band, which is also an AIR station. There are also a few internet-based radio shows starting up in the city. These include Tiffin Talk, a show that describes itself as "a new radio project in Mumbai with the simple goal of delivering relevant discussion." It is a weekly show focusing on political, business, and cultural issues that distributes as a podcast. There is also TD Radio, a show created by Teen Diaries LLC, that focuses on teen issues in the city. It airs live via webcast. One of them is Hasya Katta Official an internet-based radio station by Smit Shetye which airs live via webcast. Its broadcast covers Thane, Mumbai.

== AM ==
=== Mediumwave ===
Name	Frequency (kHz)
Mumbai A (Samvaadita Vaahini)	1044 kHz Currently a DRM channel which relays FM Rainbow Mumbai
Mumbai B (Asmita Vahini)	558 khz
Mumbai C (Vividh Bharati)	Not available on AM anymore, it is On FM 102.8 Mhz

=== ShortWave (SW) ===
Time	Frequency (kHz) Mumbai (Marathi Programme as per following time-table)
Between 5.25 A.M. and 9.30 A.M.	4840 kHz
Between 11.00 A.M. and 4.05 P.M.	7240 kHz
Between 6.00 P.M. and 11.00 P.M.	4840 kHz

== FM ==
No.	Frequency (MHz)	Stations			
1	91.1	Radio City			
2	92.7	BIG FM			
3	93.5	Red FM			
4	98.3	Radio Mirchi	5	100.1	AIR FM Gold
6	102.8	AIR Vividh Bharati	7	104.0	Fever 104 FM
8	104.8	Ishq FM			
9	107.1	AIR FM Rainbow			

== Internet Radio ==
No.	Frequency (MHz)	Stations
1	Online / Internet / Web	Hasya Katta Official
