= List of Tamil-language radio stations =

Radio stations that broadcast in the Tamil language are found primarily in India, Sri Lanka, Malaysia, Singapore, United Kingdom, United States, South Africa, Canada as well as other parts of the world containing a significant Tamil diaspora population.

== India ==
All India Radio's FM ( Frequency Modulation) services in Tamil Nadu :

Android based AIR's Listen Live App Link

Sl.no	Station	Frequency (MHz)	Broadcasting since	Transmitted power	Transmitter coordinates	Website	Listen Live
1	Chennai	101.4 AIR FM Rainbow, 100.1 AIR FM Gold, 102.3 Vividh Bharathi	1977	20 kW, Stereo	13N_80E	AIR	Link
2	Tiruchirapalli	102.1 AIR FM Rainbow	10 January 2001	10 kW, Stereo	10N_78E	AIR	Link
3	Coimbatore	103.0 AIR FM Rainbow	Aug 2000	10 kW, Stereo	10N_77E	AIR	Link
4	Madurai	103.3 AIR FM Rainbow	Aug 2005	10 kW, Stereo	9N_78E	AIR	Link
5	Kodaikanal	100.5 AIR FM Rainbow	1 July 2000	10 kW, Stereo	10N_77E	AIR	Link
6	Tirunelveli	102.6 AIR FM Rainbow		10 kW	8N_77E	AIR	Link
7	Salem (Yercaud transmitter)	103.7 Dharmapuri FM Rainbow relay		100 W	11N_78E	AIR	Link
8	Nagercoil	101 (LRS)		10 kW	8N_77E	AIR	Link
9	Thanjavur	101.2 (Relay)	Dec 2010	100 W		AIR	Link
10	Kumbakonam	101.60 (Relay)		10 kW	10N_79E	AIR	Link
11	Dharmapuri	102.5 (LRS)		10 kW	12N_78E	AIR	Link
12	Karaikal	100.3		10 KW	10N_79E	AIR	Link
13	Tirupattur, Vellore	100.1 (Relay), 100.4		100 W	12N_79E	AIR	Link
14	Rameshwaram	100.9 (Relay of AIR Madurai FM), from Rameswaram TV Tower, 100.1		20 KW, 100 W	9N_79E	AIR	Link
15	Ooty (Udagamandalam)	101.8	Dec 2010	10 kW	11N_76E	AIR	Link
16	Thoothukudi (Tuticorin)	100.1		1 KW	8N_78E	AIR	Link

All India Radio (AIR)'s Medium Wave AM Radio Broadcasting services in Tamil Nadu:
(table sorted in the order of oldest radio station first)

Android based AIR's Listen Live App Link

Sl.no.	Station	Frequency (kHz)	Broadcasting since	Transmitted power	Transmitter coordinates	Website	Listen Live
1	Chennai - A	720	16 June 1938	200 kW	13N_80E	AIR	Link
2	Tiruchirapalli	936	16 May 1939	100 kW	10N_78E	AIR	Link
3	Chennai (Vividh Bharti)	783	1957	20 kW	13N_80E	AIR	Link
4	Tirunelveli	1197	1 December 1963	20 kW	8N_77E	AIR	Link
5	Puducherry	1215	23 September 1967	20 kW	11N_79E	AIR	Link
6	Coimbatore	999	18 December 1968	20 kW	10N_77E	AIR	Link
7	Madurai	1269	6 June 1987	20 kW	9N_78E	AIR	Link
8	Thoothukudi (Tuticorin-External Service)	1053	31 May 1994	200 kW	8N_78E	AIR	Link

=== Private FM Broadcasters ===
List of Tamil Nadu Commercial Private FM Radio Stations :

Sl.No	Station name	Frequency (MHz) / Location	Owned by	Website
1	Suryan FM (since 2003)	93.5 MHz (Chennai, Coimbatore, Madurai, Tiruchirappalli, Tirunelveli, Thoothukudi); 93.9 MHz (Salem, Vellore, Pondicherry); 91.9 MHz (Erode)	Sun Group	SuryanFM.in
2	Hello FM (since 2006)	106.4 MHz (Chennai, Coimbatore, Madurai, Tiruchirappalli, Tirunelveli, Thoothukudi, Puducherry); 91.5 MHz (Salem, Vellore); 92.7 MHz (Erode)	Malar Publications (Dina Thanthi / S. P. Adithanar)	Hello FM
3	Radio Mirchi (since 2006)	98.3 MHz (Chennai, Coimbatore, Madurai); 95.0 MHz (Tiruchirappalli, Tirunelveli)	Entertainment Network India Limited	mirchi.in
4	Radio City (since 2006)	91.1 MHz (Chennai, Coimbatore); 91.9 MHz (Madurai)	Music Broadcast Limited of Jagran Prakashan	RadioCity.in
5	Big FM (since 2006)	92.7 MHz (Chennai, Puducherry)	Reliance Broadcast Network Limited	BigFMindia.com
6	Fever FM (since 2006)	91.9 MHz (Chennai)	HT Media	Fever FM
7	Chennai Live (since 2007)	104.8 MHz (Chennai)	M.O.P. Vaishnav College for Women	ChennaiLive.FM

=== Puducherry (Union Territory of India) ===
Sl.no	Station name	Frequency (MHz/kHz) / Location	Band	Broadcasting since	Owned by
1	All India Radio (AIR) Puducherry	1215 kHz	MW (AM)	23 September 1967	Prasar Bharati
2	All India Radio (AIR) FM Rainbow	102.8 MHz	FM	1990s	Prasar Bharati
3	All India Radio (AIR) Karaikal	100.3 MHz	FM		Prasar Bharati
4	Suryan FM	93.5 MHz	FM	2008	Sun Group
5	Big FM	92.7 MHz	FM	2008	Reliance Broadcast Network
6	Radio Mirchi	104.0 MHz	FM	2008	Entertainment Network (India) Ltd.

=== All India Radio's Digital Radio Mondiale – DRM service ===
Currently DRM digital radio channels are in the production stage.

=== News on AIR service by All India Radio ===
The latest regional news bulletins in Tamil language can be heard in audio format.

The latest national news bulletins in Tamil language can be heard in audio format

The latest regional and national news are also in text format. This website is updated twice every day.

== Africa ==
- Lotus FM (Lotus FM – South Africa's Indian radio station – Tamil, Hindi, Telugu, Gujarati)

== Australia ==
Sl.no	Station Name	Station Name in Tamil	Frequency	Website
1	Australian Tamil Broadcasting Corporation (ATBC)	அவுஸ்திரேலிய தமிழ் ஒலிபரப்புகூட்டுத்தாபனம்	Online	Website Link
2	SBS Radio	அஸ்திரேலிய அரசாங்க வானொலி நிலையம்	Online	Website Link
3	Inbathamil Oli	இன்பத்தமிழ் ஒலி	Online	Website Link

== Canada ==
- EAST FM 102.7 (CJRK-FM) - Tamil FM Radio in Toronto ( A Multiculture Radio )
- CMR Tamil FM, Toronto, Ontario

== China ==
Sl.no	Station Name	Station Name in Tamil	Frequency	Website	Operating since
1	China Global Television Network (CGTN)	சீன தமிழ் வானொலி	Online and SW	Website Link	1964

== Pakistan ==
- Pakistan Broadcasting Corporation

== Malaysia ==
- Minnal FM
- Raaga (formerly THR - TIME Highway Radio)

== Singapore ==
- Oli 96.8 FM (Mediacorp formerly known as Singapore Broadcasting Corporation Radio).

== Sri Lanka ==
- Sri Lanka Broadcasting Corporation (இலங்கை ஒலிபரப்பு கூட்டுத்தாபனம்), previously Radio Ceylon, Ceylon Broadcasting Corporation
- FM99
- Shakthi FM
- Sooriyan FM
- Varnam FM

Radio station	Frequency	Primary language	Status
Shakthi FM	103.9 MHz, 104.1 MHz	Tamil	Active
SLBC – Tamil National Service	102.1 MHz, 102.3 MHz	Tamil	Active
SLBC – Tamil Commercial Service (Thendral)	104.7 MHz, 104.9 MHz	Tamil	Active
SLBC – Vidula Children's Service	107.3 MHz, 107.5 MHz	Sinhala, Tamil and English	Active
SLBC – Kothmale FM	97.6 MHz,	Sinhala, Tamil	Active
Sooriyan FM	103.4 MHz, 103.6 MHz	Tamil	Active
Varnam FM	90.4 MHz, 90.6 MHz	Tamil	Active

== UK ==
- BBC Tamil World Service - (தமிழோசை – பிபிசி உலக சேவை) from London

== Vatican City ==
- Radio Vaticana வத்திக்கான் வானொலி

== See also ==
- Broadcasting in Chennai
- Tamil Language Media
- List of Sri Lankan broadcasters
- List of Indian-language radio stations
- FM broadcasting in India
