= List of radio stations in New Delhi =

There are 16 radio stations in New Delhi of which 13 are broadcast in frequency modulation (FM) band. Of the 13 FM stations, 4 are broadcast by AIR. One station, run by AIR, broadcast on the amplitude modulation (AM) medium wave (MW) band.

== AM ==
=== Mediumwave ===
| Frequency (kHz) | Name |
|---|---|
| 819 | AIR Indraprastha |

== FM ==
| No. | Frequency (MHz) | Stations |
|---|---|---|
| 1 | 91.1 | Radio City |
| 2 | 92.7 | BIG FM |
| 3 | 93.5 | Red FM |
| 4 | 95.0 | Hit 95 FM |
| 5 | 98.3 | Radio Mirchi |
| 6 | 100.1 | AIR FM Gold |
| 7 | 102.6 | AIR FM Rainbow |
| 8 | 104.0 | Fever 104 FM |
| 9 | 104.8 | Ishq FM |
| 10 | 105.6 | Gyan Vani |
| 11 | 106.4 | Delhi Vividh Bharti |
| 12 | 107.2 | Punjabi Fever |

108.5 haraynvi 33
