= Broadcasting in Chennai =

Broadcasting in the city of Chennai began in 1924 by the Madras Presidency Radio Club. The service was operational till the government-run All India Radio started broadcasting in the city in 1938.

Currently, the city has 4 AM and 11 FM radio stations operated by All India Radio, Suryan FM, Radio Mirchi, BIG FM, Hello FM, Radio City, Radio One, Anna University among others.

== History ==
Broadcasting in India began in June 1923 during the British Raj with programmes by the Bombay Presidency Radio Club and other radio clubs. In 1924, the Madras Presidency Radio Club was established by V. Krishnaswamy Chetty. It made its first broadcast from Holloway’s Garden in Egmore on 31 July 1924. The Club later faced some financial difficulties but was rescued by the Madras Municipal Corporation in 1927, which ran it till All India Radio was established in Madras in 1938. The radio station at the Ripon Building complex was founded in 1930.

According to an agreement of 23 July 1927, the private Indian Broadcasting Company LTD (IBC) was authorised to operate two radio stations: the Bombay station began on 23 July 1927, and the Calcutta station followed on 26 August 1927. The company went into liquidation on 1 March 1930. The government took over the broadcasting facilities and began the Indian State Broadcasting Service (ISBS) on 1 April 1930 on an experimental basis for two years and permanently in May 1932. On 8 June 1936, the ISBS was renamed All India Radio.

All India Radio Madras began its operations on 16 June 1938. It became one of the six operational stations in the AIR network in the country when India gained independence in 1947, along with Delhi, Bombay, Calcutta, Lucknow, and Tiruchirappalli. The total number of radio sets at that time was about 275,000 in India. The Vividh Bharati Service was launched on 3 October 1957 to compete with Radio Ceylon. AIR Madras became the first station in the country to begin FM broadcasting on 23 July 1977, which was later expanded during the 1990s.

== Current Broadcasters ==
Sl.No	Band	Station / Service	Frequency	Broadcasting since	Transmitted power	Transmitter coordinates
1	FM	AIR FM Rainbow	101.4 MHz	1977	20 kW, Stereo	13.147665°N 80.127940°E
2	FM	AIR FM Gold	100.1 MHz	1977	20 kW, Stereo	13.147665°N 80.127940°E
3	FM	All India Radio Vividh Bharathi	102.3 MHz	1977	20 kW, Stereo	13.147665°N 80.127940°E
4	FM (Private)	Radio City	91.1 MHz	2006		
5	FM (Private)	Fever FM	91.9 MHz	2006		
6	FM (Private)	Big FM	92.7 MHz	2006		
7	FM (Private)	Suryan FM	93.5 MHz	2003		
8	FM (Private)	Radio Mirchi	98.3 MHz	2006		
9	FM (Private)	Hello FM	106.4 MHz	2006		
10	FM (Private)	Chennai Live	104.8 MHz	2007		
11	MW (AM)	All India Radio Chennai 'A'	720 kHz	16 June 1938	200 kW	13.147665°N 80.127940°E
12	MW (AM)	All India Radio Chennai 'C' (Vividh Bharti)	783 kHz	1957	20 kW	
13	MW (AM)	All India Radio Chennai 'B'	1017 kHz	14 October 1994	20 kW	

== See also ==
- List of Tamil-language radio stations
- Vividh Bharati
- AIR FM Rainbow
- Telecommunications in India
