= Media in Chennai =

The article speaks about the many print, television and radio networks that dominate Chennai city's mass media market.

== Print media ==
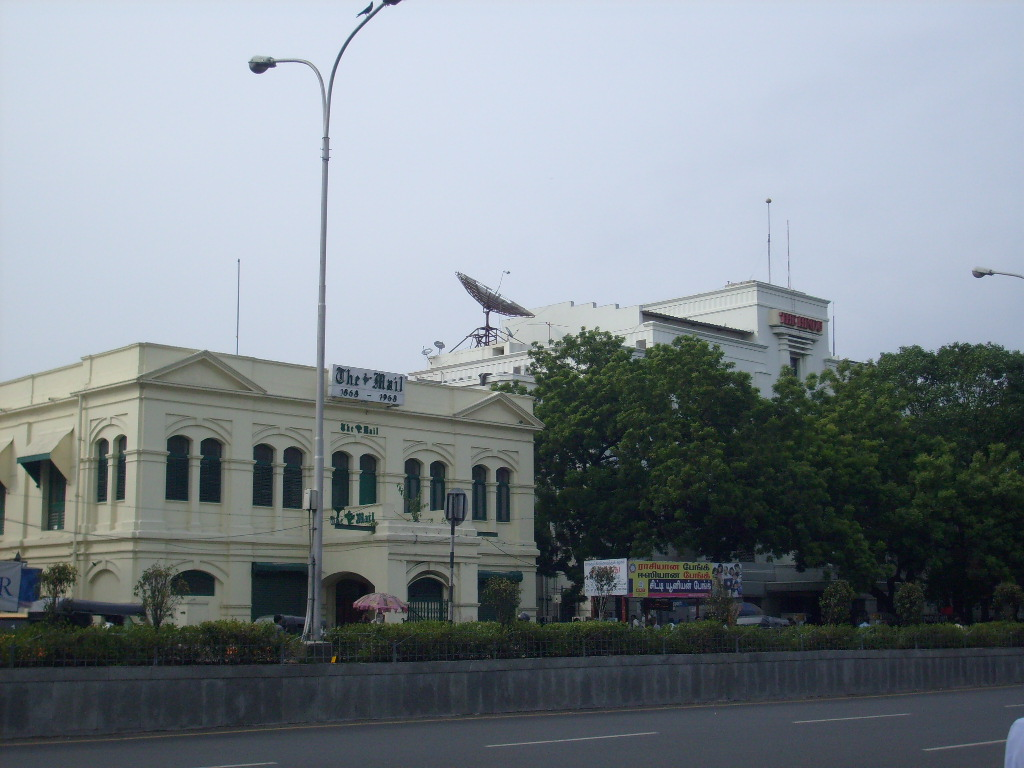
The offices of The Hindu and the now-defunct The Mail in Anna Salai

Newspaper publishing started in Chennai with the launch of a weekly, The Madras Courier, in 1785. It was followed by the weeklies Azdarar, the first Armenian language newspaper ever published, in 1794, and The Madras Gazette and The Government Gazette in 1795. The Spectator, founded in 1836, was the first English newspaper in Chennai to be owned by an Indian and became the city's first daily newspaper in 1853. The first Tamil newspaper, Swadesamitran, was launched in 1899. The first Telugu journal printed in Madras was Satya Doota in 1835.

Chennai has six major print media groups that publish about eight major newspapers and magazines. The major English dailies are The Hindu, The Times of India, The New Indian Express and The Deccan Chronicle evening dailies, The Trinity Mirror and News Today. As of 2012, The Hindu was the city's most read English newspaper, with a daily circulation of 5.4 lakh copies. The major business dailies published from the city are The Economic Times, The Hindu Business Line, Business Standard, and The Financial Express. The major Tamil dailies include the Dina Thanthi, Dinakaran, Dina Mani, Dina Malar, Tamizh Ossai, Tamil Murasu, Theekkathir, Makkal Kural and Malai Malar. Many local newspapers cater to particular localities and neighborhoods.

Magazines published from Chennai include Ananda Vikatan, Kumudam, Kalki, Nakkheeran, Kungumam, Swath (Telugu magazine), Frontline, and Sportstar.

== Television ==
Doordarshan runs three terrestrial television channels, DD CHENNAI (DD-1), DD NEWS (DD-2), and DD Podhigai, and one satellite television channel, Podhigai TV, from its Chennai centre, which was set up in 1974. Private Tamil satellite television networks like Sun TV, Zee Tamil, Raj TV, Star Vijay, Colors Tamil, Jaya TV, Makkal TV and Kalaignar TV Thamizhan TV broadcast out of Chennai.

The Sun Network, a Rs. 4,395 crore public firm, is based in the city and is the country's second-largest broadcasting company, in terms of viewership share. Some of its TV shows have generated the highest television rating points in the country. In addition to owning 19 TV channels in all major South Indian languages, the group owns FM radio stations in over eleven cities and some Tamil magazines and newspapers.

SCV is the major cable TV service provider. Direct-to-home (DTH) is available via DD Direct Plus, Dish TV, Tata Sky, Sun Direct DTH, BIG TV, Airtel Digital TV and Videocon d2h. Chennai is the first city in India to have implemented the Conditional Access System for cable television.

== Radio ==
Radio broadcasting started from the radio station at the Rippon Buildings complex, founded in 1930, and was shifted to All India Radio in 1938. The city has two AM and ten FM radio stations, operated by Anna University, All India Radio and private broadcasters.

No.	Radio Station name	Frequency
1.	All India Radio Chennai (AIR Chennai) Akashvani Chennai 720 kHz	783 kHz, 1017 kHz, 4920 kHz, 7160 kHz 101.4 MHz, 102.3 MHz
2.	Anna FM (Anna University, Chennai)	90.4 MHz
3.	Loyola FM (Loyola College, Chennai)	90.8 MHz
4.	Radio City	91.1 MHz
5.	M.O.P. FM (Mop Vaishnav College, Chennai)	107.8 MHz
6.	Aahaa FM	91.9 MHz
7.	Big 92.7 FM (Big 92.7, Chennai)	92.7 MHz
8.	Suryan FM (Suryan FM, SunTV Network)	93.5 MHz
9.	Radio One FM	94.3 MHz
10.	Radio Mirchi	98.3 MHz
11.	Rainbow FM	101.4 MHz
12.	Gold FM	102.3 MHz
13.	Gyan Vani FM	104.2 MHz
14.	Chennai Live 104.8 FM, Muthoot Group	104.8 MHz
15.	Hello FM, Malar Publications	106.4 MHz
16.	Ezhisai FM, Ezhisai	www.ezhsaifm.com

== Web media ==
- IPD Tamil 24×7: the Tamil daily digital news portal publishing in Chennai and some more places in Tamil Nadu since 2020. Contains the latest news, breakings, political, sports, spiritual, crime and more.
- BehindWoods: an English-language film and television news and review website founded in 2003, based in Chennai. It even has a unit in Kerala named Behindwoods Ice. Behindwoods Gold Medal is an event held annually since the mid 2010s. In 2024, BehindWoods began production on its first feature film Moonwalk, directed by its founder and CEO Manoj NS.

Former

- Cinesouth: a multilingual film news and review website. It is one of the earliest such websites dedicated to South Indian cinema.

== Kollywood ==
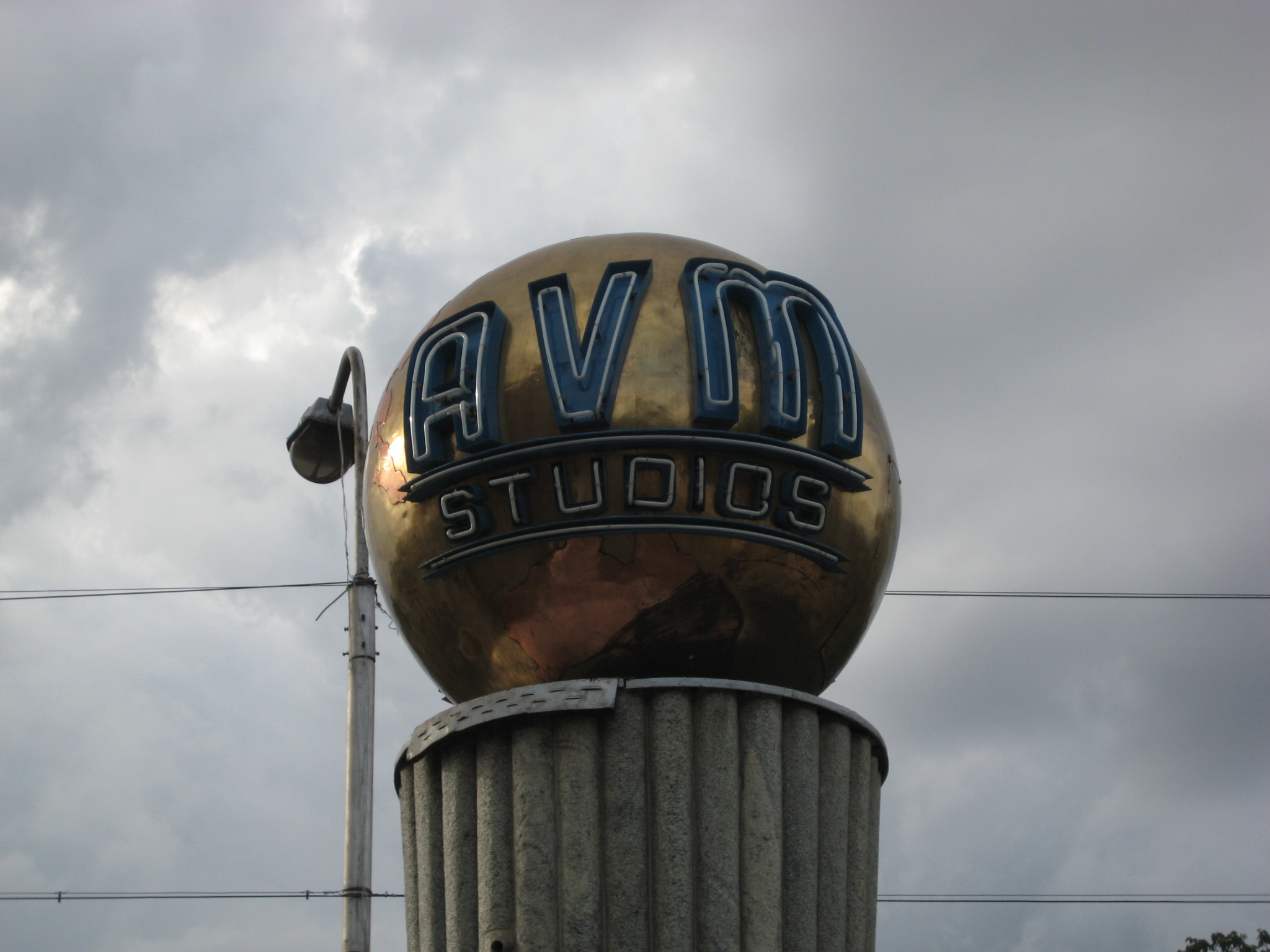
AVM Studios

The Tamil Film Industry, based in Kodambakkam and Vadapalani area of Chennai, is the second most popular branch of Indian cinema. The word Kollywood is a portmanteau of Kodambakkam and Hollywood. The AVM Studios located in this area is the oldest surviving studio in India.

== See also ==
- List of Tamil language television channels
- List of Tamil-language radio stations
