= AIR National =

India
- Broadcast area: India
- Frequency: 1566 kHz

Programming
- Languages: Hindi & English
- Format: Music & News Radio

Ownership
- Owner: All India Radio
- Operator: AIR Nagpur & AIR Delhi
- Sister stations: Vividh Bharati; AIR FM Gold; AIR FM Rainbow; Raagam

History
- First air date: 1988/05/18
- Last air date: 2019/01/03

Technical information
- Power: 500 kW
- HAAT: 191.6 M

Links
- Website: http://allindiaradio.gov.in

AIR National was an Indian radio station. It was run by All India Radio. Programming is mainly in Hindi and English languages. These programmes emphasize entertainment, music and news. The channel is designed to represent India's cultural mosaic and ethos.

The programmes of National Channel are broadcast by a one megawatt transmitter from Nagpur, Kolkata, Delhi, Bangalore, and Aligarh.
