= Rameswaram TV Tower =

Television broadcasting tower in Rameswaram, Tamil Nadu, India

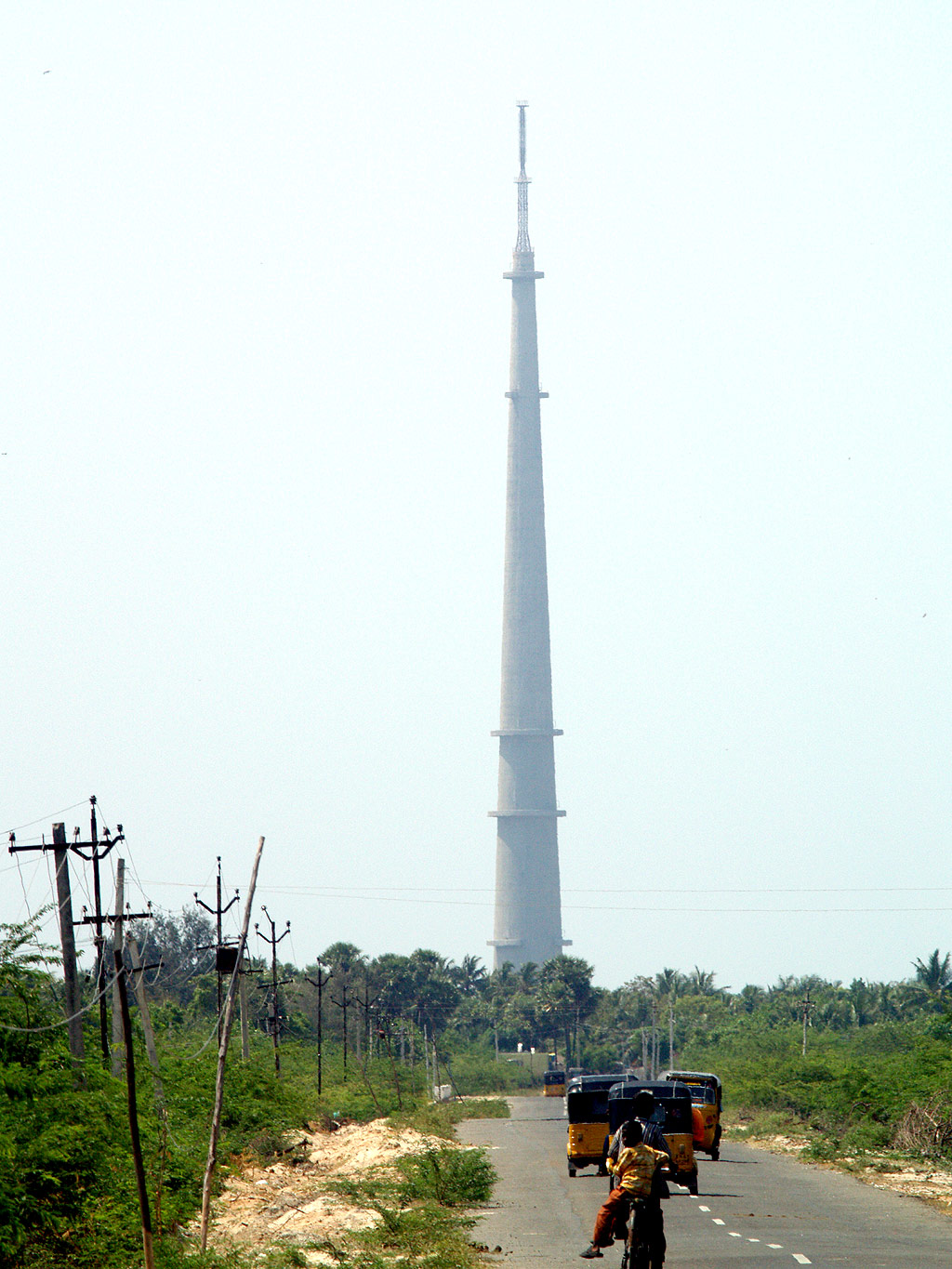
- Rameswaram TV Tower
- Interactive map of the Rameswaram TV Tower area

General information
- Type: TV Broadcast
- Location: Rameswaram, Tamil Nadu, India
- Coordinates: 9°17′33.5″N 79°18′32.7″E
- Completed: 1995

Height
- Antenna spire: 323 m (1,059.7 ft)

The Rameswaram TV Tower is a free-standing tower that was built in 1995. Standing at 323 metres (1,060 ft), it is the second tallest structure in India. The tower was used by Doordarshan for television broadcasting until it was phased out on 2022. It is currently used to relay Akashvani Madurai's FM Rainbow programmes in 100.9 MHz. The main structure is made of reinforced cement concrete and the mast is made of lattice steel.

== Geography ==
The Rameswaram TV Tower is situated in the town of Rameswaram, which is a small municipality in the Ramanathapuram district, an administrative district in the South Indian state of Tamil Nadu.

== See also ==
- List of Tamil-language radio stations
- Broadcasting in Chennai
- Tamil Language Media
- List of Sri Lankan broadcasters
- List of Indian-language radio stations
- FM broadcasting in India
