= Vineet Singh Hukmani =

Indian singer

- Origin: Noida, India
- Genres: Pop; Rock; Hip hop; Electronic
- Occupations: Singer; Songwriter; Music producer; Entrepreneur
- Years active: 2020–present
- Website: www.vineet.today

Vineet Singh Hukmani is an Indian singer and music media entrepreneur. He is the co-founder and former CEO of Radio One and stepped down from his role in 2019. Vineet Singh Hukmani is credited with creating the 'World's First Music Multiverse' that uses his song 'Run Run Run' to create a superhero 3D animation short film called 'Run Run Run-Storm' and a superhero comic book series titled Run Storm and the Hope Star' as reported in The Hindu and the Times of India.

Vineet released "Jab The World" on World Vaccination Day (March 16), and it entered the mainstream top 100 charts. He was reported to be the first Asian / Indian to reach No:1 on the DRT ( Digital Radio Tracker/Cash Box Magazine) Top 150 radio charts, by The Hindustan Times on Aug 21, 2022 & The Times of India on Aug 22, 2022.

== Early life and career ==
Vineet Singh Hukmani studied electronics engineering in Bangalore and also studied at Harvard Business School. He co-founded Radio One and stayed with the organisation for 12 years. Times of India reported Vineet to be certified as the first artist in the world in 2021 to have 9 number 1 singles on the European Indie Top 100 chart.

== Discography ==
S. No	Title	Year	Chart Ranking
1	Twenty Twenty	2020	
2	Can't Wait	2020	
3	Mask	2020	
4	Dreaming Out Loud	2021	Euro Indie Music Chart
5	Jab The World	2021	DRT Pop Chart
6	So New	2021	DRT Pop Chart
7	I Pray	2021	Euro Indiie Music Chart

== Reception ==
SB Vijaya Mary, in The Hindu, said "Vineet Singh Hukmani believes that music has untapped potential in the immersive space. A year after he released a multimedia book Nine that showcases nine stories combined with nine tracks, he dropped the world’s first music multiverse on May 9, 2023".

Suruchi Kapur - Gomes from the Times of India, Bangalore times bureau, reported : "Singer and songwriter Vineet Singh Hukmani released the world’s first musical multiverse, Run Storm and the Hope Star, in a triad: a song, a superhero comic book with a Q R code, and a 3D film"

Neha Vashist from the Times of India network, reported : "Recently, he became the first Indian to have the most-played independent song on over 10000 USA radio stations. Also, his song ‘Dee Da Da Da’ was number 1 on the DRT Independent 150"

Samarth Goyal from The Hindustan Times reported : "After a world record, multiple Grammy submissions and a unique concept of a book-meets-album, Delhi-based independent artist Vineet Singh Hukmani has now become the first Asian/Indian artist to have the most played independent song on over 10000 USA radio stations, with his latest single Dee Da Da Da, rising to the number one spot on the DRT Independent 150 and the Number 56 spot on the Mainstream Top 200 pop songs in the USA."

Fathima Ashraf from the Times of India network, reviewed his first book, 'Nine', which has a music album embedded in it, calling it a ‘one-of-a-kind, immersive experience’

Times of India reported him, being the first artist in the world to achieve 9 number 1 singles on the European Top 100 charts. "Vineet, who recently became first artist in the world to have 9 number 1 singles on the European Top 100 charts in 2021, has come with singles serving a dollop of versatility in terms of genre" .

Sugandha Rawal from Hindustan times reported that his music was submitted in consideration for a Grammy. "Hukmani has three of his singles — Jab the World in Rock, I Pray in Melodic Rap and Turning Back Time in Pop — submitted for 2022 Grammy consideration in mainstream categories."

Euro Indie Music announced his winning a gold disc and world record in 2022. "Vineet – a.k.a. Vineet Singh Hukmani, from India, was awarded a prestigious gold disc and plaque by the European Indie Music Commission and the MEI Indipendenti for his world record breaking feat of being the ‘first artist in the world’ to hold NINE NUMBER 1 positions on the European Indie Top 100 chart in 2021. The Plaque was awarded to him on Jan 11, 2022."

Vijayalakshmi Narayanan from Radio City wrote about his work, "Vineet imbues a fresh burst of energy through his latest track, ‘So New’. ‘So New’ comes across as a shot in the arm, but unlike ‘Jab The World’, it infuses a new wave of positivity. It reinstates that it takes the simplest and smallest things to bounce back from adverse situations."

Mindy McCall from Indie Pulse Music wrote, "There is a little disconnect between the song’s subject matter and footage, but it isn’t enough to undermine either. It is notable that he focuses much of the video’s attention on medical professionals and links up well with the opening tribute he pays to the nurses and scientists. His vocals are especially potent. The way he attacks the lyric makes the words sound like a call to arms and his muscular phrasing immeasurably enhances the words."

The Score Magazine also said, "It would be easy to draw comparisons with other singers but that would be lazy and disingenuous to Vineet whose voice hides little in the way of emotion but it is not mawkish. His voice oozes empathy, not sympathy."

Los Angeles magazine review by critic Michael Rand said "I Pray has universal resonance any discerning listener will hear. It gains added momentum from the emotional impact Vineet delivers with every line. Contrasted with his earlier single “Jab the World” and its high-powered rock vocals, he sings like a virtuosic angel during this track.’"

Indie shark magazine wrote for the same track, "This is a single that seems tailor-made for making a global impact and benefits from Vineet pouring every ounce of soul into its final result. Its universality and melodic merits set it apart as well. The finishing measure, however, is always Vineet’s presence in the song – it is a riveting vocal performance you cannot turn away from."
