= Media in Coimbatore =

Coimbatore (Tamil: கோயம்புத்தூர்; [koaɪmbaːʈoɾi]), also known as Kovai (Tamil: கோவை; pronounced [koʋaːaɪ]), is the second largest city in the Indian state of Tamil Nadu with a metropolitan population of over 2 million. It is a major commercial centre and has often been referred to as the "Manchester of South India".

== Television ==
Lotus News 24\7 Tamil news channel is headquartered in Coimbatore.

== Print media ==
Tamil newspapers which have Coimbatore editions include Dina Malar, Dina Thanthi, Dina Mani, Dinakaran, The Hindu (Tamil) (all morning newspapers) and Tamil Murasu and Malai Malar (both evening newspapers).

Two Malayalam newspapers, Malayala Manorama and Mathrubhumi, also have considerable circulation in the city.

Four major English newspapers, The Hindu, The Times of India, Deccan Chronicle and The New Indian Express put out editions from the city. Business newspapers Business Line, Business Standard and The Financial Express also put out a Coimbatore edition.

Neighbourhood newspapers such as The Pellamedu Times and The Redfields Times cater to particular localities.

== Radio communication ==
A medium wave radio station is operated by All India Radio, with most programs in Tamil, English and Hindi. Five FM radio stations operate from Coimbatore - Rainbow FM from All India Radio, Suryan FM from Sun Network, Radio Mirchi, Radio City, and Hello FM. All these private radio stations air exclusively Tamil based programs, including film music. The range of these stations cover Coimbatore, Tirupur, Erode and Nilgiri districts of Tamil Nadu, and Palakkad and Wayanad districts of Kerala. Television relay started in 1985 from Delhi Doordarshan. In 1986, after inception of a repeater tower at Kodaikanal, telecast from Madras Doordarshan commenced. The people of Coimbatore witnessed the 1980 Olympics and 1983 Cricket World Cup on a giant screen in VOC Park when the city-based UMS developed a dish antenna for satellite signal reception. Currently television reception is through DTH or by cable, while Doordarshan reception is still available using an external antenna. In 2005, Doordarshan opened its studio in Coimbatore.

Coimbatore has a well connected communications infrastructure. Until the 1990s the state owned Bharat Sanchar Nigam Limited (BSNL) was the only telecommunication service provider in the city. In the 1990s, private telecom companies also started offering their services. Currently besides BSNL, fixed line telephone services are offered by Reliance Communications and Bharti Airtel. Dial up internet connections were first introduced (by HCL and BPL) in 1996 and broadband internet (by BSNL) in 2005. As of 2010, BSNL, Reliance Communications, Bharti Airtel, Tata Teleservices all offer broadband service through fixed lines and mobiles;MTS offers mobile broadband alone. Cellular telephony was first introduced in 1997. Coimbatore is the headquarters of the Tamil Nadu circle of cellular service providers. The telecom company Aircel is headquartered in the city. Mobile telephone services available in the city include both CDMA and GSM connections.

== Films ==
Coimbatore is home to some of the oldest film studios in South India. Swamikannu Vincent, a film exhibitor, set up the first movie studios in the city. Rangaswamy Naidu established the Central Studios in 1935 while S. M. Sriramulu Naidu set up the Pakshiraja Studios in 1945.
