= Hello FM =

Radio station in Tamil Nadu and Puducherry

Hello FM (106.4, 94.5, 92.9, 92.7, 91.5, 91.1 MHz) is one of the private radio stations operating from different locations in Tamil Nadu. It is owned by Malar publications, Chennai. It is licensed to use the FM band frequency 106.4 MHz. It started in 2006 broadcasting from Chennai and Coimbatore. Later, in 2007 it expanded its broadcast to other cities in Tamil Nadu such as Madurai, Thiruchirappalli, Thirunelveli, Thoothukudi and to the union territory of Puducherry. At 2018, It started broadcasting from Salem, Vellore and Erode. At 2026, the station further expanded to Nagercoil, Tiruvannamalai and Vaniyambadi as a part of phase 3 batch 3 expansion.

== Locations ==
- Chennai 106.4 MHz
- Thiruchirappalli 106.4 MHz
- Madurai 106.4 MHz
- Coimbatore 106.4 MHz
- Thirunelveli 106.4 MHz
- Thoothukkudi 106.4 MHz
- Puducherry 106.4 MHz
- Vaniyambadi 94.5 MHz
- Tiruvanamalai 92.9 MHz
- Erode 92.7 MHz
- Salem 91.5 MHz
- Vellore 91.5 MHz
- Nagercoil 91.1 MHz
- Dubai 106.5 MHz (Radio Gilli - Ex radio Salaam)

== See also ==
- Dina Thanthi
- Malai Malar
- DT NEXT - (Chennai Based Daily English Newspaper)
- Thanthi TV
- Media in Chennai
- Media in Coimbatore
- Broadcasting in Chennai
- List of Indian-language radio stations
- FM broadcasting in India
- Tamil Language Media
- List of Sri Lankan broadcasters
