= Fazilka TV Tower =

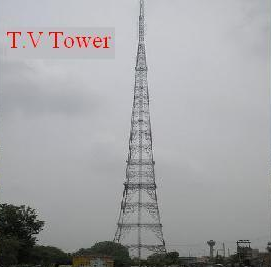

- Location within India

General information
- Status: Completed
- Type: Lattice television tower
- Location: Fazilka, Punjab, India
- Coordinates: 30°23′44.42″N 74°1′57.87″E
- Construction started: 1996
- Completed: 2007

Height
- Height: 304.8 m (1,000 ft)

Fazilka TV Tower, often nicknamed the Fazilka Eiffel Tower, is a 304.8 m (1,000 ft) tall lattice tower at Fazilka, Punjab, India, which is used for FM-/TV-broadcasting in the whole of Punjab. The tower is currently the forty-fourth in the world and the second tallest man-made structure in India.

The tower is able to broadcast TV programmes to all areas within 100 kilometres of its location. It is nicknamed the "Fazilka Eiffel Tower", although its similarity with the real Eiffel Tower is questionable at best. Fazilka TV Tower, after Rameswaram TV Tower, is the second-tallest man-made structure in India.

== History ==
The Fazilka TV Tower was built in 1996, completing its 11-year-long construction in 2007. However, nearly four years after it was erected and made functional, the Fazilka TV tower had failed to serve the very purpose, which necessitated its construction. The television and the radio signals from Pakistan, which the TV tower was supposed to weaken, are still as strong as ever. Worse, the whole of the population, mostly rural, in all areas around 100 kilometres from its location, which it was supposed to serve, has mostly switched over either to the cable connection or to the DTH. The 304.8 m (1,000 ft) tall free-standing lattice tower, the second tallest man-made structure in India after Rameswaram TV Tower which is approximately 1,060 ft tall, has turned into a "white elephant" now. Planned as a relay station on lines of Jalandhar Doordarshan Kendra, apart from weakening the signals from Pakistan, the tower now relays only Doordarshan channels. No programmes are made in the area even though the tower houses the equipment necessary to create and relay them.

The whole conflict between Indian and Pakistani television can be traced back to the mid-20th century. On 14 August 1947, Pakistan got its independence. Subsequently, from 15 August, Radio Pakistan Lahore became a hostile station. This rang alarm bells in New Delhi and since high-powered transmitters were unavailable in India, two low-powered 1-kilowatt medium-wave transmitters each were dispatched to Amritsar and Jalandhar. Thus, All India Radio Jalandhar-Amritsar came into existence. This arrangement continued for five years. Soon after independence the authorities in Pakistan increased the power of Lahore radio station from 10 kilowatts to 50 kilowatts. In 1953, All India Radio also installed a 50-kilowatt medium-wave transmitter at a place called Goraya, located equidistant from Ludhiana and Jalandhar. This arrangement continued until the 1990s. Pakistan added a 100-kilowatt medium-wave transmitter to its existing 50-kilowatt station in Lahore in 1965. India opened a 1-kilowatt medium-wave station at Chandigarh in 1965. Another radio station was to be opened at Amritsar, but due to the 1965 war with Pakistan, the idea was shelved. In the meanwhile, Radio Pakistan and Pakistan Television Service increased its presence in the border areas with India. Radio Pakistan then slowly and steadily kept opening new radio stations in the cities of Rawalpindi, Multan, Bahawalpur, Faisalabad, Mianwali, Islamabad and Sialkot. Pakistani television also dotted the entire border areas with Punjab, India with powerful transmitters. India started its second phase of expansion of broadcasting services in Punjab during the 1990s. During the 1990s, both the cities of Bathinda and Patiala possessed relay centers for Doordarshan and also got FM transmitters of All India Radio. The mother station at Jalandhar was upgraded with two high-powered medium-wave transmitters along with a 10-kilowatt FM transmitter. All India Radio Chandigarh was strengthened with a 10-kilowatt high-altitude transmitter at Kasauli, extending its range up to 110 miles radius. The construction of the Fazilka TV Tower followed in 1996 until its completion in 2007.

== Geography ==
The Fazilka TV Tower is situated in the city and/or municipal council of Fazilka (thus, the name), which in turn, lies in the northwestern state of Punjab, India.

== See also ==
- Lattice tower
- List of tallest towers in the world
- List of tallest freestanding structures in the world
- List of tallest freestanding steel structures
- Rameswaram TV Tower
- Indo-Pakistani War of 1965
- Indo-Pakistani War of 1971
