= Tamil radio on internet =

Tamil radio on internet has become very popular after the Sri Lankan Tamil national radio started broadcasting their services on the Internet. This new trend has attracted millions of Tamil listeners from all over the world, specially listeners from south India and a commercial service called "Varthaga Sevai" was started. This became a very popular Sri Lankan Tamil radio service and since then other private Tamil radio stations have also started broadcasting.

== Early days ==
The first private Tamil radio station was "Sooryan fm" who also started to stream over the Internet and captured all the Tamil listeners that the Tamil commercial service had built up. Sooryan fm quickly become very popular because of their simple Tamil. Competition for Tamil radio increased when several private Tamil radios started (Shakthi, Thalam, etc.). After Shakthi entered into Tamil TV the trend slightly changed away from radio and into television with the generation change.

== Internet radio ==
With the introduction of Internet radio, there were no Tamil-language stations with live announcers and programmes but there were and still are many Tamil stations broadcasting only Tamil songs. The first Internet station which was very famous for broadcasting only songs was "Superstarzfm". This ceased broadcasting after a while due to financial problems. Later, some young people with SObrothers joined and created the radio station "TamilsFlashFm", which is also known as TFFm. This is the first Tamil Youth Internet radio and within three years it had become very popular and reached monthly 60,000 Tamil Listeners worldwide. This station not only broadcast songs round the clock but also hosted live on air shows with young Rj's giving the listeners the chance to request songs through Skype and MSN. The current Program Manager of TamilFlash.Fm is Sabesan Kanagaratnam. Other radio stations followed TamilsFlashFm's lead and produced live shows on air.

Now there are other Internet radio stations which use the SHOUTcast technique to broadcast over the Internet. Also, radio and podcasting apps focused on India, such as JawaRadio, bring regional languages into their platform.

== See also ==
- List of Tamil-language radio stations
