= Full Contact Championship =

Mixed martial arts promoter based in Mumbai, India

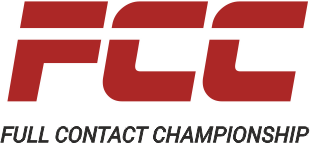
- Founded: 2009
- Founder: Prashant Kumar
- Headquarters: Mumbai, India
- Directors: Binoy Khimji; Joy Kapur
- Parent organization: Full Contact Entertainment Pvt. Ltd
- Website: www.fccmma.in

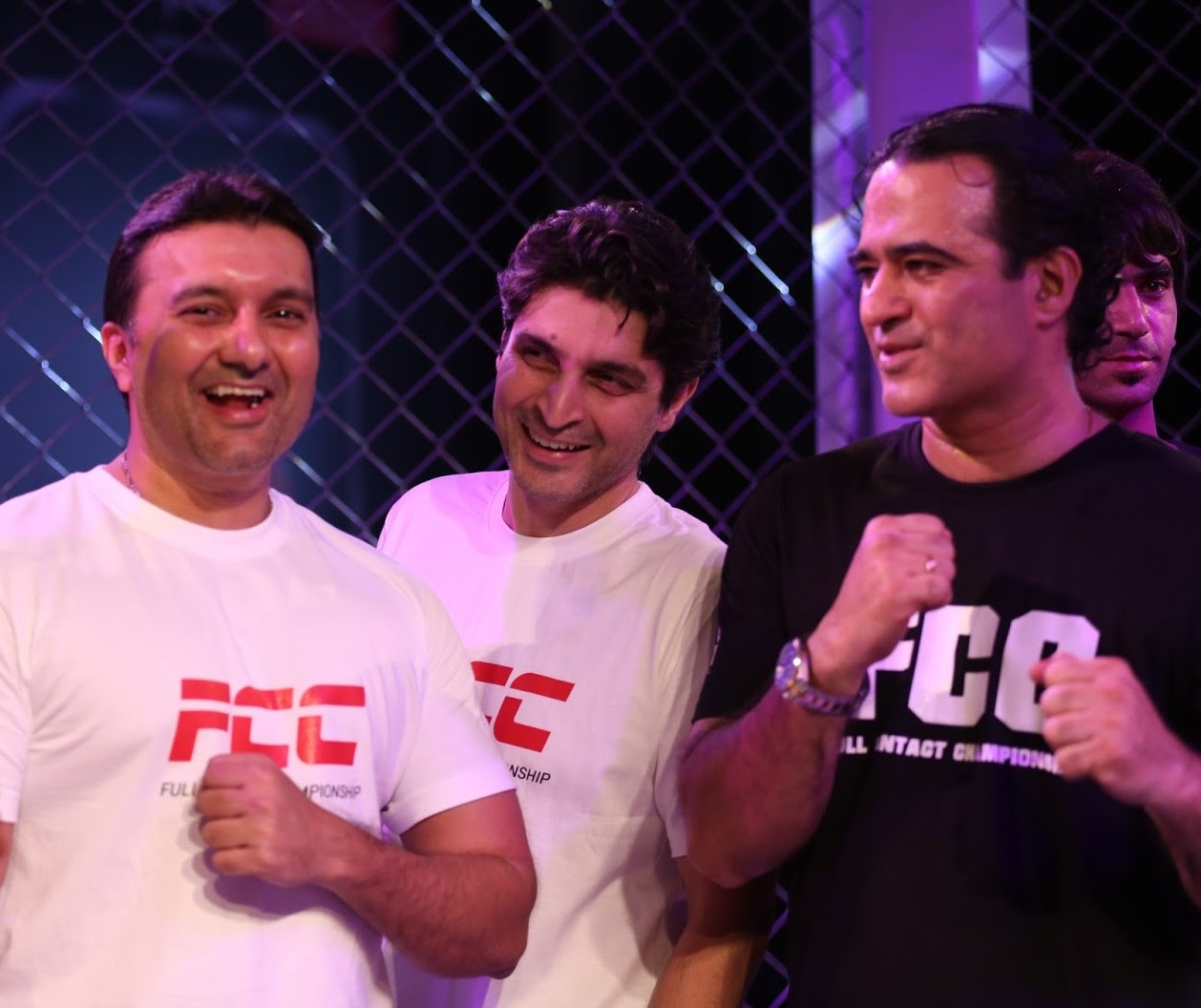
Directors of FCC: From Left - Binoy Khimji, Joy Kapur, Prashant Kumar

Full Contact Championship (FCC) is India's longest running professional mixed martial arts fight network. Founded in 2009, under the banner of Full Contact Entertainment Pvt. Ltd, FCC is India's first pro MMA organization. FCC has been sanctioned by Mixed Martial Arts Association of India and has followed the usual "Fight Night" format. It is one of the MMA organisations, formed to promote the sport of MMA in India and globally. Till date, FCC has had 13 fight nights; the most recent one being held at Indore on 9 July 2016 by the name of FCC-13.

== Management Team ==
1. Prashant Kumar - Founder & Director - Prashant is a Mixed Martial Arts expert who participated in Free Style Fighting in Mumbai in the early 1990s. Prashant has a Black Belt in Taekwondo, has trained in Kickboxing, Muay Thai, and has also cross trained in Grappling and Judo.
2. Binoy Khimji - Director
3. Joy Kapur - Director

== FCC Fight Nights ==
Since 2009, FCC has produced 13 fight nights. Their occurrence has been in the following order:

Fight Night	Venue	City
FCC-1	Famous Studios, Mahalaxmi	Mumbai
FCC-2	Famous Studios, Mahalaxmi	Mumbai
FCC-3	Famous Studios, Mahalaxmi	Mumbai
FCC-4	Filmalaya Studio, Andheri	Mumbai
FCC-5	Famous Studios, Mahalaxmi	Mumbai
FCC-6	Famous Studios, Mahalaxmi	Mumbai
FCC-7	Famous Studios, Mahalaxmi	Mumbai
FCC-8	Vagator Hill Top, Vagator	Goa
FCC-9	Famous Studios, Mahalaxmi	Mumbai
FCC-10	Vagator Hill Top, Vagator	Goa
FCC-11	Famous Studios, Mahalaxmi	Mumbai
FCC-12	Famous Studios, Mahalaxmi	Mumbai
FCC-13	Basketball Complex,	Indore

== Rules ==
FCC's current rules are based upon the Unified Rules of Mixed Martial Arts that were originally established by the New Jersey State Athletic Control Board and modified by the Nevada State Athletic Commission.

== Cage ==
FCC uses a 6 sided Hexagon cage for its fights. This cage was introduced in FCC-12. Prior to FCC-12, the fights took place in a square ring.

== FCC-12 ==
FCC-12 took place at Famous Studios, Mumbai on 29 January 2016. This was by far the biggest of FCC fight nights. This event marked the introduction of a hexagon fight cage into FCC. The fight night saw a total of 9 bouts, including a wild card entry bout as well. Wali "The Warrior", an Afghan mixed martial artist was the winner of the Main Event Bout, beating Mumbai's "Furious" Farhan. FCC-12 had a telecast on DD Sports and was widely covered by a lot of print, online and television media. It had online ticket sales on Bookmyshow and had partnered with Fever 104 FM for Radio Promotions. During the FCC-12 Fight Night, the founder Prashant Kumar announced FCC League - World's First ever MMA League. FCC league will be a 7 city team based league and will consist of 7 fighters in each team, one being an international fighter.

== FCC-13 ==
The team of FCC announced their 13th fight night in Indore and organized the same on 9 July 2016. A total of 12 bouts took place in this fight night. The media announcement was made on SR Media, a local TV channel and the venue for the same was Basketball Complex, Indore. The event saw a crowd of more than 2000 people flocking the stadium to witness FCC-13. Elli Avram was the guest of honor and Deep Money performed live at the fight night. FCC-13 featured 3 India v Afghanistan bouts.
