= Radio Tarang =

Former radio station in Hisar, India

- Hisar; India
- Broadcast area: Hisar
- Frequency: 104 MHz

Programming
- Language: Hindi

Ownership
- Owner: Singhal Properties

History
- First air date: 2007
- Last air date: 12 September 2008

Links
- Webcast: www.radiotarang.com
- Website: www.radiotarang.com

Radio Tarang was a radio station based in Hisar city of Haryana, India. It was started in 2007 and was owned by Vivek Singhal of Singla Properties. It became non-operational on 12 September 2008 and on 17 July 2009, its license was revoked.

During its run, it was the first regional FM channel in India to broadcast British Broadcasting Corporation content on it.

== See also ==
- All India Radio Hisar
- BIG FM 92.7
- CCS HAU Community Radio Station
- DD Haryana
- Radio Dhamaal
- Radio Mantra
