= Radio program =

Segment of content intended for broadcast on radio

A radio program, radio programme, or radio show is a segment of content intended for broadcast on radio. It may be a one-time production, or part of a periodically recurring series. A single program in a series is called an episode.

== Radio networks ==
A radio network is a complex system designed for the transmission of data, information, or signals via radio waves. These networks are an integral part of modern telecommunications, enabling communication between various devices and services over varying distances. Radio networks have evolved significantly since their inception, with numerous types and technologies emerging to cater to diverse needs and applications. There are different types of networks:

- Broadcast radio network: Broadcast radio networks are designed to transmit audio content, such as music, news, talk shows, and advertisements. They operate over designated frequency bands and often employ a hierarchical structure, with large broadcasting stations relaying signals to smaller regional or local stations. AM and FM are common modulation techniques used in broadcast radio. This type of broadcasting is mostly used by radio stations and transmits only audio through radio waves.
- Cellular network: Cellular networks are a type of radio network that facilitates mobile telecommunications. These networks are divided into geographical areas known as cells, each served by a base station. Cellular networks enable seamless communication for mobile devices as they move across cell boundaries. Technologies like 2G, 3G, 4G, and 5G have successively enhanced cellular network capabilities, offering faster data speeds, improved coverage, and reduced latency.
- Two-way radio network: Two-way radio networks are commonly used in public safety organizations, transportation sectors, industrial settings, and emergency services. Push-to-Talk (PTT) technology, often used in two-way radio systems, allows users to transmit messages instantly, mimicking the functionality of traditional walkie-talkies.
- Digital radio network: Digital radio networks utilize digital modulation techniques to transmit audio signals with improved quality and efficiency compared to traditional analog systems. Digital radio can offer features like better sound fidelity, text displays, and data services. DAB (Digital Audio Broadcasting) and HD Radio are examples of digital radio technologies.

== International radio ==
In the 1950s, a small but growing cohort of rock and pop music fans, dissatisfied with the BBC's output, would listen to Radio Luxembourg – but only to some extent and probably not enough to have any impact on the BBC's monopoly; and invariably only at night, when the signal from Luxembourg could be received more easily. During the post-1964 period, offshore radio broadcasting from ships at anchor or abandoned forts (such as Radio Caroline) helped to supply the demand in western Europe for pop and rock music. The BBC launched its own pop music station, BBC Radio 1, in 1967.

International broadcasts became highly popular in major world languages. Of particular impact were programs by the BBC World Service, Voice of America, Radio Moscow, China Radio International, Radio France Internationale, Deutsche Welle, Radio Free Europe/Radio Liberty, Vatican Radio and Trans World Radio.

== Radio programming ==
Interest in old-time radio has increased in recent years with programs traded and collected on reel-to-reel tapes, cassettes and CDs and Internet downloads, as well as the popularity of podcasts.

== Formats ==
Radio program formats include:

- News and current affairs
  - Documentaries
  - Interviews
  - Radio discussion
- Entertainment
  - Music shows
  - Radio comedy
  - Radio drama
- Radio magazine
- Sports radio
- Talk shows

== Well-known radio programs ==
United Kingdom

- Crossing Continents
- I'm Sorry I Haven't a Clue
- The Archers
- The Goon Show
- The Official Big Top 40

United States

- A Prairie Home Companion
- American Top 40
- Democracy Now!
- Grand Ole Opry
- Hawaii Calls
- This American Life
- X Minus One

India

- Binaca Geetmala
- Hawa Mahal

== See also ==
- History of radio
- List of old-time radio people
- List of old-time radio programs
