= Sigappu Nada =

Sigappu Nada ('Red Tape') (Tamil: சிகப்பு நாடா)
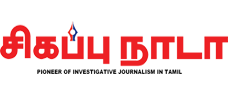
- Type: Weekly magazine, website
- Format: Book, website
- Owner(s): R. Prathap Chander
- Founder(s): P. Kailai Mannan
- Publisher: R. Prathap Chander
- Editor: R. Prathap Chander
- Founded: 20 January 1970
- Language: Tamil
- Headquarters: Velachery, Chennai, Tamil Nadu, India.
- RNI: 17884/70
- Website: www.sigappunada.com

Sigappu Nada (Tamil) (Tamil: சிகப்பு நாடா) is a Tamil weekly investigative journalism magazine published by R. Prathap Chander. The first issue was published on 20 January 1970. The web edition of Sigappu Nada was launched on 1 June 2016.

== History ==
Sigappu nada (சிகப்பு நாடா) was founded in Chennai on 20 January 1970 as a monthly, by P. Kailai Mannan. It was an investigative journalism magazine that brings out the scams and crimes inside and outside government.

== Name ==
The magazine is named Sigappu Nada (Tamil: சிகப்பு நாடா) because the most confidential documents of government offices are kept in a file bound with red tape. This secret files and scams in government are issued in Sigappu Nada. It created an impact among corrupt government officials.

== Notice issued ==
According to the Contempt of Courts Act 1971, a notice was issued against the founder of Sigappu Nada (P. Kumaraswamy alias Kalai Mannan) regarding his article about corruption by four judges of Madras High Court in a judgement.

== See also ==
- Tamil Language Magazines
- Tamil Language Media
