= Modi Ke Matwale Rahi =

Modi Ke Matwale Rahi was a popular weekly radio show in India broadcast on the Vividh Bharati service. Along with some other shows like Hawa Mahal, Modi Ke Matwale Rahi was one of the few programs that was suitable for spot advertising on Indian radio, which often led to commercial spots on the program being in high-demand and sold-out six-months in advance. The program won a Clio Award for Advertising in the 1970s.

The show featured two main characters, Balwan Singh and Lalit Singh, who were faced with a mystery in each episode that they had to solve. The show was sponsored by Modi Tyres.
