= RJ Disha Oberoi =

Indian radio jockey

Disha Oberoi
- Born: Disha Oberoi; Delhi
- Other name: RJ Disha
- Education: Manipal Institute of Communication
- Occupations: RJ, Flight Attendant

Disha Oberoi, popularly known as RJ Disha, is a radio jockey from Bangalore, India. She works as RJ in Red FM 93.5.

== Early life and education ==
Disha was born in Delhi, brought up in Chennai. She went to college in Manipal.

== Career ==
Disha started her career as a flight attendant with Jetairways an international airline. During her stint as a flight attendant, people used to compliment her on a unique voice and announcement skills and also advised her to experiment by putting it to good use. She attended a workshop on RJ'ing and ended up being an RJ in Chennai. She moved to Bangalore later and became one among the best RJ's the city has ever seen.

== Awards ==
Disha's show "Morning No 1 with Disha" has won the "New York Film Festival’s World’s Best Radio Programs Awards" in different categories consecutively for 4 years now.

- Best Information/News Talk Show in 2015
- Best Human Interest Story in 2016.
