= Radio Mantra =

Operated by Dainik Jagran group

Radio Mantra is owned and operated by Dainik Jagran group promoting Shri Puran Multimedia Ltd (SPML). Radio Mantra has presence in eight cities across Uttar Pradesh, Haryana, Punjab & Jharkhand. It operates on frequency of 91.9 MHz.

Later in 2017 Radio mantra was re-branded as Radio City

== Overview ==
Radio Mantra is the first FM channel to be launched in Agra and Faizabad, Gorakhpur.

Below is the list of cities, where Radio Mantra gives its service:

- Jalandhar
- Agra
- Bareilly
- Gorakhpur
- Hissar
- Karnal
- Ranchi
- Varanasi

== Radio Mantra initiatives ==
Radio Mantra took many initiatives and supported movements like Earth Hour.

Radio Mantra also launched a singing talent hunt contest 'Super Singer' with cash award of 50,000 INR, to find new talents in the field of music. This was a high standard show with eminent personalities from Bollywood as judge. Vaibhav Saxena was one of the judges for radio mantra gorakhpur contest held in 2016.

== Radio jockeys ==
RJ Preet (jalandhar)
RJ Garima (jalandhar)
RJ Ramit (jalandhar)
