= RJ Praveen =

Indian radio presenter

- Born: Praveen Sethia; Patratu
- Education: University of Calcutta
- Occupation: Radio presenter
- Years active: 2006–present
- Known for: Presenting

RJ Praveen (born as Praveen Sethia) is an Indian radio jockey currently working at Red FM. He presents the Morning No.1 Show with RJ Praveen from 6 am to 12 pm. He is known for hosting the show Red Murga.He has done commercials with celebrities like Shah Rukh Khan, Sourav Ganguly.

== Early life ==
Praveen Sethia was born on 27 September 1985 Matri Mangal hospital in kolkata. Praveen's father is Mahendra sethia, a businessman. His mother is Chanda Sethia, a housewife.

He completed his graduation from the University of Calcutta.

== Career ==
Praveen has started his career as a Customer Care Associate at Shopper’s Stop. He also worked in a call center as a voice quality analyst at Accenture Technology. In 2006 he joined Red FM as a Radio Jockey.

In Red FM he has hosted a show named Ek Kahani Aisi Bhi, which won the award of Best Narrated Show at the New York Radio Festival in 2015 and 2016.

== Shows ==
- Desh Ka Naam
- Ek Kahani Aisi Bhi
- U-turn
- Umeedon Ka Repair
- Red Murga
