= List of Tamil-language magazines =

The following is a list of Tamil-language magazines published across the world.

== India ==
| Name | Tamil Name | Frequency | Publisher/Parent Company | Established | Circulation | Notes |
|---|---|---|---|---|---|---|
| Ananda Vikatan | ஆனந்த விகடன் | Weekly | Vikatan Group Pvt. Ltd | 1926 | | |
| Junior Vikatan | ஜூனியர் விகடன் | Weekly Twice | Vikatan Group Pvt. Ltd | | | |
| Naanayam Vikatan | நாணயம் விகடன் | Weekly | Vikatan Group Pvt. Ltd | | | |
| Aval Vikatan | அவள் விகடன் | Fortnightly | Vikatan Group Pvt. Ltd | | | |
| Sakthi Vikatan | சக்தி விகடன் | Fortnightly | Vikatan Group Pvt. Ltd | | | |
| Pasumai Vikatan | பசுமை விகடன் | Fortnightly | Vikatan Group Pvt. Ltd | | | |
| Motor Vikatan | மோட்டார் விகடன் | Monthly | Vikatan Group Pvt. Ltd | | | |
| Sigappu Nada | சிகப்பு நாடா | Weekly | | 20 January 1970 | | Tamil investigative journalism |
| Cinema Express | சினிமா எக்ஸ்பிரஸ் | Fortnightly | The New Inress | January 10, 1980 | | Final Issue on February 16, 2016 |
| Kalki | கல்கி | Weekly | | | | |
| Kumudam | குமுதம் | | | | | |
| Kungumam | குங்குமம் | | | | | |
| Nakkheeran | நக்கீரன் | | | | | |
| Puthiya Thalaimurai | புதிய தலைமுறை | | | | | |
| Pesum Padam | பேசும் படம் | | | | | |
| Vanakkam Pudhuvai | வணக்கம் புதுவை | Weekly | Vanakkam Pudhuvai | 20 November 2022 | | TAMIL Weekly newspaper |
| Thuglak | துக்ளக் | | | | | |
| Rani Online | ராணி | Weekly | Maalaimalar | 30 May 1962 | | |

== See also ==
- Lists of Tamil-language media
