= FM99 Sri Lanka =

Radio station in Sri Lanka

FM99 Sri Lanka was a Sri Lankan radio station. FM99 started broadcasting on 13 June 1993, as the first private radio channel in Sri Lanka, under the license granted to then director Livy Wijemanne. The radio station was shut down on 31 January 1996 for separation of its mediums. The station broadcast in three languages on the same channel, at different times of day:

- 06 am - 10 am (English)
- 10 am - 01 pm (Sinhala)
- 01 pm - 04 pm (Tamil)
- 04 pm - 12 am (English)

The channel's English broadcast covered many genres of music, including pop, jazz, and country. Some announcers were from the national Sri Lanka Broadcasting Corporation, and FM99 also introduced many new radio personalities. The Sinhala broadcast highlighted music from the 1960s, 1970s, 1980s and 1990s, again introducing new presenters. The Tamil broadcast was on a similar rotation with many interviews covered as well with some eminent personalities. The FM99 studios were located at the Colombo Marriott hotel, now the Galadari, on the second floor. The full office complex was a total of 5 rooms including the transmission area.
