= Aamar FM =

Former radio station in Kolkata, India

Coordinates: 22.667695°N 88.383271°E

Kolkata, West Bengal; India
- Frequency: 106.2 MHz

Programming
- Language: Bengali

History
- First air date: 2003
- Last air date: January 23, 2020

Links
- Webcast: http://gir.fm/?play=kol-1062
- Website: www.aamar106fm.com/

Aamar FM (literally meaning My FM) was an FM radio channel in Kolkata, India. It was the only private radio station whose on-air presentation language was Bengali. This station had started its broadcasting in 2003 and had stopped suddenly on 23 January 2020 without any early announcement.

Aamar 106.2 FM described itself as "The Radio Station Built for Kolkata by Kolkatans". The tagline was "Kolkata's Best Music" and "Kolkatar Gaan, Kolkatar Pran", which means "The Song of Kolkata and the Life of Kolkata".

== History ==
This channel had done a lot to uplift young singers and had worked a lot to make some modern Bengali songs popular, especially the Bengali Bands. This was a very popular channel, among the Bengalees who lived in Kolkata. This channel only broadcast old and modern Bengali songs along with old Hindi Songs, which made it popular among older people, as well as the new generation of younger people in Kolkata. This channel had no online broadcasting, only offline broadcasting was available.

== Closure ==
The reason for the closure of this radio station, as stated by the authority, refers to the economical problem, as the employees did not receive a salary from October 2019, though, they continued their jobs without salary, to save the station. But, without any notice, the authority locked the door on 23 January 2020.
