= Radio Choklate =

Coordinates: 20.293364°N 85.853974°E

- Bhubaneswar; India
- Broadcast area: Odisha, India
- Frequency: 104 MHz

Programming
- Language: Odia

Ownership
- Owner: Sambad Group (Eastern Media Limited)

History
- First air date: 4 May 2007

Links
- Website: radiochoklate.com

Radio Choklate 104 FM is a part of the Sambad Group (Eastern Media Limited). Radio Choklate provides service in Odisha, predominantly in the regional Odia language along with Hindi and English. It airs Odia and Hindi music, covers local news, popular trends and stories that cater to the human interest. It is part of Soumya Ranjan Patnaik's Eastern Media Limited holdings.

The station was launched on 4 May 2007. In 2017 the station hosted the Choklate Awards show.

== Broadcasting ==
Radio Choklate is broadcast from Cuttack and Rourkela stations in Odisha at 104 FM frequency and live streamed via Radio Choklate Online (www.radiochoklateonline.com).

== Programmes ==
Daily shows are listed below:

1. Stotra: Early morning show consisting of shlokas, aired at 4 am

2. Punya Ra Nadi Tire: Devotional show presented by RJ Arjya, aired at 5 am

3. Sakaala Ra Pahili Gaadi Re: Morning show hosted by RJ Komal that gives out updates on weather, fashion, special occasions, festivals, traffic, etc., aired at 7 am

4. Baata Chaada, Anil Aasuchi: Mid-morning show anchored by RJ Anil that includes chit-chat with people from various walks of life, aired at 10 am

5. Diary of a Housewife: Monologue of a housewife, aired at 12 noon

6. Sei Jhuma Jhuma Golaapi Bela Re: Anecdotes, stories, history, trivia of Ollywood and sometimes, Bollywood presented by RJ Niel, aired at 1 pm

7. Tuma Paeen Gita Tiye: Listeners request RJ Nivy to play their songs, aired at 3 pm

8. Choklate Countdown: RJs Komal & Anil present the latest Bollywood updates of the day, aired at 5 pm

9. Choklate 20-20: RJ Nadeem presents top 20 songs of the day along with some trending informations of the day, aired at 8 pm

10. Prema Ra Formula: All about love and relationships with RJ Koyal, aired at 10 pm

11. Sahara Ra Bati Sabu Libhi Gala Pare: RJ Niel talks to listeners over phone, to interact with them on light topics, aired at 1 am

Weekend special shows are as follows:

1. Kalamandir Geetmala: Aired every Friday at 8 pm

2. Love Story: Love stories by RJ Sangram, aired every Saturday 9 pm

3. Bhaya: Horror show, aired every Saturday and Sunday at 10 pm

4. Asaadhaarana: Talk show hosted by RJ Sangram, in conversation with individuals with an indomitable spirit, aired every Sunday at 8 am

5. Baabuna: Aired every Sunday at 3 pm

6. Rangamancha: Enactments and plays on various social issues, aired every Sunday at 9 pm

7. Eyi Maati Ra Itihaasa: A show based on Strories of Odia Warriors, who fought for an independent odisha.

== Other ==
Radio Choklate released a music video for Holi celebrations.
