= Deccan Radio =

Community radio station in Hyderabad, India

- Hyderabad; India
- Frequency: 107.8 MHz

Programming
- Format: Community radio

Ownership
- Owner: Abid Ali Khan Educational Trust

History
- First air date: 23 December 2009

Deccan Radio was a community radio station in Hyderabad, India, operating on 107.8 MHz FM. The station was licensed to the Abid Ali Khan Educational Trust and broadcast a limited schedule of community programs.

The station had evidently ceased regular broadcasting around 2015. During this time, a new community station, Radio Charminar, started on the frequency, transmitting from a site 3 kilometres (1.9 mi) away from Deccan. The result was a complaint from Charminar, which claimed Deccan's broadcasts and consequent interference made advertisers hesitant to purchase air time on the other station.
