= Hawa Mahal (radio program) =

Indian radio show

Hawa Mahal (translation: "Palace of Winds" or "Palace of Breezes") was a nightly radio show in India broadcast on the Vividh Bharati service. It has a skit-format, where stories from various writers were dramatized into plays. Along with some other shows like Modi Ke Matwale Rahi, Hawa Mahal was one of the few programs that were suitable for spot advertising on Indian radio, which often led to commercial spots on the program being in high-demand and sold-out six-months in advance.
