= Suryan FM =

Indian FM radio network

- Tamil Nadu; India
- Frequencies: 91.9–93.9 MHz

Programming
- Language: Tamil

Ownership
- Owner: Sun Group

Links
- Website: www.suryanfm.in

Suryan FM is a Tamil language FM radio channel owned by Indian media conglomerate Sun Group. The channel has 10 broadcasting stations in Tamil Nadu. In other states, SUN Group's FM service is known as Red FM 93.5 and Magic FM 106.4.

== Radio stations ==
Suryan FM Tamil Nadu
Frequency	City
93.5 MHz	Chennai, Coimbatore, Pondicherry, Madurai, Tirunelveli, Tuticorin, Tiruchirappalli
93.9 MHz	Vellore, Salem
91.9 MHz	Erode, Nagercoil

== See also ==
- Broadcasting in Chennai
- List of Indian-language radio stations
- FM broadcasting in India
- Tamil Language Media
- List of Sri Lankan broadcasters
