= Ishq FM =

Delhi, Kolkata, Mumbai; India
- Frequency: 104.8 MHz

Programming
- Languages: Hindi, Bengali
- Format: Pop/adult contemporary

Ownership
- Owner: India Today Group
- Operator: Radio Today Broadcasting Ltd

History
- First air date: 30 May 2007
- Former names: MEOW, OYE
- Call sign meaning: Hindi word for love

Links
- Webcast: Listen Live
- Website: ishq.com

Ishq FM (104.8 MHz) is a romantic music radio station broadcasting in Delhi, Mumbai, and Kolkata, India.

It was initially launched by India Today Group on 30 May 2007 as Meow FM, which was a talk-based station and served Delhi, Indore, Mumbai and Kolkata. Directed at a female audience, the station had its own social network, "Meri Meow".

In September 2010, the station changed its name to Oye FM and its programming to a Filmi format. In December 2016, it was rebranded as Ishq FM, from the Hindi word for "love", broadcasting romantic music.

== See also ==
- FM broadcasting in India
- List of FM radio stations in India
- India Today Group
