= Lists of Tamil-language media =

This is an index of lists of Tamil-language media.

- List of Tamil-language newspapers
- List of Tamil-language radio stations
- List of Tamil-language television channels
- List of Tamil-language magazines
- List of Tamil-language films

== See also ==
- Media in Chennai
