= Gyan Vani =

- Delhi, India; India
- Broadcast area: National
- Frequency: 105.6 FM
- Branding: Gyan Vani

Ownership
- Owner: Indira Gandhi National Open University

History
- First air date: March 2000

Links
- Website: http://www.ignou.ac.in/ignou/aboutignou/broadcast/3

Gyan Vani is an educational FM radio station in several cities of India.

== Description ==
Gyan Vani is an educational FM radio station in several cities of India. Gyan Vani stations operate as a media cooperative with the day-to-day programmes being contributed by various educational institutions, NGOs, government and semi-government organizations, UN agencies, ministries such as Agriculture, Environment, Health, Women and Child Welfare, Science & Technology, etc. besides national level institutions such as NCERT, NIOS and state open universities. Each Gyan Vani station has a range of about 60 km and covers an entire city including the adjoining rural areas.

The medium of broadcast is English, Hindi or language of the region. Each nodal centre is provided with media from Indira Gandhi National Open University's (IGNOU) Electronic Media Production Centre. The centre serves purposes of production, dissemination and transmission of educational material. The facilities available at the media production centre are shared with various educational and training institutions, state open universities, central and state government ministries or departments, non governmental organizations, corporate bodies and other sectors. Once the Government of India through a cabinet decision decided to allot one frequency for Education with IGNOU as the nodal agency, Dr R Sreedher, then the director of EMPC designed the network by organising a series of brain storming sessions. His idea was to use the audio video studios available with the educational institutions for producing the programmes and use the AIR or the Doordarshan, public broadcasters' towers and technical facilities for transmission. He wanted to hire these facilities instead of creating his own infrastructure and appointing technical persons. A memorandum of understanding was signed between IGNOU and Prasar Bharati to share the towers. But as of 2013 there are 37 stations functioning. But the original concept of localised broadcasts have been given a go by and most of them are relaying the Delhi programmes. The second phase of radio privatisation even though reserved one frequency for education, neither the MHRD, the nodal ministry nor IGNOU, has taken any interest in pursuing the network. Change of governments and the party in power at the centre, resulted in step-motherly treatment of the network. Dr Sreedher left IGNOU in 2003 and thereafter the EMPC centre is not having any other dynamic director. The regular director, VK Arora was able to complete the task of installing 37 transmitters but was responsible for deviating from original programmes to a relay concept. After Arora left, a new regular full-time director has not been appointed and also the autonomous status of EMPC has been withdrawn making the centre really helpless in expanding the network

== History ==
In March 2000, when FM frequency licenses were auctioned, the Ministry of Human Resource Development (MHRD) had been given a frequency for educational broadcasting in each of the 40 cities. The ministry handed the task to IGNOU as it already had some experience telecasting education on Gyan Darshan. IGNOU signed a MOU with Prasar Bharati with an understanding that Prasar Bharati shall provide its infrastructure and also set up and operate the FM stations for educational broadcasts. The signatory of MOU were Shri K. S. Prasada Rao Registrar, IGNOU and Hari Om Srivastava, Chief Engineer from All India radio. The MOU was signed in Presence of Shri H. P. Dixit, Vice Chancellor of IGNOU and Shri Anil Baijal, CEO, Prasar Bharati. IGNOU started broadcasting in Allahabad, Bangalore, Bhopal, Coimbatore, Lucknow and Vishakhapatnam. This was to expand to 40 other cities in two years. Gyan Vani's Educational FM Radio Network has spread to 37 cities and towns across the country. A proposal to start Gyan Vani Stations at another 15 places is under consideration of the Ministries of HRD and Information & Broadcasting.
