= Radio Nasha =

Indian radio station

Radio Nasha (Hindi: रेडियो नशा) was an Indian regional radio station under the HT Media Group based in New Delhi, India. It broadcasts Indian retro music, predominantly from the 1970s to the 1990s. It also broadcasts talk shows featuring various Bollywood celebrities. Radio Nasha 107.2 FM was originally launched in Delhi in March 2016, and expanded to Mumbai with Radio Nasha 91.9 FM in April 04, of the same year. After few years later Radio Nasha became available in Kolkata as 94.3 FM Radio Nasha instead of 94.3 FM Radio One.

Radio Nasha ended its 10 year long run in Mumbai on 14th June, 2026 after HT Media decided to surrender it's licence.

== Content ==
- "Mast Mast Morning" with RJ Rangeeli Ruchi at 7 am (Mon-Fri).
- "The G9 Show" with RJ Divya Solgama at 2 pm (Mon-Fri).
- "Dhak Dhak Evening" with RJ Sheetal at 5 pm (Mon-Fri).
