= Radio One (India) =

Indian commercial radio network

94.3 Radio One
- India
- Frequency: 94.3 MHz (95.0 MHz in Ahmedabad)

Programming
- Format: International/English-language (Mumbai, Delhi, Bangalore); Retro Hindi contemporary (Ahmedabad, Pune)

Ownership
- Owner: HT Media Ltd
- Sister stations: Fever 104 FM, Radio Nasha

History
- Last air date: 2026

Links
- Website: radioone.in

94.3 Radio One was a commercial radio network in India owned by HT Media. It had radio stations in Mumbai, Delhi, Bangalore, Ahmedabad, Kolkata and Pune. The station shut down in 2026.

== History ==
The newspaper Mid-Day founded the station as Radio Midday in Mumbai, which was re-launched in 2002 as Go 92.5, an English-language (later also Hindi) radio station, by operating on the 92.5 MHz brand before relaunching itself as Radio One with a new frequency in 2006.

The network is one of the few broadcasting in English (called "international format") in all of India's three biggest cities: Mumbai, Delhi and Bangalore. It targets an upscale audience. All stations broadcast at 94.3 MHz except the one in Ahmedabad which is at 95.0 MHz.

94.3 Radio One was ranked as India's most attractive radio brand 2017 (out of two radio brands listed), and at place 531 among all brands, in the annual publication India's Most Attractive Brands.

The network is owned by Next Radio Ltd., a subsidiary of Next MediaWorks.

Next MediaWorks, the owner of Radio One, was bought by HT Media in 2019, thus expanding Hindustan Times FM service with three brands. (Fever 104 FM, Radio Nasha and Radio One).

94.3 Radio One Delhi, Mumbai and Bangalore also stream live on ONLINE at http://1cast.in (World Wide Web URL) AND the company has also launched India's first online audio business channel - Business ONE, in January 2018 (the business channel operates 9am-4pm mon-fri).

HT Media shuttered its two FM stations in Chennai in 2025; it surrendered the licence for Radio One on 24 October and shut down the Fever 104 FM station there on 24 December. In a financial statement, HT noted that the Chennai stations were not contributing to company revenues.

Radio One International ended its run in Mumbai, Delhi and Bengaluru on 14th June, 2026 after HT Media decided to surrender its licences in key metro cities.

== About ==
Though a network, Radio One stations aun several different formats. Its Delhi, Mumbai and Bangalore stations ran international music aimed at an upscale audience. The Kolkata station ran a Hindi-language retro format, and the Pune and Ahmedabad stations aired a contemporary hit radio format.
