= Red FM (India) =

Indian FM radio network

- India
- Frequency: 93.5 (in most cities)

Programming
- Format: Contemporary (Hindi, Regional), Countdown

Ownership
- Owner: Sun Group

Links
- Website: www.redfmindia.in

Red FM (Often stylized as Superhits 93.5 RED FM) is an Indian FM radio network headquartered in Chennai and owned by Chennai-based Sun Group. The network broadcasts content in various Indian languages including Hindi, Urdu, Bengali, Telugu, Kannada and Malayalam. On 14 August 2009, Suryan FM 93.5 was rebranded to RED FM in 64 cities across India. Thus, Sun Group's FM service came to be known with brand name RED FM across India except Tamil Nadu.

== Locations served ==
- It serves as Suryan FM in 10 Cities across Tamilnadu.
- It serves as Red FM in more than 57 cities across the country listed below.
- Parallelly it also serves as Magic FM in Hyderabad and Mumbai (sister channels to Red FM) .

== Red FM ==
Frequency	City
91.9 MHz	Jammu JK
95.0 MHz	Agartala TR, Surat GJ, Thrissur KL
106.4 MHz	Jhansi UP
93.5 MHz	Ahmedabad GJ, Rajkot GJ, Vadodara GJ, Aizawl MZ, Aurangabad MH, Dhule MH, Nagpur MH, Nanded MH, Nashik MH, Pune MH, Mumbai MH, Amritsar PB, Asansol WB, Kolkata WB, Siliguri WB, Varanasi UP, Prayagraj UP, Lucknow UP, Kanpur UP, Jamshedpur JH, Bengaluru KA, Gulbarga KA, Mangalore KA, Mysuru KA, Hubli-Dharwad KA, Bhopal MP, Indore MP, Jabalpur MP, Bhubaneswar OD, Chandigarh, Delhi NCR, Dehradun UK, Shillong ML, Gangtok SK, Guwahati AS, Jaipur RJ, Jodhpur RJ, Udaipur RJ, Kannur KL, Kochi KL, Kozhikode KL, Thiruvananthapuram KL, Leh LA, Patna BR, Muzaffarpur BR, Srinagar JK, Tirupati AP, Vijayawada AP, Visakhapatnam AP, Rajahmundry AP, Nellore AP, Warangal TS, Hyderabad TS

== Magic FM ==
Frequency	City
106.4 MHz	Hyderabad TS, Mumbai MH

== Radio jockeys and their shows and achievements ==
Name	Location	Show	Achievement
RJ Rishi	Hyderabad	Nescafe morning's & Everything special	2023 IRA Popular Rj
RJ Chaitanya (Chaitu)	Hyderabad	Midnight Masti (Biryani)	2018 Best RJ
RJ Disha	Morning No.1	2023 IRA Popular Rj Runner Up	
RJ Julius	Morning No.1	Vibe Wala Show	
RJ Prithvi	Morning No.1	KA 935	
RJ Rubina	Thoda Personal		
RJ Akriti	Mumbai	Channel No.935	
RJ Malishka	Mumbai	Morning No 1	
RJ Rocky	Vellapaanti	Unmusiced 50	
RJ Deepak	Mysuru	Namaskara Mysuru	
RJ Rashmi	Mysuru	Music Adda	
RJ Madhuri	Mysuru	Red Junction	
RJ Manish	Mysuru	Red Rewind	
RJ Vivek	Mysuru	Bindaas Bajaisi	
RJ Deepak	Mangaluru	Namaskara Mangaluru	
RJ Rashmi	Mangaluru	Bindaas Bajaisi	
RJ Megha	Hubballi-Dharwada	Namaskara Hubballi Dharwada	
RJ Madhuri	Hubballi-Dharwada	Bindaas Bajaisi	
RJ Vivek	Hubballi-Dharwada	Music Adda	
RJ Vani	Kalaburagi	Namaskara Kalaburagi	
RJ Sameen	Srinagar	Morning No.1	
RJ Rafiq	Srinagar	Vellapanti	
RJ Rayees	Srinagar	JK93.5	
RJ Praveen	Kolkata	Morning No.1	
RJ Ishaan	Bhubaneswar	U Turn	
RJ Renu	Indore	Morning No.1	
RJ Devaki	Ahmedabad	Morning No.1	
RJ Ishita	Rajkot	Morning No.1	
RJ Tammy	Siliguri	WB 935	
RJ Hemanth	Thiruvananthapuram	Bindass Bollywood	
RJ Pahi	Guwahati	Love Story	
