= Fever 104 FM =

- India
- Frequency: 104 MHz in most cities
- Branding: Fever 104 FM

Programming
- Format: Indian-language Contemporary, Countdown

Ownership
- Owner: HT Media
- Sister stations: Radio One (India), Radio Nasha

History
- First air date: 2006
- Last air date: 2026

Links
- Website: www.fever.fm

Fever FM was an FM radio station in India. It was available in 14 cities in India and was owned by HT Media. The station shut down in 2026.

== Music & Bollywood ==
Fever plays contemporary hit music in Delhi, Mumbai and Chennai, while the other cities have a mix of contemporary and retro Bollywood music. There are differentiating packages too through which music is played, like 40 mins non-stop music, Fever Unplugged, Fever Ka Thappa (Fever certification on the biggest songs), Teen Gaane Back to Back, Fever Top 10 and Fever Super Fresh. In 2016 and 2017, Fever FM had the maximum number of song exclusives in the industry, where a song breaks first on Fever FM for a few days and then on other Radio channels. Fever FM has also been the official movie partner for the biggest movies in Bollywood, like Jab Harry Met Sejal, Dangal, Tiger Zinda Hai, Padmaavat, Badrinath Ki Dulhania, Dilwale and Tamasha.

== Sports Alliances ==
Fever FM is credited with the maximum sports alliances in the industry. In the Indian Premier League, it has been the official Radio Partner of Delhi Daredevils for 11 years, with Kolkata Knight Riders for 8 years and with Mumbai Indians and Royal Challengers Bangalore for 7 years. In Indian Super League, Fever FM has been the official Radio partner for ATK (Atletico De Kolkata). Fever FM has been the official radio partner of Formula One and Indian Hockey League, while also partnering with Baahubali Boxers in the Super Boxing League.

== Areas of operation ==
Unless specified, all stations are on 104.0 MHz

- Delhi
- Mumbai, MH
- Bengaluru, KA
- Kolkata, WB
- Chennai, TN (broadcast on 91.9 MHz)
- Hyderabad, TS (broadcast on 94.3 MHz)
- Lucknow, UP
- Kanpur, UP (broadcast on 95.0 MHz)
- Agra, UP (broadcast on 93.7 MHz)
- Aligarh, UP (broadcast on 94.9 MHz)
- Prayagraj, UP (broadcast on 94.3 MHz)
- Ayodhya, UP (broadcast on 94.3 MHz)
- Gorakhpur, UP (as Fever 94.3 FM)
- Bareilly, UP (Broadcast on 94.9 MHz)
- Nashik Coming Soon

== In popular culture ==
In Season 3, Episode 9 of US TV show The Big Bang Theory, The Vengeance Formulation, the character Raj Koothrappali mentions Fever 104 FM.
