= Vividh Bharati =

Indian radio station

- India
- Broadcast area: India; Worldwide

Links
- Website: www.prasarbharati.gov.in

The Vividh Bharati Service (VBS; lit. 'Diverse Voices') of All India Radio was conceptualized to combat Radio Ceylon in 1967. Due to the Indian Government stopping its short wave relay centers, VBS is only available on the Internet. Vividh Bharati radio channel was launched on 3 October 1957.

All the programmes are produced centrally at Vividh Bharati Service, Borivali, Mumbai and up-linked to the satellite. 40 Vividh Bharati stations across the country down-link these programmes through captive earth stations provided at each of these AIR stations. Some local programme windows are also provided at these stations to give regional flavour to the listeners. Vividh Bharati is also broadcast on DD Direct Plus, the state owned DTH platform. The 40 Vividh Bharati stations are known as Commercial Broadcasting Service Stations and are located at major cities covering 97% of the Indian population.

Over the years, a number prominent people from Hindi cinema have lent their voice to the channel, including Lata Mangeshkar and actors Raaj Kumar and Amitabh Bachchan (who worked as a radio broadcaster in his early career). Celebrities take part in the popular show "Vishesh Jaimala" to encourage the Indian Army and the BSF soldiers. Today its archives which started the record of film, Yehudi Ki Beti in 1933, has 22,000 ghazals, geets and Hindi film songs. The station celebrated its fiftieth anniversary on 2 October 2007.

== History ==
Commercials were introduced initially in the Vividh Bharati Service in 1957 on an experimental basis. Realising the role of advertising in accelerating the social and material progress of the country, commercials were extended to primary channels including FM and local radio stations in a phased manner. Advertising on radio is cost effective to advertisers and has the potential to reach rural areas where other mass media is not as prevalent.

== Content ==
The service provides entertainment for nearly 15 to 17 hours a day. It presents a mix of film music, skits, short plays and interactive programmes. Some of the popular programmes of Vividh Bharati are 'Sangeet Sarita', 'Bhule Bisre Geet', Hawa Mahal, 'Jaimala', 'Inse Miliye', and 'Chhaya Geet'. New programmes like 'Bioscope Ke Batein', 'Sargam Ke Sitare', 'Celluloid Ke Sitare', 'Sehatnama', 'Hello Farmaish', 'Sakhi Saheli' and 'Aaj Ke Phankaar' were gradually introduced.

== See also ==
- Radio Kashmir
