= AIR FM Gold =

- India
- Broadcast area: India

Programming
- Format: Adult Contemporary

Ownership
- Owner: All India Radio
- Sister stations: AIR FM Rainbow

History
- First air date: 1 September 2001

AIR FM Gold is an FM radio channel in Mumbai, Delhi, Kolkata and Chennai, India. It is run by the All India Radio, a government owned enterprise, a division of Prasar Bharati. In Mumbai, it features Hindi songs, and English songs along with hourly news in English and Hindi. It operates on 1188 MW in Mumbai and on 106.4 Megahertz in Delhi. It was started on 15 August 2001 by the then Minister of Information & Broadcasting.

== History ==
Late Indivar Sacdeva, Rajiv Saxena and Naveen K. Gupta were some of the broadcasters who were involved with devising the channel's content and presentation style when it was started in September 2001. At that time this channel was just called FM-2. Later on Danish Iqbal and Vijay Deepak Chhiber were Programme Executives of this channel. FM-1 was the previous channel which is now known as FM Rainbow. Anil Baijal, then CEO of Prasar Bharti wanted to call this as FM Classic but FM-2 name became popular by default. The inaugural show was hosted by Sujata Rath, Senior Announcer. Programs like Gaate Gungunate, Arpan and Dopaher FM were part of the initial repertoire. Another notable feature of the early days was the daily broadcast of Helpline series where various kinds of counselling was provided involving notable experts of different fields. In those days this channel used to be of 18 hours only, now it is a 24 hours channel.

== Channels ==
All stations are also available online

=== FM Gold Delhi ===
AIR FM Gold Delhi
- Delhi; India
- Broadcast area: India
- Frequency: 100.1 MHz
- Branding: "Akashvani FM Gold - Khara Sona"

Programming
- Language: Hindi
- Format: Adult Contemporary

Ownership
- Owner: All India Radio
- Operator: AIR Delhi

Technical information
- Power: 20 KW

Links
- Webcast: https://www.vividhbharti.org/air-fm-gold/

AIR FM Gold Delhi is a radio channel broadcast from AIR Delhi. This channel is dedicated to old Bollywood songs. It also broadcasts programs on current affairs from News Service Division of AIR.

=== FM Gold Mumbai ===
AIR FM Gold Mumbai
- Mumbai; India
- Broadcast area: Maharashtra
- Frequency: 100.1 MHz
- Branding: "Akashvani FM Gold - One O O Point One Karat - Khara Sona"

Programming
- Languages: Hindi, Marathi & Gujarati
- Format: Adult Contemporary

Ownership
- Owner: All India Radio
- Operator: AIR Mumbai

History
- Former frequencies: 100.7 MHz

Technical information
- Power: 20 KW

=== FM Gold Kolkata ===
AIR FM Gold Kolkata
- Kolkata; India
- Broadcast area: West Bengal
- Frequency: 100.1 MHz

Programming
- Languages: Bengali, Hindi & English
- Format: Adult Contemporary

Ownership
- Owner: All India Radio
- Operator: AIR Kolkata

Technical information
- Power: 20 KW

=== FM Gold Chennai ===
AIR FM Gold Chennai
- Chennai; India
- Broadcast area: Tamil Nadu
- Frequency: 100.1 MHz

Programming
- Languages: Tamil, English & Hindi
- Format: Adult Contemporary

Ownership
- Owner: All India Radio
- Operator: AIR Chennai

Technical information
- Power: 20 KW

== Programs ==
FM Rainbow, formerly FM-1, is a metro channel using "Hinglish" which broadcasts a mix of Hindi film music and western pop music. It was initially designed to broadcast only classics of music, drama and literature. Another speciality of that period were the daily phone-in counselling shows involving educational, psychiatric, legal, marriage, home decor, interior decoration, hobbies like music, painting, photography, dance and many more subjects. FM Rainbow became very popular among discerning audience within a short time due to its eclectic programming and old Hindi songs. According to recent surveys its morning, evening and late night shows are more popular than any other channel. It is the only channel which has News and Current Affairs in its programming. In Chennai, it broadcasts Tamil songs and occasional English songs with news in English and Tamil operating in 102.3 MHz. In Delhi it operates in Hindi playing older songs with news/special reports commentary and its frequency is 106.40 MHz. It also airs live commentary for Indian sports.

== News Bulletins ==
The then Information and Broadcasting Minister launched a news and entertainment channel called AIR FM-II (now FM Gold) on 1 September 2001. The channel is on air 24/7. It is a composite blend of information and entertainment with one third of its contents devoted to news and current affairs. Composite news programs in Hindi and English originating from Delhi are exclusively broadcast every morning, midday and evening for a duration of 30 minutes each. These include 'Samachar Prabhat', 'Dopahar Samachar' in Hindi and 'Breakfast News' in English in the morning and 'Samachar Sandhya' in Hindi in the evening and 'News at 9' at 9 p.m. The channel has also some specialized programs like 'Market Mantra' (business magazine) and 'Sports Scan' (sports related programme). Other news-based programs mounted on FM Gold include 'Vaad Samvaad' and 'Countrywide' based on interviews with prominent personalities. It also broadcasts news at every hour.

Hourly news headlines are broadcast on FM Gold in Hindi & English alternately, these are 5 min long. Other than this following programs are broadcast by NSD on FM Gold.

Time	Bulletin	Duration	Day	Language	Content
07.30 am	Aaj Savere	30 min	Daily	Hindi & English	News Based Program
08.00 am	Samachar Prabhat	30 min	Daily	Hindi	News Bulletin
08.30 am	Morning News	30 min	Daily	English	News Bulletin
02.00 pm	Midday News	30 min	Daily	English	News Bulletin
02.30 pm	Dopahar Samachar	30 min	Daily	Hindi	News Bulletin
04.30 pm	Parikrama	30 min	Daily	Hindi & English	News Based Program
06.30 pm	Market Mantra	30 min	Daily	Hindi & English	News Based Program
08.30 pm	Sports Scan	15 min	Daily	Hindi & English	News Based Program
08.00 pm	Samachar Sandhya	30 min	Daily	Hindi	News Bulletin
09.00 pm	News at 9	15 min	Daily	English	News Bulletin
09.15 pm	Spotlight / News Analysis	15 min	Daily	English	News Based Program
09.30 pm	Public Speak	35 min	Monday	Hindi & English	News Based Program
	Money Talk	15 min	Tuesday	English	News Based Program
	Charcha Ka Vishai Hai	30 min	Wednesday	Hindi	News Based Program
	Country Wide	15 min	Thursday	English	News Based Program
	Current Affairs	30 min	Friday	English	News Based Program
09.30 pm	Vaad-Samvaad	30 min	Tuesday	Hindi	News Based Program
	Surkhiyon Mein	15 min	Thursday	Hindi	News Based Program
