= 92.7 Big FM =

Indian national radio station

92.7 BIG FM
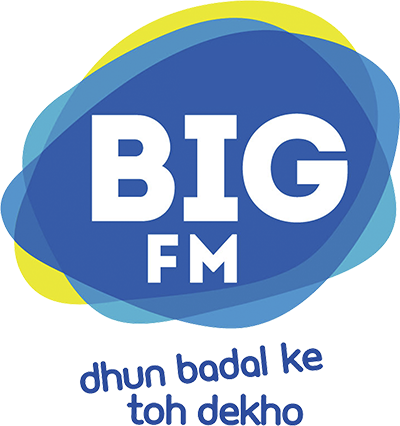
- India
- Frequency: 92.7 MHz

Ownership
- Owner: Sapphire Media Group

History
- First air date: September 2006

Links
- Website: www.bigfmindia.com//

BIG FM is one of India’s largest radio networks that broadcasts primarily at 92.7 MHz. It is part of Sapphire Media Group with 58 stations reaching about 1.9K towns and covering 1.2 lakh villages in the country. It is accessible to over 34 crore Indians across the country. BIG FM holds key properties such as Suhaana Safar with Annu Kapoor and Yaadon Ka Idiot Box with Neelesh Misra. In January 2019, BIG FM relaunched with a new philosophy and positioning statement - "Dhun Badal Ke Toh Dekho" (transl. Just try changing the tune). The biggest radio show - Dhun Badal Ke Toh Dekho Season 1 was launched with Vidya Balan as the host followed by a successful Season 2 with Sadhguru and Season 3 with Pankaj Tripathi.

== History ==
BIG FM first aired in September 2006 with the tag line as Suno Sunao Life Banao. BIG FM renewed its positioning in 2019 with the tag line ‘Dhun Badal Ke Toh Dekho’ which reflects the philosophy that ‘Changing the world for the better starts with changing your thoughts’. The brand anthem was sung by Sonu Nigam. Realigning the programming to reflect the new positioning, BIG FM refreshed the music promise playing your favourite music tested with the audience besides bringing on board some big names from the Radio and entertainment space across all key markets. In 2024, BIG FM presented a revamped avatar, unveiling an exciting new rendition of its iconic brand song, sung by Sushant Divgikar.

== Recent expansions ==
The radio network has already made significant inroads in digital audio storytelling, with many key properties being made available in podcast format across various audio streaming platforms. It has further strengthened its partnerships with a dedicated focus on regional languages as well. Recently, BIG FM announced the launch of its a one-stop digital platform- Big Live, offering curated, credible and culturally-relevant content. Aligned with the brand's core purpose of "Enriching Everyday Life", Big Live delivers content across a wide range of verticals such as real estate, automobile, entertainment, travel, food, fashion, finance, technology and jewellery. With its tagline of ‘Fuel Your Life’, it serves as a catalyst for transformation—empowering users with insightful content that informs, enriches, and adds tangible value to their daily lives.

== Areas of operation ==
- 58 Stations

East	West	North 1	North 2	South	New stations
Asansol	Baroda	Amritsar	Agra	Bangalore	Nagpur
Bhubaneswar	Bhopal	Chandigarh	Ajmer	Chennai	Aurangabad
Guwahati	Goa	Hisar	Aligarh	Hyderabad	Kolhapur
Jamshedpur	Gwalior	Jalandhar	Allahabad	Mangalore	Ahmednagar
Kolkata	Indore	Jammu	Bareilly	Mysore	Gorakhpur
Ranchi	Mumbai	Patiala	Bikaner	Pondicherry	Lucknow
Rourkela	Rajkot	Shimla	Delhi	Tirupati	Varanasi
	Solapur	Srinagar	Jhansi	Trivandrum	Patna
	Surat		Jodhpur		Muzaffarpur
			Kanpur		Itanagar
			Kota		Aizawl
			Udaipur		Agartala
					Shillong
					Pune

- 24 States covered
- 34 crore population covered
- 19 languages

== Awards ==
BIG FM's original content-based shows and engaging brand-led campaigns have consistently won accolades at prestigious industry awards like the Indian Radio Forum & New York Festival, EMVIES, ABBYs, Asian Customer Engagement Awards, e4m Golden Mikes, India Audio Summit and Awards. Recently, BIG FM won the 'Radio Station of the Year' award at ACEF Global Customer Engagement Awards 2025. To list a few -

- 45 Awards at e4m Golden Mikes 2025
- 39 Awards at ACEF Awards 2025
- 14 Awards at India Audio Summit and Awards 2025
- 10 Golds at IRF 2019
- 8 Awards at IRF 2018
- 9 Awards at ABBYs 2017 (in partnership with Mindshare and Maxus)
- 6 Awards at NYF Radio Awards 2014
