= AIR FM Rainbow =

- India

Programming
- Languages: Hindi, English, regional
- Format: Hot adult contemporary

Ownership
- Owner: All India Radio
- Sister stations: AIR FM Gold

History
- First air date: 1 February 1993

AIR FM Rainbow is a group of FM radio channels across India. The group of stations was previously called FM Metro, but the name was changed to FM Rainbow in 2002. The group is run by All India Radio, or AIR, a government owned enterprise. It features Hindi and regional language songs, while also playing English music and providing hourly news in English, regional language and/or Hindi. In Bhopal, FM Rainbow broadcasts in Hindi to more than 12 districts of Madhya Pradesh and 21 Bhopal City suburbs. AIR FM Rainbow Delhi airs in as many as ten cities, more than any of the other FM Rainbow frequencies. Mumbai, Lucknow, Vizag,Chennai, Hyderabad, Vijayawada, Kakinada, Kochi and Bangalore all receive FM Rainbow transmissions on a variety of frequencies.

Rainbow stations are widely accessible due not only to their strong FM signals that carry transmissions to numerous villages in addition to urban areas, but also to FM Rainbow's commitment to providing diverse programming. Rainbow FM stations plays ghazals, soundtracks, and a variety of programs featuring Western music, both popular music and classical music. Some such programs are "Time Out," "Take Off," "Footloose," and "Wicked Hour." FM Rainbow's variety of programming is unique for an Indian radio station, yet almost all the disc jockeys (locally known as "radio jockeys," or RJs) on private Indian FM stations got their start at FM Rainbow. Programming is provided on a rotating schedule, accessible from the All India Radio website, along with the frequencies available in different regions. FM Rainbow channels are also available to tune in from Prasar Bharati DTH channels across the country for listeners outside the bandwidth.

== History ==
AIR launched the FM Rainbow channel on 01.02.1993. This was a channel to cater primarily to the young listener on the move. The presentation style became fast-paced and informal to suit the changing listener profile. The vibrant programming and quality reception caught the imagination of the young and allured them to come closer to their radio. In its round the clock broadcast, radio listeners were served with a varied menu of new formats of entertainment.

At present AIR has 206 FM transmitters across the country, by which it covers 24.94% of the area and 36.81% of the population of the country. FM Rainbow is originated from 17 centers, at Delhi, Mumbai, Chennai, Kolkata, Bangalore-Kannada Kamanabilu, Lucknow, Panaji, Jalandhar, Cuttack, Kodaikanal, Tiruchirapalli, Coimbatore, Vishakhapatnam, Puducherry, Vijayawada, Goa and Tirunelveli. AIR Delhi Rainbow is relayed fully from Mussorie, Kanpur, Aligarh, Kasauli, Kurseong, Leh, Aurangabad, Kochi and Shillong (Akashvani FM Jong Phi) and partly from Hyderabad, Bhadrava, Poonch, Rajauri, Naushera, RK Srinagar, RK Jammu, Jhansi, Dharamshala, and Bhatinda. The programming of FM Rainbow includes Pop music, Film songs, Classical & Devotional music, News Headlines, informal chat shows, phone-in programmes etc. AIR FM Rainbow commands an extensive listening and holds its own among private FM Channels.

AIR FM RAINBOW Stations/Relay Centres
City	State/UT	Frequency (MHz)
Aligarh	Uttar Pradesh	101.3
Aurangabad	Bihar	102.4
Bathinda	Punjab	101.1
Bengaluru	Karnataka	101.3
Bhaderwah	Jammu and Kashmir	101.0
Chennai	Tamil Nadu	101.4
Coimbatore	Tamil Nadu	103.0
Cuttack	Odisha	101.3
Delhi	Delhi	102.6
Dharamshala	Himachal Pradesh	103.4
Hyderabad	Telangana	101.9
Jalandhar	Punjab	102.7
Jammu	Jammu and Kashmir	100.3
Jhansi	Uttar Pradesh	103.0
Kanpur	Uttar Pradesh	102.2
Kasauli	Himachal Pradesh	107.2
Kochi	Kerala	107.5
Kodaikanal	Tamil Nadu	100.5
Kolkata	West Bengal	107.0
Kurseong	West Bengal	102.3
Leh	Ladakh	1053 kHz
Lucknow	Uttar Pradesh	100.7
Mumbai	Maharashtra	107.1
Mussoorie	Uttarakhand	102.1
Nowshera	Jammu and Kashmir	1089 kHz
Panaji	Goa	105.4
Poonch	Jammu and Kashmir	100.7
Rajouri	Jammu and Kashmir	101.9
Shillong*	Meghalaya	103.6
Srinagar	Jammu and Kashmir	102.6
Tiruchirapalli	Tamil Nadu	102.1
Vijayawada	Andhra Pradesh	102.2
Visakhapatnam	Andhra Pradesh	102.0

*Since Saturday, the 2nd of October, 2010, Akashvani FM Rainbow Shillong, which relays to Akashvani FM Rainbow Delhi, became Akashvani FM Jong Phi and is a full fledged radio station, broadcasting its own programmes since that date.

The channel currently also runs in top 25 countries which includes European countries France, Switzerland, Finland, Netherlands and Germany, neighbouring countries like Pakistan, Bangladesh and Nepal to West Asian countries Israel, Saudi Arabia, UAE, Qatar, Bahrain, Kuwait and Oman.

== News bulletins on FM ‘Rainbow’ channel ==
The News Services Division is putting out news headlines on FM ‘Rainbow’ channel from Delhi from 28 May 1995. Twenty four news headline bulletins on FM ‘Rainbow’ are broadcast round-the-clock from Delhi. The duration of each headline FM ‘Rainbow’ bulletin from Delhi is one minute approx. At present 22 AIR stations are broadcasting FM Headlines.

== FM Rainbow India ==
AIR FM Rainbow India
- Delhi; India
- Broadcast area: India
- Frequency: 102.6 MHz FM / 1368 kHz S2 MW DRM30
- Branding: Akashvani FM Rainbow - Musically Yours

Programming
- Languages: Hindi & English
- Format: Hot Adult Contemporary

Ownership
- Owner: All India Radio
- Operator: AIR Delhi

History
- Former call signs: AIR FM Rainbow Delhi

AIR FM Rainbow India was formerly known as AIR FM Rainbow Delhi. It was rebranded with new look targeting audience of not only Delhi but also entire India. It also changed its programming pattern & presentation also.

Main genres of programmes are Bollywood music and Western music. It airs total 4 hours of Western music. Besides this it airs Music shows, Request shows, Interviews & Information programmes in Hindi with Filmi Music. AIR FM Rainbow India Headlines are broadcast every hour at starting of programme according to its language i.e. Hindi or English.

After rebranded as AIR FM Rainbow India, it started a new programme called Good Morning India which airs at 07:00 am to 09:00 am. It includes News, Interviews, Health, Programme Summary with upbeat Filmi Music targeting all Indian audiences.

=== Programmes ===
==== Hindi ====
- Good Morning India 7:00am(tue) RJs Satya and Chitra
- Hotline 10:00am
- Bollywood trails 11:00am(mon-sat) rj nikhil barma
- Aashiyana 1:00pm(tue)RJ Tapasaya
- On Air Mehmaan rj santosh rao 10am
- Bindass Bol (Friday)3:00pm rj priti mohan
- Helpline(mon-fri) rj bharti dang 3.00pm rajshree trivedi
- Parwaaz Hai Kaam Tera 4:00pm
- Citylights 5:00pm
- Message Masala Mix 7:00pm (sun-thurs)RJ Sujata
- Party time 8:00pm
- Aradhana

==== English ====
- Play It Cool
- Matchless Music Hour
- Breakfree
