= Radio City (Indian radio station) =

Indian radio station

- India

Ownership
- Owner: Music Broadcast Limited, a subsidiary of Jagran Prakashan Limited

History
- First air date: 3 July 2001

Links
- Website: radiocity.in

Radio City is India's first private FM radio station and was started on 3 July 2001 by Star TV Network. It broadcasts on 91.1 (earlier 91.0 in most cities) megahertz from Bengaluru (started first in 2001), Mumbai (where it was started in 2003), Lucknow and New Delhi (since 2003). It plays Hindi, English and regional songs. It was launched in Hyderabad in March 2006, in Chennai on 7 July 2006 and in Visakhapatnam October 2007. Radio City forayed into new media in May 2008 with the launch of a music portal - PlanetRadiocity.com now radiocity.in that offers entertainment related news, videos, songs, podcasts and other music-related features. The Radio station currently plays a mix of music from various languages. In 2010, Radio City launched its first internet radio station Radio City Fun Ka Antenna and now they have 18 online radio stations.

== Frequencies ==
Radio City operates in the following cities:

- Agra, UP (broadcast on 91.9 MHz)
- Ahmedabad, GJ
- Ahmednagar, MH
- Ajmer, RJ (broadcast on 104.8 MHz)
- Akola, MH
- Bangalore, KA
- Bareilly, UP (broadcast on 91.9 MHz)
- Bikaner, RJ
- Chennai, TN
- Coimbatore, TN
- Delhi
- Gorakhpur, UP (broadcast on 91.9 MHz)
- Hisar, HR (broadcast on 91.9 MHz)
- Hyderabad, TS
- Jaipur, RJ
- Jalandhar, PB (broadcast on 91.9 MHz)
- Jalgaon, MH
- Jamshedpur, JH
- Karnal, HR (broadcast on 91.9 MHz)
- Kanpur, UP (broadcast on 104.8 MHz)
- Kota, RJ
- Kolhapur, MH (broadcast on 95 MHz)
- Lucknow, UP
- Madurai, TN (broadcast on 91.9 MHz)
- Mumbai, MH
- Nagpur, MH
- Nanded, MH
- Nashik, MH (broadcast on 95 MHz)
- Patna, BR
- Patiala, PB
- Pune, MH
- Ranchi, JH (broadcast on 91.9 MHz)
- Sangli, MH
- Solapur, MH
- Surat, GJ
- Udaipur, RJ (broadcast on 91.9 MHz)
- Varanasi, UP (broadcast on 91.9 MHz)
- Vadodara, GJ
- Vijayawada, AP
- Visakhapatnam, AP

Unless specified otherwise, all stations broadcast on 91.1 MHz.

== Radio City Super Singer ==
Radio City Super Singer is a singing talent hunt by Radio City to discover the singing talent among its listeners. It was launched in 2011 in 14 cities - Mumbai, Bengaluru, Chennai, Delhi, Hyderabad, Jaipur, Lucknow, Nagpur, Surat, Vadodara, Ahmedabad, Visakhapatnam, Coimbatore and Pune.

== Radio City School of Broadcasting ==
Radio City School of Broadcasting (RCSB) is an autonomous educational unit, instituted by Music Broadcast Limited (MBL) which owns and operates Radio City 91.1FM. It was launched on 3 February 2009. They offer a 6-month Certificate Course in Radio Jockeying and Radio Production.

== Recognitions ==
Awards	Category
India's Best Companies to Work for Study ‘14	India's Best Company to work For 2014 - Rank 1 in Media
India's Best Companies to Work for Study ‘14	Engaging Frontline Staff -Rank 2
India's Best Companies to Work for Study ‘14	Rewards & Recognition -Rank 3
India's Best Companies to Work for Study ‘14	Fairness in Performance Management System- Rank 3

== Acquisition by Jagran Group ==
On 16 December 2014, media group Jagran Prakashan Limited (JPL) announced acquisition of Music Broadcast Ltd, which operates the Radio City FM stations from Indian Private Equity firm True North (Formerly known as India Value Fund Advisor). Music Broadcast Ltd publicly listed its shares on 17 March 2017. The shares listed at a 26% premium above its issue price of Rs. 333/-.

== Radio City Freedom Awards ==
Radio City Freedom Awards are a set of awards presented annually to recognize and honor independent music across genres like Hip-Hop, Folk Fusion, Pop, Rock, Metal and Electronica. It is an open competition that is not restricted to any specific language or region. Its aim is to promote fresh talent and encourage diverse music genres across the globe. The first Radio City Freedom Awards was held on 30 May 2013 in Mumbai. The jury for the awards consisted of Atul Churamani, MIDIval Punditz, Luke Kenny, Yotam Agam & Nandini Srikar.
