= International mass media of South Korea =

International mass media of South Korea includes newspapers, television broadcasts, and radio broadcasts.

== Broadcasting ==
=== TV networks ===
- Arirang TV

Arirang TV is an international TV broadcast channel based in South Korea. As of December 2023, It is broadcasting to about 146 million households worldwide through eight satellites.

- KBS WORLD TV

KBS WORLD TV is a 24-hour entertainment channel operated by the Korean public broadcaster KBS. The channel is broadcast in Korean language with multilingual subtitles. It is available to 140 million households in 142 countries.

=== Radio networks ===
- Arirang Radio

Arirang Radio provides Korean culture, K-pop, tourism, and tips on living in South Korea.

- KBS WORLD Radio

KBS World Radio opened in 1953 as South Korea's first English radio station for foreigners residing in Korea under the name of "Voice of Free Korea." The station broadcasts news and programs in 11 languages, including Korean and English, Chinese, Japanese, Indonesian, Arabic, Vietnamese, Russian, German, French, and Spanish.

== Newspapers ==
- The Korea Herald

The Korea Herald is an English-language newspaper that distributes South Korean-related content to more than 80 countries around the world.

- Korea JoongAng Daily

Korea JoongAng Daily has been publishing print editions of the two newspapers in cooperation with the New York Times since 2000.

- The Korea Times

The Korea Times published its first issue in 1950. The Korea Times publishes 20 pages every day from Monday to Friday.

== Magazine ==
- 10 Magazine

== See also ==
- Mass media in South Korea
- Korea International Broadcasting Foundation
