= Policy for Merger and Abolition of the Press =

1980s South Korean media policy

Policy for Merger and Abolition of the Press (Korean: 언론통폐합; Hanja: 言論統廢合) is a South Korean policy implemented by president Chun Doo-hwan in November 1980 to limit the freedom of press.

== Development ==
In 1979, through the December 12th coup, Chun Doo-hwan rose to power and censored all press releases based on martial law. In February 1980, Chun newly installed a press unit in the Defense Security Command. In the press unit, an attempt to lure journalists by the K-press work plan was and tried to make the press make editorials that looked at democracy activism in a negative light. These attempts continued until late August 1980. The Defense Security Command and the Korean Central Intelligence Agency did the pre work for the policy based on information about the journalists and the press, justifying it as a recovery of impartiality and public values.

On November 11, 1980, the new military government decided that the measure was needed to suppress expected protests after the lift of martial law. Heo Moon-do and others drafted the plan for the betterment of press, which was implemented by the Defense Security Command on November 12 in the same year after Chun's approval. Then, the Defense Security Command from 6 pm on the same day, the owners of broadcasting companies were summoned to forcefully sign a memorandum to show they have no objections.

Based on Chun's orders, the Korean Broadcasting Association and newspaper association opened a committee and announced a statement that had a reform of the Korean press for a healthy press as the main content. As a result, newspapers in the capital was reduced from 7 to 6, and regional newspapers were also reduced from 14 to 10. Yonhap News Agency was born as a result of hapdong news agency and Tongyang News Agency (or alternately translated as Orient Press).

In broadcasting, Korean Broadcasting System merged and acquired privately owned stations, such as Tongyang Broadcasting Company (a predecessor of JTBC), Dong-A Broadcasting System (a predecessor of Channel A), Jeonil Broadcasting Corporation, Seohae Broadcasting Corporation and Hanguk-FM and forced to buy 65% of the shares of Munhwa Broadcasting Corporation and became the largest press outlet in South Korea, and Munhwa Broadcasting Corporation legally became a public company. Christian Broadcasting System, who was received as a contributing network in terms of democracy activism, ceased being a news agency and became a religious radio network. Only 26 broadcasting stations were left, including Asea Broadcasting Agency.
