= KBS World (Indonesian TV channel) =

- KBS World logo
- Country: Indonesia
- Broadcast area: Malaysia; Indonesia
- Headquarters: Jakarta, Indonesia

Programming
- Languages: Korean with English and Indonesian subtitle
- Picture format: 720p/1080i (HDTV)

Ownership
- Owner: Korean Broadcasting System; OKTN (Overseas Korean Television Network)
- Sister channels: KBS America; KBS World Japan; KBS World Arabia

History
- Launched: September 2007

Links
- Website: kbsworld.kbs.co.kr

KBS World is an Indonesian television channel owned by the Korean Broadcasting System and operated by Overseas Korean Television Network (OKTN), a subsidiary of Korindo Group. The station's target audience consists of Koreans in Indonesia, as well as Indonesian audience interested in Korean entertainment. The channel was Launched in September 2007 at Palapa C2 satellite. In 2010, it moved to Telkom 1, where it still remains. It shared the same schedule from the KBS World global feed, but with different advertisements and selected exclusive program which is available to Indonesian viewers.

KBS World stopped channel service through Indovision (now MNC Vision) due to the expiration of Channel Distribution Agreement as of 31 July 2016.
