= MBC America =

American television channel

- Country: United States
- Broadcast area: North and South America
- Headquarters: Los Angeles, California

Programming
- Language: Korean

Ownership
- Owner: Munhwa Broadcasting Corporation

History
- Launched: March 20, 1991

Links
- Website: http://mbc-america.com/

Availability

Terrestrial
- Over-the-air: See the table below

MBC America (MBC 아메리카) is an American television channel operated by the U.S. subsidiary of the Munhwa Broadcasting Corporation, targeting Koreans in North and South America. Launched on March 20, 1991, it runs a broadcasting schedule separate from MBC World in South Korea.

A Canadian variant of this version, broadcast across Canada, is operated by All TV Inc.

== History ==
The company was established in 1991. In 1998, it started inserting commercials locally, then in 1999, began distributing programs to The International Channel, including MBC Newsdesk. A 24-hour satellite feed started broadcasting in 2000.

Over-the-air digital broadcasts started in 2004. One of the first stations to pick up the network was KBCB in Seattle On August 1, 2005, the company stopped distributing videos to video stores; instead, adopting a direct sales method from its Los Angeles offices. In April 2006, the channel was added to DirecTV, with the launch of its KoreanDirect package. This enabled the channel to be broadcast nationwide. On October 23, 2007, MBC America started distributing its catalog of Spanish-dubbed dramas to Spanish-language stations in the New York and Los Angeles metro areas.

On August 1, 2008, regular over-the-air broadcasts started under the MBC-D brand. The new network carried the 2008 Summer Olympic Games in Korean. Initially limited to Los Angeles and New York, its reach expanded to San Francisco on March 16, 2009, on KTSF's multiplex. Broadcasts to U-verse subscribers started on March 22, 2009.

On November 8, 2011, it signed a contract with Oyang America to bring GS Home Shopping to the United States, airing on the network from November 18.

In 2015, MBC America had tensions with Arirang TV, whose broadcasting status in the United States lapsed the previous year. IPAA, a broadcasting organization established by Koreans in Los Angeles, denounced MBC America and Arirang for receiving all documents to take part in the broadcasting sector. Employees of both networks traded accusations.

In 2017, MBC America was facing difficulties due to a scandal involving its previous CEO Yoon Dong-yeol, who, according to employees, caused "ridiculous drama". He accused director Hong Sang-won of sexual harassment and sent the information to the parent facilities in Seoul.

As of April 2025, terrestrial distribution of MBC DTV is limited to six stations in California.
