= KBS World (TV channel) =

South Korean television channel

- Country: South Korea
- Broadcast area: International
- Network: Korean Broadcasting System
- Headquarters: Content Business Department,13, Yeouido-dong, Yeongdeungpo-gu, Seoul

Programming
- Language(s): Korean (with multiple language subtitles)
- Picture format: 1080i (HDTV)

Ownership
- Owner: Korean Broadcasting System
- Sister channels: KBS1; KBS2

History
- Launched: 1 July 2003

Links
- Website: kbsworld.kbs.co.kr

KBS World is a South Korean pay television channel operated by the Korean Broadcasting System aimed at international audiences outside South Korea. It was launched on 1 July 2003 and mainly broadcast in Korean, but subtitles in English, Chinese and Malay are also provided.

Apart from the signals from Seoul, there are three separate services operated by KBS's subsidiaries for specific market: the Japanese version of KBS World, operated by KBS Japan, targets Japanese audiences, the Indonesian version of KBS World, operated by OKTN, targets Indonesian audiences, while the American version of KBS World, operated by KBS America, targets Koreans in North and South America.

== History ==
KBS announced in June 2003 that KBS World was set to launch on July 1. The initial aim of the service was to target the Korean diaspora, by reducing the nostalgia of the Koreans for their homeland. 79% of the programming was pre-recorded and the remaining 21% was live, including news and original productions for the network, I Love Korean and KBS World Hanminjok Plaza.

The second anniversary was marked with TV in the World, KBS World, about the influence of the Korean Wave around the world, with Winter Sonata producer Yoon Seok-ho and actress Chae Shi-ra. The documentary presented segments about growing interest for Korean culture, from a 16-year old in Uzbekistan who started learning Korean from a drama and a teacher in Germany who taught Korean to Germans. On December 19, 2005, KBS World News Today, a 15-minute news bulletin in English, started airing on weekdays.

The channel in 2006 struggled to enter the mainland Chinese market, receiving rejections from the regulator. The negotiations started in September 2003; as of September 2006, no contract had been signed between the two countries. For KBS, the Chinese market had potential, with 4 million ethnic Koreans and 200,000 Korean immigrants living at the time. The push in 2006 came after CCTV-9's carriage in Korea was agreed upon in August, while KBS's goals were to deliver peace and cultural stability in the Northeast Asian region. On October 2, 2006, the channel was made available on StarHub TV beginning with a free preview on channel 100.

For the week of its sixth anniversary in 2009, the channel aired the eight-episode historical miniseries Conspiracy in the Court and cultural documentaries.

The channel converted to high definition on September 3, 2012. In July 2013, for the tenth anniversary, among the plans issued by the corporation were the advancement in non-Anglophone markets, such as Latin America and Africa, but considering satellite transmission and dubbing costs, government funding was required. KBS World designated July 6, 2013 as World Hallyu Day, with a special edition of Music Bank airing on July 5. After an agreement signed with Orange's IPTV service in France in August 2013, the number of families watching the channel in Europe had exceeded 10 million.

== Programming ==
Programs on KBS World are sourced among the domestic KBS1 and KBS2 services, and include a broad schedule of programming, including news, dramas, and formerly documentaries and children's programming. Broadcasts mostly in Korean, it also shows an English language news bulletin, KBS World News Today. Series licensed to other broadcasters and other streaming services outside South Korea, such as Netflix and Disney+, are covered up with alternate programming if required.

== Sister channels ==
KBS World also operates KBS Korea, which airs Korean news, current affairs, talk shows, documentaries and culturally-oriented programming for overseas Koreans.

== Internet ==
KBS World TV also provides live streaming services on its official YouTube channel. Alongside streaming its main feed, it also streams World 24, and maintains a library of past programs to watch on demand with most available via closed captioning in English and other languages. Opened in 2015, the World TV feed became available online in North America and other countries, particularly those without strict copyright regulations.

On 12 March 2018, KBS World TV's YouTube channel temporarily stopped the World TV online stream to these areas, citing the channel's internal problems. Since July 2021, the Korea feed is now available for streaming.

== See also ==
- Korean Broadcasting System
- KBS World Radio
- KBS America
- Arirang TV
- Arirang Radio
