= KBS World =

South Korean international broadcaster

- Country: South Korea
- Broadcast area: International
- Network: Korean Broadcasting System
- Headquarters: Content Business Department,13, Yeouido-dong, Yeongdeungpo-gu, Seoul

Programming
- Language: Korean (with multiple language subtitles)
- Picture format: 1080i (HDTV)

Ownership
- Owner: Korean Broadcasting System
- Sister channels: KBS1; KBS2

History
- Launched: 1 July 2003

Links
- Website: world.kbs.co.kr

KBS World (Korean: KBS 월드) is the international broadcasting division of the South Korean broadcast television network Korean Broadcasting System. The division operates KBS World, KBS World Radio, and KBS Korea.

== History ==
The foreign-language radio broadcast from KBS (before its restructure into a public broadcaster in March 1973) was started as "The Voice of Free Korea" in 1953. It officially became a part of KBS in July 1968. The station was renamed Radio Korea in March 1973, and then Radio Korea International in August 1994.

In July 2003, KBS World, an international television channel aimed at Koreans abroad, started broadcasting. In March 2005, Radio Korea International became KBS World Radio. Most of the programs are subtitled for the audience they are broadcast to, in languages such as English, Chinese, Malay, Vietnamese, and Indonesian.

== Services ==
=== Radio ===
KBS World Radio is South Korea's sole foreign language promotional broadcast for the entire world. Its programming features news, culture, music, entertainment, as well as Korean lessons.

KBS World Radio currently broadcasts in Korean, English, Japanese, French, Russian, Mandarin, Spanish, Indonesian, Arabic, German, Vietnamese and Cantonese.

=== Television ===
Former KBS World logo used from 2003 to 2009.

KBS World's TV programming is sourced from KBS's domestic television services, with older drama series aired in the case where latest drama series has sold to other licensors outside South Korea, such as Netflix, Amazon Prime Video, Disney+ and even (for Southeast Asia, Middle East and South Africa) Viu or (for all other markets) Viki/Kocowa. It mainly broadcast in Korean, but subtitles in English, Malay and Chinese are also provided.

There are four separate general entertainment KBS World services operated by KBS's subsidiaries tailored to specific markets: the Japanese version of KBS World, operated by KBS Japan, targets Japanese audiences, the Indonesian version of KBS World, operated by OKTN, targets Indonesian audiences, while KBS America (in English) and KBS Latino (in Spanish, Portuguese) target audiences in North and South America such as Mexico and Brazil.

Additionally, KBS World 24 was a news and documentary channel that was available for free online. On July 1, 2021, the channel was rebrand as KBS Korea, focusing on Korean programming from KBS1, mainly on News and Culture, tailored for Overseas Koreans.
