= Jeonil Broadcasting Corporation =

1971–1980 radio station in South Korea

The Jeonil Broadcasting Corporation (Korean: 전일방송; Hanja: 全日放送), also known as Voice of Chonil, from which the VOC abbreviation came, was a commercial radio station that existed in Gwangju. The station, founded in 1971, broadcast on 1220 kHz before moving to 1224 kHz in 1978. It closed in 1980 and integrated into the Korean Broadcasting System.

== History ==
VOC received its preliminary license on 10 December 1970, using the HLAA call sign. It started regular broadcasts on 24 April 1971. Although it was technically a TBC affiliate, Jeonnam Ilbo helped assist in its creation, while TBC supplied the station with programming direct from Seoul.

VOC was also specialized in the broadcast of local youth baseball matches. Kim Dong-yeop, who later worked for Haitai Tigers, began his media career as a baseball commentator.

VOC was caught in the epicenter of anti-dictatorship protests which erupted in Gwangju in May 1980. Martial Law forces forcibly censored the script used for the 6pm news program, removing all references to the 18 May incidents.

Affected by the Policy for Merger and Abolition of the Press, the government announced the shutdown of VOC on 1 November 1980. After 3507 days on air, the station shut down at the end of 30 November 1980, with the closing words being "We hope that God's protection will forever be with your family". Its staff moved to KBS.

In February 2017, about 20 staff members from the former VOC were gathered to share their memories of the May 1980 incidents, marking the first time a gathering of surviving VOC members happened since the station's closure. Artists who took part in the VOC University Song Festival when it was held between 1978 and 1980 had a reunion on 14 December 2023.
