= KNTV (Japanese TV channel) =

Japanese television channel

KNTV, an abbreviation of its former name Korea Now TV, is a Japanese cable and satellite television channel delivering content from the two Korean commercial networks, MBC and SBS. The channel is owned by, and is the main asset of, Stream Media Corporation, a Japanese company which specializes primarily in the distribution of Korean audiovisual content to the Japanese market.

== History ==
The channel started broadcasting on October 1, 1996 on the PerfecTV! (now SKY PerfecTV!) satellite platform and delivered its service for a 21-hour period (6am to 3am). Its initial owner was Korea Satellite Broadcasting/Telework and operated under the commercial name KN Television. Programming was initially provided by terrestrial networks KBS (which in 2006 launched a localized version of KBS World) and MBC and cable networks YTN, HBS, KMTV and Q Channel. For this end, KDD and Korea Telecom signed a joint agreement to rebroadcast YTN's news bulletins on the channel. In 1998 it began producing Zainichi Korean News. Still in the same year, it signed an agreement to air programs from MBN, when it was a business channel.

In 2012, KNTV was taken to court because of a dispute with KBS over the Japanese distribution rights for You Are the Best!, for which the channel had reportedly gained exclusive rights since before production started. On October 18, Min Byeong-Ho became its president.

In addition to its broadcast of Korean drama series and variety shows, KNTV also collaborates with the Korean Cultural Center. Original programming over time included news on Korean celebrities as well as Korean language lessons and holding special events with Korean drama stars. The channel also airs the year-end awards of the two partner networks.

In recent years (as early as 2020), KNTV started airing dramas from cable networks.
