= Channel A (TV channel) =

South Korean TV channel

- Country: South Korea
- Broadcast area: South Korea; Worldwide (via internet)
- Headquarters: Dong-A Media Center; 1 Cheonggyecheon-ro, Jongno-gu, Seoul, South Korea

Programming
- Picture format: 1080i (HDTV)

Ownership
- Owner: Dong-A Media Group
- Parent: The Dong-A Ilbo
- Key people: Kim Cha-soo (CEO)

History
- Launched: December 1, 2011
- Replaced: Power A

Links
- Website: iChannelA.com/

Channel A Corporation (Korean: 주식회사 채널에이; Hanja: 株式會社 채널에이), known as Channel A (채널A, typeset CHANNEL A), is a national generalist cable TV network and broadcasting company in South Korea. The company's largest shareholder is Dong-A Media Group (DAMG), which consists of 12 affiliate companies including The Dong-a Ilbo. Channel A was launched on 1 December 2011. Channel A's management philosophy is 'Open & Creative' and the company slogan is 'Channel A, A Canvas that Holds Your Dreams.' JaeHo Kim is the chief executive officer.

Channel A is one of four newly launched South Korea nationwide generalist cable TV networks alongside JoongAng Ilbo's JTBC, Chosun Ilbo's TV Chosun and Maeil Kyungje's MBN in 2011. The four new networks supplement existing conventional free-to-air TV networks like KBS, MBC, SBS, and other smaller channels launched following deregulation in 1990.

== History ==
=== 1963–1980: Dong-A Broadcasting Station (radio) ===
The origin of the network can be traced back to the 1960s when its predecessor Dong-A Broadcasting System (DBS, 동아방송) was established on April 25, 1963.

DBS' first ever radio drama show and South Korea's first docudrama, Yeomyeong 80 Years, aired every night (between 22:15 and 22:35). Since broadcasters at the time were only airing melodramas and soap operas, Yeomyeong 80 Years was a radical debut of a new drama genre in South Korean radio history. It stopped airing in 1964 and during the same year, the show was made into a six-book novel series and received the Hankook Ilbo Publishing Award. Delightful Livingroom, DBS' oldest radio show, was a talk show where different guests visited the set ("livingroom") and talk about different topics in a humorous, sarcastic, and satirical manner. This show is also considered as South Korea's first talk show on neither TV or radio.

DBS' music programme, Top Tune Show was the harbinger of radio Disc Jockey genre in South Korea. Other stations' music shows at the time were employing professional announcers as their presenters and the producers of the show would do the audio mixing separately. However, Top Tune Show first employed an integrated system where a single music-knowledgeable producer do everything from mixing, presenting to adding commentaries. Following Top Tune Show's popularity, similar music-genre programmes such as 'Dial at 3pm' and 'Dial at 0 hour' debuted. In these programmes, there was a common segment called the 'Request Corner.' In this segment, listeners will call in to request their desired song to be played live and this was possible due to DBS retaining a comparably large music library with more than 2000 world music records.

DBS' What do you think? is the world's first "town meeting" program which started in 1965. It was a live debate show dealing with different political and economic issues. This show was an extremely radical program considering the oppressive military regime at the time when freedom of press was severely restricted. Furthermore, Hyun-Doo Kang, Seoul National University's honorary professor and former professor of journalism commented, "DBS will be recorded as the most brave station in the history of broadcasting."

In 1966, DBS was able to live broadcast the 37th Dong-A Marathon and this was the first time to live broadcast a full marathon race in South Korean radio history. Furthermore, in 1964, DBS was the first broadcaster in South Korea to build a satellite studio in Midopa Department Store in Myeongdong.

In 1976, DBS Monday through Tuesday radio drama Pretty Boy Got the number one spot with 97.3%, achieving an all-kill against MBC's Nationwide News 8, KBS's Evening News and TBC's FM Latest Inkigayo on its time slot. No other radio program has broken this record until now. In November 1980, DBS permanently discontinued airing due to the government's mandatory merger decision and was integrated with Korean Broadcasting System. On December 25, 1980, Dong-A Broadcasting Station closed due to the mandatory merger to the Korean Broadcasting System by the military government forces resulting in the launching of KBS Radio Seoul. In 1991, Dong-A Broadcasting Station's Frequency of 792 kHz is transferred to Seoul Broadcasting System. On January 1, 2000, Construction completion of Dong-A Media Center. On July 22, 2009, Amendment of Media law passed the national assembly to deregulate the media market of South Korea.

=== 2011–present: Broadcasting of Channel A and DBS ===
On December 31, 2010, JTBC, TV Chosun, MBN, and Channel A are selected as "General Cable Television Channel Broadcasters".

On December 1, 2011, Channel A begins broadcasting.

On December 7, 2011, Construction on the Dong-A Digital Media Center (DDMC) begins.

On March 2, 2012, STORY NETWORKS is established.

In 2012, Channel A broadcasts the Golden Lion Pennant National High School Baseball Championship hosted by The Dong-a Ilbo.

On October 17, 2014, Construction completed on the Dong-A Digital Media Center (DDMC).

On July 1, 2015, Channel A Plus begins broadcasting.

On March 17, 2016, Channel A broadcasts the Seoul International Marathon hosted by The Dong-a Ilbo.

On December 26, 2016, Channel A B&C and Channel A Newsvision are established.

On January 26, 2018, The 30,000th edition of the Dong-A Ilbo Directive was published.

On February 20, 2019, the Korea Journalists Association awards Dong-A Ilbo the 'Korea Journalists Award' for reporting on former Minister Cho Kuk's personnel verification.

On November 27, 2019, in the Korea Communications Commission's 2018 broadcast evaluation, Channel A was ranked first with the highest score among general programming channels.

On April 1, 2020, Dong-A IIbo celebrates its 100th anniversary.

== Programs ==
=== Current programs ===
Day	Title
Monday	Super DNA, blood can't be fooled
Tuesday	Rich in ordinary people
Tuesday	Kidnap Game
Thursday	Body God
Thursday	The Fishermen and the City 3
Thursday	Stars Awakening
Friday	My Golden Kids
Friday	Watch Dr. Oh's Golden Clinic
Saturday	Doomed Marriage
Sunday	Now on My Way to Meet You

=== Past programs ===
==== Dramas ====
- K-Pop Extreme Survival
- Happy And
- Goodbye My Wife
- Miss Panda and Mr. Hedgehog
- Color of Woman
- An Immortal Work
- Heaven's Garden
- Bachelor's Vegetable Store
- Twelve Nights
- Coffee, Do Me a Favor
- Love Affairs in The Afternoon
- Touch
- Eccentric! Chef Moon
- Lie After Lie
- Show Window: The Queen's House
- Queen of Masks
- Between Him and Her
- Cinderella at 2 AM
- Marry You
- Check-in Hanyang
- The Witch
- Positively Yours
- Dive into You

==== Reality & Entertainment ====
- Never Too Late for College
- Dog Papa
- Angry Wife
- The Farmer's Men
- MISAGO
- National Team
- Gentleman
- Top Magic
- Right Now
- 24 Hours Observation Camera
- Singderella
- Mystical Tales of the Royals
- Ordinary Millionaire
- The South Meets the North
- Lookalikes
- X-File, The Food Story
- Heart Signal Season 1
- Heart Signal Season 2

==== Documentaries ====
- Exodus, Out of North Korea
- Greenland

== X-File, The Food Story's Good-Natured Restaurant ==
Channel A's X-File, The Food Story, which began broadcasting on February 10, 2012, is an investigative crime TV show that deeply delves into the Korean food system and reports on restaurants' wrongdoings. Moreover, the staff of the show travelled around the country to locate restaurants that provide fresh and delicious food handled properly and safely and bestowed "Good-Natured Restaurant" title to these restaurants. These "Good-Natured Restaurants" became extremely popular and a huge hype.

In 2013, the viewers of the show suggested to the producers to reverify these restaurants and the producers agreed to this suggestion. For more rational and objective results, a new investigation group was formed, which consisted of 15 people with various different occupations such as college student, food columnist, culinary arts professor, and housewives. The investigation group visited each of the restaurants in the "Good-Natured Restaurant" list and went through a thorough inspection processes.

== Affiliates ==
=== Newspaper affiliations ===
Kyeongin Ilbo, Kangwon Ilbo, Daejeon Ilbo, Kwangju Ilbo, Jeonbuk Ilbo, Maeil Ilbo, Busan Ilbo, Kyeongnam News, Jeju Ilbo

== Awards and nominations ==
Date	Program	Award	Presenter
Jan 2012 – Mar 2014	Channel A	Ranked No. 1 in Viewer Satisfaction Index (General Cable TV Networks)	Korea Information Society Development Institute
Jun 29, 2012	Documentary Special: Open Your Eyes to Africa	Best Program of the Month (April 2014)	Korea Communications Standards Commission (KCSC)
July 25, 2012	Now on My Way to Meet You	Clean Content Award	The Clean Contents Movement
Sept 6, 2012	Together, We Go Far	Nanum Press Prize	Hyundai 1% Oil Bank Foundation
Sept 28, 2012	Now on My Way to Meet You	Broadcast for Unification Award	10 Million Separated Families Association
Nov 6, 2012	Greenland	13th KIPA Best Picture Award	Independent Production Association
Nov 14, 2012	Now on My Way to Meet You	Honored by the Ministry of Unification	Ministry of Unification
Nov 28, 2012	A Week in Chingma	Best Program of the Month (September 2012)	KCSC
Mar 5, 2013	Candidacy Report on Young-Jun Kim	Best Journalist Report Award of the Month (January 2013)	KCSC
Mar 27, 2013	Exodus Out of North Korea	Best Program of the Month (January 2013)	KCSC
Apr 9, 2013	Now on My Way to Meet You	Soh Jaipil Cultural Press Award	Soh Jaipil Commemoration
Mar 25, 2014	X-File, The Food Story	Best Program of the Month	Korea Communications Standards Commission
Apr 13, 2014	Exodus Out of North Korea	World-Fest Houston Platinum Remi Award	WorldFest-Houston International Film Festival
May 24, 2016	Ordinary Millionaire	Best Program of the Month	KCSC
Jun 16, 2016	Channel A Station ID	Promotion Marketing & Design Global Excellence Award in Art Direction & Design Division	Promax Awards

== See also ==
- MBC Standard FM
- MBC TV
- SBS TV
