= Seohae Broadcasting Corporation =

1969–1980 radio station in South Korea

The Seohae Broadcasting Corporation (Korean: 서해방송; Hanja: 西海放送) was a local radio station in South Korea broadcasting in Gunsan, North Jeolla Province. Operational from 1969 to 1980, the station broadcast on 680 kHz, moving to 675 kHz as a result of the Geneva Frequency Plan of 1975. It shut down as part of a government measure to reduce the number of media outlets, after an attempted coup in Gwangju in May of that year.

== History ==
The company received the permit to operate on 24 December 1968, named its executives in February the following year, made its test broadcasts on 28 August 1969 and started broadcasting on 2 October 1969. The station used the HLAS callsign.

Seohae Broadcasting had a strong regional policy, with its main goals being community development and provision of information for farmers and fishermen. However, like other local radio stations at the time, it was suffering from economic downturns and forged a partnership with the Tongyang Broadcasting Company ahead of its regular launch, on 19 September 1969.

Before its closure was announced, SBC was in a desperate situation. The Policy for Merger and Abolition of the Press enforced in November 1980 led to a massive reduction of media outlets from 1 December. SBC was one of the affected stations, being sold to the Korean Broadcasting System at a relatively low price. SBC was replaced by the KBS Gunsan Broadcasting Station, whose frequency was later used for KBS Radio 3's regional service. In 1987, KBS vacated the old SBC building, which was later used by the Jeonbuk Savings Bank.
