= Korea International Broadcasting Foundation =

South Korean private international broadcaster

Korea International Broadcasting Foundation (Arirang)
- Type: Cable television network
- Country: South Korea
- Headquarters: Seocho-dong, Seocho District, Seoul, South Korea

Programming
- Picture format: MPEG4 1080i

Ownership
- Owner: KEPCO KDN: 21.43% Korea Ginseng Corporation: 19.95% Mirae Asset Life Insurance: 14.98% Korea Racing Authority: 9.52% Woori Bank: 7.40%
- Key people: Kim Tae-Jeong (CEO)

History
- Launched: 10 April 1996; 29 years ago (cable)

Links
- Website: www.arirang.com (in Korean)

The Korea International Broadcasting Foundation (KIBF; Korean: 한국국제방송교류재단) is a South Korean non-profit organization established to promote interest in Korea. The foundation operates Arirang TV and Arirang Radio.

The foundation's offerings compete with KBS World (owned by state-owned broadcaster KBS) which also broadcasts Korean content overseas.

== History ==
The foundation was established on April 10, 1996, and began domestic broadcasting in 1997. Overseas broadcasting commenced in the Asia-Pacific region in 1999, and broadcasts to Europe, North Africa, and the Americas started in 2000. In 2003, the foundation established Arirang FM. Jeju is an English-language FM radio station in South Korea. Arabic language broadcasting commenced in 2004. In 2015, Arirang launched a channel on the UN's in-house broadcast network.

In May 2020, Arirang TV signed a memorandum of understanding with The Korea Times.

== See also ==
- Arirang TV
- Arirang Radio
