= KSCI =

Television station in Long Beach, California

- Long Beach–Los Angeles, California; United States
- City: Long Beach, California (Note: Originally licensed to San Bernardino, California; moved to Long Beach in 1998.)
- Channels: Digital: 18 (UHF), shared with KOCE-TV; Virtual: 18
- Branding: LA 18

Programming
- Affiliations: 18.1: Shop LC; for others, see § Subchannels

Ownership
- Owner: WRNN-TV Associates; (RNN National, LLC)

History
- First air date: June 30, 1977
- Former channel numbers: Analog: 18 (UHF, 1977–2009); Digital: 61 (UHF, until 2009)
- Former affiliations: FNN (1981–1985); Multicultural independent (1985–2021); ShopHQ (2021–2023)
- Call sign meaning: "Science of Creative Intelligence"

Technical information
- Licensing authority: FCC
- Facility ID: 35608
- ERP: 1,000 kW
- HAAT: 892 m (2,927 ft)
- Transmitter coordinates: 34°13′25.78″N 118°3′47.91″W

Links
- Public license information: Public file; LMS

KSCI (channel 18) is a television station licensed to Long Beach, California, United States, serving the Los Angeles area. Owned by WRNN-TV Associates, the station airs programming from home shopping network Shop LC. KSCI's studios are located on South Bundy Drive in West Los Angeles, and its transmitter is located atop Mount Wilson. KSCI served as a multicultural independent station until June 2021.

== History ==
=== 1970s ===
The channel 18 allocation in Los Angeles was previously occupied by KCHU-TV, licensed to San Bernardino, which signed on the air on August 1, 1962, before it went off the air in June 1964. The station was owned by the San Bernardino Sun-Telegram. KSCI signed on the air on June 30, 1977, operating from studios in West Los Angeles, although still licensed in San Bernardino. It became a non-profit owned by the Transcendental Meditation movement (the call letters stood for Maharishi Mahesh Yogi's theoretical "Science of Creative Intelligence"). The station broadcast news stories, prerecorded lectures and variety shows with TM celebrities. KSCI's goal was to report "only good news"; sister stations were planned for San Francisco and Washington, D.C. The station manager was Mark Fleischer, son of Hollywood director Richard Fleischer.

=== 1980s ===
In 1980, KSCI switched to a for-profit operation and earned $1 million on revenues of $8 million in 1985. In November 1985, the station loaned $350,000 to Maharishi International University in Iowa. By June 1986, the station's content began to consist of "a hodgepodge of programming" in 14 languages. They had dubbed themselves the "international station" and claimed to offer the most diverse ethnic television programming in the early 1980s. Almost all Iranian American television programs in the early 1980s were on KSCI.

In October 1986, the station was purchased by its general manager and an investor for $40.5 million.

=== 1990s ===
In 1990, the station was sold to Intercontinental Television Group Inc., with programming being produced by Wahid Boctor of Arab American Television. In 1998, KSCI transferred its city of license from San Bernardino to Long Beach. In 2000, a Korean newspaper, The Hankook Ilbo, took over the International Media Group (IMG), which operated KSCI. IMG was re-launched as the AsianMedia Group, Inc., who purchased the station.

=== 2000s ===
By 2005, the station was broadcasting seven English-language and three Spanish-language newscasts plus "local news programs in Vietnamese, Mandarin Chinese, and Korean" to 2.5 million Asian-American viewers in Southern California. In early 2005, KSCI changed its on-air branding to "LA18".

In October 2008, KSCI broadcast the Presidential debate along with translation in Mandarin and offered political analysis by their news staff. The broadcast was one of several that covered election events in Korean, Mandarin, Cantonese, Vietnamese and Filipino languages.

=== 2010s–present ===
On January 9, 2012, KSCI, Inc. filed a voluntary petition for reorganization under Chapter 11 bankruptcy protection to the U.S. Bankruptcy Court for the District of Delaware. On August 11, 2012, KSCI was purchased by NRJ TV LLC, a company which has acquired smaller television stations in various U.S. cities for the possibility of placing their spectrum for auction once the Federal Communications Commission rolls out a voluntary spectrum auction for use for non-broadcast purposes in 2014.

On June 22, 2017, KSCI announced that they had canceled all of its programming in Chinese, Filipino, Spanish, and Armenian and replaced it with English-language infomercials beginning July 1. The subchannels of the station continued to air its programs in Chinese and Armenian, but as a result of the station's programming cutbacks, KSCI also announced they reduced its Korean programming from 8 to 11 p.m. and would cut its subchannels list from 12 to 5 the following year.

On September 12, 2017, KSCI's parent company NRJ TV LLC announced that they would sell its Poway translator station, KUAN-LD, to the NBC Owned Television Stations group (owners of KNBC/KVEA and KNSD), for $650,000; the sale was completed on December 21, 2017.

==== Sale to RNN ====
On December 9, 2019, it was announced that WRNN-TV Associates, owner of New York City–based WRNN-TV, secured a deal to purchase seven full-power TV stations (including KSCI) and one Class A station from NRJ. The sale was approved by the FCC on January 23, and was completed on February 4, 2020.

From February 1 until February 4, 2020, WRNN-TV Associates operated KSCI under a short-term local marketing agreement (LMA) while it awaited full consummation of its purchase. KSCI began airing WRNN-TV's independent network RNN on its primary channel. RNN's schedule consists primarily of infomercials, with occasional religious, E/I, and news/talk programs.

On May 30, 2021, it was announced that KSCI (along with its sister stations owned by WRNN-TV Associates) would become an affiliate of the ShopHQ 24/7 channel on June 28, 2021.

iMedia Brands filed for Chapter 11 bankruptcy on June 28, 2023. On July 10, 2023, iMedia announced that it would sell its assets, including ShopHQ, to RNN Media Group for $50 million; the deal was terminated in August in favor of a $55 million bid for ShopHQ by IV Brands, owned by Manoj Bhargava. In October 2023, KSCI switched to Shop LC.

== Technical information ==
=== Subchannels ===
Subchannels of KSCI and KOCE-TV
License	Subchannel	Res.	Short name	Programming
KSCI	18.1	720p	LA18	Shop LC
KSCI	18.2	480i	SBS	SBS (Korean)
KSCI	18.3	480i	MBCD	MBC-D (Korean)
KSCI	18.4	480i	YTV	Yonhap News TV (Korean news)
KOCE-TV	50.1	1080i	PBS-HD	PBS
KOCE-TV	50.2	480i	PBS-2	PBS SoCal Encore
KOCE-TV	50.3	480i	Daystar	Daystar
KOCE-TV	50.4	480i	PBSwrld	World
KOCE-TV	50.5	480i	PBSkids	PBS Kids

=== Analog-to-digital conversion ===
KSCI shut down its analog signal, over UHF channel 18, on June 12, 2009, as part of the federally mandated transition from analog to digital television. The station's digital signal relocated from its pre-transition UHF channel 61, which was among the high band UHF channels (52-69) that were removed from broadcasting use as a result of the transition, to its former analog-era UHF channel 18.
