= Eun Mihee =

South Korean novelist

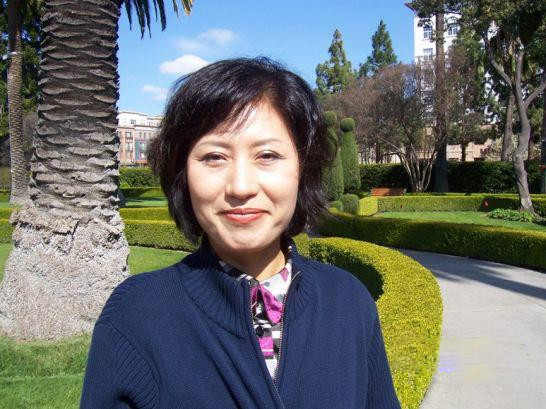
- Eun in 2008; photograph by Il Chun Lee.
- Born: 20 September 1960 (age 66); Mokpo, South Jeolla Province, South Korea
- Education: Gwangju University
- Occupations: Novelist, essayist, college lecturer, columnist
- Spouse: Single
- Writing career
- Notable works: People in Columbarium; Minority's Love; Song of the Wind; Ten Thousand and Two Brewing Women; The First Experience at 18; Flutter, Flutter, Butterfly

- Korean name
- Hangul: 은미희
- Hanja: 殷美姬
- RR: Eun Mihui
- MR: Ŭn Mihŭi

Eun Mihee (Korean: 은미희; born on September 20, 1960) is a South Korean novelist, writer, columnist, and a college lecturer. She was born in Mokpo, South Jeolla Province in southern South Korea and moved to Gwangju at 3 years old and grew up there. She was a radio actress at Munhwa Broadcasting Corporation in Gwangju in her early 20s and became a journalist at Jeonnam Maeil newspaper later. While working as a journalist, she realized that she really wanted to be a novelist. She started her work as a novelist and she won first prize the Jeonnam Ilbo Literature Award for the short novel What Kind of Silkworm's Dream in Cocoon in 1996. After that, she won the Munhwa Ilbo Literature Award in 1999 for another short novel: Bird Fly Again.

She received the Samsung Literature Award in 2001 for People in Columbarium, which is a novel of poor peoples' lives at an inn in a small town. Her novel Minority's Love received a good review. It depicted the unique and serious introspection about life in the shadow of the past as dealing with the dark side of love and life such as love between relatives and the same sex, which were contradicted, and not allowed socially. When she released the Song of the Wind based on interviews with strolling candy-selling entertainers that can be called as modern strolling-actors, she received sincere attention from the media about her literary skill — revealing the people's characters while describing the joys and sorrows of their lives.

Her first collection of short stories, Ten Thousand and Two Brewing Women, received compliments because she expressed the nobility of life in detail through people lead lonely daily lives. Her other her novels are The First Experience at 18, Wind Man Tree Woman, John Paul II, etc.

== Early life ==
Eun was born in a small town as the fourth child and the third daughter of five. Her father was an art teacher at a high school who had three individual exhibitions and several group exhibitions as a member of Hwangto-Group. Mihee had a talent in painting like her father and received awards during elementary and middle school. However, she gave up her dream to be a painter because her father did not want her to be an artist.

She started to develop her writing skill when she was in high school and received an award in a national writing contest. She got admission to Seokang Technology Institute but needed to drop out. Her oldest sister attended a graduate school and her older sister studied at an art college, so her family was not able to support her financially. In May 1980, she experienced serious panic condition when watching the Gwangju Democratization People's Uprising. Many innocent people's deaths and violence done by soldiers made her look at life as vain.

== Career ==
Eun enrolled at Korea National Open University. She got a job at Gwangju Munhwa Broadcasting Co. the following year, but she was not satisfied with it. At the age of 30, she decided to concentrate on writing a novel. Six years later, she received the Jeonnam Ilbo Literature Award for her short novel, What Kind of Silkworm's Dream in Cocoon, in 1996 and the Munhwa Ilbo Literature Award in 1999 for another short novel, Bird Fly Again. She turned into a professional novelist. However, she destroyed her award plaques in 2000 and said,

"Plaque is just a souvenir to acknowledge of the birth of a writer. It might sound like presumptuous, but I badly hate the literature and art convert to the score. The writers should filter the stories that the readers can empathy through infinite imagination and experience. The writers should not stay in some limited fence like the stagnant water could be easily rot. Whenever I see the award plaque, it made me lazy since I recognized me as a 'debut writer.' Therefore, I destroyed all the plaques to have a mind of a beginner before debut."

Her debut as a novelist was later than compared to her peer writers. She recalled that her family had a hard time due to her brother's constant business failures. Nevertheless, she mentioned that watching the Gwangju Uprising, experiencing financially hard times, and not receiving enough education gave her nourishment for life. When she decided to continue her study, she enrolled at Gwangju University in 1999 and got a master's degree from the school in 2010. After that, she started a Ph.D. course at Korean Teacher Department at Dongshin University in 2016. She has pursued her degree and has taught creative writing at Saengoji University and screenwriting at the department of Broadcasting Entertainment at Dongshin University.

== Written works ==
- 1996, short story What Kind of Silkworm's Dream in Cocoon: 누에는 고치 속에서 무슨 꿈을 꾸는가 Jeonnam Ilbo Literature Award
- 1999, short story Bird Fly Again: 다시 나는 새 Munwha Ilbo Literature Award
- 2001, novel People in Columbarium: 비둘기집사람들
- 2002, novel Minority's Love: 소수의 사랑
- 2005, novel Song of the Wind: 바람의 노래,
- 2005, biography Chosun Genius Painter Seungeop Jang: 조선의 천재 화가 장승업
- 2006, short story book Ten thousand and two brewing Women: 만두 빚는 여자,
- 2006, collaborated Audio book: Snack
- 2006, novel The First Experience at 18: 18세, 첫경험,
- 2006, short story I lost myself: 나를 잃다 (Munjang Webzine January 2007)
- 2007, novel Wind male tree woman: 바람남자 나무여자,
- 2007, biography Goddess of Creation and Destruction — Camille Claudel: 창조와 파괴의 여신 카미유 클로델
- 2008, short story A Landscape with a Blue Mold: 푸른 곰팡이가 있는 풍경 (Writer open tomorrow 52, winter)
- 2008, collaborated 2 and 1/2: 2와 2분의 1
- 2008, picture book Shimchung Fell in Indangsu: 인당수에 빠진 심청
- 2009, novel Butterfly, Butterfly: 나비야 나비야
- 2010, picture book Introducing my Friend Butterfly: 내 친구 나비를 소개합니다
- 2010, collaborated Thank You, Family: 가족, 당신이 고맙습니다
- 2010, collaborated Class: All This Makes the Lost Memories
- 2011, novel The First Experience at 18: Chinese version 18岁的初体验
- 2011, novel Black Skirt Sadako (Jeongja Bae): 흑치마 사다코(배정자)
- 2012, collaborated Giddy Chatters of Eves: 이브들의 아찔한 수다
- 2012, biography Pope John Paul II – The Light of the Human Race: 인류의 빛 교황 요한 바오로 2세
- 2017, novel Flutter, Flutter, Butterfly: Age 15. Abused by thousands of soldiers – Based on a True Story

== Broadcasting works ==
- Narration: SBS 5.18 28 Anniversary Special 2-part series – <Destiny - 80518>(18 May 2008),
- Guest: SBS Field report- people world 230 – <Gwangju Diary of the Yellow Rose> (18 May 2005)
- Host: Park JongSam Production – <1. How I Started Writing “Flutter Flutter Butterfly”> (Oct 1, 2016)
- Host: Park JongSam Production – <2. The Recurrent Questions I Had Writing the Book> (Sep 30, 2016)
- Host: Park JongSam Production – <3. The Main Contents and Plot of the Book> (Sep 30, 2016)
- Host: Park JongSam Production – <4. The Lives of the Victimized Women: After the Lives as “Comfort Women”> (Sep 30, 2016)
- Host: Park JongSam Production – <5. The Things We Have to Keep on Dreaming About”> (Sep 30, 2016)

== Columns ==
- Accompanied with Mihee Eun (2017년~ ), column in Segye Ilbo
- Window of mind (2016~ ), column in Kunsulkyunggae Sinmun
- Live and think (2 January 2015 ~ 26 June 2015), column in Munwha Ilbo
- Blue square (30 June 2006 ~ 7 June 2012), column in Munwha Ilbo
- Mihee Eun's go out (2009 ~ 2011), column in Koomin Ilbo
- Front essay in Lady Kyunghyang, June 2009
- Columnist in Jeonnam Ilbo
- Mihee Eun's Gwangju Walk, column in Gwangju Sibo

== Awards ==
- 1995, Korea Women's Literature Award
- 1996, Gwangnam Literature Award
- 2001, Samsung Literature Award
