= KBS America =

American television channel

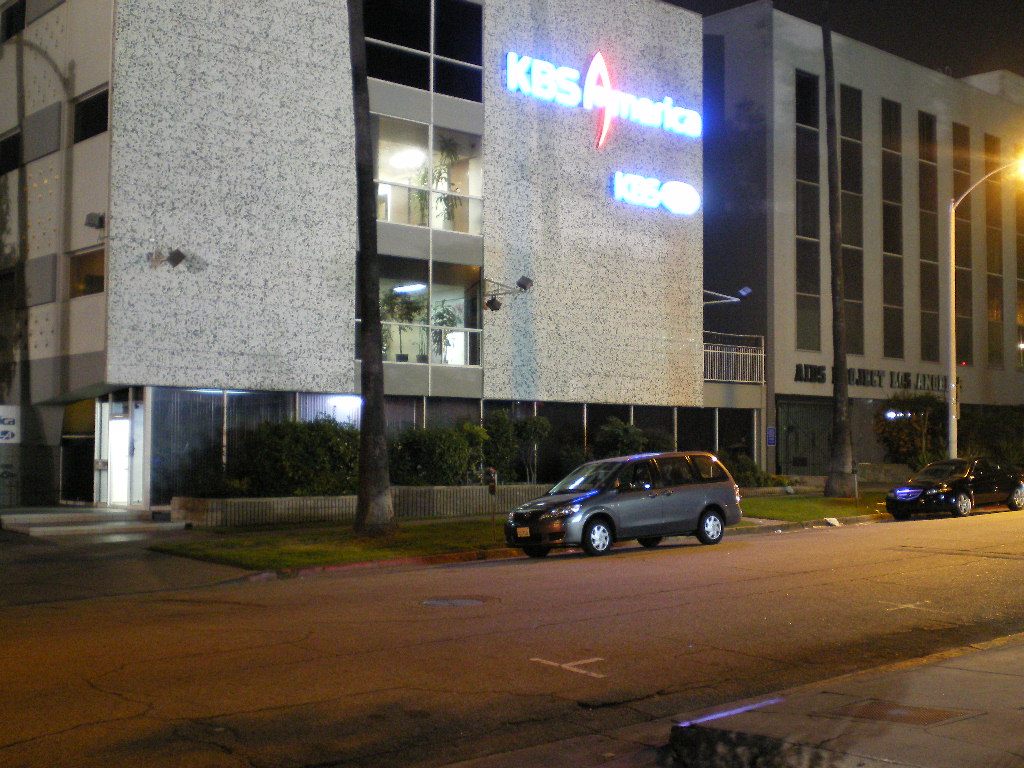
- Country: United States
- Broadcast area: North and South America
- Network: KBS World
- Headquarters: Los Angeles, California

Programming
- Language: Korean

Ownership
- Owner: Korean Broadcasting System

History
- Launched: October 6, 2005

Links
- Website: http://kbs-america.com/

Availability

Terrestrial
- Over-the-air: See the table below

KBS America (KBS 아메리카) is an American television channel operated by the U.S. subsidiary of the Korean Broadcasting System, targeting Koreans in North and South America. Launched on October 6, 2005, it runs a broadcasting schedule separate from KBS World in South Korea.

A Canadian variant of this version, broadcast across Canada, is operated by All TV Inc.

== History ==
KBS America started broadcasting on September 6, 2004, on cable operators in areas with high Korean populations, in Los Angeles, New York, Seattle, Atlanta and Washington. It was expected that the channel was set to convert to a 24-hour service by 2005.

== Broadcast availability ==
=== Digital broadcast ===
City	Station	Virtual channel
Atlanta	WANN-CD	32.7
Chicago	WOCK-CD	13.2
Honolulu	KBFD-DT	32.2
Los Angeles	KXLA	44.1 (Part Time/Secondary)
San Francisco	KICU-TV	36.2
Dallas	KLEG-CD	44.2
