= Arirang Radio =

English-language radio station in South Korea

- South Korea
- Frequencies: 88.7 MHz (Jeju); 88.1 MHz (Seogwipo); 101.9 MHz (Daejeong)

Programming
- Language: English

Ownership
- Owner: Korea International Broadcasting Foundation

History
- First air date: 1 September 2003; 22 years ago

Links
- Website: www.arirang.com/radio

Arirang Radio (Korean: 아리랑 라디오), also stylized as arirang, is an English-language South Korean television and radio network based in Seoul and aimed at an overseas audience. It is operated by the Korea International Broadcasting Foundation and is receives financial support from the Ministry of Culture, Sports and Tourism. The channel, which airs in more than 103 countries, aims to offer an extensive and informative view of affairs on the Korean Peninsula, as well as global issues from a broader international perspective.

The channel airs different programming across countries, but generally airs news, cultural programs, educational shows and documentaries. Its flagship news programs feature timely current-affairs stories, in-depth interviews with world experts, and prominent figures.

== History ==
Arirang International Broadcasting Corporation began broadcasting on September 1, 2003. It is operated by the non-profit Korea International Broadcasting Foundation, which was established under Article 32 of the South Korean Civil Code on April 10, 1996. Initially, the channel was available exclusively on cable and satellite television in South Korea and was targeted at foreigners living in or visiting the country.

Arirang International Broadcasting Corporation operates three channels for overseas viewers. Arirang World was established as a satellite television channel in 1999 and is broadcast in English, Chinese, Spanish, Korean, Arabic, Russian, Vietnamese, and Indonesian. Arirang UN was launched in 2015, and is broadcast in English. As of 2018, the channels were broadcast in 103 countries.

== Coverage ==
Arirang International Broadcasting Corporation provides subtitling services in a variety of languages to better engage with overseas viewers (English, Chinese, Spanish, Arabic, Russian, Vietnamese, Indonesian).

== Arirang News ==
Arirang Radio's flagship news program airs seven times daily, including two interview programs, In-Depth and Global Insight. Interviews have figured figures ranging from OECD Secretary General José Ángel Gurría to former NBA star Dennis Rodman.

== See also ==
- KBS World (TV channel)
- KBS World Radio
- Arirang TV
- Television in South Korea
- International mass media of South Korea
