= Heo Cham =

South Korean radio and television presenter and singer (1949–2022)

- 허참
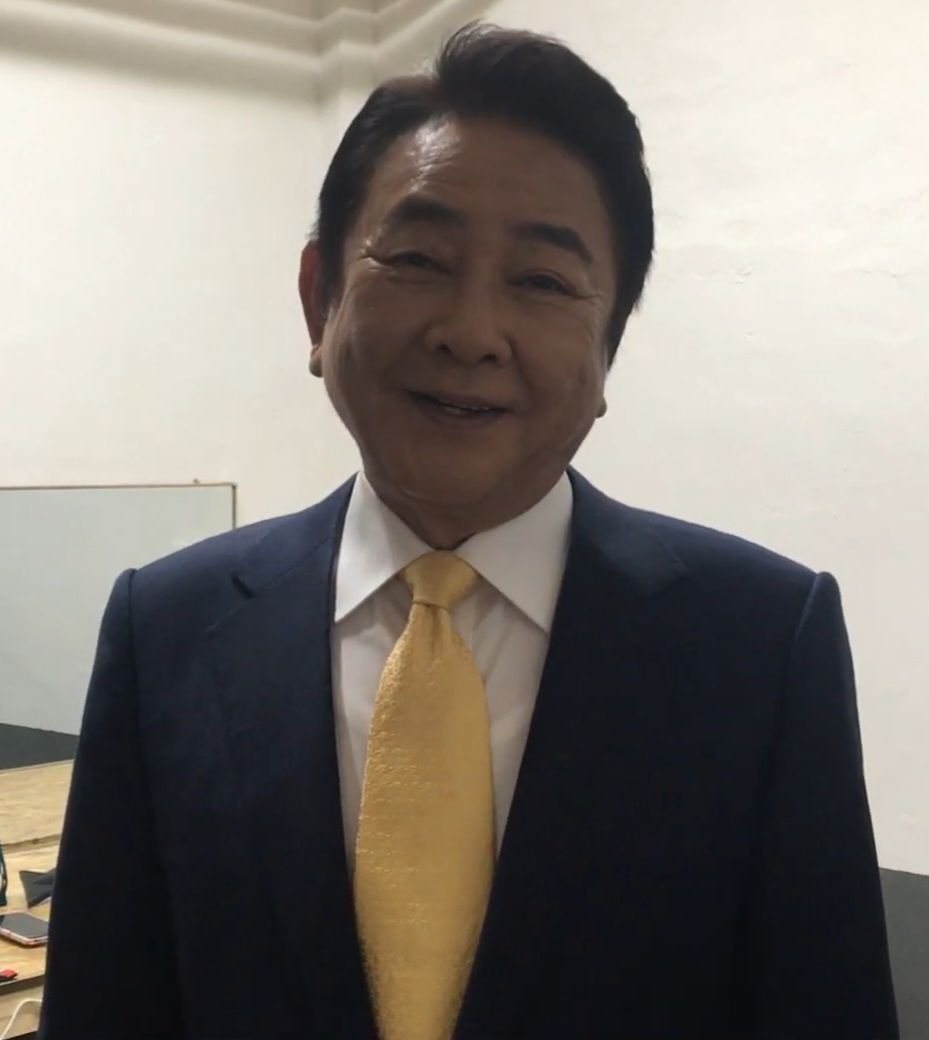
- Born: 30 November 1949; Hwanghae Province, North Korea
- Died: 1 February 2022 (aged 72); Seoul, South Korea
- Occupations: TV and radio host

Heo Cham (Korean: 허참; 30 November 1949 – 1 February 2022) was a South Korean radio and television presenter and singer.

== Life and career ==
Having been born in Hwanghae Province, and moved south over the border shortly after the outbreak of the Korean War, Cham graduated from the Dong-a University in Busan. After working as a master of ceremonies in the music cafe Chelbourg, he made his national television debut in the TBC show Seven Singers Show (7대 가수쇼), and since then he was active as a presenter of a large number of radio and television programs. He was best known as the presenter of the long running KBS1 show Family Arcade (가족오락관), he hosted for 26 years, from its debut in 1984 until its termination in 2009.

During his career Cham received several accolades, including a Career Award at the 2006 KBS Entertainment Awards. Cham was also active as a singer, making his official recording debut in 2003 with the album Chueog-ui yeoja (추억의 여자, "Woman of Memories").

=== Death ===
Cham had successful surgery in 2008 to remove colon cancer. He died from liver cancer in Seoul on 1 February 2022, at the age of 72. He died about 4 months before TV host Song Hae died on 8 June 2022,
