= All TV K =

- All TV K logo
- Country: Canada
- Broadcast area: National
- Headquarters: Toronto, Ontario

Programming
- Picture format: 480i (SDTV)

Ownership
- Owner: All TV
- Sister channels: All TV

History
- Launched: July 2009
- Former names: KBS World (2009-2012)

Links
- Website: All TV K (in Korean)

All TV K is a Canadian exempt Category B Korean language specialty channel with English subtitles and is owned by All TV Inc. It broadcasts programming from KBS World as well as local Canadian content.

All TV K features programming from Korea's public broadcaster KBS. Programming includes news, movies, drama, sports, cultural programmes and documentaries.

== History ==
KBS World, an unrelated channel owned by Seabridge Media, applied for a Category 2 licence in 2004, launched in June 2006. It is currently unclear due to lack of evidence; however, sometime in 2009, Seabridge Media shut down, leading to the closure of KBS World. The licence was revoked on December 2, 2009. Due to the closure of KBS World, All TV Inc stepped in and launched its own version of KBS World in July 2009 on Rogers Cable allowing the service to remain on the air, using its own licence granted by the Canadian Radio-television and Telecommunications Commission (CRTC).

In late 2012, KBS World Canada was renamed All TV K. On July 18, 2013, All TV K was added to Bell Fibe TV.

KBS World logo 2009-2012

== See also ==
- All TV (Canada)
- KBS World
