= Arirang TV =

English-language television network in South Korea

Arirang TV 아리랑 TV

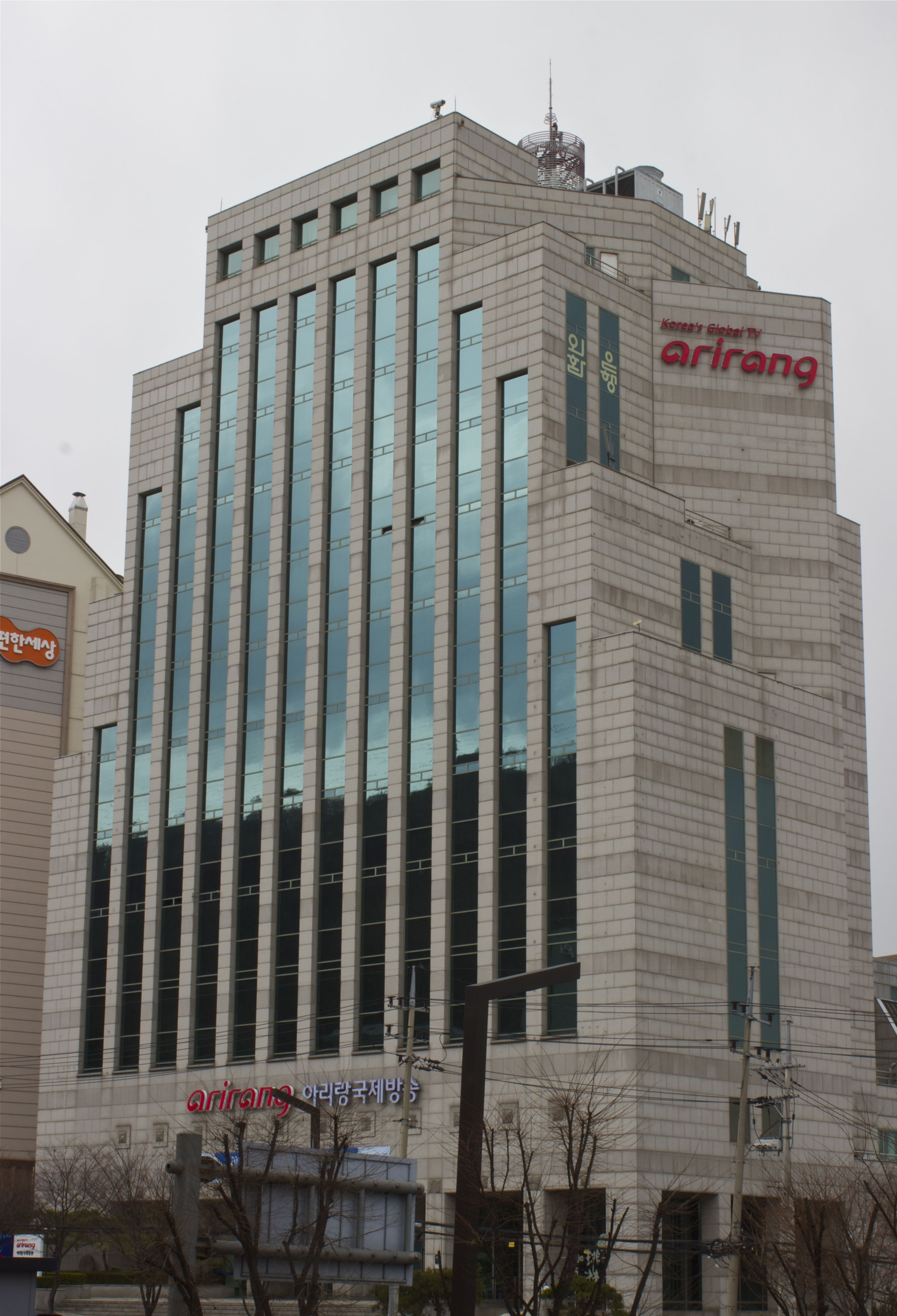
- Arirang Tower, Arirang TV headquarters in Seocho-gu, Seoul, South Korea
- Country: South Korea
- Broadcast area: 134 countries, YouTube Live (Worldwide)
- Headquarters: Seoul, South Korea

Programming
- Language: 8 languages

Ownership
- Owner: Korea International Broadcasting Foundation
- Key people: Kim Tae-jeong (CEO)
- Sister channels: Arirang Radio

History
- Founded: 1996; 30 years ago (Korea International Broadcasting Foundation)
- Launched: 1997; 29 years ago

Links
- Website: arirang.com

Availability

Streaming media
- YouTube: "Live from KOREA | 24/7 Streaming | Arirang TV [아리랑TV] (국제방송교류재단)" on YouTube

Arirang TV (Korean: 아리랑 TV) is a South Korean international broadcaster owned and operated by Korea International Broadcasting Foundation. It broadcasts current news and programs offering political, economic, and cultural content from a Korean perspective to a global audience in 134 countries around the world. In 2011, Arirang TV was investigated in regards to an embezzlement scheme in which employees were being underpaid in order to siphon money into "borrowed-name" bank accounts. Throughout its history Arirang TV has functioned with a relatively low budget in comparison to similar international stations. In 2018, the network received another budget cut which led nearly 200 employees losing their jobs.

== History ==
Launched locally by the government in 1996, with the motto "Korea for the World, the World for Korea," the Korea International Broadcasting Foundation began broadcasting as Arirang TV in 1997. The foundation started broadcasting overseas in 1999 within the Asia region. The name of the broadcast comes from the traditional Korean folk song Arirang. In January 2010, the network split its programming into two categories, news and non-news, with additional news bulletins and current affairs programs being added to the schedule, as well as more cultural programming. The Vietnamese drama series Chạy án premiered on 4 January, with subtitles in both Korean and English.

In 2011, Arirang TV was the subject of an embezzlement investigation by the Anti-Corruption and Civil Rights Commission (ACRC). The ACRC reported that the – now former – chief producer of Showbiz Extra, an entertainment news program, was embezzling money by underpaying employees and instead diverting the money to "borrowed-name" bank accounts. These bank accounts were used as fake employees for payroll. One example was a bank account belonging to "Kim Jin-ah", who was supposed to be a 20-year-old translator for the show. This supposed employee was paid ₩81 million from the network between September 2006 and December 2007. Following the ACRC investigation, two Arirang TV senior officials were sentenced to prison. The first was sentenced to 10 months in prison for embezzling ₩250M and the second was sentenced to 6 months in prison for embezzling ₩67M. Shin Woo-jeong, a judge with the Seoul District Court was quoted in The Korea Times, "The two claimed that it was common practice for the employees of the company to inflate production costs."

Following the embezzlement scandal in 2011, suggestions had emerged for the merger of Arirang TV and KBS World, considering that Arirang, like many other English-language media outlets in South Korea, was suffering from insufficient funding, staffing, and programming content. The network later stabilized its operations.

In September 2016, Arirang TV became one of the first South Korean channels to air 24 hours a day on UK television services, such as Sky UK and Freesat, while also expanding to the United States via DirecTV and the United Nations in-house network. In 2015, Arirang TV launched a dedicated channel for the United Nations headquarters in New York, broadcasting in English to promote international understanding of Korean culture.

In January 2018, due to budget cuts, the network cut its programs from 36 down to 18. This program cut also led to approximately 190 freelancers and contract workers also losing their jobs. The budget cuts came after the parent company, Korea International Broadcasting Foundation, no longer had enough money to cover the entire budget. The 2018 budget was reduced by ₩5.2 billion compared to the previous year. The network also lost approximately one-third of its journalists during 2017 because of the financial issues.

== See also ==
- Arirang Radio – English-language radio station in South Korea
- Television in South Korea
- List of world news channels
- International mass media of South Korea
