= Jeju Ilbo =

Newspaper of Jeju Province, South Korea

- June 2, 1964 issue
- Founded: October 1, 1945
- Language: Korean
- Headquarters: Jeju City, Jeju Province, South Korea
- Website: www.jejunews.com

Jeju Ilbo (Korean: 제주일보; Hanja: 濟州日報) is a Korean-language daily regional newspaper for Jeju Province, South Korea. It is Jeju's oldest active newspaper.

== History ==
It was established on October 1, 1945, soon after the liberation of Korea. The newspaper was established using equipment from its Japanese predecessor, Saishū Shinbun (Japanese: 濟州新聞; Korean: 제주신문; RR: Jeju sinmun). Jeju Ilbo's first president was Kim Seok-u (김석우; 金錫祐).

The newspaper was first published every other day as a two-page paper. It then became a daily paper, and increased the number of pages to 4 per issue. During the 1948–1949 Jeju uprising, the newspaper was seized by the North-West Youth Association and operated irregularly.

On November 20, 1962, in accordance with media restrictions during the Third Republic, the paper was merged with a weekly paper Jemin Ilbo (제민일보; 濟民日報) and published under the name Jeju Sinmun (제주신문). It had a new headquarters built in Jeju City in November 1973. On November 1, 1996, it changed its name to Jeju Ilbo and changed to using horizontal type.

The newspaper has maintained a Seogwipo branch since early in its history.

In 2012, the newspaper declared bankruptcy. In 2013, the chairman of Jeju Ilbo was arrested on charges of embezzlement. This led to a breakaway group that, in 2015, founded a competing Jeju Ilbo; both groups claimed to be the authentic newspaper. Later that year, the two newspapers bid at a court auction to see who could claim the original name; the breakaway group won the auction and changed its name to Jeju Ilbo. The mainline group changed its name to Jeju Sinbo. In 2020, another lawsuit resulted in the mainline group winning back the rights to the name. The breakaway group then changed its name to New Jeju Ilbo. The breakaway group finally changed its name to Samda Ilbo.
