= Dong-A Broadcasting System =

Defunct South Korean radio station

Dong-A Broadcasting
- Type: Radio network
- Branding: DBS
- First air date: 25 April 1963
- Headquarters: Seoul
- Broadcast area: Nationwide
- Owner: Dong-A Ilbo
- Parent: Dong-A Ilbo
- Launch date: 25 April 1963
- Dissolved: 30 November 1980 (17 years, 7 months and 5 days)
- Language: Korean
- Replaced by: KBS Radio Seoul (1980); Channel A (2011)

The Dong-A Broadcasting System (Korean: 동아방송) was a South Korean radio station owned by the Dong-A Ilbo. Unlike the Tongyang Broadcasting Corporation, DBS was a national service.

== History ==
In October 1960, after the first Democratic Party government was in power, Dong-A Ilbo decided to create its own radio station. It received its license in January 1961 and, in 1962, started preparing for its launch, with Choi Chang-bong, who had worked at KBS for the development of KBS Television and Shin Gwang-woo, president of the Korean Electronics Industry. On December 14, test broadcasts started.

DBS started broadcasting at 5:30am on April 25, 1963. The station opened with the first news bulletin, introduced with the message "Hello, listeners, this is the Dong-A Broadcasting System. We will bring you the first news from the Dong-A Ilbo", followed by Liszt's Prelude, and a 25-minute opening speech, which stated that the station was bound to maintain its impartial image. At 7:05am, Choi Doo-seon, president of Dong-A Ilbo, officially opened the station. The call sign was HLKJ, operating on 1230 kHz with an output of 10 kW.

DBS' first ever radio drama show and South Korea's first docudrama, Yeomyeong 80 Years, aired every night (between 22:15 and 22:35). Since broadcasters at the time were only airing melodramas and soap operas, Yeomyeong 80 Years was a radical debut of a new drama genre in South Korean radio history. It stopped airing in 1964 and during the same year, the show was made into a six-book novel series and received the Hankook Ilbo Publishing Award. Delightful Livingroom, DBS' oldest radio show, was a talk show where different guests visited the set ("livingroom") and talk about different topics in a humorous, sarcastic, and satirical manner. This show is also considered as South Korea's first talk show on neither TV or radio. Also in the same year, DBS became the first broadcaster in South Korea to an open satellite studio in Midopa Department Store in Myeongdong.

DBS' music programme, Top Tune Show was the harbinger of radio Disc Jockey genre in South Korea. Other stations' music shows at the time were employing professional announcers as their presenters and the producers of the show would do the audio mixing separately. However, Top Tune Show first employed an integrated system where a single music-knowledgeable producer do everything from mixing, presenting to adding commentaries. Following Top Tune Show's popularity, similar music-genre programmes such as 'Dial at 3pm' and 'Dial at 0 hour' debuted. In these programmes, there was a common segment called the 'Request Corner.' In this segment, listeners will call in to request their desired song to be played live and this was possible due to DBS retaining a comparably large music library with more than 2000 world music records.

DBS' What do you think? is the world's first "town meeting" program which started in 1965. It was a live debate show dealing with different political and economic issues. This show was an extremely radical program considering the oppressive military regime at the time when freedom of press was severely restricted. Furthermore, Hyun-Doo Kang, Seoul National University's honorary professor and former professor of journalism commented, "DBS will be recorded as the most brave station in the history of broadcasting."

In 1966, DBS was able to live broadcast the 37th Dong-A Marathon and this was the first time to live broadcast a full marathon race in South Korean radio history.

In 1976, DBS Monday through Tuesday radio drama Pretty Boy Got the number one spot with 97.3%, achieving an all-kill against MBC's Nationwide News 8, KBS's Evening News and TBC's FM Latest Inkigayo on its time slot. No other radio program has broken this record until now. In November 1980, DBS permanently discontinued airing due to the government's mandatory merger decision and was integrated with Korean Broadcasting System. The final broadcast was Goodbye Song, a closing program, and the signal shut down at 12:20am on the early hours of December 1, 1980. On December 25, 1980, Dong-A Broadcasting Station closed due to the mandatory merger to the Korean Broadcasting System by the military government forces resulting in the launching of KBS Radio Seoul. In 1991, Dong-A Broadcasting Station's Frequency of 792 kHz is transferred to Seoul Broadcasting System. On January 1, 2000, Construction completion of Dong-A Media Center. On July 22, 2009, Amendment of Media law passed the national assembly to deregulate the media market of South Korea.

== See also ==
- KBS
- Channel A
