= Hanguk-FM =

1971–1980 radio station in South Korea

Hanguk-FM (Korean: 한국FM방송), abbreviated BBC, was an independent radio station that existed in Daegu between 1971 and 1980.

== History ==
Korea FM obtained its permission to install an FM station on March 24, 1970. BBC started broadcasting on April 25, 1971, on 89.7 FM and using the HLCB callsign. At the beginning of its operations, it broadcast 14 hours a day, but from June that year, it extended to a 21-hour service from 6am to 1am the following morning. Hanguk-FM focused on listener participation programs such as classical music and requested music, while still claiming to be an FM specialist station, it strived to develop programs that took full advantage of the characteristics of FM radio and, considering that more than 80% of its listeners were students, it strived to develop liberal arts or educational programs.

On April 11, 1972, Korea's first 4-channel stereophonic broadcast was tested in partnership with Japanese FM stations, while an edudcational program started in July. It also contributed to the development of local music and art by hosting high-quality concerts and providing presentation opportunities to local musicians and traditional Korean musicians.

Its broadcasts ended on November 30, 1980, and was absorbed into the Korean Broadcasting System. The callsign HLCB was reused for KBS 1FM's Daegu station.
