= KBS2 =

South Korean public television channel

KBS 2TV
- Country: South Korea
- Network: Korean Broadcasting System

Programming
- Language: Korean
- Picture format: 2160p UHDTV (downscaled to 1080i and 480i for the HDTV and SDTV feeds respectively)

Ownership
- Owner: Korean Broadcasting System
- Sister channels: KBS1; KBS NEWS 24

History
- Launched: 1 December 1980; 45 years ago
- Replaced: TBC TV (1964–1980)

Links
- Website: KBS 2TV

Availability

Terrestrial
- Digital terrestrial television: Channel 7.1

Streaming media
- KBS: Watch live (South Korea only)

KBS 2TV (Korean: KBS 제2텔레비전) is a South Korean free-to-air television channel launched on 1 December 1980. The channel is owned and operated by the Korean Broadcasting System, a public corporation that serves as South Korea's largest national broadcaster. In contrast to the primarily news-focused KBS1, the channel specializes in entertainment broadcasts.

== History ==
KBS2 was created following the implementation of the Policy for Merger and Abolition of the Press in 1980. The Tongyang Broadcasting Company, founded by Samsung founder Lee Byung-chul, had its license revoked by South Korea's nascent military dictatorship under Chun Doo-hwan; its operations were subsequently absorbed into the Korean Broadcasting System. At the time, TBC was Korea's second-largest radio and television company. On 30 November 1980, following TBC's final broadcast, the newly-created KBS2 channel signed on in Seoul and Busan, taking over TBC's former television and radio stations. A limited number of TBC's programs were continued under KBS, including the KBS Music Festival, which started in 1965.

The initial goal of KBS2 was to serve as a complement to the news-focused KBS1, with KBS2 being dedicated to cultural and educational programming. The channel began broadcasting in color on 22 December 1980, alongside the competing MBC TV channel. Initially commercial-free, the two KBS networks reintroduced commercial advertising on 7 March 1981. On 3 November 1986, KBS2 added a primetime news bulletin at 8:05pm, alongside several foreign-language learning programs.

Upon the introduction of cable television networks in South Korea in the early 90s, KBS2 was deemed a must-carry channel, in contrast to two of its largest commercial competitors, MBC and SBS. The channel adopted green as its signature color in 1993. On 20 April 1997, the channel saw a record ratings surge of 65.8% during the final episode of First Love, a highly-popular Korean drama that began airing on KBS2 in 1996.

KBS2 began offering digital terrestrial broadcasts on a national scale in 2001. In 2012, the channel ceased airing analog broadcasts. On 14 October 2006, the channel's signal was interrupted for a 20-minute period during the evening broadcast due to technical issues.

KBS2 was granted a digital subchannel, KBS2 7-2, in 2015.

== Programming ==
Korean dramas comprise a significant portion of KBS2's broadcast schedule. During the final week of April 2024, only two of KBS2's dramas were among the ten-most watched programs of the genre on linear and OTT platforms, with viewing figures lower than dramas broadcast on competing channels tvN and JTBC, as well as streaming services.

In addition to dramas, KBS2 also airs news, variety shows and the popular music program Music Bank.

== Network ==
KBS2's long-running analog broadcast, which ceased operations in 2012, was shown on the following channels across South Korea:

- Gangneung: channel 6
- Seoul: channel 7
- Busan: channel 7
- Jeju: channel 10
- Jeonju: channel 13
- Pohang: channel 20
- Chuncheon: channel 22
- Andong: channel 23
- Yeosu: channel 24
- Cheongju: channel 24
- Gwangju: channel 25
- Ulsan: channel 27
- Jinju: channel 27
- Mokpo: channel 29
- Chungju: channel 30
- Wonju: channel 31
- Daegu: channel 38
- Daejeon: channel 42
- Changwon: channel 45

== Mascot ==
Kebit (케빗), the channel's official mascot, was introduced in July 2016. Kebit is portrayed as a space lifeform who descended to Earth, and represents "the light of KBS".

== See also ==
- KBS1
- KBS News 24
- EBS1
- EBS2
