= All TV (Canada) =

Canadian Korean language television channel

- All TV logo
- Country: Canada
- Broadcast area: National
- Headquarters: Toronto, Ontario

Programming
- Picture format: 480i (SDTV); 1080i (HDTV)

Ownership
- Owner: Jang Sung Lee
- Sister channels: All TV K

History
- Launched: September 15, 2001

Links
- Website: All TV (in Korean)

All TV (Korean: 얼 TV(티비); RR: Eol Tibi) is a Canadian exempt Category B Korean language specialty channel. It was launched in September 2001 and is owned by Jang Sung Lee.

All TV features are a mix of local and foreign programming from Korea. The foreign programming that airs on All TV comes from MBC. Local programming is produced in All TV's state-of-the-art broadcast centre, which includes three studios, 10 video editing suites and sound recording facilities. It is also located in the Korean Cultural Centre in Toronto. The programs produced include a daily newscast, talk shows, cooking shows and a real estate program.

On January 18, 2019, the CRTC approved All TV Inc.'s request to convert All TV from a licensed Category B specialty service to an exempted Cat. B third language service.

== ALL TV K ==
In July 2009, All TV launched KBS World on Rogers Cable. Seabridge Media operated a similar service until early 2009, when the company shut down. At that point, All TV stepped in and launched its KBS World channel, allowing the service to remain on the air in Canada. In 2013, the channel was renamed All TV K.

== Content agreement with SBS ==
In December 2010, All TV announced it had signed a content agreement with Korean broadcaster SBS. Programming from SBS began airing on All TV on December 13, 2010.

As of 2018, All TV no longer airs any programming from SBS.

== All TV HD ==
On July 18, 2013, All TV launched All TV HD, a high-definition simulcast of the standard-definition feed. It is currently available on Bell Fibe TV.

== See also ==
- All TV K
