= Tongyang Broadcasting Company =

Defunct South Korean TV station

Tongyang Broadcasting

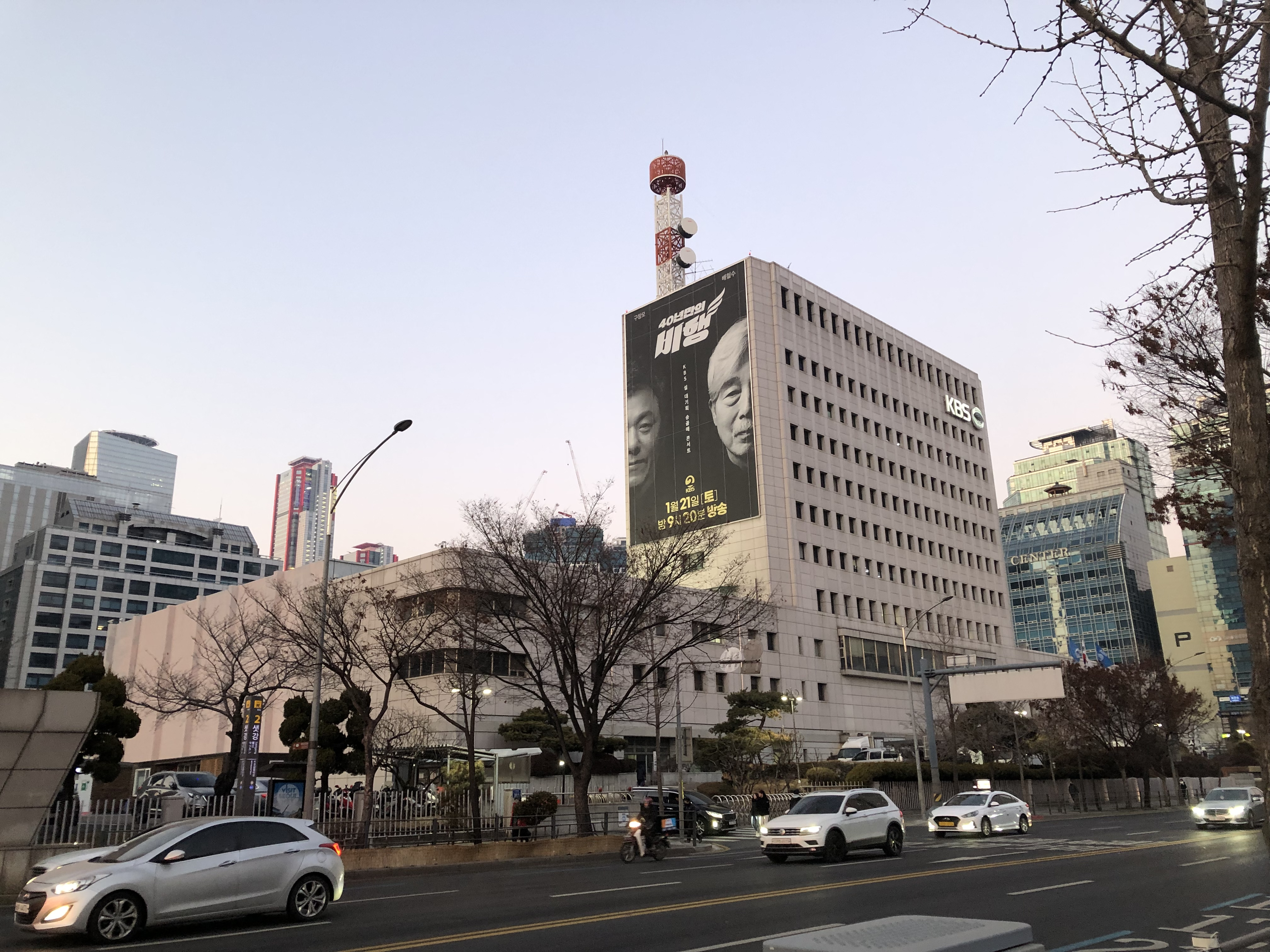
- TBC's former offices in Yeouido, now known today as the KBS Annex.
- Type: Television and radio station
- Founded: June 26, 1964
- Headquarters: KBS Annex, Yeouido, Seoul, South Korea
- Owner: Samsung
- Established: May 9, 1964
- Launch date: May 9, 1964 (radio); December 7, 1964 (television)
- Dissolved: November 30, 1980 (radio, after 16 years, 6 months and 3 weeks); November 30, 1980 (television, after 15 years, 11 months, 3 weeks and 2 days)
- HLKC-TV: Channel 7 (now occupied by KBS2)
- HLKC-AM and FM: AM 639 kHz and FM 89.1MHz
- Replaced by: KBS2 (1980); JTBC (2011)

Korean name
- Hangul: 동양방송
- Hanja: 東洋放送
- RR: Dongyang bangsong
- MR: Tongyang pangsong

Tongyang Broadcasting Company was a South Korean commercial television station which was merged by the government with KBS. It was owned by the Samsung Group founder Lee Byung-chul and was a sister company to the JoongAng Ilbo.

== History ==
=== Early developments ===
It was reported in September 1962 that preparations were being made for the first commercial TV broadcast in Korea. According to the article, Tongyang TV Broadcasting Co., Ltd. was ready to transmit radio waves using purely Korean technology, having secured three cameras and one relay vehicle, and applied before the Korean government for broadcasting frequencies. In January of the following year, it was reported that it was scheduled to be established in May by being assigned channel 7 with permission from the authorities. However, the launch was postponed, and in July of that year, chairman Lee Jae-hyeong and director Lee Byung-cheol visited Nippon Television's president, Matsutarō Shōriki, and asked for assistance. At that time, the government showed willingness to produce TV receivers and transmitters in Korea, except for parts that could not be manufactured, and the first TV cameras from Tongyang Broadcasting Station were produced by combining movie cameras and used devices.

=== Sign-on and operations ===
On May 9, 1964, Tongyang Radio was launched, and on December 7, 1964, Tongyang Television (with headquarters in Seoul on VHF channel 7, call sign HLCE-TV followed by a branch in Busan on channel 9 on December 12, 1964) under the name JBS, on January 15, 1966, it changed from JoongAng (Central) Broadcasting Co., Ltd. to Tongyang Broadcasting, On August 15 of the following year, Tongyang Standard FM was launched. Since the establishment of TBC-TV, Tongyang Broadcasting had garnered attention with popular variety shows such as Show Show Show and various soap operas, even surpassing the ratings of KBS, which was a state-run broadcaster. Despite MBC producing several hit dramas, TBC remained dominant after TV broadcasting was introduced. Overall, Tongyang Broadcasting slightly outperformed MBC.

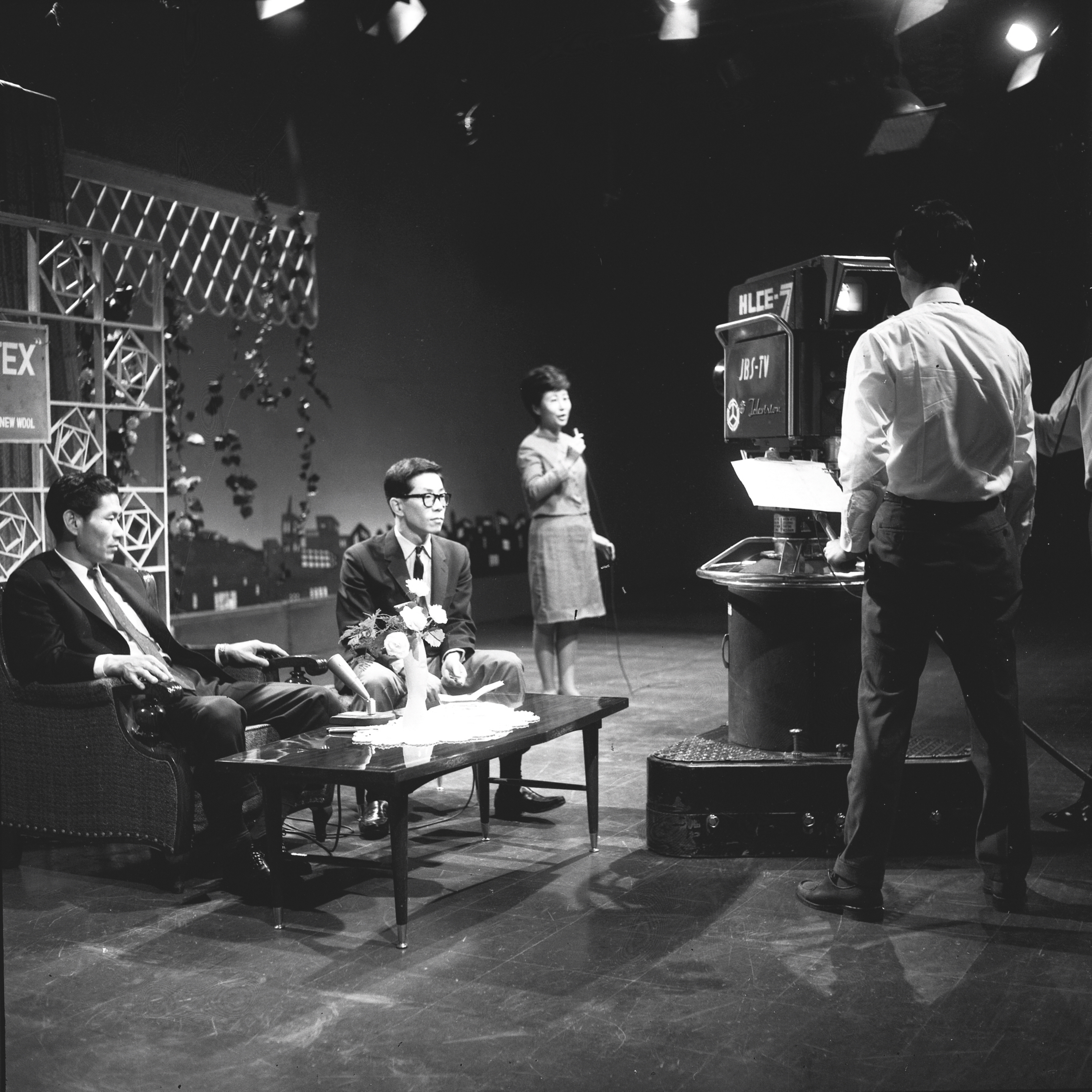
JBS-TV's camera and studio in May 1966

Fiscally, TBC achieved tremendous success due to its connections with Samsung. The channel was headed by its founder, and one of TBC's subliminal goals was to sell more television sets at a time when they were still scarce. TBC also took the upper hand in producing pre-recorded dramas, something that KBS had not yet achieved. TBC also had an animation division, which provided subcontracting services for Japanese animation companies. As a result of having these contracts, the network assisted in the production of The Golden Bat and Ghost Man. From 1973, it also started accepting American orders, with Universal Arts being the first client. This would pave way to an entire subcontracting industry in Korea.

In the late 1960s, foreign loans of more than US$870,000 were introduced to expand the facility. In July 1969, the Apollo 11 Moon landing was broadcast live on TV and radio. In 1971, the nominal capital of Tongyang Broadcasting was valued at 400 million won. In the early 1970s, a transmission tower was established in partnership with Dong-A Broadcasting and Munhwa Broadcasting. Since 1978, it had grown significantly, including preparing for color television broadcasts. In the case of Tongyang TV's Busan branch, it was impossible to broadcast a direct signal from Seoul (simultaneous transmission) due to the absence of microwaves, focusing on local programs in Busan, Ulsan, and Gyeongsangnam-do. Therefore, the Seoul (key station) programs such as Show Show Show were broadcast by air or railroad (overland), and broadcasts were delayed by one week, contributing to strengthening the independence of local broadcasting.

=== Media consolidation ===
5 minutes left, 5 minutes left... The remaining 5 minutes are too harsh. I wish it was 10 minutes. Can't 5 minutes be 10 minutes? Even if the Tongyang Broadcasting that you cherished disappears... We would be grateful if you could cherish the memories of Tongyang Broadcasting in your hearts for a long time. Ah, it's 4 minutes. Goodbye. Goodbye. This is TBC Tongyang Broadcasting. This is TBC Tongyang Broadcasting, your station. Stay safe and healthy until we meet again. I leave with the hope that your work will be accomplished as you wish and that God's protection will always be with you, the TBC family. I will also take off my headphones now. Thank you. Thank you. And I will now leave Tongyang Broadcasting, knowing that Studio 7 is a place with which I have become attached. Tongyang Broadcasting is now 3 minutes long. Lastly, I would like to inform you once again of Tongyang Broadcasting's call sign. Here it is… 639 kilohertz… HLKC… This is… Tongyang Broadcasting..."

In November 1980, Tongyang Broadcasting was forced to merge with KBS at 00:00 on December 1, 1980, following the media consolidation measures carried out by Heo Mun-do after the 12·12 coup and the military forces coming into power. TBC Radio was split into two with the AM frequency becoming KBS Radio 3 and the FM frequency became KBS 2FM, and TBC TV became KBS2. Tongyang Broadcasting subsequently came to an end. At the time of the merger and acquisition, Tongyang Broadcasting's assets amounted to 34 billion won. Dong-A Broadcasting System's was about 4.2 billion won, and other broadcasters were less than 1 billion. Later, JoongAng Ilbo estimated the assets at the time to be 70 billion won. On the March 12, 2008 edition of MBC's The Knee-Drop Guru, host Heo Cham said, "Many singers cried during Tongyang Broadcasting's farewell broadcast, and it turned into a sea of tears. In particular, Lee Eun-ha cried during this broadcast, so she was suspended from appearing on radio for a while".

Ahead of its closure, it was decided that its television programs were to be absorbed by KBS1. Its last radio news bulletin was delivered at 7pm on November 30, the broadcasts ended on the radio during To You Who Forgot the Night at midnight. TBC's television broadcasts ended at 11:30pm with the ending of Farewell From the TBC Family.

=== After the media consolidation ===
In October 1988, just before the fifth government investigation led by the Roh Tae-woo administration and the hearings on the Fifth Republic, the Tongyang Broadcasting Revitalization Promotion Committee was formed and adopted a resolution calling for the revival of its operations.

On November 26, 1990, JoongAng Ilbo submitted an application to the Seoul District Prosecutors' Office, requesting compensation of KRW 860 billion for damages incurred from the forced transfer of Tongyang Broadcasting to the Korean Broadcasting System and the state. After a lapse of three years, the committee rejected compensation claims from 14 companies, including JoongAng Ilbo.

On November 30, 2009, 19 years later, about 400 people, including former TBC officials and entertainers, held a 'Prayer for the Restoration of Tongyang Broadcasting' and adopted the resolution to encourage JoongAng Ilbo to advance into the general entertainment channel business. The JoongAng Ilbo insisted that its long-term channel JTBC was the successor to TBC before the Korea Communications Commission's selection process for the generalist channel and was closed on November 30, 1980. It was launched on December 1, 2011, in commemoration of 31st anniversary of TBC's shutdown.

The FM frequency of Tongyang Radio, 89.1 MHz, became KBS 2FM on December 1, 1980, and the TV callsign of the Busan branch of Tongyang Broadcasting was reorganized to KBS Busan 2TV.

== Television shows ==
- Show Show Show
- Long Live the Long Life
- Hodolyi and Tosuni
- Gayo Olympics
- TBC Quiz King
- Classical Theatre of humor
- Okay Good Group
- Sincerely, TBC
- TBC News Plaza (now KBS News Plaza)
- TBC 6 News (now KBS News 6)
- TBC Seokkan (TBC Evening, 1972–1980; known as TBC Report, 1976–1978)
- TBC Song Festival (later moved to KBS)
- 재능과 재미!!! (The Korean version of The Tonight Show)

== Radio programs ==
- Lee Deok-hwa and Im Ye-jin's Chunbangjichuk Radio (flagship music program, format similar to CulTwo Show in present times)
- To You Who Forgot the Night (moved to KBS Radio 1 then to KBS Happy FM).
- FM Parade (still on the same frequency this time as KBS 2FM)
- I Like Radio
- Good Morning Happiness Touch
- Music Date
- Daebak! Music Trend
- FM Hall of Fame
- The Latest Music
- Changinkut Radio!
- Music Today
- Issues and People
- Radio Request
- FM Today
- TBC News Morning
- TBC All That Chart Top 50
- TBC Newsline
- FM Latest Inkigayo
- TBC News 2
- TBC 12 News
- TBC News 7 (Main newscast, rivals back then where MBC News Nationwide (now defunct) and KBS Network Evening News (still airing on KBS Radio 1))
- TBC Afternoon Drama (at 12:30pm KST)
- TBC Primetime Drama (at 07:30pm KST)
- TBC Monday-Tuesday Drama (at 06:00~07:00pm KST)
- TBC Wednesday-Thursday Drama (at 06:00~07:00pm KST)
- TBC Friday Drama (at 06:00~07:00pm KST)

== See also ==
- JTBC
- Policy for Merger and Abolition of the Press
- Rede Tupi - A Brazilian television network that was also forcefully closed down by the military dictatorship at the same year.
- RCTV - A Venezuelan broadcasting company that was forcefully closed down by the government.
- ABS-CBN - A Philippine media company whose terrestrial network was shut down by the government after the franchise was expired.
- Thames Television - A London ITV franchise holder that lost its ITV franchise due to an alleged political motivations against airing of a documentary about Operation Flavius titled "Death on the Rock".
