= Kwangju Ilbo =

South Korean daily regional newspaper

- Founded: November 2003; 22 years ago
- Website: www.kwangju.co.kr

Korean name
- Hangul: 광주일보
- Hanja: 光州日報
- RR: Gwangju ilbo
- MR: Kwangju ilbo

Kwangju Ilbo (Korean: 광주일보) is a South Korean regional daily newspaper. It was part of Daeju Group in November 2003. It was created by Honam journalists in 1952. Kwangu Ilbo was formed by a merger of Jeonnam Ilbo and Jeonnam Meil because of a media blackout imposed by a new army group (1980th). In 2004, it was changed from an evening to a morning newspaper.

== History ==
=== 1952 to 1980 ===
The Kwangju Ilbo was founded on 31 November 1980 as The Daily local newspaper, which combined The Jeonnam Ilbo and The Jeonnam Maeil Ilbo . At that time, The Jeonnam Ilbo had been in existence for twenty-eight years and nine months (with 9635 issues), The Jeonnam Maeil Ilbo had been in existence for twenty years and two months (with 5806 issues).

=== 1980 to 1990 ===
In 1982, they made 'Mudeung Munhwa award'. In 1984, they published <Monthly Yehyang>.

=== 1990 to 2000 ===
In 1990, they conducted a campaign to raise funds for the construction of Namdo Haksuk and introduced Computer Type System. In 1993, they published「Gwang-ju Cheonam one hundred years chronological table」, and slated for Electric light news-board. In 1996, they purchased Cutting edge color rotary press, starting internet service. and operating Super sized Electric light news-board. In 1997, Second factory was published at Songha-dong, Namgu, Gwangju.

=== 2000 to present ===
In 2004, <Monthly Yehyang> was discontinued (with 209 issues). In May 2004, they founded Hampyeong Dynasty CC. Since January 2004, converted to morning paper, they started the second inception. In 2011, Kwangju Ilbo channel A was set up.

== Content ==
At first, it was published for 48 pages a week. In 1981 it was expanded from 48 to 72 pages per week (12 pages a day). In 1999, it was fully written laterally. In 2004, it became a morning paper. The paper has had an online presence since 1996.

== Editors ==
- Nam-jung Kim (1884-1975)
- Jong-tae Kim (1975-1994)
- Seoung-ho Choi (1993-1912)
- Young-ho Son (2003-2004)
- In-ho Baeck (2004-2006)
- Jin-young Kim (2006-2009)
- Jae-cheol You (2009-2012)
- Yae-song Kim (2012-2013)

== Readership ==
About 45,000 people have subscribed to this newspaper per day. It is ranked ninth among local newspapers in South Korea except for major newspapers like Chosun or Dong-a Ilbo.

== Ownership ==
It is owned by Daeju Group. Daeju Group started from Daeju Instruction. It has become a solid business entity with 14 affiliates. In particular, the company showed rapid growth in the 2000s. Kwangju Ilbo became affiliated with Daeju Group in 2003.
