= KBS World (Japanese TV channel) =

Japanese television channel

- Country: Japan
- Broadcast area: Japan

Programming
- Language(s): Korean with Japanese subtitles

Ownership
- Owner: KBS Japan (a Japanese subsidiary of Korean Broadcasting System)

History
- Launched: April 1, 2006

Links
- Website: www.kbsworld.ne.jp

KBS World is a Japanese television channel operated by KBS Japan, a subsidiary of the Korean Broadcasting System, targeting Koreans in Japan, as well as Japanese audience interested in Korean entertainment. Launched on April 1, 2006, KBS World broadcasts in Korean language with Japanese subtitles most of time.

The channel is available in HD, before the 2012 launch on the international feed.

== History ==
The channel was first established in Japan as KBS Japan KK in October 2005 under Wang Hyun-chul, who was also KBS' foreign correspondent in Japan between 1998 and 2001. Its offices and broadcasting facilities are based in Akasaka, Tokyo. Until then, some KBS programs were carried on Korea Now TV. The channel first launched on SKY PerfecTV! channel 791 in March 2006 and then on J:COM cable in October the same year. As of 2006, KBS World aired over 17 hours of programming subtitled in Japanese.

In a survey conducted by cable company J:COM in May 2013, the channel was at the top spot among 53 channels. In 2019, the channel had a coverage of five million households.
