= Korean Broadcasting System =

South Korean public service broadcaster

Coordinates: 37°31′28″N 126°55′1″E

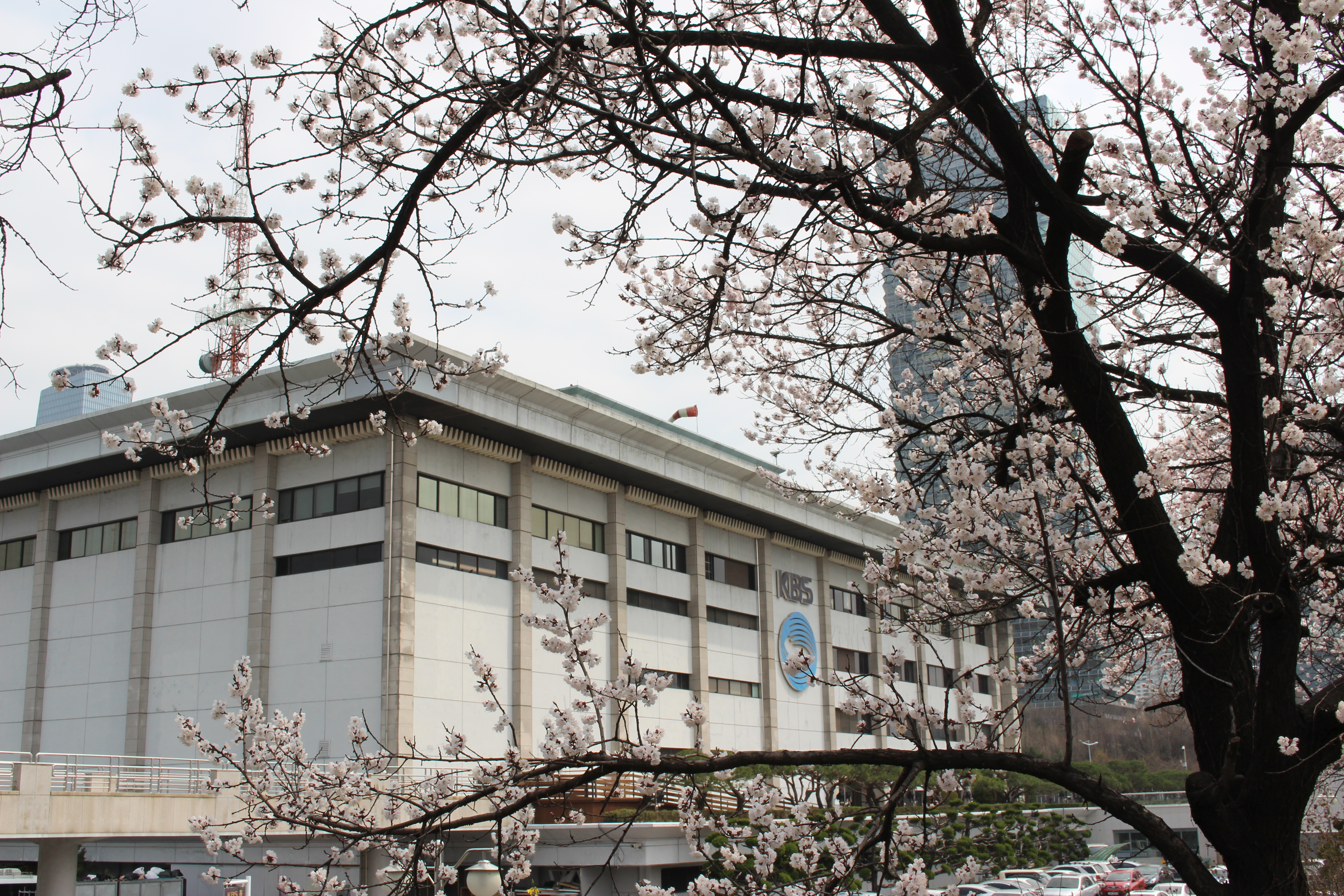
- Main building of the Korean Broadcasting System
- Type: Statutory corporation
- Industry: Public broadcasting
- Predecessors: Kyeongseong/Keijō Broadcasting Station (1927–1932); Chōsen Broadcasting Corporation (1932–1945)
- Founded: 16 February 1927; 99 years ago (as Kyeongseong/Keijō Broadcasting Station) (Radio); May 1956; 70 years ago (television); 3 March 1973; 53 years ago (as Public Broadcasting organization)
- Founder: Governor-General of Korea
- Headquarters: Yeouido, Yeongdeungpo District, Seoul, South Korea
- Area served: Worldwide
- Key people: Park Jang-beom (President and CEO)
- Products: Television; Radio; Web portals
- Owner: Government of South Korea
- Number of employees: 4,701 (As of 1 June 2020)
- Subsidiaries: KBS Media; KBS Art Vision; KBS Business; KBS N; KBS i (closed in 2011); KBS Security; E-KBS; KBS America; KBS Japan; Monster Union

Korean name
- Hangul: 한국방송공사
- Hanja: 韓國放送公社
- RR: Hanguk bangsong gongsa
- MR: Han'guk pangsong kongsa
- Website: Corporation website

The Korean Broadcasting System (KBS; Korean: 한국방송공사) is the national broadcaster of South Korea. Founded in 1927, it is one of the leading South Korean television and radio broadcasters under the government of South Korea.

The KBS operates seven radio networks, ten television channels and multiple Internet-exclusive services. Its flagship terrestrial television station, KBS1, broadcasts on channel 9 while KBS2, an entertainment-oriented network, broadcasts on channel 7. KBS also operates the international service KBS World, which provides television, radio and online services in 12 languages.

== History ==
=== Early radio broadcasts ===
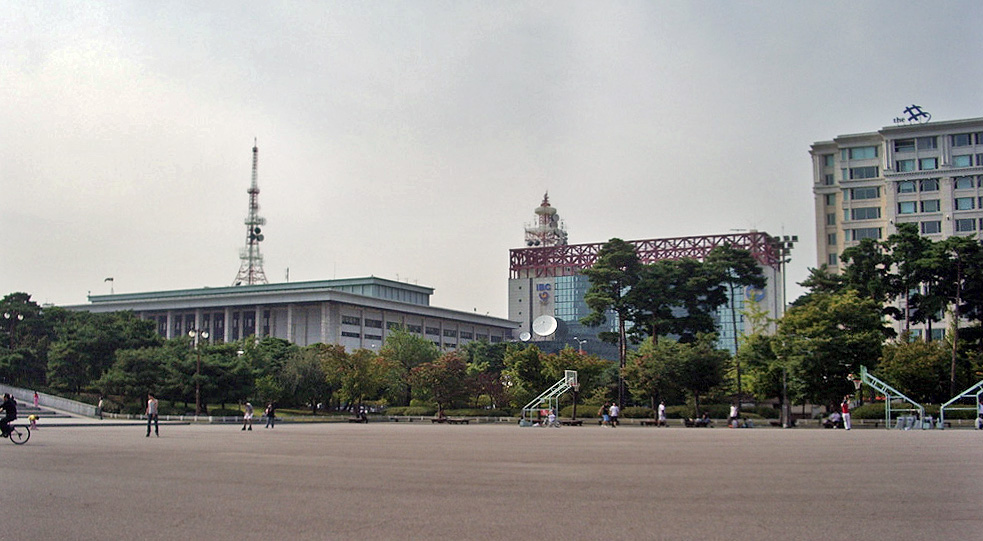
KBS headquarters in Seoul

The KBS began as Gyeongseong Broadcasting Station (경성방송국; 京城放送局) with call sign JODK, established by the Governor-General of Korea on 16 February 1927. It became the Chōsen Broadcasting Corporation (Japanese: 朝鮮放送協會, Hepburn: Chōsen Hōsō Kyōkai) in 1932. After Korea was liberated from Japanese rule at the end of World War II, this station started using the call sign HLKA in 1947 after the US-occupied Korea was granted the ITU prefix HL. After a national broadcast, the station was renamed Seoul Central Broadcasting Station in 1948.

=== 1950s–1960s – Television ===
Television broadcasts in South Korea began on 12 May 1956 on HLKZ-TV. After financial difficulties, it was acquired by KBS in 1961.

=== 1970s – Expansion ===
KBS changed its focus from being a state-controlled media and adopted the concept of being a public-oriented broadcaster on 3 March 1973. Construction of KBS headquarters in Yeouido started in 1976. In 1979 KBS radio began broadcasting on the FM band with the launch of KBS Stereo (now KBS 1FM). Colour television began that year.

=== 1980s – Advertising ===
KBS began broadcasting advertising in 1980, differing from the norm of public broadcasters, after the forced merger of several private broadcasters into KBS by the military government of Chun Doo-hwan. It also bought 65% of the shares of the Munhwa Broadcasting Corporation and the Kyunghyang Shinmun.

During the rule of Chun Doo-hwan, a new law in 1980 forced public broadcasters to merge with KBS. These broadcasters had shown news stories against Chun, leading him to stifle their criticism. These included:

- Tongyang Broadcasting Corporation (TBC)
- Dong-A Broadcasting System (DBS)
- Seohae Broadcasting Corporation (SBC)
- Jeonil Broadcasting Corporation (VOC)
- Hanguk-FM (BBC)

Munhwa Broadcasting Corporation (MBC) was also affected. MBC was, at first, a federation of 20 loosely affiliated member stations across South Korea. Although they shared programming, each station was privately owned (similar to the UK ITV network before the passing of the Broadcasting Act 1990). After the consolidation, however, affiliates were forced to give up a majority of shares to MBC Seoul. MBC Seoul, in turn, was forced to give up 65% of its shares to KBS. In 2009, president Lee Myung-bak said that the law was unconstitutional, and in 2011 TBC and DBS were revived as JTBC and Channel A, respectively.

=== 1990s – Spinoff of EBS ===
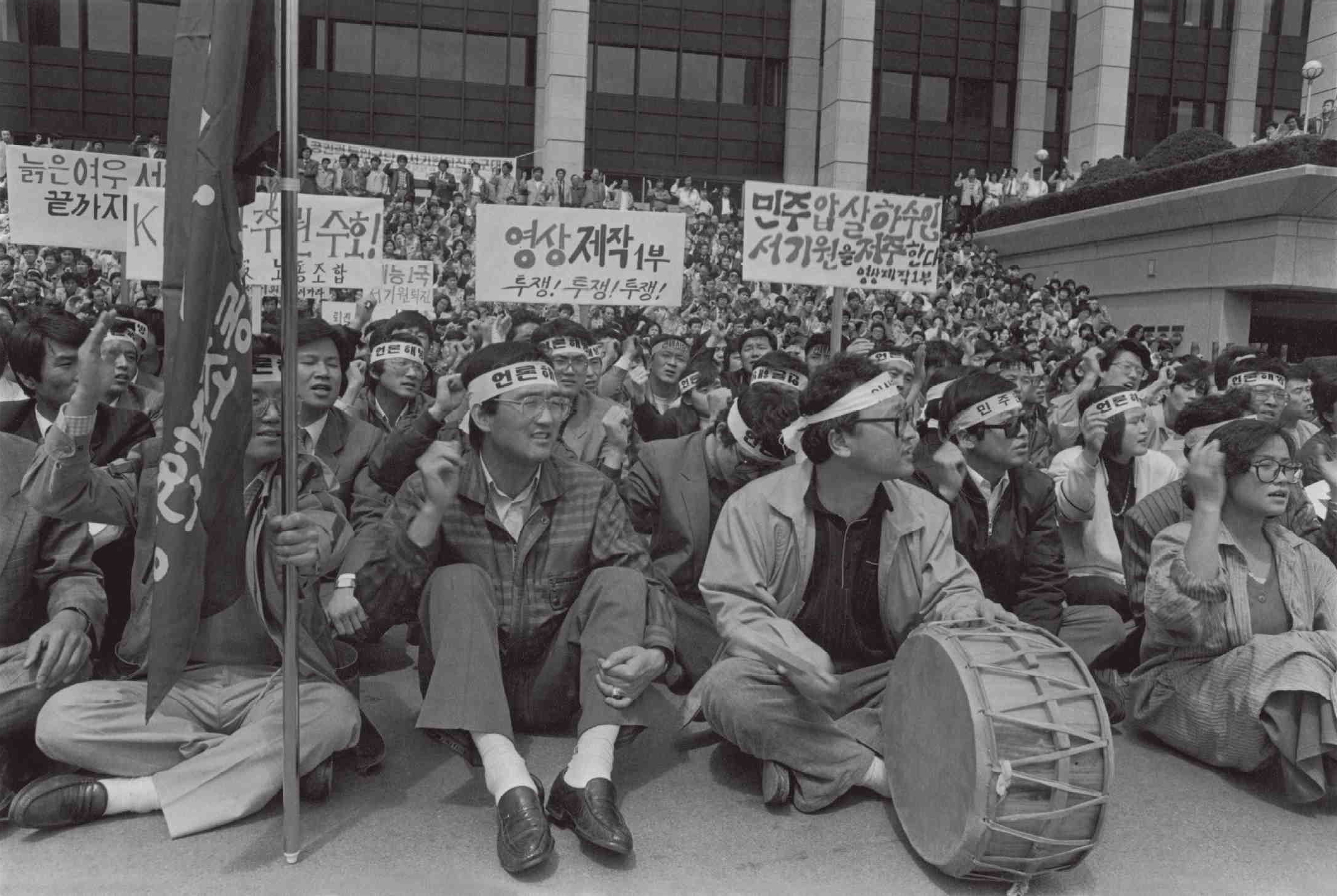
Journalists protest in front of the KBS headquarters in April 1990

In 1981, KBS launched KBS 3TV and Educational FM and on 27 December 1990, both were officially separated from KBS to form the Educational Broadcasting System (EBS).

After a revision of the television licensing fee system in 1994, 1TV and Radio1 stopped broadcasting commercials altogether.

=== 2000s ===
KBS 2FM from 1980 until 2002 was prohibited to air commercial advertisements. In 2002 ads resumed airing.

=== 2010s ===
After first broadcasting HD programmes in 2001, KBS completely switched to digital broadcasting in 2012.

On 16 January 2012, a dispute broke out between KBS and the Korea Cable TV Association (KCTA) over carriage fees. KCTA sought to reduce fees from major national networks for carrying their feeds through subscription providers. KBS had demanded 280 won per subscriber, while the TV providers offered only 100 won per subscription. Negotiations reached a standstill, and so the providers decided to stop carrying KBS2. KBS2 experienced major decline in their ratings, affecting shows such as Brain at the time. Following the blackout, the Korea Communications Commission (KCC) ordered the TV providers to resume distributing the channel or face a hefty fine. They initially refused, but on 17 January, they agreed to resume the channel's carriage.

In 2011, Sohn Hak-kyu, the chairman of the Democratic Party, accused KBS of wiretapping the party's closed-door meeting on TV subscription charges.

Journalists working for KBS (along with MBC, SBS and YTN) protested against journalism practices that favored the Lee Myung-bak government in 2012. The union for KBS released a video clip "Reset KBS News 9" (리셋 KBS 뉴스9) on the internet that discussed the Prime Minister's Office Civilian Surveillance Incident and the controversial money-spending on renovating President Lee's alleged birth house on 13 March 2012.

50th anniversary logo of its founding as public broadcasting organization.

On 3 March 2013, computer shutdowns hit South Korean television stations including KBS. The South Korean government asserted a North Korean link in the March cyberattacks, denied by Pyongyang.

In 2013, KBS World Radio commemorated its 60th anniversary, and KBS World TV celebrated 10 years of its foundation.

In 2014, KBS World 24 was launched, mainly for Koreans abroad.

In 2015, KBS was honoured to have its archives of the KBS Special Live Broadcast, Finding Dispersed Families, inscribed on the UNESCO Memory of the World Register. This makes KBS only the world's second broadcaster to have a broadcast programme on the prestigious list.

The KBS network delivered the exclusive Special Live Broadcast, Finding Dispersed Families, via its primary channel, KBS1. KBS News was the program's producer. The program premiered on 10:15 pm KST on 30 June 1983. After more than 6 months, the special live programme ended at 4 am on 14 November 1983. This marks a total duration of 453 hours and 45 minutes of live broadcast over 138 days, aired nationwide on KBS1. The KBS's archives of Special Live Broadcast, Finding Dispersed Families include; 463 videotapes of the original recordings, and many associated materials, generated in the course of the broadcast, such as the posters carrying the participating dispersed family members' capsule stories, cue sheets, programming schedules, radio recording materials, and related photographs. A total of 20,522 such assorted materials are preserved in the archives. The program was the biggest public affairs program ever produced by KBS and was the first to tackle the issue of families separated because of the long Korean War (1950–1953), which garnered even international coverage.

In 2017, KBS launched the world's first terrestrial UHD broadcasting service.

In June 2018, KBS led the operation of the IBC (International Broadcasting Centre) inside the KINTEX (Korea International Exhibition Center), located in Goyang, as Host Broadcaster for the April 2018 inter-Korean summit. During the summit, KBS successfully delivered all the moments associated with the historic summit for more than 3,000 local and overseas media representatives, gathered at the IBC. Throughout the day of the summit, KBS delivered live coverage through its continuous special news bulletins. Its prime-time news programmes, KBS News 9 and KBS Newsline provided audiences with highlights and implications of the historic summit through comprehensive reports. Also, KBS World TV delivered Live Coverage of April 2018 Inter-Korean summit with English subtitles for its audiences across 117 countries worldwide.

In May 2019, as the public service broadcaster in South Korea, KBS undertook a major reform in its Disaster Broadcast System in order to provide emergency services in times of emergency. To be headed by President and CEO of KBS, the renewed system allowed the use of maximum resources of the organization under emergency circumstances. Under the reform, KBS focused on: swift and efficient emergency broadcast and coverage; delivering essential information in innovative ways with the ultimate aim to minimise losses and damage; and strengthening its digital platforms to better serve wide-ranging audience groups. In particular, KBS signed contracts with sign language interpreters in an effort to enhance broadcast services for audiences with disabilities. In addition, KBS is committed to improve its English subtitle services for people from overseas.

== Structure ==
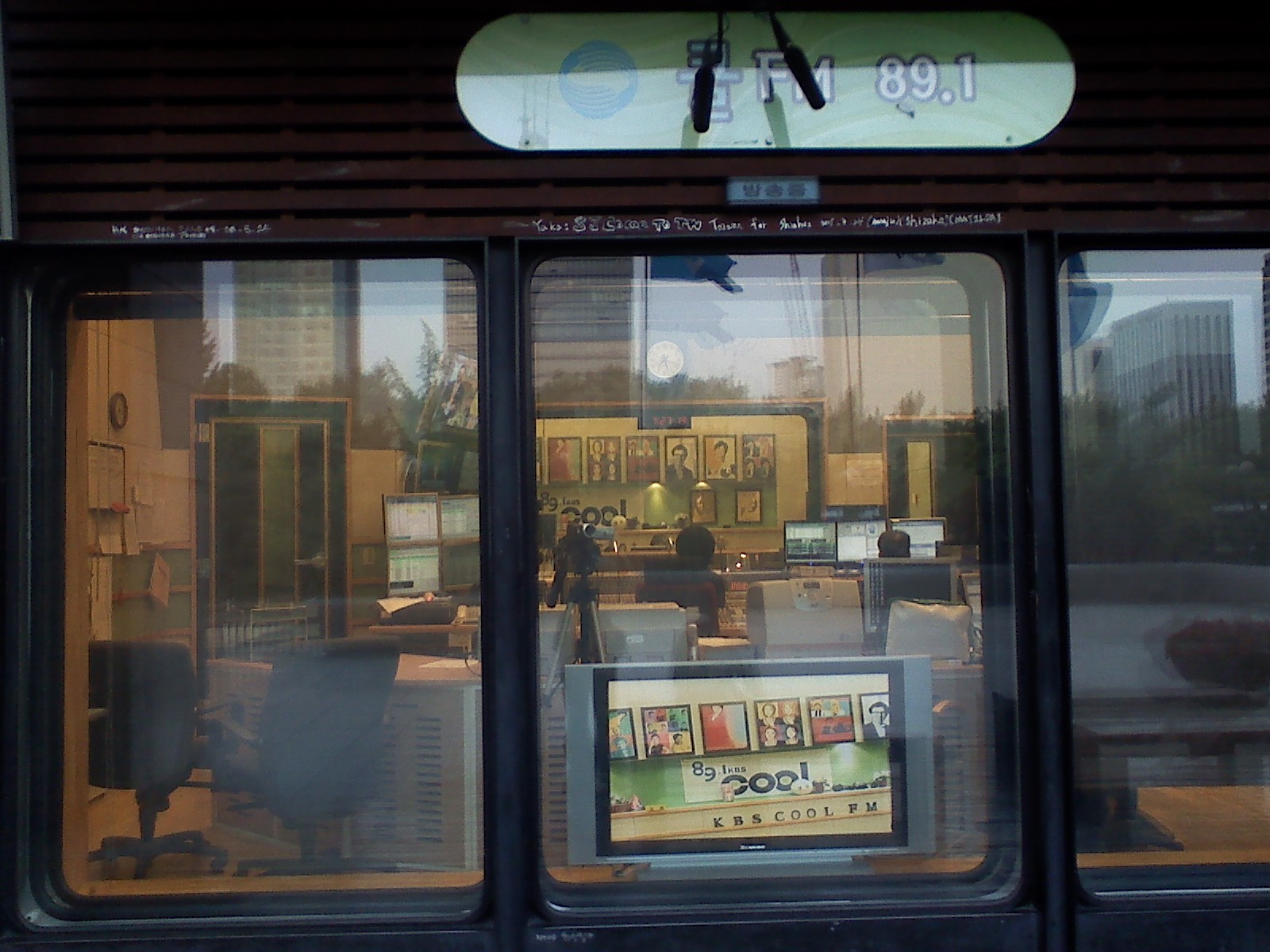
KBS Cool FM Radio studios

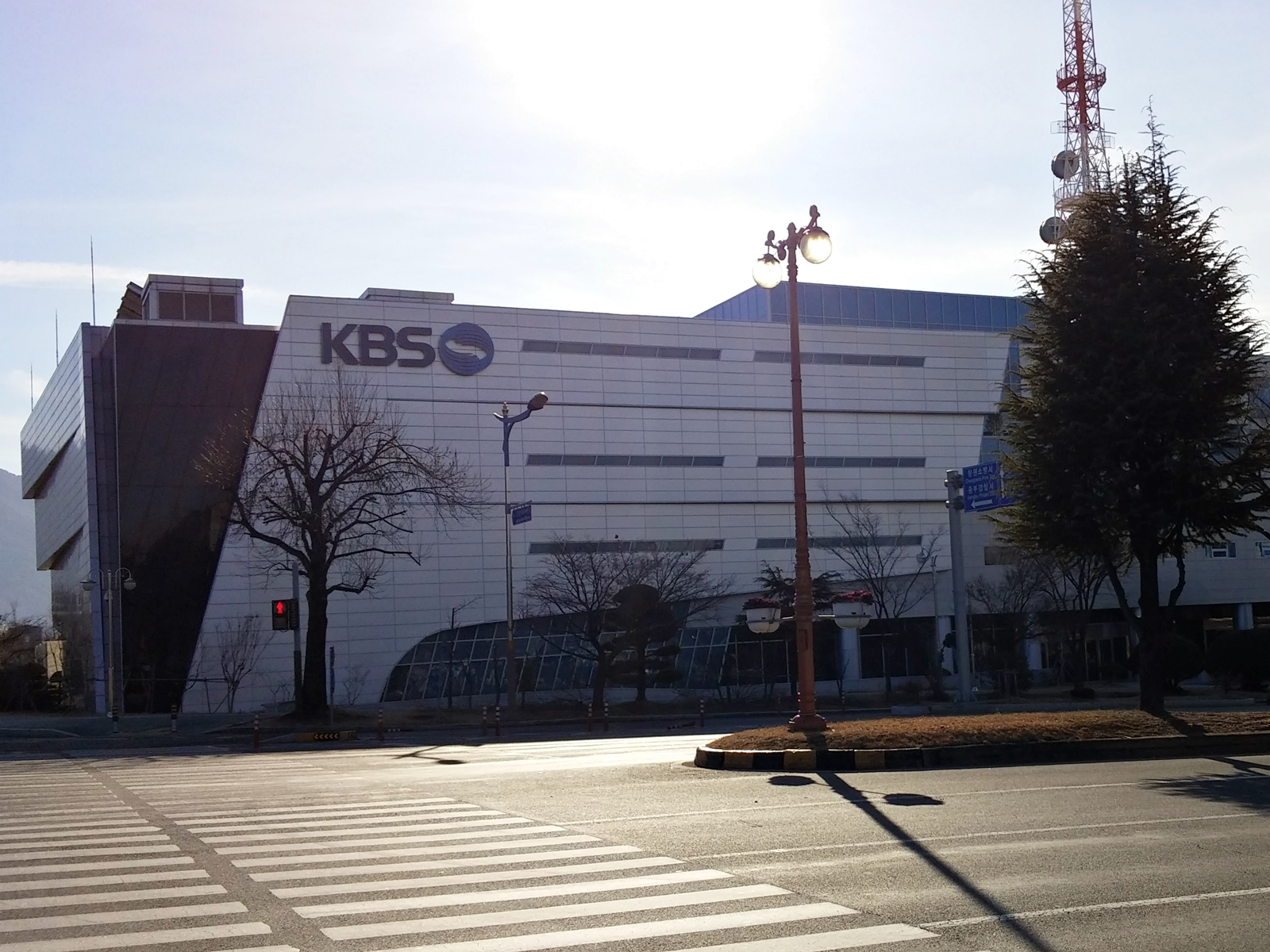
KBS regional broadcasting station in Changwon

KBS is an independently managed public corporation (공사; 公社) funded by the South Korean government and license fees. As part of the Constitution, the KBS president is chosen by the President of South Korea, as recommended by its board of directors. Political parties in South Korea have the right to name members of the KBS board of directors.

This system gives politicians effective control over choosing the president of KBS, as well as its board of directors. People who are critical of the system cite political intervention in KBS's governance as reason for revising the current system of recruiting.

In order to uphold and defend independence, KBS, since 2018, created a 'Public Advisory Group', as part of the selection process of new KBS President and CEO. Each President and CEO of KBS is recommended by the KBS Board of Governors. The Group examines Presidential candidates via a presentation, a panel discussion, and an interview. Each is ultimately appointed by the President.

Around 49% of KBS's revenue comes from a mandatory television licence fee of 2,500 won, on top of 18.7% from commercial advertisement sales.

In addition to 18 regional stations and 12 overseas branches, eight subsidiary companies such as KBSN, KBS Business and KBS Media manage KBS content.

== CEOs ==
Generation	Name	Start	Retirement	Note
1	Hong Kyung-mo	February 1973	February 1979	—N/a
2	Hong Kyung-mo	February 1973	February 1979	—N/a
3	Choi Se-kyung	February 1979	July 1980	—N/a
4	Lee Won-hong	July 1980	February 1985	—N/a
5	Lee Won-hong	July 1980	February 1985	—N/a
6	Park Hyun-tae	February 1985	August 1986	—N/a
7	Jung Koo-ho	August 1986	November 1988	—N/a
8	Seo Young-hoon	November 1988	March 1990	—N/a
9	Seo Ki-won	April 1990	March 1993	—N/a
10	Hong Doo-pyo	March 1993	April 1998	—N/a
11	Hong Doo-pyo	March 1993	April 1998	—N/a
12	Park Kwon-sang	20 April 1998	10 March 2003	—N/a
13	Park Kwon-sang	20 April 1998	10 March 2003	—N/a
14	Seo Dong-koo	22 March 2003	2 April 2003	—N/a
15	Jung Yeon-joo	28 April 2003	11 August 2008	Dismissed
16	Jung Yeon-joo	28 April 2003	11 August 2008	Dismissed
17	Jung Yeon-joo	28 April 2003	11 August 2008	Dismissed
18	Lee Byung-soon	28 August 2008	23 November 2009	—N/a
19	Kim In-kyoo	24 November 2009	23 November 2012	—N/a
20	Kil Hwan-young	23 November 2012	10 June 2014	Dismissed after strike
21	Jo Dae-hyun	28 July 2014	23 November 2015	—N/a
22	Ko Dae-young	24 November 2015	23 January 2018	Dismissed after strike
23	Yang Seung-dong	9 April 2018	23 November 2018	—N/a
24	Yang Seung-dong	24 November 2018	9 December 2021	—N/a
25	Kim Eui-chul	10 December 2021	12 September 2023	Dismissed
26	Park Min (journalist)	12 November 2023	9 December 2024	
27	Park Jang-beom	10 December 2024	present	

== Channels ==
=== Terrestrial television ===
Name	Logo	Description
KBS1		The flagship channel of KBS. It broadcasts news and current affairs, education, drama, sports, children's programming and culture. It launched in 1961 as HLKA-TV and is solely funded by the license fee, airing commercial-free. It is available nationally on channel 9, broadcasting via digital terrestrial television. KBS1 also airs public information films and minor entertainment programming.
KBS2		The entertainment channel of KBS. It was launched in 1980 as a replacement for the Tongyang Broadcasting Company, which was forced by the government to merge into KBS. KBS2 is available on digital channel 7 via digital terrestrial television. KBS2 also airs live sports coverage, children's programming, public information films and limited amounts of news, current affairs and drama programming.
KBS News 24		The news channel of KBS. It was launched in 2010 as a webcast channel. It was available on digital channel 7 via digital terrestrial television from 2021 to 2023, returning to be a FAST channel after July 2023.
KBS UHD		The Ultra High-Definition channel, using the ATSC 3.0 format. The channel airs music videos, plus re-runs of TV series and various programming.

KBS1 and KBS2 switched to digital, phasing out analogue services on 31 December 2012. However, both channels reportedly continued to be unofficially broadcast in analogue via UHF, presumably near the DMZ, albeit using the SECAM D/K standard.

=== Cable and satellite television ===
- KBS Life – A culture and drama channel, it launched in 1995 as KBS Satellite 2. It was renamed KBS Korea in 2002, KBS Prime in 2006 and KBS N Life in 2015 before becoming KBS Life.
- KBS Drama – Formerly KBS Sky Drama, launched in 2002.
- KBS N Sports – Formerly KBS Sports/KBS Sky Sports, launched before the 2002 FIFA World Cup.
- KBS Joy – A comedy and quiz show channel, launched in 2006.
- KBS Kids – A children's channel, launched in 2012.
- KBS Story – A channel aimed at a female audience, launched in 2013.

These channels are managed and operated by KBS N, a subsidiary of KBS. 100+ cable operators operate in the country while Skylife is the sole satellite television service provider.

=== KBS World ===

is the international television and radio service of KBS. It launched on 1 July 2003. It broadcasts on a 24-hour schedule with programs including news, sports, dramas, entertainment and children's shows. KBS World Television is broadcast locally and around the world. As of July 2007, around 65% of its programs are broadcast with English subtitles. It is available in 32 countries, and reportedly more than 40 million households around the world can access KBS World. It has two overseas subsidiaries: KBS America and KBS Japan. KBS Japan is independently operated by a KBS subsidiary in Japan, and most programs are provided with Japanese subtitles.

KBS World Television mainly broadcasts programs commissioned for KBS's 2 terrestrial networks: KBS1 and KBS2. KBS World Television is distributed over international communication and broadcasting satellites. Local cable and/or satellite operators receive the signal from one of these satellites and carry it to subscribers of their own networks. KBS does not allow individual viewers to receive the signal from most satellites. The signal from Badr 6 and Eutelsat Hotbird 13A is Free-to-Air.

KBS World TV commenced its service via YouTube in 2007. Its subscriber count reached 10 million in May 2019 and 13.5 million in July 2020. KBS World TV is available on Facebook, Twitter, Instagram and LINE. Its social media handles surpassed 20 million subscribers in April 2020.

KBS Korea (previously KBS World 24), a spin-off channel of KBS World, is targeted at Koreans living overseas.

=== Radio ===
- KBS Radio 1 (711 kHz AM/97.3 MHz FM KBS Radio Seoul) – News, current affairs, drama, documentary, and culture. the Flagship talk station of KBS, Launched in 1927 as Gyeongseong Broadcasting Corporation JODK, it became HLKA in 1947 and KBS Radio 1 in 1981.
- KBS Radio 2 (603 kHz AM/106.1 MHz FM KBS Happy FM) – Flagship FM station of KBS, Popular music. Launched in 1948 as HLSA.
- KBS Radio 3 (1134 kHz AM/104.9 MHz FM KBS Voice of Love FM) – Launched in 1980 and ceased broadcasting in 1981. It was later replaced by KBS Radio 2's regional radio service and Educational FM (now EBS FM). It was re-launched in 2000 as a spin-off from KBS Radio 2. For the first time in 2010, it was launched on FM and restructured as a radio station for the disabled.
- KBS 1FM (93.1 MHz Classic FM) – Classical music and folk music. Launched in 1979 as KBS Stereo, adopted current name in 1980.
- KBS 2FM (89.1 MHz/DMB CH 12B Cool FM) – Entertainment and news. Launched in 1966 as Radio Seoul Broadcasting (RSB), renamed TBC-FM in the 1970s and KBS Radio 4 in 1980 after TBC-FM forced merger to KBS. The current name was adopted in 2003.
- KBS Hanminjok Radio (literal meaning: KBS Korean Nationality Radio) (6.015 MHz shortwave and 1170 kHz mediumwave) – Launched in 1975 as KBS Third Programme.
- KBS World Radio – The South Korean international radio service, funded directly by the government.

== Logo history ==
First KBS logo (from 15 October 1961 until 1 March 1973)

Second KBS logo (from 2 March 1973 until 28 October 1984)

Third and current KBS text logo (from 29 October 1984 to present)

1984-1985 logo

1985-2001 logo

2001 logo

Unused Fourth KBS logo (2023)

== Operational status ==
=== Headquarters ===
KBS carried out organizational reform on 1 March 2019 to strengthen KBS capabilities of content creation; enhance digital work flow; and improve audience services. KBS created Content Production 2 Division that is responsible for production, marketing, as well as content businesses. The new division aims to bring outstanding dramas and entertainment programming by boosting creative nature of the production function, and minimizing its decision-making process.

The strategy introduced Public Service Media Strategy team under Strategy and Planning Division. Public Service Media Strategy is mainly responsible for developing KBS's digital programs via assorted digital media platforms. The reform brought changes in Programming Division as Digital Media department expanded its roles. Digital News department attached to News and Sports Division strengthened its functions. Another significant change is that the 'Audience Relations Center' has become an executive department, operated directly by KBS President and CEO. The Audience Relations Center dedicates its resources to enhance audience services, and create participation opportunities for audiences. Local Stations Management was reorganized to be supervised under KBS Executive Vice President, in response to a growing demand for greater regional autonomy.

== Criticism ==
In 2001, 90% of the foreign feature films shown on the two terrestrial KBS networks were American in origin, which, according to the statistics released by KOBACO and shared by screen quota organization Quota Yeondae, harmed KBS's image as the national public broadcaster.

During the sinking of MV Sewol in 2014, KBS was heavily criticized for having a pro-government stance in the aftermath of the incident. While other outlets such as SBS were seen as anti-government, no Korean media outlet was seen as "neutral".

== See also ==
- Educational Broadcasting System
- KBS World Radio
- KBS America
- KBS World Canada
- KBS Symphony Orchestra
- KBS Hall
- Television in South Korea
- Korean Central Broadcasting Committee (equivalent in North Korea)
