= List of Légion d'honneur recipients by name (P) =

The French government gives out the Legion of Honour awards, to both French and foreign nationals, based on a recipient's exemplary services rendered to France, or to the causes supported by France. This award is divided into five distinct categories (in ascending order), i.e. three ranks: Knight, Officer, Commander, and two titles: Grand Officer and Grand Cross. Knight is the most common and is awarded for either at least 20 years of public service or acts of military or civil bravery. The rest of the categories have a quota for the number of years of service in the category below before they can be awarded. The Officer rank requires a minimum of eight years as a Knight, and the Commander, the highest civilian category for a non-French citizen, requires a minimum of five years as an Officer. The Grand Officer and the Grand Cross are awarded only to French citizens, and each requires three years' service in their respective immediately lower rank. The awards are traditionally published and promoted on 14 July.

The following is a non-exhaustive list of recipients of the Legion of Honour awards, since the first ceremony in May 1803. 2,550 individuals can be awarded the insignia every year. The total number of awards is close to 1 million (estimated at 900,000 in 2021, including over 3,000 Grand Cross recipients), with some 92,000 recipients alive today. Only until 2008 was gender parity achieved amongst the yearly list of recipients, with the total number of women recipients since the award's establishment being only 59 at the end of the second French empire and only 26,000 in 2021.

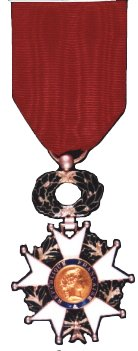

Recipient	Dates (birth – death)	General work & reason for the recognition	Award category (date)
James Pacillo		One of the 100 selected D-Day veterans	TBA (6 June 2004)
Boris Pahor			TBA
Louis Alexandre Pajot			Knight (22 October 1959)
John Painter (supercentenarian)			TBA
Euzhan Palcy		style="white-space: nowrap; text-align:left"| TBA	
Arthur Philippe	TBA		
Orhan Pamuk		Turkish writer	TBA
Maurice Papon	1910–2007	After being convicted for crimes against humanity in 1998-99 for his role during Vichy was dismissed from the order. on	TBA (Awarded:1961 Dismissed: 18 November 1999)
Asha Pandey			TBA
Paul Paray			TBA
Jacques Parisot	1882-1967	social medicine	Grand Cross
Jacques Parizeau			TBA
Robert M. Parker, Jr.			TBA
Tony Parker			TBA
Jack Parrot		D-Day veteran	TBA (2018)
Arvo Pärt	1935 - Present	Estonian composer	Knight (2011)
Earle E. Partridge			TBA
Louis Pasteur	1822–1895	French chemist	Grande Croix
Harry Patch	1898–2009	Last surviving British veteran of the trenches (World War I)	TBA (1995)
George S. Patton		American general	TBA
Samuel Paty	1973-2020	French middle-school teacher who was murdered on 16/10/2020 and posthumously given the award.	TBA
Gen Paul			TBA
Benjamin Pavard		World Cup winning footballer	TBA
Luciano Pavarotti			TBA
George Pearce			TBA
Ernest Peddell	1899–2000	Australian Private, 2nd Battalion, Australian Imperial Force;	TBA (1998)
Barthélémy Pedinielli		Belonged to the 3rd Algerian Tirailleurs Regiment. Recognised for his commitment during the Second World War alongside the Free French forces.	Knight
Malik Peiris		Hong Kong doctor/professor	TBA
Ernest Peixotto	1869–1940	American illustrator and travel writer	TBA
Claiborne Pell		United States Senator	TBA
Alphonse Frédéric Pellerin	1833–1912	French civil engineer	Knight (25 July 1905)
John Lysaght Pennefather			TBA
Jacques Pépin	1935 - Present	Chef	Knight
Ronald Perelman	1942 - Present	American businessman	TBA (1992)
Jacques Perfettini			TBA
Catherine-Dominique de Pérignon			TBA
Lester James Peries		Prolific Sri Lankan film director and recipient of Srilankabhimanya	TBA
František Peřina			TBA
Eva Perón	1919–1952	First Lady of Argentina (1946-1952) and Spiritual Leader of the Nation of Argentina (1952–Present Day).	TBA (1947)
Joseph-Xavier Perrault			TBA
Jean Baptiste Perrin			TBA
Philippe Perrin			TBA
John J. Pershing			TBA
Peter I of Serbia			TBA
Peter II of Yugoslavia			TBA
Pedro II of Brazil			TBA
Zinovy Peshkov			TBA
Edmund Phelps		Director of the Center on Capitalism and Society.	TBA
Edmund S. Phelps			TBA
Henri Félix Emmanuel Philippoteaux	1815–1884	painter	TBA
Sir Eric Phipps	1875–1945	British ambassador to Berlin (1933–36) and Paris (1936–39).	TBA
Frank Pickersgill			TBA
François-Édouard Picot			TBA
Abbé Pierre			TBA
Desmond Piers			TBA
Wallace Pike	1899–1999	Canadian WWI veteran of the Royal Newfoundland Regiment.	TBA (1998)
Józef Pilsudski			TBA
Max L. Pilliard			TBA
Honoré Le Pimpec			TBA
Harold Pinter	1930–2008	British writer and political activist.	TBA (2007)
Robert Pires	1973 - Present	French world cup winning football player	TBA
Tadeusz Piskor			TBA
Pedro José Amadeo Pissis		French geologist	TBA
Élisabeth Platel	1959 – present	Étoile and later director of the Paris Opera Ballet	Officer (30 January 2008)
Michel Platini			TBA
Georges René Le Peley de Pléville			TBA
Henri Poincaré	1854–1912		Officer in 1894, then Commander in 1903
Paul Pogba			TBA
James H. Polk			TBA
Elena Poniatowska			TBA
Józef Antoni Poniatowski			TBA
Lily Pons			TBA
Lazare Ponticelli	1897–2008	Italian-born French veteran of World War I and supercentenarian.	TBA
Monique Pool	1964-	Dutch-born Surinamese environmentalist	TBA
Elvira Popescu	1894–1993	Romanian-born French actress.	TBA
Paolo Portoghesi			TBA
Marjorie Merriweather Post			TBA
Stanisław Kostka Potocki			TBA
William Didier-Pouget	1864–1959	French artist	Officer
Colin Powell			TBA
William C. Powers	1946–2019	President of the University of Texas at Austin.	TBA
Ignacy Pradzynski			TBA
Cedric Prakash			TBA
Alain Prost		Four-time Formula One champion	TBA
Gilbert Pritzel			TBA
Moshe Prywes	1914–1998	Israeli physician and educator; first President of Ben-Gurion University of the Negev.	TBA
Denys Puech			TBA
Bill Purple		World War II Airforce Pilot	Knight (13 September 2013)
Radomir Putnik			TBA
Daniel Pauly	2017	Marine biologist	Chevalier de la Légion D’Honneur
Prince Camille Armand Jules Marie de Polignac	1832-1913	French Major General during the Franco-Prussian War, awarded in 1870	Chevalier de la Légion D’Honneur

== See also ==
- Legion of Honour
- List of Legion of Honour recipients by name
- List of foreign recipients of Legion of Honour by name
- List of foreign recipients of the Legion of Honour by country
- List of British recipients of the Legion of Honour for the Crimean War
- Legion of Honour Museum
- Ribbons of the French military and civil awards
- War Cross (France)
