= Indraprastha College for Women =

Constituent college of University of Delhi

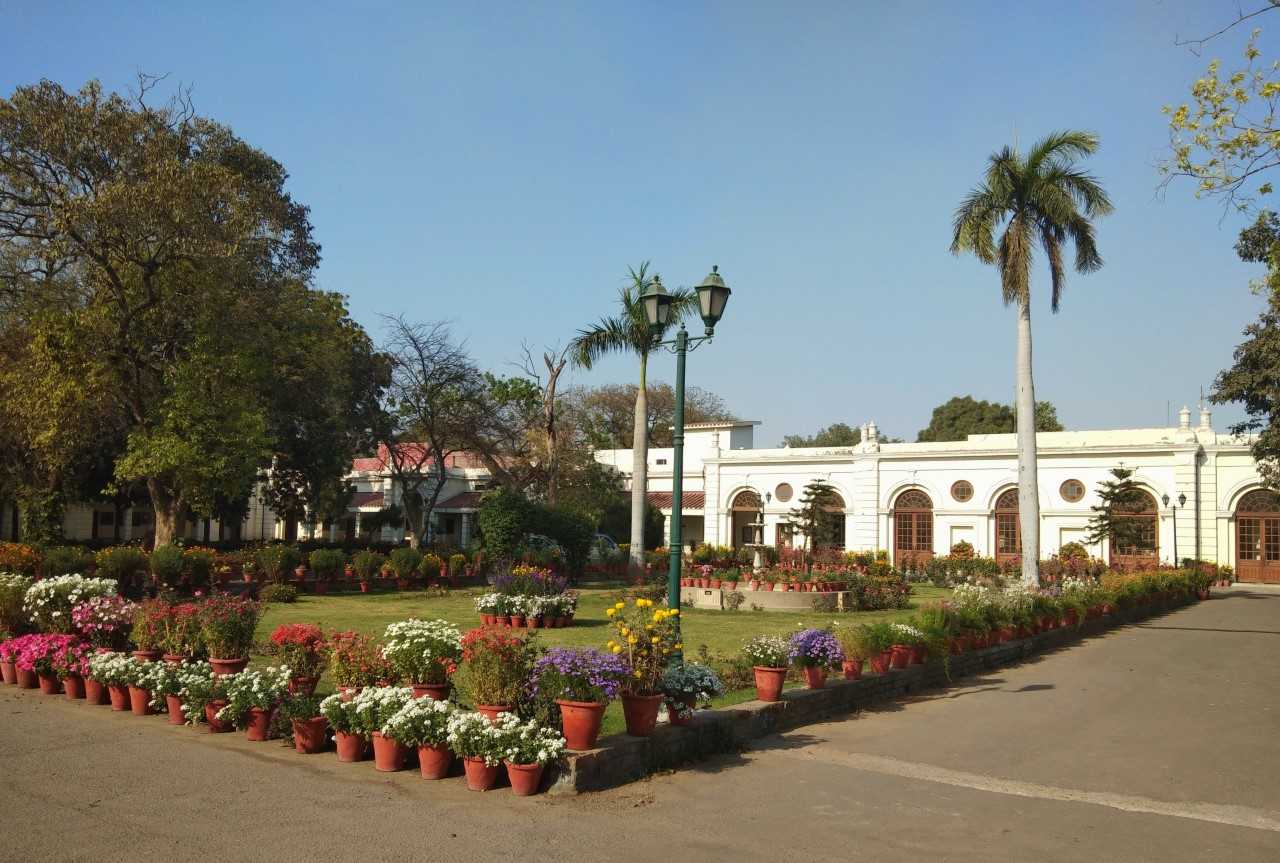
- Motto: "Truth Love Knowledge Service"
- Established: 1924; 102 years ago
- Academic affiliations: University of Delhi
- Principal: Poonam Kumria
- Location: 31, Sham Nath Marg, Civil Lines (near Civil Lines Metro Station), Delhi, 110054, India
- Campus: Urban, 21 acres (85,000 m^{2})
- Website: ipcollege.du.ac.in ipcollege.ac.in

Indraprastha College for Women, also known as Indraprastha College or IP College, is the oldest women's college in Delhi, India. Established in 1924, it is a constituent college of University of Delhi.

The institution offers graduate and post-graduate courses in Economics, Liberal Arts, Commerce, Literature, Computer Science, Multimedia Media and Mass Communication. In 2020, it was ranked 11th among arts colleges in India by India Today.

== History ==
The origins of IP College lie in the Indraprastha Girls School. It was founded in 1904, at the call of noted freedom fighter, educationist and theosophist Annie Besant by a group of Delhi theosophists, led by Lala Jugal Kishore, in Chhipiwara, Old Delhi. Intermediate school was added in 1924 and the Indraprastha College for Women, came into being, with Leonora Gmeiner (from Kapunda, South Australia) as its first principal.

Soon the University of Delhi, which itself was founded in 1922, recognised it as a constituent college. Degree courses were introduced in 1930s and in 1938, the university listed I.P. College as a degree college. After its existence in Chhipiwara during its early years, the college moved to Chandrawali Bhawan, Civil Lines. It moved again to Alipur House at Alipur Road (now Sham Nath Road), the former office of the commander-in-chief in 1938, near Kashmiri Gate, where it is today. The building has become a heritage property.

In 1952, the Kalavati Gupta Hostel named after the second principal of the college was inaugurated.

On 3 July 1984, Diamond Jubilee celebrations of the college were held.

In 2009, a hostel to accommodate 200 students was added on the 1.53-acre (6,200 m^{2}) college premises.

== Campus ==
=== Facilities ===
- Library
- Auditorium
- Information and communications technology (ICT) centre
- Two computer labs
- Audio visual production centre
- Medical room
- Cafeteria
- Two hostels

=== Sports facility ===
- Gymnasium
- Basketball court
- Tennis court
- Badminton court
- Squash court
- Shooting range
- Table tennis
- Judo floor
- Swimming pool

The college offers facilities for other sports as well, such as archery, athletics, handball, volleyball, cricket, and kho-kho.

=== Other amenities ===
- Wi-Fi campus
- Canara Bank branch

== Organisation and administration ==
=== Centres ===
- Centre for Earth Studies
- Museum and Archives Learning Resource Centre
- Translation and Translation Studies Centre
- Centre for Interdisciplinary Studies

== Academics ==
=== Academic programmes ===
==== Undergraduate courses ====
- Economics
- English
- Geography
- Hindi
- History
- Mathematics
- Music
- Philosophy
- Political Science
- Psychology
- Sanskrit
- Sociology
- B.A. Prog.
- Commerce
- Computer Science
- Multimedia and Mass Communication (BMMMC)

==== Graduate courses ====
- Economics
- Geography
- History
- Operational Research
- Psychology
- Mathematics
- Philosophy
- Sanskrit
- English
- Hindi
- Music
- Political Science

=== Financial assistance ===
Students belonging to economically weaker sections are eligible for fee concession. Merit cum means based scholarships are also awarded by the college to deserving students. There is a book bank facility in the library from where needy students can borrow textbooks for the whole academic year. Some special scholarships are also provided by the Delhi University for students belonging to SC/ST/BPL/PWD categories.

== Student life ==
Indraprastha College is the only college of Delhi University to offer the Bachelor in Mass Media and Mass Communication (BMMMC) degree.

In 2005, the college added the cyber cafe wing with offices of National Service Scheme (NSS) and National Cadet Corps (NCC).

In 2014, IP College became one of the first colleges in the University of Delhi to set up a formal Department of Environmental Studies, which is its youngest department.

Every spring, the college celebrates its annual festival, Shruti. Other popular events include the annual debating tournament Vivaad, organised by the English debating society and the annual theatre fest Kirdaar, organised by the Dramatics society.

== Clubs and societies ==
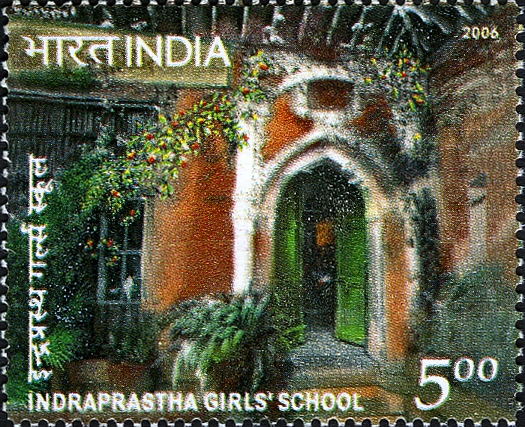
Indraprastha College for Women 2006 stamp of India

- La Cadenza: Western music society
- Abhivyakti: Dramatics society
- Alaap: Indian music society
- Vidath: Hindi editorial society
- Croydon: Fine arts society
- Mridang: Indian dance society
- Oghma: English editorial society
- Ananta: Science society
- English debating society
- Hindi debating society
- Gandhi Study Circle
- Laashya: Contemporary dance society
- Northeast society
- Eco Club
- Enactus IPCW
- NSS & NCC
- Quiz Club
- Simulacra: Film and photography society
- Women's Development Cell (WDC)
- Arthagya: Economics association
- Jeet: Career and guidance cell
- Baithak Society: Music archiving and listening room
- Afroza: Western dance society
- Erudite: quiz society
- IP Vaani: Broadcasting Club of BA Program Department

== Past principals ==
- Leonara G. Miner, first principal, 1924
- Aruna Sitesh (1997–2007)

== Notable alumni ==
- Abhilasha Kumari, first woman Chief Justice of Manipur High Court
- Ajit Iqbal Singh, mathematician
- Ambika Soni, former Ministry of Information and Broadcasting (India)
- Aruna Roy, social activist and recipient of Ramon Magsaysay Award
- Arundhati Virmani, historian
- Asha Pande, first Indian woman to receive the Legion of Honour
- Binalakshmi Nepram, activist from Manipur
- Chitra Narayanan, former IFS officer
- Deepika Singh, television actor
- Deepa Sahi, actress and producer
- Dipannita Sharma, model and Bollywood actress
- Jaspinder Narula, playback singer
- Kamala Laxman, cartoonist
- Kanchan Chaudhary Bhattacharya, first woman Director general of police
- Kavita Kaushik, television actor
- Kunzang Choden, first Bhutanese woman to write a novel
- Kusha Kapila, fashion editor and Internet celebrity
- Madhumita Raut, Odissi dancer
- Meira Kumar, the first woman to become the Speaker of the Lok Sabha
- Nitu Chandra, film actress and model
- Pratima Puri, Doordarshan's first newsreader
- Qurratulain Hyder, Urdu writer
- Rajni Bakshi, freelance journalist
- Rama Vij, actress
- Salma Sultan, news anchor of Doordarshan
- Sharan Rani Backliwal, acclaimed Sarod player, recipient of Padma Shri and Padma Vibhushan
- Shyama Singh, former member of Parliament
- Sucheta Kripalani, former Chief Minister of Uttar Pradesh
- Utsa Patnaik, professor of economics, Jawaharlal Nehru University
- Varsha Dixit, author
- Veena Das, Krieger-Eisenhower Professor of Anthropology, Johns Hopkins University

== Notable faculty ==
- Ra'ana Liaquat Ali Khan, former First Lady of Pakistan
- Tanika Sarkar, professor of history at Jawaharlal Nehru University

== See also ==
- Indraprastha College for Women alumni
- Education in India
- Literacy in India
- List of institutions of higher education in Delhi
