= Pratima Puri =

Indian television news anchor

- Born: Vidya Rawat; Shimla, Punjab Province, British India (present day Himachal Pradesh, India)
- Died: 29 July 2007
- Occupation: News Anchor at Doordarshan
- Years active: 1958 – 1970
- Children: Raja Puri

Pratima Puri (died 29 July 2007) was an Indian journalist best known for being Doordarshan's first newsreader.

== Early life ==
Puri was born as Vidya Rawat to a Garhwali family at Brighton Estate near Laal Paani in Shimla, the capital city of Himachal Pradesh. She graduated from Delhi University's Indraprastha College for Women.

== Career ==
Puri started her media career at the All India Radio (AIR) station in her hometown.

When All India Radio had its first telecast on 15 September 1959, Puri was shifted to New Delhi. She became an anchor when DD started its first news bulletin in 1965. She interviewed prominent figures like Yuri Gagarin (the first man to travel into space), and various actors and politicians. After Salma Sultan was chosen to replace her, Puri started training aspiring anchors in Doordarshan.

== Death and Legacy ==
Pratima Puri died in 2007. She is considered a pioneer for women in journalism in India. She is portrayed in the biographical drama streaming television series Rocket Boys by Priya Raina.
