= Dharampal =

Indian author and activist (1922-2006)

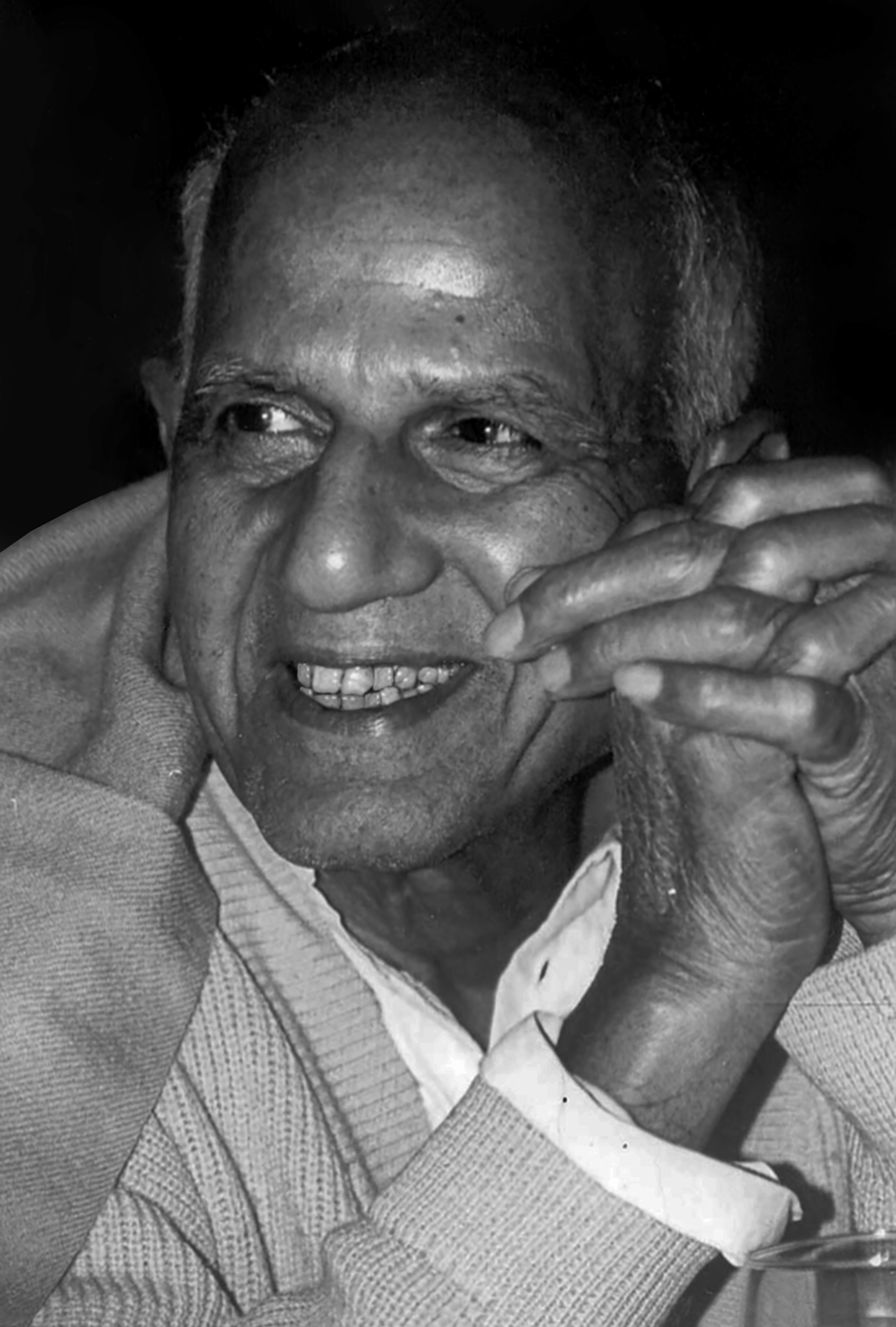
- Born: 19 February 1922; Kandhla, United Provinces of Agra and Oudh, British India
- Died: 24 October 2006 (aged 84)

Dharampal (19 February 1922 – 24 October 2006) was an Indian historian.

== Early life ==
According to Rajni Bakshi of The Indian Express, Dharampal was born in 1922 in what is today Muzaffarnagar district, Uttar Pradesh.

== Career ==
In 1944 he joined Mirabehn, Kisan Ashram near Roorkee-Haridwar, followed by Bapugram near Rishikesh. In 1950 he left the field to start research and writing.

He was married to Phyllis Ellen Ford in 1949, and the couple had three children Pradeep, Gita and Anjali. Gita Dharmpal (b. 1952), retired as Professor and Head of, the Department of History, South Asia Institute, Heidelberg University, and became Council Member of Indian Council of Social Science Research and Honorary Dean of Research at the Gandhi Research Foundation (GRF), Jalgaon

Post Indo-China War of 1962, wherein India suffered losses, he along with N.N. Datta and Roop Narain, signed an open letter against the response of the Jawaharlal Nehru government on November 21, 1962. This led to the arrest of all three, and subsequent imprisonment in the Tihar Jail in Delhi for 2 months, causing much public debate.

Post 1981, he largely lived in Mahatma Gandhi's ashram Sevagram Ashram Pratishthan near Wardha. His wife died in 1986, later he died in 2006.

In 2001, he was named chairman of the National Commission on Cattle and Minister of State by the Government of India.

== Works and reception ==
Dharampal's primary works are based on documentation by the colonial government on Indian education, agriculture, technology, and arts during the period of colonial rule in India. He is most known for his works The Beautiful Tree: Indigenous Indian Education in the Eighteenth Century (1983), Indian Science and Technology in the Eighteenth Century (1971) and Civil Disobedience and Indian Tradition (1971), among other seminal works, which have led to a radical reappraisal of conventional views of the cultural, scientific and technological achievements of Indian society at the eve of the establishment of Company rule in India. Dharampal was instrumental in changing the understanding of pre-colonial Indian education system.

== Bibliography ==
- The Beautiful Tree: Indigenous Indian Education in the Eighteenth Century (1983)
- Indian Science and Technology in the Eighteenth Century (1971)
- Civil Disobedience and Indian Tradition (1971)
- Bharatiya Cit Manas Kala (Hindi), 1991
- Angrazon se Pehale ka Bharat (Hindi)
- Bharat ka Svadharma, Itihas Vartaman aur Bhavishya ka Sandarbha (Hindi), 1994.
- Despoliation and Defaming of India - The Early Nineteenth Century British Crusade (1999)
- Bharat Ki Pehchaan (Hindi), 2003
- Rediscovering India (2003)
- Understanding Gandhi (2003)
- The British Origin of Cow-slaughter in India (2003)
- Understanding Gandhi (2003)
