= Jagadish Chandra Dey =

Indian surrealist painter and printmaker (1942–2023)

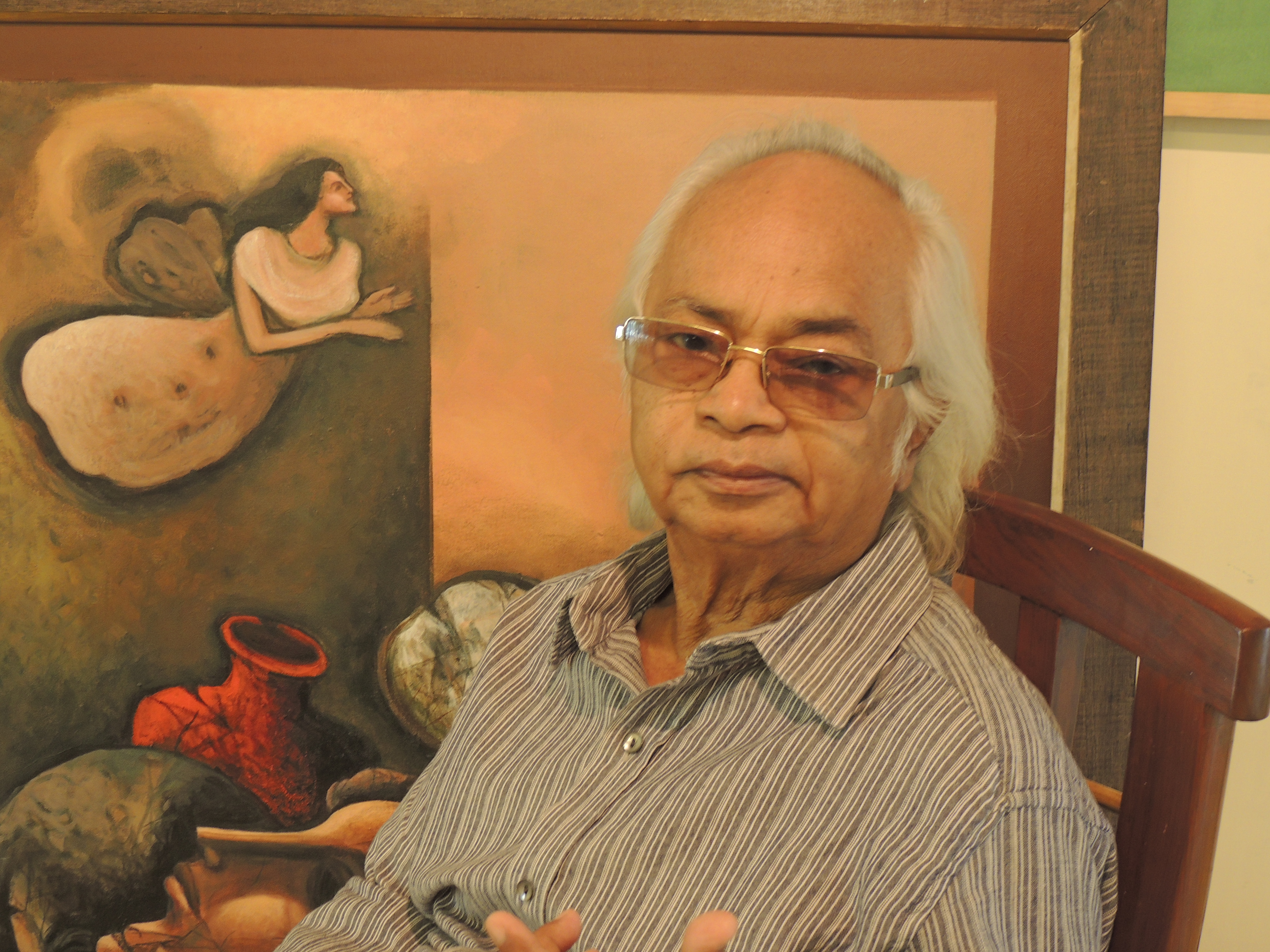
- Jagadish Chandra Dey at his studio
- Born: Jagadish Chandra Dey; 1 June 1942; Sylhet, Bangladesh
- Died: 22 February 2023 (aged 80); Gurgaon, India
- Education: College of Art, Delhi
- Known for: Painting
- Awards: Lalit Kala Akademi (2000); Friends of Liberation War Honour (2013)

Jagadish Chandra Dey, also known as Jagdish Dey, is an Indian painter and printmaker, known for his unique style of surrealism, where the real and unreal coexist. He has been a member of many art societies and juries.

== Early life ==
Jagadish Chandra Dey was born in 1942 in Sylhet (Now in Bangladesh). He moved with his family to Assam at an young age, completing his schooling there. He Graduated from School of Art, Delhi Polytechnic (Now College of Art, Delhi) in 1963. After a short stint in advertising, he joined College of Art, Delhi as a Faculty member in 1965. During his early years, he worked with other eminent Indian artists such as Manjit Bawa, Umesh Varma and Gokal Dembi.

== Notable work ==
He has held 13 Solo art exhibitions at the Taj Art Gallery (Mumbai), Jehangir Art Gallery (Mumbai), Dhoomimal Art Gallery (New Delhi), Sanskriti Art Gallery (Kolkata) and Jharokha Art Gallery (New Delhi), amongst others.

Since 1961 he has participated in more than 100 group exhibitions across India and world over, such as:

- Tokyo Biennale
- Triennale in Mauritius
- Art exhibitions in Mexico
- AIFACS member Exhibition at Bloomsbury Gallery University of London and Sharjah (1988)
- National Art exhibitions
- AIFACS exhibitions
- Annual Art Exhibitions of Sahitya Kala Parishad, Delhi
- ‘’Appreciable Art’’ organized by Dhoomimal Gallery at India Habitat Centre, New Delhi
- Display and Sale of artworks contributed by Indian contemporary artists, organized by SAHMAT to raise funds for relief and rehabilitation of the victims of Genocide in the Land of Mahatma Gandhi, New Delhi (2002)
- Half a Foot Square, exhibition of Indian contemporary art in Miniature format, Dhoomimal Art Centre (2002)
- Kite-a celebration of freedom, organized jointly by Dhoomimal Art Centre and India Habitat Centre, New Delhi (2003)
- Swaran-Rekha, Triennale
- National Awardees exhibition, Lalit Kala Akademi, New Delhi (2004)
- 51 Indian Contemporary Artists at Lalit Kala Akademi, New Delhi (2010)
- Reunion of ‘The Six’ art exhibition at AIFACS in 2018 with notable Indian Painters such as Shri Durga Prasad, Shri Gokal Dembi, Shri Neelmony Chatterjee and Shri Umesh Varma. The exhibition also hosted paintings of noted Indian painter, Late Shri Manjit Bawa.

He has also taken part in many art workshops including Printmaking Workshop under Prof. Paul Lingren, Director Smithsonian Printmaking Association, Washington, in 1970; Viscosity Printing with Prof. Krishna Reddy at a workshop organized by Lalit Kala Akademi at Garhi studio in 1985, along with participation in various Art Camps such as the one organised by TATA Steel in Jamshedpur in 2000; Artists Camp for Harsh Goenka in Mumbai, organized by Vikram Sethi in 2003.

== Awards ==
- “Friends of Liberation War Honour” by the honourable Prime Minister of Bangladesh, Sheikh Hasina in 2013
- National Akademi Award by Lalit Kala Academy, in 2000
- AIFACS Awards in 1977, 1969 and 1982
- Sahitya Kala Parishad Award in 1981, 1982 and 1989
- Honoured by the title of 'KALA SHREE' by AIFACS
- Senior Fellowship in Visual Art (1998-2000) by the Ministry of Human Resource Development, Govt. of India

== Collections ==
Rashtrapati Bhawan, National Gallery of Modern Art, Lalit Kala Akademi, Bharat Bhavan, HUDCO, Glenbara Museum - Japan, Smithsonian Institution - Washington D.C., Taj Mahal Hotels - India, Air India, TATA Steel, Sahitya Kala Parishad, ITC, Birla Academy - Kolkata and many other private collections.

== Membership ==
- Council Member and Vice President of All India Fine Arts and Craft Society (AIFACS)
- Founder Member of ‘The Six’, Group 8, Gallery 26 and Vermillion
- Member of the erstwhile Delhi Shilpi Chakra
- Member, purchase committee for Kala Mela, Lalit Kala Akademi, New Delhi (1977)
- Nominated Chairman of the Jury at 47th National Exhibition of Art by Lalit Kala Akademi (2004)
- Jury Member for AIFACS National Exhibition (2005)
- Nominated Jury member at National Exhibition of Art by Lalit Kala Akademi (2015)
