= Sahitya Kala Parishad =

- Formation: 31 July 1975; 51 years ago
- Type: Governmental
- Headquarters: Satsang Vihar Marg, Qutab Institutional Area, New Delhi
- Location: New Delhi, India
- Region served: India
- Parent organisation: Ministry of Culture, Government of India
- Website: skpdelhi.in

Sahitya Kala Parishad (साहित्य कला परिषद) (Academy of Performing and Fine Arts) is the Cultural wing of the Govt. of National Capital Territory of Delhi (NCT) of Delhi for music, dance, drama & fine arts, established in 1968, under the 'Department Of Art, Culture And Language'. It was registered under the Society's Registration Act, 1860 on 31 July 1975.

It works towards fostering, visual arts and inculcate artistic awareness within the NCT of Delhi. As a norm, the Chief Minister of Delhi, remains the Chairperson of the Sahitya Kala Parishad. After, the establishment of Language Academies, like the Sahitya Akademi, its focus has been mainly on performing and visual arts. It has also set up two 'District Cultural Centres', one at Janakpuri and other in Vikaspuri (Bodella Village) in Delhi, the latter set up in collaboration with Delhi Public Library has two auditoriums.

== Activities ==
=== Language Academies ===
The Parishad has over the year established several language academies to promote literature in diverse languages of the state, with the most recent academy, the Maithili- Bhojpuri Academy established on 7 January 2008.

- Hindi Academy (since 1981)
- Punjabi Academy (since 1981)
- Sanskrit Academy (since 1987)
- Sindhi Academy (since 1994)
- Urdu Academy (since 1981)
- Maithili-Bhojpuri Academy (since 2008)

=== Awards ===
Each year, the Parishad gives Awards for excellence in the fields of Performing and Visual Arts, as well as Literature:

- Parishad Samman (Sahitya Kala Parishad Samman), commonly known as the Sahitya Kala Parishad Award
- Mohan Rakesh Samman

=== Sahitya Kala Parishad Award recipients ===
The Sahitya Kala Parishad's recipients of the Sahitya Kala Parishad Award, officially known as Parishad Samman in music, dance, theatre, fine art, photography and overall contribution.

Category	Recipient	Award year
Music	Chans Khan	1969–70
Music	Dilip Chandra Vedi	1972–73
Music	Sharan Rani Backliwal	1973–74
Music	Siddheshwari Devi	1974–75
Music	Jyotindra Maitra	1975–76
Music	Emani Sankara Sastry	1976–77
Music	Purushottam Das	1976–77
Music	Amjad Ali Khan	1978–79
Music	Dagar Bandhu	1979–80
Music	Ahmed Raza	1980–81
Music	R. B. Ishwaran	1981–82
Music	Anil Biswas	1982–83
Music	Sabri Khan	1983–84
Music	Sushil Das Gupta	1983–84
Music	Sarfaraz Hussain Khan	1984–85
Music	Satish Bhatia	1984–85
Music	Singh Bandhu (Tejpal Singh and Surinder Singh)	1985–86
Music	V. C. Moudgalya	1985–86
Music	Naina Devi	1986–87
Music	Amar Nath	1986–87
Music	Shanti Hiranand	1988–89
Music	Asad Ali Khan	1988–89
Music	Sumati Mutatkar	1989–90
Music	Faiyaz Khan	1989–90
Music	Uma Shankar Mishra	1990–91
Music	Madiri Mangalam Ramachandranan	1990–91
Music	Debu Chaudhuri	1991–92
Music	Hafeez Ahmed Khan	1991–92
Music	Rahim Fahimuddin Dagar	1995–96
Music	T. R. Subramaniam	1995–96
Music	Inder Lal Dhandra	2000–01
Music	Sunil Mukherjee	2000–01
Music	Mani Prasad	2001–02
Music	Laxman Krishnarao Pandit	2001–02
Dance	Indrani Rehman	1972–73
Dance	Birju Maharaj	1973–74
Dance	Singhajeet Singh	1974–75
Dance	Narendra Sharma	1975–76
Dance	Lalita Shastri	1976–77
Dance	Uma Sharma	1977–78
Dance	Yamini Krishnamurthy	1978–79
Dance	Bhagwan Das Verma	1979–80
Dance	Krishna Chandra Naik	1980–81
Dance	Mohan Lal	1981–82
Dance	Sonal Mansingh	1982–83
Dance	Maya Rao	1983–84
Dance	Mayadhar Raut	1983–84
Dance	Kiran Segal	1984–85
Dance	Nana Kasar	1985–86
Dance	Durga Lal	1985–86
Dance	Raja and Radha Reddy	1986–87
Dance	Reba Vidyarathi	1987–88
Dance	Swapansundari	1988–89
Dance	Charu Mathur	1988–89
Dance	Sadanam Balakrishnan	1988–89
Dance	Bharati Shivaji	1989–90
Dance	Hare Krishna Bahera	1989–90
Dance	K. J. Govindrajan	1990–91
Dance	Saroja Vaidyanathan	1990–91
Dance	K. N. Dakshinamoorthy	1991–92
Dance	Shovana Narayan	1991–92
Dance	Jaya Ramarao & Vanashree	1995–96
Dance	S. Kanaka	1995–96
Dance	Manjushree Chatterjee	2000–01
Dance	Jamuna Krishnan	2000–01
Dance	Munna Shukla	2001–02
Dance	Madhavi Mudgal	2001–02
Theatre	Ramesh Mehta	1972–73
Theatre	I. L. Das	1974–75
Theatre	Ebrahim Alkazi	1975–76
Theatre	H. V. Gupta	1976–77
Theatre	R. G. Anand	1978–79
Theatre	Sheila Bhatia	1979–80
Theatre	Habib Tanvir	1980–81
Theatre	N. C. Jain	1981–82
Theatre	Rajinder Nath	1982–83
Theatre	Ramesh Chandra	1983–84
Theatre	Joy Michael	1983–84
Theatre	Reoti Saran Sharma	1984–85
Theatre	Sitansu Mukherjee	1985–86
Theatre	M. K. Raina	1985–86
Theatre	B. M. Shah	1986–87
Theatre	R. K. Dhingra	1986–87
Theatre	Manohar Singh	1988–89
Theatre	J. N. Kaushal	1988–89
Theatre	Rekha Jain	1988–89
Theatre	Uttara Baokar	1989–90
Theatre	Barry John	1990–91
Theatre	Ranjit Kapoor	1990–91
Theatre	Mohan Upreti	1990–91
Theatre	Ram Gopal Bajaj	1991–92
Theatre	Panchanan Pathak	1991–92
Theatre	Tarsem Lal	1995–96
Theatre	Amal Allana	1995–96
Theatre	Jaidev Tajeja	2000–01
Theatre	Devendra Raj Ankur	2000–01
Theatre	Satish Anand	2001–02
Theatre	Tripurari Sharma	2001–02
Fine art	Dhanraj Bhagat	1969–70
Fine art	Bhavesh Sanyal	1969–70
Fine art	Bimal Das Gupta	1972–73
Fine art	Kanwal Krishan	1973–74
Fine art	Gurucharan Singh	1974–75
Fine art	Bisva Nath Mukherjee	1975–76
Fine art	E. Kumarilswamy	1976–77
Fine art	Prados Das Gupta	1977–78
Fine art	S. Sen Roy	1978–79
Fine art	Ram Kumar	1979–80
Fine art	Biren De	1980–81
Fine art	Satish Gujral	1981–82
Fine art	K. Jaya Apasamy	1982–83
Fine art	Sankho Chaudhuri	1983–84
Fine art	G. R. Santosh	1984–85
Fine art	N. C. Bhattacharya	1984–85
Fine art	K. S. Kulkarni	1984–85
Fine art	Shanti Dave	1985–86
Fine art	Ram V. Sutar	1985–86
Fine art	M. F. Husain	1985–86
Fine art	Krishan Khanna	1986–87
Fine art	Devyani Krishna	1986–87
Fine art	Himmat Shah	1988–89
Fine art	Jaggu Bhai Shah	1989–90
Fine art	A. Ramachandran	1989–90
Fine art	V. S. Gaitonde	1990–91
Fine art	Arpita Singh	1991–92
Fine art	Narendra Srivastava	1991–92
Fine art	J. Swaminathan	1991–92
Fine art	Paramjit Singh	1995–96
Fine art	Anupam Sud	1995–96
Fine art	Serbjeet Singh	2000–01
Fine art	Virendra Singh Rahi	2000–01
Fine art	Jivan Adalja	2001–02
Fine art	Om Prakash Sharma	2001–02
Photography	T. Kashi Nath	1985–86
Photography	Virendra Prabhakar	1985–86
Photography	Avinash Pasricha	1986–87
Photography	O. P. Sharma	1988–89
Photography	Raghu Rai	1990–91
Photography	S. Paul	1991–92
Photography	T. S. Ashok	2000–01
Photography	Sondeep Shankar	2001–02
Overall contribution (individual)	Komala Varadan (multifaceted artist)	1985–86
Overall contribution (individual)	Kiran Seth (promotion of art)	1988–89
Overall contribution (individual)	P. V. Subramanian (dance critic)	1989–90
Overall contribution (individual)	Mohan Khokar (dance historian)	1990–91
Overall contribution (individual)	Sharon Lowen (foreign artist pursuing Indian dance)	1991–92
Overall contribution (individual)	Kapila Vatsyayan (Indian dance and culture)	1991–92
Overall contribution (individual)	S. K. Saxena	1995–96
Overall contribution (individual)	Suresh Awasthi	2000–01
Overall contribution (individual)	Shanta Serbjeet Singh	2001–02
Overall contribution (cultural institution)	Shriram Bharatiya Kala Kendra	1988–89
Overall contribution (cultural institution)	Triveni Kala Sangam	1989–90
Overall contribution (cultural institution)	Raag Rang	1990–91
Overall contribution (cultural institution)	India International Centre	1991–92
Overall contribution (cultural institution)	Chitra Kala Sangam	2000–01
Overall contribution (cultural institution)	Bharatiya Sangeet Sadan	2001–02
Chief Minister's Award	Mohinder Sarin	2001–02

=== Lifetime Achievement Award recipients ===
The following is a list of recipients of the Sahitya Kala Parishad Lifetime Achievement Award.

Recipient	Field	Award year
M. S. Subbulakshmi	Carnatic music	2004–05
Rahim Fahimuddin Dagar	Dhrupad music	2007–08
Ebrahim Alkazi	Theatre and arts	2007–08
Kapila Vatsyayan	Literature, education and creative fields	2008–09
Zohra Sehgal	Creative and performing arts	2008–09
Habib Tanvir	Theatre	2009–10
Bhimsen Joshi	Hindustani classical music	2009–10
Ram Kumar	Arts	2010–11
Viswanathan Anand	Sports	2010–11
Amjad Ali Khan	Classical instrumental music	2011–12
Girija Devi	Light classical music	2011–12
Ruskin Bond	Literature	2011–12
Abdul Rashid Khan	Hindustani classical music	2013–14
Anjolie Ela Menon	Contemporary art	2013–14

=== Scholarships ===
Each year, Sahitya Kala Parishad awards, two-year Scholarships for Advance Training in Music

=== Festival ===
==== Theatre ====
- Bhartendu Natya Utsav
- Nakhat Utsav

==== Music and Dance ====
- Children Jhankar Utsav
- Indraprastha Sangeet Samaroh
- Uday Shankar Nritya Samaroh
- Baisakhi Festival
- Qutub Festival

==== Fine Arts ====
- Annual Art Exhibition
- Sponsored Art Exhibition
- Exhibition of children's work
- Artists Camp

=== Films ===
- Asian Film Festival, Films from across Asia, are screened at different venues in New Delhi.

== See also ==
- Manipuri Sahitya Parishad
- Sahitya Akademi
