= Madhumita Raut =

Indian dancer (1966–2026)

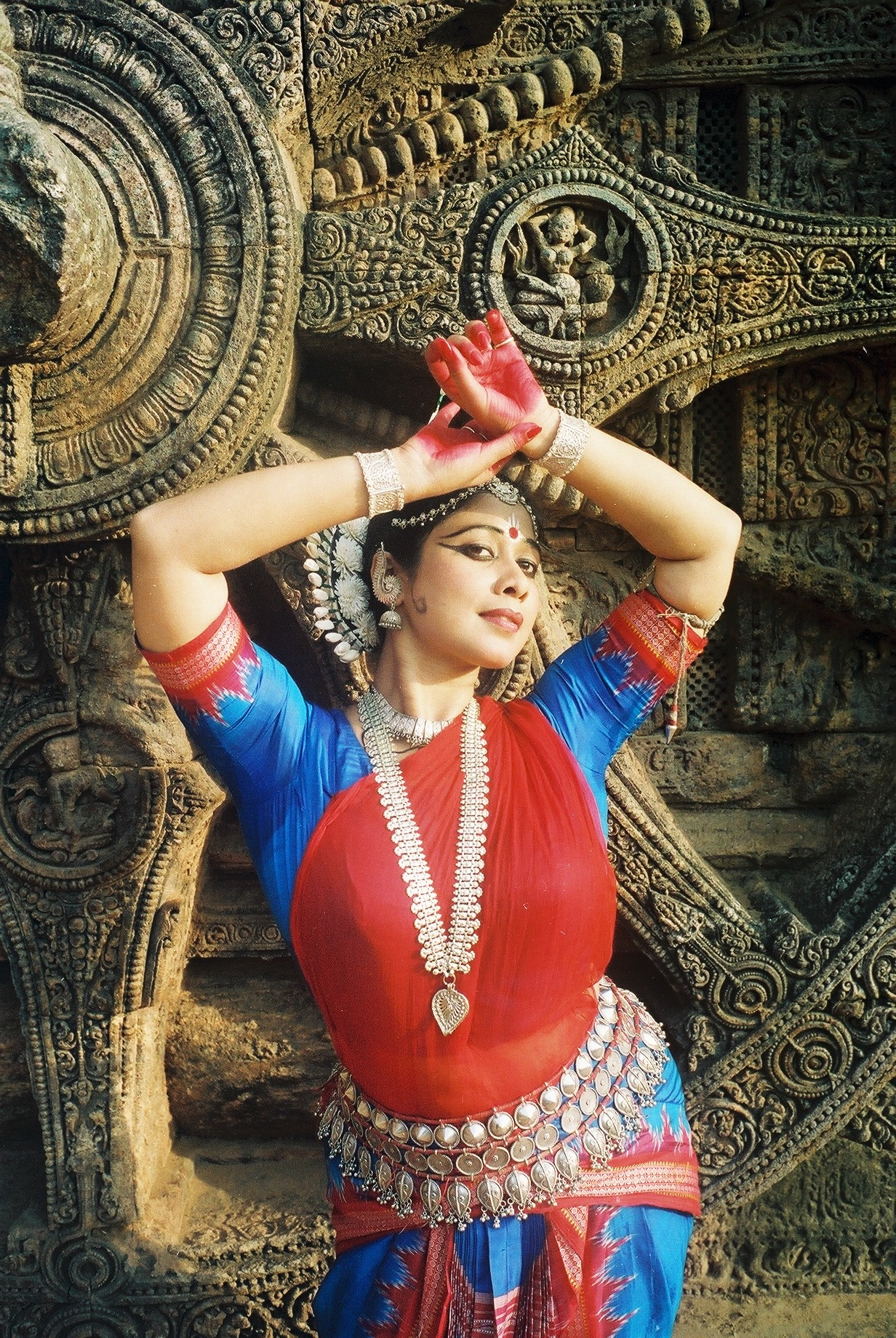
Raut in an Odissi pose at Konark Sun Temple

Madhumita Raut (4 April 1966 – 21 March 2026) was an Indian classical dancer from Odissi. She was the daughter of Mamta Khuntia and Mayadhar Raut, who contributed to the revival of Odissi in the 1950s with Shastra-based knowledge.

Raut lived in Delhi, where she taught at the Jayantika Association's Mayadhar Raut School of Odissi Dance.

== Early life and education ==
Madhumita Raut was raised in Delhi, India. She received her academic qualifications at the Bharatiya Vidya Bhavan's School and Indraprastha College in Delhi.

She had a master's degree in English literature from Delhi University and a diploma in Performing Arts.

== Career ==
Raut worked at Mayadhar Raut Gharana of Odissi. Her works include compositions on poetry, choreographic compositions on poems of Goethe, and fusion dances with Balinese dancer Dia Tantri in the Netherlands. She had used the medium of dance for social causes.

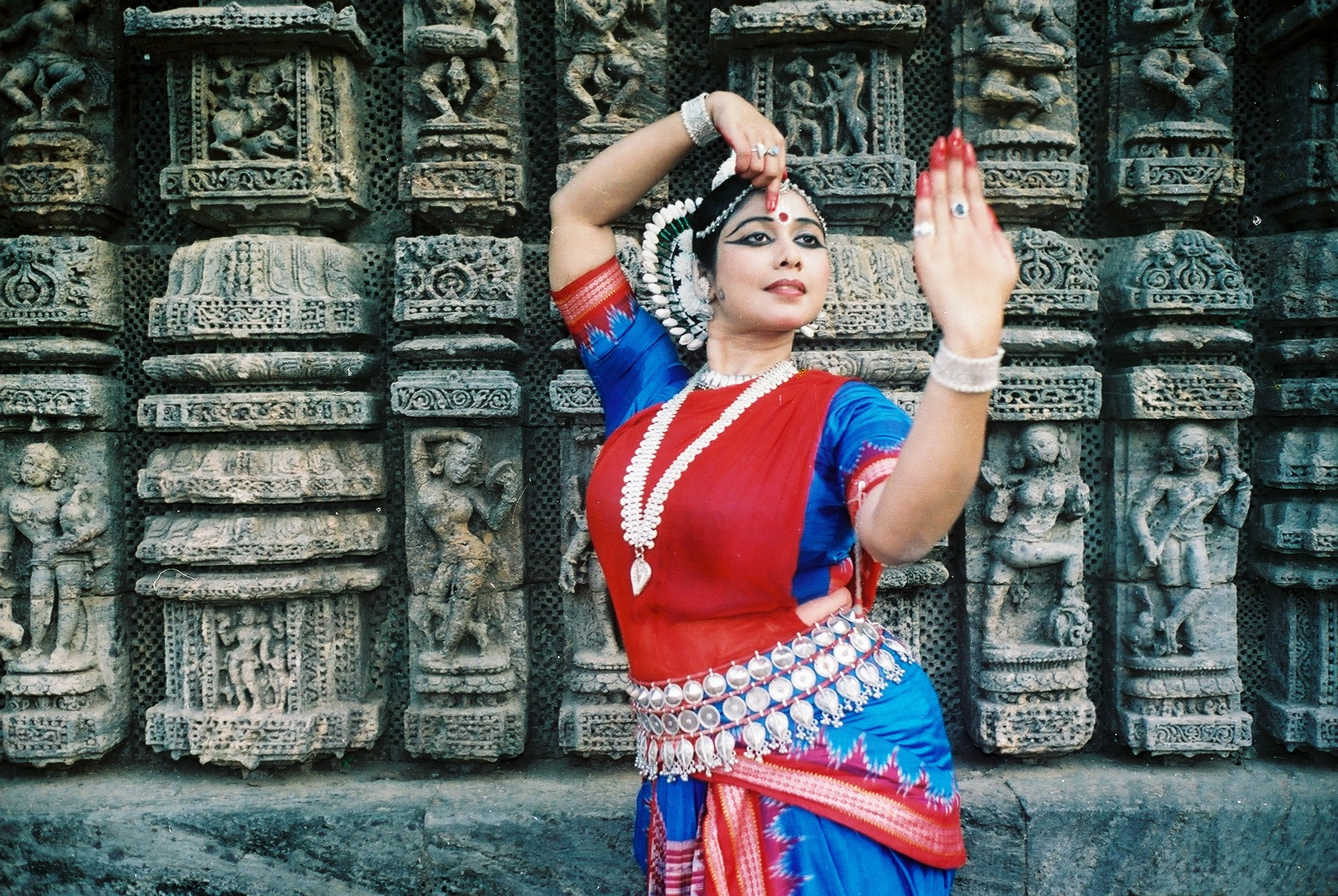
Raut in an Odissi pose at Konark Sun Temple

A Netherlands television company made a documentary film about Madhumita. Stuttgart (Germany) and the Hungarian televisions have featured Raut's dance in their documentary films on India.

She danced in major dance festivals in India, Ireland, England, Scotland, the Netherlands, Germany, Belgium, Hungary, Austria, Spain, Morocco, France, Portugal, Japan, Malaysia and The U.S. She also taught Odissi in The U.S., Netherlands, Japan and Germany.

Raut wrote "Odissi: What, Why and How: Evolution, Revival and Technique", published by B.R. Rhythms, Delhi in 2007.

== Death ==
Raut died from a cardiac arrest on 21 March 2026, at the age of 59. She was survived by younger brothers, Manoj and Manmath.

== Awards ==
Raut received the following awards:

- Orissa State Ghungur Samman 2010
- Utkal Kanya award 2010
- Mahila Shakti Samman 2010
- Bharat Nirman Award 1997
- Odisha Living Legend Award 2011
