= Ajit Iqbal Singh =

Indian mathematician

Ajit Iqbal Singh (born 1943) is an Indian mathematician, specialising in functional analysis and harmonic analysis. Singh is a Fellow of the Indian National Science Academy (INSA), India's apex body of scientists and technologists. She is also a fellow of the National Academy of Sciences (India), based in Allahabad.

== Education ==
Singh completed her under graduation in Mathematics from Indraprastha College and graduated in the same subject from Delhi University in 1963 and 1965, respectively. She earned a PhD in mathematics from the University of Cambridge in 1969. Her dissertation titled 'Contributions to the Theory of Linear Operators in Locally Convex Spaces', was supervised by Frank Smithies. Singh attended Cambridge as a Commonwealth Scholar at Newnham College from 1966 to 1969.

== Career ==
Singh began teaching immediately after completing her master's degree, as faculty at Indraprastha College, Delhi University. On completing her PhD from Cambridge, she returned to Delhi and joined Hindu College. She taught alongside her research in functional analysis and harmonic analysis. In 1974, Singh was appointed reader in mathematics at Delhi University South Campus and continued on as professor from 1984 to 2008. From 2008, she has been a visiting professor at the Indian Statistical Institute, Delhi Centre.

== Work ==
Singh has worked on linear operators in locally convex spaces, topological algebra, spectral synthesis in hypergroups, multipliers and module homomorphisms, semigroup algebras, applications of harmonic analysis to differential equations and orthogonal polynomials, geometry of the range of a vector measure, and quotient rings of algebras of functions and operators.

== Awards and recognition ==
Singh was awarded the Rai Bahadur Brij Mohan Lal Saheb Memorial Gold Medal and the Ravi Kanta Devi Prize from Delhi University.
