= Salma Sultan =

Indian television journalist and director

- Born: 16 March 1947 (age 79)
- Education: Indraprastha College for Women
- Occupation: News anchor at Doordarshan
- Years active: 1967–2005
- Spouse: Aamir Kidwai
- Children: 2

Salma Sultan (born 16 March 1947) is an Indian television journalist and director. Having worked as a news anchor in Doordarshan from 1967 till 1997, she later went into directing television shows. Sultan had initiated a trend-wearing a signature rose tucked under her left ear in her hair, and draping the border of her sari around her neck in a modern yet traditional way. It was later picked up by almost all the women newsreaders.

== Early life and education ==
Salma Sultan was born as second child to scholar and secretary in the Ministry of Agriculture, Mohammed Asghar Ansari, and a homemaker mother. Salma had an elder sister Maimoona Sultan (a four-time Congress Member of Parliament from Bhopal). Salma and Maimoona were great-great-granddaughter of Shah Shuja of Afghanistan. Salma did her schooling and graduation from Bhopal. She did her post graduation in English from Indraprastha College for Women, Delhi and simultaneously gave audition for an announcer on Doordarshan at the age of 23.

== Career ==
Pratima Puri and Gopal Kaul were regular faces then in Doordarshan, which started its operations on 15 September 1959. Doordarshan began a 5-minute news bulletin in 1965. Salma Sultan gave the first news of assassination of Indira Gandhi on Doordarshan's evening news on 31 October 1984, more than 10 hours after she was shot.

=== As director ===
After her retirement, Salma Sultan moved to directing serials on social topics for Doordarshan under her production house Lensview Private Limited. Her serials Panchtantra Se, Suno Kahani, Swar Mere Tumhare and Jalte Sawal drew attention. Panchantra Se used to be telecast soon after Mahabharata in 1989 and did very well. Jalte Sawal was a serial on women issues, which was telecasted in 2004 on DD News on Sundays at 11 a.m.

== Personal life ==
Salma Sultan is widow of Aamir Kidwai, who worked for Engineers India (EIL). Sultan's son Saad Kidwai is an Income Tax Commissioner and her daughter Sana is a choreographer. Salma has two grandchildren. Saad Kidwai is married to Geti Khan Kidwai (born 1978), a designer and they have two children- Samar and Mehar. Saad and Geti are now settled in BRS Nagar, Ludhiana.
