= Varsha Dixit =

Indian author

Varsha Dixit is an Indian author. Her works include the novels Right Fit Wrong Shoe, an English-language love story, intended for adolescents but widely read by adults as well, and Xcess Baggage, a vampire sci-fi romance story.

== Education ==
She attended St. Mary's Convent, Kanpur, received her B.A (Honours) in Political Science from Indraprastha College, New Delhi, pursued a Diploma course in Mass Communications from Sophia Polytechnic, Mumbai, and undertook film editing courses from UCLA extension, Los Angeles.

== Career ==
Her debut book Right Fit Wrong Shoe was released in late 2009 and became a bestseller. Her second book Xcess Baggage, released in 2010, is a vampire sci-fi romance, described by Treesha Datta of The Hindu as "an exciting tale of two beings — one cursed to love and one cursed to live," and is the first vampire romance book from India. In 2012, she released a sequel to Right Fit Wrong Shoe, titled Wrong Means Right End, about which Leah George of The Hindu writes, "The book, breaking usual conventions, deals with matters of bad language and sexual chemistry in a refreshingly straightforward way."

== Works ==
- Dixit, Varsha. Right Fit Wrong Shoe. New Delhi: Rupa & Co, 2009. ISBN 978-81-291-1523-2 OCLC 459616111
- Xcess Baggage (Rupa Publications)
- Wrong Means Right End (Rupa Publications)

== Personal life ==
She has described herself as a "voracious" fiction reader. She originally intended to write a book on serial killers but finding it impossible to maim or kill anyone, even on paper, she penned a romantic story instead. She resides in the U.S. with her family.
