= Arundhati Virmani =

Indian historian

Arundhati Virmani (born 1957) is an Indian historian. She was a reader in history at Delhi University until 1992. She teaches at the École des Hautes Études en Sciences Sociales in Marseille. She is the co-founder of the Biennale Européenne d'Histoire Locale with Jean Boutier.

== Biography ==
Arundhati Virmani was born in New Delhi, in 1957. She did her schooling from Lady Irwin School and Convent of Jesus and Mary, Delhi. She graduated with a degree in history from Indraprastha College. As a student of Delhi University, she obtained a French fellowship in 1981 to prepare her Ph.D. thesis in French history at the Sorbonne in Paris. Under the supervision of Maurice Agulhon, Professor at the Collège de France, she studied the politicization of French rural society after the Restoration and before the institution of male universal suffrage under the Second Republic in 1848. She defended her thesis in September 1984. In 1991, she married Jean Boutier and moved to France. She studied Odissi dance with Madhavi Mudgal.

== Academic career ==
She began her teaching career at Jesus and Mary College and later taught at Delhi University. She was the head of the History section of the School of Correspondence Courses, where she participated in adult education and Long-Distance teaching. Then Reader in European History at the History Department, she taught modern French and European History. In Marseille she taught at Université Paul Cézanne, Euromed-Marseille Business School and Ecole des Hautes Etudes en Sciences Sociales. Since then, her research focused on the colonial period in India, especially the 20th Century; she is also an analyst of the current transformations of Indian society. Her recent work focuses on the idea of a uniform civil code in India. She presented her work at a conference at the Institute of Commonwealth Studies.

She has published several books and many papers in collective works and scientific journals (in England, France and Italy). She has lectured on colonial Indian history in different universities and academic institutions (Paris, Ithaca (USA), London, Berlin, Bologna, Florence, New Delhi, New York, Ann Arbor ... ). She is a research fellow at the Centre Norbert Elias in Marseille.

Virmani has been engaged in consultancy work, specializing in Indo-French intercultural training since 2000. She is a recognized expert for the "Association pour le Progrès du Management". She is interested in Corporate Social Responsibility (CSR) from an Indian perspective.

== Published works ==
Known for her 2008 book, A National Flag for India. Rituals, Nationalism, and the Politics of Sentiment, about which noted writer Khushwant Singh wrote: "She has done meticulous research on the subject and put life into what may appear at first sight as a footnote in a book on Indian history.".

- L'Inde, une puissance en mutation, Paris, La Documentation française, 2001
- India, 1900-1947. Un Britannique au cœur du Raj, Paris, Autrement, 2002 (about Sir Malcolm Lyall Darling (1880–1969), a famous British administrator in India, specialist of land reform and cooperative movement)
- "A National Affair : Nude Bharatmata," Passato e Presente, 2006, n°76
- "Roman de voyage, récit de voyage. L’Inde de Jules Verne, de Pierre Loti et d’Edward M. Forster", 2006, in Alain Guillemain (ed.), A la recherche du meilleur des mondes. Littérature et sciences sociales, Paris, Harmattan
- "Réflexions d’une hindoue convertie au christianisme : Pandita Ramabai (1858-1922) et l’hindouisme", in Daniel Tollet (ed.), La religion que j’ai quittée, Paris, Presses de l’Université Paris-Sorbonne, 2007
- "The Place of Religious Identity in a Modern Nation State – Three Indian Responses", Annuaire de Droits et de Religion, juillet 2008
- A National Flag for India. Rituals, Nationalism, and the Politics of Sentiment, New Delhi, Permanent Black, 2008. ISBN 81-7824-232-X.
- Atlas historique de l'Inde : du VIe siècle av. J.-C. au XXIe siècle, Paris, Autrement, 2012.
- Political Aesthetics : Culture, Critique and the Everyday, New-York, Routledge, 2015.
- Translation of Edward P. Thompson, Les usages de la coutume. Traditions et résistances populaires en Angleterre, XVIIe-XIXe siècles, Paris, coll. Hautes Études, Le Seuil-Gallimard-Éditions de l’École des Hautes Études en Sciences Sociales, 2015 (with Jean Boutier)
- Les Indiens. Voix multiples, Paris, Ateliers Henry Dougier, 2016. ISBN 979-10-93594-18-7 (Prize "Asia" 2015 of the Association of Francophone Writers (Association des Ecrivains de Langue Française-ADELF)
- (ed.), Aesthetics of Power. Culture, Critique, and the Everyday, London, Routledge, 2015.
- (ed.), Aesthetic Perceptions of Urban Environments, London, Routledge, 2022.
- Social scientists in the civic space. Ethical perspectives on democratic involvement, Routledge, Delhi; 2025;(coed. with Jean Boutier and Manohar Kumar) doi: https://doi.org/10.4324/9781003560838
- Économistes et Historiens : Un dialogue de sourds, Paris, Odile Jacob, 2025: (coed. with Alain Trannoy)

Podcasts

- « The Wire Talks : « How our Tiranga was born” https://www.youtube.com/watch?v=Wkk-3YmQbpg
- On India's cultural presence in Europe: YT: https://www.youtube.com/watch?v=usIxnqpfKQI
