= Mayadhar Raut =

Indian classical dancer (1930–2025)

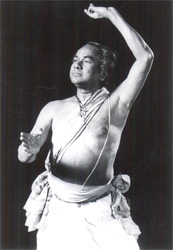
- Guru Mayadhar Raut
- Born: 6 July 1930; Kantapenhara, Cuttack district, Bihar and Orissa Province, British India
- Died: 22 February 2025 (aged 94); Delhi, India
- Occupations: Classical dancer, dance instructor
- Years active: 1955–2025
- Dancing career
- Current group: Jayantika
- Dances: Odissi

Mayadhar Raut (6 July 1930 – 22 February 2025) was an Indian classical Odissi dancer, choreographer and Guru.

== Background ==
Raut was born in the village Kantapenhara an Ahir family in Cuttack district, subsequently he received his dance training under the Guru-shishya tradition of Odissi by Rukmini Devi Arundale at Kalakshetra.

He was married to Mamta Khuntia, who died in 2017, and they had one daughter and two sons; daughter Madhumita Raut is also a noted Odissi dancer.

Raut died in Delhi on 22 February 2025, at the age of 94.

== Career ==
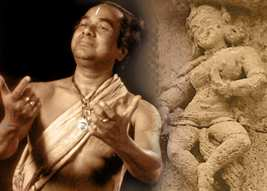
Guru Mayadhar Raut

Mayadhar Raut played a major role in giving Odissi its classical 'shastra'-based status. He introduced Mudra Vinyoga in 1955. His notable compositions include ‘Pashyati Dishi Dishi’ and ‘Priya Charu Shile’, composed in 1961.

Mayadhar Raut was considered a master of Natyashastra and Abhinaya Darpana, and enriched the Abhinaya vocabulary of Odissi. He taught in Kala Vikas Kendra founded by Babulal Josi in Orissa, and trained dancers Surendranath Jena, Hare Krishna Behera and Ramani Ranjan Jena. Raut taught at Shriram Bharatiya Kala Kendra from 1970 until 1995.

As one of the founder members of Jayantika, an association formed in the 1950s, Guruji Mayadhar Raut played a major role in giving Odissi its classical status. He was the first Odissi Guru to introduce MUDRA VINYOGA in the study of Odissi in 1955 and SANCHARIBHAVA in the Odissi dance items and also the first to present on stage enchanting Gitagovinda ASHTAPADIS, portraying SHRINGARA RASA. His notable compositions include ‘Pashyati Dishi Dishi’. ‘Priya Charu Shile’, composed in 1961. Earlier, only the Oriya songs or the ASHTAPADI ‘Lalit Lavanga Lata’ and ‘Dashavatar’ were taught and performed.

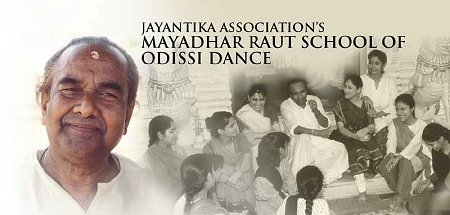
Guruji with Students at Jayantika

Guru Mayadhar Raut was honoured with Padma Shri by the President of India, Sangeet Natak Akademi Award, Sahitya Kala Parishad Award , Utkal Pratibha Puraskar, Odissi Sangeet Natak Academy Award, Rajeev Gandhi Samman, Kavi Samrat Upendra Bhanja Award and Tagore Akademi Ratna - one-time honour of Tagore Samman as a part of the ongoing commemoration of the 150th Birth Anniversary of Gurudev Rabindranath Tagore by the Sangeet Natak Akademy, National Academy of Music, Dance and Drama.

In 2010, his 80th birthday was marked by a five-day international festival of music and dance titled "Yaatra" in Delhi. On this occasion, a book titled, Odissi Yaatra - Journey of Guru Mayadhar Raut, written by Aadya Kaktikar and edited by Madhumita Raut, was also released.

A short documentary on the life and works of Guru Mayadhar Raut is available.

In August 2015, his 85th birthday was celebrated with a series of functions in Delhi and Jaipur by his disciple and daughter Madhumita Raut.

== Awards ==
Raut received the following awards:

- Padma Shri Award (2010)
- Sangeet Natak Akademi Tagore Ratna (2011)
- Sangeet Natak Akademi Award (1985)
- Sahitya Kala Parishad Award (1984)
- Utkal Pratibha Puraskar (1984)
- Odissi Sangeet Natak Academy (1977)
- Rajeev Gandhi Samman (2003)
- Kavi Samrat Upendra Bhanja Samman (2005)
- Biju Patnaik Samman (1993)

== Sources ==
- Raut, (Guru) Mayadhar; Leela Venkataraman (February 2006). "Guru Mayadhar Raut". Sruti (257).
- Odissi Yaatra : The Journey of Guru Mayadhar Raut, by Aadya Kaktikar (ed. Madhumita Raut) Publisher: B.R. Rhythms, Delhi,2010. ISBN 978-81-88827-21-3.
- Madhumita Raut
- Reviving Odissi with a focus on the classical The Hindu 28 December 2010
- Delectable depiction of Navararas by N K MUDGAL
- 4th Guru Shishya Parampara Dance Festival Delhi
- Celebrating Guru Mayadhar Raut's 80th birthday 23–25 July 2010 New Delhi
- Documentary on Guru Mayadhar Raut on YouTube
- Guru Mayadhar Raut - Ashish Mohan Khokar, Bangalore, India. The Mohan Khokar Dance Collection 30 July 2010
- Arts & Entertainment Outlook Magazine April 9, 2001
- Odissi: What, Why and How : Evolution, Revival & Technique by Madhumita Raut, Published B.R.Rhythms, Delhi, 2007. ISBN 81-88827-10-X.
