= Veernala Jayarama Rao =

Performer of Kuchipudi style, classical dance from Andhra Pradesh, India

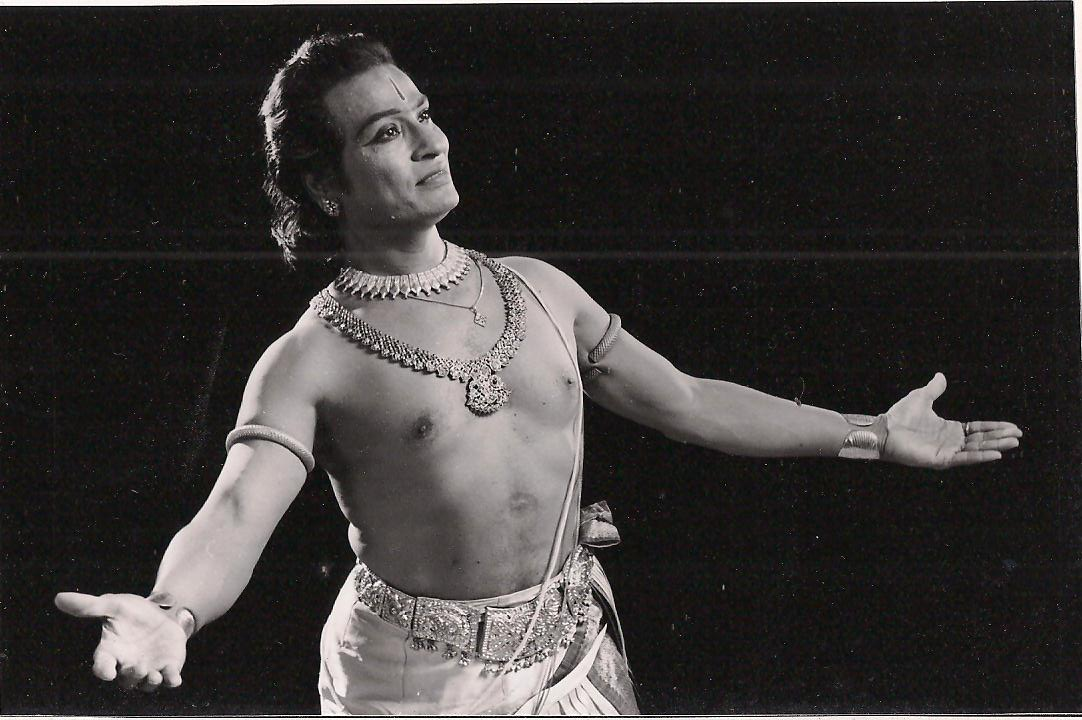
- Born: 4 November 1951 (age 74); K. Kotapadu, Andhra Pradesh
- Occupations: Kuchipudi Exponent & Guru
- Known for: Kuchipudi
- Spouse: Vanashree Rao
- Children: 1
- Awards: Padma Shri; Sangeet Natak Akademi Award; Delhi State Award; Natya Ratna

Veernala Jayarama Rao (born 4 November 1951) is an Indian Kuchipudi performer.

== Early life ==
After relocating to Delhi, India, he established a Kuchipudi school, training students including Swapna Sundari, Meenakshi Seshadri, and Vanashree Rao, who later became his wife and dance partner.

Rao serves on the Expert Committee for Kuchipudi under the Ministry of Human Resource Development (HRD Ministry) and has previously held a senior research fellowship focused on the art form.

== Awards and recognitions ==
He has received several awards, including the Padma Shri (2004), the Sangeet Natak Akademi Award (1999, shared with Vanashree Rao), the Delhi State Award, and the Andhra Pradesh Samman. He also received the Natyaratna Award from the Sanmukhananda Sabha in 2005.

== See also ==
- Kuchipudi
- Vempati Chinna Satyam
