= Sharan Rani Backliwal =

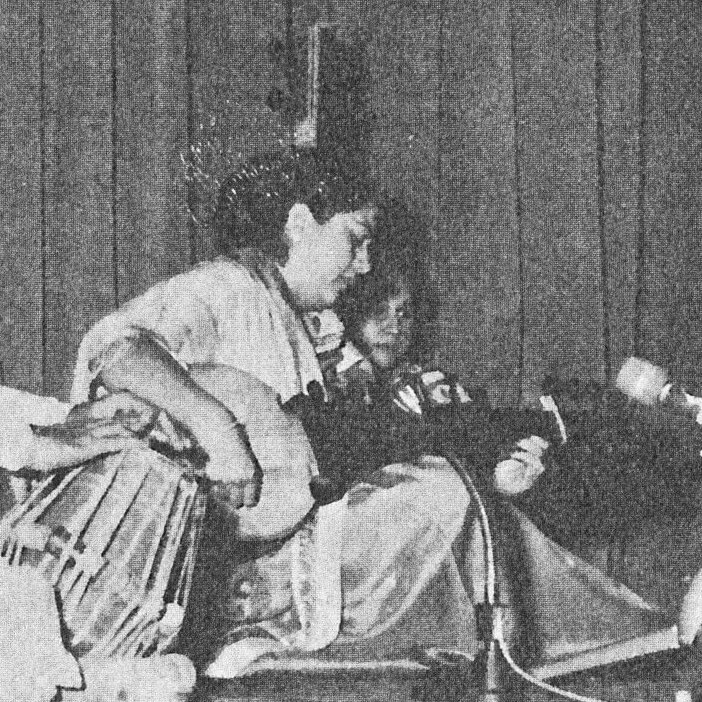
- Sharan Rani in Tehran

Background information
- Born: Sharan Rani Mathur; 9 April 1929; Delhi
- Died: 8 April 2008 (aged 78) Delhi
- Genre: Indian classical music
- Occupations: instrumentalist, music scholar
- Instrument: sarod

Sharan Rani (also known as Sharan Rani Backliwal, née Mathur) (9 April 1929 – 8 April 2008) was an Indian classical sarod player and music scholar.

Her private collection of 379 musical instruments ranging from the 15th to the 19th century is now part of the "Sharan Rani Backliwal Gallery of Musical Instruments" at the National Museum, New Delhi.

== Early life and training ==
She was born Sharan Rani Mathur in the walled city of Old Delhi to a conservative Hindu family of well-known businessmen and educationists. As a young girl, she learned to play the sarod from the master musicians Allauddin Khan and his son Ali Akbar Khan. She began her musical career in the face of immense familial opposition; during this period in Indian history, a career as a musician was seen as something for gharanas (families where music was a hereditary profession) or typical of nautch girls or baijis, not something appropriate for the daughter of a respectable, non-musician family. She also learned the Kathak form of classical Indian dance from Achhan Maharaj and Manipuri dance from Nabha Kumar Sinha. In 1953, she did her M.A from Delhi University, and studied at Indraprastha College for Women.

== Musical career ==
From the late 1930s, Sharan Rani presented her sarod recitals on the concert stage in India for over seven decades. She was one of the first to record for UNESCO and to release musical recordings with major record companies in the United States, Britain and France. According to Jawaharlal Nehru, she was the "Cultural Ambassador of India" Dr. Zakir Husain said about her, "Sharan Rani has achieved perfection in music. She will therefore get the love of the entire world". Noted Musician Yehudi Menuhin said about her : "I hasten to add my voice to the many admiring and grateful ones which would try to express the love and respect we feel for this great artiste"

Concerned that the rich Dhrupad tradition was fading away, some of her solo recitals were accompanied by both Tabla and Pakhawaj.

Rani was one of the earliest artists of All India Radio and Doordarshan. She was popularly known as 'Sarod Rani' (The Queen of Sarod). Sharan Rani was the first woman Instrumentalist of India who achieved international acclaim.

== Musical authorship and teaching ==
Backliwal also wrote a history of the sarod, titled The Divine Sarod: Its Origin, Antiquity and Development, which was released in 1992, by K. R. Narayanan, the then Vice President of India. A second edition of The Divine Sarod was released in 2008 by I. K. Gujral, former Prime Minister of India. She also wrote a number of articles on music.

Backliwal taught music through the Guru–shishya tradition and never took any fees from her students. Many students also lived in her house as her resident-disciples for several years, free of charge.

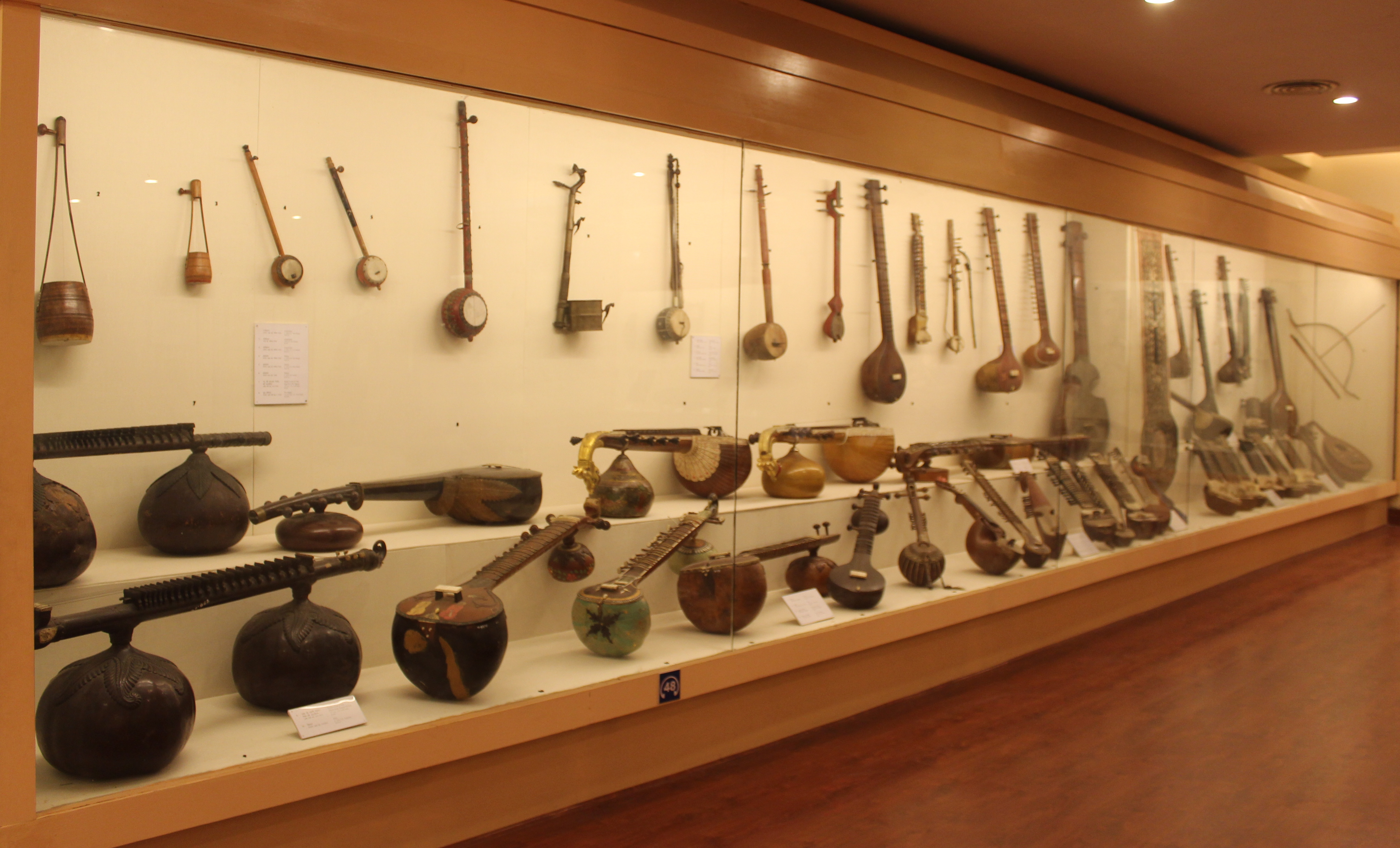
Sharan Rani Backliwal Gallery at the National Museum

Backliwal donated to the National Museum, New Delhi varieties of instruments from different States of India, from different 'Gharanas' of music, covering different time periods, allowing for a methodical comparative and developmental study. These were donated in three linked donations in 1980, 1982 and 2002. These instruments are housed in a permanent gallery, called the 'Sharan Rani Backliwal Gallery of Musical Instruments', in the National Museum, New Delhi, inaugurated and dedicated to the nation in 1980 by the then Prime Minister, Indira Gandhi, who called it a 'collection of rare musical instruments of national importance.'

== Musical Instruments Collection ==
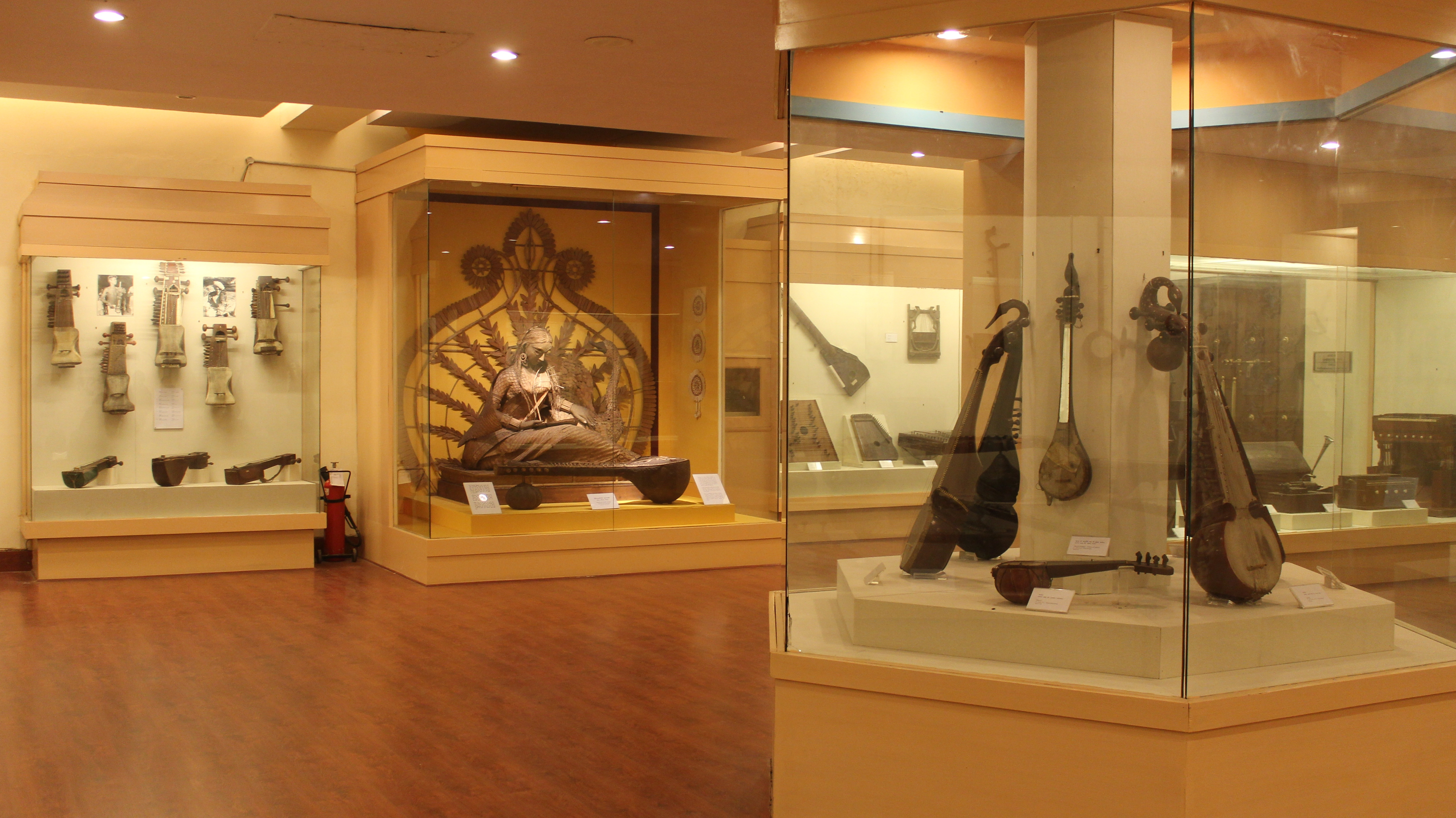
Different types of musical instruments : From the Sharan Rani Backliwal Collection

The collection includes instruments that represent various gharanas and regions spanning from the 15th to the 19th century. These are as follows:

- Mayuri Sitar (1850) acquired from a royal family in Rajasthan
- Tiger Head Rabab from Kashmir
- Durbari Sitar (1850)
- Vina (1825)

== Personal life ==
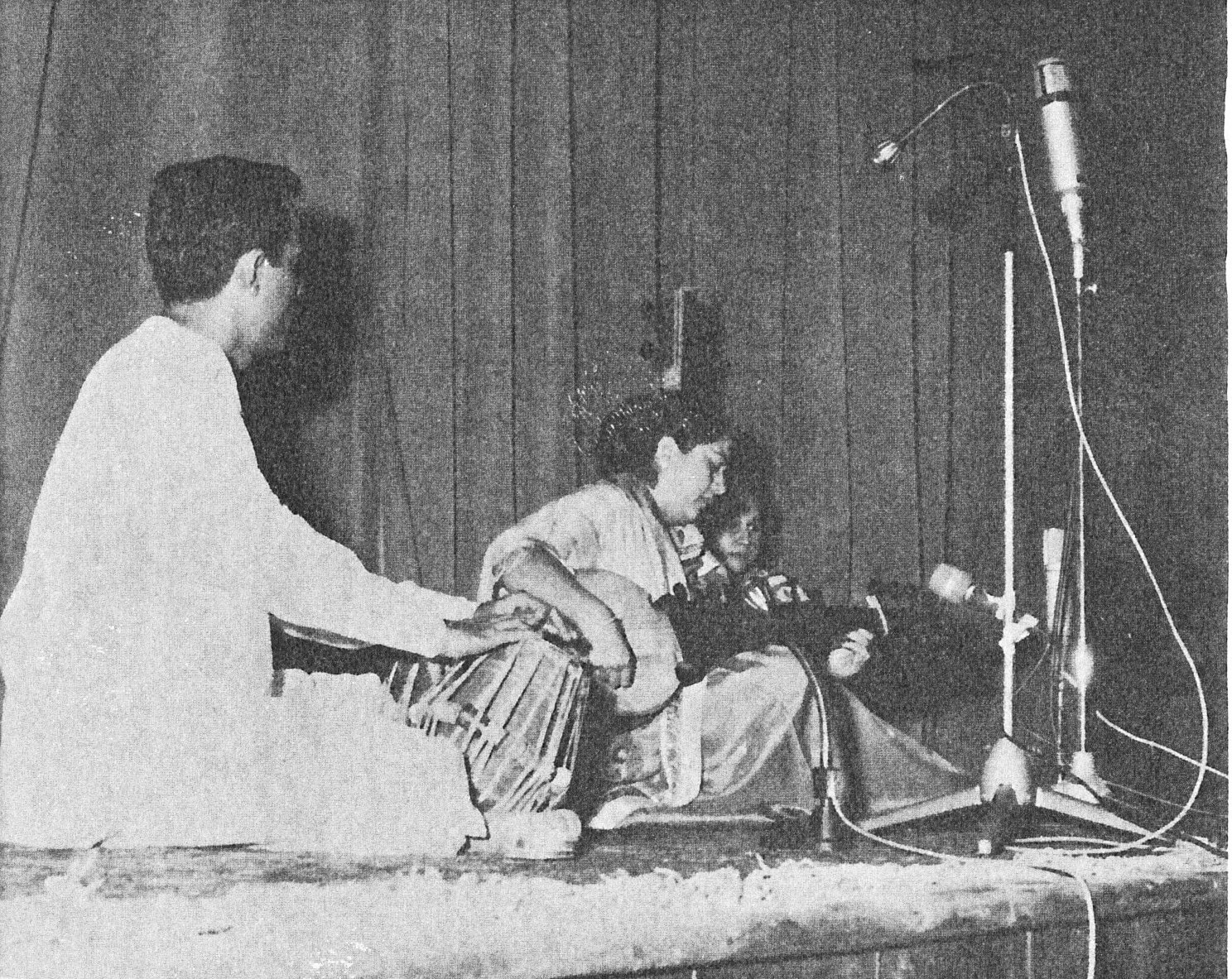
Sharan Rani playing the Sarod at a concert in Tehran

In 1960, she married Sultan Singh Backliwal who belonged to a prominent Digamber Jain business family of Delhi. In 1974, they had a daughter, Radhika Narain. After battling cancer for a few years, she died on 8 April 2008, a day before her 79th birthday.

== Awards and honours ==
In 2004, the government of India honoured select artists by conferring upon them the title of 'National Artiste'. Sharan Rani was the only woman instrumentalist to receive this title.

Other awards and honours she received include:

- Vishnu Digambar Parithoshik (1953)
- Padma Shri (1968)
- Sahitya Kala Parishad Award (1974)
- 'Acharya' and 'Tantri Vilas' (1979)
- Sangeet Natak Akademi Award (1986)
- Rajiv Gandhi award for Vocational Excellence (1993)
- Distinguished Alumni award by Delhi University (1997)
- National Excellence award (1999)
- Padma Bhushan (2000)
- Lifetime Achievement award (2000)
- Maharana Mewar Foundation award (2004)
- Kala Parishad award from Bhopal (2005)

== Discography ==
Sharan Rani : The Legendary Queen of Sarod (Music today) (2008)

The Great Sarod Virtuoso (1967)

Musique Classique Indienne (1967)
