= GLOBE Program =

Science education organization

- Formation: 1994
- Type: International organization
- Purpose: Environmental education, scientific research
- Region served: Worldwide
- Website: www.globe.gov

The Global Learning and Observations to Benefit the Environment (GLOBE) Program is a worldwide hands-on, science and education program focusing on the environment, now active in over 125 countries worldwide. It works to promote the teaching and learning of science, enhance environmental literacy and stewardship, and promote scientific discovery. Students, educators, and members of the public collect data and perform research in collaboration with scientists from many international agencies, and their work is made accessible through the GLOBE website.

== Background ==
The GLOBE Program seeks to teach students in grades K–12 scientific research skills through hands-on experiments and training on equipment. Students, educators, and scientists participate in a global learning network. The GLOBE Program also allows members of the public to record environmental observations through the GLOBE Observer app.

GLOBE is sponsored by NASA (National Aeronautics and Space Administration), NOAA (National Oceanic and Atmospheric Administration), and the National Science Foundation, through an inter-agency agreement signed in 1998. The U.S. Department of State supports the work of the GLOBE Program internationally and many other organizations support the GLOBE Program in the U.S. and around the world. The Suriname coordinator is Monique Pool.

The program is supported by Education Development Center (EDC) and City College of New York (CUNY), which together operate the GLOBE Implementation Office (GIO), along with a number of partners. In addition, NASA's Goddard Space Flight Center (GSFC) manages the GLOBE Data and Information System (DIS) that provides sustained operation and engineering of GLOBE's information technology infrastructure. The GIO was supported by the University Corporation for Atmospheric Research (UCAR) in Boulder, Colorado from 2014–2024.

== Mission ==
The GLOBE Program's mission is "to increase awareness of individuals throughout the world about the global environment, contribute to increased scientific understanding of the Earth and support improved student achievement in science and mathematics."

Specific goals include:

- Improve student achievement across the curriculum with a focus on student research in environmental and Earth system science;
- Enhance awareness and support activities of individuals throughout the world to benefit the environment;
- Contribute to scientific understanding of Earth as a system;
- Connect and inspire the next generation of global scientists; and
- Get young minds outside to explore new things.

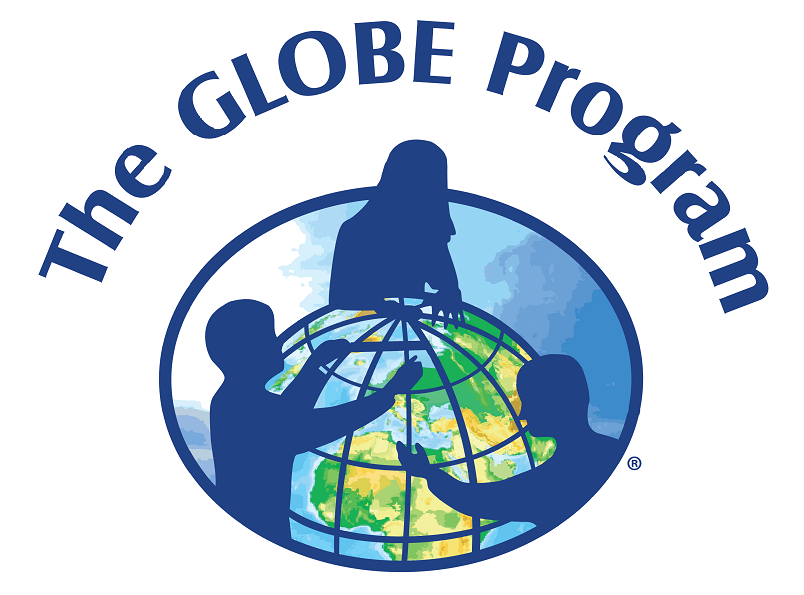
GLOBE Program official logo, describing that students and education take lead of tomorrow

== History ==
- 1994: The GLOBE Program is established
- 1995: The GLOBE Program is launched
- 1997: GLOBE Teacher Conference held in the U.S.
- 1998: 1st GLOBE Learning Expedition (GLE) held in Finland
- 2000: 2nd GLE held in the U.S.
- 2003: 53 protocols developed across atmosphere, biosphere, hydrosphere, and pedosphere
- 2003: 3rd GLE held in Croatia
- 2003: NASA selects the University Corporation for Atmospheric Research (UCAR), to operate The GLOBE Program Office
- 2005: Earth Day; GLOBE celebrates its 10th birthday with 15,000 schools in 106 countries
- 2008: 4th GLE held in South Africa
- 2009: 20 million data entries in the global database
- 2011: Student Climate Research Campaign launches
- 2014: 1st regional student aerosols research campaign led by Europe and Eurasia; Global Precipitation Measurement and Soil Moisture Active Passive student research campaigns with NASA launched
- 2014: 5th GLE held in India
- 2014: NASA selects the University Corporation for Atmospheric Research (UCAR) to operate The GLOBE Implementation Office
- 2015: Earth Day, GLOBE celebrates its 20th birthday; GLOBE launches new data entry app for schools, an enhanced website, and an updated teacher's guide; 51 protocols included in the Program; 128 million data entries in the global database
- 2016: GLOBE provides online eTraining; hosts International Virtual Science Fair and six regional U.S. science fairs, and various student scientific campaigns
- 2016: GLOBE Observer app is launched
- 2017: Data entries in global database reach over 140 million measurements; International Virtual Science Symposium increases in number of submitted projects and worldwide representation
- 2018: 6th GLE held in Ireland
- 2024: NASA selects EDC and CUNY to operate the GLOBE Implementation Office

== Activities for learning ==
The GLOBE Program provides the opportunity for students to learn by taking scientifically valid measurements in the fields of atmosphere, hydrosphere, pedosphere, biosphere, and Earth as a system. Students report their data through the Internet, create maps and graphs to analyze data sets, and collaborate with scientists and other GLOBE students around the world. All the GLOBE data and observations are in the public domain and the program is committed to open science.

GLOBE has a Mosquito Habitat Mapper application for data collection.

== Contribution by scientists ==
STEM (Science, Technology, Engineering, and Mathematics) professionals are invited to join the GLOBE International STEM Network (GISN). GISN members are involved in the design and implementation of the GLOBE Program. Scientists are involved in helping select GLOBE environmental measurements, developing measurement procedures, and ensuring overall quality control of data. This is important to ensure that other scientists have confidence about these results and their findings. Their continued support and direction helps to ensure that GLOBE environmental measurements make a significant contribution to the global environmental database.

== See also ==
- GLOBE Observer
