= Komala Varadan =

Indian classical dancer of Bharatnatyam

- Born: India
- Occupations: Classical dancer Painter; Photographer
- Known for: Bharatnatyam
- Awards: Padma Shri; Sahitya Kala Parishad Award; Bharat Shiromani Award; Kalaimamani Award; Rajyotsava Prashasthi; Natya Rani; IBC International Woman of the Year Award; Full Circle Inner Flame Award
- Website: komalavaradan.com

Komala Varadan is an Indian classical dancer of Bharatnatyam, writer and the founder of Kalaikoodam, a Delhi-based institute for promoting arts, literature and culture. She is known to be proficient in various art forms such as choreography, photography and painting.

== Career ==
Varadan learnt classical dance from one of the leading dance maestros of India, Vazhuvoor Ramiah Pillai. She has performed on many stages in India and abroad. Her paintings have been exhibited at many galleries including the Russian Centre of Science and Culture (RCSC), New Delhi and the National Gallery of Modern Art, New Delhi. She has published two novels and a text on Bharatnatyam and has served as the member of the Jury of the 30th National Film Awards for the feature films section. She is also a member of the Authors Guild of India.

Varadan is a recipient of the Kalaimamani Award of the Government of Tamil Nadu, Rajyotsava Prashasthi of the Government of Karnataka, Natya Rani title, International Woman of the Year Award (1998 -1999) of the International Biographical Centre, Cambridge, Sahitya Kala Parishad Samman and the Full Circle Inner Flame Award (1999). The Government of India awarded her the fourth highest civilian honour of the Padma Shri, in 2005, for her contributions to Indian classical dance. Three years earlier, Varadan was in the news for a civil suit filed by her against the Indian Council for Cultural Relations (ICCR), for categorising performing artists over the age of 45 as lecture-demonstration presenters. However, the court ruling was against her. Her life has been documented in an autobiography, Komala Varadan, published in 1985.

== See also ==
- Bharatnatyam
- 30th National Film Awards
