= Garhwal =

Garhwal may refer to the following topics associated with Uttarakhand, India:

== Places ==
- Garhwal Himalaya, a sub-range of the Himalayas
- Garhwal kingdom, a former kingdom
- Garhwal District (British Garhwal), a former district of British India
- Garhwal division, a modern administrative division
- Pauri Garhwal district, a district in the division
- Tehri Garhwal district, a district in the division
- Garhwal (Lok Sabha constituency), a parliamentary constituency

== Other uses ==
- Garhwal F.C., an Indian football club from New Delhi
- The Garhwal Rifles, a regiment of the Indian army
- Garhwal University, a university in Srinagar, Uttarakhand

== See also ==
- Garhwali (disambiguation)
- Gadwal, a town in Telangana, India
- Gharwali Baharwali, an Indian comedy drama film
