= Monique Pool =

Dutch-born Surinamese interpreter, nonprofit executive and environmentalist

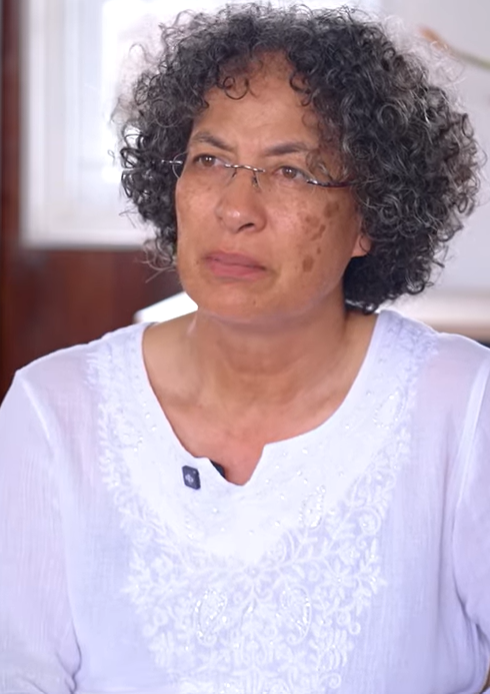
- Pool in 2025
- Born: 1964 (age 61–62); Netherlands
- Occupations: Environmentalist; Interpreter; Nonprofit executive
- Organization(s): Founder and Director of the Green Heritage Fund Suriname, Suriname Country Coordinator for the GLOBE Program,
- Awards: CNN Hero

Monique Pool (born 1964) is a Dutch-born Surinamese interpreter, nonprofit executive, and environmentalist known as the "Sloth Lady of Suriname" for her work founding and directing the Green Heritage Fund Suriname, which focuses on rescuing Xenarthra, most notably sloths. She gained international recognition upon being selected as a CNN Hero. She also serves as the Suriname County Coordinator for the GLOBE Program.

== Biography ==
Pool grew up in the Netherlands but moved to Suriname when she was young. She first wanted to be a biologist, but ultimately decided to work as a professional translator and interpreter.

Her dog got scared of fireworks and ran away one night. During her search for her dog, she met a baby sloth in need of care at a rescue center. She offered to look after the sloth, and immediately faced the problem of figuring out how to care for a three-toed sloth, something that was not easy to learn at the time. The situation also posed a difficulty in sourcing both the goat's milk required in lieu of sloth milk by the babies and the leaves eaten on a regular basis by the sloths. Despite the baby dying after two years, she decided she wanted to continue supporting sloths.

She founded the Green Heritage Fund Suriname in 2005, which focuses largely on sloths and on other Xenarthra. She utilizes her home as the sloth sanctuary, and takes care of sloths there. After nursing them back to health, she releases them to the wild. She has also led Green Heritage Fund to do other tasks and events, such as children's education.

In 2006, she also got involved in dolphin monitoring and soon began doing hydrology measurements for the dolphins. This led to her selection as the Suriname Country Coordinator for the GLOBE Program.

Her fame grew after an event in 2012, dubbed "Slothageddon" by her, where she rescued around 160 sloths and 40 other animals from a patch of forest in Paramaribo that was getting cleared, despite only being informed beforehand of about 14 sloths being there. This resulted in massive overcrowding at her home. By 2015, she'd rescued over 600 sloths and other animals.

She became a CNN Hero in 2015. She was made a Chevalier of the Legion of Honour in 2022.
