= Garhwali =

Garhwali may refer to:

- Garhwali people, an ethno-linguistic group who live in northern India
- Garhwali language, the Indo-Aryan language spoken by Garhwali people
- anything from or related to:
  - Garhwal division, a region in state of Uttarakhand, India
  - Garhwal Kingdom, a former princely state in what is now Uttarakhand, India
  - Garhwal (disambiguation), for other uses
- The soldier of the Indian Army regiment The Garhwal Rifles

== See also ==
- Garhwal (disambiguation)
