= Rajni Bakshi =

Indian journalist

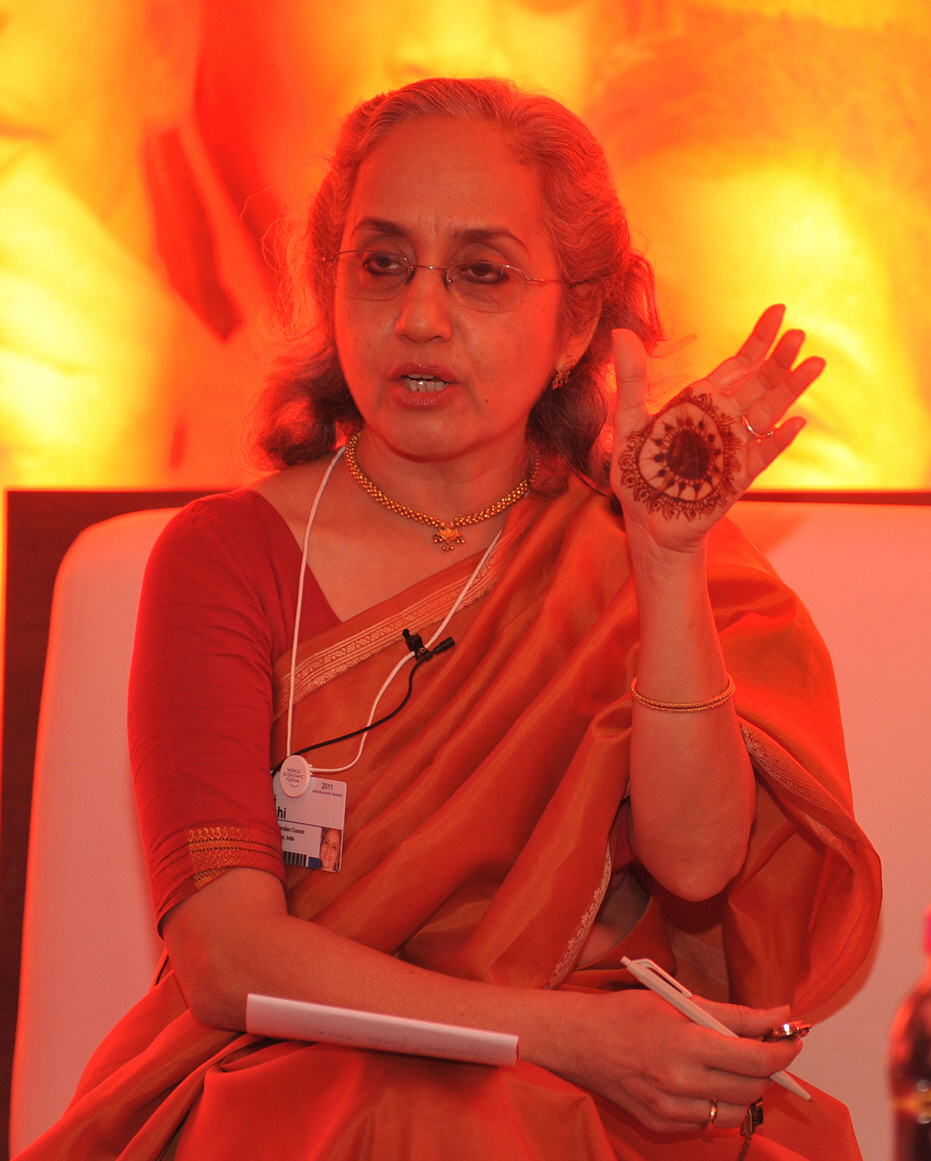
- Rajni Bakshi at the Cultural Economics in India session during the India Economic Summit 2011 in Mumbai, India
- Citizenship: Indian
- Education: Indraprastha College for Women; George Washington University; University of Rajasthan
- Occupations: Journalist; Author; Social activist
- Organization: Ahimsa Conversations

Rajni Bakshi is a Mumbai-based freelance journalist and author. She writes about social and political movements in contemporary India. Rajni is the founder and curator of Ahimsa Conversations, an online platform for exploring the possibilities of nonviolence.

She was formerly the Gandhi Peace Fellow at Gateway House: Indian Council on Global Relations. Her journalism has appeared in many English and Hindi newspapers and magazines. Bakshi attended school in Kingston, Jamaica, Indraprastha College (Delhi), George Washington University (Washington D.C.) and Rajasthan University (Jaipur).

In 2000 Rajni received the Homi Bhabha Fellowship. Her book Bazaars, Conversations and Freedom (2009) won two Vodafone Crossword Book Awards, one in the "Non Fiction" category, and one in the "Popular Award" category.

== Works ==
- The Long Haul: The Bombay Textile Workers Strike of 1982-83 (1986; Great Bombay Textile Strike)
- The Dispute Over Swami Vivekananda's Legacy (1993; Swami Vivekananda)
- Bapu Kuti: Journeys in Rediscovery of Gandhi (1998)
- LETS Make it Happen: Alternative Economics (2003)
- An Economics for Well-Being (2003)
- Bazaars, Conversations and Freedom (2009)
