= Swapna Sundari (dancer) =

Indian dancer

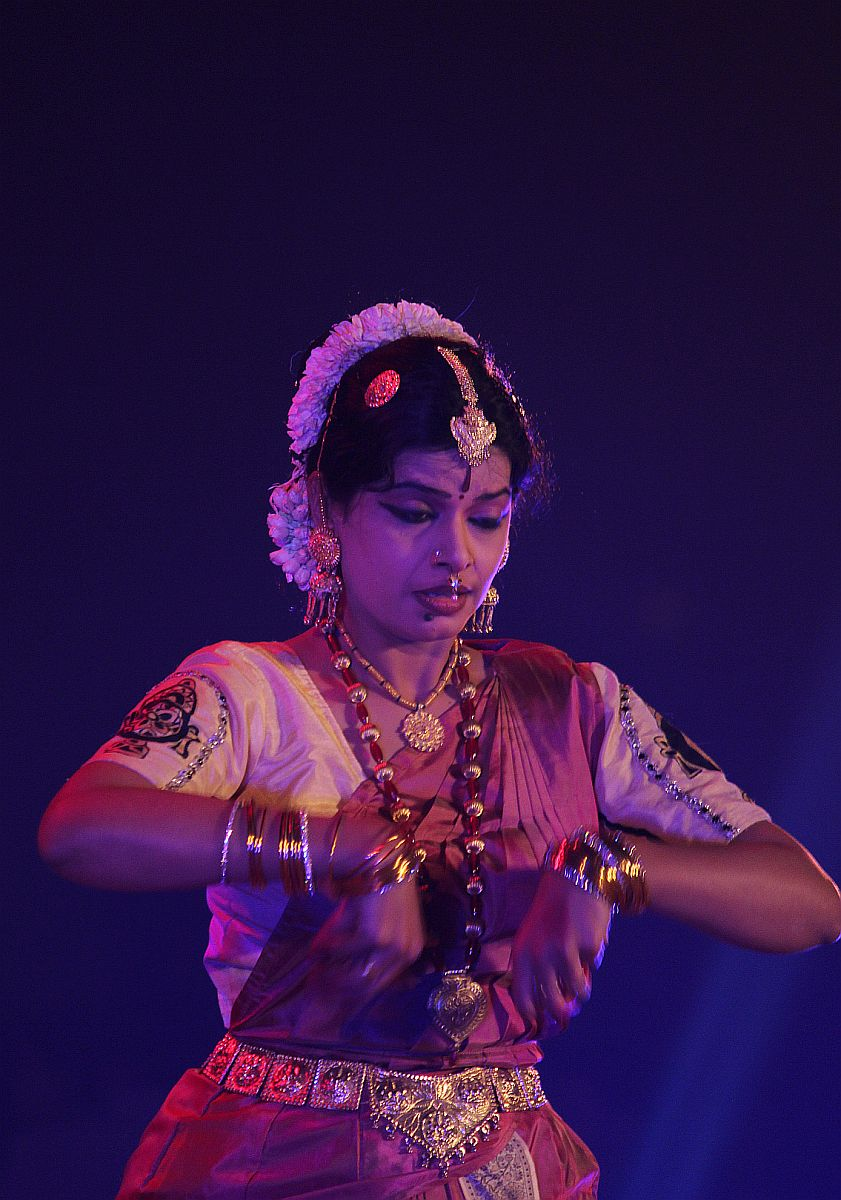
- Born: Chennai
- Occupations: dancer, choreographer, vocalist
- Known for: exponent of Kuchipudi and Bharatanatyam
- Notable work: Vilasini natyam: Bharatam of Telugu temple and court dancers
- Awards: Padma Bhushan

Swapnasundari is an Indian dancer, an exponent of Kuchipudi and Bharatanatyam, a choreographer and a vocalist.

She is a recipient of the Padma Bhushan, given Government of India in 2003, as well as the Sahitya Kala Parishad and Sangeet Natak Akademi Award. Her album Janmabhoomi Meri Pyaari was well received. She has written books like The World of Koochipoodi Dance and Tracing the roots of the classical dance. She is the founder-director of Koochipoodi Dance Centre in Delhi.

Born in Chennai she has lived in Andhra Pradesh and Delhi.

== Works ==
- Vilasini natyam: Bharatam of Telugu temple and court dancers, by Swapnasundari. Swapnasundari, 2010. ISBN 8184651473.
