= Narendra Sharma (dancer) =

Indian dancer and choreographer (1924–2008

- Born: 21 September 1924; Bulandshahar, Uttar Pradesh, British Raj
- Died: 14 January 2008 (aged 83); Delhi, India
- Education: Uday Shankar India Cultural Centre
- Occupations: Dancer and Choreographer
- Spouse: Jayanti Sharma
- Children: Bharat Sharma
- Awards: Sangeet Natak Akademi Award

Narendra Sharma (September 21, 1924 – January 14, 2008) was an Indian dancer and choreographer. He was trained in Uday Shankar's school of modern dance. He is regarded as a pioneer in modern Indian dance. For his contributions to the field, he received the Sangeet Natak Akademi Award for Contemporary Choreography in 1976.

== Early life ==
Narendra Sharma was born on 21 September 1924 in Bulandshahar, Uttar Pradesh. He ran away from home at a young age to enrol in Uday Shankar India Cultural Centre at Almora, where he was mentored by Uday Shankar and Zohra Sehgal. He was initially denied admission due to his young age. In a 2002 interview, Sharma recalled: "They asked me to get the consent of my guardian, but I had closed all doors behind me. When that night I was sitting on a footpath, Dada (Pt Uday Shankar) called me over. He registered my zeal and accepted me as a student. I was the youngest in Dada’s first batch of students who were taught contemporary Indian ballet at Almora."

== Career ==
Sharma's first job was given by impresario Haren Ghosh in Kolkata to be part of a dance troupe that traveled to entertain Indian Troops stationed in Iran and Iraq, fighting for British Army during World War II. Thereafter he shifted to Bombay, where he came under the influence of the Indian People's Theatre Association. His early experiments in choreography were in collaboration with Sachin Shankar, a nephew of Uday Shankar's. In Mumbai he also choreographed song and dance sequences for commercial films.

In 1954, he moved to Delhi and started his long association with Modern School, New Delhi, as full-time dance teacher. Sharma's move to Delhi was the result of an invitation from the school at the express desire of principal M. N. Kapur. Working with children and adolescents, he choreographed over 300 productions.

During the early years in Delhi in 1957, Sharma was the first choreographer of Shriram Bharatiya Kala Kendra's (SBKK) Ramlila. From 1961 to 66, he rejoined SBKK to re-furbish the Ramlila in a large scale spectacle. In the late 1960s, he taught dance for two summers at the University of Washington. In 1972, he set up an independent dance group, Bhoomika.

In the 1980s he choreographed several major public performances, e.g. at the opening and closing ceremonies of the 1982 Asian Games., closing ceremony of Festival of India in erstwhile USSR in Moscow.

After his retirement from Modern School in 1986, Sharma continued to train students and choreograph productions, and remained active as a dancer even in his late seventies. He died on 14 January 2008.

His major productions for Bhoomika were: Kamayani (1970); Panchtantra ka Sher (1973); Tick-Tick (1973); Reflections (1976); Wolf-Boy (1977); Conference '79 (1979); Antim Adhyaya (1985); Prarthana (1987); Antar Chhaya (1993); Kalp Vriksha (1995); Mukhanatar (1997); Kal ki Pratiksha (2002); Gandhi (2007);

== Awards and honours ==
- Sangeet Natak Akademi Award, 1976
- Sahitya Kala Parishad Award
- Soviet Land Nehru Award
- UP Sangeet Natak Akademi
