= Asha Pande =

Indian academic (died 2018)

Dr. Asha Pande
- Born: India
- Died: 2018
- Known for: 1st Indian woman to receive Légion d'honneur

Academic background
- Education: Jawaharlal Nehru University, New Delhi; Sorbonne University, Paris

Academic work
- Discipline: French Literature and civilisation
- Institutions: Indo-French Cultural Society, Jaipur
- Website: www.cefl-ifcs.org

Dr. Asha Pande was a professor and the first Indian woman to receive the Légion d'honneur She was the founder-director of Rajasthan University's Master in European Studies programme and headed the Department of Dramatics at Rajasthan University, and Center for French and Francophone Studies. She has been honored for promoting French language in India. She died on 4 October 2018 due to liver ailment.

== Work ==
After working at Banaras Hindu University for a few months in 1977 prior to her marriage, she served as a teacher in Jaipur's Maheshwari Public School before founding the Indo-French Cultural Society for promoting academic and cultural relations between France, the Francophone countries and India in 1982. In 1987, she got an offer from Rajasthan University as 'Assistant Professor'. Seventeen years later, despite being the only permanent faculty in French, in 2004, she started the Masters and PhD courses in French. Her tireless efforts resulted in mentoring and training teachers for more than 50 institutions teaching French at school level and 10 at the college level in the state of Rajasthan. Her recent efforts are for university level cooperation which can benefit universities student and faculty exchange programmes. She was the founder Director of International Cooperation Cell, University of RAJASTHAN. She was Professor and was Head twice of the Department of ELLCS, earlier known as Department of Modern European Languages. She served University from 1987 to 2014. She was also founder co-ordinator of Centre for European Studies, a Centre created under UGC Area Studies programme from September 2012 till June 2014. She superannuated from University of Rajasthan in 2014. She continues to be Adjunct faculty teaching French Literature to Master Level students. Total five Doctorate degrees have already been awarded in French Literature and two in Dramatics under her guidance by University of Rajasthan. She continues to give her voluntary services to Indo French Cultural Society (IFCS) as Hon Director of Centre for English and Foreign Languages (CEFL) since its inception.

== Honors ==
- Légion d'honneur (2010) - First Indian Woman to receive Highest French Civilian Award by President Sarkozy.
- She was awarded by the President of India Shri Ram Nath Kovind as the First Lady for breaking gender barriers and achieving new heights of excellence in the field of education. She was among 211 ladies selected from India for excelling in their respective domains. "Rajasthan Patrika Jaipur, 4.02.2018, p. 25: Rajasthan Patrika, Jaipur, 21.01.2018, p. 20: City Bhaskar, Jaipur 21.01.18, p. 28, Times of India, Jaipur, 31.01.18, Jaipur Times p. 3. Dainik Bhaskar, Jaipur, 17.01.18, p. 24.
- Medal and Citation by the Vice President, Regional Council of Besaçon, France, in 1995 for her exemplary efforts in the field of Indo French Cooperation.
- Silver Jubilee National Award by Association of Indian Teachers of French in 2010, in appreciation of the services rendered to the development of French & Francophone Studies in India.
- Shiksha Vibhushan Samman by Rajasthan Yuva Chatra Sangh, in 2010, for her services rendered to development of European languages.
- Bade Dilwale Award by 93.5 Red FM in March 2013 for exemplary voluntary services in the field of Education. She was placed in Star category for getting maximum number of message responses to her interview telecast on Red FM.
- Women Achievement Award was conferred on her by Rajasthan Patrika on 24 April 2015.<Rajasthan Partika Jaipur 25 04 2015>

== Notes ==
September 28, 2009, French Ambassador, Jérome Bonnafont, sent a letter mentioning that the French president, Nicolas Sarkozy, had signed the decree nominating her for the honour. She is one of few Indians who have received this honour, other Indians being Satyajit Ray, Ravi Shankar, R.K. Pachauri, Amitabh Bachchan and Amartya Sen. The award was conferred on her by the Ambassador of France on 22 January 2010 at Bonjour India Festival during Jaipur Literary Festival at Jaipur.
