= List of news channels in India =

This is a list of television news channels from India.

== Hindi news channels ==
- Aaj Tak
- ABP News
- Bharat24
- Bharat Express
- CNBC Awaaz
- DD News
- ET Now Swadesh
- Good News Today
- India News
- India TV
- NDTV India
- News18 India
- News 24
- News Nation
- Republic Bharat
- Sadhna News
- Sahara Samay
- Sansad TV
- Sudarshan News
- Surya Samachar
- Times Now Navbharat
- TV9 Bharatvarsh
- Zee Business
- Zee Bharat
- Zee News

=== Defunct channels ===
- Aajtak Tez
- Zee Hindustan
- Live India
- OK India
- News World India

== Regional Hindi news channels ==
- ABP Ganga
- ABP Bihar
- India News Bihar Jharkhand
- India News Haryana
- India News Madhya Pradesh Chhattisgarh
- India News Rajasthan
- India News Uttar Pradesh Uttarakhand
- Jan TV
- NDTV Madhya Pradesh Chhattisgarh
- NDTV Rajasthan
- News18 Bihar-Jharkhand
- News18 Madhya Pradesh Chhattisgarh
- News18 Rajasthan
- News18 Uttar Pradesh Uttarakhand
- Zee Bihar Jharkhand
- Zee Delhi NCR Haryana
- Zee Madhya Pradesh Chhattisgarh
- Zee Rajasthan
- Zee Uttar Pradesh Uttarakhand
- Sahara Samay Uttar Pradesh Uttarakhand
- Sahara Samay Madhya Pradesh Chhattisgarh
- Sahara Samay Bihar Jharkhand
- Sahara Samay Rajasthan
- 9 Bharat Samachar

=== Defunct channels ===
- Dilli Aaj Tak
- Sahara Samay Delhi NCR
- Sahara Samay Mumbai
- National Voice
- R9 TV

== English news channels ==
- CNBC TV18
- CNN International
- CNN-News18
- DD India
- ET Now
- India Today
- NDTV
- NDTV World
- NDTV Profit
- NewsX
- NewsX World
- Republic TV
- Times Now
- Times Now World
- WION

=== Defunct channels ===
- India Ahead
- Bloomberg
- Mirror Now

== Assamese news channels ==
- Assam Talks
- DY 365
- News18 Assam North East
- News Live
- Prag News
- Pratidin Time

=== Defunct channels ===
- Focus NE

== Bengali news channels ==
- ABP Ananda
- Calcutta News
- High News
- Kolkata TV
- News18 Bangla
- News Time Bangla
- Republic Bangla
- TV9 Bangla
- Zee 24 Ghanta

=== Defunct channels ===
- Focus Bangla
- Mahuaa Khobor
- Tara Newz

== Bhojpuri news channels ==
- ABP Bihar
- India News Bihar Jharkhand
- Sahara Samay Bihar Jharkhand
- News18 Bihar-Jharkhand
- Zee Bihar Jharkhand

== Gujarati news channels ==
- ABP Asmita
- CNBC Bajar
- Gujarat Samachar
- News18 Gujarati
- Sandesh News
- TV9 Gujarati
- Zee 24 Kalak

== Kannada news channels ==
- Janasri News
- Kasthuri Newz 24
- News18 Kannada
- Raj News Kannada
- Republic Kannada
- Suvarna News
- TV9 Kannada
- Zee Kannada News

=== Defunct channels ===
- Udaya News
- Samaya News
- Janasri News
- NewsX Kannada

== Konkani news channel ==
- In Goa News

== Malayalam news channels ==
- Asianet News
- Jaihind TV
- Janam TV
- Kaumudy TV
- Manorama News
- Mathrubhumi News
- Media One TV
- News 18 Kerala
- Reporter TV
- Kairali News
- News Malayalam 24×7
- Big TV 24x7 Malayalam

=== Defunct channels ===
- Indiavision
- TV New
- Mangalam TV

== Marathi news channels ==
- ABP Majha
- Jai Maharashtra
- NDTV Marathi
- News18 Marathi
- Saam TV
- TV9 Marathi
- Zee 24 Taas

== Odia news channels ==
- Argus News
- Bada Khabar
- Ekamra Bharat Odia
- Kalinga TV
- Kamyab TV
- Kanak News
- MBC TV
- Nandighosha TV
- Naxatra News
- News18 Odia
- OTV
- Prameya News7

=== Defunct channels ===
- ETV News Odia
- Focus Odisha
- Zee Odisha

== Punjabi news channels ==
- ABP Sanjha
- BBC News Punjabi
- News18 Punjab Haryana
- PTC News
- Zee Punjab Haryana Himachal

== Tamil news channels ==
- ABP Nadu
- Captain News
- Janam TV Tamil
- Kalaignar Seithigal
- Lotus News
- News18 Tamil Nadu
- News J
- Polimer News
- Puthiya Thalaimurai TV
- Raj News 24X7
- Sun News

== Telugu news channels ==
- 10TV
- 99TV
- ABN Andhra Jyothi
- ETV Andhra Pradesh
- ETV Telangana
- HMTV
- MOJO TV
- NTV
- Prime9 News
- Sakshi TV
- Studio N
- T News
- TV1
- TV5
- TV9 Telugu
- V6 News
- Zee Telugu News

=== Defunct Channels ===
- Gemini News
- Zee 24 Gantalu

== Urdu news channels ==
- Aalami Samay
- News18 Jammu Kashmir Ladakh Himachal
- News18 Urdu
- Zee J&K Ladakh

== See also ==
- Television in India
- Lists of global television channels
