= List of HD channels in India =

High Definition Channels

High-definition (HD) television channels in India include general entertainment, movie, news, sports, children's, music, lifestyle, and infotainment services in multiple languages. The channels are grouped below as available, defunct, and upcoming.

== Available channels ==
116 available channels
Channel name	Language	Genre	Video	Audio	Broadcast	Launch date	Owner	Notes
Star Plus HD	Hindi	General entertainment	Full HD	Dolby Digital Plus | 7.1	Own schedule	15 April 2011	JioStar	
Colors HD	Hindi	General entertainment	Full HD	Dolby Digital Plus | 7.1	Own schedule	24 October 2011	JioStar	
Star Bharat HD	Hindi	General entertainment	Full HD	Dolby Digital Plus | 7.1	Own schedule	26 October 2012	JioStar	Formerly Life OK HD
Zee TV HD	Hindi	General entertainment	Full HD	Dolby Digital Plus | 7.1	Own schedule	15 August 2011	Zee Entertainment Enterprises	
&tv HD	Hindi	General entertainment	Full HD	Dolby Digital Plus | 7.1	Own schedule	2 March 2015	Zee Entertainment Enterprises	
Sony Entertainment Television HD	Hindi	General entertainment	Full HD	Dolby Digital Plus | 7.1	Own schedule	28 May 2012	Sony Pictures Networks	
Sony Sab HD	Hindi	General entertainment	Full HD	Dolby Digital Plus | 5.1	Own schedule	5 September 2016	Sony Pictures Networks	
DD National HD	Hindi	General entertainment	Full HD	Stereo | 2.0	Simulcast	1 April 2017	Prasar Bharati	
Investigation Discovery HD	Multilingual	General entertainment	Full HD	Dolby Digital Plus | 7.1	Own schedule	13 January 2020	Warner Bros. Discovery India	Replaced Discovery Jeet HD and Jeet Prime HD
Sun Neo HD	Hindi	General entertainment	Full HD	Stereo | 2.0	Simulcast	15 April 2024	Sun TV Network	
Star Gold HD	Hindi	Movies	Full HD	Dolby Digital Plus | 7.1	Own schedule	15 April 2011	JioStar	
Star Gold 2 HD	Hindi	Movies	Full HD	Stereo | 2.0	Own schedule	1 February 2020	JioStar	Formerly UTV HD
Star Gold Select HD	Hindi	Movies	Full HD	Stereo | 2.0	Own schedule	6 March 2017	JioStar	
Colors Cineplex HD	Hindi	Movies	Full HD	Dolby Digital | 5.1	Own schedule	19 February 2017	JioStar	Formerly Cineplex HD
Zee Cinema HD	Hindi	Movies	Full HD	Dolby Digital | 5.1	Own schedule	15 August 2011	Zee Entertainment Enterprises	
&pictures HD	Hindi	Movies	Full HD	Dolby Digital | 5.1	Own schedule	18 August 2014	Zee Entertainment Enterprises	
&xplor HD	Hindi	Movies	Full HD	Dolby Digital | 5.1	Own schedule	18 July 2019	Zee Entertainment Enterprises	
Sony Max HD	Hindi	Movies	Full HD	Dolby Digital Plus | 7.1	Simulcast	25 December 2015	Sony Pictures Networks	
Colors Infinity HD	English	General entertainment	Full HD	Dolby Digital Plus | 7.1	Own schedule	31 July 2015	JioStar	
Disney International HD	English	General entertainment	Full HD	Stereo | 2.0	Own schedule	29 October 2017	JioStar	
Star Movies HD	English	Movies	Full HD	Dolby Digital Plus | 7.1	Own schedule	15 April 2011	JioStar	
Star Movies Select HD	English	Movies	Full HD	Dolby Digital Plus | 7.1	Own schedule	9 July 2015	JioStar	
Movies Now HD	English	Movies	Full HD	Dolby Digital Plus | 7.1	Own schedule	19 December 2010	The Times Group	
MNX HD	English	Movies	Full HD	Dolby Digital Plus | 7.1	Own schedule	18 September 2016	The Times Group	Formerly Movies Now 2 HD
MN+ HD	English	Movies	Full HD	Dolby Digital Plus | 7.1	Own schedule	29 June 2015	The Times Group	
Sony Pix HD	English	Movies	Full HD	Dolby Digital Plus | 7.1	Own schedule	19 June 2014	Sony Pictures Networks	
Nick HD+	Hindi	Kids	Full HD	Stereo | 2.0	Simulcast	5 December 2015	JioStar	
Disney Channel HD	Multilingual	Kids	Full HD	Stereo | 2.0	Own schedule	15 March 2023	JioStar	
Cartoon Network HD+	Multilingual	Kids	Full HD	Stereo | 2.0	Own schedule	15 April 2018	Warner Bros. Discovery India	Formerly Toonami
ETV Bal Bharat HD	Multilingual	Kids	Full HD	Stereo | 2.0	Simulcast	27 April 2021	ETV network	
Aaj Tak HD	Hindi	News	Full HD	Stereo | 2.0	Own schedule	14 December 2018	TV Today Network	
DD News HD	Hindi	News	Full HD	Stereo | 2.0	Simulcast	1 January 2019	Prasar Bharati	
Times Now Navbharat HD	Hindi	News	Full HD	Stereo | 2.0	Simulcast	1 August 2021	The Times Group	
Sansad TV 1 HD	Multilingual	News	Full HD	Stereo | 2.0	Simulcast	15 September 2021	Prasar Bharati	
Sansad TV 2 HD	Multilingual	News	Full HD	Stereo | 2.0	Simulcast	22 May 2024	Prasar Bharati	
India TV Speed News HD	Hindi	News	Full HD	Stereo | 2.0	Own schedule	4 September 2024	Independent News Services Ltd	
Zee News HD	Hindi	News	Full HD	Stereo | 2.0	Simulcast	28 March 2025	Zee Media Corporation	
CNBC TV18 Prime	English	News	Full HD	Stereo | 2.0	Own schedule	26 October 2011	Network18	
Times Now World HD	English	News	Full HD	Stereo | 2.0	Simulcast	15 April 2017	The Times Group	Formerly Times Now HD
DD India HD	English	News	Full HD	Stereo | 2.0	Simulcast	3 October 2020	Prasar Bharati	
National Geographic HD	Multilingual	Infotainment	Full HD	Dolby Digital Plus | 7.1	Own schedule	20 February 2010	JioStar	
Nat Geo Wild HD	Multilingual	Infotainment	Full HD	Dolby Digital Plus | 7.1	Own schedule	30 June 2010	JioStar	
Discovery HD	Multilingual	Infotainment	Full HD	Dolby Digital Plus | 7.1	Own schedule	4 March 2010	Warner Bros. Discovery India	Formerly Discovery HD World
Animal Planet HD	Multilingual	Infotainment	Full HD	Dolby Digital Plus | 7.1	Own schedule	2 June 2014	Warner Bros. Discovery India	Formerly Animal Planet HD World
History TV18 HD	Multilingual	Infotainment	Full HD	Dolby Digital Plus | 7.1	Simulcast	9 October 2011	Network18	
Sony BBC Earth HD	Multilingual	Infotainment	Full HD	Dolby Digital | 5.1	Own schedule	6 March 2017	Sony Pictures Networks and BBC Studios	
Travelxp HD	Multilingual	Lifestyle	Full HD	Stereo | 2.0	Simulcast	1 February 2011	Celebrities Management Pvt Ltd	
TLC HD	Multilingual	Lifestyle	Full HD	Dolby Digital Plus | 7.1	Own schedule	2 June 2014	Warner Bros. Discovery India	Formerly TLC HD World
Zee Zest HD	Hindi	Lifestyle	Full HD	Stereo | 2.0	Own schedule	24 September 2017	Zee Entertainment Enterprises	Replaced Living Foodz HD
Star Sports 1 HD	English	Sport	Full HD	Dolby Digital Plus | 7.1	Own schedule	6 November 2013	JioStar	Formerly Star Cricket HD
Star Sports 2 HD	English	Sport	Full HD	Dolby Digital Plus | 7.1	Own schedule	6 November 2013	JioStar	Formerly ESPN HD
Star Sports 1 Hindi HD	Hindi	Sport	Full HD	Dolby Digital Plus | 7.1	Own schedule	1 February 20	JioStar	Formerly Star Sports HD 3
Star Sports 2 Hindi HD	Hindi	Sport	Full HD	Dolby Digital Plus | 7.1	Own schedule	15 March 2025	JioStar	Replaced Sports18 1 HD
Star Sports 1 Tamil HD	Tamil	Sport	Full HD	Dolby Digital Plus | 7.1	Own schedule	15 March 2023	JioStar	
Star Sports 2 Tamil HD	Tamil	Sport	Full HD	Dolby Digital Plus | 7.1	Own schedule	15 March 2025	JioStar	Replaced Star Life HD
Star Sports 1 Telugu HD	Telugu	Sport	Full HD	Dolby Digital Plus | 7.1	Own schedule	15 March 2023	JioStar	
Star Sports 2 Telugu HD	Telugu	Sport	Full HD	Dolby Digital Plus | 7.1	Own schedule	15 March 2025	JioStar	Replaced Star Life
Star Sports Select 1 HD	English	Sport	Full HD	Dolby Digital Plus | 5.1	Own schedule	10 August 2016	JioStar	
Star Sports Select 2 HD	English	Sport	Full HD	Dolby Digital | 5.1	Own schedule	10 August 2016	JioStar	
Sony Sports Ten 1 HD	English	Sport	Full HD	Dolby Digital | 5.1	Own schedule	15 August 2011	Sony Pictures Networks	Formerly Sony Ten 1 HD
Sony Sports Ten 2 HD	English	Sport	Full HD	Dolby Digital | 5.1	Own schedule	18 July 2017	Sony Pictures Networks	Formerly Sony Ten 2 HD
Sony Sports Ten 3 Hindi HD	Hindi	Sport	Full HD	Dolby Digital | 5.1	Own schedule	18 July 2017	Sony Pictures Networks	Formerly Sony Sports Ten 3 HD
Sony Sports Ten 5 HD	English	Sport	Full HD	Dolby Digital Plus | 5.1	Own schedule	7 April 2012	Sony Pictures Networks	Formerly Sony Six HD
Eurosport HD	English	Sport	Full HD	Dolby Digital | 5.1	Own schedule	18 March 2020	Warner Bros. Discovery India	Formerly DSport HD
Unite8 Sports 1 HD	Hindi	Sport	Full HD	Stereo | 2.0	Own schedule	2 June 2026	Zee Entertainment Enterprises	Formerly Zee Café HD
Unite8 Sports 2 HD	English	Sport	Full HD	Stereo | 2.0	Own schedule	2 June 2026	Zee Entertainment Enterprises	Formerly & Flix HD
DD Sports HD	Multilingual	Sport	Full HD	Stereo | 2.0	Simulcast	24 July 2021	Prasar Bharati	
MTV HD	Hindi	Music	Full HD	Dolby Digital | 5.1	Own schedule	25 May 2017	JioStar	Formerly MTV HD+
Star Vijay HD	Tamil	General entertainment	Full HD	Dolby Digital Plus | 7.1	Own schedule	29 May 2016	JioStar	
Colors Tamil HD	Tamil	General entertainment	Full HD	Dolby Digital | 5.1	Own schedule	19 February 2018	JioStar	
Sun TV HD	Tamil	General entertainment	Full HD	Dolby Digital Plus | 7.1	Own schedule	11 December 2011	Sun TV Network	
Jaya TV HD	Tamil	General entertainment	Full HD	Stereo | 2.0	Own schedule	18 June 2016	Jaya TV Network	
Zee Tamil HD	Tamil	General entertainment	Full HD	Stereo | 2.0	Own schedule	15 October 2017	Zee Entertainment Enterprises	
DD Tamil HD	Tamil	General entertainment	Full HD	Stereo | 2.0	Own schedule	19 January 2024	Prasar Bharati	
Sun Music HD	Tamil	Music	Full HD	Dolby Digital Plus | 5.1	Own schedule	11 December 2011	Sun TV Network	
Vijay Super HD	Tamil	Movies	Full HD	Dolby Digital Plus | 5.1	Own Schedule	15 March 2023	JioStar	
KTV HD	Tamil	Movies	Full HD	Dolby Digital Plus | 5.1	Own schedule	11 December 2011	Sun TV Network	
Zee Thirai HD	Tamil	Movies	Full HD	Dolby Digital Plus | 5.1	Own schedule	5 September 2021	Zee Entertainment Enterprises	
Star Maa HD	Telugu	General entertainment	Full HD	Dolby Digital | 7.1	Simulcast	12 August 2016	JioStar	
Sun Gemini HD	Telugu	General entertainment	Full HD	Dolby Digital Plus | 5.1	Simulcast	11 December 2011	Sun TV Network	Formerly Gemini TV HD
ETV HD	Telugu	General entertainment	Full HD	Stereo | 2.0	Simulcast	30 July 2016	ETV Network	
ETV Plus HD	Telugu	General entertainment	Full HD	Stereo | 2.0	Simulcast	27 December 2018	ETV Network	
Zee Telugu HD	Telugu	General entertainment	Full HD	Stereo | 2.0	Simulcast	1 January 2018	Zee Entertainment Enterprises	
DD Yadagiri HD	Telugu	General entertainment	Full HD	Stereo | 2.0	Simulcast	19 June 2026	Prasar Bharati	
Maa Movies HD	Telugu	Movies	Full HD	Dolby Digital | 7.1	Own schedule	25 June 2017	JioStar	
Sun Gemini Movies HD	Telugu	Movies	Full HD	Stereo | 2.0	Simulcast	16 March 2017	Sun TV Network	Formerly Gemini Movies HD
Zee Cinemalu HD	Telugu	Movies	Full HD	stereo | 2.0	Own schedule	1 January 2018	Zee Entertainment Enterprises	
ETV Cinema HD	Telugu	Movies	Full HD	Stereo | 2.0	Simulcast	27 December 2018	ETV Network	
Sun Gemini Music HD	Telugu	Music	Full HD	Dolby Digital | 5.1	Simulcast	16 March 2017	Sun TV Network	Formerly Gemini Music HD
Star Pravah HD	Marathi	General entertainment	Full HD	Dolby Digital | 7.1	Own schedule	1 May 2016	JioStar	
Colors Marathi HD	Marathi	General entertainment	Full HD	Dolby Digital | 5.1	Own schedule	20 July 2015	JioStar	
Zee Marathi HD	Marathi	General entertainment	Full HD	Stereo | 2.0	Own schedule	20 November 2016	Zee Entertainment Enterprises	
Sun Marathi HD	Marathi	General entertainment	Full HD	Stereo | 2.0	Own schedule	28 November 2023	Sun TV Network	
DD Sahyadri HD	Marathi	General entertainment	Full HD	Stereo | 2.0	Own schedule	11 July 2025	Prasar Bharati	
Pravah Picture HD	Marathi	Movies	Full HD	Dolby Digital | 5.1	Own schedule	15 May 2022	JioStar	
Zee Talkies HD	Marathi	Movies	Full HD	Dolby Digital | 5.1	Own schedule	15 October 2016	Zee Entertainment Enterprises	
Asianet HD	Malayalam	General entertainment	Full HD	Dolby Digital Plus | 7.1	Own schedule	13 August 2015	JioStar	
Mazhavil Manorama HD	Malayalam	General entertainment	Upscaled	Stereo | 2.0	Simulcast	14 August 2015	Malayala Manorama Group	
Sun Surya HD	Malayalam	General entertainment	Full HD	Dolby Digital | 5.1	Simulcast	16 March 2017	Sun TV Network	Formerly Surya TV HD
Zee Keralam HD	Malayalam	General entertainment	Full HD	Stereo | 5.1	Own schedule	26 November 2018	Zee Entertainment Enterprises	
Asianet Movies HD	Malayalam	Movies	Full HD	Dolby Digital | 5.1	Own schedule	15 March 2023	JioStar	
Star Jalsha HD	Bangla	General entertainment	Full HD	Dolby Digital Plus | 7.1	Simulcast	14 April 2016	JioStar	
Colors Bangla HD	Bangla	General entertainment	Full HD	Dolby Digital | 5.1	Simulcast	1 May 2016	JioStar	
Zee Bangla HD	Bangla	General entertainment	Full HD	Stereo | 2.0	Simulcast	20 November 2016	Zee Entertainment Enterprises	
Sun Bangla HD	Bangla	General entertainment	Full HD	Stereo | 2.0	Simulcast	28 November 2023	Sun TV Network	
DD Bangla HD	Bangla	General entertainment	Full HD	Stereo | 2.0	Simulcast	19 June 2026	Prasar Bharati	
Jalsha Movies HD	Bangla	Movies	Full HD	Dolby Digital Plus | 7.1	Own Schedule	14 April 2016	JioStar	
Star Suvarna HD	Kannada	General entertainment	Full HD	Stereo | 2.0	Simulcast	15 July 2017	JioStar	
Colors Kannada HD	Kannada	General entertainment	Full HD	Dolby Digital | 5.1	Simulcast	1 May 2016	JioStar	
Sun Udaya HD	Kannada	General entertainment	Full HD	Dolby Digital | 5.1	Simulcast	16 March 2017	Sun TV Network	Formerly Udaya TV HD
Zee Kannada HD	Kannada	General entertainment	Full HD	Stereo | 2.0	Simulcast	4 November 2018	Zee Entertainment Enterprises	
Zee Power HD	Kannada	Movies	Full HD	Stereo | 2.0	Simulcast	23 August 2025	Zee Entertainment Enterprises	Replaced Zee Picchar HD
DD Chandana HD	Kannada	General entertainment	Full HD	Stereo | 2.0	Simulcast	15 June 2026	Prasar Bharati	
Tarang HD	Odia	General entertainment	Full HD	Stereo | 2.0	Simulcast	1 September 2022	Odisha Television Network	
DD Odia HD	Oriya	General entertainment	Full HD	Stereo | 2.0	Simulcast	11 July 2025	Prasar Bharati	
DD Girnar HD	Gujarati	General entertainment	Full HD	Stereo | 2.0	Simulcast	11 July 2025	Prasar Bharati	

== Defunct channels ==
45 defunct channels
Channel name	Language	Genre	Video	Audio	Broadcast	Launch date	Close date	Owner	Notes
Sony Max HD	Hindi	Sports	Full HD	Dolby Digital Plus | 7.1	Simulcast	1 September 2011	7 April 2012	Sony Pictures Networks	Replaced by Sony Six, Sony Six HD
UTV Stars HD	Hindi	Lifestyle	Upscaled	Stereo | 2.0	Simulcast	19 August 2011	21 September 2013	JioStar	Replaced by UTV HD
Star Cricket HD	English	Sports	Full HD	Dolby Digital Plus | 7.1	Own schedule	15 April 2011	6 November 2013	JioStar	Rebranded as Star Sports 1 Hindi
ESPN HD	English	Sports	Full HD	Dolby Digital Plus | 7.1	Own schedule	15 April 2011	6 November 2013	JioStar	
Nat Geo Adventure HD	English	Infotainment	Full HD	Dolby Digital Plus | 7.1	Own schedule	14 June 2011	28 February 2014	JioStar	
HBO Defined HD	English	Movies	Full HD	Dolby Digital Plus | 7.1	Simulcast	21 January 2013	31 December 2015	HBO Asia	
HBO Hits HD	English	Movies	Full HD	Dolby Digital | 7.1	Own schedule	21 January 2013	4 September 2016	HBO Asia	
PIX System+	English	Movies	Full HD	Dolby Digital Plus | 7.1	Own schedule	24 July 2015	7 October 2016	Bhartiya MySky Limited	Replaced by PIX System HD
Star Sports HD3	English	Sports	Full HD	Dolby Digital Plus | 7.1	Own schedule	10 August 2016	28 May 2017	JioStar	
Star Sports HD4	English	Sports	Full HD	Dolby Digital Plus | 7.1	Own schedule	10 August 2016	28 May 2017	JioStar	
FX HD	English	General entertainment	Full HD	Dolby Digital Plus | 7.1	Own schedule	23 September 2015	15 July 2017	JioStar	
PIX System HD	English	Movies	Full HD	Dolby Digital Plus | 7.1	Own schedule	7 October 2016	30 November 2017	Bhartiya MySky Limited	Formerly PIX System+
Epic HD	Hindi	Infotainment	Full HD	Dolby Digital Plus | 7.1	Simulcast	19 November 2014	10 March 2018	IN10 Media Network	
Zee Studio HD	English	Movies	Full HD	Stereo | 2.0	Simulcast	15 August 2011	31 May 2018	Zee Entertainment Enterprises	Rebranded as &Flix HD
NewsX HD	English	News	Full HD	Stereo | 2.0	Simulcast	30 November 2016	20 June 2018	ITV Network	
Sony Le Plex HD	English	Movies	Full HD	Dolby Digital Plus | 7.1	Own schedule	23 August 2016	31 December 2018	Sony Pictures Networks	
Sony Rox HD	Hindi	Music	Full HD	Dolby Digital Plus | 7.1	Own schedule	16 January 2017	31 December 2018	Sony Pictures Networks	
Sony Ten Golf HD	English	Sports	Full HD	Stereo | 2.0	Own schedule	7 October 2015	31 December 2018	Sony Pictures Networks	
Nat Geo People HD	English	Lifestyle	Full HD	Stereo | 2.0	Own schedule	14 June 2011	20 June 2019	JioStar	
Nat Geo Music HD	English	Music	Full HD	Stereo | 2.0	Own schedule	14 June 2011	20 June 2019	JioStar	
Jeet Prime HD	Hindi	General entertainment	Full HD	Stereo | 2.0	Simulcast	12 February 2018	13 January 2020	Warner Bros. Discovery Asia-Pacific	Formerly Discovery Jeet HD
Sony ESPN HD	English	Sports	Full HD	Dolby Digital Plus | 7.1	Own schedule	16 January 2016	30 March 2020	Sony Pictures Networks	
AXN HD	English	General entertainment	Full HD	Dolby Digital Plus | 7.1	Own schedule	6 April 2015	30 June 2020	Sony Pictures Networks	
FYI TV18 HD	Multilingual	Lifestyle	Full HD	Stereo | 2.0	Own schedule	17 October 2018	8 July 2020	JioStar	
ETV Life HD	Telugu	Lifestyle	Full HD	Stereo | 2.0	Simulcast	27 December 2018	16 October 2020	ETV Network	
ETV Abhiruchi HD	Telugu	Lifestyle	Full HD	Stereo | 2.0	Simulcast	27 December 2018	16 October 2020	ETV Network	
HBO HD	English	Movies	Full HD	Dolby Digital | 5.1	Own schedule	4 September 2016	15 December 2020	HBO Asia	
Romedy Now HD	English	Movies	Full HD	Dolby Digital Plus | 7.1	Own schedule	15 February 2016	1 August 2021	The Times Group	
Sony Six HD	English	Sports	Full HD	Dolby Digital | 5.1	Simulcast	7 April 2012	24 October 2022	Sony Pictures Networks	Rebranded as Sony Sports Ten 5 HD
Star World HD	English	General entertainment	Full HD	Dolby Digital Plus | 7.1	Simulcast	15 April 2011	14 March 2023	JioStar	
Star World Premiere HD	English	General entertainment	Full HD	Dolby Digital Plus | 7.1	Own schedule	23 September 2013	14 March 2023	JioStar	
UTV HD	Hindi	Movies	Full HD	Stereo | 2.0	Own schedule	21 October 2018	14 March 2023	JioStar	Replaced by Star Gold 2 HD
BabyTV HD	English	Kids	Full HD	Stereo | 2.0	Simulcast	1 April 2016	14 March 2023	JioStar	
FOX Life HD	Hindi; English	Lifestyle	Full HD	Dolby Digital Plus | 7.1	Own schedule	16 October 2015	13 April 2024	JioStar	Replaced by Star Life HD
Comedy Central HD	English	General entertainment	Full HD	Dolby Digital Plus | 7.1	Simulcast	1 July 2015	15 March 2025	JioStar	
Star Life HD	Hindi	Lifestyle	Full HD	Dolby Digital Plus | 7.1	Own schedule	13 April 2024	15 March 2025	JioStar	Replaced by Star Sports 2 Tamil HD
Sports18 1 HD	English	Sports	Full HD	Dolby Digital | 5.1	Own schedule	15 April 2022	15 March 2025	JioStar	Replaced by Star Sports 2 Hindi HD
MTV Beats HD	Hindi	Music	Full HD	Dolby Digital Plus | 7.1	Own schedule	3 October 2016	15 March 2025	JioStar	
VH1 HD	English	Music	Full HD	Stereo | 2.0	Simulcast	20 February 2016	15 March 2025	JioStar	
Star Kiran HD	Odia	General entertainment	Full HD	Dolby Digital Plus | 7.1	Own schedule	6 June 2022	15 March 2025	JioStar	SD version still running
Sony Sports Ten 4 HD	Tamil, Telugu	Sports	Full HD	Dolby Digital | 5.1	Own schedule	1 July 2021	10 July 2025	Sony Pictures Networks	Replaced by Sony Sports Ten 4 Telugu (4B)
Zee Picchar HD	Kannada	Movies	Full HD	Dolby Digital | 5.1	Simulcast	1 March 2020	23 August 2025	Zee entertainment Enterprises	Rebranded as Zee Power
&privé HD	English	Movies	Full HD	Dolby Digital | 5.1	Own schedule	24 September 2017	31 March 2026	Zee entertainment Enterprises	
Zee Café HD	English	General entertainment	Full HD	Dolby Digital | 5.1	Own schedule	15 March 2000	2 June 2026	Zee Entertainment Enterprises	Replaced by Unite8 Sports 1 HD
&flix HD	English	Movies	Full HD	Dolby Digital | 5.1	Own schedule	3 June 2018	2 June 2026	Zee Entertainment Enterprises	Replaced by Unite8 Sports 2 HD

== Upcoming channels ==
Channel name	Language	Genre	Expected launch date	Owner
WION HD	English	News	TBA	Zee Media
Sun Movies HD	Tamil	Movies	TBA	Sun TV Network
