= List of Bengali-language television channels in India =

Indian Bengali television channels list

This is a list of Bengali language television channels in India. The first Bengali language television channel in India is DD Bangla, which was launched in 1975.

== Government-owned ==
Channel	Launch	Video	Audio	Owner	Notes
DD Bangla	1975	SD	Stereo, 2.0	Doordarshan, Prasar Bharati	Official channel of the State Government of West Bengal
DD Tripura	1994	SD	Stereo, 2.0	Doordarshan, Prasar Bharati	Official channel of the State Government of Tripura

== General entertainment ==
Channel	Launch	Video	Audio	Owner	Notes	Active
Zee Bangla	1999	SD+HD	Stereo | 2.0	Zee Entertainment Enterprises	Formerly Alpha TV Bangla	Yes
Aakash Aath	2000	SD	Stereo | 2.0	G Entertainment	Previously known as Akash Bangla	Yes
Colors Bangla	2000	SD+HD	Stereo | 2.0	JioStar (formerly ETV Network)	Previously known as ETV Bangla	No
Star Jalsha	2008	SD+HD	Stereo | 2.0	JioStar		Yes
Ruposhi Bangla	2009	SD	Stereo | 2.0	Brand Value Communications		No
Sony Aath	2009	SD	Stereo | 2.0	Culver Max Entertainment	Previously known as Channel 8	Yes
Enterr10 Bangla	2019	SD	Stereo | 2.0	Enterr10 Television Network		No
Sun Bangla	2019	SD+HD	Stereo | 2.0	Sun TV Network		Yes
Zee Bangla Sonar	2025	SD	Stereo | 2.0	Zee Entertainment Enterprises	Replaced Zee Bangla Cinema	

=== Defunct channels ===
Channel	Launch	Defunct	Video	Audio	Owner	Notes
Channel 8	2009	2010	SD	Stereo | 2.0	76 Television Network	Rebranded as Sony Aath
Mahuaa Bangla	2010	2012	SD	Stereo | 2.0	Mahuaa Media Private Limited	
Sananda TV	2011	2012	SD	Stereo | 2.0	ABP Group	

== News ==
Channel	Launch	Video	Audio	Owner	Headquarter
ABP Ananda	2005	HD	Stereo | 2.0	ABP Group	Kolkata
Calcutta News	2016	SD	Stereo | 2.0	AKD Group	Kolkata
Kolkata TV	2006	SD	Stereo | 2.0	SST Media	Kolkata
Zee 24 Ghanta	2006	SD	Stereo | 2.0	Zee Media Corporation	Bidhannagar
Channel 10	2008	SD	Stereo | 2.0	Kunal Ghosh	Kolkata
High News	2010	SD	Stereo | 2.0	High Media Infotainment INDIA Ltd	Kolkata
News Time Bangla	2011	SD	Stereo | 2.0	Brand Value Communications	Kolkata
News18 Bangla	2014	HD	Stereo | 2.0	Network18 Group (formerly ETV Network)	Gurgaon
Republic Bangla	2021	HD	Stereo | 2.0	Republic Media Network	Mumbai
TV9 Bangla	2021	HD	Stereo | 2.0	Associated Broadcasting Company Private Limited (ABCPL)	Delhi

=== Defunct channels ===
Channel	Launch	Defunct	Video	Audio	Owner	Notes
Focus Bangla	2004	2015	SD	Stereo | 2.0	Rainbow Productions Ltd	
Zee Bangla News	2005	2006	SD	Stereo | 2.0	Zee Media Corporation	Rebranded as 24 Ghanta
Tara Newz	2005	2013	SD	Stereo | 2.0	Government of West Bengal	
24 Ghanta	2006	2018	SD	Stereo | 2.0	76 Television Network	Rebranded as Zee 24 Ghanta
Mahuaa Khobor	2010	2012	SD	Stereo | 2.0	Mahuaa Media Private Limited	
ETV News Bangla	2014	2018	SD	Stereo | 2.0	ETV Network	Rebranded as News18 Bangla
Bangla Time	2016	2021	SD	Stereo | 2.0	Soft Tele Network Pvt Ltd	
Artage News	2017	2020	SD	Stereo | 2.0	News 11 Network	

== Movies ==
Channel	Launch	Video	Audio	Owner
Star Jalsha Movies	2012	SD+HD	Stereo | 2.0	JioStar
Khushboo Bangla	2017	SD	Stereo | 2.0	Manoranjan TV Group Limited
Colors Bangla Cinema	2019	SD	Stereo | 2.0	JioStar

=== Defunct channel ===
Channel	Launch	Defunct	Video	Audio	Owner
Zee Bangla Cinema	2012	2025	SD	Stereo | 2.0	Zee Entertainment Enterprises
Aamar Cinema	2018	2023	SD	Stereo | 2.0	76 Television Network

== Music ==
Channel	Launch	Video	Audio	Owner
Sangeet Bangla	2005	SD	Stereo | 2.0	Media Worldwide Limited
Dhoom Music	2010	SD	Stereo | 2.0	Brand Value Communications Limited

=== Defunct channels ===
Channel	Launch	Defunct	Video	Audio	Owner	Notes
Music F Fatafati	2014	2021	SD	Stereo | 2.0	Royal Raj Media	
Bangla Talkies	2018	2023	SD	Stereo | 2.0	Media Worldwide Limited	Rebranded as Woman TV
ON TV	2025	2026	SD	Stereo | 2.0	GLOBAL TELECASTING PRIVATE LIMITED	

== Kids ==
Channel	Launch	Video	Audio	Owner
Rongeen TV	2019	SD	Stereo | 2.0	Biswas Media Solutions Pvt Ltd

=== Audio feed ===
- Nickelodeon
- Nickelodeon Sonic
- Sony YAY!

== Infotainment & lifestyle ==
=== Audio feed ===
- Discovery Channel
- Nat Geo Wild
- National Geographic
- Travelxp

== HD channels ==
=== General entertainment ===
Channel	Launch	Video	Audio	Owner
Star Jalsha HD	14 April 2016	Full HD	Dolby Digital Plus | 7.1	JioStar
Colors Bangla HD	1 May 2016	Full HD	Dolby Digital | 5.1	JioStar
Zee Bangla HD	20 November 2016	Full HD	Stereo | 2.0	Zee Entertainment Enterprises
Sun Bangla HD	28 November 2023	Full HD	Stereo | 2.0	Sun TV Network

=== Movies ===
Channel	Launch	Video	Audio	Owner
Star Jalsha Movies HD	14 April 2016	Full HD	Dolby Digital Plus | 7.1	JioStar

== See also ==
- List of HD channels in India
