= Colors Odia =

- Country: India
- Headquarters: Bhubaneshwar, Odisha, India

Programming
- Language: Odia
- Picture format: 576i (SDTV)

Ownership
- Owner: Viacom 18
- Sister channels: List: MTV VH1 Comedy Central Colors Rishtey Rishtey Cineplex Colors Marathi Colors Gujarati Colors Gujarati Cinema Colors Bangla Colors Bangla Cinema Colors Colors Kannada Cinema Colors Kannada News18 India News18 Bihar-Jharkhand News18 Bangla Nick Nick Jr Teen Nick Sonic-Nickelodeon MTV Indies CNN-News18 Colors Infinity Colors Cineplex Colors Cineplex Bollywood Colors Super Colors Tamil

History
- Launched: April 16, 2002
- Replaced: ETV Odia
- Closed: March 15, 2025

Links
- Website: Official website

Colors Odia formerly known as ETV Odia was an Indian cable television station. Colors Odia primarily broadcasts Odia entertainment shows. Based in Bhubaneswar, it was one of the most viewed Odia channels in Odisha. It was started and promoted by Ramoji Rao, who owned the channel until 2015, when it was sold to Viacom18.

== History ==
ETV Odia started broadcasting in 2002 under Ramoji Rao. Within its first ten years, it aired serials such as Gayatri, Tulasi, Mausi and Bhagyabidhata. By August 2013, it started carrying Rajkanya, a series comparable to Sony's crime series CID.

Following Viacom18's acquisition of 50% of ETV's regional entertainment channels, the channel was integrated into the Colors network and was renamed Colors Odia. The channel over time lost prestige in Odisha. As ETV Odia, it was still leading the GEC market, but lost its local language monopoly to Sarthak TV in 2010.

Following the merger of Viacom18 and Star, Colors Odia shut down on 15 March 2025, as part of a plan to close ten channels. On 27 February, its staff left the Bhubaneshwar office and was relocated to Kolkata. The company already owned Star Kiran, created in 2022, but was also affected by the closure of the local office and had also moved to Kolkata.

== List of serials ==
Many of these serials are typically in the mould of American soap operas blended with some Oriya culture.

- Gayatri
- Tulasi
- Bada ghara bada gumarakatha
- Appa
- Boom Saka Laka
- Pratibimba
- Rumku Jhuma Na
- Bhala Paye Boli
- Tumabina
- Tuan tuin
- Jai Hanuman
- Samarpana
- Chota Mora Gaounti
- Phone In
- Barnali
- Panchatantra
- Sur jhankar
- Ajira Bigyan
- Apanaka pasanda
- Jatra Mahal
- Cinema cinema
- Sakala Tirtha
- Ama Rosei
