= List of Odia-language television channels =

This is a list of notable television stations that broadcast in the Odia language, the official language of Odisha, India.

== Government-owned channel ==
Channel	Launch	Video	Ratio	Audio	Owner	Notes
DD Odia	1994	SD+HD	16:9	Stereo | 2.0	Doordarshan, Prasar Bharati	Official channel of the State Government of Odisha

== General entertainment ==
Channel	Launch	Video	Ratio	Audio	Owner	Notes
Tarang TV	2008	SD+HD	16:9	Stereo | 2.0	Odisha Television Network	
Zee Sarthak	2017	SD	16:9	Stereo | 2.0	Zee Entertainment Enterprises	Formerly Sarthak TV
Sidharth TV	2021	SD	4:3	Stereo | 2.0	Sidharth TV Network	
Star Kiran	2022	SD	16:9	Stereo | 2.0	JioStar	

=== Defunct channels ===
Channel	Launch	Defunct	Video	Ratio	Audio	Owner	Notes
ETV Odia	2002	2015	SD	4:3	Stereo | 2.0	ETV Network	Rebranded as Colors Odia
Sarthak TV	2010	2017	SD	4:3	Stereo | 2.0	Sarthak Entertainment Group	Rebranded as Zee Sarthak
Colors Odia	2015	2025	SD	16:9	Stereo | 2.0	JioStar	Previously known as ETV Odia
Manjari TV	2020	2022	SD	16:9	Stereo | 2.0	Sambad Group	Digitally available only
Dangal Odia	2024	2025	SD	16:9	Stereo | 2.0	Enterr10 Television Network	Digitally available only

== News & infotainment ==
Channel	Launch	Video	Ratio	Audio	FTA/Rs.	Owner	Notes
OTV	1997	SD	4:3	Stereo | 2.0	Free	Odisha Television Ltd	
Kanak News	2009	SD	4:3	Stereo | 2.0	Free	Sambad Group	
Naxatra News	2009	SD	4:3	Stereo | 2.0	Free	NK Media Ventures	
MBC TV	2011	SD	4:3	Stereo | 2.0	Free	Sagar Mishra	
Kalinga TV	2015	SD	16:9	Stereo | 2.0	Free	Kalinga Media and Entertainment Group	
News18 Odia	2015	SD	16:9	Stereo | 2.0	Rs. 0.10	Network18 Group (formerly ETV Network	Previously known as ETV News Odia
Prameya News7	2015	SD	4:3	Stereo | 2.0	Free	Summa Real Media Pvt Ltd	
Nandighosha TV	2020	SD	16:9	Stereo | 2.0	Free	Focus TV Group	
Argus News	2021	SD	16:9	Stereo | 2.0	Rs. 4	Argus Media	In October 2025, This channel will be Indian pay television channel in India
Bada Khabar	2022	SD	4:3	Stereo | 2.0	Free	Ardhendu Das	

=== Defunct channels ===
Channel	Launch	Defunct	Video	Ratio	Audio	Owner	Notes
Focus Odisha	2013	2016	SD	4:3	Stereo | 2.0	Focus TV Group	Rebranded as Nandighosha TV
Zee Odisha	2014	2022	SD	4:3	Stereo | 2.0	Zee Media Corporation	Digitally available only
ETV News Odia	2015	2017	SD	4:3	Stereo | 2.0	ETV Network	Rebranded as News18 Odia

== Movies & music ==
Channel	Launch	Video	Ratio	Audio	Owner
Tarang Music	2009	SD	16:9	Stereo | 2.0	Odisha Television Network
Alankar	2015	SD	4:3	Stereo | 2.0	Odisha Television Network
Sidharth Gold	2021	SD	4:3	Stereo | 2.0	Sidharth TV Network
Sidharth Music	TBA	SD	4:3	Stereo | 2.0	Sidharth TV Network

== Religious ==
Channel	Launch	Video	Ratio	Audio	Owner	Notes
Prarthana Life	2010	SD	16:9	Stereo | 2.0	Odisha Television Network	Formerly Prarthana TV
Sidharth Utsav	2021	SD	4:3	Stereo | 2.0	Sidharth TV Network	Formerly Sidharth Bhakti
Jay Jagannath TV	2022	SD	16:9	Stereo | 2.0	Sidharth TV Network	
Sri Jagannath Dham	2026	SD	4:3	Stereo | 2.0	Odisha Television Network	

== Kids ==
=== Audio feed ===
- Sony YAY!
- ETV Bal Bharat

== HD channels ==
=== General entertainment ===
Channel	Launch	Video	Audio	Owner
Tarang HD	1 September 2022	Full HD	Stereo | 2.0	Odisha Television Network
DD Odia HD	11 July 2025	Full HD	Stereo | 2.0	Prasar Bharati

=== Defunct channel ===
Channel	Launch	Defunct	Video	Audio	Owner
Star Kiran HD	6 June 2022	15 March 2025	Full HD	Dolby Digital Plus | 7.1	JioStar

== Cable channels ==
=== General entertainment ===
Channel	Launch	Video	Audio	Owner
BTV Berhampur TV	1998	SD	Stereo | 2.0	Gopal Patnaik
Ekamra Manoranjan TV	2009	SD	Stereo | 2.0	Ekamra Media
Nilachakra Ekamra	2009	SD	Stereo | 2.0	Ekamra Media
Superstar Josh	2009	SD	Stereo | 2.0	Josh Television
Lakshyya TV	2010	SD	Stereo | 2.0	Lakshyya Entertainment Ltd
Ekamra Nilachakra	2012	SD	Stereo | 2.0	Ekamra Media
Mu Odia TV	2014	SD	Stereo | 2.0	Micro Broadcast
Odisha Plus	2016	SD	Stereo | 2.0	Odisha Television Network
Manjari TV	9 March 2020	SD	Stereo | 2.0	Sambad Group

=== News ===
Channel	Launch	Video	Audio	Owner
STV Samachar	2011	SD	Stereo | 2.0	Kumar Bhimsen
Ekamra News	2012	SD	Stereo | 2.0	Ekamra Media
Chilika TV	2014	SD	Stereo | 2.0	Might Production
Mahak News	2014	SD	Stereo | 2.0	Nageswar Entertainment
Odisha News	2014	SD	Stereo | 2.0	F7 Broadcast Pvt Ltd
Odisha Reporter	2015	SD	Stereo | 2.0	Odisha Television Network
City Plus	2016	SD	Stereo | 2.0	Odisha Television Network
Odisha Time	2018	SD	Stereo | 2.0	KAMYAB Television Private Limited
Odisha News9	2019	SD	Stereo | 2.0	Associated Broadcasting Company Private Limited (ABCL)
NewsX Odia	2020	SD	Stereo | 2.0	ITV Network
Feedin	2021	SD	Stereo | 2.0	Odisha Television Network
Focus Plus	2022	SD	Stereo | 2.0	Focus TV Group
True News Odia	2023	SD	Stereo | 2.0	Bapi Sen

=== Movies ===
Channel	Launch	Video	Audio	Owner
Barsha Tv	2022	SD	Stereo | 2.0	Barsha Vision Cable Network
Ekamra Cinema	2012	SD	Stereo | 2.0	Ekamra Media
STV Sunakhala	2020	SD	Stereo | 2.0	STV Media Pvt Ltd

=== Music ===
Channel	Launch	Video	Audio	Owner
Ekamra Musiq	2012	SD	Stereo | 2.0	Ekamra Media
Mu Odia	2016	SD	Stereo | 2.0	Micro Broadcast
RCN ODIA	2022	HD	Stereo | 2.0	RCN MEDIA
RCN BHAKTI	2022	HD	Stereo | 2.0	RCN MEDIA
One Paschima	2021	SD	Stereo | 2.0	Ekamra Media
Rang Rangoli	2026	SD	Stereo | 2.0	Ekamra Media

=== Religious ===
Channel	Launch	Video	Audio	Owner
Ekamra Paramatma	2012	SD	Stereo | 2.0	Ekamra Media

== Digital channels ==
=== General entertainment ===
Channel	Launch	Video	Audio	Owner
Colors Odia	2012	SD	Stereo | 2.0	JioStar
Manjari TV	2020	SD	Stereo | 2.0	Sambad
Dangal Odia	2024	SD	Stereo | 2.0	Enterr10 Television Network
Sun Odia	2024	HD	Stereo | 2.0	Sun TV Network

=== News ===
Channel	Launch	Video	Audio	Owner
Star Odisha News	2015	SD	Stereo | 2.0	Star Odisha Media Services
ETV Bharat Odisha	2018	SD	Stereo | 2.0	ETV Network
News8 Odia	2020	SD	Stereo | 2.0	News8 Television Network Pvt Ltd
SwapnaPlus TV	2020	SD	Stereo | 2.0	SwapnaPlus TV Pvt Ltd
Zee Odisha News	2022	SD	Stereo | 2.0	Zee Media Corporation

=== Music ===
Channel	Launch	Video	Audio	Owner
Amara Muzik Odia	2015	HD	Stereo | 2.0	Amara Muzik Pvt Ltd
Sidharth Music	2016	HD	Stereo | 2.0	Sidharth TV Network
Zee Music Odia	2017	HD	Stereo | 2.0	Zee Media
Manjari Music	2020	HD	Stereo | 2.0	Sambad

== See also ==
- List of HD channels in India
