= Zee Bollyworld TV =

Zee Bollyworld Tv
- Country: Brazil
- Headquarters: Rio de Janeiro

Programming
- Picture format: 1080i (HDTV)

Ownership
- Owner: Zee Entertainment Enterprises; FilmOn
- Sister channels: List: Zee TV Zee Cinema Zee Action Zee Hindustan Zing Zee ETC Bollywood Zee Smile Zee News 9X Zee Telugu Zee Café Zee Bihar Jharkhand WION Zee Business Zee Salaam Zee Punjabi Zee Bangla Zee Kalinga Zee Marathi Zee Talkies Zee 24 Taas Zee Kannada Zee Tamil &Pictures &TV

History
- Launched: 10 July 2015; 11 years ago

Links
- Website: Website

Zee Bollyworld TV is an online Indian Bollywood high-definition (HD) television channel, which is owned and operated by Zee Entertainment Enterprises and FilmOn. A large Indian media group, Zee Entertainment Enterprises made a partnership with US-based online TV provider FilmOn.com to launch the TV channel.

The channel was launched on 10 July 2015, and is programmed to offer movies and other Indian content in Hindi with English subtitles, along with business programming regarding behind-the-scenes and studio dealings in the Bollywood system. The channel is made available free on computers, tablets and other mobile devices.

== Programming ==
Original programming on Zee Bollyworld TV has included Bollywood Families, Bollywood Business, Bollywood Life, Chillax Mornings, Back to Back Music, and Ek Ke Baad Ek.

== See also ==
- ETC Bollywood Business
