= Tarang Music =

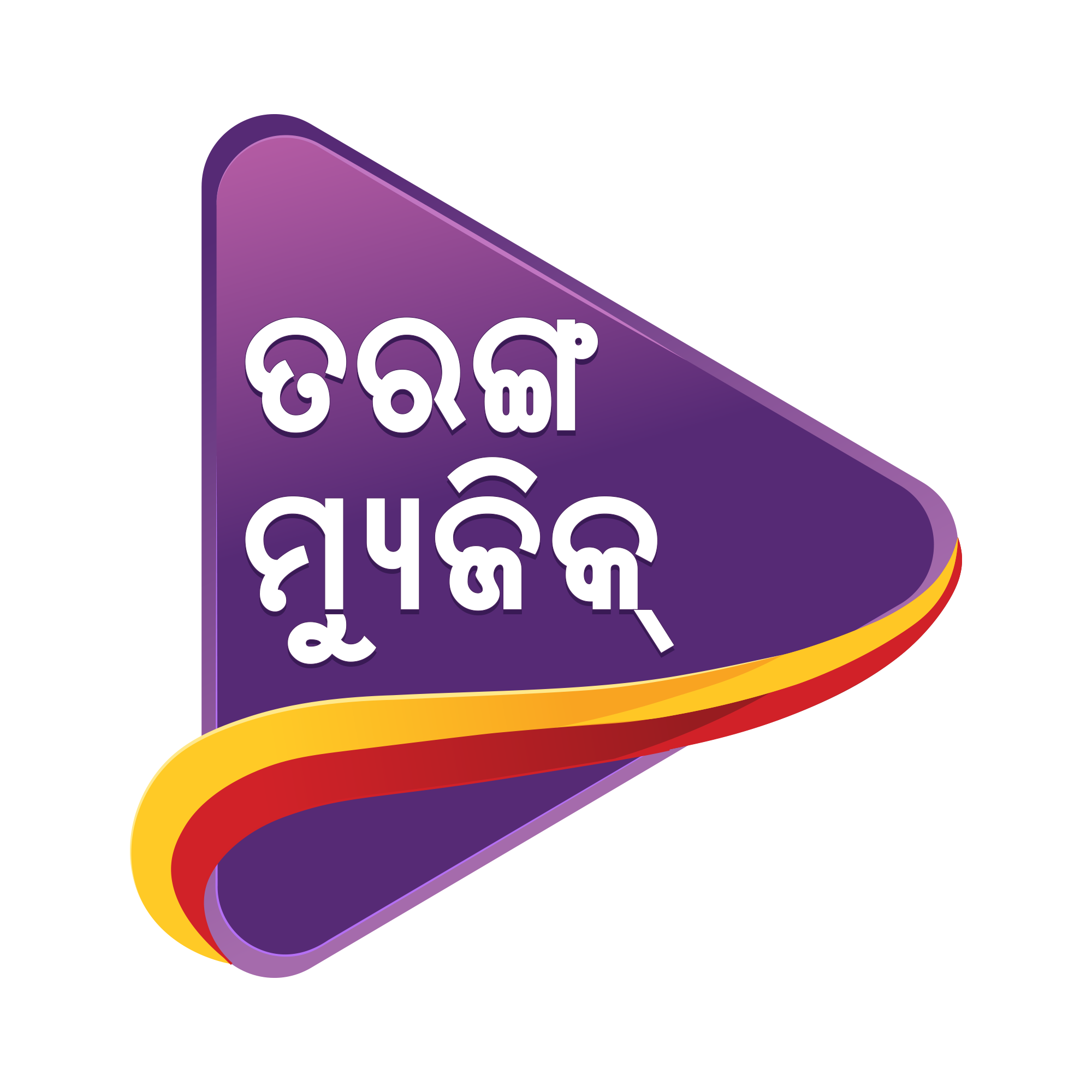
- Country: India
- Headquarters: Bhubaneswar, Odisha, India

Ownership
- Owner: Odisha Television Network
- Sister channels: OTV; Tarang; Prarthana Life; Alankar; Tarang Cine Productions; Odisha Reporter; Desh TV News; Odisha Plus; City Plus; TarangPlus; Feedin; 98.3 Tarang FM

History
- Launched: 2009

Tarang Music is a 24-hour music channel owned by Odisha Television Ltd of India. The channel features Odia music from Ollywood and music videos from Odisha. Through its broadcast and digital presence, Tarang Music has established itself as one of the most prominent platforms for Odia-language music content, reaching audience in Odisha and other Odia diaspora audience worldwide. Most of the shows in Tarang Music require call-in audience participation, where the callers speak to a video jockey and request songs that may be dedicated to their loved ones.

== List of Programs ==
All program shows video songs and comedy scenes mostly from Odia films and Odia Albums.

- Break Free
- Campus Khati
- Choice ra Gita
- Dil dosti music
- Film Superhit
- Kie jite kie hare
- Mo gaan ra Swara
- Nijhum Ratira Sathi
- Sakalu Sakalu Mane Pada
- Prem 100 by 100
- Top 10
- Top 20
- What's up Music
- Comedy De Danadan
- Breakless Music
- Gita Gaa-a Tanka Nia
- A Day With a Super Star
- Music Studio
- Kahana E Fula Kahana
- Weakend Classic Songs
- Public Demand
- Radio Time with RJ Ananya
- Oolywood Super first
- Film Time
- Tick Talk

== See also ==
- List of Odia-language television channels
- List of television stations in India
- List of South Asian television channels by country
