= Prameya =

Indian Odia-language newspaper

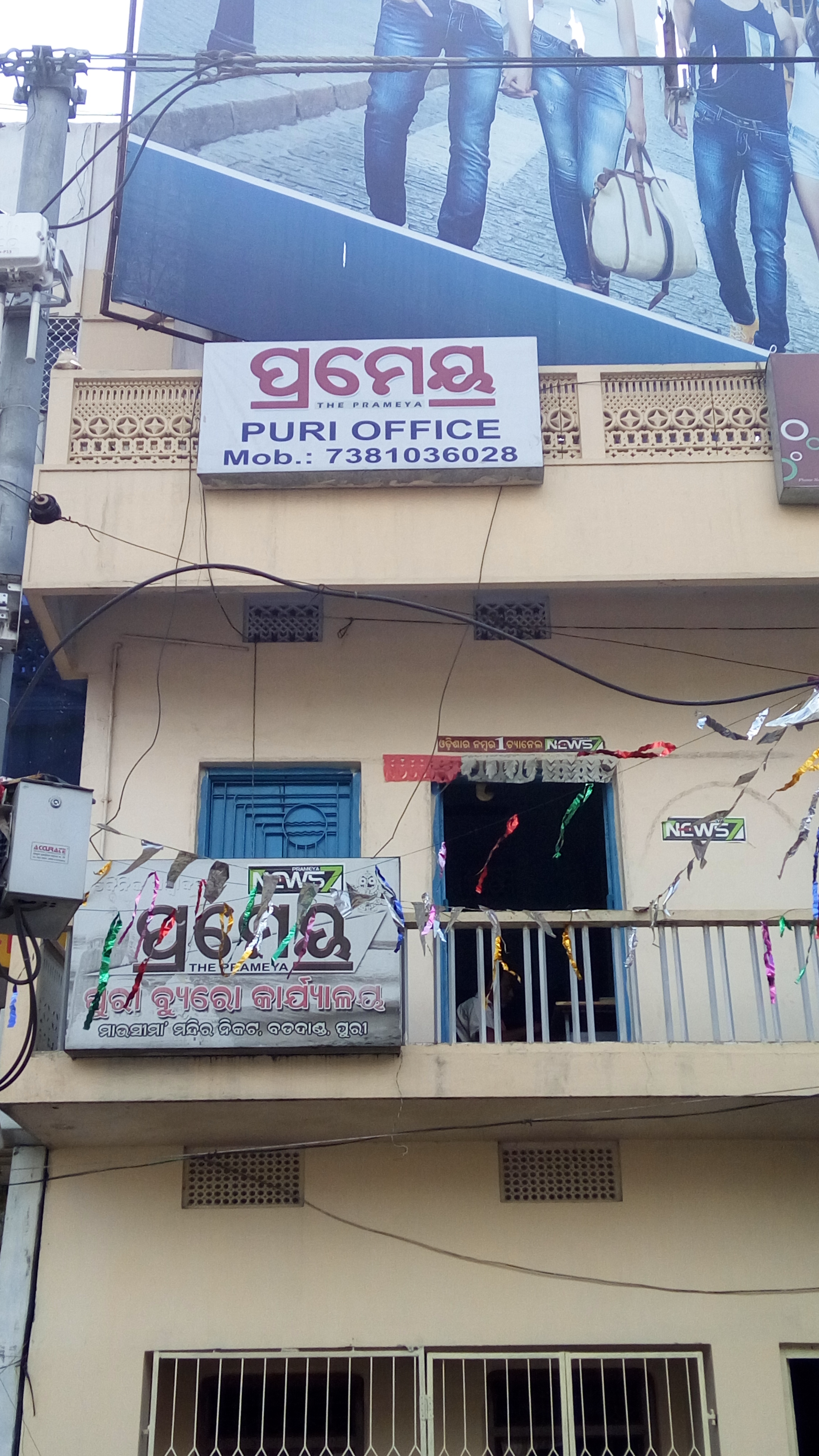
Prameya Office

The Prameya (ପ୍ରମେୟ), a newspaper published in the Odia language, is the third-most read newspaper in Odia (after Sambad and Samaja). In 2015, it launched its own TV channel, Prameya News7, available through satellite television.
