= Lists of television channels =

Lists of television channels include:

== Lists of television channels by content ==
- List of adult television channels
- List of documentary television channels
- List of movie television channels
- List of music video television channels
- List of news television channels
- List of sports television channels
- Specialty channel

== Lists of television channels by continent ==
- Africa
- Asia
- Europe
- North America
- Oceania
- South America

== Lists of television channels by country ==
- Afghanistan
- Australia
- Bangladesh
- Belarus
- Belgium
- Brazil
- Bulgaria
- Canada
- Caribbean Islands
- Chile
- Croatia
- China
- Germany
- Hungary
- India
- Indonesia
- Ireland
- Israeli
- Italy
- Malaysia
- Mexico
- Moldova
- New Zealand
- Pakistan
- Romania
- Singapore
- Serbia
- South Africa
- Thailand
- United Kingdom
- Vietnam

=== United States ===
- List of ATSC 3.0 television stations in the United States
- Over-the-air television networks
- Pay television channels
- Defunct networks

== Lists of television channels by language ==
- Azerbaijani
- Bengali
- Catalan
- Chinese
- Croatian
- Czech
- Estonian
- French
- German
- Greek
- Hungarian
- Icelandic
- Irish
- Italian
- Japanese
- Korean
- Kurdish
- Latvian
- Lithuanian
- Malay
- Nepali
- Norwegian
- Pashto
- Persian
- Polish
- Portuguese
- Romanian
- Russian
- Scottish
- Serbian
- Slovak
- Slovene
- Spanish
- Swedish
- Tajik
- Turkish
- Ukrainian
- Urdu
- Uzbek
- Welsh

=== Indian ===
- Assamese
- Bengali
- Bhojpuri
- English
- Gujarati
- Hindi
- Kannada
- Konkani
- Malayalam
- Marathi
- Meitei (Manipuri)
- Odia
- Punjabi
- Tamil
- Telugu

=== By language family ===
- Celtic

== See also ==
- List of cable television companies
- List of online video platforms
- List of streaming media services
- List of television networks by country
- Television channel frequencies
