= Tarang TV =

Indian Odia-language television network

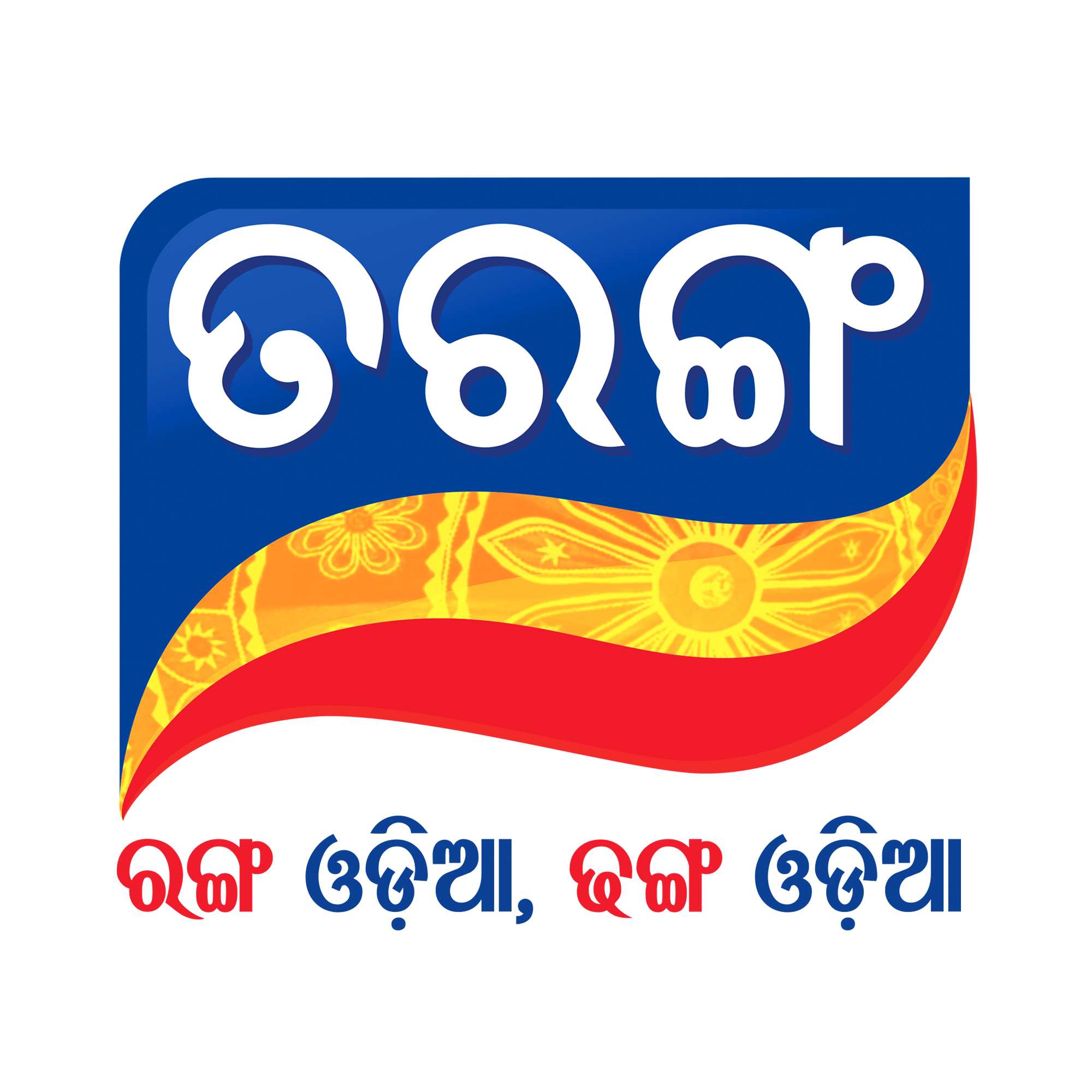
- Logo used since 2015
- Country: India
- Headquarters: Bhubaneswar, Odisha, India

Programming
- Picture format: 1080i HDTV

Ownership
- Owner: Odisha Television Network
- Sister channels: OTV; Tarang Music; Prarthana Life; Alankar; Tarang Cine Productions; Odisha Reporter; Desh TV News; Odisha Plus; City Plus; TarangPlus; Feedin; 98.3 Tarang FM

History
- Launched: August 15, 2008; 18 years ago

Links
- Website: tarangplus.in

Tarang TV, commonly known as Tarang Television, is an Odia-language based general entertainment television channel. Based in Bhubaneswar, India, it is owned by Odisha Television Ltd. Tarang is a digitally encrypted 24x7 Odia entertainment channel. It gives viewers family entertainment ranging from family shows to period drama and reality shows. Tarang TV's programming is targeted towards family audiences.

Tarang started broadcasting in 2008 as the third general entertainment channel in the language, its name means "wave" in Hindi. On 30 May 2023, Arun Ghosh was appointed its head of content, having moved from Zee's regional office in Kerala where he acquired films for the network.

== Current programming ==
=== Original series ===
Premiere date	Series
23 May 2026	Mankera Chatasala
8 June 2026	E Mana Manena
20 May 2024	Atuta Bandhan
29 May 2023	Tori Pain To Pain
25 February 2020	Mo Sindura Ra Adhikara
5 August 2024	Bada Bohu
3 February 2025	Odhani

=== Reality show ===
Premiere date	Show
6 June 2026	Raja Rajakumari 2026

== Former programming ==
- 72 Hours
- Abujha E Mana
- Ama Ghara Laxmi
- Ama Jhanshi Apa
- Anuradha
- Asha
- Avinandan
- Bachelor
- Bandhan Ae Jannma Jannmara
- Baya Gita
  - Baya Gita Anuchinta
- Bhagya Hate Dori
- Bohu
- Bohu Amara Sridevi
- Comedy Time
- Debabaani
- Devi
- Digital Jejema
- Dui Kulaku Hita Nikita
- Durga
- Durga Puja Special
- Ei Matira Katha
  - Chha' Mana Athaguntha
  - Daka Munsi
  - Kaa
  - Malajahna
  - Matira Manisha
  - Rebati
- Full Gadbad
- Puni Gadbad
- Golmaal
- Haribol
- Ina Mina Dika
- Jai Maa Laxmi
- Jai Phula
- Jibana Jamunare Juara Uthere
- Kahara Hebi Mun Kandhei
- Kana Kalaa Se
- Kanyadana
- Kalijai
- Kape Cha Dipada Katha
- Kemiti Ama Samparka
- Kunwari Bohu
- Laxmi Puran
- Lockdown Special
- Maaya
- Mahalaxmi
- Manabasa Gurubar
- Mangala Charana
- Mayabini
- Mo Sasura Sasumaa
- Nadi Phere Sagaraku
- Neijare Megha Mate
- Nua Bohu
- Jhia Amara Nua Bohu
- Odisha Music Concert
- Paka Kambala Pota Chhata, Suna Abolakara Purana Katha
- Premara Kuhuka
- Rajayoga
- Rajneeti
- Ranee
- Rakhile Sie Mariba Kie
- Rath Yatra Special
- Sahanai
- Salabega
- Sankha Sindura
- Savitri
- Shree Jagannath
- Shree Mandira
- Sindura
- Sindurara Adhikara
- Sister Sridevi Serial
- Swabhimaan
- Tara Tarini
- Tarini Akhira Tara
- To Akhi Mo Aaina
- Taraka Ra Kahani
- Tarang Cine Awards
  - Tarang Cine Utsav
- Tarang Live
- Tarang Parivaar Awards
  - Tarang Parivaar Utsav
- Tejaswini
- Titli
- Trilochanee Gouri
- Tu Mo Akhira Tara
- Tu Raja Mu Rani
- Uansi Kanya
- Women's Day Special
- Xcuse Me Jaha Kahibi Sata Kahibi Season 1, 2, 3 & 4

=== Reality shows ===
- Abhijit Dadara Lockdown Antakshyari
- Ama Raja Babu Ghara Khana Season 1, 2, 3 & 4
- Ama Swara Laxmi
- Ambika Khudinka Handisala
- Band Bajaa Barat - Melody Show
- Bhagyalaxmi
- Bhauja Aji Sata Kahibe
- Big Break Season 1 & 2
  - BIG BREAK 2022
- Comedy Darabar
- Cook Smart
- Dance Drama Dhamaka
- Dance Odisha Dance
- Family No. 1
- Gaon Akhada
- Gho Gha Raja
- Grand Melody Mahasangram
- Jatra Mahamukabila
- Jeetiba Odisha
- Jhoom Odisha Jhoom Season 1 & 2
  - Jhoom Odisha Jhoom Raja Muqabila
- Jinara Jeebanasathi
- Jito Odisha Jito
- Jodi No. 1 Season 1 & 2
- Kalinga Kanya
- Khanti Odia Jhia
- Ki & Ka
- Kitchen Hungama
- Malamaal Season 1, 2, 3, 4 & 5
- Masti Ra Pathshala
- Melody Nights With Abhijeet Majumdar Once More
- Mo Bou Hata Randha
  - Mo Bou Hata Randha 2024
- Mo Jibana Saathi
- Mr. Husband - Game Show
- Mu Bi Tejaswini
- Naivedya
- Pooja Dhamaka
- Raja Mauja
- Raja Rajakumari 2025
- Rajo Mahotsab
- Petu Nana Nka Peta Puja
- Sadhaba Bohu
- Smart Srimati
- Smile Please
- Tarang Parivaar Mahamuqabila Season 1, 2, 3, 4, 5, 6, 7, 8, 9, 10 & 11
- Utha Jago Odisha
- Voice of Odisha Season 1, 2, 3, 4 & 5
  - Voice of Odisha Junior

== See also ==
- List of Odia-language television channels
- List of longest-running Indian television series
- List of television stations in India
- List of South Asian television channels by country
