= Superstar Josh =

Odia-language television channel

Superstar Josh TV
- Type: Cable television network
- Branding: Superstar Josh TV
- Country: India
- Availability: Indian sub-continent
- Headquarters: Bhubaneswar, Odisha, India
- Launch date: 2009; 17 years ago
- Official website: www.joshtelevision.com

Superstar Josh TV is a 24-hour Odia satellite television channel, with its headquarters at Bhubaneswar, Odisha, India. It is promoted by Josh Television of Odisha.

The programmes of Superstar Josh are based on entertainment and infotainment. The aim of this channel is to entertain the viewers of Odisha with movies, music, mega serials, short stories, plays, video jockeys, astrological advice, beauty tips, recipes, tourist spots, and cultural programs, ceremonies, and events carried out in different parts of Odisha. The channel covers the latest happening of the Odia and Hindi film industries too. News of upcoming movies, albums, models, gossip of film personalities, growth of FM channels in Odisha and interviews with famous people of Odisha, is the prime content of this satellite TV channel.

Superstar Josh TV was established in 2009. This well known television channel is one such channel aired for the Odia-speaking viewers that caters to the interests of an entire family.

== List of programmes ==
- Alati
- Bhakti Arghya
- Dura Pruthibara Tara
- Geetanjali
- Haso Hasao Life Banao
- Josh Dance
- Kutting Chai
- Love Mail
- Nua Swara
- Pahili Phaguna
- Phalguni
- Celebrity talk shows/film gossip
- Comedy shows
- Daily astrology
- Daily soaps/mega serials (coming soon)
- Devotional programs
- Reality shows
- Romantic songs

== See also ==
- List of Odia-language television channels
- Lists of television channels in India
