= Prarthana =

Prarthana may refer to:

- Prayer in Hinduism, called prārthanā, Sanskrit for prayer
- Prarthana Samaj, a Hindu reform movement and society

== Arts and entertainment ==
- Prarthana (1943 film), a Hindi social film
- Prarthana (1978 film), an Indian Malayalam film
- Adaraneeya Prarthana, a Sri Lankan film
- Prarthana TV, an Odia language spiritual TV channel

== People ==
- Prarthana Behere (born 1983), Indian actress
- Prarthana Thombare (born 1994), Indian tennis player
- Prarthana Fardin Dighi, Bangladeshi film actress
- Prarthana Indrajith (born 2004), Indian playback singer

== Places ==
- Prarthana School in Padmanabhanagar, Bangalore, India
