= Calcutta News =

Calcutta News may refer to:

- Calcutta News (film)
- Calcutta News (TV channel)
