= Bhakta Tripathy =

- Bhakta Tripathy receiving an award
- Born: 1 May 1970 (age 56); Srimukundapur, Puri, Odisha, India
- Education: BA, MJMC
- Occupations: Chief Editor Of NEWS WORLD ODISHA, News anchor and Former Editor - ETV News Odia
- Years active: 1995–present
- Notable credit(s): Tasty Tasty; An Odia Foodie Programme Pujara Swada; Sidha Katha
- Website: www.bhaktatripathy.in

Bhakta Tripathy is the chief editor of News World Odisha. He is a senior television journalist of Odisha, India. He is former editor at ETV News Odia. Before this he was associated with Odisha TV as an input and investigative editor. During his stay at OTV, his special show- the first Odia popular food programme Tasty Tasty was a huge success. This show not only popularized the food culture of the state, but encouraged the state government to induct Tripathy in the Odisha Rasagola research committee. After leaving Odisha Television, Bhakta Tripathy joined as the Editor, Current Affairs in Focus Odisha TV which later turned to News World Odisha TV. Here also Bhakta Tripathy designed and produced a special foodie programme named Pujara Swada and Nuakhai.

== Career ==
Tripathy received a Master in Journalism & Mass Communication degree from the Utkal University. He started his journalism career with Sachitra Vijaya of Chennai-based Chandamama Group and the leading Oriya daily The Prajatantra. He then moved to The Sambad. He was chosen for the Outstanding Performer Award in the field of investigative reporting by The Sambad. Miscreants attempted several times to attack Bhakta Tripathy for his investigating reporting during his tenure in Western Odisha. He has unearthed a number of crimes and mafia raj in coal block areas by his reporting. Bhakta worked in several districts of Odisha and outside the State. He is former editor at ETV News Odia. Women trafficking in Nayagarh, ISI activities in Nuagaon, Nayagarh were some of the most talked stories reported by him. Nexus between Jail authorities and the criminal prisoners at Puri jail and roaming of prisoners in the broad day light brought to public notice by his report. This compelled the administration to suspend 7 police officials for this reason.

== Awards and accolades ==
In the year 1998, he was felicitated by Khurda NAC for the commendable achievement in the field of mass media. He also received an Outstanding Performer Award in the field of investigative reporting by The Sambad. He was given a Media Fellowship from "FFDA" Raipur (CG) based organization, for reporting on socioeconomic condition of Western Odisha Migrant Labourers in the year 2002. In the year 2003 he was chosen as the Best Journalist by Western Odisha weekly Janatara Bandhu. He has received "Bartabaha Sanman" by Boudha Pustak Mela in the year 2004. In the year 2010, he has received Sanjay Rout Memorial Talent Award by Utkal Sambadika Sangha.
