= Hello Doctor =

- Genre: Health Show
- Presented by: Manoj Kumar Tripathy; Sulagna Routray; Dr. Dipak Ranjan Das
- Composer: Sudhanshu Padhy
- Country of origin: India
- Original language: Odia

Production
- Producer: DD Odia
- Production locations: Doordarshan Kendra, Bhubaneswar; India
- Camera setup: Multi-camera
- Running time: Approx. 30 minutes
- Production companies: Prasar Bharti; Prasar Bharti

Hello Doctor or Health Scan also known as Health Show is a live phone-in television health show produced by national television DD Odia.

== Overview ==
The DD Odia Health Show embarks upon creating an interface between the remote viewers and the experts in medicine & public health. This show presents complex physiological and anatomical processes in simple and comprehensive audio-visual graphical presentations. During showtime many public health messages are aired that corresponded to the topic in the interest of viewers. With its growing popularity, this show is getting 7 to 8 telephonic questions from viewers per episode on average. Post-telecast feedback on the show continues to maintain its status among the top health shows on Odisha Television.
