= Kanak News =

News channel in Odisha, India

- Native name: Kanak News
- Company type: Private
- Industry: Pay TV
- Founded: 4 October 2009; 16 years ago
- Headquarters: Bhubaneswar, Odisha, India
- Products: Direct Broadcast Satellite
- Owner: Tanaya Patnaik
- Parent: Sambad
- Website: https://www.kanaknews.com/

Kanak News is an Odia language cable and satellite news channel in Bhubaneswar, Odisha, India. The channel was launched in 2009 as Kanak TV. Its headquarters is in Bhubaneswar and is operated by Eastern Media Pvt. Limited. Kanak News Channel is on GSAT 10 satellite as a free-to-air channel.

Its tagline is "Paribartanara Swara". As of 2015, programs include Jatra Chalichi, Jeebanara Canvas, Business Leaders, Crime Reporter, and Page 3.

== See also ==
- List of Odia-language television channels
- List of television stations in India
