= Chilika TV =

Indian Odia-language TV channel

CHILIKA TV
- Country: India
- Headquarters: Bhubaneswar, Odisha

Programming
- Language(s): Odia
- Picture format: 4:3 1080p SDTV

Ownership
- Owner: Might Production

History
- Launched: 15 August 2014; 10 years ago

Links
- Website: www.chilikatv.com

Chilika TV is a regional Odia language satellite television news and entertainment channel in India. It is based in Odisha.

== See also ==
- List of Odia-language television channels
- List of television stations in India
