= TV4 HD =

TV4 HD may refer to:

- TV4 HD (Sweden)
- TV4 HD (Poland), a planned Polish private television station

== See also ==
- Television in Sweden
- Television in Poland
- Lists of television channels
