= Mu Odia =

Mu Odia is a 24×7 Odia music channel which is broadcast from Bhubaneswar. MBC TV M/s Micro broadcast (MBC) has planned for "Mu Odia" to separate Entertainment contents from its existing TV channel.

== See also ==
- List of Odia-language television channels
