= Kalinga TV =

Indian Odia-language television channel

KALINGA TV
- Country: India
- Headquarters: Bhubaneswar, Odisha, India

Programming
- Language: Odia
- Picture format: 720p (HDTV)

Ownership
- Owner: Kalinga Media & Entertainment Pvt Ltd

History
- Launched: 17 April 2015; 10 years ago

Links
- Website: www.kalingatv.com

Kalinga TV is an Odia language 24-hour cable and satellite news channel in Bhubaneswar, Odisha, India. The channel was launched in April 2015 by Kalinga Media and Entertainment, a unit of KIIT Group of Institutions.

It is classified as Indian Non-Government Company and is registered at Registrar of Companies, Bhubaneswar.

== See also ==
- List of Odia-language television channels
- List of television stations in India
