= OK India =

Hindi language television news channel

- Country: India
- Broadcast area: India
- Headquarters: Rohtak, Haryana

Programming
- Language: Hindi
- Picture format: 576i (SDTV)

Ownership
- Owner: Jogender Singh
- Parent: OK Life Care
- Key people: Avinash Kumar Singh (editor)
- Sister channels: OK Music; Tora TV

History
- Launched: 15 April 2016
- Closed: 15 April 2022

Availability

Terrestrial
- Free Dish: Channel 102

Streaming media
- OK India: YouTube
- OK India: Jio Tv

OK India was an Indian satellite Hindi language television news channel, owned by Dr. Jogender Singh. It was launched on 15 April 2016. The channel was headquartered in Rohtak, Haryana and it was discontinued on 15 April 2022.

== History ==
The channel telecasted daily three-times news bulletin and especially one-hour broadcast Uttar Pradesh state news. The news channel was first broadcast on Tata Sky.

== Programs ==
- Morning top 100
- 1 P.M UP fresh news
- Bollywood Masala
- Evening fast news
- Prime Time Debate (Mudde Ki Baat) 8Pm
- Desh Ki Baat 9Pm Daily

The channel also broadcast entertainment news, agriculture and mainly telecast Haryana state news.

== See also ==
- Lord Buddha TV
- Jan TV
- List of Hindi-language television channels
- Lists of television channels in India
