= List of Gujarati-language television channels =

This is a list of Gujarati language television channels.

== Government owned channel ==
| Channel | Launch | Video | Audio | Owner | Notes |
|---|---|---|---|---|---|
| DD Girnar | 1994 | SD+HD | Stereo | 2.0 | Doordarshan, Prasar Bharati | Official channel of the State Government of Gujarat |

== General entertainment ==
| Channel | Launch | Video | Audio | Owner | Notes |
|---|---|---|---|---|---|
| Colors Gujarati | 2002 | SD | Stereo | 2.0 | JioStar | Formerly known as ETV Gujarati |

=== Defunct ===
| Channel | Launch | Defunct | Video | Audio | Owner | Notes |
|---|---|---|---|---|---|---|
| Zee Gujarati | 2000 | 2009 | SD | Stereo | 2.0 | Zee Entertainment Enterprises | First Gujarati GEC and formerly known as Alpha TV Gujarati |

== Movies ==
| Channel | Launch | Video | Audio | Owner | Notes |
|---|---|---|---|---|---|
| Colors Gujarati Cinema | 2019 | SD | Stereo | 2.0 | JioStar | First and only Gujarati movie channel |

== Kids ==
=== Audio feed ===
- Nickelodeon (Formerly)
- Sonic (Formerly)
- Sony YAY!

== News ==
| Channel | Launch | Video | Audio | Owner | Notes |
|---|---|---|---|---|---|
| TV9 Gujarati | 2007 | SD | Stereo | 2.0 | ABCL Broadcasting | First Gujarati 24x7 news channel |
| VTV Gujarati | 2011 | SD | Stereo | 2.0 | Gujarat News Broadcasters Pvt Ltd | |
| GSTV | 2012 | SD | Stereo | 2.0 | Shreyarth Aaspas Limited | |
| Business18 3 | 2014 | SD | Stereo | 2.0 | Star (Disney+) | |
| News18 10 | 2014 | SD | Stereo | 2.0 | Star (Disney+) | Formerly known as ETV News Gujarati |
| Sandesh News | 2014 | SD | Stereo | 2.0 | Sandesh Group | |
| ABP Asmita | 2016 | SD | Stereo | 2.0 | ABP Group | |
| Zee 24 Kalak | 2017 | SD | Stereo | 2.0 | Zee Media Corporation | |

== HD Channel ==
1 available channel
| Channel name | Genre | Video | Audio | Broadcast | Launch date | Owner | Notes |
|---|---|---|---|---|---|---|---|
| DD Girnar HD | General entertainment | Full HD | Stereo | 2.0 | Own Schedule | 11 July 2025 | Prasar Bharati | |
