= Colors Bangla =

Indian general entertainment pay TV channel

- Logo used since 2016
- Country: India
- Broadcast area: India; Bangladesh; North America
- Headquarters: Kolkata, West Bengal, India

Programming
- Language: Bengali
- Picture format: 1080p HDTV

Ownership
- Owner: JioStar
- Sister channels: List: Colors TV; Rishtey Cineplex; Colors Marathi; Sports18; Colors Gujarati; Sports18 1; Colors Gujarati Cinema; Sports18 Khel; Colors Rishtey; Colors Bangla Cinema; Colors Kannada; Colors Kannada Cinema; Colors Odia; Colors Infinity; Colors Cineplex; Colors Cineplex Bollywood; Colors Super; Colors Tamil

History
- Launched: 15 April 2000; 26 years ago (as ETV Bangla); 12 April 2015; 11 years ago (as Colors Bangla)
- Replaced: ETV Bangla (2000–2015)

Links
- Website: www.colorsbangla.com

Colors Bangla, previously known as ETV Bangla, is an Indian Bengali-language general entertainment pay television channel owned by JioStar and part of the Colors brand. It was originally launched in 2000 as ETV Bangla, owned by the Hyderabad-based ETV Network. The channel was later sold to TV18 and was rebranded under the Colors moniker on 12 April 2015.

== History ==
In order to compete with Bangladesh's ATN Bangla, which was gaining popularity in West Bengal, both Zee Telefilms and Eenadu-owned ETV Network planned to launch Bengali-language regional channels. Eenadu originally planned to launch its Bengali GEC before October 1999 as "Gitanjali" featuring a mix of entertainment and news programming. It was eventually launched on 15 April 2000 as ETV Bangla, and immediately grew to become the leading television channel among West Bengal audiences. ETV Bangla became available to audiences in the United States via DirecTV in May 2005. In May 2010, ETV Bangla collaborated with Anjan Dutt and Kaushik Ganguly for twelve telefilms under the newly launched ETV Bangla Movies.

In July 2011, Multi-Screen Media, the owners of Sony channels in India, was initially set to buy Eenadu's regional television channels, including ETV Bangla, in a INR 2,250-2,400 crore deal. However, the channels were announced to be sold to Network18 following a Broadcast Board of Directors meeting on 3 January 2012. ETV Bangla came under 50% ownership by TV18 as a result, and was eventually fully acquired after the finalization of the deal in January 2014, while retaining the 'ETV' branding. Its news counterpart, ETV News Bangla, was launched on 10 March 2014. On 22 April 2014, Sujay Raghavan was appointed head of ETV Bangla, along with ETV Odia.

ETV Bangla was rebranded under the Colors moniker on 12 April 2015. Its high-definition counterpart was launched in May 2016. The channel aired the Filmfare Awards East 2017. The last remaining 'ETV' branded Bengali channel, ETV News Bangla, was rebranded as News18 Bangla in March 2018. Viacom18 announced on 6 April 2021 that Sagnik Ghosh was appointed as the business head of Colors Bangla, replacing Rahul Chakravarti who had helped the channel's growth to become the third most watched Bengali GEC from India. On 30 August 2021, on account of Janmashtami, Colors Bangla rebranded its motion graphics and channel interface, introducing a new tagline, "Notun Shopner Rong". In November 2024, Vivek Modi was appointed to lead Colors Bangla.

== Programming ==
=== Original programming ===
| Title | Premiere date | Last aired |
|---|---|---|
| Binni Dhaner Khoi | 31 August 2009 | 16 March 2013 |
| Byomkesh | 20 November 2014 | 14 November 2015 |
| Shubho Drishti | 1 January 2018 | 12 January 2019 |
| Jaahanara | 30 August 2019 | |
| Nishir Daak | 3 December 2018 | 21 March 2020 |
| Chirodini Ami Je Tomar | 29 July 2019 | 21 March 2020 |
| Dutta and Bouma | 30 August 2021 | 23 January 2022 |
| Mon Mane Na | 30 August 2021 | 05 June 2022 |
| Sona Roder Gaan | 24 January 2022 | 27 November 2022 |
| Tumpa Autowali | 16 May 2022 | 31 March 2024 |
| Tumii Je Amar Maa | 6 June 2022 | 4 February 2024 |
| Indrani | 18 July 2022 | 9 April 2023 |
| Nayika No.1 | 6 March 2023 | 2 December 2023 |

=== Acquired progrmaming ===
- Adorer Chhowa
- Barrister Babu
- Bish
- Chakravartin Ashoka Samrat
- Chandrakanta
- Chena Ochena
- Choti Sarrdaarni
- Code Red
- Debangshi
- Kena Bou
- Kichhu toh Acchei: Nagin
- Koboch Mahashiboratri
- Kotha Kahini
- Naagin 1, 2, 3, 4, 5, 6
- Pran Bhomra
- Premer Agun
- Proloy theke Sristi — Mohakali
- Ram Sitar Luv Kush
- Shokti Astitver Anubhutir
- Sobar Boro Thakur Shani
- Sopoth Bhalobasar
- Srijar Shwoshurbari
- Tontro Montro

=== Reality shows ===
- Bigg Boss Bangla
- Bigg Boss Bangla 1
- Bigg Boss Bangla 2
- Ke Hobe Banglar Kotipoti (season 2)
- Rojgere Ginni

== Sister channel ==
=== Colors Bangla Cinema ===
Colors Bangla Cinema is an Indian pay television movie channel broadcasting in Bengali language owned by Viacom18. It was launched in February 2019.
