= Zee Studio =

- Logo from January 1, 2018
- Country: India
- Broadcast area: Indian subcontinent
- Network: Zee Entertainment Enterprises
- Headquarters: Mumbai, Maharashtra, India

Programming
- Language: English
- Picture format: 576i (SDTV); 1080i (HDTV)

Ownership
- Owner: Zee Entertainment Enterprises
- Sister channels: Zee Café

History
- Launched: 15 March 2000; 25 years ago
- Closed: 31 May 2018; 7 years ago
- Replaced by: &flix
- Former names: Zee MGM

Links
- Website: ZeeStudio.tv

Zee Studio was an Indian English-language television channel featuring Hollywood films. It was part of the wider Zee Network.

== History ==
The second logo of Zee Studio, used from November 2010 until 18 June 2011

The third logo of Zee Studio

The channel was launched on 15 March 2000 as Zee Movies. In October 2000, Zee entered into a joint venture with MGM and the channel was rebranded as Zee MGM. After MGM was bought by Sony, the channel name was changed to Zee Movie Zone (ZMZ) on 1 October 2004. On 28 March 2005, as part of Zee Network's revamp, it was renamed Zee Studio. Anurag Bedi is the business head of Zee studio along with other niche channels part of the Zee bouquet. Its HD counterpart was launched on 15 August 2011.

The Zee Studio brand was discontinued on 31 May 2018, with &flix being the new English movie channel.
