= News18 Odia =

Indian Odia-language TV news channel

- Country: India
- Broadcast area: India
- Headquarters: Bhubaneswar, Odisha, India

Programming
- Language: Odia
- Picture format: 4:3 (576i, SDTV)

Ownership
- Owner: Network18 Group
- Sister channels: Network18 Group channels

History
- Launched: 4 May 2015; 10 years ago
- Replaced: ETV News Odia

Links
- Website: odia.news18.com

Availability

Streaming media
- Live Streaming: Watch Live

News18 Odia is an Odia news channel. It is owned by Network18 Group, which launched on 4 May 2015. Its tagline is 'News is Life'. ETV News Odia is a part of the ETV News Network, one of the largest satellite television channels in India. ETV News Odia is the 10th regional news channel of the ETV News Network in India. Nilambar Rath was the channel's first editor.

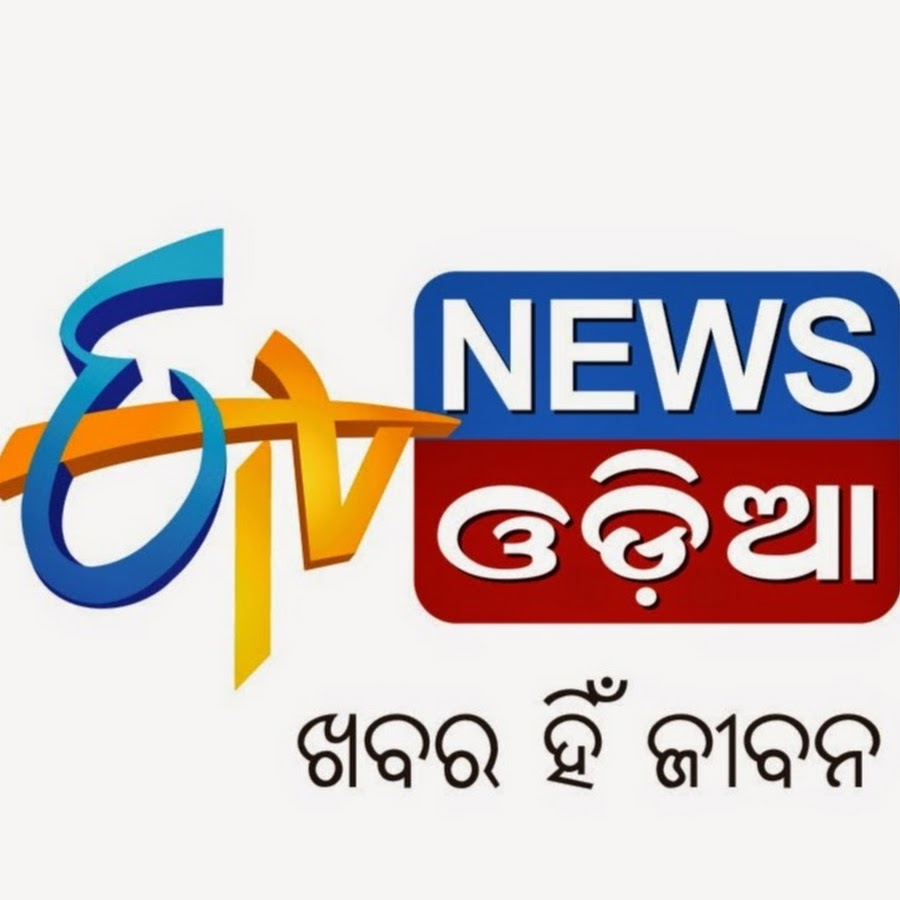
Previous ETV News Odia logo from 4 May 2015 to 20 October 2017

== List of programmes ==
- Chhota Mora Gaonti
- Sidha Katha
- Abhula Gita
- E-Cafe
- Kana Kala Ma
- Crime Bureau
- Mantra Mahima
- Kathare Kathare
- Annadata
- Hakim Babu
- My Doctor
- Aapananka Bhagya

== Editors ==
- Nilambar Rath (May 2015 to November 2015)
- Bhakta Tripathy (January 2016 to October 2016)
- Satyaprakash Nayak (March 2017 to December 2017)
- Dayanidhi Dash (2017 to 2022)
- Narendra jena (present editor)

== See also ==
- List of Odia-language television channels
