= Focus Bangla =

Indian Bengali news channel

- Country: India
- Broadcast area: West Bengal and Tripura
- Headquarters: Kolkata, West Bengal, India

Programming
- Language: Bengali
- Picture format: 576i SDTV

Ownership
- Sister channels: Focus NE; Focus Hi-Fi

History
- Launched: 2004; 22 years ago

Focus Bangla (formerly known as NE Bangla) was an Indian Bengali language 24x7 news channel launched in 2004 and owned by Rainbow Productions Ltd. It's Bengali-language programming created and provided from Agartala (capital of Tripura State in Northeast India) and Kolkata (capital of West Bengal state).

The old logo during 2010

The channel features programs covering major daily incidents and analyses of significant news events. In addition to news from North East and West Bengal, it includes national and international coverage and highlights issues affecting the common people in the state.

== See also ==
- International broadcasting
- List of Indian television stations
- 24-hour television news channels
