= Janasri News =

Indian Kannada-language television news channel

- Country: India
- Headquarters: Bengaluru, Karnataka, India

Programming
- Language: Kannada

Ownership
- Owner: janasree midea india Pvt Ltd. Kavita Prabhu & Sanjay Savant

History
- Launched: 11 December 2020

Links
- Website: www.janasritvonline

Janasri News was a 24x7 Kannada news and infotainment television channel that was launched on 18 February 2011 with the tagline "Jana Mana Dani" which means "Voice of the people". The channel was owned by Janasri media india Pvt Ltd. which was promoted by Karnataka Politicians Janardhana Reddy and Sriramulu.

The news channel was spearhead by Anantha Chinivar and other groups of media professionals with a combined media experience of over three decades. The head office and news studio which was situated in Bangalore was equipped with the state-of-the-art broadcast technology which was never seen before in Kannada News Industry. The studio was spread across 25 thousand square feet area and included two highly advanced studios.

The channel soon became second most watched news channel in Karnataka and was re-launched with new look and feel during its second anniversary. Since then the channel changed hands and was re-launched several times but failed to sustain the same viewership in the coming days due to political reasons.

== Controversies ==
On 14 April 2017, an FIR was filed against this channel for extortion of money from various financial institutions like IMA and Injaz. The CEO of this channel was arrested and sent to judicial custody.

== See also ==
- List of Kannada-language television channels
- Television in India
- Media in Karnataka
- Media of India
