= Prameya News7 =

Odisha, India news channel

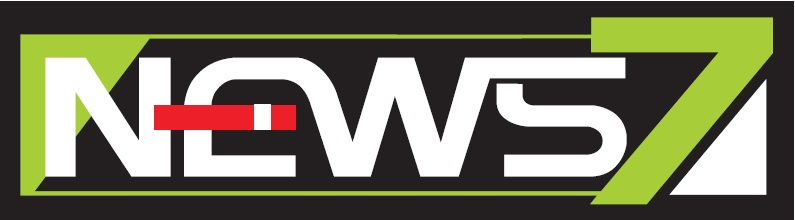
- Company type: Private
- Traded as: Summa Real Media Pvt Ltd
- Industry: Pay TV
- Founded: 2015
- Headquarters: Bhubaneswar, Odisha, India
- Key people: Deba Shetty
- Products: Direct broadcast satellite
- Number of employees: 200+
- Website: www.prameyanews7.com

Prameya News7 is an Odia language 24-hour cable and satellite news channel in Bhubaneswar, Odisha, India. It comes under the aegis of Summa Real Media which also has the largely circulated daily Odia News Paper ‘Prameya’, as the Print News.

Summa Real Media is a part of the business conglomerate having SOA University which has nine degree granting schools and colleges imparting nationally accredited courses like engineering (ITER), medicine (IMS), pharmacy, business, nursing, biotechnology, science, humanities, environment, nano technology, materials science, agriculture and law, SUM Hospital which is renowned to give super speciality treatment at affordable costs and the only hospital who set up a 500-bed facility specially for the corona pandemic afflicted and a community radio SOA 90.4 FM.

The driving force and promoter of the conglomerate being Dr Prof Manoj Ranjan Nayak, News 7 flaunts media stalwarts like Shri Gopalkrishna Mohapatra as the group editor of SUMMA Real Media and Mr Sunil Kumar Das as the group CEO.

News 7 brings to the Odia viewer an assortment of programs of various genre without losing the flair of a News channels. It is more popular for its unbiased news sensations conducted through sting operations, by which they bring to light the various fraudulent, immoral and corrupt activities happening in the state. The most famous among these are exposing the fake Godman Sarathi Baba in 2015 (which was the major reason for the channel shooting to fame), Dal scam, Casting Couch in Ollywood, Operation on Sand Mafia, extortion to name a few. Apart from this they also cover major national news, as well as good analytical debates by experts of burning issues in the state, country as well as the globe in their programs like 9PM Live, Bada Khabar, Maha Bitarka etc. They also give the viewer a good dollop of entertainment through programs like Magana Oliki (a comical satirical take on issues in society), Breakfast Odisha (Celebrity Chat Show), religious and astrological programs like Baichadhei Ra Basa & Kaalchakra, thriller programs on crime, mysteries and the paranormal like Khoj & Biswaas Abiswaas etc. The Special News Bulletin and Big Story follow up cover the current sensational happenings as well as they have other light hearted programs like Golden Moments, filmy fever etc.

== See also ==
- List of Odia-language television channels
- List of television stations in India
