= R9 TV =

Hindi-language Regional News Channel

- Country: India
- Broadcast area: Uttar Pradesh & Uttarakhand, India
- Headquarters: Uttar Pradesh, India

Programming
- Language: Hindi
- Picture format: 16:9 (576i, SDTV)

History
- Launched: 12 September 2019

Links
- Website: Official Website

R9 TV is a Hindi-language regional news channel that is broadcast in Uttar Pradesh and Uttarakhand. It was launched on September 12, 2019, and is available on Tata Sky, Airtel, Dish TV and other platforms. Amitabh Agnihotri serves as the editor-in-chief for the channel. On 22 September 2020, Umesh Kumar joined R9 TV as the news director and chief executive officer.

== Founders ==
With a motto of Rashtradharm Sarvapratham and a mission to become the voice of the nation, this channel was started by 4 entrepreneurs:

- Avinash Kumar
- Karan Mohan
- Vinod Singh
- Sunil Tripathy
