= DD Odia =

Indian Odia-language public TV channel

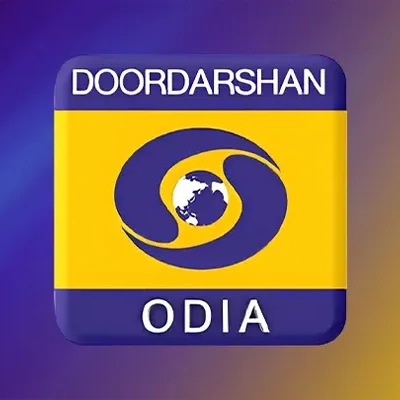
- Logo used since 2013
- Type: Broadcast television network
- Country: India
- Availability: India and parts of Asia, China and Gulf countries.
- Headquarters: Bhubaneshwar, Odisha, India
- Owner: Prasar Bharati
- Launch date: 15 August 1994; 32 years ago as DD-6; 1 April 2001; 25 years ago as DD Odia
- Former names: DD-6
- Picture format: 1080i HDTV
- Official website: Official Website
- Language: Odia, Santali, Sambalpuri

DD Odia is an Indian Odia-language state-owned television network serving the state of Odisha, supported by the Doordarshan stations in Bhubaneshwar, Sambalpur, and Bhawanipatna, launched in 1994. It is a generalist television network airing entertainment, cultural, and infotainment programming, along with news and current affairs.

== History ==
DD Odia is a satellite channel broadcasting in Odia, launched in 1994. DD Odia broadcasts serials, cultural programmes, infotainment programmes, news and current affairs etc. Most of its programmes are produced at Doordarshan Kendras of Bhubaneshwar, Sambalpur and Bhawanipatna. While the weekly transmission hours for the terrestrial channel with satellite support is 37 hours and 30 min, for the satellite (DD-6-Odia) it is 168 hours. DD-6 programmes are mostly related to Odia films, folk dance, music, and other cultural programmes only besides regional news. DD Odia grabs about 29% of the Total Market share in India. It reaches to almost 23% of the total population in India.

== See also ==
- List of Odia-language television channels
- List of longest-running Indian television series
- Ministry of Information and Broadcasting
- Lists of television channels in India
- All India Radio
