= Kamyab TV =

Odia language news channel

- Company type: Private
- Traded as: KAMYAB Television Private Limited
- Industry: Free-to-air
- Founded: 2009
- Headquarters: Bhubaneswar, Odisha, India
- Key people: Manoj Das
- Products: Direct broadcast satellite
- Website: www.kamyabtv.com

Kamyab TV is a 24-hour Odia language general entertainment TV channel. It broadcasts various regional programs related to family entertainment, current affair, discussion and news. Kamyab TV got license from Union Ministry of IB in 2009.

Kamyab TV is available in INSAT-4A satellite in MPEG-4 format. It is headquartered in Bhubaneswar. Two serials Ganga Jamuna Saraswati and Dhara Shravan are broadcast on Kamyab TV.

== See also ==
- List of Oriya-language television channels
