= List of Meitei-language television channels =

Position of Manipur in India

This is a list of satellite, digital and cable television channels in Meitei language broadcasting at least throughout Manipur and other Northeast Indian states.

== Government owned channels ==
Channel	Logo	Launch	Website(s)	Parent company	Notes
DD Manipur (DDK IMPHAL)		1998	ddmanipur.org	Doordarshan, Prasar Bharati	24x7 satellite TV channel of Manipur, first official channel of the State Government of Manipur, broadcasts art and culture programmes in Manipur and beyond
DD News Manipur ("DD News Imphal" or "DDK IMPHAL RNU")		2005	ddmanipur.org	Doordarshan, Prasar Bharati	Government owned news channel of Manipur

== Educational channels ==
Channel	Logo	Launch	Parent company	Notes
Lairik TV		2020	Department of Education, Government of Manipur	first-ever educational channel of Manipur

== Entertainment and music channels ==
Channel	Logo	Launch	Website(s)	Parent company	Notes
Image TV		2003		IMAGE (Insat Mass-Media and Global Entertainment) TV ("Town Cable" and "Saya Cable" merged and formed the IMAGE TV in 2003)	Second television channel after the ISTV in the valley areas of Manipur
Impact Entertainment		2013	impacttv.in	The Impact Medianet & Communication (P) Ltd	IMPACT TV Network has 6 channels including "Impact TV News", which broadcast sports, culture, education, music, film industry and entertainment programmes of Manipur.
Impact Music		2013	impacttv.in	The Impact Medianet & Communication (P) Ltd	IMPACT TV Network has 6 channels including "Impact TV News", which broadcast sports, culture, education, music, film industry and entertainment programmes of Manipur.
Impact Mix		2013	impacttv.in	The Impact Medianet & Communication (P) Ltd	IMPACT TV Network has 6 channels including "Impact TV News", which broadcast sports, culture, education, music, film industry and entertainment programmes of Manipur.
Impact Manipur		2013	impacttv.in	The Impact Medianet & Communication (P) Ltd	IMPACT TV Network has 6 channels including "Impact TV News", which broadcast sports, culture, education, music, film industry and entertainment programmes of Manipur.
Impact Kumhei		2013	impacttv.in	The Impact Medianet & Communication (P) Ltd	IMPACT TV Network has 6 channels including "Impact TV News", which broadcast sports, culture, education, music, film industry and entertainment programmes of Manipur.
MAMI TV (Manipuri Art of Moving Image) TV		2018	mamitv.in	MAMI TV NETWORK (Manipuri Art of Moving Image) TV Network	It broadcasts art and culture related entertainment programs of Manipur.
PONY TV NEWS AND ENTERTAINMENT		2021		PONY TV	
7Salai		2020			News and entertainment channel

== News channels ==
Channel	Logo	Launch	Official website(s)	Parent company	Notes
DD News Manipur ("DD News Imphal" or "DDK IMPHAL RNU")		2005		Doordarshan, Prasar Bharati	Government owned news channel of Manipur
Elite TV		2021	elitetv.in	Elite Group of Communications and Network	first 24x7 news channel of Manipur
Image TV News		2003		IMAGE (Insat Mass-Media and Global Entertainment) TV ("Town Cable" and "Saya Cable" merged and formed the IMAGE TV in 2003)	Second television channel after the ISTV in the valley areas of Manipur
Impact TV News		2013	impacttv.in	The Impact Medianet & Communication (P) Ltd	Manipur's first international news providing channel
ISTV News		2003	istvimphal.net	Information Service Television Network (ISTV Network)	
TOM TV (Lamjingba "Times of Manipur")		2018	www.timesofmanipur.com	Lamjingba Group	first satellite TV channel of Manipur
MAMI TV (Manipuri Art of Moving Image) TV		2018	mamitv.in	MAMI TV NETWORK (Manipuri Art of Moving Image) TV Network	
PONY TV NEWS AND ENTERTAINMENT		2021		PONY TV	
7Salai News		2020			News and entertainment channel
NeTV					Northeast India's first private commercial satellite 24x7 television channel; Manipuri is one of the languages broadcast on this channel.

== See also ==
- Directorate of Language Planning and Implementation
- Manipuri Language Day
- List of Meitei-language films
- List of Meitei-language newspapers
- List of HD channels in India
- Assamese television channels
- Bengali television channels
- Hindi television channels
