= Pratibimba =

Dashboard showcasing the government of the Indian State of Karnataka's performance

- Available in: English; Kannada
- Owner: Government of Karnataka
- Website: www.pratibimba.karnataka.gov.in
- Commercial: No
- Launched: 7 March 2017; 9 years ago
- Current status: Online

Pratibimba is a dashboard that showcases the performance of the government of the Indian State of Karnataka. Launched with the aim to improve efficiency in governance and allow citizens to track the government's progress, it has tools to report, track and measure departmental performance on governmental programmes, projects and promises made.

== History ==
The Andhra Pradesh Chief Minister's Office Real time Executive Dashboard (AP CM Dashboard) created and managed by Real Time Governance Society (RTGS) as part of the E-Pragati Programme went online in 2016. The Data in Dashboard updated in real time basis through IoT Devices, It will be operated directly from the Chief Minister's office and it will be considered as one of India's best e-governance initiative. Performance indicators and work carried out by 33 departments of the government could be accessed. Pratibimba, which translates to reflection, was modeled on this and was launched on 7 March 2017. Chief Minister of Karnataka Siddaramaiah said at the launch, "Pratibimba will help people across the state and the country to get a detailed information regarding the steps taken by us in fulfilling our promise of transparent, responsible and people friendly government."
