= VH1 (India) =

Defunct Indian television channel (2005–2025)

- Final logo, used from 2016 to 2025
- Country: India
- Broadcast area: Bangladesh; Bhutan; India; Maldives; Nepal; Sri Lanka
- Headquarters: Mumbai, Maharashtra, India

Programming
- Language: English
- Picture format: 1080i HDTV (downscaled to 576i for the SDTV feed)

Ownership
- Owner: Viacom18 (branding licensed from Paramount Networks EMEAA)
- Parent: Viacom18

History
- Launched: 2005; 21 years ago
- Closed: March 15, 2025; 18 months ago

Links
- Website: vh1.in

VH1 was an Indian pay television music television channel and pop culture channel. It was launched in 2005 as a result of a joint venture between MTV India and Zee-Turner, based on the American channel of the same name. It broadcast shows like VH1 Top 10, Hit Factory, Good Morning VH1, VH1 Playlist and VH1 Kpopp'd. It also aired MTV international shows. It was owned by Viacom18 under a license agreement with Paramount Networks EMEAA. VH1 and its HD feed were discontinued on March 15, 2025.
