= DD Girnar =

Indian Gujarati-language public television channel

- Country: India
- Broadcast area: India
- Network: DD (Doordarshan)
- Headquarters: Ahmedabad, Gujarat, India

Programming
- Language: Gujarati
- Picture format: 1080i HDTV

Ownership
- Owner: Prasar Bharati

History
- Launched: 2003 (as Doordarshan Kendra Ahmedabad)
- Former names: Doordarshan Kendra Ahmedabad

Links
- Website: Official Website

DD Girnar (formerly DD-10 Gujarati) is an Indian Gujarati-language television channel, owned and operated by Doordarshan, a part of the public broadcaster, Prasar Bharati. It is broadcast out of studios at Doordarshan Kendra in Ahmedabad in Gujarat.

== History ==
Doordarshan Kendra, Ahmedabad was set up on 15 March 1976, as a part of the Satellite Instructional Television Experiment SITE Project of ISRO and the 1 KW transmitter was based in PIJ, Kheda District. The studio used to function from the ISRO, Ahmedabad premises, while the administrative office was located in the Polytechnic compound in Ahmedabad.

Few years later, a plot of land was identified and a low power LPT was set up in Ahmedabad in Thaltej Tekra on 19 November 1983. The studio was commissioned on 2 October 1987 while the regional language uplinking was started on 30 December 1992. DD Girnar started its 24-hour transmission on 1 October 1993.

== List of programmes currently broadcast ==
- Rasoi ni Rangat (રસોઈ ની રંગત)
- Ek Dal na Pankhi (એક ડાળ ના પંખી) (re-run)
- One Minute (એક મિનિટ)
- Gram Jagat (ગ્રામ જગત)
- Filmi Sargam (ફિલ્મી સરગમ)
- Kaka ni Kamal (કાકા ની કમાલ)
- Kuvara Corporation (કુંવારા કોર્પોરેશન)
- Gammat Gulal (ગમ્મત ગુલાલ)

== See also ==
- List of programs broadcast by DD National
- All India Radio
- Ministry of Information and Broadcasting
- DD Free Dish
- List of South Asian television channels by country
