= High News =

24-hour Bengali news channel launched in 2010

High News is a 24-hour Bengali news channel launched by the company High Media Infotainment INDIA Ltd. in 2010. The company also runs a Bengali newspaper (Uttarer Saradin). The channel is on the INSAT-4A communications satellite at 83 degrees.

== Sister concerns ==
- High TV - The channel operates only in Maldah and in the Dinajpur Districts of West Bengal
- Uttarer Saradin - A north Bengal daily morning newspaper
- Radio Milan 90.4 FM Jhargram. The station can be listened through Bangla Tune Android App, online, throughout the world.
