= Zee Bharat =

Hindi news channel

- Country: India
- Headquarters: Noida, Uttar Pradesh

Programming
- Language: Hindi
- Picture format: 576i (SDTV 16:9, 4:3)

Ownership
- Owner: Zee Media Corporation Limited
- Sister channels: Zee News; Zee Business

History
- Launched: 21 May 2017; 9 years ago

Availability

Streaming media
- ZEE5: Zee Hindustan

Zee Bharat is an Indian Hindi-language television news channel, owned by Zee Media. It was first launched as Zee News Uttarakhand and Uttar Pradesh in 2006 and in 2013, it was rebranded as Zee Sangam. In 2016, the channel was again rebranded as India 24×7, and in 2017 as Zee Hindustan, under the leadership of the then-CEO of Zee Media's regional news division, Jagdish Chandra.

It had been launched as part of the Essel Group's efforts to establish a 'nationalist' news channel, in 2017. In 2018, the Essel Group announced that the channel would be 'anchor-less' and would present news without news anchors or news readers. The channel has faced frequent criticism and criminal complaints for sharing incorrect or misleading news.

== History ==
In May 2017, the Essel Group, an Indian media conglomerate, launched Zee Hindustan as a "nationalist news channel," rebranding their former India 24×7 programming. In December 2018, the channel was relaunched as 'anchorless,' announcing this in a front-page advertisement in the newspaper, Hindustan Times.

In 2018, a former civil servant filed a criminal complaint against Zee Hindustan, after the broadcast of a manipulated video suggesting that some members of the Rashtriya Janata Dal, a political party, shouted 'pro-Pakistan' slogans following their victory in an election in Araria, Bihar. The complaint produced a video to show that no such slogans were raised and that issues in the lip sync in the video aired by Zee Hindustan suggested it was not authentic.

In 2019, an employee of Zee Media, who was head of media content for several channels; including Zee Hindustan, resigned, alleging that the organisation was actively portraying misleading news.

In July 2021, the Popular Front of India, a political party, filed a complaint of defamation against Zee Hindustan, after a news anchor on the show claimed that they had funded efforts by the Rohingya refugees in India to seek identity documents.

In September 2021, Zee Hindustan was one of several Indian channels which ran footage from the video game, Arma 3, while claiming it was real footage of the Pakistani Air Force, bombing parts of Afghanistan. Fact-checking organisations BoomLive and Alt News confirmed that it was video game footage, as did France24, a French news channel.

In April 2020, the Zee Hindustan anchors falsely claimed that a British restaurant was deliberately poisoning non-Muslim customers with food contaminated by faeces, and attempted to link the owners to Tablighi Jamaat, a Muslim organisation, as a recent incident; the visuals and story that they shared related to a 2015 incident in which customers (regardless of religion) fell ill after a rare strain of E. coli, found in the lettuce used in Khyber Pass, a British restaurant, in which the staff had also failed to maintain proper hand-washing protocols - an incident that was widely reported in the British press.

In June 2022, Zee Hindustan was subject to disciplinary action by the News Broadcasting and Digital Standards Authority, along with other news channels, India TV and Aaj Tak, after they posted sensationalist accounts of the arrest of student leader Umar Khalid, and reproduced a police account without verification or fact-checking.

In 2022, Zee Hindustan issued a formal apology and withdrew a news segment, after confirming that it consisted of a doctored video of the Indian National Congress politician, Rahul Gandhi. He had made a public statement forgiving student activists who vandalised his office in Wayanad, Kerala. The video was shared by Zee Hindustan to falsely make it appear that Gandhi was calling for forgiveness for two Muslim persons charged with beheading a Hindu man in a case of communal violence. Following the incident, a criminal complaint was filed against Zee Hindustan and the news anchor who aired the segment, Rohit Ranjan.

The channel was available in several languages: Hindi, Telugu, Tamil, Kannada and Malayalam.
