= MTV Beats =

Indian Hindi-language music channel

- MTV Beats Logo
- Type: Television channel
- Country: India
- Broadcast area: International

Programming
- Language: Hindi
- Picture format: 1080i HDTV

Ownership
- Owner: Viacom18 (branding licensed from Paramount Networks EMEAA)

History
- Launched: 9 October 2016; 9 years ago
- Closed: 15 March 2025; 18 months ago

Links
- Website: www.mtvbeats.in

Availability

Terrestrial
- DD Free Dish: Channel 820

Streaming media
- Jio TV: India
- JioCinema: India

MTV Beats was an Indian pay television channel dedicated to showing Hindi music videos 24×7 with a focus on Bollywood for an audience between the ages of 15 and 30. The channel was owned by Viacom18 under a license agreement with Paramount Networks EMEAA. MTV Beats was discontinued on March 15, 2025.

== History ==
In September 2016, Viacom18 announced MTV Beats as a replacement for the Pepsi MTV Indies channel, with content migrated to the Internet. On 7 September 2016, MTV Beats began broadcasting featuring curated music playlists combined with themed shows and interactive features allowing public voting through the website, SMS and calls. In its second year of broadcasting, it recorded a 50% increase in viewership and the Blood Mein Hai Beat in collaboration with the Indian Red Cross Society. (Beat in our blood) and organized a blood drive using the slogan. The channel used to select an "Artist of the Month" and got exclusive programming in his honor during the month.

The channel ceased broadcasting on March 15, 2025.
