= Nandighosha TV =

24-hour news channel in Odisha, India

- Type: Private
- Industry: News Media
- Founded: 2020
- Headquarters: Bhubaneswar, Odisha, India
- Key people: Manas Ranjan Mangaraj
- Products: Direct broadcast satellite
- Website: www.nandighoshatv.com

Nandighosha TV (ନନ୍ଦିଘୋଷ ଟିଭି) is a 24-hour Odia news channel of the News World Group. This channel was launched on 13 June 2014 by Odisha Chief Minister Naveen Patnaik. Focus TV Group runs a number of other news channels in various languages like Hindi and Bengali.

The channel provides news along with various other programs related to social, economic and education conditions in Odisha. Headquartered in Bhubaneswar, Focus Odisha has nine bureaus located in Cuttack and Puri, each having a journalist, a video journalist and technical staff.

== See also ==
- List of Odia-language television channels
