= Calcutta News (TV channel) =

West Bengali satellite news channel

- Country: India
- Broadcast area: India
- Headquarters: 89, Madhusudan Banerjee Rd, Khalisha Kota, Birati, Kolkata, West Bengal 700051

Programming
- Language: Bengali
- Picture format: 576i SDTV

Ownership
- Owner: Calcutta Television Network Private Limited

History
- Launched: 14 February 2016; 10 years ago
- Founder: Ajit Kumar Das

Links
- Website: calcuttanews.tv

Calcutta News is a 24×7 satellite news channel also a free to air Bengali news channel based in Kolkata, West Bengal owned by AKD Group. It aired on 14 February 2016 by Calcutta Television Network Pvt. Ltd. It serves not only the people of West Bengal but also the Bengali communities throughout the globe.

The vision of the channel is 'Apnar kotha Amader Kontho' (Bengali: আপনার কথা আমাদের কণ্ঠ), which translates to "Your words are our voice". The channel aims to provide news concerning the needs of people from every sector of the Bengali community.

== See also ==
- CTVN AKD PLUS
- CN Rashtriya
- ABP Ananda
- Zee 24 Ghanta
