= Zee Café =

Indian pay television channel for English speakers

Zee
- Country: India
- Broadcast area: Indian subcontinent
- Headquarters: Mumbai

Programming
- Language: Hindi
- Picture format: 1080i HDTV (downscaled to letterboxed 576i for the SDTV feed)

Ownership
- Owner: Zee Entertainment Enterprises
- Sister channels: See list of channels owned by ZEEL

History
- Launched: 15 March 2000; 26 years ago
- Closed: 1 June 2026; 5 months ago
- Replaced by: Unite8 Sports (India)
- Former names: Zee English (2000–2005)

Links
- Website: www.zeecafe.tv

Availability - Available on all major Indian DTH & Cables.

Terrestrial
- DVB-T2 (India): Check local frequencies

Streaming media
- ZEE5: SD & HD
- Jio TV: SD & HD

Zee Cafè (also known as Z Cafè) was an Indian pay television channel owned by Zee Entertainment Enterprises. The channel mainly syndicated popular American and British television shows to appeal to the English-speaking population of India. Since April 1, 2026, the channel has been broadcasting popular sports tournaments (such as ILT20) in Hindi and is set to rebrand under the Zee Sports portfolio. The channel was fully transitioned and replaced with Unite8 Sports 1 (Hindi) on 2 June 2026.

== History ==
Zee Café's logo used from 15 November 2010 to 19 June 2011

Zee Café's logo used from 19 June 2011 to 18 October 2016

Zee Café's logo used from 16 October 2016 to 15 October 2017

Zee English was launched in the Indian subcontinent on 15 March 2000, as competition to Star World. Initially free-to-air, the channel was later encrypted as part of the Zee pay-television bouquet. The launch came when Zee TV started opting for digital signals to provide better signal clarity. It launched alongside Zee Movies; ZEEL had signed agreements with MGM, Pearson, Fremantle, Carlton and Passport International.

The channel underwent a rebranding on 28 March 2005 and was renamed as Zee Café, along with a new logo and promotion deals.

The channel's high-definition feed was launched on 23 September 2015, for a bench test in limited markets and nationwide on 21 November 2015.

The channel ceased its operation as English Entertainment feed alongside its sister channel, &flix, on 31 March 2026. Both of whom were later replaced with Unite8 Sports, serving as Indian home for FIFA World Cup 2026.

== International distribution ==
Zee Café launched on Sky in the United Kingdom and Ireland on 15 July 2010. The channel originally served as the Zee's network hybrid channel, used to broadcast shows from a number of its existing channels in India.

On 11 September 2012, it was repositioned as a classics channel, airing re-runs of old Zee TV and Masala TV programming, covering cookery, dramas, horror and mythology. At the same time the channel became free-to-air.

On 10 June 2013, Zee Café UK was replaced by Lamhé, another free-to-air classics channel from Zee.

== Programming ==
=== Former programming ===
==== Comedy-Drama ====
- A Very English Scandal
- A Million Little Things
- The Carrie Diaries
- The Catch
- Hart of Dixie
- Make It or Break It
- The Mind of the Married Man
- Miss Farah
- The Mysteries of Laura
- No Tomorrow
- Pushing Daisies
- Red Band Society
- Togetherness
- Ugly Betty
- Weeds

==== Drama ====
- Agatha Christie's Poirot
- Agent X
- American Crime
- Army Wives
- The Arrangement
- The Assets
- The Astronaut Wives Club
- Believe
- Beyond
- Body of Proof
- Born to Kill
- Broken
- Central Park West
- Cloak & Dagger
- Code Black
- The Collection
- Criminal Minds
- Criminal Minds: Beyond Borders
- Criminal Minds: Beyond Boundaries
- Charmed
- City on a Hill
- Doctor Foster
- Dexter
- Dynasty
- Evil
- ER
- Eye Candy
- FBI
- Famous in Love
- The First
- Fleming: The Man Who Would Be Bond
- The Following
- The Fosters
- From Darkness
- The Fugitive
- Gilmore Girls
- The Good Fight
- The Good Wife
- Grey's Anatomy
- Gossip Girl
- Gotham
- Guerrilla
- Haven
- Hostages
- House of Cards
- Huge
- Inhumans
- In the Dark
- The Kettering Incident
- Kung Fu
- La Femme Nikita
- Les Misérables
- Lethal Weapon
- Lost
- L.A.'s Finest
- The Loudest Voice
- Maigret
- The Mentalist
- Mistresses
- MotherFatherSon
- Murder in the First
- Magnum P.I.
- McMafia
- Nancy Drew
- New Blood
- The Night Manager
- No Ordinary Family
- The Originals
- The O.C.
- Oz
- Our Girl
- Paula
- Penny Dreadful
- Penny Dreadful: City of Angels
- Perception
- Press
- Pretty Little Liars
- Raising the Bar
- Recovery Road
- Reign
- Renegade
- Resurrection
- Rizzoli & Isles
- Rookie Blue
- Runaways
- Rush Hour
- Riverdale
- SEAL Team
- Scandal
- Secrets and Lies
- The Shannara Chronicles
- She Spies
- The Sinner
- Six Feet Under
- The Son
- The Sopranos
- The Split
- SS-GB
- Still Star-Crossed
- Switched at Birth
- Taboo
- Terminator: TSCC
- Thirteen
- Time After Time
- Top of the Lake
- Training Day
- The Twilight Zone
- Twisted
- Unforgotten
- Valor
- The Vampire Diaries
- War and Peace
- The West Wing
- Wisdom of the Crowd
- Wolf Hall
- The Young Pope

==== Reality/other ====
- America's Funniest Home Videos
- America's Got Talent (moved to Colors Infinity)
- American Idol
- Chef Vs Fridge
- Candid Camera
- Celebrity Family Feud
- Celebrity Name Game
- The Chefs' Line
- The Cut
- The David Letterman Show
- Drop the Mic
- The Ellen DeGeneres Show
- Fameless
- Family Food Fight
- The Gong Show
- Got to Dance
- Just for Laughs Gags
- Keeping Up with the Kardashians
- Live at the Apollo
- Love Island UK
- MasterChef Australia
- Oliver's Twist
- Splatalot!
- Survivor: China
- Top 20 Funniest
- The Tonight Show with Jay Leno
- The Drew Barrymore Show
- The Late Late Show with James Corden
- The Titan Games
- The Toy Box
- Victoria's Secret Fashion Show
- World of Dance
- Wheel of Fortune UK
- The X Factor

==== Science Fiction ====
- The 100
- 11.22.63
- BattleBots
- Class
- Colony (shared with Star World)
- Counterpart
- Journeyman
- Star Trek: Discovery
- The Whispers

==== Superheroes ====
- Supergirl

==== Sitcoms ====
- 2 Broke Girls
- 9JKL
- 18 to Life
- Aliens in America
- American Housewife
- Back to You
- Better with You
- The Benny Hill Show
- The Big Bang Theory (shared with Star World)
- Community
- Caroline in the City
- Carol's Second Act
- Cougar Town
- Everybody Loves Raymond
- Friends
- Full House
- The Great Indoors
- Ground Floor
- Happy Endings
- Happy Together
- Here's Lucy
- The Hogan Family
- I Dream of Jeannie
- Joey
- Just Shoot Me!
- The King of Queens
- Kevin from Work
- Mad About You
- Malibu Country
- Melissa & Joey
- The Middle
- Mike & Molly
- The Millers
- The Unicorn
- Mind Your Language
- Mixology
- My Wife and Kids
- The Odd Couple
- Parks and Recreation
- Our Cartoon President
- The Real O'Neals
- Rules of Engagement
- Seinfeld
- Selfie
- Three's Company
- Trial & Error
- Two and a Half Men
- Unhitched
- Will & Grace
- Young and Hungry

==== Anime ====
- Blood+
- Death Note
- Guin Saga
- Kabutoborg
- Kurozuka
- Marvel Anime Blade
- Marvel Anime Iron Man
- Marvel Anime Wolverine
- Ultraviolet: Code 044
- Viper's Creed
- Valkyria Chronicles

==== Documentary ====
- Mayday
- Zero Hour

== See also ==
- List of Indian television stations
- Zee Network
