= Star Kiran =

Indian Odia language TV channel

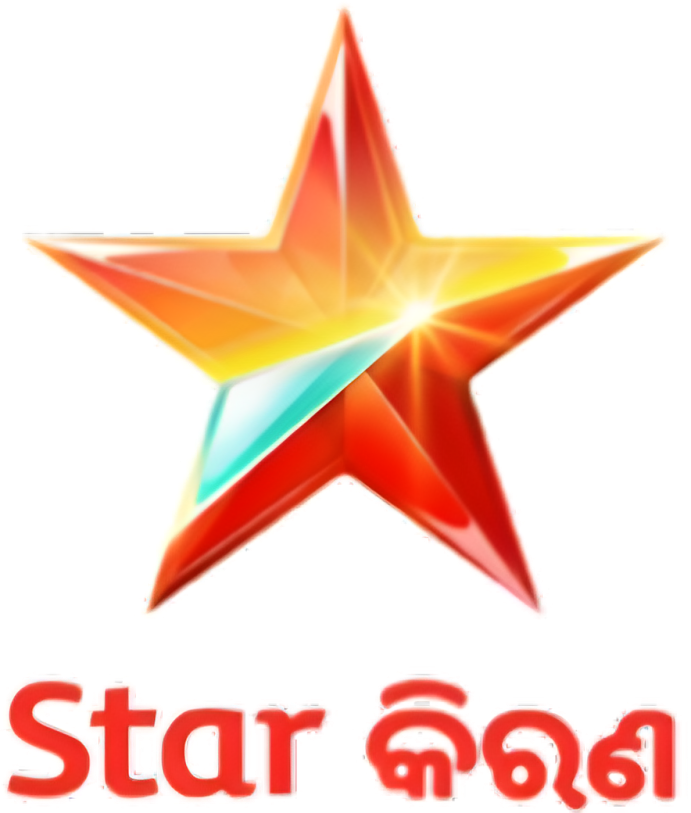
- Logo used since 2022
- Country: India
- Broadcast area: India
- Headquarters: Bhubaneswar, Odisha, India

Programming
- Language: Odia
- Picture format: (576p for SDTV feed) SD feed available only

Ownership
- Owner: JioStar
- Sister channels: JioStar Channels

History
- Launched: 6 June 2022; 4 years ago

Links
- Website: Star Kiran on JioHotstar

Star Kiran is an Indian Odia language general entertainment pay television channel owned by JioStar, a joint venture between Viacom18 and Disney India. the channel was launched on 6 June 2022. It primarily broadcasts family dramas, comedies, reality shows and films. Star Kiran HD is the first Odia High-definition (HD) television channel. The HD feed of the channel closed on March 15, 2025.

== Etymology ==
The word Kiran (କିରଣ) means ray of light in Odia language. The slogan of Star Kiran is Eithu Arambha, Eithi Sambhaba, which means "Starts from here, Possible here" in Odia language.

== Functions ==
The channel has a variety of shows as well as movies. It also made a Raja Festival Special program with Ollywood celebrities known as "Banaste Daakila Gaja". The channel also organised a special event for Independence day 2022 as "Ude Triranga" and Dussehra Show with Star Kiran Serial casts known as "Aama Ghara Dussehra".
