= Sambad =

Indian newspaper of Odia language

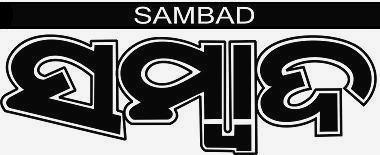
- Type: Daily
- Format: Print, online
- Owner: Soumya Ranjan Patnaik
- Founder: Soumya Ranjan Patnaik
- Publisher: Kamala Kanta Mohapatra
- Editor-in-chief: Tanaya Patnaik
- Founded: October 4, 1984
- Language: Odia
- Headquarters: Bhubaneswar
- Circulation: 4 lakh (approx.)
- Website: sambad.in sambadenglish.com

Sambad is an Indian newspaper of Odia language published daily from Bhubaneswar, Odisha. It is part of the Sambad Group media conglomerate, which also operates TV, radio, and digital platforms. It is one of the largest circulated Odia newspapers in the state. It is published from the capital city of Bhubaneswar, as well as from Cuttack, Brahmapur, Rourkela, Sambalpur, Baleswar, Jajpur, Jeypore, and Angul.

The first edition was published on October 4, 1984, in Bhubaneswar.

== Readership and circulation ==
According to the newspaper, it has a daily circulation of more than 4 lakh copies and a readership of nearly 70 lakh across Odisha.

== Supplements ==
Sambad publishes several supplements and special sections, including:

- Suprabhat – morning news roundup
- E2 – education and employment
- Mahanagar – city news
- Rabibar – Sunday magazine
- Katha – literature and stories
- Paurusha – health and wellness

== Ownership and editorial leadership ==
The founder of Sambad is Soumya Ranjan Patnaik, a media entrepreneur and politician. He served as editor from the paper’s inception in 1984 until 2023, when he stepped down. His daughter Tanaya Patnaik was appointed as the new editor.

According to the official Sambad Group management page, the group’s leadership includes:

Name	Position	Responsibilities
Soumya Ranjan Patnaik	Chairman	Overseeing the 360-degree media house encompassing print, radio, TV, digital, and CSR initiatives.
Dr. Monica Nayyar Patnaik	Managing Director	Responsible for operations of Sambad Group, including flagship print daily, TV channel, radio station, and digital platforms.
Tanaya Patnaik	Editor of Sambad and Kanak News	Leading print, radio, TV, and digital content strategy and initiatives.

== Controversies ==
In 2023, the Economic Offences Wing (EOW) of Odisha Police alleged that the Sambad group was involved in a loan fraud of around ₹50 crore, using forged salary certificates to secure loans. The EOW raided the newspaper’s offices in Bhubaneswar and other places.

Soumya Ranjan Patnaik’s dual role as a politician and media owner has also drawn attention. In 2023, he was removed from a party post in the Biju Janata Dal after writing editorials in Sambad critical of party leaders.

== See also ==
- List of newspapers in India
