= Prarthana Life =

Prarthana TV
- Country: India
- Broadcast area: All Over India
- Headquarters: Bhubaneswar, Odisha, India

Programming
- Language(s): Odia
- Picture format: 4:3 1080p SDTV

History
- Launched: 14 April 2010; 15 years ago

Prarthana Life is a 24-hour Odia language spiritual TV channel. It was founded on 14 April 2010. It covers religious programs, religious discussions and devotional songs.

== See also ==
- List of Odia-language television channels
- List of longest-running Indian television series
