= Odisha TV =

Odia language news channel

OTV (Odisha Television Limited)
- Company type: Private
- Founded: 14 April 1997; 29 years ago
- Headquarters: Bhubaneswar, Odisha, India
- Products: Direct Broadcast Satellite
- Owner: Jagi Mangat Panda
- Website: odishatv.in

Odisha TV or OTV is an Odia Indian Cable Television station. It is owned by the Bhubaneswar-based Odisha Television Network. It was started and promoted by Jagi Mangat Panda. Odisha Television (OTV) is the first private Electronic Media in the state of Odisha.

Launched in 1997 in the twin cities of Bhubaneswar and Cuttack, the channel slowly spread to all major towns of the state. It was converted from cable to a satellite channel in December 2006.

== List of programmes ==
Most programmes of OTV are news based. It also has programmes related to art and culture, tourism, business, food and festivals. Some of its programmes include the following.

- Good Morning Odisha
- Roga Pain Yoga
- Sakalara Khabara
- Sarbe Bhabantu Sukhinaha
- Bhagyarekha Live
- Mid-Day Roundup
- Business Odisha
- Feedin
- Good Evening Odisha
- Prime Time Takkar
- Sahara Prime
- Pratidin
- Gaan ru Pratidin
- News @ 9
- News @11
- Aagyan Mind Kale Ki
- Atma Pretatma Paramatma
- Gapa Saap
- The Great Odisha Political Circus
- Jibana Do Chakire Ashara Alok
- Janamancha
- E-News-Pupul Bhuyan (presenter)
- Jatra Ra Jatra
- Making News
- Khola Katha
- News Fuse
- Jojana Ra Na Hariloot
- Taste Of Odisha
- Police File
- Story of Odisha
- Aparadha Diary
- Akuha Katha
- Aapana Eka Nuhanti
- Doctor Doctor
- Bastu Bichara

== Elant rescue incident ==
On 24 September 2021, an Odisha TV journalist died while another was critically injured when the boat they were travelling to cover the elephant rescue overturned due to the river current. An ODRAF personnel also died in the incident. The elephant rescue operation was put on hold after the boat overturned. The elephant was eventually found dead after he unable to cross the river.

== Channels provided ==
Channel	Logo	Category	Launch	Quality	Note(s)
OTV		News	1997	SD	
Tarang TV		General Entertainment	2008	SD+HD	
Tarang Music		Music	2009	SD	
Prarthana Life		Spiritual	2010	SD	Formerly Prarthana TV
Alankar TV		Movies	2015	SD	

== See also ==
- List of Odia-language television channels
- List of longest-running Indian television series
- List of television stations in India
