= Colors Cineplex =

Hindi movie channel

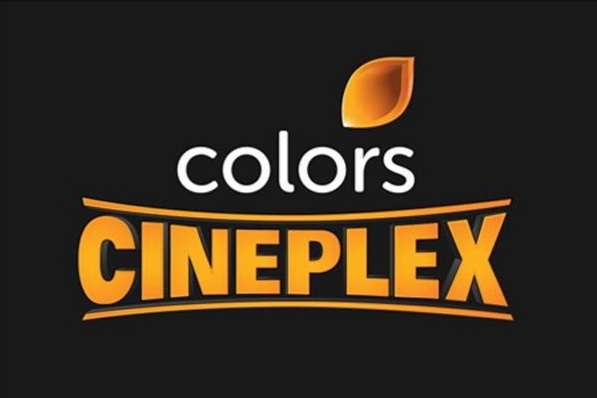
- Logo used since 2019
- Type: Television Channel
- Country: India
- Broadcast area: Worldwide
- Network: JioStar

Programming
- Picture format: 1080p HDTV

Ownership
- Owner: JioStar
- Key people: Rockteem Bhattacharjee
- Sister channels: Colors Cineplex Superhits; Colors Cineplex Bollywood

History
- Launched: 8 May 2016; 10 years ago (India); 29 September 2016; 10 years ago in (UK); 5 October 2016; 10 years ago in (USA)
- Replaced: Rishtey Cineplex
- Former names: Rishtey Cineplex (2016-2019)

Links
- Website: colorscineplex.com

Availability

Streaming media
- JioHotstar: India

Colors Cineplex is a group of Indian Hindi-language 24/7 movie channels, owned and operated by JioStar, a joint venture between Viacom18 and Disney India. The flagship channel, also named Colors Cineplex, primarily broadcasts Bollywood films, catering to a broad audience with a mix of contemporary hits, classic cinema and Sports events. It was launched on 8 May 2016 as Rishtey Cineplex.

== History ==
In June 2016 Viacom18 decided to launch the channel in the UK as Rishtey Cineplex. It launched on 29 September 2016 on Sky, replacing UMP Movies. The channel also launched in US on 5 October 2016 on Dish Network.

The channel was launched on Freeview on 17 January 2017. However, it was later removed on 1 July 2017.

In 2017, Viacom18 launched HD movie channel Cineplex HD and it was rebranded as Colors Cineplex HD in 2019.

In October 2017, the channel was launched in Virgin Media.

On 1 March 2019, Rishtey Cineplex was rebranded as Colors Cineplex and Cineplex HD as Colors Cineplex HD.

Viacom18 relaunched Rishtey Cineplex on 5 June 2020 on DD Free Dish. Viacom18 launched another Hindi movie channel Colors Cineplex Bollywood on 1 April 2021. The channel broadcasts Bollywood and the Hindi dubbed South Indian movies.

== Channels ==
=== Colors Cineplex Superhits ===
Colors Cineplex Superhits is a Hindi language free-to-air movie channel in India, owned by JioStar, a Joint Venture between Viacom18 & Disney India It was launched on 1 April 2022. It replaced the movie channel Rishtey Cineplex.

Earlier, the channel broadcast both Bollywood and South Indian movies dubbed in Hindi. After the launch of Colors Cineplex Bollywood on 1 April 2021, the channel broadcast only South Indian Hindi-dubbed movies while the latter is a dedicated Bollywood movies channel.

=== Colors Cineplex Bollywood ===
Colors Cineplex Bollywood is a Hindi language free-to-air movie channel in India, owned by JioStar, a Joint Venture between Viacom18 & Disney India The channel primarily focuses only on Bollywood movies and it became the third movie channel after Colors Cineplex and Colors Cineplex Superhits from the same parent company.

== Original shows ==
- Road Safety World Series is a T20 cricket competition organised by the Road Safety Cell of Maharashtra to raise awareness about road safety. In the Road safety world series, Cricket world Legends will match against each other for a noble cause. It will be a series of 11 matches that will be played in the T20 format. The series features some big names in cricket from India, Australia, Sri Lanka, West Indies and South Africa like Sachin Tendulkar, Virender Sehwag, Yuvraj Singh, Zaheer Khan, Brian Lara, Shivnarine Chanderpaul, etc. and Former India captain Sunil Gavaskar is the commissioner of the series. The series was aired from 7 to 22 March 2020 on Colors Cineplex. Ravi Gaikwad, Chief of RTO, Thane (Konkan Range), Government of Maharashtra, is the founder of the Road Safety World Series, who integrated concept of Road Safety with sports to save lives on Indian roads and across the globe.

The man who has been supporting for the cause of road safety is Ravi Gaikwad, Senior Member of Road Safety Cell, Government of Maharashtra.

Ravi Gaikwad, Chairman of Shant Bharat Surakshit Bharat appreciated Yohan Blake's visit to India and his efforts for road safety campaign, which required the need to educate the people and make them aware of their responsibilities so as to save as many lives as possible on Indian roads.

- T10 League – Abu Dhabi T10 League season 5 was broadcast on the channel along with Rishtey Cineplex and Voot.
