= News18 Bangla =

Bengali news channel

- Logo used since 2018
- Country: India
- Broadcast area: West Bengal
- Headquarters: Kolkata, West Bengal, India

Programming
- Language: Bengali
- Picture format: 576i SDTV

Ownership
- Owner: Network18 Group
- Sister channels: Network18 Group channels

History
- Launched: 10 March 2014; 12 years ago
- Replaced: ETV News Bangla

Links
- Webcast: Watch Live
- Website: bengali.news18.com

News18 Bangla is an Indian Bengali-language free-to-air 24-hour news television channel owned by the Network18 Group. It was originally launched as ETV News Bangla on 10 March 2014, and was rebranded as News18 Bangla on 12 March 2018.
