= Lists of television channels in India =

There are currently 918 permitted private satellite television channels in India as of March 2025. Out of these 908 are available for downlinking in India. The remaining channels are either uplink-only or serve other geographies. Numerous regional channels are available throughout India, often distributed according to languages.

== Lists ==
=== By video technology ===
- HD

=== By language ===
- Assamese
- Bangla
- Bhojpuri
- English
- Gujarati
- Hindi
- Kannada
- Konkani
- Malayalam
- Marathi
- Meitei
- Odia
- Punjabi
- Tamil
- Telugu

=== By category ===
- News

== See also ==
- Lists of global television channels
- Lists of global television networks
