= Zee Media Corporation =

Private Indian news broadcasting company, headquartered in Mumbai

Zee Media Corporation Limited
- Formerly: Zee Sports Limited (1999-2004); Zee News Limited (2004–2013)
- Type: Public
- Traded as: BSE: 532794; NSE: ZEEMEDIA
- ISIN: INE966H01019
- Industry: Mass Media
- Founded: August 27, 1999; 27 years ago
- Headquarters: Mumbai, Maharashtra, India
- Key people: Jawahar Goel (editor-in-chief)
- Brands: Zee News; Daily News and Analysis; Grazia India; TopGear India
- Revenue: ₹640 crore (US$68 million) (2020)
- Net income: ₹−273 crore (US$−29 million) (2020)
- Owner: Essel Group
- Number of employees: 1,719 (2020)
- Website: zeemedia.in

Zee Media Corporation Limited (abbreviated as ZMCL; formerly Zee News Limited) is an Indian mass media and news broadcasting company based in Mumbai. The company is engaged mainly in the business of broadcasting news and current affairs, and regional entertainment up-linked from India via satellite television channels.

== History ==
Zee Media Corporation Limited (formerly Zee News Ltd.) was founded by Essel Group and it was incorporated on 27 August 1999, as Zee Sports Ltd. It was a subsidiary of Zee Telefilms Ltd (later renamed Zee Entertainment Enterprises). The company was reincorporated on 27 May 2004, as Zee News Ltd. It was demerged as a separate company of the Essel Group in 2006. In 2013, Zee News Ltd. changed its name to Zee Media Corporation Limited.

It was involved in a joint venture with the Dainik Bhaskar Group for the publication of the Daily News & Analysis newspaper but the paper was discontinued in 2019 after suffering losses. The corporation also runs the Zee Institute of Media Arts (ZIMA) which is owned by Zee Learn.

== Channels ==
Zee Media Corporation Limited (ZMCL) operates 14 television news channels, 5 digital news channels, 7 news apps and 32 digital properties.

=== Current channels ===
Channels	Launched	Language	Category	SD/HD Availability	Notes
Zee News	1999	Hindi	News	SD+HD	Launched as EL TV in 1993, it was rebranded as a television news program on Zee TV and in 1995, as a separate news channel.
Zee Business	2002	Hindi	News	SD	Initially launched as a television business news program on Zee News, it was launched as a separate business news channel in 2004.
Zee Bharat	2023	Hindi	News	SD	Launched as Zee News Uttar Pradesh/Uttarakhand in 2007 and rebranded as Zee Sangam in 2014, in 2016 as India 24×7, and in 2017 as Zee Hindustan.
Zee Rajasthan	2013	Hindi	News	SD	Launched as Zee Rajasthan Plus Marudhara in 2013 and rebranded as Zee Marudhara in 2014 and 2016 as Zee Rajasthan News.
Zee Madhya Pradesh Chhattisgarh	2008	Hindi	News	SD	Launched as Zee 24 Ghante Chhattisgarh in 2008 and as Zee 24 Ghante Madhya Pradesh Chhattisgarh in 2013.
Zee Uttar Pradesh Uttarakhand	2007	Hindi	News	SD	Launched as Zee News Uttarakhand Uttar Pradesh (2007-2013) and Zee Uttar Pradesh Uttarakhand (2013-2014) rebranded as Zee Sangam in 2014 and 2016 as India 24×7. The channel was relaunched in 2017.
Zee Punjab Haryana Himachal	1999	Hindi	News	SD	Launched in 1999 as Alpha TV Punjabi, it was rebranded in 2005 as Zee Punjabi. Again rebranded as Zee Punjab Haryana Himachal in 2013.
Zee Bihar Jharkhand	2009	Hindi	News	SD	Maurya TV was rebranded as Zee Purvaiya in 2014, after being acquired. In May 2017, it was again rebranded as Zee Bihar Jharkhand.
Zee Delhi NCR Haryana	2022	Hindi	News	SD	
Zee J&K Ladakh	2025	Urdu	News	SD	On April, 2025, channel has been launched as Kesar TV J&K Ladakh, later rebranded as Zee J&K Ladakh.
Salaam TV	2010	Urdu	News	SD	Originally launched on 2010 as Zee Salaam, later rebranded as Salaam TV in December, 2024.
WION	2016	English	News	SD	
Zee 24 Ghanta	2006	Bengali	News	SD	Launched as 24 Ghanta in 2006 and rebranded as Zee 24 Ghanta in 2017.
Zee 24 Taas	1999	Marathi	News	SD	Launched as a programme in the name of Alpha TV Batmya on Alpha TV Marathi from 1999 to 2005. Renamed as Zee News Marathi and in 2007 as a separate news channel, known as Zee 24 Taas.
Zee 24 Kalak	1999	Gujarati	News	SD	Launched as a programme in the name of Alpha TV Samachar from 1999 to 2005 on Alpha TV Gujarati. Renamed as Zee Gujarati Samachar in 2005 and launched as a separate news channel in January 2017.
Zee Kannada News	2023	Kannada	News	SD	Launched as a Digital channel in 2022 and as a TV channel in April 2023.
Zee Telugu News	2023	Telugu			

=== Former and defunct channels ===
Channels	Launched	Defunct	Language	Category	SD/HD availability	Notes
Zee 24 Gantalu	2008	2015	Telugu	News	SD	
Zee Odisha	2014	2022	Odia	News	SD	Launched as Zee Kalinga in 2014 and as Zee Kalinga News. Rebranded as Zee Odisha in 2018. Rebranded as Zee Odisha News in 2022". Digitally available now.
Zee Salaam	2010	2024	Urdu	News	SD	Replaced by Zee J&K Ladakh

=== Online ===
Zee News operates the Daily News & Analysis and Zee News websites to provide online coverage of the channel. The ZEE5 website which is owned by the Zee Entertainment Enterprises is used to platform coverage of other ZMCL channels. The World is One News (WION) channel operates its website. The ZMCL also owns the India.com news website.

- Daily News & Analysis Website: English-language online news coverage service. It is branded under the DNA program of Zee News.

=== Newspaper ===
The Daily News & Analysis was an English-language broadsheet newspaper owned by the Zee Media Corporation Limited. It was launched on 30 July 2005 and branded under the Daily News & Analysis (DNA) program of Zee News. It was primarily circulated in Mumbai and discontinued on 9 October 2019 citing recurring losses.

== Controversies and criticism ==
=== Jindal Group extortion incident ===
The channel was tried for allegedly extorting ₹1 billion from the Jindal Group revealed through a sting operation. Two senior journalists Sudhir Chaudhary and Sameer Ahluwalia were arrested. The two were sent to a 14-day judicial custody in Tihar jail and were ultimately released on bail. Naveen Jindal had accused the two journalists of trying to extort ₹1,000,000,000 (equivalent to ₹2.2 billion or US$24 million in 2026) in advertisements for Zee News from him through blackmail by threatening to air stories against his company in the Coalgate scam. Zee News denied the charges and made counterclaims of Jindal offering them ₹200,000,000 (equivalent to ₹450 million or US$4.8 million in 2026) to halt their investigations against Jindal Steel's involvement in the scam but filed no charges. In July 2018, the Jindal Group withdrew the case against Zee News and both parties to the litigation stated that an out of court settlement had been reached which remains undisclosed.

=== Cases of fabrication ===
==== Jawaharlal Nehru University sedition controversy ====
Zee News reported that students from the Democratic Students' Union (DSU) raised "anti-India" slogans such as Bharat ki barbadi (The destruction of India) and Pakistan Zindabad (Long live Pakistan) at an event in the Jawaharlal Nehru University campus. In a letter, Vishwa Deepak, a journalist working at the channel, stated that "our biases made us hear Bhartiya Court Zindabad (Long live the Indian courts) as Pakistan Zindabad. Vishwa Deepak later resigned from the channel after expressing reservations over its "biased coverage". The footage on the newscast of Zee News had formed the basis of charges filed by the Delhi Police. Sudhir Chaudhary, the editor and prime time anchor of the channel, however on a telecast, made a statement saying "our channel only showed what was happening there, whatever we have shown is 100% authentic." A forensic report of the Delhi Police however later stated that the footage was doctored.

==== GPS Chips in ₹2000 currency notes ====
Anchor Sudhir Chaudhary ran a Daily News and Analysis program announcing that the Indian 2000-rupee note issued after the 2016 Indian banknote demonetisation by the government have GPS chips which will allow it to track currency, thereby reducing corruption. The Minister of Finance, Arun Jaitley dismissed the report as being rumours. The Reserve Bank of India has also stated that no such chips are present in the currency notes. The presence of "nano-GPS" in the currency notes has been classified as a hoax being spread on social media.

==== Navjot Singh Sidhu – Alwar controversy ====
Zee News telecasted a video with the claim that the slogans of Pakistan Zindabad were raised at a rally in Alwar presided over by the Indian National Congress politician, Navjot Singh Sidhu. Sidhu accused Zee News of playing a doctored video and threatened to file a defamation suit against Zee News. Sidhu stated that slogans of Jo Bole So Nihal were misconstrued as being in favour of Pakistan. Zee News accused Sidhu of calling a news broadcast to be fake news and sent a defamation notice to him. The notice demanded an apology from him within 24 hours and threatened to pursue legal recourse if an apology was not issued by him.

==== Mahua Moitra criminal defamation case ====
Zee News telecasted a show featuring editor-in-chief Sudhir Chaudhary where he claimed that the Trinamool Congress legislator Mahua Moitra had plagiarised author Martin Longman in her maiden speech after being elected to the Lok Sabha. Moitra accused the channel of false reporting and submitted a breach of privilege motion against Zee News and Sudhir Chaudhary. Martin Longman responded and stated that the legislator did not plagiarise him. Subsequently, Moitra filed a criminal defamation case against Chaudhary.

=== Coverage of 2020 Delhi election results ===
The 2020 Delhi Legislative Assembly election was held on 8 February 2020. The exit poll results predicted the Aam Aadmi Party to retain their government in National capital territory of Delhi. The Zee News telecast of the exit poll results featured Sudhir Chaudhary, who indulged in polemic commentary against the voters of the election. He stated that the people of Delhi had chosen Pakistan over Hindustan and that the rule of Mughals will now return. He further alleged the people of Delhi are lazy and only concerned about "freebies" and that issues like Ram Mandir, Balakot airstrike and Revocation of Article 370 do not matter to them which is why they have rejected the Bharatiya Janata Party. The telecast resulted in backlash and mockery of Zee News and Sudhir Chaudhary on social media.

=== Ban in Nepal ===
On 9 July 2020, Nepal's satellite and cable television operators banned Zee News and some other Indian privately owned news channels, citing "propaganda and defamatory report against the Nepali government".

=== Alleged interference in Canadian issues ===
Zee Media's and its subsidiary WION were cited in a September 2024 report from RRM Canada on "Potential Foreign Information Manipulation, and Interference following PM Statement on Killing of Hardeep Singh Nijjar". The report examined content from popular Indian State-aligned media outlets and influencers, including WION, finding that "Modi-aligned outlets amplified several state-supported narratives about Prime Minister Trudeau, "Canada's High Commissioner to India, Canada's national security agencies, Canada's Punjabi Sikh diaspora, and Hardeep Singh Nijjar's political beliefs." The report highlighted the “massive digital footprint” of some of the named media outlets in comparison to Canadian media outlets, estimating Zee Media's total audience is 68 Million people.

== See also ==
- Zee Entertainment Enterprises
- Zee News
