= Karunanidhi family =

Indian political family in Tamil Nadu

- Current region: Chennai, Tamil Nadu, India
- Members: M. Karunanidhi; Padmavathi Ammal; Dayalu Ammal; Rajathi Ammal; M. K. Muthu; M. K. Alagiri; M. K. Tamilarasu; M. K. Stalin; M.K. Selvi; Kanimozhi Rajathi Karunanidhi; Durga Stalin; Murasoli Maran; Murasoli Selvam; Kalanidhi Maran; Dayanidhi Maran; Udhayanidhi Stalin; Dayanidhi Azhagiri; Arulnidhi Tamilarasu; Kaviya Maran; Kiruthiga Udhayanidhi; Sabareesan Vedamurthy
- Estate: Gopalapuram, Chennai

The Karunanidhi family is an Indian family that has had considerable influence on the politics and cinema of the South Indian state of Tamil Nadu. The most well-known member of the family was M. Karunanidhi, who served as the Chief Minister of Tamil Nadu for five terms and was the leader of the Dravida Munnetra Kazhagam (DMK), a prominent political party in the state, from 1969 to 2018. The family traces its roots to Thiruvarur in Central Tamil Nadu, and later settled in the state capital of Chennai.

Karunanidhi married thrice, and had four sons and two daughters. His eldest son M. K. Muthu was an actor in the Tamil film industry. His second son M. K. Alagiri served as a union minister in the Second Manmohan Singh ministry from 2009 to 2013. His third son, M. K. Stalin, served as chief minister of Tamil Nadu from 2021 to 2026. His youngest daughter, Kanimozhi, is a Member of Parliament in the Lok Sabha. His grandsons include Udhayanidhi Stalin, Dayanidhi Azhagiri, and Arulnidhi Tamilarasu, who are all involved in Tamil cinema. Udhayanidhi also served as the deputy chief minister of the state.

His extend family includes Murasoli Maran, who was born to Shanmugasundari, the elder sister of Karunanidhi. Maran served as a member of the Parliament for 36 years, and held various ministerial positions during his tenure. His younger brother, Murasoli Selvam, was a journalist, and married Karunanidhi's elder daughter Selvi. Maran's sons include, Kalanidhi Maran, the founder of the media conglomerate Sun Group, and Dayanidhi Maran, who is a member of parliament and has previously served as a cabinet minister.

The significant presence of Karunanidhi's family members in the central and state governments has led to accusations of political nepotism. Two members of the family, Kanimozhi and Dayanidhi Maran, were charged by the Central Bureau of Investigation, for their alleged involvement in the 2G spectrum case, from which they were later acquitted by the Delhi High Court. The later generations of the family has faced criticism for allegedly using political influence to gain advantages in the Tamil film industry.

== M. Karunanidhi ==
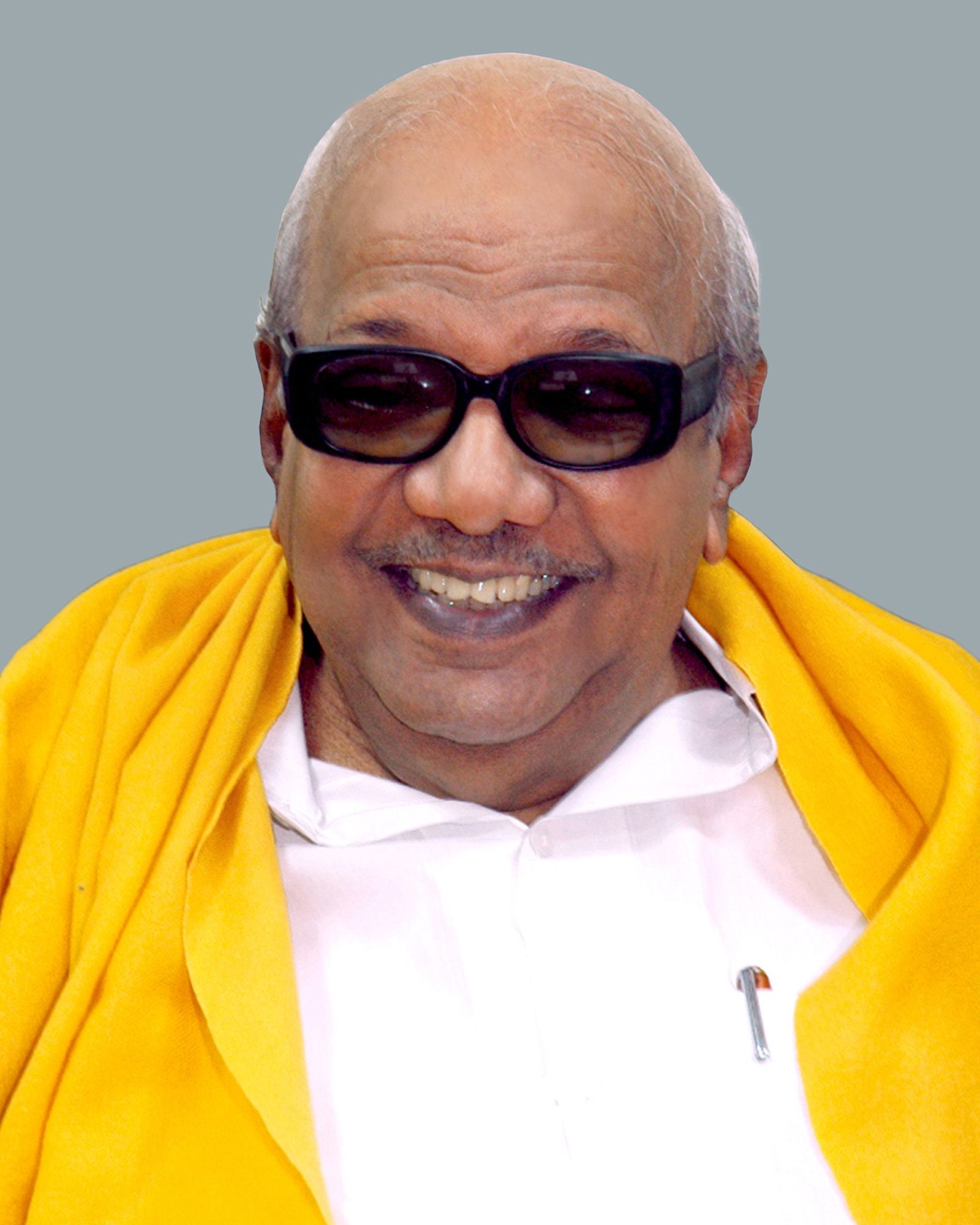
File picture of Karunanidhi

Muthuvel Karunanidhi (3 June 1924 - 7 August 2018) was the head of Dravida Munnetra Kazhagam (DMK), a Dravidian political party in the state of Tamil Nadu. He has been the leader of the DMK since the death of its founder, C. N. Annadurai, in 1969, though the party had leading stalwarts in Nedunchezhian, E. V. K. Sampath, K. A. Mathiazhagan, Nanjil K. Manoharan and K. Anbazhagan, who were called Aim perum Thalaivargal meaning five great leaders. He has served as chief minister five times (1969–71, 1971–76, 1989–91, 1996–2001 and 2006–2011). He holds the record of winning his seat in every election in which he has participated in a political career spanning more than 60 years. He is also a playwriter and screenwriter in Tamil cinema.

Karunanidhi married thrice, to Padmavathi, Dayalu Ammal, and Rajathi Ammal, and had four sons and two daughters. His eldest son M. K. Muthu was an actor in the Tamil film industry. His second son M. K. Alagiri served as a union minister in the Second Manmohan Singh ministry from 2009 to 2013. His youngest son, M. K. Stalin, served as chief minister of Tamil Nadu from 2021 to 2026. His youngest daughter, Kanimozhi, is a Member of Parliament in the Lok Sabha. His grandsons include Udhayanidhi Stalin, Dayanidhi Azhagiri, and Arulnidhi Tamilarasu, who are all involved in Tamil cinema. Udhayanidhi Stalin currently serves as the Leader of the Opposition in the Tamil Nadu Legislative Assembly, having previously served as the deputy chief minister of the state from 2024 to 2026.

His extended family includes Murasoli Maran, who was born to Shanmugasundari, the elder sister of Karunanidhi. Maran served as a member of the Parliament for 36 years, and held various ministerial positions during his tenure. His younger brother, Murasoli Selvam, was a journalist, and married Karunanidhi's elder daughter Selvi. Maran's sons include Kalanidhi Maran, the founder of the media conglomerate Sun Group, and Dayanidhi Maran, who is a member of parliament and has previously served as a cabinet minister.

The significant presence of Karunanidhi's family members in the central and state governments has led to accusations of political nepotism. Two members of the family, Kanimozhi and Dayanidhi Maran, were charged by the Central Bureau of Investigation for their alleged involvement in the 2G spectrum case, from which they were later acquitted by the Delhi High Court. The later generations of the family have faced criticism for allegedly using political influence to gain advantages in the Tamil film industry.

== Family tree ==
- Muthuvel m. Anjugam
  - Shanmugasundari
    - Murasoli Maran (1934–2003)murasaki amirtham
      - Kalanithi Maran (b. 1965)
        - Kaviya Maran (b. 1992) m. Anirudh Ravichander
      - Dayanidhi Maran (b. 1966)
    - Murasoli Selvam (d. 2024) m. Selvi
  - M. Karunanidhi (1924–2018)
    - m. Padmavathi (d. 1948)
      - M. K. Muthu (b. 1948)
        - Thenmozhi
          - Dharaneeshwari m. Aakash Baskaran
    - m. Dayalu Ammal (b. 1933)
      - M. K. Alagiri (b. 1951)
        - Dayanidhi Azhagiri
      - M. K. Stalin (b. 1953) m. Durga Stalin
        - Udhayanidhi Stalin (b. 1977) m. Kiruthiga Udhayanidhi
          - Inbanidhi
        - Senthamarai Stalin m. Sabareesan Vedamurthy
      - Selvi m. Murasoli Selvam (d. 2024)
      - M. K. Tamilarasu
        - Arulnidhi Tamilarasu (b. 1987)
    - m. Rajathi Ammal (b. 1945)
      - Kanimozhi (b. 1968)

== Murasoli Maran ==
Murasoli Maran (Tamil: முரசொலி மாறன்) (17 August 1934 – 23 November 2003) was an important leader of the Dravida Munnetra Kazhagam (DMK) party and the nephew of M. Karunanidhi. A Member of Parliament for 36 years, he was made a Union Minister in three separate central governments, in charge of Urban Development in the V.P. Singh government, Industry in the Gowda and Gujral governments, and finally Commerce and Industry under Vajpayee. Apart from being a politician, Maran was a journalist and scriptwriter for films too. He was the editor of the DMK party paper, Murasoli and hence got the title appended to his name.

== Controversy ==
=== Allegations of nepotism ===
DMK has been accused by opponents, by some members of the party, and by other political observers of trying to promote nepotism and start a political dynasty along the lines of the Nehru-Gandhi family. Vaiko, who quit the DMK, has been the most vocal. Political observers say that Vaiko was sidelined as he was seen as a threat to M. K. Stalin and other family members.

Karunanidhi's nephew, the late Murasoli Maran, was a Union Minister; however, it has been pointed out that he was in politics long before Karunanidhi became the Chief Minister in 1969. He was arrested several times, including in the Anti-Hindi agitations in 1965. He was asked to contest the by-election for South Madras in 1967 and the nomination papers were signed by Rajaji, Annadurai and Mohammed Ismail (Quaid-e-Millath), demonstrating that his political career was not built entirely on his relation to Karunanidhi.

Many political opponents and DMK party senior leaders have been critical of the rise of M. K. Stalin in the party. But some of the party men have pointed out that Stalin has come up on his own. He has faced a lot of hardship since 1975, when he was jailed under the Maintenance of Internal Security Act (MISA) and was beaten up in jail so brutally during the Emergency that a fellow DMK party prisoner died trying to save him. Stalin was an MLA in 1989 and 1996 when his father Karunanidhi was the Chief Minister, but he was not inducted into the Cabinet. He became Chennai's 44th mayor and its first directly elected mayor in 1996. It was only in his fourth term as MLA that he was made a Minister in the Karunanidhi cabinet and then in 2009 was made the Deputy Chief Minister.

Karunanidhi has been accused of helping Murasoli Maran's son Kalanidhi Maran, who runs Sun Network, India's second largest television network. According to Forbes, Kalanidhi is among India's richest 20, with $2.9 billion. Again commentators say that he raised himself into the position on his own merit and even Karunanidhi's sons have achieved nothing compared to him which has been a cause of friction between them. His channels have been the mouth organ of the DMK party (until recent time) and balanced the Jaya TV of the AIADMK.

Another son of Maran's, Dayanidhi Maran, is a former Union Minister for Communications and IT portfolio, not broadcasting ministry, which is responsible for TV networks. Dayanidhi Maran was withdrawn from the IT and Communications portfolio at Center (he was a Union Minister for IT and Communications) because Dinakaran survey poll controversy. He was later given the MP seat in the 2009 general elections from DMK party and subsequently became the Minister of Textiles in the union government.

The Dinakaran newspaper case was handed over to the CBI. But the District and Sessions court acquitted all the 17 accused in that case. So far, the case has not been appealed in a higher court to identify and punish the perpetrators of the crime.

Karunanidhi's daughter Kanimozhi is a member of parliament in Lok Sabha.

=== Marans vs Azhagiri ===
In 2006 May, Dinakaran, the newspaper run by Kalanidhi Maran ran into a controversy when it published the results of a series of opinion polls which showed M. K. Stalin having more approval (70%) than his elder brother M. K. Azhagiri (2%) as the political heir of Karunanidhi. It also showed others as 20%, possibly indicating Dayanidhi Maran and Kanimozhi. The Madurai office of Dinakaran was fire bombed by supporters of Alagiri and three employees were killed The Sun TV office in Madurai was also attacked by the perpetrators. A day after the incident, Prime Minister Manmohan Singh and Sonia Gandhi came to Chennai for felicitating Karunanidhi for 50 years in legislative assembly. Dayanidhi Maran, who usually accompanies Karunanidhi on every function, discarded the event as a mark of protest. On 13 May, the DMK administrative committee empowered Karunanidhi to remove Dayanidhi from the party. This subsequently led to his resignation from the central ministry. Karunanidhi family started Kalaignar TV to counter Sun TV of the Marans that started focusing on opposition leaders who were vociferous on Alagiri and also covering the 2G Spectrum case on minister A Raja, the DMK minister replacing Dayanidhi in the Union IT ministry. There were several attempts of reconciliation by the Marans, with two public meeting, once during Stalin's birthday in March 2008 and other during May when Karunanidhi was discharged from a Chennai hospital having been treated for neck and back pain. But when the Marans went to greet Karunanidhi on his 85th birthday on 3 Jun 2008, they were made to wait for an hour before finally denying entry. The family later reconciled with the efforts of Selvi and M K Stalin. While the reason for reconciliation is not known, it was rumoured that the family reconciled to keep the third wife, Rajathi and her daughter Kanimozhi away from the family - that Kanimozhi was missing in the family reunion picture supported this argument.

On scientific corruption and ‘recommendation letters’

The Sarkaria Commission was constituted in February 1976, soon after the DMK government was dismissed by the Indira Gandhi dispensation. It is said that Justice Sarkaria was so taken in by the ingenuity with which public funds were embezzled that he described it as “scientific corruption”. However, there appears to be no record in the public domain of him having used the term.

=== 2G Spectrum Case ===
As per the chargesheet filed by CBI, Kanimozhi has 20% stake in her family owned Kalaignar TV, her step-mother Dayalu owns 60% stake in the same channel. CBI alleges that Kanimozhi was an "active brain" behind the channel's operations and she worked along with former telecom minister A. Raja to get DB Realty promoter Shahid Balwa to circuitously route ₹2 billion (US$21 million) to Kalaignar TV. According to CBI, Kanimozhi was in regular touch with A Raja regarding launching of Kalaignar TV channel and its other pending works. CBI alleges that A Raja was further pursuing the cause of Kalaignar TV not only for getting registration of the company from Ministry of Information and Broadcasting but also for getting it in the DTH operator TATA Sky's bouquet. The charges levelled against her are criminal conspiracy to cause criminal breach of trust by a public servant, criminal conspiracy under section 120-B, cheating under section 420 & forgery under sections 468 and 471. Booked under the Prevention of Corruption Act. She was taken into custody (arrested) by CBI on 20 May 2011. and granted bail on 28 November 2011 after spending 188 days in judicial custody. As of May 2012, trial is being conducted in Special CBI Court.

Dayanidhi Maran was forced to resign from his Textiles Ministry in the central government on account corruption charges levelled against him in the 2G spectrum case. Dayanidhi has been accused of criminal conspiracy by the CBI on charges under Prevention of Corruption Act. An FIR or formal complaint has been filed against Dayanidhi and his brother, Kalanithi Maran, the owner of Sun Network in Tamil Nadu. The homes and offices of the Marans in Delhi and Chennai were raided on 10 October 2011 in connection with the CBI's efforts to prove that when he was telecom minister, Dayanidhi misused his office to help an entrepreneur from Malaysia named T Ananda Krishnan to acquire one of India's biggest telecoms, Aircel. The CBI alleged that in return, Mr Ananda Krishnan invested more than Rs. 6 billion in Dayanidhi's brother Kalanidhi owned Sun Network.

=== Azhagiri Vs Stalin ===
The issue of succession of party and the political leadership has always been oriented towards Azhagiri and Stalin, the brothers and apparent political heirs of Karunanidhi. The general council of 3 February 2012 fuelled heated debates on who should be the successor and finally lead to a conclusion of Karunanidhi remaining the head, putting the topic of succession to a temporary end. Azhagiri garners support from Southern Tamil Nadu, which is termed as his political stronghold. The 2011 assembly election drubbing put his power under scanner with the party losing most in the southern parts of Tamil Nadu. Stalin was seen as the natural heir after he was given the post of Mayor of Chennai Corporation during October 2001 and subsequently the Deputy Chief Minister post of Tamil Nadu government on 29 May 2009. The survey poll conducted by Dinakaran newspaper of the Marans created further feud in the family. In a wikileaks revealed cable sent on 9 July 2009, the then US counsel General Andrew T Simkin predicted that M K Azhagiri will contest with Stalin for power once his father leaves the scene, but will be finally prevailed by M K Stalin, who is more acceptable. It also touched upon Azhagiri's noteirty and pugnacious tactics for his alleged involvement in Ta Krittinan murder case, for which he was arrested in 2003 and also on the attack of Dinakaran newspaper office in 2007.

=== Dominance in Tamil film industry ===
There are allegations on many family members of Karunanidhi entering Tamil film distribution and production on account of political backing. "Karunanidhi has used his political might to thrust his entire family on Tamil cinema," said Thuglak editor Cho Ramaswamy, in one of the interviews that fuelled a retort from Karunanidhi, "If Prithviraj Kapoor’s family is in films till today, if Rajnikanth’s daughter can produce movies and his son-in-law Dhanush can act, what is wrong if my grandsons Kalanidhi, Udayanidhi, Dayanidhi, Arulnidhi and Arivunidihi are into film-making? It is just another conspiracy by the threaded class (Brahmins) because I work for the Dravidian community" after laying the foundation stone for a colony for film workers on 23 August 2010. The feeling of political might is supported by the production of films by family members starting ventures, leaving Sun Pictures during the DMK government of 2006–2011. The distributors also complained of level-playing field with the political clout involved in distribution of films.

== List of Posts held by the family ==
**Family Member**	**Governance post**	**Years**
M. Karunanidhi	DMK Party Leader	1969–2018
M. Karunanidhi	Member of Tamil Nadu Legislative Assembly	1957–2018
M. Karunanidhi	Chief Minister of Tamil Nadu	1969-1976, 1989–1991, 1996–2001, 2006–2011
M. Karunanidhi	Leader of Opposition in Tamil Nadu Legislative Assembly	1977-1983
M. K. Stalin	DMK Party Leader	2018– Present
M. K. Stalin	Deputy Chief Minister of Tamil Nadu	2009–2011
M. K. Stalin	President of Youth Wing, DMK	1982–2017
M. K. Stalin	Member of Tamil Nadu Legislative Assembly	1989–1991, 1996–2026
M. K. Stalin	Leader of Opposition in Tamil Nadu Legislative Assembly	2016–2021
M. K. Stalin	Chief Minister of Tamil Nadu	2021–2026
Dayanidhi Maran	**Member of Parliament, Lok Sabha**	2004–2014, 2019–present
Dayanidhi Maran	Minister of Communications and Information Technology	2004-2007
M. K. Alagiri	Member of Parliament, Lok Sabha	2009–2014
M. K. Alagiri	Minister of Chemicals and Fertilizers	2009-2013
Kanimozhi Karunanidhi
Kanimozhi Karunanidhi	Member of Parliament, Rajya Sabha	2007-2019
Kanimozhi Karunanidhi	**Member of Parliament, Lok Sabha**	2019–present
Kanimozhi Karunanidhi	**Deputy General Secretary of the DMK**	October 2022 – Present
Udhayanidhi Stalin	**Youth Wing Secretary of DMK**	2019–present
Udhayanidhi Stalin	**Member of Tamil Nadu Legislative Assembly**	2021–present
Udhayanidhi Stalin	Minister for Youth Welfare and Sports Development	December 2022 – 2026
Udhayanidhi Stalin	Deputy Chief Minister of Tamil Nadu	September 2024 – 2026
Udhayanidhi Stalin	Leader of Opposition in Tamil Nadu Legislative Assembly	2026-

Bold denotes posts still held by the Karunanidhi family.

== Organisations related to the family ==
Organization	Family Member	Post	Years	Notes
Kalaignar TV	Dayalu Ammal	Owner	2008–present	60% share holder
Kalaignar TV	Kanimozhi Karunanidhi	Owner	2008–present	20% share holder
Westgate Logistics Private Ltd	Rajathe Ammal & Kanimozhi Karunanidhi	Owner	2004–present	Supporting and auxiliary transport activities; activities of travel agencies
Sun Group	Kalanithi Maran	Chairman and MD	1993–present	Group of Kal Media Services Pvt. Ltd. 32 TV Channels across Indian languages 45 Radio stations across all India; 2 daily newspapers in Tamil language 4 weekly magazines in Tamil language Sun Pictures - a leading film production and distribution company Sun Direct - one of India's leading DTH companies, also first to carry HD channels in India; Sumangali Cable Vision (SCV) - Multi System Operators (MSO); Sun 18 south - to distribute its channels Kal Airways Pvt. Ltd. Spicejet; Sunrisers Hyderabad, IPL(Indian premier league)Cricket Team
Cloud Nine Movies	Dayanidhi Azhagiri	Owner	2008–present	Tamil film production and distribution company
Red Giant Movies	Udhayanidhi Stalin	Owner	2008–present	Tamil film production and distribution company
Mohana Movies	M. K. Tamilarasu	Owner	2008–present	Tamil film production company
Daya Cyber Park Private Limited, Madurai	Alagiri Family	Owner	2006–present	Cyber Park
Inbox 1305	Kiruthiga Udhayanithi	Owner, Editor	2008–present	The Week Magazine
Nefertari	Anusha Dayanidhi	Owner	2012–present	Event Management Company
Tamil Mayyam	Kanimozhi Karunanidhi	Director		Non-governmental Organization

== Declared assets of the political members of the family ==
Family Member	Assets Worth (in INR)	As on Date	Notes
M.K. Stalin and Durga	2.2 Cr	22 March 2011	Rs 42.28 lakh worth of movable property which includes fixed deposit, joint account with wife and life insurance. The approximate value of their immovable property based on market value was Rs 169.3 lakh.
Karunanidhi, Dayalu and Rajathi	41.13 Cr	24 March 2011	Karunanidhi has moveable assets of around Rs. 4.93 crore, Rs. 15.34 crore for his first wife, Dayalu and Rs. 20.83 crore for his second wife Rajathi. Karunanidhi has an income of Rs. 37 lakh per annum Rs. 64 lakhs for Dayalu and 1.67 Cr for Rajathi.
M K Azhagiri, Kanthi Azhagiri	133.65 Cr	6 August 2011	Azhagiri owns 18 acres and 63 cents of agricultural land, 1 acre and 82 cents plus 23,278 sq ft non-agricultural land, a 20 cent plot, flats in Chennai and Madurai, 4 crore in fixed deposit and 1.39 crore in his savings account.
Kanimozhi	8.45 Cr	4 June 2007	She owns fixed deposits worth Rs 6.58 crores, a commercial building in Anna Salai worth Rs 1.61 crores, shares worth Rs 3.5 lakh in a company called Westgate Logistics, gold and diamond jewellery worth Rs 3.61 lakh and a car, Toyota Camry worth Rs 18.7 lakh.
Dayanidhi Maran	2.94 Cr	3 September 2011	He and his wife have shares in RIL, Reliance Communications, RNRL and DK Enterprises

== See also ==
- Political families of the world
- Political families of India
