= KTV (India) =

Indian Tamil-language television channel

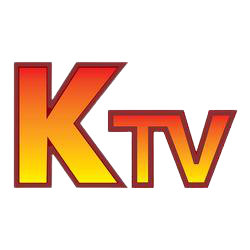
- Logo used since 2001
- Country: India
- Broadcast area: India, Sri Lanka, Singapore, Malaysia
- Network: Sun TV Network
- Headquarters: Chennai, Tamil Nadu, India

Programming
- Language: Tamil
- Picture format: 1080p HDTV

Ownership
- Owner: Sun Group
- Sister channels: Sun TV Network (channels)

History
- Launched: 22 October 2001; 25 years ago

Links
- Website: K TV

Availability

Streaming media
- Sun NXT India: K TV

K TV is an Indian pay television channel owned by Sun TV Network. It broadcasts Tamil-language films. It was launched on 22 October 2001.

== History ==
The letter K in KTV stands for Kondattam, which means celebration. The channel was launched on 22 October 2001 by Kalanidhi Maran, the chairman of Sun TV Network. At the time of launch, Sun TV Network's library had over 5,000 movies. Its HD counterpart was launched on 11 December 2011. At Every Friday and Saturday, KTV Channel premiered more new and blockbuster movies which was telecast by Sun TV until now.

== List of films broadcast ==
KTV broadcast several films including:

Film	Date aired	Time aired	Ref.
Thirumalai (2003)	25 July 2014	7:30 p.m.	
Pudhiya Mugam (1993)	31 July 2014	10:00 a.m.	
Evano Oruvan (2007)	11 September 2014	4:30 p.m.	
Neram (2013)	13 September 2014	7:00 p.m.	
Samsaram Adhu Minsaram (1986)	11 May 2021	7:00 p.m.	

== List of television specials broadcast ==
Title	Date Aired	Time Aired	Notes	Ref.
—N/a	7 November 2014	—N/a	60th birthday for Kamal Haasan special	
Ulagam Engum Rajini	12 December 2014	7:00 p.m.	Worldwide fans wish Rajinikanth on his birthday	
Celebrity Cricket League	24 December 2017	2:00 p.m., 6:00 p.m.	Match between Chennai Rhinos and Bengal Tigers	
