= Sun Gemini =

Indian Telugu-language TV channel

- Country: India
- Broadcast area: Worldwide
- Network: Sun TV Network
- Headquarters: Hyderabad, Telangana, India

Programming
- Language: Telugu
- Picture format: 1080p HDTV

Ownership
- Owner: Sun Group
- Sister channels: Sun TV Network (Channels)

History
- Launched: 9 February 1995 (31 years ago)

Links
- Website: Sun Gemini HD

Sun Gemini is an Indian Telugu language general entertainment pay television channel owned by Sun TV Network. It is the first satellite TV channel in Telugu. It was launched on 9 February 1995 by the Gemini Group of Hyderabad (run by Akkineni Manohar Prasad, grandson of L. V. Prasad), in association with Sun TV Network. In 1996–97, Sun TV Network acquired a controlling interest in the channel. The channel's programming consists of serials, films, film-based programs and game shows alongside some reality shows. Sun Gemini HD was launched on 11 December 2011.

== History ==
Gemini TV logo from 1995 to 2026

Sun Gemini was launched on 9 February 1995. It is founded by the Gemini Group of Hyderabad (run by Akkineni Manohar Prasad, grandson of L. V. Prasad), in association with Sun TV Network. In 1996–97, Sun TV Network acquired a controlling interest in the channel. Gemini TV is the first satellite TV channel in Telugu. Gemini TV began with only a four-hour service via a Rimsat satellite uplinked from Singapore. Later it expanded its broadcast time to 12 hours a day. By May 2000, Gemini was considered as a strong number two to the leader ETV.

Sun TV Network, its parent company, tried to regain dwindling viewership by introducing some new reality shows. The effort was only a partial success. As of September 2022, the network has not regained its lost viewership, with viewership still decreasing.

The Sun Group started working in the television business through three companies of which Gemini Television Private Limited broadcast Telugu language channels, while Sun Television Private Limited and Uday Television Private Limited broadcast Tamil and Kannada language channels respectively. In November 2006, Kalanithi Maran merged Gemini TV Ltd with Sun TV Network Ltd along with Udaya TV Ltd for the IPO listing of Sun TV Network.

Sun18

Network18 Group has 50% dealing distribution with Sun TV Network, which led them to make Sun18. In July 2010, with the creation of Sun18, Sun TV Network became responsible for the South Indian market, while Network18 was responsible for the North Indian market.

== Sister channels ==
=== Sun Gemini Movies ===
Sun Gemini Movies is an Indian Telugu language movies pay television channel owned by Sun TV Network. it was launched in May 2000 as Teja TV. In October 2010, it was renamed as Gemini Movies.

=== Sun Gemini Music ===
Sun Gemini Music is India's first Telugu language music pay television channel owned by the Sun TV Network. It was launched in 2005.

=== Kushi TV ===
Kushi TV is an Indian Telugu language kids pay television channel owned by Sun TV Network. It was launched on 9 April 2009 and broadcasts cartoons and kids programmes.

=== Sun Gemini Comedy ===
Sun Gemini Comedy is India's first Telugu language comedy pay television channel owned by Sun TV Network. It was launched in 2009 as Navvulu TV and later it was renamed as Gemini Comedy.

=== Sun Gemini Life ===
Sun Gemini Life is an Indian Telugu language classic movie pay television channel which broadcasts classic movies. It was launched in 2013.

== Defunct Channels ==
=== Gemini News ===
Gemini News (formerly Teja News) was an Indian Telugu language news pay television channel owned by Sun TV Network. It was launched in May 2004 with much publicity and got good ratings on the first 7-10 years but after the entry of various players its ratings gradually decreased in the competitive segment and mounted to losses. As a result, it was closed on 1 February 2019 and was replaced by Bengali General Entertainment Channel, Sun Bangla.

== See also ==
- Sun TV (India)
- List of Telugu-language television channels
