= Oorkavalan =

- Theatrical release poster
- Directed by: Manobala
- Written by: A. L. Narayanan (dialogues)
- Screenplay by: Rama Veerappan
- Story by: Rama Veerappan
- Produced by: G. Thyagarajan; V. Thamilazhagan
- Starring: Rajinikanth; Radhika
- Cinematography: B. S. Lokanath
- Edited by: K. R. Krishnan
- Music by: Shankar–Ganesh
- Production company: Sathya Movies
- Release date: 4 September 1987
- Running time: 137 minutes
- Country: India
- Language: Tamil

Oorkavalan (transl. Village Guard) is a 1987 Indian Tamil-language action drama film directed by Manobala, starring Rajinikanth and Radhika. The film, released on 4 September 1987, was a super hit at the box office.

== Plot ==
The story describes the struggle of a young villager Kangeyan to receive justice for his brother's murder. Manickam falls in love with Mallika, the daughter of Pannaiyar. Mallika's marriage is arranged with Durai, but she refuses and declares her love for Manickam. Kangeyan gets them married in the village. The priest pretends to have divine powers and uses the superstitious beliefs of the villagers to kill Manickam. Kangeyan, not wanting to see Mallika as a widow, decides to get her married again to Pandiyan, a cart driver who was her childhood friend. Durai intervenes again proceeding to use superstition again and Kangeyan learns about the truth behind his brother's death exposing the priest and Durai, losing his lover in the process.

== Cast ==
- Rajinikanth as Kangeyan
- Radhika as Vadivu
- Pandiyan as Pandiyan
- Raghuvaran as Rajadurai
- Sangili Murugan as Swami
- Malaysia Vasudevan as President
- Manoj Krishna as Manickam
- Vennira Aadai Moorthy as Accountant
- Y. G. Mahendran as Rajadurai's friend
- Chithra as Mallika
- Kumarimuthu as Kangeyan's friend
- Idichapuli Selvaraj as Kangeyan's friend
- Ennatha Kannaiya as Photographer
- Mannangatti Subramaniam as gambler
- Sethu Vinayagam
- S. N. Parvathy
- Azhagu
- Usilai Mani
- Sivachandran as DSP

== Production ==
After the success of Sirai Paravai, Manobala was approached by Poompuhar Productions to direct a film for them (Palaivana Rojakkal), and separately by Rajinikanth for Sathya Movies for another film (Oorkavalan). This presented him with a dilemma of which film to choose, thus he spoke to Murasoli Selvam and M. Karunanidhi who advised him to direct the Rajinikanth film which would boost his career to which he agreed. The filming was held at Mysore and was completed within 46 days.

== Soundtrack ==
The music was composed by Shankar–Ganesh. Manobala initially wanted debutant Narayan (who would later be known as Sirpy) to compose the music; however Veerappan felt it would be tough for him to handle songs for a film of a star, hence replaced with Shankar–Ganesh.

Track listing
No.	Title	Lyrics	Singer(s)	Length
1.	"Maasi Maasam Than"	Vaali	S. P. Balasubrahmanyam, K. S. Chithra	5:10
2.	"Muthamma"	Pulamaipithan	Malaysia Vasudevan	4:32
3.	"Malligai Poovukku"	Pulamaipithan	Vani Jairam, Malaysia Vasudevan	4:47
4.	"Melam Kotti Aadu"	Muthulingam	S. P. Balasubrahmanyam, K. S. Chithra	4:30
5.	"Pattu Chattaikaran"	Na. Kamarasan	S. Janaki	3:54
6.	"Edutha Sabatham"	Vairamuthu	K. J. Yesudas	4:00
7.	"Aathukulley"	Pulamaipithan	K. S. Chithra, Uma Ramanan, Mano	4:57
Total length:				31:50

== Release and reception ==
Oorkavalan was released on 4 September 1987. N. Krishnaswamy of The Indian Express wrote, "Some of the characters get a lifelike quality because of good performances and a helpful screenplay." Jayamanmadhan of Kalki wrote no one is going to go to the film with high expectations as the title Oorkavalan goes by it has too many masala so no one is going to be disappointed. Balumani of Anna praised acting, music and direction.
