= Murasoli Selvam =

Indian newspaper editor and journalist (1940–2024)

3rd Chief Editor of Murasoli
- In office 2 December 1989 – 2022 (?)
- Preceded by: Murasoli Maran
- Succeeded by: To be ascertained

Personal details
- Born: Pannirselvam; 24 April 1940 Thiruvarur, Madras Province, British India (now Tamil Nadu, India)
- Died: 10 October 2024 (aged 84) Bengaluru, Karnataka, India
- Spouse: M. K. Selvi
- Relations: Murasoli Maran (elder brother); Karunanidhi family (Father in law)
- Parents: Shanmuga Sundarathammal (mother); Shanmugasundaram (father)
- Occupation: Journalist, film producer

Shanmugasundaram Pannirselvam (24 April 1940 – 10 October 2024), popularly known as Murasoli Selvam, was a political journalist and film producer from Tamil Nadu, India. For over three decades, he served as the chief editor of Murasoli, the mouthpiece of the Dravida Munnetra Kazhagam (DMK). Through his maternal side, he was related to the Karunanidhi family.

== Early life ==
He was born on 24 April 1940 in Thiruvarur, a town in present-day Tamil Nadu. His mother was Shanmuga Sundarathammal, whose younger brother M. Karunanidhi, (the patriarch of the Karunanidhi family) would later serve five terms as the Chief Minister of Tamil Nadu (between 1969 and 2011). Karunanidhi initially named the boy as Pannirselvam in memory of Justice Party leader A. T. Pannirselvam, who had died in a plane crash earlier on 1 March of that year. Selvam would later marry Karunanidhi's daughter Selvi.

Selvam's elder brother Murasoli Maran served as a Union Minister (during 1989–2002) under four Indian Prime Ministers - V. P. Singh, H. D. Deve Gowda, I. K. Gujral, and Atal Bihari Vajpayee.

Selvam was associated with the Dravida Munnetra Kazhagam (DMK) early on, and made his mark as a student leader during the 1965-67 Anti-Hindi agitations.

== Career at Murasoli ==
=== Assuming charge ===
He began his journalistic career along with Maran for Murasoli. After Maran went on to become a Union Minister under V. P. Singh, Selvam became the editor in 1989.

On 22 May 1991, the day after the assassination of former Indian Prime Minister Rajiv Gandhi, the Murasoli office at Kodambakkam locality of Madras (now Chennai) was attacked and set on fire. Vehicles, documents, printing papers and the printing press owned by the newspaper were all burnt down. Despite the destruction, the daily came out the next day, with the headline 'Murasoli Will Take It'.

Eventually, he came to be known as Murasoli Selvam. His editorial work in Murasoli played a pivotal role in uplifting the DMK's public image.

=== 1991-92 Breach of Privilege controversy ===
On 9 September 1991, Parithi Ilamvazhuthi, then the only DMK MLA in the Tamil Nadu Legislative Assembly, delivered a speech regarding the Tamil Nadu Housing Board. A part of his speech was expunged from the House notes that afternoon by the Speaker Sedapatti R. Muthiah. While the deletion was reflected in the Chennai edition of Murasoli, the daily's outstation editions contained the expunged text, as they have been printed by 2 pm. Also, around this time, one of his articles criticised some actions of the then Chief Minister J. Jayalalithaa, especially highlighting the sequence of events that unfolded during her stay in Kodanad estate. This had garnered him political opposition. Ultimately, a direct privilege motion was filed against him by Jayalalithaa.

After investigation, the Assembly's Committee on Privileges issued a notice to Selvam, seeking an explanation. He was ordered to appear before the Committee despite his explanation. He appeared before the committee but refused to apologise. He was arrested on 11 May 1992 and brought before Muthiah. He was ordered to appear on the day of the next sitting of the Legislature to receive its censure. Accordingly, a notice was sent to him to appear in the Assembly on 21 September. On that designated date, Selvam appeared in the Assembly, wearing a black shirt as a mark of protest. and was put in a defendant's dock. The MLAs from CPI, CPI(M), and PMK protested the move and staged a walkout. After this, the condemnation of the House was read, following which Selvam was discharged.

This event made Selvam the first newspaper editor in Tamil Nadu to be reprimanded at the Bar of the Legislative Assembly.

=== Later years ===
In November 2003, the Legislative Assembly's Committee on Privileges sentenced six journalists, including Selvam, to 15 days in prison for writing critically of Jayalalithaa's activities in the Assembly.

=== Legacy ===
Selvam published a memoir titled Murasoli Sila Ninaivalaigal (A Few Memories regarding Murasoli), where he articulated the plethora of first hand experiences with the newspaper, highlighting its crucial aspect and role in analysing the political challenges and roadblocks.

According to his acquaintances, he was known for his quiet nature, never seeking political positions despite his closeness to the DMK leadership.

Selvam passionately continued his work in Murasoli under the pseudonym "Silandhi" (transl. Spider). His last officially published article appeared in Murasoli on 8 August 2024, wherein he was critical of R. N. Ravi (Governor of Tamil Nadu), calling out his religious politics.

== Partial filmography ==
=== As producer ===
Year	Title	Screenplay	Story/based on	Director	Starring
1978	Vandikkaran Magan	M. Karunanidhi	C. N. Annadurai	Amirtham	Jaishankar, M. R. Radha, and Jayachitra
1986	Palaivana Rojakkal	M. Karunanidhi	Vartha by T. Damodaran	Manivannan	Sathyaraj, Lakshmi, Nalini and Prabhu
1987	Puyal Paadum Paattu	M. Karunanidhi	Bharathan	Manivannan	Radhika and Raghuvaran
1988	Paasa Paravaigal	M. Karunanidhi (dialogues)	Cochin Haneefa		Sivakumar, Lakshmi, Mohan and Radhika

== Death and tributes ==
On 9 October 2024, Selvam (then living in Bengaluru, Karnataka and receiving treatment at a private hospital there) had been reportedly compiling a frontpage column for Murasoli (a colleague would later report that Selvam had called to discuss the work and finalise a cartoon for the publication). The next day (10 October), Selvam suffered a heart attack and died at the age of 84.

Chief Minister M. K. Stalin, as president of the DMK, mourned that he lost "the last shoulder and ideological pillar to lean on". The party announced that the party's flag would be hoisted in half-mast for three days in recognition of Selvam's contribution to the party's growth. Tributes poured in from key DMK leaders and legislators (including Udhayanidhi Stalin) and film personalities (including Sathyaraj). Leaders of parties and organizations including INC (Tamil Nadu unit), MDMK, VCK, CPI, CPI(M), IUML, MNM, Dravidar Kazhagam (DK), and Dravidar Viduthalai Kazhagam (DVK) also expressed their condolence.

Selvam's funeral was held on 11 October at the crematorium in Besant Nagar, Chennai.

His portrait was opened at the DMK headquarters on 21 October. At the event, Stalin announced that a trust would be established in Selvam's name to annually confer awards to works and creators from the Dravidian movement.

On 24 April 2025, Selvam's bust was opened at the Murasoli office by Stalin. Among those present at the event were the DMK's general secretary Durai Murugan, treasurer T. R. Baalu DK president K. Veeramani, and Kalaignar TV's director Amirtham (son of Periyanayagi Ammal, another of Karunanidhi's sisters). A new collection of Selvam's essays, titled Silandhi Katturaigal was released by Durai Murugan at the event, with Veeramani receiving the first copy.
