= Murasoli Maran =

Indian politician (1934 – 2003)

Murasoli
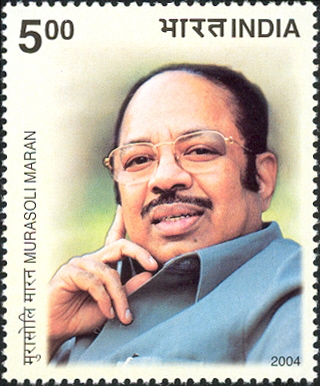

Member of Parliament, Lok Sabha
- In office 15 May 1996 – 23 November 2003
- Preceded by: Era Anbarasu
- Succeeded by: Dayanidhi Maran
- Constituency: Chennai Central
- In office 4 March 1967 – 23 March 1977
- Preceded by: C. N. Annadurai
- Succeeded by: R Venkatraman
- Constituency: Chennai South

Union Minister for Commerce and Industry
- In office 13 October 1999 – 9 November 2002
- Prime Minister: Atal Bihari Vajpayee
- Preceded by: Ramakrishna Hegde
- Succeeded by: Arun Shourie

Union Minister for Industry
- In office 1 June 1996 – 19 March 1998
- Prime Minister: H. D. Dewe Gowda; I. K. Gujral
- Preceded by: Suresh Prabhu
- Succeeded by: Sikander Bakht

Member of Parliament, Rajya Sabha
- In office 25 July 1977 – 25 July 1995
- Chairman of the House: B. D. Jatti; Mohammad Hidayatullah; R. Venkatraman; Shankar Dayal Sharma; K. R. Narayanan
- Constituency: Tamil Nadu

Minister for Urban Development
- In office 2 December 1989 – 10 November 1990
- Prime Minister: V. P. Singh
- Preceded by: Mohsina Kidwai
- Succeeded by: Daulat Ram Saran

Personal details
- Born: Murasoli Maran; 17 August 1934 Thirukuvalai, Madras Presidency, British India (present-day Tamil Nadu, India)
- Died: 23 November 2003 (aged 69) Chennai, Tamil Nadu, India
- Party: Dravida Munnetra Kazhagam
- Spouse: Mallika Maran (m. 1963)
- Children: Kalanidhi Maran (b.1964); Dayanidhi Maran (b.1966); Anbukarasi (b.1978)
- Parent: Shanmugasundari
- Relatives: Karunanidhi family
- Education: Pachaiyappa's College, Madras Law College

Murasoli Maran (17 August 1934 – 23 November 2003) was an Indian politician and leader of the Dravida Munnetra Kazhagam (DMK) party, which was headed by his maternal uncle and mentor, M. Karunanidhi. A Member of Parliament for 36 years, he was Union Minister in three separate central governments, and in charge of Urban Development in the V. P. Singh government; Industry in the Gowda and Gujral governments; and Commerce and Industry under Vajpayee. Outside of politics, Maran was a journalist and scriptwriter for films.

== Biography ==
Murasoli Maran was born on 17 August 1934 to Shanmugasundari, the elder sister of M. Karunanidhi, in Thirukkuvalai, Madras Presidency in present-day Tamil Nadu. After completing his basic education in his hometown, he moved to Madras to get an M.A. from Pachaiyappa's College and Madras Law College. While at school, he became involved with DMK. Before joining politics, he was an editor for the Tamil daily newspaper Murasoli and the English weekly The Rising Sun. He also worked on the Tamil-language publications Kungumam, Muththaram, Vannathirai and Sumangali. Maran later worked as a social worker. He was vocal against Hindi being introduced in Tamil Nadu and was arrested during the Agitation of 1965. He was detained for a year under the Maintenance of Internal Security Act.

Maran was first elected to Lok Sabha in 1967, followed by a reelection in 1971. He was a member of Rajya Sabha from 1977 to 1995, during which he was on the Committee on Public Undertakings for three terms. Other committees he took part in were the General Purposes Committee (1980–1982); the Public Accounts Committee (1980–1982, 1991-1995); the Committee on the Welfare of Scheduled Castes and Scheduled Tribes (1982–1983, 1987-1988); and the Committee on Subordinate Legislation (1988–1989); the Joint Parliamentary Committee to enquire into irregularities in the securities and banking transactions (1992–1993). He also served as Union Cabinet Minister, first in Urban Development (1989-1990), then in Industry (1996-1998, 1999-2002). He then returned to Lok Sabha in 1996, 1998, and 1999. Prior to his death in November 2003, he was a Cabinet Minister without portfolio.

Maran married Mallika on 15 September 1963 he and they had two sons, Dayanidhi and Kalanithi, and one daughter, Anbukarasi. Dayanidhi Maran previously served as an MP and Union Minister and Kalanithi owns Sun TV. Anbukarasi is a cardiologist. Maran was admitted to Houston Methodist Hospital in the United States on 14 November 2002 with heart (hypertrophic cardiomyopathy) and kidney issues. He later received treatment at Apollo Hospital in Chennai. In late 2003, he fell into a coma, eventually dying aged 69 on 23 November 2003. He was a Minister without portfolio when he died, with his portfolio given to Arun Shourie. Then-Prime Minister Atal Bihari Vajpayee was among those who attended his funeral in Chennai. He was survived by his mother, uncle, wife, children, children-in-law and grandchildren.

== Rajya Sabha Election History ==
Position	Party	Constituency	From	To	Tenure
Member of Parliament, Rajya Sabha (1st Term)	DMK	Tamil Nadu	25 July 1977	24 July 1983	5 years, 364 days
Member of Parliament, Rajya Sabha (2nd Term)	DMK	Tamil Nadu	25 July 1983	24 July 1989	5 years, 364 days
Member of Parliament, Rajya Sabha (3rd Term)	DMK	Tamil Nadu	25 July 1989	24 July 1995	5 years, 364 days

== Filmography ==
Outside of politics, Maran was involved in the Tamil-language film industry, writing screenplays for more than 20, producing five, and directing two. The Sangeet Natak Academy conferred the title Kalai-Mamani in 1975. He was awarded the President's Certificate of Merit and Tamil Nadu Government Award for three films in the category Best Feature Film.

Year	Title	Writer	Producer	Director	Notes	Refs
1957	Kula Dheivam	X				
1958	Annaiyin Aanai	X				
1958	Anbu Engey	X				
1959	Thalai Koduthaan Thambi	X				
1959	Sahodhari	X				
1959	Nalla Theerpu	X				
1966	Marakka Mudiyumaa?		X	X		
1967	Valiba Virunthu		X	X		
1970	Engal Thangam	X	X			
1972	Pillaiyo Pillai		X			

== See also ==
- Political Families of India
- Political Families of The World
