= ModiLuft =

Airline of India (1984–1996)

Modiluft
IATA	ICAO	Call sign
HT; M9	MOD	MODILUFT
- Founded: 14 March 1984; 42 years ago
- Commenced operations: 17 February 1993; 33 years ago (as MG Express); 12 April 1995; 31 years ago (as ModiLuft)
- Ceased operations: 1996; 30 years ago
- Hubs: Indira Gandhi International Airport
- Parent company: Modi Enterprises; Lufthansa Group
- Headquarters: Delhi
- Key people: S. K. Modi (Chairman); Ashotosh Dyal Sharma

ModiLuft was a private airline based in Delhi, India. It operated on domestic routes until it shut down in 1996. It maintained high standards in flight safety, ground maintenance, and on-time performance owing to support from Lufthansa. ModiLuft's aircraft were configured in First, Business and Economy Class, making it the only private airline in India during its time to fly a three class configuration on domestic routes. It used Boeing 737-200 aircraft leased from Lufthansa and had an incident-free track record of flying.

== History ==
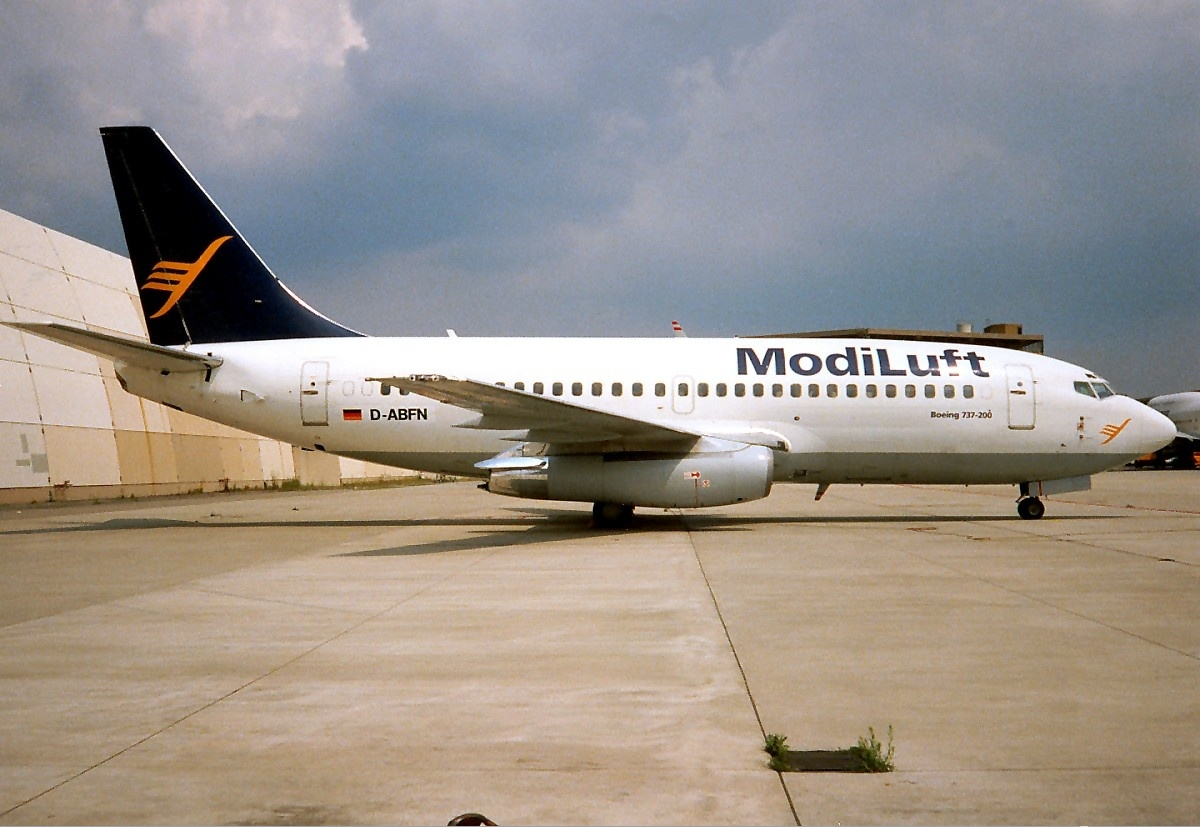
ModiLuft's livery was similar to that of Lufthansa.

ModiLuft was among the first of India's first post-deregulation airlines, launched in April 1993 by the Indian industrialist S. K. Modi, in technical partnership with the German flag carrier Lufthansa. The German airline provided pilots and trained ModiLuft's Indian staff including pilots, cabin crew, mechanics, and city and ground passenger handling staff. Lufthansa Technik provided maintenance, overhaul, and spares support. The airline project, started in February 1993 by Modi, Ashutosh Dayal Sharma, Yash Kohli, and Kanwar K. S. Jamwal, first flew from New Delhi to Mumbai on 5 May 1993. The airline commenced operations within three months of its conception. Kanwar K. S. Jamwal, General Manager Projects, was responsible for setting up the airline and its operations and put together a team of Indian and German engineers and pilots. Capt. R L. Kapur was the Managing Director, and Wing. Cdr. S. Raj (Retd.) Capt. Manoj Airon along with a team of able airline experts, R. K. Anand and Kavita Batra, helped in meeting the aviation industry standards and in conforming to the Indian Aircraft Rules set by the Directorate General of Civil Aviation. The first two batches of the cabin crew were trained at Lufthansa's flight crew training facility at Frankfurt. Modiluft was the only airline to achieve an average aircraft utilisation of a minimum 12 hours per day and an on-time departure CSAT score of 98.8% in India.

The two companies parted ways after the Indian partner accused Lufthansa of not abiding by its funding commitment. In turn, the German airline alleged that ModiLuft had defaulted on lease payments for the four Lufthansa aircraft. The relationship between the two parties soured in mid-1996 after Modi began putting pressure on Lufthansa to take a stake of up to 40 per cent in the Indian carrier. In May 1996, Lufthansa announced that they had decided to terminate their agreement with ModiLuft. The aircraft belonging to Lufthansa were grounded due to the litigation and ModiLuft acquired Boeing 737-400 aircraft from Air UK as replacements. The future of ModiLuft, however, was already sealed and the airline ceased operations in 1996.

ModiLuft eventually returned Lufthansa's aircraft by 30 September 1997 as part of an out-of-court settlement. The airline ownership changed hands due to lack of funds and was renamed Royal Airways, an airline that never got off the ground. ModiLuft's Air operator's certificate (AOC) had not lapsed and was eventually used by a different set of promoters for the Low-cost carrier SpiceJet.

== Destinations ==
India

- Delhi (Indira Gandhi International Airport), hub
- Jammu (Jammu Airport)
- Leh (Leh Kushok Bakula Rimpochee Airport)
- Srinagar (Srinagar Airport)
- Mumbai (Chhatrapati Shivaji International Airport)
- Bengaluru (HAL Bangalore International Airport)
- Hyderabad (Begumpet Airport)

== Historical fleet ==
- 4 Boeing 737-201
- 2 Boeing 737-400
- 1 Boeing 727-200
