= Puyal Paadum Paattu =

- Poster
- Directed by: Manivannan
- Screenplay by: M. Karunanidhi
- Story by: Bharathan
- Produced by: Murasoli Selvam
- Starring: Radikaa; Raghuvaran
- Cinematography: A. Sabhapathy
- Edited by: P. Venkateswara Rao
- Music by: Ilaiyaraaja
- Production company: Poompuhar Productions
- Release date: 21 October 1987
- Country: India
- Language: Tamil

Puyal Paadum Paattu (transl. Song of the storm) is a 1987 Indian Tamil-language film directed by Manivannan and written by M. Karunanidhi. It is a remake of the 1986 Malayalam film Pranamam. The film stars Radikaa and Raghuvaran, with Vinu Chakravarthy, Murali and Master Haja Sheriff in supporting roles. It was released on 21 October 1987.

== Cast ==
- Radikaa as the journalist
- Raghuvaran as the police inspector
- Vinu Chakravarthy
- Murali as the student leader
- Master Haja Sheriff as a student

== Themes ==
One of the main themes of the film is drug addiction.

== Soundtrack ==
The music was composed by Ilaiyaraaja. The song "Velu Muruganukku" is set in Mohanam raga.

Track listing
No.	Title	Lyrics	Singer(s)	Length
1.	"Vel Muruganukku"	Pulamaipithan	Malaysia Vasudevan
2.	"Kannana Kanne"	Pulamaipithan	K. S. Chithra
3.	"Ozhunga Padikka"	Gangai Amaran	S. P. Balasubrahmanyam
4.	"Puyal Oru Paattu"	Pulamaipithan	Malaysia Vasudevan
5.	"Annaadam"	Gangai Amaran	Malaysia Vasudevan, K. S. Chithra

== Release and reception ==
Puyal Paadum Paattu was released on 21 October 1987, during Diwali. The Indian Express wrote, "The campus scenes have impact. The sprinkling of good dancers, the exotic costumes, the catchy tunes and rhythms used in the songs and the general air of youthful vivacity come over beautifully". Jayamanmadhan of Kalki felt after the interval, the film lacks momentum and composure and felt rushed.
