= Palaivana Rojakkal =

1986 film by Manivannan

- Theatrical release poster
- Directed by: Manivannan
- Screenplay by: M. Karunanidhi
- Based on: Vartha by T. Damodaran
- Produced by: Murasoli Selvam
- Starring: Sathyaraj; Lakshmi; Nalini; Prabhu
- Cinematography: A. Sabapathy
- Edited by: P. Venkateswara Rao
- Music by: Ilaiyaraaja
- Production company: Poompuhar Productions
- Distributed by: N. M. T. Raman Agencies
- Release date: 1 November 1986
- Running time: 162 minutes
- Country: India
- Language: Tamil

Palaivana Rojakkal (pronounced [paːlaɪʋaɳa ɾoːdʑaːkkaɭ] transl. Desert roses) is a 1986 Indian Tamil-language political satire film written by M. Karunanidhi and directed by Manivannan. It is a remake of the Malayalam film Vartha, released earlier the same year. The film stars Sathyaraj, Lakshmi, Nalini and Prabhu. Palaivana Rojakkal was released on 1 November 1986 and became a commercial success.

== Plot ==
Journalist Sabarathnam, his lover and his friend fight a corrupt system to expose unscrupulous politicians.

== Cast ==
- Sathyaraj as Sabarathnam
- Lakshmi as Surya
- Nalini as Rani
- Prabhu as Babu
- Malaysia Vasudevan as VJV
- Vasanth as Sekar
- Vinu Chakravarthy as Aalavandhan
- S. S. Chandran as Kannayiram
- Delhi Ganesh as Chinnaiya
- Janagaraj as Majunu
- Vennira Aadai Moorthy as Aalavandhan's P.A.
- Thyagu as Ekambaram
- Charuhasan as Sabarathnam's grandfather
- Madhuri as Shanthi
- Chinni Jayanth as Sekar's friend
- Kamala Kamesh as Saraswathi Ammal
- Vijayan (guest appearance)

== Production ==
Politician M. Karunanidhi's production company Poompuhar Productions, after a layoff, sought to raise both political and financial capital. They chose to remake the 1986 Malayalam film Vartha in Tamil with the title Palaivana Rojakkal. Karunanidhi wrote the screenplay, while Manivannan directed the film, which was produced by Murasoli Selvam. Sathyaraj said he accepted to act in the film because it was a remake of a successful film and was guaranteed to do well. Cinematography was handled by A. Sabapathi, and editing by P. Venkateswara Rao. Karunanidhi appeared as himself onscreen, giving the opening and closing monologues. Some scenes were shot at Murasoli office.

== Themes ==
Palaivana Rojakkal is about the freedom of the press, and the "struggle between corrupt politicians and angry heroes". Writing in the Economic and Political Weekly, historian Kanakalatha Mukund noted that, in contrast Parasakthi (1952) and Manohara (1954) where Karunanidhi "virtually blasted the audience with extremely dramatic, alliterative dialogues", he used a "far more subdued and sophisticated style to convey his political message" in this film. Film critic Baradwaj Rangan compared Palaivana Rojakkal to Parasakthi for the way they "took on the times".

== Soundtrack ==
The soundtrack was composed by Ilaiyaraaja, while the lyrics were written by Gangai Amaran.

Track listing
No.	Title	Singer(s)	Length
1.	"Kadhal Enbadhu"	Ilaiyaraaja
2.	"Thoranthu"	Vani Jairam
3.	"Nenachathellam"	Ilaiyaraaja

== Release ==
Palaivana Rojakkal was released on 1 November 1986, during Diwali day, and distributed by N. M. T. Raman Agencies. Despite facing competition from other Diwali releases such as Maaveeran, Punnagai Mannan, and Aruvadai Naal, the film emerged a commercial success, and was instrumental in establishing Sathyaraj as a "mass hero". It also led to a slew of political films being made, mainly those which spoke against MLAs and ministers, depicting them as womanisers, drunkards and wheeler dealers.

== Critical reception ==
In a review dated 7 November 1986, N. Krishnaswamy of The Indian Express wrote, "One sees [Karunanidhi's] stamp in the hyperbolic references to the pen being mightier than the sword, and in certain needless allusions, but these however are not too long or too frequent to detract from the value of the film. The main strength of [Palaivana Rojakkal] is that it has some lively characters." Ananda Vikatan, in a review dated 23 November, said the film stands out because of the right cast chosen to play the various roles. The reviewer added that the artistes had acted competitively with each other, thus enhancing the appeal for the film and being worthy of appreciation. The reviewer added that the film stood out for attacking the-then political powers, and the backbone of the film was the dialogue written by Karunanidhi who adapted himself well for the 20th century and wrote dialogues which could be liked even by contemporary audiences. The reviewer said the director needs to be appreciated for making a hard-hitting film without worrying about the political consequences and rated the film 51 out of 100. Jayamanmadhan of Kalki wrote that the uneducated layman cannot be roused so much by the press; Palaivana Rojakkal should tap them.

== Bibliography ==
- Dhananjayan, G. (2011). The Best of Tamil Cinema, 1931 to 2010: 1977–2010. Galatta Media. OCLC 733724281.
- Rathinagiri, R. (2007). Time capsule of Kalaignar. Dravida Munnetra Kazhagam. OCLC 680676772.
