= Kungumam (magazine) =

Tamil magazine based in Chennai

- Cover of Kungumam dated 25.10.2010
- Categories: Entertainment
- Frequency: Weekly
- First issue: 25 December 1977
- Company: Sun Group
- Country: India
- Based in: Chennai
- Language: Tamil
- Website: Kungumam homepage

Kungumam (Tamil: குங்குமம், romanized: kuṅkumam) is a Tamil weekly entertainment magazine published in Chennai, India.

== History ==
Kungumam was first published on 25 December 1977. The magazine is owned by Kalanidhi Maran's Sun Group. According to the Indian Readership Survey 2006 Kungumam emerged as the top-selling Tamil weekly magazine overtaking historical market leaders such as Kumudam and Ananda Vikatan. Also, Kungumam is the second best-selling magazine in national league tables, ranking behind the Hindi weekly Saras Saleel. "Best kanna best" is the tagline for the magazine commercial.
