= Kaviya Maran =

Indian businesswoman (born 1992)

- Born: Kaviya Maran; 6 August 1992 (age 34); Chennai, Tamil Nadu, India
- Education: Stella Maris College, Chennai; Warwick Business School, United Kingdom
- Occupation: Businesswoman
- Known for: Executive Director, Sun TV Network; CEO, Sunrisers Hyderabad
- Spouse: Anirudh Ravichander (m. 2026)
- Parents: Kalanithi Maran (father); Kavery Maran (mother)

Kaviya Anirudh (née Maran) is an Indian businesswoman. She is the executive director of Sun TV Network and chief executive of the Indian Premier League franchise Sunrisers Hyderabad, owned by the Sun Group founded by her father Kalanithi Maran.

== Early life and education ==
Kaviya Maran was born on 6 August 1992 to Kalanithi and Kaveri Maran in Chennai. Her father is the founder of the Indian business conglomerate Sun Group. She graduated with a B.Com degree from Stella Maris College, Chennai and did her MBA from the Warwick Business School in the United Kingdom.

== Personal life ==
Kaviya married Anirudh Ravichander on 11 November 2026 in Greece.

== Career ==
In 2019, Kaviya became the executive director of Sun TV Network. She later became the chief executive of the Indian Premier League franchise Sunrisers Hyderabad, which had been acquired by the Sun Group in 2017. The Sun Group also co-owns the SA20 team Sunrisers Eastern Cape, and Sunrisers Leeds in the The Hundred.

== In the media ==
Kaviya featured in the "100 Women Achievers of India" list by India Today in 2023. In January 2024, she was honoured by Devi Awards. In 2025, she featured on The Hollywood Reporter "Women in Entertainment Power List". She was ranked #46 on Fortune India's "Most Powerful Women in Business" list in the same year. She was honoured by GQ Magazine as one of the "35 Most Influential Young Indians of 2025".
