= Vandikkaran Magan =

- Poster
- Directed by: Amirtham
- Screenplay by: M. Karunanidhi
- Story by: C. N. Annadurai
- Produced by: Murasoli Selvam
- Starring: Jaishankar; M. R. Radha; Jayachitra
- Cinematography: Amirtham
- Edited by: K. R. Ramalingam
- Music by: M. S. Viswanathan
- Production company: Poompuhar Productions
- Release date: 30 October 1978
- Country: India
- Language: Tamil

Vandikkaran Magan (transl. Cartman's son) is a 1978 Indian Tamil-language film photographed and directed by Amirtham, and written by M. Karunanidhi. It is based on the play of the same name by C. N. Annadurai. The film stars Jaishankar, M. R. Radha and Jayachitra. It was released on 30 October 1978 and became a major success. The film was remade in Telugu as Ammayi Mogudu Mamaku Yamudu (1980).

== Cast ==
- Jaishankar
- M. R. Radha
- Jayachitra
- Roja Ramani
- Manorama
- S. V. Subbaiah
- S. A. Ashokan
- Senthamarai
- Kaka Radhakrishnan
- Tambaram Lalitha

== Soundtrack ==
The music was composed by M. S. Viswanathan, with lyrics by Vaali.

Track listing
| No. | Title | Singer(s) | Length |
|---|---|---|---|
| 1. | "Oru Nadagam Nadakkuthu" | T. M. Soundararajan |
| 2. | "Ooraithirutha Oru Pillai" | Sirkazhi Govindarajan, Kovai Soundararajan, Vani Jairam, Chorus |
| 3. | "Paduthaal Purandaal" | S. P. Balasubrahmanyam, Ramola |
| 4. | "Oru Pakkam Neruppu" | L. R. Eswari |
| 5. | "Medaiyil Aadidum" | S. P. Balasubrahmanyam, Vani Jairam |

== Release and reception ==
Vandikkaran Magan was released on 30 October 1978. Ki. Rajendran of Kalki appreciated the film for the cinematography, direction and cast performances. He also appreciated the lack of a comedy subplot, and was delighted to see Manorama in a different kind of role. Ananda Vikatan wrote that though the story was old fashioned, it tasted delicious because of the story incidents and political references, rating the film 51 out of 100. The film was a major success.
