= Vartha =

1986 film directed by I. V. Sasi

- Poster
- Directed by: I. V. Sasi
- Written by: T. Damodaran
- Produced by: P. V. Gangadharan
- Starring: Mammootty; Mohanlal; Rahman; Seema; Venu Nagavally; K. P. A. C. Lalitha; Prathapachandran
- Cinematography: Jayanan Vincent
- Edited by: K. Narayanan
- Music by: A. T. Ummer
- Production company: Grihalakshmi Productions
- Release date: 28 February 1986
- Running time: 163 minutes
- Country: India
- Language: Malayalam

Vartha (transl. News) is a 1986 Indian Malayalam-language film, directed by I. V. Sasi and produced by P. V. Gangadharan. The film stars Mammootty, Mohanlal, Rahman, Seema, Venu Nagavally, K. P. A. C. Lalitha and Prathapachandran. The film has musical score by A. T. Ummer. It was successful at the box office. The film was remade in Tamil as Palaivana Rojakkal (1986), in Kannada as Kurukshetra (1987) and in Hindi as Jai Shiv Shankar (1990), which was never released.

== Plot ==
Madhavankutty is a journalist who fights against the corrupted government system. His father is Keshavan Nair and his mother is Kunjulaksmi. Unnikrishnan is a violent college student constantly vandalizing college property and he has animosity towards his elder sister Radha Menon who is an IAS Officer. They have a younger sister named Vasanthi. One night, Unnikrishnan and his gang throw stones at Madhavnkutty's house and Radha slaps him after hearing about it. She demands Unnikrishhan apologize to Madhavankutty which he reluctantly does the next day. Vasu known as 'Parol Vasu' is a goon working for Manikyam the corrupt businessman. Hamsa is Vasu's aide who is with him always. Vasanthi proposes to marry Madhavankutty but is declinded as he loved Radha One night and another, Vasu and his goons attacks Madhavankutty. Vasu and Unnikrishnan are friends and eventually Vasanthi starts liking Vasu and she eventually becomes Vasu's wife. Vasu tells Vasanthi about his past on how his mother was in a mental asylum and that his father was in central jail who is now bed ridden and how Vasu grew up in an orphanage and how he became a goon. Madhavankutty offers Vasu a job which the latter refuses at first because of his initial bitterness but he then changes his mind and becomes Madhavnkutty's right hand man. One night, Hamsa is killed by Inspector Francis. Upon hearing this, Vasu goes to beat him and is about to kill him but is stopped by Madhavnkutty who tells Vasu to let the court punish him. In the climax, Madhavankutty and Vasu are shot dead by unknown shooters which leaves Unnikrishnan, Radha and Vasanthi devastated. The film ends with a newspaper citing the investigation of their deaths.

== Cast ==
- Mammootty as Madhavan Kutty, an upright journalist
- Mohanlal as Parol Vasu, a violent hired goon with a troubled past
- Rahman as Unnikrishnan, a violent college student and younger brother of Radha and Vasanthi
- Seema as Radha Menon, a strict IAS Officer
- Nalini as Vasanthi, Radha's younger sister
- Venu Nagavally as Devan
- Prathapachandran as Nambeeshan
- Devan as Revenue Minister Philip
- T. G. Ravi as Manikyam Kumar, the main antagonist and a corrupt businessman
- Janardhanan as James
- K. P. A. C. Lalitha as Kunjulakshmi
- Manavalan Joseph as Constable
- Jagannatha Varma as Kurup
- Babu Namboothiri as Venu
- Thikkurissy Sukumaran Nair as Keshavan Nair
- K. P. A. C. Sunny as Ajmal, Enforcement Officer
- K. P. A. C. Azeez as Gafoor Ali, City Police Commissioner
- Balan K. Nair as Harishankar, Forest Minister
- Kuthiravattam Pappu as Hamsa, Vasu's aide
- Kundara Johny as Francis
- Paravoor Bharathan as Bharathan
- Kunjandi as Pachu Pillai
- Nellikode Bhaskaran as Radha's Relative
- Sonia as Young Radha
- Santhakumari as Ammukutty
- K. T. C. Abdullah as Abu
- Baskara Kurup as Hajyar
- V. Ramachandran as Engineer Sahadevan

== Themes ==
Sreedhar Pillai wrote for India Today, "Vartha had overtly political themes, parodying events and politicians in a manner that left little to the imagination. I. V. Sasi told him, "I always have a rough commercial framework for my political films, Then I look around and talk to a lot of people about current political happenings. These, when mixed in the right proportion can give you an instant hit."

== Release ==
The film was released on 12 February 1986. It was a commercial success, running for 150 days in theatres. The film was the third highest grossing Malayalam film of 1986.

== Soundtrack ==
The music was composed by A. T. Ummer and the lyrics were written by Bichu Thirumala.

Song	Singers
"Innalekal"	K. J. Yesudas
"Salilam Sruthisaagaram"	K. J. Yesudas, Ashalatha

== Awards ==
- Filmfare Award for Best Film - Malayalam won by P. V. Gangadharan (1986)
