= Sun TV (India) =

Indian television channel

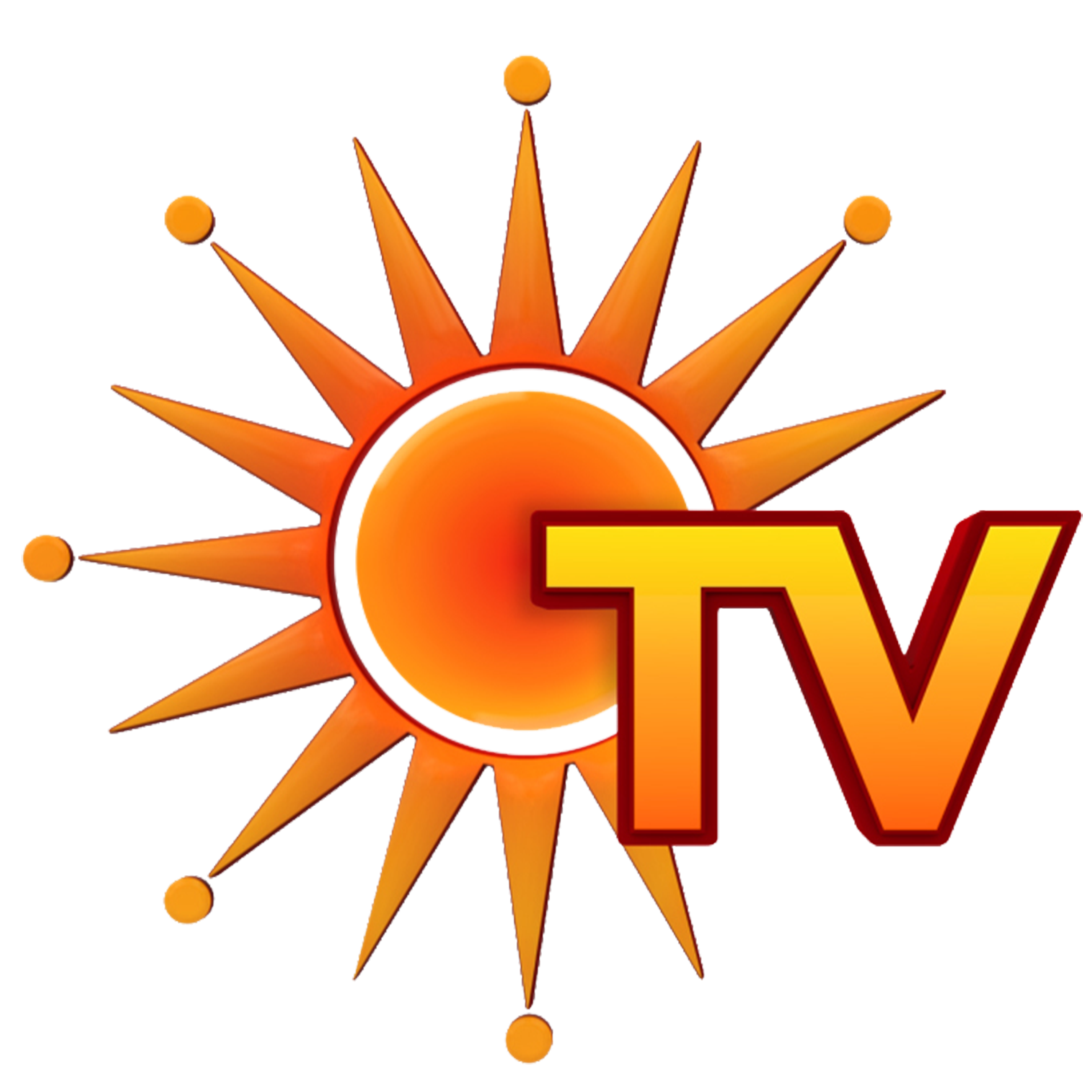
- Logo used since 2026
- Country: India
- Broadcast area: Worldwide
- Network: Sun TV Network
- Headquarters: Chennai, Tamil Nadu, India

Programming
- Language: Tamil
- Picture format: 1080p HDTV

Ownership
- Owner: Sun Group
- Sister channels: Sun TV Network (Channels)

History
- Launched: 14 April 1993; 33 years ago

Links
- Website: Sun TV

Availability

Terrestrial
- (Malaysia) Astro: Channel 211 (HD)
- (Malaysia) NJOI: Channel 211 (HD)
- (Myanmar) Sky Net: Channel 26 (SD)

Streaming media
- Sun NXT (India): Sun TV
- (Malaysia) Astro: Astro Go

Sun TV is an Indian Tamil-language general entertainment pay television channel owned by Sun TV Network. It was launched on 14 April 1993. It is the flagship channel of the Chennai-based media conglomerate Sun Group's Sun TV Network. It was founded and is owned by Kalanithi Maran.

It started airing on open network (Antenna) on 14 July 2002 at the time of "Majunu" Tamil movie premiering. Then it was removed from this open network on 2005. It was also removed from free on 9 November 2007. Sun TV launched its HD version on 11 December 2011.

Since its inception, the channel consistently remains the top rated Tamil channel and one of the top rated Indian television channel.

On 2 October 2025, the entire Sun TV network, including Sun TV itself, has officially renewed their channel logo for the first time in over three decades of operations. The new logo was later appeared on 1 February 2026.

In Sri Lanka, Sun Network channels have faced distribution changes on pay-television platforms. Sun TV and Sun Music were reportedly removed from SLT-Mobitel's PEO TV service around 2022. On 1 July 2025, Dialog Television reportedly discontinued Sun TV, KTV and Sun Music from its channel lineup. These changes affected subscribers who relied on local pay-TV services to watch Sun Network programming.

== History ==
Kalanithi Maran has been interested in television since his trip to the United States where he did an MBA at the University of Scranton in the mid-1980s. At the time, Doordarshan controlled the entirety of India's television landscape. Upon returning, he had plans to set up a television channel, but the plans were thwarted by the ongoing monopoly and the lack of liberalisation of the sector.

Sun TV is the flagship channel of Sun TV Network which started on the Tamil New Year, 14 April 1993.

It started off with a four and a half hour programming per day on a time sharing agreement with ATN, India's first independent television channel, having rejected a proposal for an afternoon slot on Zee TV. In January 1997, it started 24-hour broadcasts.

In 1995, it signed an agreement with ST Teleport in Singapore to provide uplink. Singapore Cable Vision added the channel on 1 October 1996.

Sun TV went to become one of the most profitable television channels in India, considering that, as late as 2009, one third of households in India with television sets were in Tamil Nadu and adjacent states. Sun TV was listed on the Bombay Stock Exchange on 24 April 2006 upon raising $133 million. It is the most viewed Tamil television channel in the world with syndicated broadcasts in several countries such as the United States, United Arab Emirates, Singapore, Malaysia, Sri Lanka, Australia, Canada, South Africa, Qatar, Hong Kong, Europe (United Kingdom, France, Germany, Italy, Denmark, Austria, Switzerland, Netherlands and Ireland) and other countries. In October 2009, Sun TV's network of channels had a sum of 21 programmes among the 100 most watched; more than 16 shows came from the Zee network.

Network18 Group has 50% dealing distribution with Sun TV Network, which led them to make Sun18. In July 2010, with the creation of Sun18, Sun TV Network became responsible for the South Indian market, while Network18 was responsible for the North Indian market.

== Scandal ==
On 8 December 2013, the Little India Riot broke out at Singapore. On 9 December 2013, Sun TV made a false news report on the riot saying that the deceased was pushed out of the bus by the driver, as well as attacked by locals. Lim Thuan Kuan, Singapore's High Commissioner to India, protest against the false report. As a result, Sun TV issued a correction the following day and apologized for the error.

== Awards ==
Sun TV also hosts numerous film-industry–related events in Tamil Nadu and the Sun Kudumbam Awards ceremony biannually.

== Sister channels ==
=== KTV ===
KTV is an Indian Tamil language movie pay television channel owned by Sun TV Network, broadcasting Tamil language films. It was launched on 22 October 2001. Channel 216

=== Sun Music ===
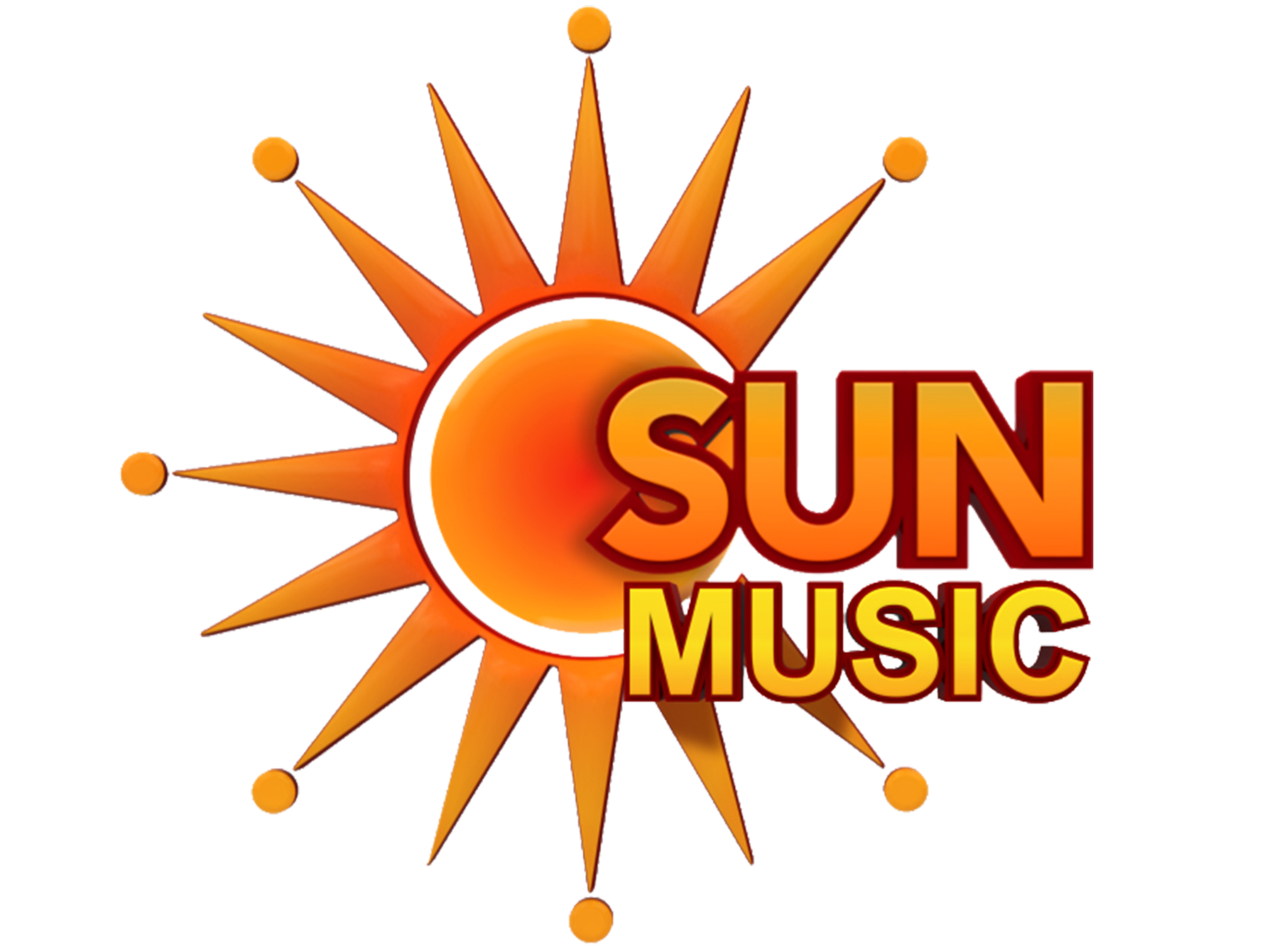
Logo used since 2026

Sun Music is India's first Tamil language music pay television channel owned by Sun TV Network. It was launched on 5 September 2004. Its HD counterpart was launched on 11 December 2011. Channel 212

=== Sun News ===
Sun News is an Indian Tamil language news pay television channel owned by Sun TV Network, headquartered at Chennai, Tamil Nadu. It was launched in May 2000. Channel 215

=== Chutti TV ===
Chutti TV is an Indian Tamil language kids pay television channel from the Sun TV Network in India. The target audience are children aged between 3 - 10. It was launched on 29 April 2007 & Defunct in 13 October 2022, making it Sun TV Network's first ever television channel for kids. Channel 213

=== Adithya TV ===
Adithya TV is a channel dedicated to comedy. It mainly airs comedy segments from Tamil films. Channel 214
