= Ajay Singh (entrepreneur) =

Indian businessman and sports administrator

- Born: 29 December 1965 (age 60); New Delhi
- Other name: Ajay Singh
- Education: Indian Institute of Technology Delhi; Cornell University; University of Delhi
- Occupation: Businessman

Ajay Singh (born 29 December 1965) is an Indian businessman, sports administrator, bureaucrat, politician and investor. He is the principal shareholder, chairman, and managing director of SpiceJet, a low-cost airline with headquarters in Gurugram, Haryana.

He co-founded SpiceJet in 2005 and has had two stints at its helm.

== Early life and education ==
Ajay Singh was born and brought up in Central Delhi. He went to school at St. Columba's School, Delhi, where he captained the cricket and hockey teams.

Singh went to the Indian Institute of Technology Delhi, where he received a degree in engineering, and got his Master's degree in Business Administration (MBA) from Cornell University in the United States. Singh also holds a Bachelor's degree in Law (LL.B) from Law Faculty, University of Delhi.

== Career ==
=== Aviation ===
==== SpiceJet ====
Ajay Singh co-founded SpiceJet in 2005 with the objective of making flying affordable for all Indians. After a successful stint, he exited the airline in 2010. Five years later, he bought back the airline at a time when it was on the verge of closing down.

Under Singh's leadership, SpiceJet registered a growth in profitability. Since taking over in 2015, the airline has reported 18 quarters of profit and the highest passenger load factor (occupancy) for over five consecutive years. SpiceJet also has one of the best on-time performances among all airlines in India as well as one of the lowest cancellation rates. The airline's stock was the world's best performing aviation stock in 2017 as per Bloomberg.

Under his leadership, SpiceJet placed an order of 205 Boeing aircraft – one of the largest in the American company's history. The mega order was acknowledged by the then US President Donald Trump who said it would help create tens of thousands of jobs in the United States. SpiceJet followed up the Boeing order with 50 Bombardier Q400 planes – the single-biggest order for the aircraft in Bombardier's history.

==== Other ventures ====
In April 2022, Singh entered the healthcare technology sector by co-founding flebo, an online diagnostic and home health-test aggregator. The platform launched its services across the National Capital Region (Delhi, Gurugram, and Noida) to facilitate home sample collection partnering with accredited diagnostic laboratories, and subsequently expanded its offerings to include digital health record management.

==== Other positions ====
Ajay Singh is currently the President of ASSOCHAM, one of leading trade and commerce organizations of India. In January 2019, he became the first Indian to chair the Aviation, Travel and Tourism (ATT) Governor's Meeting at the World Economic Forum, Davos. In June 2019, he was nominated to the Board of Governors of International Air Transport Association. He is the Chairman of the CII National Committee on Civil Aviation. He is also the Chairman of the World Travel and Tourism Council, India Initiative.

=== Sports administration ===
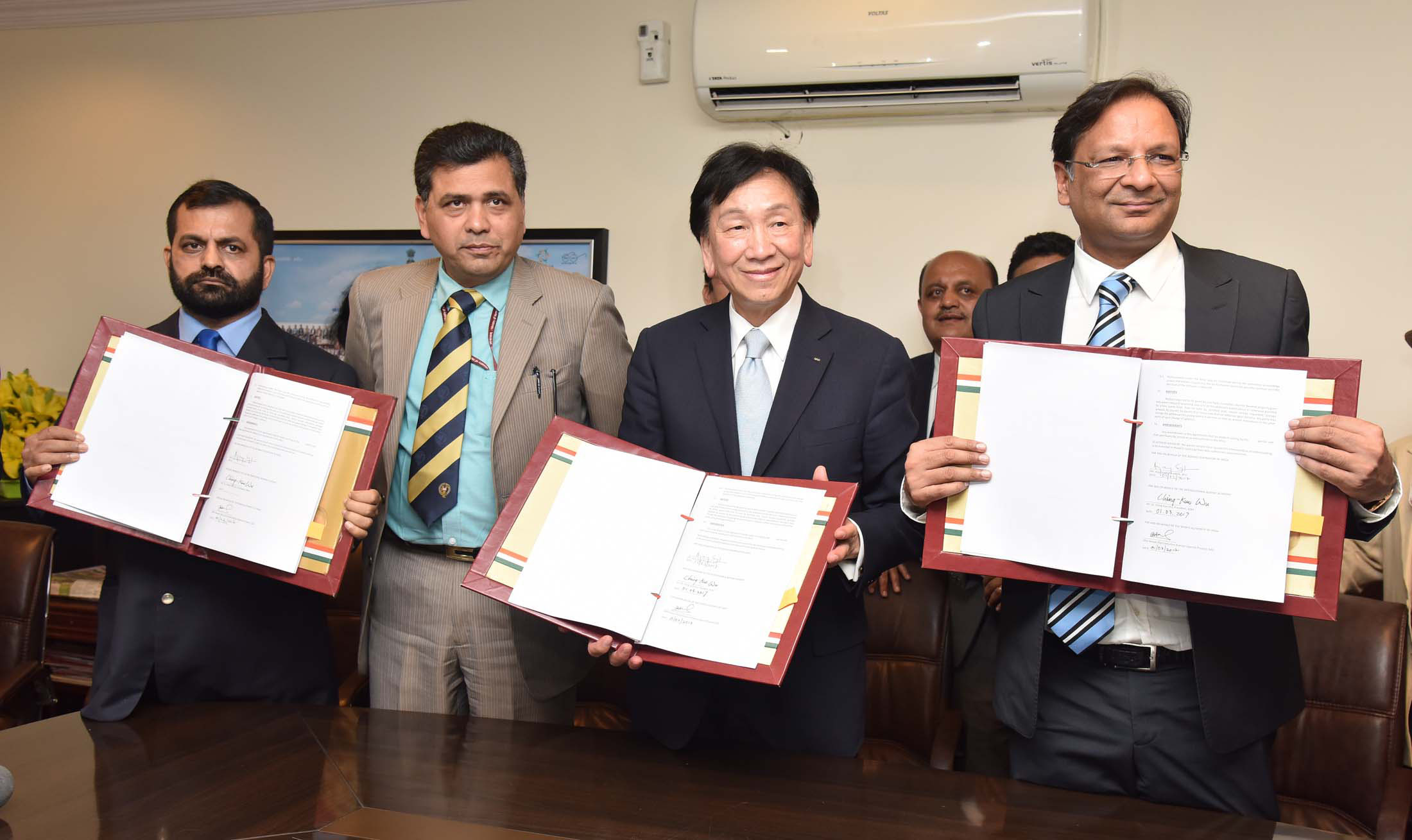
Ajay Singh (right) with AIBA President Wu Ching-kuo in New Delhi, India, 1 March 2017

A keen sports person, Singh is the President of the Boxing Federation of India (BFI) and the Vice President of the International Boxing Association (IBA).

He was elected the President of BFI on 25 September 2016 and then once again in the year 2021.

=== Bureaucracy ===
He was responsible for the turnaround of the loss-making Delhi Transport Corporation (DTC) and the national television broadcast network, Doordarshan. In 1996, he served on the Board of DTC and unveiled a strategic plan to revamp the public transport operator, resulting in its spectacular revival in less than three years. He also overhauled Doordarshan and played a key role in the launch of two major channels, DD Sports and DD News.

Singh was also advisor to the Ministry of Telecommunications and Information Technology, where he helped draft the National Telecom Policy and Information Technology Act. He played a key role in reducing the cost of mobile calls and revolutionising the telecom and IT industries in India.

=== Politics ===
==== General Elections 2004 and 2014 ====
He managed the publicity campaign of the Bharatiya Janata Party's 2004 and 2014 general election campaigns. He is credited with coining the famous slogan Abki Baar Modi Sarkar, which means "Now is the time for Modi government", during the 2014 election campaign. He has often been referred to as "Chhota Ambani or Chhota Adani of Narendra Modi for being privileged under Modi's political clout. Despite his business success, he is often considered as BJP's right-hand man and go to for political advertisements. His affiliation with the BJP and extraordinary business acumen has helped the company grow in the years.

== Honours and recognitions ==
- In 2018, he received US-India Strategic Partnership Forum's Leadership Award.
- In 2017, he received EY's Indian Entrepreneur of the Year award, in the Business Transformation category.
- In 2018, he received the CAPA Chairman's Order of Merit for Excellence in Indian Aviation Award for his contribution towards Indian aviation and the remarkable turnaround and financial performance of SpiceJet.
