= SpiceJet =

Indian low-cost airline

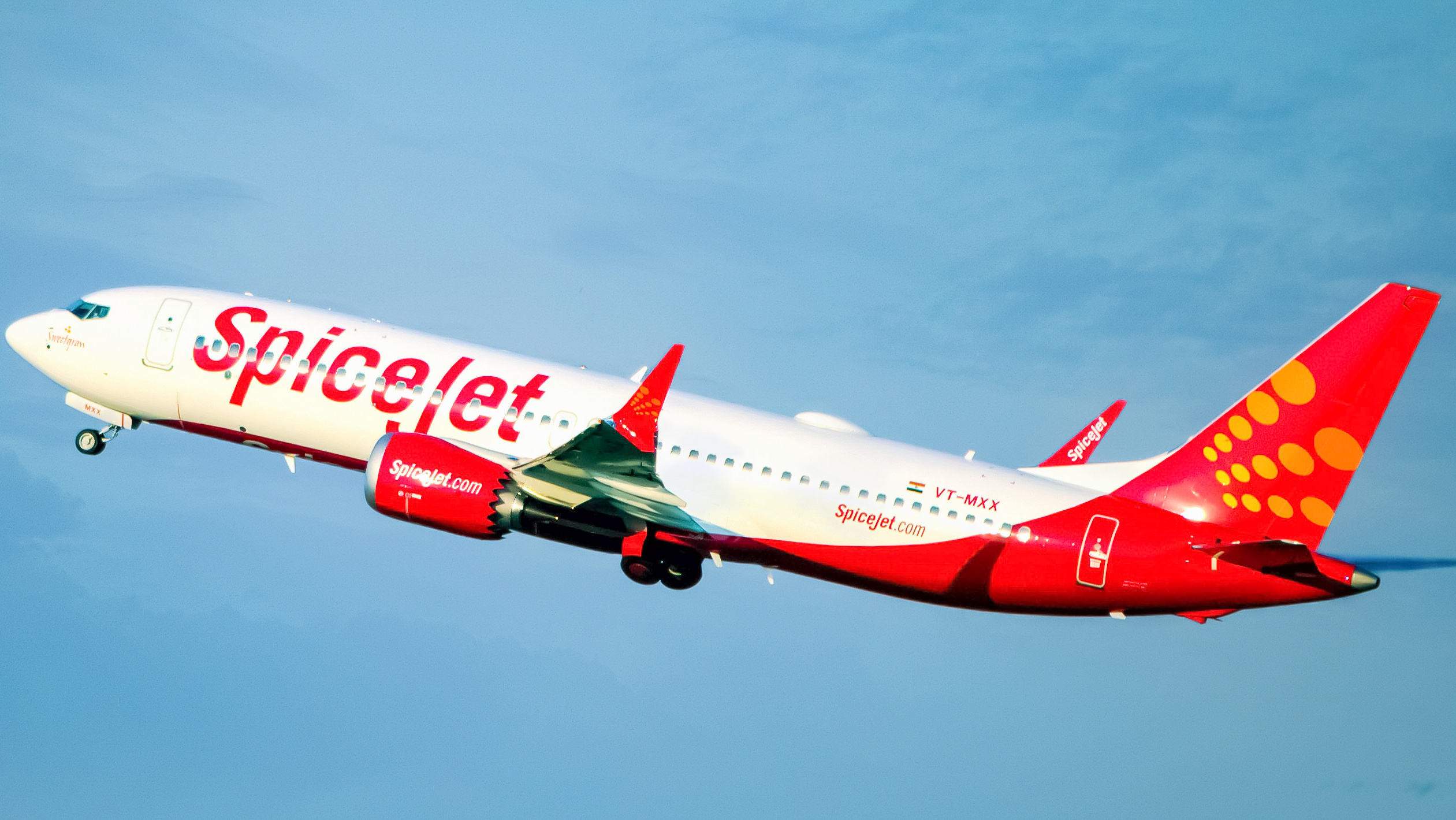
- SpiceJet Boeing 737 MAX 8
IATA	ICAO	Call sign
SG	SEJ	SPICEJET
- Founded: 1994; 32 years ago (as ModiLuft); 2004; 22 years ago (as SpiceJet)
- Commenced operations: 24 May 2005; 21 years ago
- Operating bases: Delhi; Hyderabad
- Subsidiaries: SpiceXpress
- Fleet size: 54
- Destinations: 35
- Traded as: BSE: 500285; NSE: SPICEJET
- ISIN: INE285B01017
- Headquarters: Gurgaon, Haryana, India
- Key people: Ajay Singh (chairman and MD); Sanjeev Taneja (CFO); Debojo Maharshi (CBO)
- Revenue: ▼₹8,524 crore (US$910 million) (2024)
- Operating income: ▼₹−423 crore (US$−45 million) (2024)
- Net income: ▼₹−423 crore (US$−45 million) (2024)
- Total assets: ▼₹6,472 crore (US$690 million) (2024)
- Total equity: ▼₹−5,218 crore (US$−560 million) (2024)
- Employees: 6,484 (2025)
- Website: www.spicejet.com

SpiceJet is an Indian low-cost airline headquartered in Gurgaon, Haryana. As of May 2025, it is the fourth largest airline in India by number of domestic passengers carried, with a market share of 4%.

Established as air taxi provider ModiLuft in 1994, the company was acquired by Indian entrepreneur Ajay Singh in 2004 and renamed SpiceJet. The airline operated its first flight in May 2005. Indian media baron Kalanidhi Maran acquired a controlling stake in SpiceJet in June 2010 through Sun Group which was sold back to Ajay Singh in January 2015. The airline operates a fleet of Boeing 737 and Bombardier Dash 8 aircraft.

== History ==
=== 1984–1996: ModiLuft era ===
The origins of SpiceJet can be tracked back to March 1984 when the company was established by Indian industrialist Satish Kumar Modi to provide private air taxi services. On 17 February 1993, the company was named as MG Express and entered into technical partnership with the German flag carrier Lufthansa. The airline provided passenger and cargo services under the name of ModiLuft before ceasing operations in 1996.

=== 2005–2013: Inception and expansion ===
In 2004, the company was acquired by Ajay Singh and the airline planned to restart operations as SpiceJet following the low-cost model. SpiceJet leased two Boeing 737-800 aircraft in 2005 and planned to order ten new aircraft for expansion. SpiceJet opened bookings on 18 May 2005 and the first flight was operated between Delhi and Mumbai on 24 May 2005. By July 2008, it was India's third-largest low-cost carrier in terms of market share after Air Deccan and IndiGo. Indian media baron Kalanithi Maran acquired 37.7% stake in SpiceJet in June 2010 through Sun Group. The airline ordered 30 Boeing 737-8 aircraft worth US$2.7 billion July 2010 and a further 15 Bombardier Q4 Dash short-haul aircraft worth US$446 million in December 2010.

In 2012, SpiceJet suffered a loss of over ₹39 crore (US$4.2 million) owing to increase in global crude prices. On 9 January 2012, the Directorate General of Civil Aviation (DGCA), reported that several airlines in India, including SpiceJet, have not maintained crucial data for the flight operations quality assurance. The Bombay Stock Exchange announced that ever since June 2011, SpiceJet had been suffering losses. In 2012, Kalanidhi Maran increased his stake in the airline by investing ₹100 crore (US$11 million) in the airline. The airline returned to profits at the end of the same year. SpiceJet entered into an inter airline pact with Tigerair on 16 December 2013 which was scrapped in January 2015.

=== 2014–2019: Downturn and recovery ===
In January 2015, the Sun Group sold its entire shareholding and transferred control to Ajay Singh. In September 2017, the airline placed an order for 25 Q400 turboprop aircraft. In 2019, SpiceJet took over 30 aircraft that were grounded by Jet Airways. The airline achieved a market share of 14.9% in 2019.

=== 2020–present: Fleet groundings, COVID-19 and bankruptcy ===
The airline posted net losses of US$34.6 million during the fiscal quarter ended 31 March 2021, as revenue fell by 28% annually to $294.8 million. The airline planned to raise funds to the tune of $337.2 million to ensure its long term sustainability. In May 2022, Directorate General of Civil Aviation started a safety investigation into the company's aircraft following a series of incidents involving malfunctioning plane equipment. In July 2022, DGCA imposed restrictions on the number of flights to be capped at 50% of the existent flights with strict monitoring. As of June 2024, it is the sixth largest airline in India by number of domestic passengers carried, with a market share of 4%.

On 12 September 2024, SpiceJet announced that its shareholders approved a fund raising initiative of ₹3,000 crore (equivalent to ₹32 billion or US$340 million in 2026) through Qualified Institutional Placement (QIP) shares in order to pay pending dues amid financial challenges, legal battles and grounding of aircraft. The airline's downturn and requirement of funds was due to two consecutive events — Boeing 737 MAX groundings and the COVID-19 pandemic. However, the funds had been realised and the airline plans to return to the market with full capacity and fleet expansion. The airline would clear a debt of ₹750 crore (equivalent to ₹799 crore or US$85 million in 2026) to the lessors with the newly acquired funds. On 5 October, it was reported that the airline cleared the four-month due salaries and GST and deposited 10-months dues of Provident Fund (PF). SpiceJet was also scheduled to receive ₹736 crore (equivalent to ₹784 crore or US$84 million in 2026) from a previous funding round in October 2024.

By September 2026, the market share of the airline plummeted to 0.6%. An additional fundraising plan for ₹5,500 crore (US$590 million) was cleared by the airline board on 18 November 2026. The board also approved a proposal to increase the company's authorised share capital from ₹2,000 crore (US$210 million) to ₹7,500 crore (US$800 million). The airline attributed the financial strain to geopolitical disruptions, a sharp rise in aviation turbine fuel (ATF) prices and airspace restrictions. Meanwhile, the airline operation dropped significantly in the month while operating with a fleet of 10 aircraft. Business Standard reported that around 74% flights of the airline were cancelled from India's top three airports. DGCA has also issued a show cause notice to the airline due to alleged Route Dispersal Guidelines (RDG) non-compliance on 17 November with seven days to respond. The airline is operating only around 15 flights of its 66 daily flights approved by DGCA. Several insolvency petitions has also been filed against the airline by lessors, including former promotors Kalanithi Maran and KAL Airways.

== Corporate affairs ==
=== Business trends ===
The key trends for SpiceJet are (as of the financial year ending 31 March):

	Revenue (₹crores)	Net profit (₹crores)	Number of employees	Number of passengers (m)	Passenger load factor (%)	Fleet size	References
2014	6,304	−1,003	5,639	13	72	58	
2015	5,201	−687	4,185	12	81	34	
2016	5,088	450	5,360	12	91	42	
2017	6,191	427	6,902	15	92	49	
2018	7,760	557	8,447	18	95	60	
2019	9,121	−302	8,556	19.9	93	76	
2020	12,375	−937	11,675	24.7	92	114	
2021	5,171	−1,030	14,578	7.7	77	98	
2022	6,604	−1,744	12,000	9.1	80	88	
2023	8,874	−1,513	10,060	12.7	87	76	
2024		−409	8,165	9.7	90	65	
2025		58.1	6,484	6.9	88	61	

=== Ownership and structure ===
The company is publicly traded under NSE: SPICEJET, with a market capitalization of about ₹4,255 crore (US$450 million) as of January 2024. On 30 March 2020, HDFC bought 3.4 crore shares of SpiceJet from the open market constituting 5.45% stake.

=== Headquarters ===
SpiceJet is headquartered in Gurgaon, India. Ajay Singh serves as the managing director of the airline since January 2015. The airline's logo consists of 15 dots arranged in three rows of five each in the order of their reducing sizes on a red background. In June 2015, the airline unveiled its current logo with a new tagline Red. Hot. Spicy. SpiceJet names all its aircraft with the name of an Indian spice.

=== Subsidiaries ===
Launched in September 2018, SpiceXpress is the air cargo division of the airline. The airline took delivery of its first 737-800 Boeing Converted Freighter (BCF) in September 2019, becoming the first South Asian carrier to induct the converted freighter into its fleet.

Spice Shuttle was a fully owned subsidiary of SpiceJet which operated sea planes and other shuttle airplane services. The airline initiated its service on 31 October 2020 with a fleet consisting of a 15-seater DHC-6-300. The flight operated between Sabarmati Riverfront, Ahmedabad and Statue of Unity, Kevadia. This route was inaugurated under the UDAN scheme. SpiceJet had conducted seaplane trials in India in phase I (Nagpur, Guwahati) and phase II (Girgaon Chowpatty, Mumbai) since 2017. However, it terminated services in April 2021.

== Destinations ==
SpiceJet operates hubs at Delhi and Hyderabad, which is the primary base for its fleet of Bombardier Q400 aircraft. After completing five years of flying, SpiceJet was allowed to commence international flights by Directorate General of Civil Aviation on 7 September 2010. SpiceJet launched flights from Delhi to Kathmandu and Chennai to Colombo and the first international flight took off on 7 October 2010 from Delhi.

=== Codeshare agreements ===
SpiceJet has codeshare agreements with the following airlines:

- Emirates
- Gulf Air

== Fleet ==
=== Current fleet ===
As of July 2026, SpiceJet operates the following aircraft:

SpiceJet fleet
Aircraft	In service	Orders	Passengers	Notes
Boeing 737-700	2	—	144	
Boeing 737-700	3	—	149	
Boeing 737-800	12	—	189	Older aircraft to be retired.
Boeing 737-900ER	3	—	212	
Boeing 737 MAX 8	7	129	189	To replace older Boeing 737-800. Order with 50 options.
De Havilland Canada Dash 8-400	24	—	78	
SpiceXpress Cargo fleet
Boeing 737-700BDSF	3	—	Cargo	Launch customer of its type in India
Total	54	129		

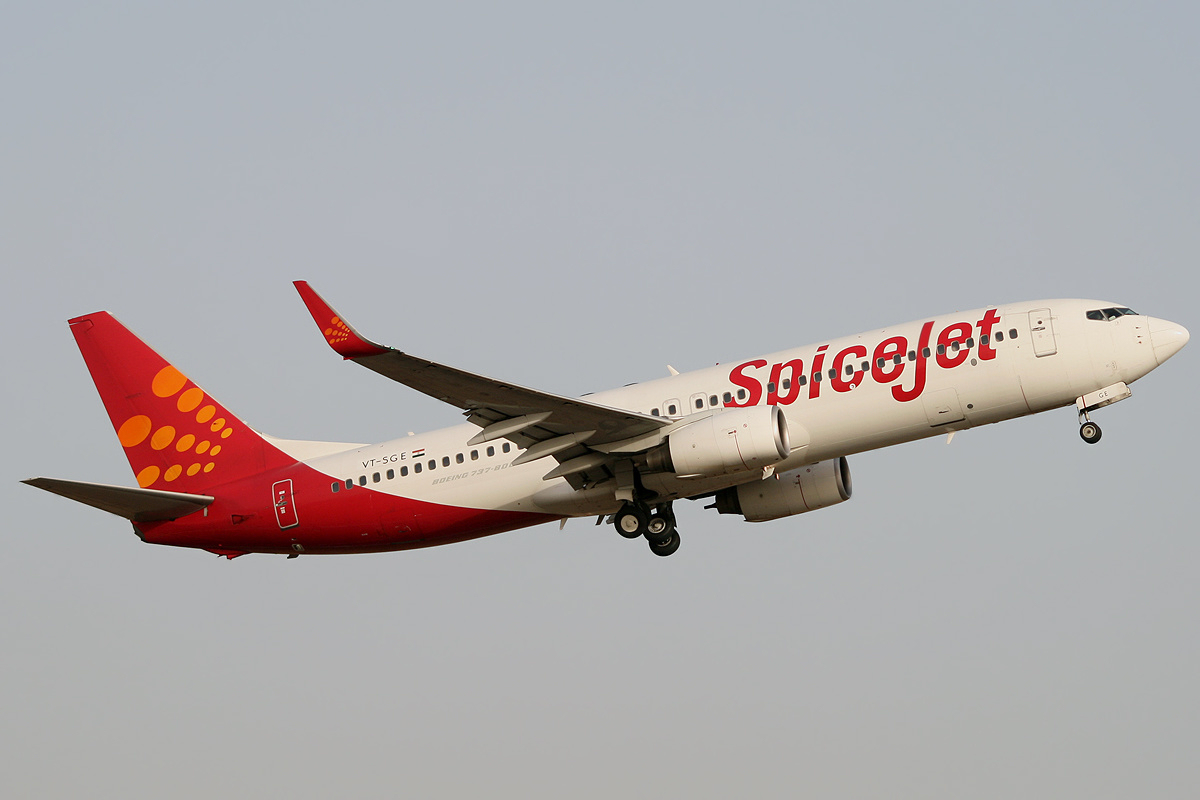
Boeing 737-800

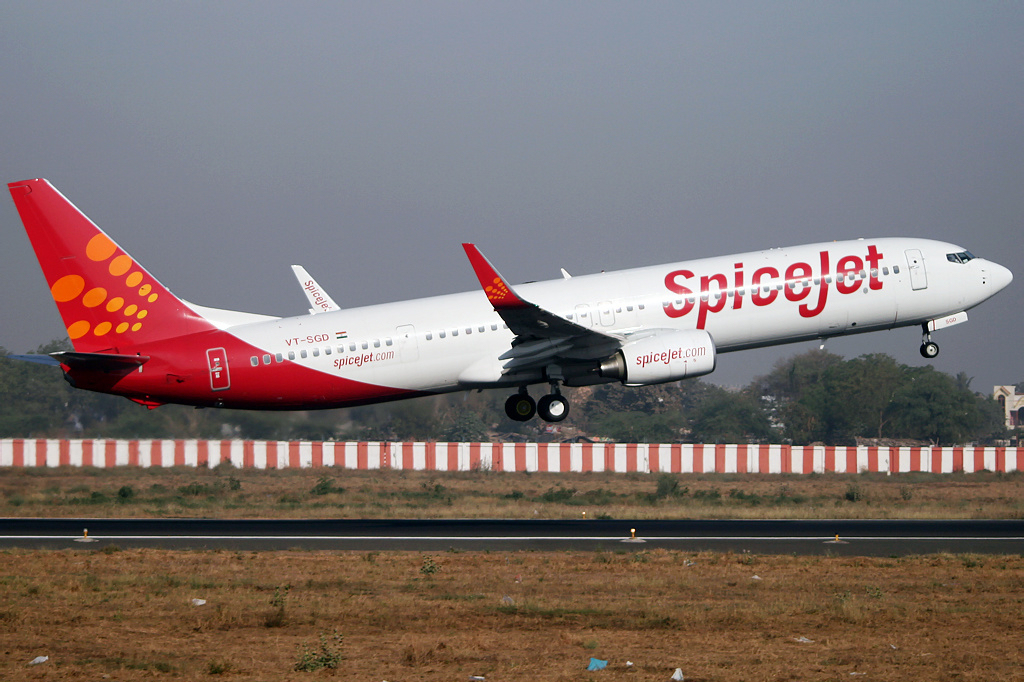
Boeing 737-900ER

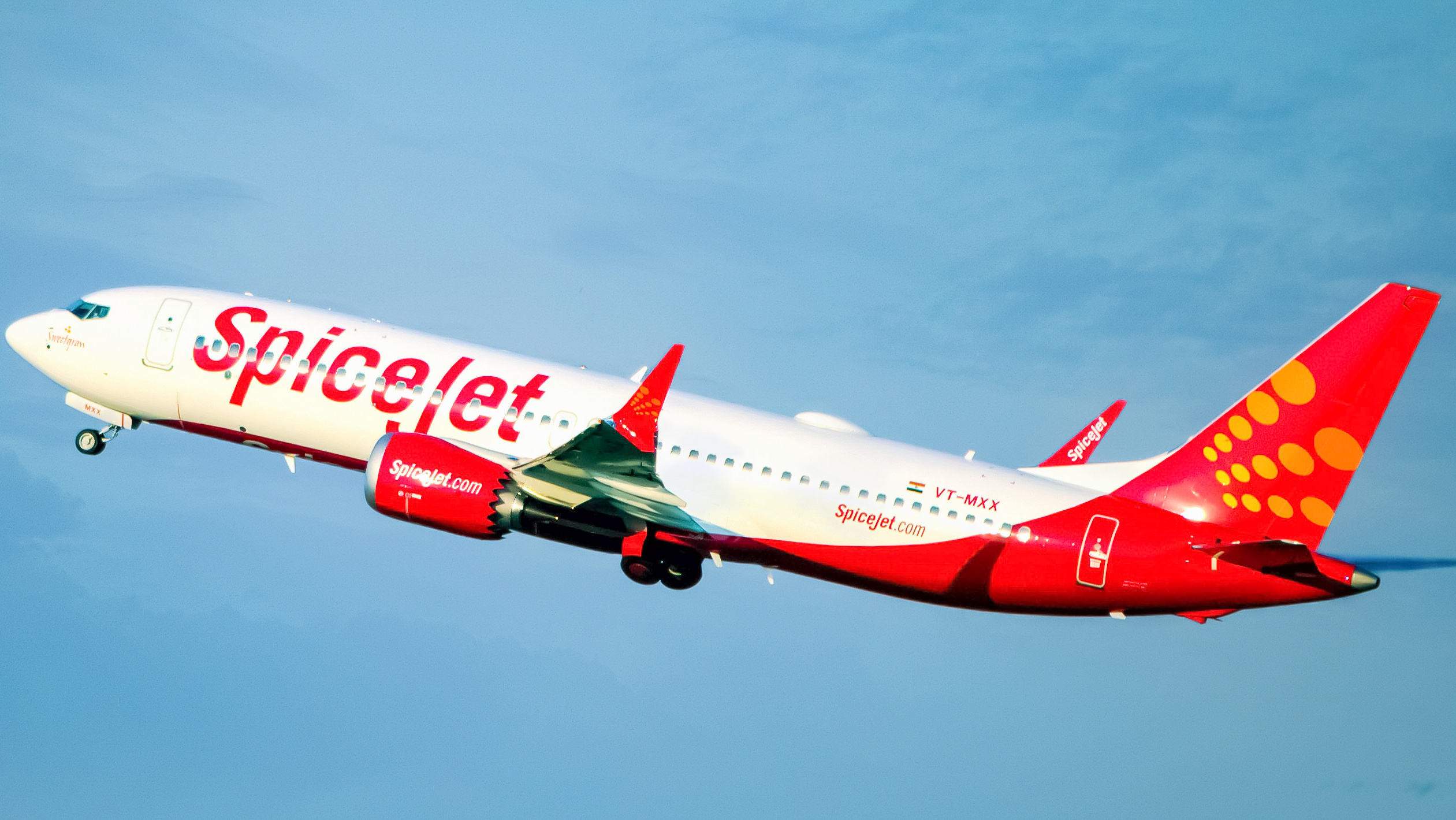
Boeing 737 MAX 8

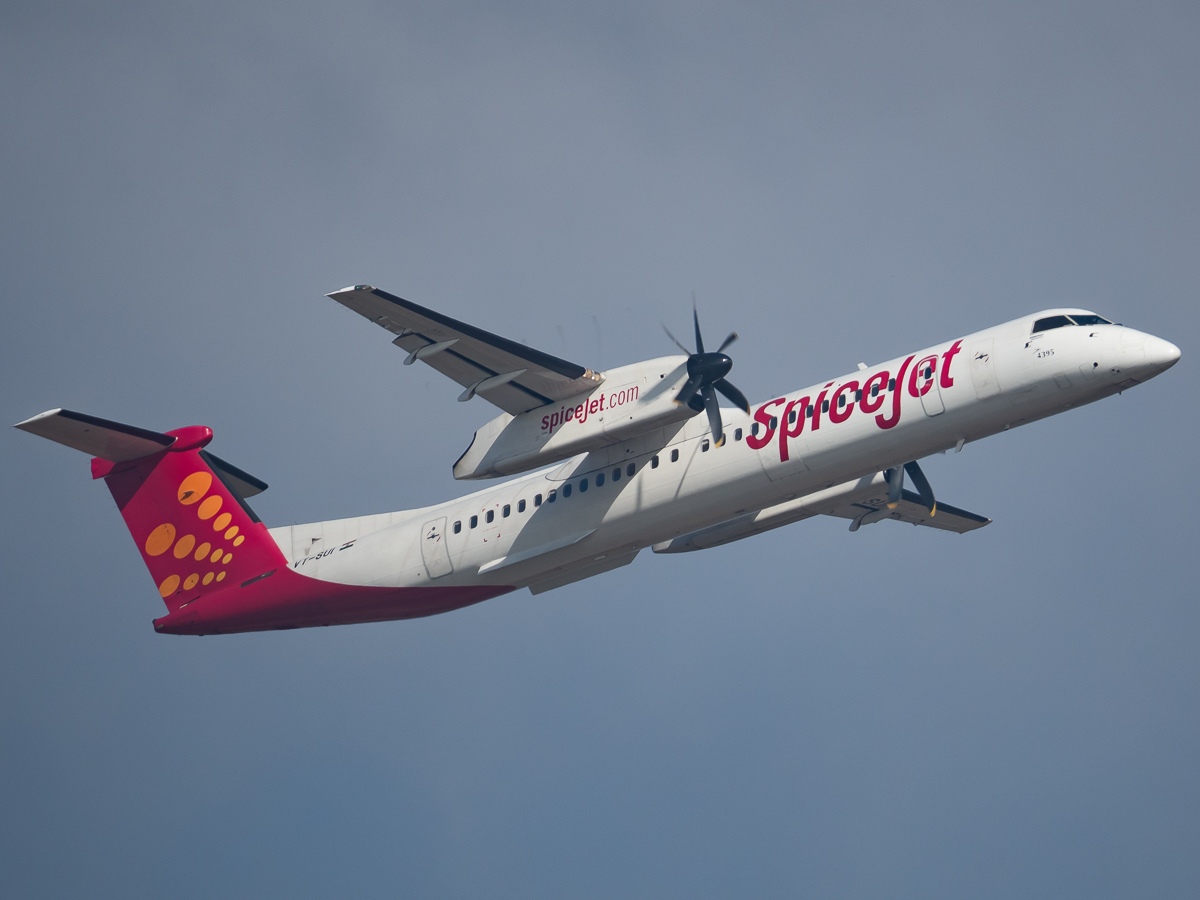
De Havilland Canada Dash 8-400

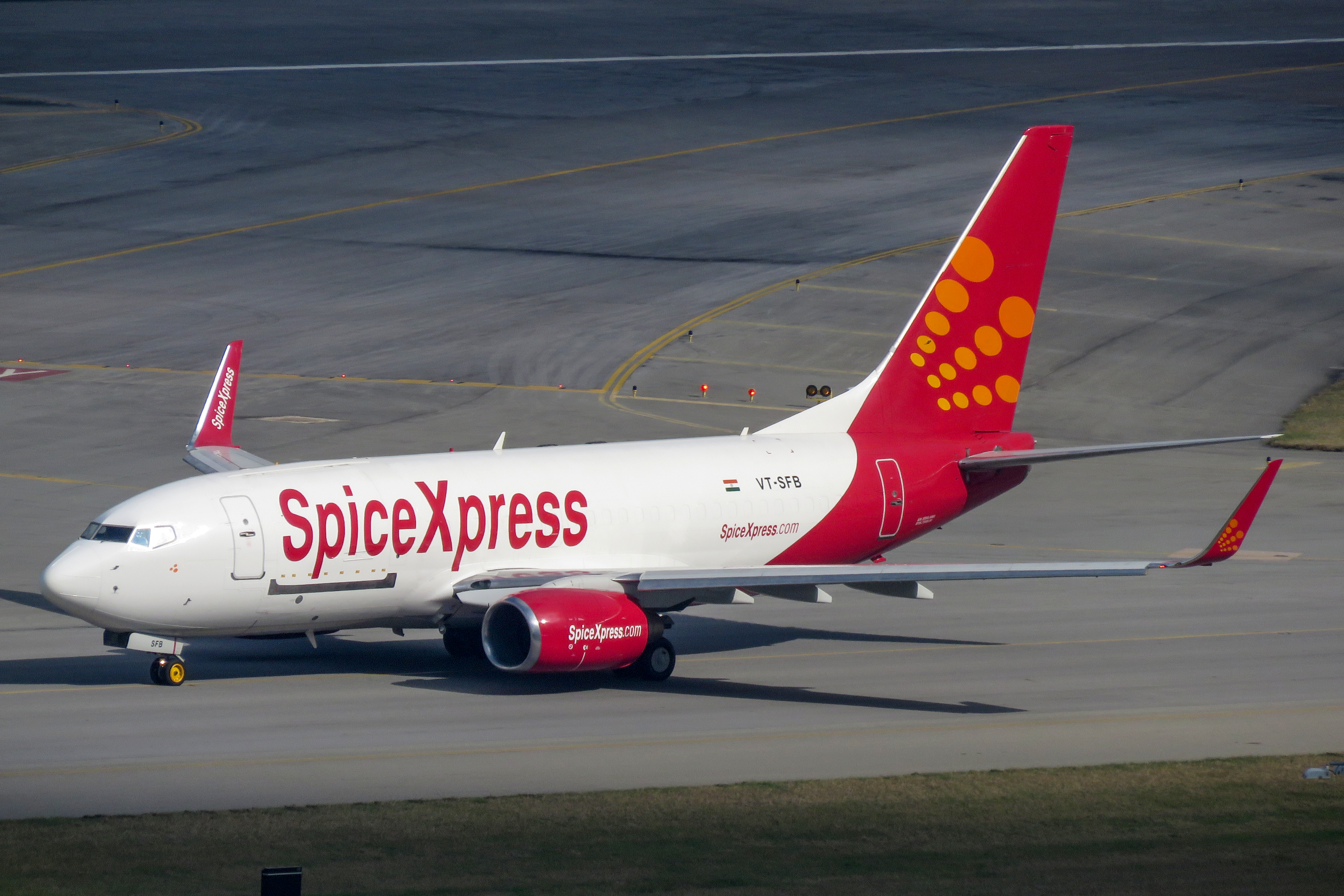
Boeing 737-700BCF

=== Fleet development ===
SpiceJet placed its first firm order for 20 Next-Generation Boeing 737-800s in March 2005, with deliveries scheduled up to 2010. In November 2010, the airline ordered 30 Boeing 737-800s. On 9 December 2010, Bombardier Aerospace announced that SpiceJet had placed a firm order for fifteen Q400 NextGen turboprop airliners with options for another fifteen. SpiceJet used its fleet of Q400s for short-haul operations.

In March 2014, the airline signed a US$4.4 billion deal with Boeing for the procurement of 42 737 MAX 8 aircraft. In 2015, SpiceJet was in talks with both Boeing and Airbus for a possible order of more than 100 single aisle aircraft, either Airbus A320neo or the Boeing 737 MAX with the same being confirmed by managing director, Ajay Singh, in a conference in Dubai.

In January 2017, the airline placed a firm order for 100 737 MAX 8 aircraft, and revealed itself as the airline behind the 13 MAX 8 aircraft previously attributed to an unidentified customer, taking its total order to 155 MAX 8 aircraft with purchase rights for 50 additional MAX 8 and wide-body aircraft. The carrier planned to grow its operational fleet to 200 airplanes and expand regionally with the new 737 MAX family of airplanes. In June 2017, the airline signed a letter of intent with Bombardier to purchase up to 50 Q400 aircraft for catering to growth in passenger traffic arising from its participation in the Indian government's UDAN regional connectivity scheme.

In 2019, SpiceJet announced plans to induct 16 Boeing 737-800 NG to fulfil local and international demands due to the grounding of the Boeing 737 MAX fleet. In May 2020, when Jet Airways ceased operations, the airline placed orders for six additional Boeing 737-800 NG and five Bombardier Q400 to cover the shortage. In June 2023, SpiceJet announced plans to induct 10 Boeing 737 aircraft of which five would be 737 MAX aircraft to cater to the surge in passenger demand.

In 2019, SpiceJet had a fleet size of 74 aircraft and had progressively inducted more aircraft. In 2020, the airline had a fleet of 74 Boeing 737, 26 Bombardier Q-400s, 11 B737 MAX & Bombardier Q-400 freighters.

As of June 2024, of the 64 airlines of the fleet, 36 were grounded and of the 28 airworthy aircraft, fewer was being deployed for operations.

As of September 2024, due to financial constraints and legal reasons, the airline operates 20 aircraft while the others remain grounded. The airline revealed that it has around 30 aircraft grounded which is to return to the air soon and it also plans to have a 100-aircraft fleet by 2026. The airline revealed that it has enough slots, international traffic rights, pilots and crew, as well as the maintenance infrastructure for such an expansion. The airline could not receive new aircraft post-COVID like other Indian airlines. By March 2025, the airline will have a fleet of 40 and then add another 40 in the next year. It also plans for short term wet leases for extended operations during high-demand seasons. In fact, SpiceJet will induct 8 aircraft on lease in 2024-end.

As per reports on 8 October 2024, SpiceJet will induct seven aircraft on lease by 15 November. The deal for the lease has been signed while the first two aircraft have arrived in India and shall be inducted soon. The airline also said that three grounded aircraft will restart operations in November end and a total of seven will be ungrounded by year-end. The entire fleet is expected to be ungrounded within 18–24 months and ₹400 crore (equivalent to ₹426 crore or US$46 million in 2026) (from the qualified institutional placement (QIP) secured recently) is to be invested for spares, maintenance and engineering of the grounded fleet. The airline expects to have a 100-aircraft fleet by 2026.

As of 31 December 2024, the airline has 34 Boeing 737 jets (including 13 B737 MAX), 24 Q400 and 6 wet-leased aircraft of which 28 are operational. In 2025, the carrier plans to unground 30 aircraft and negotiate to restart deliveries of the 200 B737 MAX aircraft ordered in 2017. Spicejet also signed an agreement with US-based MRO company, StandardAero Inc. to support the ungrounding of the 737 MAX fleet, 3 of which are to be operationalised by April 2025.

As of 10 January 2025, the airline had a 62-aircraft fleet of which, 20 Boeing 737 (including leased aircraft), 2 Airbus A320 (on lease) and 6 DHC-8 Dash 8 were operational.

By April 2025, all ten of the aircraft planned for induction since October 2024 was completed and this included seven aircraft on lease. The carrier planned to double its fleet by the next year. In September 2025, the airline signed an agreement to lease eight additional aircraft besides the two earlier agreements to lease ten aircraft. The ten to-be-leased aircraft are expected to be inducted from October onwards. On 10 and 11 October, the airline inducted an Airbus A340 and two Boeing 737 aircraft of the total 20 aircraft that will be acquired on damp lease for until November. By mid-December, four additional grounded jets will also be revived.

For the winter schedule of 2026–27, SpiceJet had planned to damp and wet-lease 15 Boeing and 5 Airbus aircraft from three airlines between mid-October and mid-November. However, as of 20 November 2026, the airline has a fleet of only 10 operational aircraft, comprising of airline-owned and wet-leased planes.

=== Services ===
SpiceJet has moved away from the typical low-cost carrier service model of economy class-only seating. The airline offers premium services under the name SpiceMax, whereby passengers can obtain additional benefits including pre-assigned seats with extra legroom; meals on board; priority check-in and boarding; and priority baggage handling; at a higher fare. Otherwise SpiceJet does not provide complimentary meals in any of its flights. It does sell full in-flight meals on some flights. SpiceJet operates its frequent-flyer programme but does not provide any in-flight entertainment options. SpiceJet has partnered with Tripfactory and EaseMyTrip for selling holiday packages on its platform.

== Collaborations ==
- SpiceJet partnered with CleverTap to enhance customer experience by delivering personalized and contextual communication across its web and mobile channels, on 23 July 2023.
- Mankind Pharma partnered with SpiceJet to elevate brand awareness through plane displays, on 23 September 2023.
- Ajay Singh, the chairman and managing director of SpiceJet, in collaboration with Busy Bee Airways, placed a joint bid for the struggling airline Go First, on 24 February 2023.
