= Murasoli (India) =

Tamil language daily newspaper

- Type: Daily newspaper
- Format: Broadsheet E-paper
- Owner(s): M. Karunanidhi, and Murasoli trust
- Founder(s): M. Karunanidhi
- Publisher: Murasoli Maran
- Editor: Murasoli Selvam
- Founded: 10 August 1942; 83 years ago
- Political alignment: Dravida Munnetra Kazhagam
- Language: Tamil
- Headquarters: Kodambakkam Chennai, Tamil Nadu, India
- Country: India
- Circulation: 70,000 daily (as of January–June 2019)
- Website: m.murasoli.in/home epaper.murasoli.in

Murasoli (transl. Drumbeat) is an Indian Tamil language newspaper started by M. Karunanidhi, and is the mouthpiece of the political party DMK.

Murasoli was started in Tiruvarur on 10 August 1942, during the World War II, by 18-year old M. Karunanidhi. Its earliest editions were in form of handwritten notices authored by Karunanidhi under the pen name "Cheran". Until 1944, it was issued as a leaflet. Its publication had to be stopped in the mid-1940s due to lack of paper. It resumed as a weekly magazine on 14 January 1948. The newspaper headquarters were moved to Chennai in 1954.

M. Karunanidhi's blood relatives Murasoli Selvam and Murasoli Maran collaborated together and worked for Murasoli. Murasoli Selvam played a pivotal and instrumental role in uplifting the Dravida Munnetra Kazhagam's goodwill and public image by contributing to the party’s growth through his editorial work he displayed in Murasoli.

From 17 September 1960, it has been published as a daily. As of 2017, the newspaper has a circulation of 70,000 copies.
