= Sun NXT =

OTT platform by Sun TV Network

- Company type: Streaming
- Website type: OTT Platform
- Available in: Hindi English Tamil Telugu Malayalam Kannada Bengali Marathi
- Headquarters: Chennai, Tamil Nadu, India
- Area served: India; Bangladesh; United States; Canada; Europe; Singapore; Malaysia; Sri Lanka; South Africa; Australia; New Zealand; Middle East; Thailand
- Owner: Sun TV Network
- Industry: Entertainment, mass media
- Parent: Sun Group
- Website: www.sunnxt.com
- Commercial: Yes
- Registration: Required
- Users: 20 Million+
- Launched: June 2017; 9 years ago
- Current status: Active

Sun NXT is an Indian subscription video on demand over-the-top streaming service run by Sun TV Network. It was launched in June 2017 and has content in six languages - Hindi, English, Tamil, Telugu, Malayalam, Kannada, Bengali, and Marathi. The Sun NXT app is available for Android and iOS devices, Smart TVs and other devices.

== History ==
The service was launched in June 2017. Within four days of its launch, the app had obtained 1.1 million downloads. By November it was about seven million. By August 2019, Sun TV Network had planned to invest ₹150 crore in the platform over 18 months. By February 2020, the platform's subscriber base grew to about 15 million users and started making a profit. By the end of 2019, its subscriber base grew to 20 million.

== Content ==
At the time of launch the platform had over 4000 movies, allowed live streaming of over 40 television channels and catch-up TV in four languages. Content available apart from TV and movies are news, comedy clips, originals and music. As of February 2020, it had more than 410 shows and more than 4100 movies.

There are three subscription plans offered for its users on monthly, quarterly and annual basis.

== See also ==
- List of streaming media services
- Over-the-top media service in India
- Video on demand
- Disney+ Hotstar
- Netflix
- ZEE5
- ManoramaMAX
