= Sun TV Network =

Indian media company

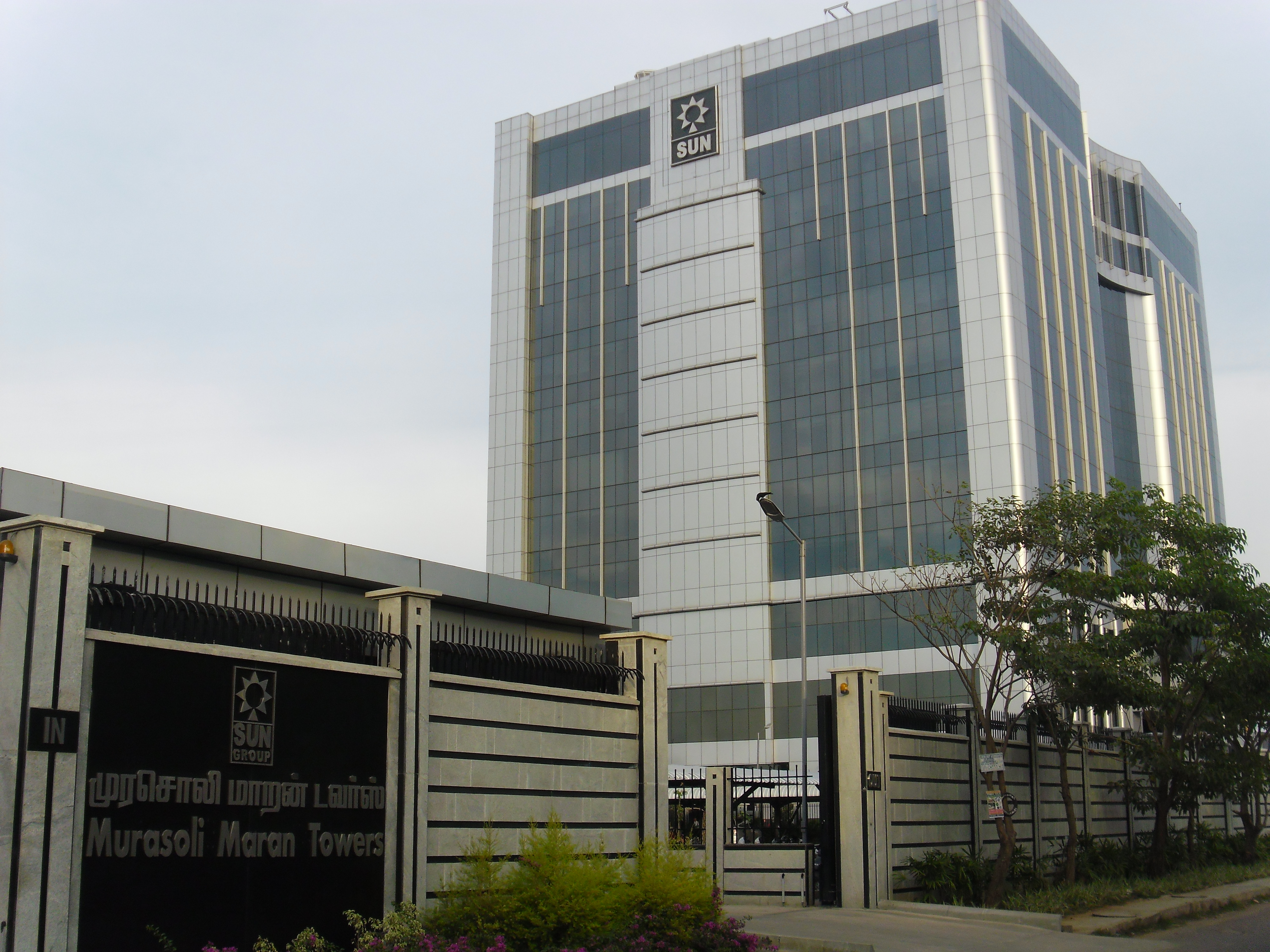
- Sun Network headquarters at Chennai
- Type: Public
- Traded as: BSE: 532733; NSE: SUNTV
- Industry: Media conglomerate
- Founded: 14 April 1993; 33 years ago
- Founder: Kalanithi Maran
- Headquarters: Chennai, Tamil Nadu, India
- Key people: Kalanithi Maran (Chairman)
- Products: Broadcasting; Over-the-top media service
- Revenue: ▲₹42.82 billion (US$460 million) (FY24)
- Operating income: ▲₹26.13 billion (US$280 million) (FY24)
- Net income: ▲₹19.26 billion (US$210 million) (FY24)
- Total assets: ▲₹114.21 billion (US$1.2 billion) (2024)
- Number of employees: 1,048 (2024)
- Parent: Sun Group
- Website: www.suntv.in www.sunnetwork.in

Sun TV Network Limited is an Indian media conglomerate headquartered in Chennai. It was established on 14 April 1993 by Kalanithi Maran and is a part of the Sun Group. It owns a number of television channels, and the OTT platform Sun NXT.

== Television channels ==
Sun TV Network owns and operates a number of TV channels across several Indian languages.

Channel	First aired	Language	Genre	SD/HD/4K
Sun TV	1993	Tamil	General Entertainment	SD+HD
KTV	2001	Tamil	Movies	SD+HD
Sun Music	2004	Tamil	Music	SD+HD
Sun News	2000	Tamil	News	SD+HD
Chutti TV	2007	Tamil	Kids	SD
Adithya TV	2009	Tamil	Comedy	SD
Sun Life	2012	Tamil	Classic	SD+HD
Sun Gemini	1995	Telugu	General Entertainment	SD+HD
Sun Gemini Movies	2000	Telugu	Movies	SD+HD
Sun Gemini Music	2005	Telugu	Music	SD+HD
Kushi TV	2009	Telugu	Kids	SD
Sun Gemini Comedy	2009	Telugu	Comedy	SD
Sun Gemini Life	2012	Telugu	Classic	SD
Sun Udaya	1994	Kannada	General Entertainment	SD+HD
Sun Udaya Movies	2000	Kannada	Movies	SD
Sun Udaya Music	2006	Kannada	Music	SD
Chintu TV	2009	Kannada	Kids	SD
Sun Udaya Comedy	2010	Kannada	Comedy	SD
Sun Surya	1998	Malayalam	General Entertainment	SD+HD
Sun Surya Movies	2005	Malayalam	Movies	SD
Kochu TV	2011	Malayalam	Kids	SD
Sun Surya Music	2013	Malayalam	Music	SD
Sun Surya Comedy	2017	Malayalam	Comedy	SD
Sun Bangla	2019	Bengali	General Entertainment	SD+HD
Sun Marathi	2021	Marathi	General Entertainment	SD+HD
Sun Neo	2024	Hindi	General Entertainment	SD+HD

=== Defunct channels ===
Channel	First aired	Ceased	Language	Genre	SD/HD/4K
Sun Action	2012	2017	Tamil	Movies	SD
Gemini Action	2012	2017	Telugu	Movies	SD
Gemini News	2004	2019	Telugu	News	SD
Suriyan TV	2012	2017	Kannada	Movies	SD
Udaya News	2004	2019	Kannada	News	SD
Kiran TV	2005	2017	Malayalam	Movies	SD
Surya Action	2012	2017	Malayalam	Movies	SD

== See also ==
- Sun Kudumbam Viruthugal
