= Sun Group =

Indian media conglomerate (1993)

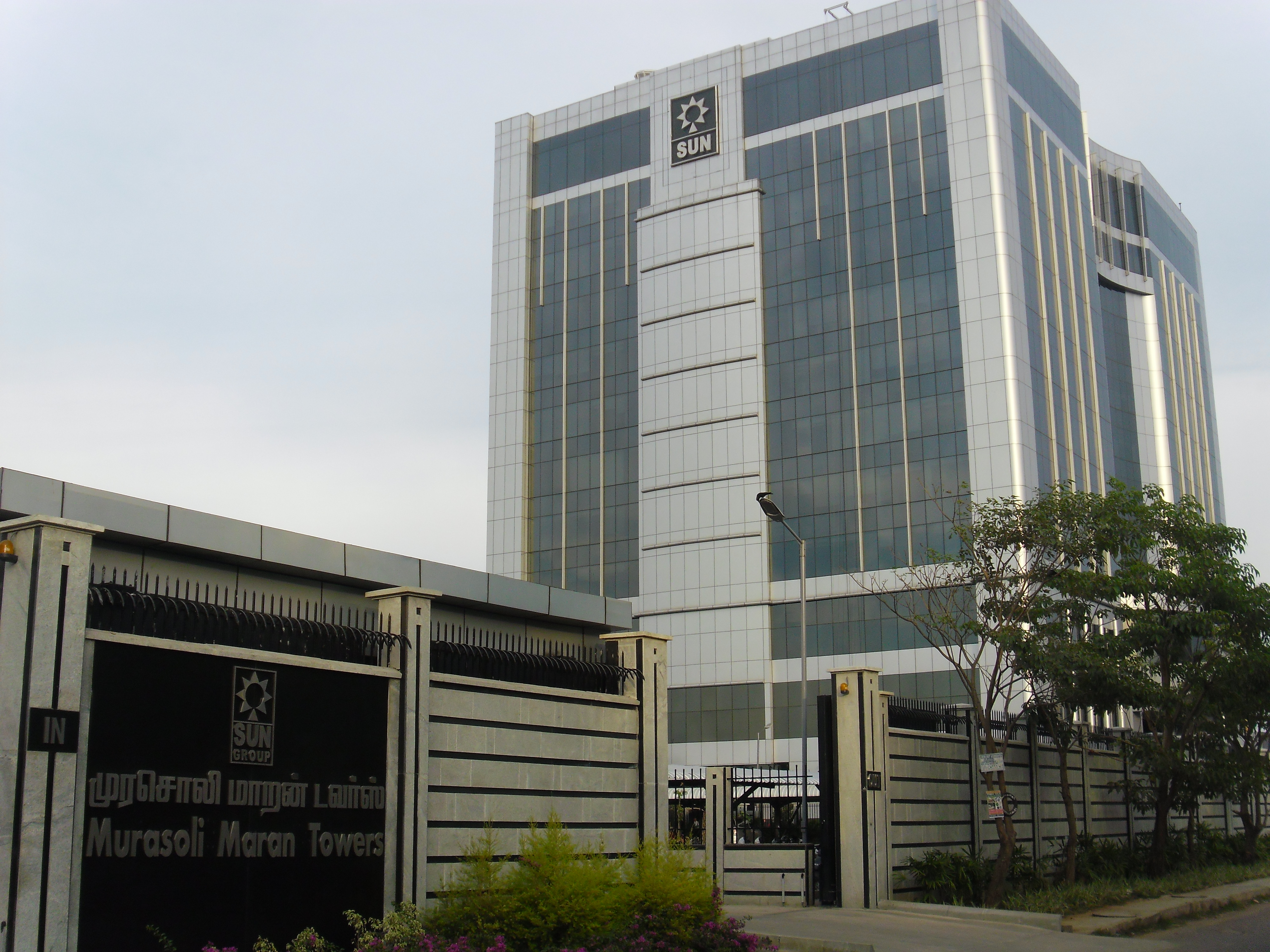
- Murasoli Maran Towers in Chennai
- Type: Corporate group
- Industry: Media conglomerate
- Founded: 14 April 1993; 33 years ago
- Headquarters: Murasoli Maran Towers, Chennai, Tamil Nadu, India
- Area served: Worldwide
- Key people: Kalanithi Maran (Chairman & founder); Kaviya Maran (Executive director)
- Services: Publishing; Broadcasting; Cable television; Professional sports league organization; Radio; Film
- Owner: Kalanithi Maran
- Subsidiaries: Sun TV Network; Sun Direct; Sun Pictures; Sun NXT; Red FM; Suryan FM; Sunrisers Hyderabad; Sunrisers Eastern Cape; Sunrisers Leeds; Dinakaran
- Website: www.sun.in

Sun Group is an Indian media conglomerate, based in Chennai. It was founded by Kalanithi Maran in 1993. The Sun Group, besides television media, operates 48 FM radio stations, two daily newspapers, five magazines, a DTH satellite service and T20 cricket franchises.

== Subsidiaries ==
=== Television ===
In 1990, Kalanithi Maran started a monthly video (VHS) news magazine in Tamil called Poomaalai. Sun TV is the first and flagship channel of the group started on 14 April 1993. Sun TV was listed on the Bombay Stock Exchange on 24 April 2006 upon raising $133 million. Sun Group owns Sun TV Network's 37 TV Channels across four South Indian languages Tamil, Telugu, Kannada, Malayalam, and the company's first step of TV Channel segment in North India is Bengali language and in the Marathi language the company launched TV Channel on 17 October 2021, the Group's second step of TV channel segment in North India. Sun TV Network launched its first Hindi Entertainment Channel language, on June 16, 2024, aiming to capture the Hindi-speaking market

=== DTH and Cable Provider ===
Sun Direct is a DTH service provider established in December 2007. Sun Direct is the fourth largest DTH service provider in India as of March 2015. From its launch Sun Direct DTH continue to be the Market Leader of South India.

=== Radio ===
The group owns 70 FM Radio stations across India broadcasting under the names Red FM, Suryan FM, Magic FM 106.4.

=== Newspapers and magazines ===
SUN Group owns two daily newspapers and five magazines in Tamil. Dinakaran was founded in 1977 by K. P. Kandasamy and was acquired from K. P. K. Kumaran by Sun Network in 2005. It is the second largest circulated Tamil daily in India after Dina Thanthi, back in 2010. Tamil Murasu is an evening newspaper. The group owns magazines Kungumam, Kumguma Chimizh, Kungumam Thozhi, Aanmigam, Mutharam and Vannathirai.

=== Film production ===
Sun Pictures is a film production and distribution company established in 2000. It produced the TV film Siragugal and Rajinikanth starrer Endhiran. It has distributed more than 20 Tamil films starting from Kadhalil Vizhunthen.

=== OTT Platform ===
Sun NXT is a global online audio/video streaming platform owned and operated by Sun Group's, Sun TV Network established in June 2017. It has more than 4000 movie titles including movies like Vijay's Sarkar Ajith Kumar's Mankatha, and Rajinikanth's Petta. Sun TV Network is planning to invest more in its OTT Platform, Sun NXT, by making original web series and original OTT movies from mid-2022.

=== Television Production Company ===
Sun Entertainment is Television production Company, which produces small budget movies for Sun TV Direct TV Premier, after movie released in TV it will be available only on Sun NXT OTT App, also co-producing all upcoming web series in Sun NXT OTT Platform which are coming soon in mid 2022 and also co-producing the serials which are showing in their TV Channels.

=== Sports ===
Sunrisers Hyderabad is a cricket franchise based in the city of Hyderabad that plays in the Indian Premier League (IPL). The team was bought by Kalanithi Maran in October 2012. Daniel Vettori is the head coach and Pat Cummins is the captain of the team. They also own the SA20 cricket franchise the Sunrisers Eastern Cape and The Hundred franchise Sunrisers Leeds.

=== Aviation ===
SUN Group acquired 37.7% stake in Indian low-cost carrier SpiceJet in June 2010. In 2012, Despite the losses, Kalanithi Maran increased his stake in Spicejet by investing ₹1 billion (US$10 million) in the airline. In January 2015, the Sun group sold its entire shareholding back to the airline's founder Ajay Singh and transferred control.

== Corporate social responsibility ==
In 2018, the Sun Group donated ₹2 crore to support the relief efforts in the cyclone-affected districts of Tamil Nadu.
