= Kalanithi Maran =

Indian media proprietor (born 1964)

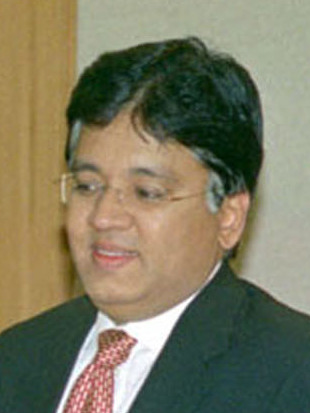
- Born: Kalanithi Murasoli Maran; 24 July 1964 (age 62); Chennai, Tamil Nadu, India
- Education: Loyola College, Chennai; University of Scranton
- Occupation: Media proprietor
- Known for: Founder & Chairman of the Sun Group
- Spouse: Kavery Maran
- Children: Kaviya Maran
- Parent(s): Murasoli Maran; Mallika Maran

Kalanithi Maran (born 24 July 1964) is an Indian billionaire media proprietor. He is the founder and chairman of Sun Group, one of India's largest media conglomerates. He owns multiple television channels, newspapers, weeklies, FM radio stations, DTH services, a movie production house (Sun Pictures), and three cricket team franchises: Sunrisers Hyderabad in the Indian Premier League, Sunrisers Eastern Cape in the SA20 League in South Africa and Sunrisers Leeds in The Hundred in England. He also held a major share in the Indian airline SpiceJet from 2010 to 2015.

Maran won Young Businessman awards from CNBC and Ernst & Young, and Forbes magazine named him the "Television king of southern India". As of November 2025, his net worth is US$2.57 billion.

== Early life ==
Maran was born to former Union Minister Murasoli Maran in Chennai on 24 July 1964. He is the grand-nephew of former Tamil Nadu chief minister M. Karunanidhi.

Maran attended the Don Bosco Matriculation Higher Secondary School and continued his education through Loyola College, Chennai. To finish his formal education, he traveled to the United States, earning his MBA from the University of Scranton. Maran was fascinated by the number of television channels available there, whereas India still had only one due to the Doordarshan monopoly.

== Career ==
Upon completing his MBA, he returned to India in 1987 to work for his family's small publishing company, which included a weekly women's magazine. In 1990, Maran started a monthly video magazine in Tamil called Poomaalai. For every copy given to a public library, about 200 pirated copies were produced. The primary market of Poomaalai was Sri Lankan Tamils who fled to Europe. On the 14th of April 1993, he founded Sun TV. Sun TV was listed on the Bombay Stock Exchange on the 24th of April 2006 upon raising $133 million for 10% of the share capital, making Maran a billionaire. He was a representative at a roundtable with the visiting then United States president Bill Clinton.

Under his leadership, channels owned by the Sun TV Network became some of the most viewed and commercially successful channels in South India. Sun TV was also the first channel in the country to establish its own earth station.

In June 2010, he acquired a 37% stake in SpiceJet from billionaire investor Wilbur Ross and promoter Bhupendra Kansagra, in his individual capacity and through his aviation company, KAL Airways. He also put up an open offer for 20%, which increased his stake to more than 50%.

Maran and his wife, Kavery, were ranked the highest paid business executives in the list of Indian executive pay charts with a package of ₹62 crore (US$6.4 million) each in 2014.

On 24 February 2015, he sold his stake in SpiceJet to Ajay Singh, the co-founder of the airline, as part of a reconstruction and revival scheme, since the airline was facing huge losses.

In 2023, he was the 77th-richest Indian, with a net worth of US$3 billion. The same year, his production house, Sun Pictures, produced Jailer, starring South-Indian actor Rajinikanth, which went on to become the highest performing film of 2023 and second-highest grossing Tamil film of all-time.

== Personal life ==
Maran married Kavery, a native of Kodagu. They have a daughter, Kaviya Maran, who is an executive director of Sun TV Network and heads the group's cricket franchises, including Sunrisers Hyderabad in the Indian Premier League, Sunrisers Eastern Cape in the SA20 in South Africa and Sunrisers Leeds in The Hundred in England.

In June 2025, Maran's younger brother, Dayanidhi Maran, issued a legal notice accusing him and others of corporate fraud and irregularities relating to the ownership and transfer of shares in Sun TV Network and associated companies. The notice alleged that Kalanithi had allotted 1.2 million shares to himself in 2003 for ₹1.2 crore without the necessary approvals, giving him a controlling stake, and alleged subsequent irregularities in the transfer of shares and company assets.

Sun TV Network described the dispute as a personal family matter. In August 2025, Sun TV announced that the legal notices had been unconditionally and irrevocably withdrawn and that the issues had been resolved; the terms of the settlement were not publicly disclosed.
