= Television in India =

The television industry in India is one of the largest broadcasting ecosystems in the world, producing thousands of programmes across numerous Indian languages. According to the 2020 TV Universe Estimates released by the BARC India, the country had approximately 210 million television households.

By 2025, the Government of India reported that India had 918 operational private satellite TV channels, serving a nationwide audience of more than 900 million viewers. Industry projections indicate continued growth, with television households expected to increase from 190 million in 2024 to 214 million by 2026.

The industry operates in dozens of languages, with national channels broadcasting in Hindi and English, alongside major regional networks in Tamil, Telugu, Kannada, Malayalam, Bengali, Marathi, Odia, Punjabi, Gujarati, Urdu, Assamese, Bhojpuri, Konkani and several others. Industry studies by KPMG and FICCI highlight the dominance of the Hindi, Tamil and Telugu television markets, which collectively command the largest share of viewership and revenues.

The national broadcaster is Doordarshan, owned by Prasar Bharati. There are several commercial television broadcasters such as Culver Max Entertainment (Sony), Disney Star, Viacom18 (owned by Reliance Industries through Network18 Group), Warner Bros. Discovery India and Zee Entertainment Enterprises at the national level, and Sun TV Network and ETV Network at the regional level.

Currently, the major Hindi general entertainment channels (GECs) dominating pay television include StarPlus, Sony SAB, Sony Entertainment Television, Zee TV and Colors TV. Since 2019, free-to-air Hindi channels such as Dangal and Goldmines have grown significantly in popularity due to their availability on DD Free Dish. Regional-language channels like Sun TV and Star Vijay (Tamil), Star Maa and Zee Telugu (Telugu), Asianet (Malayalam) and Star Pravah (Marathi) also continue to lead viewership rankings.

Unlike many other countries, major Indian entertainment channels generally do not air news, with some exceptions in South India such as Sun TV and ETV. This practice is partly attributed to Indian media regulations that restrict Foreign Direct Investment (FDI) in news broadcasting to 26%. Foreign-owned broadcasters such as Star have previously exited news broadcasting. Several media groups, including ABP Group, India Today Group, TV9 Network and ITV Network, operate exclusively news channels, while others such as NDTV and The Times Group operate both news and non-news channels. Meanwhile, Zee Media Corporation and Network18 Group function separately from the Zee and Viacom18 entertainment businesses, which have foreign shareholdings.

== History ==
In January 1950, The Indian Express reported that a television was put up for demonstration at an exhibition in the Teynampet locality of Chennai (formerly Madras) by B. Sivakumaran, a student of electrical engineering. A letter was scanned and its image was displayed on a cathode-ray tube screen. The report said that "It may be this is not the whole of television but it is certainly the most significant link in the system" and added that the demonstration of the sort could be the "first in India".

The first TV transmitter in India was installed in the Electronics and Telecommunications Engineering Department of the Jabalpur Engineering College on 24 October 1951.

In Srinagar, television was first used in the house of the Jan family, which was a huge milestone for industrialisation.

In 1952, the government's Scientific Advisory Committee for Broadcasting recommended the creation of a pilot station to showcase television's potential to viewers. A television demonstration was held in Bombay from 10 to 12 October 1954. In 1955, an officer of All India Radio went to the United States to study telecommunications. Television remains a widely consumed medium across India, with its reach spanning millions of viewers across urban and rural regions. An experiment was conducted at the American Pavilion of the 1955 Indian Industries Fair, which opened on 29 October 1955, with PM Nehru being the first face to appear on television in India. Existing radio networks were open to start a television network.

Terrestrial television in India officially started with the experimental telecast starting in Delhi on 15 September 1959 with a small transmitter and a makeshift studio. Daily transmission began in 1965 as a part of Akashvani (formerly All India Radio AIR). Television service was later extended to Mumbai (formerly Bombay) and Amritsar in 1972. Up until 1975, only seven Indian cities had television services. Satellite Instructional Television Experiment (SITE) was an important step taken by India to use television for development. The programmes were mainly produced by Doordarshan (DD) which was then a part of AIR. The telecast happened twice a day, in the mornings and evenings. Other than information related to agriculture, health and family planning were the other important topics dealt with in these programmes. Entertainment was also included in the form of dance, music, drama, folk and rural art forms. Television services were separated from radio in 1976. The national telecast was introduced in 1982. In the same year, colour television was introduced in the Indian market. The introduction of colour television was sluggish compared to other countries, taking into account rampant poverty, the cost of conversion and the late arrival of television to cities such as Bengaluru, whose television station switched on in November 1981. By contrast, both Pakistan and Bangladesh already had colour television. The return of Indira Gandhi to government also enabled the improvement of radio and television infrastructure. In 1983, Minister H.K.L. Bhagat suggested that the conversion to colour television would be complete by 1985, by then with a possible 17-hour daily schedule, as well as a project to launch 70 new low-powered transmitters to increase its reach to virtually every city and city cluster.

Indian small-screen programming began in the early 1980s. During this time, there was only one national channel, the government-owned Doordarshan. Mythological TV series Ramayan and Mahabharat, both based on the Indian epics of the same names, were the first major television series produced. They notched up a world record in viewership numbers. By the late 1980s, more people began to own television. Though there was a single channel, television programming had reached saturation. Hence, the government initiated another service, which had part national programming and part regional. The channel, known as DD Metro (formerly DD 2) was broadcast terrestrially along with DD National. In 1997, Prasar Bharati, a statutory autonomous body was established. Doordarshan along with AIR were converted into government corporations under Prasar Bharati. The Prasar Bharati Corporation was established to serve as the public service broadcaster of the country which would achieve its objectives through AIR and Doordashan. This was a step towards greater autonomy for Doordarshan and AIR. However, Prasar Bharati has not succeeded in shielding Doordarshan from government control.

The transponders of the American satellites PAS-1 and PAS-4 helped in the transmission and broadcast of Doordarshan's television services. An international channel called DD International was launched in 1995 and it broadcast programmes for 19 hours a day to foreign countries via PAS-4 to Europe, Asia and Africa and PAS-1 to North America.

The 1980s was the "Golden Era of Doordarshan" with various shows like Hum Log (1984–1985), Wagle Ki Duniya (1988), Buniyaad (1986–1987) and comedy shows like Yeh Jo Hai Zindagi (1984) glued millions to Doordarshan and later on Chandrakanta (1994–1996). Hindi film songs-based programmes like Chitrahaar, Rangoli, Superhit Muqabla and crime thrillers like Karamchand, Byomkesh Bakshi. Shows targeted at children included Divyanshu Ki Kahaniyan, Vikram Aur Betaal, Malgudi Days, and Tenali Rama. It is also noted that Bengali filmmaker Prabir Roy had the distinction of introducing colour television coverage in India in February–March 1982 during the Nehru Cup, a football tournament which was held at Eden Gardens, Kolkata, with five on-line camera operation, before Doordarshan started the same during the 1982 Asian Games in November that year.

The central government, under the leadership of the Congress, launched a series of economic and social reforms in 1991 under the then-Prime Minister P. V. Narasimha Rao. Under the new policies, the government allowed private and foreign broadcasters to engage in limited operations in India. This process has been pursued consistently by all subsequent federal administrations. Foreign broadcasters like CNN, the BBC and Disney Star and private domestic broadcasters such as ZEEL, ETV Network, Sun TV and Asianet started satellite broadcasts. Starting with 41 sets in 1962 and one channel, by 1995, television in India had covered more than 70 million homes giving a viewing population of more than 400 million individuals through more than 100 channels.

== Broadcast media ==
There are at least five basic types of television in India: broadcast or "over-the-air" television, unencrypted satellite or "free-to-air", Direct-to-Home (DTH), cable television, IPTV and OTT. Over-the-air terrestrial and free-to-air TV (such as DD Free Dish) is free with no monthly payments while cable, DTH, and IPTV require a subscription that varies depending on how many channels a subscriber chooses to pay for and how much the provider is charging for the packages. Channels are usually sold in groups or a la carte. All television service providers are required by law to provide the a la carte selection of channels. India is the second largest pay-TV market in the world in terms of subscribers after China and has more than doubled from 32% in 2001 to 66% in 2018.

=== Terrestrial television ===
In India, the broadcast of free-to-air television is governed through a state-owned Prasar Bharati corporation, with the Doordarshan group of channels being the only broadcaster. As such, cable television is the primary source of TV programming in India.

=== Broadcast cable and satellite television ===
As per the TAM Annual Universe Update – 2015, India had over 167 million households (out of 234 million) with televisions, of which over 161 million have access to cable or satellite television, including 84 million households which are DTH subscribers. Digital TV households have grown by 32% since 2013 due to migration from terrestrial and analogue broadcasts. TV-owning households have been growing at between 8–10%. Digital TV penetration is at 64% as of September 2014. India now has over 850 TV channels (2018) covering all the main languages spoken in the nation and whereby 197 million households own televisions.

The growth in digital broadcast has been due to the introduction of a multi-phase digitization policy by the Government of India. An ordinance was introduced by the government regarding the mandatory digitisation of cable services. According to this amendment made in Section 9 of the Cable Television Networks (Regulation) Amendment Ordinance, 1995, the Ministry of Information and Broadcasting is in the process of making the Digital Addressable System mandatory. As per the policy, viewers would be able to access digital services only through a set-top box.

Starting in December 1991, Star TV introduced four major television channels into the Indian broadcasting space that had so far been monopolised by the Indian government-owned Doordarshan: MTV, STAR Plus, Star Movies, BBC World Service Television and Prime Sports. In October 1992, India saw the launch of Zee TV, the first privately owned Indian channel to broadcast over cable followed by the Asia Television Network (ATN). A few years later CNN, Discovery Channel and National Geographic made their foray into India. Later, Star TV Network expanded its bouquet with the introduction of STAR World, STAR Sports, ESPN, Channel V and STAR Gold.

With the launch of the Tamil Sun TV in 1993, South India saw the birth of its first private television channel. With a network comprising more than 20 channels in various South India languages, Sun TV network recently launched a DTH service and its channels are now available in several countries outside India. Following Sun TV, several television channels sprung up in the south. Among these are the Tamil channel Raj TV (1993) and the Malayalam channel Asianet launched in 1993 from Asianet Communications, which was later acquired by Disney Star. Asianet Cable Network and Asianet Broadband were from Asianet Communication Ltd. These three networks and their channels today take up most of the broadcasting space in South India. In 1994, industrialist N. P. V. Ramasamy Udayar launched a Tamil channel called GEC (Golden Eagle Communication), which was later acquired by Vijay Mallya and renamed as Vijay TV. In Telugu, Telugu daily newspaper Eenadu started its television division called ETV Network in 1995 and later diversified into other Indian languages. The same year, another Telugu channel called Gemini TV was launched which was later acquired by the Sun TV Network in 1998.

Throughout the 1990s, along with a multitude of Hindi-language channels, several regional and English-language channels flourished all over India. By 2001, international channels HBO and The History Channel started providing service. In 1995–2003, other international channels such as Cartoon Network, Nickelodeon, VH1 and Toon Disney entered the market. Starting in 2003, there has been an explosion of news channels in various languages; the most notable among them are NDTV 24x7, NDTV India, CNN-News18, Times Now and Aaj Tak.

==== Conditional Access System ====
CAS, or conditional access system, is a digital mode of transmitting TV channels through a set-top box (STB). The transmission signals are encrypted and viewers need to buy a set-top box to receive and decrypt the signal. The STB is required to watch only pay channels.

The idea of CAS was mooted in 2001, due to a furore over charge hikes by channels and subsequently by cable operators. Poor reception of certain channels; arbitrary pricing and increase in prices; bundling of channels; poor service delivery by Cable Television Operators (CTOs); monopolies in each area; lack of regulatory framework and redress avenues were some of the issues that were to be addressed by implementation of CAS

It was decided by the government that CAS would be first introduced in the four metros. It has been in place in Chennai since September 2003, where, until very recently, it had managed to attract very few subscribers. It has been rolled out recently in the other three metros of Delhi, Mumbai and Kolkata.

As of April 2008 Only 25 per cent of the people have subscribed to the new technology. The rest watch only free-to-air channels. As mentioned above, the inhibiting factor from the viewer's perspective is the cost of the STB.

=== Analogue switchover ===
The Ministry of Information and Broadcasting issued a notification on 11 November 2011, setting 31 March 2015 as the deadline for complete shift from analogue to digital systems. In December 2011, Parliament passed the Cable Television Networks (Regulation) Amendment Act to digitise the cable television sector by 2014. Chennai, Delhi, Kolkata, and Mumbai had to switch by 31 October 2012. The second phase of 38 cities, including Bangalore, Chandigarh, Nagpur, Patna, and Pune, was to switch by 31 March 2013. The remaining urban areas were to be digitised by 30 November 2014 and the rest of the country by 31 March 2015.

Phase (planned date)	City/Region	Date of switchover^{†}
Phase I (31 October 2012)	Delhi	31 October 2012
Phase I (31 October 2012)	Mumbai	31 October 2012
Phase I (31 October 2012)	Kolkata	15 January 2013
Phase I (31 October 2012)	Chennai	Not completed
Phase II (31 March 2013)	38 cities in 15 states	31 March 2013
Phase III (30 September 2014)	All remaining urban areas	31 March 2017
Phase IV (31 December 2014)	Rest of India	31 December 2022

†Indicates the date when analogue signals were switched off and not necessarily the date when 100% digitisation was achieved.

==== Phase I ====
Phase (planned date)	City/Region	Date of switchover^{†}
Phase I (31 October 2012)	Delhi	31 October 2012
Phase I (31 October 2012)	Mumbai	31 October 2012
Phase I (31 October 2012)	Kolkata	15 January 2013
Phase I (31 October 2012)	Chennai	Not completed
Phase II (31 March 2013)	38 cities in 15 states	31 March 2013
Phase III (30 September 2014)	All remaining urban areas	31 March 2017
Phase IV (31 December 2014)	Rest of India	31 December 2022

From midnight on 31 October 2012, analogue signals were switched off in Delhi and Mumbai. Pirated signals were available in parts of Delhi even after the date. In Kolkata, on 30 October 2012, the state government refused to switch off analogue signals citing low penetration of set-top boxes (STBs) required for receiving digital signals. The Ministry did not push for switching off of analogue signals in Kolkata. After approximately the Centre estimated that 75% of Kolkata households had installed STBs, the ministry issued a directive to stop airing analogue channels in some parts of the city beginning 16 December and completely switch off analogue signals after 27 December. On 17 December 2012, the West Bengal government openly defied the directive and stated that it would not implement it. The state government then announced that it would extend the deadline to 15 January 2013. The Ministry had initially threatened to cancel the licence of multi system operators (MSOs) in Kolkata if they did not switch off all analogue channels. However, the ministries softened their stand following a letter from MSOs, explaining how they were sandwiched between divergent orders from the Central and State Governments.

In Chennai, the deadline was extended twice to 5 November by the Madras High Court. The extension was in response to a petition filed by the Chennai Metro Cable TV Operators Association (CMCOA), who argued at the beginning of November that only 1,64,000 homes in Chennai had the proper equipment, and three million households would be left without service. When a week later only a quarter of households had their set-top boxes, the Madras High Court further extended the deadline to 9 November. The Ministry of Information and Broadcasting stated that it would allow an additional extension to 31 December. As of March 2013, out of 3 million subscribers, 2.4 million continued to be without set-top boxes.

A similar petition, filed by a local cable operator (LCO), to extend the deadline in Mumbai was rejected by the Bombay High Court on 31 October 2012.

==== Phase II ====
In the second phase, 38 cities in 15 states had to digitise by 31 March 2013. Of the 38, Maharashtra has 9 cities, Uttar Pradesh has 7 and Gujarat has 5.

About 25% of the 16 million households covered did not have their equipment installed before the deadline. Secretary Uday Kumar Varma extended a 15-day grace period. The Ministry estimated that as of 3 April 2013, 25% of households did not have set-top boxes. Enforcement of the switchover varied from city to city. Vishakhapatnam had the lowest rate of conversion to the new system at 12.18 per cent. Other cities that had low figures included Srinagar (20 per cent), Coimbatore (28.89 per cent), Jabalpur (34.87 per cent) and Kalyan Dombivli (38.59 per cent).

=== Satellite television ===
As of 2016, over 1600 TV satellite television channels are broadcast in India. This includes channels from the state-owned Doordarshan, Disney India owned Star, Sony owned Sony Entertainment Television, Zee TV, Sun TV Network and Asianet. Direct To Home service is provided by Airtel Digital TV, DD Free Dish, DishTV, Sun Direct, Tata Play and Videocon D2H. Dish TV was the first one to come up in Indian Market, others came only years later.

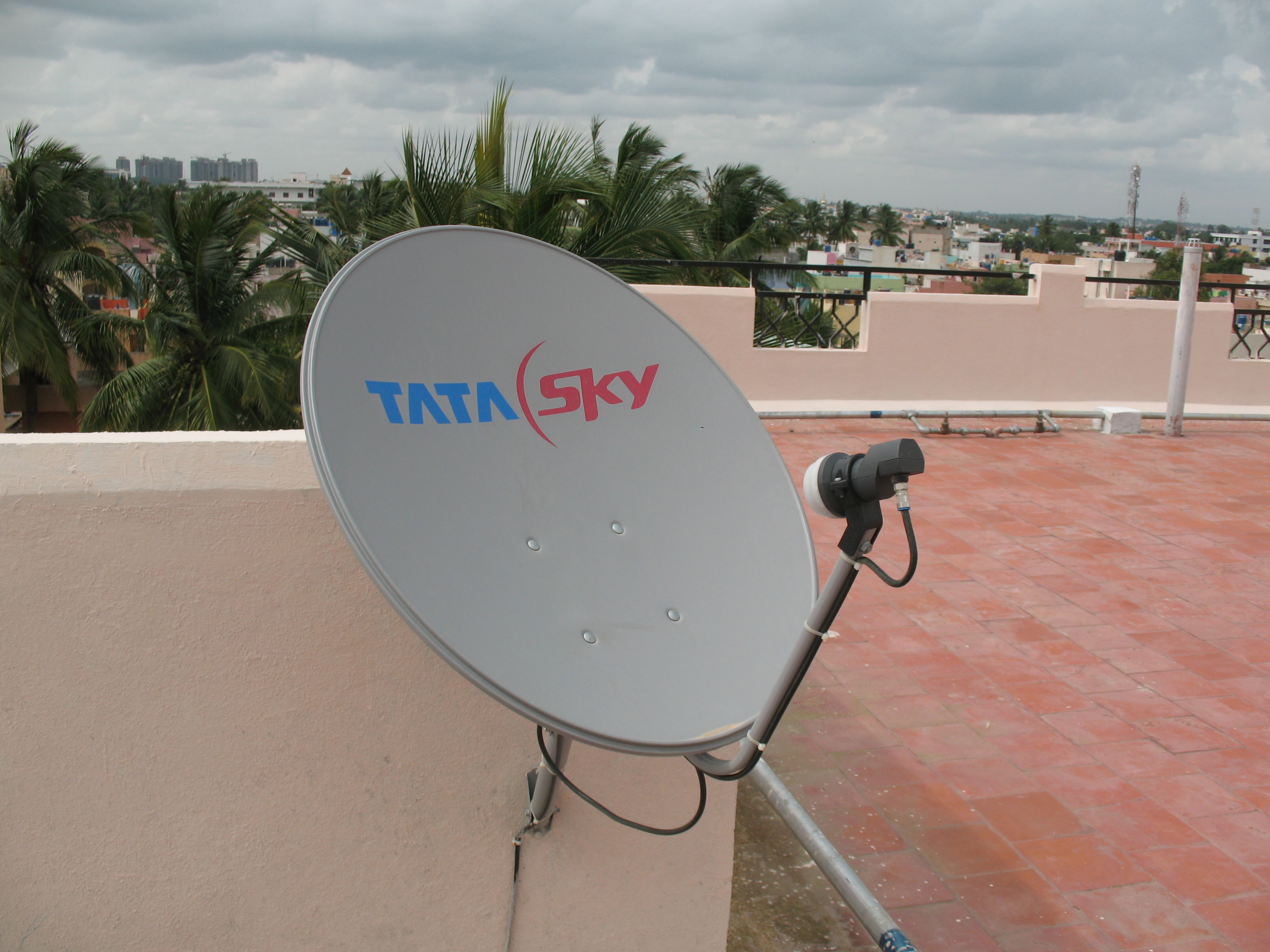
Tata Sky Dish India

These services are provided by locally built satellites from ISRO such as INSAT 4CR, INSAT 4A, INSAT-2E, INSAT-3C and INSAT-3E as well as private satellites such as the Dutch-based SES, Global-owned NSS-6, Thaicom-2 and Telstar 10.

DTH is defined as the reception of satellite programmes with a personal dish in an individual home. As of December 2012, India had roughly 54 million DTH subscribers.

Cable TV is through cable networks and DTH is wireless, reaching direct to the consumer through a small dish and a set-top box. Although the government has ensured that free-to-air channels on cable are delivered to the consumer without a set-top box, DTH signals cannot be received without the set-top box.

India currently has 5 major DTH service providers (including Free-to-Air provided DD Free Dish) and a total of over 54 million subscriber households as of December 2012. DishTV (a ZEE TV subsidiary), Tata Play, Sun Network owned ' Sun Direct DTH', Bharti Airtel's DTH Service 'Airtel Digital TV' and the public sector DD Free Dish. As of 2012, India has the most competitive Direct-broadcast satellite market, with 7 operators vying for more than 135 million TV homes. India overtook the US as the world's largest Direct-broadcast satellite market in 2012.

The rapid growth of DTH in India has propelled an exodus from cabled homes, and the need to measure viewership in this space is more than ever; aMap, the overnight ratings agency, has mounted a people meter panel to measure viewership and interactive engagement in DTH homes in India.

=== Internet Protocol Television (IPTV) ===
There are IPTV Platforms available for subscription in India in the main cities as broadband in many parts of the country, they are

- iControl IPTV A joint venture between MTNL and BSNL also in association with Aksh Optifiber a company that also provides FTTH and VoIP services available in some of the main cities in India such as Mumbai which has about 200 television channels on offer with time shifting in several basic and premium Packages including Movies on Demand offered at various basic, premium and pay-per-view rates and other services such as an interactive karaoke channel, The IPTV operator uses the UTStarcom Rolling Stream IPTV Solution as its end-to-end Delivery Platform.
- Airtel IPTV is available in some of the main cities in India such as New Delhi and Bangalore which have about 175 television channels on offer with time shifting in several TV packages and a small number of television channels offered on premium subscription rates including Movies on Demand offered at premium and pay-per-view rates SVOD and other services such as Digital Radio and Games, The IPTV Operator uses the UTStarcom RollingStream IPTV Solution as its end-to-end delivery platform.
- Smart TV group also operates an IPTV platform based on the Sea-Change International IPTV and Cisco IPTV standards in many parts of India with the following services:

- 185 TV channels on various basic and premium packages
- 40 TV channels Video on demand (VOD) service
- 250 hours Digital video recorder (DVR)
- A 5000+ hour movie library
- Digital Radio and Karaoke Service

The service is available to MTNL and BSNL broadband Internet customers.

- APSFL is an IPTV service provider. It was launched in 2016 and offers over 250 channels, out of which 49 are in HD. It is currently only available in Andhra Pradesh.

== Programming ==
Indian television drama is by far the most common genre on Indian television. Fiction shows (including thriller dramas and sitcoms) are extremely popular among Indian audiences. There are thousands of television programmes in India, all ranging in length, air time, genre and language.

Major sports networks include Star Sports, Sony Sports Network, Eurosport and DD Sports.

== Advertising ==
India has a huge advertising industry. In 2021, India's advertising sector generated revenue worth ₹74,600 crore, which included type types advertising. Traditionally organisations and manufacturing industries used to advertise through Television due to its vast reach. Indian TV and print media frequently run advertisements are often types of Surrogate advertisings, False advertisings etc. Alcohol advertising is illegal in India but brands frequently run surrogate advertising campaigns. The Central Consumer Protection Authority (CCPA), the consumer rights protection body of the Consumer Affairs Ministry issued guidelines against surrogate advertising.

== Audience metrics ==
Television metrics in India have gone through several phases in which it fragmented, consolidated and then fragmented again. One key difference in Indian culture is that families traditionally limit themselves to owning only one screen.

=== DART ===
During the days of the single-channel Doordarshan monopoly, DART (Doordarshan Audience Research Team) was the only metric available. This used the notebook method of recordkeeping across 33 cities across India. DART continues to provide this information independent of the Private agencies. DART is one of the rating systems that measure audience metrics in Rural India.

=== TAM and INTAM ===
In 1994, claiming a heterogeneous and fragmenting television market ORG-MARG (Operations Research Group - Multiple Action Research Group) introduced INTAM (Indian National Television Audience Measurement). Ex-Doordarshan officials claimed that INTAM was introduced by vested commercial interests who only sought to break the monopoly of DD and that INTAM was significantly weaker in both sample size, rigour and the range of cities and regions covered.

In 1997, a joint industry body appointed TAM (backed by Nielsen Corporation) as the official recordkeeper of audience metrics. Due to the differences in methodology and samples of TAM and INTAM, both provided differing results for the same programmes.

In 2001, a confidential list of households in Mumbai that were participating in the monitoring survey was released, calling into question the reliability of the data. This subsequently led to the merger of the two measurement systems into TAM. For several years after this, despite misgivings about the process, sample and other parameters, TAM was the de facto standard and monopoly in the audience metrics game.

=== AMAP ===
In 2004, a rival ratings service funded by American NRI investors, called Audience Measurement Analytics Limited (AMAP) was launched. Although initially, it faced a cautious uptake from clients, the TAM monopoly was broken.

What differentiates aMap is that its ratings are available within one day as compared to TAM's timeline of one week.

=== BARC India ===
Broadcast Audience Research Council (BARC) India is an industry body set up to design, commission, supervise and own an accurate, reliable and timely television audience measurement system for India. It currently measures the TV Viewing habits of 183 million TV households in the country, using 30,000 sample panel homes. This will go up to 50,000 in the next couple of years, as mandated by the Ministry of Information and Broadcasting (MIB).

As per the Broadcast Audience Research Council's Broadcast India (BI) 2018 Survey released in July 2018, based on a sample of 3 lakh homes in the country, TV homes in the country have seen a 7.5% jump, outpacing the growth of homes in India which grew at 4.5%. India currently boasts 298 million homes, of which 197 million have a TV set, having an opportunity to almost 100 more TV homes in the country.

Guided by the recommendations of the Telecom Regulatory Authority of India (TRAI) and Ministry of Information and Broadcasting (MIB) notifications of January 2014, BARC India brings together the three key stakeholders in television audience measurement – broadcasters, advertisers, and advertising and media agencies, via their apex bodies.

BARC India is committed to establishing a transparent governance framework for providing data points that are required to plan media spending more effectively.

The role of television media was especially crucial in 2020 as citizens were asked to stay home to fight the pandemic in India. Talking about how media was used as a tool to instil fear and discipline among the public in India during the lockdown, an article in the Doing Sociology blog discusses how television has so become part and parcel of life, the audio-visual platform was used for image-building and influence by the ruling dispensation on one hand, and utilized by popular brands for keeping the consumer culture up on the other.

== Awards ==
=== Hindi-language ===
- Indian Television Academy Awards
- Indian Telly Awards
- Gold Awards

== Effect of OTT on the Indian television industry ==
Online video streaming, also known as Over-the-top (OTT) services gained popularity in India after 2015. It created a threat to the Indian television industry. TV viewers have to follow the schedule of TV channels to watch their favourite programmes. On the other hand, OTT service providers allow their users to watch their favourite content whenever they want. Moreover, penetration of Internet access in India helps OTT users to access content from anywhere. This convenience of OTT has helped it to gain popularity among young internet users in India. The usage of OTT significantly increased during the national lockdown period (From March 2020 onwards) after the COVID-19 pandemic in India. More people began to watch OTT platforms for foreign content and their spending on TV was significantly reduced.

== See also ==
- Surrogate advertising - Deceptive advertising tactic by ill-legal Gambling companies, mobile apps in India
- List of television stations in India
- List of HD channels in India (HD Feed)
- Entertainment industry in India
- Digital television transition in India
