= Direct-to-home television in India =

Direct-to-Home (DTH) television is a method of receiving satellite television by means of signals transmitted from direct-broadcast satellites. The Government of India (GoI) permitted the reception and distribution of satellite television signals in November 2000. The first DTH service in the country was launched by Dish TV on 2 October 2003. DD Free Dish, the first free DTH service in India, was launched by public broadcaster Prasar Bharati in December 2004.

India is the largest DTH market in the world by number of subscribers. As per an industry estimate reported in 2022, pay DTH and cable sector together has a subscriber base of 122 million as in March 2021. Out of the total 125 million paid subscribers of the TV industry, 67 million are cable, 55 million are pay DTH subscribers and 3 million are HITS. Besides, there are 43 million viewers of free TV platform (DD Free Dish). The DTH and the cable sector presently cover more than 95% of the total pay TV viewing universe. Pay DTH sector has attained a total active subscriber base of around 65.58 million in the quarter ending 30 September 2022.

== History ==
=== Background ===
DTH services were first proposed in India in 1996. The proposal was not approved due to concerns over national security and negative cultural influence. In 1997, the Government of India banned DTH services when Rupert Murdoch-owned Indian Sky Broadcasting (ISkyB) was about to launch its DTH services in the country. After deliberations among groups of ministers, DTH services were permitted by the NDA government in November 2000. The ministers made four key recommendations to governing DTH services: no single entity, either private or state-owned, should be permitted a monopoly in DTH services; the vertical integration of DTH and cable television services should be monitored in order to prevent the formation of a monopoly in television distribution; the vertical integration of DTH operators and television channels should be avoided in order to ensure fair competition among TV channels.

The new policy announced in November 2000 required all DTH operators to set up earth stations in India within 12 months of receiving a license. DTH licenses were priced at $2.14 million with a validity of 10 years. The limit for foreign direct investment in the DTH sector was capped at 49%, and a company operating the services was required to be headed by an Indian citizen.

=== Early years ===
The first DTH service was launched in India on 2 October 2003 by Dish TV owned by Zee. The company decided not to compete against entrenched cable operators in metros and urban areas, and instead focused on providing services to rural areas and regions not serviced by cable television. Dish TV acquired 350,000 subscribers within 2 years of the launch. Public broadcaster Prasar Bharati launched DD Free Dish (formerly DD Direct Plus) in December 2004. The service is free and offers only free-to-air channels. Tata Play (formerly Tata Sky) was incorporated in 2004 as a joint venture between the Tata Group and Star India's parent company. Tata Play (formerly Tata Sky) launched DTH services in April 2007.

Unlike Dish TV, Tata Play (formerly Tata Sky) focused on metros and large cities aiming to attract customers away from cable by offering better picture and audio quality and wider selection of channels. Following legal proceedings between Star and Zee, in 2007, the two companies called a truce and began offering their channels on each other's services. This decision and Dish TV's acquisition of more transponders enabled them to offer 150 channels on their service, more than any other DTH service in India at the time.

Sun Direct and Airtel digital TV launched services in 2007 and 2008, respectively. Independent TV (formerly Reliance Big TV) was launched in August 2008. The service acquired 1 million subscribers within 90 days of launch, the fastest ramp-up ever achieved by any DTH operator in the world. d2h (formerly Videocon d2h) launched its services in June 2009.

The total number of DTH subscribers in India rose from 1.5 million in 2005 to 23 million in 2010. Sun Direct became the first DTH provider to offer high-definition (HD) channels in early 2010. Tata Play (formerly Tata Sky) began offering HD channels later that year. Other DTH providers subsequently began carrying HD channels.

==== À la carte ====
On 3 September 2007, the Telecom Regulatory Authority of India (TRAI) issued the Telecommunication (Broadcasting and Cable Services) Interconnection (Fourth Amendment) Regulation 2007, which went into law on December 1; the rules require all broadcasters to offer channels on an à la carte basis. The regulation states, "All broadcasters will compulsorily offer all their channels on à la carte basis to DTH operators. Additionally, they may also offer bouquets, but they will not compel any DTH operator to include the entire bouquet in any package being offered by DTH operators to their subscribers". Prior to the regulation, only customers in areas covered by the conditional access system (CAS), and cable systems providing the services, had the option of choosing to buy only the channels they were interested in. TRAI intervened after DTH operators complained that broadcasters were forcing them to carry channels that they did not want.

Several broadcasters, such as Star, Zee Turner Limited, Set Discovery and Sun TV, challenged TRAI's order in the Telecom Disputes Settlement and Appellate Tribunal (TDSAT). On 15 January 2008, TDSAT refused to grant a stay on the appeal challenging TRAI's directive; TDSAT overruled the broadcasters' objections. The agency later set aside TRAI's December 2007 tariff regime. TRAI challenged TDSAT's order in the Supreme Court, and stated in proceedings on 22 July 2010 that "in the analog, non-addressable environment, the authority is of the view that à la carte should not be made mandatory at the wholesale level as technological constraints in any case make it impossible for the benefits of à la carte provisioning to be passed on to subscribers".

TRAI ordered that pay television customers in India must be given a free choice of channels rather than be forced to choose package deals, enforcing a January 2011 deadline to implement the changes. The order stated, "Every service provider providing broadcasting services or cable services to its subscribers using an addressable system shall offer all pay channels to its subscribers on à la carte basis and shall specify the maximum retail price for each pay channel". Tata Play (formerly Tata Sky), Airtel digital TV, d2h (formerly Videocon d2h), and Independent TV (formerly Reliance Big TV) launched à la carte options in January 2011.

=== 2010s ===
The price of set top boxes (STB) in India plummeted in the decade since DTH services were launched. A standard STB was priced at ₹3999 in 2003, but dropped to ₹500 by 2014. In the same year, a DVR box capable of recording television programmes was priced at ₹2500.

In September 2012, the Union Government raised the cap for foreign direct investment in the DTH sector from 49% to 74%. The government permitted 100% foreign direct investment in the DTH industry in November 2015, with 49% through the automatic route and higher investments subject to government approval.

Videocon d2h began offering a preview of 4K Ultra HD content on its DTH service in July 2014, and launched India's first 4K Ultra HD channel on 26 January 2015. The channel is not dedicated to single genre and instead broadcasts video on demand (VOD), lifestyle and travel content, sports, infotainment, concerts and Hollywood films. The channel also telecasts 4K content created by international broadcasters. The first programs telecast on the channel were live broadcasts of select matches from the 2015 ICC Cricket World Cup. Tata Sky also offered live broadcasts of select matches in 4K.

Reliance Big TV was sold to Pantel Technologies and Veecon Media and Television in 2018. It was rebranded and relaunched as Independent TV. On 22 March 2018, Dish TV merged with Videocon d2h, creating the largest DTH provider in India. As of Sept 2019, Independent TV has ceased to exist.

== List of DTH providers ==
S. No.	Service Provider	Launch date	Subscribers	Ownership
1	DD Free Dish	16 December 2004	43.0 million	Prasar Bharati
2	Tata Play	8 August 2006	21.33 million	Tata Sons (70%) The Walt Disney Company India (30%)
3	Airtel digital TV	9 October 2008	17.19 million	Bharti Airtel
4	Sun Direct	December 2007	10.99 million	Sun Group (80%) Astro Group (20%)
5	Dish TV d2h Zing Digital	2 October 2003 20 June 2009 21 January 2015	10.84 million	Yes Bank (25.63%) Deutsche Bank (6.2%) Jawahar Goel (Promoter & Managing Director) family (5.93%) Housing Development Finance Corporation (4.7%) IndusInd Bank Ltd. (3.8%)

Market share of pay DTH operators in India as of 31 March 2025 according to the Telecom Regulatory Authority of India (TRAI)
1. Tata Play (31.4%)
2. Airtel digital TV (30.2%)
3. Sun Direct (19.3%)
4. Dish TV (19.1%)

Market share
Operators	Share
Cable	39.9%
DTH	32.7%
Free Dish	25.6%
HITS	1.8%
Television subscriptions split (as of March 2022).

== Satellites ==
The Department of Space (DoS) requires all DTH operators in India to only use satellites commissioned by the Indian Space Research Organisation (ISRO). DTH operators may use capacity leased by ISRO from foreign satellites only if sufficient capacity is not available on ISRO satellites. The following 8 satellites are currently in use by Indian DTH service providers:

No.	Satellite	Owner	Launch date	Mission life	Geostationary position	Operators
1	NSS-6	SES S.A.	17 December 2002	15 years	95° East	Dish TV
2	MEASAT-3	MEASAT Satellite Systems	11 December 2006	15 years	91.5° East	Sun Direct
3	SES-7	SES S.A.	16 May 2009	15 years	108.2° East	Airtel Digital TV
4	AsiaSat 5	AsiaSat	11 August 2009	15 years	100.5° East	Dish TV
5	ST-2	Singtel	20 May 2011	15 years	88° East	d2h, Zing Digital wholly owned by Dish TV
6	GSAT-10	ISRO	29 September 2012	15 years	83° East	Tata Play
7	GSAT-15	ISRO	10 November 2015	12 years	93.5° East	DD Free Dish and Sun Direct
8	GSAT-17	ISRO	28 June 2017	15 years		
9	GSAT-30	ISRO	16 January 2020	15 years	83° East	Tata Play
10	CMS-02	ISRO	22 June 2022	15 years	83° East	Tata Play
11	GSAT-20	ISRO	18 November 2024	15 years	68° East	Dish TV

== Compression standards ==
All DTH services in India currently use the MPEG-4 standard of signal compression. MPEG-2 permitted each transponder to carry approximately 20 SD channels (fewer, in case of HD channels), while MPEG-4 enables each transponder to carry approximately 50 SD channels (again, fewer in case of HD channels). The bandwidth required to carry a single HD channel is approximately equivalent to the bandwidth required to carry 4 SD channels.

== See also ==
- Digital television transition in India
