= List of video services using H.264/MPEG-4 AVC =

This page provides a list of specific service providers who are, or soon will be, providing video in the H.264/MPEG-4 AVC format. In some cases the list may include announced plans for services that have not yet actually been deployed.

== Terrestrial broadcast adoption ==
- Botswana's TV and mobile- segment terrestrial broadcast services of ISDB-T (1seg) uses the H.264/AVC codec, including major broadcaster such as Botswana Television.
- Brazil's terrestrial broadcast service uses H.264/AVC in ISDB-T.
- Colombia announced in August 2008 the adoption of the DVB-T broadcasting standard.
- Czech Republic, O2, one of DVB-T providers is broadcasting HD versions of TV channels CT1 and Nova experimentally in H.264/AVC.
- France's prime minister announced the selection of H.264/AVC as a requirement for receivers of HDTV and Pay TV channels for digital terrestrial broadcast television services (referred to as "TNT") in France in late 2004.
- Lithuania, Estonia, Latvia and Slovenia are expected to use H.264/AVC for all terrestrial digital television services.
- Hong Kong leading broadcaster, TVB, selected H.264 in for new digital services there, including HDTV service, in the China DMB-T/H system environment, starting from the end of 2007. Asia Television has joined this decision and uses H.264 for its new digital services too (both broadcasters use MPEG-2 to encode the digital simulcast of the existing analogue channels.)
- Hungary's DVB-T service, MinDigTV, uses H.264 for encoding both SD and HD transmissions, including simulcasts of analogue channels.
- Japan's Mobile-segment terrestrial broadcast services of ISDB-T (1seg) uses the H.264/AVC codec, including major broadcasters such as NHK and Fuji Television.
- Korea's Digital Multimedia Broadcast (DMB) service will use H.264/AVC.
- Poland will test DVB-T transmissions (as of 2007 working reliably for several years) use MPEG-2, but commercial run scheduled after 2010 will be MPEG-4 only.
- United Kingdom started high definition DTT broadcasts using H.264 for its DVB-T2 FTA service Freeview HD service from 2 sites on 2 December 2009 although no DVB-T2 receivers were sold to consumers until mid February 2010. One multiplex at each main transmission station is to be converted from DVB-T to DVB-T2 as part of the UK's Digital Switch Over service to provide capacity for 4 HD stations. Areas like London are being allocated an additional frequency in advance of DSO planned for 2012 to allow over 50% of the population to be in range of the service by the time of the World Cup in June 2010. The first two stations broadcast were BBC HD and ITV HD, although the later will be publicly launched along with the Freesat HD version on 2 April 2010. Channel 4 HD is due to start broadcasts in later April 2010.
- Portugal's DVB-T service from Portugal Telecom will use H.264 for encoding both SD and HD transmissions starting in 2009.
- New Zealand's Freeview service launched its DVB-T transmissions in March 2008 using H.264/AVC.
- Australia's Nine HD service to launch its DVB-T transmissions on 26 November 2015 using H.264/AVC.
- Norway's NTV use H.264/AVC for its national DVB-T broadcasting started October 2007 in central southern areas of Norway. Norway is among the first to use MPEG-4/AVC exclusively in all its terrestrial television broadcasts, finished by November 2008. The analogue transponders were switched off in 2009
- Singapore's first over-the-air HDTV channel, MediaCorp HD5, uses H.264/AVC.
- Pan-Arab States first over-the-air national TV stations, uses H.264/AVC.
- Italy's DVB-T services from RAI (public broadcaster) and Mediaset (largest commercial broadcaster) use H.264/AVC for encoding HD transmissions since 2008.
- Thailand DVB-T2 services are uses H.264/AVC both SD and HD.

== Direct broadcast satellite TV services ==
- BBC HD uses H.264 for both its satellite (DVB-S) service on Astra 2D and its DTT (DVB-T2) Freeview HD service.
- ITV HD uses H.264 for both its satellite (DVB-S) service on Astra 2D and its DTT (DVB-T2) Freeview HD service.(United Kingdom)
- Česká televize uses H.264 for its satellite (DVB-S2) service on Astra 3B service (Karta ČT).
- DirecTV (in the United States)
- Dish Network (in the United States)
- Euro1080 (in Europe)
- InTV uses H.264 for its satellite (DVB-S2) service on ARSAT-2. (Argentina)
- Sun Direct DTH (in India)
- BIG TV (in India)
- HD5 (MediaCorp TV in Singapore)
- NTV Plus (in Russia)
- Sky Deutschland (in Germany)
- Sky HD (in the United Kingdom and Ireland) – the company's standard definition service continues to use MPEG-2
- Sky Italia (in Italy)
- SVT HD (Sveriges Television in Sweden)
- TuVes HD (in Chile)

== IPTV services ==
- Australian ISP Total Peripherals Group Internet is broadcasting in H.264 for its IPTV service.
- Canadian Telco Bell Aliant is now broadcasting in H.264 for its IPTV service.
- German Telco Deutsche Telekom is broadcasting in H.264 for its IPTV service.
- Inuk Networks the largest IPTV provider in the UK broadcasts in H.264.
- SGT S.A. - Polish cable operator in Silesia region for its IPTV service named JAMBOX.
- The BBC uses streamed H.264 files to deliver its BBC iPlayer catch-up services to FreesatHD set top boxes and televisions.
- Sri Lanka Telecom's PEO TV Platform the only IPTV service provider in Sri Lanka broadcasts in H.264/MPEG 4.

== Miscellaneous ==
- The 3rd Generation Partnership Project (3GPP) has approved the inclusion of H.264/AVC as an optional feature in release 6 of its mobile multimedia telephony services specifications.
- The North Atlantic Treaty Organisation (NATO) and the Motion Imagery Standards Board (MISB) of the United States Department of Defense (DoD) have adopted H.264/AVC as their preferred video codec for a broad variety of military applications.
- The Internet Engineering Task Force (IETF) has completed a payload packetization format (RFC 6184) for carrying H.264/AVC video using its Real-time Transport Protocol (RTP).
- The Internet Streaming Media Alliance (ISMA) has adopted H.264/AVC for its new ISMA 2.0 specifications.
- Based on ITU-T H.32x standards, H.264/AVC is widely used for videoconferencing. Procedures and control signals are defined in H.241. Essentially all new videoconferencing products now support it.
- The International Telecommunication Union-Radiocom. Sector (ITU-R) has adopted H.264/AVC in
  - ITU-R BT.1687 "Video bit-rate reduction for real-time distribution of large-screen digital imagery applications for presentation in a theatrical environment" and
  - ITU-R BT.1737 "Use of the ITU-T Recommendation H.264 (MPEG-4/AVC) video source-coding method to transport high definition TV programme material" for HDTV contribution, distribution, and satellite news gathering.
- In October 2005, Apple Inc began selling H.264-encoded videos over the Internet through their iTunes Music Store. Apple's iPhone and iPod Touch support H.264 Baseline Profile, Levels 2.1 and 3, at resolutions up to 480x320 or 640x480 and bitrates up to 1.5 Mbit/s and is capable of playing the YouTube video content.
- Google's Android platform for mobile devices natively supports H.264. On the T-Mobile G1, a Qualcomm MSM7200 CPU provides hardware decoding.
- Selected videos on the regular (non-mobile) Google YouTube website (including suitable quality videos uploaded after June 2007) are available in a selectable "High Quality" version which uses H.264, as well as having a higher bitrate and resolution.
- Adobe supports H.264 in its Flash Player.
- Microsoft supports H.264/AVC in its Windows 7, Internet Explorer 9, Silverlight, and Expression Encoder products
- The Australian Broadcasting Corporation offers streaming video online in a service called iView using H.264 video.
