= Over-the-top media services in India =

Online streaming platforms in India

There are at least 99 providers of over-the-top media services (OTT) in India, recognised by the Government of India which distribute streaming media or video on demand over the Internet.

== History and growth ==
The first dependent Indian OTT platform was BIGFlix, launched by Reliance Entertainment in 2008. In 2010 Digivive launched India's first OTT mobile app called nexGTv, which provides access to both live TV and on–demand content. nexGTV was the first app to live–stream Indian Premier League matches on smart phones and did so during 2013 and 2014. The livestream of the IPL since 2015, when rights were won, played an important role in the growth of another OTT platform, Hotstar (now JioHotstar) in India. OTT Platforms gained significant momentum in India when both DittoTV (Zee) and Sony Liv were launched in the Indian market around 2013.

Following the initial push of Regional OTT platforms like Aha, Hoichoi, Sun NXT, Planet Marathi, Chaupal & MX Player. The Indian OTT industry saw rapid transformation with the entry of global OTT companies such as Netflix and Amazon Prime Video into the Indian market in 2016. Replacement of this competition with global enterprises caused local rivals to innovate in both region and hyper-regional content.

=== Hotstar ===
Hotstar (now JioHotstar) is the most subscribed–to OTT platform in India, owned by JioStar as of February 2025, with around 500 million active users and over 650 million downloads. According to Hotstar's India Watch Report 2018, 96% of watch time on Hotstar comes from videos longer than 20 minutes, while one–third of Hotstar subscribers watch television shows. In 2019, Hotstar began investing ₹120 crore in generating original content such as "Hotstar Specials." 80% of the viewership on Hotstar comes from drama, movies and sports programs. Hotstar has the exclusive streaming rights of IPL in India.

=== Netflix ===
American streaming service Netflix entered India in January 2016. In April 2017, it was registered as a limited liability partnership (LLP) and started commissioning content. According to Morgan Stanley Research, Netflix had the highest average watch time of more than 120 minutes but viewer counts of around 20 million in July 2018. As of 2018, Netflix has six million subscribers, of which 5–6% are paid members.

India was not affected by Netflix's July 2018 increase in subscription rates for the US and Latin America. Netflix has stated its intent to invest ₹600 crore in the production of Indian original programming. In late 2018, Netflix bought 150,000 square feet (14,000 m^{2}) of office space in Bandra–Kurla Complex (BKC) in Mumbai as their head office. As of December 2018, Netflix has more than 40 employees in India.

=== Other OTT providers ===
Sun NXT is an Indian video on demand service run by Sun TV Network. It was launched in June 2017, streaming in the Tamil language and six other languages. The platform has more than 4,000 Tamil movies and 200 Tamil shows, as well as regional movies and shows. Sun NXT also streams a large library of its own Sun TV shows and movies.

Amazon Prime Video was launched in 2016. The platform has 2,300 titles available including 2,000 movies and about 400 shows. It has announced that it will invest ₹20 billion in creating original content in India. Besides English, Prime Video is available in six Indian languages as of December 2018. Amazon India launched Amazon Prime Music in February 2018.

Eros Now, an OTT platform launched by Eros International, has the most content among the OTT providers in India, including over 12,000 films, 100,000 music tracks and albums, and 100 TV shows. Eros Now was named the Best OTT Platform of the Year 2019 at the British Asian Media Awards. It has 211.5 million registered users and 36.2 million paying subscribers as of September 2020.

In February 2020, Aha OTT platform was launched, broadcasting exclusively Telugu content.

In 2021, Planet Marathi became the first OTT platform dedicated to Marathi content in India, including web-series, films, music, theater, fiction and non-fiction reality shows. It is available for both Android and iOS mobile devices along with Android TV and Amazon Fire TV devices. Bollywood actress Madhuri Dixit helped launch the platform.

With rising interest for Korean dramas, Rakuten Viki saw its biggest jump of web traffic from India in 2020 due to the COVID-19 lockdown, which led to ad localization on the platform.

The OTT market in fiscal year 2020 was estimated to be worth $1.7 billion.

=== SonyLIV and ZEE5 ===
In December 2021, Sony and Zee announced their merger, and announced plans to merge their OTT platforms. The merger was called off.

=== OTT services launched as Amazon Prime video channels ===
The list is by alphabetical order, not by rank or popularity.

Name	Parent	Active years	Languages	Notes/Ref.
Acorn TV	AMC Global Media (83%) RLJ Entertainment (17%)	2011–present	English	
AMC+	AMC Global Media	2020–present	English	
ShortsTV	Shorts International (75%) AMC Networks International (25%)	2006–present	English	

== Content regulation ==
Due to the absence of any rules and regulation regarding OTT content, many OTT providers were accused of showing nudity, vulgarity and obscenity and hurting Hindu religious sentiments in their shows. Series which were the focus of controversy include Four More Shots Please!, Tandav, Paatal Lok, Sacred Games, Mirzapur Lust stories franchise, Rana Naidu. Thank You for Coming, and Annapoorani (2023).

According to media reports, between 2018 and 2024, some OTT platforms emerged which started showing porn in the form of web series. Both the Supreme Court and Delhi High Court say that OTT regulation is necessary.

=== OTT regulation ===
- On 25 Feb 2021, Indian govt introduced self-regulation rules for OTT platforms to stop obscene content and abusive language.
- On 19 March 2023, I&B minister Anurag Thakur said that self regulation does not mean that OTT should show obscenity and nudity.
- On 15 April 2023, I&B Secretary Apurva Chandra has said because of the government's soft-touch regulations on OTT industry have led to the creation of content that is undesirable and vulgar.
- On 26 April 2023, MIB India said that if nudity and obscenity is seen on any OTT platform, strict action will be taken against it.
- On 16 May 2023, Don't show obscene content, parliamentary panel told to Netflix and Amazon Prime Video.
- On 20 June 2023, the government told Netflix, Disney+ Hotstar and all other streaming services that their content should be independently reviewed for obscenity and violence before being shown online.
- On 27 June 2023, DPCGC took punitive action against Ullu for streaming obscene content and asked them to remove all their explicit shows or remove all adult scenes within 15 days.
- On 18 July 2023, Anarug Thakur said in a meeting with all OTT stakeholders that demeaning Indian culture will not be tolerated. OTT can't show vulgarity and nudity in the garb of 'creative expression'.The cited sources do not mention vulgarity - they say this was about demeaning Indian culture/society.
- On 22 August 2023, Indian government assured that it will bring rules and regulation to regulate vulgar and obscene content on social media and OTT platforms.
- On 10 November 2023, MIB India introduces the 'Broadcasting Service Regulation Bill', which included Programme code with Content Evaluation Committee(CEC) for every OTT platforms. Currently public consultation is ongoing till 15 January 2024.
- The draft bill mandates that all OTT streaming platforms can only broadcast those web series or content, which will be duly certified by Content Evaluation Committee(CEC).
- On 14 March 2024, the Ministry of Information and Broadcasting banned over 18 OTT apps from Google play store and suspended all of their 57 social media accounts, as well as closed nineteen streaming websites. The banned platforms were MoodX, Prime Play, Hunters, Besharams, Rabbit movies, Voovi, Fugi, Mojflix, Chikooflix, Nuefliks, Xtramood, NeonX VIP, X Prime, Tri Flicks, Uncut Adda, Dreams Films, Hot Shots VIP, and Yessma.
- On 25 July 2025, the Ministry of Information and Broadcasting banned from 25 OTT apps from Google play store and suspended all of their 40 social media accounts, as well as 26 closed streaming websites. The banned platforms were include ALTT, Ullu, Big Shots App, Desiflix, Boomex, NeonX VIP, Navarasa Lite, Gulab App, Kangan App, Bull App, ShowHit, Jalva App, Wow Entertainment, Look Entertainment, Hitprime, Fugi, Feneo, ShowX, Sol Talkies, Adda TV, HotX VIP, Hulchul App, MoodX, Triflicks, and Mojflix.
- On 24 February 2026, the Ministry of Information and Broadcasting banned from 5 OTT apps from Google play store and suspended all of their 5 social media accounts, as well as 5 closed streaming websites. The banned platforms were include Feel App, Digi Movieplex, Jugnu App, MoodX VIP, and Koyal Playpro.

=== Legal action ===
Currently OTT is regulated under the IT Rules 2021, which clearly stated that 'No content that is prohibited by law at the time being force can be Publishing or transmitted'. MIB has continuously taking action on OTT platform, who has violating the IT Act 67A, which prevent Publishing and transmitting obscene materials.

- Pornography in India is restricted and illegal in all form including print media, electronic media, and digital media (OTT).
- Several websites and OTT Platforms has been banned by the Cyber Crime Branch for streaming Pornographic and obscene content on their platform.
- The owners of several OTT platforms on which obscene content was streamed were arrested and all their bank accounts were also frozen.

=== Judicial opinion ===
- Supreme Court of India said that, OTT regulations is a necessity as some even showing nudity and pornography.
- In March 2023, the Delhi High Court had said framing rules and regulations to regulate the content on social media and OTT platforms needs urgent attention.

=== Criticism ===
IAMAI again pledges self-regulation for OTT platforms. Content creators and producers in India, as mentioned in the report, already face many challenges, including the multiplicity of legislation and forums for filing complaints. The study paper by The Dialogue Internet and IAMAI found that these challenges lead to compliance uncertainties, self-censorship, and unwarranted economic burden. A private association of current affairs and news television broadcasters has expressed strong reservations against the Draft Broadcasting Services (Regulation) Bill, 2023, which it warned would have a "chilling effect" on the freedom of speech and expression, News Broadcasters & Digital Association (NBDA) said in a submission to the information and broadcasting ministry.

== List of OTT platforms in India ==
The list is by alphabetical order, not by rank or popularity.

Name	Parent	Active years	Languages	Notes/Ref.
Aao NXT	Kaustav Dreamworks Pvt. Ltd.	2020–present	Odia, Bengali, Hindi	
Addatimes	Surinder Films	2016–present	Bengali, Odia, Hindi	
Aha	Arha Media & Broadcasting Pvt. Ltd.	2020–present	Telugu, Tamil	
Airtel XStream	Bharti Airtel	2019–present	Hindi, English, Tamil, Telugu, Kannada, Malayalam, Marathi, Bengali, Gujarati, Punjabi, Odia, Assamese, Urdu	
Amazon MX Player	Amazon	2018–present	Bhojpuri, Hindi, Tamil, Telugu, Marathi, Bengali, Malayalam, Kannada, Punjabi, Odia, Gujarati, English	
Amazon Prime Video	Amazon	2016–present	Marathi, English, Hindi, Tamil, Telugu, Bengali, Malayalam, Kannada, Odia, Punjabi, Gujarati	
Apple TV+	Apple Inc	2019–present	English, Hindi	
Arre	UDigital	2015–present	Hindi, English	
Atrangii	Atrangii	2022–present	Hindi, Tamil, Telugu	
Bongo OTT	Bongo India	2013-present	Bengali	
Chaupal	Bosna Digital Pvt. Ltd.	2021–present	Punjabi, Haryanvi, Bhojpuri	
CSpace	Government of Kerala	2024–present	Malayalam	
Dangal Play	Enterr10 Television Pvt. Ltd.	2022–present	Hindi, Bhojpuri, Bengali, Odia, Marathi	
EORTV	EORTV Media Pvt. Ltd.	2020-present	Hindi, English, Marathi, Gujarati	
Epic On	IN10 Media Pvt. Ltd.	2014-present	Hindi, English, Bhojpuri, Telugu, Kannada, Malayalam, Tamil, Punjabi, Haryanvi	
Eros Now	Eros International	2015–present	Hindi, English, Bengali, Bhojpuri, Marathi, Malayalam, Tamil, Telugu, Punjabi, Gujarati, Kannada, Kashmiri, Urdu	Titled as 'Best OTT Platform of the Year 2019' at the British Asian Media Awards
ETV Win	ETV Network	2019–present	English, Telugu	
Hayu	NBCUniversal	2016–present	English	
Hari Om	Hari Om	2024–present	Hindi	Mythological and devotional content
Hippiix App	Hippiix	2020-present	Bengali, Hindi	
Hoichoi App	Shree Venkatesh Films	2017–present	Bengali, Hindi	
Hungama Play	Hungama Digital Media Entertainment	2015–present	Bhojpuri, Hindi, English, Tamil, Telugu	
JioHotstar	JioStar	2015–present	Hindi, English, Tamil, Marathi, Telugu, Malayalam, Bengali, Kannada, Odia	India's most subscribed OTT platform
JioTV	Jio Platforms	2016–present	Assamese, Bengali, Bhojpuri, English, French, Gujarati, Hindi, Kannada, Malayalam, Marathi, Nepali, Odia, Punjabi, Tamil, Telugu, Urdu	Only available for Jio Subscribers
Kabla One	Seven Colors Broadcasting Pvt. Ltd.	2025-present	Punjabi, Haryanvi, Hindi, English	
Kanccha Lanka	Glass Dreamz Entertainment Pvt. Ltd.	2021–present	Odia	
Klikk	Angel Television Pvt. Ltd.	2020–present	Bengali, Bhojpuri, Hindi	
Kutingg	Balaji Telefilms	2025–present	Hindi, English, Tamil, Telugu, Arabic	
Lionsgate Play	Lionsgate	2020–present	English, Hindi, Tamil, Telugu, Marathi, Bengali, Kannada, Malayalam	
Mahua Play	Lavitra Communications Pvt Ltd	2024-present	Bhojpuri, Hindi, English	
MaskTV App	Weltretter Projects and Consultants Private Limited	2022-present	Hindi, English, Tamil, Telugu, Malayalam	
Mastii App	Mastii	2024-present	Hindi, English	
ManoramaMAX	Malayala Manorama TV Ltd.	2019–present	Malayalam	Malayalam content
Mubi	Mubi Inc.	2019–present	English, Hindi, Tamil, Marathi, Telugu, Bengali, Malayalam, Kannada	
Netflix	Netflix Inc.	2016–present	English, Hindi, Tamil, Marathi, Telugu, Bengali, Malayalam, Kannada	
NammaFlix	NammaFlix	2020–present	Kannada	
Niri9	Niri Media Pvt. Ltd.	2020–present	Hindi, Bengali, Assamese, Mishing, Bhojpuri	
OneTheatre	GTPL KCBPL	2025–present	Bengali	
Platform8	Channel Eight Virtual Estudios Ltd.	2021–present	Bengali	
Planet Marathi	Planet Marathi	2021–present	Marathi	Marathi Content
Prideplex	Pride East Entertainments Pvt. Ltd.	2022–present	Assamese, Hindi, English	
PTC Play	G Next Media Pvt. Ltd.	2019-present	Punjabi, Bhojpuri, Hindi, English	
Raj Digital TV App	Raj Television Network	2022-present	Tamil, Telugu, Kannada, Malayalam	
Ratri	Flowing Water Films Pvt. Ltd.	2023–present	Hindi, Telugu, Bengali	
ReelDrama	ReelDrama Production Pvt. Ltd.	2021–present	Assamese	
Saina Play	Saina Infotainments	2019–present	Malayalam, Tamil	Malayalam content
ShemarooMe	Shemaroo Entertainment	2019–present	Hindi, English, Marathi, Telugu, Tamil, Malayalam, Gujarati, Punjabi, Bengali, Kannada, Urdu	
SonyLIV	Culver Max Entertainment	2013–present	Hindi, Telugu, English, Tamil, Marathi, Bengali, Malayalam, Kannada, Punjabi	
Stage App	Stage Technologies Pvt. Ltd.	2019-present	Haryanvi, Rajasthani, Bhojpuri, Gujarati	
Sun NXT	Sun Group	2017–present	Hindi, English, Tamil, Telugu, Malayalam, Kannada, Bengali, and Marathi	
Sun Direct GO	Sun Direct	2023- present	Hindi, English, Tamil, Telugu, Kannada, Malayalam, Marathi, Bengali, Gujarati, Punjabi and more	Sun Direct
Tarang Plus	Odisha Television Network	2019–present	Odia	
Tata Play	Tata Group	2019–present	Hindi, English, Bengali, Malayalam, Marathi, Odia, Punjabi, Tamil, and Telugu	
Tentkotta	Tentkotta	2014–present	Tamil	
TVFPlay	Contagious Online Media Network Private Limited	2015–present	Hindi, Tamil, Telugu	
Ultra Jhakaas	Ultra Media & Entertainment	2023–present	Marathi	Marathi content
Ultra Play OTT	Ultra Media & Entertainment	2024–present	Hindi	Hindi content
Ultra Gaane	Ultra Media & Entertainment	2024–present	Hindi	Hindi content
Veto App	Veto Streaming Media Pvt. Ltd.	2025-present	Hindi, English, Bhojpuri, Marathi, Malayalam, Punjabi, Tamil	
Viki	Rakuten	2010–present	English	Web and mobile
Vuclip	PCCW	2008–present	Hindi, Tamil, Telugu	
WaahPlay	Waah Play Entertainment	2025-present	Hindi, Punjabi	
Waves	Prasar Bharati	2024–present	Hindi, English, Telugu, Tamil, Kannada, Malayalam, Bengali, Gujarati, Marathi	
Watcho App	Dish TV India Ltd.	2019-present	Hindi, English, Tamil, Telugu, Kannada, Malayalam, Marathi, Bengali, Gujarati, Punjabi, Odia, Assamese, Urdu	
YuppTV	YuppTV	2007–present	Hindi, Tamil, Telugu, Marathi, Kannada	
ZEE5	Zee Entertainment Enterprises	2018–present	Bhojpuri, Hindi, Tamil, Telugu, Marathi, Bengali, Malayalam, Kannada, Punjabi, Odia, Gujarati, English	

== List of podcast platforms in India ==
Name	Free access	Selective streaming	Lossless (Hi-Fi)	Track download	Tracks (millions)	Active users (millions)	Paying users (millions)	First launched	Login required
Amazon Music	No	Yes	Yes	Yes	50 (Unlimited), 2 (Prime Music)	16			Yes
Apple Music	No	Yes	Yes	Yes	60	60	60	June 2015	Yes
Gaana	Yes	Yes	No	Yes					Yes
Hungama	Yes	Yes	No	Yes					Yes
JioSaavn	Yes	Yes	No	Yes	30	20			Yes
SoundCloud	Yes	Yes	Partial	Limited	200+	175			No
Spotify	Yes	Yes	No	Yes	50	289	130	October 2008	Yes
YouTube Music	Yes	Yes	No	Yes	50			November 2015	No

== See also ==
- Streaming television
- Streaming media
- List of streaming media services
- Multichannel television in the United States
- Golden Age of Television (2000s–present)
