= GPS-aided GEO augmented navigation (GAGAN) =

Regional satellite navigation system

GAGAN
GPS-aided GEO augmented navigation
- Type: Regional satellite-based augmentation system
- Developers: ISRO; Airports Authority of India (AAI)
- Accuracy: 1.5 m or 4 ft 11 in (horizontal), 2.5 m or 8 ft 2 in (vertical)
- Launched: 2001
- Orbital radius: 26,600 km (approx) GEO
- Max operational life: 15 years
- Fully operational by: 2013–14
- Project cost: ₹774 crore (US$80 million)

The GPS-aided GEO augmented navigation (GAGAN) is an implementation of a regional satellite-based augmentation system (SBAS) by the Government of India. It is a system to improve the accuracy of a GNSS receiver by providing reference signals. The Airports Authority of India (AAI)'s efforts towards implementation of operational SBAS can be viewed as the first step towards introduction of modern communication, navigation and surveillance / air traffic management system over the Indian airspace.

The project has established 15 Indian Reference Stations (INRES), 2 Indian Master Control Centre (INMCC) and 3 Indian Land Uplink Station (INLUS) and installation of all associated software and communication links. It will be able to help pilots to navigate in the Indian airspace by an accuracy of 3 m (9.8 ft) and will be helpful for landing aircraft in marginal weather and difficult approaches like Mangalore International and Kushok Bakula Rimpochee airports.

== Implementation ==
The ₹774 crore (US$80 million) project was deployed in three phases through 2008 by the Airports Authority of India with the help of the Indian Space Research Organisation's (ISRO) technology and space support. The goal is to provide navigation system for all phases of flight over the Indian airspace and in the adjoining area. It is applicable to safety-to-life operations, and meets the performance requirements of international civil aviation regulatory bodies.

The space component became available after the launch of the GAGAN payload on the GSAT-8 communication satellite, which was successfully launched. This payload was also part of the GSAT-4 satellite that was lost when the Geosynchronous Satellite Launch Vehicle (GSLV) failed during launch in April 2010. A final system acceptance test was conducted during June 2012 followed by system certification during July 2013.

All aircraft being registered in India after 1 July 2021 are mandated to be outfitted with GAGAN equipment. The first aircraft to land using GAGAN system was an ATR-72 aircraft of IndiGo. The landing was carried out 29 April 2022 in Kishangarh Airport, Rajasthan.

In 2024, reports suggested that all the new aircraft that were ordered by Air India and IndiGo will be equipped with GAGAN systems whereas many of the turboprop aircraft in India like ATR-72 and De Havilland Canada Dash 8. The GAGAN systems will be primarily operationalised in smaller airports lacking instrument landing system (ILS) whereas larger airports with ILS will keep it as a backup option in case of non availability of such infrastructures.

On 27 June 2026, an Airbus A320 operated by IndiGo successfully landed using GAGAN equipment at the Udaipur airport.

== Technology demonstration ==
The first phase of the system was the GAGAN-TDS (Technology Demonstration System). TDS was successfully completed during 2007 by installing eight Indian Reference Stations (INRESs) at eight Indian airports and linked to the Master Control Centre (MCC) located near Bengaluru. Preliminary system acceptance testing has been successfully completed in December 2010. The ground segment for GAGAN, which has been put up by the Raytheon, has fifteen reference stations scattered across the country. Two mission control centres, along with associated uplink stations, have been set up at Kundalahalli in Bengaluru. One more control centre and uplink station were expected to be established at Bengaluru and Delhi. As a part of the programme, a network of eighteen total electron content (TEC) monitoring stations were installed at various locations in India to study and analyse the behaviour of the ionosphere over the Indian region. The FSAT (Final System Acceptance Test) for GAGAN-TDS was completed on 14-15th August, 2007 using the signal-in-space (SIS) from INMARSAT-4 F1.

GAGAN's TDS signal in space provides a 3 m (9.8 ft) accuracy as against the requirement of 7.6 m (25 ft). Flight inspection of GAGAN signal is being carried out at Calicut International, Rajiv Gandhi International, Dr. Babasaheb Ambedkar International and Kempegowda International airports and the results have been satisfactory so far.

=== Study of Ionosphere ===
One essential component of the GAGAN project is the study of the ionospheric behaviour over the Indian region. This has been specially taken up in view of the uncertain nature of the behaviour of the ionosphere in the region. The ion content in the airspace increases with the increase of solar activities and peaks at around 2 pm IST. The study will lead to the optimisation of the algorithms for the ionospheric corrections in the region.

To study the ionospheric behaviour more effectively over entire Indian airspace, Indian universities and research and development labs, which are involved in the development of regional based ionotropic model for GAGAN, have suggested nine more TEC stations.

According to a report, however, told the problems faced due to this can be eliminated by using "dual-frequency multi-constellation (DFMC) GAGAN approach".

== Operational structure ==
To begin implementing a satellite-based augmentation system over the Indian airspace, Wide Area Augmentation System (WAAS) codes for L1 frequency and L5 frequency were obtained from the United States Air Force and the United States Department of Defense in November 2001 and March 2005. United States defence contractor Raytheon has taken part in the project to establish the required systems. The system will uses:

1. 15 Indian Reference Stations (INRES) located in Delhi, Ahmedabad, Bengaluru, Thiruvananthapuram, Kolkata, Guwahati, Port Blair, Jammu, Gaya, Jaisalmer, Nagpur, Dibrugarh, Bhubaneswar, Porbandar and Goa.
2. 2 Indian Master Control Centre (INMCC) at Bengaluru.
3. 3 Indian Land Uplink Station (INLUS); two in Bengaluru and one in Delhi.

=== Satellites ===
There are two operational satellites excluding one as a backup

- GSAT-8 is an Indian geostationary satellite, which was successfully launched using Ariane 5 on 21 May 2011 and is positioned in Geostationary orbit at 55 degrees E longitude.
- GSAT-10 is envisaged to augment the growing need of Ku and C-band transponders and carries 12 Ku Band, 12 C Band and 12 Extended C Band transponders and a GAGAN payload. The spacecraft employs the standard I-3K structure with power handling capability of around 6 kW with a lift off mass of 3,400 kg (7,500 lb). GSAT-10 was successfully launched by Ariane 5 on 29 September 2012.
- GSAT-15 carries 24 Ku band transponders with India coverage beam and a GAGAN payload. It was successfully launched on 10 November 2015, 21:34:07 UTC, completing the constellation. This satellite is used as a spare and will be used in emergency scenarios.

== Technology Integration ==
GAGAN is now in operational phase and is compatible with other SBAS systems such as the Wide Area Augmentation System (WAAS), the European Geostationary Navigation Overlay Service (EGNOS) and the MTSAT Satellite Augmentation System (MSAS) and will provide seamless air navigation service across regional boundaries. While the ground segment consists of fifteen reference stations and a master control centre, which will have sub systems such as data communication network, SBAS correction and verification system, operations and maintenance system, performance monitoring display and payload simulator, Indian land uplinking stations will have dish antenna assembly. The space segment will consist of one geo-navigation transponder.

== Effective flight-management system ==
A GAGAN-based flight management system will be able to save time and money of operators by controlling climb, descent, and engine performance profiles. The utilization of operator-preferred trajectories will increase, leading to increased efficiency and flexibility from the FMS. It will enhance access to airports and airspace in any weather conditions and enhance compliance with environmental and obstacle clearance requirements. By establishing more exact terminal area procedures with parallel routes and environmentally optimized airspace corridors, it will also improve reliability and decrease delays.

- GAGAN will increase safety by using a three-dimensional approach operation with course guidance to the runway, which will reduce the risk of controlled flight into terrain i.e., an accident whereby an airworthy aircraft, under pilot control, inadvertently flies into terrain, an obstacle, or water.
- GAGAN will also offer high position accuracies over a wide geographical area like the Indian airspace. These positions accuracies will be simultaneously available to 80 civilian and more than 200 non-civilian airports and airfields and will facilitate an increase in the number of airports to 500 as planned. These position accuracies can be further enhanced with ground-based, augmentation system.

== Developments ==
The first GAGAN transmitter was integrated into the GSAT-4 geostationary satellite, and had a goal of being operational in 2008. Following a series of delays, GSAT-4 was launched on 15 April 2010, however it failed to reach orbit after the third stage of the Geosynchronous Satellite Launch Vehicle Mk.II that was carrying it malfunctioned.

In 2009, Raytheon had won an $82 million contract. It was mainly dedicated to modernise Indian air navigation system. The vice president of Command and Control Systems, Raytheon Network Centric Systems, Andy Zogg commented:

GAGAN will be the world's most advanced air navigation system and further reinforces India's leadership in the forefront of air navigation. GAGAN will greatly improve safety, reduce congestion and enhance communications to meet India's growing air traffic management needs

In 2012, the Defence Research and Development Organisation (DRDO) received a "miniaturised version" of the device with all the features from Global Positioning Systems (GPS) and global navigation satellite systems (GNSS). The module weighing just 17 g (0.60 oz), can be used in multiple platforms ranging from aircraft (e.g. winged or rotor-craft) to small boats, ships. Reportedly, it can also assist "survey applications". It is a cost-efficient device and can be of "tremendous" civilian use. The navigation output is composed of GPS, GLONASS and GPS+GLONASS position, speed and time data. According to a statement released by the DRDO, G3oM is a state-of-the-art technology receiver, integrating Indian GAGAN as well as both global positioning system and GLONASS systems.

According to Deccan chronicle:

G. Satheesh Reddy, associate director of the city-based Research Centre Imarat, said the product is bringing about a quantum leap in the area of GNSS technology and has paved the way for highly miniaturised GNSS systems for the future.

On 30 December 2012, the Directorate General of Civil Aviation (DGCA), India provisionally certified the GPS-aided geo-augmented navigation (GAGAN) system to RNP0.1 (required navigation performance, 0.1 nautical miles [0.19 km; 0.12 mi]) service level. The certification enabled aircraft fitted with SBAS equipment to use GAGAN signal in space for navigation purposes.

=== Indian regional navigation satellite system (NAVIC) ===
The Indian government has stated that it intends to use the experience of creating the GAGAN system to enable the creation of an autonomous regional navigation system called the Indian Regional Navigation Satellite System (IRNSS), operationally known as NavIC (acronym for Navigation with Indian Constellation).

IRNSS-1 Indian regional navigational satellite system (IRNSS)-1, the first of the seven satellites of the Indian Regional Navigation Satellite System constellation, carries a navigation payload and a C-band ranging transponder. The spacecraft employs an optimised I-1K structure with a power handling capability of around 1660W and a lift off mass of 1,425 kg (3,142 lb), and is designed for a nominal mission life of 10 years. The first satellite of IRNSS constellation was launched onboard Polar Satellite Launch Vehicle (PSLV) (C22) on 1 July 2012. While the full constellation was planned to be realised during 2014 time frame, launch of subsequent satellites was delayed.

Currently all seven satellites are in orbit but in 2017 it was announced that all three rubidium based atomic clocks on board IRNSS-1A had failed, mirroring similar failures in the Galileo constellation. The first failure occurred in July 2016, following which two other clocks also failed. This rendered the satellite somewhat redundant and required replacement. Although the satellite still performs other functions, the data is coarse, and thus cannot be used for accurate measurements. ISRO plans to replace it with IRNSS-1H in July or August 2017.

Two more clocks in the navigational system had started showing signs of abnormality, thereby taking the total number of failed clocks to five.

As a precaution to extend the operational life of navigation satellite, ISRO is running only one rubidium atomic clock instead of two in the remaining six satellites. Each satellite has three clocks, therefore a total of 27 clocks for all satellites in the system (including standby satellites). The clocks of both IRNSS and GALILEO were supplied by SpectraTime. ISRO replaced the atomic clocks in two standby NavIC satellites. The setback comes at a time when IRNSS is yet to start commercial operations.

== Applications ==
Karnataka Forest Department has used GAGAN to build a new, accurate and publicly available satellite based database of its forestlands. This is a followup to the Supreme Court directive to states to update and put up their respective forest maps. The geospatial database of forestlands pilot has used data from the Cartosat-2 satellite. The maps are meant to rid authorities of ambiguities related to forest boundaries and give clarity to forest administrators, revenue officials as also the public, according to R.K. Srivastava, chief conservator of forests (headquarters).

The Indian National Centre for Ocean Information Services (INCOIS) along with AAI has launched a new satellite-based GEMINI (Gagan Enabled Mariner's Instrument for Navigation and Information) system that will alert deep-sea fishermen of upcoming disasters. The GEMINI app on the cellphone decodes the signals from GEMINI device and alerts the user on imminent threats like cyclones, high waves, strong winds along with PFZ and search and rescue mission.

Various Indian manufactured missiles including the BrahMos will use GAGAN for guidance.

== See also ==
- GNSS augmentation
