= A la carte pay television =

Pricing model for pay television services

A la carte pay television (from the French à la carte, "from the menu"), also known as pick-and-pay, is a pricing model for pay television services in which customers subscribe to individual television channels. This approach contrasts with the prevailing bundling model, where channels are grouped into packages offered on an all-or-nothing basis.

The term has also been applied to the practice of cord cutting—relying on television services delivered over the internet—and to the selection of multiple video on demand subscription services, each chosen individually by the consumer and accessible through a single billing and over-the-top viewing platform.

== Availability ==
A la carte pricing has been an often-requested but seldom-delivered option for cable and satellite distribution services. In the U.S., proponents have argued that the model would deliver lower prices, while opponents maintain that bundling offers more customer value and program diversity.

=== Canada ===
In Canada, a la carte service has been required by law since December 2016. The legislation dates back to at least 2012 when the Canadian Radio-television and Telecommunications Commission (CRTC) ruled that consumers should be able to subscribe to individual channels, but the fewer channels purchased, the higher the cost for each one. No timeline was set. In October 2013, Industry Minister James Moore said that Canadians "shouldn't have to pay for bundled television channels they don't watch" and indicated that the country's Conservative government would make it easier for subscribers to purchase channels individually.

On December 1, 2016, as per policy implemented by the CRTC on March 19, 2015, all television providers in Canada were required to offer an a la carte scheme. Channels were typically priced between $4 and $7, making bundled packages the better deal for all but the most frugal subscribers. Consumers were incredulous about the offerings, but analysts were not surprised, arguing that the industry would be expected to protect its bottom line. While the CRTC required a basic offering of local television services and mandated channels costing $25 or less, it did not regulate the pricing of individual stations.

=== India ===
In India, terrestrial and free-to-air television is free with no monthly payments, while cable, direct to home (DTH) and IPTV require a monthly payment that varies depending on how many channels a subscriber chooses to pay for. Channels are sold in packages/bouquets/bundles or a la carte. All television service providers are required, by law, to provide a la carte selection of channels. India is the first country in the world to couple a la carte pricing with a price cap. Multiple-system operator (MSO) Hathway was the first to offer channels on an a la carte basis in India, announcing such a service on September 3, 2003.

On September 3, 2007, the Telecom Regulatory Authority of India (TRAI) issued the Telecommunication (Broadcasting and Cable Services) Interconnection (Fourth Amendment) Regulation 2007, which went into law on December 1; the rules require all broadcasters to offer channels on an a la carte basis. The regulation states, "All broadcasters will compulsorily offer all their channels on a la carte basis to DTH operators. Additionally, they may also offer bouquets, but they will not compel any DTH operator to include the entire bouquet in any package being offered by DTH operators to their subscribers". Prior to the regulation, only customers in areas covered by the conditional access system (CAS), and cable systems providing the services, had the option of choosing to buy only the channels they were interested in. TRAI intervened after DTH operators complained that broadcasters were forcing them to carry channels that they did not want. In the Telecommunication (Broadcasting and Cable) Services (Second) Tariff (Eighth Amendment) Order, 2007 (a revision of the earlier regulation issued on October 4, 2007), broadcasters were ordered to offer all channels on an a la carte basis to cable providers. Like the earlier regulation concerning DTH operators, this order took effect on December 1, 2007. It also permitted packages to be offered along with a la carte.

Several broadcasters, such as Star India, Zee Turner, Set Discovery and Sun TV, challenged TRAI's order in the Telecom Disputes Settlement Appellate Tribunal (TDSAT). On January 15, 2008, TDSAT refused to grant a stay on the appeal challenging TRAI's directive; TDSAT overruled the broadcasters' objections. The agency later set aside TRAI's December 2007 tariff regime. TRAI challenged TDSAT's order in the Supreme Court, and stated in proceedings on July 22, 2010 that "in the analog, non-addressable environment, the authority is of the view that a la carte should not be made mandatory at the wholesale level as technological constraints in any case make it impossible for the benefits of a la carte provisioning to be passed on to subscribers".

TRAI ordered that pay television customers in India must be given a free choice of channels rather than be forced to choose package deals, enforcing a January 2011 deadline to implement the changes. The order stated, "Every service provider providing broadcasting services or cable services to its subscribers using an addressable system shall offer all pay channels to its subscribers on a la carte basis and shall specify the maximum retail price for each pay channel". Tata Sky, Airtel digital TV, Videocon d2h, In Digital and Reliance Digital TV launched a la carte options in January 2011.

=== United States ===
In the United States, the precedent for distributors bundling channels, rather than offering them a la carte, began shortly after passage of the Cable Television Consumer Protection and Competition Act of 1992, which enabled broadcasters to seek compensation from distributors in exchange for retransmitting a signal. Larger broadcasters negotiated not for higher fees, but for inclusion of their newer, lesser known, non-terrestrial channels. Fox, for example, obtained distribution for FX; NBC for CNBC. Hence, bundling has not been just a marketing choice for distributors, but a contractual obligation.

Industry resistance to a la carte programming in the U.S. has been entrenched even during downturns. In 2011, for example, a combined loss of 1.2 million subscribers to Comcast and Time Warner Cable prompted rumors that program distributors themselves would push to unbundle at least some of their services. Cable analyst Craig Moffett argued that a modified a la carte model, consisting of smaller programming tiers, was more economically feasible for distributors and customers alike. At the time, Time Warner Cable experimented with such an offering in a limited trial, called TV Essentials. IDC analyst Gary Ireland called such skinny bundles "simply a placeholder for a la carte" and predicted that consumer demand for the pricing scheme would eventually triumph. At the end of 2015, 20.4% of U.S. households had either dropped cable service or never subscribed in the first place.

==== The debate ====
===== Support =====
The case for a la carte has centered on cost savings for subscribers. In 2006, Kevin Martin, then chairman of the Federal Communications Commission (FCC) and one of the best known advocates for the pricing scheme, presented a report to Congress arguing that, on average, consumers would save 13% on their monthly cable subscription rates if they were able to subscribe only to channels that they actually watched.

In May 2013, U.S. Senator John McCain introduced legislation that would have encouraged, through regulatory incentives, programmers and distributors to offer a la carte services. He cited an FCC survey finding that the cost of expanded basic cable has effectively risen from about US$25 a month in 1995 to over $54, greatly exceeding inflation. As predicted at the time by observers and McCain himself, the legislation did not pass.

On June 15, 2019, Maine enacted legislation that requires cable system operators to "offer subscribers the option of purchasing access to cable channels, or programs on cable channels, individually." A pair of lawsuits aimed at blocking the measure soon followed. Plaintiffs for the first include Comcast, Fox, CBS and Disney, who argue that Federal law supersedes state legislation in dictating 'how cable programming is presented to consumers." The second lawsuit was filed by the NCTA, which represents broadband and cable services.

===== Opposition =====
Opposition to a la carte programming has centered in part on program diversity. When channels are bundled into large subscription tiers, less popular niche channels are more likely to survive because their cost is borne by both viewers and non-viewers, alike. In 2008, the National Congress of Black Women and fourteen other groups argued that case in a letter to the FCC, writing that a la carte pricing would "wreak havoc" on programming diversity. Televangelist Jerry Falwell opposed a la carte pricing for similar reasons, fearing that the pricing model would force Christian broadcasters off the air, although not all religious broadcasters agreed.

A la carte opponents have also cited economics, arguing that the perceived cost savings of a la carte pricing would be illusory for most subscribers and dramatically reduce revenues for programmers. A December 2013 analysis of the U.S. market by investment bank and asset management firm Needham & Company concluded an a la carte scheme would cut $80 billion to $113 billion of consumer value from the industry, cost at least $45 billion in advertising, and eliminate at least 124 channels and some 1.4 million media-related jobs. The firm based its estimates on the assumption that the average annual operating cost of an entertainment cable channel is $280 million, which would require at least 165,000 viewers to break even. Based on 2012 viewership, that would leave about 56 channels standing. Analyst Laura Martin recommended that the current business model of bundled tiered subscriptions be kept with no changes.

In a May 2014 New York Times column, Josh Barro pointed to academic research concluding that an a la carte system would not benefit customers. A typical subscriber, he wrote, would pay "slightly more on cable under an unbundled system, while watching slightly fewer channels." A 2011 Stanford University study cited by Barro simulated a 49-channel subscription bundle being switched to an la carte scheme. The researchers concluded that subscribers would pay 103.0% more in fees passed on by distributors, while consumer welfare would likely be worse, changing between -5.4% and 0.2%. Part of the reason is efficiency: some distribution costs are fixed whether a distributor provides a few channels or many. If fewer people subscribe, the base subscription rate is likely to go up. In addition, programmers would receive less revenue in carriage fees and advertising revenues, and would look to its remaining viewers to make up the difference. However, some subscribers would benefit from a la carte, including those who have opted out of bundled channels, but might subscribe to just a few, as well as subscribers with no interest in sports. Casual sports fans, on the other hand, could pay a higher rate.

===== Sports programming =====
By 2013, the outsized cost of sports programming paid by distributors and passed on to subscribers had influenced the debate. The Needham study maintained that the creation of a separate sports tier would reduce industry revenues by $13 billion. Cable pioneer John C. Malone stated that, for subscribers uninterested in television sports, "runaway sports rights" costs amounted to "a high tax".

The most pronounced example was the national sports network ESPN, whose monthly per-subscriber fee charged to distributors in 2013 averaged $5.54, more than four times that of the second most costly national network. According to a report in The New York Times, many subscribers paid for ESPN through bundled subscriptions, but did not watch it. Of the 100 million households in the United States, just 1.36 million people viewed ESPN in prime time during the second quarter of 2013. ESPN and its majority parent, The Walt Disney Company, called bundling a great value and a force for program diversity, and argued that without bundling, ESPN's monthly fee would rise to $15. But fortunes subsequently changed for the network, which lost 10 million subscribers. The network went through two rounds of lay-offs, including some 50 broadcasters in April 2017. Analysts saw those moves as part of a shift in how ESPN distributes its programming, including the expected launch of a subscription streaming service: the functional equivalent of an a la carte channel.

Regional sports networks sold as part of bundled tiers were also a source of controversy. A notable example was Time Warner Cable's agreement to pay the Los Angeles Dodgers $8.35 billion over 25 years to exclusively carry the team's games on a jointly owned television outlet, SportsNet LA (since renamed Spectrum SportsNet LA), with the intent of reselling rights to other regional distributors. The largest satellite provider, DirecTV, offered to carry the channel on an la carte basis, arguing that SportsNet LA was most expensive of five regional sports networks and that a bundled offering would unfairly burden the company's subscribers. TWC responded that bundled sports channels were an industry standard, one that DirecTV itself adhered to in other markets. As of the end of the 2017 season, the dispute resulted in Dodgers game telecasts being unavailable to the majority of Southern California households for four consecutive seasons.

== Streaming services ==
While the discussion of "a la carte" services initially centered on cable and satellite services, the term has also been used in relation to cord cutting—the practice of using internet television services such as Amazon Video and Netflix as an alternative to traditional subscription television services. In this context, a la carte refers to a customer subscribing to individual services, as opposed to purchasing costlier bundles of service from a traditional television provider. To appeal to these customers and expand the availability of their content beyond "linear" television, broadcasters such as CBS, HBO, and Showtime have launched streaming services, including Paramount+ and HBO Max. These services feature their networks' respective content on-demand, and are purchased as a standalone service independent of television providers.

Amazon Video added its own a la carte "Channels" platform to its service in 2015, which allows users to subscribe to third-party content services delivered on top of the base Amazon Prime service; by 2018, it offered 140 different services, including CBS All Access, Showtime, and Starz.

Apple followed Amazon's lead when it made a March 2019 announcements of its Apple TV Channels service, which will allow users of Apple's free Apple TV app on numerous devices to bundle various video on demand subscription streaming service and access their content from one location.

Despite having used the term "A la carte" in promotion, Sling TV is not a true a la carte television service, as it is still distributed in bundles, customers cannot pick and choose individual channels to include in their service or swap them out for different ones individually, and some packages are only available on specific service tiers. The service cited the practice of mandatory bundling by broadcasters as an influence on this policy.

== See also ==
- Carriage dispute
- Family and Consumer Choice Act of 2007
