= Big TV =

Big TV may refer to:

- BTV (Indonesian TV channel), a subscription television station in Indonesia
- Reliance Digital TV, formerly Reliance Big TV, an Indian pay TV provider
- Big TV (album), an album by White Lies
- The former independent branding of WBGT-CD.
