= Audience Measurement and Analytics Ltd. (aMap) =

Indian TV audience measurement system

Audience Measurement & Analytics Limited (aMap) is an overnight TV audience measurement system that used to provide data on television in India such as demographics, ownership, and viewership. It also runs the AmapDigital, an overnight DTH (Direct-to-home) TV audience measurement panel. The data is now being provided by Broadcast Audience Research Council (BARC) India.

== Background ==
aMap began in 2004 on the basis of its research in India, which showed that a number of opinion leaders felt that the industry required an audience measurement system.

aMap collects viewership data using Telecontrol VIII data collection units sourced from Telecontrol AG, and wireless connections using GSM modems.

== Activities ==
aMap provides data on television ratings, gross rating points (GRP), reach, time spent, market share, target groups, connectivity of channels, content analysis and more.

aMap has an overnight panel encompassing 6,000 metered homes.

aMap delivers data overnight so that yesterday’s data can be accessed today by the subscribers. Over and above the usual demographics like SEC, age, gender and C&S availability, viewing data is also reported across durable ownership, vehicle ownership, type of TV, size of household, occupation and education of individuals, monthly household income, children at home, chief wage earner, type of dwelling and more.

== aMap's methodology ==
A team of Telecontrol experts, three professors at IIM Ahmedabad has developed mathematical and statistical modules that help aMap undertaking a data health check every day.

== aMap chosen as audience measurement currency by Eurodata TV worldwide ==
Eurodata TV Worldwide has released, ‘One Television Year in the World’ a handbook on TV audience measurement data across the world.

“Eurodata TV Worldwide” is the international data bank of TV programmes and audiences, which now covers over 2000 channels throughout 80 territories and provides daily program information including: content, production, international distribution and the audience levels for targeted programs, all data emanating directly from the authorized institute based in each country. For India the institute is aMap.

== Connectivity data ==
aMap is the only system in India that gathers and disseminates connectivity data on an overnight basis, for three times of the day. To aMap’s subscribers, data is provided on an overnight basis by market and by band. The bands in which data is disseminated are Prime band, Colour Band, S Band, Ultra High Frequency (UHF) and Hyper Band.

It gives the percentage of homes that receive a channel on a particular band.

== Audience Research Laboratory ==
aMap collaborated with Optimum Media Solutions (OMS)–a media agency and Mudra Institute of Communications Ahmedabad (MICA) to set up the “aMap OMS Audience Research laboratory” at the MICA campus. The laboratory was inaugurated in 2006. The lab is operated under the directions of its advisory council. It works with experts in social sciences, psychology, anthropology, advocacy and market research to explore audience research data.

== See also ==
- TAM Media Research
- Broadcast Audience Research Council (BARC) India
