= GSAT-8 =

Communications satellite

- GSAT-8
- Mission type: Communication
- Operator: INSAT
- COSPAR ID: 2011-022A
- SATCAT no.: 37605
- Mission duration: Planned: 12 years Elapsed: 15 years, 4 months, 6 days

Spacecraft properties
- Bus: I-3K
- Manufacturer: ISRO
- Launch mass: 3,093 kilograms (6,819 lb)
- Dry mass: 1,426 kilograms (3,144 lb)
- Power: 6,242 watts

Start of mission
- Launch date: 20 May 2011, 20:38 UTC
- Rocket: Ariane 5ECA VA202
- Launch site: Kourou ELA-3
- Contractor: Arianespace

Orbital parameters
- Reference system: Geocentric
- Regime: Geostationary
- Longitude: 55° East

Transponders
- Band: 24 Ku band and 2 in L1 & L5 bands (GAGAN)

GSAT-8 or INSAT-4G is communication satellite. It was constructed by the Indian Space Research Organisation, as part of INSAT system. GSAT-8 was launched on May 21, 2011, from Kourou, French Guiana. The rocket, an Ariane 5 was the carrier, marketed by the European Arianespace. First satellite to carry GAGAN payload followed up by GSAT-10 and in-orbit spare GSAT-15.

== Launch ==
Prior to launch, the spacecraft was transported from India to Cayenne – Rochambeau Airport in French Guiana by an Antonov An-124 cargo aircraft. The success of the launch is said to have made up for the previous loss of two satellites on the indigenous GSLV rocket. GSAT-8 was co-located with INSAT-3E at 55°E.
