= Shashi Sinha =

Indian executive

- Education: IIT Kanpur; IIM Bangalore
- Title: CEO of IPG India

Shashi Sinha is an Indian executive who is the current CEO of the Indian arm of advertising company IPG. He is heading all the three media agencies of IPG in India namely, Lodestar, Initiative and BPN.

== Early life and education ==
Shashi completed his bachelor's degree in engineering from IIT Kanpur and his master's degree in management from IIM Bangalore in 1981.

== Career ==
Shashi started his career with Parle as Product Manager.

In the early 1990s he set up Lodestar, India's first specialized media planning and buying outfit. He led the setting up of India's first media research and tools development cell at Lodestar.

He is also chairing the technical committee of the BARC.

== Awards and honours ==
He was featured in 2012 as the top 50 most powerful people in the city of Mumbai in a survey done by Daily News and Analysis newspaper. IAA India Chapter bestowed the prestigious 'Media Person of the Year' award on him in 2013. He was awarded the Distinguished Alumni Award by IIM Bangalore in 2012.
