= TAM Media Research =

TAM Media Research is a joint venture company between AC Nielsen and Kantar Media Research/IMRB. It is one of the two television Audience measurement analysis firms of India (the other being aMap). Besides measuring television viewership, TAM also monitors advertising expenditure through its division AdEx India. It exists in the PR Monitoring space through another division – Eikona PR Monitor.

The viewership cell runs what is one of the largest Peoplemeter TV Panels in the World with approximately 30,000 sample individuals representing all the Class-I towns (towns with population more than 100,000) polled every week for their Viewership habits. This division measures television Viewership of audiences for the 300-plus TV stations operating in India.

== Monopoly ==
The company had enjoyed a monopoly in the television ratings market in India till 2015.

== Monopoly Ends ==
Broadcast Audience Research Council (BARC India) was being propelled as an alternate TV viewership measurement system to the incumbent, TAM Media Research. TAM, a 50:50 joint venture between Nielsen and Kantar Media, was then responsible for the ratings that decide the fate of the `22,000 crore spending on TV advertising. It enjoyed a virtual monopoly, but its job left a lot to be desired.

BARC India was planned and executed as an alternative to TAM Media Research Pvt. Ltd. It was set up as per guidelines of the Ministry of Information & Broadcasting, Government of India.

It is mandated to design, commission, supervise, and own a television audience measurement system for India, and provides Indian broadcast sector with a real-time television rating points (TRP) measurement system.
