= CSpace =

Indian video-on Demands

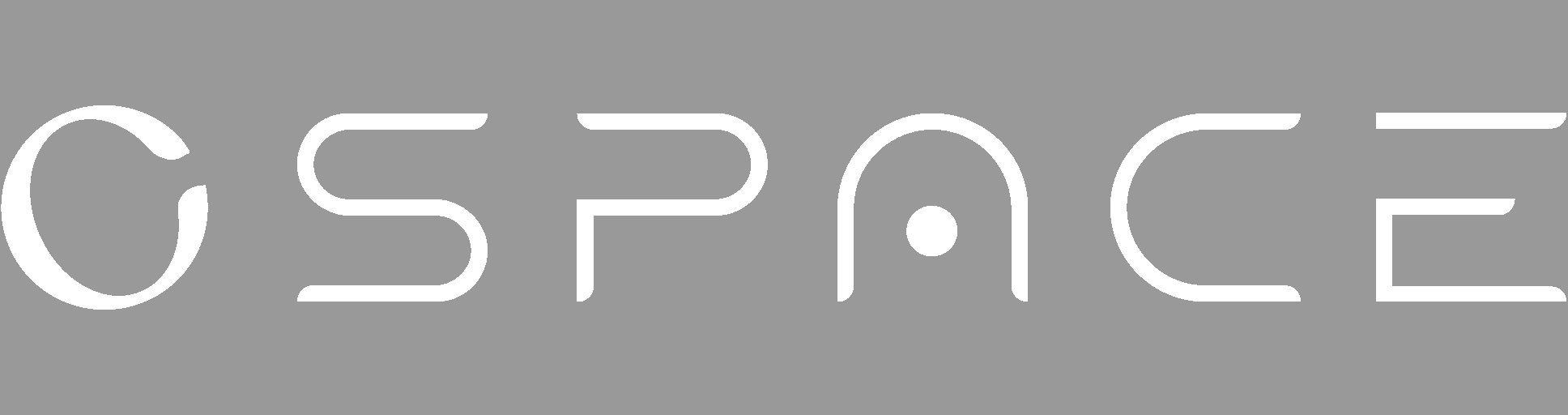
- Official logo of 'CSpace'
- Website type: OTT platform
- Country of origin: India
- Area served: India
- Owner: Government of Kerala
- Industry: Entertainment, mass media
- Website: www.cspace.tv
- Launched: March 6, 2024; 2 years ago
- Current status: Active

CSpace is an Indian over-the-top streaming platform launched by the Government of Kerala, marking the country's first government-owned digital streaming service. It is an on-demand video streaming platform providing entertainment exclusively in Malayalam language. The platform was officially inaugurated on March 6, 2024, by Kerala Chief Minister Pinarayi Vijayan.

== Development ==
CSpace was developed by the Kerala State Film Development Corporation (KSFDC) with the intent of supporting the regional entertainment industry. The platform provides a space for content such as independent films, documentaries, and short films, focusing on regional and Malayalam language productions. The project is part of the Kerala government's efforts to support the local film industry by offering an alternative distribution channel for content creators, especially those who may face challenges accessing commercial OTT platforms.

=== Pay-Per-View Model and Revenue Sharing ===
CSpace operates on a pay-per-view model, with users paying ₹75 to watch a film and a reduced fee for short films. The platform shares 50% of the revenue with content creators, while KSFDC covers half of the associated technical, rental, and maintenance costs.

== Content ==
CSpace consists of Malayalam films, documentaries, short films, and content from other regional languages. The platform is positioned as a digital venue for both established and lesser-known films, particularly those that may not receive wide distribution through traditional media or commercial OTT platforms.

== Challenges ==
Despite the launch, the platform has faced difficulties in building a substantial subscriber base in its first few months. The platform's visibility and reach have yet to meet expectations, and it has been noted that stronger marketing and content acquisition may be necessary to compete with established OTT platforms.
