= H.241 =

H.241 is a Recommendation from the ITU Telecommunication Standardization Sector (ITU-T) that defines extended video procedures and control signals for H.300-series terminals, including H.323 and H.320.

This Recommendation defines the use of advanced video codecs, including H.264:

- Command and Indication
- Capability exchange signaling
- Transport
  - requires support of single NAL unit mode (packetization mode 0) of RFC 6184
- Reduced-Complexity Decoding Operation (RCDO) for H.264 baseline profile bit streams
- Negotiation of video submodes
