= Digital television transition in India =

Transition to the digital-terrestrial television in India

Digital television transition in India began in 2010.

== History ==
=== Digital satellite and cable TV ===
The Television Networks (Regulation) Amendment Act, 2011 has made digital satellite and cable television transition mandatory in four phases. It was implemented after multiple extensions of analogue switch-off dates. The broadcasters, Multi System Operators (MSOs), and Local Cable Operators (LCOs) were ordered by the Ministry of Information and Broadcasting to end analogue transmission completely on 31 March 2017.

Phased implementation
Phase	Area	Regulatory direction for Analogue Switch-off	Actual Implementation Date
I	4 metros – Mumbai, Delhi, Kolkata, Chennai	30 June 2012	31 October 2012 (Delhi and Mumbai); 15 February 2013 (Kolkata); 17 August 2017 (Chennai)
II	38 cities with a population of more than 1 million	31 March 2013	1 January 2014
III	All other urban areas across India with a municipality	30 September 2014	31 January 2017
IV	Rest of India	31 December 2014	31 March 2017

=== Digital terrestrial TV ===
The Telecom Regulatory Authority of India had set the deadlines for the completion of the transition to digital-terrestrial TV Phase I (Metro cities) by 31 December 2019, Phase II (cities having a population of more than one million) by 31 December 2021, and Phase III (the rest of India) by 31 December 2023.

== See also ==
- Digital television transition
