= GSAT-15 =

Indian communication satellite

- Mission type: Communications
- Operator: ISRO
- COSPAR ID: 2015-065A
- SATCAT no.: 41028
- Website: GSAT-15
- Mission duration: Planned: 12 years Elapsed: 10 years, 6 months, 30 days

Spacecraft properties
- Bus: I-3K
- Manufacturer: ISRO Satellite Centre; Space Applications Centre
- Launch mass: 3,164 kg (6,975 lb)
- Dry mass: 1,440 kg (3,175 lb)
- Power: 6,200 watts

Start of mission
- Launch date: 10 November 2015, 21:34:07 UTC
- Rocket: Ariane 5 ECA, VA-227
- Launch site: Kourou ELA-3
- Contractor: Arianespace
- Entered service: 4 January 2016

Orbital parameters
- Reference system: Geocentric
- Regime: Geostationary
- Longitude: 93.5° E
- Perigee altitude: 35,774 km (22,229 mi)
- Apogee altitude: 35,799 km (22,244 mi)
- Inclination: 0.0728°
- Epoch: 11 June 2017, 00:27:58 UTC

Transponders
- Band: 24 × K_{u} band
- Bandwidth: 36 MHz

GSAT-15 is an Indian communication satellite similar to GSAT-10 to augment the capacity of transponders to provide more bandwidth for Direct-to-Home television and VSAT services. It was successfully launched on 10 November 2015 at 21:34:07 UTC aboard an Ariane 5 rocket, along with the ArabSat 6B satellite.

== Payload ==
The satellite carries 24 K_{u} band transponders and a GAGAN navigational payload operating in the L1 and L5 bands. Besides that it will also carry 2 K_{u} band beacons.

== Satellite ==
GSAT-15 has an estimated lifespan of 12 years. It will augment telecommunication, Direct-to-Home and radio navigation services.

== Cost ==
Cost of launch and insurance: about ₹860 Crore.

== See also ==
- Indian Regional Navigation Satellite System
- Global Navigation Satellite System
- Global Positioning System
