= GSAT-10 =

Indian communications satellite

- Mission type: Communication
- COSPAR ID: 2012-051B
- SATCAT no.: 38779
- Mission duration: Planned: 15 years Elapsed: 13 years, 11 months, 28 days

Spacecraft properties
- Bus: I-3K
- Manufacturer: ISRO Satellite Centre; Space Applications Centre
- Launch mass: 3,435 kilograms (7,573 lb)
- Dry mass: 1,498 kilograms (3,303 lb)

Start of mission
- Launch date: 29 September 2012
- Rocket: Ariane 5ECA
- Launch site: Guiana Space Centre ELA-3
- Contractor: Arianespace

Orbital parameters
- Reference system: Geocentric
- Regime: Geostationary

Transponders
- Band: 12 K_{u} band 12 C-band; 6 Lower Extended C-band; 2 L1 & L5 bands (GAGAN)
- Bandwidth: 36 megahertz

GSAT-10 is an Indian communication satellite which was launched by Ariane-5ECA carrier rocket in September 2012. It has 12 K_{u} band, 12 C-band and 6 lower extended C-band transponders, and included a navigation payload to augment GAGAN capacity. Following its launch and on-orbit testing, it was placed in Geosynchronous orbit at 83.0° East, from where it will provide communication services in India.

== Payload ==
- 12 high power K_{U}-band transponders employing 140 W TWTA. It is being used by Tata Sky
- 12 C-band Transponders employing 32 W TWTA.
- 6 extended C-band Transponders each having a bandwidth of 36 MHz employing 32 W TWTA.
- GAGAN navigation payload operating in L1 and L5 bands.

== Satellite ==
GSAT-10, with a design life of 15 years was operational by November 2012 and will augment telecommunication, Direct-To-Home and radio navigation services. At 3,400 kilograms (7,500 lb) at lift-off, at the time, it was the heaviest satellite built by the Bengaluru-headquartered Indian Space Research Organisation (ISRO). It was ISRO's 101st space mission. Arianespace's heavy lifting Ariane-5 ECA rocket launched the satellite about 30 minutes after the blast off from the European launch pad in South America at 2:48AM, prior to which it injected European co-passenger ASTRA 2F into orbit. GSAT-10 carries 30 transponders (12 K_{u} band, 12 C-band and six Extended C-band), which will provide vital augmentation to INSAT/GSAT transponder capacity. The GAGAN payload will provide improved accuracy of GPS signals (of better than seven metres) which will be used by Airports Authority of India for civil aviation requirements. This is the second satellite in INSAT/GSAT constellation with GAGAN payload after GSAT-8, which was launched in May 2011.

== Launch ==
GSAT-10 is the second satellite in INSAT/GSAT constellation with GAGAN payload after GSAT-8, launched in May 2011. The satellite was successfully launched on 29 September 2012 at 2:48 am (IST) on board Ariane-5 rocket from Europe's spaceport in French Guiana.

== Cost ==
The satellite and launch fee cost the agency ₹750 crores.

== See also ==
- Indian Regional Navigational Satellite System
- Global Navigation Satellite System
- GPS
- GSAT
