= MEASAT-3 =

Decommissioned Malaysian communications satellite

- Artist's impression of MEASAT-3 orbiting over Malaysia
- Operator: MEASAT
- COSPAR ID: 2006-056A
- SATCAT no.: 29648
- Mission duration: 15 years

Spacecraft properties
- Bus: BSS-601
- Manufacturer: Boeing
- Launch mass: 4,765 kilograms (10,505 lb)
- BOL mass: 3,220 kilograms (7,100 lb)

Start of mission
- Launch date: 11 December 2006, 23:28:43 UTC
- Rocket: Proton-M/Briz-M
- Launch site: Baikonur 200/39
- Contractor: International Launch Services

End of mission
- Disposal: Decommissioned
- Deactivated: September 9th 2021

Orbital parameters
- Reference system: Geocentric
- Regime: Geostationary
- Longitude: 91.5° east
- Perigee altitude: 35,787 kilometres (22,237 mi)
- Apogee altitude: 35,796 kilometres (22,243 mi)
- Inclination: 0.05 degrees
- Period: 23.93 hours
- Epoch: 28 October 2013, 21:08:19 UTC

Transponders
- Band: 24 C-band; 24 Ku-band

MEASAT-3 was a Malaysian communications satellite which was successfully launched on 11 December 2006 from the Baikonur Cosmodrome in Kazakhstan.

In March 2003, MEASAT Satellite Systems Sdn. Bhd. of Malaysia ordered a Boeing 601HP satellite, giving it the designation MEASAT-3 at that time. MEASAT-3 joined the existing Boeing-built MEASAT-1 and MEASAT-2 spacecraft in the Malaysia-East Asia Satellite (MEASAT) system.

International Launch Services (ILS) was contracted as the launch provider. Boeing was specified to also provide an upgrade to the MEASAT ground facilities in Malaysia, as well as training and launch support services.

MEASAT-3 was by International Launch Services using a Proton-M rocket with a Briz-M upper stage. The upper stage made five burns to place MEASAT-3 into a geostationary transfer orbit. After circularisation and testing, the satellite entered commercial service on January 25, 2007, in geostationary orbit at a longitude of 91.5 degrees East where it is co-located with MEASAT-1. The C band and K_{u} band now covers geographically remote areas such as Sabah, Sarawak, and North India and expands the MEASAT fleet's coverage to more than 100 countries embracing Australia, Middle East, Eastern Europe and Africa.

On 21 June 2021, an anomaly caused the satellite to drift out of its position, causing service disruptions for Astro customers throughout Malaysia. Although MEASAT is still commanding the satellite it is unable to stop MEASAT-3 from continuing to drift, now located at 84.69°E. Because of this, all transponders have been shut down and services migrated to other MEASAT and third party satellites.

Its replacement, the MEASAT-3d, is expected to be launched in 2022.

== Transponders ==
C BAND TRANSPONDERS
EIRP (dBW)	41 (Global beam), 45 (Asia beam)
G/T (dB/K)	+0.5 (Global beam), +2.8 (Asia beam)
TWTA power	65 Watts
Transponder bandwidth	24x36 MHz
Channel polarization	Linear
Frequency band	Uplink: 5,925-6,725 MHz; Downlink: 3,400-4,200 MHz

Ku BAND TRANSPONDERS
EIRP (dBW)	57 (Maximum)
G/T (dB/K)	+14 (Maximum)
TWTA power	120 Watts
Transponder bandwidth	24x36 MHz
Channel polarization	Linear
Frequency band	Uplink: 13.75-14.5 GHz; Downlink: 10.95-12.75 GHz
