= Broadcast Audience Research Council =

Indian audience measurement organisation

Broadcast Audience Research Council India
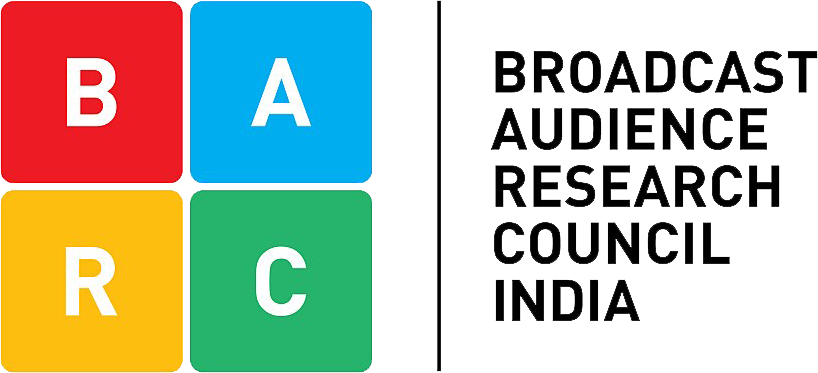
- Industry: Media
- Founded: 2010; 16 years ago
- Headquarters: Mumbai, Maharashtra, India
- Key people: Gaurav Banerjee (Chairman); Nakul Chopra (CEO)

The Broadcast Audience Research Council (BARC) India is a joint industry body founded by organisations that represent Indian broadcasters (IBDF), advertisers (ISA), and advertising and media agencies (AAAI). It is the world's largest television measurement science industry body.

It uses audio watermark technology to measure viewership of TV channels, and it also measures time-shifted viewing and simulcasts. The company was incorporated in 2010. It is based in Mumbai, India.

It analyses the viewership habits of over 210 million TV households (891 million TV viewers), which makes it the world's largest television audience measurement service. Its measurement system is based on a sample of 55,000+ "panel homes", which will increase to 65,000. It launched its TV viewership measurement service in April 2015 covering the landscape of Urban India. In October 2015, it started measuring all India TV homes (TV viewers in urban and rural India).

BARC India was planned and implemented as an alternative to TAM Media Research, the audience measurement system put in place by the information and insights firm Nielsen and Kantar Media, a WPP company. It was set up according to guidelines of the Indian Ministry of Information & Broadcasting.

Gaurav Banerjee was elected as the chairman in 2025. He took over from Shashi Sinha who served as the chairman prior to which Punit Goenka completed his tenure as chairman.

In August 2021, Nakul Chopra, the former chairman of the joint-industry body, returned as the CEO. He took over from Sunil Lulla who had joined the organisation in 2019 following the exit of the founding CEO Partho Dasgupta.

== About BARC India ==
BARC (Broadcast Audience Research Council) India is an industry body set up to design, commission, supervise and own an accurate, reliable and timely television audience measurement system for India. It currently measures TV Viewing habits of 210 million TV households in the country, using 55,000+ sample panel homes.This will go up to 65,000 over 3 years as mandated by the Ministry of Information & Broadcasting.

Guided by the recommendations of the TRAI (Telecom Regulatory Authority of India) and MIB notifications of January 2014, BARC India brings together the three key stakeholders in television audience measurement - broadcasters, advertisers, and advertising and media agencies, via their apex bodies.

Standardisation Certificates obtained by BARC India are CESP Certification which validates representativeness of BARC India's TV Measurement Panel and by ISI, Kolkata certifies the representativeness of BARC India's Panel Design & Household Selection.

== Genesis of BARC India ==
Nielsen (the owner of TAM Media along with Kantar Media) was sued by Indian TV channel NDTV for $810 million for fraud and $580 million for negligence in a New York court. NDTV's weighty lawsuit—194 pages; targeted at over 30 companies and individuals; and $1.4 billion in damages—against TAM and its investors accused them of deliberately publishing corrupt and tainted data, favoring rival channels in return for bribes. NDTV also alleged that Nielsen and Kantar were not funding TAM India adequately in order to increase its scale and invest in systems, security and quality procedures. A statement in the lawsuit read: "The primary remedy (of the corrupt activities) was to increase sample size from 8,000 boxes to 30,000 boxes, immediately stopping publication of data until the sample size was increased to appropriate levels."

The case was dismissed by the New York court on the issue of jurisdiction and asked NDTV to fight the legal battle in India.

NDTV subsequently unsubscribed from TAM's services only to subscribe again in May 2014 citing the lack of alternate sources for such data as the TAM provided and the arrival of BARC India as a new measuring standard in the industry.

== BARC Launch ==
After nearly two years of being in the making (2013-2015), BARC's new ratings system formally rolled out in April 2015. Since most broadcasters had decided not to continue their subscription to TAM India, the industry underwent a ratings darkness period since 1 April where the old TAM software had been given up, and the new BARC India ratings software was yet to be installed. The broadcasters had a feel of these ratings a couple of weeks before the official rollout when BARC India made a presentation to share household level data. While there were no major changes, channel ranking across genres, gaps between channels widened or narrowed.

The initial rollout of the new ratings included a sample size of 11,000 Bar-o-meters, and covered the towns and cities with a population of 1,00,000 or more. Although this was less than what BARC India had assured to launch with, by October 2015, the sample reporting was scaled up to 20,000 Bar-o-meters, covering all 153mn TV owning homes in India. The sample has been since scaled up to 30,000 homes. As of 1 July 2017, BARC India has stopped reporting of analogue TV homes, in line with Government of India's DAS-4 deadline.

At launch, the following changes were introduced:

- A deeper and broader consumer classification system called "new consumer classification system" (NCCS), replaced the existing socio-economic classification (SEC). While SEC was based on occupation of chief earner and education of chief earner, NCCS is based on education of chief earner and number of ‘consumer durables’ owned by the family which includes a list of 11 items ranging from ‘electricity connection’ and ‘agricultural land’ to cars and air conditioners
- The age groups as a reporting parameter will be different adapting to the NCCS. Under BARC India, data would be available for age parameters like – children & tweens (2–14 years), youth (15–21 years), young adults (22–30 years), adults (31–40 years), peak (41–50 years), mature (51–60 years), and seniors (61+ years). An addition in the reporting age group is 2–12 years and 13–21 years.
- The new ratings system under BARC also measured catch-up TV viewing along with linear viewer
- It made use of the channel watermarking technology that video content consumption on all platforms using an encoding process that involves inserting an inaudible audio watermark into the content at the broadcaster's end from where the signal will play out
- Since the people-meters under BARC, called BAR-o-meters, were manufactured domestically, the ratings measurement system would be able to scale up faster. These meters, were available at a lower cost than those imported from various countries globally.

== BARC India products ==
BIO News: It is a visualisation tool for News broadcasters that gives the performance of News channel, News Stories, News Anchors and Other Personalities at a click of a button.

BIO Advision: It is a visualisation tool for Advertisers and Media Agencies which helps brands understand their performance vis-à-vis other brands.

PreView: It is a service wherein BARC India subscribers can access the data of a specific event or show, three days after it is telecast. PreView data is also released through YUMI software, which is available on subscription.

TV + OOH: BARC India now measures and reports TV viewership that happens in social hot-spots like restaurants, pubs, and bars across 120+ Urban towns and cities.

Spot Trek: Provides reports on advertising monitored spots to the agency.

== BARC: TV audience measurement methodology ==
The entire BARC India process can be broadly bucketed as follows:

- Establishment Survey - A research study used to gather specific details of households and individuals to be used together with Census data in the preparation of universe estimates for TV audience characteristics – geographic, demographic, socio-economic status, etc. The Establishment Survey also serves as a randomly selected pool of TV owning households for use in the ongoing selection and recruitment of panel households.
- Panel Locations & Identification - Identification of a specific sample locations
- Panel Selection and Training- Selection, recruitment, meter installation & training of household members.
- Panel Management- Supervision of panel operations with strict adherence to established standards.
- Measurement and Viewing Data Capture- Watermarking and BAR-O-Meter Technology used to identify & capture TV viewing events.
- Processing, Audience Estimation and Reporting- Process of error checking, editing, validating, weighting, projecting to universe and delivering audience estimates to BARC India clients in a form suitable for reporting, analysis and commercial use.
- YUMI- BARC India's desktop software application is used to report and analyse audience data in the format required by individual customer segments.

== Broadcast India Survey ==
BARC India's Broadcast India Survey is an annual research study that gathers specific details of households and individuals to be used together with Census data in the preparation of universe estimates for TV audience characteristics – geographic, demographic, socio-economic status, etc. The Survey also serves as a randomly selected pool of TV owning households for use in the ongoing selection and recruitment of panel households.

Broadcast India 2016 Survey was released in February 2017. The findings of Broadcast India (BI) 2018 Survey was released in July 2018. The study is based on a sample size of 3 lakh homes in the country. As per the latest BI 2018 Survey, TV homes in the country have seen a 7.5% jump, outpacing the growth of homes in India which grew at 4.5%. India currently boasts of 298 million homes, of which 197 million have a TV set, having an opportunity of almost 100 million more TV homes in the country.

As per the New Universe Estimates 2020 released this year, TV Homes in India increased by 6.9% to 210 million from previous 197 million in 2018. TV viewing Individuals grew by 6.7%, effectively an increase of 56 million.

== TRP manipulation scam ==
The Telecom Regulatory Authority of India (TRAI) received complaints from the News Broadcasters Association against Republic TV alleging that it was violating TRAI's broadcast sector regulations with its unfair practices and sought an investigation into it.

According to the complaint, Republic Bharat had declared its genre as English news, but it was appearing in additional genres after registering itself in those genres. For example, in Delhi, the channel was appearing in both English and Hindi news category. Each "impression" that is reported in the TV viewership data, is an individual instance of viewing of the channel, even if it is a fleeting view. When a viewer cycled through the channels, Republic TV would appear twice, giving it double impressions as compared to other channels. Some cable network had set Republic TV as the default channel (i.e. landing channel) displayed whenever the TV was turned on, thereby increasing the impressions. These practices were seen as a deliberate attempt to illegally garner higher BARC India ratings and increase viewership.

The complainants, NBA also sought from BARC India that it withhold publishing viewership data for Republic until its unfair practices stopped. BARC India did not act on the request. Subsequently, multiple leading English-language news channels exited from the BARC India system. A news network also approached the Delhi high court against the unfair practices by Republic TV to inflate their ratings.
