= Airtel digital TV =

Indian satellite television provider

Airtel Digital TV
- Logo used since 2015
- Trade name: Airtel Digital TV
- Type: Subsidiary
- Industry: Satellite television
- Founded: 9 October 2008; 18 years ago as Channels; 6 November 2022; 4 years ago as under construction at Buildings in Bangalore; 22 May 2024; 2 years ago as built at Buildings in Bangalore
- Founder: Sunil Mittal
- Headquarters: Bharti Crescent, 1 Nelson Mandela Road, Vasant Kunj, Delhi, India
- Area served: India
- Key people: Sunil Mittal (chairman); Sunil Taldar (MD & CEO)
- Services: Satellite; Pay television; Pay-per-view; Streaming television
- Revenue: ▲₹3,100 crore (US$330 million) (FY22)
- Operating income: ▼₹2,100.6 crore (US$220 million) (FY22)
- Parent: Airtel Limited
- Website: www.airtel.in/dth/

Airtel Digital TV is an Indian direct-to home (DHT), subscription based satellite television provider. It is owned by Bharti Telemedia Limited, a subsidiary of Airtel India. It launched DTH satellite television service in India on 9 October 2008.

Airtel Digital TV is second largest DTH operator in India by subscriber base. As of 31 December 2022, it held a 26.35% share of the Indian DTH market.

== History ==
Bharti Telemedia Limited was incorporated on 30 November 2006 as a subsidiary of Bharti Airtel. The company announced plans to launch direct-to-home satellite television services across India on 7 August 2007. The service was launched on 9 October 2008 under the brand name Airtel Digital TV.

On 4 May 2011, Airtel digital TV announced the launch of its first high-definition digital video recorder (HD-DVR) priced at ₹3,990 (equivalent to ₹9,000 or US$96 in 2026) and ₹4,490 (equivalent to ₹10,000 or US$110 in 2026) for existing and new customers respectively. On 24 May 2011, Airtel announced that its HD and HD-DVR boxes were software-enabled to view standard-definition content up-scaled to 1080i HD. Airtel digital TV had a total subscriber base of 10.07 million as on 30 March 2015.

On 12 December 2017, Bharti Airtel announced that it would sell a 20% stake in Bharti Telemedia to American private equity firm Warburg Pincus for US$350 million. The sale received approval from the Ministry of Information and Broadcasting on 28 August 2018.

On 17 February 2021, Bharti Airtel announced that it would buy back the 20% stake in Bharti Telemedia that it had sold to Warburg Pincus at a cost of ₹3,126 crore (US$330 million). The transaction was completed on 22 March 2021.

On 6 November 2022, Buildings are under construction in Airtel Digital TV Tower has G + 50 floors in Whitefield at Yesthampur station at List of tallest buildings in Bengaluru.

On 22 May 2024, Buildings was built in Bangalore in Airtel Digital TV Bangalore was built in Bangalore. Launched only in Esperanza by UKn, Thubarahalli.

== Technical information ==
Airtel Digital TV's standard-definition broadcasts are in MPEG-4 with Interactive Service and 7-day Electronic Programmed Guide. A universal remote is included in the package that can, over IR frequencies, control both the TV and the DTH box. Airtel Digital TV HD provides channels of resolution 1080p pixel with a 16:9 aspect ratio. The set-top box is compatible with 7.1 Channel Dolby digital Plus surround sound and is the first HD set-top box in India to be compliant with the standard.

== Services ==
Airtel Digital TV provides Pay-per-view on connected boxes that includes a catalog of movies, TV series and other programmed across English and various Indian languages. It also offers interactive services such as iDarshan was discontinued on 1 March 2017, iKidsworld on 444/743, iMusicspace on 479/489/508/552 and games.
