= Independent TV (India) =

Indian satellite television provider

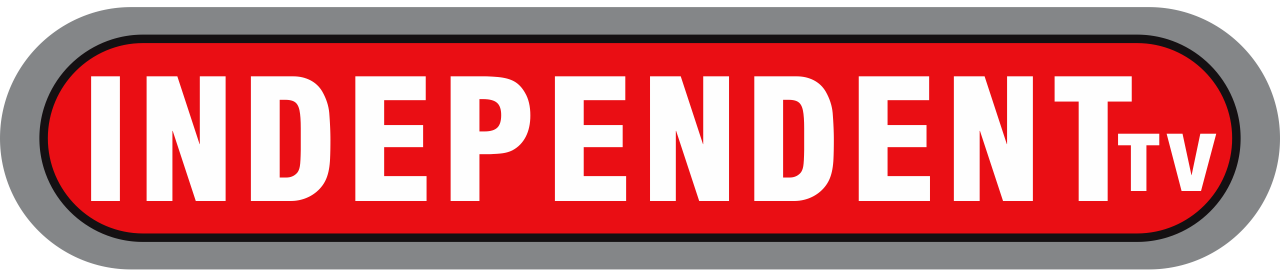
- Industry: Satellite television
- Founded: 19 August 2008; 17 years ago (as Reliance Digital TV)
- Founder: Anil Ambani
- Fate: Unable to pay operation cost to Antrix, services shutdown
- Headquarters: Block, 1st Floor, Dhirubhai Ambani Knowledge City, Navi Mumbai, Maharashtra, India
- Area served: India
- Key people: Vivek Singh (Director), Gurdeep Singh (Director), Rachakonda Venkata Ramana (Director), Vivek Prakash (Director)
- Services: Direct-broadcast satellite, pay television, pay-per-view
- Owner: Reliance Communications(2008–2018); Pantel Technologies & Veecon Media(2018–)
- Parent: Pantel Technologies & Veecon Media

Independent TV, formerly Reliance Big TV, was an Indian direct to home (DTH) television operator. It was a subsidiary of Reliance Communications till 2018 and later became part of Pantel Technologies & Veecon Media.Later the subscribes of this service were transferred to Tata Play formerly known as Tata Sky

== History ==
Independent TV originally launched as Reliance Big TV on 19 August 2008. The service acquired 1 million subscribers within 90 days of launch, due to limited competition from other operators in the market. The service was later renamed to Reliance Digital TV. The operator was acquired by Pantel Technologies & Veecon Media in January 2018.

In March 2018, the company launched a pre-booking DTH offer. The company took bookings and collected revenue from customers, but the service connections were not installed. After launching the DTH offer, the Pantel Technologies & Veecon Media group rebrand the company as Independent TV.

The company was unable to provide installation to their millions of customers and did not return their money collected before installation as per the prebooking offer, since their agreement with STAR India group had expired due to nonpayment. On 23 July 2018, Telecom Disputes Settlement and Appellate Tribunal (TDSAT) requested Star India and Independent TV to enter into a fresh agreement within 4 weeks.

The company's service was disrupted after further payments to the Antrix corporation were missed. Independent TV closed its services on 12 June 2019.

Independent TV Limited was a DTH Licensee of the Ministry of Information & Broadcasting (MIB), Govt of India. This license had then been renewed on 19 June 2019 for a further period of six (6) months and was valid till 31 December 2019. The satellite services of the DTH operator still remained temporarily suspended, but it still went ahead and launched a new go-to-market business drive named “ITV 2.0” for its channel partners, to resume its Business Operations, to make another attempt at consumer acquisition and service delivery

In January 2020, the TRAI's 'The Indian Telecom Services Performance Indicator Report July – September 2019', acknowledged that Independent TV had fully shut down operations taking the total count of Pay DTH operators in India to four.

== See also ==
- Direct-to-home television in India
