= Tata Play =

Indian satellite television service

- Logo used since 2022
- Formerly: Tata Sky (2006–2022)
- Type: Private
- Industry: Satellite television
- Founded: 8 August 2006; 20 years ago
- Area served: India
- Key people: Harit Nagpal (MD and CEO)
- Services: Satellite; Pay television; Pay-per-view; Streaming television
- Revenue: ▲₹5,741 crore (US$600 million) (2026)
- Net income: ▲₹79 crore (US$8.2 million) (2026)
- Number of employees: 24000 (2026)
- Parent: Tata Group (70%); Disney India (30%)
- Subsidiaries: Tata Play Fiber; Tata Play Binge
- Website: www.tataplay.com

Tata Play is an Indian subscription-based satellite television (DTH) service provider owned by Tata Group and Disney. Incorporated in 2005, it currently offers 690+ channels, 579+ SD channels, 110+ HD channels and 1 UHD channel, along with 50+ other value added services in Standard definition and High definition, free SD+1 and HD+1 services with some channels and many internet based channels. Tata Play is the largest DTH service provider in India. As of March 2023, according to TRAI Tata Play serves 21.3 million subscribers which is 32.65% of total DTH users in India.

Tata Play entered into an agreement with Vantiva to supply 4K set top boxes from early 2015. The company was formerly known as Tata Sky.

== History ==
Tata Sky logo used from 8 August 2006 to 19 July 2016

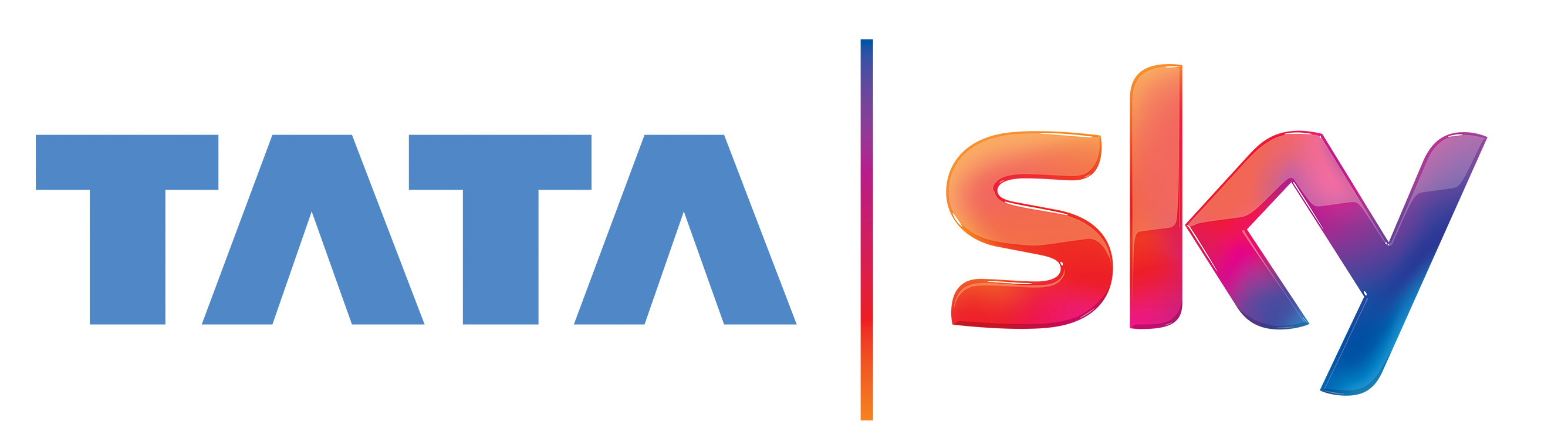
Tata Sky logo used from 19 July 2016 to 26 January 2022

Tata Sky was a joint venture between the Tata Group and News Corporation, which owned 80% and 20% stakes respectively until 2008, when Temasek Holdings picked up a 10% stake in Tata Play from the Tata Group. Tata Sky was incorporated in 2001, but launched services on 8 August 2006.

Tata Sky's holding company, 21st Century Fox, formerly owned an international group of DTH businesses that include Sky Italia in Italy and Sky UK in United Kingdom. The company uses the Sky brand under a licence from Sky Group.

Tata Sky partnered with Ericsson to launch the first Video on Demand (VOD) services in India in 2012.

On 9 January 2015, Tata Sky became the first Indian DTH operator to offer 4K set-top-boxes to its consumers.

On 20 March 2019, The Walt Disney Company completed acquisition of 21st Century Fox, making them their new 30% stakeholder, replacing 21st Century Fox.

On 26 January 2022, Tata Sky changed its name to Tata Play as the company decided to drop the 'Sky' brand name after 18 years.

On 4 September 2022, Tata Sons and the Walt Disney Company India finally agreed to launch an initial public offering (IPO) for the company after multiple failed attempts in 2013, 2016 and 2019. It has been reported that Disney may sell 10% of its current 30% share in order to abide by media cross-holding regulations, which limit broadcasters' equity in DTH companies to 20%. However, in December 2022, reports came of Disney completely exiting the company.

On 15 February 2024, it was reported that Disney was in talks with Reliance Industries to sell its 30% share in Tata Play.

In July 2024, Tata Play has expanded its global business reach by partnering with Akash Digital TV in Bangladesh.

== Satellites ==
Tata Play was the second operator to launch DTH or direct-to-home services in 2006. At that time, the company decided to use an ISRO satellite. In 2005, Tata Play signed a contract with ISRO for provision of satellite space on the INSAT-4A satellite. In 2007, one year after the launch of the DTH player, Tata Play asked for more space to increase the number of channels they telecast. The extra space was promised in 2009 on the GSAT-10 satellite, a then to be launched satellite inducted into the INSAT system. The GSAT-10 (CMS-01) was launched in September 2012, Tata Play has started utilising those transponders in March 2015. The mission of INSAT-4A was over on 21 October 2019. Tata Play is using ISRO's GSAT-30 satellite which is a replacement satellite of INSAT-4A.Tata Play recently leased entire capacity of ISRO's GSAT-24 satellite for additional bandwidth

== Tata Play Binge+ Set-Top Box ==
Tata Play Binge+ Set-Top Box, formerly known as the Tata Sky Binge+ Set-Top Box, was introduced by Tata Play in December 2019. The device offers an integrated environment experience, combining traditional satellite television channels with popular Over-the-Top (OTT) streaming services like Amazon Prime Video, Apple TV and Netflix. Operating on the Google Android TV platform, it provides access to a variety of apps and games. Additionally, the set-top box supports channels in 4K resolution, enhancing the visual experience for users.

== Awards and recognition ==
In March 2009, Tata Play became the first Indian DTH service provider to be awarded the ISO 27001: 2005 accreditation, the benchmark for information security. ISO 27001:2005 is an international standard that provides specifications and guidance for the establishment and proper maintenance of an Information Security Management System (ISMS).

== See also ==
- Direct-to-home television in India
