= Dish TV =

Indian direct broadcast satellite service provider pvt ltd

DishTV India
- Logo used since 2025
- Formerly: Siti Networks (1981-2003)
- Type: Public
- Traded as: BSE: 532839; NSE: DISHTV
- ISIN: INE836F01026
- Industry: Satellite television
- Founded: 2 October 2003; 23 years ago
- Headquarters: Sector 16A, Film City, Noida, Uttar Pradesh, India
- Area served: India
- Key people: Jawahar Goel (CMD); Anil Dua (CEO)
- Products: Satellite pay television, pay-per-view, streaming television
- Revenue: ▼₹3,569 crore (US$370 million) (2020)
- Operating income: ▼₹−1,222 crore (US$−130 million) (2020)
- Net income: ▼₹−1,654 crore (US$−170 million) (2020)
- Owner: Yes Bank (25.63%); Individual shareholders (24.42%); Deutsche Bank (6.16%); HDFC Bank (4.73%); Essel Group (4.04%); IndusInd Bank (3.78%); L&T Finance (1.95%); Aditya Birla Sun Life Asset Management (1.59%)
- Number of employees: 407 (2020)
- Subsidiaries: Zing Digital; d2h
- Website: www.dishtv.in

DishTV India Ltd. (stylised as dishtv) is an Indian subscription based satellite television provider based in Noida. DishTV was launched by the Zee Group on 2 October 2003. It ranked #437 and #5 on the list of media companies in Fortune India 500 roster of India's largest corporations in 2011. Dish TV was also voted India's most trusted DTH brand according to the Brand Trust Report 2014, a study conducted by Trust Research Advisory. On 22 March 2018, Dish TV completed a merger with Videocon d2h, creating the largest DTH provider in India at the time of merger.

== History ==
DishTV launched the first DTH service in India on 2 October 2003. The company decided not to compete against entrenched cable operators in metros and urban areas, and instead focused on providing services to rural areas and regions not serviced by cable television. Jawahar Goel, who led the launch, recalled 10 years later, "We hardly had four transponders and could offer only 48 channels, compared to analog cable that was giving 60 and was much cheaper. And, Star refused to give its channels. So, we decided to go slow and concentrate in cable-dry and cable-frustrated markets, rather than cable-rich markets and build the market step by step." Dish TV acquired 350,000 subscribers within 2 years of the launch.

Following bitter legal proceedings between Star and Zee, in 2007, the two companies called a truce and began offering their channels on each other's services. This decision and Dish TV's acquisition of more transponders enabled them to offer 150 channels on their service, more than any other DTH service in India at the time.

=== Merger with Videocon d2h ===
On 11 November 2016, the Board of Directors of Dish TV and Videocon d2h agreed to an all-stock merger of their DTH operations.

The merger was approved by the Competition Commission of India (CCI) on 10 May 2017, and by the National Company Law Tribunal on 27 July 2017. The merger faced uncertainty in January 2018, when Dish TV announced that it was re-evaluating the merger after some of the Videocon Group's lenders petitioned the National Company Law Tribunal to open insolvency proceedings against the company. In February 2018, Dish TV announced that it intended to go through with the merger.

As of 31 December 2017, d2h had a market share of 19% among the pay DTH operators.

The amalgamation was officially completed on 22 March 2018. The merger made the new combined entity the largest DTH provider in India with 17.7 million active subscribers. Dish TV and Videocon d2h reported separate revenue numbers in FY2017. The combined total revenue of the two firms was ₹8,077 crore (US$840 million). The company retained the name of DishTV India Limited after the merger.

=== Fall of promoters' shareholding ===
In May 2021, it was disclosed that promoters' shareholding in Dish TV has fallen to just 5.67%. It was also told that Yes Bank has become largest shareholder of the company.

== Subsidiary ==
Zing Digital is a subsidiary of Dish TV India launched in January 2015 to provide access to South India's regional channel. The service currently operates in Kerala, West Bengal and Odisha.

In 2025, Dish TV released VZY Smart TV lineup, the lineup includes options ranging from 32-inch TVs to 55-inch 4K UHD QLED TVs, all models run Google TV 5, based on Android 14.

== See also ==
- Direct-to-home television in India
- Fortune India 500
