= Sun Direct =

Indian satellite television provider

- Type: Private
- Industry: Satellite Television
- Founded: December 2007, 19 years ago
- Headquarters: 73, MRC Nagar Main Road, MRC Nagar, Chennai, India
- Area served: India
- Key people: Kalanithi Maran (Chairman)
- Products: Satellite television, pay television, pay-per-view
- Revenue: ▲₹1,845 crore (US$200 million) (FY 2021)
- Operating income: ▲₹738 crore (US$79 million) (FY 2021)
- Owners: Sun Group (80%); Astro Group (20%)
- Website: www.sundirect.in

Sun Direct is an Indian subscription based satellite television service provider, owned by Sun Group. It was launched in December 2007. It transmits digital satellite television and audio to households in India. Sun Direct uses MPEG-4 digital compression, transmitting HD Channels and SD Channels on MEASAT-3 at 91.5°E.

== History ==
Sun Direct is a joint venture between the Astro Group of Malaysia and the SUN Group of India. Sun Group entered into an MoU with the Astro group on 27 January 1997, when Aircel was not in existence. But, since the government of India did not allow the use of KU band transponders for DTH services, the project was put on hold, the firm said in a statement. After the DTH policy was announced by the government in December 2007, Astro picked up a 20% stake in Sun Direct TV. The stake was valued at approximately $115 million. Sun Direct TV was registered on 16 February 2005. However, the failed launch of Sun Direct INSAT 4C resulted in Sun Direct's lack of transponders, delaying the launch. The service was finally launched on 18 January 2008, after availability of transponders from Indian National Satellite System.

In 2009, Sun Direct was launched in Mumbai, the country's financial capital, and announced its pan- India launch. By 2009 Sun Direct became the leading DTH provider with 3 million subscribers.

=== INSAT-4B glitch and satellite change ===
On 7 July 2010, a power glitch in the Indian National Satellite System satellite turned down the DTH system partly and SUN Direct announced that the service would be free till all the services were restored. Partial service was restored on Indian National Satellite System Sun Direct with 193 channels. Meanwhile, SUN Direct is now transmitting 173 channels on MEASAT-3 for an uninterrupted transition of Sun Direct customers from the Indian National Satellite System at 93.5°E. to MEASAT-3 at 91.5°E.

As of 2017, Sun Direct uses eight transponders equally split between MEASAT-3 and GSAT-15, with three being added in that year itself. HD channels are being beamed from the four transponders on GSAT-15.

== Sun Direct GO ==
In 2023, Sun Direct launched Sun Direct GO, an over-the-top (OTT) streaming platform and video-on-demand service for mobile and smart devices."Sun Direct to Launch Sun Direct GO App". Journalism Guide. 19 June 2023.

The platform offers live television channels, movies, television series, catch-up content, and regional entertainment content in multiple Indian languages including Tamil, Telugu, Malayalam, Kannada, Hindi, English, Bengali, Marathi, and others.

Sun Direct GO was introduced as a companion digital service for Sun Direct DTH subscribers, enabling users to access live TV channels and on-demand content through smartphones, tablets, web platforms, and supported smart TV devices."Sun Direct GO – Google Play". Google Play.

The service also provides bundled access to partner OTT platforms and premium entertainment packages under selected subscription plans for both DTH subscribers and standalone users."Sun Direct GO". Sun Direct GO.

Sun Direct GO functions as an OTT aggregation platform by integrating multiple streaming services and live television channels through a single application interface. Sun Direct GO aims to become India’s one-stop gateway for Television Channels and OTT entertainment.
