= Asianet (TV channel) =

Indian Malayalam-language television channel

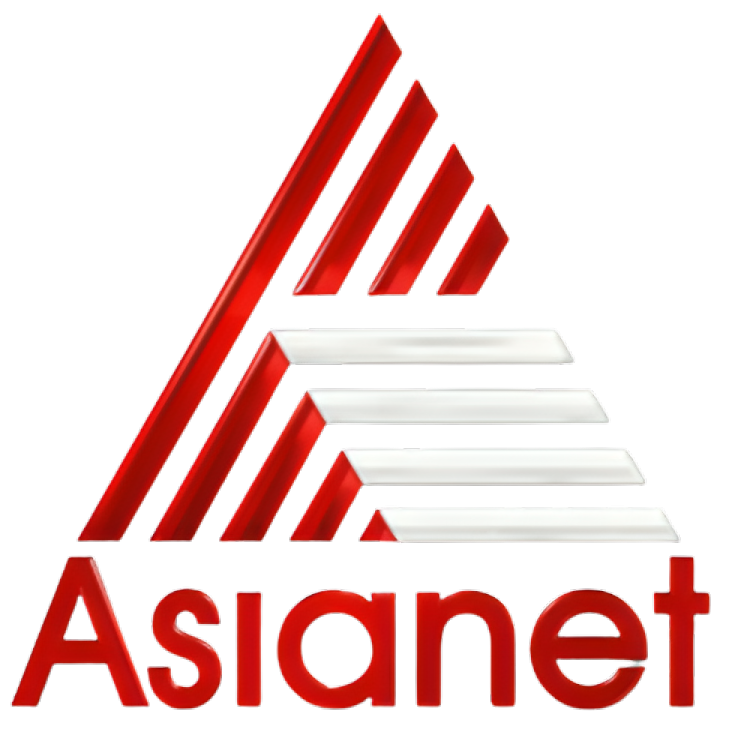
- Logo used since 2013
- Type: Television channel
- Country: India
- Broadcast area: Worldwide
- Network: JioStar
- Headquarters: Kochi, Kerala, India

Programming
- Language: Malayalam
- Picture format: 1080p HDTV

Ownership
- Owner: JioStar
- Key people: K. Madhavan; Krishnan Kutty
- Sister channels: Asianet Plus; Asianet Movies; JioStar channels

History
- Launched: 30 August 1993; 33 years ago
- Founder: Raji Menon

Links
- Website: Asianet on JioHotstar

Availability

Streaming media
- JioHotstar: Asianet

Asianet is an Indian Malayalam language general entertainment pay television channel owned by JioStar, a joint venture between Viacom18 and Disney India. It primarily telecasts programs such as serials, reality shows and Malayalam films. Asianet HD is the first High Definition channel in Malayalam and was the Star network's first HD channel in a language other than Hindi or English.

== History ==
=== Founding ===
The channel was founded by Raji Menon in 1993. In late 2006, Menon partially pulled out of Asianet Communications, turning over control to Rajeev Chandrasekhar (Jupiter Entertainment Ventures). Star India bought a 51% stake in Asianet Communications and formed a joint venture with JEV in November 2008. In 2014, Star India took full ownership of Asianet Communications.

=== Star India Acquisitions (2008–2014) ===
Asianet was restructured into four companies in June 2008 (general entertainment, news, radio, and media infrastructure). This move was to allow separate investments in each company. Star India started talks with the owners of the Asianet channels in August 2008.

Star India eventually bought a 51% stake in Asianet Communications and formed a joint venture with JEV in November 2008. The joint venture, called "Star Jupiter", comprised all general entertainment channels of Asianet 8 October 2013 Bombay 12 March Communications (Asianet, Asianet Plus, Asianet Movies, Asianet Suvarna and Asianet Sitara, a Telugu language channel) and Vijay TV. Star India had reportedly paid $235 million in cash for the 51% stake and assumed a net debt of approximately $20 million. It is not clear how much stake Raji Menon held in the new Star Jupiter venture. Before forming the JV, it was known that the founder (Raji Menon) had held about 26% stake. Star India increased its stake in Asianet Communications to 75% in July 2010 (for which Star India paid around $90 million in cash), and to 87%, by acquiring 12% stake for $160 million in June, 2013. The latter move was by acquiring a 19% equity stake in Vijay TV from Chandrasekhar and Asianet Communications MD Madhavan. Following the June 2013 investment, Asianet Communications was valued at $1.33 billion. Star India acquired a 100% stake in Asianet Communications (buying the remaining 13% stake) in March 2014.

The Walt Disney Company 21st Century Fox Acquisitions (2019–2022)

On 20 March 2019, following the acquisition of 21st Century Fox by The Walt Disney Company, its Indian subsidiary Star India, Star India-owned Asianet Communications and Star India's remaining subsidiaries became a subsidiary of Disney India.

=== Merger with Viacom18 (2023–present) ===
In July 2023, The Walt Disney Company began exploring strategic options, including a sale or formation of a joint venture, for their businesses in India. Between September and October 2023, the company held preliminary talks with Reliance Industries, billionaire Gautam Adani and Kalanithi Maran, owner of the Sun Group, for a potential sale of its streaming and linear television assets. In late October 2023, it was reported that Disney was nearing a cash and stock deal with Reliance Industries for the sale of its operations in India, including a controlling stake in Disney Star. The assets Reliance would acquire are reportedly valued at around $7–8 billion and a transaction was to be announced as early as November. Although Disney CEO Bob Iger refuted claims of a sale during a third-quarter earnings call, it was announced in December 2023 that Disney and Reliance had signed a non-binding term sheet for a merger. According to its terms, Reliance would hold 51% of the merged company in cash and stock, while Disney would own the remaining 49%. For purposes of the merger, a subsidiary of Viacom18 was created to absorb Disney Star through a stock swap, pending ratification and regulatory approval.

In February 2024, Disney and Reliance reached a deal to merge their streaming and television assets, with the joint venture valued at $8.5 billion including synergies. As part of the deal, Viacom18 would be merged into Disney Star with Disney holding a 36.84% stake in the combined entity, which would bring together assets such as linear television entertainment channels StarPlus, Colors TV and the Star Gold Network, sports channels Star Sports and Sports18 and the streaming services JioCinema and Disney+ Hotstar with Nita Ambani serving as the chairperson of the joint venture, with Uday Shankar serving as vice chairperson with the deal giving 16.34% to Reliance and 46.82% to Viacom18, with the deal being expected to close sometime in late 2024 or early 2025 pending regulatory approval.

In March 2024, it was reported that Paramount Global was looking to sell its 13.01% stake in Viacom18 to Reliance, which already owned a 73.91% share via TV18. Although Bloomberg News reported that the deal was unlikely to close, the deal was confirmed a week later for $517 million, its closure subject to regulatory approval and the completion of the joint venture between Viacom18 and Disney. Paramount would, however, continue to license its content to the company.

In August 2024, the National Company Law Tribunal approved a deal between Disney and Reliance Industries where JioCinema and Viacom18 would be merged into Digital18. In November 2024, Disney and Reliance Industries agreed to merge Star India and Viacom18. The deal was reported to be valued at $8.5 billion.

== Sister channels ==
=== Asianet Plus ===
Asianet Plus is an Indian Malayalam language pay television movie channel owned by JioStar, a Joint venture between Viacom18 and Disney India. Formerly it broadcast serials, re-broadcasts of Asianet's old serials, and various movies. Indian Super League (ISL) is being broadcasting on Asianet Plus from 2018 and Kerala Cricket League (KCL) from 2025. It was earlier known for its Dubbed Hindi Serials (eg:Mounam Sammadham) and Youth oriented programs. In 2026, it was converted to movie channel.

=== Asianet Movies ===
Asianet Movies is an Indian Malayalam language pay television movie channel that was launched on 15 July 2012. It Replaced Asianet Sitara, a Telugu General Entertainment channel. owned by JioStar a Joint venture between Viacom18 and Disney India. The channel usually broadcasts movies that were previously broadcast on Asianet and also some premieres. Its HD feed, Asianet Movies HD, launched on 15 March 2023. Asianet Movies HD was the first HD movie channel in Malayalam.

=== Asianet Middle East ===
Asianet Middle East is a Malayalam-language television channel primarily targets the Malayali diaspora residing in the Middle East. The channel broadcasts a variety of entertainment content including serials, movies, and cultural programs, with scheduling tailored to Gulf Standard Time.

== Awards ceremonies ==
- Asianet Film Awards is an award ceremony for films presented annually by Asianet. Asianet says that an awards ceremony has been instituted to honor both artistic and technical excellence in the Malayalam language film industry.
- Asianet Television Awards for television serials were started with this name, every year best serials were nominated and presented awards to them.
