= UTV Stars =

- Country: India
- Network: UTV
- Headquarters: Mumbai

Programming
- Language(s): Hindi
- Picture format: 576i (SD); 1080i (HD)

Ownership
- Owner: Disney India Media Networks
- Sister channels: Bindass; UTV Movies; UTV World Movies; UTV Action; Bloomberg UTV

History
- Launched: 19 August 2011; 13 years ago
- Closed: 1 October 2014; 10 years ago

Links
- Website: Official website name is now defunct.

UTV Stars was a Bollywood lifestyle and glamour-dedicated Indian television channel from UTV Group. It was available in high-definition and standard-definition across India and UAE. Broadly, the content of the channel focused on Bollywood news and music. The channel was primarily targeted at urban Indian youth.

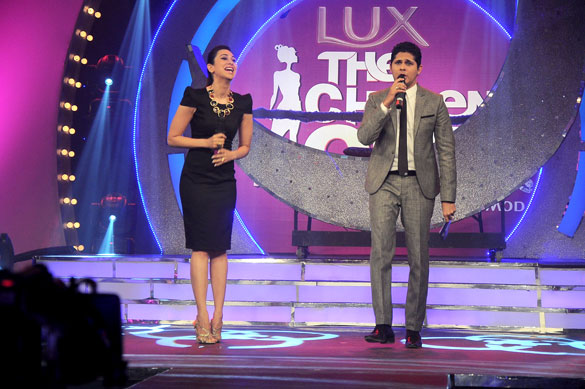
Karisma Kapoor and Vishal Malhotra on an episode of the UTV Stars' show Lux The Chosen One.

The channel launched on Sky in the UK and Ireland on 11 June 2012. In the region the channel was known as UMP Stars (UTV Motion Pictures Stars) due to legal issues over the UTV brand, which was already in use by the Northern Irish broadcaster UTV Media in Europe. However the channel struggled to attract viewers in the region and was shut down on 23 December 2012.

UTV Stars ceased its operations in May 2014. This channel was rebranded as Bindass Play, launched by The Walt Disney Company (India) on 1 October 2014.
