= UTV World Movies =

- UTV World Movies 2013 Logo
- Country: India
- Headquarters: Mumbai, Maharashtra

Programming
- Picture format: 4:3 (576i, SDTV)

Ownership
- Owner: UTV Software Communications
- Sister channels: Bindass; Bloomberg UTV; UTV Action; UTV Movies; UTV Stars

History
- Launched: 3 December 2007
- Closed: 5 October 2014

UTV World Movies was an Indian television channel dedicated to world cinema and was part of the UTV Software Communications network. It broadcast films of several languages along with English subtitles. UTV World Movies was launched on 22 February 2008 at the same time as UTV Movies which was dedicated to Bollywood films.
