= Disney Star =

Indian media conglomerate

JioStar India Private Limited
- Logo used since 2025
- Trade name: JioStar
- Formerly: Star India Private Limited (1990–2022); Disney Star (2022–2025)
- Type: Joint venture
- Industry: Media conglomerate
- Founded: 1 August 1990; 36 years ago as Star TV
- Founders: Hutchison Whampoa; Li Ka-shing
- Headquarters: Mumbai, Maharashtra, India
- Area served: Worldwide
- Key people: Nita Ambani (chair); Uday Shankar (vice-chair); Kevin Vaz (CEO – Entertainment); Kiran Mani (CEO – Digital); Sanjog Gupta (CEO – Sports)
- Services: Television broadcasting Films
- Revenue: ₹260 billion (US$2.7 billion) (FY 2024)
- Owners: Disney India (100%, 2019–2024; 36.84%, 2024–present); Viacom18 (46.82%); RIL (16.34%)
- Parent: Li Ka-shing (1990–1993); News Corporation (1993–2013); 21st Century Fox (2013–2019); The Walt Disney Company (2019–present); Reliance Industries (2024–present)
- Divisions: Star Studio18; Star Sports Network; JioHotstar; Owned TV Channels
- Website: jiostar.com

Disney Star, officially JioStar India Private Limited (and formerly Star India), is an Indian media conglomerate joint venture between Disney India, Reliance Industries and the latter's subsidiary Viacom18. On 14 November 2024, Viacom18 merged its assets with Disney India's subsidiary Disney Star to form JioStar. The deal, valued at $8.5 billion, involved the investment of ₹11,000 crore (US$1.1 billion) by Reliance Industries, which left Reliance Industries with a total stake of 63.16%, 16.34% directly and 46.82% through Viacom18, with Disney India controlling the remaining 36.84%. It is the largest television and entertainment network in India, operating more than 100 TV channels and a major streaming platform called JioHotstar.

== History ==
=== Founding and early years (1990–2000) ===
Star TV (Satellite Television Asian Region) was founded in 1990 as a joint venture between Hutchison Whampoa and Li Ka-shing. It launched Hollywood English-language entertainment channels for Asian audiences and in India as Star India. Its first five channels included Star Plus (then an English-language entertainment channel), Star Chinese Channel, Prime Sports, MTV Asia (now Channel V) and BBC World Service Television (now simply BBC News). Star TV had an investment subsidiary called Media Assets (formerly Mandarin-Media Assets) which was responsible for funding Thumbelina, A Troll in Central Park and The Pebble and the Penguin for Don Bluth Ireland Limited. In return, they would acquire the copyright for these feature films.

In 1992, Rupert Murdoch's News Corporation purchased 63.6% of Star India for $525 million, followed by the purchase of the remaining 36.4% on 1 January 1993. Star broadcasting operations were run from Rupert Murdoch's Fox Broadcasting premises. It later launched Star Movies, Channel V, and Star News with a limited Hindi offering, and then Star Plus for Indian viewers.

=== 2001–2017 ===
In 2001, Star India acquired South India based Vijay TV, renaming it Star Vijay. In 2003, Star India's Star News deal with NDTV ended. In the same year, the Indian government introduced a guideline limiting foreign equity in the national news business to 26%. At that time Star India was wholly owned by Hong Kong-based company Satellite Television Asia Region Ltd. As a result, Star India entered into a joint venture with the Anandabazar Patrika group (ABP) to form a new company, Media Content and Communications Services Pvt. Ltd. (MCCS), which took control of Star News' operations. ABP held a 74% majority stake, while Star India reduced its participation with the remaining 26% to comply with the regulations set for the uplinking of news and current affairs channels by the government of India. Star India, subsequently exited from this joint venture in 2012. After the split, the channel was renamed ABP News and operated by the Anandabazar Patrika Group.

In 2004, Star One was launched as a Hindi youth-oriented channel. In 2008, Star Jalsha and Star Pravah, Bengali and Marathi language general entertainment channels respectively, were launched.

In 2009, Star India acquired Kerala-based media conglomerate Asianet Communications, which served Malayalam language content. In August 2009, the Star Group restructured its Asian broadcast businesses into three units – Star India, Star China Media, and Fox International Channels Asia.

In the same year, Star Affiliate and CJ Group of South Korea launched CJ Alive (later known as Shop CJ), a 24-hour Indian television shopping channel that used Star Utsav for hosting the television marketing programs in six-hour slots in its initial stage of launch. Star Affiliate exited the joint venture in May 2014.

News Corporation launched a film production and distribution business in India through Fox Star Studios, an affiliate of Star India in the same year.

In April 2012, Star India won the rights to Board of Control for Cricket in India (BCCI) through 2018, replacing Nimbus Communications. Valued at ₹3,851 crore (equivalent to ₹79 billion or US$820 million in 2026), the agreement included rights to India national cricket team home matches on television and mobile streaming, as well as domestic tournaments such as the Ranji Trophy and Irani Cup.

On 6 November 2013, Star India rebranded its Star Sports channels, renaming the main Star Sports channel to Star Sports 1, Star Cricket to Hindi-language Star Sports 3, ESPN to Tamil-language Star Sports 4, and Star Cricket HD and ESPN HD to Star Sports HD1 and HD2.

In February 2015, Star India launched its streaming service, Hotstar, a mobile and online entertainment OTT platform that features content in 9 Indian languages and broadcasts sporting events. Star also acquired the broadcast businesses of Maa TV to boost its presence in Telugu-speaking markets, renaming it Star Maa.

In February 2017, Star India and global media conglomerate TED announced a new TV series, TED Talks India – Nayi Soch. The programme starred Bollywood actor Shah Rukh Khan and featured newer TED talks made in Hindi language. The programme followed the signature TED format of prominent speakers voicing their opinions in an 18-minute or less monologue in front of a live audience.

On 28 August 2017, Star India rebranded its Hindi entertainment channel Life OK to Star Bharat.

On 5 September 2017, Star India won the global media rights to broadcast the Indian Premier League (IPL) under a five-year deal beginning in the 2018 tournament, and valued at ₹163.475 billion (equivalent to ₹250 billion or US$2.6 billion in 2026). Beating previous rightsholder Sony, the contract included domestic rights for Star Sports, and digital rights for Hotstar.

On 14 December 2017, The Walt Disney Company announced their intent to acquire Star India's parent company 21st Century Fox for US$52.4 billion.

=== 2018–2022 ===
Disney Star Logo (2022–2025)

In 2018, Star India renewed its BCCI rights through March 2023, in a contract valued at ₹61,384.1 crore (equivalent to ₹900 billion or US$9.3 billion in 2026).

On 13 December 2018, Disney announced Uday Shankar who served as chairman of Star India would lead Disney's Asian operations and would become the new chairman of Disney India, which became a wholly owned subsidiary of the Walt Disney Company. On 27 August 2018, the channel Star Life was launched in Africa in English language offering the English dubbed Indian Hindi series from the Indian star channels.

On 4 January 2019, Star TV shut down its television operations in USA for the promotion of its digital counterpart, Hotstar.

On 20 March 2019, Star India became a subsidiary of Disney India after the US$71.3 billion deal in the acquisition of former parent company 21st Century Fox was closed. Disney India now owned television channels of both its extant subsidiary UTV Software Communications and Star India.

In April 2020, the Walt Disney Company merged Hotstar with Disney+ in India to form Disney+ Hotstar with Hotstar operating independently and coexisting with Disney+ in Canada and US, since it launched on 4 September 2017; the United Kingdom on 13 September 2018; and Singapore on 4 November 2020, prior to the launch of Disney+ in the country.

On 30 December 2020, Disney announced that the Star branding would be replaced with Utsav from 1 February in the Netherlands, with the Utsav Gold, Utsav Plus and Utsav Bharat branding launching in the UK on 22 January 2021. Star Vijay's international feed also changed a new logo based with Utsav Network in yellow colour and rebranded as Vijay TV around the world on that same day. Utsav Network separated into Star Gold, Plus and Bharat also launched in South Korea.

On 31 August 2021, Disney announced that it would phase out Hotstar in the US and move all content into Hulu and ESPN+. Initially, it was announced that the service would shut down in the US by late 2022, until it got moved to an earlier date on 30 November 2021.

On 18 October 2021, Disney and Star announced that they would exit from the English general entertainment industry and that they would close down Star World and Star World Premiere in India originally planned by 30 November 2021 (although the Star Movies channels, alongside Disney International HD would not be affected). The Bangla and Marathi feeds of Star Sports 1 also closed on the same day. Meanwhile, the Star Gold brand expanded with the launch of an HD simulcast of Star Gold 2 that replaced UTV HD, alongside the rebranding of UTV Movies and UTV Action as Star Gold Romance and Star Gold Thrills. Star Movies Select HD, Star Movies Hindi, and Star Movies Tamil were also to be launched as SD simulcasts of Star Movies, becoming the first niche premium English movie channel in India to do so. However, a delay in TRAI's new tariff order, followed by protests from digital cable operators and multi-system operators, caused the plans to be postponed until mid-March 2023.

On 14 April 2022, Disney India rebranded Star India to Disney Star. On 27 May 2022, Fox Star Studios was renamed just Star Studios, as part of the removal of the "Fox" name from the studios that had been acquired from 21st Century Fox by Disney.

=== Merger with Viacom18 (2023–2024) ===
In July 2023, The Walt Disney Company began exploring strategic options, including a sale or formation of a joint venture, for their businesses in India. Between September and October 2023, the company held preliminary talks with Reliance Industries, billionaire Gautam Adani and Kalanithi Maran, owner of the Sun Group, for a potential sale of its streaming and linear television assets. In late October 2023, it was reported that Disney was nearing a cash and stock deal with Reliance Industries for the sale of its operations in India, including a controlling stake in Disney Star. The assets Reliance would acquire are reportedly valued at around $7–8 billion and a transaction was to be announced as early as November. Although Disney CEO Bob Iger refuted claims of a sale during a third-quarter earnings call, it was announced in December 2023 that Disney and Reliance had signed a non-binding term sheet for a merger. According to its terms, Reliance would hold 51% of the merged company in cash and stock, while Disney would own the remaining 49%. For purposes of the merger, a subsidiary of Viacom18 (itself a subsidiary of Reliance) was created to absorb Disney Star through a stock swap, pending ratification and regulatory approval.

In February 2024, Disney and Reliance reached a deal to merge their streaming and television assets, with the joint venture valued at $8.5 billion including synergies. As part of the deal, Viacom18 would be merged into Disney Star with Disney holding a 36.84% stake in the combined entity, which would bring together assets such as linear television entertainment channels Star Plus, Colors TV and the Star Gold Network, sports channels Star Sports and Sports18 and the streaming services JioCinema and Disney+ Hotstar with Nita Ambani serving as the chairperson of the joint venture, with Uday Shankar serving as vice chairperson with the deal giving 16.34% to Reliance and 46.82% to Viacom18, with the deal being expected to close sometime in late 2024 or early 2025 pending regulatory approval.

In March 2024, it was reported that Paramount Global was looking to sell its remaining 13.01% stake in Viacom18 to Reliance, which already owned a 73.91% share via TV18. Although Bloomberg News reported that the deal was unlikely to close, the deal was confirmed a week later for $517 million, its closure subject to regulatory approval and the completion of the joint venture between Viacom18 and Disney. Paramount would, however, continue to license its content to the company.

In August 2024, the National Company Law Tribunal approved a deal between Disney and Reliance Industries where JioCinema and Viacom18 would be merged into Digital18. In November 2024, Disney and Reliance Industries agreed to merge Star India and Viacom18. The deal was reported to be valued at $8.5 billion. As a result, Disney Star rebranded as JioStar.

=== Post merger (2025–present) ===
On 14 February 2025 JioStar combined the streaming services JioCinema and Disney+ Hotstar to launch JioHotstar.

On 6 August 2025 it was reported that JioStar has acquired the exclusive broadcast and streaming rights for the US Open Tennis Championships for the next five years.

== Owned assets ==
=== On-air channels ===
==== India ====
| Channel | Launched | Language | Category | SD/HD | Notes |
|---|---|---|---|---|---|
| StarPlus | 1992 | Hindi | General Entertainment | SD+HD | |
| Colors TV | 2008 | Hindi | General Entertainment | SD+HD | |
| Star Bharat | 2017 | Hindi | General Entertainment | SD+HD | Formerly Star One and Life OK |
| Star Utsav | 2004 | Hindi | General Entertainment | SD | |
| Colors Rishtey | 2014 | Hindi | General Entertainment | SD | |
| Star Gold | 2000 | Hindi | Movies | SD+HD | |
| Colors Cineplex | 2016 | Hindi | Movies | SD+HD | |
| Star Gold 2 | 2020 | Hindi | Movies | SD+HD | Formerly Movies OK, UTV HD |
| Star Gold Select | 2017 | Hindi | Movies | SD+HD | |
| Star Utsav Movies | 2016 | Hindi | Movies | SD | |
| Colors Cineplex Bollywood | 2021 | Hindi | Movies | SD | |
| Colors Cineplex Superhits | 2022 | Hindi | Movies | SD | |
| Star Gold Romance | 2023 | Hindi | Movies | SD | Formerly UTV Movies |
| Star Gold Thrills | 2023 | Hindi | Movies | SD | Formerly UTV Action |
| MTV | 1996 | Hindi | Youth | SD+HD | |
| Star Sports 1 Hindi | 2017 | Hindi | Sports | SD+HD | Formerly Star Cricket |
| Star Sports 2 Hindi | 2025 | Hindi | Sports | SD+HD | Replaced Sports18 1 |
| Star Sports Khel | 2025 | Hindi | Sports | SD | Replaced Sports18 Khel |
| Colors Infinity | 2015 | English | General Entertainment | SD+HD | |
| Disney International HD | 2017 | English | General Entertainment | HD | Replaced Bindass Play |
| Star Movies | 1991 | English | Movies | SD+HD | |
| Star Movies Select | 2015 | English | Movies | SD+HD | |
| Star Sports 1 | 1996 | English | Sports | SD+HD | |
| Star Sports 2 | 2013 | English | Sports | SD+HD | |
| Star Sports 3 | 2018 | English | Sports | SD | Replaced Channel V |
| Star Sports Select 1 | 2016 | English | Sports | SD+HD | |
| Star Sports Select 2 | 2016 | English | Sports | SD+HD | |
| Star 4K | 2024 | English | Sports | 4K | |
| Hungama TV | 2004 | Hindi; Tamil; Telugu | Kids | SD | |
| Nickelodeon | 1999 | Hindi; Tamil; Telugu; Malayalam; Bengali; Marathi; Gujarati; Kannada | Kids | SD | |
| Sonic | 2011 | Hindi; Tamil; Telugu; Malayalam; Bengali; Marathi; Gujarati; Kannada | Kids | SD | |
| Nick Jr. | 2012 | Hindi; English | Kids | SD | |
| Nickelodeon HD+ | 2015 | Hindi; English | Kids | HD | |
| Disney Channel | 2004 | English; Hindi; Tamil; Telugu | Kids | SD+HD | |
| Disney Jr. | 2012 | English; Hindi; Tamil; Telugu | Kids | SD | |
| Super Hungama | 2022 | English; Hindi; Tamil; Telugu | Kids | SD | Formerly Toon Disney, Disney XD. and Marvel HQ |
| National Geographic | 1998 | English; Hindi; Tamil; Bengali | Infotainment | SD+HD | |
| National Geographic Wild | 2009 | English; Hindi; Tamil; Bengali | Infotainment | SD+HD | |
| Colors Bangla | 2000 | Bengali | General Entertainment | SD+HD | Formerly ETV Bangla |
| Star Jalsha | 2008 | Bengali | General Entertainment | SD+HD | |
| Star Jalsha Movies | 2012 | Bengali | Movies | SD+HD | |
| Colors Bangla Cinema | 2019 | Bengali | Movies | SD | |
| Colors Gujarati | 2002 | Gujarati | General Entertainment | SD | |
| Colors Gujarati Cinema | 2019 | Gujarati | Movies | SD | |
| Colors Marathi | 2000 | Marathi | General Entertainment | SD+HD | |
| Star Pravah | 2008 | Marathi | General Entertainment | SD+HD | |
| Star Pravah Picture | 2022 | Marathi | Movies | SD+HD | |
| Star Kiran | 2022 | Odia | General Entertainment | SD | |
| Star Vijay | 1994 | Tamil | General Entertainment | SD+HD | |
| Colors Tamil | 2018 | Tamil | General Entertainment | SD+HD | |
| Star Vijay Super | 2016 | Tamil | Movies | SD+HD | |
| Star Vijay Takkar | 2022 | Tamil | Movies | SD | Replaced Star Vijay Music |
| Star Sports 1 Tamil | 2017 | Tamil | Sports | SD+HD | |
| Star Sports 2 Tamil | 2025 | Tamil | Sports | SD+HD | Replaced Sports18 3 |
| Star Maa | 2002 | Telugu | General Entertainment | SD+HD | |
| Star Maa Movies | 2011 | Telugu | Movies | SD+HD | |
| Star Maa Gold | 2012 | Telugu | Movies | SD | |
| Star Maa Music | 2008 | Telugu | Music | SD | |
| Star Sports 1 Telugu | 2018 | Telugu | Sports | SD+HD | |
| Star Sports 2 Telugu | 2025 | Telugu | Sports | SD+HD | Replaced Sports18 2 |
| Colors Kannada | 2000 | Kannada | General Entertainment | SD+HD | |
| Star Suvarna | 2007 | Kannada | General Entertainment | SD+HD | |
| Colors Super | 2016 | Kannada | General Entertainment | SD | |
| Star Suvarna Plus | 2013 | Kannada | Movies | SD | |
| Colors Kannada Cinema | 2018 | Kannada | Movies | SD | |
| Star Sports 1 Kannada | 2018 | Kannada | Sports | SD | |
| Star Sports 2 Kannada | 2025 | Kannada | Sports | SD | Replaced Star Sports First |
| Asianet | 1993 | Malayalam | General Entertainment | SD+HD | |
| Asianet Plus | 2005 | Malayalam | Movies | SD | |
| Asianet Movies | 2012 | Malayalam | Movies | SD+HD | |

==== International ====
| Channel | Launched | Language | Category | SD/HD | Broadcast Region | Notes |
|---|---|---|---|---|---|---|
| Star Plus | 2021 | Hindi | General Entertainment | SD+HD | UK and EU | Formerly Utsav Plus |
| Star Bharat | 2021 | Hindi | General Entertainment | SD+HD | UK and EU | Formerly Utsav Bharat |
| Star Gold | 2021 | Hindi | Movies | SD+HD | UK and EU | Formerly Utsav Gold |
| Star Select | 2023 | Hindi | General Entertainment | HD | South Africa | |
| Star Khanya | 2025 | isiZulu | General Entertainment | HD | South Africa | |
| Star Life Africa | 2018 | English | General Entertainment | SD+HD | Africa | |
| Star Vijay | 2021 | Tamil | General Entertainment | SD | Middle East and South‐East Asia | Formerly Vijay TV |
| Asianet Middle East | 2010 | Malayalam | General Entertainment | SD | Middle East | |
| Asianet Cinema | 2025 | Malayalam | Movies | HD | Middle East and North Africa | Digital movies channel coexisting with Asianet Movies on starzplay |
| Colors ME | 2010 | Hindi | | SD+HD | Middle East and North Africa | |
| Star Plus USA | 2004 | Hindi | | SD+HD | United States | |

=== Defunct channel ===
| Channel | Launched | Defunct | Language | Category | SD/HD | Notes |
|---|---|---|---|---|---|---|
| Star One | 2004 | 2011 | Hindi | General Entertainment | SD+HD | Replaced by Life OK |
| Life OK | 2011 | 2017 | Hindi | General Entertainment | SD+HD | Replaced by Star Bharat |
| Movies OK | 2012 | 2020 | Hindi | Movies | SD | Replaced by Star Gold 2 |
| UTV Movies | 2008 | 2023 | Hindi | Movies | SD | Replaced by Star Gold Romance |
| UTV Action | 2010 | 2023 | Hindi | Movies | SD | Replaced by Star Gold Thrills |
| UTV HD | 2018 | 2023 | Hindi | Movies | HD | Rebranded as Star Gold 2 HD |
| Channel V | 1994 | 2018 | Hindi | Music | SD | Replaced by Star Sports 3 |
| Bindass | 2007 | 2025 | Hindi | Music | SD | |
| MTV Beats | 2016 | 2025 | Hindi | Music | SD+HD | Formerly MTV Indies |
| Sports18 Khel | 2022 | 2025 | Hindi | Sports | SD | Replaced by Star Sports Khel |
| Star News | 1998 | 2012 | Hindi | News | SD | Sold & rebranded as ABP News |
| Star World | 1991 | 2023 | English | General Entertainment | SD+HD | HD: discontinued SD: Replaced by Star Sports 1 Tamil HD |
| FX | 2010 | 2017 | English | General Entertainment | SD+HD | HD: Star Sports First; SD: Star Sports Select 2 SD |
| Comedy Central | 2012 | 2025 | English | General Entertainment | SD+HD | |
| Fox Crime | 2010 | 2015 | English | General Entertainment | SD | Replaced by Star Movies Select HD |
| Star World Premiere | 2011 | 2023 | English | General Entertainment | HD | Replaced by Star Movies Select SD |
| Star Movies Action | 2013 | 2017 | English | Movies | SD | Formerly Fox Action Movies replaced by Star Gold Select SD |
| VH1 | 2005 | 2025 | English | Music | SD+HD | |
| BabyTV | 2009 | 2023 | English | Kids | SD+HD | |
| Star Cricket | 2007 | 2013 | English | Sports | SD+HD | Replaced by Star Sports 3, Star Sports 1 Hindi |
| Sports18 1 | 2022 | 2025 | English | Sports | SD+HD | Replaced by Star Sports 2 Hindi |
| Sports18 2 | 2023 | 2025 | English | Sports | SD | Replaced by Star Sports 2 Telugu |
| Sports18 3 | 2023 | 2025 | English | Sports | SD | Replaced by Star Sports 2 Tamil |
| Nat Geo Music | 2007 | 2019 | Hindi; English | Music | SD+HD | Replaced by Nat Geo Telugu |
| FYI TV18 | 2016 | 2020 | Hindi; English | Lifestyle | SD+HD | |
| Star CJ Alive | 2009 | 2015 | Hindi; English | Shopping | SD | Replaced by Shop CJ |
| Star Life | 2024 | 2025 | English; Hindi | Lifestyle | SD+HD | Formerly Fox Life SD: Star Sports 2 Telugu HD; HD: Star Sports 2 Tamil HD |
| Fox Life | 2014 | 2024 | English; Hindi; Bengali; Tamil | Infotainment | SD+HD | Replaced by Star Life |
| Disney XD | 2009 | 2019 | English; Hindi; Tamil; Telugu | Kids | SD | Rebranded as Marvel HQ |
| Marvel HQ | 2019 | 2022 | English; Hindi; Tamil; Telugu | Kids | SD | Rebranded as Super Hungama |
| Star Sports 1 Bangla | 2019 | 2023 | Bengali | Sports | SD | Discontinued |
| Star Ananda | 2005 | 2012 | Bengali | News | SD | Sold & rebranded as ABP Ananda |
| Star Sports 1 Marathi | 2019 | 2023 | Marathi | Sports | SD | Discontinued |
| Star Majha | 2007 | 2012 | Marathi | News | SD | Sold & rebranded as ABP Majha |
| Colors Odia | 2002 | 2025 | Odia | General Entertainment | SD | Previously known as ETV Odia |
| Star Vijay Music | 2020 | 2022 | Tamil | Music | SD | Replaced by Star Vijay Takkar |
| Nat Geo Tamil | 2019 | 2020 | Tamil | Infotainment | SD | Discontinued |
| Nat Geo Telugu | 2019 | 2020 | Telugu | Infotainment | SD | Discontinued |

== See also ==
- Paramount International Networks
- Paramount Networks EMEAA
- Viacom18
- Network18 Group
- Reliance Industries
