= Star Sports (India) =

Indian television sports channel

Star Sports Network
- Logo used since 2017
- Type: Sports
- Country: India
- Broadcast area: Indian subcontinent

Programming
- Languages: English; Hindi; Tamil; Telugu; Kannada; Malayalam
- Picture format: 1080p HDTV (downscaled to letterboxed 576p for the SDTV feed)

Ownership
- Owner: JioStar
- Key people: Nita Ambani; Uday Shankar
- Sister channels: JioStar Channels

History
- Launched: 28 October 1996; 30 years ago

Links
- Website: hotstar.com

Availability

Streaming media
- JioHotstar: India, United Kingdom, Canada and Singapore

The Star Sports Network is a group of Indian pay television sports channels owned by JioStar, a joint venture between Viacom18 and Disney India, The network currently holds rights of flagship tournaments like International Cricket Council events, Indian Premier League, Premier League, ONE Championship, Wimbledon, FIH events etc.

The networks were initially formed in 1991 as a joint venture between Star TV and Tele-Communications Inc. (TCI) known as Prime Sports, taking their name from TCI's U.S. regional sports networks of the same name. In 1996, Star agreed to merge its sports networks in Asia with those of its rival ESPN, forming ESPN Star Sports. In June 2012, News Corporation acquired ESPN's stake in the joint venture; its corporate successor 21st Century Fox was, in turn, acquired by ESPN's majority-owner the Walt Disney Company in 2019.

Star Sports is a major broadcaster of cricket in India, holding the pay television rights to domestic national team matches, the Indian Premier League, and International Cricket Council tournaments. Streaming rights to many Star Sports properties are held in India by sister streaming service JioHotstar.

== History ==
Hong Kong-based Star TV launched Prime Sports (later renamed Star Sports) in partnership with American company TCI, which owned Prime-branded regional sports channels. The channel was broadcast across Asia, including India, as with the footprint of AsiaSat 7. Star TV has since regionalized the channel with several versions. Later, ESPN joined the region as a competitor to Star Sports.

In October 1996, Star Sports announced an agreement to merge its operations with those of ESPN International in the region, forming a Singapore-based joint venture known as ESPN Star Sports.

In June 2012, it was announced that Star TV, by then owned by News Corporation, would acquire ESPN's share in ESPN Star Sports. The sale was completed in January 2013. On 11 March 2013, Star Sports 2, a Hindi-language sports channel, was launched as a sister channel to Star Sports, Star Cricket and ESPN.

On 6 November 2013, Star Sports introduced a new brand identity and re-aligned its channels in India; Star Sports became Star Sports 1; Star Cricket became Star Sports 3, a Hindi language channel; ESPN became Star Sports 4 and on 28 May 2017 Star Sports 4 became Star Sports 1 Tamil a Tamil language Sports channel, and Star Cricket HD and ESPN HD became Star Sports HD1 and HD2 respectively. In Hong Kong, Taiwan and Southeast Asia, the ESPN Star Sports channels were relaunched by Fox International Channels Asia Pacific as Fox Sports. ESPN International later established a partnership with Multi-Screen Media in October 2015, which rebranded Sony Kix as Sony ESPN in January 2016.

Star India planned to replace the troubled Channel V with Star Sports 1 Kannada on 16 November 2017, but the delay in regulatory approval meant the plan was postponed. Later, Star India replaced Channel V into the current iteration of Star Sports 3 on 15 September 2018, and launched Star Sports 1 Telugu and Star Sports 1 Kannada as new channels on 7 and 29 December 2018, respectively. In the meantime, Kannada commentary of Star Sports' coverage of the Indian Premier League was broadcast on Star Suvarna.

21st Century Fox was acquired by Disney on 19 March 2019, giving it ownership of Star Sports.

Ahead of the 2023 Indian Premier League—whose streaming rights would now be owned by JioCinema—Star Sports announced that it would launch feeds of Star Sports 1 Tamil and Telugu in HD on 15 March 2023. Concurrently, the Bangla and Marathi feeds were discontinued. In June 2023, in response to JioCinema's decision to stream every IPL 2023 match for free, Star Sports and Disney+ Hotstar announced that the 2023 Asia Cup and 2023 Men's Cricket World Cup would stream for free on mobile devices.

Star Sports also holds the rights to broadcast Premier League matches on its channels. Star Sports Select 1, Star Sports Select 1 HD, Star Sports Select 2, and Star Sports Select 2 HD are the primary channels, while selected matches may also be broadcast on Star Sports 4K and Star Sports 3.

== Operating channels ==
=== On-air channels ===
Channel	Launched	Language	Category	SD/HD	Notes
Star Sports 1	1996	English	National	SD+HD	
Star Sports 2	2013	English	National	SD+HD	
Star Sports 3	2018	English	National	SD	Replaced Channel V
Star Sports Select 1	2016	English	National	SD+HD	
Star Sports Select 2	2016	English	National	SD+HD	
Star Sports 1 Hindi	2017	Hindi	National	SD+HD	Formerly Star Cricket
Star Sports 2 Hindi	2025	Hindi	National	SD+HD	Replaced Sports18 1
Star Sports Khel	2025	Hindi	National	SD	Replaced Sports18 Khel
Star Sports 1 Tamil	2017	Tamil	Regional	SD+HD	
Star Sports 2 Tamil	2025	Tamil	Regional	SD+HD	Replaced Sports18 3
Star Sports 1 Telugu	2018	Telugu	Regional	SD+HD	
Star Sports 2 Telugu	2025	Telugu	Regional	SD+HD	Replaced Sports18 2
Star Sports 1 Kannada	2018	Kannada	Regional	SD	
Star Sports 2 Kannada	2025	Kannada	Regional	SD	Replaced Star Sports First

=== Off-air channels ===
- Star Sports 4
- Star Sports 4 HD
- ESPN
- ESPN HD
- Star Cricket
- Star Cricket HD
- Star Sports 1 Bangla
- Star Sports 1 Marathi
- Star Sports First

== See also ==
- Fox Sports (Asian TV network)
- Star Sports (East Asian TV channel)
