= Ultimate Sports Quiz =

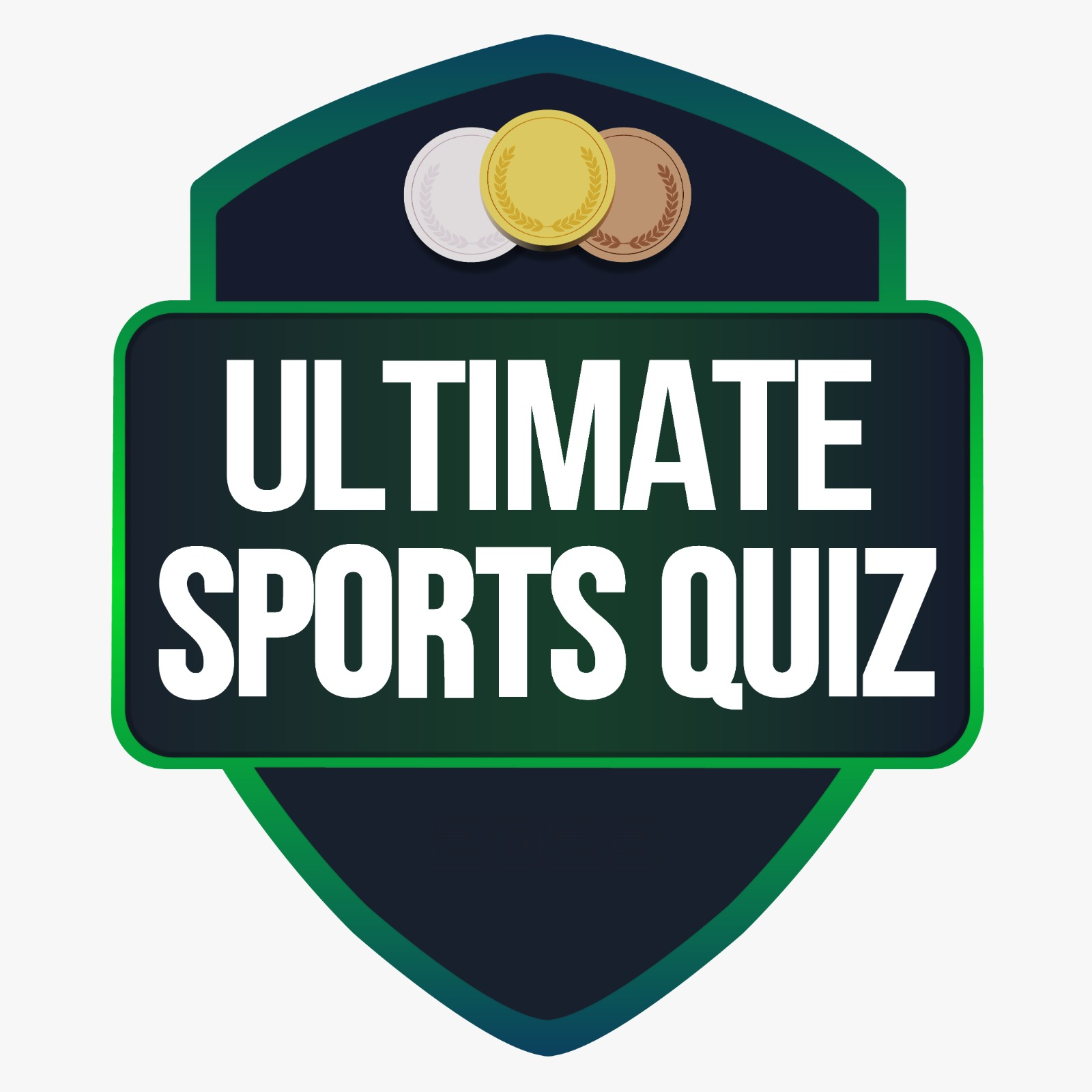
- Presented by: Harsha Bhogle
- Country of origin: India
- No. of seasons: 2
- No. of episodes: 32

Production
- Producer: VUSport

Original release
- Network: Sony Ten; MX Player
- Release: 5 June – 17 June 2022
- Network: JioCinema; Sports18
- Release: 29 November – 17 December 2023

The Ultimate Sports Quiz (USQ) is a National level inter-school sports quiz competition that is broadcast on JioCinema and Sports18 in India.

== Background ==
Super Six Sports Gaming Private Limited (SSSG) is a sports tech start-up launched in the second half of 2019. The Ultimate Sports Quiz 2023 is presented by Harsha Bhogle.

The 2nd season is a 19-episode televised series.

== Concept ==
Traditionally, sports quizzing in India generates a lot of interest among student community as they follow sports from around the world. A sports quiz aired on India’s leading sports broadcaster back in the 2000s has a cult following even today. Encouraged by its impact and success, a national level sports quiz called the Ultimate Sports Quiz was conceptualized with the intent of bringing back the romance and nostalgia of the once popular cult quiz show.

== Quiz details ==
The 2023 season of the Ultimate Sports Quiz featured the top 36 teams shortlisted through a selection test from across 4000 teams and 350 cities across the county. This competition is also an endeavor to support grass root level sports development as the top three teams that reach the national finals will be awarded a total prize pool of INR 1 Crore approx.; part of which will be a cash prize for developing sports infrastructure in their respective schools. The Winners will get a once-in-a-lifetime opportunity to watch a Live sporting event of their choice anywhere in the world.

Each school team is composed of two students representing the school in the competition. Students from class 6 to 10 are eligible to take part in the quiz.

== Ultimate Sports Quiz content and format ==
USQ features questions on popular sports around the world. It also has a fair amount of questions on Indian sports and sportsperson as well. The format of the quiz is modelled on the Olympic motto of – Citius, Altius, Fortius. The three rounds are designed to test speed and accuracy, depth of knowledge and ability to perform under pressure. The quiz encourages participation, sportsman spirit and is conducted in a fun environment.

== USQ 2023 Quiz structure ==
Each quiz features three teams of two members each. The Top 9 teams from each of the 4 Zones - North, East, West and South make up a total of 36 teams that will be part of the televised episodes. The 2023 edition of USQ has 3 Zonal preliminary rounds followed by the Zonal Finals. At the end of all 4 Zonal competitions, we would have 4 Zonal Champions from all the Zones. These 4 teams would then compete along with the 2 best losing teams in the National Semifinals. The National Finals will feature the winners of the 2 Semifinals and the best losing team from the Semifinals competing for the title of National Champions 2023.

== USQ 2023 Quiz Results ==
Episode number	Date	Episode Description	Team 1	Team 2	Team 3	Winner
1	29 Nov, 2023	Preliminary Round 1 North Zone	Aditya & Aryan Sunbeam Lahartara Varanasi	Cyril & Falit St. Columba's Delhi	Paarth & Rudransh St. Francis' (H) Lucknow	Paarth & Rudransh St. Francis' (H) Lucknow
2	30 Nov, 2023	Preliminary Round 1 East Zone	Srinjoy & Swastik RKM Vidyalaya Narendrapur	Sharique & Tathagata DPS Kalinga Cuttack	Sumit & Abhirukh Parambhika Patna	Sharique & Tathagata DPS Kalinga Cuttack
3	01 Dec, 2023	Preliminary Round 1 West Zone	Ameya & Manan KPS (Kamal Vihar) Raipur	Rohit & Kishlay Kendriya Vidyalaya (B) Mumbai	Arpit & Vedant Bhatikar Model Goa	Ameya & Manan KPS (Kamal Vihar) Raipur
4	02 Dec, 2023	Preliminary Round 1 South Zone	Naveena Priyan & Poovaraghavan Amalorpavam Puducherry	Kritin & Arnav Timpany School Vizag	Karthik & Aromal Carmel CMI Shoranur	Naveena Priyan & Poovaraghavan Amalorpavam Puducherry
5	03 Dec, 2023	Preliminary Round 2 North Zone	Ayush & Aaditya St. George's Mussoorie	Manthan & Rohit Cambridge Court Jaipur	Snehit & Vivek Sunbeam Bhagwanpur Varanasi	Manthan & Rohit Cambridge Court Jaipur
6	04 Dec, 2023	Preliminary Round 2 East Zone	Prantika & Gitesh BSF School Kadamtala	Atharva & Shabd DPS Ranchi	Aarav & Debarshi BHS Kolkata	Aarav & Debarshi BHS Kolkata
7	05 Dec, 2023	Preliminary Round 2 West Zone	Adheesh & Samarth Sharada Mandir Panaji	Rudraksha & Ameya DPS Kolar Bhopal	Nirja & Unnati Anant School Ahmedabad	Rudraksha & Ameya DPS Kolar Bhopal
8	06 Dec, 2023	Preliminary Round 2 South Zone	Samanway & Thapan Vedavyasa Vidyalam Kozhikode	Antonita & Arjun PSBB KK Nagar Chennai	Tarun & Kiran Bhavan's Vidya Mandir (G) Kochi	Tarun & Kiran Bhavan's Vidya Mandir (G) Kochi
9	07 Dec, 2023	Preliminary Round 3 North Zone	Shivraj & Anmol Neeja Modi Jaipur	Malhar & Nidhir Tagore International (VV) Delhi	Sarthak & Tejas Aryan International Varanasi	Malhar & Nidhir Tagore International (VV) Delhi
10	08 Dec, 2023	Preliminary Round 3 East Zone	Swayansu & Tanmay Kendriya Vidyalaya Puri	Mahin & Sourarup TTV Hooghly	Vinayak & Samrit South Point Guwahati	Vinayak & Samrit South Point Guwahati
11	09 Dec, 2023	Preliminary Round 3 West Zone	Tanay & Ishaan Garodia International Mumbai	Param & Shrihan Mount Litera Surat	Daksh & Aryavrat St. Anthony's Udaipur	Daksh & Aryavrat St. Anthony's Udaipur
12	10 Dec, 2023	Preliminary Round 3 South Zone	Aman & Harith Bhavan's Vidya Mandir (E) Kochi	Madhav & Kian TISB Bengaluru	Hruthik & Venkatesh Teja Vidyalaya Kodad	Aman & Harith Bhavan's Vidya Mandir (E) Kochi
13	11 Dec, 2023	Final South Zone	Naveena Priyan & Poovaraghavan Amalorpavam Puducherry	Tarun & Kiran Bhavan's Vidya Mandir (G) Kochi	Aman & Harith Bhavan's Vidya Mandir (E) Kochi	Naveena Priyan & Poovaraghavan Amalorpavam Puducherry
14	12 Dec, 2023	Final East Zone	Sharique & Tathagata DPS Kalinga Cuttack	Aarav & Debarshi BHS Kolkata	Vinayak & Samrit South Point Guwahati	Aarav & Debarshi BHS Kolkata
15	13 Dec, 2023	Final West Zone	Ameya & Manan KPS (Kamal Vihar) Raipur	Rudraksha & Ameya DPS Kolar Bhopal	Daksh & Aryavrat St. Anthony's Udaipur	Rudraksha & Ameya DPS Kolar Bhopal
16	14 Dec, 2023	Final North Zone	Paarth & Rudransh St. Francis' (H) Lucknow	Manthan & Rohit Cambridge Court Jaipur	Malhar & Nidhir Tagore International (VV) Delhi	Paarth & Rudransh St. Francis' (H) Lucknow
17	15 Dec, 2023	Semi-Final 1	Ameya & Manan* KPS (Kamal Vihar) Raipur	Paarth & Rudransh St. Francis' (H) Lucknow	Aarav & Debarshi BHS Kolkata	Ameya & Manan KPS (Kamal Vihar) Raipur
18	16 Dec, 2023	Semi-Final 2	Rudraksha & Ameya DPS Kolar Bhopal	Naveena Priyan & Poovaraghavan Amalorpavam Puducherry	Malhar & Nidhir* Tagore International (VV) Delhi	Malhar & Nidhir Tagore International (VV) Delhi
19	17 Dec, 2023	Grand Finale	Ameya & Manan KPS (Kamal Vihar) Raipur	Malhar & Nidhir Tagore International (VV) Delhi	Aarav & Debarshi* BHS Kolkata	Aarav & Debarshi BHS Kolkata

*Lucky Losers
