= USQ (disambiguation) =

USQ often stands for the University of Southern Queensland, a university located in Toowoomba, Queensland, Australia.

USQ could also refer to:

- US Quadball, which governs quadball (formerly known as "quidditch") in the U.S.
- Uşak Airport, an airport in Uşak, Turkey, by IATA code
- Ultimate Sports Quiz, an Indian sports quiz show
- Unseptquadium, an unsynthesized element with symbol Usq
