= National Geographic India =

Indian television channel

- Logo used since 2016
- Country: India
- Broadcast area: India; Bangladesh; Nepal; Sri Lanka; Pakistan; Maldives

Programming
- Languages: English; Hindi; Telugu; Kannada; Malayalam; Tamil; Bengali
- Picture format: 1080p HDTV

Ownership
- Owner: The Walt Disney Company (73%) and the National Geographic Society (27%); Operated by JioStar in India
- Parent: JioStar
- Sister channels: National Geographic Wild; JioStar channels

History
- Launched: 1 July 1998; 28 years ago

Links
- Website: www.natgeotv.com/in

National Geographic India (also known as Nat Geo India) is an Indian pay television channel owned by the National Geographic Global Networks unit of Disney Entertainment and National Geographic Partners, a joint venture between The Walt Disney Company (73%) and the National Geographic Society (27%). The distribution and broadcasting within the Indian market is now managed under the JioStar, a joint venture between Viacom18 and Disney India. It mainly telecasts non-fiction, documentaries involving nature, science, culture, and history, produced by the original American network It broadcasts in seven languages (English, Hindi, Telugu, Kannada, Malayalam, Tamil and Bengali).

A HD version of the channel, National Geographic HD was launched on 20 February 2010.

== Shows ==
The channel broadcast the following shows:

- Air Crash Investigation
- Airport Security Brazil
- Airport Security Colombia
- Airport Security First Class
- Airport security Madrid
- Airport Security Peru
- Airport Security Rome
- Animal Fight Club
- Animals Gone Wild
- Banged Up Abroad
- Battle of the Beasts
- Brain Games
- Chain of Command
- China Revealed
- Combat Zone
- Deadly Game
- Dirty Rotten Survival
- Do or Die
- Do or Die: The Animals
- Europe from Above
- Extreme Flight
- Genius: Picasso
- Gordon Ramsay: Uncharted
- Gourmet Goes Tribal
- India's Incredible Rescue Ops
- India's Jungle Heroes
- India's Mega Kitchens
- Investigates
- Land of the Giants: Wild Fish
- Monkey Thieves
- Primal Survivor
- Primal Survivor: Mighty Mekong
- Science of Stupid
- Snakes in the City
- Snakes SOS: Goa's Wildest
- Taboo
- Ultimate Animal Countdown
- Mega Factories
- Wicked Tuna
- Wicked Tuna: Outer Banks
- World's Weirdest

== Sister channels ==
=== Dissolved channels ===
Channel	Logo	SD/HD Availability	Defunct	Notes
Adventure One		SD	2007	
Nat Geo Adventure		SD+HD	2014	
Nat Geo People		SD+HD	2019	
Nat Geo Music		SD+HD	2019	
Nat Geo Telugu		SD+HD	2020	
Nat Geo Tamil		SD+HD	2020	
