= Star Gold Network =

Indian television movie channels

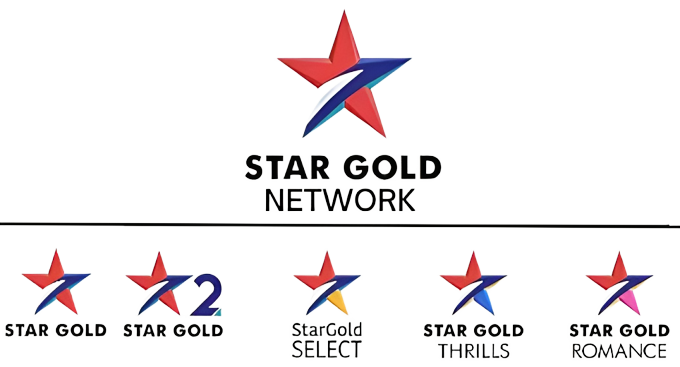
- Logos used since 2020
- Type: Television Channels
- Country: India
- Broadcast area: Indian subcontinent

Programming
- Language: Hindi
- Picture format: 1080p HDTV (downscaled to letterboxed 576p for the SDTV feed)

Ownership
- Owner: JioStar
- Sister channels: JioStar Channels

History
- Launched: June 4, 1999; 27 years ago

Availability

Streaming media
- JioHotstar: India

Star Gold Network is a group of Indian Hindi-language pay television movie channels, owned by JioStar, a joint venture between Viacom18 and Disney India. With a total of eight channels, Star Gold broadcasts Hindi films and occasional sporting events in Hindi audio feed.

== History ==
Star Gold was launched by Star India on 17 September 2000, as a part of Rupert Murdoch's media conglomerate, News Corporation. It was created to cater to the growing demand for Bollywood films on television. Star Gold is launched as a classic Hindi movie channel, airing a mix of old and new films.

In 2004, Star Gold rebrands to a mainstream Bollywood channel, focusing on recent blockbusters and popular stars. Star Gold becomes the most-watched Hindi movie channel in India.

In 2011, Star Gold launched its HD feed along with Star Plus, Star Movies, Star World and National Geographic in which Star termed as 'Asli HD'.

Star India launches a new movies channel Star Gold Select in 2017. The Walt Disney Company acquires 21st Century Fox, including Star India. Later in 2020, MoviesOK was rebranded to Star Gold 2. In 2021 Star Gold is rebranded as Utsav Gold in UK and Europe. On 15 March 2023, UTV Action and UTV Movies rebranded into Star Gold Thrills and Star Gold Romance

== Associated channels ==
=== Star Gold ===
Star Gold is a flagship movie channel launched in 2000 also the 1st channel of Star Network. It focuses on showcasing a wide variety of Bollywood films, including blockbuster releases, critically acclaimed cinema, and popular classics and music videos Hindi, Haryanvi, Punjabi and Bhojpuri languages.

=== Star Gold 2 ===
Star Gold 2 is an Indian Hindi-language movie pay television channel owned by JioStar which serves as a sister channel to Star Gold. While its SD feed was launched first as a replacement for Movies OK, its HD feed has replaced UTV HD.

=== Star Gold Select ===
Star Gold Select is an Indian Hindi language movie pay television channel. It replaced Star Movies Action owned by Disney Star (now known as JioStar) which primarily telecasts critically acclaimed movies. The HD version was launched on March 6, 2017, The SD version was launched on June 28, 2017.

=== Star Gold Thrills ===
Star Gold Thrills is an Indian Hindi language movie television channel owned by JioStar which primarily telecasts Hollywood action-based movies, dubbed in Hindi. Also telecasting Hindi language film in genres of action, suspense, thriller and horror from Disney Star (as Star Studios). It replaced UTV Action.

=== Star Gold Romance ===
Star Gold Romance, launched in 2023, is a dedicated movie channel featuring romantic Bollywood films. This specialized channel curates films that highlight themes of love, relationships, and emotions, targeting audiences who enjoy romance-centric cinema. Before its current identity, it was formerly known as UTV Movies during its early operation under UTV's portfolio, prior to its integration and rebranding under Disney Star.

=== Colors Cineplex ===
Colors Cineplex is a group of Indian Hindi-language 24/7 movie channels, owned and operated by JioStar, a joint venture between Viacom18 and Disney India. The flagship channel, also named Colors Cineplex, primarily broadcasts Bollywood films, catering to a broad audience with a mix of contemporary hits, classic cinema and Sports events. It was launched on 8 May 2016 as Rishtey Cineplex.

=== Colors Cineplex Bollywood ===
Colors Cineplex Bollywood is a Hindi language free-to-air movie channel in India, owned by JioStar, a Joint Venture between Viacom18 & Disney India The channel primarily focuses only on Bollywood movies and it became the third movie channel after Colors Cineplex and Colors Cineplex Superhits from the same parent company.

=== Colors Cinplex Superhits ===
Colors Cineplex Superhits is a Hindi language free-to-air movie channel in India, owned by JioStar, a Joint Venture between Viacom18 & Disney India It was launched on 1 April 2022. It replaced the movie channel Rishtey Cineplex.
