= BTVI =

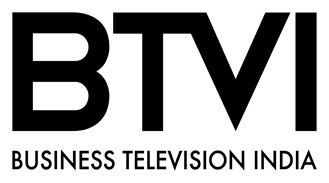
- Country: India
- Broadcast area: Global
- Headquarters: New Delhi, India

Programming
- Language: English
- Picture format: 1080i, HDTV

Ownership
- Owner: Business Broadcast News Pvt. Ltd (BBNPL).

History
- Launched: 2008; 17 years ago
- Closed: 2019; 6 years ago
- Former names: Bloomberg UTV, UTVi, Bloomberg TV India

Business Television India (BTVI), formerly known as Bloomberg TV India, Bloomberg UTV and UTVi, was a 24-hour English news channel in India, with a focus on Business and economic news.

== History ==
The UTVi English business news channel was launched by UTV in April 2008, along with a content deal for ABC News through Disney-ABC International Television (Asia Pacific). Bloomberg also took a stake in the channel in 2008. By late 2009, UTVi had rebranded as Bloomberg UTV, as UTV had switched to Bloomberg for additional content. Reliance Group purchased UTV's stake in 2012 causing another rebranding to Bloomberg TV India.

On 1 August 2016, the channel was rechristened as BTVI from Bloomberg TV India after the licensing agreement between Business Broadcast News and Bloomberg L.P. came to an end. Earlier in January, both Business Broadcast News and Bloomberg had decided not to renew their licensing agreement, ending a seven-year-old partnership.

On 31 August, the channel suspended broadcast without citing any reason. In a message to its employees just hours prior, it said it has closed the gap with the market leader (CNBC TV18) to emerge as the second largest business channel. It ceased transmission in September 2019.
