= UTV Action =

Indian Hindi-language movie TV channel

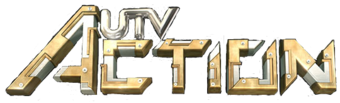
- Country: India
- Network: The Walt Disney Company India
- Headquarters: Mumbai, Maharashtra

Programming
- Picture format: 4:3 576i (SDTV)

Ownership
- Owner: The Walt Disney Company India
- Sister channels: Disney Star channels

History
- Launched: 1 January 2010; 16 years ago
- Closed: 15 March 2023; 2 years ago
- Replaced by: Star Gold Thrills
- Former names: Bindass Movies

UTV Action (formerly Bindass Movies) was an Indian pay television movie channel that featured American animated and live-action Hollywood movies in Hindi dub. It also often aired other world cinema. It was based partly in Mumbai. Initially launched as Bindass Movies, a youth-oriented Hindi movie channel, it was later rebranded as UTV Action in 2010 and was replaced by Star Gold Thrills in 2023.

== Sister channels ==
=== UTV HD ===
UTV HD was an Indian Hindi-language pay television movie channel owned by Disney Star. The channel showcased Hindi dubbed international movies.

=== UTV Action Telugu ===
UTV Action Telugu was an Indian Telugu Hindi movie channel UTV Action that showed Hollywood movies dubbed into Telugu. It was launched on 26 June 2011 and closed down on 30 November 2012.
