= Viacom18 =

Indian media venture

Studio18 Media Private Limited
- Trade name: Studio18
- Type: Joint venture
- Industry: Media conglomerate
- Predecessor: Viacom18
- Founded: 2007; 19 years ago
- Founders: MTV Networks International; Network18 Group
- Headquarters: Lower Parel, Mumbai, Maharashtra, India
- Area served: Worldwide
- Key people: Kevin Vaz (CEO – Entertainment); Kiran Mani (CEO – Digital); Sanjog Gupta (CEO – Sports)
- Owners: Reliance Industries (83.88%); Bodhi Tree Systems (16.11%)
- Website: viacom18.com

Studio18 Media Private Limited, (formerly Viacom18 Media Private Limited) is a subsidiary of Reliance Industries. It owned television channels and a film production studio in India. However, its assets were merged with Disney Star to form a newly merged entity, JioStar. Post-merger, it is the largest shareholder in JioStar with a 46.82% stake.

== History ==
=== Founding and early years (2007–2013) ===
Viacom18 was founded in 2007 as a joint venture between Network18 Group and Viacom.

In January 2010, Viacom18 went international with the launch of Colors in the United States. The channel is called Aapka Colors. In July 2010, it entered into a 50/50 distribution joint venture with Sun Network to form Sun 18.

In December 2011, Viacom18 launched Nickelodeon Sonic, targeting children.

=== ETV Network acquisition and rebranding (2014–2017) ===
On 22 January 2014, TV18 acquired the TV assets of ETV Network that were not in the Telugu language for ₹2,053 crore, with permission to use the ETV brand name.

In March 2015, Viacom18 decided to rebrand all five ETV regional general entertainment channels that were not in the Telugu language. ETV Marathi, ETV Gujarati, ETV Kannada, ETV Bangla, and ETV Odia were rebranded into Colors Marathi, Colors Gujarati, Colors Kannada, Colors Bangla, and Colors Odia respectively.

=== Viacom's share acquisition (2018–2019) ===
The company also owns Viacom18 Studios. On 31 January 2018, TV18 announced its acquisition of Viacom's majority stake in the joint venture, taking operational control and leaving Viacom with a minority interest. On 1 October 2019, Viacom18 launched Colors HD in Malaysia on Astro Malaysia; every serial was served with Malay and English subtitles.

The company signed a deal with the National Basketball Association to deliver live NBA games to all of its own networks.

=== Attempted mergers with Sony and Z (Formerly known as Zee), partnership with Bodhi Tree Systems (2020–2023) ===
In June 2020, Sony's Indian unit Sony Pictures Networks entered talks with Viacom18 regarding a merger, though the discussions advanced much later. The merger was supposed to provide Sony with a 74% shareholding in the merged company. However, in October 2020, Reliance Industries, the majority shareholder in Viacom18, terminated the merger.

In June 2021, reports stated that Viacom18 and Zee Entertainment Enterprises were in talks about a merger. However, Z (formerly Zee) denied any talks about a potential merger with Viacom18, later entering talks with Sony Pictures Networks, which was also in talks about a merger with Viacom18 earlier.

In January 2022, there were reports that Lupa India, an investment company set up by Uday Shankar and James Murdoch, was in the final stages of picking up a 39% stake in Viacom18, thereby turning Paramount Global into a minority shareholder with a 10% share in the company. In April 2022, Reliance announced that Bodhi Tree Systems, a company founded by Shankar and Murdoch with backing from the Qatar Investment Authority, would make a US$1.8 billion investment in Viacom18 to "jointly build India's leading entertainment platform and pioneer the Indian media landscape's transformation to a 'streaming-first' approach." As part of the venture, JioCinema—a streaming service owned by Reliance's mobile operator Jio—would be brought under Viacom18. Paramount would remain a stakeholder and content partner. The deal was approved by the Competition Commission of India (CCI) in September 2022. The sale was completed on 17 April 2023, with Bodhi Tree acquiring a 13.08% stake in the venture and diluting Paramount Global's stake to 13.01%.

=== Merger with Disney Star (2023–2024) ===
In December 2023, it was announced that The Walt Disney Company India and Reliance had signed a non-binding term sheet for a merger. According to its terms, Reliance would hold 51% of the merged company in cash and stock, while Disney would own the remaining 49%. For purposes of the merger, a subsidiary of Viacom18 was to be created to absorb Disney Star through a stock swap, pending ratification and regulatory approval.

In February 2024, Disney and Reliance reached a deal to merge their streaming and television assets, with the joint venture valued at $8.5 billion including synergies. As part of the deal, Viacom18 merged into Disney Star with Disney holding a 36.84% stake in the combined entity. This brought together assets such as linear television entertainment channels StarPlus, Colors TV and the Star Gold Network, sports channels Star Sports and Sports18 and the streaming services JioCinema and Disney+ Hotstar. The joint venture was led by Nita Ambani as chairperson, with Uday Shankar as vice chairperson, with Reliance receiving 16.34% and Viacom18 receiving 46.82%. It was expected to close sometime in late 2024 or early 2025 pending regulatory approval.

In March 2024, it was reported that Paramount Global (now Skydance) was looking to sell its 13.01% stake in Viacom18 to Reliance, which already owned a 73.91% stake via TV18. Although Bloomberg News reported that the deal was unlikely to close, it was confirmed a week later for $517 million, with its closure subject to regulatory approval and the completion of the joint venture between Viacom18 and Disney. Paramount would, however, continue to license its content to the company.

On 14 May 2024, it was reported that the deal between Disney and Reliance was approved by National Company Law Tribunal.

On 28 August 2024, the CCI approved the merger of Disney+ Hotstar with Viacom18.

On 28 September 2024, the Central government gave a nod to the transfer of the non-news and current affairs TV channels held by Viacom18 to Star India subject to conditions laid by the Competition Commission of India.

On 14 November 2024, Viacom18's media and entertainment operations were combined with those of Disney's Star India to form JioStar, a joint venture between Reliance and Disney.

=== Restructuring and Renaming (2024–present) ===
On 30 December 2024, Viacom18 Media Private Limited was renamed to Studio18 Media Private Limited. Moreover, 24.61 crore compulsorily convertible preference shares (CCPS) were converted into equity shares, which increased RIL’s stake in Studio18 to 83.88%. Studio18 also ceased to be a subsidiary of Network18 and was brought under direct control of RIL.

== See also ==
- Paramount International Networks
- Paramount Networks EMEAA
- Skydance
- Network18 Group
- Reliance Industries
