= Sports18 =

Indian sports TV channel

Sports18 Network
- Type: Sports
- Country: India
- Broadcast area: Indian subcontinent
- Network: Viacom18
- Headquarters: Mumbai, India

Programming
- Languages: English, Telugu, Kannada, Malayalam, Tamil, Bangla, Hindi
- Picture format: 1080i HDTV

Ownership
- Owner: Viacom18
- Key people: Nita Ambani

History
- Launched: 2022; 4 years ago
- Closed: 2025; 1 year ago
- Replaced by: Star Sports

Links
- Website: sports18.com

Sports18 Network was a group of Indian multinational pay television sports channels owned by Viacom18. Initially launched on 15 April 2022, the network broadcast various flagship sports tournaments. On 15 March 2025, the network was discontinued, and its channels were integrated into the Star Sports Network.

== Channels ==
Channel	Launched	Defunct	Language	Availability	Notes
Sports18 1	15 April 2022	15 March 2025	Hindi	SD+HD	Rebranded as Star Sports 2 Hindi
Sports18 2	1 November 2023	15 March 2025	Telugu	SD	Rebranded as Star Sports 2 Telugu
Sports18 3	1 November 2023	15 March 2025	Tamil	SD	Rebranded as Star Sports 2 Tamil
Sports18 Khel	25 April 2022	15 March 2025	Hindi	SD	Rebranded as Star Sports Khel

== Programming ==
=== Football ===
==== Club ====
- Indian Super League

==== National ====
- Indian football team home matches

=== Cricket ===
==== Club ====
- Indian Premier League
- Women's Premier League

==== National ====
- Indian National Cricket Team home matches

== See also ==
- Paramount International Networks
- Paramount Networks EMEAA
- Viacom18
- Network18 Group
