= JioCinema =

Indian video on-demand streaming service

- Screenshot JioCinema App Screenshot
- Company type: Streaming
- Website type: OTT platform
- Available in: Bengali; Bhojpuri; English; Gujarati; Hindi; Kannada; Malayalam; Marathi; Odia; Punjabi; Tamil; Telugu; Haryanvi; Japanese
- Dissolved: 14 February 2025; 21 months ago (merged with Disney+ Hotstar)
- Predecessor: Voot
- Successor: JioHotstar
- Headquarters: Mumbai, Maharashtra, India
- Area served: Indian subcontinent
- Owner: Viacom18
- Founder: Jio Platforms
- Key people: Mukesh Ambani; Akash Ambani
- Industry: Streaming; Entertainment; Mass media
- Products: Streaming media; video on demand; digital distribution
- Services: On-demand video streaming; Film distribution
- Commercial: Yes
- Registration: Optional
- Users: 15 million (As of 2024)
- Launched: 5 September 2016; 10 years ago

JioCinema was an Indian subscription video-on-demand over-the-top streaming service owned by Viacom18. The service was merged with Disney+ Hotstar on 14 February 2025, to form JioHotstar.

In April 2022, the service was brought under Reliance's Viacom18 joint venture, backed by new funding from Uday Shankar and James Murdoch's Bodhi Tree Systems. JioCinema began to subsume Viacom18's existing streaming platform Voot later that year, beginning with sports programming in October, and Voot being officially discontinued in favour of JioCinema in August 2023.

== History ==
=== Launch (2016–2019) ===
JioCinema was launched on 5 September 2016 by Jio Platforms as part of a suite of apps and services exclusive to Jio mobile subscribers, with JioCinema app for Android and iOS. In December 2017, JioCinema added a web-based version for PCs. A JioCinema app was also released for Jio's KaiOS-based Jio Phone.

In 2019, Intex, TCL, and Xiaomi announced that they would include JioCinema apps with their smart TVs.

=== Viacom18 era (2022–2023) ===
In April 2022, Viacom18, a joint venture between Paramount Global and Jio's parent company Network18 Group—announced that Qatar-backed Bodhi Tree Systems (founded by former Disney Asia-Pacific president Uday Shankar and former 21st Century Fox CEO James Murdoch) would make a major investment in the company with a focus on bolstering its streaming businesses. As part of the deal, JioCinema would be brought under Viacom18. In September 2022, the Competition Commission of India approved the transaction, which was completed in April 2023.

In October 2022, before the 2022 FIFA World Cup, it was announced that Viacom18 sports content would move from their existing streaming platform Voot to JioCinema, with all World Cup matches streaming for free. The platform was made available to all users, including non-Jio users. Its coverage faced criticism from viewers on social media for initially having technical issues such as buffering; JioCinema stated that it would work to address these issues.

JioCinema launched a premium tier on 15 May 2023, anchored by a content agreement with Warner Bros. Discovery that saw rights to HBO and Max original productions move to JioCinema from its competitor, Disney+ Hotstar. JioCinema also announced a similar library agreement with NBCUniversal, including Universal Pictures, Universal Television, and Peacock productions.

Voot began to migrate its original productions to JioCinema in June 2023, including new seasons of Asur and Bigg Boss OTT. In August 2023, Voot was discontinued, with JioCinema assuming its content library, and existing Voot Select subscribers being migrated to JioCinema Premium.

=== Merger with Disney+ Hotstar (2024–2025) ===
In October 2024, Employees of RIL revealed that Disney+ Hotstar and JioCinema will officially merge into a single platform. Back in February 2024, Reliance and Disney agreed on a $8.5 billion merger of their media assets. Nita Ambani will serve as the chairperson of the merged entity while Uday Shankar from Bodhi Tree Systems will be the vice-chair. Shortly after news of the merger reached the media and the public, a user known as "A Dreamer" registered the domain name "jiohotstar.com". The user requested Reliance to fund his education in exchange for the domain; initially requesting £93,345 from Reliance, matching the fees for his education programme. However, this request was turned down by Ambujesh Yadav, AVP of Commercials at Reliance.

In December 2024, Reliance Industries acquired the domain jiohotstar.com, giving rise to speculations that Disney+ Hotstar and JioCinema would officially merge into a single platform.

On 14 February 2025, JioCinema along with Disney+ Hotstar were merged and launched as JioHotstar, subsequently JioCinema transferred existing subscribers to JioHotstar.

== Content ==
=== Current partners ===
- Balaji Telefilms
- Eros Now
- Muse Communication
- Peacock
- Paramount+
- Shemaroo Entertainment
- HBO Max

=== Indian content ===
In December 2018, JioCinema partnered with Disney India to offer Disney+ Hotstar content on the JioCinema app. Disney has withdrawn from this deal after the introduction of Disney+ Hotstar in India.

In December 2019, JioCinema partnered with Sun NXT to host over 4,000 films available on the Sun NXT platform across four Indian languages: Tamil, Telugu, Kannada, and Malayalam. In May 2020, JioCinema partnered with Hoichoi to provide Hindi-dubbed Bengali content.

=== International content ===
In May 2022, Paramount Global announced that Paramount+ would launch in India through Viacom18 in 2023, however Paramount never launched its streaming platform in India and instead brought their content to JioCinema Premium.

In April 2023, Jio Studios unveiled a slate of 100 new titles that would eventually be available on JioCinema. The same month, Warner Bros. Discovery announced an agreement with JioCinema for it to carry HBO and Max original programming, as well as other Warner Bros. Television Studios content. The deal succeeds a previous agreement with Hotstar and Amazon Prime Video, respectively. HBO content would premiere day-and-date with their U.S. broadcast. HBO and Warner Bros. content would launch in May 2023 as part of the new JioCinema Premium tier.

In May 2023, NBCUniversal announced a similar agreement, which will add a Peacock hub to JioCinema Premium featuring first-run and library content from Universal Television, Universal Pictures, Universal Content Productions, and Sky Studios, along with Peacock original programming.

In November 2023, Viacom18 secured a deal to bring Pokémon shows and movies to JioCinema.

In May 2024, JioCinema struck the deal with anime licensor Muse Communication to bring the Anime series into their JioCinema Premium subscription, including to simulcast the fourth season of hit anime Demon Slayer.

== Original programming ==
=== List of original shows ===
Title	Premiere date	Original language(s)	Genre(s)
Inside Story: A Season With Rajasthan Royals	2020	English	Television documentary
Illegal - Justice, Out of Order	12 May 2020	Hindi, English	Legal thriller
Bigg Boss OTT 1	8 August 2021		Reality television
Inspector Avinash	18 May 2023	Hindi	Crime drama
Crackdown	30 May 2023	Hindi	Spy thriller
Asur	1 June 2023	Hindi	Crime thriller
UP65	8 June 2023	Hindi	Comedy
Rafuchakkar	15 June 2023	Hindi	Heist comedy
Bigg Boss OTT 2	17 June 2023	Hindi	Reality television
Ishq Next Door	3 July 2023	Hindi	Romantic comedy
The Magic Of Shiri	13 July 2023	Hindi	Drama
Do Gubbare	20 July 2023	Hindi	Drama comedy
Kaalkoot	27 July 2023	Hindi	Crime drama
Taali	15 August 2023	Hindi	Biography
Lakhan Leela Bhargava ( LLB )	21 August 2023	Hindi	Legal drama comedy
Bajao	25 August 2023	Hindi	Musical drama
Temptation Island India: Pyaar Ki Pariksha	3 November 2023	Hindi	Dating reality
Good Old Days	23 November 2023	Telugu	Romantic drama
Jab Mila Tu	22 January 2024	Hindi	Romantic drama
Ranneeti: Balakot & Beyond	25 April 2024	Hindi	Action drama
Murder In Mahim	10 May 2024	Hindi	Crime thriller
Dhawan Karenge with Shikhar Dhawan	20 May 2024	Hindi	Talk show
Gaanth, Chapter 1 : Jamnaa Paar	11 June 2024	Hindi	Crime thriller
Bigg Boss OTT 3	21 June 2024	Hindi	Reality television
PrimeTime With the Murthys	3 July 2024	Hindi English	Comedy drama
Pill	12 July 2024	Hindi	Medical thriller
Dus June ki Raat - Chapter 1	4 August 2024	Hindi	Comedy thriller
Shekhar Home	14 August 2024	Hindi	Crime drama
MTV Dark Scroll	16 August 2024	Hindi	Paranormal reality
Khalbali Records	12 September 2024	Hindi	Musical drama
Honeymoon Photographer	27 September 2024	Hindi	Crime thriller
Doctors	27 December 2024	Hindi	Medical drama

=== List of original films ===
Title	Premiere date	Original language(s)	Genre
Mimi	26 July 2021	Hindi	Comedy-drama
Dasvi	7 April 2022	Hindi	Social-comedy
Kacchey Limbu	19 May 2023	Hindi	Sports drama
Boo	27 May 2023	Telugu; Tamil	Horror
Mumbaikar	2 June 2023	Hindi	Crime thriller
Bloody Daddy	9 June 2023	Hindi	Action-thriller
Gulaam Chor	11 June 2023	Gujarati	Mystery thriller
I Love You	16 June 2023	Hindi	Romantic thriller
Aseq	23 June 2023	Hindi	Horror thriller
Sergeant	30 June 2023	Hindi	Thriller
Blind	7 July 2023	Hindi	Thriller
Unaad	8 July 2023	Marathi	Drama
Ishq-e-Nadaan	14 July 2023	Hindi	Romantic drama
Trial Period	21 July 2023	Hindi	Comedy
One Friday Night	28 July 2023	Hindi	Mystery thriller
Hey Kameeni	22 December 2023	Hindi	Drama
Ek Kori Prem Katha	5 April 2024	Hindi	Drama
Dedh Bigha Zameen	31 May 2024	Hindi	Drama
Blackout	7 June 2024	Hindi	Comedy thriller
Ghudchadi	9 August 2024	Hindi	Comedy drama
Tikdam	23 August 2024	Hindi	Drama
Visfot	6 September 2024	Hindi	Crime thriller
Jo Tera Hai Woh Mera Hai	20 September 2024	Hindi	Comedy drama
Amar Prem Ki Prem Kahani	4 October 2024	Hindi	Romantic drama
The Miranda Brothers	25 October 2024	Hindi	Drama
Khwaabon Ka Jhamela	8 November 2024	Hindi	Romantic comedy

=== List of short films ===
Title	Premiere date	Original language(s)	Genre
The Comedian	29 September 2023	Hindi	Comedy-drama
Birha : The Journey Back Home	30 September 2023	Punjabi	Drama
Bebaak	1 October 2023	Hindi	Drama
Rat in the Kitchen	2 October 2023	Hindi	Neo-noir thriller
Mein Mehmood	3 October 2023	Hindi	Drama
Gangster Ganga	4 October 2023	Hindi	Drama
Munna Ka Bachpan	5 October 2023	Hindi	Drama
Ghuspaith	6 October 2023	Hindi	Drama
The Daughter	7 October 2023	Hindi	Drama
Laar	8 October 2023	Hindi	Drama
Kofuku	9 October 2023	Hindi	Drama
Armaand	10 October 2023	Hindi	Drama
Coming Out With the Help Of a Time Machine	11 October 2023	Hindi	Drama
The Last Envelope	12 October 2023	Hindi	Drama
Murakh: The Idiot	13 October 2023	Hindi	Drama
Maachis Ki Dibiya	14 October 2023	Hindi	Drama
Ring Mili Kya	15 October 2023	Hindi	Comedy
Dammy	16 October 2023	Hindi	Drama
Before We Die	17 October 2023	Hindi	Drama
Phone Call	18 October 2023	Hindi	Drama

== Availability and access ==
As of April 2024, JioCinema re-launched the JioCinema Premium subscription service, with pricing starting at Rs. 29 per month. This service offers ad-free streaming, support for up to 4K video quality, and offline viewing capabilities. A family plan available at Rs. 89 per month allows simultaneous access on four screens.

== Viewership ==
As per Statista's Q2 2020 report, JioCinema had a 7% market share among many competitors like Netflix and Amazon Prime Video, which had a 20% market share each; Disney+ Hotstar, which had a 17% market share; ZEE5 with a 9% market share; ALTBalaji and SonyLIV, which had a 4% market share each; and other streaming platforms, which had a 19% market share.

The 2023 Indian Premier League final set a new record for concurrent viewership of a streaming broadcast. JioCinema reported that the match peaked at 32 million concurrent viewers (beating a record set during the 2019 Cricket World Cup by Hotstar) and was seen by over 120 million unique viewers.

== See also ==
- List of Netflix India original programming
- List of Amazon India originals
- List of Disney+ Hotstar original programming
- List of SonyLIV original programming
- List of ZEE5 original programming
- Over-the-top media services in India
