= Uday Shankar (businessman) =

Indian journalist and media executive

- Education: B.A. Patna University; M.A. & MPhil Jawaharlal Nehru University
- Occupations: Journalist; Media Leader; Investor
- Organization(s): Founder and Director, Bodhi Tree Systems (2020 – Present); Vice Chairman, JioStar (2024 – Present); Chairman, Allen Career Institute (2022-Present)
- Board member of: JioStar India Private Limited (2025-Present); Studio18 Media Private Limited (2023–Present; ALLEN Career Institute (2022–Present); Apollo Health and Lifestyle Limited (2022–Present); The Great Eastern Shipping Company Limited (2022–Present); Business Standard Private Limited (2021–Present); Kotak Mahindra Bank (2019–Present); Vidhi Centre for Legal Policy (2022-Present); US-India Strategic Partnership Forum (USISPF) (2018–Present); Malaria No More (2018–2025)

Uday Shankar (pronounced: [U-dai Shun-kar] /ˈuːdeɪ ˈʃʌŋkər/, born September 16, 1961) is a media leader and entrepreneur. He is the co-founder and director of Bodhi Tree Systems, a strategic investment platform focused on consumer sectors in emerging markets. He also serves as vice chairman of JioStar, India's largest media and entertainment company, and chairman of ALLEN Career Institute, one of India's largest test preparation companies.

Variety featured Shankar in its annual Variety500 list of global entertainment business leaders, recognising a career spanning more than three decades across journalism, broadcasting, and digital media.

Shankar began his career as a journalist with the Times of India and worked with multiple publications before transitioning to television news. He was a founding member of the team that launched Aaj Tak, the country's first 24-hour Hindi news channel, where he played a central role in establishing its breaking news format. He subsequently led Star News, shifting its editorial direction toward in-depth interviews and regional-language programming.

In 2007, Shankar became CEO of Star India, becoming the first Indian journalist to head a major entertainment network. In a profile, McKinsey & Company described his leadership at Star India as having reshaped the Indian media and entertainment landscape. Star expanded from a primarily Hindi-language broadcaster into a diversified media and sports network with significant regional operations. He also led the company's early entry into digital streaming with the launch of Hotstar, at a time when limited connectivity and high data costs made the Indian market challenging for streaming services. The platform, combining entertainment,sports, and films, grew to become one of the largest mobile streaming services globally by user base.

Shankar's career then moved to the global stage. In 2017, he was appointed President of 21st Century Fox Asia. Following Disney's acquisition of Fox, he became President of The Walt Disney Company Asia Pacific, and launched Disney+ across the Asia Pacific region and Disney+ Hotstar in India.

Shankar has held leadership roles in Indian industry associations and policy bodies. In 2020, he became the first media executive elected President of the Federation of Indian Chambers of Commerce and Industry (FICCI). He also served as President of the Indian Broadcasting Foundation (now the Indian Broadcasting and Digital Foundation), where he was involved in initiatives including the rollout of India's digital direct-to-home (DTH) broadcasting infrastructure, the establishment of audience measurement systems, and the creation of a self-regulatory framework for content complaints.

Shankar sits on the boards of several Indian companies, including Kotak Mahindra Bank and GE Shipping, and supports social initiatives such as the Vidhi Centre for Legal Policy.

He received the Forbes India Leadership Award for Best CEO (MNC) in 2015, the first media and entertainment executive to receive the honour, and in 2019 was ranked 15th on India Today's list of 50 Most Powerful People in India — the only media executive on the list.

== Early life and education ==
Uday Shankar spent his early years in Patna, Bihar, where he completed his schooling and undergraduate degree. He later moved to Delhi to pursue an M.A. in History at Jawaharlal Nehru University (JNU). He later completed an M.Phil at JNU in 1989. Reflecting on his time at JNU, Shankar said it "opened [his] eyes to a very different way of looking at the world" and sparked his interest in journalism.

== Career ==
=== Journalism and News Media Career (1989–2007) ===
==== Print Report and Early Influences ====
Starting as a political correspondent with The Times of India in Patna, Shankar reported on politics of post-liberalisation India, gaining a grassroots understanding of the country's social and political fabric.

In 1992, seeking to explore issues that received limited mainstream attention, Shankar moved to Delhi and joined Down to Earth, a publication dedicated to environmental and policy journalism. In an interview with The Caravan, Shankar noted that this period of intensive field reporting shaped his approach to identifying subject-matter experts and formulating questions.

While working in print journalism, Shankar was drawn to the advent of television broadcasting in India in the early 1990s. In later interviews, he recalled that watching CNN's coverage of the Gulf War convinced him that television could expand news access to audiences across India's linguistic and literacy divides. He subsequently transitioned from print to broadcast journalism.

==== Redefining News Broadcasting in India ====
As a founding member of the team which launched Aaj Tak—India's first 24-hour news channel, Shankar developed the "Breaking News" format. Aaj Tak's live field-based coverage of the 2001 Gujarat Earthquake, the 9/11 terror attacks, and the War on Terror in Afghanistan marked a shift in how Indian audiences consumed news. Aroon Purie, then head of the India Today Group, later noted, "he took news out of the studios, into the streets and even with poor connectivity, he streamed events live whenever he could."

In 2004, Shankar left Aaj Tak to take charge of Media Content and Communication Services India Pvt. Ltd., which operated Star News. He shifted the channel's programming toward in-depth interviews and debates with politicians and public figures, moving away from the breaking news format he had helped establish at Aaj Tak. He also oversaw the launch of Bengali and Marathi channels to tap the growing regional market and introduced entertainment-oriented segments to engage India's expanding female audience.

=== Corporate Leadership in Media and Entertainment (2007–2020) ===
Following the departure of Star India's two senior-most executives to launch a competing network, Shankar was appointed first as Chief Operating Officer and shortly thereafter as Chief Executive Officer. He was the first journalist to lead a major Indian entertainment network. In a profile, McKinsey & Company described his subsequent tenure as one that reshaped not only Star India but the broader Indian media and entertainment landscape.

==== Reimagining Content Strategy ====
Shankar directed a shift in the network's programming approach. Star discontinued long-running ratings leaders,including Kaun Banega Crorepati and serials from Balaji Telefilms. According to Forbes India, this marked a deliberate departure from legacy formats, which Shankar determined were no longer aligned with evolving audience preferences.

To develop replacement programming, Star expanded its research and audience insights operations, with particular focus on understanding viewers in smaller towns and tier-two cities. This informed a slate of programmes featuring female protagonists and updated production approaches, reflected in the network's tagline "Rishte Wahi, Soch Nayi".

This programming direction led to the production of Satyamev Jayate, a prime-time series that addressed social issues, caste discrimination, dowry, medical malpractice, and LGBTQ rights. The show's first episode drew 90 million viewers, demonstrating both audience interest in socially-oriented programming and its commercial viability.

==== Championing Regional Programming ====
When Shankar became CEO, Star India's programming was predominantly Hindi-language, with Star Plus as the flagship channel and primary revenue source. This left large regional audiences underserved and created significant dependence on a single channel.

Shankar initiated a phased expansion into regional-language markets, which he described in interviews as motivated by his belief in India's cultural and linguistic diversity. In 2008, Star launched Star Jalsha in Bengali, followed by Star Pravah in Marathi later that year. In 2009, the company acquired a controlling stake in Asianet Communications, adding Malayalam, Kannada, and Telugu networks to its portfolio. This was followed in 2015 by the acquisition of Maa TV, a Telugu broadcaster. These regional channels achieved leading positions in their respective markets, diversifying the network's revenue base beyond Hindi-language content.

==== Expanding the Sports Ecosystem ====
During Shankar's tenure, Star India made a significant push into sports broadcasting, acquiring rights to major cricket tournaments, including the Indian Premier League (IPL) and International Cricket Council (ICC) events. These acquisitions involved substantial financial commitments at a time when sports rights in India were considered high-risk investments with uncertain returns.

At a time when Indian sports broadcasting focused largely on live match coverage, the network introduced regional language commentary in multiple languages, developed new advertising formats, and created supplementary programming to deepen viewer engagement and improve monetisation.

Building on the success of cricket, Shankar sought to diversify Star India's sports portfolio. In 2014, he led the launch of the Pro Kabaddi League (PKL), a franchise-based competition built around kabaddi—a traditional sport widely played across India but largely confined to rural audiences with limited prior television presence. The league's inaugural season drew over 435 million viewers, establishing it as the second-most-watched sport in India after cricket.

=== Building India's First Scaled Streaming Platform ===
In 2015, Shankar led Star India's launch of Hotstar, one of India's first streaming platforms offering live sports, television programming, and films in multiple Indian languages. The launch preceded widespread affordable mobile data and smartphone access in India. Speaking at Disney's Investor Day in 2019, Shankar said Star had anticipated the shift in content consumption toward mobile devices and built Hotstar for scale, prioritising a scaled advertising platform over the nascent subscription market.

Following the launch of Reliance Jio's 4G network in 2016, which significantly reduced mobile data costs in India, Hotstar's user base expanded rapidly. Within two years of launch, the platform exceeded 100 million downloads on Android, becoming one of the world's largest streaming services by mobile user base.

==== Transition to Regional and Global Leadership ====
In December 2017, Shankar was appointed President of 21st Century Fox Asia, with responsibility for the company's video businesses across the continent, including Star India and Fox Networks Group Asia. The Murdoch leadership credited Shankar with the transformation of Star India and said his expanded role would sharpen the company's strategic focus across the continent.

Following Disney's acquisition of 21st Century Fox in 2019, Shankar was President of Walt Disney Asia Pacific and Chairman of Star and Disney India, overseeing operations across key markets in the region.

In April 2020, Shankar led the launch of Disney+ Hotstar in India, integrating Disney's streaming service with the existing Hotstar platform. At launch, Hotstar had more than 300 million monthly active users, making it India's largest streaming service. He subsequently oversaw the rollout of Disney+ Hotstar in Indonesia in September 2020, and Disney+ launches in Singapore and other Asia Pacific markets. Rebecca Campbell, then chair of Disney's Direct-to-Consumer and International segment, later credited Shankar with helping establish Disney's streaming position across the region.

In October 2020, Shankar announced his departure from Disney to pursue entrepreneurial opportunities, leading to the founding of Bodhi Tree Systems.

=== Business and Investment Leadership – Bodhi Tree Systems (2021–Present) ===
In 2021, Uday Shankar co-founded Bodhi Tree Systems in partnership with James Murdoch's Lupa Systems. The platform was established on the thesis that capital, deployed with strategic intent, could create lasting value in consumer-facing sectors in emerging markets — with investments directed toward industries such as media, education, healthcare, and consumer technology across India and Southeast Asia.

==== Investment in ALLEN Career Institute ====
In April 2022, Bodhi Tree Systems acquired a stake in ALLEN Career Institute, India's leading education company, to support its digital expansion and technological transformation. Shankar was nominated to ALLEN's board of directors and Nitin Kukreja (former CEO, Star Sports) was appointed CEO of the company.

==== Investment in Viacom18 and formation of JioStar ====
That same year, Bodhi Tree Systems acquired stake in Viacom18, the media and entertainment arm of Reliance Industries. Shankar joined Viacom18 as a non-executive director, shepherding its strategic push in digital content and sports broadcasting. Viacom18's streaming platform JioCinema emerged as India's leading digital entertainment destination following Bodhi Tree's entry.

In February 2024, Reliance Industries and The Walt Disney Company signed a binding agreement to merge Viacom18 and Star India, creating an $8.5 billion media joint venture. Nita Ambani was named Chairperson of the combined entity, and Uday Shankar was appointed Vice Chairperson, overseeing strategy across television, streaming, and sports.

As part of his role, Shankar also exercises strategic oversight of JioHotstar, a streaming platform that combinesViacom18 and Star India's content libraries. By early 2025, JioHotstar had crossed 200 million paying subscribers, ranking among the top three global streaming services.

== Legacy and Influence ==
Beyond his corporate and investment leadership, Uday Shankar has played a defining role in shaping India's media ecosystem, policy discourse, and industry leadership.

=== Industry Governance and Policy Reform ===
==== Indian Broadcasting and Digital Foundation ====
As President of the Indian Broadcasting Foundation (IBF) from 2010–12 and 2014–16, Shankar was involved in several industry-wide initiatives.

He worked with the Ministry of Information & Broadcasting on the digitisation of India's cable television network, a project aimed at expanding channel capacity, improving picture quality, and increasing transparency in subscriber reporting.

In 2010, Shankar was a founding member of the Broadcast Audience Research Council (BARC), a tripartite body comprising broadcasters, advertisers, and media agencies established to create a standardised audience measurement system.

In 2011, Shankar oversaw the establishment of the Broadcast Content Complaints Council (BCCC), an independent self-regulatory body for non-news general entertainment channels. The BCCC introduced a content code and structured complaint process for viewer grievances.

==== Federation of Indian Chambers of Commerce ====
In 2020, Shankar became the first media executive elected President of the Federation of Indian Chambers of Commerce and Industry (FICCI). In this role, he highlighted the importance of media to India's economic future and advocated for innovation, digital transformation, and regulatory modernisation, while fostering closer dialogue between industry and government.

=== Mentorship and Talent Development ===
During his tenure at Star India, Shankar developed an approach to hiring and leadership development that drew attention within the Indian media industry. Rather than recruiting primarily from traditional broadcast backgrounds, he hired professionals from sectors including technology, fast-moving consumer goods, telecommunications, consulting, and journalism, seeking what he described as adaptable and curious individuals willing to take risks.

Speaking at the CII Big Picture Summit in 2025, Shankar emphasised adaptability over fixed skills, noting that specific technical competencies become outdated while the capacity to acquire new ones remains valuable. "The world will keep changing, but you need to be prepared to embrace that change and run at the same speed," he said.

Several executives who worked under Shankar at Star India subsequently moved into senior leadership positions at prominent global and Indian companies, spanning technology, media, sports governance, and social media platforms. Media industry publications including Exchange4media and Impact have described this pattern as evidence of a distinct leadership development culture during Shankar's tenure, with Exchange4media characterising Star India under his leadership as a "leadership factory."

== Awards and Recognition ==
- 2019: Honorary Doctorate from Bennett University – Recognised for his contributions to media, entertainment, and digital transformation.
- 2019: Ranked 15th in India Today's Power List – 50 Most Powerful People in India – Acknowledged for shaping the Indian media and broadcasting landscape.
- 2018: Included in Variety 500 as one of the world's top executives – Featured among the most influential global media leaders.
- 2018: Named in Indian Express 100 Most Powerful Indians – The only media executive included in the list.
- 2016: Winner of Ernst and Young's Entrepreneurial CEO – Recognised for expanding Star India's footprint and driving sixfold business growth.
- 2015: Forbes India Leadership Award – Best CEO (MNC) – First media and entertainment industry executive to receive this honour.
- 2015: Media Game Changer of the Year at the 3^{rd} IAA Leadership Awards – Acknowledged for redefining the Indian media ecosystem.
- 2014: Named IMPACT Person of the Decade by IMPACT Magazine – Celebrated for his transformative contributions to Indian television and digital media.
- 2013: RedInk Award for Journalism for Satyamev Jayate – Recognised for leveraging television to drive social change.
- 2012: Honoured by the National Commission for Scheduled Castes for Satyamev Jayate – Awarded for using media to raise awareness of social discrimination and caste-related issues.
- 2012: Satyamev Jayate awarded the CNN-IBN 'Indian of the Year' Special Achievement Award - Acknowledging its path-breaking initiative in addressing social issues.
- 2010: Industry Leadership Award, Indian Film Festival Los Angeles – Recognised for redefining India's media landscape and expanding Star's reach across multiple platforms.
