= List of Telugu-language television channels =

Telugu TV Channels

Position of Andhra Pradesh in India

This is a list of satellite and digital television channels in Telugu language (spoken primarily in the Indian states of Andhra Pradesh and Telangana) broadcasting at least throughout the Telugu states and in India.

Position of Telangana in India

== State owned channels ==
Channel	Launch	Video	Audio	Owner	Notes
DD Saptagiri	1993	SD	Stereo | 2.0	Doordarshan, Prasar Bharati	Official channel of the State Government of Andhra Pradesh
DD Yadagiri	2014	SD	Stereo | 2.0	Doordarshan, Prasar Bharati	Official channel of the State Government of Telangana

== General entertainment ==
Channel	Launch	Video	Audio	Owner	Notes
Sun Gemini	1995	SD+HD	Stereo | 2.0	Sun TV Network	First Telugu GEC channel
ETV	1995	SD+HD	Stereo | 2.0	ETV Network	
Star Maa	2002	SD+HD	Stereo | 2.0	JioStar	Formerly known as Maa TV
Zee Telugu	2004	SD+HD	Stereo | 2.0	Zee Network	Formerly known as Alpha Telugu

=== Defunct ===
Channel	Launch	Defunct	Video	Audio	Owner	Notes
Asianet Sitara	2008	2010	SD	Stereo | 2.0	Asianet communication	Replaced as Asianet Movies

== Movies ==
Channel	Launch	Video	Audio	Owner	Notes
Sun Gemini Movies	2000	SD+HD	Stereo | 2.0	Sun TV Network	Formerly known as Teja TV
Star Maa Movies	2011	SD+HD	Stereo | 2.0	JioStar	Formerly known as Maa Movies
Star Maa Gold	2013	SD	Stereo | 2.0	JioStar	Replaced from Maa Junior
ETV Cinema	2015	SD+HD	Stereo | 2.0	ETV Network	
Zee Cinemalu	2016	SD+HD	Stereo | 2.0	Zee Entertainment Enterprises	

=== Defunct ===
Channel	Launch	Defunct	Video	Audio	Owner	Notes
UTV Action Telugu	2011	2012	SD	Stereo | 2.0	UTV	
Gemini Action	2012	2012	SD	Stereo | 2.0	Sun TV Network	

== Music ==
Channel	Launch	Video	Audio	Owner	Notes
Sun Gemini Music	2005	SD+HD	Stereo | 2.0	Sun TV Network	Formerly Aditya TV
Star Maa Music	2008	SD	Stereo | 2.0	JioStar	Formerly Maa Music
Raj Musix Telugu	2013	SD	Stereo | 2.0	Raj Television Network	

== Comedy ==
Channel	Launch	Video	Audio	Owner	Notes
Sun Gemini Comedy	2009	SD	Stereo | 2.0	Sun TV Network	Formerly Navvulu TV
ETV Plus	2015	SD	Stereo | 2.0	ETV Network	

== Kids ==
Channel	Launch	Video	Audio	Owner	Notes
Kushi TV	2009	SD	Stereo | 2.0	Sun TV Network	

=== Telugu audio feed ===
- Cartoon Network
- Discovery Kids
- Disney Channel
- Disney Junior
- ETV Bala Bharat
- Hungama TV
- Nick Jr.
- Nickelodeon
- Nickelodeon Sonic
- Pogo
- Sony Yay
- Super Hungama

=== Defunct ===
Channel	Launch	Defunct	Video	Audio	Owner	Notes
Maa Junior	2011	2013	SD	Stereo | 2.0	Maa Television Network	Rebranded as Star Maa Gold

== Sports ==
Channel	Launch	Video	Audio	Owner	Notes
Star Sports 1 Telugu	2018	SD+HD	Stereo | 2.0	JioStar	
Star Sports 2 Telugu	2025	SD+HD	Stereo | 2.0	JioStar	Replaced with Sports18 2
Sony Ten 4	2021		Stereo | 2.0	Culver Max Entertainment	Also available in Tamil language

== Lifestyle and infotainment ==
Channel	Launch	Video	Audio	Owner	Notes
Vanitha TV	2008	SD	Stereo | 2.0	Rachana Television Pvt Ltd	Women-Oriented
ETV Abhiruchi	2015	SD	Stereo | 2.0	ETV Network	Cookery

=== Telugu audio feed ===
Note: These channels are available in Telugu audio feed.

- Discovery Channel
- History TV18
- Nat Geo Wild
- National Geographic
- Sony BBC Earth

=== Defunct ===
Channel	Launch	Defunct	Video	Audio	Owner	Notes
ETV Abhiruchi HD	2017	2019	HD	Stereo | 2.0	ETV Network	Launched only in Hathway
ETV Life HD	2017	2019	HD	Stereo | 2.0	ETV Network	Launched only in Hathway

== Religious ==
Channel	Launch	Video	Audio	Owner	Notes
Subhavatha TV	2006	SD	Stereo | 2.0	Good News Televisions	Christian based channel
Sri Venkateswara Bhakti Channel	2007	SD	Stereo | 2.0	Tirumala Tirupati Devasthanam	
Bhakti TV	2010	SD	Stereo | 2.0	Rachana Television	
Swara Sagar	2011	SD	Stereo | 2.0	Infra Media	
Aaradhana TV	2013	SD	Stereo | 2.0	TV5	
CVR OM	2014	SD	Stereo | 2.0	CVR Television Pvt Ltd	
Hindu Dharmam	2017	SD	Stereo | 2.0	Shreya Broadcasting Pvt Ltd	
ETV Life	2017	SD	Stereo | 2.0	ETV Network	

== Non-genre ==
Channel	Launch	Video	Audio	Owner	Notes
Vissa	2003	SD	Stereo | 2.0	Raj Television Network	
Sun Gemini Life	2012	SD	Stereo | 2.0	Sun TV Network	Lifestyle, fashion, health, religion, education
Studio One Plus	2012	SD	Stereo | 2.0	Rachana Television Pvt Ltd	Currently available Airtel digital TV
Studio Yuva	2020	SD	Stereo | 2.0	Rachana Television Pvt Ltd	

== News ==
Channel	Launch	Video	Audio	Owner	Notes
ETV Andhra Pradesh	2004	SD	Stereo | 2.0	ETV Network	Formerly known as ETV2
TV9 Telugu	2004	SD	Stereo | 2.0	Associate Broadcasting Company	Formerly known as TV9
NTV	2007	SD	Stereo | 2.0	Rachana Television Pvt Ltd	
TV5	2007	SD	Stereo | 2.0	Shreya Broadcasting Pvt Ltd	
ABN Andhra Jyothi	2009	SD	Stereo | 2.0	Aamoda Broadcasting Company Pvt Ltd	
HMTV	2009	SD	Stereo | 2.0	Hyderabad Media Pvt Ltd	
Sakshi TV	2009	SD	Stereo | 2.0	Indira Television Ltd	
Raj News	2010	SD	Stereo | 2.0	Raj TV Network	
Studio N	2011	SD	Stereo | 2.0	Narne Network	
T News	2011	SD	Stereo | 2.0	Telangana Broadcasting company	
6TV Telangana	2012	SD	Stereo | 2.0	LCGC Broadcasting	
V6 News	2012	SD	Stereo | 2.0	Vishaka Industries Media	
10TV	2013	SD	Stereo | 2.0	Spoorthi Communications Pvt Ltd	
99TV	2014	SD	Stereo | 2.0	New Waves Media	
ETV Telangana	2014	SD	Stereo | 2.0	ETV Network	Formerly known as ETV3
MOJO TV	2016	SD	Stereo | 2.0	Visaka Industries Media	
Prime9 News	2018	SD	Stereo | 2.0	Samhitha Broadcasting Pvt Ltd	
Swatantra TV	2022	SD	Stereo | 2.0	Ascendas Broadcasting Pvt Ltd	
Zee Telugu News	2023	SD	Stereo | 2.0	Zee Media Corporation	Launched on 10 April 2023 (as a TV channel)
Big TV Telugu	2023	SD	Stereo | 2.0	Big TV News Network	Relaunched Again on 26 July 2026

=== Defunct ===
Channel	Launch	Defunct	Video	Audio	Owner	Notes
Gemini News	2004	2019	SD	Stereo | 2.0	Sun TV Network	
Zee 24 Gantalu	2007	2012	SD	Stereo | 2.0	Zee Media Corporation	

== High Definition (HD) channels ==
Note: HD channels are added with Dolby Atmos audio system.

=== General entertainment ===
Channel	Launch	Video	Audio	Owner
Sun Gemini TV HD	2011	HD	Dolby Digital | 5.1	Sun TV Network
ETV HD	2016	HD	Stereo | 2.0	ETV Network
Star Maa HD	2016	HD	Stereo | 2.0	JioStar
Zee Telugu HD	2017	HD	Stereo | 2.0	Zee Entertainment Enterprises

=== Movies ===
Channel	Launch	Video	Audio	Owner	Notes
Sun Gemini Movies HD	2017	HD	Dolby Digital | 5.1	Sun TV Network	
Star Maa Movies HD	2017	HD	Stereo | 2.0	JioStar	
Zee Cinemalu HD	2017	HD	Stereo | 2.0	Zee Entertainment Enterprises	
ETV Cinema HD	2018	HD	Stereo | 2.0	ETV Network	currently available in hathway dth

=== Music ===
Channel	Launch	Video	Audio	Owner
Sun Gemini Music HD	2017	HD	Dolby Digital | 5.1	Sun TV Network

=== Sports ===
Channel	Launch	Video	Audio	Owner	Notes
Star Sports 1 Telugu HD	2023	HD	Stereo | 2.0	JioStar	
Star Sports 2 Telugu HD	2025	HD	Stereo | 2.0	JioStar	

=== Telugu audio feed ===
- Animal Planet HD
- Cartoon Network HD+
- Discovery HD
- Disney Channel HD
- ETV Bal Bharat HD
- History TV18 HD
- Investigation Discovery HD
- Nat Geo Wild HD
- National Geographic HD
- Nickelodeon HD+
- Sony BBC Earth HD
- Sony Pix HD
- TLC HD

== See also ==
- List of HD channels in India
- List of Tamil language television channels
- List of Malayalam-language television channels
- List of Kannada language television channels
