= ETV =

ETV may stand for:

== Television ==
- Educational television, the use of television in education
- Enhanced TV, an interactive television application specification

=== Africa ===
- e.tv, South Africa
  - e.tv Ghana, the channel's Ghanaian feed
- ETV (Ethiopia), Ethiopian Broadcasting Corporation

=== Asia ===
- Ekushey Television, a Bangladeshi television channel
- Educational Television (Hong Kong), a programming block
- India
  - ETV Andhra Pradesh
  - ETV Bal Bharat, Hyderabad
  - ETV Bangla, now Colors Bangla
  - ETV Bihar, now News18 Bihar-Jharkhand
  - ETV Gujarati, now Colors Gujarati
  - ETV Hindi, now News18 Uttar Pradesh Uttarakhand
  - ETV Marathi, now Colors Marathi
  - ETV Network, a satellite television network
  - ETV News Kannada, now News18 Kannada
  - ETV (Telugu)
  - ETV Urdu, now News18 Urdu
- NHK Educational TV, Japan
- ETV (Mongolia)
- ETV (Sri Lanka), a terrestrial television network

=== Europe ===
- Eesti Televisioon, the Estonian national public television station.
- ETV (Greece), now Epsilon TV, a regional television channel.
- Económico TV, a defunct Portuguese television channel

=== North America ===
- Mississippi Educational Television, a public broadcasting network in the United States
- South Carolina Educational Television, a public broadcasting network in the United States

== Other ==
- Electric track vehicle, a motorized vehicle in a rail-based conveyor system
- Emergency tow vessel, a type of large tug boat used in ocean rescue
- Electro-Thermal Vaporisation, a inductively coupled plasma mass spectrometry technique
- Endoscopic third ventriculostomy, a treatment for hydrocephalus
- Entecavir, an oral antiviral drug used in the treatment of hepatitis B
- Environmental Technology Verification Program of the US Environmental Protection Agency
- e-Tourist Visa, a subcategory of e-Visa for tourists to India
