= Media in Vijayawada =

Media in Vijayawada is well-developed, and the city has a basic network of optical fiber cables. The city's telephone system is serviced by four landline companies: BSNL, Tata Indicom, Reliance and Airtel. There are a number of mobile-phone companies: Aircel, BSNL, Airtel, Uninor, MTS, Tata Indicom, Tata Docomo, and Jio. Several companies offer broadband internet access.

== Broadcast radio ==
The city has a variety of AM and FM radio stations. AlR Vijayawada, also known as "Aakasavani Vijayawada", is one of the oldest serving FM radio stations in the city. Most of the stations have broadcast 24 hours a day, seven days a week with programming in Telugu and English.

The FM radio stations in the city are:

- AIR Vijayawada Akashvani 103.4 MHz
- AIR Rainbow 102.2 MHz
- Radio City 91.1 MHz
- BIG FM 92.7 92.7 MHz
- Red FM 93.5 MHz
- Ee FM 91.9 MHz
- Radio Mirchi 98.3 MHz

The AM radio stations in the city are:

- AIR Vividh Bharati 1503 kHz
- AIR FM Gold 828 kHz
- AIR FM South Vijayawada (A) 837 kHz

== Internet radio ==
- Radio Tulip (24/7 Non-Stop Telugu live radio) website Retrieved 2017-04-01.
- Radio Khushi (24/7 Telugu online radio) website Retrieved 2011-09-05.
- TeluguOne Radio (24/7 Telugu live radio website Retrieved 2011-09-05.
- Tharangamedia website

== Television networks ==
The Doordarshan Telugu channel, DD Saptagiri, was the first TV channel launched in Hyderabad in the year 1974. After bifurcation of Andhra Pradesh state, DD Saptagiri was relegated to being telecast from Doordarshan Kendra Vijayawada for Andhra Pradesh while the existing network, renamed DD Yadagiri, was aimed at the Telangana populace

=== Satellite channels ===
- DD Saptagiri

=== Cable channels ===
- V Local
- Siti Channel
- C Channel
- MCN

== News papers ==
Visalaandhra was the first newspaper in the state, started from Vijayawada. As per the 58th annual report of Press India 2013–14, the large and medium Telugu daily publications from Vijayawada include Andhra Jyothy, Eenadu, Sakshi, Suryaa, Andhra Prabha, Vaartha, Prajasakti, and Udaya Bharatam.

Major English publications are Deccan Chronicle, The Hindu, The Times of India, News Boom, The Fourth Voice, The New Indian Express and Views Observer.

== Magazines ==
Vijayawada has several magazines in Telugu and English languages.

=== Telugu ===
- Neadu
- Swathi
- Navya
- Andhra Prabha
- Andhra Jyotii
- Crime Today
- Vipula
- Chatura
- Vanitha
- Chandamama
- Great Andhra
- Santosham

=== English ===
- Amaravati Times
- B Positive
- India Today
