= List of Marathi-language television channels =

Marathi language television channels

The Marathi language television industry was started in India in 1984. Although earlier confined to a half an hour slot in the national television Doordarshan, the industry has now expanded with many commercial TV channels currently on air. Various dedicated categories like news and movies have been added and have considerably expanded the horizon of Marathi TV entertainment.

== Marathi news channels ==
Marathi television got its first round-the-clock news channel in the form of Saam TV in the year 2008 leading Marathi language News channel in the state. Nilesh Khare is the Channel Head and Editor of the channel since 2018. Zee Marathi News was launched in 2007. Disney Star launched its Marathi news channel Star Majha in June 2007, which was later named as ABP Majha from 1 June 2012. Network18 Group and Lokmat together formed a joint venture to launch IBN Lokmat in 2008 and which was later renamed as News18 Lokmat In 2008, News18 Marathi In 2026, Sakal Media Groups launched its first venture in television with Saam TV. Firstly it was info entertainment, but from 1 January 2018 it became a leading Marathi news channel. In 2009, TV9 Maharashtra launched. On 1 May 2013 another channel launched, namely Jai Maharashtra, by Mumbai-based media group Sahana Films. Lokshahi News channel was launched on 26 January 2020 by Swaraj Marathi Broadcasting LLP. Pudhari News, a news channel by Pudhari Publications Pvt. Ltd., was launched on 29 August 2023.

== List of channels ==
=== Government owned channel ===
Channel	Launch	Video	Audio	Owner
DD Sahyadri	1994	SD+HD	Stereo|2.0	Doordarshan|Prasar Bharati

=== General entertainment channels (GEC) ===
Channel	Launch	Video	Audio	Owner
Zee Marathi	1999	SD+HD	Stereo|2.0	Zee Entertainment Enterprises
Colors Marathi	2000	SD+HD	Stereo|2.0	JioStar
Star Pravah	2008	SD+HD	Stereo|2.0	JioStar
Sony Marathi	2018	SD	Stereo|2.0	Culver Max Entertainment
Sun Marathi	2021	SD+HD	Stereo|2.0	Sun TV Network
Zee Yuva	2016	SD	Stereo|2.0	Zee Entertainment Enterprises

==== Defunct channels ====
Channel	Launch	Defunct	Video	Audio	Owner
Prabhat TV	2001	2002	SD	Stereo|2.0	
Tara Marathi	1999	2006	SD	Stereo|2.0	
Mi Marathi	2007	2017	SD	Stereo|2.0	Sri Adhikari Brothers Group (SAB)
Mr. TV	2019	2019	SD	Dolby Digital	Shemaroo Entertainment
Q Marathi	2022	2023	SD	Stereo 2.0	Q You Media

=== Informative ===
Channel	Launch	Video	Audio	Owner
Discovery Channel	1995	SD+HD	Stereo|2.0	Warner Bros. Discovery India

=== Movies ===
Channel	Launch	Video	Audio	Owner
Zee Talkies	2007	SD+HD	Stereo|2.0	Zee Entertainment Enterprises
Fakt Marathi	2011	SD	Stereo|2.0	Enterr10 Television Network
Shemaroo Marathibana	2019	SD	Stereo|2.0	Shemaroo Entertainment
Pravah Picture	2022	SD+HD	Stereo|2.0	JioStar

==== Defunct channel ====
Channel	Launch	Defunct	Video	Audio	Owner
Chitrapat Marathi	2016	2018	SD	Stereo 2.0	Parls Group
Zee Chitramandir	2021	2026	SD	Stereo 2.0	Zee Entertainment Enterprises

=== Music ===
Channel	Launch	Video	Audio	Owner
9X Jhakaas	2008	SD	Stereo|2.0	9X Media
Maiboli	2013	SD	Stereo|2.0	Sri Adhikari Brothers Television (SAB)
Sangeet Marathi	2015	SD	Stereo|2.0	Media Worldwide Limited
MH1 Marathi	2027	MH One TV Network Ltd		

==== Defunct channel ====
Channel	Launch	Defunct	Video	Audio	Owner
Zee Vajwa	2020	2022	SD	Stereo|2.0	Zee Entertainment Enterprises

=== Kids ===
==== Defunct channels ====
Channel	Launch	Defunct	Video	Audio	Owner
Pogo	2004	2005	SD	Stereo|2.0	Warner Bros. Discovery India
Discovery Kids	2012	2013	SD	Stereo|2.0	Warner Bros. Discovery India
Sony YAY!	2017	2018	SD	Stereo|2.0	Culver Max Entertainment
ETV Bal Bharat	2021	2022	SD	Stereo|2.0	ETV Network

=== Sports ===
==== Defunct channel ====
Channel	Launch	Defunct	Video	Audio	Owner
Star Sports 1 Marathi	2019	2023	Full HD	Stereo|2.0	JioStar

=== News ===
Channel	Launch	Video	Audio	Owner
ABP Majha	2007	SD	Stereo|2.0	ABP Group (Formerly Star India)
News18 Marathi	2007	SD	Stereo|2.0	JioStar (Formerly Network18)
Saam TV	2007	SD	Stereo|2.0	Sakal Media Group
Zee 24 Taas	2007	SD	Stereo|2.0	Zee Media Corporation
TV9 Marathi	2009	SD	Stereo|2.0	Associated Broadcasting Company Private Limited (ABCPL)
Jai Maharashtra	2013	SD	Stereo|2.0	Sahana Group
Lokshahi News	2020	SD	Stereo|2.0	Swaraj Marathi Broadcasting LLP
Pudhari News	2023	SD	Stereo|2.0	Pudhari Publications Pvt. Ltd.
NDTV Marathi	2024	SD	Stereo|2.0	NDTV

==== Defunct channels ====
Channel	Launch	Defunct	Video	Audio	Owner
Maharashtra1	2011	2020	Full HD	Stereo|2.0	First India Group Asia Limited
News State Maharashtra Goa	2022	2024	HD	Stereo|2.0	News Nation Network Pvt Ltd

== Marathi HD channels ==
Channel	Genre	Launch	Broadcast	Video	Audio	Owner
Colors Marathi HD	GEC	20 July 2015	Own Schedule	Full HD	Dolby Digital|7.1	JioStar
Star Pravah HD	GEC	1 May 2016	Own Schedule	Full HD	Dolby Digital|7.1	JioStar
Zee Marathi HD	GEC	20 November 2016	Own Schedule	Full HD	Dolby Digital|7.1	Zee Entertainment Enterprises
Sun Marathi HD	GEC	28 November 2023	Own Schedule	Full HD	Dolby Digital|7.1	Sun TV Network
DD Sahyadri HD	GEC	11 July 2025	Own Schedule	Full HD	Dolby Digital|7.1	Prasar Bharati
Zee Talkies HD	Movies	15 October 2016	Own Schedule	Full HD	Dolby Digital|7.1	Zee Entertainment Enterprises
Star Pravah Picture HD	Movies	15 May 2022	Own Schedule	Full HD	Dolby Digital|7.1	JioStar
