= TV18 =

Branch of Network 18

TV18 Broadcast
- Formerly: Global Broadcast News; IBN18 Broadcast Limited
- Type: Public
- Traded as: BSE: 532800; NSE: TV18BRDCST
- Industry: Television
- Founded: 6 June 2005; 21 years ago
- Founder: Ritu Kapur; Raghav Bahl
- Defunct: 3 October 2024; 2 years ago
- Fate: Transferred all its assets to Network18 Group
- Successor: Network18 Group
- Headquarters: Mumbai, India
- Owner: Reliance Industries (56.89%)
- Website: nw18.com

TV18 Broadcast Limited (formerly Global Broadcast News and IBN18 Broadcast Limited) was an Indian television company based in Mumbai and owned by Network18 Group. TV18 owned and operated various national channels in separate partnerships with Versant (CNBC TV18, CNBC Awaaz and CNBC-TV18 Prime HD) and Skydance (CNN-News18). In October 2024, it merged with its parent company Network18 Group.

In the regional space, the group operated a Gujarati business news channel – CNBC Bajar, a Marathi general news channel – News18 Lokmat and operated ten regional news channels under the News18 umbrella and 3 regional entertainment channels under the News18 brand. The group also operated a 24-hour Indian news channel in English – News18 India, targeting global audiences.

TV18 and Viacom18 had formed a strategic joint venture called IndiaCast, a multi-platform 'content asset monetisation' entity that drove domestic and international channel distribution, placement services and content syndication for the bouquet of channels from the group and third parties.

On 31 January 2018, TV18 increased its stake in the Viacom18 joint venture to 51% taking operational control.

== Owned channels ==
Channel	Launched	Language	Category	SD/HD availability	Notes
History TV18	2011	English; Hindi; Marathi; Tamil; Telugu	Knowledge	SD+HD	Joint Venture with A&E Networks
CNBC TV18	1999	English	News	SD+HD	
CNN News18	2005	English	News	SD	Previously known as CNN-IBN
News18 India	2005	Hindi	News	SD	Previously Known as IBN7, founded as Channel 7
CNBC Awaaz	2005	Hindi	News	SD	
News18 Rajasthan	2000	Hindi	News	SD	Previously known as ETV Rajasthan
News18 Uttar Pradesh Uttarakhand	2002	Hindi	News	SD	Previously known as ETV Uttar Pradesh/Uttarakhand
News18 Madhya Pradesh Chhattisgarh	2002	Hindi	News	SD	Previously known as ETV Madhya Pradesh/Chhattisgarh
News18 Bihar Jharkhand	2002	Hindi	News	SD	Previously known as ETV Bihar/Jharkhand
News18 Punjab Haryana	2014	Punjabi	News	SD	Previously known as ETV Haryana/Himachal Pradesh
News18 Odia	2015	Odia	News	SD	Previously known as ETV News Odia
News18 Urdu	2001	Urdu	News	SD	Previously known as ETV Urdu
News18 Kannada	2014	Kannada	News	SD	Previously known as ETV News Kannada
News18 Bangla	2014	Bengali	News	SD	Previously known as ETV News Bangla
News18 Gujarati	2014	Gujarati	News	SD	Previously known as ETV News Gujarati
CNBC Bajar	2014	Gujarati	News	SD	
News18 Assam North East	2016	Assamese	News	SD	
News18 Marathi	2008	Marathi	News	SD	Previously known as News18 Lokmat
News18 Kerala	2015	Malayalam	News	SD	
News18 Tamil Nadu	2015	Tamil	News	SD	
News18 Jammu Kashmir Ladakh Himachal	2022	Kashmiri, Ladakhi	News	SD	
