= Andhra Jyothi =

Indian Telugu-language daily newspaper

- Front page of Andhra Jyothi newspaper, 5 June 2024
- Type: Daily newspaper
- Format: Broadsheet
- Owner(s): K. L. N. Prasad (founder); Vemuri Radhakrishna (M.D.)
- Publisher: Aamoda Publications Pvt. Limited
- Editor: N.Rahul Kumar
- Founded: 1 July 1960, Vijayawada, Andhra Pradesh
- Language: Telugu
- Headquarters: Hyderabad, India
- Circulation: 375,661 (as of 2022)
- Website: www.andhrajyothy.com

Andhra Jyothi (Telugu: ఆంధ్రజ్యోతి; lit. 'The light of Andhra') is the third largest circulated Telugu language daily newspaper of India. It is sold mostly in the states of Andhra Pradesh and Telangana. It was founded by K. L. N. Prasad, an industrialist, on 1 July 1960. It is one of the oldest running Telugu language daily newspapers. It was taken over by Vemuri Radhakrishna, also known as R. K., in 2002, who is also the managing director.

== Details ==
The paper is published from 21 centers across the states of Andhra Pradesh, Telangana, Karnataka, and Tamil Nadu. Vemuri Radhakrishna, a senior journalist turned entrepreneur, is its managing director, and journalist N.Rahul Kumar is its editor. It is the third-largest circulated Telugu daily, according to the Audit Bureau of Circulation (ABC), and is known for its dynamic political reporting. Andhra Jyothi has a vast reporting network across Andhra Pradesh and Telangana, and also has a considerable presence in New Delhi, Tamil Nadu, Karnataka, Orissa, and Chhattisgarh.

The group also owns a Telugu TV news channel, ABN Andhra Jyothi, and a weekly magazine, Navya.

According to the Audit Bureau of Circulation for the H12022, Andhra Jyothi had a circulation of 375,661, ranked at 17th place among daily newspapers in India. Its circulation during Q2 2019 was 664,352. Circulation dropped by 43.45% over a three year period.

== Criticism ==
Though it initially started as a neutral and non-political party oriented newspaper and was later taken over by a different organisations, the newspaper under this organization became an arch-rival to the previous Chief Minister of Andhra Pradesh Y. S. Jagan Mohan Reddy and his political party, YSR Congress Party. The newspaper and its managing director Vemuri Radha Krishna are often criticized for publishing news in support of the Chandrababu Naidu led Telugu Desam Party.

== See also ==
- Eenadu
- Sakshi
