= Sakshi (media group) =

Indian newsgroup

- Type: Private
- Industry: Mass media
- Founded: 2008 (18 years ago)
- Founder: Y. S. Jagan Mohan Reddy
- Headquarters: Hyderabad, Telangana, India
- Key people: Y. S. Jagan Mohan Reddy Y. S. Bharathi Reddy (Chairperson)
- Products: Publishing; broadcasting; web portals
- Subsidiaries: Sakshi newspaper; Sakshi TV; Sakshi Post
- Website: Sakshi.com

Sakshi (transl. The Witness) is an Indian Telugu-language media group. The group owns the daily newspaper Sakshi, 24-hour news channel Sakshi TV, and associated digital ventures. Its first asset, Sakshi newspaper, was launched on 23 March 2008 by Jagati Publications Ltd. owned by Y. S. Jagan Mohan Reddy. Sakshi TV was launched on 1 March 2009, by Indira Television Ltd., also owned by Reddy. The group is currently run under the chairmanship of Y. S. Bharathi Reddy, wife of Jagan Mohan Reddy.

As of 2019, Sakshi newspaper had an average daily circulation of 10.64 lakh, ranking second in circulation among Telugu daily newspapers behind Eenadu and sixteenth in India across languages.

The newspaper and TV channel are widely regarded as propaganda outlets for Jagan Mohan Reddy and his party YSR Congress Party (YCP).

== Sakshi newspaper ==
Sakshi newspaper is promoted by Jagati Publications Ltd. The newspaper was launched on 23 March 2008 with 23 editions — nineteen editions from Andhra Pradesh, and four from New Delhi, Mumbai, Bangalore, and Chennai. At a price of ₹60 per month, Sakshi was marketed as a less expensive alternative to all other prominent Telugu dailies at the time which were priced at ₹96–100 per month. To stand out from its competition, Sakshi adopted high-quality production values. It had 30-pages, all of them in colour broadsheet format. The paper's layouts were designed by Mario Garcia.

Of the total Andhra Pradesh Government budget of about ₹200 crore for print media commercials for the years 2008-11, Sakshi newspaper was allotted over 50% amounting to ₹101.63 crore. This was attributed to the undue preferential treatment Sakshi newspaper received during the chief ministership of Y. S. Rajasekhara Reddy.

Circulation

According to the Audit Bureau of Circulation, from July to December 2019, Sakshi had an average daily circulation of 10.64 lakh. It ranks second in circulation among Telugu daily newspapers behind Eenadu and sixteenth in India across languages.

== Sakshi TV ==
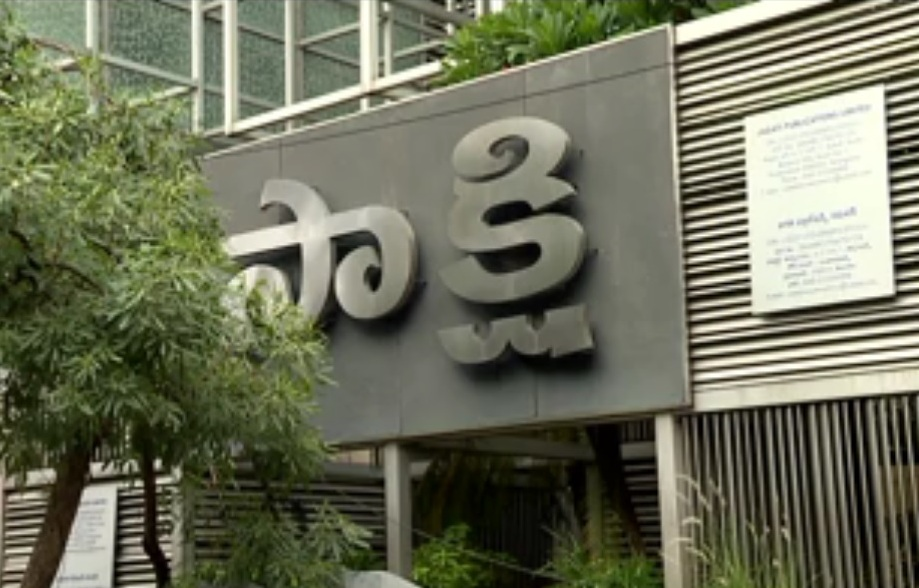
Façade of Sakshi TV building

Sakshi TV started airing on 1 March 2009. It is promoted by Indira Television Ltd., with Y. S. Jagan Mohan Reddy, son of then Chief Minister of Andhra Pradesh, Y. S. Rajashekhara Reddy, as the Chairman.

The channel was initially named Indira Priyadarsini. According to Ramakrishna Reddy, the first Editor-in-Chief of the channel, it was renamed to cash in on the popularity of the Sakshi newspaper which was launched a year before the channel by Jagan Mohan Reddy. At its launch, the channel claimed to be the first HDTV channel in the country. It was marketed as being primarily targeted at the youth.

Of the nearly ₹40 crore that Government of Andhra Pradesh spent on ads in electronic media for the years 2009-12, Sakshi TV got advertisements worth over ₹17 crore. This was attributed to the undue preferential treatment Sakshi TV received during the chief ministership of Y. S. Rajasekhara Reddy.

Sakshi TV has been found to be in breach of the News Broadcasting Standards Authority (NBSA) code of ethics on various occasions.

== Digital assets ==
- Sakshi.com - Telugu-language news portal. Publishes news in politics, business, crime, sports, science, entertainment, technology etc.
- Sakshi Post - English-language news portal, hosted on Sakshi.com at english.sakshi.com. Initially launched as Sakshipost.com in October 2012.
- Sakshi e-paper - Digital version of the Sakshi daily newspaper. Also contains archives of previous editions.
- Sakshi Live TV - Live video feed of Sakshi TV. Also contains video snippets and archives of previously telecasted shows.

== Sakshi Excellence Awards ==
Sakshi Excellence Awards is an annual awards ceremony organized by Sakshi media group to honour and recognize the individuals and institutions of various fields. Launched in 2015, it primarily rewards the people from the Telugu-speaking community across the world.

== Criticism ==
The newspaper and TV channel are widely regarded as propaganda outlets for Jagan Mohan Reddy and his party YSR Congress Party (YCP). They are criticized for their biased coverage of the political rivals of Reddy and YCP. Sakshi TV has been found to be in breach of the News Broadcasting Standards Authority (NBSA) code of ethics on various occasions. According to a CBI chargesheet filed against Jagan Mohan Reddy, most of the investments in the media group were quid pro quo bribes by those people who had benefited from their unfair deals with his father Y. S. Rajashekhara Reddy's government.

Sakshi group is part of a recent trend, wherein businesspersons-turned-politicians across India launched their own media organisations as a political strategy to influence public opinion to further their political interests.

=== Rajasekhara Reddy's death and conspiracy theory ===
On 2 September 2009, Y. S. Rajasekhara Reddy, father of Sakshi TV promoter Y. S. Jaganmohan Reddy, died in a helicopter crash. In January 2010, Sakshi TV broadcast a conspiracy theory advanced by the American journalist Mark Ames in the Russian online tabloid, The eXile. It alleged that the Ambani brothers of Reliance group of companies orchestrated the death of Rajasekhara Reddy. TV5 channel broke the story while Sakshi TV and NTV relayed the report aired by TV5.

The report led to massive attacks against the business establishments owned by the two Ambani brothers in Andhra Pradesh. On 8 January 2010, criminal cases were filed against Sakshi TV and NTV while two senior journalists of TV5 were arrested. Editors Guild of India asked the channels to desist from "irresponsible reporting" and condemned the reporting as sensational and against the principles of journalism.
