= Hyderabad Metro Rail Brand Ambassadors Campaign =

Hyderabad Metro Rail Brand Ambassadors (HMR–BA) campaign is an initiative of the Corporate Communication department of L&T Metro Rail (Hyderabad) Limited (LTMRHL) to find flag bearers for Hyderabad Metro Rail. There will be a citywide talent search where the brand ambassadors will be chosen based on the results of competitions.

== Concept ==
The initiative will select citizens of Hyderabad who wish to be a brand ambassador, in the category of companies (private, public or others), institutions (schools and colleges) and individuals such as senior citizens and housewives. The search is a multiple rounds competition that tests the individual's aptitude as an ambassador.

== Functions of an ambassador ==
Brand ambassadors duties will include:

- Launching stations,
- Flagging off trains,
- Conducting forums and workshops on metro related subjects,
- Interacting with people on the HMR subject,

== Ambassador qualities ==
- Personality
- Communication skills
- Mental ability
- Leadership skills

== Categories ==
The campaign is split across six categories, in two phases:

Phase 1:

- Students (school)
- Students (college)
- Executives

Phase 2:

- Senior citizens
- Housewives
- Others

=== Timeline ===
SN	Category	Dates(MM/DD/YYYY)	Day
1	Schools		
	School – registration start date	1/8/2013	Tuesday
	School – Registration end date	2/4/2013	Monday
	School – Auditions day 1	2/16/2013	Friday
	School – Auditions day 2	2/17/2013	Saturday
	School – Semi Finale	8/24/2013	Saturday
	School – Finale	9/22/2013	Sunday
2	College		
	College – Registration start date	1/8/2013	Tuesday
	College – Activations start date	1/28/2013	Monday
	College – Activations end date	3/30/2013	Monday
	College – Registration end date	7/31/2013	Wednesday
	College – Auditions day 1	8/23/2013	Friday
	College – Semi Finale	8/25/2013	Sunday
	College – Finale	9/22/2013	Sunday
3	Executives		
	Executives – Registration start date	1/8/2013	Tuesday
	Executives – Activations start date	3/5/2013	Tuesday
	Executives – Activations end date	4/24/2013	Saturday
	Executives – Registration end date	4/24/2013	Sunday
	Psychometric test duration	25 to 10 May	
	Executives – Auditions day 1	5/18/2013	Saturday
	Executives – Semi Finale	24 or 25 August 2013	Saturday / Sunday
	Executives – Finale	9/22/2013	Sunday
4	Senior Citizens and Housewives		
	Senior Citizens – Registration start date	1/8/2013	Tuesday
	Senior Citizens – Activations start date	3/30/2013	Saturday
	Senior Citizens – Activations end date	7/31/2013	Wednesday
	Senior Citizens – Registration end date	7/31/2013	Wednesday
	Senior Citizen – Semi Finale	24 or 25 August 2013	Saturday/Sunday
	Senior Citizen and Housewives – Finale	9/22/2013	Sunday
5	Others		
	Others – Registration start date	1/8/2013	Tuesday
	Others – Activations start date	5/4/2013	Saturday
	Others – Activations end date	7/31/2013	Wednesday
	Others – Registration end date	7/31/2013	Wednesday
	Others – Semi Finale	24 / 25 Aug 2013	Saturday / Sunday
	Others – Finale	9/22/2013	Sunday

== Launch ==
The campaign was launched on 8 January 2013 at a press conference attended by 200 press personnel and headed by V.B Gadgil, chief executive and managing director of LTMRHL, and Sanjay Kapoor, head of corporate communications.

V.B Gadgil said "Hyderabad Metro Rail Ambassadors campaign, conceptualised and promoted by LTMRHL is a unique initiative for the common man to avail the opportunity of becoming the Hyderabad Metro Rail – Brand Ambassador – A Celebrity".

== Reach ==
The advertising activities began after the press conference. The advertising campaigns are conducted through:

- Hoardings – from 8 January 2013 across key points in the city,
- Newspaper advertisements – from 9 January 2013 on leading newspapers,
- Radio broadcasts – from 11 January 2013 on leading radio channels.
- Visits to educational institutes.

== Partners ==
The Hyderabad Metro Rail Brand Ambassadors campaign is backed by:

- Prasads IMAX as the promotion partner
- AECOM as a Diamond Sponsor,
- United India Insurance as the Gold Sponsor
- Parsons Brinckerhoff as the gifts sponsor,
- TV5 and Zee 24 Gantalu as the campaign partners
- Annapurna Studios as the official venue partner
- Rachnoutsav Events Pvt Ltd as the official event partners,
