= ETV Andhra Pradesh =

Indian Telugu-language TV news network

- Country: India
- Network: ETV Network

Programming
- Language: Telugu

Ownership
- Owner: Ramoji Group
- Sister channels: ETV; ETV Telangana; ETV Plus; ETV Cinema; ETV Life; ETV Abhiruchi; ETV Bal Bharat

History
- Launched: 28 December 2003 (22 years ago)
- Founder: Ramoji Rao

Links
- Website: ETV Win

ETV Andhra Pradesh (formerly ETV2) is an Indian Telugu-language 24-hour news channel focusing on the state of Andhra Pradesh. The channel was launched by the media conglomerate ETV Network owned by Ramoji Group on 28 December 2003 as ETV2. Along with its rival TV9 Telugu, it is the oldest 24-hour news channel in Telugu. In May 2014, after the bifurcation of Andhra Pradesh, the channel was renamed as ETV Andhra Pradesh, while the then recently launched ETV3 channel was renamed as ETV Telangana.

== History ==
ETV Andhra Pradesh was launched on 28 December 2003 as ETV2 by the media conglomerate Ramoji Group as a 24-hour news channel focusing on the state of Andhra Pradesh which then also included present-day Telangana. It already had a test launch 10 days prior to that. At its launch it had an exclusive team of 150 staff reporters and 100 news contributors.

Along with TV9 (now TV9 Telugu) which was also launched around the same time period, ETV2 is the oldest 24-hour news channel in Telugu. The 2004 Andhra Pradesh Assembly elections and the Indian general elections helped ETV2 and its rival TV9 to become established in the market.

In February 2006, ETV Network had taken its two Telugu channels ETV and ETV2 to pay mode at a combined price of ₹10. However, its non-Telugu channels remained free-to-air (FTA).

As per TAM Media Research data, for the time period from April to June 2006, ETV2 was among the top 10 news channels in India in viewership share across languages.

It was reported in January 2014 that Network18 Group had bought 24.5 percent stake in the Telugu channels ETV and ETV2 along with acquiring 100 percent stake in the regional Hindi news channels of the ETV Network.

In May 2014, after the bifurcation of Andhra Pradesh, the channel was renamed as ETV Andhra Pradesh, while the then recently launched ETV3 channel was renamed as ETV Telangana.

== Programming ==
The programming at its launch included four half-hour news bulletins covering national, international, business and sports news. Also, there were four regional bulletins called Andhravani, and 13 hourly news bulletins of five minutes each.

The channel also has regular infotainment shows like Sukhi Bhava dedicated to health, Maya Bazar, a political satire; Telugu Velugu a perspective on the Telugu language; Pratidhwani an interactive show on consumer rights and law and order.

== See also ==
- ETV Network
- Ramoji Group
- Eenadu
