= Maruva Tarama =

2025 film by Chaitanya Varma Nadimpilli

- Directed by: Chaitanya Varma Nadimpilli
- Written by: Chaitanya Varma Nadimpilli
- Produced by: Giduturi Ramana Murthy; Rudraraju N. V. Vijaya Kumar Raju
- Starring: Hariish Dhanunjaya; Avanthika Hari Nalwa; Athulya Chandra
- Cinematography: Rudra Sai
- Edited by: K. S. R
- Music by: Vijay Bulganin
- Production company: Silver Screen Pictures
- Release date: 28 November 2025
- Country: India
- Language: Telugu

Maruva Tarama is a 2025 Indian Telugu-language romantic drama film written and directed by Chaitanya Varma Nadimpilli. The film is produced by Giduturi Ramana Murthy and Rudraraju N. V. Vijaya Kumar Raju under the banner Silver Screen Pictures.

It stars Hariish Dhanunjaya, Avanthika Hari Nalwa, and Athulya Chandra in the lead roles.

The film was theatrically released on 28 November 2025.

== Cast ==
- Hariish Dhanunjaya
- Avanthika Hari Nalwa
- Athulya Chandra

== Production ==
The film is written and directed by Chaitanya Varma Nadimpilli. It is produced by Giduturi Ramana Murthy and Rudraraju N. V. Vijaya Kumar Raju under the production banner Silver Screen Pictures.

== Reception ==
Times Now stated that although there is nothing new in the story, it was nonetheless impressive, and rated three out of five star. The film was also reviewed by Sakshi.
