= First Time (2026 film) =

- Directed by: Hemanth Ippalapalli
- Written by: Hemanth Ippalapalli
- Produced by: Hemanth Ippalapalli (Srinivas Ippalapalli)
- Starring: Saurabh Dhingra; Anicka Vikraman; Akhil Sarthak
- Cinematography: Venu Muralidhar and Ram
- Edited by: Hemanth Ippalapalli
- Music by: Sri Venkat and Suraj S Kurup
- Production company: Hemanth Arts
- Release date: 22 May 2026
- Country: India
- Language: Telugu

First Time is a 2026 Indian Telugu language science fiction film written and directed by Hemanth Ippalapalli. Hemanth is also the producer of the film and has produced it under the banner Hemanth Arts. The film stars Saurabh Dhingra, Akhil Sarthak, and Anicka Vikraman in the lead roles. The film also features the actors Sivakumar Ramachandravarapu, Mime Gopi, and Gayatri Gupta.

Music for the film is composed by Sri Venkat. The movie's cinematography is handled by Venu Muralidhar and Ram. The film's editing is handled by Hemanth Ippalapalli.

== Plot ==
The story begins nearly 300 years in the future, in 2304 AD. The movie starts with curious question about how the Kali Yuga has ended. The movie continues to show how it is shown to the aliens about how a sacred woman played a key role in creating and continuing the new life on Earth.

The movie's core drama begins by showing the main conflict faced by the heroine Anicka Vikraman, and continues to show how three men, Bhupal Raju, Shivakumar Ramachandravarapu, and Akhil Sarthak try to control and take possession of the young woman, Anicka Vikraman. The movie continues to show how Anicka tried to save herself from them, how she met the hero Saurabh Dhingra, and how the new world has come into existence.

== Cast ==
- Saurabh Dhingra
- Anicka Vikraman
- Akhil Sarthak
- Mime Gopi
- Bhupal Raju
- Gayatri Gupta
- Annapoornamma
- Ajay Ratnam

== Production ==
The trailer for the movie is released on 30 April 2026. The film's pre release event was held on 19 May 2026.

== Music ==
The film's music is composed by Sri Venkat.

No.	Title	Lyrics	Singer(s)	Length
1.	"Ee Pilla Nenu"	Hemanth Ippalapalli	Sai Charan and Harini Ivaturi	2:42
2.	"Yellipotha Vundhi"	Kiran	Swarag	2:56
Total length:				5:38

== Release ==
The film is released theatrically on 22 May 2026.

== Reception ==
Ramu Chinthakindhi of Telugu Times Now has given the movie 3 stars out of 5, and praised the acting of the lead actors. The reviewer stated that despite the low budget the movie did not compromise on high technical standards.

Suhas Sistu of The Hans India gave the movie 3/5 stars, and said that even though the first half scenes are slow-paced, the second half has rich visuals and good storytelling.

Lakshminarayana Varanasi of TV9 Telugu said that the music composed by Sri Venkat is okay, and that the background score composed by him is very good.

Chetupalli Sanjiv Kumar of Hindustan Times gave the 2.75/5 stars, and said that visual effects done by human intelligence is very good, but also said that the editing should have been better.
