= Bhaarat Today =

- Country: India
- Broadcast area: India; United States
- Headquarters: Hyderabad, Telangana

Programming
- Language: Telugu

Ownership
- Owner: Sahasra Television Private Limited
- Key people: B.Vijay Kumar; Valleeswar; RVV Krishna Rao

History
- Launched: 29 August 2015

Links
- Website: www.youtube.com/@BhaaratToday

Bhaarat Today is a 24-hour Telugu devotional and entertainment channel in India.

== Inauguration ==
Bhaarat Today is a Telugu language T V channel. It was inaugurated on 29 August 2015. The inauguration event was conducted at Shilpa Kalaa Vedika, Hyderabad, Telangana and was presided over by Swami Paripoornaananda Saraswati, founder of Sripeetham, a center for vedic learning. The channel logo was released by TV5 (India) Chairman B. R. Naidu. Nagarjuna Industry's Group Chairman K. V. K. Raju was felicitated in the event. The channel's editorial team consists of experienced media professionals, B. Vijay Kumar, Valleeswar and R. V. Krishna Rao.

== Channel ==
Bhaarat Today channel telecasts hourly news bulletins and newstrack shows backed up by news reporters spread out in the twin Telugu states of Andhra Pradesh and Telangana, covering events, films and the entertainment world. It also telecasts special documentaries on events, history, culture, films and entertainment.

== Online ==
Bhaarat Today Telugu News is streamed live online on YuppTV in North America.
