= Annadata =

Annadata (lit. 'food provider') may refer to these Indian films:

- Annadata (1952 film)
- Annadata (1954 film), a 1954 Telugu film directed by Vedantam Raghavaiah
- Annadata (1972 film), a 1972 Hindi film directed by Asit Sen
- Annadata (2002 film), a 2002 Bengali film directed by Ravi Kinagi

== See also ==
- Annadata (magazine), Indian agricultural magazine
