= Ramoji =

Ramoji may refer to

- Ramoji Film City film studio
- Ramoji Group Indian conglomerate founded by Ramoji Rao
- Ramoji Rao Indian businessman
