= Vemuri =

Vemuri (వేమూరి) is a Telugu surname. Notable people with the surname include:

- Vemuri Anjaneya Sarma (1917–2003), Indian writer
- Vemuri Gaggaiah (1895–1955), Indian actor
- Vemuri Krishna Rao (1767–1845), Deewan of Travancore
- Vemuri Radhakrishna, Indian media executive
