= V6 News =

V6 News వి6 న్యూస్
- Country: India
- Broadcast area: Telangana; Andhra Pradesh
- Headquarters: Hyderabad, Telangana

Programming
- Language: Telugu
- Picture format: 4:3 (576i, SDTV); 1080i (HDTV)

Ownership
- Owner: VIL Media Pvt. Ltd.
- Key people: Ankam Ravi (Founder, CEO & Editor in Chief) Gaddam Vaishnavi (Managing Director)

History
- Launched: 1 March 2012

Links
- Website: www.v6velugu.com//

V6 News is a Telugu news channel in the Indian state of Telangana, owned by VIL. It was launched in March 2012, and provides 24-hour news. It was founded by Ravi Ankam, who is its CEO and chief editor.

== History ==
V6 News Channel evolved during the Telangana statehood movement, addressing the need for comprehensive coverage of events about Telangana, and reflecting the state’s perspectives. Professor Padmaja Shaw, Department of Communication and Journalism, Osmania University, India, said in one of her articles how the Telangana perspective had limited representation prior to the launch of V6 channel and how the channel played a key role in spreading the Telangana viewpoint.

== Content ==
The channel telecasts news on politics and current affairs and focuses on reporting regional issues, local sentiments, and developments statewide. It has a reporting network in both Telugu states. It presents news, adhering to its motto, "News As It Is," and the standard of objectivity and fairness. Though it runs various programs, its flagship program, "Teenmaar Varthalu" (started on 1 Feb 2013), which presents news in the Telangana dialect, is widely recognized in the Telugu-speaking community and is later emulated by other Telugu News channels in the state too. The then Chief Minister K. Chandrasekhara Rao also mentioned V6 news channel's role in presenting and shaping up Telangana culture and its flagship program, Teenmar Varthalu. V6 News also produced various festival-related songs (Batukamma and Bonalu festivals) that depicted Telangana's cultural heritage and identity. It also gained recognition for initiatives, such as inviting a transgender for news reading in Telugu. The channel gradually grew in popularity and won the heart of Telangana people (Telangana Gunde Chappudu). Currently, the channel has millions of subscribers on platforms like YouTube, Facebook, and X.

V6 News also launched “Prabhata Velugu,” a Telugu newspaper on Oct 5, 2018.

== Awards ==
The channel has received several awards. Within nine months of its launch, it received national-level recognition bagging four National Television (NT) awards, given by Indian Television Pvt. Ltd and in its second year it received another seven NT awards.

It received a UNICEF award for children's programming.

Ravi Ankam, the founder of the channel, won the "Game Changer" award (2021) in recognition of his contribution to the South News Media.

== See also ==
- List of Telugu-language television channels
