= Vaartha =

Telugu newspaper

- Industry: Media
- Founded: 1 March 1996
- Headquarters: Hyderabad, India
- Key people: Girish Sanghi, Founder
- Website: www.vaartha.com

Vaartha is a Telugu newspaper headquartered in Hyderabad, India. Vaartha means "news" in Telugu.

== History ==
Vaartha was launched in 1996 with A.B.K Prasad as its first editor. It claimed to be the first Telugu daily in Telangana and Andhra Pradesh to use Information Technology, allowing it to publish news that broke at as late as 4 a.m. Vaartha was initially popular, competing with Eenadu and Udayam. It now has a smaller circulation than Eenadu, Sakshi or Andhra Jyothy. Vaartha is produced by A.G.A Publications, which is owned by Gireesh Kumar Sanghi's Hyderabad-based Sanghi Group.
