= Prime9 News =

- Country: India
- Broadcast area: India
- Headquarters: Hyderabad, India

Programming
- Language: Telugu language
- Picture format: 576i

Ownership
- Owner: Samhitha Broadcasting Pvt. Ltd
- Key people: P. Venkateswara Rao (CEO)

History
- Launched: October 2018
- Replaced by: Channel 36 (UP UK)

Links
- Website: Prime9 News

Prime9 News is an Indian Telugu language 24-hour television news channel. The channel is promoted by Samhitha Broadcasting Pvt. Ltd. Its head office is in Hyderabad. The channel launched in October 2018 with a test run.

== History ==
Prime9 News is an Indian satellite television news channel that provides 24-hour news coverage in Telugu. It launched with a test run using RTV license in October 2018.

== Programming ==
The channel coverage includes live news, news bulletins, current affairs, talk shows. It broadcasts regional, national and international news.

== Availability ==
It is available in Intelsat 17, 66.0°E 3876, horizontal with symbol rate - 14300 3/4, System DVB-S28PSKMPEG-4.

== See also ==
- List of Telugu-language television channels
