= ABN Andhra Jyothi =

Indian Telugu-language TV news channel

ABN Andhra Jyothy
- Country: India
- Network: Amoda Broadcasting Network
- Headquarters: Hyderabad, India

Programming
- Language: Telugu
- Picture format: 16:9 (576i, SDTV); 1080p or 720p (HDTV) (resolution varies depending on affiliate)

Ownership
- Owner: Vemuri Radhakrishna

History
- Launched: 15 October 2009; 16 years ago

Links
- Website: Andhra Jyothy

ABN Andhra Jyothy is an Indian Telugu-language 24-hour news channel launched on 15 October 2009. Aamoda Broadcasting Network is the holding company of the channel and is promoted by Vemuri Radhakrishna. The media house also owns the Telugu daily newspaper Andhra Jyothy.

== History ==
ABN Andhra Jyothy was launched as a Telugu-language news channel in October 2009. Aamoda Broadcasting Network which owns the Telugu daily newspaper Andhra Jyothi is the holding company of the channel. The channel has the tagline 'We Report, You Decide'.

== Ownership ==
As of April 2017, Aamoda Broadcasting Private Limited, the holding company of ABN Andhra Jyothy, held 87.39% of the shares and the promoter Vemuri Radhakrishna, a professional journalist, owned 9.19% of the shares.

== Notable work ==
The channel came to limelight by exposing the then Andhra Pradesh Governor N. D. Tiwari's sex scandal, leading to his resignation.

== Controversies ==
S. Janardhan, an advocate from Hyderabad, filed a petition in Ranga Reddy court seeking action against the misuse of funds by V. Radha Krishna, which were collected for the maintenance of Warangal-based conjoined twins Veena and Vani. By June 2015, nearly Rs 25 lakh had been collected for the twins. The court directed the Saroornagar police to register a case under Section 406, 420, 403 and 120(b) and submit a detailed report on the incident by 16 November.

== See also ==
- Andhra Jyothi
- List of Telugu-language television channels
