= ETV (Telugu) =

Indian Telugu-language TV channel

- Logo used since 1995
- Country: India
- Network: ETV Network
- Headquarters: Hyderabad, Telangana, India

Programming
- Language: Telugu
- Picture format: 1080i HDTV (downscaled to letterboxed 576i for the SDTV feed)

Ownership
- Owner: Ramoji Group
- Sister channels: ETV Plus; ETV Cinema; ETV Life; ETV Abhiruchi; ETV Andhra Pradesh; ETV Telangana; ETV Bal Bharat

History
- Launched: 27 August 1995; 31 years ago

Links
- Website: ETV Telugu; ETV Win

ETV is an Indian Telugu-language general entertainment pay television channel. The channel was launched on 27 August 1995 focusing on the state of Andhra Pradesh. It is a part of the ETV Network owned by Ramoji Group. It is the second-oldest Telugu satellite channel after Gemini TV. It is also one of the earliest private satellite channels in South India.

== Name ==
The letter E in ETV stands as a Telugu letter "ఈ" meaning "This" collectively meaning as "This TV". The letter E also stands as a short cut form of Eenadu, a Telugu newspaper owned by Ramoji Rao. Eenadu is a polysemic word which has two meanings in Telugu language — "this day" and "this land".

== History ==
=== Launch ===
ETV was launched on 27 August 1995 by Ramoji Group which owned Eenadu, the largest circulated Telugu-language daily newspaper. The company leased a high-quality transponder on the Intelsat satellite system, and uplinked from Padduka near Colombo, Sri Lanka. ETV began with an ambitious 18-hour service of entertainment and film-based programming.

Its initial programming included children's programmes like Sabash Tin-Tin, Baboi Dennis (the Telugu-dubbed versions of animated series The Adventures of Tintin and Dennis the Menace), film-based programmes like Cinema Quiz, Cinemasala, Hats Off (hosted by veteran film actor Nutan Prasad), Masterminds, a children's quiz, women-centric programmes like Vasundhara, Chitti Chitkalu, Ghuma Ghumalu etc.

=== Recent history ===
In February 2006, ETV Network had taken its two Telugu channels ETV and ETV2 to pay mode at a combined price of ₹10. However, its non-Telugu channels remained free-to-air (FTA).

It was reported in January 2014 that Network18 Group had bought 24.5 percent stake in the Telugu channels ETV and ETV2 along with acquiring 100 percent stake in the regional Hindi news channels of the ETV Network.

It also has a HD version which was launched on 29 July 2016 under the name ETV HD. The channel is the 3rd most watched Telugu language TV channel with an impression of 1228.2 AMA (average minute audience) during 10th week data of 6–12 March 2021 according to BARC ratings.

In February 2017, ETV entered into an exclusive partnership with over-the-top (OTT) content provider YuppTV in the United States. As part of the association, YuppTV users can access content from ETV Telugu, along with other ETV Network channels like ETV Life, ETV Plus, ETV Cinema, and ETV Abhiruchi in the US Market.

== Programming ==
Initially, ETV preferred creating in-house content as the parent company had experience in film production through Usha Kiran Movies banner and because Ramoji Group also owns Ramoji Film City, the largest film studio facility in the world. Later it also started encouraging outside producers to produce serials for the channel.

== Logos ==
Logo in 1995

Present logo

Present logo of ETV HD

== See also ==
- ETV Network
- Ramoji Group
- Eenadu
