= ETV Network =

Indian Telugu-language television network

- Country: India
- Headquarters: Hyderabad, Telangana, India

Programming
- Picture format: 576i (16:9 SDTV); 1080i (HDTV)

Ownership
- Owner: Ramoji Group

History
- Founded: 27 August 1995; 31 years ago
- Founder: Ramoji Rao

Links
- Website: etv.co.in

ETV Network is a network of Telugu language news and entertainment satellite television channels in India. It is based in Hyderabad, Telangana, India. It also had some non Telugu-language satellite television channels. All non-Telugu satellite television channels were acquired by Reliance Industries-owned TV18 for ₹2,053 crore in FY 2014–15 and later rebranded.

== History ==
=== Telugu language network ===
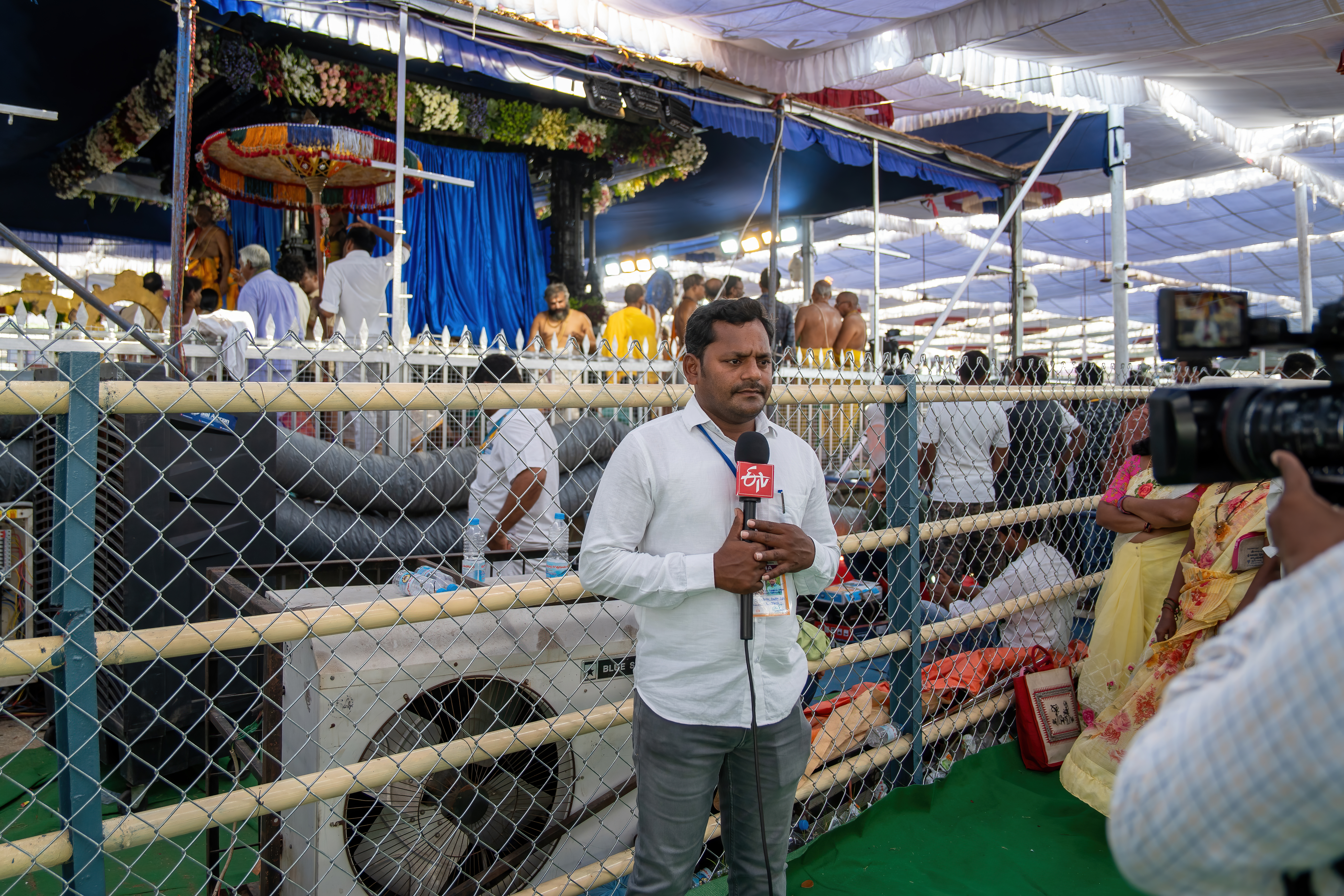
Reporter broadcasting live at Bhadrachalam

The Hyderabad daily newspaper Eenadu (Telugu for 'today') started its own Telugu language channel named Eenadu TV on 27 August 1995.

The flagship company ETPL launched four new television channels in November 2015 – namely ETV Life – a health and wellness channel, ETV Abhiruchi, a cookery channel, ETV Plus – an entertainment and reality channel, and ETV Cinema – a movie channel in Telugu language. In May 2014, ETV2 and ETV3 were renamed to ETV Andhra Pradesh and ETV Telangana respectively.

On 27 December 2018, the network launched ETV Plus HD, ETV Life HD, ETV Abhiruchi HD, and ETV Cinema HD.

=== Non-Telugu language TV assets ===
The network also added regional channels in other Indian languages and built a large local news network using ETV brand after success in the Telugu-speaking region. Ramoji Group sold its non Telugu language TV assets to TV18 in January 2014 with a permission to use ETV brand name.

In March 2015, TV18's Viacom18 decided to rebrand all five non-Telugu language ETV regional general entertainment channels. ETV Marathi, ETV Gujarati, ETV Kannada, ETV Bangla and ETV Odia were rebranded into Colors Marathi, Colors Gujarati, Colors Kannada, Colors Bangla and Colors Odia, respectively.

In March 2018, non-Telugu language TV assets of TV18 still using the ETV brand were rebranded as part of the News18 network.

In April 2016, ETV network added three more regional news channels catering to the audience of Kerala, Tamil Nadu, Assam and North East under the brand name of News18. The channels are named News18 Kerala, News18 Tamil Nadu and News18 Assam-NE.

== Owned channels ==
=== On air channels ===
Channel	Launched	Language	Genre	Video format
ETV	1995	Telugu	General entertainment	SD+HD
ETV Cinema	2015	Telugu	Movies	SD+HD
ETV Plus	2015	Telugu	Comedy	SD+HD
ETV Life	2015	Telugu	Devotional & health	SD
ETV Music	2026	Telugu	Music	SD
ETV Andhra Pradesh	2014	Telugu	News	SD
ETV Telangana	2014	Telugu	News	SD

=== Former channels ===
==== Telugu language channels ====
Channel	Launched	Rebranded	Language	Genre	Video format	Notes
ETV Life HD	2018	2020	Telugu	Health & well-being	HD	
ETV Abhiruchi HD	2018	2020	Telugu	Food & cookery	HD	
ETV2	2003	2014	Telugu	News	SD	Replaced with ETV Andhra Pradesh
ETV3	April 2014	May 2014	Telugu	News	SD	Replaced with ETV Telangana
ETV Abhiruchi	2015	2026	Telugu	Food & Lifestyle	SD	Replaced with ETV Music
ETV Bal Bharat	2021	2026	Hindi, English, Telugu, Kannada, Malayalam, Tamil, Hindi	Kids	SD	Replaced with ETV Sports Network

==== Non-Telugu language channels ====
Channel	Launched	Rebranded/defunct	Language	Genre	Video format	Notes
ETV Rajasthan	2000	2018	Hindi	News	SD	Acquired by Network18 and rebranded as News18 Rajasthan
ETV Uttar Pradesh Uttarakhand	2002	2018	Hindi	News	SD	Acquired by Network18 and rebranded as News18 Uttar Pradesh Uttarakhand
ETV Madhya Pradesh Chhattisgarh	2002	2018	Hindi	News	SD	Acquired by Network18 and rebranded as News18 Madhya Pradesh Chhattisgarh
ETV Bihar Jharkhand	2002	2018	Hindi	News	SD	Acquired by Network18 and rebranded as News18 Bihar-Jharkhand
ETV Haryana Himachal Pradesh	2014	2018	Hindi	News	SD	Acquired by Network18 and rebranded as News18 Punjab
ETV Urdu	2001	2018	Urdu	News	SD	Acquired by Network18 and rebranded as News18 Urdu
ETV Bangla	2000	2015	Bengali	General entertainment	SD	Acquired by Viacom18 and rebranded as Colors Bangla
ETV News Bangla	2014	2018	Bengali	News	SD	Acquired by Network18 and rebranded as News18 Bangla
ETV Gujarati	2002	2015	Gujarati	General entertainment	SD	Acquired by Viacom18 and rebranded as Colors Gujarati
ETV News Gujarati	2014	2018	Gujarati	News	SD	Acquired by Network18 and rebranded as News18 Gujarati
ETV Marathi	2000	2015	Marathi	General entertainment	SD	Acquired by Viacom18 and rebranded as Colors Marathi
ETV Odia	2002	2015	Odia	General entertainment	SD	Acquired by Viacom18 and rebranded as Colors Odia
ETV News Odia	2015	2018	Odia	News	SD	Acquired by Network18 and rebranded as News18 Odia
ETV Kannada	2000	2015	Kannada	General entertainment	SD	Acquired by Viacom18 and rebranded as Colors Kannada
ETV News Kannada	2014	2018	Kannada	News	SD	Acquired by Network18 and rebranded as News18 Kannada

== Streaming service ==
ETV Win is an over-the-top streaming service launched in November 2019. It has all the content from in-house production studios and television channels. In 2023, it has started producing and distributing original television shows and films under the label "ETV Win Originals".
