= Subhavaartha Television =

- Country: India
- Broadcast area: Worldwide
- Network: Goodnews Pvt. Ltd

Programming
- Language(s): Telugu
- Picture format: 576i SD; 1080i HD

Ownership
- Owner: Nehru Dhyriam (chairman)

History
- Launched: 2008
- Founder: Nehru Dhyriam

Links
- Website: www.subhavaarthatv.com

Subhavaartha Television is a Telugu Christian devotional channel launched in 2008 by Goodnews Pvt. Ltd. It is a leading Telugu devotional TV channel. It is available on cable, DTH and IPTV platforms in India, and can also be watched via iOS, BlackBerry and Android devices.

== Reach ==
The channel is available in many countries of Asia, Africa and Europe, and also in many island countries.

== See also ==
- List of Telugu-language television channels
