= Srini Raju =

Indian entrepreneur

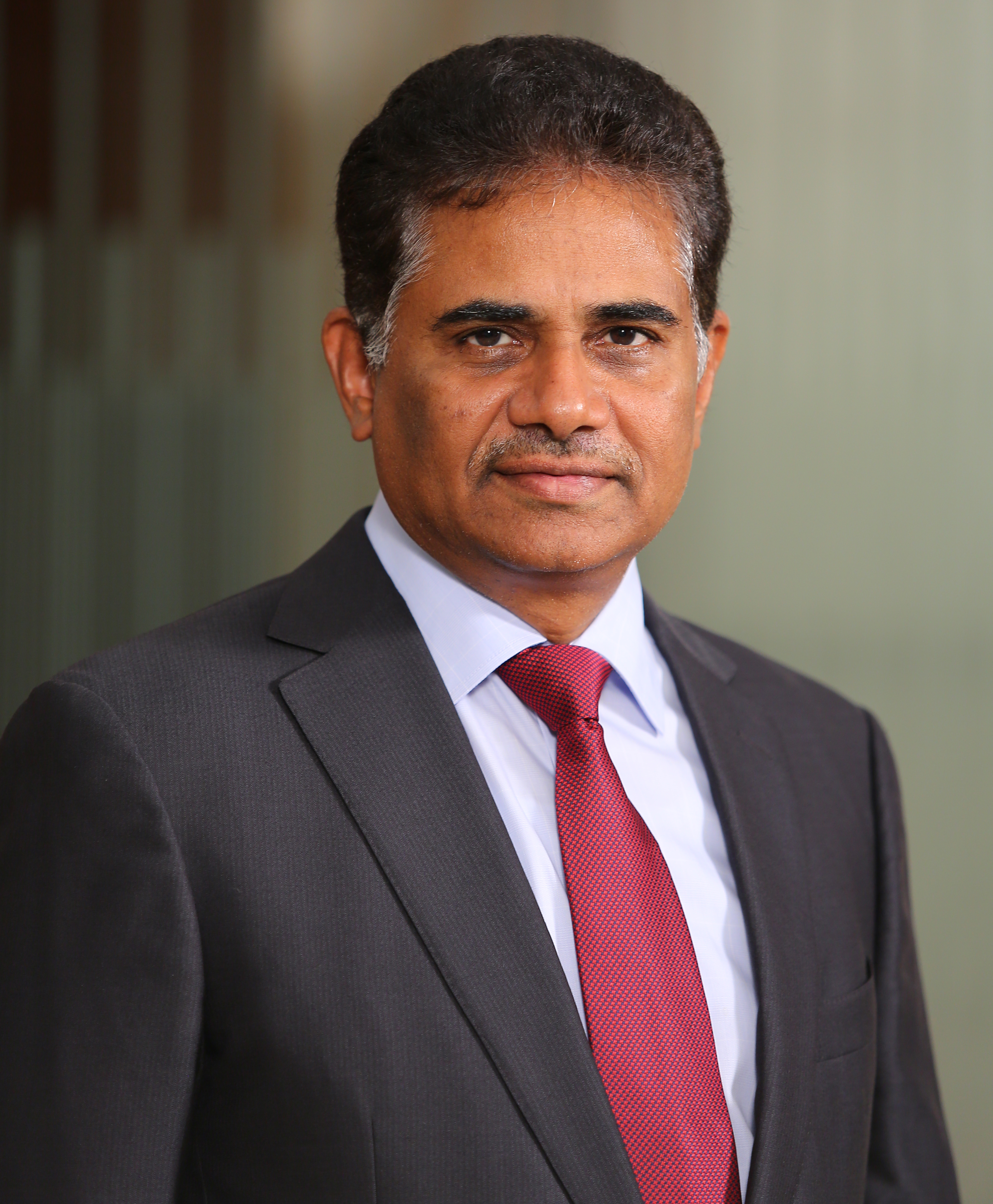
- Born: 1961 (age 64–65); Ramanagaram (Etikatta), Khajipalem, Andhra Pradesh, India
- Education: NIT Kurukshetra, Utah State University
- Occupations: Chairman, iLabs Group
- Spouse: Jyothi Raju Chintalapati
- Children: Kartheek Raju, Vaishnavi Raju

Chintalapati Srinivasa Raju, commonly known as Srini Raju, is an Indian entrepreneur and private equity investor. He was a Chief Operating Officer at Satyam Computer Services. He then became the founding Chief executive officer of Dun & Bradstreet Satyam Software (DBSS), a joint venture between Satyam Computer Services and Dun & Bradstreet, which later became Cognizant. Srini Raju co-founded iLabs Venture Capital Fund, which became iLabs Group, an investment group.

== Career ==
Srini Raju is an Indian entrepreneur and private equity investor. Throughout his career, he has been associated with Satyam Computer Services, Cognizant, and iLabs Group. Srini Raju also founded TV9 Media Group and Sri City; it was the first "Integrated Smart City" of its kind in India.[1]

== Early life and education ==
Srini Raju was born in 1961 in Khajipalem, Guntur district, Andhra Pradesh. Srini Raju earned a Bachelor of Engineering degree in civil engineering from the National Institute of Technology, Kurukshetra, in 1983. He received a master’s degree in civil and environmental engineering from Utah State University in 1986.

Srini Raju served as Chief Operating Officer at Satyam Computer Services and Chief Executive Officer at Satyam Enterprise Solutions. He was the founding CEO of Dun & Bradstreet Satyam Software, established in 1994, a joint venture with Dun & Bradstreet, which implemented IT projects for Dun & Bradstreet businesses. DBSS was later renamed Cognizant.

Raju left Satyam Computer Services in 2000. In the Satyam scandal in 2015, Ramalinga Raju, who was the former chairman of Satyam, and several others were convicted of accounting fraud related to the company. In 2018, the Supreme Court of India exonerated Srini Raju of insider trading and unlawful gains charges related to the scandal.

Srini later became the co-founder and chairman of iLabs Venture Capital Fund, a private equity (PE) firm based in Hyderabad. He invested in Sri City, which is a smart city in India, and the TV9 Telugu media group. Raju exited from TV9 in 2018. He has also worked on building educational institutions.

== Professional affiliations ==
In addition to investing in and mentoring young professionals and entrepreneurs, Srini Raju has been involved in developing higher-education institutions focused on Management and Technology.

- Industry Partner (Donor) & Member of Board of Governors of Indian Institute of Information Technology, Sri City. IIITS was established in 2013 under the Government of India's Initiative to set up 20 Institutes across India, focusing on Information Technology. The Institute was set up by the Government of India – MHRD, Government of Andhra Pradesh and Industry Partners represented by Sri City Foundation as a Not-for-Profit Public-Private-Partnership.
- Member of the Executive Board of Indian School of Business. Srini Raju pledged to donate ₹35 crores towards developing a Research Centre in the areas of Information Technology and Networked Economy. Indian School of Business (ISB) named the IT research center as Srini Raju Centre for Information Technology and Networked Economy (SRITNE) at ISB.
- Member of Governing Board and Governing Council; Founding Member of IIIT Hyderabad.
- Co-Sponsor (Donor) and Board Member of KREA University. Krea University is a unique effort, specifically conceived and designed to address the unprecedented challenges and opportunities of the 21st century.
- Member & Board Member of T-Hub, Hyderabad. T-Hub is a unique public/private partnership between the government of Telangana, 3 of India's premier academic institutes (IIIT-H, ISB & NALSAR) and key private sector leaders. It stands at the intersection of the start-up, academic, corporate, research and government sectors.
- Srini Raju is also a visiting Faculty at various universities like ISB, IIIT Hyderabad, IIT Madras, IESE Business School-University of Navarre etc.
- Srini Raju was also the member of the Steering Committee for conducting conferences by Confederation of Indian Industry (CII) jointly with Government of Andhra Pradeshduring IT Mega Event "GitexHyderabad 2003".
- Srini Raju is also an Advisory member of TIE Hyderabad. TIE Global is a nonprofit venture devoted to entrepreneurs in all industries, at all stages, from incubation, throughout the entrepreneurial lifecycle. With a global reach and a local focus, the heart of TiE efforts lies in its five foundational programs, – Mentoring, Networking, Education, Funding, and Incubation
- Srini Raju is an Advisory Board member of Hyderabad Angels. Established in 2012, HA investors are leading venture capitalists, entrepreneurs and business leaders, who, with their financial and business acumen, are committed to providing support to the Indian and global start-up ecosystem.
- Srini Raju serves as the Co-Chairperson of Young India Skills University (YISU), an institution established in Hyderabad under the Young India Skills University, Telangana (Public-Private Partnership) Act, 2024. The university aims to bridge the gap between industry requirements and academic programs by focusing on skill-based education aligned with evolving market demands.
