= Jai Maharashtra (TV channel) =

Indian Marathi-language TV news channel

- Country: India
- Headquarters: Mumbai, Maharashtra, India

Programming
- Language: Marathi
- Picture format: 576i (4:3) (SDTV)

Ownership
- Owner: Shri Sudhakar Shetty

History
- Launched: 1 May 2013 (Maharashtra Day)

Links
- Website: www.jaimaharashtranews.com

Jai Maharashtra is a 24/7 Marathi news channel launched on 1 May 2013. Shri Sudhakar Shetty owns the channel. Its broadcasting area is Maharashtra, India. This channel is available on the direct-to-home providers such as Tata Sky, Airtel,Dish TV, DD. This channel is available on Cable network like In Cable, Hathway, UCN, GTPL, Den Cable etc.

Jai Maharashtra was launched in 2013 and is owned by Shri Sudhakar Shetty under the parent company Sahana Films Pvt Ltd. Over the years, the network has featured several notable editors and television personalities, including Nilesh Khare, Tulsidas Bhoiyate, Prasad Khate, Ashish Jadhav and few others. Currently, Vrushali Kadam serves as the Editor of the channel.
