= Sakshi TV =

Indian Telugu-language TV news channel

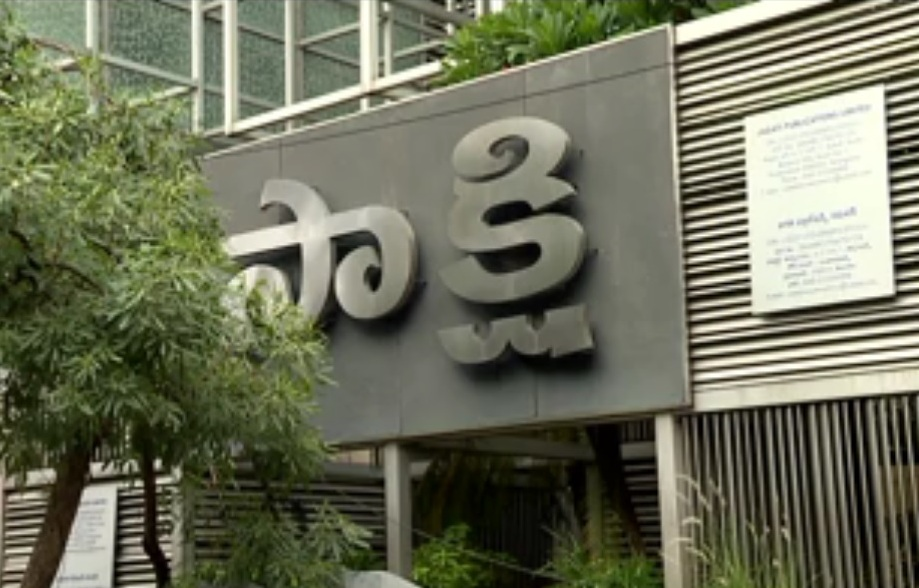
- Façade of Sakshi TV building
- Country: India
- Broadcast area: India
- Network: Sakshi Media Group
- Headquarters: Hyderabad, Telangana, India

Programming
- Language: Telugu
- Picture format: 4:3/16:9

Ownership
- Parent: Indira Television Ltd.
- Key people: Y. S. Bharathi Reddy (Chairperson)

History
- Launched: 1 March 2009 (17 years ago)
- Founder: Y. S. Jagan Mohan Reddy

Links
- Website: Sakshi.com

Sakshi TV (transl. The Witness) is an Indian Telugu-language 24-hour news channel. It was launched on 1 March 2009, by Indira Television Ltd. owned by Y. S. Jagan Mohan Reddy. It is currently run under the chairmanship of Y. S. Bharathi Reddy, wife of Jagan Mohan Reddy. The media group also owns the Telugu daily newspaper, Sakshi.

The channel is widely regarded as a propaganda outlet for Jagan Mohan Reddy and his political party—YSR Congress Party (YCP). It has been criticized for its biased coverage of the political rivals of Reddy and YCP. Sakshi TV has been found to be in breach of the News Broadcasting Standards Authority (NBSA) code of ethics on various occasions. On 20 January 2022, the Ministry of Home Affairs denied security clearance to the channel citing intelligence reports. As of February 2022, the channel is functional following a temporary stay it obtained from the Telangana High Court.

== History ==
The channel started airing on 1 March 2009. It is promoted by Indira Television Ltd., with Y. S. Jagan Mohan Reddy, son of then Chief Minister of Andhra Pradesh Y. S. Rajashekhara Reddy, as the Chairman. According to a CBI chargesheet filed against Jagan Mohan Reddy, the investments in his media companies were quid pro quo bribes by those people who had benefited from their unfair deals with his father's government.

The channel was initially named Indira Priyadarsini. According to Ramakrishna Reddy, the first Editor-in-Chief of the channel, it was renamed to cash in on the popularity of the Sakshi newspaper which was launched a year before the channel by Jagan Mohan Reddy. At its launch, the channel claimed to be the first HDTV channel in the country. It was marketed as being primarily targeted at the youth.

Of the nearly ₹40 crore (US$4.2 million) the government of Andhra Pradesh spent on advertising in electronic media for the years 2009-12, Sakshi TV got advertisements worth over ₹17 crore (US$1.8 million). This was attributed to the undue preferential treatment Sakshi TV and Sakshi newspaper received during the chief ministership of Rajasekhara Reddy.

It is currently run under the chairmanship of Y. S. Bharathi Reddy, wife of Jagan Mohan Reddy. In January 2019, Sakshi Media Group appointed Vinay Maheshwari as its Executive Director and CEO. Maheshwari exited the company in March 2022.

On 20 January 2022, the Indian Ministry of Home Affairs denied security clearance to Sakshi TV, along with a Malayalam channel MediaOne, based on intelligence inputs received from various central government agencies. The channel had filed a writ petition at Telangana High Court and, as of February 2022, it is surviving on a temporary stay until further hearing and another extension of the same on 8 August 2022.

== Content ==
Sakshi TV broadcasts regional, national, and international news. It also has programmes on restaurant reviews, automobiles, cookery and entertainment.

== Criticism ==
Sakshi TV is widely perceived as a propaganda outlet for Jagan Mohan Reddy. It has been criticized for its biased coverage of the political rivals of Reddy and his party YSR Congress Party. The channel has been found to be in breach of the News Broadcasting Standards Authority (NBSA) code of ethics on various occasions.

=== Y. S. Rajasekhara Reddy's death and conspiracy theory ===
In January 2010, Sakshi TV broadcast a conspiracy theory by the American journalist Mark Ames in the Russian online tabloid The eXile, on the death of Y. S. Rajasekhara Reddy, father of Jagan Mohan Reddy, in a helicopter crash on 2 September 2009. It alleged that Ambani brothers – Mukesh Ambani and Anil Ambani – of Reliance Group orchestrated the death. TV5 channel broke the story while Sakshi TV and NTV relayed the report aired by TV5.

The report led to massive attacks against the business establishments owned by the two Ambani brothers in Andhra Pradesh. On 8 January 2010, criminal cases were filed against Sakshi TV and NTV while two senior journalists of TV5 were arrested. Editors Guild of India asked the channels to desist from "irresponsible reporting" and condemned the reporting as sensational and against the principles of journalism.

== See also ==
- Sakshi (media group)
