= ETV Bal Bharat =

Indian children's television channel

- Logo used since 2021
- Country: India
- Broadcast area: India
- Network: ETV Network
- Headquarters: Hyderabad, Telangana, India

Programming
- Languages: Hindi, Telugu, Kannada, Malayalam, Tamil, Marathi, Gujarati, Odia, Assamese, Punjabi, Bengali
- Picture format: 1080i HDTV

Ownership
- Owner: Ramoji Group
- Sister channels: ETV; ETV Plus; ETV Cinema; ETV Andhra Pradesh; ETV Life; ETV Abhiruchi; ETV Telangana

History
- Launched: April 27, 2021; 5 years ago

Links
- Website: www.etvbalbharat.com

Availability

Streaming media
- Tata Play (India) sun direct (India): SD

ETV Bal Bharat is a children's pay television channel owned by the Hyderabad-based ETV Network airing animated programming. The network was launched on 27 April 2021, initially with channels in twelve distinct languages.

ETV Bal Bharat is the network's first television channel dedicated to children and is the only one to include audio tracks in multiple languages, including eleven Indian ones and even English. However, it was announced that the Tamil, Punjabi, Odia, Gujarati, Marathi, Bengali, and Assamese regional channels of Bal Bharat would cease operations by 1 April 2022, leaving their audio feeds to remain with the other six languages on the main channel. As of 2026, the channels broadcast in eleven languages.

== See also ==
- ETV Network
- Ramoji Group
- Eenadu
