= T News =

Telugu-language TV channel in India

- Country: India
- Headquarters: Hyderabad, Telangana, India

Programming
- Language: Telugu

History
- Launched: April 2011

Links
- Website: tnewstelugu.com

T News is a Telugu-language news television channel in the Indian state of Telangana. The channel is owned by TRS party. The channel focuses exclusively on news, events, and culture of Telangana. Its slogan is Telangana Gunde Chappudu, meaning The pulse of Telangana. The channel also has Urdu news bulletins in some evening slots.

T New is based in Hyderabad, Telangana. It offers breaking news, live reports, exclusive interviews, political debates, sports, weather, entertainment, business updates, and current affairs.

== T News programs ==
- Aadab Telangana
- Bhakthi Margalu
- Bollywood Talkies
- Chenu Chelaka
- Filmi Duniya
- Good Afternoon
- Good Evening
- Good Morning
- Health Plus
- Journey
- Maya Bazar
- Namasthe Telangana
- News Tonight
- Open
- Singareni Sravanthi
- Singidi
- Study Guide
- Telangana 360
- Trendz
- Power of Numerology
- Vaarthalu Live
- Vaidyam Arogyam Live
- Vishwaroopam
- Weekend Dhoom Dham
- Weekend Singidi

== Availability ==
This channel is telecast through Telangana Cable TV Networks, Tata Sky, Videocon d2h, Reliance Digital TV, Airtel digital TV, Dish TV and Sun Direct. The channel's live video feed is also streamed on its website and YouTube.

== History ==
The channel was previously associated with Raj News. T News was launched on 4 April 2011 (Ugadi day) after receiving permission to operate as an independent TV channel.
