= Gireesh Kumar Sanghi =

Gireesh Kumar Sanghi (born 8 March 1955) is an industrialist and politician. He was a Member of the Parliament of India for the Indian National Congress party representing Andhra Pradesh in the Rajya Sabha, the upper house of Parliament.

Sanghi completed a BA (political science) at Osmania University. He was elected to the Rajya Sabha in June 2004 and served until June 2010, actively involved in several committees. In February 2015 he left the Congress party and joined the BJP.

He is a joint-owner and director of a conglomerate of companies that includes Sanghi Textiles and A.G.A. Publications, the publisher of Telugu-language newspaper Vaartha and Hindi Swatantra Vaartha.

A controversy arose in 2016 about Sanghi's unauthorised use of a government bungalow. Sanghi was entitled to rent and use the bungalow while a member of the Rajya Sabha. However, upon ceasing to serve, he forfeited that right. However he continued to use the bungalow for over 5 years after his departure. Additionally, he failed to pay the rent due, leaving him liable for roughly ₹23,00,000. There were also complaints that he had made significant unauthorised changes to the government-owned bungalows, such as converting it into a two floor accommodation.
