= MOJO TV =

Indian Telugu-language news network

- Country: India
- Headquarters: Hyderabad, Telangana, India

Programming
- Language: Telugu

Ownership
- Owner: Media NxT India Pvt. Ltd.

History
- Launched: 1 June 2016

Links
- Website: mojotv.com

MOJO TV is an Indian satellite news network in Telugu language owned by Media NXT India Private Limited founded on 2016

== History ==
MOJO TV with a tagline of! (Prasniddam...Poradudam!), literally translating as 'to Question & to fight' launched on AIR from 1 May 2018.

It is a free to air channel available for downlink on Intelsat 20 68.5o E, Downlink frequency 3732.5 MHz, Symbol rate - 7.2 msps, FEC ¾, modulation - 8 PSK MPEG4, polarization (RX) - Vertical, service ID - 8, Video PID - 208 & Audio PID - 308.

== Programming ==
The channel airs shows like Mojo Masti, Tech 360, Super Prime Time with Raghu, Spotlight, Line of Fire, MOJO Trends, and The Real Politics.
