= Annadata (magazine) =

Indian agricultural magazine

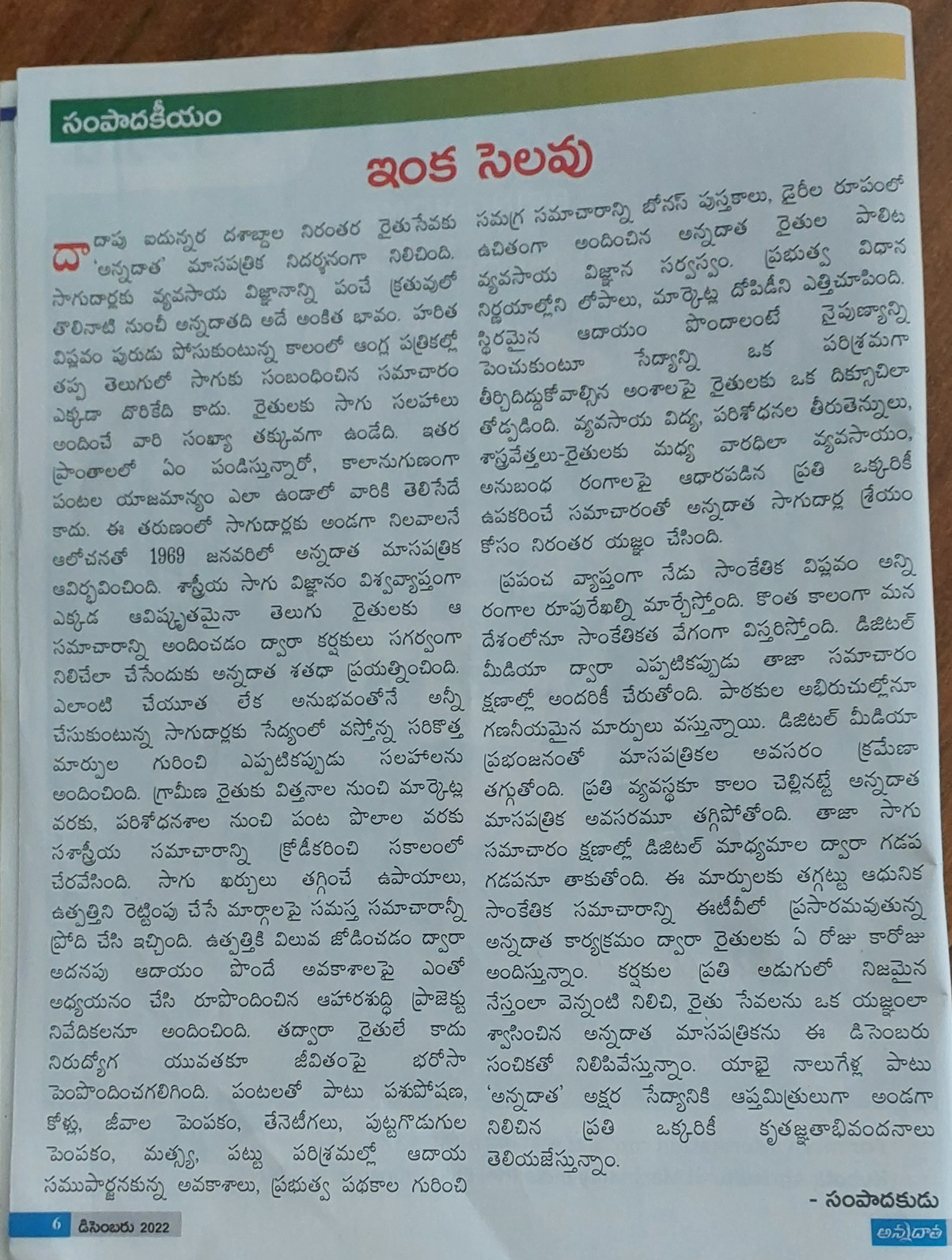
Page from Annadata, December 2022

Annadata is an Indian farmers and agriculture magazine published in Telugu language monthly. As of 2019, It is the highest circulated magazine in India with the circulation of 345,000.

== History ==
It was started by Ramoji Rao in 1969 and currently run under the Eenadu Newspaper.

The editorial team has announced that Annadata, which has been published for the past 55 years, will stop publication with the December 2022 issue.
