= Vemuri Radhakrishna =

Managing director of ABN Andhra Jyothi

Vemuri Radhakrishna is the managing director of ABN Andhra Jyothi. Radhakrishna took over Andhra Jyoti from the prior owner, K.L.N. Prasad, and launched it on 15 October 2002. He is known for his talk show, Open Heart with RK (OHRK) on ABN Andhra Jyothi.

In 2021, after a change of government, a few cases were filed against Radhakrishna by the government of Andhra Pradesh, but there was no persuasion in these cases.

After the bifurcation of Andhra Pradesh in 2014, the government of Telangana stopped his channel for a time. Radhakrishna took legal action against the Telangana government for banning his channel. He took the matter to both the High Court and the Supreme Court. After a few months, the Telangana Government ended the ban on the ABN channel. Both sides agreed to make up, and the Telangana Government started to give ads to the ABN Group again.
