= Mario García (designer) =

American journalist

Mario Garcia
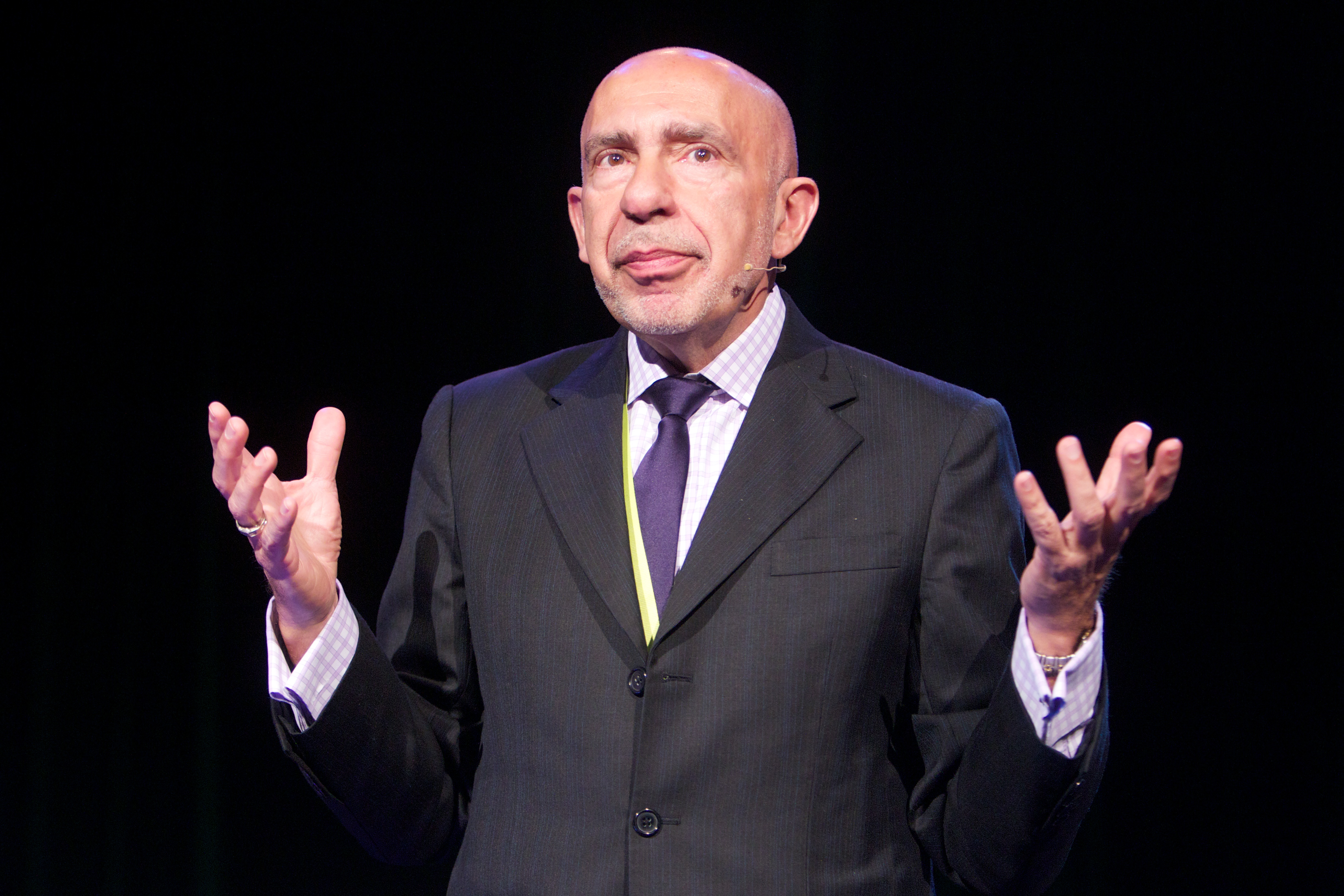
- Mario Garcia, 2011
- Born: February 15, 1947 (age 79); Placetas, Las Villas, Cuba
- Occupations: Designer; media consultant; author; university professor; keynote speaker
- Spouse: Maria Nobo Garcia (d. 2008)
- Children: Mario (1970); Brian (1971); Ana (1974); Elena (1976)

Mario R. García (born February 15, 1947, in Placetas, Las Villas, Cuba) is a Cuban-American newspaper and magazine designer and media consultant. He arrived from Cuba to the United States on Feb. 28, 1962, as one of the so-called Pedro Pans (14000 refugee children who arrived in the US soon after the Castro Revolution). He is senior adviser on news design/adjunct professor at Columbia University, School of Journalism. He was named the Hearst Digital Media Professional-in-Residence for 2013–14 there.

== Career ==
Garcia collaborated with more than 700 publications. He redesigned large publications such as The Wall Street Journal, Miami Herald, The Washington Post, Norway's Aftenposten, UAE's Gulf News, The Philadelphia Inquirer, Handelsblatt, Die Zeit, The Hindu, Malayala Manorama, Sakshi, and Paris Match; medium-size newspapers, such as The Charlotte Observer, România Liberă, and the 40 business weeklies of American City Business Journals; and smaller newspapers, such as the Lawrence Journal-World.

He was appointed the head of Syracuse University's School of Graphic Arts in 1977. García was the first recipient of the Society for News Design's Lifetime Achievement Award. In 2006 People en Español chose him as one of the 100 most influential Hispanics. In October 2011 he was awarded the Missouri Honor Medal for Distinguished Service in Journalism by the Missouri School of Journalism.

In September 2012, García published his thirteenth book, and first e-book, iPad Design Lab: Storytelling in the Age of the Tablet.

He is the author of The Story, is a trilogy about mobile storytelling: Transformation, Storytelling, Design. There is a Spanish edition of The Story.

His latest books are titled Consulting with Heart (2025) and AI: The Next Revolution for Content Creation (2024).

== Works ==
Columbia Journalism School faculty bio for Dr. Mario Garcia

=== Recent writings ===
Mario Garcia's latest book, is Consulting with Heart (2025), a combination memoir and guide for aspiring consultants; also AI: The Next Revolution for Content Creation (2024), and The Story, a trilogy, a guide to mobile/digital storytelling. The three volumes include Transformation, Storytelling and Design. All are available from amazon.com

==== Visual Storytelling ====
- "The role of WED in creating a rich palette of visual storytelling for mobile | García Media". García Media.
- "Digital storytelling, Part One: The fusion of writing/editing/design | García Media". García Media.
- "Digital storytelling, Part Two: A linear fusion of narrative, imagery | García Media". García Media.
- "Visual storytelling innovation: key to progress in 2017 | García Media". García Media.
- "Mobile storytelling: fast, furious and simple | García Media". García Media.

==== Briefings and email newsletters ====
- "Those email newsletters (or briefings) gain importance | García Media". García Media.

==== Sponsored ad/native advertising ====
- "The promising new frontier (Part One) | García Media". García Media.
- "Who produces it? (Part Two) | García Media". García Media.
- "How much to charge (Part Four) | García Media". García Media.
- "Getting started (Part Five) | García Media". García Media.
