= K. L. N. Prasad =

Indian politician

Member of Parliament, Rajya Sabha
- In office April 03, 1970 – July 16, 1987
- Constituency: Andhra Pradesh

Personal details
- Born: 1 January 1928
- Died: 27 July 1987 (aged 59)
- Party: Indian National Congress
- Spouse: Prabhavati
- Children: 7

K. L. N. Prasad (1928–1987) was an Indian politician. He was a Member of Parliament representing Andhra Pradesh in the Rajya Sabha the upper house of India's Parliament as member of the Indian National Congress.
