= DD Yadagiri =

Indian public Telugu-language television channel

Doordarshan Yadagiri
- Country: India
- Broadcast area: Around Asia
- Headquarters: Hyderabad, Telangana, India

Programming
- Picture format: 1080i HDTV

Ownership
- Owner: Prasar Bharati

History
- Launched: 2014
- Former names: Doordarshan Kendra Hyderabad (1977–2014)

Links
- Website: Official Website

DD Yadagiri is a state-owned Telugu language television channel operated by India's national broadcaster Doordarshan. It is one of the 11 Indian language channels operated by Doordarshan and is telecast from Doordarshan Kendra, Hyderabad and caters the state of Telangana. The channel is named for Sri Lakshmi Narasimha Swamy Temple of Yadagirigutta in the state. It was launched in 2014 following the bifurcation of Andhra Pradesh and the formation of the new Telangana state.

== History of Kendra ==
Hyderabad's Doordarshan Kendra has transformed from the initial setup of Television Base Production Centre during 1974. It was inaugurated by the then President of India, N. Sanjeeva Reddy on 23 October 1977. The service has been extended to the entire state in phased manner by installing Terrestrial Transmitters of different capacities (HPTs, LPTs, VLPTs) in different parts of the state. Hyderabad programmes were beamed through satellite and Cable Networks. Doordarshan Kendra Hyderabad's Regional Network in Telugu took on a new identity of DD Saptagiri, on 2 April 2003.

After bifurcation of Andhra Pradesh state, the DD Saptagiri was relegated to being telecast from Doordarshan Kendra Vijayawada for Andhra Pradesh while the existing network, named DD Yadagiri, was aimed at the Telangana populace. DD Yadagiri's operations have been continued from its current Ramanthapur office, Hyderabad. The channel highlights the Telangana culture, and dialect.

== Frequency & satellite details ==
INSAT-3A (C-BAND) 93.5E 3840 MHz VERTICAL 4250, INSAT-4B (KU) 93.5E 11150 V 27500

== See also ==
- All India Radio
- DD Free Dish
- List of programs broadcast by DD National
- List of South Asian television channels by country
- Prasar Bharati
