= DD Saptagiri =

Indian Telugu-language public TV channel

Doordarshan Saptagiri దూరదర్శన్ సప్తగిరి
- Type: Broadcast television network
- Country: India
- Availability: India and parts of Asia, China and Gulf Countries.
- Headquarters: Vijayawada, Andhra Pradesh, India
- Owner: Prasar Bharati
- Launch date: 10 October 1993 (as Doordarshan Kendra Hyderabad); 27 September 2004 (as Doordarshan Kendra Vijayawada)

DD Saptagiri, previously known as DD-8, is state-owned Indian television channel operated by Doordarshan, catering to Telugu-speaking audiences in Andhra Pradesh. Originally launched in 1993 as DD-8, the channel was renamed in 2003 after the Saptagiri hills, a cultural landmark associated with the Tirumala Venkateswara Temple in Tirupati. Following the bifurcation of Andhra Pradesh in 2014, DD Saptagiri relocated its operations from Hyderabad to Vijayawada to serve the newly formed Andhra Pradesh, while a separate channel, DD Yadagiri, was introduced for Telangana audiences. DD Saptagiri was formally relaunched from Vijayawada on 27 September 2014.

The channel provides a mix of news, cultural programs, and regional entertainment, targeting the 26 districts of Andhra Pradesh. Available through terrestrial transmission, direct-to-home (DTH) satellite, and cable networks, DD Saptagiri ensures wide accessibility across India and select international locations. It broadcasts via the INSAT-4B satellite and is also accessible on the Andhra Pradesh State FiberNet Limited (APSFL) network.

== History ==
The channel was originally launched on 10 October 1993 as DD-8 to cater to Telugu-speaking audiences. On 2 April 2003, it was renamed DD Saptagiri, (Note: In 1993–94, Doordarshan introduced several channels to cater to Indian regional languages, initially numbered from 1 to 18. These channels were renamed over the years, with most adopting the name of the language they served. However, some channels, such as DD Podhigai, DD Saptagiri, DD Sahyadri, and DD Girnar, were named after prominent hill ranges in the respective states, while DD Chandana was named after sandalwood, a notable product of Karnataka.) drawing its name from the Saptagiri hills, a significant cultural landmark in Andhra Pradesh associated with the Tirumala Venkateswara Temple in Tirupati. The name is derived from the Sanskrit words "Sapta" (seven) and "Giri" (hill), symbolizing the temple's seven surrounding hills.

Prior to the bifurcation of Andhra Pradesh in 2014, the channel operated from Hyderabad. Following the creation of Telangana, DD Saptagiri shifted its base to Vijayawada to serve the newly formed Andhra Pradesh, while a new channel, DD Yadagiri, was launched to cater to audiences in Telangana.

Doordarshan Vijayawada, the studio facility associated with DD Saptagiri, had been producing regional content since the 1990s. These programs primarily focused on Coastal Andhra and were previously aired weekly through Doordarshan Kendra Hyderabad.

The formal relaunch of DD Saptagiri from Vijayawada on 27 September 2014 was marked by an event attended by then Chief Minister of Andhra Pradesh, N. Chandrababu Naidu and Union Minister of Urban Development, M. Venkaiah Naidu. During the event, Venkaiah Naidu announced the naming of the All India Radio Bhavan in Vijayawada as Pingali Venkayya Bhavan in honor of Pingali Venkayya, the designer of the Indian national flag.

== Programming and reach ==
DD Saptagiri's programming primarily targets the 26 districts of Andhra Pradesh. The channel broadcasts through terrestrial over-the-air transmission as well as via direct-to-home (DTH) satellite and cable networks, ensuring access across India and some international locations. The channel's content includes news, cultural programs, and regional entertainment.

== Transmission and availability ==
The channel is accessible on various platforms:

=== Satellite Frequency Details ===
- G SAT-15 (C-BAND): 93.5°E, Frequency: 4060 MHz (Horizontal), Symbol Rate: 4250
- G SAT-15 (KU-BAND): 93.5°E, Frequency: 11150 MHz (Vertical), Symbol Rate: 27500

=== APSFL (Andhra Pradesh State FiberNet Limited) ===
- Channel Number: 064

== See also ==
- All India Radio
- DD Direct Plus
- Ministry of Information and Broadcasting
- List of programs broadcast by DD National
- List of South Asian television channels by country
