= TV9 Telugu =

24-hour Telugu news channel

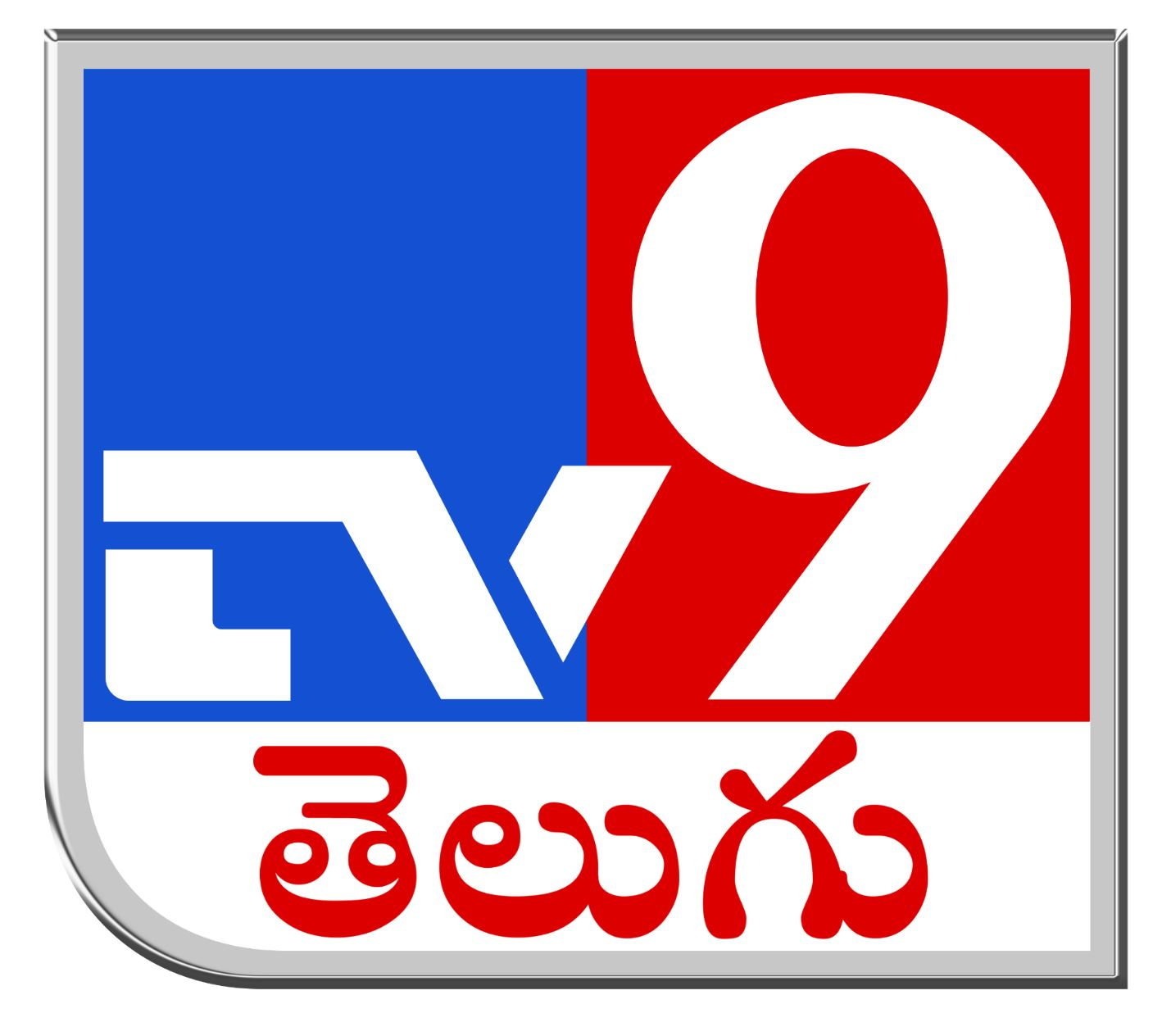
- Country: India
- Network: TV9 Network
- Headquarters: Hyderabad, Telangana, India

Programming
- Language: Telugu

Ownership
- Owner: My Home Group, Megha Engineering & Infrastructure Limited (MEIL)
- Parent: Associated Broadcasting Company Pvt Ltd
- Key people: Rajinikanth Vellalacheruvu (Managing Editor)
- Sister channels: TV9 Bangla; TV9 Kannada; TV9 Gujarati; TV9 Marathi; TV9 Bharatvarsh

History
- Launched: 1 February 2004 (22 years ago)
- Founder: Ravi Prakash; Srini Raju

Links
- Website: tv9telugu.com tv9.com

TV9 Telugu (formerly TV9) is an Indian Telugu-language 24-hour news channel focusing on the states of Andhra Pradesh and Telangana. It formally launched on 1 February 2004 with a 15-day trial run before the formal launch. It is headquartered in Hyderabad. Along with its rival ETV2 (now ETV Andhra Pradesh), it is the oldest 24-hour news channel in Telugu.

The founding CEO was Ravi Prakash who served in the role till May 2019. The channel was founded with seed capital from serial entrepreneur Srini Raju's iLabs Ventures. Srini Raju exited the company in August 2018 by selling his 80% stake to a group of investors including promoters of My Home Group and Megha Engineering & Infrastructure Limited (MEIL).

Rajinikanth Vellalacheruvu is the current Managing Editor of the channel.

== History ==
TV9 was launched as a 24-hour news channel in Telugu with its headquarters in Hyderabad. It formally launched on 1 February 2004 with a 15-day trial run before the formal launch. It is promoted by Associated Broadcasting Company Pvt. Ltd (ABCL). ABCL was backed by serial investor Srini Raju's iLabs Ventures with seed capital. It was reported that TV9 received ₹15 crore funding from Srini Raju's iLabs and Chennai-based Unify Wealth Management.

The founding CEO Ravi Prakash mentioned that they launched TV9 as a news channel targeting the youth and women. By June 2014, TV9 had 125 reporters across India. The 2004 Andhra Pradesh Assembly elections and the Indian general elections helped TV9 and its rival ETV2 to become established in the market.

As of December 2011, Srini Raju's iLabs and other investors held 80 percent stake in ABCL, while CEO Ravi Prakash and other management team held 20 percent stake. In September 2016, it was reported that Zee Group would likely buy a majority stake in ABCL.

=== TV9 Network ===
Over a period of time, the parent company launched news channels in other Indian languages. Its sister channels include TV9 Kannada (in the state of Karnataka), TV9 Marathi (in the state of Maharashtra), TV9 Gujarati (in the state of Gujarat), TV9 Bharatvarsh (Hindi news channel), TV9 Bangla (in the state of West Bengal). After the launch of other language channels, TV9 was renamed as TV9 Telugu.

Channel	Language	Year
TV9 Telugu	Telugu	2004
TV9 Kannada	Kannada	2006
TV9 Gujarati	Gujarati	2007
TV9 Marathi	Marathi	2011
TV9 Bharatvarsh	Hindi	2019
TV9 Bangla	Bangla	2021
TV9 MP CG	Hindi	2024
TV9 Tamil	Tamil	Coming Soon

=== Change of ownership ===
In August 2018, a group of investors including promoters of ALANDA media picked up the nearly 80% stake held by Srini Raju in Associated Broadcasting Company Ltd (ABCL) which owns TV9 Telugu and its sister channels. From 2004 till 2018, the investor had pumped in close to ₹2000 crore in tranches into the company. The company was valued at ₹9000 crore for the transaction. It marked the exit of Srini Raju from the company.

In April 2019, Srini Raju agreed to pay ₹650 crore to SAIF Partners (now Elevation Capital), who were also the investors in the company (ABCL). It was also reported that film actor Sivaji who had previously bought around 9% of ABCL from founder CEO Ravi Prakash had raised objections to the sale of 80% equity to My Home Group and Megha Engineering & Infrastructure Limited (MEIL).

=== Ouster of Ravi Prakash ===
Ravi Prakash served as its CEO from founding till May 2019 when he was sacked due to accusations of forgery. Ravi Prakash later alleged that after the company's takeover its editorial and operational independence had been compromised. He also noted that he was kept in the dark about the involvement of Jupally Rameswar Rao of My Home Group among the investor group, to whom he would have never sold his company to. Ravi Prakash alleged that the closeness of Rameswar Rao to Telangana Chief Minister K. Chandrasekhar Rao and Andhra Pradesh Chief Minister Y.S. Jagan Mohan Reddy has eroded the unbiasedness of TV9 and that the channel is now being used to further the agenda of Telangana Rashtra Samiti government and Chandrasekhar Rao.
