= Sakshi (newspaper) =

Telgu language newspaper in india

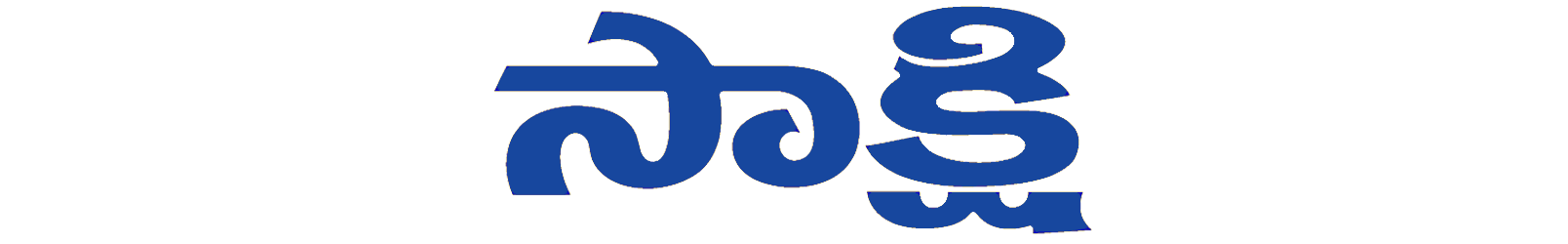

- Front page of Sakshi newspaper, 5 June 2024
- Type: Daily newspaper
- Format: Broadsheet
- Owner: Y. S. Bharathi Reddy (Chairperson)
- Founder: Y. S. Jagan Mohan Reddy
- Publisher: Jagati publications Ltd.
- Editor: R. Dhananjaya Reddy
- Founded: 23 March 2008 (18 years ago)
- Language: Telugu
- Headquarters: Hyderabad, India
- Circulation: 751,128 (as of 2025)
- Website: sakshi.com

Sakshi (Telugu: సాక్షి, transl. The Witness) is an Indian Telugu language daily newspaper sold mostly in the states of Andhra Pradesh and Telangana. It was launched on 23 March 2008 by Jagati Publications Ltd. owned by Y. S. Jagan Mohan Reddy.

Sakshi is widely regarded as a propaganda outlet for Jagan Mohan Reddy and his political party—YSR Congress Party (YCP). It is frequently criticized for its biased coverage of the political rivals of Reddy and YCP.

The newspaper is a part of Sakshi media group which also owns the Telugu news channel, Sakshi TV. It is currently run under the chairmanship of Y. S. Bharathi Reddy, wife of Jagan Mohan Reddy. As of 2023, it ranks second in circulation among Telugu daily newspapers behind its rival Eenadu.

== History ==
Sakshi is founded by Y. S. Jagan Mohan Reddy, the son of then Chief Minister of Andhra Pradesh Y. S. Rajasekhar Reddy. According to a CBI chargesheet filed against Jagan Mohan Reddy, the investments in Sakshi newspaper and Sakshi TV were quid pro quo bribes by those people who had benefited from their unfair deals with his father's government.

Sakshi launched on 23 March 2008 with 23 editions — nineteen editions from Andhra Pradesh, and four from New Delhi, Mumbai, Bangalore, and Chennai. At a price of ₹60 per month, Sakshi was marketed as a less expensive alternative to all other prominent Telugu dailies at the time which were priced at ₹96–100 per month. To stand out from its competition, Sakshi adopted high-quality production values. It had 30-pages, all of them in colour broadsheet format. The paper's layouts were designed by Mario Garcia.

Sakshi began with 23 editions published simultaneously — nineteen editions from Andhra Pradesh, and four from New Delhi, Mumbai, Bangalore, and Chennai. It was the first Telugu daily to publish all of its pages in colour for all editions.

Of the total Andhra Pradesh Government budget of about ₹200 crore for print media commercials for the years 2008-11, Sakshi newspaper was allotted over 50% amounting to ₹101.63 crore. This was attributed to the undue preferential treatment Sakshi newspaper and Sakshi TV received during the chief ministership of Y. S. Rajasekhara Reddy.

It is currently run under the chairmanship of Y. S. Bharathi Reddy, wife of Jagan Mohan Reddy.

== Content ==
Sakshi began with a focus on sports, education and business news that were underserved by existing dailies, as per its market survey done six months prior to the launch. It devoted two pages for sports coverage when competitors only had one page or less. It also experimented with a four page business news pullout in 2009.

== Circulation ==
From July to December 2019, Sakshi had an average daily circulation of 10.64 lakh. It ranks second in circulation among Telugu daily newspapers behind Eenadu and tenth in India across languages. For the period of 1H 2022, the circulation was reduced to 951,292, a reduction of 9.1% over two years.

== Criticism ==
The newspaper is widely perceived as a propaganda outlet for Jagan Mohan Reddy and his party YSR Congress Party (YCP). It is frequently criticized for its biased coverage of the political rivals of Reddy and YCP.

The paper, along with its sister outlet Sakshi TV, is part of a recent trend wherein businesspersons-turned-politicians across India launched their own media organisations to influence public opinion to further their political interests.
