= News18 Marathi =

Marathi-language news channel based in Mumbai, Maharashtra, India

- Logo used until January 15 2026
- Country: India
- Headquarters: Mumbai, Maharashtra, India

Programming
- Language: Marathi
- Picture format: 16:9 (576i, SDTV)

Ownership
- Owner: Network18 Group
- Sister channels: Network18 Group channels

History
- Launched: 6 April 2008; 18 years ago
- Former names: News18 Lokmat, IBN Lokmat

Links
- Website: lokmat.news18.com

Availability

Streaming media
- Live Stream: Watch Live

News18 Marathi, formerly known as News18 Lokmat, is a 24-hour Marathi-language news channel based in Mumbai, Maharashtra, India. It is a joint venture between Network18 Group and Lokmat Group the publisher of the newspaper Lokmat.

The channel was launched as IBN Lokmat on 6 April 2008, the day of the Hindu New Year festival Gudi Padwa. It was branded as News 18 Lokmat from 6 November 2017.

== Rebranding ==
News18 Lokmat was rebranded as News18 Marathi on 10 January 2026.
