= News18 Rajasthan =

Indian Hindi-language television news channel

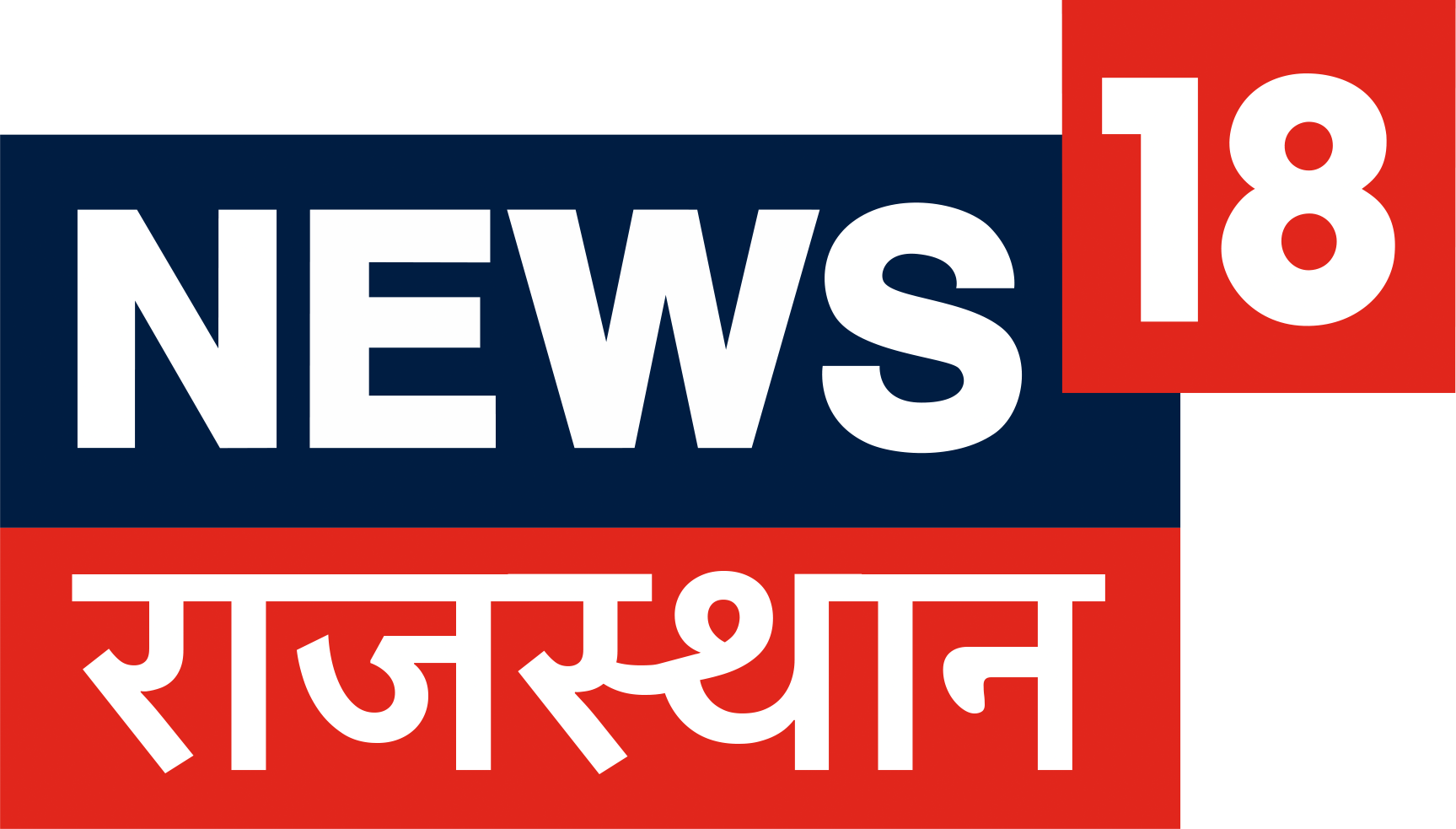
- Logo used since 2018
- Country: India
- Broadcast area: India
- Network: Broadcast television and online
- Headquarters: Jaipur, Rajasthan, India

Programming
- Languages: Hindi, Rajasthani
- Picture format: 16:9 (576i, SDTV)

Ownership
- Owner: Network18 Group
- Sister channels: Network18 Group channels

History
- Launched: 27 January 2002; 24 years ago
- Former names: ETV Rajasthan

Links
- Website: Rajasthan News

Availability

Streaming media
- Live Streaming: Watch Live

News18 Rajasthan is a 24-hour Indian Hindi-language news channel based in Rajasthan, India. It is owned by Network18 Group.

== See also ==
- Network18 Group
- CNN-News18
