= News18 Urdu =

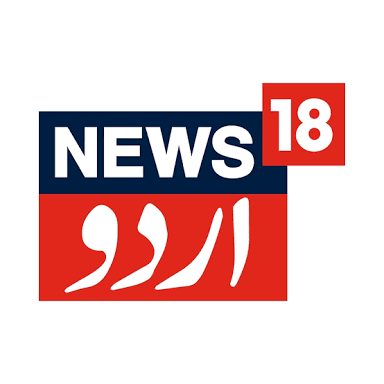
- Logo used since 2018
- Country: India
- Headquarters: Hyderabad, Telangana, India

Programming
- Language: Urdu
- Picture format: 4:3 (576i, SDTV)

Ownership
- Owner: Network18 Group
- Sister channels: Network18 Group channels

History
- Launched: 15 August 2001; 25 years ago
- Former names: ETV Urdu

Links
- Website: urdu.news18.com

Availability

Streaming media
- Live Stream: Watch Live

News18 Urdu is an Indian television network that broadcasts in Urdu and is owned by Network18 Group. it was launched on 15 August 2001 by media baron Ramoji Rao. It is the first Urdu Language channel of India.

== History ==
After identifying a lack of a channel that showcased the Urdu language, ETV Network started India's first Urdu language TV channel: ETV Urdu, on 15 August 2001. It now caters to a large section of Urdu speaking population in India. It also aims to target Pakistani viewers as Urdu is their national language. It publishes Urdu news portal from Hyderabad. It is also available in Bangladesh, Sri Lanka, UAE, United States and UK. Main programming includes serials, debates on culturally and socially relevant subjects, dramas, news, religious and other infotainment programs.

== Administration ==
News18 Urdu is India's full-time Urdu News channel which relays news and programs 24 hours a day. It is owned by Network 18 which is owned and operated by Reliance Industries. To cater to the needs of Maharashtra, Karnataka, West Bengal, Andhra Pradesh and Telangana states audience, the News 18 management started regional bulletins.

=== Advertisements ===
The ads in Urdu channel are telecast as L band and video ads. The base rate for a video ad is Rs.54 per second and Rs.2,250 per L-Band.
