= News18 Uttar Pradesh Uttarakhand =

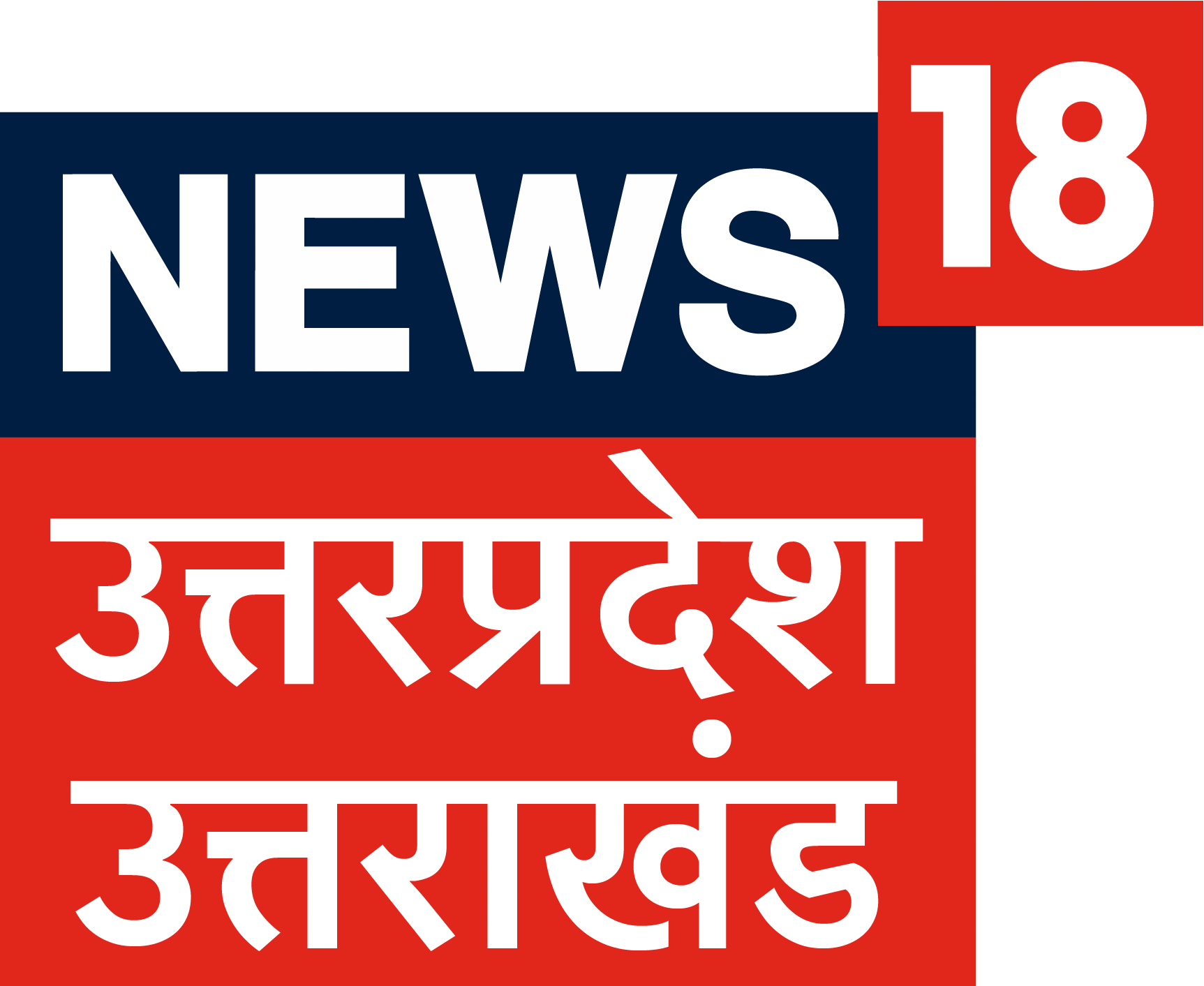
- Logo used since 2018
- Country: India
- Broadcast area: India
- Network: Broadcast television and online
- Headquarters: Lucknow, Uttar Pradesh, India

Programming
- Language: Hindi
- Picture format: 16:9 (576i, SDTV)

Ownership
- Owner: Network18 Group
- Sister channels: Network18 Group channels

History
- Launched: 27 January 2002; 24 years ago
- Replaced: ETV Uttar Pradesh Uttarakhand

Links
- Website: Official Website

Availability

Terrestrial
- DD Free Dish: 71

Streaming media
- Live Streaming: Watch Live

News18 Uttar Pradesh Uttarakhand is an Indian Hindi-regional television news channel, owned by Network18 Group. The channel is a free-to-air and was launched on 27 January 2002. On 16 March 2018, ETV Uttar Pradesh Uttarakhand was re-branded as News18 Uttar Pradesh Uttarakhand.

The channel airs advertisements up to 30 seconds between episodes of Uttar Pradesh and Uttarakhand's top shows.

== See also ==
- Network18 Group
- CNN-News18
