= News18 Kannada =

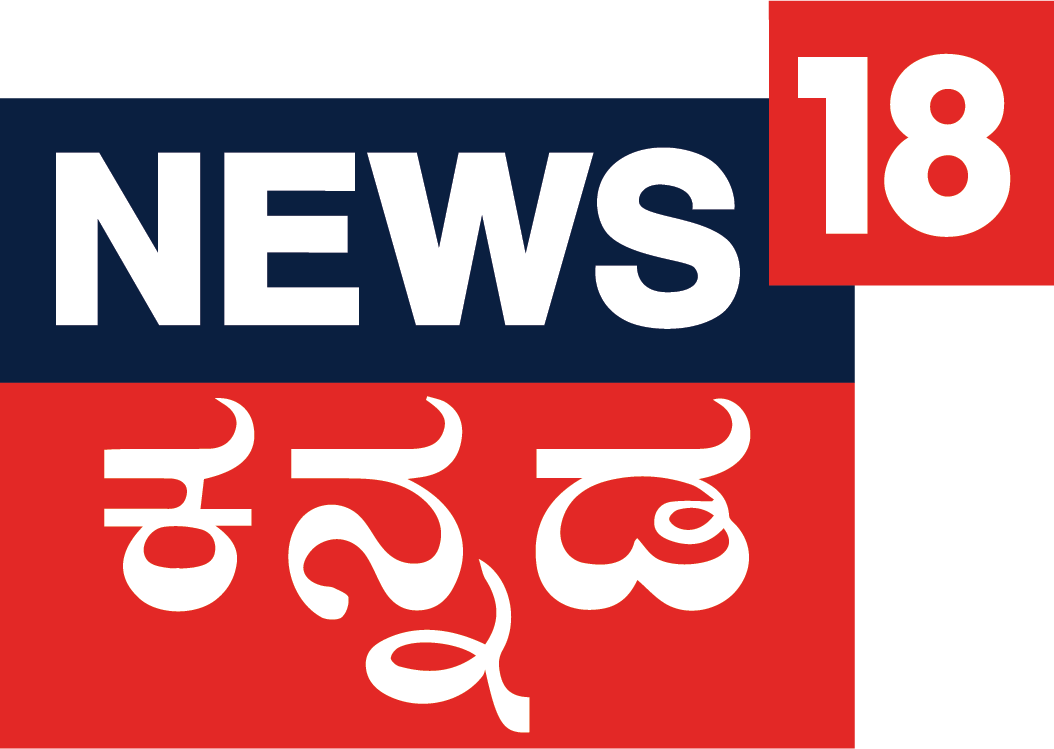
- Logo used since 2017
- Country: India
- Broadcast area: Karnataka
- Headquarters: Bengaluru, Karnataka, India

Programming
- Language: Kannada
- Picture format: 16:9 4:3 (576i, SDTV)

Ownership
- Owner: Network18 Group
- Sister channels: Network18 Group channels

History
- Launched: 19 March 2014; 12 years ago
- Replaced: ETV News Kannada

Links
- Website: kannada.news18.com

Availability

Streaming media
- Live Streaming: Watch Live

News18 Kannada is a Kannada news channel owned by Reliance Network18 Group, which went live on 20 March 2014. Initially, it used to be broadcast from the Hyderabad studio, until 2014 general elections, when the channel shifted its base to Bengaluru and set up five or six bureaus in the state. It was branded ETV News Kannada till 28 September 2017.

== See also ==
- List of Kannada-language television channels
- Television in India
- Media in Karnataka
- Mass media in India
