= TV5 (India) =

Indian Telugu-language TV channel

- Country: India
- Headquarters: Hyderabad, India

Programming
- Language: Telugu
- Picture format: 16:9 (576i, SDTV)

Ownership
- Owner: Shreya Broadcasting Pvt. Ltd.
- Key people: B. R. Naidu (Chairman); Bollineni Ravindranath (MD and Editor-in-Chief)
- Sister channels: TV5 Kannada; TV5 Money; TV5 USA; Hindu Dharmam

History
- Launched: 2 October 2007

Links
- Website: TV5 News

TV5 is an Indian Telugu-language 24-hour news channel in India, launched on 2 October 2007 by Shreya Broadcasting Pvt. Ltd. It was founded by B. R. Naidu (Bollineni Rajagopal Naidu) of Chittoor, who is also the current chairman of the Tirumala Tirupati Devasthanams (TTD) and the owner of Nuzen Hair Oil. The channel is managed by B. R. Naidu as the chairman, with Bollineni Ravindranath serving as the Managing Director and Editor-in-Chief. TV5 is perceived as a propaganda outlet for Nara Chandrababu Naidu. The channel has been found to be in breach of the News Broadcasting Standards Authority (NBSA) code of ethics on various occasions.

== History ==
TV5 is launched as a 24-hour Telugu news channel on 2 October 2007 by Shreya Broadcasting Pvt. Ltd. It is promoted by B. R. Naidu (Bollineni Rajagopal Naidu) of Chittoor. Naidu previously ran a travel agency. He is also the owner of the hair product company, Nuzen Hair Oil. TV5 is established from the profits of the hair oil business. B. R. Naidu, Bollineni Ravindranath, and Bollineni Surendranath are the board members and directors of the company.

The parent company also broadcasts TV5 USA, exclusive to Telugu audiences in the US. In August 2016, TV5 launched a digital entity called TV5 Money, exploiting its business specialization. It was made available as a YouTube channel, mobile app, website, and on IPTV platforms. TV5 Money focuses on real-time financial market coverage, business news, and lifestyle content.

On 29 March 2017, TV5 launched its devotional and spiritual channel, Hindu Dharmam on the occasion of Ugadi festival. As of March 2017, TV5 had around 300 reporters covering the states of Andhra Pradesh and Telangana.

In September 2017, TV5 announced the launch of TV5 Kannada focusing on Karnataka to mark its tenth anniversary. TV5 Kannada launched on the occasion of Mahatma Gandhi’s birthday on 2 October 2017.

== Controversies ==
Conspiracy theory on Rajasekhara Reddy's death

In January 2010, TV5 broadcast a conspiracy theory by the American journalist Mark Ames in the Russian online tabloid The eXile, on the death of former Andhra Pradesh chief minister, Y. S. Rajasekhara Reddy in a helicopter crash on 2 September 2009, alleging that Ambani brothers of Reliance group of companies orchestrated the death of Reddy. TV5 broke the story while Sakshi TV and NTV relayed the report aired by TV5.

The report led to massive attacks against the business establishments owned by the two Ambani brothers in Andhra Pradesh. On 8 January 2010, senior executive editor of TV5, Brahmananda Reddy and input editor, P. Venkata Krishna were arrested by the CID police of Andhra. Criminal cases were also filed against Sakshi TV and NTV. Editors Guild of India asked the channels to desist from "irresponsible reporting" and condemned the reporting as sensational and against the principles of journalism. However, various journalists' associations also protested against the arrest of TV5 journalists and called for the immediate release of the arrested duo, and the withdrawal of the cases filed against them.
