= Ramoji Group =

India conglomerate

- Industry: Conglomerate
- Founded: 1962; 64 years ago
- Founder: Cherukuri Ramoji Rao
- Headquarters: Hyderabad, Telangana, India
- Area served: Worldwide
- Services: Mass media, Entertainment, film production, financial services, retail, education, hospitality

Ramoji Group is an Indian conglomerate founded by Ramoji Rao and headquartered in Hyderabad, India. Its businesses cover television and newspaper media, film production, financial services, retail, education and hospitality.

In 1996, one of its businesses, Ramoji Film City, was recognized by Guinness World Records as the largest film studio complex in the world.

== Holdings ==
=== Ramoji Film City ===
Ramoji Film City is situated near Hayathnagar in Hyderabad, Telangana. Ramoji Rao bought 2000 acres of private land in 1995 December, then construction started immediately and film city opened in 1996 and was certified by Guinness World Records as the largest integrated film city. Off late Ramoji film city is the only studio to completed construction in one year, it's great achievement. It contains over 1,666 acres (6.74 km^{2}) of land, and is the site for Ushakiran Movies. It hosts a theme park and the Ramoji Academy of Film and Television (RAFT), which offers degrees in filmmaking.

=== Eenadu ===
Eenadu, which started in 1974 in Visakhapatnam, is one of India's largest circulated regional language daily newspapers. Its Telugu language daily is printed from 23 centers.

=== ETV Network ===
ETV Network is a satellite television network of 12 channels aired in eight languages: Telugu, Bangla, Marathi, Kannada, Odia, Gujarati, Urdu and Hindi. It reaches out to viewers in Uttar Pradesh, Rajasthan, Bihar and Madhya Pradesh and has a dedicated channel for each of the four Hindi-speaking states.

Ushakiran Television carries out television content development for ETV. It has divisions all over India and employs over 1000 people.

=== Ushakiran Movies ===
Ushakiran Movies, founded in 1983, has produced over 80 films in various Indian languages such as Telugu, Hindi, Tamil, Malayalam, Kannada, Marathi, Bengali. It distributes its films through Mayuri.

=== ETV Bharat ===
ETV Bharat is a digital news platform created to deliver news and information services using video-centric mobile app and web portals. It has network reach of 24 states with services in 13 languages. ETV Bharat will combine the new technologies of mobile and digital media to engage news and information seekers in a new connected world.

=== Other holdings ===
- Margadarsi Chit Fund: The group's flagship company, which was founded in 1962 in a small rented building on Himayat Nagar road, which is one of the largest chit fund (financial instrument) companies, and has a subscriber base of 6,000,000 members.
- Dolphin Hotels: The group set up its first three-star hotel in Visakhapatnam in the 1980s and now operates a range of hotels in Ramoji Film City from luxury Hotel Sitara to budget property Tara.
- Kalanjali: A large shopping mall that offers arts, crafts and textiles from all parts of India.
- Priya Foods: Manufacturing and marketing condiments, confectionery and edible oils.
- Brisah: Women's clothing brand, specializing in formal dress and party wear.
- Ramadevi Public School: ICSE school in Hyderabad established in 2002. Sponsored by Ramadevi Trust
- Eenadu Journalism School
