= Eenadu =

Largest circulated Telugu newspaper

Eenadu ఈనాడు
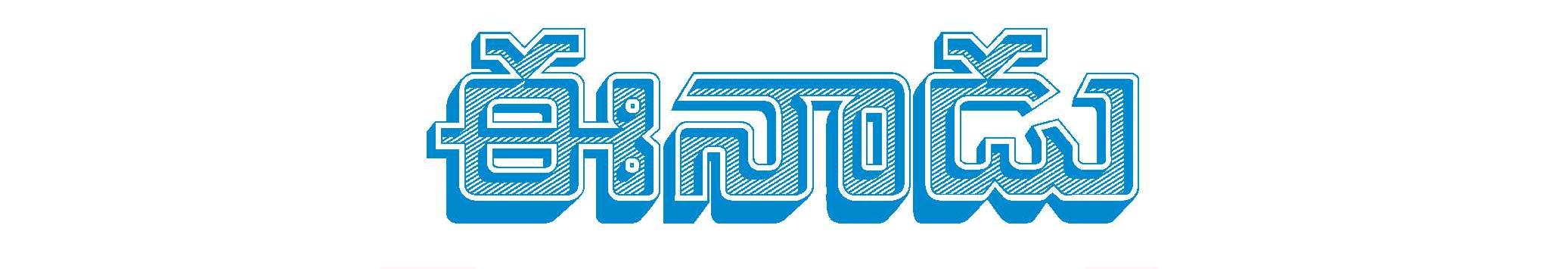

- Front page of Eenadu, 5 June 2024
- Type: Daily newspaper
- Format: Broadsheet
- Owner: Ramoji Group
- Founder: Ramoji Rao
- Publisher: Eenadu Publications
- Editor-in-chief: M.Nageswara Rao
- Founded: 1974; 52 years ago, Vishakapatnam, Andhra Pradesh, India
- Language: Telugu
- Headquarters: Somajiguda, Hyderabad, Telangana, India
- Circulation: 1,351,956 (as of Dec 2022)
- Website: www.eenadu.net

Eenadu (Telugu: ఈనాడు; lit. 'Today/This Land') is the largest circulated Telugu-language daily newspaper In India predominantly distributed in the states of Andhra Pradesh and Telangana. It was founded by Ramoji Rao in 1974 in Visakhapatnam and has been a significant presence in Telugu journalism. Ramoji Rao served as the chief editor until 2020.

== Name ==
Eenadu is a polysemic word which has two meanings in Telugu language — "today/this day" and "this land".

== History ==
=== Early days in Visakhapatnam ===
Eenadu was launched from Visakhapatnam on 10 August 1974 by Ramoji Rao, a businessman who had previously achieved success with Priya Pickles and Margadarsi Chitfunds. At that time, the Andhra Prabha, owned by the Indian Express Group, was the leading regional newspaper.

Initially, the circulation of Eenadu was limited. When launched in the city of Visakhapatnam, it was not able to sell more than 3,000 copies a week. Eenadu found itself struggling to become a daily publication among publications. However, it was popular in certain regions and rivalry was still an issue. Eenadu hired a new set of directors to be part of its key decision and management group which drove it towards what it is today: the most highly circulated newspaper in the region.

=== Expansion to other regions ===
Eenadu began with a print order of 4,000 copies, composed by hand and produced using a second-hand printing press. But by the time it was admitted into the Audit Bureau of Circulations in 1976, its circulation had already reached a readership of 48,000. By 1978, Eenadu surpassed Andhra Prabha's circulation and, by 1995, two other rivals Andhra Patrika and Udayam folded, leaving Eenadu with over seventy-five percent of the audited circulation of Telugu dailies.

Its expansion has partially been attributed to its use of regional dialects, colloquialisms, idioms and sarcasm in its reporting, as well as colorful pictures with captions.

When Eenadu expanded to Hyderabad in 1975, it divided the city into target areas, recruited delivery boys three months in advance and handed out the paper freely for a week. During the 1980s, technology-enabled Eenadu to spread over larger areas beyond only the main cities. Earlier, it was difficult to manage even the three editions of the 1970s (the Visakhapatnam, Vijayawada and Hyderabad editions) because the only communication facilities available to the publication at the time were the telegram, telephone, and teleprinter, all of which had limited presence in rural Andhra Pradesh.

By 1979, the newspaper expanded to include Sitara, a weekly film magazine, Vipula, a monthly magazine with short stories, Chatura, a monthly novel and Annadatha, a farmer's monthly. However, the magazines stopped circulation in 2017 due to lack of demand in favour of web content.

=== Political impact and TDP support ===
Support of the Telugu Desam Party (TDP) by Eenadu has been recorded since the party's foundation in 1982. This has been attributed to Ramoji Rao's disdain for the Congress government, to the point that he planned to create a regional party on his own accord, and a personal rapport he formed with the party founder and leader N. T. Rama Rao, who he had first doubted but eventually saw political potential in. Another factor that has been cited is caste politics, with both Eenadu and the TDP being perceived as Kamma-oriented organisations and both Raos being Kammas themselves, although this view has been challenged. During the 1983 elections, the party and the paper formed a symbiotic relationship as Eenadu not only publicised, promoted and ran positive stories on Rama Rao's campaign, but also gave more direct support, such as utilising its network of journalists to inform and advise Rama Rao on local issues for his stops and designing party advertisements through Ramoji Rao's marketing agency. This coverage led to a massive increase in subscriptions, with Eenadu going from a circulation of 230,000 copies to 350,000 in the six months of Rama Rao's electoral campaign and becoming one of the state's most popular newspapers. The TDP would go on to successfully sweep the election, making Rama Rao the chief minister of Andhra Pradesh, and over half a million copies were printed of Eenadu to declare this victory. Reportedly, Ramoji Rao sent a bill to Rama Rao for 3 million (30 lakh) rupees for the assistance he had given to the campaign. In response, film personality Dasari Narayana Rao and industrialist Gireesh Kumar Sanghi would launch pro-Congress newspapers of their own and eventually become members of the Rajya Sabha on the Congress ticket.

When Rama Rao and his government faced crises and parliamentary revolts in the 1980s, Eenadu continually supported him and clamored for his restoration to power. Despite Rama Rao's growing unpopularity in the later part of the decade due to perceptions of failed promises, the paper refrained from criticising him before expressing some concerns about his leadership in response to his continued loss of public support and the Congress victory in the 1989 Andhra Pradesh Legislative Assembly election. In the 1990s, as fissures developed between Rama Rao and his son-in-law and prominent party leader N. Chandrababu Naidu, Eenadu ultimately took Naidu's side, publishing mocking portrayals of Rama Rao depicting him as being manipulated by his new wife Lakshmi Parvathi, and eventually played a key role in the internal party coup by supporting Naidu's power grab. This paved the way for Naidu to become the next chief minister and ensured a friendly relationship between the paper and his administration. During the reign of Congress governments, Eenadu went on the offensive and became their "chief critic"; both Y. S. Rajasekhara Reddy and his son Y. S. Jagan Mohan Reddy would "fight back" during their time in power. This took on multiple forms, from the 2004 investigation of Margadarsi for irregular financial practices to the launch of Sakshi in 2008 under Jagan Mohan Reddy's ownership as a "counter" to what his father, the CM at the time, claimed was "biased news" from traditionally TDP-supporting papers.

=== Further publications ===
With the introduction of offset printing, photocomposing software and computers, Eenadu was able to launch editions in smaller towns like Tirupathi in 1982. From the 1980s, the news editor of Eenadu oversaw an enormous local-based news gathering and disseminating organization from his Hyderabad office.

By the end of the 1980s, there were six substantial Telugu dailies running, and the business was highly competitive. In 1989 Eenadu introduced "district dailies (tabloid edition)" to carry its presence not only into district towns like Rajamahendravaram, Karimnagar, Guntur and Adilabad, but also taluka towns like Suryapet and Tadepalligudem. Each publication center required forty engineers to run its printing presses. Eenadu's district dailies were based on market research asserting that heavy local content would generate new groups of readers and boost advertising revenue. Currently, the district dailies print local news specifically for each major location in the area, thereby negating the need for any separate local daily. Few special sections are published every day of the week. To support the local tabloid dailies, Eenadu hired "stringers" working for the commission who coordinated their reporting with editors over the telephone and contracted bus companies to transport their reports back to the district headquarters for publication. Additionally, to increase revenue, the newspaper recruited salespersons to convince local businesses to buy ad spots.

Eenadu later ventured into other markets such as finance and chit funds (e.g. Margadarsi chits), foods (Priya Foods), film production (Ushakiran Movies), film distribution (Mayuri Films), and television (ETV). All the businesses are organized under the Ramoji Group.

== Ownership ==
Eenadu newspaper is owned by Ushodaya Enterprises Private Limited, a part of Ramoji Group. As per the 2018 report of Media Ownership Monitor, Ramoji Rao and family own 97.56% stake in Ushodaya Enterprises. In terms of individual ownership, Ramoji Rao holds 42.26%, his eldest son Cherukuri Kiron holds 28.36%, and his daughter-in-law Cherukuri Vijayeswari (wife of the deceased younger son, Cherukuri Suman) holds 25.38% shares in Ushodaya Enterprises.

== Circulation ==
According to the Audit Bureau of Circulations for the H12022, Eenadu had a circulation of 1,223,862, ranked at 7th place among daily newspapers in India. For Q2 2019, Eenadu ranks eighth among the most circulated Indian-language dailies with a circulation of 1,614,105. Thus there was a loss of 24.18% during COVID.

== See also ==
- Sakshi
