= List of Hindi television channels =

Hindi-language TV channels available in India

== Government-owned channels ==
Channel	Launch	Video	Owner
DD National	1959	SD+HD	Doordarshan, Prasar Bharati
DD Bharati	2002	SD	Doordarshan, Prasar Bharati
Sansad TV 1	2021	SD+HD	Government of India
Sansad TV 2	2021	SD+HD	Government of India

== General entertainment ==
Channel	Launch	Fresh Content	Paid/Free	Video	Owner
StarPlus	1991	Yes	Paid	SD+HD	JioStar
Star Bharat	2017	No	Paid	SD+HD	JioStar
Star Utsav	2004	No	Free	SD	JioStar
Colors TV	2008	Yes	Paid	SD+HD	JioStar
Colors Rishtey	2013	No	Free	SD	JioStar
Zee TV	1992	Yes	Paid	SD+HD	Zee Entertainment Enterprises
&TV	2015	No	Paid	SD+HD	Zee Entertainment Enterprises
Anmol TV	2013	No	Free	SD	Zee Entertainment Enterprises
Sony Entertainment Television	1995	Yes	Paid	SD+HD	Sony Pictures Networks
Sony SAB	1999	Yes	Paid	SD+HD	Sony Pictures Networks
Sony Pal	2014	No	Free	SD	Sony Pictures Networks
Dangal	2009	Yes	Free	SD	Enterr10 Television Network
Dangal 2	2022	No	Free	SD	Enterr10 Television Network
Shemaroo TV	2020	No	Free	SD	Shemaroo Entertainment
Shemaroo Umang	2022	No	Free	SD	Shemaroo Entertainment
Manoranjan Grand	2019	No	Free	SD	Manoranjan TV Group Limited
Epic Parivaar	2021	No	Free	SD	The Epic Company
Epic Bharat	2023	No	Free	SD	The Epic Company
Sun Neo	2024	Yes	Free	SD	Sun TV Network

=== Defunct channels ===
Channel	Launch	Defunct	Owner
Metro Gold	2000	2001	Doordarshan & Nine Network
B4U TV	2000	2001	B4U Multimedia International Limited
Sahara One	2000	2016	Sahara One Media & Entertainment Limited
Star One	2004	2011	JioStar
Zee Smile	2004	2016	Zee Entertainment Enterprises
9X	2007	2015	Zee Entertainment Enterprises
Zee Next	2007	2008	Zee Entertainment Enterprises
Imagine TV	2008	2012	Warner Bros. Discovery India
Firangi	2008	2021	Sahara One Media & Entertainment Ltd
Real	2009	2010	Warner Bros. Discovery India
Life OK	2011	2017	JioStar
Zindagi	2014	2017	Zee Entertainment Enterprises
Jeet Prime	2018	2020	Warner Bros. Discovery India
Azaad TV	2021	2022	Beginnen Media

== Movies ==
Channel	Launch	Paid/Free	Video	Ratio	Owner	Notes
Zee Cinema	1995	Paid	SD+HD	16:9	Zee Entertainment Enterprises	
Zee Classic	2005	Paid	SD	4:3	Zee Entertainment Enterprises	
Zee Action	2006	Free	SD	4:3	Zee Entertainment Enterprises	Also called as Action Cinema
&pictures	2013	Paid	SD+HD	16:9	Zee Entertainment Enterprises	Toonami themed from 2013 to 2020
Anmol Cinema	2016	Free	SD	4:3	Zee Entertainment Enterprises	
Zee Bollywood	2018	Paid	SD	4:3	Zee Entertainment Enterprises	
&xplor HD	2019	Paid	HD	16:9	Zee Entertainment Enterprises	
Anmol Cinema 2	2024	Free	SD	4:3	Zee Entertainment Enterprises	
Sony Max	1999	Paid	SD+HD	16:9	Culver Max Entertainment	
Sony Max 2	2014	Paid	SD	16:9	Culver Max Entertainment	
Sony Wah	2016	Free	SD	16:9	Culver Max Entertainment	
Sony Max 1	2025	Paid	SD	16:9	Culver Max Entertainment	
Star Gold	1999	Paid	SD+HD	16:9	JioStar	
Star Utsav Movies	2016	Free	SD	4:3	JioStar	
Star Gold Select	2017	Paid	SD+HD	16:9	JioStar	
Star Gold 2	2020	Paid	SD+HD	16:9	JioStar	Formerly MoviesOK
Star Gold Romance	2023	Paid	SD	16:9	JioStar	
Star Gold Thrills	2023	Paid	SD	16:9	JioStar	
Colors Cineplex	2016	Paid	SD+HD	16:9	JioStar	
Colors Cineplex Bollywood	2021	Free	SD	4:3	JioStar	
Colors Cineplex Superhits	2022	Free	SD	4:3	JioStar	
B4U Movies	1999	Free	SD	4:3	B4U	
Manoranjan TV	2010	Free	SD	4:3	Manoranjan TV Group Limited	
Manoranjan Prime	2022	Free	SD	4:3	Manoranjan TV Group Limited	
All Time Movies	2024	Free	SD	4:3	Pen Studios	
Goldmines	2020	Free	SD	16:9	Goldmines Telefilms	Formerly Dhinchaak
Goldmines Bollywood	2022	Free	SD	4:3	Goldmines Telefilms	Formerly Dhinchaak 2
Goldmines Movies	2023	Free	SD	4:3	Goldmines Telefilms	Formerly Goldmines Bhojpuri
Shemaroo Josh	2025	Free	SD	16:9	Shemaroo Entertainment	Formerly Chumbak TV

=== Defunct channels ===
Channel	Launch	Closed	Owner
Zee Premier	2006	2015	Zee Entertainment Enterprises
Filmy	2006	2016	Sahara One Media and Entertainment Limited
UTV Movies	2008	2023	JioStar
UTV Action	2010	2023	JioStar
UTV HD	2018	2023	JioStar
Movies OK	2012	2020	JioStar
Ashirwad Classic	2013	2015	B4U
Movie House	2015	2019	B4U
Dhamaka Movies B4U	2022	2024	B4U
Housefull Movies	2015	2021	Swami Films Entertainment Pvt Ltd
Housefull Action	2015	2020	Swami Films Entertainment Pvt Ltd
Multiplex	2015	2018	Swami Films Entertainment Pvt Ltd
Box Cinema	2019	2022	Box Cinemedia Services Pvt Ltd
RT Movies	2015	2018	Royal Television Pvt Ltd
Surya Cinema	2018	2021	Surya Sagar Entertainment Pvt Ltd
Abzy Movies	2014	2024	Skystar Entertainment Pvt Ltd
Abzy Cool	2019	2024	Skystar Entertainment Pvt Ltd
Dhinchaak	2020	2022	Goldmines Telefilms
Dhinchaak (Relaunch)	2023	2024	Goldmines Telefilms

== Music ==
Channel	Launch	Video	Owner
B4U Music	1999	SD	B4U Network Limited
Zoom	2004	SD	The Times Group
Music India	2006	SD	Media Worldwide Private Limited
9XM	2007	SD	9X Media
9X Jalwa	2010	SD	9X Media
Epic Music	2019	SD	The Epic Company

== Youth ==
Channel	Launch	Video	Owner
MTV	1996	SD+HD	JioStar
Zing	1997	SD	Zee Entertainment Enterprises
Q TV	2017	SD	QYOU Media

== Kids ==
Channel	Launch	Video	Owner
Cartoon Network	1995	SD+HD	Warner Bros. Discovery India
Nickelodeon	1999	SD+HD	JioStar
Disney Channel	2004	SD+HD	JioStar
Hungama	2004	SD	JioStar
Pogo	2004	SD	Warner Bros. Discovery India
Discovery Kids	2012	SD	Warner Bros. Discovery India
Disney Jr.	2012	SD	JioStar
Nick Jr.	2012	SD	JioStar
Sony YAY!	2017	SD	Culver Max Entertainment
Epic Kids	2020	SD	The Epic Company
ETV Bal Bharat	2021	SD+HD	ETV Network
Super Hungama	2022	SD	JioStar

== Infotainment & lifestyle ==
Channel	Launch	Video	Owner
Discovery Channel	1995	SD+HD	Warner Bros. Discovery India
National Geographic	1998	SD+HD	JioStar
Animal Planet	1999	SD+HD	Warner Bros. Discovery India
TLC	2004	SD+HD	Warner Bros. Discovery India
NDTV Good Times	2007	SD	NDTV
Nat Geo Wild	2009	SD+HD	JioStar
Discovery Science	2010	SD	Warner Bros. Discovery India
History TV18	2011	SD+HD	JioStar
Travelxp	2011	SD+HD	Celebrities Management Private Limited
Food Food	2011	SD	Turmeric Vision Private Limited
Epic TV	2014	SD	The Epic Company
Investigation Discovery	2014	SD+HD	Warner Bros. Discovery India
DD Kisan	2015	SD+HD	Doordarshan
Zee Zest	2015	SD+HD	Zee Entertainment Enterprises
Sony BBC Earth	2017	SD+HD	Culver Max Entertainment
Foodxp	2022	SD	Celebrities Management Private Limited

== News ==
=== National news channels ===
Channel	Launch	Video	Owner
ABP News	1998	SD	ABP Group (formerly Star India)
Zee News	1999	SD+HD	Zee Media Corporation
Aaj Tak	2000	SD+HD	Living Media (formerly Culver Max Entertainment)
DD News	2003	SD+HD	Prasar Bharati
NDTV India	2003	SD+HD	NDTV
India TV	2004	SD+HD	Independent News Services Limited
News18 India	2005	SD	Network18 Group (Formerly TV18)
Sadhna News	2005	SD	Asia Limited
Sudarshan News	2005	SD	Suresh Chavhanke
India News	2007	SD	ITV Network
News 24	2007	SD	B. A. G. Films
News Nation	2013	SD	Celebrities Management Private Limited
Zee Bharat	2017	SD	Zee Media Corporation
Surya Samachar	2018	SD	Surya Sagar Communication Pvt Ltd
Republic Bharat	2019	SD	Republic Media Network
TV9 Bharatvarsh	2019	SD	Associated Broadcasting Company Private Limited (ABCPL)
Times Now Navbharat	2021	SD+HD	The Times Group
Good News Today	2021	SD	Living Media
Bharat 24	2022	SD	Jaipur Media and Broadcasting Pvt Ltd
ET Now Swadesh	2022	SD	The Times Group
Bharat Express	2023	SD	Upendra Rai

=== Regional news channels ===
==== Bihar and Jharkhand ====
Channel	Launch	Video	Owner
News18 Bihar Jharkhand	2002	SD	Network18 Group (Formerly TV18)
Zee Bihar Jharkhand	2017	SD	Zee Media Corporation

==== Madhya Pradesh and Chhattisgarh ====
Channel	Launch	Video	Owner
News18 Madhya Pradesh Chhattisgarh	2002	SD	Network18 Group (Formerly TV18)
Zee Madhya Pradesh Chhattisgarh	2013	SD	Zee Media Corporation
News 24 Madhya Pradesh Chhattisgarh	2021	SD	B. A. G. Films
NDTV Madhya Pradesh Chhattisgarh	2023	SD	NDTV

==== Uttar Pradesh and Uttarakhand ====
Channel	Launch	Video	Owner
News18 Uttar Pradesh Uttarakhand	2002	SD	Network18 Group (Formerly TV18)
Bharat Samachar	2016	SD	Time Today Media Network Private Limited
Zee Uttar Pradesh Uttarakhand	2017	SD	Zee Media Corporation

==== Rajasthan ====
- India News Rajasthan
- Jan TV
- News18 Rajasthan
- Zee Rajasthan News
- NDTV Rajasthan

==== Haryana ====
- Zee Punjab Haryana Himachal (a part)
- India News Haryana
- Zee Delhi NCR Haryana (a part)

==== Andhra Pradesh and Telangana ====
- 10TV
- 99TV
- ABN Andhra Jyothi
- ETV Andhra Pradesh
- HMTV
- NTV
- Sakshi TV
- Studio N
- T News
- TV5 News
- TV9 Telugu
- V6 News
- Zee Telugu News

=== Business news channels ===
- CNBC Awaaz
- ET Now Swadesh
- Zee Business

== Religious ==
- Aastha TV
- Aastha Bhajan
- Vedic
- Hare Krsna TV
- Lord Buddha TV
- Sanskar TV

== Sports ==
- DD Sports
- Eurosport
- Sony Sports Ten 3 Hindi
- Star Sports khel
- Star Sports 3
- Unite8 Sports 1

== See also ==
- List of HD channels in India
