= B4U =

B4U may refer to:

== Broadcast media ==
- B4U (network), a Bollywood media corporation
  - B4U (TV channel), an Indian satellite television station
  - B4U Movies, a television station focusing on movies owned by B4U Networks
    - ATN B4U Movies, the Canadian version of the station
  - B4U Music, a television station focusing on music owned by B4U Networks
    - ATN B4U Music, the Canadian version of the station
  - B4U Aflam, a television station focusing on Hindi movies in Arabic owned by B4U Networks
  - B4U Bhojpuri, a television station focusing on Bhojpuri movies owned by B4U Networks

== Music ==
- BeForU, a J-pop group
  - BeForU (album), the first album by the group
