= Subrata Roy =

Indian businessman (1948–2023)

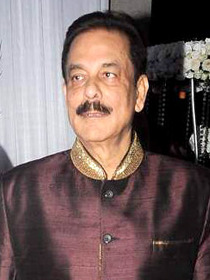
- Born: 10 June 1948; Araria, Bihar, India
- Died: 14 November 2023 (aged 75); Mumbai, Maharashtra, India
- Education: Mechanical engineering
- Alma mater: Government Technical Institute, Gorakhpur
- Occupations: Founder and chairman of Sahara India Pariwar
- Years active: 1978–2023

Subrata Roy (10 June 1948 – 14 November 2023) was an Indian businessman who founded the business conglomerate Sahara India Pariwar in 1978.

Roy was named the tenth-most influential Indian businessman in 2012 by India Today. In 2004, the Sahara group was termed by Time magazine as "the second largest employer in India after Indian Railways". Sahara India Pariwar has operated a vast number of businesses, such as Aamby Valley City, Sahara Movie Studios, Air Sahara, Uttar Pradesh Wizards, and Filmy, among others.

Long accused of shady business practices including money laundering and running ponzi schemes, Roy was arrested in 2014 after failing to appear in court in connection with the ₹24,000 crore deposits his company had not refunded to investors. He was granted bail in 2016. He died in 2023.

== Early life ==
Subrata Roy was born into a Bengali Hindu family in Araria on 10 June 1948 to Sudhir Chandra Roy and Chhabi Roy. His father and mother came from Dhaka, Bikrampur, East Bengal (now Bangladesh) from a rich landlord family named Bhagyakul Zamindar.

Roy studied at Holy Child Institute in Kolkata and later studied mechanical engineering at Government Technical Institute, Gorakhpur. Roy started his first business in Gorakhpur.

== Business career ==
Roy joined Sahara Finance, a struggling company, in 1976, that ran a chit fund and took it over. He changed its financial model in 1978. Sahara is said to have used the financial model of much older Peerless Group. They are termed residuary non-banking companies (RNBCs) that accept deposits of very low amounts.

In the 1990s, Roy moved to Lucknow which became the base of his group. From there, it went on to become the largest conglomerate of India with a diversified range of business interests. The company now has interests in financial services, education, real estate, media, entertainment, tourism, healthcare, and hospitality.

The Hindi language newspaper Rashtriya Sahara was started in 1992. In the late 1990s, the ambitious Aamby Valley City project near Pune was initiated. In 2000, Sahara TV was launched which was later renamed Sahara One. In 2003, Sahara started three weeklies: Sahara Time (English), Sahara Samay (Hindi), and Sahara Aalmi (Urdu).

In 2010, Sahara purchased the iconic Grosvenor House Hotel in London, and then in 2012 the historic Plaza Hotel and Dream Downtown Hotel in New York City.

As of 2013, Sahara had a workforce of around 1.2 million including salaried employees, consultants, field workers, agents, and business associates. In 2013, 121,653 of its employees gathered in Lucknow to sing India's national anthem, setting a world record. In 2004, Sahara group was termed by Time magazine as "the second-largest employer in India" after the Government-run Indian Railways. Sahara claimed to have nine crore plus investors and depositors, representing about 13% of all households in India.

In 2017, Roy was planning to foray into online education (Edunguru) in India, which was targeted at small towns and villages. He put a team in place which consists of members from top universities and colleges across India, and even abroad. The route map of the program was prepared, and 14,000 hours of lectures were developed for this.

In June 2019, Roy announced his foray into the automobile sector under the brand name 'Sahara Evols'. The Sahara Evols venture is offering a wide range of electric vehicles (EVs) along with advanced allied services.

== Legal issues ==
Since 1990s, the Income Tax Department (IT) asserted that Sahara India Parivar is a money laundering operation. During their investigation, IT officials found many of the names and addresses of the depositors were fictitious. When IT officials asked Sahara to produce 62 depositors, the group could produce only 12 depositors. On 8 February 1997, IT department stated Sahara did not deny that leading politicians deposited their black money with it.

On 26 February 2014, the Supreme Court of India ordered the detention of Roy for failing to appear before it in connection with a legal dispute with Market Regulator – SEBI. In a statement after the arrest, his lawyer said Roy's 92-year-old mother was in poor health and needed "her eldest son" by her side, and hence he failed to appear at the court. As he failed to appear in the court during the ongoing legal battle, Roy was held in custody in the Tihar Jail, Delhi and was out on parole since May 2016. Sahara was allowed to sell a part of its assets in India to raise part of the money in question.

Roy rejected allegations of misconduct and accused the Indian National Congress of a witch hunt due to his opposition to Sonia Gandhi becoming the country's prime minister.

Initially he was granted interim bail by the Supreme Court on 26 March 2014 on condition of depositing ₹10,000 crore to the market regulator SEBI. His deposit of ₹10,000 crore was not made. As of August 2014, Roy was trying to sell some of his hotel properties to raise enough money. Roy was granted his first bail in May 2017 for four weeks to perform the last rites for his deceased mother, later extended to 24 October. From that time on he was successful in getting his bail extended on various grounds. As of 31 January 2019, Sahara still had to pay ₹10,621 crore to meet its total liability.

Roy claimed that the company's fundamentals were intact and assets were greater (3 to 5 times) than the liabilities. Sahara also deposited ₹22,500 crores, which it has been surmised will in due course of justice come back to Sahara India as it has already repaid 95% of its investors.

The Securities And Exchange Board of India (SEBI) has repaid only ₹64 crore to the investors since 2012. It has also been reported that Sahara has paid ₹725.97 crore as TDS (tax deducted at source) to the Income Tax Departments on the interest which along with investment was repaid to 95 percent of the investors, between 2009–2010 and 2012–2013. The income tax authorities had found that the beneficiary investors were existent and accordingly confirmed the repayments made in those particular years. One of Sahara's arguments in the apex court revolves around the fact that if one government body has found investors, why the other cannot do so.

In January 2017, Income Tax Settlement Commission (ITSC) granted Sahara immunity from prosecution and penalty after the raids it carried out in November 2014 during which the Sahara-Birla Papers listing alleged bribes to politicians were recovered. Rahul Gandhi criticised this Prime minister Narendra Modi over this move and asked, "Immunity for Sahara or immunity for Modiji?"

== Other activities ==
In 2004, Roy spent over 500 crore on weddings of both his sons Sushanto and Seemanto. Indian Prime minister Atal Bihari Vajpayee had also attended the wedding.

In 2013, Roy endorsed Narendra Modi for 2014 Indian general election.

In 2013, Sahara contributed to the relief efforts in flood hit Uttarakhand region wherein one lakh bottles of drinking water, packaged juice and food packets along with candles and match boxes were said to be provided by them. There were 25 medical health unit vans equipped with doctors and free medicines made available and it was said by the group that, they will contribute to the rehabilitation programme by constructing 10,000 pre-fabricated houses.

After the Kargil War, Prime Minister of India Atal Bihari Vajpayee praised Sahara India for providing financial support to the 127 families of martyrs.

Hotel Sahara Star in Mumbai partnered with Feeding India in 2021. As a part of its CSR initiatives, the hotel provides food to hungry people.

During his lifetime, he had written the following books:

- Shanti, Sukh: Santushti - 1994, Essays on peace of mind and happy living.
- Maan, Samman, Atmasamman
- Life Mantras - "Life Mantras" was released on 2 February 2016 in 5,120 public events across India. The book was among the top 5 in the Nielsen BookScan bestseller chart for India for four consecutive weeks.
- Think With Me - The second book of his trilogy was launched on 18 December 2016, at the national 'Think With Summit'.

== Personal life ==
Roy was married to Swapna Roy. They had two sons, Sushanto and Seemanto.

Swapna and Sushanto had taken citizenship of Macedonia in 2013.

== Death ==
Roy died due to cardiorespiratory arrest following an extended battle with complications arising from metastatic malignancy, hypertension and diabetes on 14 November 2023, at age 75. He had been admitted to Kokilaben Dhirubhai Ambani Hospital & Medical Research Institute in Mumbai on 12 November following a decline in health.

His sons, Sushanto and Seemanto, residing outside India did not attend the funeral. His 16-year-old grandson performed the last rites. The funeral was attended by over 5,000 people including a number of prominent figures.

== Awards and honours ==
- Roy received an honorary doctorate in business leadership from the University of East London in 2013
- A Business Icon of the Year award at the Powerbrands Hall of Fame Awards in London in 2011
- He was the ITA– TV Icon of the Year in 2007.
- He received the Global Leadership Award in 2004.

Roy was awarded a general jury award by the Indian Television Academy Awards and an honorary degree of D.Litt. by Lalit Narayan Mithila University, Darbhanga.

Roy featured regularly in the India Today list of 50 Most Powerful People of India since 2003 and was named its tenth-most influential businessmen in 2012.

== In popular culture ==
- Bad Boy Billionaires: India - 2020 Netflix original documentary anthology webseries. On 28 August 2020, two petitions were filed against the release of the documentary in the Bihar District Court. The Bihar Court passed an interim stay order on the petition filed by Roy against the release of the documentary on the Netflix platform. Following the stay order by the Bihar court, Netflix threatened to move the Supreme Court against the court order for restraining the documentary release.
