= List of Bhojpuri-language television channels =

This is a list of Bhojpuri language television channels in India.

== Government-owned channels ==
- DD Bihar
- DD Uttar Pradesh

== General entertainment ==
- Pasand TV

=== Defunct channels ===
- Abzy Dhakad
- Dishum TV
- Mahuaa TV
- Surya Bhojpuri
- Zee Ganga

== Music ==
- Dabangg TV
- Sangeet Bhojpuri

== Movies ==
- B4U Bhojpuri
- Bhojpuri Cinema TV
- Zee Biskope
- Oscar Movies Bhojpuri
- Raapchik
- Epic Bhojpuri

=== Defunct channels ===
- Rishu Movies Bhojpuri
- Goldmines Bhojpuri

== OTT platforms ==
- Eros Now
- JioHotstar
- Lionsgate+
- Amazon MX Player
- ZEE5
