= Manoranjan Grand =

Indian Hindi Entertainment Channel

- Country: India
- Broadcast area: India
- Headquarters: New Delhi, Delhi, India

Programming
- Language: Hindi
- Picture format: 576i (SDTV)

Ownership
- Owner: Manoranjan TV Group Limited
- Sister channels: Manoranjan TV; Manoranjan Movies; Khushboo Bangla; Manoranjan Prime

History
- Launched: 15 August 2019; 6 years ago

Manoranjan Grand is an Indian free-to-air entertainment channel that was owned by Manoranjan TV Group Limited. This channel airs animated stories and cartoon shows. Now it also telecasts Pakistani Serials from Sab TV Pakistan on Prime Time.

== Current shows ==
=== Animated ===
- The Jungle Book
- Vir The Robot Boy
- Chacha Bhatija

=== Telenovela ===
- Carita De Angel (upcoming)

== Former shows ==
- Aap Beeti
- Ajnabi Humsafar
- Baazi
- Bhajan Mala
- Crime Special
- Draupadi
- Ganesh Leela
- Haunted Nights
- Hara Sindoor
- Jhilmil Sitaaron Ka Aangan Hoga
- Jannat Chor Di Main Ne
- Jai Hanuman
- Kahani Chandrakanta Ki
- Kesariya Balam Aavo Hamare Des
- Mata Ki Chowki
- Malini Iyer
- Maa Shakti
- Meri Dilli Wali Girlfriend
- Parshuram
- Om Namo Narayan
- Om Namah Shivay
- Pyar Mein Savdhaan
- Rishton Ke Bhanwar Mein Uljhi Niyati
- Vishnu Puran
- Woh Rehne Waali Mehlon Ki
- Zaara Pyaar Ki Saugat
