= Studio N =

Studio N may refer to:

- Studio N (company)
- Studio N (TV channel)
