= Amanullah Nezami =

Afghan entrepreneur and Hindi film collector

Amanullah Nezami is an Afghan entrepreneur and Hindi film collector. Nezami is known for holding the largest private collection of Indian films and music produced between 1940-1980. Sahara India Pariwar produced a documentary on his life and collection.

Nezami moved to Saudi Arabia from Afghanistan where he started and expanded a chain of successful restaurants, Al Khalifa.

He travels to India on yearly bases where he meets his favorite actors and gifts them unique items, such as a photo of Lata Mangeshkar on boxes of chocolates.

His collection includes more than 5000 titles produced over four decades.
