= Ghayal: Once Again =

2016 Indian film by Sunny Deol

Ghayal Once Again
- Theatrical release poster
- Directed by: Sunny Deol
- Written by: Sanjay Masoomm; Sunny Deol; Vishal Vijay Kumar
- Story by: Shaktimaan Talwar; Sunny Deol; Sagar Pandya
- Produced by: Dharmendra
- Starring: Sunny Deol; Soha Ali Khan; Om Puri; Shivam Patil; Rishabh Arora; Abhilash Kumar; Neha Khan; Aanchal Munjal; Narendra Jha
- Cinematography: Ravi Yadav
- Edited by: Chandan Arora
- Music by: Songs: Shankar–Ehsaan–Loy; Score: Vipin Mishra
- Production companies: Vijayta Films; Indigo Creation Production
- Distributed by: Reliance Entertainment; PVR Pictures (India); B4U Motion Pictures (Overseas)
- Release date: 5 February 2016
- Running time: 127 minutes
- Country: India
- Language: Hindi
- Budget: ₹40 crore

Ghayal: Once Again (transl. Wounded: Once again) is a 2016 Indian Hindi-language action drama film written and directed by Sunny Deol and produced by Dharmendra under Vijayta Films. The film, a direct sequel to Ghayal, stars Sunny Deol, Soha Ali Khan, Om Puri, Shivam Patil, Rishabh Arora, Abhilash Kumar, Neha Khan, Aanchal Munjal and Narendra Jha. The soundtrack and musical score were composed by Shankar–Ehsaan–Loy and Vipin Mishra, while cinematography and editing were handled by Ravi Yadav and Chandan Arora.

Ghayal: Once Again was released worldwide on 5 February 2016.

== Plot ==
After the events of the previous film, Ajay Mehra gets released from prison and begins a new career as a reporter for an independent newspaper. He also works as a vigilante who assists the police with their hard-to-prosecute cases (including cases where the accused are prominent and influential members of society). One such case involves small town reporter Renu who was drugged and assaulted by media baron Aditya Rajguru. Renu committed suicide and Rajguru's men covered up the matter, implicating her innocent boyfriend. Ajay swings into action and abducts Rajguru, soon forcibly obtaining his DNA. Rajguru is then arrested and Ajay is declared a sensational hero. However, Ajay still suffers anxiety attacks from the painful memories of his past. His psychiatrist girlfriend Dr. Rhea helps him with his problems.

Joe D'Souza has retired and is now a social activist. Ajay often collaborates with him and helps him out. However, D'Souza is killed in a traffic accident in Panvel. A blogger named Zoya Saigal is shocked to discover that Joe was actually shot dead. She had accidentally captured the murder on video, committed by Kabir Raj Bansal, who is the son of business mogul Raj Bansal. Zoya and her friends panic and want to take the video to the cops, but Zoya's friend Anushka's maternal grandfather infers that Raj Bansal had staged the road accident (where 8 other innocent people were killed) and stops them, due to Bansal's power. It is further revealed that D'Souza had visited Raj Bansal and directly accused him of illegal land acquisition. Bansal tried to bribe him, but an argument ensues, where Kabir shot D'Souza in a fit of rage and the accident was covered up.

Bansal realizes that Kabir is still a bratty kid and decides to enrol him into a military school. Following her grandfather's advice, Anushka turns the video over to their friend Rohan's father lawyer, Kriplani in order to ensure the children remain safe. However, Kriplani quietly returns it to Bansal and Rohan realizes that his father has given up the video and thus urges Zoya to reach Ajay Mehra. As the children hurry to reach Ajay, they are intercepted by Bansal's thugs. A chase ensues and Ajay saves the children, recovering the video. Riya takes the children to the hospital, but they are yet again abducted by Bansal's men. Ajay finds out that Anushka is his late girlfriend Varsha’s and his own daughter. Her grandfather had kept the secret to shield her from Ajay's past after Varsha’s death. Devastated, Kabir tortures the children until Bansal, tired of his son's tantrums, warns him away.

Bansal holds Anushka and releases the other children. He tells Ajay that his daughter will henceforth stay with Bansal in order to ensure the safety of Kabir. Bansal's mother objects, but Bansal, locked in moral conflict, waves her away. Bansal orders the Home Minister to arrest Ajay. Ajay overcomes the cops and mounts an attack on the Bansal mansion to rescue Anushka. After a fierce fight, Ajay rescues Bansal's family who gets trapped in the debris. Ajay then goes to the chopper landing, where he sees Kabir torturing Anushka and beats him up. He is about to kill him when Bansal pleadingly apologizes to Ajay and Anushka where he, along with Kabir surrenders to the police. Ajay and Anushka recover in the hospital surrounded by Rhea, and their friends.

== Cast ==
- Sunny Deol as Ajay Mehra
- Soha Ali Khan as Dr. Rhea – Ajay’s girlfriend
- Shivam Patil as Rohan Kriplani
- Aanchal Munjal as Anushka Mehra – Ajay and late Varsha’s daughter
- Diana Khan as Zoya Saigal
- Rishabh Arora as Varun / Fattu
- Om Puri as ACP Joe D'Souza
- Narendra Jha as Raj Bansal
- Manoj Joshi as Home Minister Kaka Saheb
- Tisca Chopra as Sheetal Bansal
- Yo Yo Honey Singh as Monkey Boy Villain
- Ruhanika Dhawan as Ananya Bansal
- Sachin Khedekar as Lawyer Sanjeev Kriplani
- Ramesh Deo as Kulkarni
- Srijitaa Ghosh as Renu
- Jiten Mukhi as Gajendra
- Hina Rahevar as Smita
- Komal Raj as Radha
- Farooq Saeed as Salim
- Anisha Hinduja as Salma
- Raymon Singh as Mamta Kriplani
- Nadira Babbar as Sita Bansal
- Abhilash Kumar as Kabir Bansal
- Zakir Hussain as Police Commissioner Ashraf Iqbal
- Satyajeet Puri as Al Noor
- Harsh Chhaya as Aditya Rajguru
- Siraj Ahlawat as DCP Saurabh Sinha
- Sushant Sharma as Arjun
- Suchinit Singh
- Ashish Tiwari as Trintera Tiwari
- Lakshya Handa as Vicky Oberoi
- Neha Khan
- Sebastien Vandenberghe as Troy

Meenakshi Seshadri, Raj Babbar, Moushumi Chatterjee, and Amrish Puri appear as Varsha Sahay, Ashok Mehra, Indu Mehra and Balwant Rai respectively from the archive footage from Ghayal (1990).

== Production ==
In 2013 producer Dharmendra expressed his interest to work on the sequel to 1990 film Ghayal, and actor Sunny Deol was supposed to direct the movie, with the title Ghayal Once Again.

== Music and soundtrack ==
The music for the film’s songs was composed by Shankar–Ehsaan–Loy and the lyrics of the songs were penned by Amitabh Bhattacharya. The background score of the movie was done by Vipin Mishra.

Ghayal Once Again

Soundtrack album by Shankar–Ehsaan–Loy
- Released: 29 December 2015
- Genre: Feature film soundtrack
- Language: Hindi
- Label: Zee Music Company

Shankar–Ehsaan–Loy chronology
Katyar Kaljat Ghusali (2015)	Ghayal Once Again (2015)	Mirzya (2016)

Track listing
No.	Title	Singer(s)	Length
1.	"Lapak Jhapak"	Armaan Malik, Siddharth Mahadevan, Yashita Sharma	4:15
2.	"Khuda Hai Tere Andar"	Arijit Singh	5:12
Total length:			9:27

== Box office ==
The film had grossed Rs 72.0 million on its first day of release and an estimated Rs 232.5 million by the end of its first weekend, according to film analyst Taran Adarsh.

== Sequel ==
After the release of this film, Sunny Deol expressed his interest to make a third part of this franchise.
