= Manoranjan TV =

Indian Hindi-language movie and entertainment channel

- Country: India
- Broadcast area: India
- Headquarters: New Delhi, Delhi, India

Programming
- Language: Hindi
- Picture format: 576i (SDTV)

Ownership
- Owner: Manoranjan TV Group Limited
- Sister channels: Manoranjan Movies; Khushboo Bangla; Manoranjan Grand; Manoranjan Prime

History
- Launched: 14 October 2010; 15 years ago

Manoranjan TV is an Indian Hindi-language entertainment and movie channel which was owned by Manoranjan TV Group Limited. Earlier, the channel aired Bollywood and Hindi-dubbed movies. Now it is an entertainment channel airing children's programming. In 2022, the channel launched content in Bhojpuri and in 2023, in Urdu.

== Programming ==
=== Current shows ===
- Fundaar
- Kissey Kahaniyan
- Chottu Dada
- Zabardast Kahaniyan
- Kissey Kahaniyan
- Majedaar Kahaniyan

Animated

- The Jungle Book
- Chacha Bhatija
- Oggy and the Cockroaches

=== Former programming ===
- Majedaar Kahaniyan

Animated

- Watch Cars
- Supa Strikas
- Grizzy & the Lemmings
- Gormiti
- Super King
- Mighty Raju
- Vir: The Robot Boy
- Peter Pan
