= Khushboo Bangla =

Indian Bengali Movie Channel

- Logo used since 2017
- Country: India
- Broadcast area: India
- Headquarters: Kolkata, West Bengal, India

Programming
- Language: Bangla
- Picture format: 576i (SDTV)

Ownership
- Owner: Manoranjan TV Group Limited
- Sister channels: Manoranjan TV; Manoranjan Movies; Manoranjan Grand; Manoranjan Prime

History
- Launched: 1 August 2012; 13 years ago
- Former names: Khushboo TV (2012-2017)

Khushboo Bangla is an Indian Bengali language television channel. It started to broadcast on 14 October 2017 as the Bangla language cable channel in India. The channel mostly airs content intended for family and coming-of-age generations. Its main audience attraction is Bangla movies. This channel has also aired a Bangladeshi television drama series.

== Current shows ==
- Hasir Khazhana
- Bangladeshi Movies

== Former shows ==
- Crime Watch
- Bangla Golpo
- Funcho
- Mowgli
- Fun Unlimited
- Golpo Jhuri
- Adventure Stories
- Magical Stories
- Chacha Bhatija( Bengali dubbed)
