= Dishum TV =

Indian Bhojpuri Entertainment Channel

- Country: India
- Broadcast area: India
- Network: Dishum TV
- Headquarters: New Delhi, Delhi, India

Programming
- Language: Bhojpuri
- Picture format: 576i (SDTV)

Ownership
- Owner: Dishum Broadcasting Pvt. Ltd.

History
- Launched: 15 August 2017

Dishum TV is an Indian Bhojpuri-language general entertainment free-to-air (FTA) television channel owned and operated by Dishum Broadcasting Pvt Ltd. An entertainment company based in Mumbai, Maharashtra, the channel airs content including drama, daily soap, films, devotional songs, mythological shows, music, and shows featuring Bollywood celebrities.

The channel broadcast via INSAT4A.

== Programming ==
- Ghayal Khiladi
- 440 Volt
- Ghar Pahucha Da Devi Maiya
- Kesariya Balam Aavo Hamare Des
- Ganesh Leela
- Kahani Chandrakanta Ki
- Woh Rehne Waali Mehlon Ki
- Jaga Sadhu Bhor Bhayil
- Bhajie Prabhu Ka Naam
- Draupadi
- Prem Leela
- Mai ke Mahima
- Jai Maa Aadi Shakti
- Ghare Ayili Saton Bahiniya
- Dance Ka Tadka
- Kismat Connection

== List of movies ==
- Ashok (2006)
- Saugandh (2006 film)
- Maiya Rakhiha Senurwa Aabad (2006)
- Ek Jwalamukhi (2007)
- Main Hoon King (2008)
- Tohare Karan Gail Bhainsiya Paani Mein (2009)
- Pariwar (2009 film)
- Maar Deb Goli Kehu Na Boli (2010)
- Najariya Tohse Lagi (2010)
- Pyar Karela Himmat Chahi (2011)
- Jab Kehu Dil Mein Sama Jala (2012)
- Kaalia (2013 film)
- Panchayat (2013 film) (2013)
- Chutki Bhar Sindoor (2013)
- Mamta Ka Karz (2013)
- Veer Balwan (2013)
- Jaan Lebu Ka Ho (2014)
- Ek Laila Teen Chhaila (2014)
- Rowdy Rani (2014)
- Maine Dil Tujko Diya (2014 film)
- Adalat (2014 film)
- Hathkadi (2014 film)
- Bihari Rikshawala
- Khaki Vardiwala (2015)
- Ishqbaaz (2015 film)
- Kajra Mohabbat Wala (2015)
- Maai Ke Karz (2015)
- Muqabla (2016 film)
- Baliya Ke Dabangai (2016)
- Love Aur Rajneeti (2016)
- Dulha Hindustani (2017)
- Jitab Hum Pyar Ke Baazi (2017)
- Maai Ke Ancharwa Babuji Ke Dulaar (2017)
- Mukhtar (2017 film)
- Chana Jor Garam (2018 film)
- Mohabbat Ki Saughat (2018)
- Love Ke Liye Kuchh Bhi Karenge (2018)

== See also ==
- List of Bhojpuri-language television channels
