= Robot Boy =

Robot Boy may refer to:

- Robotboy, a British-French animated television show
- ViR: The Robot Boy, an Indian animated show
- "Robot Boy", a track on the 2010 Linkin Park album A Thousand Suns
