= Aamby Valley City =

Master-planned private township in Maharashtra, India

- Town
- Location in Maharashtra, India
- Coordinates: 18.60939°N 73.38725°E
- Country: India
- State: Maharashtra
- City: Pune

Government
  - Testing: Sahara India Pariwar

Area
  - Total: 43 km^{2} (17 sq mi)
- Elevation: 700 m (2,300 ft)

Languages
- Time zone: UTC+5:30 (IST)
- Vehicle registration: MH 12, MH 14
- Nearest city: Lonavala
- Website: www.aambyvalley.com

Aamby Valley City is a township developed by the Sahara India Pariwar on the outskirts of Pune, India.

== Construction and connectivity ==
The city, founded in 2006, is spread over 4,300 hectares (10,600 acres) of hilly terrain in the Sahyadri hills of the Western Ghats. It is about 23 km (14 mi) from Lonavala, 87 km (54 mi) from the city of Pune and 120 km (75 mi) from the city Mumbai. The township is connected by road from Lonavala. The township has an airstrip that stopped functioning in late 2016. It has an average annual rainfall of 4,000 mm (160 in) from June to September.

Marketed to India's super-rich, the city was developed in five phases. It was designed and master planned by Gruen–Bobby Mukherji & Associates in the year 2003. It is almost entirely owned and operated by Sahara and related entities. It has between 600–800 luxury bungalows priced between ₹5 crore to ₹20 crore.

Three large man made lakes have been created by constructing dams. The largest lake is 1.5 km in length. The city is spread on 4,300 hectares (10,600 acres) and ten villages near Lonavala and boasts of an airstrip, helipads, shopping complexes, 104 hectares (256 acres) PGA approved 18-hole golf course, captive power plant, two small dams, an international school, and a hospital. The township has multiple luxury restaurants and a lagoon with an artificial beach adjacent to the replica of Varanasi ghat for cultural programs.

In late 2016, the golf course and the airstrip stopped functioning.

== Financial troubles ==
Since its founding the city has faced variety of financial and legal troubles for having received investments of ₹62,643 crore from deposits collected by four Sahara cooperative societies allegedly in violation of norms. Per Sahara group, the Aamby Valley project was valued at about ₹1 trillion ($14.76 billion) in 2014, citing a Knight Frank India report. This high valuation claimed by Sahara was in contrast with the weakened financial profile of the project. According to Securities and Exchange Board of India, Aamby Valley posted an after-tax profit of ₹90 million in the 12 months ended March 2013 compared to ₹694 million in the July 2011-March 2012 period. In 2018–19, the Aamby Valley project made a consolidated loss of ₹994 crore compared to a loss of ₹1,133 crore in the previous year. Its total income came down to ₹958 crore in 2018-19 from ₹1,530 crore a year ago.

In 2016, the Tehsildar of Mulshi, a local revenue authority, sealed the gated township for non-payment of taxes. It was reopened the same day after Sahara group made a payment of ₹2.53 crore.

=== Sales proceedings ===
In April 2017, the Supreme Court of India ordered the auction of Aamby Valley project to recoup ₹14,000 crore the company owes to duped investors. The court set a seemingly high reserve price of ₹37,000 crore, which led to limited interest and only two bids and no buyers in the end. In July 2018, after failing to attract prospective buyers, the supreme court deferred the auction and allowed to city to be under control of the Sahara Parivar. In 2019, the court decided to continue with the auction.

In January 2020, the supreme court appointed a receiver to manage Aamby Valley and to explore a new auction.

== Sponsorship ==
In 2014, Aamby Valley inked a 4-year $14 million sponsorship deal with Bangladesh national cricket team. Without citing any reasons, the Bangladesh Cricket Board ended the contract 15 months before it was scheduled to end.

== See also ==
- Lavasa
- Planned city
- Western Ghats
- Sahara India Pariwar investor fraud case
