= B4U Bhojpuri =

Bhojpuri television channel

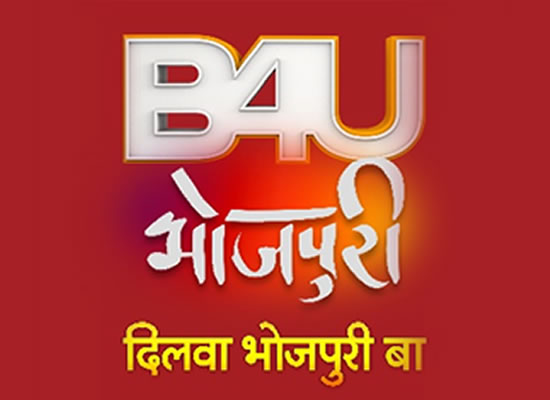
- Logo used since 2019
- Country: India
- Headquarters: Mumbai, Maharashtra

Programming
- Language: Bhojpuri

Ownership
- Owner: B4U Network
- Sister channels: List: B4U Music B4U Movies B4U Kadak Dhamaka Movies B4U B4U Plus B4U Aflam

History
- Launched: 15 May 2019; 7 years ago

Availability

Streaming media
- YouTube: Worldwide

B4U Bhojpuri is an Indian Bhojpuri language movie TV channel owned by B4U Network.

They show newly released Bhojpuri and Bhojpuri dubbed movies as well as films produced by B4U Motion Pictures. This channel broadcasts mainly in South Asia.

== Current broadcast ==
- Bhajan Sagar

== Former broadcast ==
- Kawariya Bole Bam Bam

== See also ==
- B4U Motion Pictures
- B4U Music
- B4U (network)
- List of Bhojpuri-language television channels
