= Shree Ganesh =

Indian mythological television series

- Genre: Mythology
- Created by: Vikas Kapoor
- Based on: Lord Ganesh
- Written by: Vikas Kapoor/Lt. Darshan Laad
- Directed by: Dheeraj Kumar
- Starring: See below
- Country of origin: India
- Original language: Hindi
- No. of seasons: 1
- No. of episodes: 144

Production
- Producer: Zuby Kochhar
- Running time: 45 min
- Production company: Creative Eye Limited

Original release
- Network: Sony Entertainment Television
- Release: 1 October 2000 – 29 June 2003

Shree Ganesh is an Indian Hindi-language mythological television series that aired on Sony TV from 1 October 2000 and ended on 29 June 2003. Directed by Dheeraj Kumar, it follows the story of the Hindu god Ganesha, portrayed by Jagesh Mukati.

== Plot ==
The show follows the story of Lord Shiva and Parvati's son Ganesha, who is considered as the remover of obstacles.

== Cast ==
- Jagesh Mukati as Sarvashaktimaan Vishwa Ko Vardaan Denewale Paramdev Shree Mahaganesh
- Gayatri Jayaraman as Devi Adishakti / (Devi Shakti)
- Sunil Sharma as Mahadev Bhagwan Bholenath Shivashankar
- Priyanka Puthran as Shakti Swaroopa Devi Parvati / Nav Durga
- Sandeep Mohan as Shristi Ke Palanhar Jagatpalak Bhagwan Shree Hari Vishnu
- Pallavi Nayak as Vishnupriya Mahadevi Devi Lakshmi
- Shital Thakkar as Vishnupriya Mahadevi Devi Lakshmi
- Arup Pal as Shristi Ke Rachnakar Parampita Brahmadeva
- Shailey Chowdhary as Devi Saraswati
- Surbhi Tiwari as Shakti Swaroopa Devi Sati (Sati)
- Sunil Nagar as Prithvi Samrat Prajapati Maharaj Daksha (Daksh) / Maharaj Bheemsena husband of Maharani Kamala, and mother of unknown son
- Sameer Dharmadhikari as Swarg Samrat Swargaadipati Devraj Indra
- Shilpa Kataria as Maharani Devi Shachi, who is the wife of Devraj Indra
- Sanjay Swaraj as Devrishi Narada
- Radhakrishna Dutta as Prajapati Maharishi Kashyapa, who is the husband of both Devi Aditi and Devi Diti
- Kirti Singh as Dakshputri Daittyamata Devi Diti, first wife of Kashyapa, mother of Daityaraj Vajranga
- Shweta Rastogi as Dakshputri Devmata Devi Aditi, second wife of Kashyapa, mother of devraj indra and grahpati suryadeva
- Nimai Bali as Swayambhu Samrat Assurraj Mahabali Tārakāsura
- Raman Khatri as Assurraj Bhayasura who turned to Bhaktraj Dayasura
- Rajesh Shringarpore as Maharaj Nala / Rajkumar Kishan
- Swati Anand as Maharani Damayanti / Villager woman Dhanno
- Firdaus Mevawala as Daittyaguru Shukracharya
- Deepak Jethi as Daityaraj Vajranga / Assurraj Tarakaksha
- Rakesh Pandey (actor) | Rakesh Pandey as Maharaja Mahipati
- Kishori Shahane Vij as Prithvi Maharani Devi Verni
- Veena Sharma as Varāṅgī, the wife of Vajranga
- Hansa Singh as Devi Shambhuki
- Vaquar Shaikh as Maharaj Chitrāngada
- Seema Pandey as Maharani Indumati
- Vinod Kapoor as Maharaj Bheema
- Sujata Thakkar as Maharani Indumati's Dasi (personal servant)
- Qasim Ali as Pushpaka / Amar Vardaani Assuraj Sindhu Daittya
- Amit Pachori as Swarg Samrat Swargaadipati Devraj Indra
- Brownie Parashar as Daittyaraj Kamalasura / Maharaj Jaysena
- Shraddha Sharma as Devi Keerti, the first wife of Sashivahana, and souten of Devi Sashiprabha
- Santosh Kumar Shukla as Chandarketu / Veerasura is also a twin brother, husband of Vijaya and husband of Phulmati
- Sanjeev Siddharth as Daittya Senapati Pralambhasura of Tarakasura
- Kulraj Bedi as Daittya Senapati Krambhasura / Vignasura who turned to Bhaktraj Vignasura later
- Ashok Kumar Balkrishnan as Gauriputra Mangalmurti Bhagwan Shree Mahaganesh and other avatar incarnations
- Gajendra Chauhan as Maharaj Parvatraj Himalaya
- Surekha as Maharani Mainavati
- Sandeep Mehta as Devrishi Narada
- Yashodhan Rana as Kamadeva
- Navneet Chaddha as Maharishi Parashara / Villager man Premgana / Sudharma
- Madhu Bharti as Mata Prithvi
- Annapurna Vittal Bhairi as Maharani Sashiprabha / Maharani Ugra
- Santosh as Udhava (servant) of Daityaraj Narantak and Devantak
- Lavnish as Uddhara (servant) of Daityaraj Narantaka and Devantaka
- Nachiketa as Rakshashni Virja (servant) of Daityaraj Narantaka and Devantaka
- Adi Irani as Maharishi Bhagiratha, childhood friend of Villager man Sadashiva
- Pradeep Rawat (actor)|Pradeep Rawat as Daityaraj Krodhasura turned to Bhaktraj Bodhasura
- Anuradha Sawant as Maharishi Parashar's wife Vatshala / Villager woman Rewa / Devi Dratichi
- Anil Yadhav as Maharishi Parshurama
- Mahendra Ghule as Daityaraj Devantaka / Madhu
- Govind Khatri as Daityaraj Narantaka / Daityaraj Lobhasura turned Ganesh Das
- Mulraj Rajda as Villager man Sadashiva
- Maleeka R Ghai as Rajkumari Mallika
- Navneen Bawa as Villager man Somnatha
- Shweta Shinde as Devi Nilima
- Mitul Bhattacharya as Maharani Sushma / Ganesh Bhakt Kaveri; later, her husband Premraj calls her "Premraj Ki Prema"
- Bhakti Narula as Devi Vihanga, the second wife of Daittyaraj Sindhu also known as Sindhu Daittya by Daittyaguru Shukracharya
- Alka as Villager girl Mandakini (Manda)
- Sunil Bob as Varundeva
- Manoj Verma as Maharaj Ripudaman, who is the husband of Maharani Vasundhara and father of Chakradhara
- Sunila Karambekar as Maharani Vasundhara, the wife of Maharaj Ripudaman and mother of Chakradhara
- Shailendra Srivastav (TV actor) / Shailendra Srivastav as Daittyaraj Tripurasura, who was later killed by Bhagwan Shivashankar
- Unknown actor as Devguru Brihaspati
- Kshama Raj as Maharani Shrimaya / Villager woman Anandi, who is the mother of Bhaktraj Balal Bhagat
- Ayush Pandey as Maharishi Griashamartha, son of Maharishi Rukshmangada and Devi Mukunda
- Jaya Mathur as Devi Mukunda, the wife of Maharishi Rukshmangada and mother of Maharishi Griashamartha
- Meenakshi Gupta as Villager woman Sulochana, daughter of Villager woman Shrikala and Villager man Sadashiva, wife of Premgana and niece of ganesh bhakt kaveri and sister of Shivadutta who is the divya avataar of Bhagwan Ganesha

== Production ==
We did a lot of research, stuck to the scriptures, and made the show with a lot of passion. We worked closely with the research scholars from various states of India. We spent almost two years on the research before Zuby and I decided to make a show.

— Dheeraj Kumar

== Reception ==
The Tribune stated, "It triumphs due to its slick production values and neatly packaged anecdotes."

As in April 2001, it was garnering a rating of 1.9 TVR in India.

== Syndication ==
Star Plus, DD National, ABZY Cool acquired the broadcast rights for the series in June 2020, during the nationwide coronavirus lockdown, as a substitute to its original programming.
