= Upendra Rai =

Indian journalist and writer (born 1972)

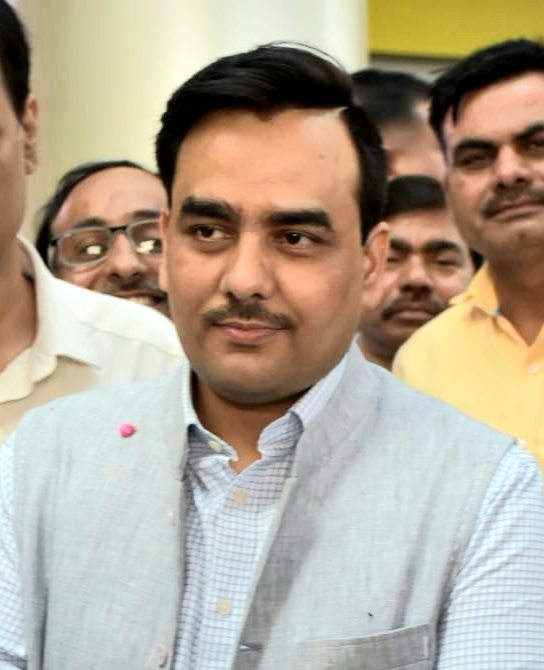
- Upendra Rai in 2016
- Born: Upendra Rai; 16 January 1982 (age 44); Sherpur, Ghazipur, India
- Education: University of Lucknow; SVKM's NMIMS
- Occupations: CEO & Editor-in-Chief, Sahara News Network
- Years active: 1997–present
- Spouse(s): Dr. Rachana, Professor, JIIT, M.Sc., IIT Roorkee, Ph.D., IIT Bombay

Upendra Rai (born 16 January 1982) is an Indian journalist and writer. He is chairman and managing director and editor-in-chief of Bharat Express News Network. Earlier he was working as CEO and editor-in-chief at Sahara India Media. He has worked as CEO and editor-in-chief at Tehelka. Earlier he has also been with Sahara News Network as its Group CEO and editor-in-chief, looking after the functioning of Sahara Samay Channel along with Samay UP/ Uttarakhand, Samay Bihar/Jharkhand, Samay MP/CG, Samay Rajasthan, Aalami Samay and Rashtriya Sahara Hindi Daily. He resigned from Sahara News Network in June 2016 and started his own media house, 'The Printlines Media Group' as its chairman and editor-in-chief.

== Early life ==
Upendra Rai was born in the village Sherpur, Ghazipur. He got his early education at village Sherpur & Inter College Mohammadabad, Ghazipur, Uttar Pradesh and completed his graduation from University of Lucknow. He moved to Mumbai to pursue his career as Chief of Bureau of Rashtriya Sahara. In Mumbai he got Master of Business Administration from SVKM's NMIMS.

== Career ==
He started his career as a correspondent in the year 1997 with Sahara News Network while pursuing his graduation at University of Lucknow. In October 2002 he joined Star News (Now ABP News) then in August 2004 he joined Network 18 where he worked as the member of launching team of CNBC Awaaz/CNBC TV18. He later joined Star News again (renamed ABP News) in October 2005 as principal correspondent, where he did path-breaking stories related to taxation, business, politics and entertainment. In November 2009 he moved to Sahara News Network as editor and news director. However, he left Sahara News Network in 2016 and started working as CEO and editor-in-chief of Tehelka. In September 2019 he came back to the fold of Sahara News Network again as its senior advisor.

Upendra Rai did many big stories while working with Star News (ABP News). He unearthed dmat account scandal in October 2005. Likewise, he broke the story of stud farm owner Hasan Ali in January 2007, which resulted in government agencies actions on Ali.

== Hastakshep ==
Upendra Rai hosted a show Hastakshep on Sahara Samay. Hastakshep played a bridge between government and society discussing the issues affecting the masses. Hastakshep was launched 35 years back as Saturday supplement of Rashtiya Sahara where renowned analyst of economy, polity, current affairs and other subjects contribute with their well researched and articulated write-ups. Each edition of Hastakshep carries a special topic where scholars of various school of thought contribute with theirs different opinions and analysis.

In February 2020 Sahara News Network launched a T.V. show Hastakshep keeping with same taste, tradition and format. Hastakshep has recently been in news for its series of interviews through skype and mojo, abiding the sop of COVID-19 lock down.

== Awards ==
- Star Achiever Award in 2006
- Star Patrakar Ratna Award in 2007
- Indian Television Academy Awards for best reporting among Hindi news channels, 2007
- Lions Gold Awards by Lions Clubs International, Mumbai, 2008
- Lions Gold Awards by Lions Clubs International, Mumbai, 2009
- Bharosa Patrakar Samman with Javed Akhtar, 2010
- National Integration Award, Hubli, Karnataka, December 2010
- National Excellence Award, World Book of Records, London, 2019
