= ATN B4U Movies =

B4U Movies
- Country: Canada
- Broadcast area: National
- Headquarters: Markham, Ontario

Programming
- Picture format: 480i (SDTV)

Ownership
- Owner: Asian Television Network (name licensed by B4U)
- Sister channels: ATN B4U Music

History
- Launched: March 2001 (Pay service); June 17, 2012 (specialty service)

Links
- Website: ATN B4U Movies

ATN B4U Movies is a Canadian Category B specialty channel owned by Asian Television Network International. It broadcasts programming from B4U Movies and Canadian content. Programming consists of Bollywood movies and other Bollywood film based programming in Hindi.

== History ==
Original B4U Movies logo

ATN B4U Movies was originally launched as a pay service in March 2001 using the following license. However, on September 25, 2012, this license was revoked at ATN's request. The channel subsequently re-launched as a regular specialty service on June 17, 2012, under the following license: ATN Hindi Movie Channel 3.
