= Sahara India Pariwar investor fraud case =

Fraud case in India, started 2010

The Sahara -SEBI case is the case of the issuance of Optionally Fully Convertible Debentures issued by the two companies of Sahara India Pariwar to which Securities and Exchange Board of India had claimed its jurisdiction and objected on why Sahara has not taken permission from it.

== Details ==
Sahara has claimed that the said bonds are hybrid product, thus do not come under the jurisdiction of SEBI, instead is governed by Registrar of Companies (ROC) under Ministry of Corporate Affairs, from which the two companies of Sahara have already taken permission and submitted the red herring prospectus with ROC before issuing the bonds.

SEBI in return ordered Sahara's two companies to stop issuing the said bonds and return money to investors. Sahara contested the case in various courts which eventually came to Supreme Court of India. On 14 June 2012, (during the final hearing of the case), the group had provided details of its financials up to 30 April 2012. While the court reserved its order, Sahara claims that it has already paid to 93% of the investors and discharged its OFCD liability to the tune of Rs. 23,500 crores and only around Rs. 2,260.69 crores are left against which Sahara has already deposited more than Rs. 12,000 crore which has with interest swelled to Rs. 16,000 crore. By 31 August 2012 the date of Supreme Court order, the group repaid majority of its OFCD investors between May the last date of hearing and by 30 August 2012 the final order. Since these repayments have not been taken into consideration, Sahara maintains that any money paid now will obviously mean a double payment towards one liability.

Furthermore, the market regulator SEBI advertised four times in more than 144 newspapers to ask the investors of Sahara to refund the money. And since August 2012 enforcement directorate has only refunded Rs. 64 crore to the investors while it has received Rs. 16,000 crore from Sahara. In October 2014, a shocking revelation was made when only around 4,600 investors in two Sahara group companies had come forward to claim refunds from the Securities and Exchange Board of India (Sebi), which had asked those who had purchased bonds issued by the entities to claim their money. This gave a valid point to Sahara's argument before courts that it had repaid most of the investors who had come forward to claim the investment which they had made in bonds issued by two group companies.

Reports also suggested that between the time that SEBI first initiated the inquiry four years ago and Roy's eventual detention and it is to note that till today there is not a single charge against him, there has not been a single instance of an investor in either of the two Sahara firms under watch actually filing a police complaint or going to court. While Sahara has been asked to refund the money to a special Sebi account under a Supreme Court-monitored repayment process, the group has been saying it has already refunded more than 98 per cent of the amount directly to investors and the proof for the same have been given to Sebi.

The case itself comprises big numbers such as collection of over Rs. 24,000 crore from three crore individuals, while once in 2013 Sahara sent 127 trucks containing 31,669 cartons full of over three crore application forms and two crore redemption vouchers to Sebi office. Apparently, this had resulted into a huge traffic jam on outskirts of Mumbai, where the regulator is headquartered. SEBI on the other hand because the trucks reached after office hours SEBI rejected the second batch of files, which as per Sahara contained 25% of the investor information.

It is also been reported that Sahara has paid Rs. 725.97 crore as TDS (tax deducted at source) to the Income Tax Departments on the interest which along with investment was repaid to 95 percent of the investors, between 2009–10 and 2012–13. The income tax authorities had found that the beneficiary investors were existent and accordingly confirmed the repayments made in those particular years. One of Sahara's arguments in the apex court revolves around the fact that if one government body has found investors, why can't the other.

The group stated that SEBI will be directed to start the verification of the documents of Sahara's investors, which are already provided to them by Sahara India Pariwar. Despite the double payment for single liability, Sahara India has been continuously depositing money of around Rs. 22,500 crore (including interest earned) in Sahara-Sebi account.

Subrata Roy has rejected allegations of misconduct and has alleged Indian National Congress of witch hunt due to his opposition to Sonia Gandhi over becoming the country's prime minister.

== Timeline of events ==
The unravelling of this case started in 2010 and it was in process in the Supreme Court of India as of 2016.

- November 2010 - Securities and Exchange Board of India barred Sahara India Pariwar chief Subrata Roy and two of its companies – Sahara India Real Estate Corp (SIREC) and Sahara Housing Investment Corp (SHIC) - from raising money from the public as they had raised several thousand crores through optionally fully convertible debentures (OFCDs) that SEBI deemed illegal.
- December 2010 - Sahara appealed in the Allahabad High Court, which ordered SEBI not to take any action until a court order is passed.
- January 2011 - Delhi High Court issued a warrant against Roy and four other officials of the group on a complaint that it deceived investors in a proposed housing project of Rs. 25,000 crore.
- February 2011 - Delhi High Court stays proceedings against Roy and four other officials of the group on a complaint that it deceived investors in a proposed housing project.
- May 2011 - Supreme Court of India asked Sahara India Real Estate (SIREC) to furnish the format of the application for its optionally fully convertible debenture (OFCD) scheme and a list of accredited agents that raised money on the company's behalf.
- June 2011 - SEBI ordered Sahara firms to immediately refund the money collected through its sale of OFCDs.
- October 2011 - Securities Appellate Tribunal (SAT), set up by the Supreme Court, ordered two unlisted Sahara group companies to refund within six weeks about Rs. 17,656.53 crore with 15% interest, which it had raised through OFCDs.
- November 2011 - Sahara India Pariwar moved the Supreme Court against SAT's order and the Supreme Court stayed the SAT order, and asked the two companies to refund Rs. 17,400 crores to their investors and asked the details and liabilities of the companies.
- January 2012 - Supreme Court gives three weeks time to Sahara India Pariwar to choose between options to return investments made by public in its OFCD scheme. Sahara to either to give sufficient bank guarantee or attach properties worth the amount raised through OFCDs.
- May 2012 - Supreme Court is informed by senior counsel Fali Nariman of Sahara India Real Estate Corp that SEBI could not have taken up this issue of Sahara Group of companies raising funds through OFCD as there was no complaint from any investor.
- June 2012 - SEBI informed the Supreme Court that the real estate division of Sahara India Pariwar had no right to mobilize Rs. 27,000 crore from investors through OFCD without complying to the norms of the market regulator - SEBI.
- August 2012 - Supreme Court directed Sahara India Real Estate Corporation Ltd. (SIRECL) and the Sahara Housing Investment Corporation Ltd. (SHICL) to refund over Rs. 24,400 crore to its investors.
- February 2014 - Roy arrested by Uttar Pradesh police for failure to appear before the Supreme Court.
- March 2014 - Roy, along with two other directors of Sahara, sent to Tihar jail.
- March 2015 - Supreme Court stated that the total dues from Sahara have gone up to Rs 40,000 crore with the accretion of interest.
- July 2015 - SEBI cancelled the licence of Sahara's mutual fund business.
- May 2016 - Roy released on parole from Tihar jail.
- January 2021- Delhi High Court allowed Sahara Credit Co-Operative Society and Saharayn Universal Multipurpose Society to continue their operations by staying the orders of central registrar of cooperative societies and the Department of Agriculture, Cooperation and Farmers Welfare. While giving relief to Sahara Group, the divisional bench also noted that a payment of Rs. 17,487.82 crore has already been made.
