= Firangi (TV channel) =

- Country: India
- Broadcast area: International
- Headquarters: Mumbai, Maharashtra

Programming
- Language: Hindi
- Picture format: 576i (SDTV)

Ownership
- Owner: Sahara One Media & Entertainment Limited
- Sister channels: Sahara One; Filmy; Sahara Samay; Sahara Samay Bihar Jharkhand; Sahara Samay Madhya Pradesh Chhattisgarh; Sahara Samay Rajasthan; Sahara Samay Uttar Pradesh Uttarakhand; Aalami Samay

History
- Launched: 25 February 2008; 18 years ago

Availability

Streaming media
- MX Player

Firangi is a Hindi-language entertainment channel that was owned by Sahara India Pariwar. In its early years, this channel telecast some international shows and movies that were dubbed in the Hindi language. The channel now airs reruns of old Sahara One series, similar to Star Utsav.

== History ==
Sahara announced in August 2007 that it was going to launch a "world TV" channel named Firangi, appointing Rajeev Chakrabarti as its business head. The channel was scheduled to air television series from around the world, including popular telenovelas, all dubbed in Hindi, in order to attract adult audiences with content different to what was mainly shown on mainstream Hindi language entertainment channels. In October, Sahara attended MIPCOM to buy content for the new channel.

On February 9, 2008, Firangi announced its launch date (February 25). At the time, 40% of locals watched dubbed foreign content. Its content was imported from several European and Latin American countries, as well as Israel. Its competitor, UTV's Bindass, was also engaged in the broadcast of dubbed foreign series. The surge in Hindi dubs of international series came as the result of surveys which perceived Star Plus and Zee TV's Hindi soaps as "dull and boring". Firangi had agreements with Televisa, SevenOne, Marathon Media, Dou Media, Telemundo and TV Globo (providing the channel with Pages of Life and America). Days ahead of launch, Firangi unveiled its initial slate of series. The channel was broadcasting its prime time content in two consecutive slots: the new episodes between 5 and 8pm for housewives and the repeats between 9pm and 12am for viewers who came home from work.

== Former shows ==
=== Dubbed series ===
- Second Chance
- Lalola
- Dolmen
- Love Is In The Air

=== Acquired series ===
- Malini Iyer
- Comedy Champions
- Shubh Mangal Savdhaan
- Hi! Padosi... Kaun Hai Doshi?
- Hit Music
- Dhoom
- MBKAKM

=== Telenovela ===
- Marimar
- Maria la del Barrio
- La Usurpadora
- La Intrusa
- Rubi
- Destilando Amor
- Esmeralda
- Carita De Amor
- Rosa Salvaje
- Topacio
- Gotita de Amor
- Amor Real
- Vivan la ninos
