= Bollywood Ka Boss =

- Presented by: Boman Irani
- Original language: Hindi

Original release
- Network: Sahara Filmy

Bollywood Ka Boss is an Indian quiz show on the Sahara Filmy television channel hosted by Hindi film actor Boman Irani.

== Finalists ==
1. Ashutosh Mordekar (Mumbai)
2. Svetta Mohla (New Delhi)
3. Ravi Krishna (Hyderabad)
4. Sameen (Mumbai)
5. Mohit Garodia (Chennai)
6. Ayushman Mitra (Kolkata)
7. Harsh (Delhi)
8. Nikhil Bhosle (Pune)
9. Ameya Samant (Mumbai)
10. Amit Pareek (Indore)
