= Comedy Champions =

Indian TV series

- Genre: Comedy, Reality
- Country of origin: India
- Original language: Hindi
- No. of seasons: 2

Original release
- Network: Sahara One
- Release: 15 March 2008

Comedy Champions is a comedy show that started airing at 15 March 2008 on Sahara One.

== Concept ==
The show consists of many popular Indian and Pakistani comedians who perform standup comedy for the audience. The show has a new look and feel with fresh sets of jokes that have never been showcased before.

Host

- Karishma Tanna

Contestants

- Sunil Pal
- Kuldeep Dubey
- Rajeev Nigam
- Rajeev Thakur
- Parveez Siddiqui
- Kashif Khan
- Rauf Lala
- Shakeel Siddiqui
- Amir Rambo
- Aslam Imran
