= B4U Movies =

Indian movie digital TV channel

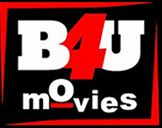
- Country: India
- Broadcast area: Worldwide
- Headquarters: Mumbai, Maharashtra, India (and international versions)

Programming
- Language: Hindi
- Picture format: SDTV

Ownership
- Owner: B4U
- Sister channels: B4U Music; B4U Kadak; B4U Bhojpuri

History
- Launched: 26 August 1999; 26 years ago

Links
- Website: b4umovies.in b4umovies.us

Availability

Terrestrial
- Oqaab (Afghanistan): Channel 33
- DStv (Sub-Saharan Africa): Channel 451; Channel 12102 (HD)
- Zuku TV (Kenya): Channel 908
- Tata Play: Channel 385; Channel 384 (HD)
- Airtel Digital TV: Channel 236 (SD) (HD) soon
- DD Free Dish: LCN 12
- Cambodian DTH UHD: Channel 62

Streaming media
- Sling TV: Internet Protocol television

B4U Movies is an Indian television channel broadcasting a mixture of classic and contemporary Hindi films. It is part of the B4U network and began in 1999.

B4U Movies is available on more than 8 different satellites, in more than 100 countries around the world. There are 4 different versions (feeds) of the channel available: for South Asia, North America, Middle East, and Europe. Each version of the channel produces a quantity of local programming which reflects the culture and tastes of the local population of the Indian Diaspora.

== History ==
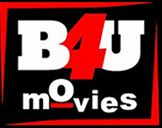
First logo

B4U Movies was promoted by Eros International, the world's biggest distributor of Bollywood films. When first launched in 1999, it became the world's first 24-hour digital channel. The channel offered four three-hour Hindi films a day and would air new movies between three and six months after cinema release.

As of October 2000, B4U had 170,000 subscribers across 6 continents worldwide.

In India, the channel has been free to air since 2017.

== Programming ==
Other than movies, one such program (only shown on the South Asian version of B4U movies) is a talent contest for young actors, directors and screenwriters aged 7–15. The show concluded with the 4 finalists of the contest having their debut films premiered on the channel.

== See also ==
- ATN B4U Movies
- B4U Films
