= B4U Music =

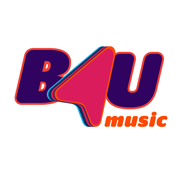
- Country: India; United Kingdom; Qatar
- Broadcast area: International
- Headquarters: Mumbai, Maharashtra, India

Programming
- Languages: Hindi & English
- Picture format: 16:9 576i SDTV

Ownership
- Owner: B4U Network Limited
- Sister channels: B4U Movies; B4U Kadak; B4U Bhojpuri

History
- Launched: 6 May 2000; 26 years ago

Links
- Website: b4umusic.in

Availability

Terrestrial
- Oqaab (Afghanistan): Channel 60
- Cambodian DTH UHD (Cambodia): Channel 76

Streaming media
- Virgin TV Anywhere: Watch live (UK only)
- Sling TV: Internet Protocol television
- DD Free Dish: LCN 63
- Airtel digital TV: LCN 486

Logo used from 2000 to 2013.

Logo used from 2013 to 2014.

B4U Music is a free to air music television channel owned by the B4U Network. The channel broadcasts a mixture of contemporary Bollywood, Indipop, Bhangra and international music. The channel later currently airs all songs in Bollywood, Indipop, Punjabi, Bhojpuri, Haryanvi, UK Punjabi, Rajasthani, Qawwalis, Pahari, K-pop, Sufi, Rock, English and Ghazals in past and present

== History ==
The channel began broadcasting in 2000 becoming the second B4U channel after B4U Movies. There are now four different versions of the channel being broadcast in Europe, North America, Africa, the Middle East and South Asia. Each feed produces a quantity of local programming which reflects the culture and tastes of the local population of the Indian diaspora.

In Qatar the channel launched in 2009 and closed in 2019.

== Programming ==
Programs include celebrity interviews, artist profiles, concerts and chart rundowns, as well as video request shows.

Since 2008, the yearly UK Asian Music Awards have been produced and broadcast by the channel.

== Ratings ==
B4U Music emerged as the No.1 Asian TV channel in UK ratings in January 2022.

== See also ==
- ATN B4U Music
