= Rishu Movies Bhojpuri =

Indian Bhojpuri movie channel

- Country: India
- Headquarters: Mumbai, Maharashtra

Programming
- Language(s): Bhojpuri

Ownership
- Owner: Captain Video Pvt Ltd

History
- Launched: 26 September 2021; 3 years ago

Rishu Movies Bhojpuri is a Bhojpuri language 24/7 movie channel owned by Captain Video Pvt Ltd. The channel shows Hindi movies dubbed in Bhojpuri.
