= Bharat Samachar =

Indian Hindi news channel

- Country: India
- Broadcast area: India
- Headquarters: Lucknow, Uttar Pradesh, India

Programming
- Language(s): Hindi
- Picture format: 576i (SDTV)

Ownership
- Owner: Time Today Media Network Private Limited

History
- Launched: June 2016; 8 years ago

Links
- Website: www.bharatsamachartv.in

Bharat Samachar, is an Indian Hindi-language 24-hour television news channel owned by Time Today Media Network Private Limited(d.b.a. Uttar Pradesh Television Limited) according to the MIB. The channel is headquartered in Lucknow, the capital city of Uttar Pradesh, India. The channel was relaunched in 2017 as a local Hindi news channel focusing Uttar Pradesh from Lucknow.

In addition to its operations in Uttar Pradesh, Bharat Samachar has expanded its coverage to the state of Uttarakhand.

== History ==
Bharat Samachar was launched in early 2017 as U.P.TV by Brajesh Misra, a journalist and media professional after resigning from the ETV Network. However, after the trademark-related issues, he collaborated with the company that was operating National Voice. After the end of the partnership, he relaunched the channel as Bharat Samachar.

== Leadership ==
Brajesh Misra serves as the Editor-in-Chief of Bharat Samachar, and managing director of UP Television Network Private Limited. leading the overall management and strategic initiatives of the channel. Virendra Singh holds the position of CEO, overseeing the channel's editorial direction and content.

== Programming ==
Bharat Samachar offers a wide range of programming that covers various aspects of news and current events. The channel features news bulletins, talk shows, debates, interviews, and documentaries. Some of the popular shows on Bharat Samachar include:

The Debate: Hosted by Brajesh Misra, The Debate brings together experts and analysts to discuss and debate pressing issues and current affairs. The show provides different perspectives on important topics and encourages informed discussions.

Power Center: Hosted by Virendra Singh, Power Center focuses on the power centres in politics, business, and society. The show examines the individuals and entities that hold significant influence and impact the course of events.

Cutting Chai: A light-hearted talk show that covers trending topics, entertainment news, and social media buzz. The show provides a mix of informative and entertaining content in a relaxed format.

== Controversies ==
=== Sting operation by Cobrapost ===
Under Operation 136: Part II released by Cobrapost on 25 May 2018, the Marketing and Sales Head along with the Editor-in-Chief and Owner of Bharat Samachar agreed to promote firebrand Hindutva leaders and attack the Bahujan Samaj Party, the Samajwadi Party and the Congress. The other media houses named in the undercover investigation include the Times of India, India Today, the Hindustan Times, Zee News, Network 18, Disney Star, Paytm, ABP News, Dainik Jagaran, Radio One, Red FM, Lokmat, ABN Andhra Jyothy, TV5, Dinamalar, Big FM, K News, India Voice, The New Indian Express, MVTV and Open magazine. The portal disclosed how the Bartaman and the Daikik Sambad declined to distribute content with religious undercurrent.

=== Income Tax Department raid ===
The Income Tax Department raided the premises of Bharat Samachar in July 2021. In a move that raised concerns over press freedom, the Income Tax Department conducted raids at multiple locations, including the premises of Bharat Samachar, as well as one of the largest Hindi media groups, Dainik Bhaskar. The raids carried out under the pretext of alleged "tax evasion," were strongly condemned by the Indian Journalists Union.

Ashok Gehlot, the former Chief Minister of Rajasthan, had criticised the Modi government, alleging that it cannot tolerate even the slightest criticism. He made these remarks in response to the raids conducted by the Income Tax Department on multiple media organisations, including Bharat Samachar and Dainik Bhaskar.

The timing of these raids, particularly in the aftermath of the second wave of the COVID-19 pandemic, has led to speculation about the authorities' intentions and their impact on press freedom. The Indian Journalists Union expressed apprehensions that the raids might be an attempt to stifle critical media voices and intimidate independent journalism.

Bharat Samachar, along with other affected media organisations, vehemently denied any wrongdoing and maintained that they have adhered to all legal and financial regulations. The outcomes of the income tax raids and the subsequent legal proceedings are yet to be determined.

The incident has sparked widespread discussions on the importance of protecting press freedom and ensuring the independence of media organisations in a democratic society. As per the department, ₹3 crore cash was seized and ₹200 crore unaccounted transactions were unearthed along with 15 shell companies for money laundering.
