= Surya Bhojpuri =

Indian Bhojpuri Entertainment Channel

- Country: India
- Broadcast area: India
- Network: Surya Network
- Headquarters: Noida, Uttar Pradesh, India

Programming
- Language: Bhojpuri
- Picture format: 576i (SDTV)

Ownership
- Owner: Surya Sagar Communication Pvt. Ltd.
- Sister channels: Surya Samachar; Surya Cinema

History
- Launched: 15 January 2020; 6 years ago
- Closed: 22 June 2021; 5 years ago

Surya Bhojpuri is a Bhojpuri language entertainment channel that was owned by Surya Sagar Entertainment Pvt Ltd.

In March 2021, Dish TV announced that it would no longer carry Surya Bhojpuri. Tata Sky also dropped the channel.

This channel closed & shutdown from June 22, 2021.

== Former shows ==
- Koyla
- Imtihaan
- Vishnupuran
- Khandhan
- Jai Hanuman
- Mircha Lagal
- Gana Tanatan
- Bhakti Ras
- Jap La Prabhu Ke Naam
- Bhakti Mein Shakti
- Sajal Mai Ke Darbar
- Hit Ba Fit Ba
- Bhojpuriya Beat
- Superhit Gaane Lagataar
- Rang Barse

== Sister channels ==
- Surya Samachar
- Surya Cinema

== See also ==
- List of Bhojpuri-language television channels
