= Bharat Express =

Hindi news channel

- Country: India
- Broadcast area: Indian subcontinent
- Network: Satellite and online
- Headquarters: Noida, India

Programming
- Language(s): Hindi

History
- Launched: 1 February 2023

Links
- Website: bharatexpress.com

Bharat Express is an Indian Hindi news channel. Its headquarters is in Noida, India. The Editor-in-Chief of Bharat Express is Upendra Rai, who was formerly the Chief Executive Officer and Editor-in-Chief of Sahara News Network.

== History ==
The Bharat Express news channel was launched on 1 February 2023.
