= Sahara–Birla Papers =

2013 documents leak

The Sahara-Birla Papers are computer printouts and diaries with purported details on money paid by Sahara Group and Aditya Birla Group to some of the ministers and judges in India.

== Raids ==
During its raids in 2013 and 2014, the CBI seized some diaries from two big Indian companies, Sahara Group and Aditya Birla Group. These diaries contained references of alleged payments made to leaders belonging to as many as 18 political parties including BJP, Congress, JDU, BJD etc.

== Alleged references to Modi ==
Among the recovered content were some entries mentioning "Gujarat CM" and "Ahmadabad Modiji". Citing these entries, on 21 December 2016, the opposition leader Rahul Gandhi alleged that Modi received cash bribes worth ₹65 crore (US$7.7 million) from Sahara Group and Aditya Birla Group when he was the chief minister of Gujarat.

=== Other leaders named ===
Various leaders were named in Sahara-Birla Papers :

- Shivraj Singh Chouhan
- Raman Singh
- Shaina NC
- Sheila Dixit
- Jayanthi Natarajan

== Supreme Court petition ==
In November 2016, advocate Prashant Bhushan filed a plea in the Supreme Court of India asking for investigation of the alleged bribe payments made to some senior public servants including Modi. On 25 November 2016, a Supreme Court bench of Justice JS Khehar and Justice Arun Kumar Mishra refused to order probe into the case stating that the material cited doesn't arouse its conscience. In next hearing on 11 January 2017, the new bench consisting the Justice Arun Mishra and Justice Amitava Roy dismissed the plea stating that the evidence provided was insufficient.

=== Reactions to dismissal ===
Later on, Justice Mishra was criticised by a section of advocates and activists for siding with the Modi government in multiple judgements during his tenure at the Supreme Court. The Economic and Political Weekly stated that the Supreme Court ruling had deadly implications and the case had rewritten a 145-year-old law. The Wire questioned the manner in which the Supreme Court buried the Sahara-Birla diaries' investigation.
