= Housefull Movies =

- Country: India
- Headquarters: Mumbai, Maharashtra, India

Programming
- Language: Hindi

Ownership
- Owner: Swami Films Entertainment Pvt Ltd
- Sister channels: Housefull Action; Multiplex; Movie Plus

History
- Launched: 1 September 2015; 10 years ago
- Closed: 17 August 2021; 4 years ago

Housefull Movies is an Indian cable and satellite 24-hour Hindi movie television channel that was owned by Swami Films Entertainment Pvt Ltd. The channel was launched on 1 September 2015 and replaced TV24 News, after the news channel was removed due to non-renewal of contract. The free-to-air channel faces stiff competition from the likes of Hindi movie channels, like Zee Cinema, SET Max, Star Gold and many more.

== See also ==
- Cinema TV
