= Box Cinema =

Indian Hindi movie channel

- Country: India
- Broadcast area: India
- Headquarters: Mumbai, Maharashtra

Programming
- Language: Hindi

Ownership
- Owner: Box Cinemedia Services Pvt Ltd

History
- Launched: 24 January 2019; 7 years ago
- Closed: 6 June 2022; 3 years ago
- Replaced by: Atrangii

Links
- Website: Official Website

Box Cinema was a free-to-air Indian Hindi movie channel that was owned by Box Cinemedia Services Pvt. Ltd. The channel shows Bollywood and South Indian dubbed movies.

== History ==
Box Cinemedia Services Pvt Ltd launched Box Cinema in January 2019. This channel shows Bollywood, Hollywood, and South Indian dubbed movies. It was replaced by Atrangii on 6 June 2022.
