= Aalami Samay =

Urdu language news television channel

Aalami Sahara عالمی سمے
- Country: India
- Broadcast area: India, Pakistan, United Arab Emirates, Saudi Arabia, United States
- Network: Sahara Natwork
- Headquarters: Hyderabad, Telangana, India

Programming
- Language: Urdu
- Picture format: 576i (SDTV)

Ownership
- Owner: Sahara India Pariwar Group
- Sister channels: Filmy; Firangi; Sahara Samay; Sahara Samay UP Uttarakhand; Sahara Samay MP Chhattisgarh; Sahara Samay Bihar Jharkhand

History
- Launched: 27 Dec 2010

Links
- Website: Sahara Samay

Availability

Terrestrial
- Dish TV: Channel No. 129

Streaming media
- Aalami Sahara Live: Watch Live

Aalami Sahara (Urdu :عالمی سمے) is an Urdu-language 24/7 news television channel, owned by Sahara India Pariwar. The channel is a free-to-air and launched on 27 December 2010. The channel is available across all major cable and DTH platforms as well as online.

== See also ==
- Sahara India Pariwar
- Sahara Samay Channel
- Sahara One
