= Filmy =

Indian movie channel

- Country: India
- Headquarters: Mumbai, Maharashtra

Ownership
- Owner: Sahara One Media and Entertainment Limited
- Key people: Sandeep Bhargava (Creator & CEO)
- Sister channels: Sahara One; Firangi; Sahara Samay; Sahara Samay Bihar Jharkhand; Sahara Samay Madhya Pradesh Chhattisgarh; Sahara Samay Rajasthan; Sahara Samay Uttar Pradesh Uttarakhand; Aalami Samay

History
- Launched: 12 February 2006

Links
- Website: www.myfilmy.com

Filmy was an Indian Hindi-language movie channel based in Mumbai, Maharashtra. It was owned by Sahara One Media & Entertainment Limited and was headed and launched by Sandeep Bhargava on 12 February 2006.

== Programs ==
In addition to telecasting Cinema, the channel also telecasted

- Aaj Ki Filmy Khabar
- Bathroom Singer
- Bollywood Ka Boss
- Comedy Champions
- Dhoom
- Filmy Hot Break
- Filmy Stock Exchange
- Hit Music
- MBKAKM
- Meri Bhains Ko Anda Kyon Maara?
- Rocky's 99
- The Jungle Book

== See also ==
- List of Indian television stations
- Filmy (Canada)
