= Kesariya Balam Aavo Hamare Des =

- Genre: Drama
- Written by: Reshma Khan
- Starring: See below
- Opening theme: "Kesariya Balam Aavo Hamare Des"
- Country of origin: India
- Original language: Hindi
- No. of seasons: 1
- No. of episodes: 423

Production
- Producer: Ajay Sinha
- Editor: Ajay Sinha
- Camera setup: Multi-camera
- Running time: Approx. 24 minutes

Original release
- Network: Sahara One
- Release: 16 November 2009 – 12 April 2011

Kesariya Balam Aavo Hamare Des is an Indian soap opera that aired on Sahara One, based on the story of a poor Rajput girl, Rukmini who struggles through life and fights with her destiny. The show was produced by Ajay Sinha.

== Plot ==
Rukmini a.k.a. Rukmi (Jaya Binju) lives with her father Madan Singh, step-mother Dhapu, younger half-sister Rasal (Toral Rasputra) and half-brother Gheesu. They are poor and struggle to make ends meet. Rukmi, in childhood, had saved Rasal from a fire and got one side of her face burned. Since then, she has been wearing a half veil so that the burn marks are not visible. Rukmi's scarred face acts as a hurdle in her acceptance by society.

On the other hand, there is Ranveer (Akshat Gupta), a painter and the son of the most affluent family in the area. He paints a picture of a girl — who looks exactly like Rukmi — from his imagination. One day he sees Rukmini and is stunned to know the girl he painted actually exists. He realizes he loves her and proposes to her. Rukmini wants to tell him the truth of her burned face but is unable to do so. She writes him a letter explaining everything. But Dhapu, who wants Rukmi to get married and leave home quickly, changes the letter. Rukmini thinks Ranveer knows the truth. They get married with the blessings of their families.

Ranveer, on the wedding night, lifts Rukmini's ghoonghat (veil) and sees her scars. He feels cheated and refuses to accept her as his wife. Ranveer's family wants to get him re-married. Madan Singh asks his younger daughter Rasal to marry Ranveer. Rasal, who is in love with a soldier named Vikram, agrees even though this means losing her love forever. After marriage, Ranveer and his family take a liking to Rasal; but Rukmini is treated like a domestic help. Some time later, Ranveer and Rasal fall in love with each other; they consummate their marriage and she gets pregnant. The entire family is happy; however, Rasal suffers a miscarriage. Later, a very drunk Ranveer forces himself upon Rukmi. She gets pregnant as a result but, for Rasal's sake, does not divulge who fathered the child. Eventually, Rasal gets to know the facts. She forgives Ranveer, as he was not in his senses when the incident happened. Rukmi loses her unborn child in an accident.

Ranveer's father was killed by his evil nephew Deep (Mahesh Shetty), who wanted to take over the family's assets. Deep, his mother and maternal uncle go on plotting against Ranveer, Rasal and Rukmi. Only Rukmi knows the truth, but nobody believes her. After some time, Deep attacks Ranveer, who falls off a cliff and is believed dead. Rasal learns that she is pregnant again. Ranveer is rescued by some hermits but loses his memory. He meets Rukmi at the hermitage where he is recovering. Rukmi does not tell him who he is, because Deep is still trying to kill him. Ranveer falls deeply in love with Rukmi and offers to marry her. When his family finds him at the hermitage, he insists on taking Rukmi home with him. Rasal and her in-laws start hating Rukmi because they think she has taken advantage of Ranveer's condition. Gheesu tells Ranveer all about his past life with Rukmi. Ranveer is filled with regret for having treated Rukmi badly and now gives her all due privileges as his wife.

Some time later, Rasal's former lover Vikram returns from war, having lost a leg. Ranveer proposes a marriage between Vikram and Rasal. Initially, everyone is outraged, but Ranveer convinces them all. Even Rasal, after great hesitation, agrees. Soon after Vikram and Rasal marry, she gives birth to her and Ranveer's son. Reluctantly, she leaves the baby boy with Rukmi and goes away with Vikram. The child is named Govind. Rukmi promises that she will never have any children of her own, so that Govind remains the sole centre of her attention. Four years later, Vikram and Rasal join Rukmi and Ranveer to celebrate Govind's birthday. The evil Deep tries to harm Ranveer and Govind. However, by now, Ranveer has recovered his memory and realized the truth about his cousin. He foils Deep's attempt. Deep is shot dead by his own father. Rasal and Dhapu ask for Rukmi's forgiveness. The families are happily reunited and Rukmi's patience is rewarded.

== Cast ==
- Jaya Binju as Rukmini; Ranveer's wife; Govind's adoptive mother
- Akshat Gupta as Ranveer; Rukmi's husband; Rasal's ex-husband; Govind's biological father
- Toral Rasputra as Rasal; Govind's biological mother; Ranveer's ex-wife
- Mukesh Solanki as Dr. Yash
- Mahesh Shetty as Deep
- Manini Mishra as Padma
- Nayan Bhatt as Grandmother
- Vandana Lalwani as Moomal
- Lalit Parimoo as Megh Singh
- Renuka Israni as Gayatri
- Tej Sapru as Bhanvar Singh
- Ansha Sayed as Dhumri
- Ashok Banthia as Mamaji
