= Studio N (TV channel) =

Indian Telugu-language television news channel

Studio N news
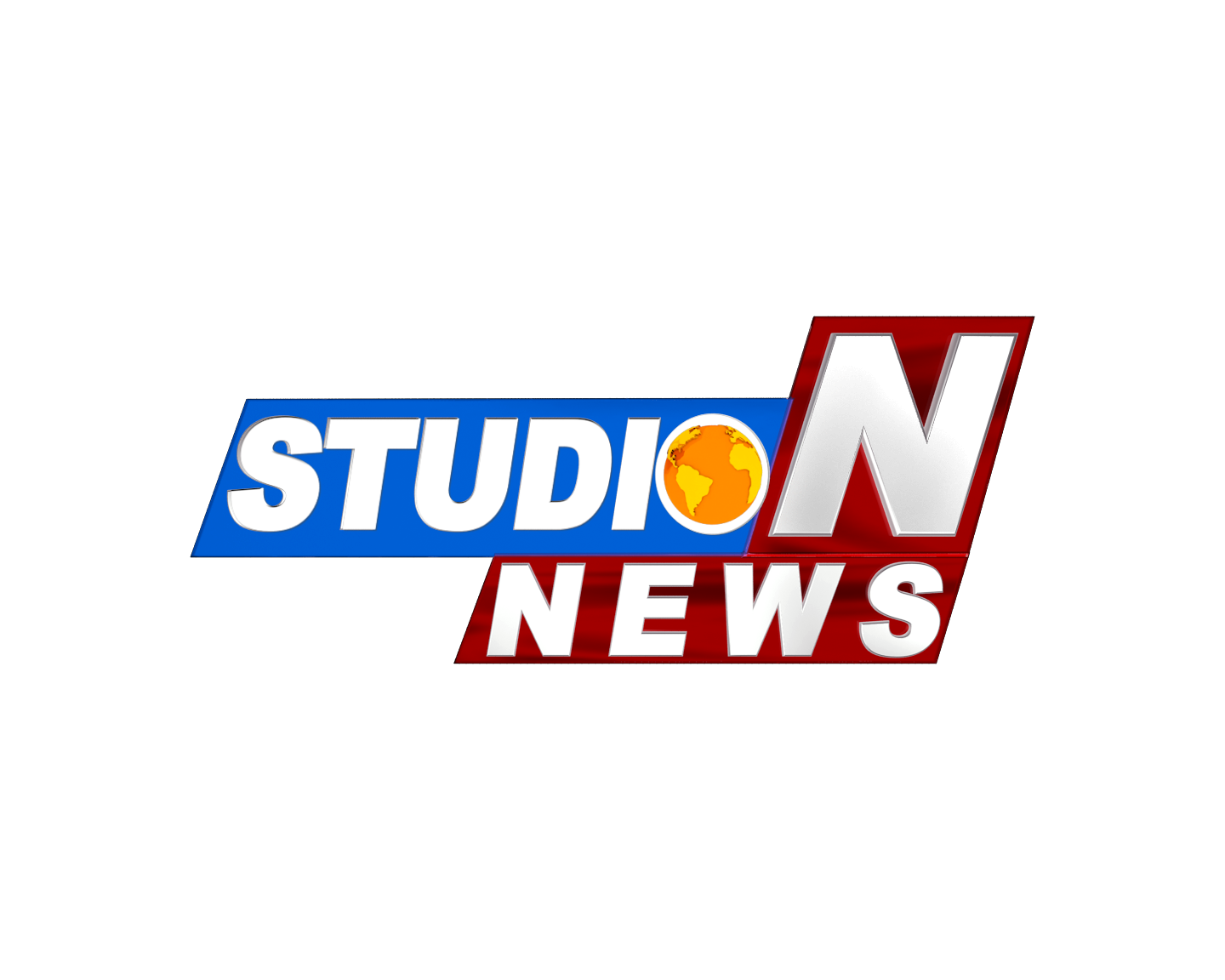
- Country: India
- Network: Studio N News
- Headquarters: Hyderabad, Telangana, India

Programming
- Language: Telugu
- Picture format: 16:9

Studio N is a 24-hour Telugu news channel from Narne group which is aired in Telugu States Telangana and Andhra Pradesh.

== History ==
Studio N news channel was launched by its Chairman Narne Srinivasa Rao who is the leader of YCP and a relative of TDP chairman N. Chandrababu Naidu. Jr.NTR married the one and only daughter of Narne Srinivasa Rao on 5 May 2011.

== Ownership ==
In 2014, Narne Srinivas Rao sold the Studio N business to godman and cult leader Kalki Bhagwan.
