= Oqaab =

National digital terrestrial television service in Afghanistan

Oqaab (Persian: عقاب, meaning "eagle") is the national digital terrestrial television (DTT) service in Afghanistan, operated by the privately owned Afghanistan Broadcasting System (ABS). The service rolled out in April 2015 starting in Kabul and has been expanding to other cities and regions in the country, as ABS has been investing in the necessary infrastructure. It broadcasts currently 65 local and international TV channels (all free-to-air) in the DVB-T2 standard. In the upcoming future the international FTA channels will be replaced by a Pay TV offer.
