= Abzy Cool =

Indian Hindi TV channel

ABZY Cool
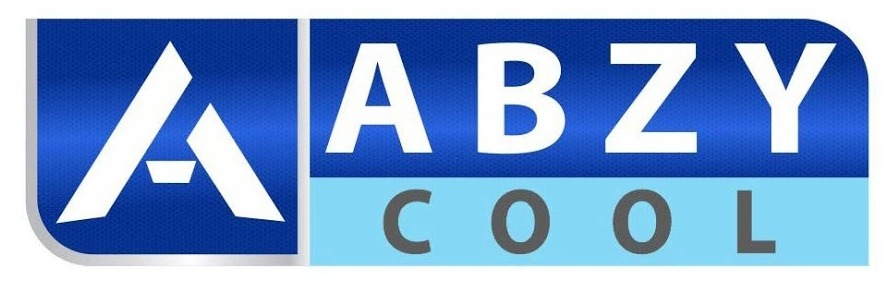
- Country: India
- Broadcast area: India
- Headquarters: Mumbai, Maharashtra

Programming
- Language: Hindi
- Picture format: 576i (SDTV)

Ownership
- Owner: Skystar Entertainment Pvt Ltd
- Sister channels: Abzy Movies; Abzy Dhakad

History
- Launched: 3 January 2018; 8 years ago
- Closed: 20 June 2024; 2 years ago
- Former names: Sky Star Bangla

Availability

Terrestrial
- DD Free Dish: LCN 109
- Airtel digital TV: LCN 144

Abzy Cool is a Hindi language movie channel that is owned by Skystar Entertainment Pvt Ltd. It was launched as a movie channel and later converted into an entertainment channel; it has since been relaunched once again as a movie channel.

== Former shows ==
- Aurat Teri Yehi Kahani
- Jap Tap Vrat
- Crime Stop
- Pyar Mein Savdhaan
- Mahima Maa Jagdambe Ki
- Shree Ganesh
- Daravni Kahani
- Om Namah Shivay

== Associated channels ==

Two related channels owned by Skystar Entertainment are:

Abzy Dhakad, a Bhojpuri language entertainment channel. Launched on 1 April 2019, the channel was formerly known as Sky Star Telugu.

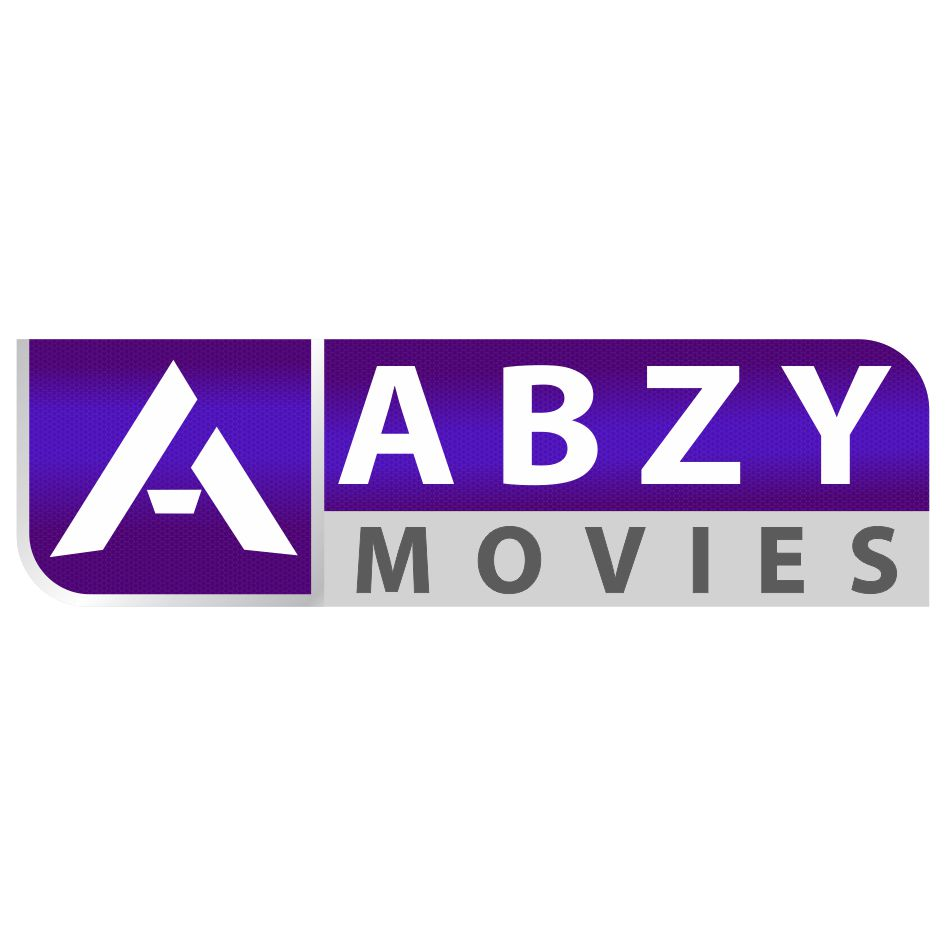

Abzy Movies, a Hindi language movie channel. Launched as Skystar Movies on 1 March 2014, it became Abzy Movies in April 2019.
