= List of programmes broadcast by Hungama TV =

This is a list of television programmes that are airing on Hungama TV in India.

== Current programming ==
- Bhaiyyaji Balwan
- Pokémon
- Selfie With Bajrangi
- Supa Strikas
- The Daltons
- The Gutsy Frog
- Tsurupika Hagemaru
- Upin & Ipin

== Former programming ==
=== Live-action ===
- Are You Afraid of the Dark?
- Backyard Science
- Chooha Mantar
- Colgate Muskurahatein
- Door Door Doorbeen
- Dum Dum
- Dharam Veer
- Full Toss
- Fungama
- Gol Gol Gulam
- Hatim
- Hero – Bhakti Hi Shakti Hai
- Hip Hip Hurray
- Hungama Fungama
- Kaarthika
- Kabhi Hero Kabhi Zero
- Kaun Anadi Kaun Khiladi
- Khabdoo Bigdoo
- Kya Mujhse Dosti Karoge
- Loomba
- Majooba Ka Ajooba
- Mr. Funtoosh
- Ninja Warrior
- Noddy Aur Daddy
- Paowan
- Poochne Bhi Do Yaaron
- Power Rangers Dino Thunder
- Power Rangers Lightspeed Rescue
- Power Rangers Ninja Storm
- Power Rangers Operation Overdrive
- Power Rangers RPM
- Power Rangers S.P.D.
- Power Rangers Wild Force
- Sanya
- Shaka Laka Boom Boom
- Shisha — Kahani Ek Raaz Ki
- Telematch
- Tiger
- Veer
- Zoran

=== Animated series ===
- Arthur
- Being Ian
- Beyblade
- Blacky the Funny Dog
- Bolek and Lolek
- BoBoiBoy
- Bola Kampung
- Boyster
- Bunty Aur Billy
- Chacha Bhatija
- Chai Chai
- Chimpui
- Detective Conan
- Digimon Xros Wars
- Doraemon
- The Eena Meena Deeka Chase Comedy Show
- Fifi and the Flowertots
- Fireman Sam
- Freaktown
- The Genie Family
- Gigant Big Shot Tsukasa
- Grami's Circus Show
- Harry & Bunnie
- Hum Chik Bum
- Inspector Chingum
- Jay Jay the Jet Plane
- KochiKame
- Lunar Jim
- Luv Kushh
- Martin Morning
- Ninjaboy Rantaro
- Ojarumaru
- Osomatsu-kun
- P5 - Pandavas 5
- Peep and the Big Wide World
- Pororo the Little Penguin
- Robotan
- Rolling with the Ronks!
- Shuriken School
- Slugterra
- Sonic X
- Space Goofs
- Supa Strikas
- Tensai Bakabon
- Tokyo Pig
- Ultimate Book of Spells
- Ultra B
- ViR: The Robot Boy
- Yu-Gi-Oh!

== Films ==
=== Chacha Bhatija films ===
S. No	Name	Premiere
1	Chacha Bhatija Khazane Ki Khoj	13 August 2017
2	Chacha Bhatija Golmaal Hai Bhai Sab Golmaal Hai	19 November 2017

=== Fatak Patak films ===
S. No	Name	Premiere
1	Fatak Patak: Sheru Aur Alienoid Gabru	17 September 2017
2	Fatak Patak: Sheru Aur Eagon Ka Aakraman	24 September 2017
3	Fatak Patak: Sheru Aur Titan Taapu Ka Rahasya	1 October 2017
4	Fatak Patak: Sheru Aur Baaku Ka Kala Saya	8 October 2017
