= B4U (TV channel) =

Indian TV channel

- B4U: The Digital Entertainment Channel
- Country: India
- Broadcast area: India
- Network: B4U Network
- Headquarters: New Delhi & Mumbai

Programming
- Language: Hindi
- Picture format: 576i (SDTV)

Ownership
- Owner: B4U Multimedia International Limited
- Sister channels: B4U Movies; B4U Music; B4U Aflam; B4U Plus; B4U Kadak; B4U Bhojpuri

History
- Launched: 3 September 2000
- Closed: 27 October 2001
- Replaced by: B4U Movies

B4U, also known as B4U TV, was an Indian television satellite channel, launched on 3 September 2000. The B4U network was created and originally owned by Kishore Lulla, Bharat Shah, and Gokul Binani.

Programming consisted of family dramas, talk shows, comedies, and shows starring Bollywood celebrities. The channel closed in 2001 replaced by B4U Movies.

== Programming ==
The following is a list of programmes that were broadcast by B4U TV at the time it was on-air. Some of these shows have also been re-aired on other Indian television channels.

Year	Serial	Cast	Total Number Of Episodes	Director	Genre
2000–2001	Tanhaiyaan	Anju Mahendru, Mohan Bhandari, Shama Deshpande, Radhika Menon, Natasha Sinha, Rajeev Paul, Naresh Suri, Gauri Karnik, Poonam Narula, Kanchan Mirchandani, Rajeev Gupta, Anita Wahi, Shishir Sharma, Saroj Bhargav, Balvinder Singh, Gayatri, Sunil Dhawan, Veena Kapoor, Rohit Bakshi, Madhu Amli, Sahil Chaddha, Vivek Mushran, Ravee Gupta, Anant Jog	42	Chitrath	Drama
2000–2001	Sukanya	Rupali Ganguly, Shishir Sharma, Gauri Karnik, Anju Mahendru, Sushmita Daan, Rakesh Paul, R. S. Chopra, Dash Saxena, Manav Kaul, Hiten Tejwani, Hussain Kuwajerwala, Rohit Bakshi	150	Sanjay Surkar; Ravi Raj	Drama
2000–2001	Khushi	Mohan Joshi, Lillete Dubey, Sangeeta Ghosh, Aarati Murjhani, Kamalakar Sontakke, Seema Bhargav, Sujata Vaishnav, Neha Pendse, Gargi Patil, Radhika Menon, Siraj Khan, Pawan Malhotra, Mandeep Bhandar, Romi Jaspal, Abhay Chopra, Anita Wahi, Vinod Raut, Mitul Bhattacharya, Vijay Anand, S. M. Zaheer, Sarosh Khan, Vandana Sajnani, Madhumalati Kapoor, Shamal	36	Lekh Tandon	Drama

- Anupamaa
- Apne Paraye
- Bahuraniyaan
- Club 10
- Dahshat
- Double Sawari
- In Conversation with Zeenat
- Kinare Miltey Nahin
- Manthan
- Papa
- Kahaani Nahi.... Jeevan Hai
- Karz Pichhle Janam Ka
- Rehnuma
- Rishta Kachche Dhaagon Kaa
- Saas Pe Sava Saas
- Sangharsh
- Star Bite
- Thoda Sa Gum Thodi Khushi
