= Sahara One =

Indian television channel

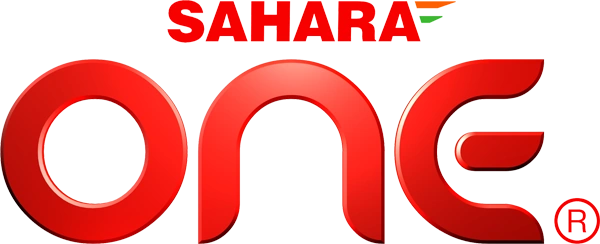
- Country: India
- Broadcast area: International
- Headquarters: Mumbai, Maharastra, India

Ownership
- Owner: Sahara One Media & Entertainment Limited
- Key people: Sandeep Bhargava (CEO)
- Sister channels: Filmy; Firangi; Sahara Samay; Sahara Samay Bihar Jharkhand; Sahara Samay Madhya Pradesh Chhattisgarh; Sahara Samay Rajasthan; Sahara Samay Uttar Pradesh Uttarakhand; Aalami Samay

History
- Launched: 28 March 2000; 26 years ago

Availability

Terrestrial
- DVB-T2 (India): Check local frequencies

Sahara One is an Indian Hindi general entertainment channel based in New Delhi. It is operated by Sahara India Pariwar.

== History ==
Sahara One was launched as Sahara TV on 28 March 2000, which later was renamed as Sahara Manoranjan in April 2003. To compete with other channels and attract more audience, the channel once again changed its name to Sahara One on 10 October 2004 under the leadership of Sandeep Bhargava.

The channel launched in the United States in 2005 on EchoStar along with the sister channel Filmy, also launched and headed by Sandeep Bhargava.

== Programming ==
The channel provides a mix of fiction and non-fiction entertainment shows, events, dramas, mythological series, reality shows, kids programming, thrillers, feature films and film-based programmes. Some of the most successful shows to date include Shubh Mangal Savadhan, Woh Rehne Waali Mehlon Ki, Ek Chutki Aasman, Kituu Sabb Jaantii Hai, Ganesh Leela, Kucchh Pal Saath Tumhara, Hare Kkaanch Ki Choodiyaan, Raat Hone Ko Hai, Hukum Mere Aaka, Aavishkar Ek Rakshak, Chacha Chaudhary, Prratima (based on the Bengali novel, "Protima", written by Tara Shankar Bandopadhyay), Shorr, Suno...Har Dil Kuch Kehta Hai, Sati - Satya ki Shakti and Zaara (TV series).

It broadcast the cartoon series Just Kids!, one of the most watched kids show of that time, hosted by Yash Pathak.

It also has broadcast television shows with Bollywood celebrities in the main roles such as Sridevi in Malini Iyer, Karisma Kapoor in Karishma - The Miracles of Destiny, Raveena Tandon in Sahib Biwi Gulam and Hema Malini in Kamini Damini.
