= List of news television channels =

News channels around the world

== General news channels ==
=== Africa ===
Network	Country	Owner	Language
Africa 24	Africa		French and English
Africanews	Africa	Euronews SA	English and French
Presse Africaine	Africa		French and English
AL24 News	Algeria		English, French and Arabic
Echourouk News	Algeria	Echourouk Group	Arabic and French
Ennahar TV	Algeria	Ennahar Group	Arabic, French and Berber
TV3	Algeria	EPTV	Arabic
TPA Notícias	Angola	TPA	Portuguese
BTV News	Botswana	BTV	English
CRTV News Channel	Cameroon	CRTV	English and French
Dash TV News	Cameroon	Dash Media	English
Tchad 24	Chad		French and Arabic
Alghad TV	Egypt		Arabic
Al-Qahera News	Egypt	United Media Services	Arabic
Extra News	Egypt	CBC	Arabic
Nile News	Egypt	National Media Authority	Arabic
Nile TV	Egypt	National Media Authority	English and French
ETV News	Ethiopia	EBC	Oromo
Joy News	Ghana		English
Bnews1	Kenya		English and Swahili
KTN News Kenya	Kenya	KTN	English and Swahili
Africable	Mali		French
Medi1 TV	Morocco	CDG Invest	Arabic and French
STV Notícias	Mozambique	Grupo Soico	Portuguese
Channels TV	Nigeria		English
News Central TV	Nigeria	News Central Media Limited	English
NTA News 24	Nigeria	NTA	English
TVC News	Nigeria	TVC Communications	English
eNCA	South Africa	eMedia Investments	English
Newzroom Afrika	South Africa		English
SABC News	South Africa	SABC	English
ZBC News	Zimbabwe	ZBC	English

=== Americas ===
Network	Country	Owner	Language
+Perfil	Argentina	Editorial Perfil	Spanish
A24	Argentina	Grupo América	Spanish
Argentina/12	Argentina	Grupo Octubre	Spanish
C5N	Argentina	Grupo Indalo	Spanish
Canal 26	Argentina	Telecentro	Spanish
Crónica TV	Argentina	Grupo Olmos	Spanish
DNews	Argentina, Chile, Colombia, Ecuador, Peru, Uruguay	Vrio Corp., Torneos	Spanish
El Destape TV	Argentina	Talar Producciones S.A.	Spanish
LN +	Argentina	Grupo La Nación	Spanish
Telefe noticias en vivo	Argentina	Grupo Televisión Litoral (Grupo Telefe)	Spanish
TN	Argentina	Clarín Group, Artear	Spanish
24/7 TV	Bolivia	Grupo 24/7	Spanish
ED24	Bolivia	Grupo El Deber	Spanish
Posdata TV	Bolivia		Spanish
BandNews TV	Brazil	Grupo Bandeirantes de Comunicação	Portuguese
CNN Brazil	Brazil	Novus Mídia	Portuguese
GloboNews	Brazil	Grupo Globo	Portuguese
Jovem Pan News	Brazil	Grupo Jovem Pan	Portuguese
Record News	Brazil	Grupo Record	Portuguese
RIT Notícias	Brazil	Fundação Internacional de Comunicação	Portuguese
SBT News	Brazil	Grupo Silvio Santos	Portuguese
CBC News	Canada	CBC	English
CBC News Live: BC	Canada	CBC	English
CBC News Live: Calgary	Canada	CBC	English
CBC News Live: Edmonton	Canada	CBC	English
CBC News Live: Manitoba	Canada	CBC	English
CBC News Live: Montreal	Canada	CBC	English
CBC News Live: New Brunswick	Canada	CBC	English
CBC News Live: NL	Canada	CBC	English
CBC News Live: North	Canada	CBC	English and Cree
CBC News Live: Nova Scotia	Canada	CBC	English
CBC News Live: Ottawa	Canada	CBC	English
CBC News Live: PEI	Canada	CBC	English
CBC News Live: Quebec	Canada	CBC	English
CBC News Live: Saskatchewan	Canada	CBC	English
CBC News Live: Toronto	Canada	CBC	English
CBC News Network	Canada	CBC	English
CityNews 24/7	Canada	Rogers Sports & Media	English
CP24	Canada	Bell Media	English
CTV News	Canada	Bell Media	English
CTV News Channel	Canada	Bell Media	English
Global News 24/7	Canada	Corus Entertainment	English
Global News: BC 1	Canada	Corus Entertainment	English
Ici RDI	Canada	CBC	French
LCN	Canada	Groupe TVA	French
Radio Canada Info	Canada	CBC	French
The News Forum	Canada	The News Forum Inc.	English
Agricultura TV	Chile	Sociedad Nacional de Agricultura	Spanish
Canal 24 Horas	Chile	TVN	Spanish
Canal CHV Noticias	Chile	Vytal Group	Spanish
CHV Noticias 24/7	Chile	Vytal Group	Spanish
CNN Chile	Chile	Carey Media Holdings	Spanish
Meganoticias Ahora	Chile	Bethia (Megamedia)	Spanish
T13 en vivo	Chile	Grupo Luksic	Spanish
Cablenoticias	Colombia	Global Media	Spanish
Noticias Caracol en vivo	Colombia	Valorem (Caracol Television S.A.)	Spanish
NTN24	Colombia	Organización Ardila Lülle (Grupo RCN)	Spanish
RCN Noticias en vivo	Colombia	Organización Ardila Lülle (Grupo RCN)	Spanish
Canal Caribe	Cuba	ICRT	Spanish
CDN	Dominican Republic	Banco Popular Dominicano	Spanish
24/7 Noticias	Ecuador		Spanish
TN23	Guatemala	Albavisión	Spanish
TSi	Honduras	Corporación Televicentro	Spanish
adn Noticias	Mexico	TV Azteca	Spanish all news programs and English but one Saturday news program.
Excélsior TV	Mexico	Grupo Imagen	Spanish
Heraldo Televisión	Mexico	Grupo Andrade	Spanish
Milenio Televisión	Mexico	Grupo Multimedios	Spanish
N+ Foro	Mexico	TelevisaUnivision	Spanish
Canal 4 Multinoticias	Nicaragua		Spanish
ECO	Panama	Corporación Medcom	Spanish
C9N	Paraguay	Albavisión	Spanish
Ñandutí TV	Paraguay	Radio Ñandutí Diario Digital	Spanish
Noticias PY	Paraguay	Grupo Vierci	Spanish
RCC	Paraguay	Red Chaqueña de comunicaciones	Spanish
ATV+	Peru	Albavisión	Spanish
Canal N	Peru	América Multimedia	Spanish
Latina Noticias en vivo Ahora	Peru	Vytal Group	Spanish
PBO Digital	Peru	4 Hearts Inc S.A.	Spanish
RPP TV	Peru	Grupo RPP	Spanish
TV Perú Noticias	Peru	IRTP	Spanish
ABC News Live	United States	Disney Entertainment Television	English
Blaze Live	United States	Blaze Media	English
CBS News 24/7	United States	Skydance	English
CBN News Channel	United States	CBN	English
Cheddar News	United States	Cheddar Inc.	English
CNN	United States	Skydance	English
CNN en Español	United States	Skydance	Spanish
CNN Headlines	United States	Skydance	English
CNN Noticias	United States	Skydance	Spanish
CNN International	United States	Skydance	English
Estrella News	United States	MediaCo	Spanish
Fox News	United States	Fox Corporation	English
Free Speech TV	United States	Public Communicators Inc.	English
HLN	United States	Skydance	English
Link TV	United States	Public Media Group of Southern California	English
LiveNOW from FOX	United States	Fox Corporation	English
MS NOW	United States	Versant	English
NBC News Now	United States	NBCUniversal	English
News 12 Networks	United States	Optimum Communications	English
Newsmax TV	United States	Newsmax	English
Newsmax 2	United States	Newsmax	English
NewsNation	United States	Nexstar Media Group	English
NEWSnet	United States	Bridge Media Networks	English
Noticias Telemundo Ahora	United States	NBCUniversal	Spanish
N+ Univision 24/7	United States	TelevisaUnivision	Spanish
One America News	United States	Herring Networks	English
Real America's Voice	United States	Performance One Media	English
Salem News Channel	United States		English
Scripps News	United States	E. W. Scripps Company	English
Spectrum News	United States	Charter Communications	English
TYT Network	United States	The Young Turks	English
VOA TV	United States	Broadcasting Board of Governors	English (VOA currently broadcasts news in 45 languages)
Globovisión	Venezuela		Spanish
Noticias Venevisión en vivo	Venezuela	Grupo Cisneros (Cisneros Media)	Spanish
Telesur	Venezuela	SiBCI	Spanish
UN24	Venezuela	Grupo Últimas Noticias	Spanish
VTV	Venezuela	SiBCI	Spanish

=== Asia–Pacific ===
Network	Country	Owner	Language
Ariana News	Afghanistan		Dari and Pashto
TOLOnews	Afghanistan	MOBY Group	Dari, Pashto and English
ABC News	Australia	Australian Broadcasting Corporation	English
News24	Australia, New Zealand	News Corp Australia	English
News24 World	Australia	News Corp Australia	English
ATN News	Bangladesh	Multimedia Production Company	Bengali
BTV News	Bangladesh	Government of Bangladesh	Bengali
Channel 24	Bangladesh	Times Media Limited	Bengali
DBC News	Bangladesh	Dhaka Bangla Media and Communication Limited	Bengali
Desh TV	Bangladesh	Desh Television Limited	Bengali
Ekattor TV	Bangladesh	Meghna Group of Industries	Bengali
Independent Television	Bangladesh	BEXIMCO	Bengali
Jamuna Television	Bangladesh	Jamuna Group	Bengali
News 24	Bangladesh	East West Media Group	Bengali
Somoy TV	Bangladesh	City Group	Bengali
Bayon News TV	Cambodia	Bayon High Media System	Khmer
CNC	Cambodia		Khmer
AHTV-5	China	Anhui Television	Chinese and English
BRTV-9	China	BRTV	Chinese
CCTV-13	China	China Central Television	Chinese
CDTV-1	China	Chengdu Radio & Television	Chinese
CDTV-5	China	Chengdu Radio & Television	Chinese
CGTN	China	China Central Television	English
CGTN America	China	China Central Television	English
CGTN Africa	China	China Central Television	English
CGTN Arabic	China	China Central Television	Arabic
CGTN French	China	China Central Television	French
CGTN Russian	China	China Central Television	Russian
CGTN Spanish	China	China Central Television	Spanish
CNC Chinese	China	CNC	Chinese
CNC World	China	CNC	English
CQTV-2	China	Chongqing Broadcasting Group	Chinese
FJTV-4	China	Fujian Radio Film and TV Group	Chinese
GDTV-5	China	Guangdong Radio and Television	Chinese (Standard Chinese and Cantonese)
GXTV-6	China	Guangxi Radio and Television	Chinese and Zhuang
HNTV-5	China	Hainan Broadcasting Group	Chinese
HBTV-7	China	Hubei Radio & Television Station	Chinese
HLJTV-5	China	Heilongjiang Broadcasting Television	Chinese
HNTV-6	China	Henan Broadcasting System	Chinese
Jiangsu News Channel	China	Jiangsu Broadcasting Corporation	Chinese and English
JXTV-7	China	Jiangxi Radio and Television	Chinese
SCTV-4	China	Sichuan Radio and Television	Chinese
SDTV-8	China	Shandong Radio and Television	Chinese
STV	China	SMG	Chinese (Standard Chinese and Shanghainese) and Japanese
SXBC-1	China	Shaanxi Broadcasting Corporation	Chinese
TJTV-1	China	Tianjin Television and Radio Station	Chinese
ZTV-7	China	Zhejiang Media Group	Chinese and English
RTHK TV35	Hong Kong	RTHK	English
HOY 78	Hong Kong	I-Cable HOY Limited	Chinese (Cantonese)
now News	Hong Kong	PCCW	Chinese (Cantonese)
Phoenix InfoNews Channel	Hong Kong	Phoenix Television	Chinese
TVB News Channel	Hong Kong	TVB	Chinese (Cantonese)
Aaj Tak	India	Living Media Group	Hindi
Aalami Samay	India	Sahara One Media & Entertainment Limited	Urdu
ABP Ananda	India	ABP Group	Bengali
ABP Asmita	India	ABP Group	Gujarati
ABP Desam	India	ABP Group	Bengali
ABP Ganga	India	ABP Group	Hindi
ABP Live	India	ABP Group	Hindi
ABP Majha	India	ABP Group	Marathi
ABP Nadu	India	ABP Group	Tamil
ABP News	India	ABP Group	Hindi
ABP Sanjha	India	ABP Group	Punjabi
Argus News	India	Argus Media	Odia
Asianet News	India	Asianet News Network	Malayalam
Asianet Suvarna News	India	Asianet News Network	Kannada
Bharat24	India	Live News India Network Private Limited	Hindi
Bharat Express	India		Hindi
CNN-News18	India	Network18 Group	English
DD News	India	Prasar Bharati	Hindi
DD India	India	Prasar Bharati	English
DY 365	India		Assamese
ETV Andhra Pradesh	India	ETV Network	Telugu
ETV Telangana	India	ETV Network	Telugu
Focus Bangla	India		Bengali
Focus TV	India		Hindi
Ganga News	India	Ganga News Network	Hindi
Good News Today	India	Living Media Group	Hindi
Gujarat Samachar	India	Lok Prakashan Limited	Gujarati
Hornbill TV	India	Pure Entertainment Group	English; Nagamese
In Goa News	India		Marathi, Konkani and English
India Ahead	India	Andhra Prabha Media Group	English
India News	India	ITV Network	Hindi
India News Gujarat	India	ITV Network	Gujarati
India News Haryana	India	ITV Network	Hindi
India News Madhya Pradesh Chhattisgarh	India	ITV Network	Hindi
India News Punjab	India	ITV Network	Punjabi
India News Rajasthan	India	ITV Network	Hindi
India News Uttar Pradesh Uttarakhand	India	ITV Network	Hindi
India TV	India		Hindi
India Today	India	Living Media Group	English
Jai Maharashtra	India		Marathi
Jai Telangana TV	India		Telugu
Jan TV	India	CSL Infomedia Pvt. Ltd.	Hindi
Janam TV	India	Janam Multimedia Limited	Malayam
Janasri News	India		Kannada
Kalaignar Seithigal	India	Kalaignar TV Private Limited	Tamil
Kasthuri Newz 24	India		Kannada
Kolkata TV	India		Bengali
Manorama News	India	Malayalam Manorama Company Ltd	Malayam
Mathrubhumi News	India	Mathrubhumi	Malayam
MediaOne TV	India	Madhyamam Broadcasting Limited	Malayam
Mirror Now	India	The Times Group	English
ND24	India	ND24 Media	Assamese
NDTV 24x7	India	Adani Group	English
NDTV India	India	Adani Group	Hindi
NDTV Rajasthan	India	Adani Group	Hindi
NDTV Madhya Pradesh Chhattisgarh	India	Adani Group	Hindi
NDTV Marathi	India	Adani Group	Marathi
NDTV World	India	Adani Group	English
NE News	India	ITV Network	Assamese
News7 Tamil	India	VV Group	Tamil
News18 Assam North East	India	Network18 Group	Assamese
News18 Bangla	India	Network18 Group	Bengali
News18 Bihar Jharkhand	India	Network18 Group	Hindi
News18 Gujarati	India	Network18 Group	Gujarati
News18 India	India	Network18 Group	Hindi
News18 Jammu Kashmir Ladakh Himachal Haryana	India	Network18 Group	Kashmiri and Ladakhi
News18 Kannada	India	Network18 Group	Kannada
News18 Kerala	India	Network18 Group	Malayalam
News18 Lokmat	India	Network18 Group	Marathi
News18 Madhya Pradesh Chhattisgarh	India	Network18 Group	Hindi
News18 Odia	India	Network18 Group	Odia
News18 Punjab	India	Network18 Group	Hindi and Punjabi
News18 Rajasthan	India	Network18 Group	Hindi
News18 Tamil Nadu	India	Network18 Group	Tamil
News18 Urdu	India	Network18 Group	Urdu
News18 Uttar Pradesh Uttarakhand	India	Network18 Group	Hindi
News 24	India	B.A.G Network	Hindi
News India 24x7	India	Omega TV Media Pvt Ltd	Hindi
News Time Bangla	India	Brand Value Communications	Bengali
News World India	India	F7 Broadcast Pvt. Ltd.	Hindi and English
NewsX	India	ITV Network	English
NewsX World	India	ITV Network	English
Odisha TV	India		Odia
Polimer News	India	Polimer TV Network	Tamil
Prime9 News	India	Samhitha Broadcasting Pvt. Ltd	Telugu
PTC News	India		Punjabi
Public TV	India		Kannada
R9 TV	India		Hindi
Raj News Kannada	India	Raj Television Network	Kannada
Raj News Malayalam	India	Raj Television Network	Malayalam
Raj News Tamil	India	Raj Television Network	Tamil
Raj News Telugu	India	Raj Television Network	Telugu
Reporter TV	India	Reporter Broadcasting Company	Malayalam
Republic Bangla	India	Republic Media Network	Bengali
Republic Bharat	India	Republic Media Network	Hindi
Republic Kannada	India	Republic Media Network	Kannada
Republic TV	India	Republic Media Network	English
Saam TV	India	Sakal Media Group	Marathi
Sadhna News	India	Asia Limited	Hindi
Sahara Samay	India	Sahara One Media & Entertainment Limited	Hindi
Sahara Samay Bihar Jharkhand	India	Sahara One Media & Entertainment Limited	Hindi
Sahara Samay Madhya Pradesh Chhattisgarh	India	Sahara One Media & Entertainment Limited	Hindi
Sahara Samay Rajasthan	India	Sahara One Media & Entertainment Limited	Hindi
Sahara Samay Uttar Pradesh Uttarakhand	India	Sahara One Media & Entertainment Limited	Hindi
Sakshi TV	India		Telugu
Samaya TV	India		Kannada
Sandesh News	India	Sandesh Group	Gujarati
Sudarshan News	India		Hindi
Sun News	India	Sun TV Network	Tamil
Surya Samachar	India	Surya Sagar Communication Pvt Ltd	Hindi
T News	India		Telugu
Thanthi TV	India	Metronation Chennai Television Pvt Ltd.	Tamil
Times Now	India	The Times Group	English
Times Now Navbharat	India	The Times Group	Hindi
TV5	India	Shreya Broadcasting Pvt, Ltd India	Telugu
TV9 Bharatvarsh	India	ABCL Broadcasting	Hindi
TV9 Bangla	India	ABCL Broadcasting	Bangla
TV9 Gujarati	India	ABCL Broadcasting	Gujarati
TV9 Kannada	India	ABCL Broadcasting	Kannada
TV9 Marathi	India	ABCL Broadcasting	Marathi
TV9 Telugu	India	ABCL Broadcasting	Telugu
TV 24	India		Hindi
WION	India	Essel Group	English and Russian
Zee 24 Ghanta	India	Essel Group	Bengali
Zee 24 Kalak	India	Essel Group	Gujarati
Zee 24 Taas	India	Essel Group	Marathi
Zee Bharat	India	Essel Group	Hindi
Zee Bihar Jharkhand	India	Essel Group	Bhojpuri
Zee Delhi NCR Haryana	India	Essel Group	Hindi
Zee J&K Ladakh	India	Essel Group	Urdu
Zee Kannada News	India	Essel Group	Kannada
Zee Madhya Pradesh Chhattisgarh	India	Essel Group	Hindi
Zee News	India	Essel Group	Hindi
Zee Punjab Haryana Himachal	India	Essel Group	Punjabi
Zee Rajasthan	India	Essel Group	Hindi
Zee Telugu News	India	Essel Group	Telugu
Zee Uttar Pradesh Uttarakhand	India	Essel Group	Hindi
BeritaSatu	Indonesia	B Universe	Indonesian
CNN Indonesia	Indonesia	Trans Media	Indonesian
iNews	Indonesia	Republikorp (iNews Media Group)	Indonesian
Kompas TV	Indonesia	KG Media	Indonesian
MetroTV	Indonesia	Media Group	Indonesian, English and Chinese
Sindonews TV	Indonesia	Republikorp (iNews Media Group)	Indonesian
Sin Po TV	Indonesia	Sin Po Media	Indonesian
tvOne	Indonesia	Visi Media Asia	Indonesian
Al Alam News Network	Iran	IRIB	Arabic
HispanTV	Iran	IRIB	Spanish
IRINN	Iran	IRIB	Persian
IRINN 2	Iran	IRIB	Persian
Press TV	Iran	IRIB	English and French
Al Forat	Iraq		Arabic
Al Iraqiya News	Iraq	Government of Iraq	Arabic
iNEWS TV	Iraq		Arabic
Iraq 24 TV	Iraq		Arabic
NRT News	Iraq	Nalia Media Corporation	Kurdish
K24	Iraq		Kurdish, English and Arabic
KNN	Iraq	Wusha Corp	Kurdish
Kurdsat News	Iraq		Kurdish
i24NEWS	Israel		English, Spanish, French, Arabic and Hebrew
AbemaNews	Japan	CyberAgent	Japanese
CNNj	Japan	Japan Cable Television	Japanese
JapaNews24	Japan	TV Asahi Holdings Corporation	Japanese
NHK World TV	Japan	NHK	English
NTV News24	Japan	Nippon Television Holdings	Japanese
TBS News	Japan	TBS Holdings	Japanese
Roya News	Jordan	Sayegh Group	Arabic
24KZ	Kazakhstan	Khabar Agency	Kazakh and Russian
KTV News	Kuwait	Kuwait Television	Arabic
Ala Too 24	Kyrgyzstan	KTRK	Russian
TDM Information	Macau	TDM	Chinese (Cantonese), English and Portuguese
Astro Awani	Malaysia	Astro Malaysia Holdings	Malay and English
Berita RTM	Malaysia	RTM	Malay, English, Chinese, Tamil, Bajau, Dusun, Kadazan and Iban
Bernama TV	Malaysia	Bernama	Malay, English, Chinese and Tamil
Eagle News	Mongolia	Mongolian Media Corp, LLC	Mongolian
MNB News	Mongolia	MNB	Mongolian, Russian and Chinese
MNC	Mongolia		Mongolian
DVB TV	Myanmar	DVB Multimedia Group	Burmese
MITV	Myanmar	MRTV	English
MRTV News	Myanmar	MRTV	Burmese
One News	Myanmar	SKY NET	Burmese
ABC TV	Nepal		Nepali
Avenues TV	Nepal		Nepali
News 24	Nepal		Nepali and Maithili
NTV News	Nepal	Nepal Television	Nepali and English
7 News	Pakistan	HL Media Corporation (Pvt) Ltd.	Urdu
24 Digital	Pakistan	City Media Group	Urdu and English
92 News	Pakistan		Urdu
Aaj News	Pakistan	Business Recorder Group	Urdu
Abb Takk News	Pakistan	Apna Group	Urdu
Apna News	Pakistan	Apna Group	Urdu
Aik News	Pakistan	Big Tree Media Pvt Ltd.	Urdu
ARY News	Pakistan	ARY Digital	Urdu and English
BOL News	Pakistan	AsiaPak Investments	Urdu
Capital TV	Pakistan		Urdu
Channel 5	Pakistan	Khabrain Group	Urdu
City 41	Pakistan	City Media Group	Urdu and English
City 42	Pakistan	City Media Group	Urdu and English
Dawn News	Pakistan	Dawn Media Group	English
Din News	Pakistan	Din Media Group	Urdu
Dunya News	Pakistan	Dunya Media Group Network	Urdu
Express News	Pakistan	Lakson Group	Urdu and English
GEO News	Pakistan	Jang Media Group	Urdu
GEO Tez	Pakistan	Jang Media Group	Urdu
GNN	Pakistan	Gourmet Foods	Urdu
GTV News	Pakistan		Urdu
Hum News	Pakistan	Hum Network Limited	Urdu
KTN News	Pakistan	Kawish Television Network	Sindhi
Khyber News	Pakistan	AVT Channels Network	Pushto
Lahore News	Pakistan	Dunya Media Group Network	Urdu
News One	Pakistan	Air Waves Media (Pvt) Ltd.	Urdu
Pakistan TV	Pakistan	PTV	English
PTV News	Pakistan	PTV	Urdu
Public News	Pakistan	A-Plus Entertainment	Urdu
Rohi	Pakistan	City Media Group	Urdu
Royal News	Pakistan	Royal Media Network	Urdu
Samaa TV	Pakistan		Urdu
Sindh TV News	Pakistan	Dolphin Media House	Sindhi
SUCH TV	Pakistan		Sindhi
Suno News HD	Pakistan		Urdu
VSH News	Pakistan	Visionary Group	Balochi
ANC	Philippines	ABS-CBN	English and Filipino
Bilyonaryo News Channel	Philippines	Prage Management Corporation	English and Filipino
Brigada News TV	Philippines	Brigada Mass Media Corporation	Cebuano
DZRH TV	Philippines	MBC Media Group	Filipino
DZMM TeleRadyo	Philippines	Philippine Collective Media Corporation	Filipino
GMA News TV	Philippines	GMA Network	English and Filipino
GNN	Philippines	Global Satellite Technology Services	English and Filipino
One News	Philippines	Cignal TV (MediaQuest Holdings)	English and Filipino
One PH	Philippines	Cignal TV (MediaQuest Holdings)	English and Filipino
SMNI News Channel	Philippines	Sonshine Media Network International	English and Filipino
Al Araby	Qatar	Fadaat Media	Arabic
Al Jazeera	Qatar	Al Jazeera Media Network	Arabic
Al Jazeera Balkans	Qatar	Al Jazeera Media Network	Bosnian, Croatian and Serbian
Al Jazeera English	Qatar	Al Jazeera Media Network	English
Al Jazeera Now	Qatar	Al Jazeera Media Network	Arabic
Al Arabiya	Saudi Arabia	MBC Group	Arabic
Al Arabiya English	Saudi Arabia	MBC Group	English
Al Ekhbariya	Saudi Arabia	SBA	Arabic
Al Hadath	Saudi Arabia	MBC Group	Arabic
Asharq News	Saudi Arabia	SRMG	Arabic
CNA	Singapore	Mediacorp	English
JTBC News	South Korea	JTBC	Korean
KBS News 24	South Korea	KBS	Korean
MBC News Now	South Korea	MBC	Korean
MBN News	South Korea	MBN	Korean
SBS No.1 Breaking News	South Korea	SBS	Korean
Yonhap News TV	South Korea	Yonhap News Agency	Korean
YTN	South Korea	YTN	Korean
Ada Derana 24	Sri Lanka	TV Derana	Sinhala and English
News First	Sri Lanka	Capital Maharaja Organization Ltd	Sinhala, English and Tamil
Syrian News Channel	Syria	GART	Arabic
Syria TV	Syria	Fadaat Media	Arabic
CTi News	Taiwan	CTi	Chinese
CTS News & Info	Taiwan	CTS	Chinese
CTV News	Taiwan	CTV	Chinese
EBC News	Taiwan	EBC	Chinese
Era News	Taiwan	Era	Chinese
FTV News	Taiwan	FTV	Chinese
Global News	Taiwan	Asia Digital Media Co., Ltd.	Chinese
Global News Taiwan	Taiwan	Asia Digital Media Co., Ltd.	Chinese
mnews	Taiwan	Mirror TV	Chinese
PTS News 24	Taiwan	PTS	Chinese
SET News	Taiwan	SET	Chinese
SET iNews	Taiwan	SET	Chinese
TTV News	Taiwan	TTV	Chinese
TVBS News	Taiwan	TVBS Media Inc.	Chinese
Nation TV	Thailand	Nation Group	Thai
TNN 16	Thailand	True Corporation	Thai
Al Mashhad Media	United Arab Emirates		Arabic
Sky News Arabia	United Arab Emirates	Sky, ADMIC	Arabic
O‘zbekiston 24	Uzbekistan	MTRK	Uzbek
Uzreport TV	Uzbekistan	Agency «UzReport»	Uzbek
Uzreport World	Uzbekistan	Agency «UzReport»	English
Vietnam Today	Vietnam	VTV	English
VTV1	Vietnam	VTV	Vietnamese
VTV4	Vietnam	VTV	Vietnamese, English, Mandarin, French and Russian

=== Europe ===
Network	Country	Owner	Language
A2 CNN	Albania	G2 Media sh.	Albanian
ABC News	Albania	A.B.C Management	Albanian
CNA	Albania		Albanian
Fax News	Albania		Albanian
Klan News	Albania	TVKLAN SH.A	Albanian
News 24	Albania	Focus Media Group	Albanian
Ora News	Albania		Albanian
Panorama TV	Albania		Albanian
Report TV	Albania		Albanian
RTSH 24	Albania	Radio Televizioni Shqiptar	Albanian
Top News	Albania	Top Media Group	Albanian
1TV News	Armenia	Public Television of Armenia	Armenian
OE24.TV	Austria	Mediengruppe "Österreich" GmbH	German
Puls 24	Austria	ProSiebenSat.1 Media	German
ARB 24	Azerbaijan	ARB Media Group	Azerbaijani
Pervyi informatsionnyi	Belarus	Belteleradio	Belarusian
Medya Haber TV	Belgium		Turkish
Bulgaria ON AIR	Bulgaria	Investor.BG EAD	Bulgarian
Nova News	Bulgaria	United Group	Bulgarian
HRT 4	Croatia	HRT	Croatian
CNN Prima News	Czech Republic	FTV Prima	Czech
ČT24	Czech Republic	Česká televize	Czech
Current Time TV	Czech Republic	Radio Free Europe/Radio Liberty	Russian
TN Live	Czech Republic	CME	Czech
TV 2 News	Denmark	TV 2 Denmark	Danish
TVA Live	Denmark	DR	Danish
MTV Uutiset Live	Finland	MTV Oy	Finnish
BFM TV	France	RMC BFM	French
BFM 2	France	RMC BFM	French
BFM Locales	France	RMC BFM	French
CNews	France	Canal+ S.A.	French
CNews Prime	France	Canal+ S.A.	French
Euronews	France	Euronews SA	English, French, German, Italian, Spanish, Portuguese, Russian, Arabic, Turkish, Persian, Polish, Ukrainian, Greek, Hungarian, Albanian, Georgian, Serbian, Bulgarian and Romanian
France 24	France	France Médias Monde	French, English, Arabic and Spanish
France Info	France	France Télévisions	French
i24NEWS	France, Israel	Patrick Drahi	French, English, Arabic, Spanish and Hewbrew
LCI	France	Groupe TF1	French
TV5Monde Info	France, Switzerland, Belgium, Canada, Monaco	TV5Monde, S.A.	French
Kavkasia	Georgia		Georgian
Maestro	Georgia	Imedi Media Holding	Georgian
Palitra News	Georgia		Georgian
DW-TV	Germany	DW	German, English, French, Spanish and Arabic
n-tv	Germany	RTL Group	German
Phoenix	Germany	ARD and ZDF	German
Welt	Germany	Axel Springer SE	German
Tagesschau24	Germany	ARD	German
ERT News	Greece	ERT	Greek
Mega News	Greece	Alter Ego Media	Greek
ATV	Hungary	Broadcast Projekt Kft. (Hungary), Woodham Enterprise Ltd. (Panama)	Hungarian
Hír TV	Hungary		Hungarian
RTÉ News	Ireland	RTÉ	English, Irish and Irish Sign Language
IlSole24Ore TV	Italy	Gruppo 24 Ore	Italian
Rai News 24	Italy	RAI	Italian
Sky TG24	Italy	Sky	Italian
Sky TG24 Primo Piano	Italy	Sky	Italian
TgCom24	Italy	Mediaset	Italian
TG Norba 24	Italy	Gruppo Norba	Italian
Urania News	Italy		Italian
21 Newsbiz	Kosovo	21 Company	Albanian and Serbian
Arta News	Kosovo	KOHA Group	Albanian and Serbian
RTK 3	Kosovo	Radio Television of Kosovo	Albanian and Serbian
TV24	Latvia	TV Latvija	Latvian
Info TV	Lithuania	LNK UAB	Lithuanian
Televizija Vijesti	Montenegro	Vijesti	Montenegrin
NPO Politiek en Nieuws	Netherlands	NPO	Dutch
Televizija 24	North Macedonia		Macedonian
NRK Nyheter Nyhetstrømmen	Norway	NRK	Norwegian
TV 2 Nyheter	Norway	Egmont Group	Norwegian
News24	Poland	Astro S.A.	Polish
Newsmax Polska	Poland	Newsmax	Polish
Polsat News	Poland	Grupa Polsat Plus	Polish
Polsat News 2	Poland	Grupa Polsat Plus	Polish
TVN24	Poland	TVN Grupa Skydance	Polish
TVN24 BiS	Poland	TVN Grupa Skydance	Polish
TVP Info	Poland	Telewizja Polska	Polish
TVP World	Poland	Telewizja Polska	English
TV Republika	Poland	Telewizja Republika	Polish
TV Republika Plus	Poland	Telewizja Republika	Polish
wPolsce24	Poland	Fratria	Polish
Wydarzenia 24	Poland	Grupa Polsat Plus	Polish
CNN Portugal	Portugal	Media Capital	Portuguese
News Now	Portugal	Medialivre	Portuguese
RTP Notícias	Portugal	RTP	Portuguese
SIC Notícias	Portugal	Impresa	Portuguese
Aleph News	Romania		Romanian
Antena 3 CNN	Romania	Intact Media Group	Romanian
B1	Romania		Romanian
Digi24	Romania	Digi Communications	Romanian
NCN	Romania		Romanian
Prima News	Romania	Clever Group	Romanian
Realitatea Plus	Romania		Romanian
România TV	Romania		Romanian
TVR Info	Romania	TVR	Romanian
Moscow 24	Russia	VGTRK	Russian
Mir 24	Russia	Mir Group	Russian
RT	Russia	ANO TV-Novosti	English, French, Spanish, Arabic and German
RT Arabic	Russia	ANO TV-Novosti	Arabic
RT en Español	Russia	ANO TV-Novosti	Spanish
RT India	Russia	ANO TV-Novosti	English
Russia 24	Russia	VGTRK	Russian
N1	Serbia, Croatia, Slovenia	United Group	Bosnian, Croatian and Serbian
Vesti	Serbia	Pink International Company	Serbian
24	Slovakia	STVR	Slovak and Hungarian
JOJ 24	Slovakia	J&T Media Enterprise	Slovak
TA3	Slovakia	Blueberg Media	Slovak
TN Live	Slovakia	CME	Slovak
Nova24TV	Slovenia		Slovene
Top TV	Slovenia		Slovene
TV SLO 3	Slovenia	RTV SLO	Slovene
3CatInfo	Spain	CCMA	Catalan and Aranese Occitan
24 Horas	Spain	RTVE	Spanish
RTS Info	Switzerland	SRG SSR	French
SRF Info	Switzerland	SRG SSR	German
24	Turkey	TürkMedya	Turkish
A Haber	Turkey	Kalyon Group	Turkish
A News	Turkey	Kalyon Group	English
Akit TV	Turkey	Akit Medya Grubu	Turkish
AS TV	Turkey	Sönmez Holding	Turkish
Bengü Türk TV	Turkey		Turkish
CNN Türk	Turkey	Demirören Group	Turkish
Ekol TV	Turkey		Turkish
Flash Haber	Turkey		Turkish
Haber Global	Turkey	Global Media Group	Turkish
Habertürk TV	Turkey	Can Media Group	Turkish
Halk TV	Turkey		Turkish
Kanal B	Turkey	Başkent University	Turkish
KRT TV	Turkey		Turkish
Lider Haber	Turkey	Ender Alkoçlar	Turkish
NTV	Turkey	Doğuş Media Group	Turkish
Sözcü TV	Turkey		Turkish
Tele1	Turkey	TMSF	Turkish
TGRT Haber	Turkey	Ihlas Holding	Turkish
TH Türkhaber TV	Turkey		Turkish
TRT Arabi	Turkey	TRT	Arabic
TRT Haber	Turkey	TRT	Turkish
TRT World	Turkey	TRT	English
TV5	Turkey		Turkish
TV100	Turkey	Gülseven Medya Grubu	Turkish
TVNET	Turkey	Albayrak Medya Grubu	Turkish
Ülke TV	Turkey	Kanal 7 Medya Grubu	Turkish
Ulusal Kanal	Turkey		Turkish
YOL TV	Turkey		Turkish
24 Kanal	Ukraine	Lux Television and Radio Company	Ukrainian
Espreso TV	Ukraine		Ukrainian
FREEДОМ	Ukraine	Ukrinform	Ukrainian, English, Crimean Tatar and Arabic
Kanal 5	Ukraine	Free Media Holding	Ukrainian
Arise News	United Kingdom		English
BBC News (UK)	United Kingdom	BBC	English
BBC News (International)	United Kingdom	BBC Studios (BBC Global News)	English
BBC News Arabic	United Kingdom	BBC	Arabic
BBC News Persian	United Kingdom	BBC	Persian
GB News	United Kingdom	All Perspectives Ltd. (private)	English
Sky News	United Kingdom	Comcast	English
Talk	United Kingdom	News UK	English

== Parliament news channels ==
=== Africa ===
Network	Country	Language(s)
TV9	Algeria	Arabic
TV Parlamento	Angola	Portuguese
PBU Bunge TV	Kenya	English and Swahili
AIT Parliamentary	Nigeria	English
NTA Parliament	Nigeria	English
Parliament TV	South Africa	English
Parliament TV	Zambia	English

=== Americas ===
Network	Country	Language(s)
Diputados TV	Argentina	Spanish
TV Assembleia	Brazil	Portuguese
TV Câmara	Brazil	Portuguese
CPAC	Canada	English and French
CDTV	Chile	Spanish
Canal Institucional	Colombia	Spanish
TV Legislativa	Ecuador	Spanish
Televisión Legislativa	El Salvador	Spanish
Congreso TV	Honduras	Spanish
Canal del Congreso	Mexico	Spanish
Congreso TV	Peru	Spanish
The Parliament Channel	Trinidad and Tobago	English
C-SPAN	United States	English
Parlamento TV	Uruguay	Spanish
ANTV	Venezuela	Spanish

=== Asia-Pacific ===
Network	Country	Language
Sangsad Television	Bangladesh	Bengali
Sansad TV	India	Hindi
TVR Parlemen	Indonesia	Indonesian
Kurdistan Parliament TV	Iraq	Kurdi
Arutz HaKnesset	Israel	Hebrew
RTM Parlimen	Malaysia	Malay
MRTV Parliament	Myanmar	Burmese
Parliament TV	New Zealand	English and Māori
PTV Parliament	Pakistan	Urdu
Congress TV	Philippines	English and Filipino
Al Hadath	Saudi Arabia	Arabic
NATV	South Korea	Korean
CTS Parliamentary TV 1	Taiwan	Chinese
CTS Parliamentary TV 2	Taiwan	Chinese
TPTV	Thailand	Thai

=== Europe ===
Network	Country	Language
RTSH Kuvend	Albania	Albanian
Vlaams Parlement TV	Belgium	Dutch
Folketinget TV	Denmark	Danish
EuroparlTV	Europe	English
La Chaîne Parlementaire	France	French
LCP	France	French
Phoenix	Germany	German
Vouli Tileorasi	Greece	Greek
Alþingi TV	Iceland	Icelandic
Oireachtas TV	Ireland	Irish and English
Camera dei Deputati	Italy	Italian
Chamber TV	Luxembourg	Luxembourgish and French
Parliament TV	Malta	Maltese
TVCG 3	Montenegro	Montenegrin
NPO Politiek en Nieuws	Netherlands	Dutch
MRT Sobraniski Kanal	North Macedonia	Macedonian
Polsat News Polityka	Poland	Polish
TVP Parlament	Poland	Polish
ARTV	Portugal	Portuguese
Duma TV	Russia	Russian
Canal Parlamento	Spain	Spanish
TBMM TV	Turkey	Turkish
Rada TV	Ukraine	Ukrainian
BBC Parliament	United Kingdom	English

== Crime news channels ==
=== Americas ===
Network	Country	Language(s)
CourtTV	United States	English

=== Asia-Pacific ===
Network	Country	Language(s)
CCTV-12	China	Chinese
CMG-2	China	Chinese
CQTV-4	China	Chinese
GZBN-3	China	Chinese (Standard Chinese and Cantonese)
HNTV-4	China	Chinese
JNTV-5	China	Chinese
NTV-3	China	Chinese
SXTV Society & Law	China	Chinese

=== Europe ===
Network	Country	Language(s)
CourtTV UK and Ireland	United Kingdom, Ireland	English

== Business news channels ==
=== Africa ===
Network	Country	Language(s)
Business 24	Africa	French
BB24	Benin	French
CNBC Africa	South Africa	English

=== Americas ===
Network	Country	Language(s)
Canal E	Argentina	Spanish
BM&C News	Brazil	Portuguese
CNN Brasil Money	Brazil	Portuguese
Times Brasil	Brazil	Portuguese
BNN Bloomberg	Canada	English
Negocios Ditu	Colombia	Spanish
Bloomberg El Financiero	Mexico	Spanish and English
5 días TV	Paraguay	Spanish
Bloomberg Television	United States	English
CNBC	United States	English
CNBC World	United States	English
Fox Business	United States	English
Yahoo Finance	United States	English

=== Asia-Pacific ===
Network	Country	Language(s)
Ausbiz TV	Australia	English
Bloomberg TV Australia	Australia	English
Ekhon	Bangladesh	Bengali
AHTV-2	China	Chinese
BRTV-5	China	Chinese
CCTV-2	China	Chinese
CDTV-2	China	Chinese
FJTV-7	China	Chinese
HNTV-1	China	Chinese
Hunan ETV	China	Chinese
Oriental Financial	China	Chinese
QTV-2	China	Chinese
SCTV-2	China	Chinese
SDTV-2	China	Chinese
SXTV Economic & Technology	China	Chinese
SYTV-2	China	Chinese
SZTV-3	China	Chinese
Yicai	China	Chinese
ZTV-3	China	Chinese
HOY 76	Hong Kong	English
now Business News Channel	Hong Kong	Chinese (Cantonese)
Business Today	India	Hindi
CNBC Awaaz	India	Hindi
CNBC Bajar	India	Gujarati
CNBC-TV18	India	English
CNBC-TV18 Prime	India	English
ET Now	India	English
ET Now Swadesh	India	Hindi
NDTV Profit	India	English
Zee Business	India	Hindi
CNBC Indonesia	Indonesia	Indonesian
IDX Channel	Indonesia	Indonesian
Al Iraqiya Business	Iraq	Arabic
Business Media Channel (BMC)	Iraq	Kurdi
Nikkei CNBC	Japan	Japanese
Bloomberg TV Malaysia	Malaysia	English and Malay
Bloomberg TV Mongolia	Mongolia	Mongolian
Al Arabiya Business	Saudi Arabia	Arabic
CNBC Asia	Singapore	English
DealSite Economy TV	South Korea	Korean
EDaily TV	South Korea	Korean
KETV	South Korea	Korean
Maeil Business TV	South Korea	Korean
MTN	South Korea	Korean
PAX Economy TV	South Korea	Korean
SBS Biz	South Korea	Korean
SENTV	South Korea	Korean
Tomato TV	South Korea	Korean
Yonhap News Economy TV	South Korea	Korean
EBC Financial News	Taiwan	Chinese
Global Business News	Taiwan	Chinese
TTV Finance	Taiwan	Chinese
Unique Business News	Taiwan	Chinese
CNBC Arabia	United Arab Emirates	Arabic
ON Info TV	Vietnam	Vietnamese
SCTV-18 VITV	Vietnam	Vietnamese

=== Europe ===
Network	Country	Language(s)
Armenian Business News	Armenia	Armenian
Trends Z	Belgium	Dutch and French
Bloomberg TV Bulgaria	Bulgaria	Bulgarian
B SMART	France	French
BFM Business	France	French
Naftemporiki TV	Greece	Greek
Class CNBC	Italy	Italian
21 Business	Kosovo	Albanian and Serbian
RTL Z	Netherlands	Dutch
Biznes24	Poland	Polish
TVN24 BiS	Poland	Polish
Aleph Business	Romania	Romanian
RBC TV	Russia	Russian
Bloomberg TV Adria	Serbia, Croatia, Bosnia and Herzegovina, Montenegro, North Macedonia, Slovenia	Serbian, Croatian, Bosnian, Montenegrin, Macedonian and Slovenian
A Para	Turkey	Turkish
Bloomberg HT	Turkey	Turkish
CNBC-e	Turkey	Turkish
Ekotürk	Turkey	Turkish
CNBC Europe	United Kingdom	English

== Sport news channels ==
=== Africa ===
Network	Country	Language(s)
Africa 24 Sport	Africa	French
SuperSport Blitz	South Africa	English

=== Americas ===
Network	Country	Language(s)
RDS Info	Canada	French
CBS Sports HQ	United States	English
ESPNews	United States	English
Sports News Highlights	United States	English

=== Asia-Pacific ===
Network	Country	Language(s)
Fox Sports News	Australia	English
beIN Sports News	Qatar	Arabic
ON Sports News	Vietnam	Vietnamese and English

=== Europe ===
Network	Country	Language(s)
Viaplay Sport News	Denmark	Danish
Infosport+	France	French
Sky Sport News	Germany	German
Magenta Sport Highlights	Greece	Greek
Novasports News	Greece	Greek
Sky Sport 24	Italy	Italian
Polsat Sport 3	Poland	Polish
Sport TV +	Portugal	Portuguese
Digi Sport 3	Romania	Romanian
beIN Sports Haber	Turkey	Turkish
Sky Sports News	United Kingdom	English

== Weather news channels ==
=== Africa ===
Network	Country	Language(s)
People's Weather	South Africa	English

=== Americas ===
Network	Country	Language(s)
Climatempo	Brazil	Portuguese
MétéoMédia	Canada	French
The Weather Network	Canada	English
CalaWeather	Caribbean	English
Mega Tiempo	Chile	Spanish
AccuWeather Network	United States	English
Fox Weather	United States	English
News 12+	United States	English
The Weather Channel	United States	English
WeatherNation TV	United States	English

=== Asia-Pacific ===
Network	Country	Language(s)
News24 Weather	Australia	English
China Weather Television	China	Chinese
Weathernews LiVE	Japan	Japanese

=== Europe ===
Network	Country	Language(s)
La Chaîne Météo	France	French
EarthTV	Germany	English
wetter.com TV	Germany	German
Sky Meteo 24	Italy	Italian
Pogoda24.tv	Poland	Polish
Wetter.tv	Switzerland	German
BBC Weather Live	United Kingdom	English

== See also ==
- List of news presenters
- International news channels
