= NTV =

NTV or ntv may refer to:

== Television ==
=== Asia ===
- Nepal Television
  - NTV Plus (Nepali TV channel), a city channel owned by the Government of Nepal
- Next TV, or NTV, Taiwanese television station
  - NTV Variety, a satellite cable channel operated by Next TV in Taiwan
- Nippon Television (Nittele), Minato, Tokyo, Japan
  - BS NTV, a Japanese television channel
  - NTV G+
  - NTV News24
- NTV (Bangladesh), a Bengali-language satellite television channel in Bangladesh
- NTV (India), Telugu regional channel
- NTV (Mongolia), a television channel based in Mongolia
- NTV (Sri Lanka), a defunct English-language television channel in Sri Lanka
- NTV (Turkish TV channel), a nationwide television news channel
- NTV7, a Malaysian television network
- Nusantara TV, Indonesian digital TV network

=== Europe and UK ===
- Norges Televisjon, Norway
- Nova (Bulgarian TV channel)
- n-tv, a German news channel owned by RTL
- NTV, a section of British entertainment programme Noel's House Party
- NTV (Newport Television), University of Wales, Newport, UK
- NTV (Portugal), renamed RTPN
- NTV (Russia), Russian: НТВ, a Russian television channel
  - NTV Plus, the brand name for the Russian digital satellite television service
  - NTV Plus Sport, Russia's first dedicated sports channel
- NTV Montena, a regional broadcaster in Montenegro
- NTV-5, a defunct Latvian television channel
- Nuova Televisione, a defunct regional broadcaster in Italy

=== North America ===
- CJON-DT (on-air name NTV), St. John's, Newfoundland and Labrador, Canada
- NASA TV, US
- Nebraska Television Network, a group of ABC affiliates in central and western Nebraska, known on air as NTV News
- Northern Television, a defunct two-station network in northern British Columbia, Canada
- NTV Canada, Canadian Russian language channel

=== Other countries ===
- Nauru Television, the state broadcaster of Nauru
- NTV (Chilean TV channel), a Chilean television channel
- NTV (Kenya)
- NTV Uganda, TV station in Uganda

== Other uses ==
- NTV Beleza, a football team which plays in Division 1 of Japan's Nadeshiko League
- Nuovo Trasporto Viaggiatori, World's first private open-access operator of 300 km/h high-speed trains
- Ngô Thanh Vân (born 1979), Vietnamese singer
