= List of Konkani-language television channels =

This is a list of television channels that broadcast wholly or partly in Konkani, an Indo-Aryan language belonging to the Southern branch of the language family (along with Marathi) and spoken by around 2 million people, mainly in pockets along the west coast of India, especially the area in and around Goa, as well as in districts of Maharashtra to the north Karnataka to the south and east. Due to its relatively small number of speakers (compared with other regional Indian languages whose native speakers number in the tens of millions), there are relatively few monolingual Konkani television stations.

- Prime TV - Prime TV is available in Goa, Pune, Kolhapur and Mumbai.
- In Goa News - The only 24-hour Marathi and Konkani TV channel of Goa.
- Channel Crime Dial News is part of Netwerk Cancel
- HCN GOA - A 24-hour Konkani TV channel owned by the O Heraldo Group, a Goa-centred media conglomerate which also operates the O Heraldo daily newspaper.
- Goa 365 - Goa 365 is a 24 hrs English and Konkani Television Channel of Goa.
- Prudent Media - Prudent media is widely watched konkani channel in Goa, with more than 3 lakh YouTube subscribers, it is also highly viewed outside goa too.
- RDX GOA - RDX is a Konkani-language television channel available in Goa and parts of Maharashtra (Thane, Pune, Aurangabad and the Mumbai area) via the Hathway Cable Network.
- GC TV - GC TV provides a mainstream television service in the Konkani language including foreign and domestic movies, primetime dramas, and news.
- NCH TV - 24 hours Konkani language Christian Religious channel.
- Glory TV - 24 hours Konkani language Christian Religious channel.
- Rophe TV - Christian Channel in the region of Goa, Kolhapur, Mumbai, Karwar, Malvan etc.
- CCR TV - Konkani and English language channel that broadcasts Christian and other general programmes.
- GTV Goa - GTV Goa is 24 hours konkani TV channel that shows news and cultural programme.
- Goan Reporter - is an Online TV News Channel giving you latest news and happenings from in and around Goa.
- Goa News Link

== Mangalore ==
- Daijiworld 24x7 by Daijiworld Media - Daijiworld is a local Multilingual TV Channel for the twin district of Dakshina Kannada and Udupi. It broadcasts news in Kannada and cultural shows in Konkani, Tulu and Byari languages. Daijiworld broadcast Konkani Programmes everyday on their prime time 9:00 PM to 10:00 PM IST. Monday to Friday .
- Divine Word TV by Divine Word Charitable Trust, which is Organization run by Roman Catholic Diocese of Mangalore and Diocese of Udupi in collaboration with the V4 Media Cable. Divine Word TV is a 24 hours Konkani language Catholic Religious TV channel. This channels serves for the twin Diocese of Mangalore and Diocese of Udupi
- Big J TV - Big J TV broadcasts some Konkani programmes are scheduled daily. Most of TV shows are broadcast in English, Kannada and also in Hindi.

== Internet streaming ==
Most of the Konkani TV channel are available live streaming on the internet. konkanitv.tumblr.com is one such site that allows you to watch most of the above television channels live.

- Konkani TV Canada - KTV Canada broadcasts bi-weekly Konkani News from Toronto, Canada.
