= Hornbill (disambiguation) =

A hornbill is a group of birds characterized by a long, down-curved bill, sometimes with a casque on the upper mandible.

Hornbill may also refer to:

- Hornbill Festival, a Festival in Nagaland
- Hornbill Films, a Chicago-based film distribution and production company
- Hornbill Skyways, a regional charter helicopter service operating in towns and rural area in Sarawak, Malaysia
- Hornbill TV, a Television channel in Nagaland
- USS Hornbill, US Navy warships, active in World War II
- Hawker Hornbill, 1925 military aircraft prototype
