= Opinion polling for the 2012 Taiwanese presidential election =

Nationwide public opinion polling have been commissioned in the leadup to the Taiwanese presidential election of 2012 by various organisations, including the Apple Daily, China Times, Global Views Magazine, Liberty Times, Era News and TVBS News. Election forecasts have also been released by various organisations, including the National Chengchi University, China Times, "Gallup" Market Research (not part of the global Gallup organization), Global Views Magazine, and TVBS News, through the use of different forecasting models.

Sources such as TVBS News, United Daily News, and China Times are considered to be pro-unification, while sources such as Liberty Times are considered to be pro-independence.

== Opinion polling ==
=== Two-way race ===
Poll Source	Date of completion	Ma Ying-jeou	Tsai Ing-wen	Undecided
Democratic Progressive Party	April 26, 2011	36.23%	41.16%	22.61%
Trendspotting Survey and Research	April 26, 2011	33.45%	43.35%	23.20%
Master Survey and Research	April 26, 2011	33.81%	43.11%	23.08%
All Dimension Survey and Research	April 26, 2011	35.87%	42.93%	21.20%
Era News	April 26, 2011	35.86%	41.97%	22.17%
China Times	April 27, 2011	33.0%	33.4%	33.6%
United Daily News	April 27, 2011	36%	37%	26%
Apple Daily	April 27, 2011	29.38%	56.21%	14.41%
TVBS News	April 27, 2011	43%	42%	15%
Shih Hsin University	May 7, 2011	44.2%	38.3%	17.5%
Global Views Survey and Research	May 10, 2011	38.9%	38.6%	22.6%
Apple Daily	May 13, 2011	53.76%	31.97%	14.27%
Master Survey and Research	May 16, 2011	40.6%	41.3%	18.1%
China Times	May 18, 2011	34.9%	26.9%	37.7%
United Daily News	May 18, 2011	45%	27%	27%
Liberty Times	May 19, 2011	29.45%	31.55%	39.00%
TVBS News	May 19, 2011	45%	44%	10%
Liberty Times	May 24, 2011	31.34%	34.57%	34.08%
TVBS News	May 30, 2011	46%	42%	10%
Democratic Progressive Party	June 9, 2011	40.0%	41.3%	18.7%
Apple Daily	June 14, 2011	43.02%	46.27%	10.71%
Global Views Survey and Research	June 15, 2011	41.2%	36.3%	22.5%
TVBS News	June 20, 2011	44%	39%	16%
Era News	June 20, 2011	34.90%	37.35%	27.76%
Liberty Times	June 28, 2011	27.12%	31.66%	41.22%
Trend Survey and Research	June 30, 2011	42.4%	38.8%	18.8%
TVBS News	July 7, 2011	44%	36%	17%
Era News	July 9, 2011	38.6%	33.1%	28.4%
I-tel Survey and Research	July 12, 2011	49.64%	50.36%	—
United Daily News	July 13, 2011	43%	37%	20%
Global Views Survey and Research	July 15, 2011	37.3%	37.2%	25.5%
Apple Daily	July 15, 2011	42.57%	40.80%	16.63%
Trend Survey and Research	July 17, 2011	41.6%	36.3%	22.1%
TVBS News	July 21, 2011	45%	38%	16%
Liberty Times	July 26, 2011	36.39%	34.29%	29.32%
Democratic Progressive Party	July 27, 2011	49.9%	50.1%	—
China Times	August 3, 2011	33.5%	29.2%	37.3%
Era News	August 5, 2011	33.1%	30.1%	36.8%
I-tel Survey and Research	August 11, 2011	50.45%	49.55%	—
Apple Daily	August 12, 2011	44.27%	33.73%	22.00%
United Daily News	August 14, 2011	44%	36%	18%
TVBS News	August 15, 2011	46%	39%	14%
US Congress Report	August 15, 2011	37%	37%	26%
Global Views Survey and Research	August 16, 2011	39.6%	38.1%	22.3%
Trend Survey and Research	August 24, 2011	45.7%	40.2%	14.1%
TVBS News	August 30, 2011	46%	37%	17%
Focus Survey and Research	August 31, 2011	41.1%	39.4%	19.5%
Era News	September 3, 2011	36.9%	30.4%	32.8%
Liberty Times	September 7, 2011	36.87%	33.92%	29.21%
Democratic Progressive Party	September 9, 2011	44.0%	43.6%	12.4%
China Times	September 9, 2011	43.6%	33.7%	22.7%
Apple Daily	September 9, 2011	30.69%	51.29%	18.02%
TVBS News	September 14, 2011	48%	37%	16%
United Daily News	September 14, 2011	46%	39%	14%
Liberty Times	September 16, 2011	36.26%	36.70%	27.04%
Focus Survey and Research	September 16, 2011	42.8%	34.6%	22.6%
Apple Daily	September 17, 2011	42.59%	33.92%	23.49%
Era News	September 17, 2011	41.5%	32.7%	25.7%
China Times	September 18, 2011	41%	36%	23%
Global Views Survey and Research	September 19, 2011	39.2%	38.3%	22.5%
Democratic Progressive Party	September 19, 2011	42.8%	44.3%	12.9%
TVBS News	September 20, 2011	47%	35%	18%
TVBS News	September 22, 2011	47%	37%	17%
TVBS News	September 28, 2011	46%	38%	17%
Focus Survey and Research	September 28, 2011	43.2%	35.9%	11.9%
China Times	October 2, 2011	41.7%	37.1%	21.2%
China Times	October 3, 2011	42.3%	35.3%	22.4%
China Times	October 4, 2011	42.7%	35.8%	21.5%
China Times	October 5, 2011	43.2%	34.8%	22.0%
China Times	October 6, 2011	42.4%	34.1%	23.5%
TVBS News	October 6, 2011	45%	38%	17%
China Times	October 7, 2011	43.0%	34.5%	22.5%
China Times	October 8, 2011	42.0%	34.1%	23.9%
Trend Survey and Research	October 8, 2011	42.9%	33.9%	23.2%
China Times	October 9, 2011	40.9%	34.1%	25.0%
China Times	October 10, 2011	41.0%	32.4%	26.5%
China Times	October 11, 2011	41.4%	33.3%	25.3%
Focus Survey and Research	October 12, 2011	40.6%	32.0%	27.4%
China Times	October 12, 2011	42.5%	32.5%	25.0%
TVBS News	October 12, 2011	43%	38%	19%
China Times	October 13, 2011	43.3%	33.3%	23.4%
China Times	October 14, 2011	43.5%	33.8%	22.7%
United Daily News	October 15, 2011	46%	36%	18%
China Times	October 15, 2011	42.7%	36.3%	21.0%
Taipei University of Education	October 15, 2011	36.5%	30.6%	32.9%
China Times	October 16, 2011	42.4%	35.1%	22.5%
China Times	October 17, 2011	43.1%	35.5%	21.4%
China Times	October 18, 2011	43.6%	35.5%	20.9%
China Times	October 19, 2011	44.2%	35.7%	20.1%
China Times	October 20, 2011	44.1%	36.0%	19.9%
TVBS News	October 20, 2011	45%	39%	16%
China Times	October 21, 2011	44.6%	36.1%	19.3%
China Times	October 22, 2011	44.6%	36.6%	18.8%
China Times	October 23, 2011	43.9%	38.4%	17.7%
China Times	October 24, 2011	43.2%	38.6%	18.2%
China Times	October 25, 2011	44.1%	38.6%	17.3%
Liberty Times	October 26, 2011	35.60%	36.10%	28.30%
TVBS News	October 26, 2011	44%	39%	17%
China Times	October 26, 2011	44.2%	39.6%	16.2%
China Times	October 27, 2011	44.0%	38.7%	17.3%
China Times	October 28, 2011	43.6%	39.0%	17.4%
China Times	October 29, 2011	44.4%	38.5%	17.1%
Decision Making Research	October 29, 2011	37.3%	40.1%	22.6%
China Times	October 30, 2011	44.2%	39.0%	16.8%
TVBS News	October 31, 2011	46%	39%	15%
China Times	November 3, 2011	43.5%	39.7%	16.8%
TVBS News	November 3, 2011	47%	42%	10%
Focus Survey and Research	November 7, 2011	37.8%	36.1%	26.1%
China Times	November 7, 2011	45.4%	41.0%	13.6%
China Times	November 8, 2011	44.1%	40.9%	15.0%
Liberty Times	November 9, 2011	37.17%	36.29%	26.54%
TVBS News	November 10, 2011	45%	44%	11%
China Times	November 11, 2011	42.9%	38.9%	18.2%
United Daily News	November 12, 2011	45%	39%	16%
China Times	November 14, 2011	42.4%	39.2%	18.4%
TVBS News	November 16, 2011	46%	45%	9%
China Times	November 17, 2011	45.0%	39.3%	15.7%
China Times	November 22, 2011	46.1%	41.7%	12.2%
Liberty Times	November 23, 2011	36.58%	39.61%	23.81%

=== Three-way race ===
Poll Source	Date of Completion	Ma Ying-jeou	Tsai Ing-wen	James Soong	Undecided
Era News	July 1, 2011	35.8%	33.9%	8.6%	21.6%
Trend Survey and Research	July 17, 2011	35.8%	32.3%	10.0%	21.9%
TVBS News	July 21, 2011	38%	36%	13%	12%
China Times	August 3, 2011	33.0%	28.6%	10.3%	28.0%
Era News	August 5, 2011	29.3%	27.7%	15.4%	27.6%
Apple Daily	August 12, 2011	38.82%	27.82%	18.95%	14.41%
United Daily News	August 14, 2011	38%	31%	15%	16%
TVBS News	August 15, 2011	39%	35%	16%	9%
Global Views Survey and Research	August 16, 2011	35.1%	33.9%	14.0%	17.0%
Trend Survey and Research	August 24, 2011	37.2%	31.9%	16.7%	14.2%
TVBS News	August 30, 2011	40%	32%	17%	12%
Focus Survey and Research	August 31, 2011	33.1%	32.4%	12.7%	21.8%
Era News	September 3, 2011	35.2%	28.6%	14.3%	21.9%
Liberty Times	September 7, 2011	31.46%	28.23%	14.68%	25.63%
I-tel Survey and Research	September 8, 2011	41.38%	40.89%	17.73%	—
China Times	September 1, 2011	38.8%	31.5%	13.6%	16.1%
TVBS News	September 14, 2011	42%	34%	14%	10%
United Daily News	September 14, 2011	40%	32%	13%	14%
Liberty Times	September 16, 2011	31.61%	31.61%	13.44%	23.34%
Focus Survey and Research	September 16, 2011	33.4%	27.9%	11.4%	27.4%
Apple Daily	September 17, 2011	39.70%	29.64%	16.21%	14.45%
Era News	September 17, 2011	36.3%	28.5%	11.2%	24.1%
China Times	September 18, 2011	39%	32%	11%	18%
Global Views Survey and Research	September 11, 2011	35.8%	36.0%	10.0%	18.2%
Democratic Progressive Party	September 11, 2011	36.2%	37.4%	12.4%	14.0%
TVBS News	September 20, 2011	43%	32%	14%	11%
TVBS News	September 22, 2011	42%	32%	15%	11%
TVBS News	September 28, 2011	40%	33%	14%	13%
Focus Survey and Research	September 28, 2011	33.6%	29.8%	11.5%	16.9%
Trend Survey and Research	September 28, 2011	36.2%	28.4%	9.7%	25.7%
China Times	October 2, 2011	39.5%	36.0%	11.7%	12.8%
China Times	October 3, 2011	38.7%	34.7%	11.1%	15.5%
China Times	October 4, 2011	38.5%	35.1%	12.1%	14.3%
China Times	October 5, 2011	38.4%	33.5%	12.8%	15.3%
China Times	October 6, 2011	37.5%	32.2%	13.7%	16.6%
Master Survey and Research	October 6, 2011	37.3%	36.1%	12.6%	13.9%
TVBS News	October 6, 2011	40%	35%	13%	13%
China Times	October 7, 2011	37.5%	31.7%	13.6%	17.2%
China Times	October 8, 2011	37.7%	31.9%	13.2%	17.2%
Trend Survey and Research	October 8, 2011	36.2%	28.4%	9.7%	25.7%
China Times	October 1, 2011	37.9%	31.6%	13.4%	17.1%
China Times	October 10, 2011	38.0%	30.6%	13.2%	18.2%
China Times	October 11, 2011	38.9%	31.4%	12.0%	17.7%
Focus Survey and Research	October 12, 2011	37.0%	30.5%	13.3%	19.2%
China Times	October 12, 2011	40.0%	31.0%	11.4%	17.6%
TVBS News	October 12, 2011	38%	34%	15%	13%
China Times	October 13, 2011	39.7%	30.3%	12.6%	17.4%
China Times	October 14, 2011	39.0%	31.4%	11.7%	17.9%
United Daily News	October 15, 2011	43%	32%	11%	14%
China Times	October 15, 2011	39.5%	32.7%	11.3%	16.5%
Taipei University of Education	October 15, 2011	34.0%	26.4%	10.2%	29.4%
China Times	October 16, 2011	39.9%	32.5%	10.3%	17.3%
China Times	October 17, 2011	40.9%	32.4%	11.0%	15.7%
China Times	October 18, 2011	42.0%	33.7%	9.4%	14.9%
China Times	October 11, 2011	43.7%	33.7%	9.1%	13.5%
China Times	October 20, 2011	42.0%	34.8%	9.3%	13.8%
TVBS News	October 20, 2011	43%	35%	12%	10%
I-tel Survey and Research	October 21, 2011	43.72%	42.95%	13.33%	—
China Times	October 21, 2011	42.3%	35.1%	9.7%	12.9%
China Times	October 22, 2011	42.3%	35.8%	9.4%	12.5%
China Times	October 23, 2011	41.6%	36.3%	10.6%	11.5%
China Times	October 24, 2011	40.6%	36.9%	10.6%	11.9%
China Times	October 25, 2011	42.1%	37.0%	10.1%	10.8%
Liberty Times	October 26, 2011	31.91%	30.28%	11.13%	26.67%
TVBS News	October 26, 2011	42%	33%	13%	12%
China Times	October 26, 2011	42.1%	37.5%	9.5%	10.9%
China Times	October 27, 2011	42.2%	37.4%	8.5%	11.9%
China Times	October 28, 2011	41.3%	38.0%	8.3%	12.4%
China Times	October 21, 2011	42.1%	37.0%	9.3%	11.6%
Decision Making Research	October 21, 2011	32.2%	35.9%	13.7%	18.2%
China Times	October 30, 2011	41.3%	37.1%	10.0%	11.6%
China Times	October 31, 2011	41.8%	36.0%	10.4%	11.8%
TVBS News	October 31, 2011	39%	33%	9%	20%
China Times	November 1, 2011	41.3%	35.8%	11.0%	11.9%
China Times	November 2, 2011	42.0%	33.8%	11.4%	12.8%
Focus Survey and Research	November 2, 2011	38.0%	30.7%	9.7%	21.6%
TVBS News	November 3, 2011	38%	35%	14%	13%
China Times	November 3, 2011	41.2%	35.3%	11.3%	12.2%
Master Survey and Research	November 4, 2011	39.5%	38.6%	12.9%	9.1%
China Times	November 4, 2011	42.0%	35.6%	10.6%	11.8%
China Times	November 5, 2011	41.4%	37.3%	10.1%	11.2%
China Times	November 6, 2011	41.7%	38.2%	10.4%	9.7%
Gallup Market Research	November 6, 2011	32.4%	25.6%	8.2%	33.8%
Focus Survey and Research	November 7, 2011	35.0%	33.2%	13.1%	18.7%
China Times	November 7, 2011	42.3%	39.1%	9.7%	8.9%
China Times	November 8, 2011	42.0%	39.3%	9.3%	9.4%
Liberty Times	November 1, 2011	33.58%	32.97%	11.17%	22.27%
China Times	November 1, 2011	41.4%	38.5%	10.3%	9.8%
TVBS News	November 10, 2011	39%	38%	9%	14%
China Times	November 10, 2011	41.6%	38.1%	10.7%	9.6%
China Times	November 11, 2011	41.6%	38.3%	9.5%	10.6%
United Daily News	November 12, 2011	41%	36%	9%	13%
China Times	November 14, 2011	41.2%	39.0%	9.4%	10.4%
China Times	November 15, 2011	42.4%	38.1%	9.5%	10.0%
TVBS News	November 16, 2011	39%	39%	9%	12%
China Times	November 16, 2011	43.3%	37.9%	9.1%	9.7%
China Times	November 17, 2011	43.4%	37.6%	9.4%	9.6%
Taipei University of Education	November 18, 2011	37.2%	30.2%	7.7%	24.9%
China Times	November 18, 2011	43.2%	37.6%	10.0%	9.2%
Master Survey and Research	November 18, 2011	38.7%	39.6%	11.7%	10.0%
Decision Making Research	November 20, 2011	33.5%	40.1%	11.2%	15.2%
China Times	November 21, 2011	44.7%	36.8%	9.7%	8.8%
China Times	November 22, 2011	43.6%	38.7%	9.8%	7.9%
Liberty Times	November 23, 2011	33.39%	35.79%	9.80%	21.02%
Focus Survey and Research	November 23, 2011	39.0%	35.8%	9.9%	14.8%
China Times	November 23, 2011	42.0%	39.8%	9.4%	8.8%
TVBS News	November 23, 2011	40%	38%	7%	15%
China Times	November 24, 2011	40.7%	40.3%	10.3%	8.7%
China Times	November 25, 2011	42.6%	39.2%	9.3%	8.9%
United Daily News	November 27, 2011	41%	35%	10%	14%
China Times	November 28, 2011	42.7%	37.6%	9.5%	10.2%
YouGov Market Research	November 28, 2011	34%	26%	10%	30%
China Times	November 29, 2011	43.0%	35.2%	8.4%	13.4%
China Times	November 30, 2011	41.8%	35.1%	8.3%	14.8%
Focus Survey and Research	November 30, 2011	36.7%	32.1%	10.0%	21.2%
TVBS News	December 1, 2011	40%	34%	7%	19%
China Times	December 2, 2011	43.5%	36.1%	7.0%	13.4%
China Times	December 2, 2011	43.4%	37.5%	7.7%	11.4%
TVBS News	December 3, 2011	38%	32%	12%	18%
United Daily News	December 3, 2011	39%	32%	10%	17%
Apple Daily	December 3, 2011	47.04%	36.90%	12.11%	3.95%
China Times	December 3, 2011	39.9%	32.6%	8.9%	18.6%
Focus Survey and Research	December 5, 2011	39.0%	32.9%	7.0%	21.2%
China Times	December 5, 2011	43.7%	37.2%	8.3%	10.8%
Shih Hsin University	December 5, 2011	33.9%	28.6%	8.3%	30.7%
China Times	December 6, 2011	42.0%	36.9%	9.8%	11.3%
China Times	December 7, 2011	43.2%	36.3%	9.0%	11.5%
Taipei University of Education	December 7, 2011	35.5%	27.7%	7.2%	29.6%
TVBS News	December 7, 2011	41%	37%	8%	14%
Master Survey and Research	December 8, 2011	35.4%	35.9%	10.8%	17.9%
China Times	December 8, 2011	43.9%	35.9%	8.9%	11.3%
China Times	December 9, 2011	43.2%	36.4%	8.7%	11.7%
TVBS News	December 10, 2011	39%	39%	6%	16%
China Times	December 10, 2011	42.7%	35.1%	7.1%	15.1%
United Daily News	December 10, 2011	40%	33%	10%	16%
United Daily News	December 12, 2011	42%	35%	10%	13%
China Times	December 12, 2011	41.3%	36.8%	8.4%	13.5%
Focus Survey and Research	December 12, 2011	36.3%	36.0%	5.9%	20.1%
China Times	December 13, 2011	40.1%	39.1%	8.0%	12.8%
TVBS News	December 14, 2011	40%	38%	7%	15%
China Times	December 14, 2011	39.7%	38.7%	8.2%	13.4%
Liberty Times	December 15, 2011	34.50%	33.26%	10.81%	21.43%
China Times	December 15, 2011	41.8%	37.1%	8.2%	13.8%
China Times	December 16, 2011	41.8%	36.7%	8.2%	14.2%
TVBS News	December 17, 2011	40%	36%	7%	17%
China Times	December 17, 2011	38.5%	37.7%	7.7%	16%
United Daily News	December 17, 2011	41%	33%	10%	15%
China Times	December 19, 2011	41.9%	37.3%	7.2%	13.6%
Focus Survey and Research	December 19, 2011	36.5%	33.4%	8.5%	21.6%
China Times	December 20, 2011	42.2%	36.8%	7.4%	13.6%
China Times	December 21, 2011	42.3%	37.1%	6.6%	14.0%
Taipei University of Education	December 21, 2011	40.2%	32.2%	5.5%	22.1%
China Times	December 22, 2011	42.3%	36.0%	7.0%	14.7%
Liberty Times	December 22, 2011	35.77%	35.05%	9.70%	19.48%
TVBS	December 22, 2011	41%	35%	8%	16%
China Times	December 23, 2011	42.2%	36.2%	6.8%	14.8%
Master Survey and Research	December 24, 2011	39.5%	39.1%	11.1%	10.3%
Decision Making Research	December 24, 2011	38.3%	40.4%	7.3%	14.0%
China Times	December 26, 2011	41.3%	37.1%	7.5%	14.1%
China Times	December 26, 2011	41.6%	36.8%	6.8%	14.8%
Trendspotting Survey and Research	December 26, 2011	33.3%	29.0%	7.0%	30.7%
TVBS News	December 27, 2011	44%	38%	6%	12%
China Times	December 27, 2011	40.7%	38.0%	7.7%	13.6%
China Times	December 28, 2011	41.3%	38.5%	6.6%	13.6%
TVBS News	December 29, 2011	44%	35%	7%	13%
Focus Survey and Research	December 29, 2011	37.6%	31.5%	6.6%	24.4%
Focus Survey and Research	December 30, 2011	35.9%	32.6%	7.3%	24.4%
Taipei University of Education	December 30, 2011	42.2%	35.7%	6.2%	15.9%
Focus Survey and Research	December 31, 2011	37.1%	33.3%	6.9%	22.7%
Master Survey and Research	December 31, 2011	38.8%	37.8%	11.6%	11.8%
Focus Survey and Research	January 1, 2011	37.2%	33.1%	7.2%	22.5%
United Daily News	January 2, 2012	44%	36%	7%	13%
China Times	January 2, 2012	39.5	36.5%	5.8%	18.2%
Focus Survey and Research	January 2, 2012	37.2%	33.1%	7.2%	22.5%
TVBS News	January 2, 2012	45%	37%	6%	13%
China Times	January 2, 2012	43.3%	38.4%	6.8%	11.5%

== Television debates performance rating ==
Note that the percentages reflect the proportion of valid respondents who rated a particular candidate as performing the best during the presidential and vice-presidential television debates.

=== Presidential debates ===
Forecast Source	Date of Release	Ma Ying-jeou	Tsai Ing-wen	James Soong	Undecided
China Times	December 3, 2011	31.7%	29.8%	13.6%	24.9%
Apple Daily	December 3, 2011	47.61%	35.49%	14.37%	2.53%
United Daily News	December 3, 2011	39%	25%	15%	6%
TVBS News	December 3, 2011	30%	27%	20%	23%
Shih Hsin University	December 3, 2011	30.5%	31.0%	14.5%	24.1%
China Times	December 17, 2011	29.1%	32.1%	12.5%	26.3%
United Daily News	December 17, 2011	36%	29%	17%	4%
TVBS News	December 17, 2011	28%	33%	15%	24%
Focus Survey and Research	December 19, 2011	33.9%	37.7%	14.1%	14.3%
I-tel Survey and Research	December 20, 2011	40.10%	50.61%	9.29%	－

=== Vice-presidential debates ===
Forecast Source	Date of Release	Wu Den-yih	Su Jia-chyuan	Lin Ruey-shiung	Undecided
China Times	December 10, 2011	35.3%	33.7%	4.4%	26.6%
TVBS News	December 10, 2011	38%	39%	6%	17%
United Daily News	December 10, 2011	40%	30%	9%	5%
Focus Survey and Research	December 12, 2011	33.8%	38.4%	6.5%	21.3%

== Election forecasting ==
=== Polling firm forecasts ===
Forecast Source	Date of Release	Voter Turnout	Tsai Ing-wen	Ma Ying-jeou	James Soong
Global Views Survey and Research	June 15, 2011	75.3%	51.8%	48.2%	—
Global Views Survey and Research	June 22, 2011	—	53.2%	46.8%	—
Democratic Progressive Party	July 27, 2011	75%	50.1%	49.9%	—
Global Views Survey and Research	August 16, 2011	—	53%	47%	—
Global Views Survey and Research	October 12, 2011	—	52%	48%	—
China Times	November 1, 2011	—	41%	47%	12%
Gallup Market Research	November 6, 2011	—	43.1%	44.2%	12.8%
China Times	November 10, 2011	—	42.2%	46.0%	11.8%
TVBS News	November 10, 2011	76.8%	47.3%	45.8%	6.9%
Gallup Market Research	December 1, 2011	－	42.16%	46.13%	11.71%
TVBS News	December 7, 2011	78.9%	47%	48%	5%
Gallup Market Research	December 14, 2011	－	41.6%	48.2%	10.3%
TVBS News	December 22, 2011	80.3%	46%	48%	6%
TVBS News	December 29, 2011	77.9%	45%	50%	5%
Democratic Progressive Party	January 2, 2012	79%	48%	47%	5%

=== Prediction market forecasts ===
Note that as the election forecast reports released by the National Chengchi University are based on models that involve the use of prediction markets as raw data, as opposed to opinion polling, the percentages may not add up to 100%.

Forecast Source	Date of Release	Tsai Ing-wen	Ma Ying-jeou	James Soong
National Chengchi University	April 27, 2011	50.5%	49.9%	—
National Chengchi University	May 4, 2011	50.6%	47.9%	—
National Chengchi University	May 20, 2011	51.3%	48.0%	—
National Chengchi University	June 13, 2011	50.9%	48.4%	—
National Chengchi University	August 1, 2011	46.8%	49.4%	—
National Chengchi University	August 8, 2011	46.3%	48.2%	—
National Chengchi University	August 15, 2011	45.7%	48.5%	—
National Chengchi University	August 29, 2011	49.4%	50.3%	—
National Chengchi University	September 9, 2011	47.9%	51.4%	—
National Chengchi University	September 27, 2011	47.2%	49.5%	—
National Chengchi University	October 11, 2011	46.2%	51.5%	—
National Chengchi University	October 21, 2011	49.2%	49.6%	—
National Chengchi University	October 26, 2011	49.6%	49.6%	—
National Chengchi University	November 1, 2011	48.9%	48.4%	4.4%
National Chengchi University	November 7, 2011	49.5%	48.3%	7.5%
National Chengchi University	November 11, 2011	49.9%	46.1%	7.5%
National Chengchi University	November 15, 2011	49.5%	46.1%	8.4%
National Chengchi University	November 17, 2011	50.0%	46.1%	8.1%
National Chengchi University	November 22, 2011	48.6%	44.1%	8.2%
National Chengchi University	November 28, 2011	50.0%	43.2%	10.1%
National Chengchi University	December 2, 2011	49.9%	41.9%	11.7%
National Chengchi University	December 4, 2011	50.1%	42.1%	10.8%
National Chengchi University	December 7, 2011	50.1%	42.6%	11.2%
National Chengchi University	December 11, 2011	50.3%	41.6%	10.9%
National Chengchi University	December 16, 2011	51.7%	41.4%	9.1%
National Chengchi University	December 18, 2011	51.9%	41.6%	8.6%
National Chengchi University	December 21, 2011	51.3%	42.0%	8.3%
National Chengchi University	December 26, 2011	50.4%	43.0%	7.7%
National Chengchi University	December 29, 2011	50.5%	44.1%	7.4%
National Chengchi University	January 2, 2012	50.3%	43.6%	10.1%
National Chengchi University	January 3, 2012	49.8%	42.6%	10.7%

=== Election forecast maps ===
Forecast Source	National Chengchi University	National Chengchi University	National Chengchi University
Date of Release	September 9, 2011	September 27, 2011	November 11, 2011
Forecast Map			
Date of Release	November 17, 2011	December 16, 2011	December 21, 2011
Forecast Map			
Forecast Source	National Chengchi University	National Chengchi University	National Chengchi University
Date of Release	December 26, 2011	January 2, 2012	January 3, 2012
Forecast Map			
Legend	Municipalities, counties and cities where Tsai Ing-Wen is forecast to lead. Municipalities, counties and cities where Ma Ying-Jeou is forecast to lead. Municipalities, counties and cities where James Soong is forecast to lead.		
