= The Sunday Guardian =

Indian Sunday newspaper

- The 19 May 2013, front page
- Type: Weekly newspaper
- Format: Broadsheet
- Founder: M. J. Akbar
- Publisher: ITV Network
- Language: English
- Headquarters: New Delhi
- Sister newspapers: The Daily Guardian
- OCLC number: 801791742
- Website: sundayguardianlive.com

The Sunday Guardian is an Indian Sunday newspaper, founded by journalist and politician M. J. Akbar and edited by Joyeeta Basu. It is owned by iTV Network, which also runs the India News and NewsX channels. It was launched on 31 January 2010 from New Delhi and is printed in New Delhi, Mumbai and Chandigarh. The 40-page newspaper is divided into two sections of 20 pages each: The Sunday Guardian and Guardian 20. Together, they offer a mix of news, investigation, opinion, entertainment, lifestyle and issues of human interest.

== Notable columnists ==
- M.J. Akbar
- M.D. Nalapat
- Cleo Paskal
