= Ruposhi Bangla (disambiguation) =

Ruposhi Bangla (lit. 'Beautiful Bengali') may refer to:

- Ruposhi Bangla, a collection of Bengali poems by Indian poet Jibanananda Das
- Ruposhi Bangla (TV channel), a Bengali-language entertainment channel in Kolkata, India

== See also ==
- Rupashi Bangla Express, a superfast train that runs between Santragachi Junction and Purulia Junction in India
