= Next TV =

Taiwanese television station

Next TV Broadcasting Limited 壹電視廣播股份有限公司
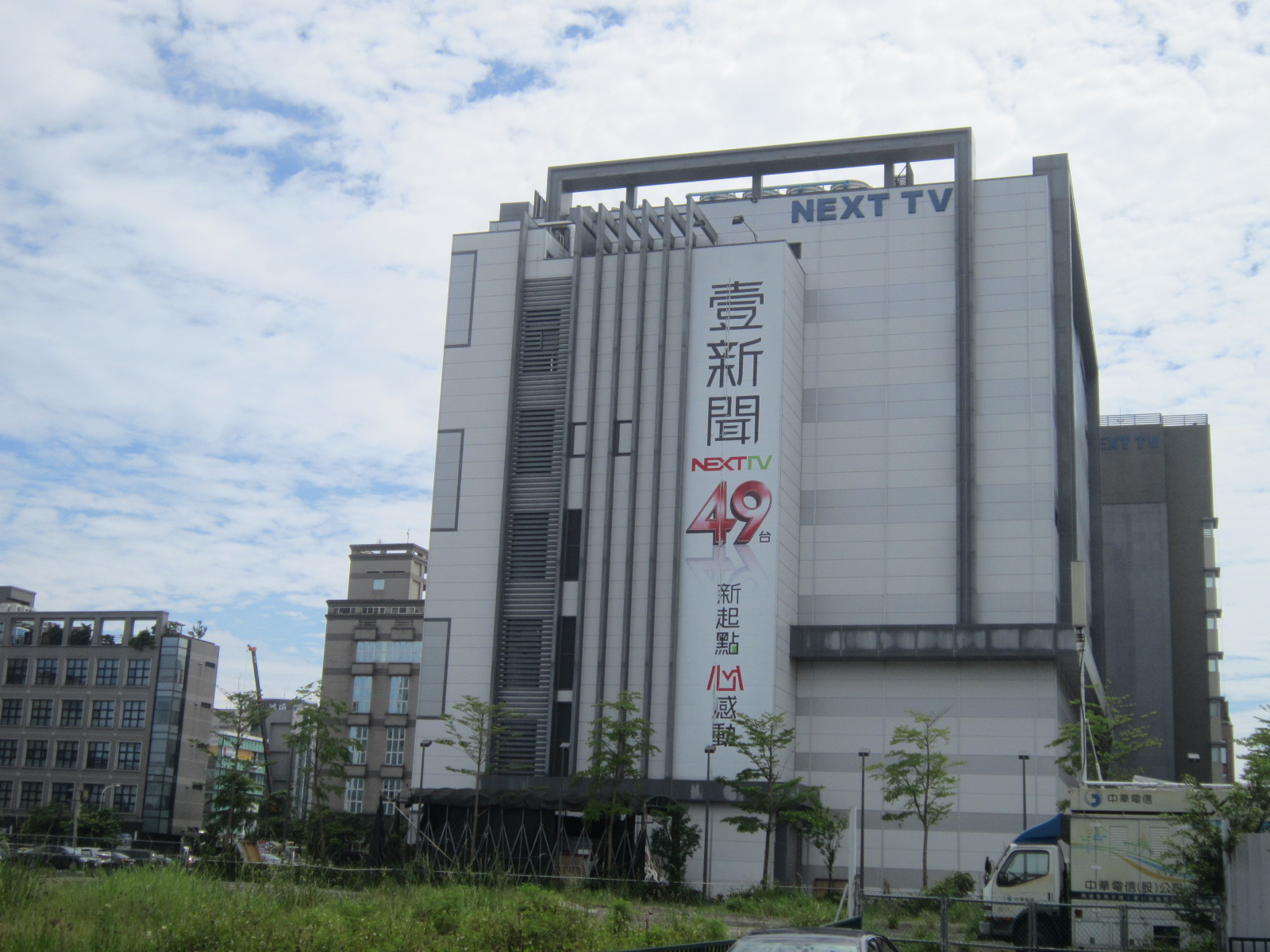
- The Next TV headquarters building located in the Neihu District of Taipei City.
- Type: Free-to-air nationwide TV
- Branding: Next TV
- Founded: July 7, 2009 by Jimmy Lai
- Broadcast area: Taiwan
- Owner: Former: Next Media (2010–2013); Current: ERA Communications Inc. (2013–present)
- Official website: https://www.nexttv.com.tw

Next TV (Chinese: 壹電視; officially Next TV Broadcasting Limited) is a Taiwanese television broadcaster. It was founded on July 7, 2009, and officially launched on December 28, 2010. It was the first nationwide television network in Taiwan to broadcast all of its channels entirely in high definition (HD).

Initially established by Next Media, the company was acquired by the ERA Communications Inc in June 2013. The network currently operates three main channels: Next TV News channel, a general entertainment channel, and a movie channel. All of its original programming is produced and broadcast in high definition.

== History ==
=== Next Media (2010-2013) ===
Next TV was formally established on July 7, 2009, after Next Media received approval for its establishment from the Ministry of Economic Affairs (MOEA) of the Republic of China (Taiwan). It

s headquarters were located in Neihu District, Taipei City, the same location as the《Apple Daily (Taiwan)》 headquarters.

On August 13, 2009, Next Media submitted an application to the National Communications Commission (NCC) to establish five channels:「News Channel」、「General Information Channel」、「Entertainment Channel」、「Movie Channel」, and a sports channel.

On July 30, 2010, Next TV began trial broadcasting (soft launch) on its official website. The first program aired was the hour-long《Evening News》.

On July 20, 2011, Next Media Chairman Jimmy Lai personally attended the National Communications Commission (NCC) to elaborate on the application for the Next TV News Channel license and presented seven major commitments. The NCC conditionally approved the application for the satellite broadcasting license for the news channel.

Next TV Finance Channel officially launched on August 22, 2011.

On March 2, 2012, the Next TV Finance Channel ceased broadcasting without prior notice. Next TV stated the channel was shut down due to financial losses.

On May 23, 2012, the NCC approved the application for the satellite broadcasting license for the Next TV Variety Channel.

The Next TV Americas Channel officially ceased broadcasting on October 6, 2012.

On October 1, 2012, Next Media Taiwan proceeded with phased lay-offs. Next Media Entertainment cut 204 staff members, and Next TV laid off 300 staff members, totaling 504 people. Jimmy Lai, in his personal capacity, signed a Memorandum of Understanding (MOU) with Lian Taisheng（練台生）, Chairman of Era Television, for the transfer of Next TV's operating rights, with an expected effective date of January 1, 2013.

On June 1, 2013, the acquisition of Next TV by Lian Taisheng was completed. The Next TV News Channel was scheduled to begin broadcasting on Taiwan's nationwide cable Channel 45 as early as mid-June.

=== ERA Communications (2013-Now) ===
On June 25, 2013, Next TV replaced the red Apple logo used during the Next Media era with the text "壹電視 NEXTTV" formally separating from Next Media Broadcasting Communications.

On November 20, 2013, the NCC formally approved the acquisition of Next TV by Eric Lan (Lian Taisheng), Chairman of ERA Communications. Lian Taisheng promised to incorporate six major commitments into Next TV's operating guidelines, subject to NCC supervision. These commitments included independent operation of the ethics committee, staff replenishment, separation between Era Television and Next TV, establishment of independent editorial and hiring mechanisms, maintenance of external diversity for the news channel, and the creation of guidelines for self-involved incidents. Lian Taisheng also pledged to strive to relinquish channel agency rights for FTV News by the end of 2014, and for SET News by the end of 2015.

On December 30, 2013, Next Media issued an announcement in Hong Kong stating that it had received formal approval from the Investment Commission (IC) of Taiwan's Ministry of Economic Affairs (MOEA) to transfer its 45% stake in Next TV to Lian Taisheng. The transaction was completed on the same day, and Next Media ceased to hold any shares in Next TV.

Effective January 1, 2014, the Next TV News Channel changed its fixed position on Taiwan's cable television to Channel 49, moving from its previous position on Channel 45.

Next TV Movie Channel officially relaunched on January 1, 2015.

The channel remains in operation today.

== Next TV Channels ==
Next TV News Logo

Next TV Program Logo

Next TV currently operates three commercial cable television channels:

=== Current channels ===
- Next TV News (Chinese: 壹電視新聞台)
- Next TV Variety (Chinese: 壹電視綜合台)
- Next TV Movie (Chinese: 壹電視電影台)

=== Defunct channels ===
- Next TV Finance (Chinese: 壹電視財經台)
- Next TV Americas (Chinese: 壹電視美洲台)

== See also ==
- List of Taiwanese television series
- Era Television
- Jimmy Lai
- Next Digital
