= Dhoom Music =

Bengali music channel

- Country: India
- Broadcast area: India
- Headquarters: Kolkata, West Bengal, India

Programming
- Language: Bengali
- Picture format: 576i SDTV

Ownership
- Owner: PTC Network
- Sister channels: Ruposhi Bangla; News Time Bangla; PTC Punjabi; PTC Chak De; PTC News; PTC Music; PTC Simran; PTC Punjabi Gold; Vissa TV; Raj News Telugu; Raj Musix Telugu

History
- Launched: 19 December 2010; 15 years ago

Dhoom Music is an Indian Bengali-language music television channel launched in 2010. The channel broadcasts the songs of Bengali movies.

== Programming ==
- Jukebox
- Muzik @ 9
- Muzik @ 9:30
- Muzik @ 10
- Dhoom Live
- Muzik @ 17:30
- Muzik @ 18:45
- Muzik @ 20:30
