= Ruposhi Bangla (TV channel) =

Indian Bengali-language television channel

- Logo used since 2015
- Country: India
- Headquarters: Kolkata, India

Programming
- Picture format: 576i SDTV

Ownership
- Owner: PTC Network
- Sister channels: List: News Time Bangla; Dhoom Music; PTC News; PTC Punjabi; PTC Music; PTC Simran; PTC Chak De; PTC Punjabi Gold; Vissa TV; Raj Musix Telugu; Raj News Telugu; Kairali TV; Kairali News; Kairali WE; News7 Tamil

History
- Launched: 31 August 2009; 17 years ago

Links
- Website: www.ruposhibangla.in

Ruposhi Bangla is a Bengali-language entertainment channel which was launched on 31 August 2009 with shows ranging from reality to socio-mythology, feature films to news updates and from comedy to drama. The channel is a production of Brand Value Communications Limited, Kolkata. and prominently owned by PTC Network

== Former programming ==
=== Drama series ===
- Khelaghar
- Meera MBA: Kaajer Maye
- Sonarpur Local

=== Dubbed series ===
- Veer Shivaji
