= Next TV News =

Next TV News 壹電視新聞台
- Country: Taiwan
- Broadcast area: Taiwan
- Network: Next TV

Programming
- Picture format: HDTV, 1080i

Ownership
- Sister channels: Next TV Variety; Next TV Movie

History
- Launched: 30 July 2010

Links
- Website: https://www.nexttv.com.tw/NextTV/News/

Availability

Terrestrial
- Digital: DVB-T

Next TV News (Chinese: 壹電視新聞台) , a channel under Next TV, In 2010, the Next TV News Channel became the first news channel in Taiwan to entirely broadcast in High-Definition (HD) nationwide.

the Next TV News Channel began trial broadcasting (soft launch) on its official website at 7:00 PM on July 30, 2010. It officially launched on the group's set-top box platform on December 28 of the same year, and obtained its satellite broadcasting license on July 20, 2011.

On June 1, 2013, the acquisition of Next TV by ERA Communications was completed. The Next TV News Channel was scheduled to begin broadcasting on Taiwan's nationwide cable Channel 45 as early as mid-June.

In 2014, Next TV was allocated a fixed channel position on Taiwan's nationwide cable television, Channel 49.

The channel is currently available on multiple platforms, including Channel 506 of the Chunghwa Telecom MOD (CHT MOD) IPTV service, Taiwan's cable television systems (Channel 49), and via live streaming through dedicated Next TV News Channel apps for both iOS and Android operating systems.

== See also ==
- Media of Taiwan
- Next TV
- Next Media
- Era Television
- ERA Communications
