= Cleo Paskal =

Canadian journalist

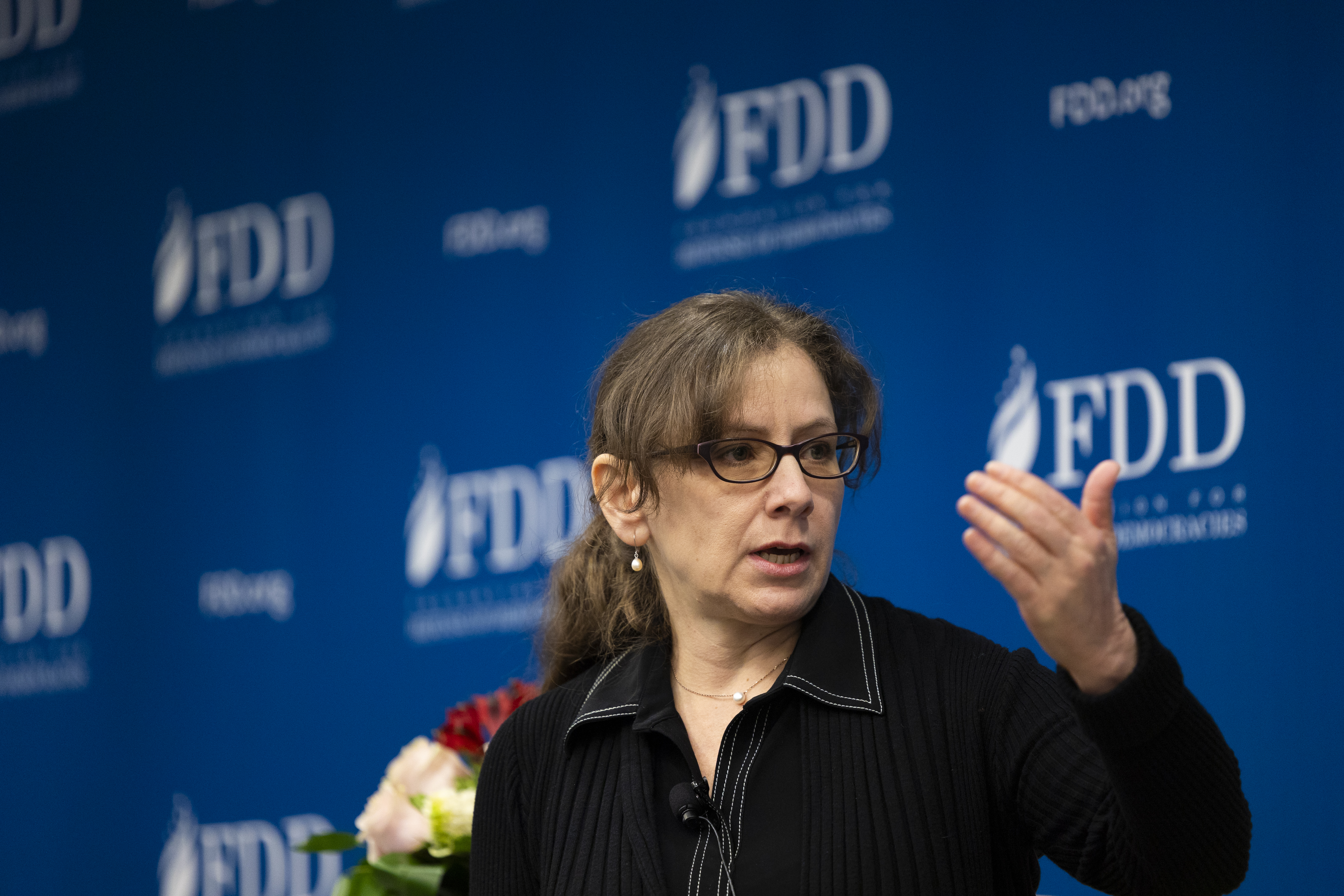
Cleo Paskal, seated, speaking at a forum

Cleo Paskal is a journalist and a Research Fellow at the Future Security Initiative, Arizona State University and a Senior Fellow in Indo-Pacific Studies at the American Foreign Policy Council. She has been Non-Resident Senior Fellow for the Indo-Pacific at the Foundation for Defense of Democracies, and is on the International Board of Advisors of the Kalinga Institute of Indo-Pacific Studies and the Global Counter-Terrorism Council. She has won more than a dozen awards for her journalism and travel writing.

== Biography ==
Paskal specializes in Chinese Communist Party Political warfare strategies and techniques, strategic issues in the Indo-Pacific and the research and framing of the Central Pacific being the 'geographical pivot of history' for the United States.

Paskal has testified before Congress multiple times as well as before the House of Lords on the agreement between the United Kingdom and Mauritius over the Chagos Archipelago. From 2006 to 2022, she was an Associate Fellow at Chatham House (a.k.a. Royal Institute of International Affairs), where she led the "Geostrategic outlook for the Indo-Pacific 2019-2024" and other projects. She led a multi-year research project based at the Centre d'études et de recherches internationales de l'Université de Montréal (CÉRIUM) looking at strategic shifts in the Indo-Pacific. She was a visiting fellow at Gateway House (Indian Council on Global Relations) in 2019.

Paskal has contributed chapters to peer-reviewed academic books. She has also contributed to many publications, including Naval War College Review, Journal of Indo-Pacific Affairs (Air Force), Washington Examiner, Pacific Island Times, The Diplomat, The Economist, The World Today, Conde Nast Traveller, The Independent, The Telegraph, The Times, Chicago Tribune, Australian Financial Review, New Zealand Herald, The Farmer's Almanac, Lonely Planet, and the Sunday Times. She has hosted BBC radio shows. She is a Sunday Guardian columnist and has written columns for the Canadian Broadcasting Corporation, National Post, and the Toronto Star.

At McGill University, she co-founded a satire magazine, The Red Herring. She wrote the Primetime Emmy Award-winning TV series Cirque du Soleil: Fire Within.
