= PTC News =

Indian Punjabi-language TV news channel

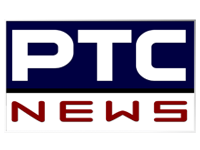
- Country: India
- Broadcast area: Global
- Network: PTC Network
- Headquarters: Mohali, Punjab

Programming
- Language: Punjabi
- Picture format: 480i (NTSC); 576i (PAL)

Ownership
- Owner: Sukhbir Singh Badal
- Key people: Rabindra Narayan (MD & President)
- Sister channels: PTC Punjabi; Rupashi Bangla; News Time Bangla; PTC Music; PTC Chak De; Dhoom Music; PTC Punjabi Gold; PTC Simran; News7 Tamil; Vissa TV; Raj News Telugu; Raj Musix Telugu; Kairali TV; Kairali WE; Kairali News

History
- Launched: January 2007

Links
- Website: www.ptcnews.tv

PTC News is a Punjabi language news channel. Indian politician and Shiromani Akali Dal president Sukhbir Singh Badal holds a majority stake in PTC. The channel's official corporate headquarters is in Mohali (Punjab) and has a production studio in Delhi. It broadcasts over all cable networks and DTH platforms in India. On Dish Network & Sling in the United States, Bell, Rogers, Shaw, and Telus in Canada, and on IPTV and Yupp TV worldwide.
