= Next TV Variety =

Television channel of Taiwan

Next TV Variety 壹電視綜合台
- Country: Taiwan
- Broadcast area: Taiwan
- Network: Next TV

Programming
- Picture format: HDTV, 1080i

Ownership
- Sister channels: Next TV News; Next TV Movie

History
- Launched: 28 December 2010

Links
- Website: https://www.nexttv.com.tw/NextTV/NextTVProgram/

Availability

Terrestrial
- Digital: DVB-T

Next TV Variety (Chinese: 壹電視綜合台) , a channel under Next TV in Taiwan.

It officially launched on the group's set-top box platform on December 28, 2010. of the same year, and obtained its satellite broadcasting license on May 23, 2012.

The channel was initially available on Channel 49 of the Chunghwa Telecom MOD (CHT MOD) IPTV service.

On June 1, 2013, the acquisition of Next TV by ERA Communications was completed.

On November 1, 2017, CHT MOD adjusted the channel allocation for all its services, and the Next TV Variety Channel was repositioned to Channel 312.

The channel does not have a single fixed channel position across all cable television operators nationwide; it is instead allocated to various positions, including Channel 79, 85, 89, 104, 129, and 130, depending on the service provider.

== See also ==
- Media of Taiwan
- Next TV
- Next TV News
- Next Media
- Era Television
- ERA Communications
