= SET iNews =

SET iNews Channel
- Country: Taiwan
- Broadcast area: Taiwan (cable TV); Worldwide (online only)
- Network: Sanlih E-Television
- Headquarters: Taiwan

Ownership
- Sister channels: SET News

History
- Launched: 3 May 2011 (14 years, 84 days) (as SET Finance); 26 June 2017 (8 years, 30 days) (as SET iNews)
- Former names: SET Finance (三立財經台, Sānlì Cáijīng-tái)

Links
- Website: setn.com

Availability

Streaming media
- YouTube: Live streaming

SET iNews Channel (Chinese: 三立iNEWS; pinyin: Sānlì iNEWS) is a Taiwanese 24-hour news channel, broadcasting predominantly in Mandarin, owned by Sanlih E-Television and launched in May 2011 as SET Finance (Chinese: 三立財經台; pinyin: Sānlì Cáijīng-tái), switching to its current name on 26 June 2017. It is a sister channel of SET News, launched in 1998.

Compared to SET News, whose format is general news, SET iNews broadcasts more financial and slightly more international news. Nevertheless, both channels share resources, including reporters and presenters, and, until mid-2021, especially during off-peak hours (late night and early mornings, as well as weekends), simulcast and/or repeated some programming premiered in the other network. This practice ended as part of SET iNews move to channel 48 on some operators: since August 2021 SET iNews starts its weekend live newscasts at 07:00 local time (before that, it simulcast SET iNews from 07:00 to 09:00 local time, aired a repeat of a night talk show, and started live newscasts at 11:00) and canceled the simulcast of sister channel SET News weekend midnight newscast, replacing it since July 2021 with a repeat of its own 19:00 newscast.

Both SET iNews and sister channel SET News are considered media outlets leaning towards the Pan-Green coalition.

== Move to channel 48 ==
On 26 May 2021, the National Communications Commission (NCC) announced SET iNews will move to Channel 48 in a number of cable systems, after filing an application in April 2020. SET iNews will have to reduce the simulcast of content from sister channel SET News from 20% to 10%, position itself as a network with a different focus, namely financial news and financial programmes—even comprehensive talk programs should be mainly of financial nature; and hire financial experts and scholars to join the ethics committee. By 2024, SET iNews will have to invest around 200 million TWD to supplement its workforce and improve its content. This change would allow SET iNews to reach 25% of cable TV subscribers.

== Programming ==
As of late August 2021, SET iNews operates on a 69-hour live newscast programming schedule per week: weekdays 07:00-10:00, 11:00-14:00, and 16:00-21:00 local time, and weekends 07:00-09:00, 12:00-14:00, and 17:00-20:00 local time. Night periods are programmed with recorded talk shows (weeknights from 21:00 to 01:00, weekends from 21:00 to 23:00); overnight repeats start at 01:00 on weekdays and at 00:00 on weekends, ending at 07:00 every day. The weekday noon newscast is repeated at 15:00 the same day. The weekend schedule when no live newscast airs is filled with prerecorded weekly journalistic programmes, some of them rerun in the 10:00 time slot on weekdays.
