= Hornbill TV =

English–Nagamese language news channel based in Nagaland

- Country: India
- Broadcast area: India and rest of world
- Headquarters: Chümoukedima District 797103, India

Programming
- Languages: English; Nagamese
- Picture format: 16:9 (576i, SDTV feed)

Ownership
- Owner: Pure Entertainment Group

History
- Launched: 29 January 2021; 5 years ago

Links
- Webcast: Watch TV
- Website: hornbilltv.com

Availability

Streaming media
- Jio: Jio TV

Hornbill TV is a 24-hour news television channel headquartered at Chümoukedima in the Indian state of Nagaland. The channel features news reports, feature stories and interviews by Hornbill News correspondents and reporters covering events around Nagaland.

== Background ==
It is the first satellite TV channel in Nagaland. The channel is run by Pure Entertainment Group and broadcasts news in English and Nagamese, current affair programme and talk shows.

Hornbill TV also publishes contents through its official social media sites such as Facebook, Instagram, X (Twitter) and YouTube.

== History ==
Hornbill TV was first conceptualized in 2020. The channel was launched on 29 January 2021.
