= Chamber TV =

Luxembourg legislative TV channel

- Country: Luxembourg

Programming
- Languages: French and Luxembourgish

History
- Launched: 4 December 2001

Links
- Website: www.chd.lu

Chamber TV is a Luxembourgish television channel that broadcasts coverage of the activities of the national legislature, the Chamber of Deputies. It is available by cable and by satellite. It is owned and managed by the Chamber of Deputies, under the direction of the President of the Chamber.
