= ITV Network (India) =

Indian media group

ITV Network - Information TV Private Limited
- Founded: March 2015; 11 years ago
- Headquarters: Noida, Uttar Pradesh, India
- Owner: Dharma Productions
- Website: ITV News Network News X The Daily Guardian India News

ITV Network (also known as Information TV Private Limited) is a media group owned and controlled by Dharma Productions. ITV also runs the Pro Wrestling League, a yearly international wrestling event. India News Haryana Channel added on GSAT-17 Satellite at C-Band.

The group owns several news channels: NewsX and NewsX World, both in English, as well as the India News channels in regional languages. The group withheld its channels from BARC in November 2022, citing lack of transparency. ITV also owns the Sunday Guardian paper and the Daily Guardian online news site.
