= Parliamentary Broadcasting Unit =

Kenyan terrestrial television network

PBU
- Country: Kenya
- Broadcast area: Nationwide
- Headquarters: Nairobi

Programming
- Languages: English, Kiswahili
- Picture format: 480i (SDTV)

Ownership
- Owner: Parliament of Kenya
- Sister channels: Senate TV; Bunge TV

History
- Launched: June 2009

Parliamentary Broadcasting Unit (PBU) is a Kenyan terrestrial television network that was created in 2009 by the Parliament of Kenya with the assistance of the USAID with an aim to open up the democratic space. The PBU network televises live proceedings of both houses of parliament. The PBU network includes two television channels: Bunge TV, which broadcasts live sessions of the National Assembly covering Nairobi and parts of neighbouring counties, and Senate TV, which broadcasts live sessions of the Senate covering Nairobi and parts of neighbouring counties. Both channels are available on the Signet terrestrial free-to-air platform.

For nationwide coverage, PBU rides on the government owned TV Channel, KBC.
