= National Assembly TV =

Korean public-service television network

- Type: Legislature broadcaster
- Country: South Korea
- Broadcast area: Nationwide
- Headquarters: Korea National Assembly Proceeding Hall, Seoul

Programming
- Language: Korean
- Picture format: 1080p

Ownership
- Owner: National Assembly of South Korea

History
- Launched: December 28, 1991; 34 years ago (Founded); May 24, 2004; 22 years ago (On air)

Links
- Webcast: NATV On Air
- Website: www.natv.go.kr

National Assembly TV (NATV; Korean: 국회방송, romanized: Gughoebangsong) is a South Korean cable and satellite television network that was created in 1991 by the South Korean cable television industry as a nonprofit public service.

== Live broadcast ==
It provides a wide range of information on parliamentary activities, policy issues, and legislative information fairly, alongside live broadcasting of major meetings such as plenary sessions, committees, and hearings without editing. National Assembly TV is public broadcasting and is available to all South Korean paid broadcasting subscribers, reaching 98% of households with TVs.

== Program ==
The network organizes not only parliamentary broadcasts but also news programs including sign language three times a day, produces documentaries observing lawmakers' days, organizes political discussion programs for high school students, or organizes talk programs on books that have influenced lawmakers' lives.
