= China Xinhua News Network Corporation =

Chinese state media company

- Company type: Television network, Satellite television and Cable television
- Industry: Television Broadcasting
- Founded: December 31, 2009
- Headquarters: Beijing, China
- Area served: Worldwide
- Key people: Li Congjun (President); He Ping (Editor-in-Chief)
- Products: Television content, Television programming
- Owner: Government of China
- Parent: Xinhua News Agency
- Website: www.xinhuanet.com/2015wlds/enindex.htm

China Xinhua News Network Corporation
- Simplified Chinese: 中国新华新闻电视网
Transcriptions
Standard Mandarin
- Hanyu Pinyin: zhōng guó xīn huá xīn wén diàn shì wǎng

The China Xinhua News Network Corporation (CNC) is a state-owned television network subsidiary of Xinhua News Agency.

CNC owns and operates a TV news network and new media services. They are regarded as an attempt by China to enhance its global communications, develop its influence abroad and counter foreign media. In 2009, they began their 24-hour news channel broadcast in many countries all over the world. It plays a part in the Chinese government's attempt to show an international vision with a Chinese perspective as well as advocating Chinese nationalism. The news network is pro-Chinese government in its stance and often advocates on its behalf in areas such as foreign policy.

== History ==
Its opening ceremony came on December 31, 2009. The network began broadcasting CNC World on January 1, 2010, in the Asia-Pacific region and some European countries.

Until June 2016, Chinese and English CNC channels were accessible by satellite in about 200 countries in Asia-Pacific region, North America, Europe, the Middle East and Africa. Through its growth, it has been able to grow its media presence around the world. But because of this, many security agencies have been alarmed of its rapid growth.

In 2020, the United States Department of State designated Xinhua, along with other Chinese state media outlets, as foreign missions.

== Structure ==
=== CNC World ===
CNC World is a global, 24-hour, English language news channel, hoping to offer a better view of China to its international viewers. This was regarded as a logical step in the government's multi-billion-pound push for soft power. As China continues its expansion all over the world, they continue making their programme contents in more languages. The Chinese government has been using it as a method of one of the three main branches of reporting in China, and is self-censored through following Beijing's policies in order not to be shut down. One of Xinhua's biggest attractions is the fact that they subsidize coverage and operating costs across the world for their journalists.

=== CNC Chinese ===
The CNC Chinese Channel mainly covers Asia-Pacific and includes the United States, Australia, New Zealand, Southeast Asia, Hong Kong and other regions, with cable and wireless TV landing. It is considered to be a very influential news agency that can affect the views of the Chinese speaking communities abroad.

=== CNC Holdings Limited ===
CNC Holdings Limited (stock code:8356:HK), affiliated to CNC, is a Hong Kong–based investment holding company, chiefly engaged in the provision of waterworks engineering services. The company operates through three segments:

- Provision of waterworks engineering services
- Television broadcasting
- Large outdoor display screen advertisement

== Reception ==
Because the China Xinhua News Network Corporation is deeply involved with the Chinese state, it has been perceived as its mouthpiece abroad spreading Chinese propaganda and disinformation. In response, many nations have launched other public diplomacy media campaigns of their own. Xinhua has also aimed in creating partnerships among media corporations abroad. But because of China's strict media regulations, and lack of independence in journalistic tactics, and promote party and state agendas abroad. For example, as China aims to expand its influence in Africa, the Xinhua Corporation is seen as a vital source in creating pro-China media in the African continent.
