= CNC World =

- Country: China
- Broadcast area: Worldwide
- Network: Satellite & Cable television network
- Affiliates: Xinhua News Agency
- Headquarters: Beijing, China

Programming
- Language: English
- Picture format: 4:3/16:9 576i (SDTV)

Ownership
- Owner: China Xinhua News Network Corporation, private investors

History
- Launched: 1 July 2010

Links
- Website: www.xinhuanet.com/2015wlds/enindex.htm

Availability

Streaming media
- en.cncnews.cn

CNC World (simplified Chinese: 中国新华新闻电视网英语电视台; traditional Chinese: 中國新華新聞電視網英語電視台; pinyin: Zhōngguó Xīnhuá Xīnwén Diànshì Wǎng Yīngyǔ Diànshìtái) is a majority state-owned 24-hour global English-language news channel, launched on July 1, 2010. It is 51% owned by the state-run China Xinhua News Network Corporation, and 49% by private investors, including Chinese home appliances maker Gree.

The venture is part of Beijing's effort to "present an international vision with a Chinese perspective," Xinhua President Li Congjun said at the press conference announcing the launch of CNC World.

Xinhua has leased a newsroom in New York on top of a skyscraper in Times Square to provide CNC World with prominent exposure in the United States. On December 16, 2010, CNC World agreed a deal with Eutelsat for coverage on Eutelsat 28A, 36B and Hot Bird 13B from January 1, 2011.

In 2020, the United States Department of State designated Xinhua, along with other Chinese state media outlets, as foreign missions. By 2021, the network's terrestrial television affiliates in the United States had all disaffiliated with the network.
