= USS Hornbill =

USS Hornbill may refer to the following ships of the United States Navy:

- USS Hornbill (AMc-13), formerly J. A. Martinolich, was launched in 1938 by Martinolich Repair Basin, Tacoma, Washington
- USS Hornbill (AMS-19), launched as YMS-371, 27 November 1943 by Weaver Shipyards, Orange, Texas
