= Big J TV =

- Country: India
- Broadcast area: India
- Headquarters: Udupi

Programming
- Language(s): Marathi, Konkani, English, Kannada, Tulu, Tamil, Hindi, Malayalam
- Picture format: 576i (SDTV)

Links
- Website: http://bigjtv.org/

Big J TV is a 24-hour multilingual Christian evangelical television station based in Udupi.

== Programmes ==
- Divyavani
- Amrithavani
- Vonde Mrga Ministry
- Karuna Sadan Ministries

== See also ==
- Media in Karnataka
