= Nuova Televisione =

- Bologna; Italy

Programming
- Language: Italian
- Affiliations: Italian Communist Party

History
- Founded: July 28, 1982
- First air date: January 1, 1983
- Last air date: May 31, 1985

Nuova Televisione (NTV) was an Italian local television broadcaster located in Bologna, Emilia-Romagna, which broadcast between 1983 and 1985. It emerged as part of local television initiatives within the Italian Communist Party (Ital.: Partito Comunista Italiano, PCI), through a project supported by popular shareholding focused primarily on news and culture.

== History ==
=== Origins ===
NTV was founded on 28 July 1982, having its head office, management and administration at Via San Felice 26 in Bologna. According to archival documentation preserved by the Fondazione Gramsci Emilia-Romagna, the broadcaster was established through a broader popular shareholding project and with the involvement of the PCI.

NTV originated from Punto Radio TV, a broadcaster which after acquisition by the PCI in Bologna was terminated. NTV initially relied upon technical equipment and frequency allocations used previously by Punto Radio TV.

Sources differ on when NTV began broadcasting. The archival record of Città degli archivi suggests that February 1, 1983 marked the inception of the broadcaster. Programming schedules recovered from archives suggest that broadcasts occurred during the early days of January 1983. A contemporaneous report indicated that experimental broadcasts would occur from 20 January, with full broadcasts to commence from 18 February.

=== Organization and editorial policy ===
NTV positioned itself as a project by the political left, while stating that it was not intended to function as a direct party instrument. It relied heavily upon popular investment and featured prominent organizations, including the regional Italian General Confederation of Labour (CGIL). Its launch was associated with figures from the worlds of culture and entertainment, including Lucio Dalla, Cesare Zavattini, Dario Fo and Giorgio Zagnoni, as well as academics from the University of Bologna's DAMS department.

The program director was journalist Ennio Simeone, formerly deputy editor of Paese Sera, while Gian Pietro Testa was responsible for news services. Alfonso Racemoli later became the broadcaster's artistic director.

The main production studios were located at Via Barberia 15, in the former premises of TeleAppennino, while the registered office was at Via San Felice 26 in Bologna.

=== Programming ===
The initial program schedule offered by the NTV featured programs produced by Tele Capodistria. It subsequently developed its own schedule, consisting of news, public-service programs, sports, cultural programs, entertainment and fiction.

Documented programs included Ora per ora, a news program; L'aperitivo; Rotativa; Il videogiornale; Primo piano; Sport & sport; and Videoplastic. The schedule also included telephone-in programs featuring members of the public and experts, such as Salute senza ticket, Inquilini e proprietari, Tasse e tributi and Previdenza e pensioni.

Among the principal entertainment programs were La scala a chiocciola, a variety program combining games and commercial information hosted by Gilberto Rivelli; Video Mix, featuring quizzes, games and music requested by viewers. The schedule also included films, television series and cartoons.

The surviving schedules also document sports programs, election-related broadcasts and links with Tele Capodistria.

=== Coverage ===
NTV's reach extended beyond the Bologna area. Its signal covered much of Emilia-Romagna, as well as parts of southern Veneto and the northern Marche, including the areas around Fano and Pesaro. NTV's regional coverage was supported by agreements with Fin Inform, Valsambro Center and Videopress.

=== Closure and transition to Rete 7 ===
The finances of the organisation began deteriorating throughout the year of 1985. The amount of programming was progressively reduced, while some of the live programs involving telephone participation by viewers disappeared.

The last documented day of NTV programming was 31 May 1985. After the final news broadcast, NTV ceased broadcasting, and from the following day its frequencies were used by Rete 7, a broadcaster associated with the cooperative movement.

According to archival information, the transfer occurred in September 1985, coinciding with the absorption by Rete 7 of the broadcaster. The different dates may show the distinction between the end of broadcasting under the NTV name and the subsequent completion of the company's transfer arrangements.

== Archives ==
Archival material relating to NTV is kept as a discrete archive collection in the archives of the PCI provincial federation of Bologna. This includes 24 archival boxes and 29 archival folders containing administrative records, staffing information, program schedules, press releases and correspondence concerning the broadcaster.
