= SET News =

Cable news channel in Taiwan

- Country: Taiwan
- Network: Sanlih E-Television
- Headquarters: Taipei

Ownership
- Sister channels: SET iNews

History
- Launched: March 1998

Links
- Website: setn.com

Availability

Streaming media
- YouTube: Live streaming worldwide (mainly sister channel SET iNews and some special events); Live streaming available outside Taiwan (as 三立LIVE新聞)

SET News (SETN; Chinese: 三立新聞台; pinyin: Sānlì Xīnwén Tái) is a 24-hour news channel of the Sanlih E-Television in Taiwan, launched in March 1998.

SET News and sister channel SET iNews are considered media outlets leaning towards the Pan-Green coalition.

SET News is available on YouTube with its DOG reading Sanlih LIVE Hsinwen (Chinese: 三立LIVE新聞; pinyin: Sānlì LIVE Xīnwén). Since April 2022, this stream is available only outside Taiwan, a move also made by competitors EBC News and TVBS apparently because of dissatisfaction of the cable operators; SET replaced it with a non-geoblocked stream of sister channel SET iNews labeled as Sanlih+ (三立+).

== See also ==
- SET iNews (sister channel launched as SET Finance in 2011)
