= Era News =

Television channel of Taiwan

- Country: Republic of China (Taiwan)
- Broadcast area: Taiwan
- Network: Era Television

History
- Launched: October 1996
- Replaced: Era News (2002—present)
- Former names: GOGO TV (October 1996—1998-05-31); ERA LIFE/ERA MONEY (1998-06-01—2000-06-20) eranews (2000-06-20—2001); Era Television (2001—2002)

Links
- Website: www.eracom.com.tw

Availability

Streaming media
- I'm TV

Era News (pinyin: Niándài Xīnwén Tái) is a satellite cable news channel operated by Era Television in Taiwan, launched in October 1996 (as GOGO TV).
