= NewsX =

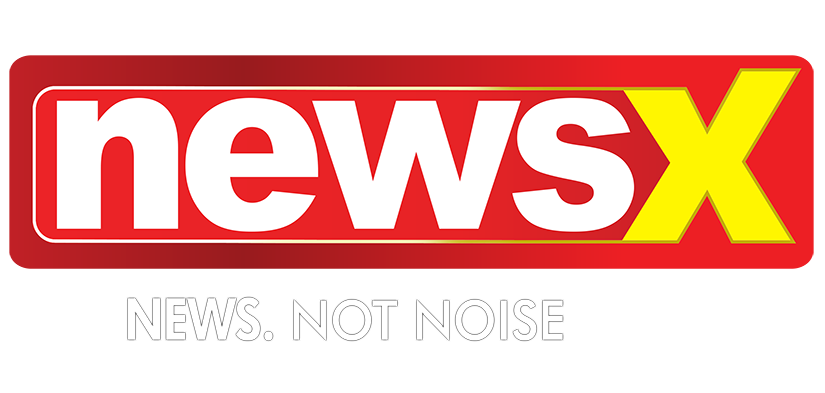
- Country: India
- Broadcast area: India
- Headquarters: Noida, India

Programming
- Language: English
- Picture format: 576i (SDTV); 1080i (HDTV)

Ownership
- Owner: itv Network
- Sister channels: India News

History
- Launched: March 27, 2008

Links
- Website: www.newsx.com

NewsX is a 24-hour English-language news television channel in India. It has been owned and operated by itv Network since 2012.

== History ==
NewsX started broadcasting on 27 March 2008. It was initially owned by INX Media, with its newsroom headed by Arup Ghosh. On 9 January 2009, NewsX was acquired by IndiMedia, of NaiDunia (Indrani Mukerjea) and journalist Jehangir Pocha. The channel faced financial difficulties under its new administration in June 2009, firing 78 of its staff. NewsX was renamed in July 2010 as IMN News (Independent Media Network), dependent on approval by IndiMedia.

In July 2012, the channel was acquired by ITV Media, owned by Karthikeya Sharma, making it a sister channel to India News and its network of state-specific news channels. The channel introduced a new logo and look in March 2014.

On 12 July 2014, editor-in-chief Jehangir Pocha died of cardiac arrest. His post was filled by Rahul Shivshankar, who had rejoined the channel in September 2013.

In August 2021, the channel started airing an investigative debate series, The Goa Chronicle Show, presented by Goa Chronicle founder Savio Rodrigues. The channel left the BARC ratings measurement in November 2022, due to apparent lack of reliability.
