= In Goa News =

- Country: India
- Broadcast area: India
- Headquarters: Panjim, Goa, India

Programming
- Languages: Marathi, Konkani, English
- Picture format: 576i (SDTV)

Ownership
- Owner: Anil Lad

Links
- Website: ingoanews.com

In Goa News is a Panaji based 24-hour Marathi news and entertainment television channel owned by Anil Lad. It is watched by approximately 200,000 viewers on Goa's cable network and through internet worldwide. It is the first channel from Goa to broadcast live television on the internet. It is also available on Jio TV.

== Programmes ==
- Ruchik
- Healthy Living
- Test Drive
- Women in Goa
- Smart Gruhini
- Aaji Baicha Batwa

== Crew ==
- Anil Lad
- Yati Lad
- Akshay Lad
- Shobha Lad
- Rakesh Agarwadekar
- Sharmila Mandrekar
- Prathamesh Murgod
- Leena Bandekar
- Sagar Mulvi
- Swati Volvoikar
- Digambar Bhagat

== See also ==
- Media in Goa
