= News7 Tamil =

Indian news channel in Chennai, Tamil Nadu

- Country: India
- Broadcast area: India
- Network: News7
- Headquarters: Tamil Nadu, India

Programming
- Language: Tamil
- Picture format: 1080i, (HDTV) (HD feed downgraded to letterboxed 576i for SDTVs); 4K (UHDTV) (part-time, selected broadcasts)

Ownership
- Owner: Sakal Media Group
- Sister channels: Saam TV; Kolkata TV; News 10 Kannada

History
- Launched: 19 October 2014; 10 years ago

Links
- Website: www.news7tamil.live

News7 Tamil is a Tamil news channel headquartered at Chennai, Tamil Nadu, India. It is previously owned by the Tamil Nadu-based VV Group. News7 Tamil Television launched on 19 October 2014. It broadcasts news, discussion, documentary and infotainment programmes. The channel was owned by Sakal Media Group

== History ==
The channel was launched on October 19, 2014.
