= News Time Bangla =

Indian Bengali news channel

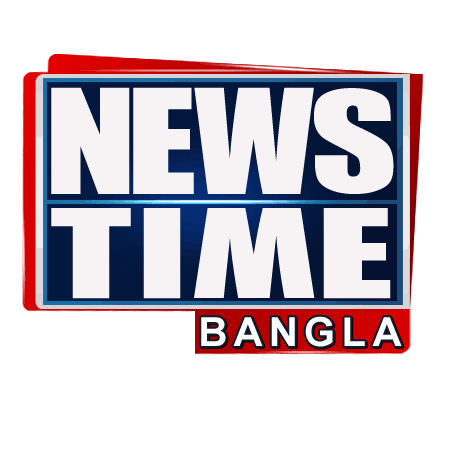
- Logo used since 2017
- Country: India
- Broadcast area: India; Bangladesh
- Headquarters: Kolkata, West Bengal, India

Programming
- Language: Bengali
- Picture format: 576i SDTV

Ownership
- Owner: PTC Network

History
- Launched: 1 January 2010; 16 years ago

News Time Bangla is a 24-hour Bengali news channel launched in 2010. In 2011 they broadcast the 33rd Federation cup held in Kolkata. It is a sister channel of Punjabi channel PTC News

== See also ==
- International broadcasting
- List of Indian television stations
- 24-hour television news channels
