= Era Television =

Taiwanese television network

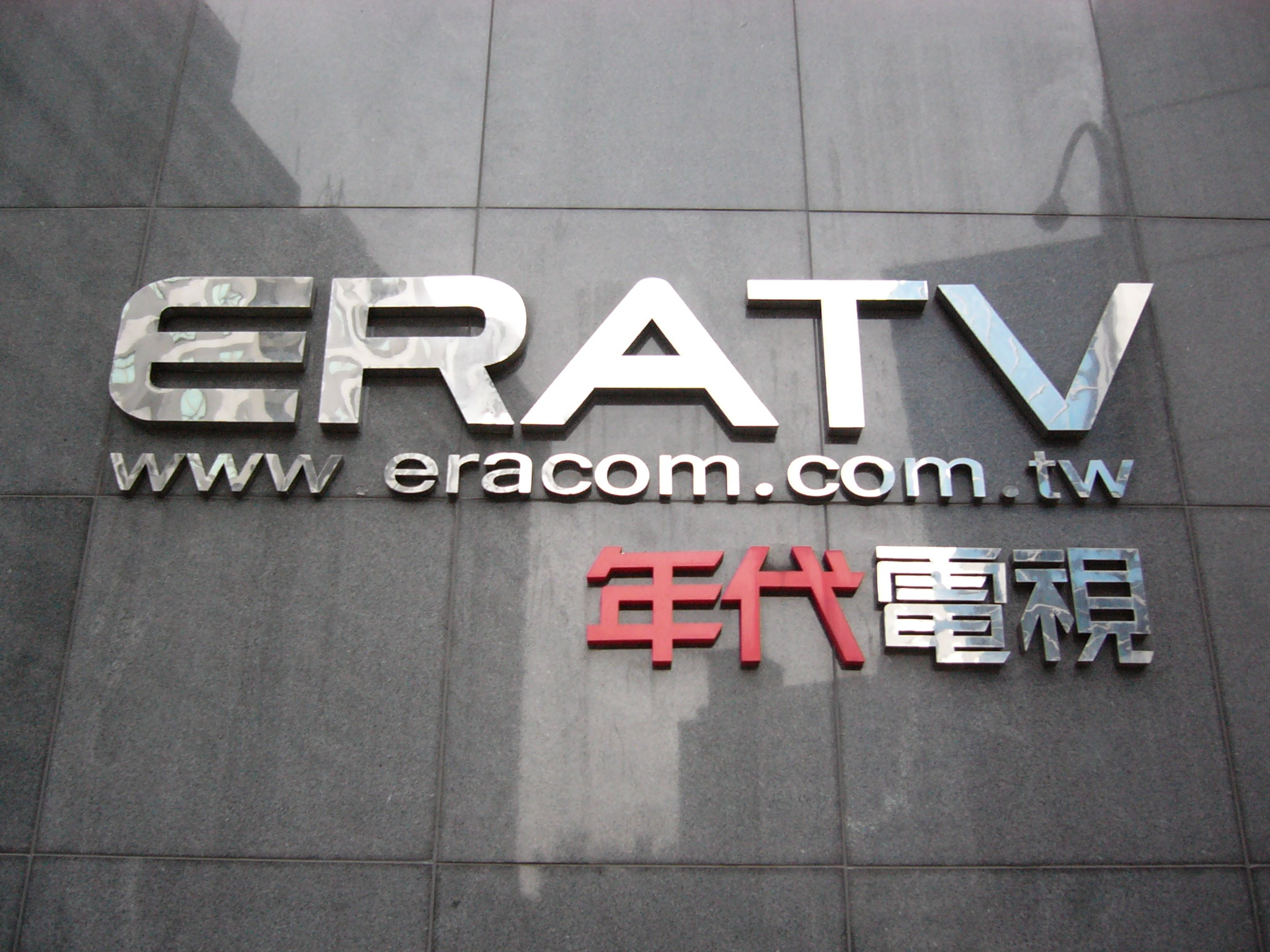
- Type: Nationwide cable TV network
- Branding: ERA
- Country: Republic of China (Taiwan)
- Availability: Taiwan
- Founded: October 1996 by Chiu Fu-sheng
- Official website: http://www.eracom.com.tw/

Era Television (Chinese: 年代電視) is a nationwide cable TV network in Taiwan that is operated by ERA Communications Inc., established in October 1996.

Era Television 1st logo

== Era TV Channels ==
Era TV currently operates three commercial cable television channels:

- Era News (Chinese: 年代新聞台)
- Much TV (Chinese: 年代MUCH台)
- Azio TV (Chinese: 年代東風)

== See also ==
- List of Taiwanese television series
