= Tattiannaram =

Tatti annaram
- Village
- Country: India
- State: Telangana

Languages
  - Official: Telugu
- Time zone: UTC+5:30 (IST)
- PIN: 500068
- Telephone code: 040
- Vehicle registration: TS-08 X XXXX
- Website: telangana.gov.in

Tattiannaram is a village in Hayathnagar Rangareddy district in Telangana, India. It falls under Abdullapurmet mandal.
