= Kammaguda =

Coordinates: 17°11′N 78°17′E

Kammaguda is a village in Rangareddy district in Andhra Pradesh, India. It falls under Hayathnagar mandal.
