= Batasingaram =

- Village
- Location in Telangana, India Batasingaram (Telangana) Batasingaram (India)
- Coordinates: 17°18′N 78°44′E
- Country: India
- State: Telangana

Languages
  - Official: Telugu
- Time zone: UTC+5:30 (IST)
- Telephone code: 040
- Vehicle registration: TS 08

Batasingaram is a village that falls under Abdullapur mandal in Ranga Reddy district in Telangana, India. I. It is near the Outer Ring Road, Hyderabad.

== Batasingaram Logistic Park ==
The Batasingaram Logistic Park, an inter-city truck terminal, would be coming up on a 40-acre site few km from Outer Ring Road (ORR) towards Vijayawada at an estimated cost of Rs.35crore.
