= Gandicheruvu =

- Village
- Country: India
- State: Telangana

Languages
  - Official: Telugu
- Time zone: UTC+5:30 (IST)
- Telephone code: 040
- Vehicle registration: TS-26 X XXXX
- Website: telangana.gov.in

Gandicheruvu or Gandi Cheruvu is a village in Rangareddy district in Telangana, India. It falls under Hayathnagar mandal.
