= Munganoor, Ranga Reddy district =

Munganoor
- Village
- Location in Telangana, India
- Coordinates: 17°18′4.09″N 78°36′32.36″E
- Country: India
- State: Telangana
- Established: 1995

Government
  - Body: gramapanchayat

Area
  - Total: 3.5 km^{2} (1.4 sq mi)

Population (2012)
  - Total: 2,568
  - Density: 730/km^{2} (1,900/sq mi)

Languages
  - Official: Telugu
- Time zone: UTC+5:30 (IST)
- PIN: 501511
- Telephone code: 040
- Vehicle registration: TS 08 xx XXXX

Munaganoor is a village in Ranga Reddy district in Telangana, India. It falls under Abdullapurmet mandal. It covers an area of 3,200 acres (1,300 ha). Munaganoor village is rapidly expanding towards Hayathanagar in the north and Torrur in the south through the main road with the establishment of banks, state level schools and colleges.

== Sports ==
In this area cricket is the most preferred game. The inhabitants conduct cricket tournaments every year as M P L for the past three years. This tournaments are organized well as to encourage local players to get into mandal level. Now recently they conducted a tournament called MPL-3.
