= Chinnaraviryala =

- Village
- Country: India
- State: Telangana

Population (2011)
  - Total: 3,416

Languages
  - Official: Telugu
- Time zone: UTC+5:30 (IST)
- Telephone code: 040
- Vehicle registration: TS 09 X XXXX

Chinnaraviryala is a village in Ranga Reddy district in Telangana, India. It falls under Abdullapurmet mandal.
