= Pedda Bandaraviryala =

- Village
- Country: India
- State: Andhra Pradesh

Languages
  - Official: Telugu
- Time zone: UTC+5:30 (IST)
- PIN: 501505
- Telephone code: 040
- Vehicle registration: AP 29 X XXXX

Pedda Bandaraviryala is a village in Ranga Reddy district in Andhra Pradesh, India. It falls under Hayathnagar mandal.
