= Ramoji Film City =

Film studio complex in India

Coordinates: 17.252°N 78.681°E

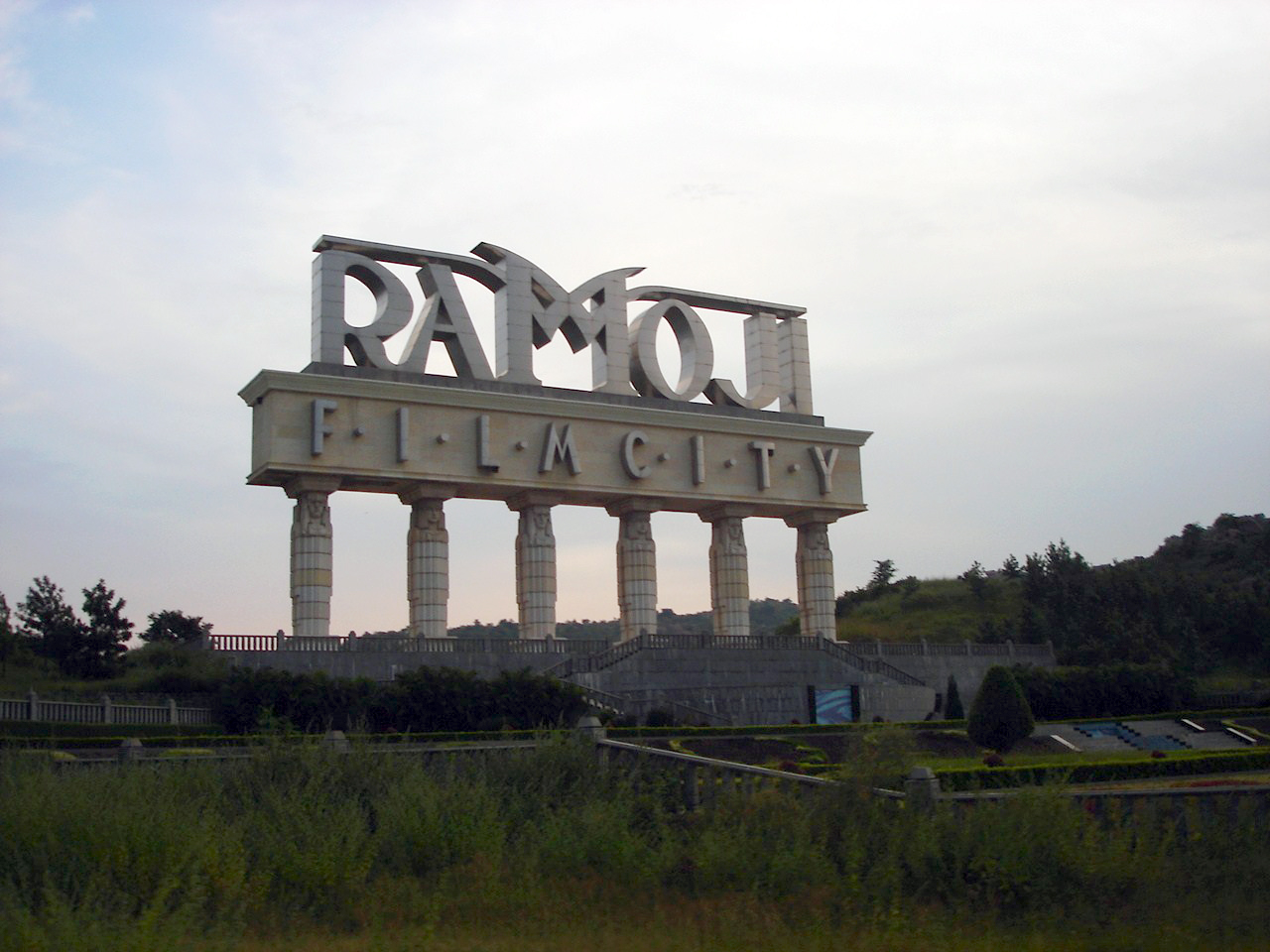
- Entrance to Ramoji Film City
- Type: Privately held company
- Industry: Motion pictures
- Founded: 1996; 30 years ago
- Founder: Cherukuri Ramoji Rao
- Headquarters: Abdullahpurmet, Hyderabad, India
- Parent: Ramoji Group
- Website: ramojifilmcity.com

Ramoji Film City is an integrated film studio facility located right outside of Hyderabad, India. Spread over 2,000 acres (810 ha), it was recognized as the world's largest film studio complex by the Guinness World Records in 2005. Established in 1996 by Telugu media proprietor Ramoji Rao, it has been described as a "city within a city" by The Guardian.

In addition to serving as a major hub for film production, Ramoji Film City is a popular thematic holiday destination, featuring a mix of natural landscapes, artificial sets, and an amusement park. Around 15 lakh (1.5 million) tourists visit the place every year.

== History ==
Ramoji Film City, located in Abdullapurmet on the outskirts of Hyderabad, was conceived by Ramoji Rao, a businessman, media proprietor, and film producer. Drawing inspiration from the grandeur of Hollywood studios, it was envisioned as a state-of-the-art facility for film production and a thematic destination for visitors.

Following the acquisition of land, Ramoji Rao commissioned art director Nitish Roy to design the complex. The site, which originally featured jungles and rugged terrain, was developed with a focus on preserving its natural environment and ecological features.

The first film to be entirely shot at Ramoji Film City was Maa Nannaku Pelli (1997). According to urban legend, the city was built on the battlefield of the Nizams and is haunted by the spirits of soldiers who died there many years prior.

== Studio facilities ==
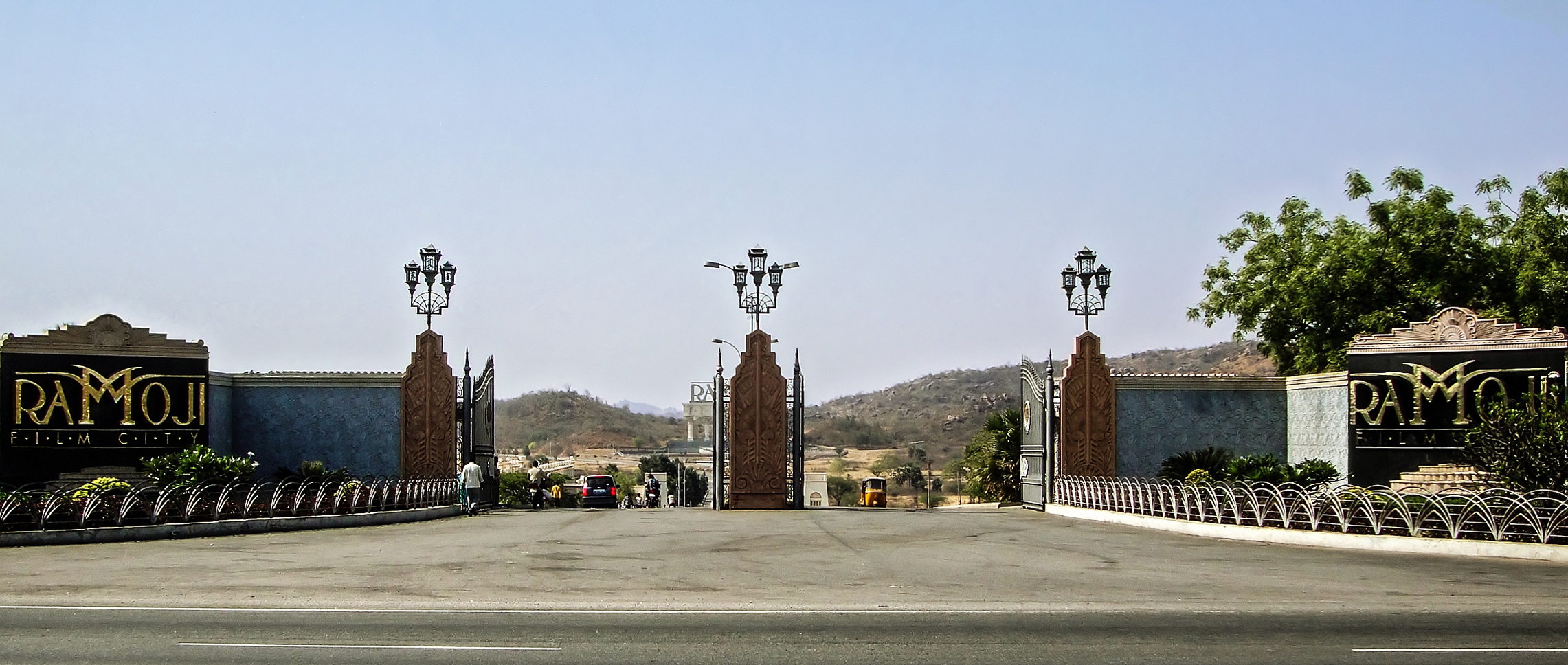
Ramoji Film City entrance

The film city encompasses a wide range of sets and production facilities designed to cater to various filmmaking requirements. The site includes permanent sets such as forests, gardens, mansions, apartment blocks, hotels, a railway station, and an airport, as well as 47 sound stages for indoor filming. Additional infrastructure include a central kitchen to support film crews. The film city features various entertainment facilities like Filmi Duniya, Wings (birds park), space tour, the wild west, Mahishmati sets for Bahubali franchise, Chandramukhi sets, Fundusthan, butterfly garden, Kripalu caves, Chinese garden, Bhagavatham set, The godless temple, fake prison, Eureka fun place, Rajasthan palace sets, Mughal garden, Vrindavan garden, England sets, and the sets of airport, railway station etc. It creates a memorable moment to tourists.

The facility is equipped with six hotels and provides internal transportation via vintage buses and air-conditioned coaches. Employing approximately 1,200 staff members and 8,000 agents, Ramoji Film City handles around 400–500 film productions annually across multiple Indian languages. It can accommodate up to 15 simultaneous shoots.

== Tourism ==
Beyond its role in film production, Ramoji Film City is a major tourist destination, featuring both natural and artificial attractions. Key elements include an amusement park, gardens, and film sets from notable productions such as Baahubali (2015) and Baahubali 2 (2017). Attracting nearly 15 lakh (1.5 million) visitors annually, the facility offers a range of experiences, including tours of film sets and thematic zones. The site is designed to provide a blend of entertainment and insight into the filmmaking process.

== Gallery ==
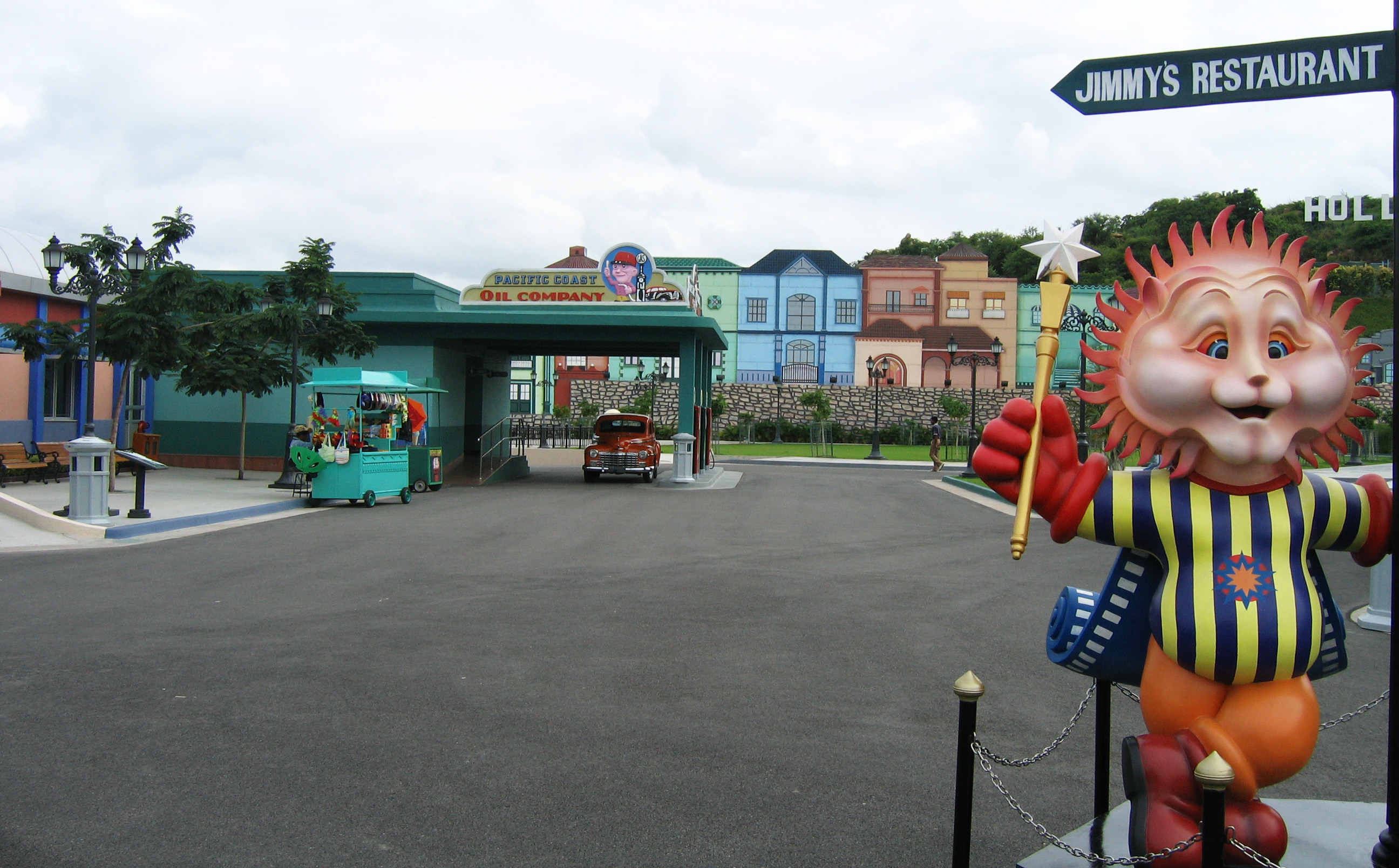
A view from Ramoji Film City

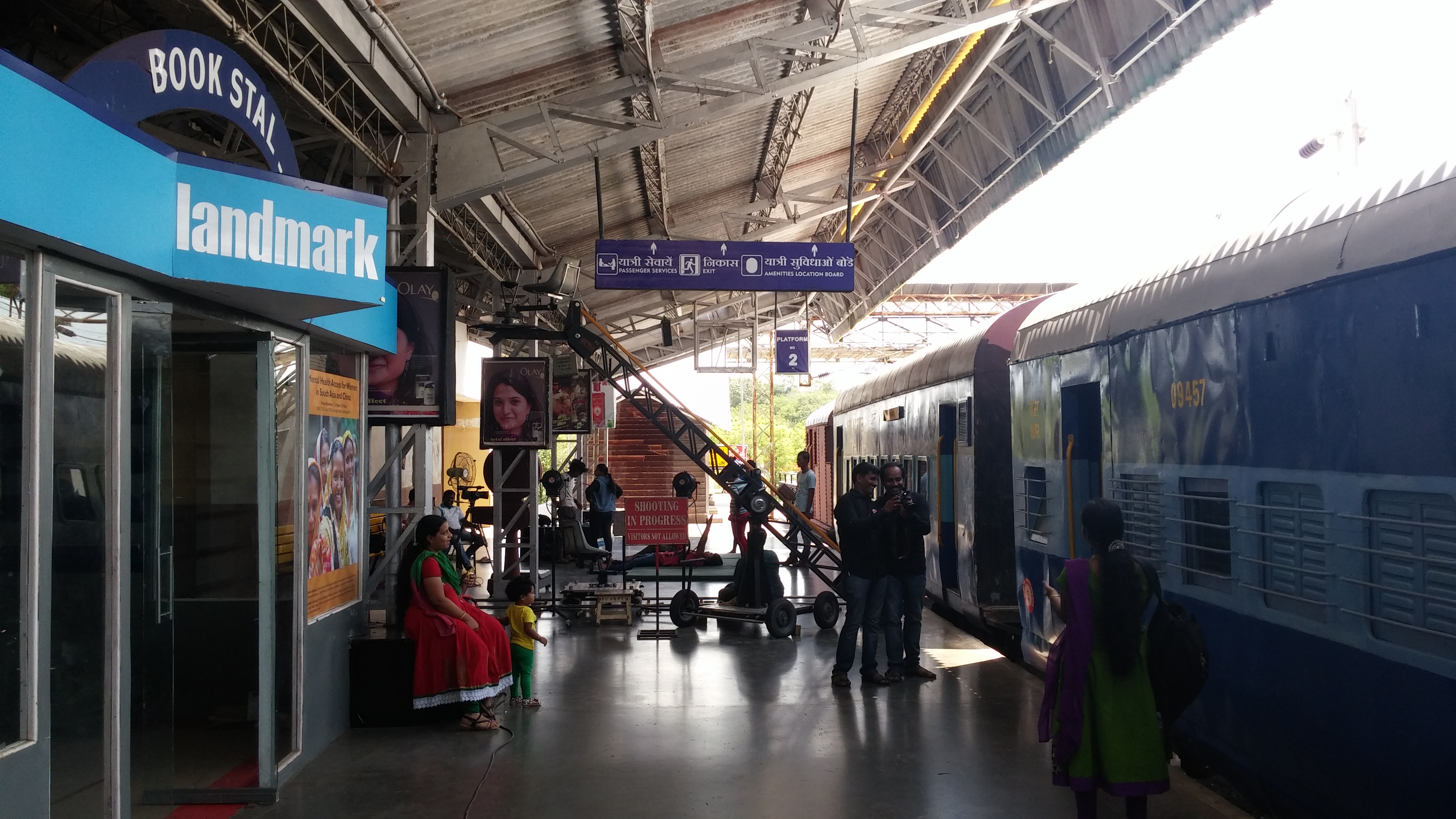
A railway station set used in the film Chennai Express

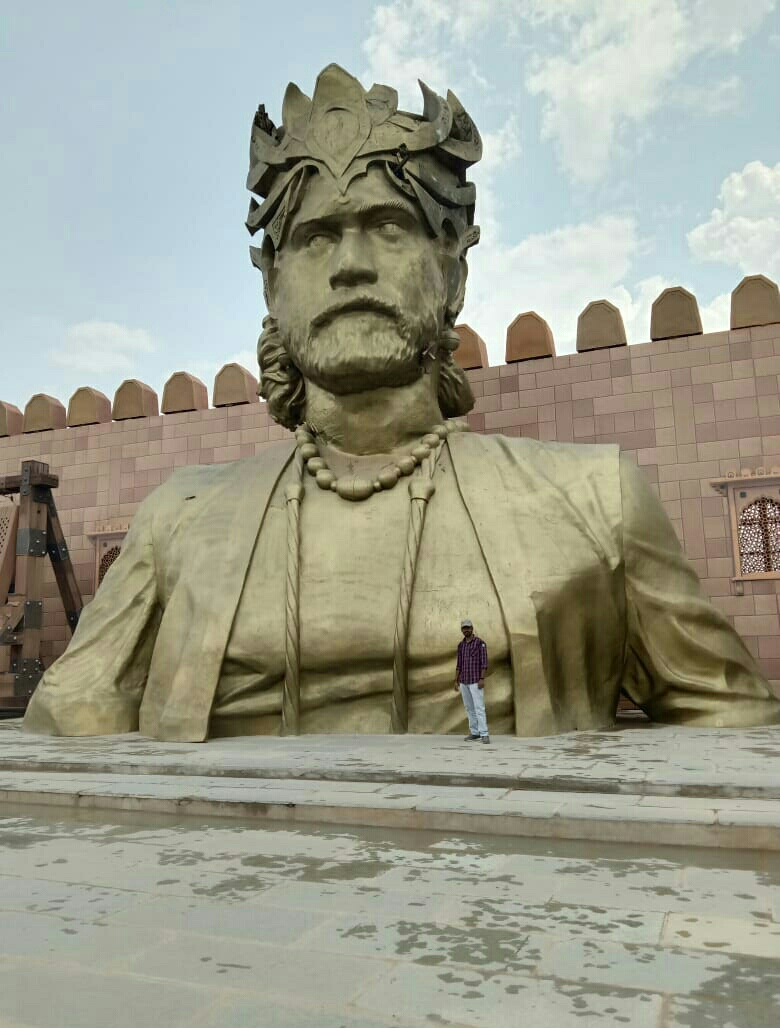
Statue of Bhallaladeva from Baahubali franchise

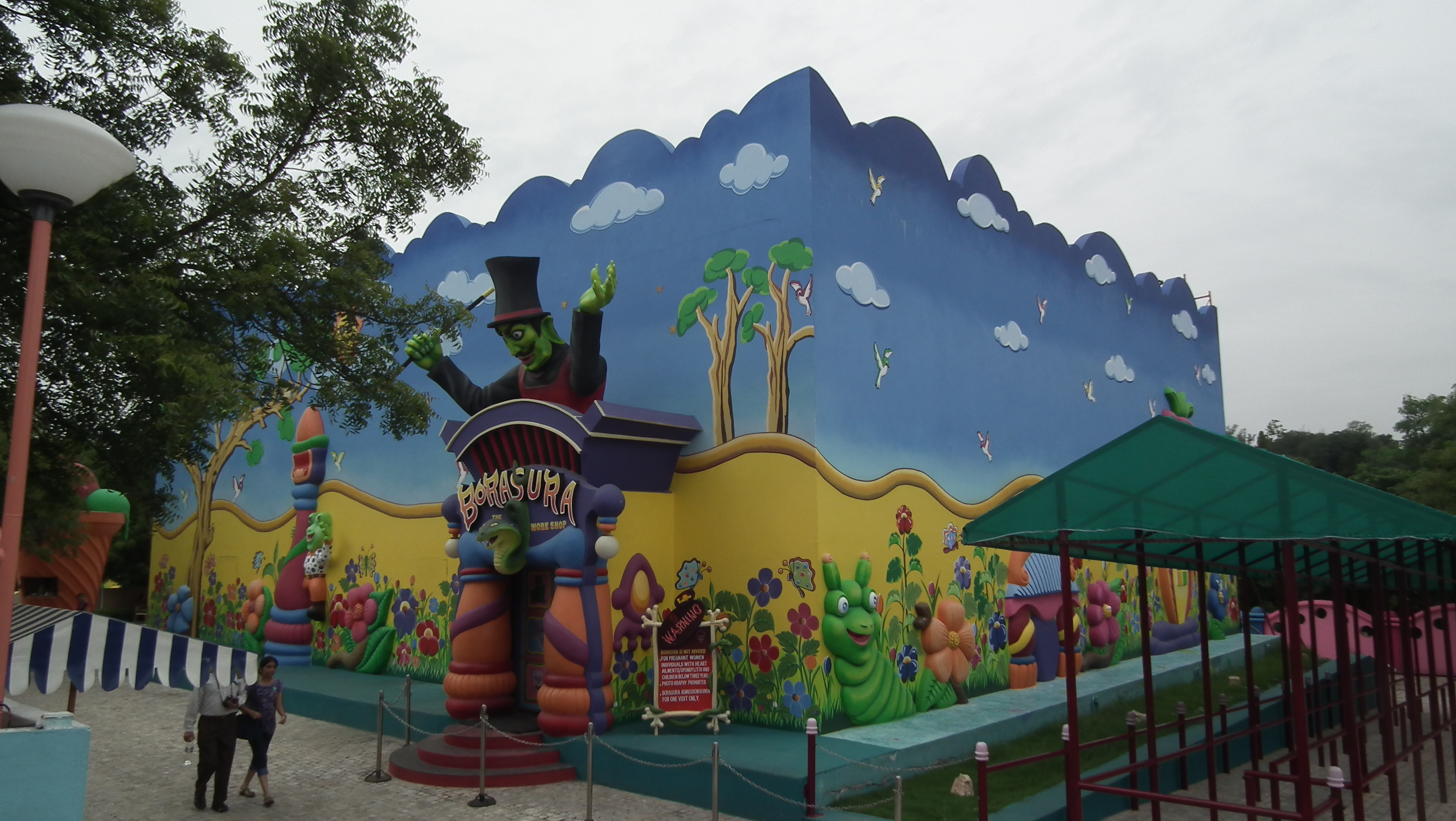
Burasura at Fundustan fun area

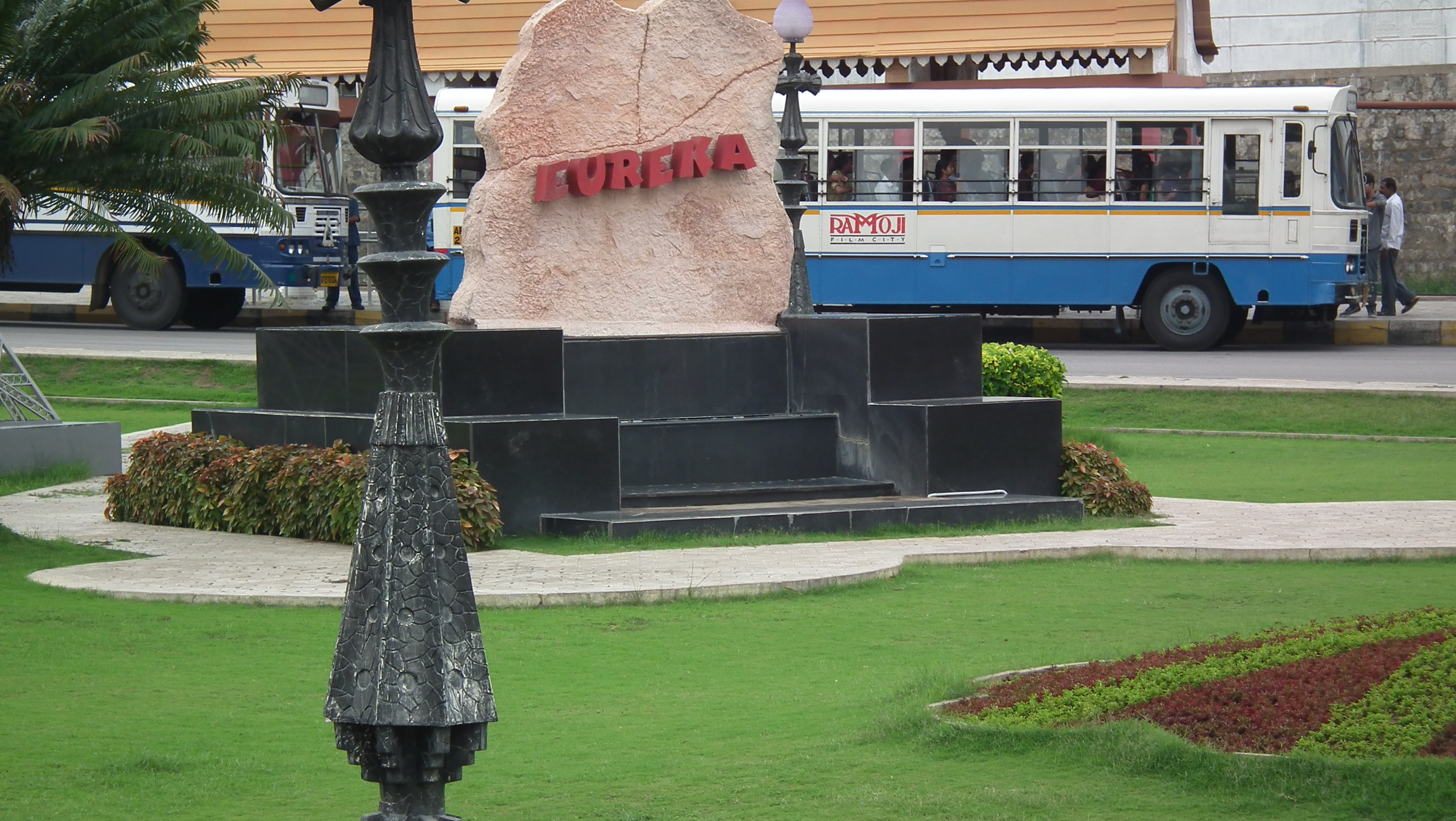
Eureka fun place

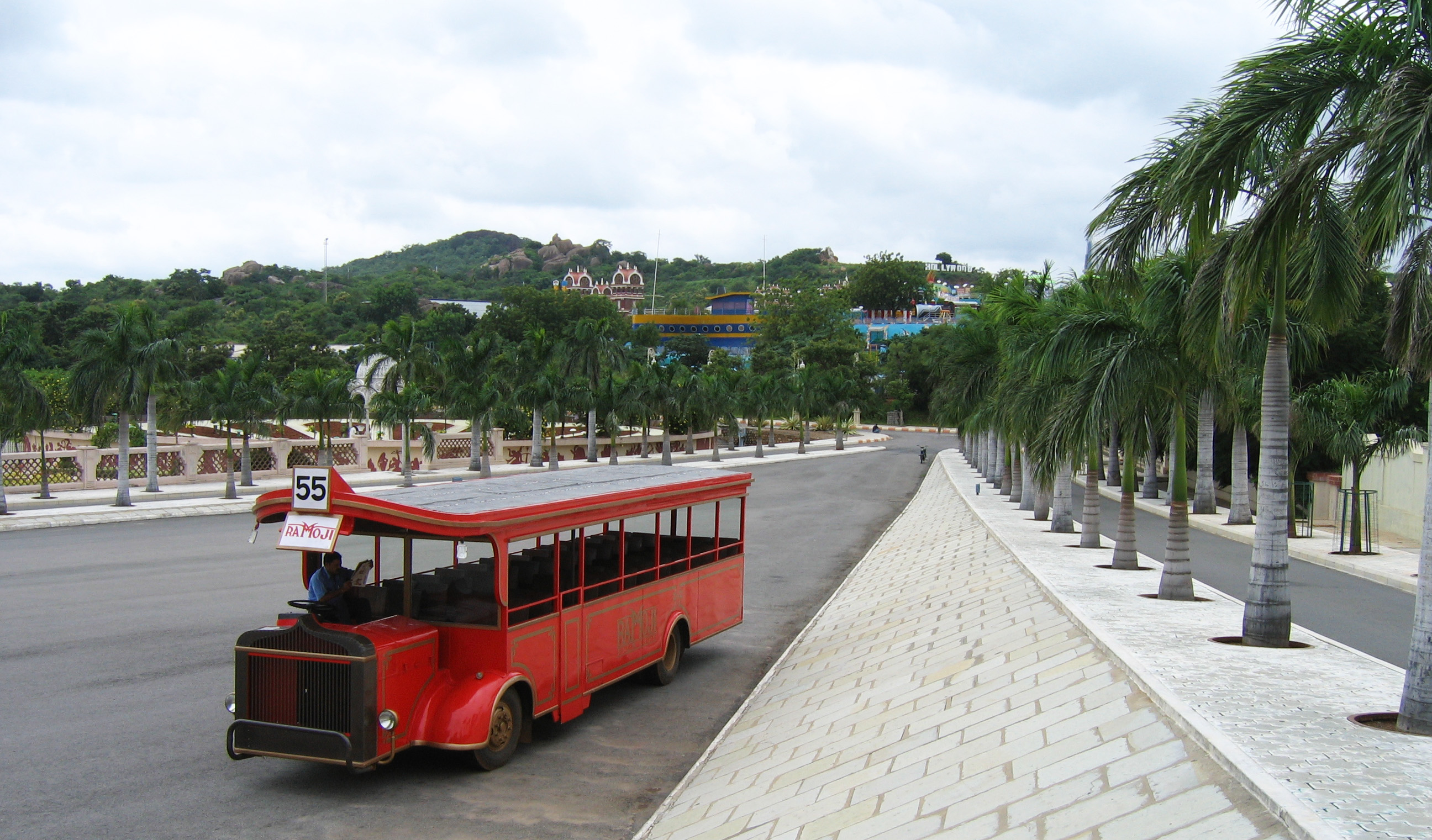
Views from Ramoji Film City

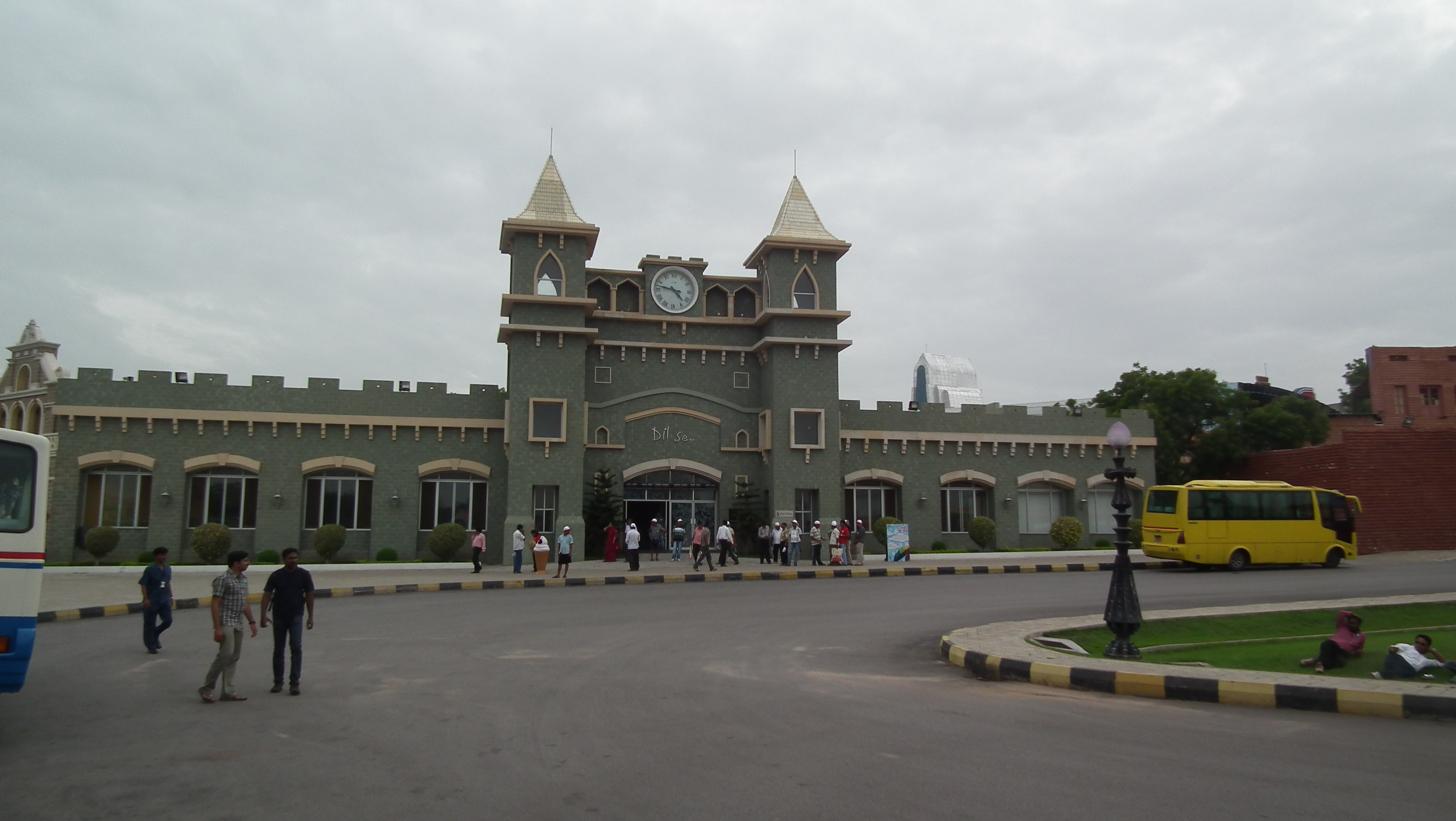
Dil Se restaurant

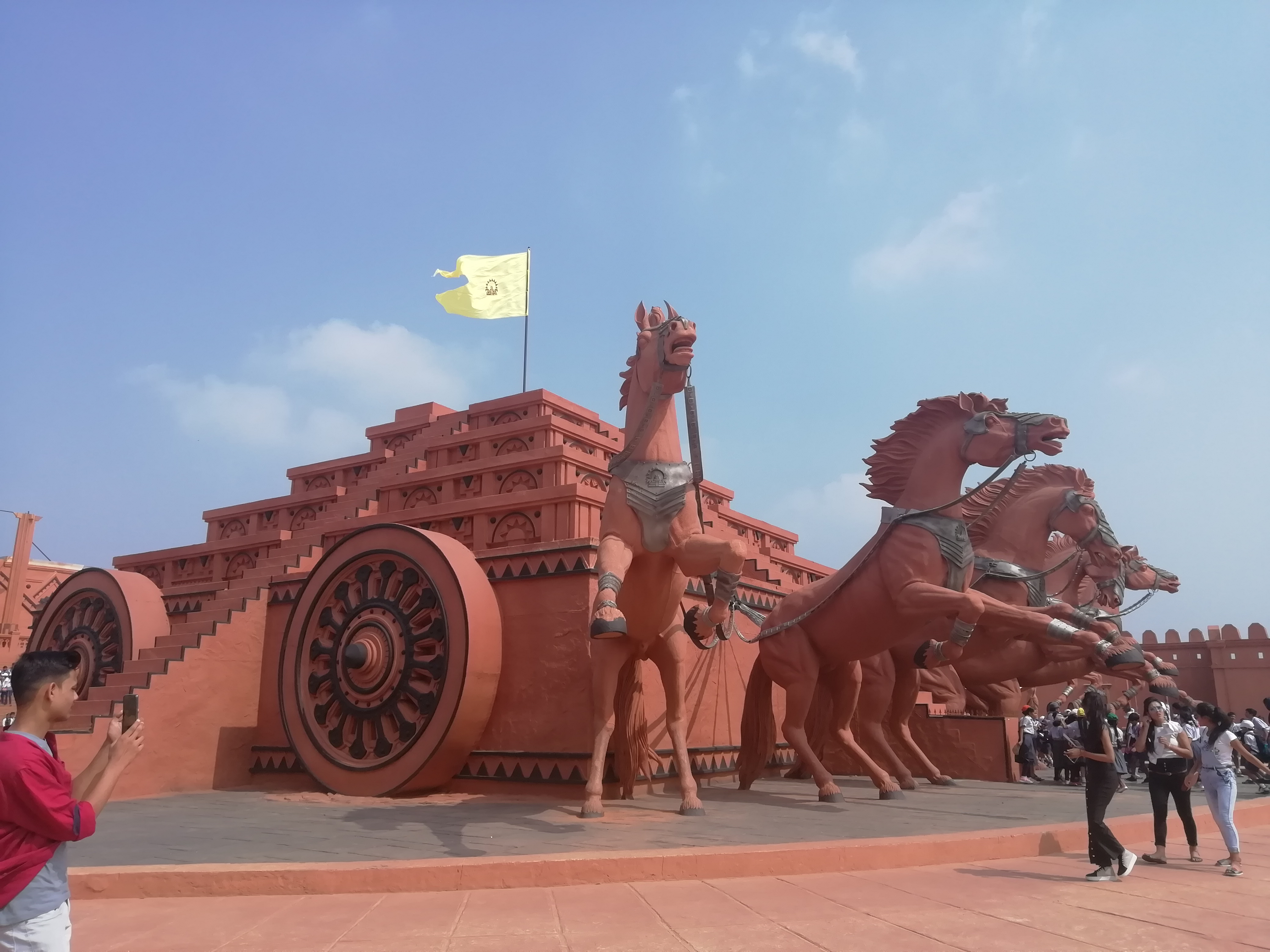
Baahubali film set

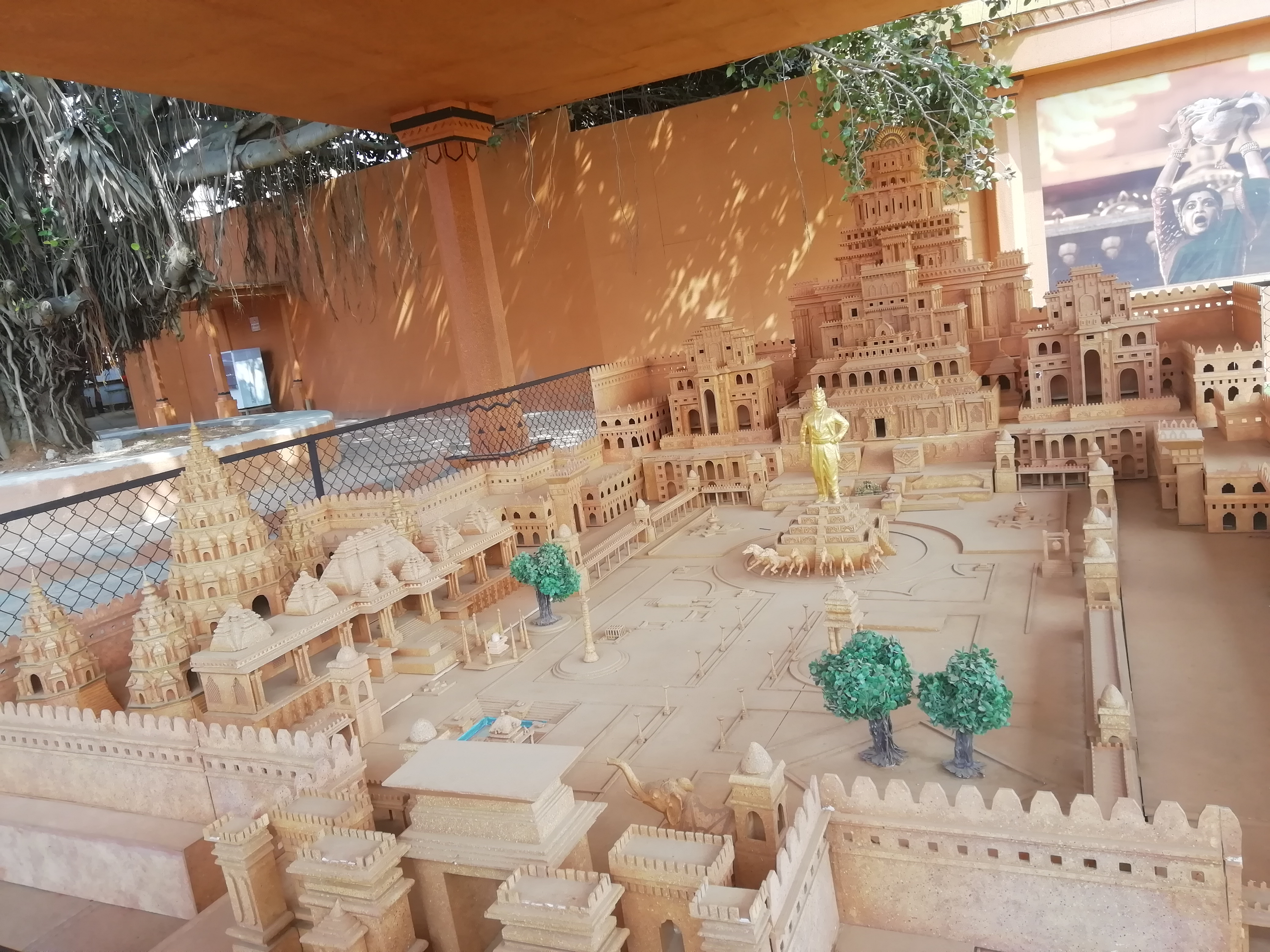
Film sets

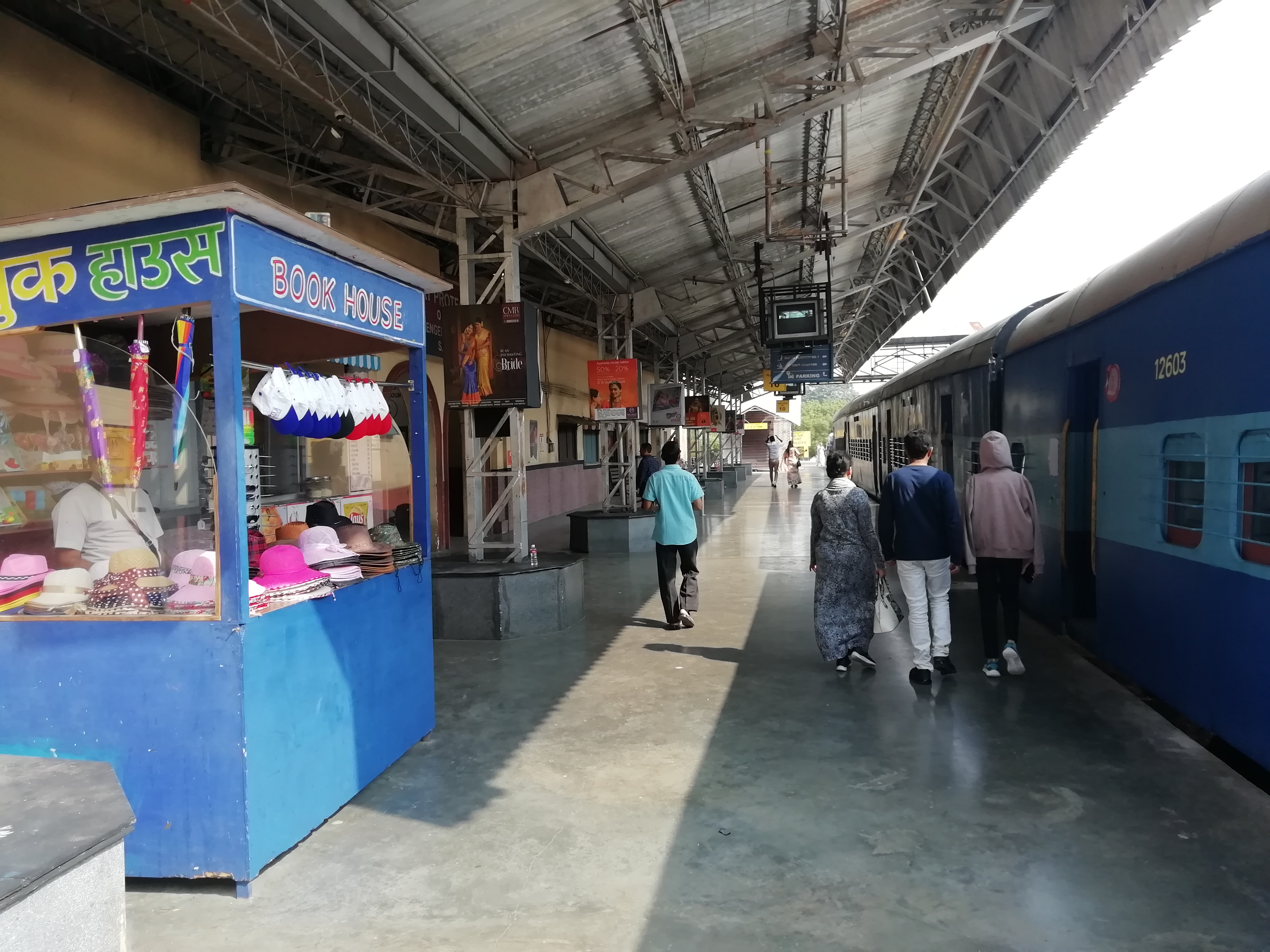
Railway station platform set

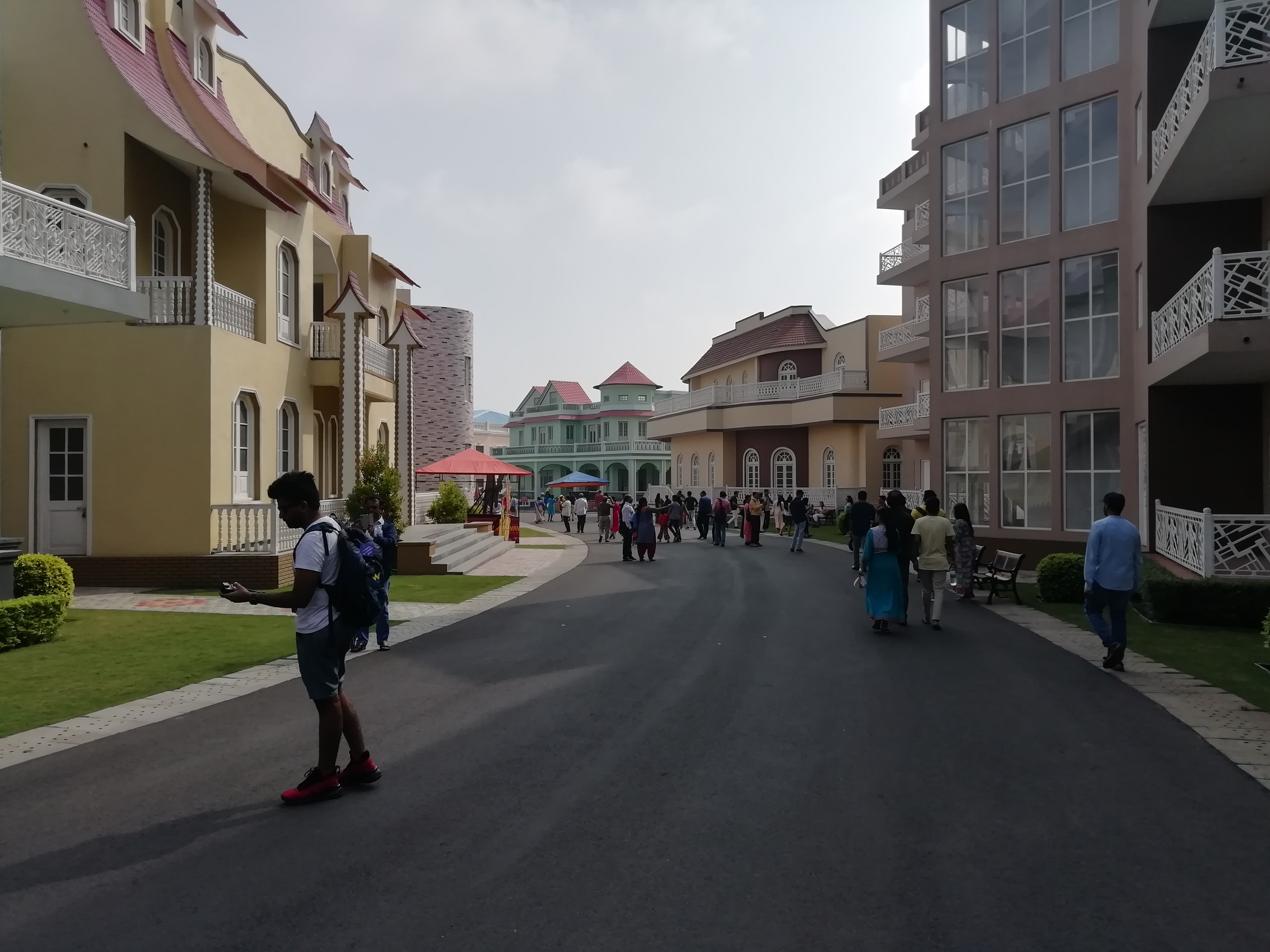
Film sets

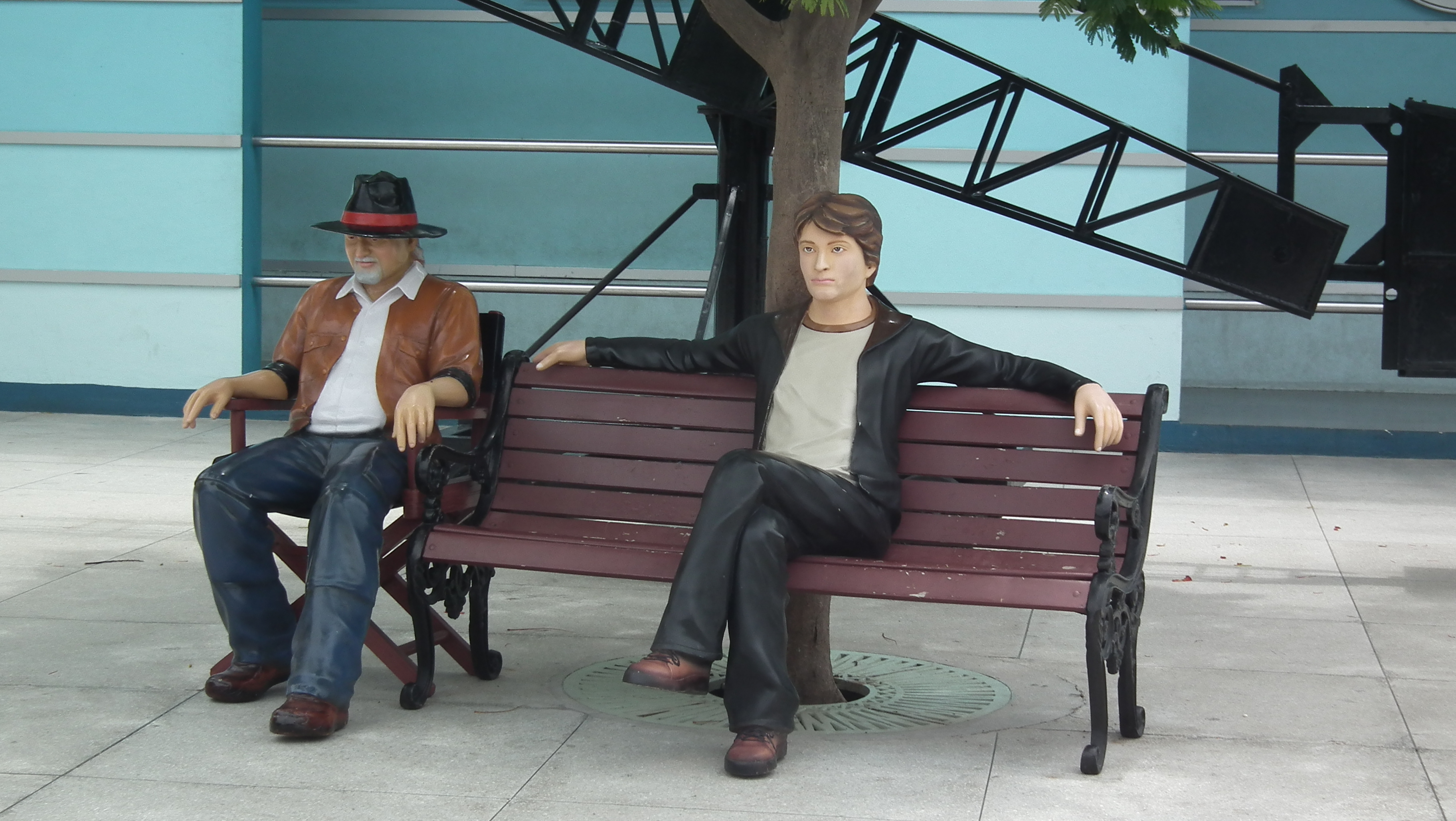
A view from Main Fun area

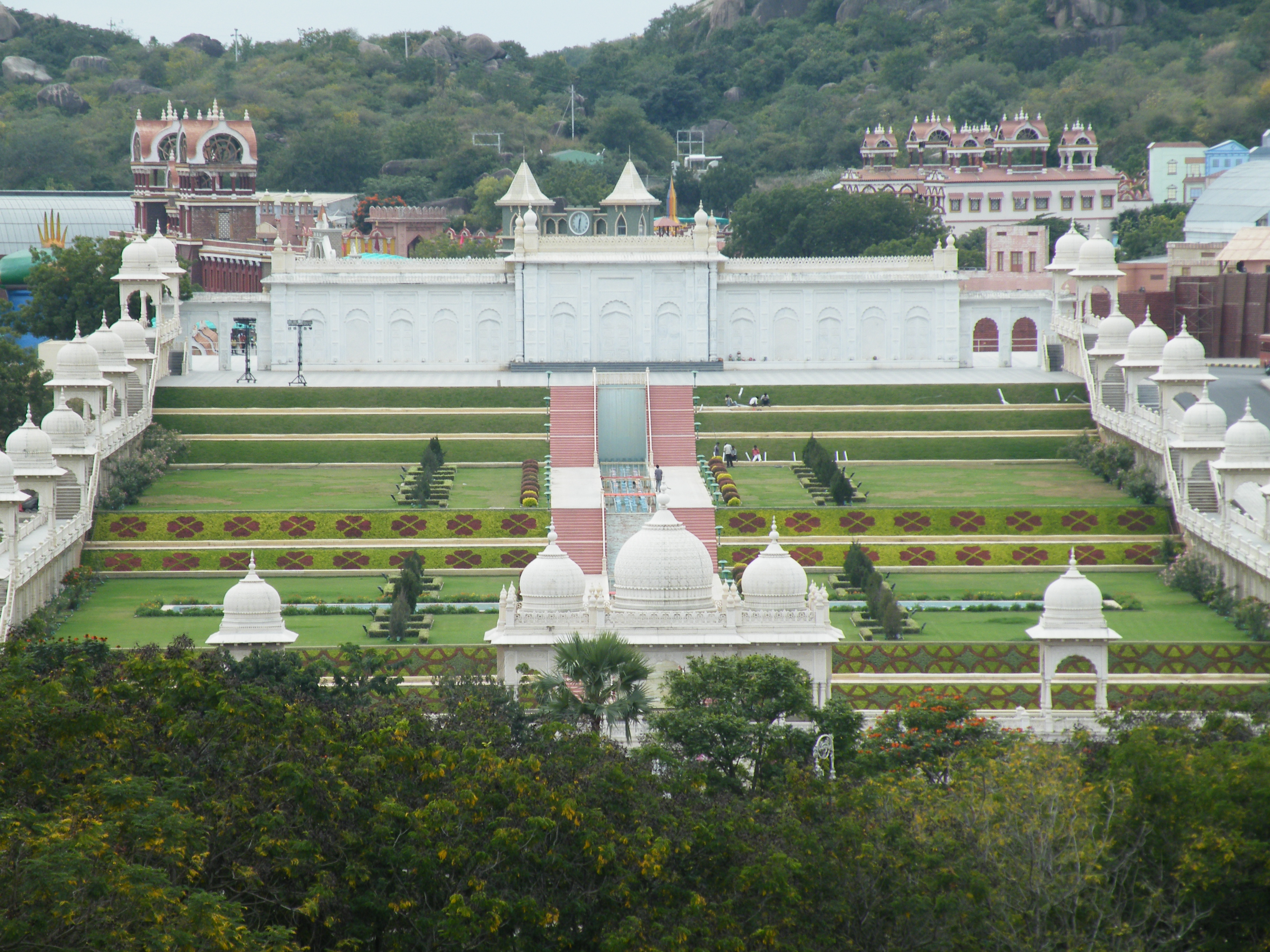
Mock of a Rajasthan palace

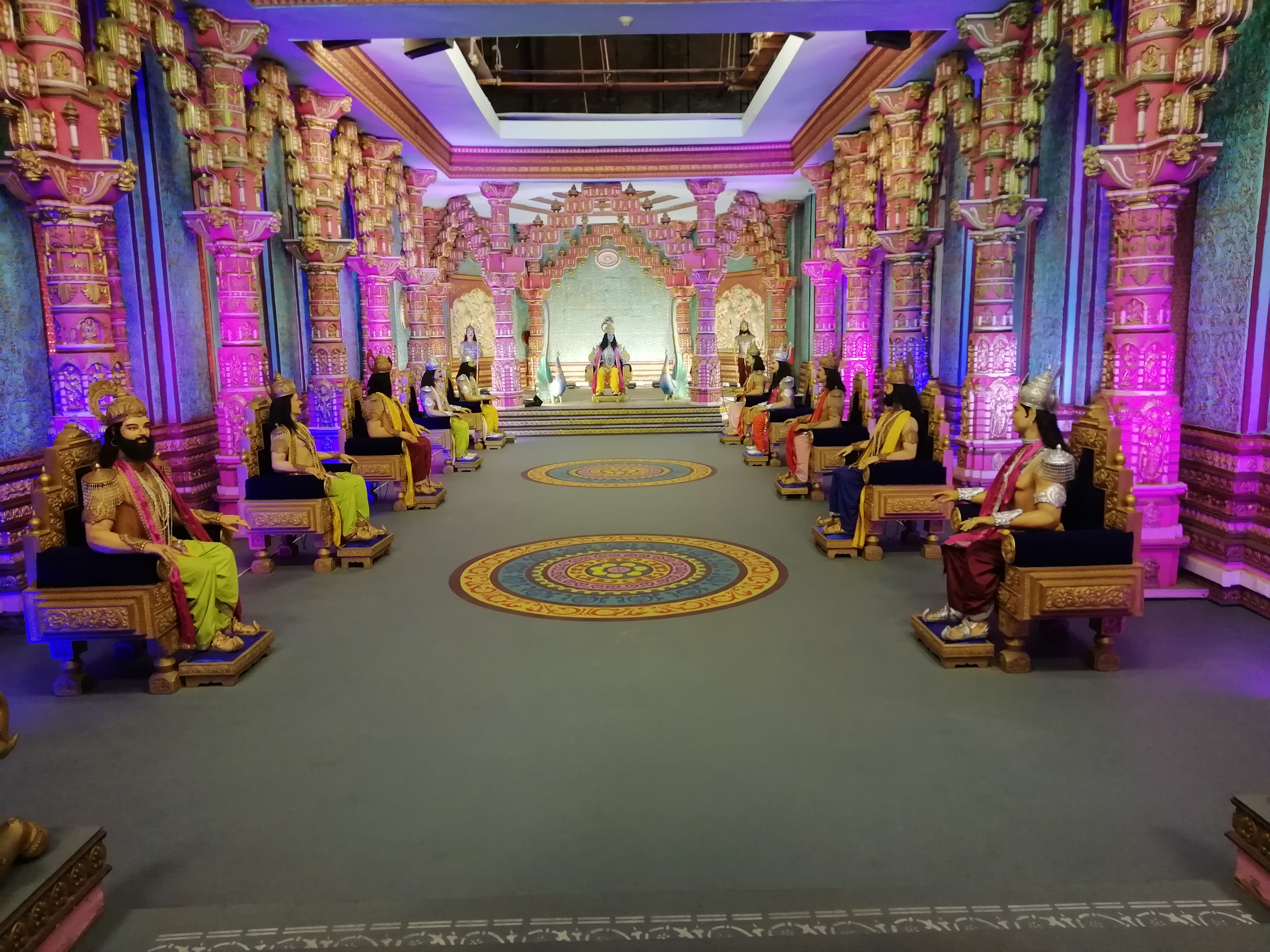
Historical Bhagavatam set

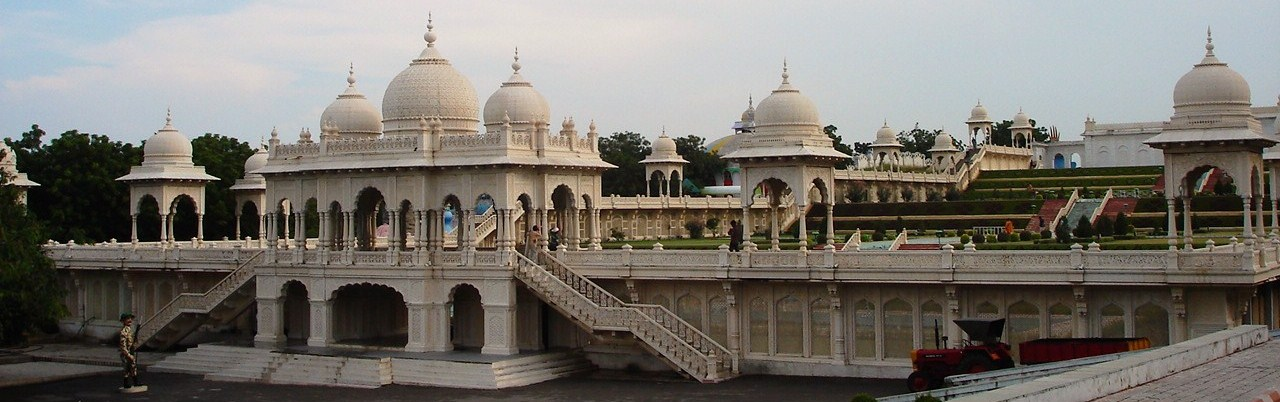
Vrindavan gardens setting

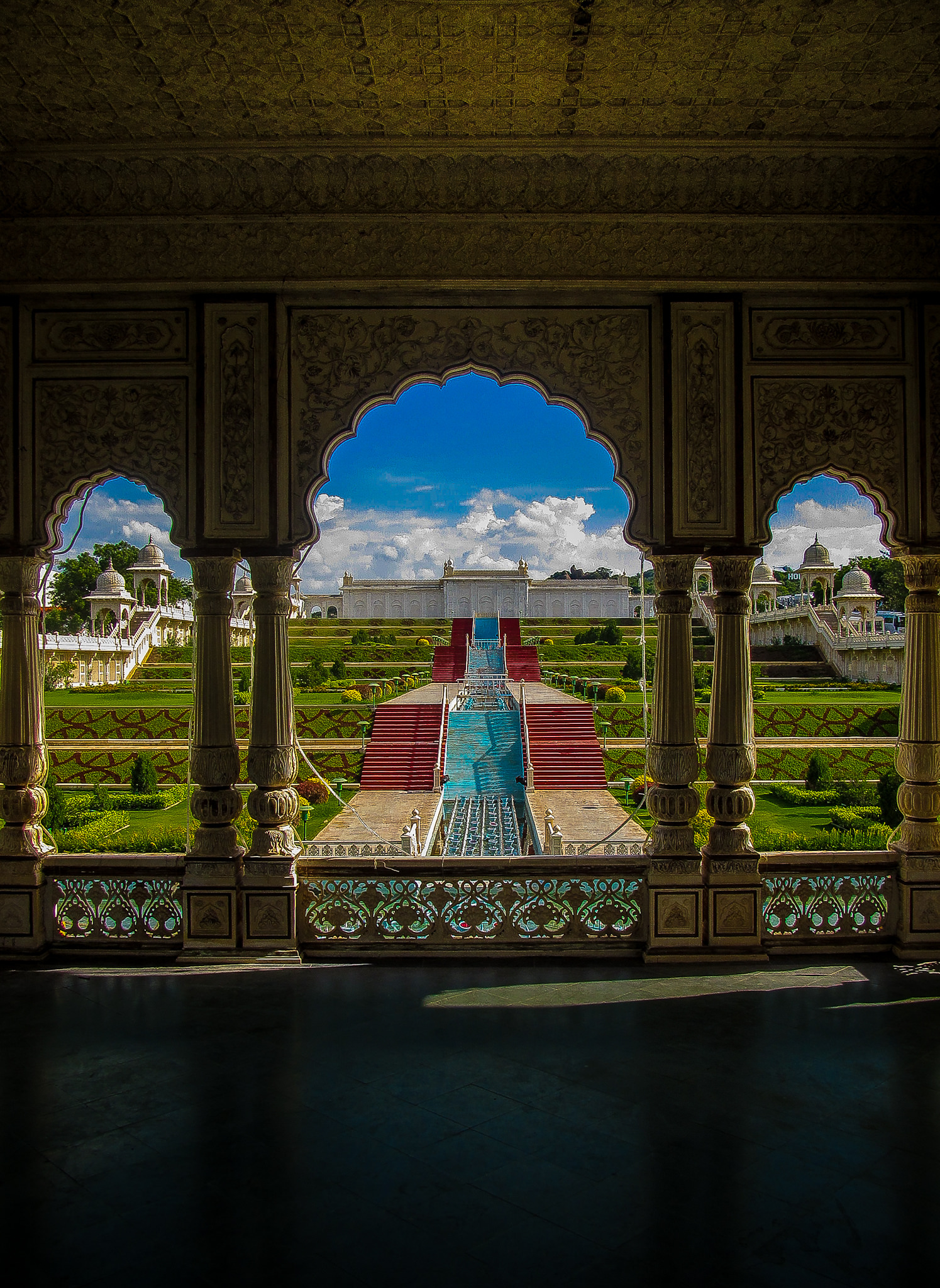
Mughal Garden

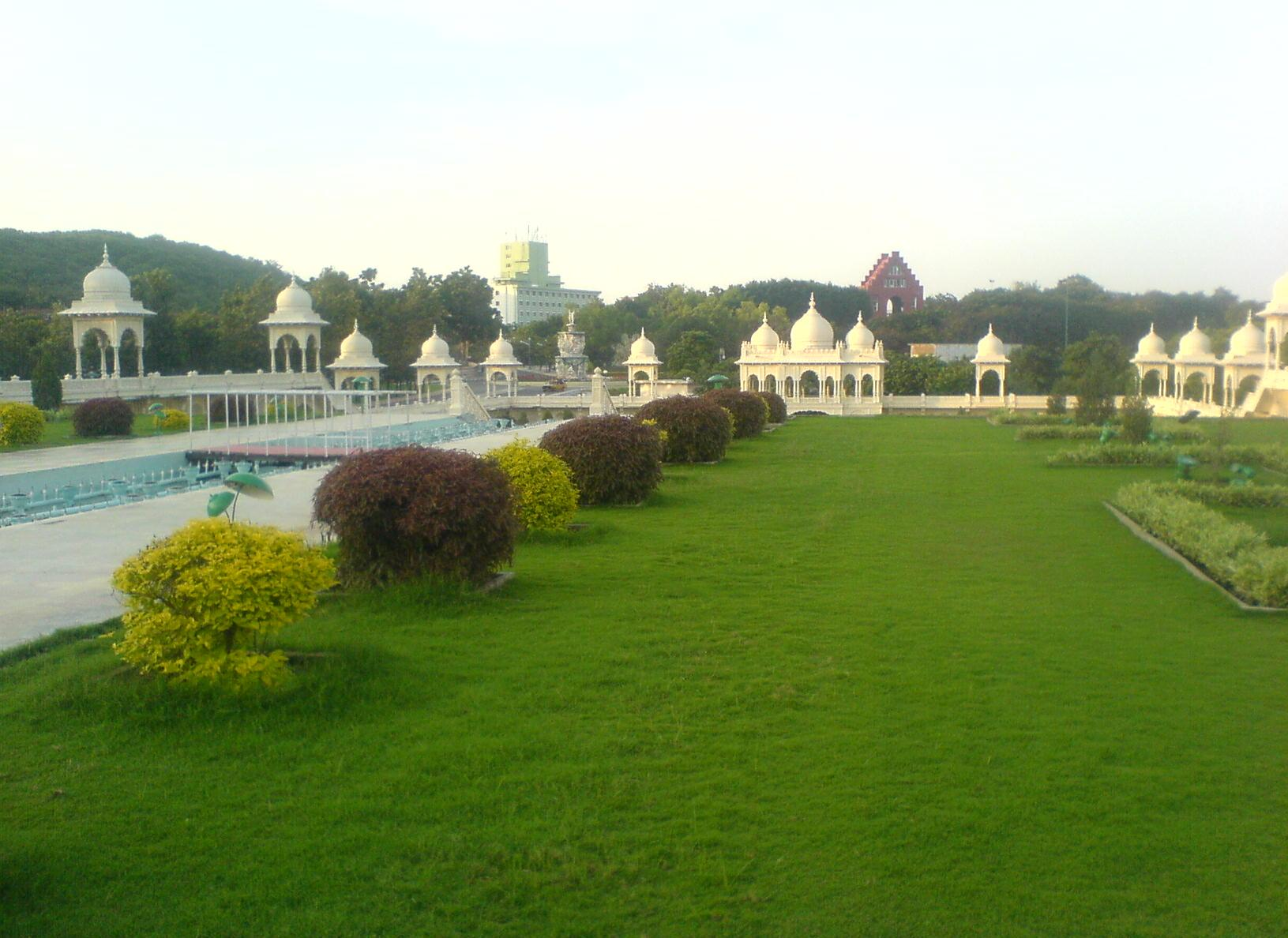
Mughal Garden

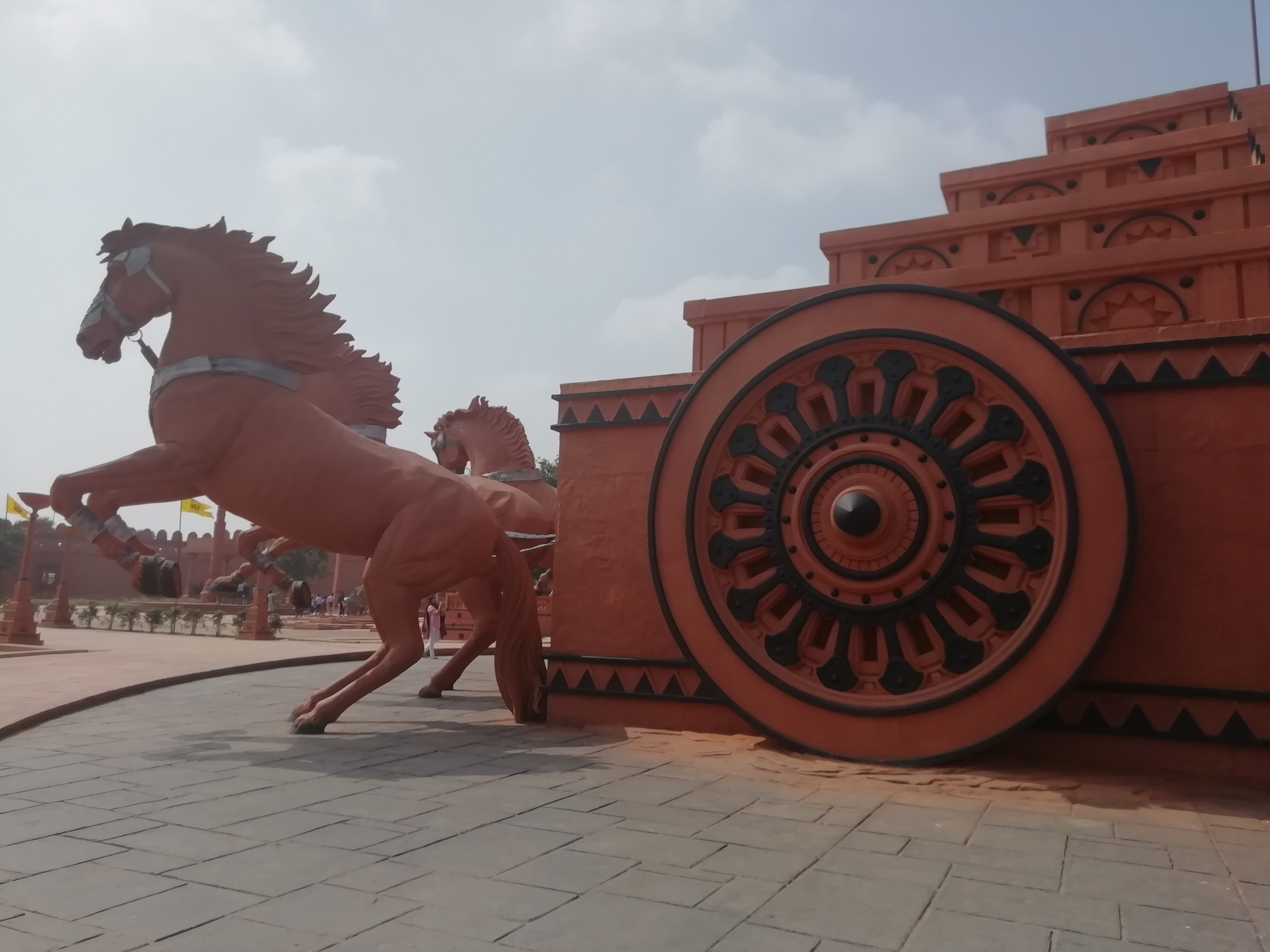
Bahubali film set in Ramoji Film City

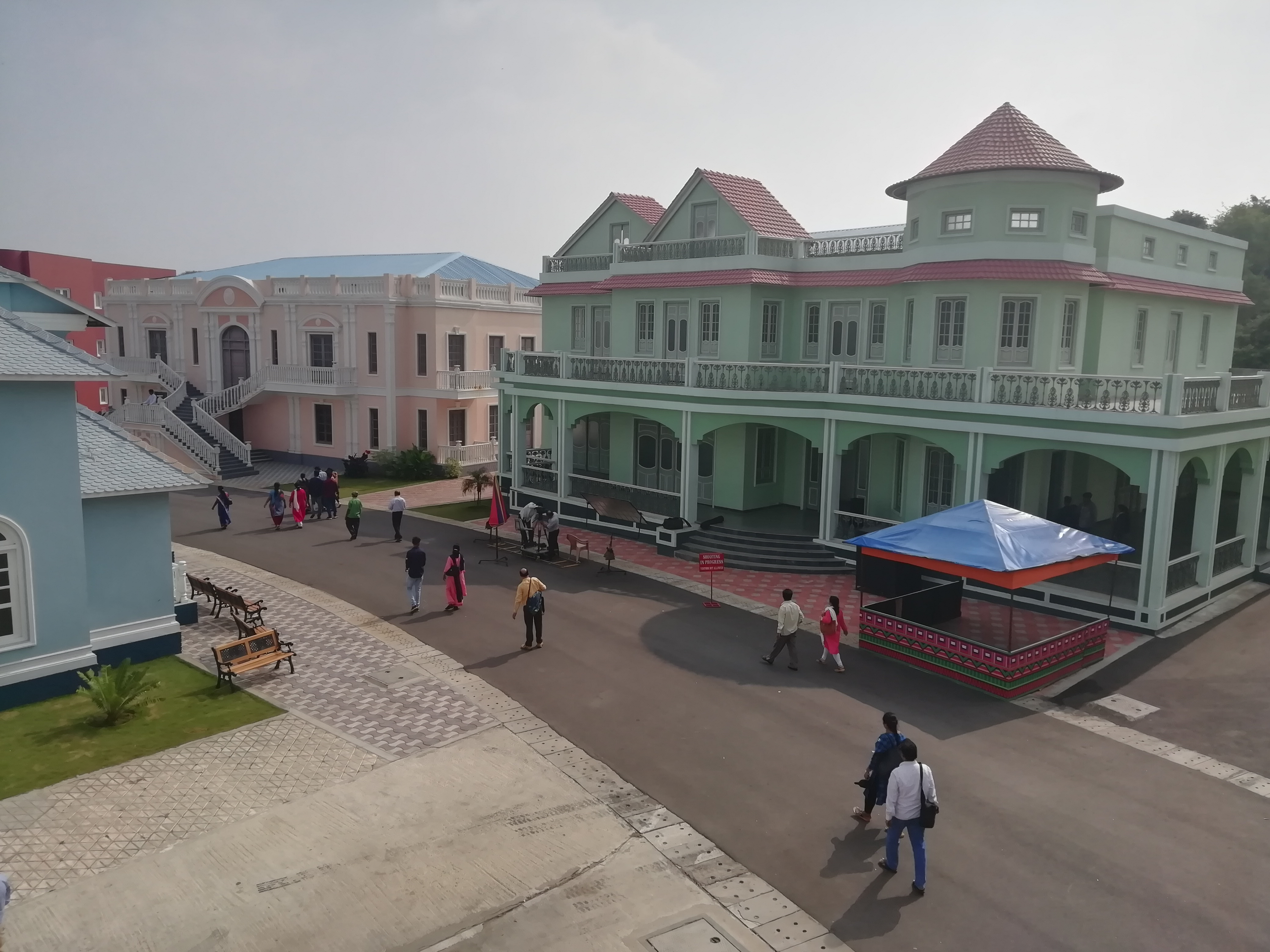
Film sets in Ramoji Film City

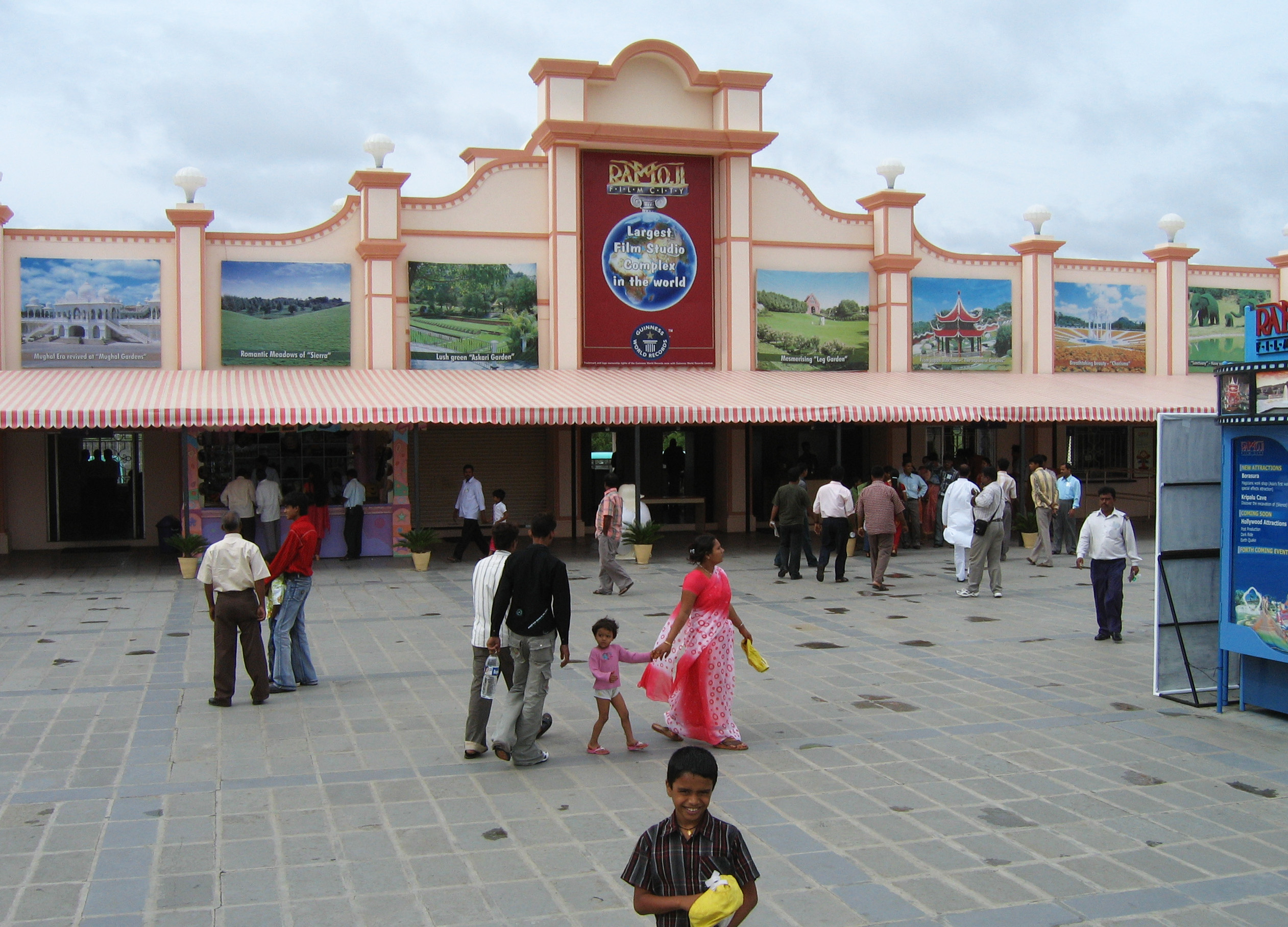
Views from Ramoji Film City

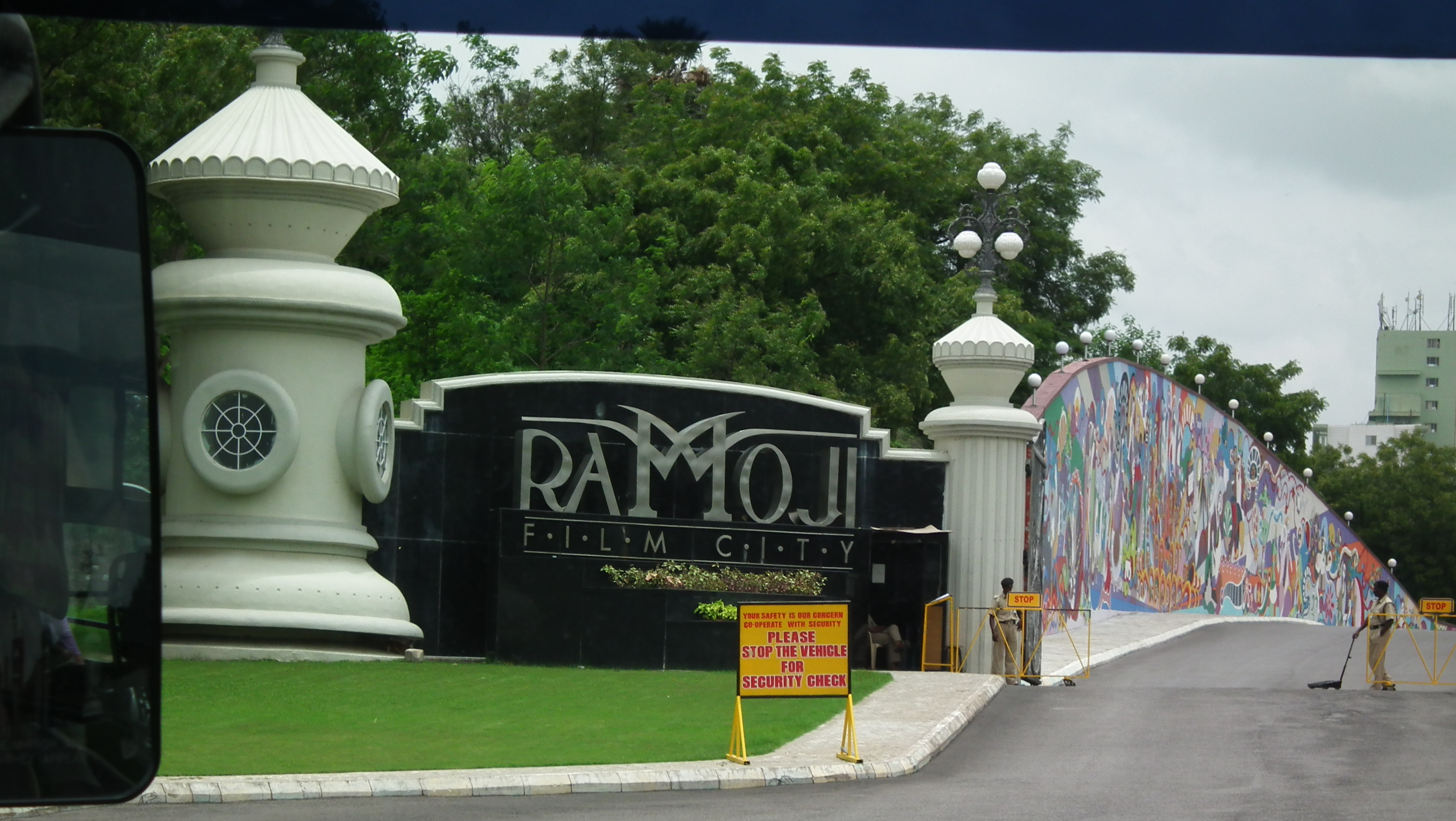
Photo from road to Main Fun area of Ramoji Film City

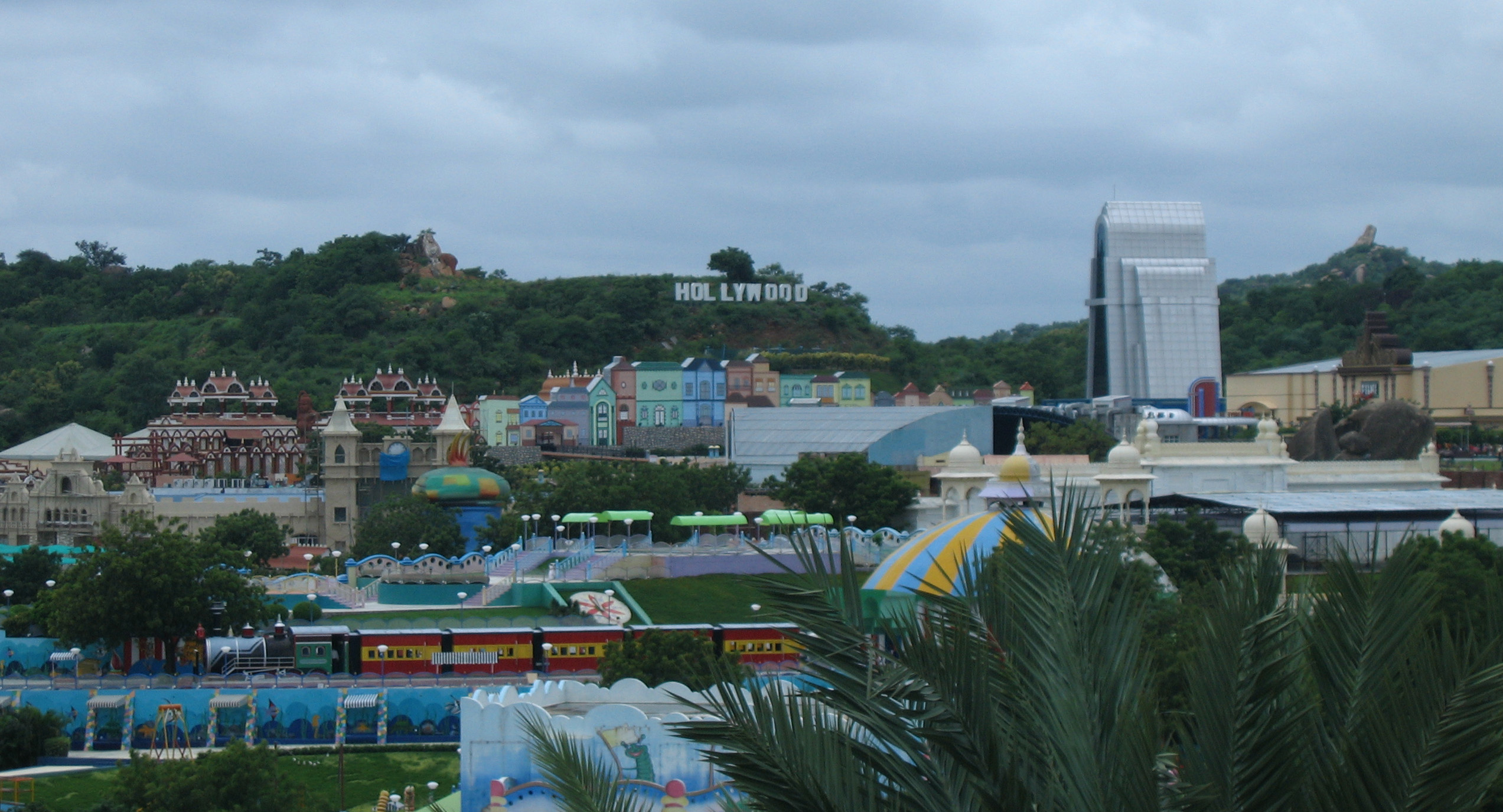
Views from Ramoji Film City

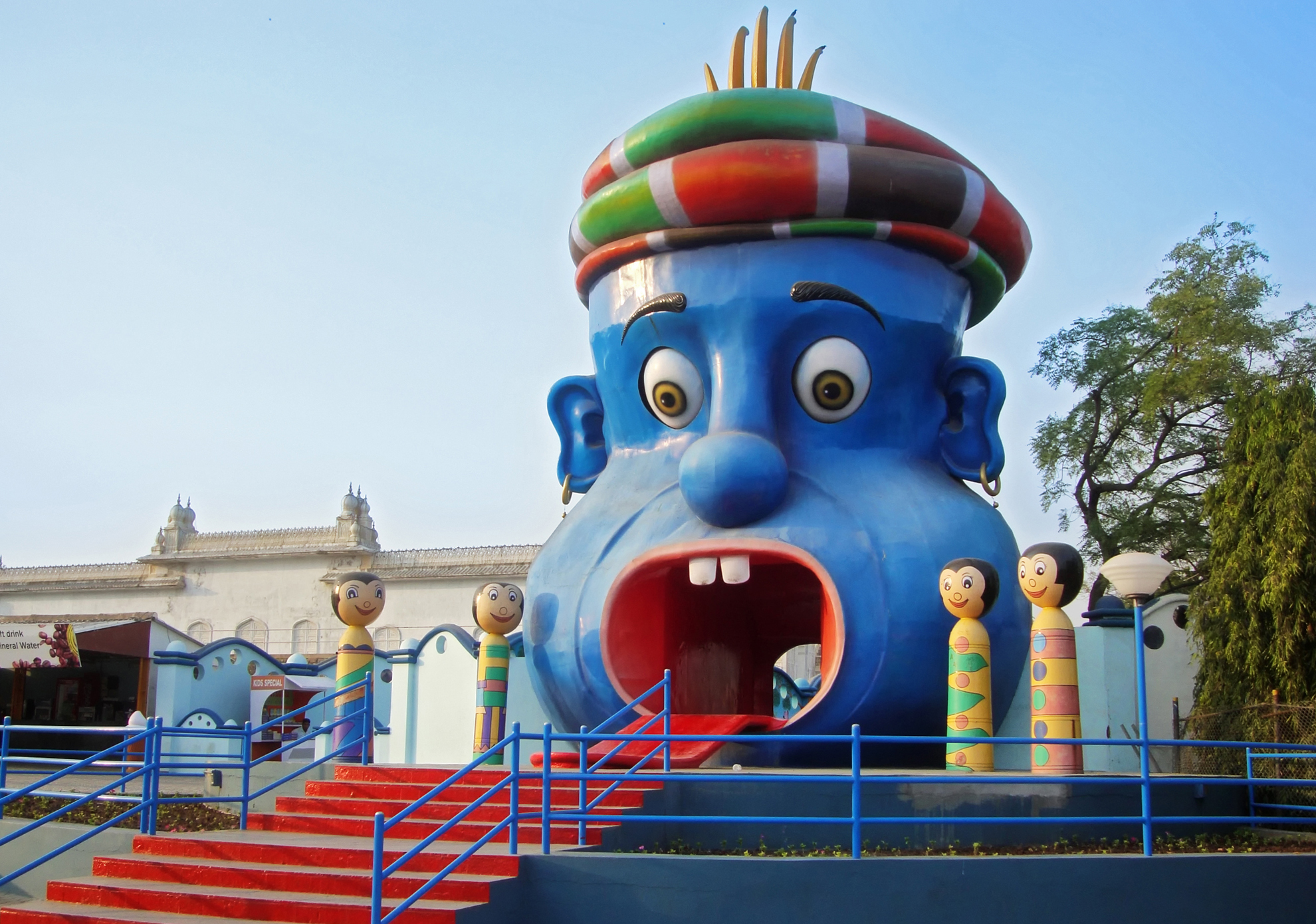
Ramoji Film City

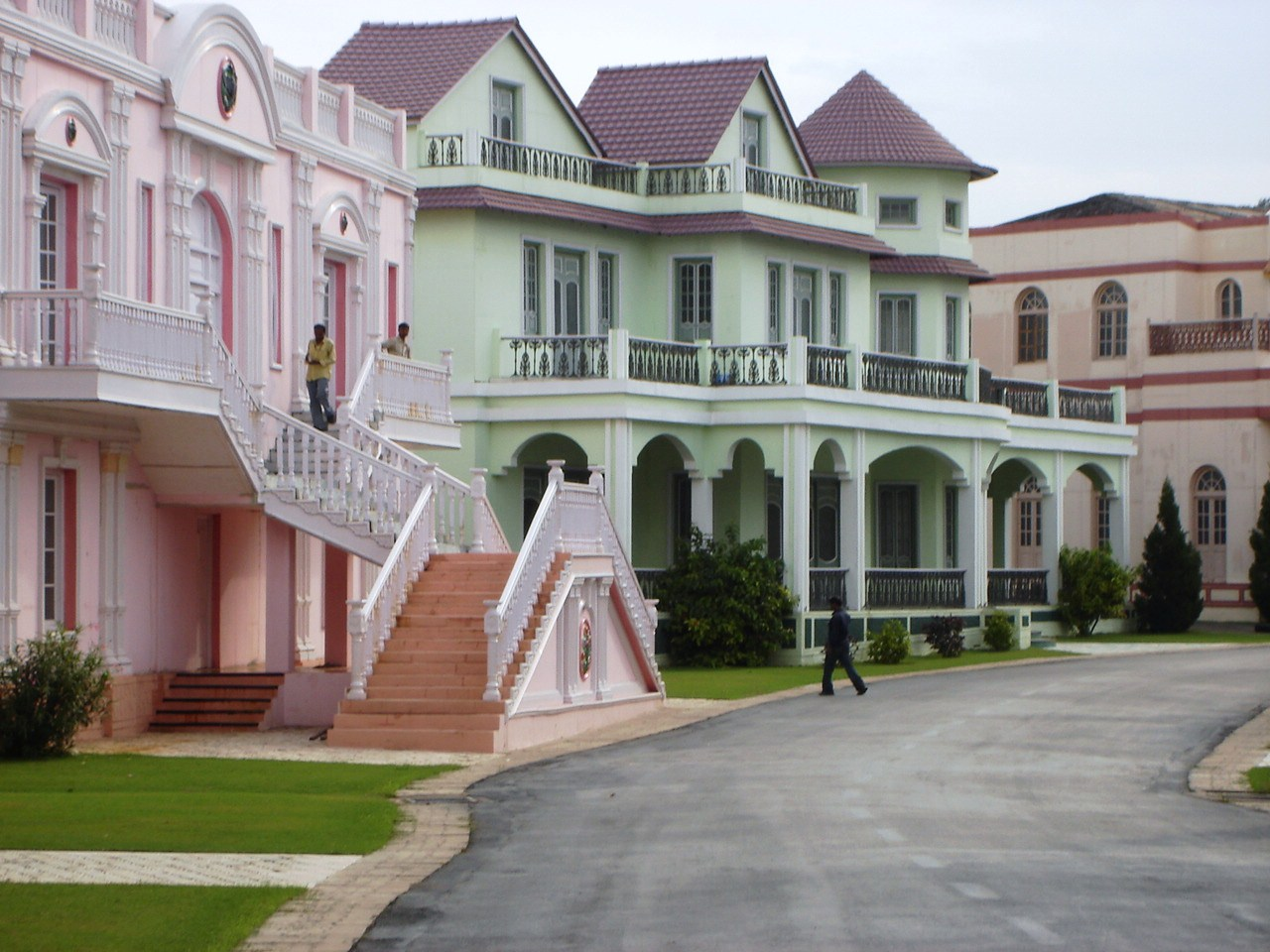
A set of England

== See also ==
- Telugu cinema
- Film City, Mumbai
- Film and Television Institute of India
- State Institute of Film and Television
