= Abdullapurmet =

- Village
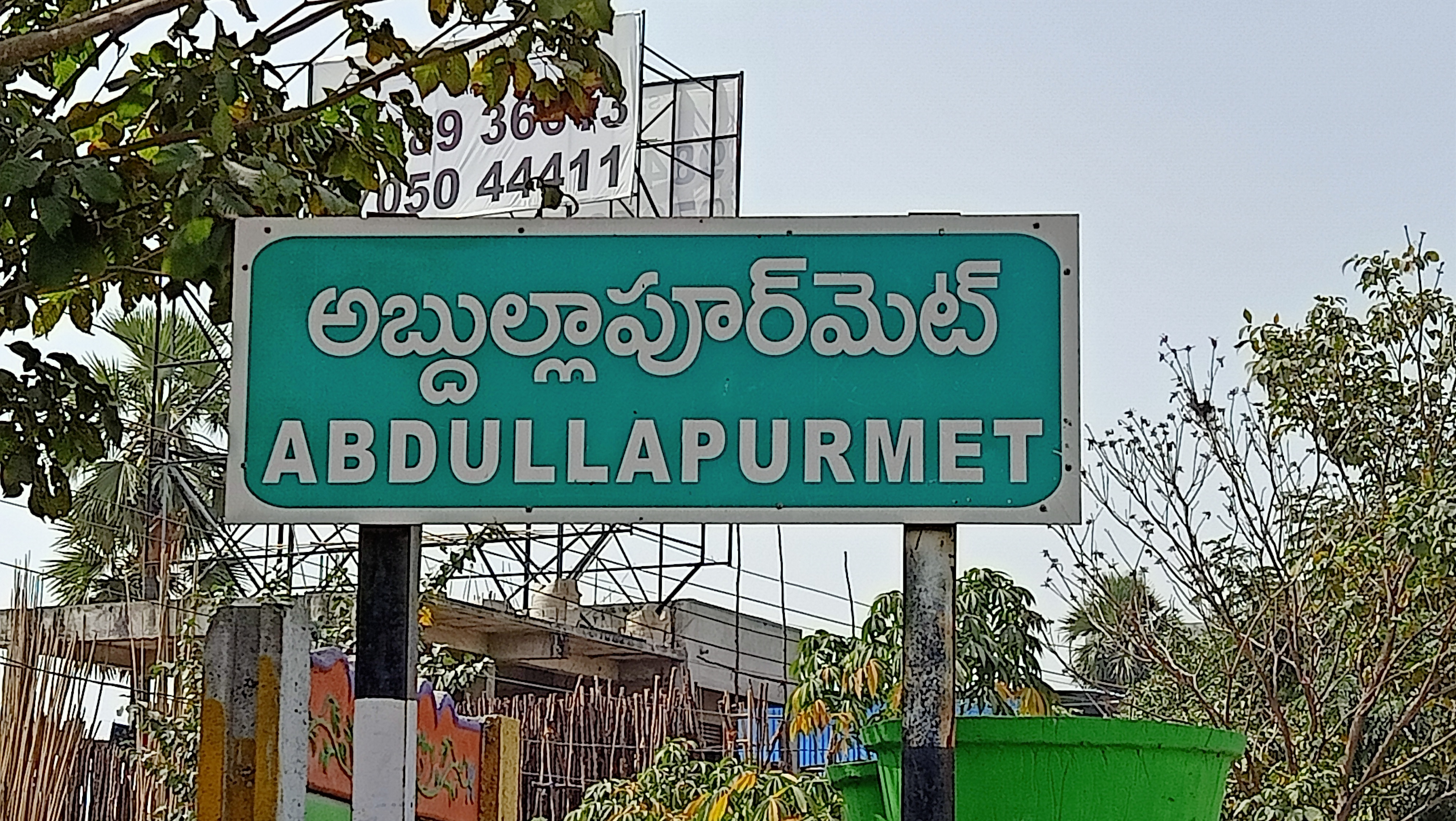
- Abdullapurmet Village Name Board

- Location in Telangana, India Abdullapurmet (Telangana) Abdullapurmet (India)
- Coordinates: 17°18′34.96″N 78°40′58.99″E
- Country: India
- State: Telangana

Languages
  - Official: Telugu
- Time zone: UTC+5:30 (IST)
- Telephone code: 040
- Vehicle registration: TG 07 X XXXX
- Website: telangana.gov.in

Abdullapur and Abdullapurmet together constitute a village and mandal in Ranga Reddy district in Telangana, India. Abdullapur is a village whereas Abdullapurmet is Mandal. It is 5 kilometers from the Outer Ring Road, Hyderabad. The world famous Ramoji Film City is in Abdullapurmet. Abdullapurmet is a developing residential locality on the outskirts of Hyderabad. It is located alongside Hyderabad-Suryapet Highway (NH-65). It has a population of about 5511. The male and female populations are 2822 and 2689 respectively. The size of the area is about 3.98 square kilometers.

The village was named after Qutub Shahi King Abdullah Qutub Shah, son of Hayath Bakshi Begum after whom its earlier mandal town Hayathnagar is named.
