= Hayathnagar =

Hayath Nagar
- Neighbourhood
- Hayath Nagar Hyderabad
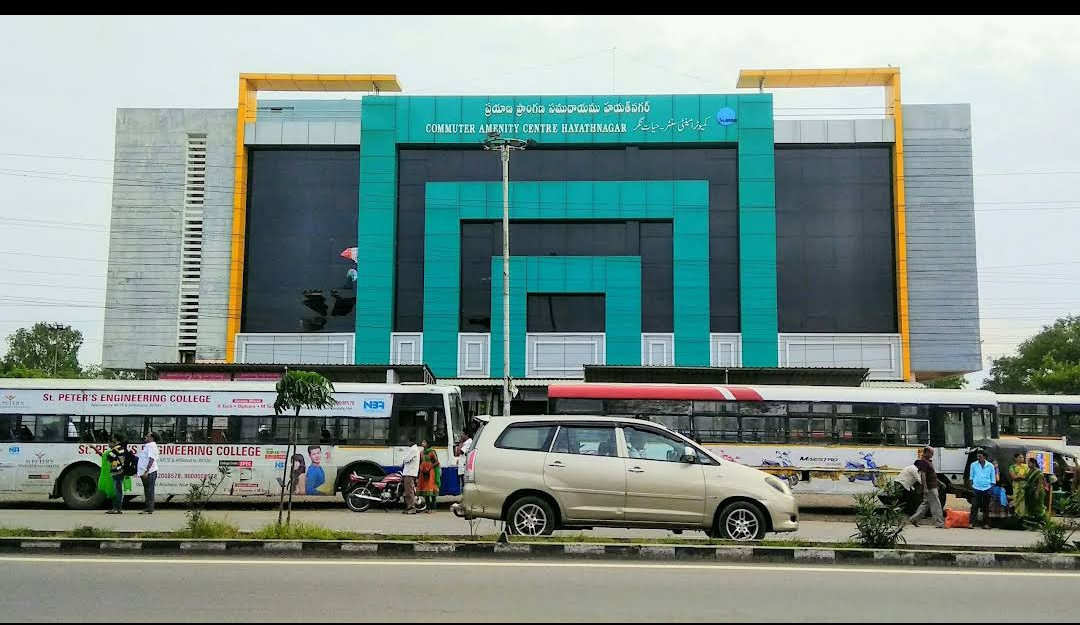
- TSRTC Hayathnagar City busstand

- Location within Hyderabad Location within Telangana Location within India
- Coordinates: 17.330°N 78.603°E
- Country: India
- State: Telangana
- Established: 17th century
- Founder: Begum Hayat Bakshi
- Named for: Begum Hayat Bakshi

Government
  - Type: GHMC
  - Body: Hayathnagar GHMC
- Elevation: 566 m (1,857 ft)

Population (2011)
  - Total: 35,467

Languages
  - Official: Telugu, Urdu
- Time zone: UTC+5:30 (IST)
- Postal codes: 500070 & 501505
- Telephone code: 040
- Vehicle registration: TG 07

Hayathnagar is a busy residential locality of Hyderabad in Ranga Reddy district of the Indian state of Telangana. It is mandal headquarter of Hayathnagar mandal of Hayathnagar revenue division. Hayathnagar forms circle No 3 in Greater Hyderabad Municipal Corporation. There are four wards – Nagole (11) Mansoorabad (12), Hayathnagar (13) and B. N. Reddy Nagar (14) – in this circle. It lies on National Highway 65.

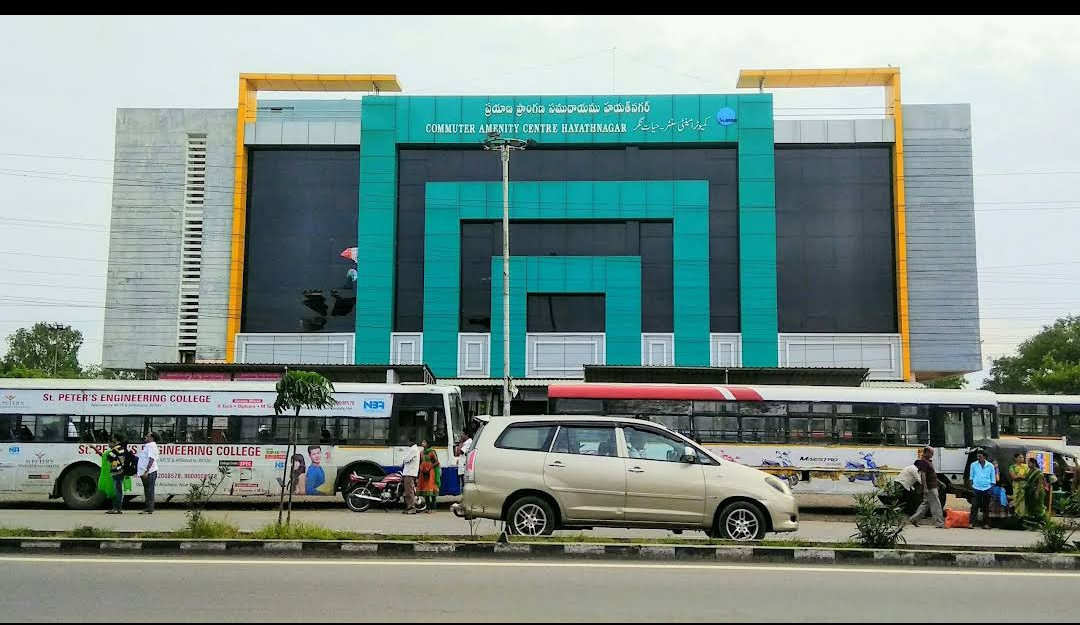
Hayathnagar

== History ==
In 1620, then ruler of Golconda, Sultan Muhammad Qutb Shah, decided to move his capital away from Golconda and Hyderabad. He selected a site about 6 miles (9.7 km) east of then Hyderabad, in what is today Saroornagar. The fort was named after himself and called Sultan Nagar Fort. The construction of this fort was abandoned by his wife Hayat Bakshi Begum who considered his sudden death in 1625 a bad omen. Later a new settlement known as Hayathnagar was established further east by the Begum. The Hayat Bakshi Mosque, located here, was commissioned by Begum Hayat Bakshi.

There is a Sai Baba Temple in Hayathnagar.

== See also ==
- Hayat Bakshi Mosque
- Sri Ramalingeswara Swamy Devalayam (Lord Shiva)
