= Dalmia =

Dalmia may refer to:

== Organizations ==
- Dalmia Group, an Indian conglomerate
- N. L. Dalmia Institute of Management Studies and Research, an educational institute in Mumbai, India
- Dalmia Dharamsala, a resthouse in Odisha, India

== People ==
- Dinesh Nandini Dalmia, Indian Hindi-language writer
- Himani Dalmia, Indian writer
- Jagmohan Dalmiya, cricket administrator
- Jaidayal Dalmia, Indian businessman
- Ritu Dalmia, Indian chef and restaurateur
- Sanjay Dalmia, Indian businessman
- Vishnu Hari Dalmia, Indian businessman
