= Indu Jain =

Indian businesswoman (1936–2021)

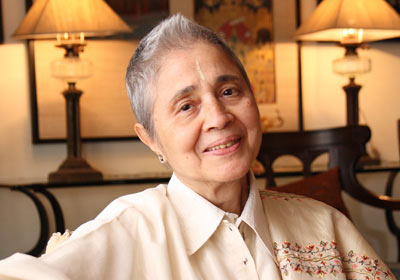
- Indu Jain in 2020
- Born: 8 September 1936; Ayodhya, United Provinces, British India
- Died: 13 May 2021 (aged 84); New Delhi, Delhi, India
- Occupations: Chairman and CEO of Bennett Coleman & Co Ltd.
- Known for: The Times Foundation; The Oneness Forum
- Spouse: Ashok Kumar Jain
- Children: Samir Jain, Vineet Jain

Indu Jain (8 September 1936 – 13 May 2021) was an Indian media executive and philanthropist. She belonged to the Sahu Jain family and was the chairperson of India's largest media group, popularly known as The Times Group.

As of 2006, Indu Jain had an estimated net worth of $2.4 billion, making her the 317th-richest person in the world. She was involved in philanthropy related to development and disaster relief, as well as literary endeavours.

== Career and philanthropy ==
In 1999, following the death of her husband, publishing magnate Ashok Kumar Jain, Indu Jain became chair of The Times Group, India's largest media group (formally named Bennett, Coleman & Co. Ltd). This group owns The Times of India and other newspapers and media outlets. In 2012, the Times Group employed 11,000 people, and controlled 38 per cent of the Indian newspaper market. The key to the success of the Times Group is that the newspapers are not about investigative reporting, but selling advertisements with large parts of the papers dedicated to Bollywood and paid editorials.

According to Forbes's 2006 rankings, Indu Jain had a net worth of $2.4 billion and was the 317th-richest person in the world. In 2006, Indu Jain filed charges against Forbes for breach of privacy and stated that the estimates were speculative. The Delhi High Court dismissed the case in October 2007. As of 2007, she was estimated to be the richest woman in Asia.

In 2000 Jain founded The Times Foundation, which she also chaired. The Times Foundation runs Community Services, Research Foundation and Times Relief Fund for relief from disasters such as floods, cyclones, earthquakes and epidemics. In 2000, Jain addressed the Millennium Peace Summit of Religious and Spiritual Leaders at the United Nations.

Jain was the founder and president of the ladies' wing of FICCI (FLO) as of March 2017. From 1999 to her death, she chaired the Bharatiya Jnanpith Trust, a literary organization founded by her father-in-law Sahu Shanti Prasad Jain in 1944. The Trust administers the Jnanpith award, the highest honour for authors writing in Indian languages.

Jain was an author, who published a two-volume Encyclopedia of Indian Saints and Sages in 2012 and 2019. Co-authored with N. K. Prasad and published by Times Group Books, the second instalment was launched at an event for World Environmental Day with religious leaders.

== Awards ==
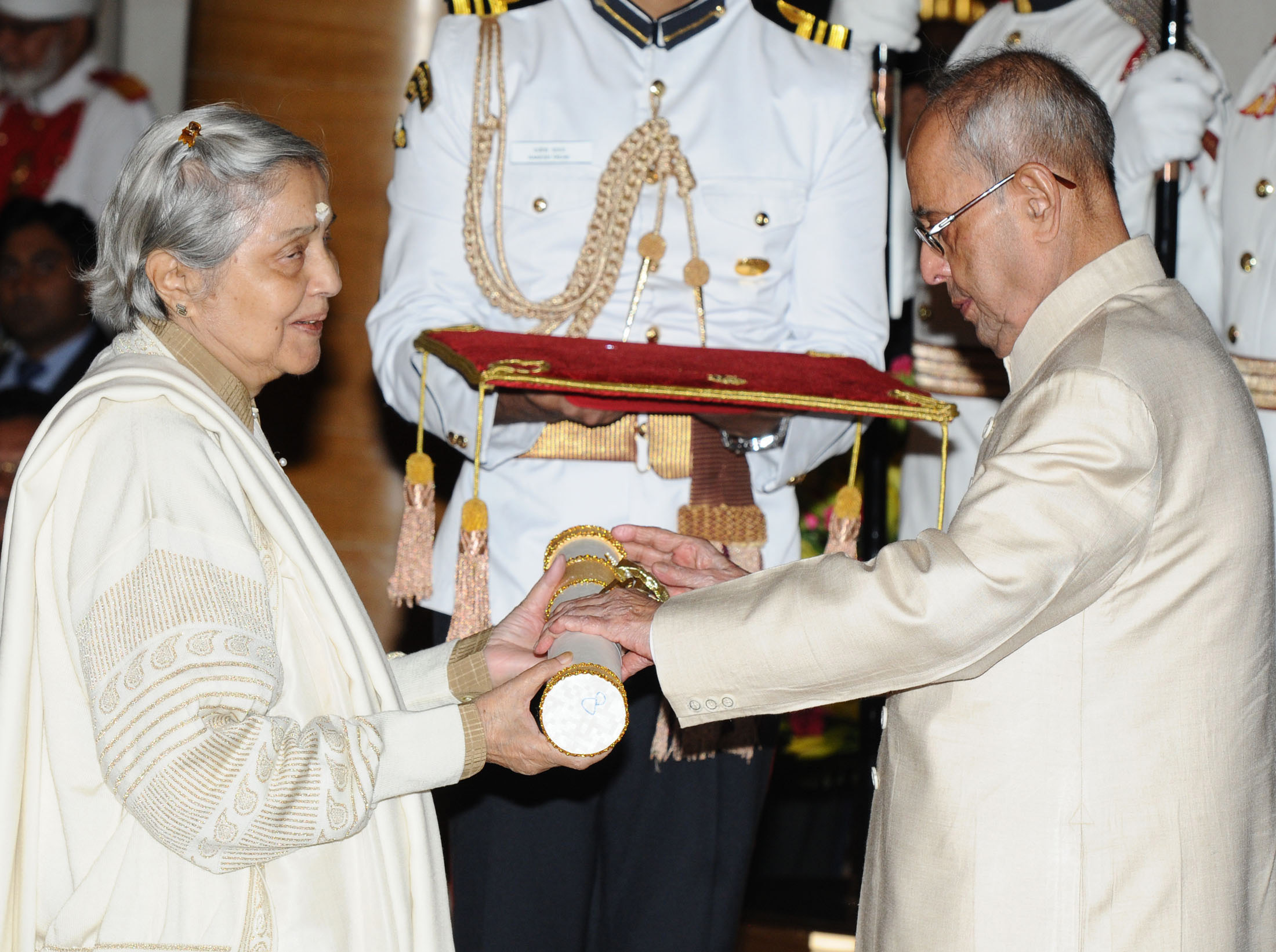
Indu Jain awarded Padma Bhushan Award by President Shri Pranab Mukherjee, 2016.

Indu Jain was awarded the Padma Bhushan by the government of India in January 2016.

In November 2019, she received the Lifetime Achievement award from the Institute of Company Secretaries of India "for translating excellence in corporate governance into reality".

She also won a Lifetime Contribution to Media award from the All India Management Association in 2018 as part of the group's annual Managing India Awards for excellence in leadership and nation building. She won a Lifetime Achievement Award from the Indian Congress of Women.

== Personal life ==
Indu Jain was married to Ashok Kumar Jain, with whom she had two sons, Samir and Vineet Jain, and a daughter.

She died on 13 May 2021 in Delhi due to complications from COVID-19.
