= Shreyans Prasad Jain =

Businessman

Sahu Shreyans Prasad Jain
- Born: 1908; Najibabad, United Provinces of Agra and Oudh
- Died: 1992 (aged 83–84)
- Other names: Shriyans Prasad Jain
- Organization: Dhrangadhra Chemical Works
- Title: President of the International Chamber of Commerce India
- Term: 1962
- Predecessor: Karam Chand Thapar
- Successor: Bharat Ram
- Board member of: Indian Express Group, Bharatiya Jnanpith
- Spouse: Kamlavati Jain
- Children: Gyan Chand, Prem Chand, Shashi Chand, Sharad Kumar, Pramod Kumar, Saroj Goenka
- Relatives: Sahu Shanti Prasad Jain (brother); B.D. Goenka (son-in-law)
- Awards: Padma Bhushan

Sahu Shreyans Prasad Jain (1908–1992) (also spelled as Shriyans Prasad Jain) was an Indian businessman, parliamentarian and a prominent member of the Jain community. He was the brother of notable businessman and philanthropist Sahu Shanti Prasad Jain. He was awarded Padma Bhushan for social work in 1988.

== Life ==
Shreyans Prasad was born in 1908 to the Sahu Jain family of Najibabad, related to The Times of India Group and the Dalmia Group. He took over the India's first soda ash factory founded in Dhrangadhra (est. 1925), and established the Dhrangadhra Chemical Works in 1939. He was the founder-chairman of this company, which is now known as DCW. His business group consisted of 12 companies in 1965.

Shriyans Prasad was a member of Rajya Sabha (upper house of the Indian Parliament) during 1952–1958. He was also the President of the International Chamber of Commerce's Indian chapter and FICCI during 1962. He also worked as the President of the Bharatiya Jnanpith, which was founded by his brother Shanti Prasad.

Sahu Shreyans Prasad Jain was married to Kamlavati Jain. The couple had five sons, Gyan Chand Jain, Prem Chand Jain, Shashi Chand Jain, Sharad Kumar Jain (d. 2008) and Pramod Kumar Jain. They also had one daughter Saroj, who married B.D. Goenka. Shreyans Prasad served on the board of directors of the Goenka family's Indian Express Group.

== Legacy ==
Several institutions are named after Shriyans Prasad Jain:

- Sahu Shriyans Prasad Jain Arts and Commerce College, Dhrangadhra (est. 1964)
- S.P. Jain Institute of Management & Research, Mumbai (es. 1981) popularly known as SPJIMR
- S P Jain School of Global Management - offers undergraduate, graduate and postgraduate business courses in Dubai (2004), Singapore (2006), Sydney (2012) and Mumbai (2015)
- Sahupuram in Tuticorin, Tamil Nadu (location of the DCW factory)
- Shriyans Prasad Charitable Trust, Mumbai (offers scholarships)
- SPJ Sadhana School, Mumbai
