= Dalmianagar =

- Town
- Location in Bihar, India
- Coordinates: 24°53′N 84°09′E
- Country: India
- State: Bihar
- District: Rohtas
- Elevation: 67 m (220 ft)

Population (2001)
  - Total: 29,962

Languages
  - Main: Bhojpuri
- Time zone: UTC+5:30 (IST)
- PIN: 821305
- Telephone code: 06184
- Lok Sabha constituency: Karakat
- Vidhan Sabha constituency: Dehri-on-Sone

Dalmianagar is a town that had one of the oldest and biggest industrial complexes in India. It is situated at Dehri-on-Sone on the banks of the Sone River in Rohtas district of Bihar. This is a city and a Municipality in Rohtas district in the state of Bihar, India, combinedly known as Dehri-Dalmianagar Nagar Palika.

== Dalmianagar ==
The industrial town of Dalmianagar was founded in 1930s by the industrialist Ramkrishna Dalmia, a doyen of business in 20th century India and founder of the Dalmia Group. He was assisted by his younger brother Jaidayal Dalmia and son in law Sahu Shanti Prasad Jain in establishing many factories of Rohtas Industries Ltd. in Dalmianagar.

The foundation stone of the sugar factory was laid in 1933; its machinery was imported from Glasgow, Scotland. Subsequently, the foundation stone of the cement factory was laid in 1937. Its machinery was imported from Denmark, and the plant was inaugurated by Netaji Subhas Chandra Bose in 1938. Installation of the paper factory commenced almost at the same time and was inaugurated by Babu Rajendra Prasad in 1939. This was soon followed by the establishment of the chemical factory that started operations in 1939; production of caustic soda, bleach liquor and bleaching powder started with the inception of the factory, and of hydrochloric acid and liquid chlorine in 1945 and 1950 respectively. A sulphuric acid plant was added in 1942. In 1943-44, an asbestos cement plant was established, that started production in 1946. The Vanaspati factory producing hydrogenated oil was started in 1944 and later a vulcanised fibre plant in 1954. A central mechanical workshop (including foundries and fabrication shop) and a power house supported the various factories in this vast Industrial Complex. Sugarcane supplies were supplemented to the sugar factory by opening the 16-mile Nasriganj-Dalmianagar Railway in 1957-58. During the same year the 25-mile Dehri-Rohtas Light Railway was extended 18 miles further south from Rohtas to Pipardih where the company's limestone quarries were located.

In 1948, after the Dalmia-Jain group split, Shanti Prasad Jain had taken over Rohtas Industries Ltd. from his father-in-law, and under his stewardship, Dalmianagar further developed into a massive industrial town with factories producing Sugar, Cement, Paper, Chemicals, Vanaspati, etc. employing top professionals of the country. Dalmianagar boasted of a vast housing colony, gardens, clubs, schools, market complexes, and hospitals for its employees. Rohtas Industries had their own private aircraft (a Beechcraft) in those days and a small air-field near Dalmianagar.

However, the prosperity of Dalmianagar started to decline in the mid 1970s as the law and order situation in this industrial town began to worsen. The local mafia indulged in dacoity and kidnapping. Frequent labour union issues, political interference, strikes and work stoppages adversely impacted the functioning of factories. Slowly, executives and professionals began to leave, and the factories were mismanaged. By the mid 1980s factories started to shut down. Massive electricity bills remained unpaid by Rohtas Industries to the State Electricity Board. There were irregularities in payment of salaries and wages to employees. By the 1990s Dalmianagar looked like a ghost town.

Indian Railways took over the factory land in Dalmianagar in 2007, when it acquired 219.5 acres from the closed Rohtas Industries Limited for a planned freight bogie and coupler factory.

The foundation stone for the factory was laid in November 2008. However, the project has faced delays and has not yet been fully realized.

== Rohtas Industries Dalmianagar and Dehri-Rohtas Light Railway ==
The Dehri Rohtas Light Railway started off as Dehri Rohtas Tramway Company in 1907 promoted by The Octavius Steel and Company of Calcutta. The original contract was to build a 40 km feeder line from Rohtas to the East Indian Railway's Delhi - Calcutta trunk route at Dehri-on-Sone. Soon thereafter, the tramway company was incorporated as a light railway in order to acquire the assets of the then defunct Dwara - Therria Light Railway in Assam. The DRLR opened to traffic in 1911 and was booming by 1913-14 when it carried over 50,000 passengers and 90,000 tons of freight, the goods traffic mainly consisting of marble and stone. In 1927, a 2.5 km spur was added to Rohtasgarh Fort from Rohtas.

Rohtas Industries brought the line up to Tiura Pipradih by adding another 25 km to the DRLR, most of which passed through their property.

The DRLR operated a very mixed bag of locomotives. It started off with 0-6-2 tank locomotives, three of which arrived from the Dwara - Therria Railway after it closed in 1909. In the pre IRS years, it also used 0-6-0, 0-4-0 (Sentinel) and 0-6-4 variants of tank locomotives. After the wartime increase in traffic the railway brought as many as eight new ZB class 2-6-2 tender locomotives, orders for which were equally split between Hudswell Clarke and Krauss Maffei. At its peak, the DRLR used to operate two daily passengers trains in each direction from Dehri-on-Sone and Tiura Pipradih, a run of 67 km. Apart from this the railway carried marble and stone traffic to the mainline at Dehri on sone.

The railway also purchased several locomotives second hand notable among which were the A/1 class 2-8-4 tank locomotives built by Hudswell Clarke that arrived from the Pulgaon - Arvi system of Central Railway in 1959. Other unique locomotives that operated on DRLR were the several ex. Kalka - Simla Railway K class 2-6-2 tank engines by Kerr Stuart and 2-6-4 tank engines by Henschel that arrived from the Shahdara - Saharanpur Light Railway.

Due to the decline in traffic and competition to road in the late 1970s, the DRLR succumbed and closed to traffic on 16 July 1984.

Although the DRLR was a hotspot for narrow gauge enthusiasts from Europe in the 1970s, not much has appeared about it in the media since its closure. Brian Manktelow from London, England decided to unravel the fate of DRLR rolling stock in 1994 and visited the area. Below is a brief trip report:

An unannounced chance visit to the Rohtas Industries works 19 January 1994 proved very fruitful. After making personal contact with the management, we were given permission and a guide to visit all three sites.

== Education ==
The notable educational institutions in Dalmianagar are Model School, Dalmianagar High School.
