= Vineet Jain =

Indian businessman (born 1966)

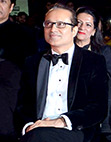
- Jain in 2016 at the 61st Britannia Filmfare Awards
- Born: 1967 or 1968 (age 58–59); Calcutta, India
- Citizenship: Indian
- Occupations: MD of The Times Group
- Parent(s): Indu Jain; Ashok Kumar Jain
- Relatives: Samir Jain; Sahu Ramesh Chandra Jain; Sahu Shanti Prasad Jain; Ramkrishna Dalmia

Vineet Jain (born 1966) is an Indian entrepreneur and current Managing Director of Bennett, Coleman & Co. Limited (B.C.C.L.), India's oldest and largest media group in India, also known as The Times Group.

== Early life and education ==
Vineet Jain was born in Kolkata. He graduated from the American College of Switzerland.

== The Times Group ==
Jain joined The Times Group in 1987. He is the great-grandson of Ramkrishna Dalmia, the founder of The Times Group and Dalmia Group. Jain's grandfather Shanti Prasad Jain, father Ashok Jain and mother Indu Jain all served as chairperson of B.C.C.L. His sister Nandita Judge also worked at the company.

Jain handles the day-to-day operations of the group's entertainment and TV businesses.

== Family and personal life ==
Jain is divorced. He splits his time between homes he shares with his brother in New Delhi and Mumbai.

== Awards ==
- 'Best Industrialist of the year' Rajiv Gandhi Award in 2009.
- Impact Person of the Year Award in 2013.
- Entrepreneur of the Year Award from The Bombay Management Association in 2013.
- Media Person of the Year award from International Advertising Association in 2015
- Art Karat Award in 2018.
- ITA Sterling Icon of Indian Entertainment Award in Media category in 2009.
