= Najibabad Mosque =

Mosque in Uttar Pradesh, India

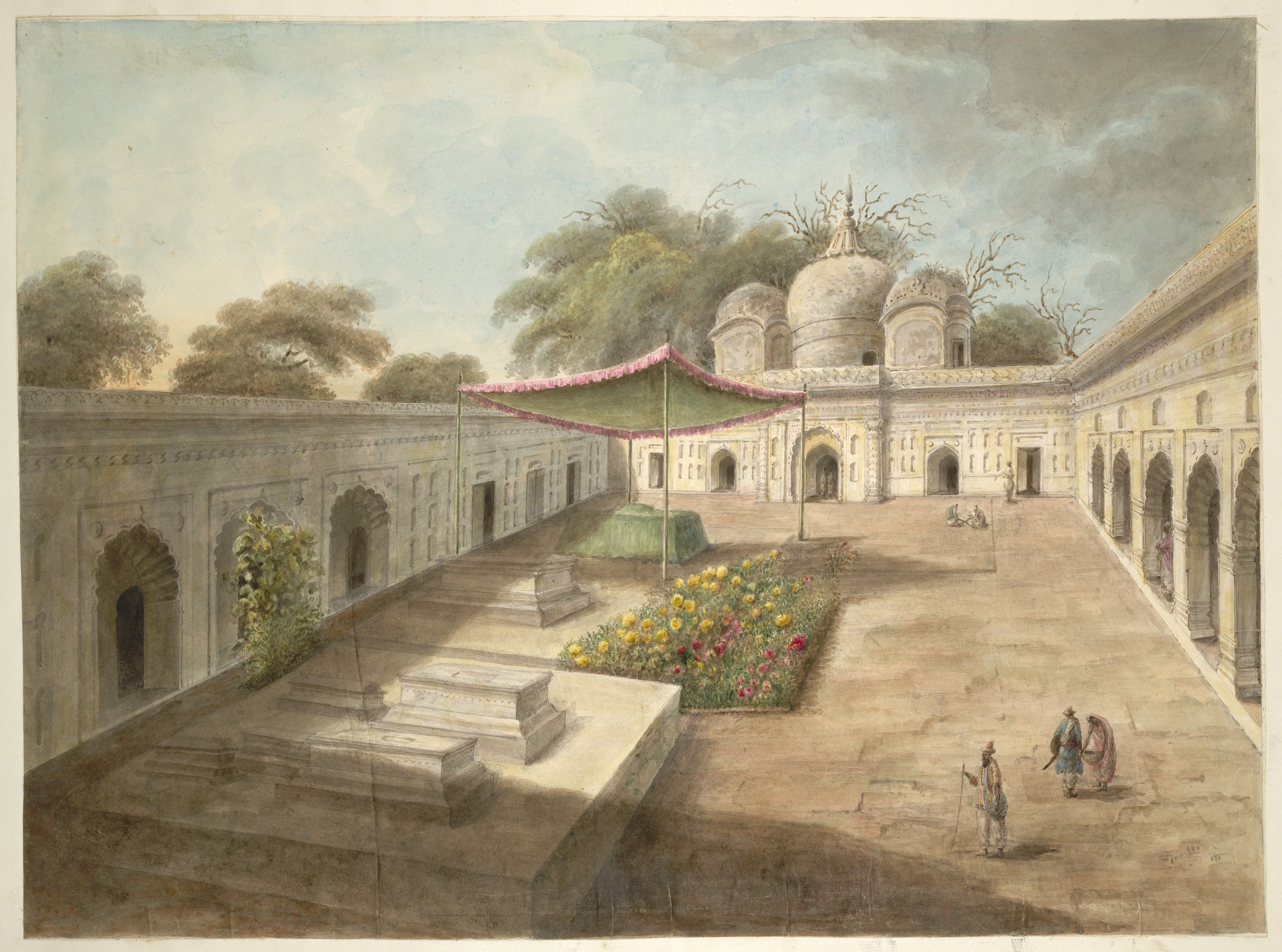
- The mosque, from inside the Najibabad Fort, in c. 1814

- Location of the mosque in Uttar Pradesh

Religion
- Affiliation: Islam
- Ecclesiastical or organizational status: Friday mosque
- Leadership: Maulana Ishaakh Mansoori
- Status: Active

Location
- Location: Najibabad, Bijnor district, Moradabad, Uttar Pradesh
- Country: India
- Interactive map of Najibabad Mosque
- Coordinates: 29°36′50″N 78°20′42″E

Architecture
- Type: Mosque architecture
- Style: Mughal
- Founder: Najib ad-Dawlah
- Completed: 1797 CE

Specifications
- Capacity: 1,200 worshippers
- Length: 21 m (70 ft)
- Width: 31 m (101 ft)
- Interior area: 539.0 m^{2} (5,802 sq ft)
- Height (max): 20 m (67 ft)
- Dome: Three
- Minaret: Four
- Minaret height: 20 m (65 ft)
- Site area: 3,499 m^{2} (37,660 sq ft)

The Najibabad Mosque, also known as Jama Masjid Najibabad, is a Friday mosque, located in Najibabad, in the Bijnor district of the Moradabad division, in the state of Uttar Pradesh, India.

Najib ad-Dawlah built the Najibabad Fort in 1755, one of oldest Mughal Empire historic monuments in Bijnor district. It is believed that the mosque was completed in 1797.

== See also ==
- Islam in India
- List of mosques in India
