= B. D. Goenka =

Indian journalist

Bhagwan Das Goenka was the only son of Ramnath Goenka, a newspaper baron of India. He was a manager of The Indian Express and had been described as the "inveterate foe" of the Nehru family".

His wife, Saroj, is the daughter of Shreyans Prasad Jain, after whom the SP Jain College in Mumbai is named. She is thus a first cousin of Ashok Kumar Jain, whose sons own the Times of India. The couple were the parents of three daughters, namely Arati Agarwal, Ritu Goenka and Kavita Singhania. The youngest daughter, Kavita, is married to Yadupati Singhania, a member of the JK Singhania family.

== Death ==
Goenka died as a result of a cardiac arrest in 1979. He was survived by his father, wife and three daughters. In his memory, the "B.D. Goenka award" was established in 1979 by his father, Ramnath, to recognise contributions made by individuals in building and furthering the cause of journalism.
