= Tomb of Najib-ud-Daula =

- Location: Najibabad, Uttar Pradesh
- Type: Mausoleum
- Completion date: 1751; 275 years ago

The Tomb of Najib-ud-Daula is an 18th-century mausoleum built for Mughal commander and Afghan Rohilla Chieftain Najib-ud-Daula. The mausoleum dates from 1751, and is in Najibabad, Uttar Pradesh, India.

== See also ==
- Tomb of Mariam-uz-Zamani
- Tomb of Akbar the Great
- Tomb of Shuja-ud-Daula
- Tomb of I'timād-ud-Daulah
