= Jaidayal Dalmia =

Indian businessperson

- Born: 1904
- Died: 1993 (aged 88–89)
- Occupation: Industrialists

Jaidayal Dalmia (1904–1993) was born into Hindu Agarwal family and was one of the leading industrialists and philanthropists of India. He was one of the co-founders of Dalmia Group and younger brother of Ramkrishna Dalmia

== Early life ==
Jaidayal Dalmia was born on 11 December 1904 in town of Chirawa in Rajasthan.

He started his early education in Calcutta and learned Bangla. Later on, after moving to Chirawa he studied till matriculation.

=== Business ===
He learned his business from his elder brother and played a major role in establishing Dalmia Industries and later founded Dalmia Cements in 1935, which is now run by his sons and grandsons.

In the year 1932–33 Ramkrishna along with a businessman from Bihar Nirmalkumar Jain started a sugar mill, Jaidayal was appointed to look after the mill, with his keen interest and dedication he got the mill commissioned within short span of 1 year. Within a year one more sugar mill, Rohtas Industries Ltd was started near Dehri-on-sone at Dalmianagar. Jaidayal supported his elder brother in all his ventures and showed immense interest in the business. Later on, Dehri-on-sone was named .

In few years Ramkrishna and Jaidayal established six cement factories in, Dandot, Kallakudi, Rajgangpur, Charkhi Dadri and one more factory at Shantinagar, Karachi. Jaidayal played a major role in getting the machinery from Europe. He imported improved technology, which not only make his competitor's technology obsolete, he also forced Danish to reduce their price of exporting Wet Process Technology in India.

With wide interest in machinery, Jaidayal Dalmia played major role in technical functions of all the factories in Dalmianagar and other plants as well. Soon after establishing the Rajgangpur factory called Orissa Cements. Jaidayal later started fire bricks refractory in Rourkela in the year 1954.

Ramkrishna Dalmia ventured in banking sector and started Bharat Bank with branches at many places in India. He also entered in Aviation business and acquired interests in Bharat Insurance Company and controlling interests in Punjab National Bank. In the automotive sphere, one company of the Group, Allen Berry & Co. Limited, purchased the entire lot of American surplus disposal vehicles, numbering about 50,000, after World War II. This company ran vast workshops in various parts of India till the 1950s when it was disbanded. Knowing that media played an extremely major part in the development of the nation, he acquired Times of India and started news paper in Hindi & Bengali as well. He purchased Govan Bros. and ventured in Chemicals too. At the time, the Dalmia companies together ranked third among India's major industrial groups after the Tatas and the Birlas.

Shortly after the independence, the Dalmia empire was divided among Ramkrishna Dalmia, Jaidayal Dalmia and Sahu Shanti Prasad Jain, son-in-law of Ramkrishna. Dalmianagar and publishing co. Bennett, Coleman & Co. Ltd. was handed over to Sahu Shanti Prasad Jain and Jaidayal Dalmia got the cement factories of Rajgangpur, Dalmiapuram and two factories of Pakistan. In the year 1964 both factories in Pakistan were sold off.

Jaidayal Dalmia was associated with many companies, worked as managing director of sugar, distillery and other factories. He was also the Technical Director of first ever cement factory in Uttar Pradesh established in Churk. He also held positions of chairman, director, Technical Director of public limited companies like, cement, sugar, distillery, paper, vanaspati ghee, refractories, ceramics, magnetite, financing, insurance and different industries.

=== Family ===
He was married to Krishna Devi and had seven sons and two daughters. The name of his sons are Vishnu Hari Dalmia, Nar Hari Dalmia, Mridu Hari Dalmia, Jai Hari Dalmia, Ajay Hari Dalmia, Yadu Hari Dalmia and Raghu Hari Dalmia, who inherited their stakes in Dalmia Group after his demise in 1993. He had two daughters Uma Devi and Usha Devi.

=== Philanthropy ===
He was great philanthropist and from 1951 onwards established many trusts that run private hospitals, schools, widow houses, dharamshalas, etc. He was vocal social reformist, who supported anti cow-slaughter movement and was deeply involved in construction of Krishna Jamnabhoomi Kesava Deo Temple.

Extended financial help to victims of flood, drought, earthquake and riots. Gave scholarships to deserving and poor students. Also, helped in marriage of girls from financially weaker families.

His elder brother Ramkrishna Dalmia and Jaidyal Dalmia, they together founded many trusts of which some are noted like Ramkrishna Jaidayal Dalmia Shreevani Alankaran is an award given or excellence in Sanskrit language and literature. and Dalmia Trust Water Environment awards for outstanding works for water harvesting and environment conservation are given by another trust named Sri Ramkrishna Jaidayal Dalmia Sewa Sansthan founded by two brothers, which operated from their native village Chirawa in Jhunjhunu district of Rajasthan.

After announcing his retirement from his profession, he was Managing Trustee of Shri Krishna Janmsthan Sewa Sansthan, Mathura for two decades and helped in construction of temples. He also handled the publishing literature of the trust. He had interest in various religious and charitable trusts helping poor, handicapped, blind and needy.

=== Author ===
He was also the author of books like – Theology and Untouchability (Dharmshashtra aur Asprishyata) and A Review of beef in ancient India (Pracheen Bharat mein Gomaans – Ek samiksha) published in 1971. He was also involved in publishing and translation of many Bengali Vaishnav literature to Hindi.
