= Sahu Jain family =

Industrial family of India

- Current region: Najibabad, Bijnor district, Uttar Pradesh, India
- Members: Rai Bahadur Jagmundar Das Jain; Sahu Shanti Prasad Jain; Shreyans Prasad Jain; Sahu Shital Prasad Jain; Sahu Ramesh Chandra Jain; Sahu Sumat Prasad Jain; Sahu Jinendra Kumar Jain; Sahu Phool Chand Jain; Ashok Kumar Jain; Indu Jain; Samir Jain; Vineet Jain
- Distinctions: Owners of Bennett, Coleman & Co. Ltd.

The Sahu Jain family is an industrial family of India. They own Bennett, Coleman & Co. Ltd. (commonly known as The Times Group), which owns The Times of India, the most-circulated English-language newspaper in the world. The members of the extended family have interests in education (S P Jain School of Global Management), chemicals (DCW Ltd.) and finance (DoubleDot Ltd. and Crescent Finstock Ltd).

The family are from the Jain community and has its origins in the small town of Najibabad, Bijnor district (near Meerut, Muzaffarnagar, 180 km from Delhi), present-day Uttar Pradesh, India.The family is known for its philanthropic works, and its members have historically served as leaders and prominent figures in the Digambar Jain community. Figures like Sahu Shanti Prasad Jain and Sahu Ramesh Chandra Jain are recognised as leaders of the worldwide or all-India Jain community. The family has also been involved in the construction and restoration of several Jain shrines (tirthas) across India. notably, the family played a pivotal role in the 1981 Mahamastakabhisheka at Shravanabelagola, facilitation the conservation and celebration of the monolithic Gommateshwara statue.

== Members ==
The leading members of the family have been Rai Bahadur Jagmundar Das Jain, Sahu Shanti Prasad Jain, Sahu Shreyans Prasad Jain, Sahu Ramesh Chandra Jain, Ashok Kumar Jain, Indu Jain, Samir Jain, Vineet Jain and Sahu Deepak Jain.

The Jnanpith Awards are given by the Bharatiya Jnanpith organization founded by the family. The group has also founded a few other awards that are coveted honours in the fields of fashion, movies and business in India, namely the Miss India title, Filmfare Awards and the Economic Times Awards.

The Times Group has diversified into many fields. The Times of India (the world's largest circulated English-language newspaper), The Economic Times, FM Radio Mirchi, the biweekly magazine Femina India, the Indiatimes portal, the 24 hours English news channel Times Now, the Bollywood news and music channel Zoom are all owned by the Sahu Jain family.

== See also ==
- Shah (Jain family name)
- Nattal Sahu
