= Sahu Ramesh Chandra Jain =

Indian businessman

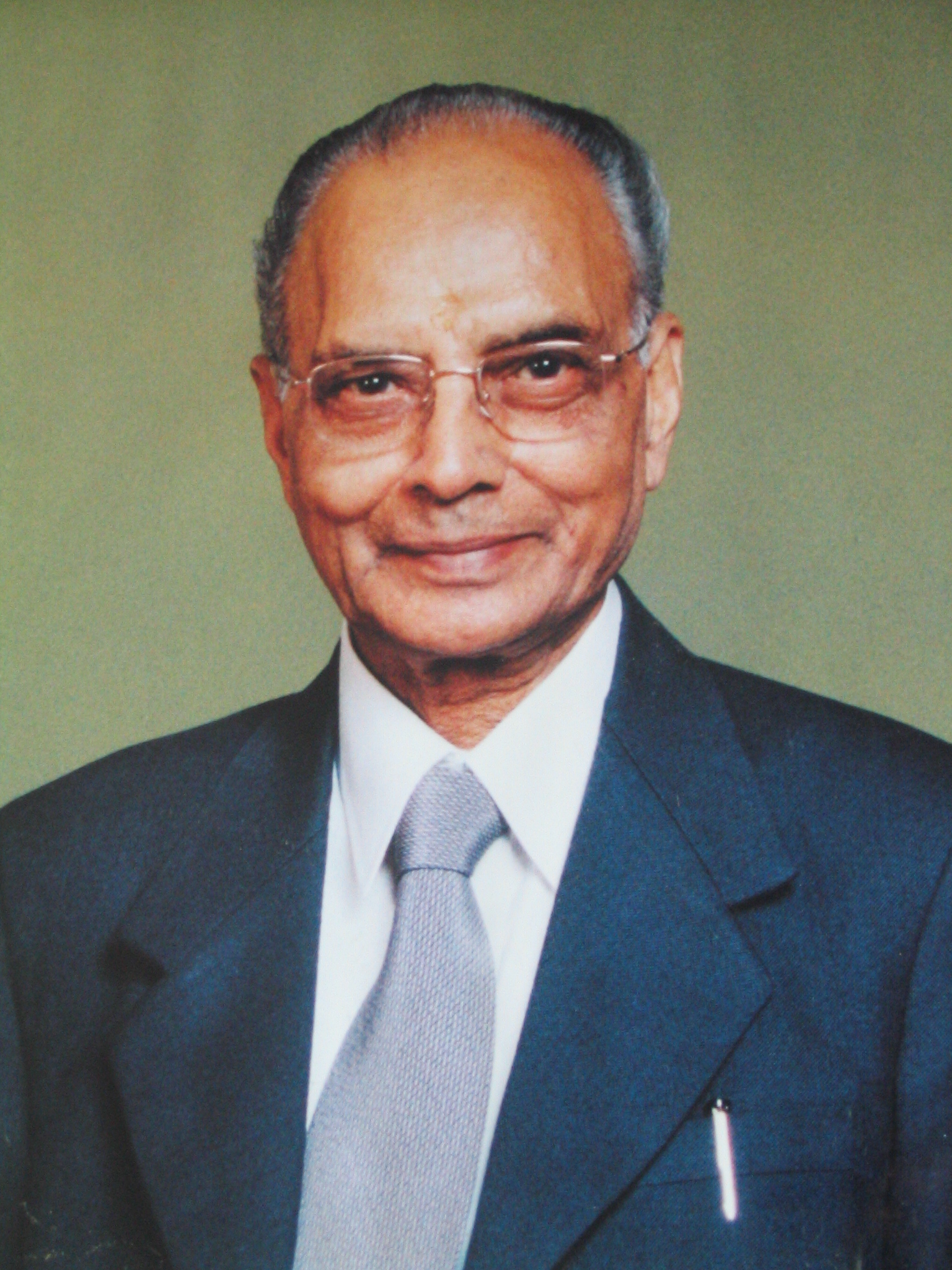
- Born: 15 August 1925; Najibabad
- Died: 22 September 2004 (aged 79); New Delhi
- Education: Indian Institute of Technology (BHU) Varanasi
- Occupations: Mediaperson, Philanthropist
- Years active: 1951–2004
- Children: Akhilesh Jain, Shailesh Jain

Sahu Ramesh Chandra Jain (15 August 1925 – 22 September 2004) was an Indian media publisher, philanthropist, promoter of Indian literature, and prominent member of the Jain religion. Born in Najibabad in Uttar Pradesh, he was a member of the Sahu Jain family, prominent in the media industry. During his career of over 40 years with The Times of India Publishing Group, he held positions including managing editor, managing director, and commercial manager of The Times of India in Delhi.

He was the president of the Indian Newspaper Society (INS). His board positions included chairman of the board of directors of the Press Trust of India (PTI) in 1978, and chairman of the Indian Institute of Mass Communication (IIMC), New Delhi. As managing trustee of Bharatiya Jnanpith, the literary organisation founded by his family, he published and promoted literary works translated from all major Indian languages.
