= Akbar Shah Khan Najibabadi =

Indian Muslim historian

Personal life
- Born: 1875 Najibabad, Bijnor, United Provinces of British India
- Died: 10 May 1938 (aged 62–63)
- Notable work(s): Tarikh-e-Islam
- Occupation: Historian

Religious life
- Religion: Islam (birth — 1906); Ahmadiyyah (1906 — 1915); Islam (1916 — death)
- Denomination: Sunni Islam

Akbar Shah Khan Najibabadi (1875 – 10 May 1938) was an Indian Sunni Muslim historian who wrote Tarikh-e-Islam in three volumes.

== Biography ==
Najibabadi was born in 1875 in Najibabad, Bijnor, United Provinces of British India. He began teaching in Najibabad Middle School in 1897 and later taught Persian in High School, Najibabad.

During 1906 and 1914, he stayed in Qadian and embraced Ahmadism. He drew close to Hakeem Noor-ud-Din, Mirza Ghulam Ahmad’s successor, and wrote his biography entitled Mirqat al-Yaqin fi Hayati Nur al-Din in two volumes, the second of which remained unpublished because of his reversion back to Sunni Islam. In Qadian, Najibabadi was superintendent of the Madrasa Nur al-Islam of Ahmadis for five years.

After Noor-ud-Din's death, Najibabadi turned to Mirza Basheer-ud-Din Mahmood Ahmad but could not agree with him more. Until the middle of 1915, Najibabadi associated with the Lahori group of Ahmadis. After being associated with the Lahori group for sometime, he reverted to Sunni Islam.

In 1916, Najibabadi started a monthly journal entitled Ibrat, contributors to which included Abdul Halim Sharar and Aslam Jairajpuri. Muhammad Iqbal also published poems in it. He managed Zamindar for one year during the imprisonment of Zafar Ali Khan and also wrote for Mansoor, Lahore.

Najibabadi developed a stomach Illness in June 1937, which lead to his death on 10 May 1938.

== Literary works ==
Najibabadi's works include:

- Tarikh-e-Islam (3-volumes)
- Tarikh-e-Najibabad
- Jang-e-Angura
- Nawab Ameer Khan
- Gaay awr Uski Tarikhi Azmat
- Ved awr Uski Qudamat
- Hindu awr MusalmanoN ka ittefaq
- Aaina Haqeeqat Numa.
