= Ashok Kumar Jain =

Industrialist and philanthropist

- Born: 25 September 1934; Rajasthan
- Died: 4 February 1999 (aged 64); Cleveland, United States
- Occupations: Industrialist and Philanthropist, Chairman Bennett, Coleman & Co. Ltd.
- Spouse: Indu Jain
- Children: 3, including Samir Jain and Vineet Jain
- Father: Sahu Shanti Prasad Jain
- Relatives: Sahu Ramesh Chandra Jain

Ashok Jain (1934 – 4 February 1999) was the Chairman of Bennett, Coleman & Co., the parent company of The Times of India and other large newspapers.

== FERA violation charges ==
Ashok Jain was indicted and arrested in 1998, a year before his death, in connection with an alleged violation of the FERA (Foreign Exchange Regulation Act). Again, the Times was accused of distorting facts pertaining to the case, even giving Ashok's indictment by the Enforcement Directorate the tint of a larger conspiracy against the Jain community in general. Adding to the controversy were sacked editor H.K. Dua's claims that his dismissal was retaliation for his refusal to comply with Ashok Jain's request to help him out by using his editorial position to build up public support besides lobbying with politicians. The ED, Delhi, arrested Jain from his Carmichael Road residence in Mumbai after 18 months in various courts.

== Personal ==
Jain was married to Indu Jain by whom he had two sons, Samir Jain, Vineet Jain and a daughter Nandita. He died on 4 February 1999 in Cleveland, United States at age of 64, following a heart transplant on 10 January. Even after his death, his contribution to the society was noted as the managing trustee of the Bharatiya Jnanpith, which is a leading organisation devoted to the promotion and recognition of the best creative writing in Indian languages.

== See also ==
- Agrawal and Agrawal Jain
- Nattal Sahu
