= Rais Anis Sabri =

Indian musician (born 1993)

- Born: Rais Anees Sabri; 25 September 1993 (age 33); Jalalabad, Uttar Pradesh, India
- Occupations: Qawwal; Singer
- Years active: 2000 - Present
- Website: raisanissabri.com

Rais Anis Sabri from Najibabad, Uttar Pradesh, India is one of the youngest performing Sufiana Qawwals. He is the son and disciple of Rais Sabri, who in turn is a disciple of the famous Qawwal Aslam Sabri.

Rais Anis Sabri started learning the intricacies of Sufi Qawwali from the age of four and gave his first performance at seven.

He sings mainly in the Chisti Rang, of the Khwaja Moinuddin Chisti of Ajmer, India, following the tradition of Sufi saint Nizamuddin and Amir Khusro, the 13th century Sufi poet. At the age of 12, he gave a performance in the Amir Khusro Sangeet Academy and Friends of Dakshinchitra, in Chennai.

== Personal life ==
Rais Anis Sabri was born on 25 September 1993 at Jalalabad (Najibabad), Uttar Pradesh in Dist. Bijnor. He began to learn the intricacies of this genre of performing arts from his father, Rais Sabri at the age of four and at six gave his first performance. He has several CDs to his credit and one of his albums ‘Chisti Rang’ His YouTube channel has amassed over 15 million total views.

== Musical journey ==
Initially, Rais performed along with his father only but at later stage he started performing solo. In 2003, Rais collaborated with Sonic Enterprises and has given 35 Hit Music Albums. His performance was held at the Music Academy in Chennai on October 26, 2007. The event was organized by Amir Khusro Sangeet Academy, a nonprofit registered trust given to promoting Hindustani classical and related genres in the city. .

Rais has performed abroad, including Johannesburg and Lenasia.

== Awards and recognition ==
- 2006 Awarded from Karnataka Urdu Academy, Bangalore, Karnataka
- 2007 Awarded from Amir Khusro Sangeet Academy, Chennai
