= Najibabad Fort =

Historical Fort in Najibabad Uttar Pradesh, India

- Part of Rohilkhand
- Najibabad, Uttar Pradesh
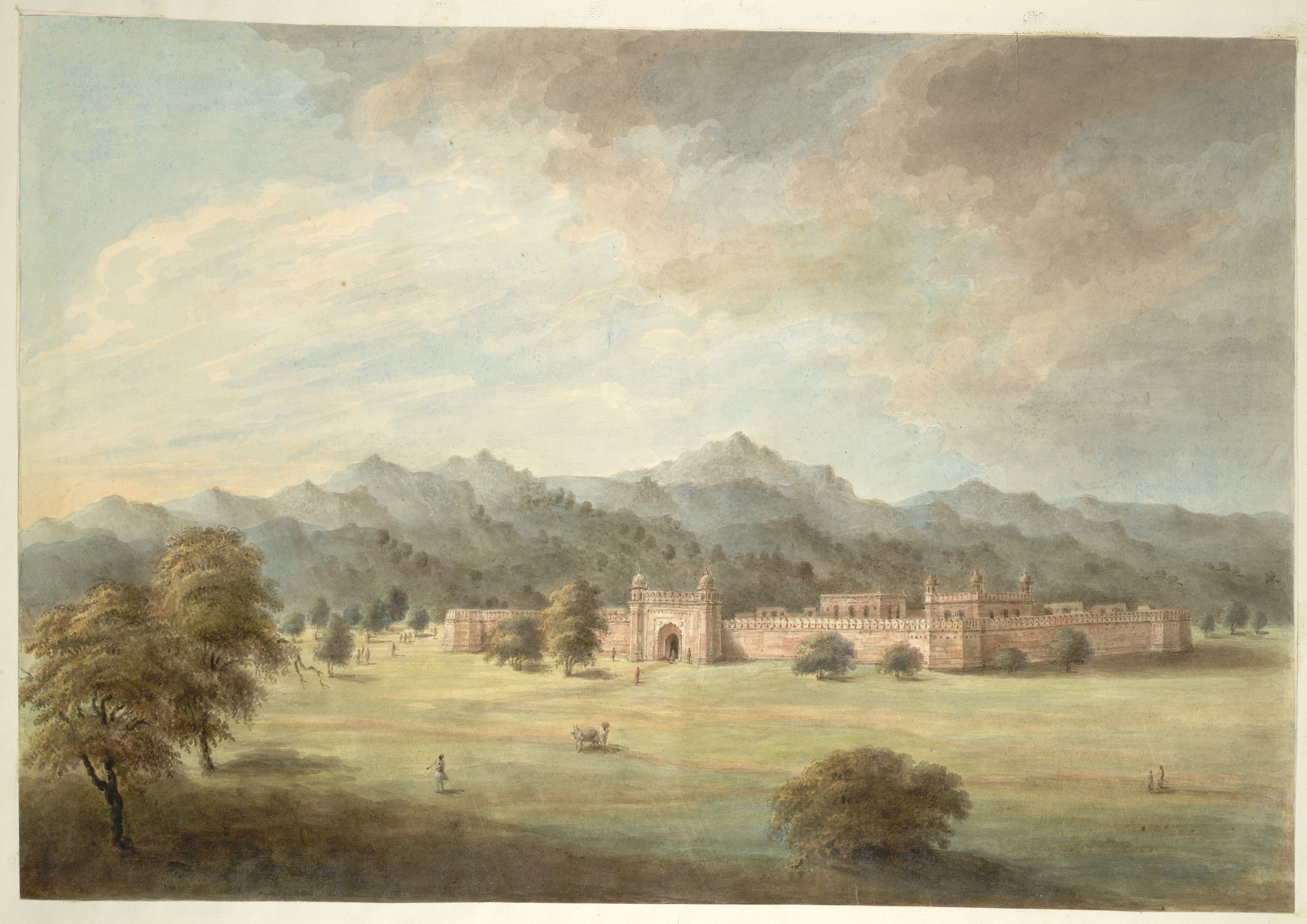
- Najibabad Fort in 1814

Site information
- Type: Fort
- Owner: Government of India; Archaeological Survey of India
- Open to the public: 10 am to 6 pm
- Condition: Good

Location
- Shown within Uttar Pradesh
- Coordinates: 29°36′40″N 78°22′07″E
- Height: 12 m (40 ft)

Site history
- Built: 1755; 270–271 years ago
- Built by: Najib ad-Dawlah
- Materials: Stone, lime and lead
- Battles/wars: Siege of Najibabad (1800)

Garrison information
- Occupants: Mughal Empire, British Raj

Monument of National Importance
- Official name: Najibabad Fort
- Reference no.: N-UP-A113

Najibabad Fort, also known as Sultana Daku Qila and Pathargarh Fort, is an 18th-century fort in Najibabad, Bijnor district, Uttar Pradesh, India. It was built in 1755 by the Mughal minister Najib ad-Dawlah.

No longer in active military use, the former fort is a Monument of National Importance, administered by the Archaeological Survey of India.

== See also ==
- Forts in India
- List of forts in India
- List of Monuments of National Importance in Agra circle
