= Dalmia Dharamsala =

Dalmia Dharmasala
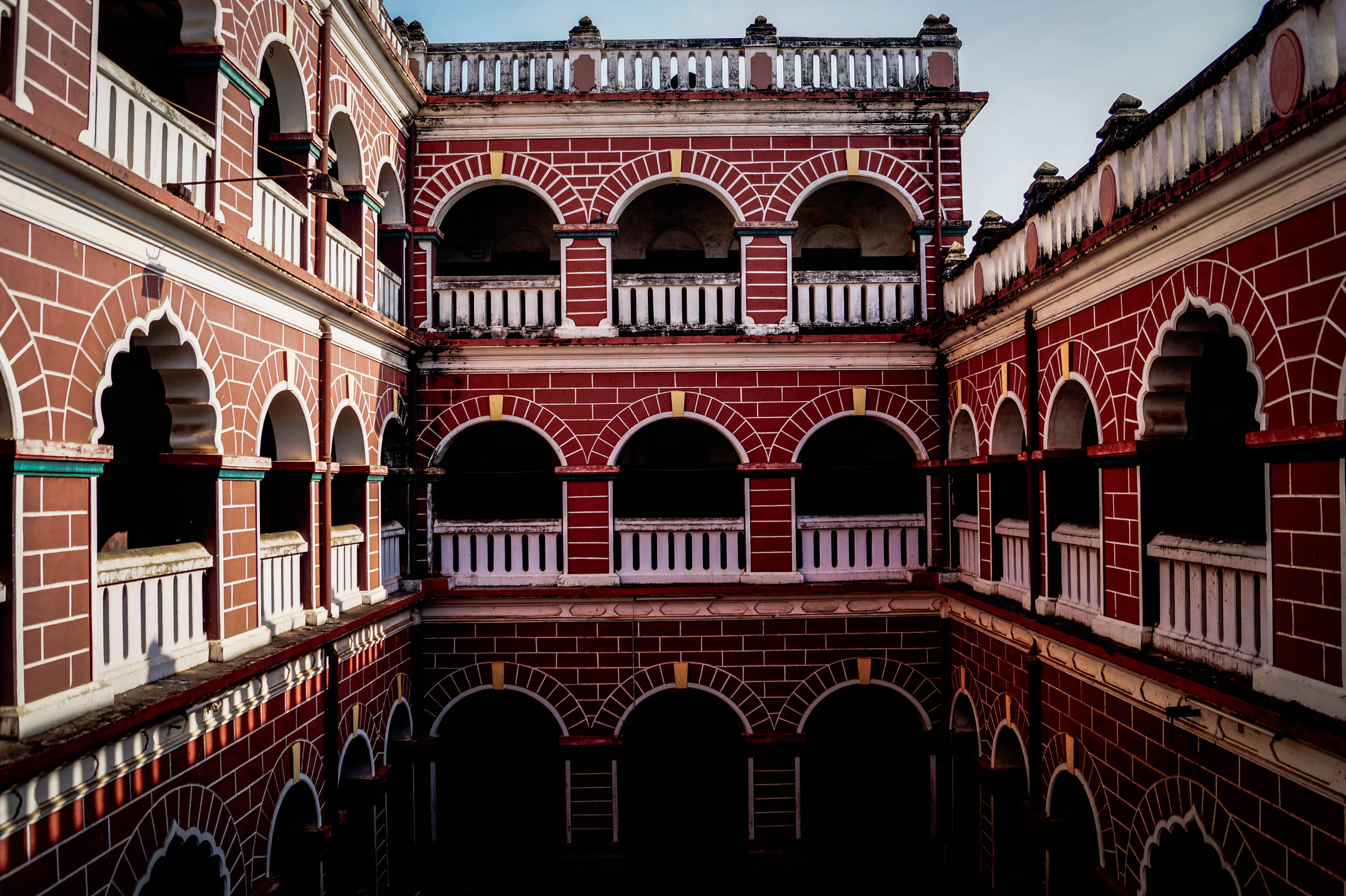

- Location in Orissa

Religion
- Affiliation: Hinduism

Location
- Location: Bhubaneswar
- State: Odisha
- Country: India
- Interactive map of Dalmia Dharmasala
- Coordinates: 20°14′44″N 85°50′04″E

Architecture
- Completed: 1920 AD
- Elevation: 18 m (59 ft)

Dalmiya Dharmasala is a rest house for pilgrims in Bhubaneswar, Odisha, India.

The three-storey building serves as a temporary stay for visitors and pilgrims. The foundation stone dates the dharmasala back to 1920 A.D. and was commissioned by Rai Bahadur Sedmull Dalmia under the name Rai Bahadur Sedmull Dalmia Dharmasala. At present, the dharmasala is maintained by a board of trustees. Situated in the Tala Bazar Chowk across the road in the eastern embankment of Bindusagar Tank, Old Town, Bhubaneswar, this private property is surrounded by a paddy field in the east, the Bindusagar tank in the west across the road at a distance of 5.00 metres, private residential buildings in the north and the Doodwawalla Dharmasala in the south. The Dharmasala can be approached on the left side of the Talabazar road branching from Kedara-Gouri Chowk to the Lingaraja temple.
