= Sahu Shanti Prasad Jain =

Indian businessman (1911–1977)

- Born: 22 May 1911; Najibabad
- Died: 27 October 1977 (aged 66)
- Occupations: Industrialist and Philanthropist
- Years active: 1944–1977
- Spouse: RamaRani Jain
- Children: Ashok Kumar Jain; Alok Jain; Manoj Jain; Alka Jain
- Family: Shreyans Prasad Jain; Sahu Ramesh Chandra Jain

Sahu Shanti Prasad Jain was an Indian industrialist and philanthropist. He was the son-in-law of Ramkrishna Dalmia and former chairman of Bennett, Coleman. His family, Sahu Jains, owns the Times of India newspaper group.

== Early age and education ==
He was born in the Sahu Jain Family at Najibabad in what is now Uttar Pradesh on 22 May 1911.

== Career ==
He founded Bharatiya Jnanpith on 18 February 1944 at the suggestion of many scholars who had gathered at Varanasi for the All India Oriental Conference. Since 1965 Bharatiya Jnanpith has been awarding an annual literary award, the Jnanpith Award, for the best creative Indian literary work of a specified period.

=== Bennett Coleman ===
In 1947, Ramkrishna Dalmia engineered the acquisition of Bennett, Coleman by transferring moneys from a bank and an insurance company of which he was the Chairman. In 1955, this came to the attention of the socialist parliamentarian Feroze Gandhi who was part of the ruling Congress party headed by his estranged father-in-law Jawaharlal Nehru. In December 1955, he raised the matter in parliament, documenting extensively the various fund transfers and intermediaries through which the acquisition had been financed. The case was investigated by the Vivian Bose Commission of Inquiry.

In the court case that followed, where Dalmia was represented by the leading British attorney Sir Dingle Mackintosh Foot, he was sentenced to two years in Tihar Jail. Upon his release, Ramkrishna approached his son-in-law Sahu Shanti Prasad Jain to whom he had entrusted running of Bennett, Coleman & Co. Ltd for taking back the command. But Sahu rebuffed Ramkrishna's efforts to resume command of the company.

== FERA violation charges ==
During Nehru's regime, the trade with other countries and the foreign currencies were strictly regulated. Jain was caught, and subsequently arrested, at Palam airport (in latter day Delhi) for bringing in foreign currency. The event was blacked out by the Times of India, even though other newspapers carried the story.

== Legacy ==
He died on 27 October 1977, two years after the death of his wife. His work was continued by his brother Shreyans Prasad Jain and his son Ashok Kumar Jain. Today, the Times Group that runs Bennett, Coleman & Co. Ltd. is a large media empire, and is managed by his descendants.

== See also ==
- Nattal Sahu
- White Collar Crime
