= Najib ad-Dawlah =

Afghan Rohilla Chief and Mughal serviceman (1707/1708–1770)

Najib-ud-Daula
- Nawab; Mir Bakhshi; Mukhtar Khas "Excellence of the State" "Noble one of the State"
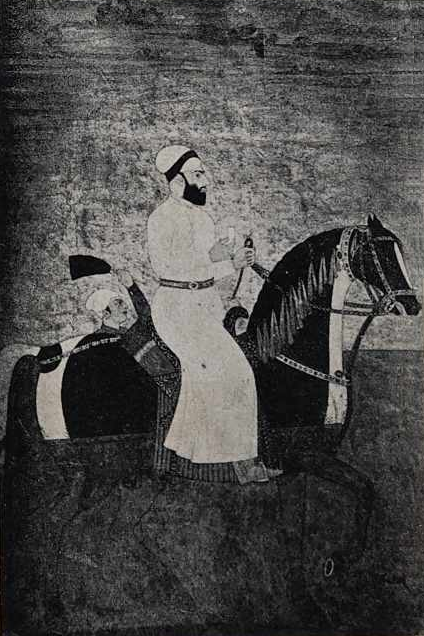
- Equestrian painting of Nawab Najib-ud-Daula, circa 18th century

Commander-in-Chief of The Mughal Empire
- Office holding: 1756 – 1759
- Successor: Mirza Najaf Khan
- Padishah: Alamgir II
- Years active: 1743–1770
- Born: c. 1707–1708; Nazaŕ Khēl, Kabul Subah (present-day Swabi District, Khyber Pakhtunkhwa)
- Died: 30 October 1770
- Children: Zabita Khan
- Military career
- Allegiance: Mughal Empire (Mir Bakhshi of Alamgir II); Mughal Empire (in service of Shah Alam II); Durrani Empire
- Branch: Mughal Army; Kingdom of Rohilkhand
- Rank: Ispahsalar, Plenipotentiary
- Conflicts: Mughal-Maratha Wars; Third Battle of Panipat; Capture of Agra Fort; Battle of Delhi (1764)

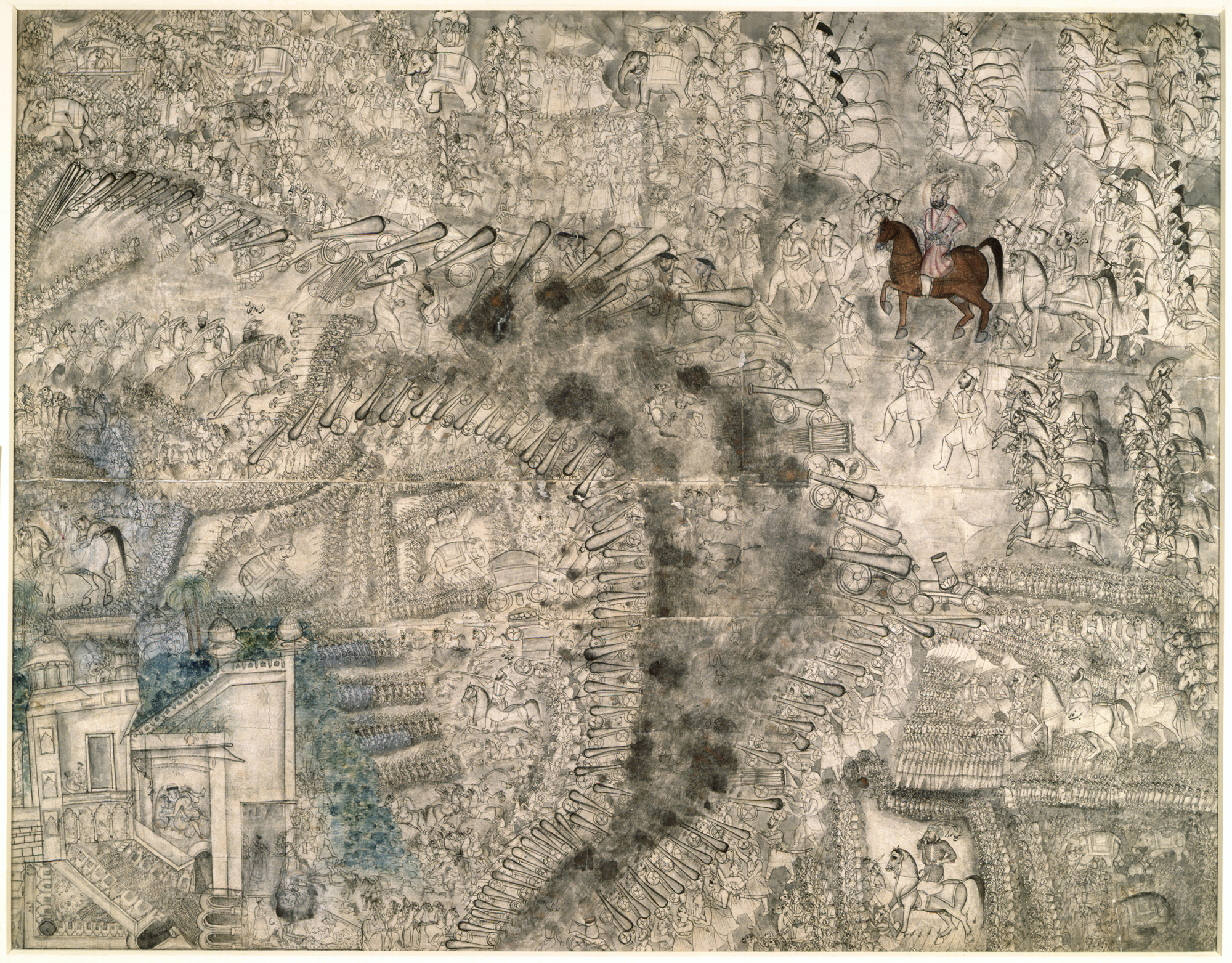
The Third Battle of Panipat, 13 January 1761, Najib ad-Dawlah and Shuja-ud-Daula, standing left to Ahmad Shah Durrani, shown on a brown horse, inflicting the largest number of fatalities in a single day reported in a classic formation battle between two armies.

Najib ad-Dawlah (Pashto: نجيب الدوله; c. 1707–1708 – 30 October 1770), also known as Najib Khan Yousafzai (Pashto: نجيب خان), was an Afghan Yousafzai Rohilla who earlier served as a Mughal serviceman but later deserted the cause of the Mughals and joined Ahmad Shah Abdali in 1757 in his attack on Delhi. He was also a House Chief of Rohilkhand, and in the 1740s founded the city of Najibabad in Bijnor, India. He was instrumental in winning the Third Battle of Panipat and has been regarded as one of the greatest generals of India in the 18th century.

He began his career in 1743 as an immigrant from Nazar Khel, Swabi (of the Umarkhel subbranch of Mandanr Yousafzais) as a soldier. He was an employee of Imad-ul-Mulk but got alerte from going influence of Marhattas and by advise of Shah Waliullah, he invited Ahmad Shah Abdali in 1757 to attack on Delhi and secure the Muslims place in India. He was then appointed as Mir Bakhshi of the Mughal emperor by Abdali. Later in his career he was known as Najib ad-Dawlah, Amir al-Umra, Shuja ad-Dawlah. From 1757 to 1770, he was governor of Saharanpur, ruling over Dehradun. Many architectural relics of the period of Rohilla, the remains in Najibabad, were overseen by him, which he founded at the height of his career as a Mughal minister.

== Biography ==
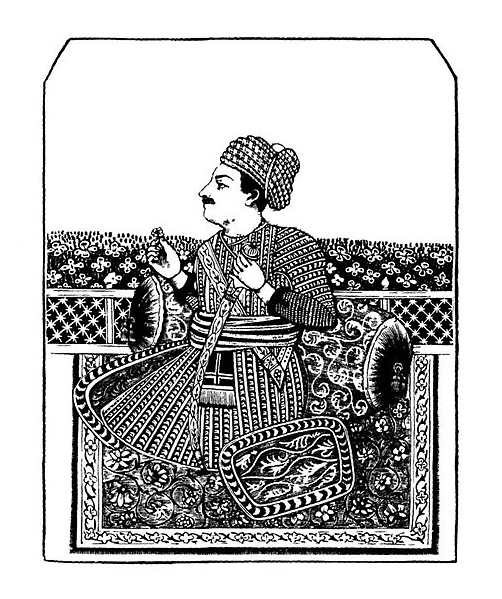
Depiction of Najib ad-Dawlah, from Itihāsa Saṁgraha (1908) by Dattatraya Balavant Parasanis

Najib Khan belonged to the Umar Khel section of the Mandanr Yousafzai. He migrated from Nazar Khel village Swabi, now in the Swabi district of the Khyber Pakhtunkhwa province of Pakistan. His father was Asalat Khan. He migrated in 1739 to join his uncle Bisharat Khan, who had settled with his families of Pakhtuns at Bisharatnagar, near Rampur. In 1749, Ali Mohammed Khan, who had captured most of Rohilkhand by 1740, gave Najib Khan a northern portion, where he established the present day town of Najibabad, a state of Najibabad independent from other Rohilla tribes, and received the title, ‘Najib-ud-Daula’.

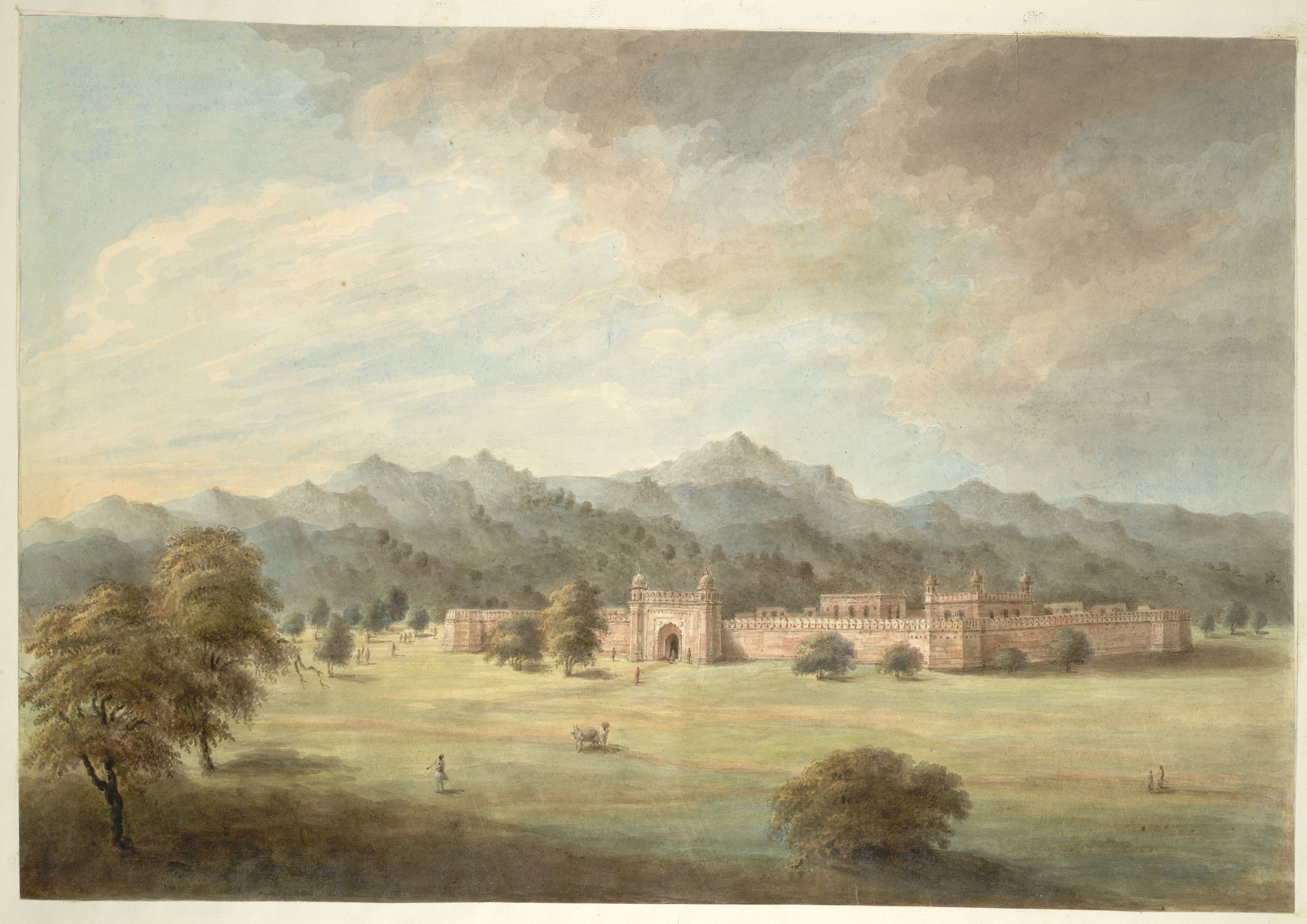
Patthargarh fort outside Najibabad, built by Najib ad-Dawlah in 1755. 1814-15 painting.

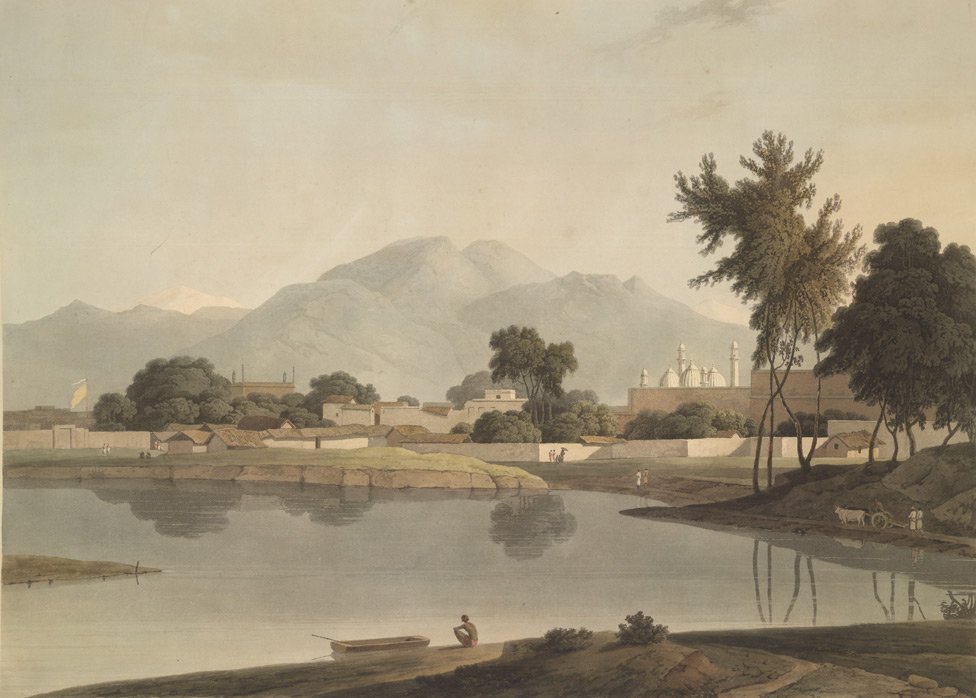
Najibabad, c. 1784–94, the triple-domed Jami Mosque and the entrance gate to the Rohilla palace

Imad-ul-Mulk appointed Najib ad-Dawlah as the governor of Saharanpur. In 1757, Najib ad-Dawlah, who was then the governor of Saharanpur under Mughal Empire, invaded the city of Dehradun, with his army of Rohillas, and ruled the area for the next decade. His rule was known for its administration, and development of land resources, leading to widespread development and prosperity in the area, with emphasis on agriculture and irrigation. Many mango groves in the region created during the era still exist today.

== Conflict against the Marathas ==
=== Battle of Delhi (1757) ===
Ahmad Shah Abdali's invasion of 1757 left Najib in effective control of Delhi who was appointed to the post of Mir Bakhshi. He had become the de facto ruler of Delhi, while the Mughal emperor was left with no actual power. Najib's religious precept, Mian Qutb Shah, who was not a Rohilla by caste and was the ruler of Saharanpur, was in charge of the defence of the Red Fort of Delhi from the Marathas, while Najib commanded the artillery to stop the entry of the Marathas into the city. His forces had to clash with the advancing Marathas in Delhi in the Battle of Delhi (1757). Delhi was captured by Marathas and he was allowed safe exit from Delhi.

=== Third Battle of Panipat ===
In the Third Battle of Panipat, during the Maratha conquests, he allied himself with the Durrani Empire led by Ahmad Shah Durrani (also known as Ahmad Shah Abdali, against the Marathas. Najib Khan was clever enough to understand the changed realities after Panipat. His brilliant political acumen was used by Ahmad Shah Abdali to isolate Marathas & preventing them from getting even single ally during their conflict with Durrani's power. His refusal to sign treaty with Marathas, was the main cause of battle at Panipat. He provided, Ahmad Shah Durrani, with 40,000 Rohilla troops and 70 guns to the combined forces. He also convinced Shuja-ud-Daula, the Nawab of Oudh, to join Ahmad Shah Abdali's forces against the Marathas. In this battle, the Maratha's were defeated and as a consequence the Rohilla increased in power. Marathas had some recovery after 10 years and under Mahadji Schinde had recaptured Delhi in 1771, reinstalling the weakened Mughal Emperor Shah Alam II to the throne, under Maratha suzerainty.

After the war, he was made Mir Bakshi of Mughal emperor. He had to become ruler of Delhi state with empty treasury & territory confining to boundaries of Delhi city.

Najib Khan was a Pashtun soldier of fortune; he attained the hand of the daughter of Dunde Khan Barech, one of the chieftains of the Rohilkhand Pathans. Rewarded by this ruler with the charge of a district, now Bijnor, in the North-west corner of Rohilkhand, he had joined the cause of Safdarjung, when that minister occupied the country; but on the latter's disgrace had borne a part in the campaigns of Ghazi-ud-din. When the Vizier first conceived the project of attacking the government, he sent Najib in the command of a Mughal detachment to occupy the country, about Saharanpur, then known as the Bawani Mahal, which had formed the jagir of the Ex-Vazir Khan Khanan.

This territory thus became in its turn separated from the Empire and continued for two generations in the family of Najib. He ruled the dwindled Empire for nine years, and died a peaceful death, leaving his charge in an improved and strengthened condition, ready for its lawful monarch.

== Administrator of Delhi ==
Najib had much to do with the return of Mughal power in India after Panipat; note: the territories of those loyal to the Great Mogul in (Green).

As the Administrator of Delhi and the imperial heartlands including Agra, Najib ad-Dawlah, was unsuccessful in halting the Jat uprisings led by Raja Suraj Mal. During one massive assault, the Jats and their leaders overran the Mughal garrison at Agra, plundering the city and looting the two silver gates to the entrance of the famous Taj Mahal in 1764.

== Death ==
After protecting Rohilkhand, Delhi and Agra for nearly ten years as regent of the Mughal Empire, he fell ill and died on 30 October 1770.

== Successor ==
After his death he was succeeded by his son Zabita Khan. Zabita Khan's step-brother, Kallu Khan was born from the daughter of Dundi Khan and Najib Khan. His cemetery is still in present-day Najibabad, where the Pathargarh Fort still exists.

== Desecration of his tomb ==
His son Zabita Khan was defeated by a Mughal-Maratha force, led by Mahadji Sindhia (Shinde) ordered by Emperor Shah Alam II in 1772 and the fort of Pathargarh was completely looted of horses, elephants, guns and other valuable things by the Marathas. Marathas are also claimed to have destroyed the grave of Najib and scattered his bones. Jadunath Sarkar notes that the fancy workmanship of the tomb was defaced, but the grave was never demolished.

A few years later, in the subsequent Rohilla War, the Rohillas were attacked by Awadh with help from British East India Company forces. When Hafiz Rahmat Khan Barech was killed in battle in April 1774, they were defeated, and Rohilkhand was plundered; and later, the Rohilla power east of the Ganges was ended, and the final treaty by which the territory was incorporated in Awadh was concluded at Lal Dhang. The district was ceded to the British by the Nawab of Awadh, Saadat Ali Khan II in 1801.

== In popular culture ==
- In the 1994 Hindi TV series The Great Maratha, Najib's character was portrayed by Irrfan Khan.
- In the 2019 Bollywood film Panipat, Najib, portrayed by Mantra, appears as one of the primary antagonists.

== See also ==
- Mughal Empire
- Shah Alam II
- Ahmad Shah Durrani
