= Sanjay Dalmia =

Indian businessman

- Born: 1944 (age 81–82); Lahore, British India
- Education: Delhi University
- Occupation: Chairman Dalmia Group of Companies
- Organization: Dalmia Group
- Website: sanjaydalmia.in

Sanjay Dalmia (born in 1944) is an Indian businessman. He is the chairman of the Dalmia Group of Companies, a Delhi-based global business conglomerate and continues to head its charitable trusts. Dalmia is associated with trade organizations including the PHD Chamber of Commerce and FICCI (Federation of Indian Chambers of Commerce and Industry). He has also been on the board of directors of Union Bank of India, a Member of the Northern Committee of IDBI (Industrial Development Bank of India). Dalmia is also a founder director of the "Europe-India Chamber of Commerce" (EICC) with headquarters in Brussels, which was formed with the aim of promoting trade, commerce and investments between India and Europe.

== Early life ==
Dalmia is the son of Vishnu Hari Dalmia.He belongs to Bania community. He was schooled in Delhi, at the Modern School for secondary education. He graduated with Economics (Hons) from St. Stephen's College, Delhi University.

== Career ==
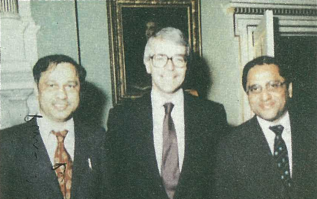
Dalmia with Dnyaneshwar Agashe and John Major.

Dalmia began his career as an industrialist in the early 1970s, with Dalmia Brothers Pvt Ltd, the reign of which he took on from his father, Vishnu Hari Dalmia. Dalmia has also been the Non-Executive Chairman of GHCL Limited (Former Name, Gujarat Heavy Chemicals Limited) since January 2005. He has been a Director at GHCL since 20 October 1983. He serves as Chairman of Colwell and Salmon Communications (India) Ltd., a subsidiary of GHCL Ltd.

Dalmia served as the Chairman of Golden Tobacco Ltd. until 10 February 2014. He serves as a Director of Bharat Explosives Ltd.

Dalmia served as a Member of Rajya Sabha where he was involved in debates and discussions around national issues related to finance, economy and the industries of India. He moved a private members bill in the Rajya Sabha for renaming the Andaman Nicobar Islands as "Saheed and Swaraj Islands" as a tribute to Subhash Chandra Bose and the freedom fighters.

=== Humanitarian efforts ===
Dalmia is a patron of the Dalmia Sewa Trust, which is involved in the construction of lavatories in about 100 houses, and building houses for about 100 homeless families in Chirawa, Rajasthan. The foundation has organized a Free Health Checkup, which was inaugurated by Dalmia in Agrasen Bhawan. He instituted Masoom – a school for special children, which aims to aid underprivileged children.
