= Samir Jain =

Indian businessman (born 1954)

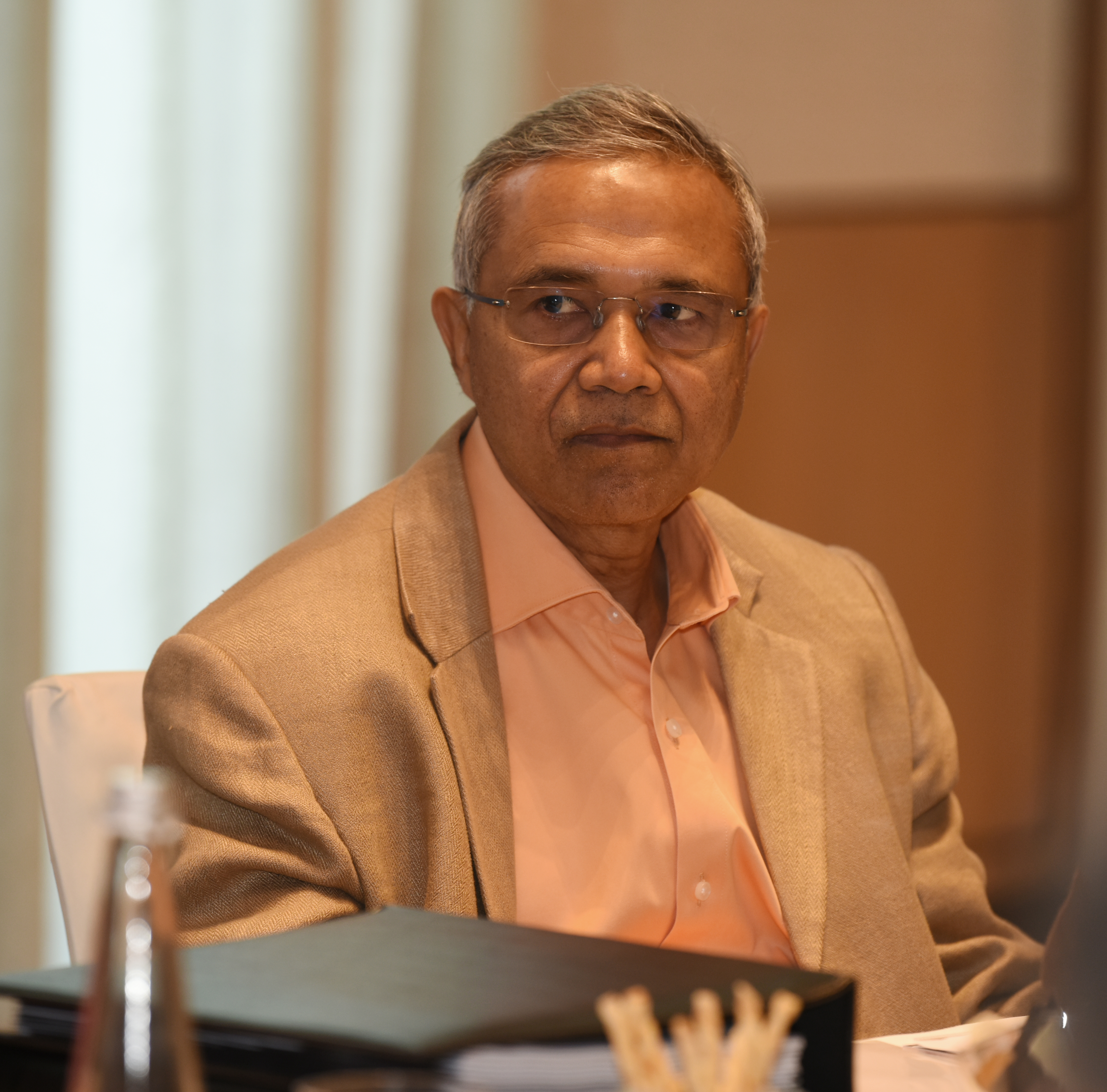
- Samir Jain in 2019
- Born: 11 March 1954 (age 72); New Delhi, India
- Occupations: Publisher; businessman
- Years active: 1980–present
- Known for: Architect of The Times Group; Media and Advertising Mogul
- Title: Vice-Chairman and Managing Director of The Times Group
- Spouse: Meera Jain
- Children: Trishla Jain (daughter); Satyan Gajwani (son-in-law)

Samir Jain (born 11 March 1954) is an Indian publisher and the vice-chairman and managing director (VCMD) of Bennett, Coleman & Co. Ltd., also known as The Times Group, a leading media conglomerate with its primary base of operations in India, which publishes The Times of India and has many other interests. Jain belongs to the Sahu Jain family, an industrialist family of India.

== Career ==
In 1975, Samir joined Bennett, Coleman & Co. Ltd. During his time, The Times of India has become the largest circulating English newspaper in the world.
