= Bharatiya Jnanpith =

Literary and research organization

- Formation: 18 February 1944; 82 years ago
- Founder: Sahu Shanti Prasad Jain
- Headquarters: 18 Institutional Area, Lodhi Road, New Delhi 110 003, India
- Location: New Delhi, India
- Region served: India
- Website: jnanpith.net

Bharatiya Jnanpith a literary and research organisation, based in New Delhi, India, was founded on February 18, 1944 by Sahu Shanti Prasad Jain of the Sahu Jain family and his wife Rama Jain to undertake systematic research and publication of Sanskrit, Prakrit, Pali and Apabhramsha texts and covering subjects like religion, philosophy, logic, ethics, grammar, astrology, poetics, etc.

Its research and publication programme started with the publication of the Dhavala texts. A Jain temple at Moodabidri in Karnataka, southern India, had stored for centuries its manuscript of palm-leaves. It was a 9th-century commentary in Prakrit and Sanskrit, of a 2nd-century CE work, Satkhandagama, in Prakrit on the Jain doctrine of karma.

It has published two series of texts:

1. Moortidevi Granthmala
2. Lokodaya Granthmala

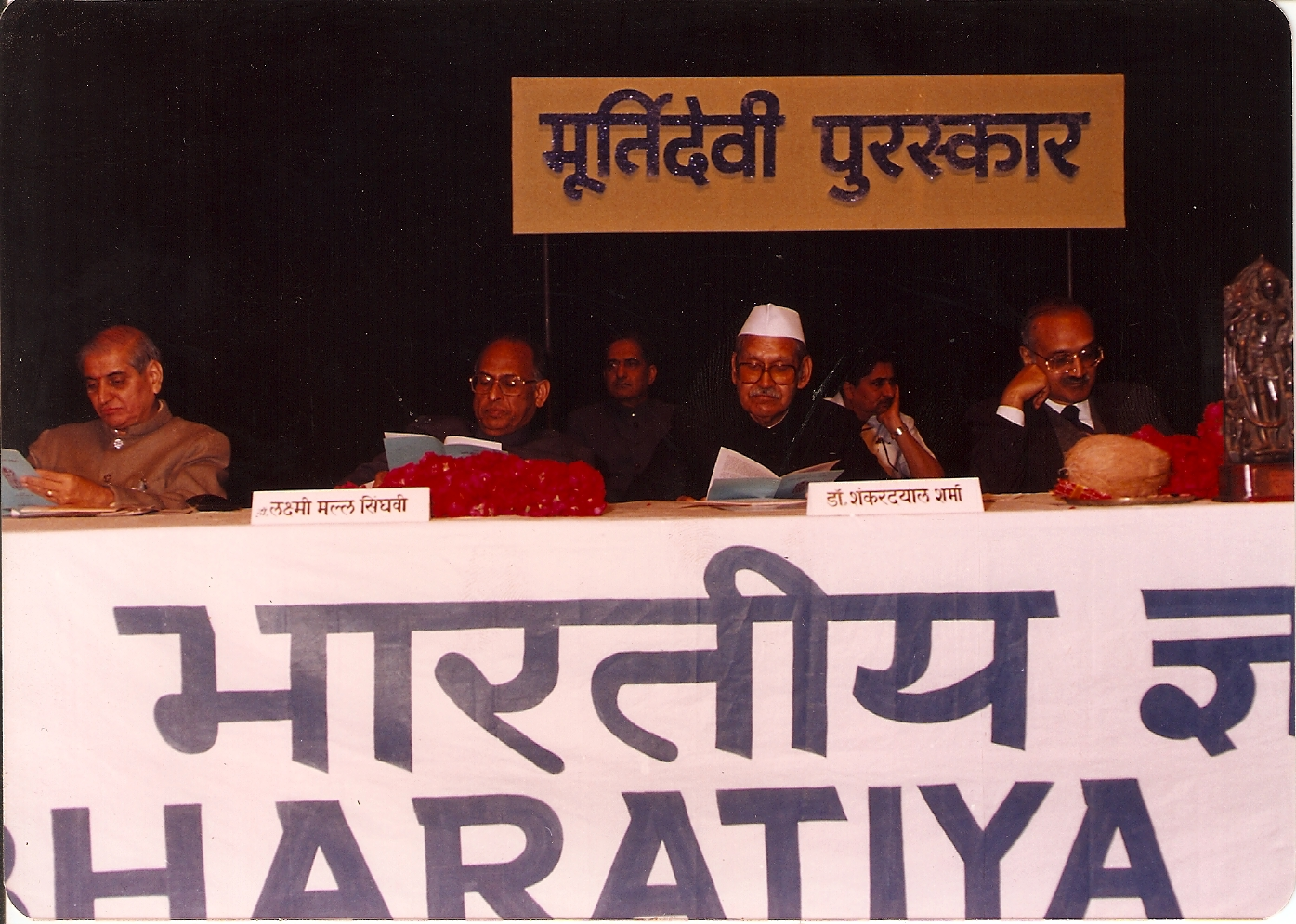
Moortidevi Award function

It annually publishes hundreds of books in Hindi (both original and translated works) and other languages, and also presents India's highest literary awards, the Jnanpith Awards and the Moortidevi Award.

== See also ==
- Manipuri Sahitya Parishad
- Sahitya Akademi
