= Najibabad =

- Town
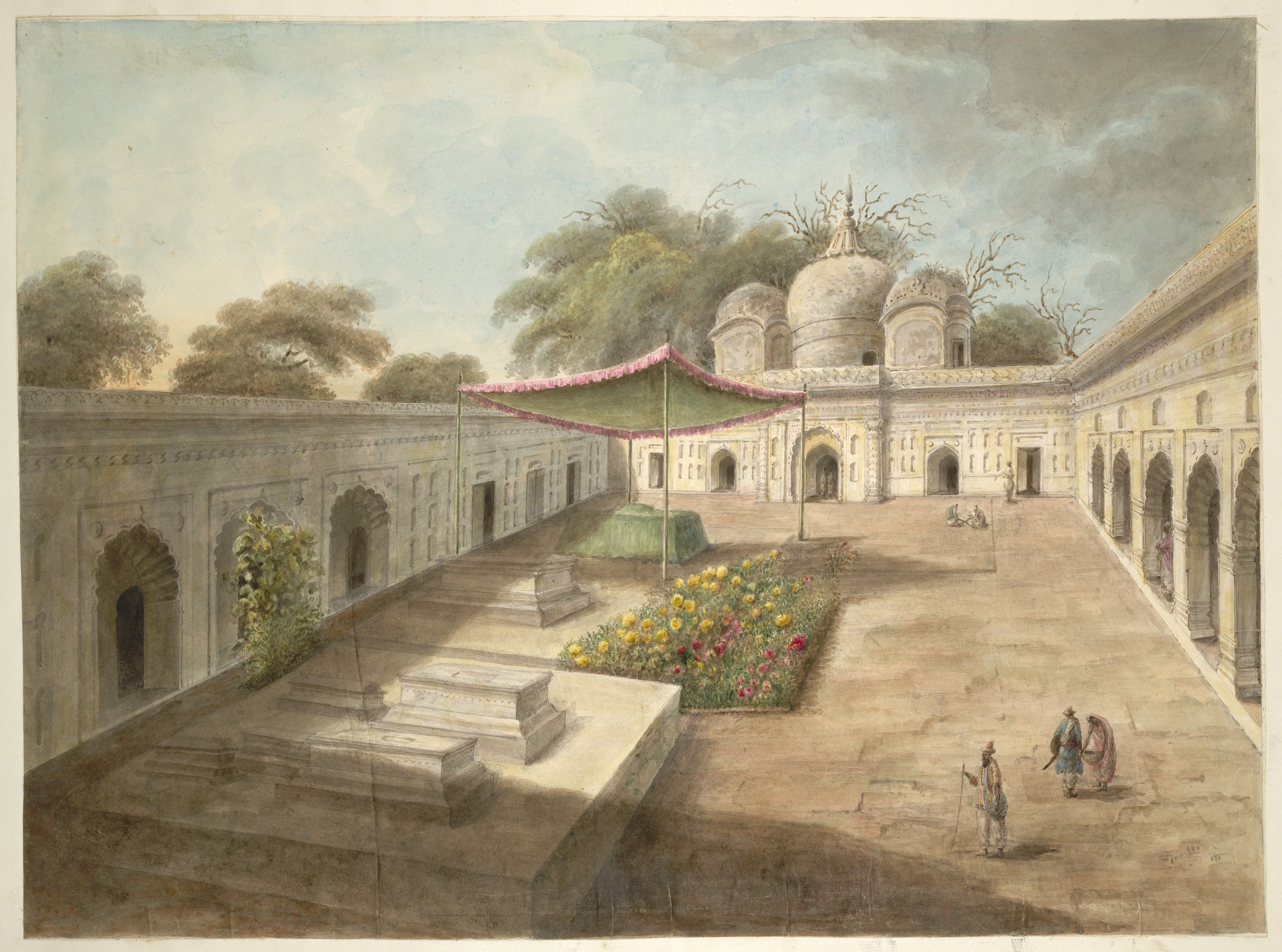
- A mosque and a shrine in its courtyard
- Nickname: Najibnagar
- Location in Uttar Pradesh, India Najibabad (India)
- Coordinates: 29°36′46″N 78°20′33″E
- Country: India
- State: Uttar Pradesh
- District: Bijnor
- Founder: Najib-ud-Daulah

Government
  - Type: MLA: Tasleem (SP); Municipality Chairman: Muazzam Ahmad Khan aka "Engineer Muazzam"
  - Rank: 271
- Elevation: 315 m (1,033 ft)

Population (2011)
  - Total: 88,535

Language
  - Official: Hindi
  - Additional official: Urdu
- Time zone: UTC+5:30 (IST)
- PIN: 246763
- Telephone code: 01341
- Vehicle registration: UP-20

Najibabad is a town in the Bijnor district of the Indian state of Uttar Pradesh, located near the city of Bijnor. It is a major industrial centre and has national transport links via rail and roadways such as NH 119 and NH 74.

== History ==
Nawab Najib-ud-Daula, also known as Najib Khan Yousafzai, was a noted Rohilla Muslim warrior and serviceman of both the Mughal Empire and the Durrani Empire in 18th century Rohilkhand. In 1751, he founded the town of Najibabad in Bijnor district, India, after he received the title, "Najib-ud-Daula" from Mughal Emperor Alalmgir III. From 1757 to 1770 he was also the governor of Saharanpur, ruling over Dehradun. Many architectural relics of the period of Rohilla he oversaw remain in Najibabad, which he founded at the height of his career as a Mughal minister. He had succeeded Safdarjung as Grand Wazir of the Mughal Empire and was a devoted serviceman of the Mughal Emperor Alamgir II.

According to George Foster ("A Journey from Bengal to England", 1790):

Najibuddaulah, who built this town, saw that its situation would facilitate the commerce of Kashmir, which having been diverted from its former channel of Lahore and Delhi, by the inroads of Sicques [Sikhs], Maharattas and Afgans, took course through the mountains at the head of the Punjab and was introduced into the Rohilla (country) through the Lall Dong Pass. This inducement, with the desire of establishing a mart for the Hindoos of the adjacent mountains, probably influenced the choice of this spot, which otherwise is not favourable for the site of a capital town being low, and surrounded by swampy grounds…. since the death of its founder, Najibabad had fallen from its former importance and seems now chiefly upheld by the languishing trade of Kashmir.

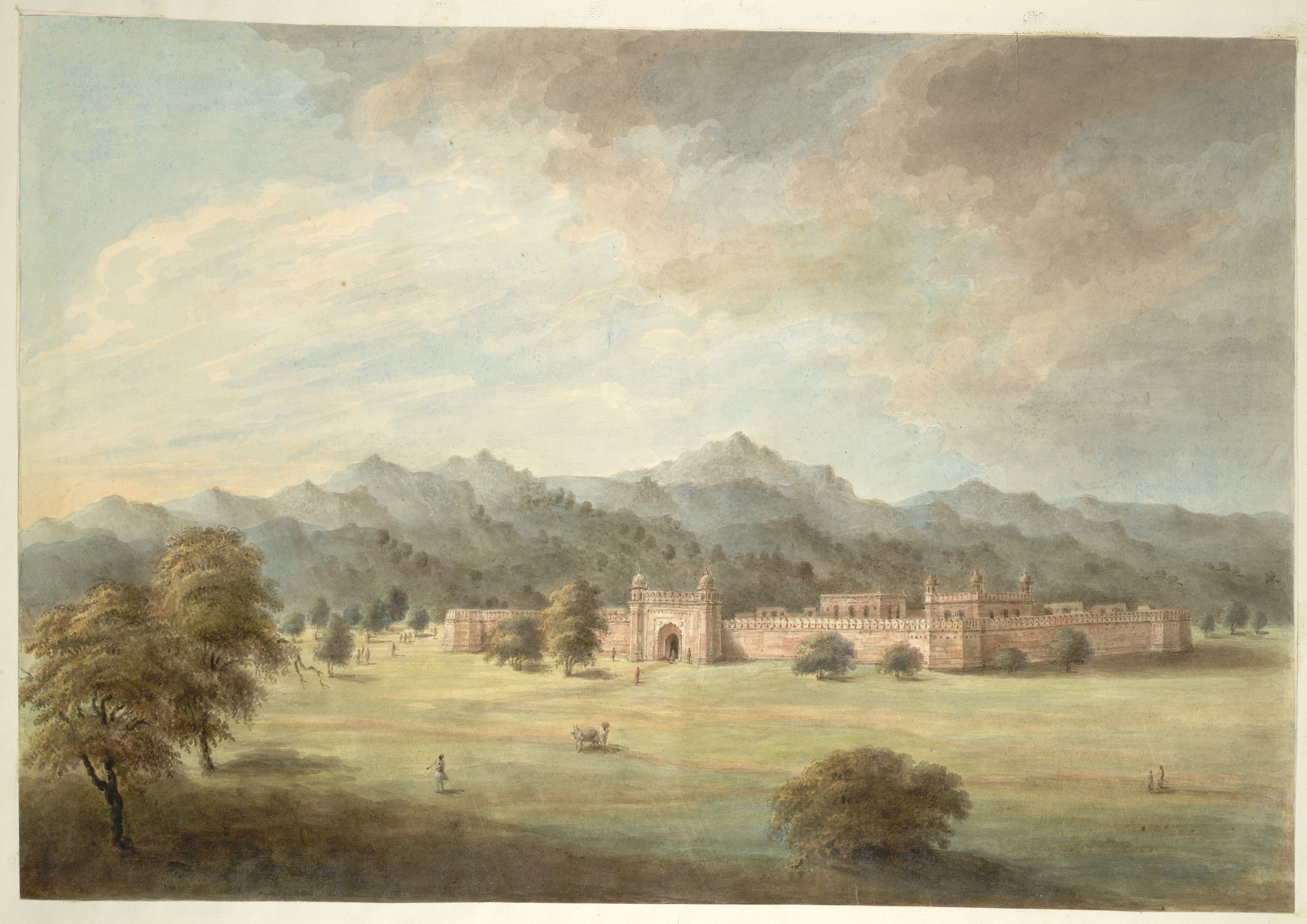
Patthargarh fort also called Najibabad Fort

== Geography ==
Najibabad is located at 29.63°N 78.33°E. It has an average elevation of 295.5 metres (1014 feet).

=== Climate ===
Climate data for Najibabad (1991–2020, extremes 1952–2012)
Month	Jan	Feb	Mar	Apr	May	Jun	Jul	Aug	Sep	Oct	Nov	Dec	Year
Record high °C (°F)	29.9 (85.8)	33.6 (92.5)	39.0 (102.2)	42.7 (108.9)	45.0 (113.0)	45.2 (113.4)	43.0 (109.4)	37.4 (99.3)	36.9 (98.4)	35.7 (96.3)	35.0 (95.0)	30.4 (86.7)	45.2 (113.4)
Mean daily maximum °C (°F)	19.4 (66.9)	23.8 (74.8)	29.0 (84.2)	35.2 (95.4)	37.6 (99.7)	36.5 (97.7)	33.2 (91.8)	32.3 (90.1)	32.3 (90.1)	31.4 (88.5)	27.5 (81.5)	22.4 (72.3)	30.0 (86.0)
Mean daily minimum °C (°F)	6.9 (44.4)	9.6 (49.3)	13.6 (56.5)	18.5 (65.3)	22.4 (72.3)	24.5 (76.1)	24.6 (76.3)	24.2 (75.6)	23.1 (73.6)	18.1 (64.6)	12.4 (54.3)	7.7 (45.9)	17.3 (63.1)
Record low °C (°F)	−2.9 (26.8)	0.8 (33.4)	2.2 (36.0)	9.1 (48.4)	13.1 (55.6)	14.6 (58.3)	14.9 (58.8)	16.9 (62.4)	15.6 (60.1)	9.8 (49.6)	2.2 (36.0)	−1.0 (30.2)	−2.9 (26.8)
Average rainfall mm (inches)	20.2 (0.80)	29.3 (1.15)	16.2 (0.64)	8.4 (0.33)	24.9 (0.98)	94.8 (3.73)	291.8 (11.49)	257.5 (10.14)	159.5 (6.28)	10.0 (0.39)	4.3 (0.17)	9.7 (0.38)	926.6 (36.48)
Average rainy days	1.5	2.0	1.3	0.8	1.8	4.9	9.1	10.1	5.4	0.9	0.4	0.7	38.8
Average relative humidity (%) (at 17:30 IST)	66	54	45	34	36	50	70	75	70	59	60	64	58
Source: India Meteorological Department

== People's representative ==
The current Member of Legislative Assembly (MLA) from Najibabad is Tasleem (Samajwadi Party). The current municipality (nagar palika parishad) chairman is Engineer Muazzam. Najibabad is part of Nagina parliamentary constituency and current Member of Parliament is Chandrashekhar azad

== Forts and monuments ==
Najibabad has four sites protected by the Archaeological Survey of India :

- Tomb of Najib-ud-Daula
- Cemetery of Najib-ud-Daula
- Najibabad Fort, also known as the Pathargarh Fort, built by Najib ad-Dawlah, and also known as 'Sultana Daku Ka Qila'
- Portion of the old Rohilla Palace (called Thanna)

Other historical sites include:

- Jama Masjid Najibabad, also built by Najib ad-Dawlah
- Eidgah Husainpur
- Purana Shiv Mandir, Adarsh Nagar
- Jama Masjid Husainpur
- Baba Nanhe Miya Mazar, Paibagh
- Gurudwara Najibabad
- Char minar Mehdibagh
- Mordhaj, also known as Munawar Jar, with lofty mound called chaar minar

== Industries ==
Najibabad has an All India Radio centre. The town is an important trade centre for timber, sugar and grain. There are manufacturing units which deal with metal, shoes, blankets, shawls and cotton.

Handicrafts

Najibabad has many craftsmen, the most remarkable being the rafoogars or the darners.

== Demographics ==
As of 2011 census of India Najibabad had a total population of 88,535 of which 46,372 are males while 42,163 are females. Population within the age group of 0 – 6 years was 12,697.

=== Religion ===
Religions in Najibabad (2011)
Religion	Percent
Hindus	30%
Muslims	70%

== Notable people ==
- Najib ad-Dawlah
- Akhtar ul Iman
- Sahu Jain family
- Mohammad Ali Jauhar
- Akbar Shah Khan Najibabadi
- Rais Anis Sabri - traditional singer
