= The Times of India =

Indian English-language daily newspaper

- Let the Truth Prevail

- 20 August 2011 front page of The Times of India (Kolkata edition)
- Type: Daily newspaper
- Format: Broadsheet
- Owner: The Times Group
- Editor: Jaideep Bosee
- Founded: 3 November 1838; 188 years ago
- Language: English
- Headquarters: Mumbai, Maharashtra, India
- Country: India
- Circulation: 1,872,442 (as of April 2023)
- Sister newspapers: The Economic Times; Navbharat Times; Maharashtra Times; Ei Samay; Mumbai Mirror; Vijaya Karnataka; Bangalore Mirror; Times Now News
- ISSN: 0971-8257
- OCLC number: 23379369
- Website: timesofindia.indiatimes.com

The Times of India (TOI) is an Indian English-language daily news and digital news media outlet. It is the third-largest newspaper in India by circulation and the ninth-largest selling English-language daily in the world. It is the oldest English-language newspaper in India and the second-oldest Indian newspaper still in circulation, with its first edition published in 1838. It is nicknamed "The Old Lady of Bori Bunder". It is considered a newspaper of record.

Near the beginning of the 20th century, Lord Curzon, the Viceroy of India, called TOI "the leading paper in Asia". In 1991, the BBC ranked TOI among the world's six best newspapers. It is owned and published by Bennett, Coleman & Co. Ltd. (BCCL), which is controlled by the Sahu Jain family. In the Brand Trust Report India study 2019, TOI was rated as the most trusted English newspaper in India. In a 2021 survey, the Reuters Institute for the Study of Journalism rated TOI the most trusted news brand among English-speaking online news users in India. Since the 2000s, the newspaper has also been criticised for establishing the practice of accepting payments in exchange for positive coverage in the Indian news industry.

== History ==
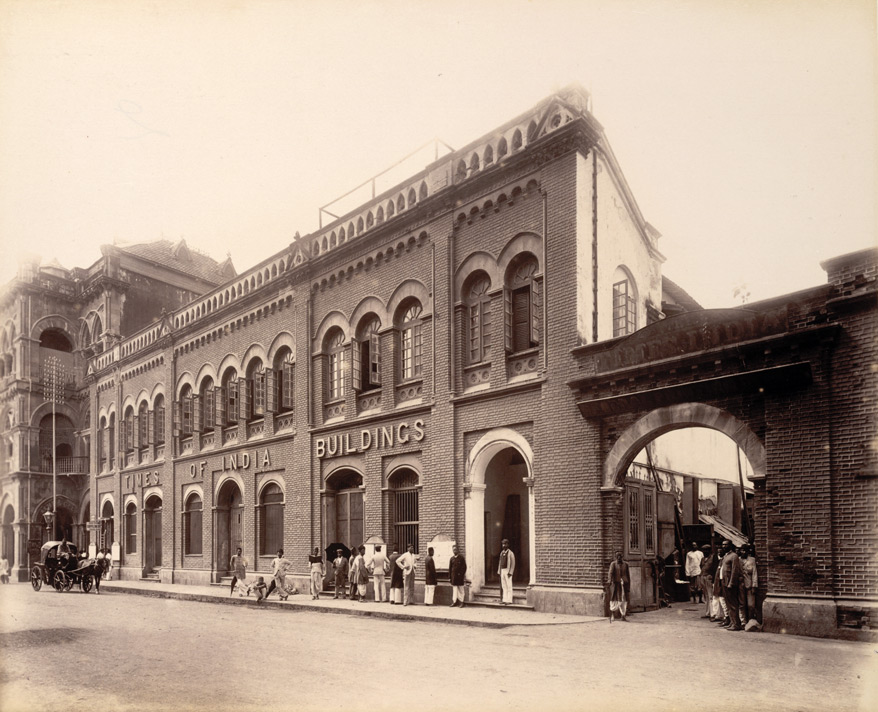
Times of India Buildings, c. 1898

=== 1800s ===
==== Beginnings ====
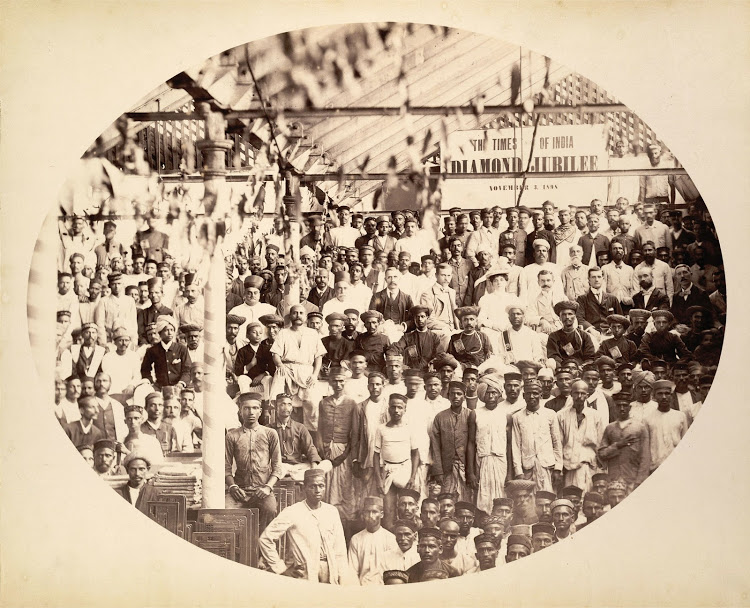
Diamond Jubilee, November 1898

TOI issued its first edition on 3 November 1838 as The Bombay Times and Journal of Commerce. The paper was published on Wednesdays and Saturdays under the direction of Raobahadur Narayan Dinanath Velkar, a Marathi social reformer, and contained news from Britain and the world, as well as the Indian subcontinent. J. E. Brennan was its first editor. He died in 1839, and George Buist became the editor. It became a daily in 1850 under him. George Buist had a pro-British editorial policy, and a Parsi shareholder, Fardoonji Naoroji, wanted him to change it, particularly in the context of the Indian Rebellion of 1857. However, Buist refused to change his editorial policy or give up his editorial independence. After a shareholder's meeting he was replaced by Robert Knight.

In 1860, editor Robert Knight (1825–1892) bought the Indian shareholders' interests, merged with rival Bombay Standard, and started India's first news agency. It wired Times dispatches to papers across the country and became the Indian agent for Reuters news service. In 1861, he changed the name from the Bombay Times and Standard to The Times of India. Knight fought for a press free of prior restraint or intimidation, frequently resisting the attempts by governments, business interests and cultural spokespeople, and led the paper to national prominence. In the 19th century, this newspaper company employed more than 800 people and had a sizeable circulation in India and Europe.

==== Bennett and Coleman ownership ====
Subsequently, TOI saw its ownership change several times until 1892 when an English journalist named Thomas Jewell Bennett, along with Frank Morris Coleman (who later drowned in the 1915 sinking of the SS Persia), acquired the newspaper through their new joint stock company, Bennett, Coleman & Co. Ltd.

=== 1900s ===
==== Dalmia ownership ====
Sir Stanley Reed edited TOI from 1907 until 1924 and received correspondence from major figures of India such as Mahatma Gandhi. In all, he lived in India for fifty years. He was respected in the United Kingdom as an expert on Indian current affairs. Bennett Coleman & Co. Ltd was sold to sugar magnate Ramkrishna Dalmia of the industrial family, for ₹20 million (equivalent to ₹3.1 billion or US$32 million in 2026) in 1946, as India became independent and the British owners left. In 1955, the Vivian Bose Commission of Inquiry found that Dalmia, in 1947, had engineered the acquisition of the media giant Bennett Coleman & Co. by transferring money from a bank and an insurance company of which he was the chairman. In the court case that followed, Dalmia was sentenced to two years in Tihar Jail for embezzlement and fraud. He managed to spend most of the jail term in hospital. Upon his release, his son-in-law, Sahu Shanti Prasad Jain, to whom he had entrusted the running of Bennett, Coleman & Co. Ltd., rebuffed his efforts to resume command of the company.

==== Jain family (Shanti Prasad Jain) ====
In the early 1960s, Shanti Prasad Jain was imprisoned for selling newsprint on the black market. And based on the Vivian Bose Commission's earlier report which found wrongdoings of the Dalmia–Jain group, that included specific charges against Shanti Prasad Jain, the Government of India filed a petition to restrain and remove the management of Bennett, Coleman and Company. Based on the pleading, the judge hearing the petition directed the Government to assume control of the newspaper, which resulted in replacing half of the directors and appointing a Bombay High Court judge as the chairman.

==== Under the government of India ====
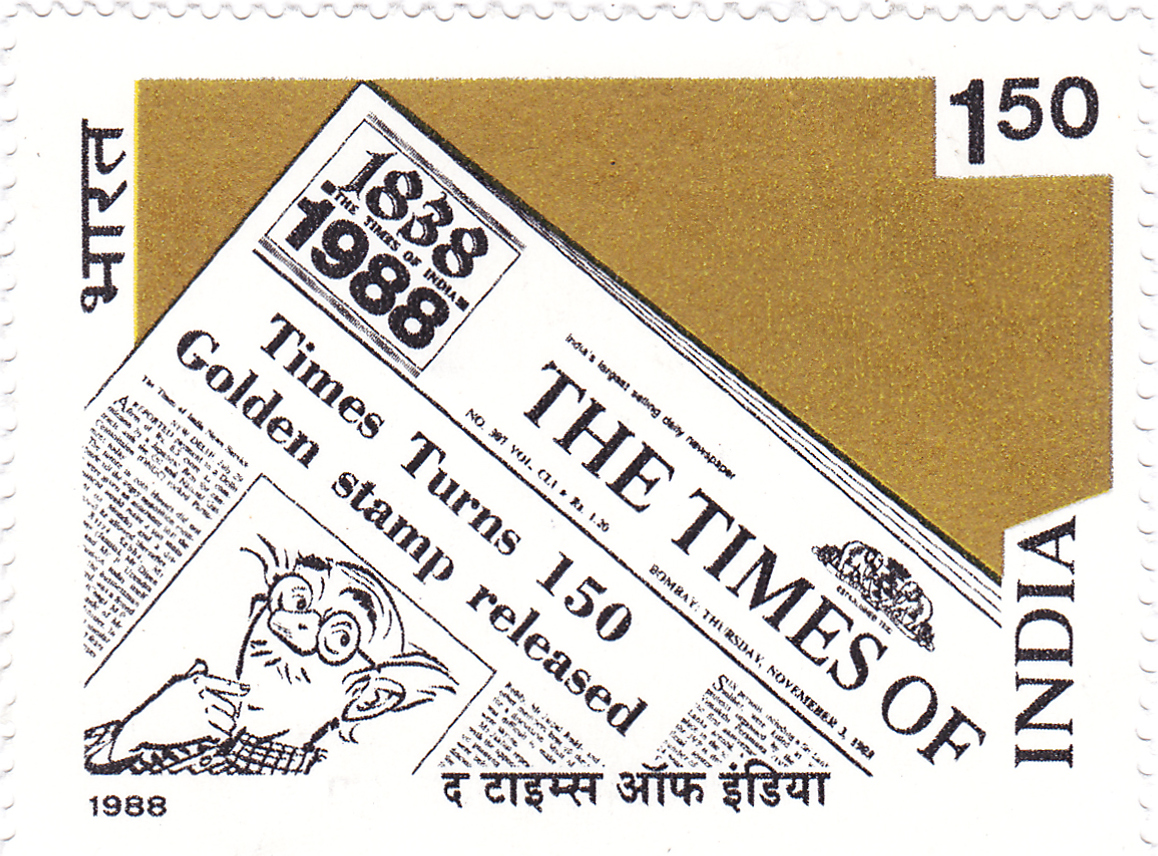
TOI on a 1988 stamp

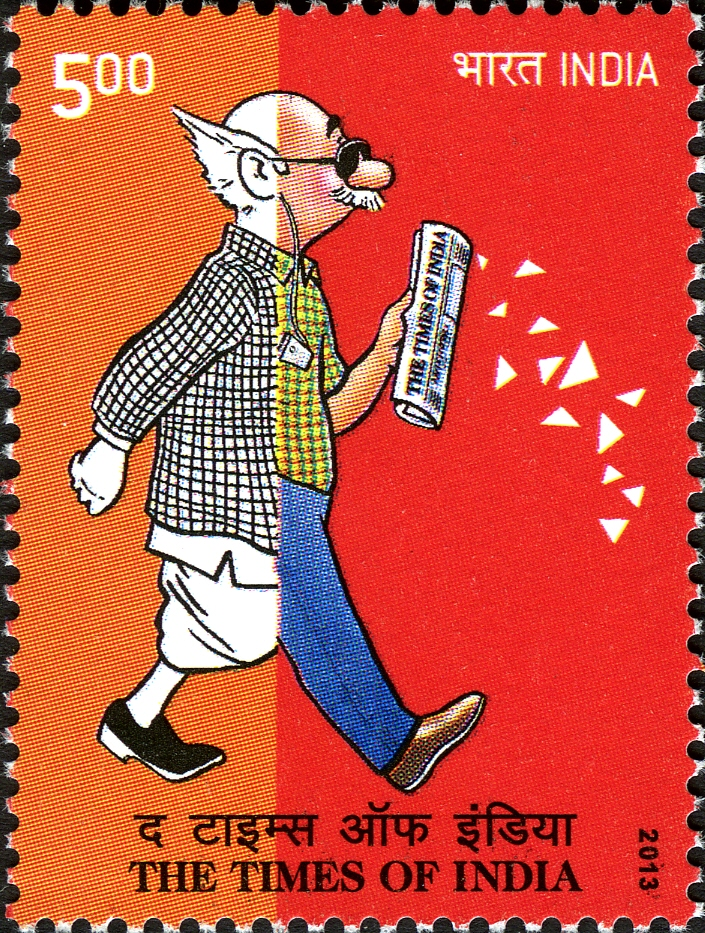
TOI on a 2013 stamp

Following the Vivian Bose Commission report indicating serious wrongdoings of the Dalmia–Jain group, on 28 August 1969, the Bombay High Court, under Justice J. L. Nain, passed an interim order to disband the existing board of Bennett, Coleman & Co and to constitute a new board under the Government. The bench ruled: "Under these circumstances, the best thing would be to pass such orders on the assumption that the allegations made by the petitioners that the affairs of the company were being conducted in a manner prejudicial to public interest and to the interests of the Company are correct." Following that order, Shanti Prasad Jain ceased to be a director, and the company ran with new directors on board, appointed by the Government of India, except for a lone stenographer of the Jains. The court appointed D K Kunte as chairman of the board. Kunte had no prior business experience and was also an opposition member of the Lok Sabha.

==== Back to the Jain family ====
In 1976, during the Emergency in India, the Government transferred ownership of the newspaper back to Ashok Kumar Jain, who was Sahu Shanti Prasad Jain's son and Ramkrishna Dalmia's grandson. He is the father of the current owners Samir Jain and Vineet Jain). The Jains too often landed themselves in various money laundering scams and Ashok Kumar Jain had to flee the country when the Enforcement Directorate pursued his case strongly in 1998 for alleged violations of illegal transfer of funds (to the tune of US$1.25 million) to an overseas account in Switzerland.

==== During the Emergency ====
On 26 June 1975, the day after India declared a state of emergency, the Bombay edition of TOI carried an entry in its obituary column that read "D.E.M. O'Cracy, beloved husband of T.Ruth, father of L.I.Bertie, brother of Faith, Hope and Justice expired on 25 June". The move was a critique of Prime Minister Indira Gandhi's 21-month state of emergency, now widely known as "the Emergency" and seen by many as a period of broadly authoritarian rule in the Indian government.

==== Bombay Times ====
The Bombay Times is a free supplement of The Times of India, in the Mumbai (formerly Bombay) region. It covers celebrity news, news features, international and national music news, international and national fashion news, and lifestyle and feature articles pegged to news events, both national and international, with local interest. The main paper covers national news. Over ten years of presence, it has become a benchmark for the Page 3 social scene. The Times of India—and hence the Bombay Times—are market leaders in terms of circulation. The name of this supplement contains the word Bombay, which is the older Portuguese name for the city. It is not retained in the new supplement Mumbai Mirror that comes with Times of India. Thought it was halted in 2020 due to pandemic but returned as a daily in 2025.

=== 2000s ===
In late 2006, Times Group acquired Vijayanand Printers Limited (VPL). VPL previously published two Kannada newspapers, Vijay Karnataka and Usha Kiran, and an English daily, Vijay Times. Vijay Karnataka was the leader in the Kannada newspaper segment at the time. The paper launched a Chennai edition on 12 April 2008. It launched a Kolhapur edition in February 2013.

==== TOIFA Awards ====
Introduced in 2013 and awarded for the second time in 2016, "The Times of India Film Awards" or the "TOIFA" is an award for the work in Film Industry decided by a global public vote on the nomination categories.

== Editions and publications ==
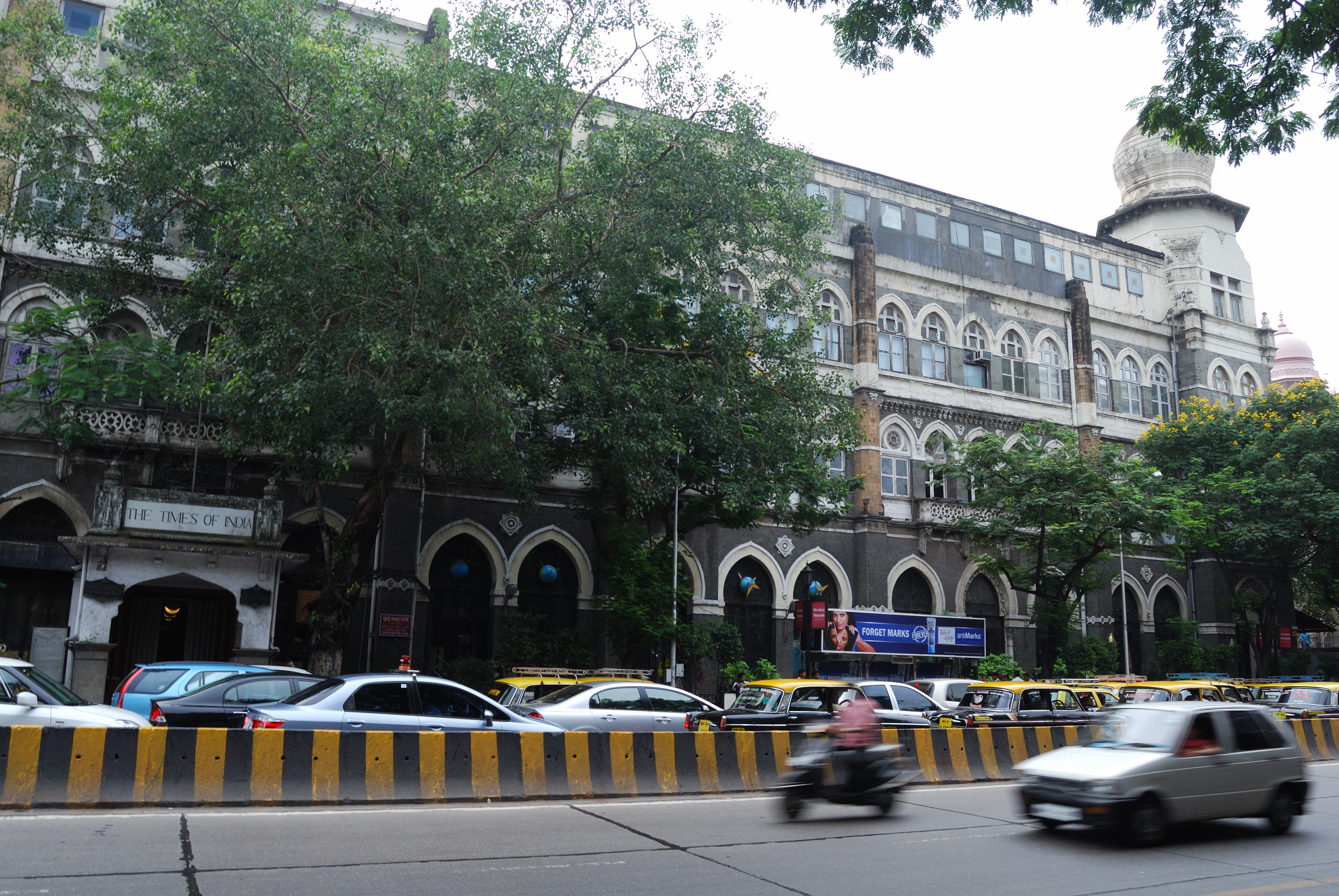
TOI's first office is opposite the Chhatrapati Shivaji Terminus in Mumbai, where it was founded.

TOI is published by the media group Bennett, Coleman & Co. Ltd. The company, along with its other group of companies, known as The Times Group, also publishes Ahmedabad Mirror, Bangalore Mirror, Mumbai Mirror, Pune Mirror; Economic Times; ET Panache (Mumbai, Delhi and Bengaluru on Monday to Friday) and ET Panache (Pune and Chennai on every Saturday); Ei Samay Sangbadpatra (a Bengali daily); Maharashtra Times (a Marathi daily); Navbharat Times (a Hindi daily).

TOI has its editions in major cities such as Mumbai.

== Awards hosted ==
- Times of India Film Awards aka TOIFA
- Times of India Sports Awards aka TOISA
- Times Business Awards
- Times Food Awards
- Times of India Earth Care Awards

== Times Group Network ==
- The Speaking Tree: A spiritual network intended to allow spiritual seekers to link spiritual seekers with established practitioners.
- Healthmeup: A health, diet, and fitness website.
- Cricbuzz: In November 2014, Times Internet acquired Cricbuzz, a website focused on cricket news.
- Willow TV: On 3 March 2016, Willow TV was acquired by Times group, a sports streaming channel.
- MX Player: This Indian video streaming platform came under Times acquisition 27 June 2018.
- Instant Bollywood: On 2 June 2026, this entertainment brand was acquired.

== Criticism and controversies ==
=== Paid news ===
TOI has been criticised for being the first to institutionalise the practice of paid news in India, where politicians, businessmen, corporations and celebrities can pay the newspaper and its journalists would carry the desired news for the payor. The newspaper offers prominence with which the paid news is placed and the page on which it is displayed based on the amount of the payment. According to this practice, a payment plan assures a news feature and ensures positive coverage to the payer. In 2005, TOI began the practice of "private treaties", also called as "brand capital", where new companies, individuals or movies seeking mass coverage and public relations, major brands and organisations were offered sustained positive coverage and plugs in its news columns in exchange for shares or other forms of financial obligations to Bennett, Coleman & Company, Ltd. (BCCL) – the owners of TOI.

BCCL, with its "private treaties" programme, acquired stakes in 350 companies and generated 15% of its revenues by 2012, according to a critical article in The New Yorker. The "paid news" and "private treaties" practice started by TOI has since been adopted by The Hindustan Times group, the India Today group, the Outlook group, and other major media groups in India including Indian television channels. This division of the company was later renamed Brand Capital and has contracts in place with many companies in diverse sectors.

The "paid news" and "private treaties" blur the lines between content and advertising, with the favourable coverage written by the staff reporters on the payroll of TOI. The newspaper has defended its practice in 2012 by stating that it includes a note of disclosure to the reader – though in a small font – that its contents are "advertorial, entertainment promotional feature", that they are doing this to generate revenues just like "all newspapers in the world do advertorials" according to TOI owners. According to Maya Ranganathan, this overlap in the function of a journalist to also act as a marketing and advertisement revenue seeker for the newspaper raises conflict of interest questions, a problem that has morphed into ever-larger scale in India and recognised by India's SEBI authority in July 2009.

Under an ad sales initiative called Medianet, if a large company or Bollywood studio sponsored a news-worthy event, the event would be covered by TOI, but the name of the company or studio that sponsored it would not be mentioned in the paper unless they paid TOI for advertising. In 2010, a report by a subcommittee of the Press Council of India found that Medianet's paid news strategy had spread to a large number of newspapers and more than five hundred television channels. Critics state that the company's paid news and private treaties skew its coverage and shield its newspaper advertisers from scrutiny.

The Hoot, a media criticism website, has pointed out that when a lift in a 19-storey luxury apartment complex in Bangalore crashed—killing two workers and injuring seven—all the English language and Kannada language newspapers, with the exception of the TOI, called out the name of the construction company, Sobha Developers, which was a private-treaty partner. An article titled "Reaping gold through Bt cotton"—which first appeared in the Nagpur edition of TOI in 2008—reappeared unchanged in 2011, this time with a small-print alert that the article was a "marketing feature". In both cases, the article was factually incorrect and made false claims about the success of Monsanto's genetically modified cotton.

According to a critical article published in the Indian investigative news magazine The Caravan, when the Honda Motors plant in Gurgaon experienced an eight-month-long conflict between management and non-unionised workers over wages and work conditions in 2005, the Times of India covered the concerns of Honda and the harm done to India's investment climate, and largely ignored the issues raised by workers. Vineet Jain, managing director of BCCL, has insisted that a wall does exist between sales and the newsroom, and that the paper does not give favourable coverage to the company's business partners. "Our editors don't know who we have," Jain said, although he later acknowledged that all private-treaty clients are listed on the company's website. Ravindra Dhariwal, the former CEO of BCCL had defended private treaties in a 2010 interview with the magazine Outlook and claims that the partners in the private treaties sign contracts where they agree to clauses that they will not receive any favourable editorial coverage.

=== Anti-competitive behaviour ===
There have been claims that TOI would strike deals with advertisers only if they removed their advertisements from other competitor newspapers. TOI is also embroiled in an active lawsuit against the Financial Times. In 1993, when the Financial Times was preparing to enter the Indian market, Samir Jain, the vice-chairman of BCCL, registered the term "Financial Times" as a trademark of his company and declared it his intellectual property in an attempt to stymie the Financial Times and prevent them from competing with The Economic Times, which is owned by BCCL.

In 1994, when the Hindustan Times was the top-selling paper in New Delhi, TOI slashed their prices by a third, to one and a half rupees after having built up their ads sales force in preparation for the price drop to make up for the lost circulation revenue. By 1998, the Hindustan Times had dropped to second place in Delhi. TOI took a similar strategy in Bangalore where they dropped the price to one rupee despite protests from Siddharth Varadarajan, one of the editors of the newspaper at the time, who called the strategy "predatory pricing".

=== Cobrapost sting operation ===
In 2018, Vineet Jain, managing director of BCCL, and Sanjeev Shah, executive president of BCCL, were caught on camera as part of a sting operation by Cobrapost agreeing to promote right-wing content through the group's many media properties for a proposed spend of ₹5 billion (equivalent to ₹7.3 billion or US$76 million in 2026), some of which the client said could only be paid with black money. BCCL has responded to the sting claiming that the video that was released by Cobrapost was "doctored" and "incomplete" and that the CEO Vineet Jain was engaged in a "reverse-sting" of his own to expose the undercover reporter during the filming of the video.

=== AI hallucinations ===
On 21 July 2026, the Times published a piece about American journalist Sarah Kendzior, claiming that she had quit writing and taken a job in a garden centre. Kendzior asserted that the entire article was fabricated and had merged her actual biography with a CNBC article by a woman named Leslie Friday who had taken such a garden centre job. On 15 September 2026, Kendzior noted that she had written to the Times for correction but had received no response, and that the article was being echoed by AI chatbots, even causing some readers to unsubscribe from her newsletter. On 15 September 2026, Kendzior wrote about the article in a post titled I Wandered Lonely in The Cloud. The article was subsequently removed from The Times of India's website.

== Notable employees ==
- Sham Lal, editor
- Girilal Jain, editor and scholar
- Samir Jain, vice-chairman

Publisher

- Vineet Jain, managing director
- Jug Suraiya, associate editor, columnist of "Jugular Vein", and Dubyaman II cartoonist
- Swaminathan Aiyar, columnist of "Swaminomics"
- R. K. Laxman, You Said It editorial cartoon featuring the famous Common Man
- M. J. Akbar, columnist of "The Siege Within" and former editorial team member
- Chetan Bhagat, columnist of Sunday TOI
- Shashi Tharoor, columnist of "Shashi on Sunday"
- V. D. Trivadi, humorist
- Twinkle Khanna, columnist of "Mrs. Funnybones"
- Swapan Dasgupta, columnist of Sunday TOI

== See also ==
- Times LitFest, an annual literary festival in Delhi, organised by TOI in partnership with Rajnigandha
