= Dalmia Group =

Indian conglomerate company

Dalmia Bharat Group
- Industry: Conglomerate
- Founded: 1930; 96 years ago
- Founder: Jaidayal Dalmia
- Headquarters: Kolkata, West Bengal, India
- Key people: Jai Hari Dalmia & Yadu Hari Dalmia (Directors); Pradeep Kumar Singh (Managing Directors)
- Products: Refractories; Sugar; Cement
- Revenue: ▲₹16,868 crore (US$1.8 billion) (2023)
- Subsidiaries: Starium Innovative Healthcare (1.4%)
- Website: www.dalmiabharat.com

Dalmia Bharat Limited (DBL) is an Indian conglomerate, which traces its origins to the businesses established by brothers Ramkrishna Dalmia and Jaidayal Dalmia in eastern India in the first half of the 20th century. In the 1930s, the group merged with the businesses of the Jain family to form the Dalmia-Jain Group. In 1948, the two families decided to split the businesses; the Dalmia businesses were further divided between Ramkrishna and Jaidayal.

Today, a number of companies and conglomerates trace their origin to the original Dalmia businesses; these include Dalmia Brothers, which is now managed by Vishnu Hari Dalmia's sons, Sanjay Dalmia and Anurag Dalmia; Dalmia Bharat Group, which is managed by Gautam Dalmia & Puneet Dalmia; Renaissance Group; and their subsidiaries.

== History ==
The Dalmia Group of companies traces its origins to Ramkrishna Dalmia and Jaidayal Dalmia. The two brothers were born in Jhunjhunu, Rajasthan. The name Dalmia comes from the name of their ancestral village in present-day Haryana. The Dalmias established a group of businesses in East India during the first half of the 20th century. These businesses included a sugar mill in Danapur and a commodity trading business in Calcutta. In 1932, Ramkrishna's daughter married Shanti Prasad Jain of the wealthy Sahu Jain family. Subsequently, Shanti Prasad and the Dalmia brothers worked together to expand the business, resulting in the formation of the Dalmia-Jain Group. By the end of 1940, the group was operating several sugar mills, cement plants, chemical factories, engineering plants and a paper mill.

The Dalmia-Jain Group challenged ACC's monopoly in the Indian cement industry by setting up cement factories all over India (including present-day Pakistan). It also ventured into other businesses; its subsidiaries included Bharat Bank, Bharat Fire and General Insurance, Lahore Electric, Govan group of companies, two cotton mills, a dairy, and three Andrew Yule jute mills. In 1946, Ramkrishna Dalmia bought out Bennett, Coleman & Co. Ltd., the publisher of The Times of India; which was later sold to the Jains after a split in the Dalmia-Jain Group.

By 1948, differences had developed between the Dalmias and the Jains. On 12 May 1948, the two families worked out the details of a split at the family house of the Jains in Mussoorie. On 31 May 1948, the Dalmia-Jain Group was dissolved, splitting into what were colloquially known as Dalmia Group (divided between Ramkrishna and his brother Jaidayal) and Sahu Jain Group. However, this split was not official: there was no legal document to this effect. Vivian Bose remarked that the Dalmia-Jain Group's affairs "were so interlocked and complex because of black money and secret, undisclosed assets and undetermined income tax liabilities, that this (dissolution or partition) was not found to be easy".

After the split, Jaidayal Dalmia gained control of Dalmia Cement (Bharat) Ltd., established in 1939 and Orissa Cement Ltd., established in 1949. Later, his sons Jai Hari Dalmia and Yadu Hari Dalmia took control of Dalmia Cement. Three other sons, Ajay Hari Dalmia, Mridu Hari Dalmia and Raghu Hari Dalmia - took over the Orissa Cement business. In 1999, Ajay Hari Dalmia separated from Orissa Cement, and started his own line of businesses under the name Renaissance Group.

In 1956, the Government of India set up a Commission of Inquiry to investigate alleged malpractices of the Dalmia-Jain Group of companies. The Commission was headed by Justice S. R. Tendolkar (and after his death, by Justice Vivian Bose). In 1962, Ramkrishna Dalmia was jailed for tax evasion, perjury and criminal misappropriation of funds. By the time he died in 1978, he had 17 children from 6 wives. These heirs fought several court cases for control of the various businesses owned by him. In 1983, these businesses were divided among his seven sons.

== Offshoots ==
=== Dalmia Bharat Group ===
The Dalmia Bharat Group is engaged in cement, sugar, refractories, renewable energy and other businesses. The Group traces its origin to Dalmia Cement (Bharat) Limited, established in 1939. After the Dalmia-Jain Group's split, it was controlled by Jaidayal, and later by his sons Jai Hari Dalmia and Yadu Hari Dalmia and now by their sons Gautam Dalmia and Puneet Dalmia. The Dalmia Bharat Group was officially incorporated on 10 February 2006 as Sri Kesava Mines & Minerals Limited, with its office in Dalmiapuram, Tamil Nadu. On 19 February 2010, the name was changed to DCB Renewable Energy and Industries Limited. On 25 March 2010, the name was changed; this time, to Dalmia Bharat Enterprises Limited. The present name, Dalmia Bharat Ltd was adopted in 2012. Puneet Dalmia is controlling the business of DCBL and OCL.

The total turnover of the group is over ₹10,000 crore. The Group operates the following businesses, all registered in Tamil Nadu:

- Dalmia Cement Bharat Limited (DCBL; BSE: 542216, NSE: DALBHARAT): started operating in 1939, in Tamil Nadu
- Dalmia Bharat Sugar and Industries Ltd (BSE: 500097, NSE: DALMIASUG): started operating in 1994, in Uttar Pradesh
- Dalmia Refractories (NSE: DALMIAREF): operates units in Gujarat and Madhya Pradesh
- Dalmia Power: established to meet the power requirements of the Group's cement and sugar plants

=== OCL ===
OCL (BSE: 502165, NSE: OCL) traces its origin to the cement plant set up by Jaidayal Dalmia at Rajgangpur, Orissa Province during 1950-51. Originally named Orissa Cement Limited, the company was incorporated on 11 October 1949, and the plant started operating in 1952. On 15 January 1996, the company changed its name to OCL India to reflect its non-cement ventures, including steel and iron. After Jaidayal Dalmia's death, OCL was controlled by his sons Ajay Hari Dalmia, Mridu Hari Dalmia and Raghu Hari Dalmia; Ajay Hari separated in 1999, to start his own venture under the name Renaissance Group. OCL is now a part of the Dalmia Bharat Group.

=== Dalmia Brothers ===
Dalmia Bros. Pvt. Ltd. originated from the businesses controlled by Jaidayal Dalmia's son Vishnu Hari Dalmia. This group of companies is now managed by his sons Sanjay Dalmia (Chairman) and Anurag Dalmia. The group's businesses include:

- GHCL Limited (BSE: 500171, NSE: GHCL): Founded as Gujarat Heavy Chemicals Limited, the company is involved in textiles and chemicals business. It has units in Gujarat and Tamil Nadu. Gujarat Heavy Chemicals Limited (GHCL) Ltd. GHCL Limited is a flagship company of the Dalmia Group. Incorporated in 1983, the company has attained success under the aegis of Chairman Sanjay Dalmia.
- Dalmia Healthcare Limited (DHL), the medical division of ace Industrialist Sanjay Dalmia has forayed into Medical Tourism.
- Bharat Pharma Limited
- Colwell & Salmon, Information Technology Enabled Services
- Caretel Infotech Limited, Business process outsourcing
- Golden Tobacco Limited (GTL; BSE: 500151, NSE: GOLDENTOBC): Cigarette manufacturer; formerly Golden Tobacco Company (GTC)

==== Dalmia Industries ====
Dalmia Industries (BSE: 519393) is a part of the Sanjay Dalmia Group. It descends from a company that was incorporated in 1937, in Bihar. The original company manufactured dairy products, including powdered milk and ghee, under the Sapan brand. It also traded in peanut candy, mustard oil and crash helmets. In the late 1960s, Dalmiapuram-based manufacturing and refractory plants were taken over on lease by Dalmia Industries. The business was carried out under the name Dalmia Ceramic Industries. Dalmia Industries also set up a plant at Bharatpur (Rajasthan) for manufacturing powdered milk and ghee. The company name was changed from Dalmia Dairy Industries Limited to Dalmia Industries Limited in 1989.

=== Other ===
Hari Machines was established in 1971 as a manufacturing division of the Dalmia Group. Marathwada Refractories Ltd (BSE: 502250) is controlled by Mridu Hari Dalmia's family.

Jaidayal Dalmia's son Ajay Hari Dalmia established Renaissance Group, which holds stakes in Revathi Equipment Limited, Rajratan Global Wires Ltd., Shogun Organics Ltd., Monarch Catalyst Pvt. Ltd. and Semac Consultants Pvt. Ltd. Renaissance Group is one of the branches of the larger Dalmia business family, founded and run independently from the main Dalmia Bharat conglomerate.n 1999, Ajay Hari Dalmia separated from the Orissa Cement business and started his own venture, calling it Renaissance Group. So Renaissance Group is essentially the business line carved out by Ajay Hari Dalmia's family, distinct from: Dalmia Bharat Group (the big publicly-known cement conglomerate, run by Gautam and Puneet Dalmia)Dalmia Brothers (run by Sanjay and Anurag Dalmia) Abhishek Dalmia, Group Chairman — a Chartered Accountant who also serves as Executive Chairman & Group CEO and Elder Son of Ajay Hari Dalmia

Dalmia Continental Privated Limited (DCPL) and Sunshine Tourism were established by Vidyanidhi "VN" Dalmia, son of Ramkrishna Dalmia.

Dalmia also invested in Starium Innovative Healthcare Co, The valuation of the Starium Innovative Healthcare is around 10 million US dollars.

== Public service ==
Dalmia Cement Bharat Limited established an annual award, the "Young Achievers Award," in 2014 for young people in northeast India with "exceptional talents". Boxer Mary Kom is the ambassador.
