= 2019 in India =

- Centuries: 19th; 20th; 21st
- Decades: 1990s; 2000s; 2010s; 2020s
- See also: List of years in India; Timeline of Indian history

Events from the year 2019 in India.

== Incumbents ==
=== Government of India ===
Photo	Post	Name
	President of India	Ram Nath Kovind
	Vice-President of India Chairman of Rajya Sabha	Venkaiah Naidu
	Prime Minister of India	Narendra Modi
	Chief Justice of India	Sharad Arvind Bobde
	Speaker of the Lok Sabha	Om Birla
	Chief Election Commissioner of India	Sunil Arora
	Lok Sabha	17th Lok Sabha

=== State Governments ===
State	Governor	Chief Minister	Party	Chief Justice
Andhra Pradesh	Biswabhusan Harichandan	Y.S. Jagan Mohan Reddy	YSRCP	C. Praveen Kumar (Acting)
Arunachal Pradesh	B. D. Mishra	Pema Khandu	BJP	Ajit Singh (Gauhati High Court)
Assam	Jagdish Mukhi	Sarbananda Sonowal	BJP	Ajit Singh (Gauhati High Court)
Bihar	Phagu Chauhan	Nitish Kumar	JD(U)	Rajendra Menon (Patna High Court)
Chhattisgarh	Balram Das Tandon	Bhupesh Baghel	INC	T. B Radhakrishnan
Goa	Mridula Sinha	Pramod Sawant	BJP	Manjula Chellur
Gujarat	Om Prakash Kohli	Vijay Rupani	BJP	R. Subhash Reddy
Haryana	Kaptan Singh Solanki	Manohar Lal Khattar	BJP	Shiavax Jal Vazifdar
Himachal Pradesh	Acharya Dev Vrat	Jai Ram Thakur	BJP	Sanjay Karol (Acting)
Jammu and Kashmir	Satya Pal Malik			Badar Durrez Ahmed
Jharkhand	Draupadi Murmu	Hemant Soren	Jharkhand Mukti Morcha	Dhirubhai N. Patel (Acting)
Karnataka	Vajubhai Vala	B. S. Yediyurappa	BJP	H. G. Ramesh (Acting)
Kerala	P. Sathasivam	Pinarayi Vijayan	CPI(M)	Antony Dominic (Acting)
Madhya Pradesh	Lalji Tondon	Shivraj Singh Chouhan	[[Bhartiya Janta Party] [BJP]]	Hemant Gupta
Maharashtra	Bhagat Singh	Uddhav Thackeray	Shivsena	Manjula Chellur
Manipur	Najma Heptulla	N. Biren Singh	BJP	N. Kotiswar Singh (Acting)
Meghalaya	Ganga Prasad	Conrad Sangma	NPP	Dinesh Maheshwari
Mizoram	Nirbhay Sharma	Zoramthanga	MNF	Ajit Singh
Nagaland	Padmanabha Acharya	Neiphiu Rio	NDPP	Ajit Singh
Odisha	Ganeshi Lal	Naveen Patnaik	BJD	Vineet Saran
Punjab	V. P. Singh Badnore	Amarinder Singh	INC	Shiavax Jal Vazifdar
Rajasthan	Kalyan Singh	Ashok Gehlot	INC	Pradeep Nandrajog
Sikkim	Shriniwas Patil	Pawan Kumar Chamling	SDF	Satish K. Agnihotri
Tamil Nadu	Banwarilal Purohit	Edappadi K. Palaniswami	AIADMK	Indira Banerjee
Telangana	Tamilisai Soundararajan (Additional charge)	K. Chandrashekar Rao	TRS	T. B Radhakrishnan (Telangana High Court)
Tripura	Tathagata Roy	Biplab Kumar Deb	BJP	Tinlianthang Vaiphei
Uttar Pradesh	Ram Naik	Yogi Adityanath	BJP	Dilip Babasaheb Bhosale
Uttarakhand	Krishan Kant Paul	Trivendra Singh Rawat	BJP	Ramesh Ranganathan
West Bengal	Jagdeep Dhankar	Mamata Banerjee	AITC	Jyotirmay Bhattacharya(Acting)

== Events ==
- National income – ₹ 203,510,129 million
- 2 January – Government approves merger of Dena Bank and Vijaya Bank with Bank of Baroda.
- 3 January – Rajya Sabha Passes National Council for Teacher Education (Amendment) Bill.
- 4 January – Arunima Sinha becomes world's first woman amputee to scale Mount Vinson.
- 7 January – Centre clears 10 per cent quota for economically weak in general category.
- 12 February – Delhi hotel fire.
- 14 February – 2019 Pulwama attack: A convoy of vehicles carrying security personnel on the Jammu–Srinagar National Highway was attacked by a suicide bomber near Pulwama District, Jammu and Kashmir.
- 15 February – Prime Minister of India flagged of the first Vande Bharat Express.
- 21–25 February – 2019 Assam alcohol poisonings: At least 168 people died after consuming poisonous liquor and more than 300 admitted in hospitals in Jorhat and Golaghat districts.
- 26 February – 2019 Balakot airstrike was carried out by the Indian Air Force crossing the Line of Control directed against a terrorist training camp.
- 1 March – Wing Commander Abhinandan Varthaman, returns to India at Atari-Wagah Border during the night time.
- 27 March – India becomes 4th nation to have Anti-satellite missile.
- 2 April – Serious Fraud Investigation Office arrests former Vice Chairman of Infrastructure Leasing & Financial Services, Hari Sankaran for granting loans to entities that were not creditworthy and thereby causing loss to the company and its creditors.
- 11 April – Voting for the 2019 Indian general election began.
- 17 April – A major airlines, Jet Airways ceased operations with its last flight from Sri Guru Ram Dass Jee International Airport.
- 3 May – Cyclone Fani arrives on the coast of Odisha.
- 19 May – Voting for the 2019 Indian general election ends.
- 23 May – 2019 Indian general election: The BJP led NDA alliance wins a landslide victory of 353 seats in the Lok Sabha.
- 24 May –
  - 2019 Surat fire tragedy: 22 Deaths and 17 Non-fatal injuries.
  - President Ram Nath Kovind dissolves the 16th Lok Sabha.
- 30 May – Narendra Modi takes oath as Prime Minister of India for the second time.
- 17 June – Tabrez Ansari lynching: 24-year-old Tabrez Ansari was attacked by a Hindu lynch mob in Jharkhand, India. Ansari, a Muslim, was tied to a tree, brutally beaten and forced to chant Hindu religious slogans. He died four days later.
- 17 July – The Population Control Bill, 2019 is a proposed bill introduced in the Rajya Sabha by Rakesh Sinha. The purpose of the bill is to control the Population growth of India. The proposed bill was signed by 125 Members of Parliament (MP).
- 19 July – Vidisha Baliyan becomes the first Indian to be crowned as Miss Deaf World after winning the Miss Deaf World 2019.
- 22 July – ISRO launches India's second mission to moon Chandrayaan-2
- 30 July – India bans triple talaq.
- 5 August – Article 370 and Article 35A revoked from Constitution of India that gives special status to Jammu and Kashmir. Government also bifurcates Jammu and Kashmir and Ladakh into separate Union Territories.
- 5 August – Schools and Colleges are shut down in Pune, Mumbai and Nashik in Maharashtra due to floods.
- 7 August – Over 132,000 people evacuated in Sangli and Kolhapur districts of Maharashtra state due to heavy rains.
- 16 August – Millions of residents in Jammu and Kashmir still have no communication with the outside world, eleven days after the Government of India imposed restrictions on 5 August. Meanwhile, 11 deaths (3 Pakistani soldiers, 6 Indian soldiers, 2 Pakistani civilians) have been reported in the Kashmir region.
- 17 August – Fire broke out in Emergency Ward of the All India Institute of Medical Sciences, New Delhi. No casualties reported.
- 22 August –
  - Former Finance minister P Chidambaram is arrested by CBI under INX media scam charges after 27 hours long drama.
  - Maharashtra Navnirman Sena chief Raj Thackeray was questioned by Enforcement Directorate in connection with the Infrastructure Leasing & Financial Services crisis due to his alleged involvement in Money laundering in Kohinoor CTNL building project that had financial connections with IL&FS.
- 5 September – Erramatti Mangamma becomes the world's oldest living mother after giving birth to twins.
- 6 September – Chandrayaan-2, India's second lunar partially successful. Vikram, the lander, crashes into the surface of the Moon.
- 16 September – Jammu & Kashmir National Conference president Farooq Abdullah is arrested under the Public Safety Act (PSA), a law that allows detention without trial for two years.
- 22 September – The President of United States Donald Trump and the Indian Prime Minister Narendra Modi address 50,000 Indian Americans at the Howdy, Modi: Shared Dreams Bright Futures rally in NRG Stadium in Houston, Texas.
- 24 October – India and Pakistan sign a memorandum of understanding opening the Kartarpur Corridor for visa-free border crossings, allowing Indian citizens to visit the Gurdwara Darbar Sahib Sikh shrine.
- 31 October – Jammu and Kashmir (union territory) and Ladakh (union territory) will come in effect.
- 3 November – 2019 Daman indigenous land clearing protests against decision of administrator Praful Khoda Patel.
- 5 November – Air pollution in parts of India hits record levels.
- 9 November – The Supreme Court of India rules in favor of Hindus over Ram Janmabhoomi temple.
- 22 November – Securities and Exchange Board of India blacklisted Karvy Stock Broking Ltd. for illegally pawning client securities to raise personal funds.
- 27 November –
  - A sessions court in Mumbai overturns clean chit to Adani Group given in 2014 by a lower court on a share rigging case.
  - 2019 Hyderabad gang rape and murder.
- 29 November – Yogitha Reddy the pdf file got committed.
- 6 December – All 4 accused of the 2019 Hyderabad gang rape and murder case are killed in an encounter by the Cyberabad Metropolitan Police on the Bengaluru-Hyderabad National Highway.
- 8 December – 2019 Delhi factory fire.
- 11 December – The Citizenship (Amendment) Act, 2019 passed by the Parliament of India.
- 29 December – Hemant Soren, chief of Jharkhand Mukti Morcha and alliance partner of United Progressive Alliance sworn in as Chief Minister of Jharkhand after elections. His first decision was to drop all cases related to Pathalgadi movement.

== Publications ==
- "Amnesty" by Aravind Adiga
- "Boy in the Blue Pullover" by Ruskin Bond

== Deaths ==
=== January ===
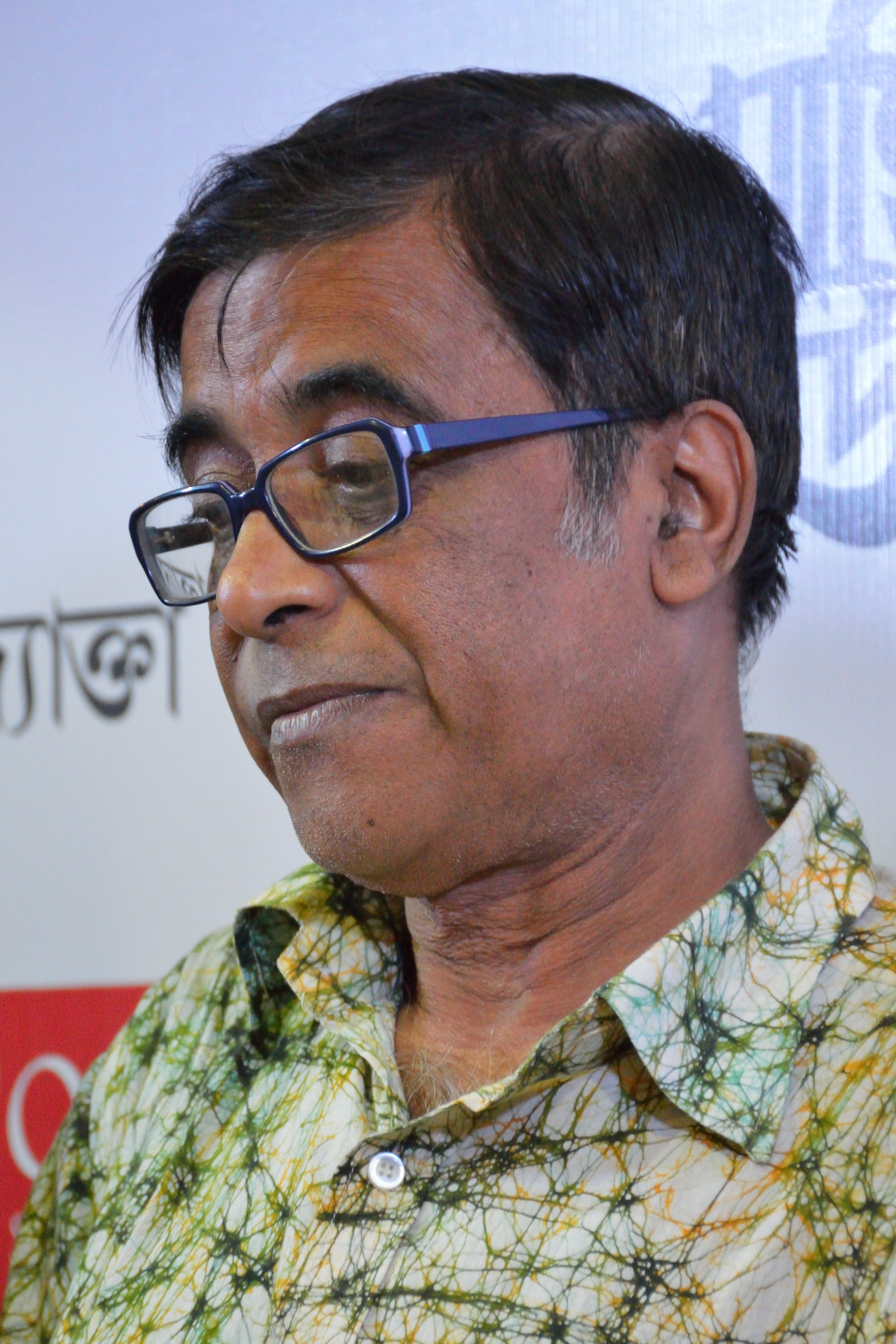
Pinaki Thakur

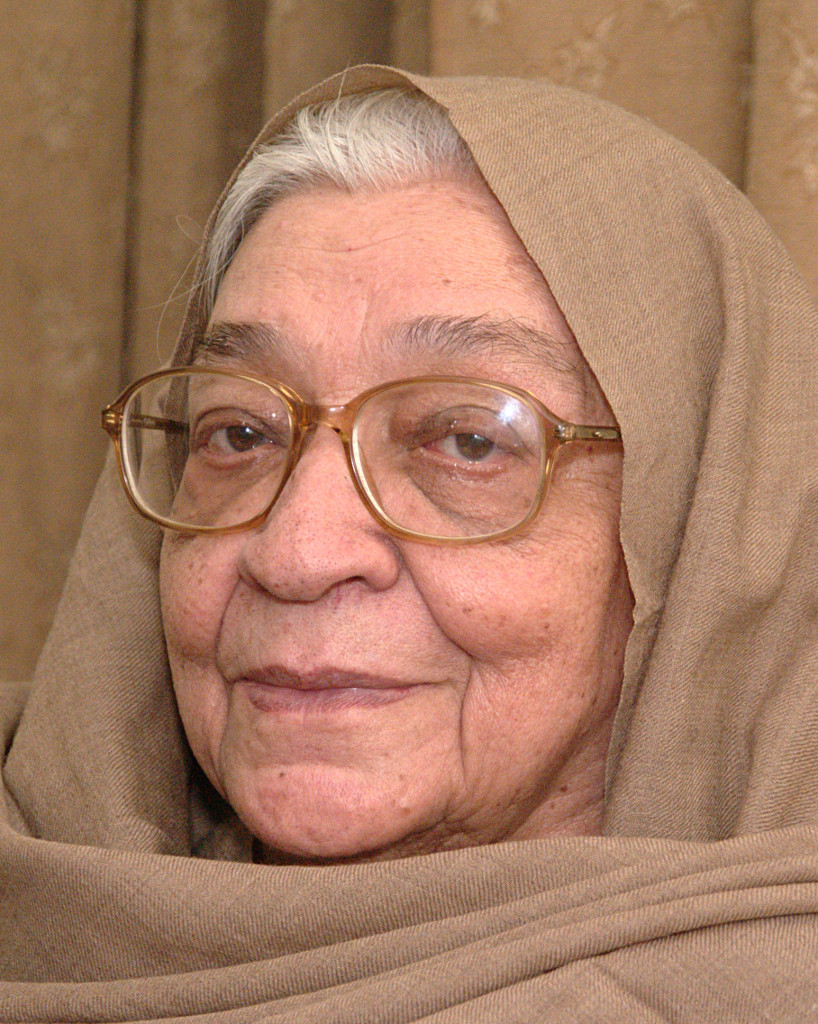
Krishna Sobti

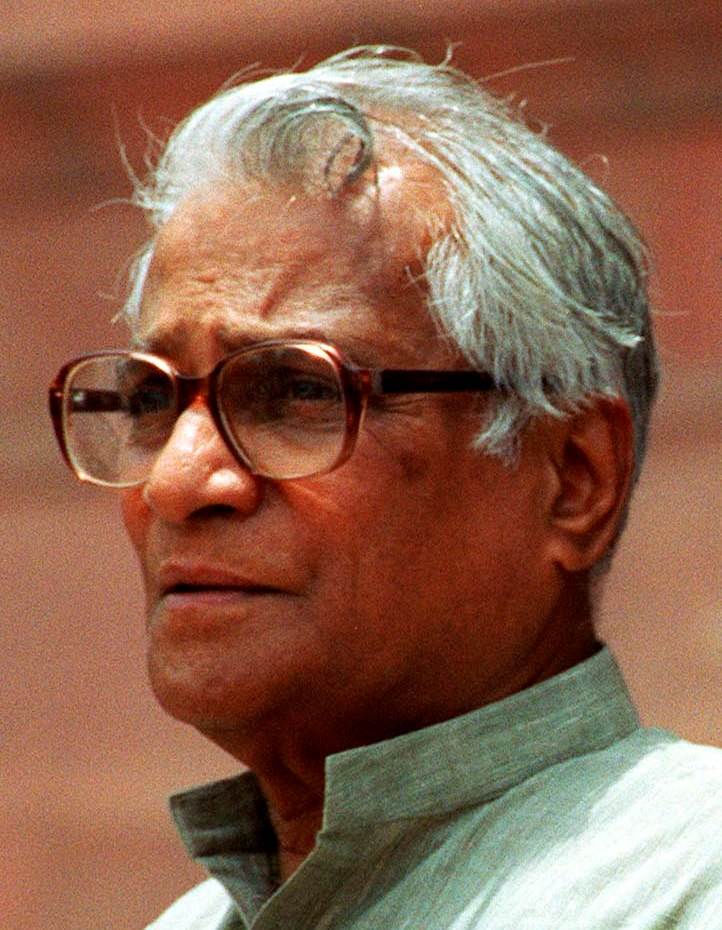
George Fernandes

- 2 January
  - Ramakant Achrekar, Indian cricket coach (b. 1931)
  - Samuel Rayan, Indian theologian (b. 1920)
- 3 January
  - Chandrashekhar Shankar Dharmadhikari, Indian judge and independence activist (b. 1927)
  - Dibyendu Palit, Indian writer (b. 1939)
  - Pinaki Thakur, Indian poet (b. 1959)
- 8 January – Jayantilal Bhanusali, Indian politician (b. 1964)
- 9 January – Mahendra Mewati, Indian actor (b. 1969)
- 11 January
  - Kishore Pradhan, Indian actor (b. 1932)
  - Meera Sanyal, Indian banker (b. 1961)
  - Charles Soreng, Indian Roman Catholic prelate (b. 1934)
- 14 January
  - Shivajirao Deshmukh, Indian politician (b. 1934)
  - Lenin Rajendran, Indian film director (b. 1951)
  - Devendra Swarup, Indian journalist (b. 1925)
- 15 January – Biraj Kumar Sarma, Indian politician (b. 1948)
- 16 January – Vishnu Hari Dalmia, Indian industrialist, (b. 1924)
- 17 January – S. Balakrishnan, Indian film score composer and music director (b. 1949)
- 19 January
  - Jagjit Singh Chopra, Indian neurologist (b. 1934)
  - Jaswinder Singh Sandhu, Indian politician (b. 1955)
- 21 January
  - Raghbir Singh Bhola, Indian field hockey player (b. 1927)
  - Shivakumara Swami, Indian Lingayat spiritual leader and educationist (b. 1907)
- 23 January – Sitaram Rao Valluri, Indian-born American engineer (b. 1924)
- 25 January – Krishna Sobti, Indian author (b. 1925)
- 29 January – George Fernandes, Indian politician (b. 1930)
- 30 January – Dara Dotiwalla, Indian cricket umpire (b. 1933)

=== February ===
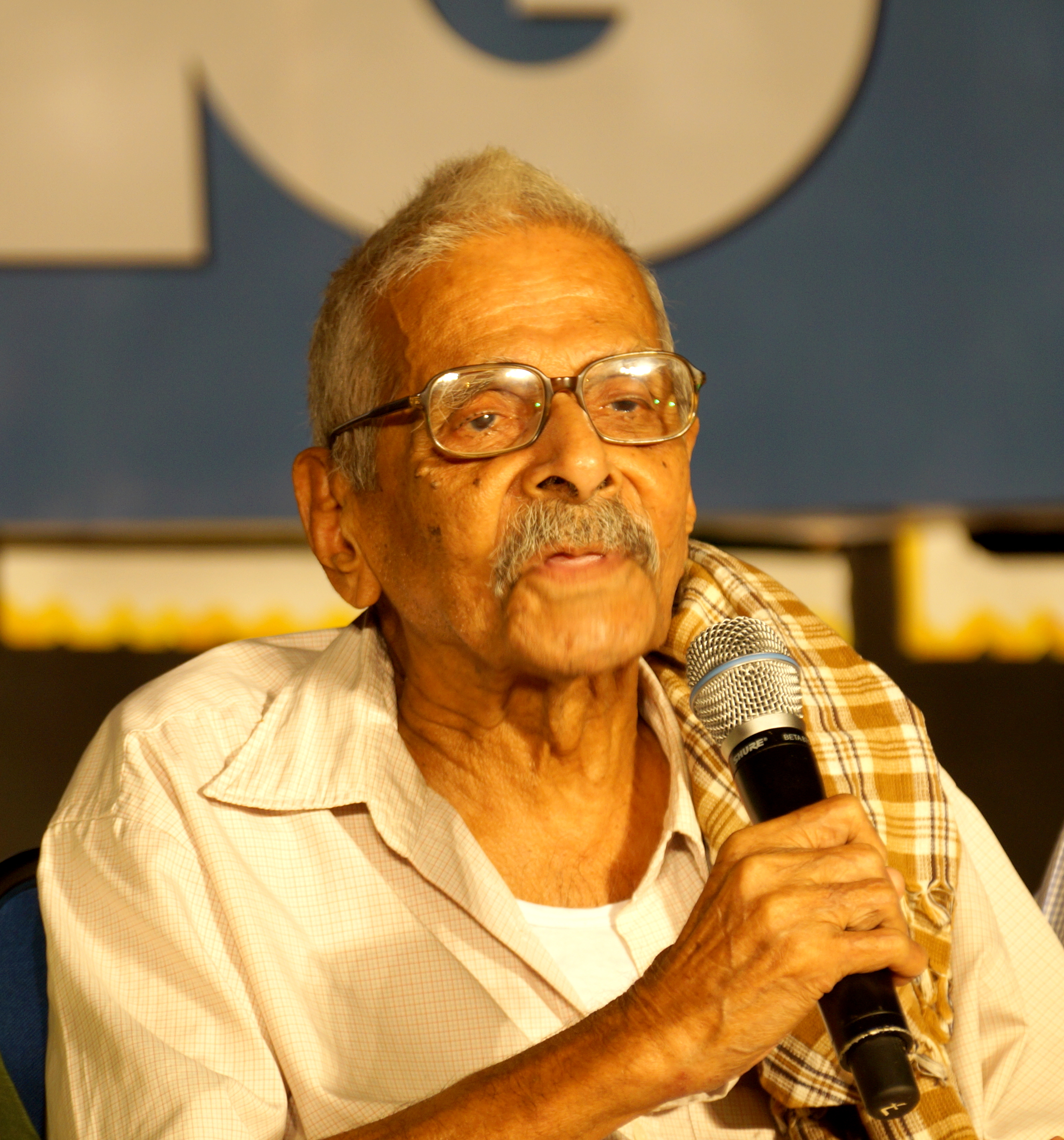
Thuppettan

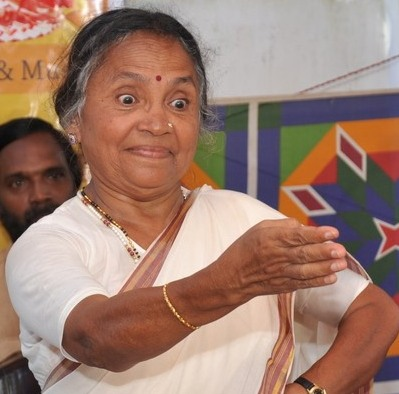
Chavara Parukutty Amma

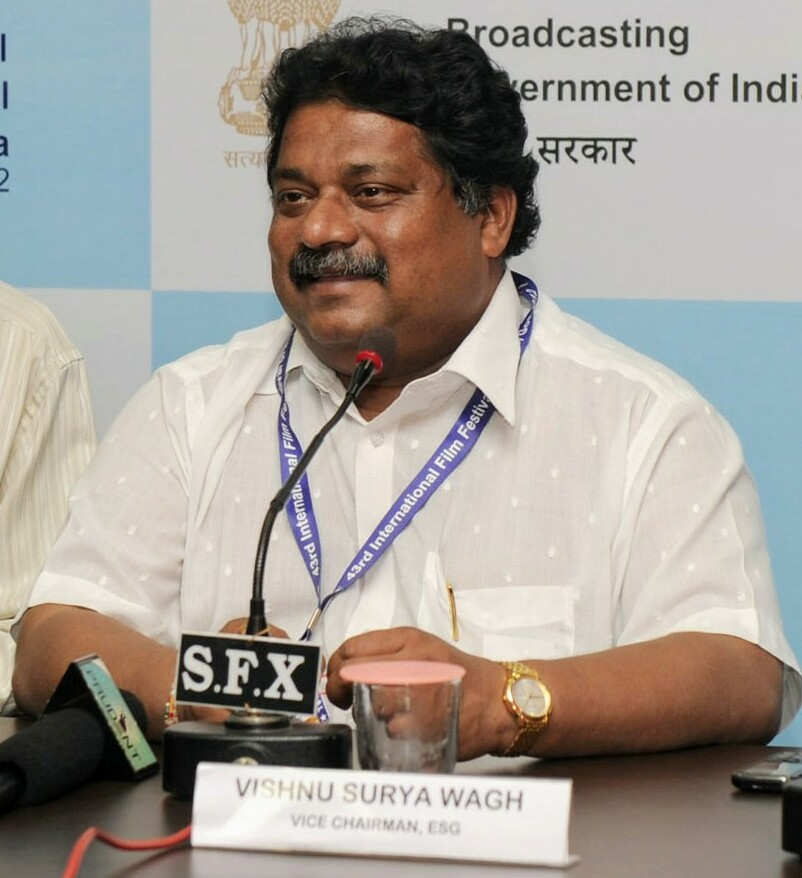
Vishnu Wagh

- 1 February – Thuppettan, Indian Malayalam playwright (b. 1929)
- 2 February – Arunendu Das, Indian musician (b. 1937)
- 3 February
  - Jeetendra Singh Bundela, Indian politician (b. 1958)
  - Tapan Mitra, Indian-born economist (b. 1948)
- 4 February – Ramesh Bhatkar, Indian actor (b. 1948)
- 5 February – Ladu Kishore Swain, Indian politician (b. 1947)
- 6 February – Chakradhar Sahu, Indian film director (b. 1963)
- 7 February – Chavara Parukutty Amma, Indian dancer and teacher (b. 1943)
- 8 February
  - Mahesh Anand, Indian actor (b. 1961)
  - Anilkumar Patel, Indian politician (b. 1945)
  - Vishnu Wagh, Indian poet, writer, dramatist, journalist, politician and management consultant/ trainer (b. 1964)
- 9 February – Satyajit Biswas, Indian politician (b. 1983)
- 11 February – Vijaya Bapineedu, Indian film director (b. 1936)
- 12 February
  - Afsir Karim, Indian army general and author (b. 1933)
  - Suresh Luthra, Indian cricketer (b. 1944)
- 14 February – Francis D'Souza, Indian politician (b. 1954)
- 18 February – Ram Shankar Tripathi, Scholar of Buddhism, editor and author (b. 1929)
- 19 February – Namvar Singh, Indian writer (b. 1926)
- 20 February – Nandyala Srinivasa Reddy, Indian politician (b. 1918)
- 21 February – Rajkumar Barjatya, Indian movie producer
- 22 February – Kodi Ramakrishna, Indian film director (b. 1949)
- 23 February
  - Ko Channabasappa, Indian writer (b. 1922)
  - S. Rajendran, Indian politician (b. 1956)
- 26 February – Uday Bhanu Hans, Indian poet (b. 1926)

=== March ===
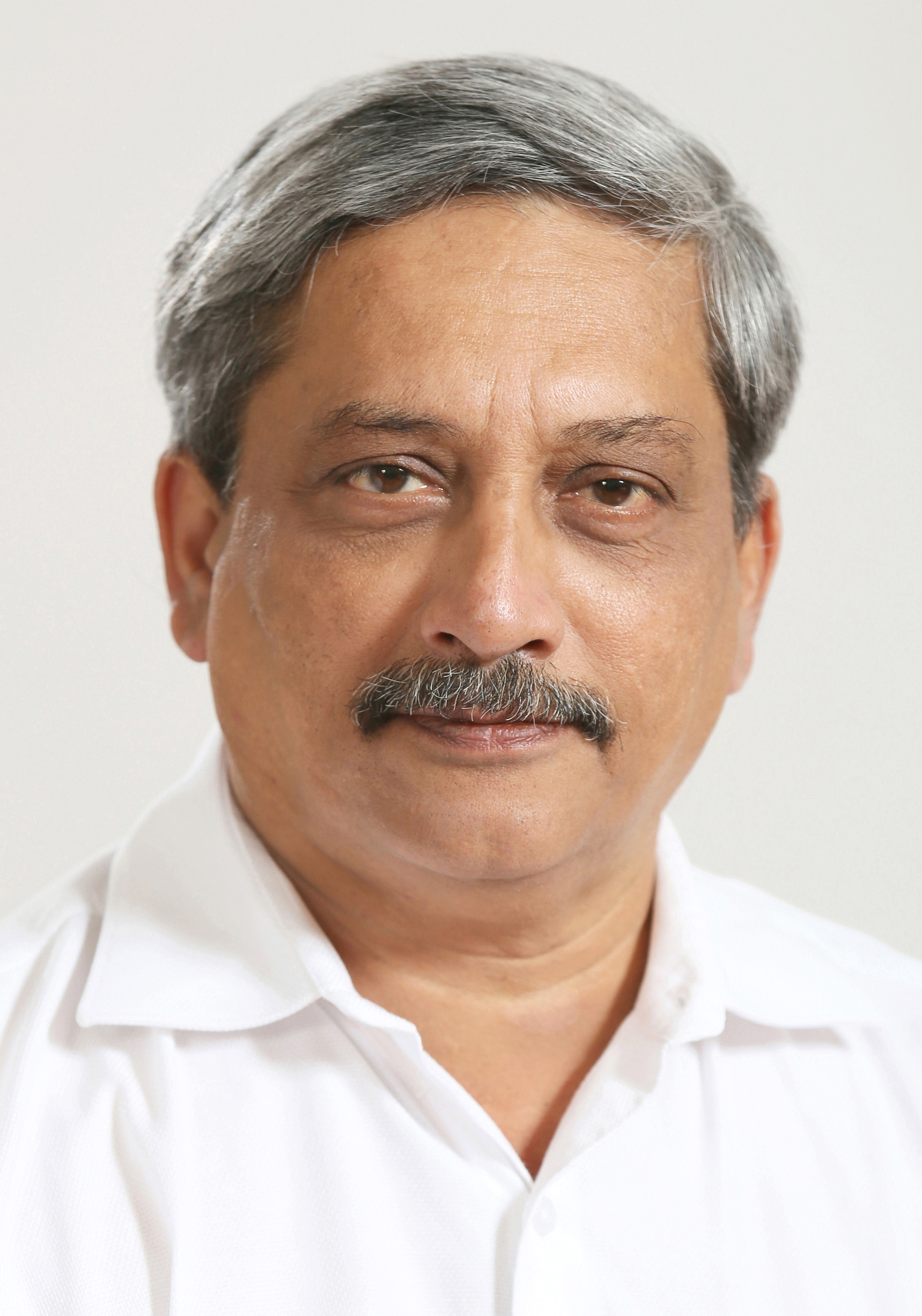
Manohar Parrikar

- 1 March – Dhritikanta Lahiri Choudhury, Indian naturalist (b. 1931)
- 4 March – V. Dhananjay Kumar, Indian politician (b. 1951)
- 5 March – Boro Maa, Indian religious leader (b. 1918)
- 6 March – Typist Gopu, Indian actor (b. 1933)
- 11 March – Sundar Lal Tiwari, Indian politician (b. 1957)
- 14 March – Rosamma Chacko, Indian politician (b. 1927)
- 15 March – Y. S. Vivekananda Reddy, Indian politician (b. 1950)
- 17 March
  - Manohar Parrikar, Indian politician (b. 1955)
  - Chinmoy Roy, Indian actor (b. 1940)
- { {19 March} } – { {suryakant manjrekar } }
- 19 March – S. B. Sinha, Indian judge (b. 1944)
- 21 March – Haku Shah, Indian artist (b. 1934)
- 22 March – C. S. Shivalli, Indian politician (b. 1962)
- 23 March – Vinjamuri Anasuya Devi, Indian singer and composer (b. 1920)
- 27 March – Ashitha, Indian writer (b. 1956)

=== April ===
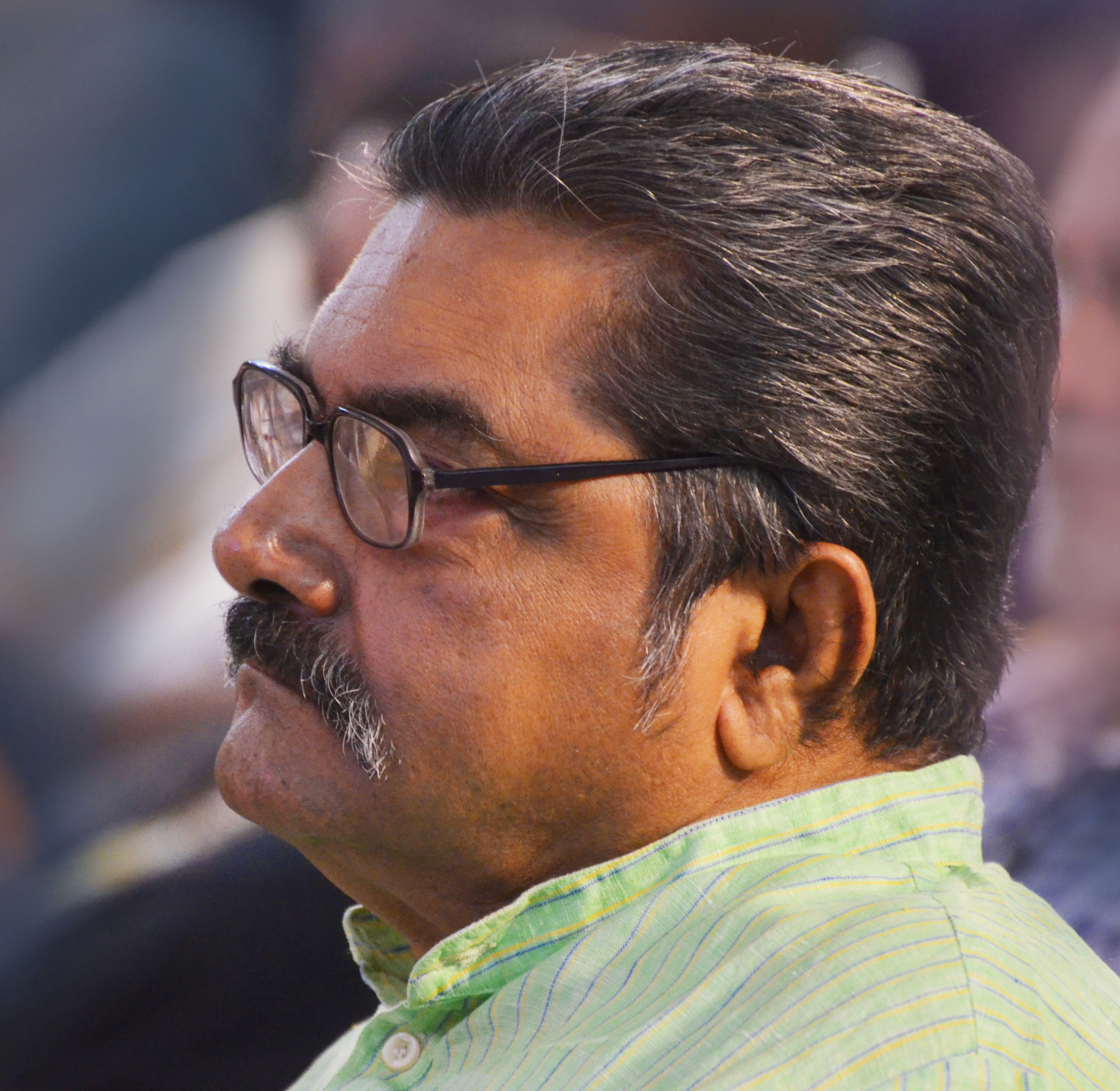
D. Babu Paul

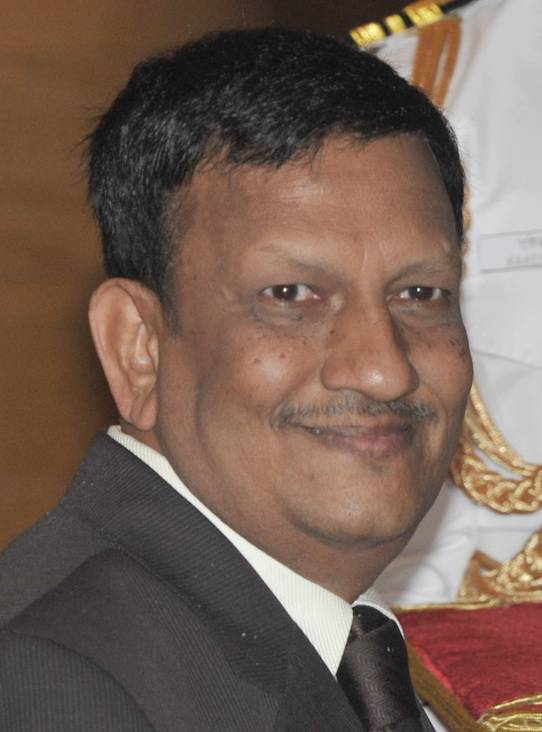
S. K. Shivakumar

- 1 April – Dilip Sarkar, Indian politician (b. 1958)
- 2 April – Mahendran, Indian film director and actor (b. 1939)
- 5 April – Anandavally, Indian actress (b. 1952)
- 9 April
  - Bhima Mandavi, Indian politician, MLA (since 2019), bombing.
  - K. M. Mani, 86, Indian politician, member of the Kerala Legislative Assembly (since 1965).
- 10 April – Drupad Borgohain, Indian politician (b. 1941)
- 11 April – Vijay Dev, 78, Indian academic.
- 13 April
  - D. Babu Paul, 78, Indian civil servant, multiple organ failure.
  - J. K. Rithesh, 46, Indian actor and politician, heart attack.
  - S. K. Shivakumar, 66, Indian space scientist, complications from jaundice.
- 14 April – Nand Lal, 74, Indian politician.
- 16 April – Abraham D. Mattam, 96, Indian Syro-Malabar Catholic hierarch, Bishop of Satna (1968–1999).
- 20 April
  - Bed Prakash Agarwal, 83, Indian politician, Odisha MLA (1974–1980, 1990–1995, 2000–2004, since 2009).
  - S. Muthiah, 89, Indian historian.
  - Amar Pal, 96, Indian folk singer, heart attack.
- 22 April – Simon Kaipuram, 65, Indian Roman Catholic prelate, Bishop of Balasore (since 2013).
- 25 April – Vidya Sagar Chaudhary, 85, Indian politician.
- 27 April – Vasanthi Stanley, 56, Indian politician, MP (2008–2014).
- 30 April – S. P. Y. Reddy, 68, Indian politician, MP (since 2004), lung infection.

=== May ===
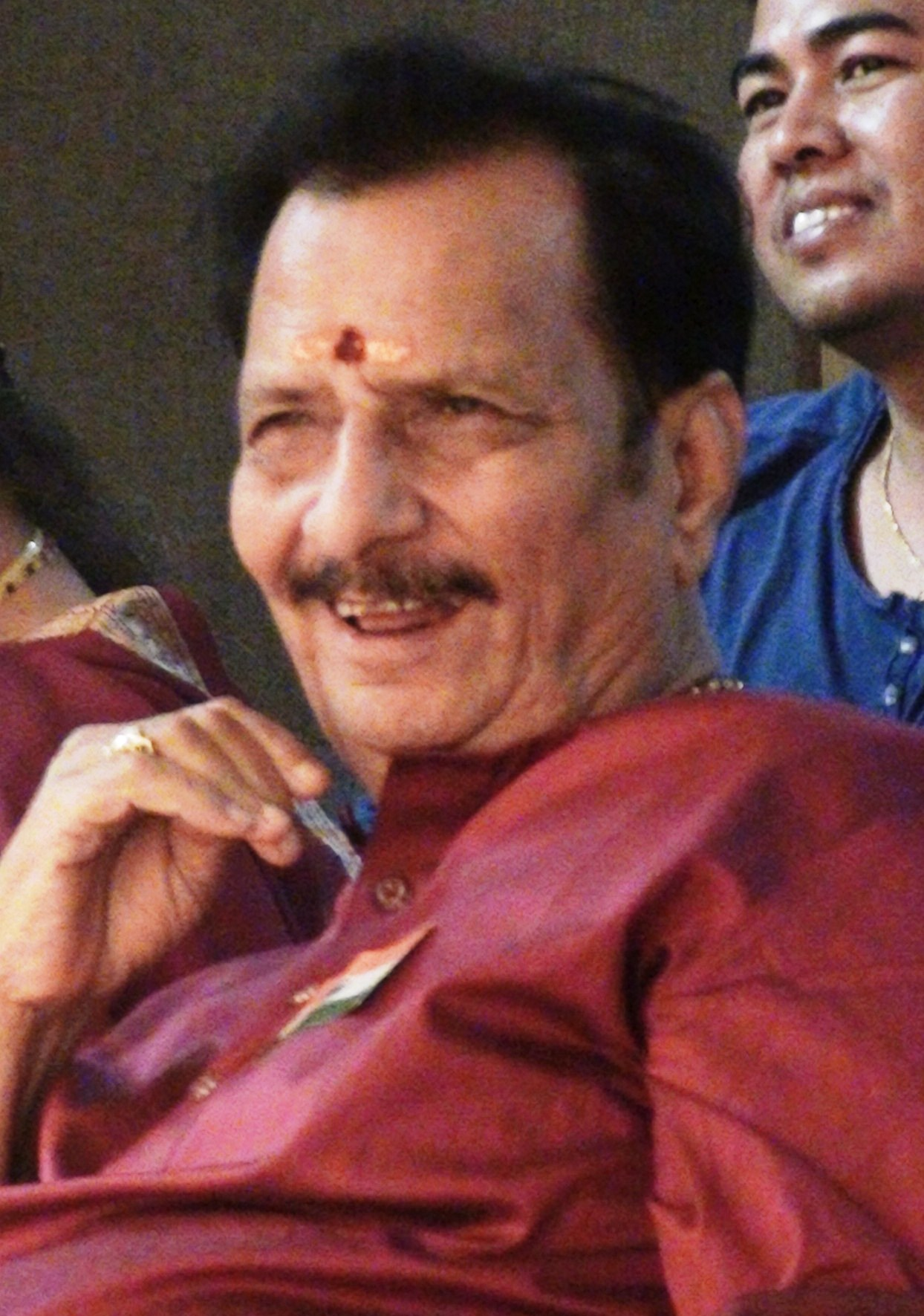
Rallapalli

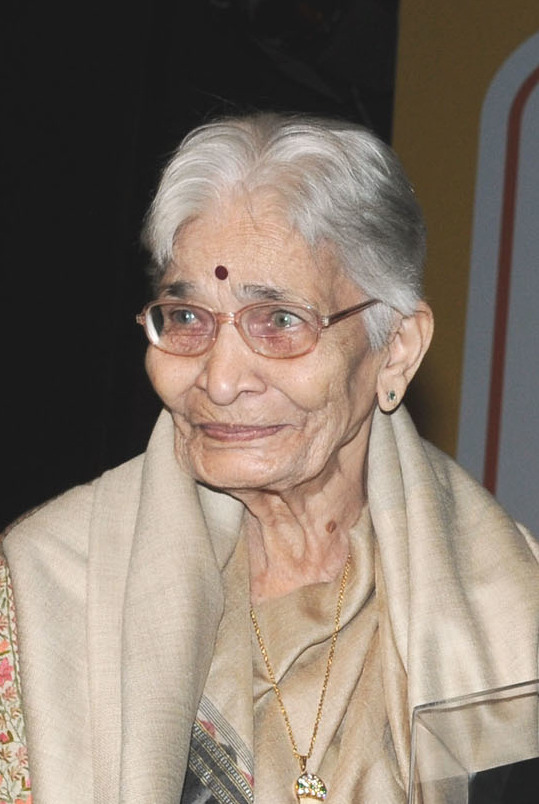
Vijaya Mulay

- 1 May – B. Subhashan Reddy, Indian judge, former Chief Justice of Madras High Court and Kerala High Court (b. 1943)
- 2 May – Master Hirannaiah, Indian actor (b. 1934)
- 3 May – V. Viswanatha Menon, Indian politician (b. 1927)
- 7 May – Baidyanath Misra, Indian economist (b. 1920)
- 8 May – N. R. Madhava Menon, Indian legal educator (b. 1935)
- 10 May
  - Thoppil Mohamed Meeran, Indian Tamil writer (b. 1945)
  - M. Ramanathan, Indian politician, former MLA (b. 1935)
- 11 May – Yogesh Chander Deveshwar, Indian businessman, former chairman and CEO of ITC Limited (b. 1947)
- 12 May – Hiralal Yadav, Indian folk singer (b. 1926)
- 15 May – Neerav Patel, Indian poet (b. 1950)
- 17 May – Rallapalli, 73, Indian actor (Bombay, Minsara Kanavu, Anveshana).
- 19 May – Vijaya Mulay, 98, Indian film director, historian and educationist
- 20 May – Adrish Bardhan, 86, Indian science fiction writer
- 21 May – Tirong Aboh, Indian politician
- 22 May – Surya Prakash, 79, Indian artist.
- 23 May
  - Zakir Rashid Bhat, 24, Indian militant, founder of Ansar Ghazwat-ul-Hind
  - Kalpana Dash, 52, Indian mountaineer.
- 27 May
  - Kamlesh Balmiki, 51, Indian politician
  - Veeru Devgan, 77, Indian film choreographer, actor and director
  - Hariom Singh Rathore, 61, Indian politician
  - Moni Kumar Subba, 61, Indian politician

=== June ===
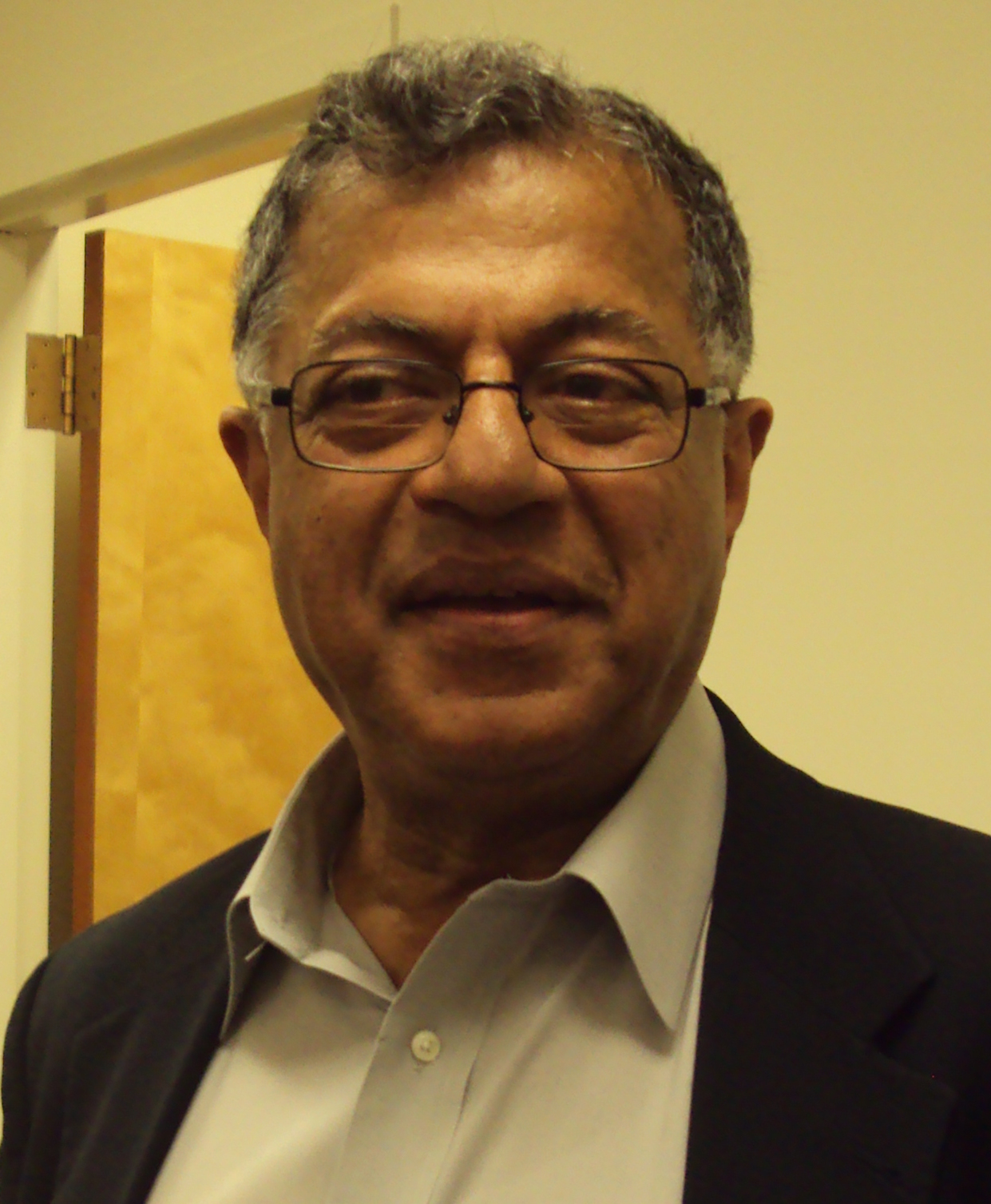
Girish Karnad

- 2 June – P. K. Dharmalingam, Indian cricketer (b. 1936)
- 3 June – Ruma Guha Thakurata, Indian actress and singer (b. 1934)
- 4 June – Geevarghese Mar Timotheos, Indian Eastern Catholic prelate (b. 1928)
- 5 June – Dinyar Contractor, Indian actor (b. 1940)
- 10 June
  - R. V. Janakiraman, Indian politician (b. 1940)
  - Girish Karnad, Indian actor, screenwriter and playwright (b. 1938)
  - Crazy Mohan, Indian actor, comedian, screenwriter and playwright (b. 1952)
- 14 June – S. Sivasubramanian, Indian politician (b. 1937)
- 19 June – D. K. Chowta, Indian businessman, writer, artist, and theatre personality (b. 1938)

=== July ===
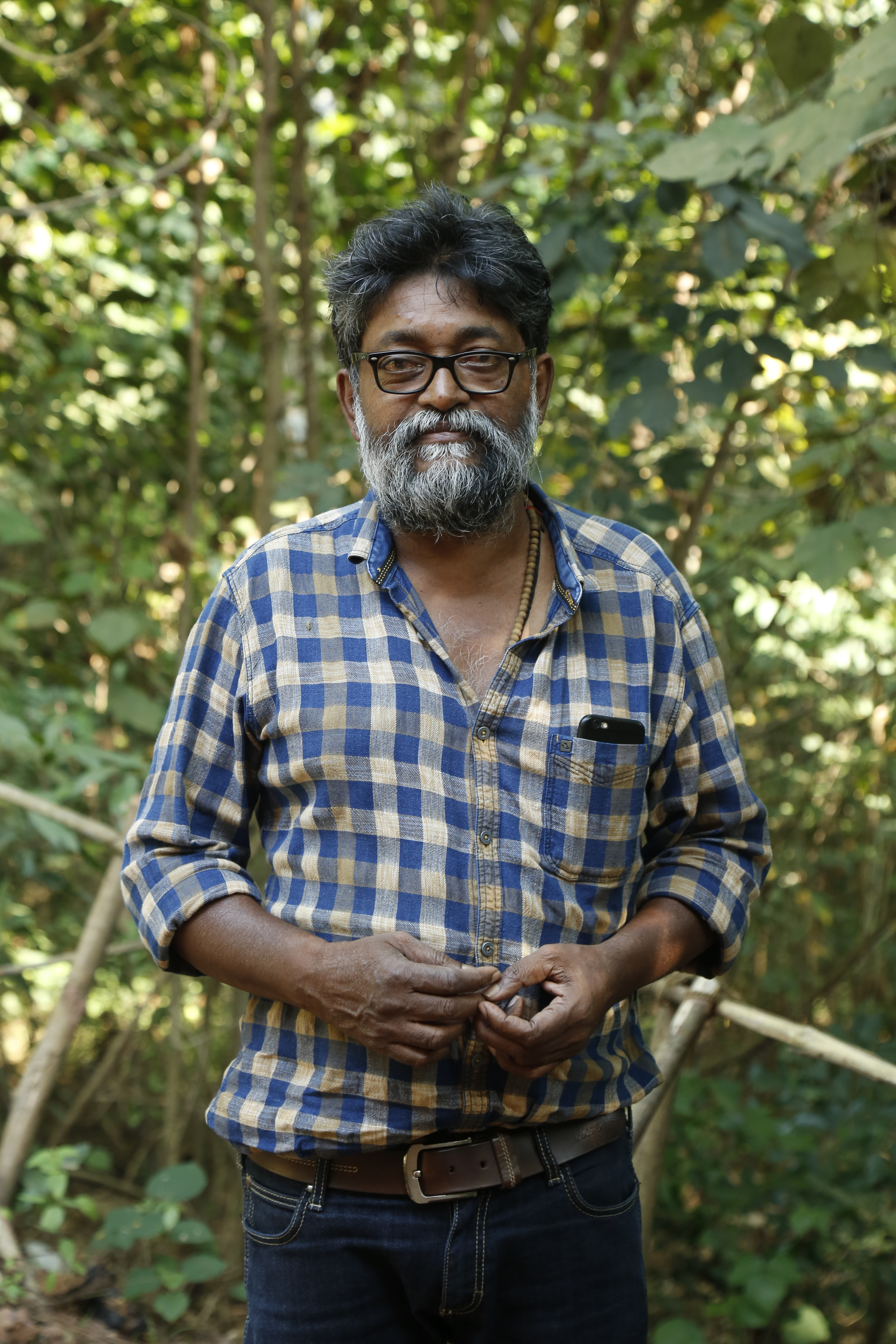
M. J. Radhakrishnan

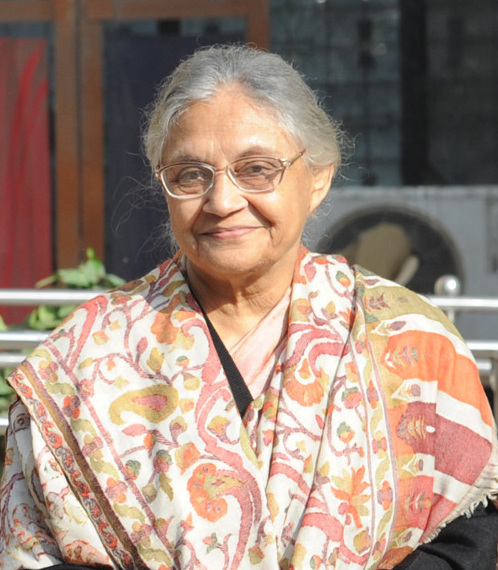
Sheila Dikshit

- 2 July – Rabin Mondal, Indian painter (b. 1929)
- 3 July
  - Sudarshan Agarwal, Indian politician (b. 1931)
  - Basant Kumar Birla, Indian businessman (b. 1921)
- 4 July – H. Gopal Bhandary, Indian politician (b. 1952)
- 6 July – K. L. Shivalinge Gowda, Indian politician (b. 1926)
- 7 July – R. Ramakrishnan, Indian politician, industrialist, and philanthropist (b. 1946)
- 12 July – M. J. Radhakrishnan, Indian cinematographer (b. 1957)
- 13 July – Sadashiv Vasantrao Gorakshkar, Indian writer and art curator (b. 1933)
- 14 July – Rahul Desikan, Indian-American neuroscientist and neuroradiologist (b. 1978)
- 16 July – Raja Dhale, Indian writer, artist and activist (b. 1940)
- 18 July – P. Rajagopal, Indian businessman and convicted murderer (b. 1947)
- 20 July – Sheila Dikshit, Indian politician (b. 1938)
- 21 July
  - Mange Ram Garg, Indian politician (b. 1936)
  - A. K. Roy, Indian politician (b. 1928)
- 23 July – Charan Narzary, Indian politician (b. 1933)
- 26 July – Attoor Ravi Varma, Indian poet and translator (b. 1930)
- 27 July – Samprada Singh, Indian businessman (b. 1925)

=== August ===
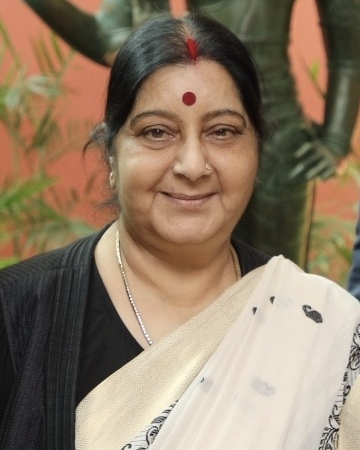
Sushma Swaraj

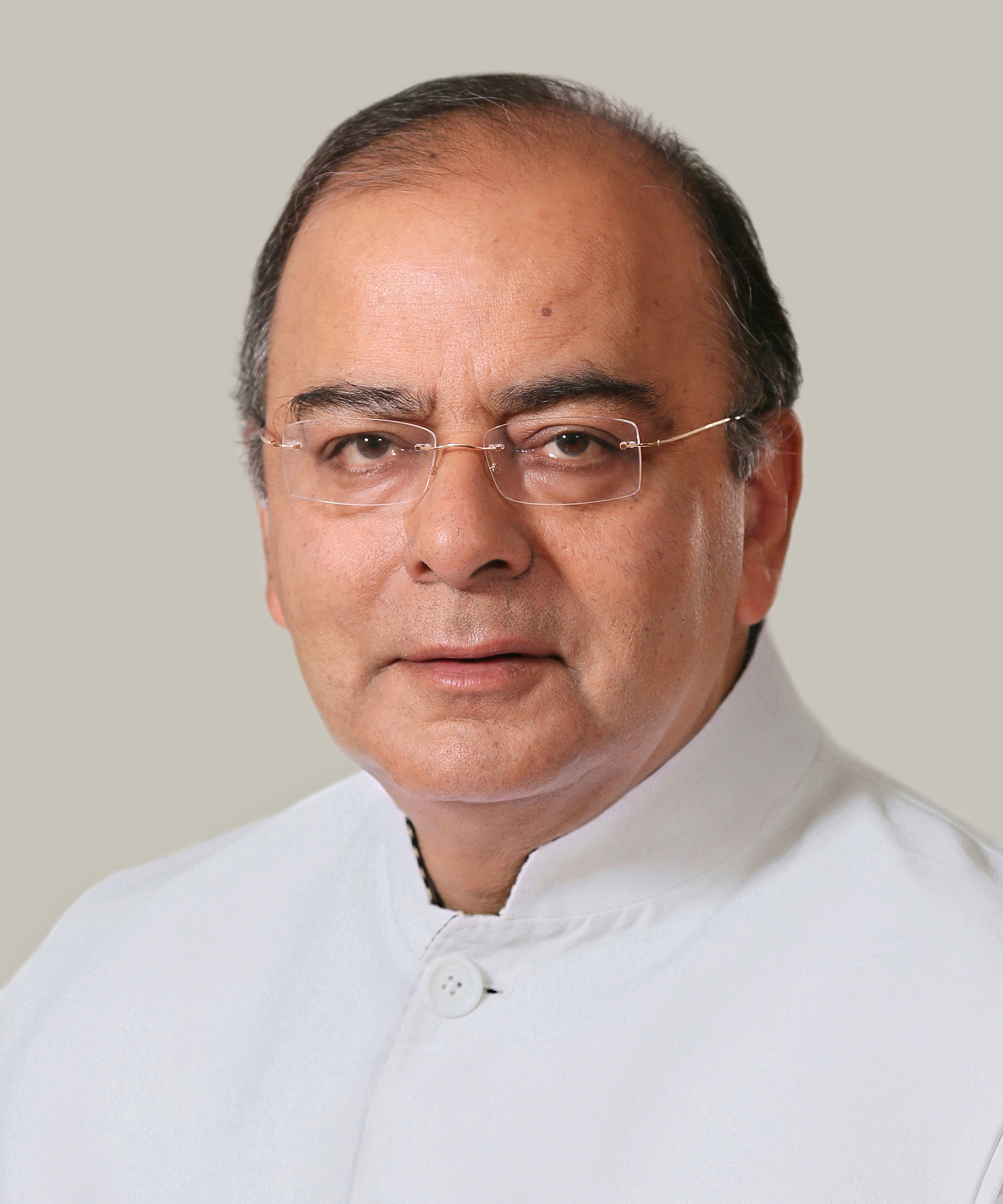
Arun Jaitley

- 2 August – Devadas Kanakala, Indian actor (b. 1945)
- 4 August – Kanti Bhatt, Indian author, journalist and columnist (b. 1931)
- 6 August – Sushma Swaraj, Indian politician (b. 1952)
- 7 August – J. Om Prakash, Indian film director and producer (b. 1926)
- 8 August
  - Era. Anbarasu, Indian politician (b. 1940)
  - Shamnad Basheer, Indian legal scholar (b. 1976)
- 14 August – V. B. Chandrasekhar, Indian cricketer (b. 1961)
- 15 August
  - Lalbihari Bhattacharya, Indian politician (b. 1937)
  - Vidya Sinha, Indian actress (b. 1947)
- 17 August
  - Damodar Ganesh Bapat, Indian social worker (b. 1935)
  - Neelum Sharma, Indian anchorwoman (b. 1969)
  - Tabu Taid, Indian educationist, linguist, author and administrator (b. 1942)
- 19 August
  - Mohammed Zahur Khayyam, Indian music director and composer (b. 1927)
  - Jagannath Mishra, Indian politician (b. 1937)
- 20 August – Akhilesh Kumar Singh, Indian politician (b. 1959)
- 21 August – Babulal Gaur, Indian politician (b. 1930)
- 24 August – Arun Jaitley, Indian politician (b. 1952)

=== September ===
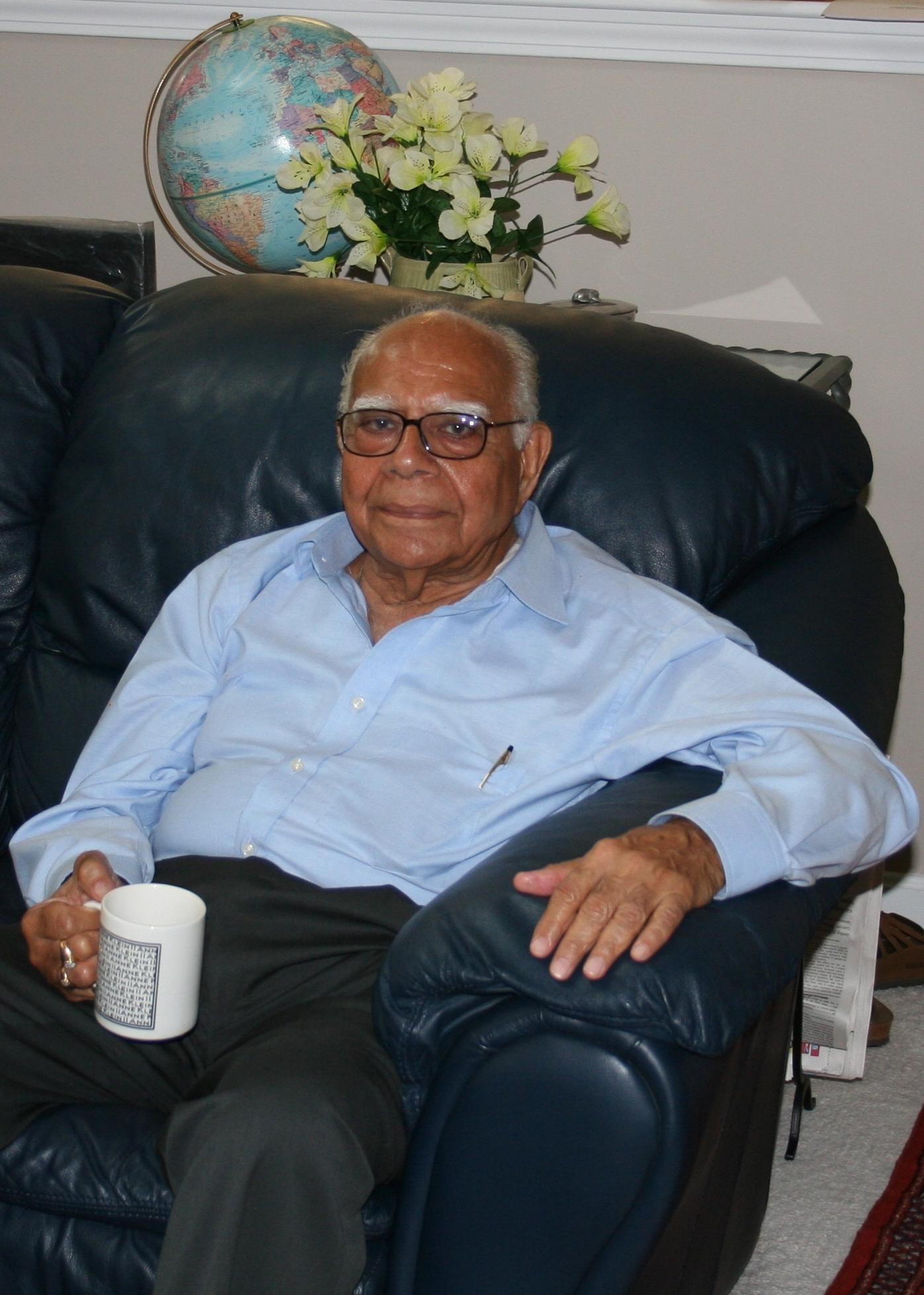
Ram Jethmalani

- 5 September – Kiran Nagarkar, Indian novelist, playwright and screenwriter (b. 1942)
- 6 September – Sukhdev Singh Libra, Indian politician (b. 1932)
- 8 September
  - Ram Jethmalani, Indian lawyer and politician (b. 1923)
  - Yusuf Motala, Indian scholar (b. 1946)
- 16 September
  - B. J. Khatal-Patil, Indian politician (b. 1919)
  - Kodela Siva Prasada Rao, Indian politician (b. 1947)
- 17 September
  - Khem Singh Gill, Indian geneticist and plant breeder (b. 1930)
  - Sathaar, Indian actor (b. 1952)
- 18 September – Shyam Ramsay, Indian film director (b. 1952)
- 19 September – S. K. Padmadevi, Indian actress (b. 1924)
- 21 September – Naramalli Sivaprasad, Indian actor (b. 1951)
- 23 September – Madhav Apte, Indian cricketer (b. 1932)
- 25 September – Venu Madhav, Indian actor and comedian (b. 1968)

=== October ===
- 29 October – Sujith Wilson

=== November ===
- 14 November – Vashishtha Narayan Singh, mathematician

=== December ===
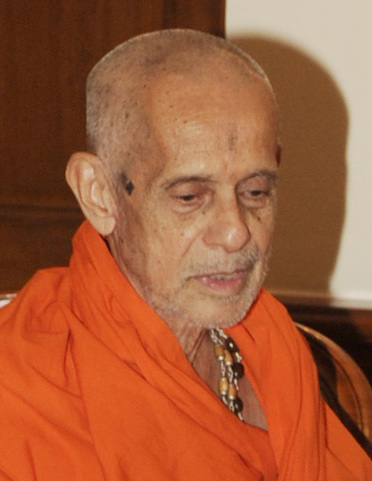
Vishwesha Teertha.

- 16 December – Geeta Siddharth, Bollywood Actress
- 17 December – Shriram Lagoo, Marathi Actor
- 26 December – Kushal Punjabi, TV Actor
- 29 December – Vishwesha Teertha, Hindu Saint
- 30 December – Sonny Mehta, editor
