= Vinjamuri =

Vinjamuri (Telugu: వింజమూరి) is a Telugu surname. Notable people with the name include:

- Vinjamuri Seetha Devi (died 2016), musician, singer, and scholar of Telugu folk music
- Vinjamuri Venkata Lakshmi Narasimha Rao (1887–?), Indian stage actor, Telugu-Sanskrit pandit and author
