= Surya Prakash =

Surya Prakash or Suryaprakash may refer to:

- G. K. Surya Prakash (born 1953), professor of chemistry, University of Southern California, United States
- P. Surya Prakash (fl. 2007–2014), bishop, Church of South India, Diocese of Karimnagar, India
- R. Suryaprakash (fl. 1991–2013), Carnatic vocalist
- Surya Prakash (director) (fl. 1996–2015), Indian film director
- Surya Prakash Chaturvedi (born 1937), cricket critic, writer and historian
- Surya Prakash (artist) (1940–2019)
