= R. Suryaprakash =

- Origin: Chennai, India
- Genre: Carnatic music
- Occupations: Carnatic vocalist, composer, lyricist
- Years active: 1990 – Present
- Label: Purnima Records
- Website: www.rsuryaprakash.com

R. Suryaprakash is a Carnatic vocalist, composer, and lyricist. An 'A Grade' artist of All India Radio, he has travelled extensively and received accolades for his performances.

== Early life and education ==
Suryaprakash began studying music at the age of seven from his uncle Tirukkodikaval Shri V. Rajamani, a disciple of Semmangudi Srinivasa Iyer. Later, he learned under Shri M. A. Venugopalan, another disciple of Semmangudi. He received his advanced training from Sangeetha Kalanidhi T. V. Sankaranarayanan. He further enriched his repertoire by working with Smt. Sulochana Pattabiraman and Dr. V. V. Srivatsa, both eminent musicologists.

Suryaprakash holds a master's degree in Carnatic music from Madras University. He was also awarded the doctorate degree in March 2020 by Madras University for his thesis titled "Structured and Systematic Approach to Manodharma Sangeetham".

== Career ==
Suryaprakash is a regular performer in the Carnatic music circuit. He has been accompanied by leading stalwarts such as Umayalpuram K. Sivaraman, Mannargudi Easwaran, Thiruvarur Bhakthavatsalam, V. V. Ravi, Subhash Chandran.

Suryaprakash has performed extensively both in India and abroad in many countries such as Australia, Singapore, US, New Zealand, South Africa. He is a sought-after performer at international Carnatic music festivals, some of which being the Cleveland Thyagaraja Festival and the 'Festival of Asia' in Melbourne, Australia.

Suryaprakash is both a concert performer and a teacher, much sought after. He has conducted several workshops for aspiring students.

Suryaprakash has composed thillanas ragamalikas krithis. He has composed lyrics and set musical score for three Australian dance productions.

== Awards ==
- Kalaimamani Award - 2018
- G. Ramanathan Award, Sri Parthasarathy Swami Sabha, Chennai, 2013
- Gana Kala Vipanchee, Padma Vibushan M. Balamuralikrishna, 2007
- Nada Chintamani, Chintamani Gayana Samaja, Chennai, 2007
- Best Vocalist, Madras Music Academy, Chennai, 2006
- Ganamrutha Sagara, Gana Mukundhapriya, Chennai, 2006
- Gambhira Gana Siromani, ABC, Sydney, 2005
- Best Vocalist, Madras Music Academy, Chennai, 2004
- Youth Excellence Award, Rotary Club of Madras, Chennai, 2004
- Ariyakudi Memorial Award, Sriragam Fine Arts, Chennai, 2004
- Nadachudhar, Nadabrahmam Music Journal, 2003
- Madhura Gana Tilaka, Indian Arts Academy, Melbourne, 2003
- Youth Excellence Award, Maharajapuram Viswanatha Iyer Trust, 2002
- Best Vivadhi Raga Exposition, Madras Music Academy, Chennai, 2001
- Yuva Kala Bharathi, Bharat Kalachar, Chennai, 1999
- Maharajapuram Sri Viswanatha Iyer Prize for Best Raga Alapana, Sri Krishna Gana Sabha, Chennai, 1996
- Best Vocalist, Indian Fine Arts Society, Chennai, 1995
- Best Vocalist, Sri Krishna Gana Sabha, Chennai, 1991

== Discography ==
- 1995 – one-hour recording, released by Kalavardhini. Accompaniment: V V Ravi and Thiruvarur Bhakthavatsalam.
- 1998 – one-hour recording, released by Kalavardhini. Accompaniment: V V Srinivasa Rao and Mannarkoil Balaji.
- 2000—CD and cassette titled "Shining Pearls of Swati Tirunal" by Carnatica. Accompaniment: Mullaivasal Chandramouli and Mannarkoil Balaji.
- 2004—CD and cassette titled "Legendary Melodies," consisting of classical hits of M. K. Thyagaraja Bhagavathar, S. G. Kittappa, M M Dandapani Desikar, M. L. Vasanthakumari, and others. Released by Purnima Records. Accompaniment: V Suresh Babu, Tanjore Murugabhoopathi, R Ganapathi, & N Sundar.
- 2005 – CD and cassette titled "Maestro's Popular Melodies". Released by Kosmic Music. Accompaniment: M A Krishnaswamy, Karukurichi Mohanram, and N Sundar.
- 2006—CD titled "Shanmatha Sunaadam of Dikshithar". Released by Purnima Records. Accompaniment: Vittal Ramamurthy, Srimushnam V. Raja Rao and Vaikom R Gopalakrishnan.
- 2007 – CD titled "Suryaprakash Live Concert – Bharat Sangeet Utsav 2007." Recorded and Released by Carnatica. Accompaniments: Nagai Sriram, Srimushnam V. Raja Rao and E. M. Subramaniam.
- 2009 – CD—Suryaprakash's first Tamil devotional twin album "Ethanai Kodi Inbam" and "Ananda Vilakku." Recorded and released by Guru Maharaji Trust, New Delhi.
- 2009 – CD titled "Consonance." Released by Purnima Records. Accompaniment: Raghavendra Rao, Tanjore Murugaboopathi, Murali
- 2009 – CD titled Sri Rush Kshetram Tamil kritis/ compositions of Neduntheevu Ponn Suhir on Sri Rajarajeswari Peetam, Rush, NY, USA rendered by Suryaprakash. Recorded and released by Swati Soft Solutions.
- 2010 – CD titled "Raagangale...Paadalgale.." Carnatic Double CD Album. Accompaniment: B Ananthakrishnan and S J Arjun Ganesh Released by Purnima Records.
- 2012 – CD titled "Madhura Gaanam". Carnatic album. Accompaniment: Nagai Sriram and Tanjore Murugaboopathi
