= Child borewell deaths in India =

In India, dozens of children have died by falling into abandoned borewells, which are generally narrow and deep. Currently there are 27 million borewells in India, with most of them in rural areas. After borewell dries up, its cover—made of cast iron—is removed with the PVC pipe being pulled out, exposing the hole.

Indian records show that between 2009 and 2019, there were roughly 40 child deaths in borewells. as many go unrecorded with the country having 27 million borewells. Borewell safety can be improved by filling the abandoned well with sand or clay.

== See also ==
- Death of Sujith Wilson
- 2006 borewell rescue of Prince Kumar
