= Desikan =

Desikan (Desika) is an Indian surname. Notable people with the surname include:

- Lakshmi Kumara Thathachariar (Lakshmi Kumara Thatha Desikan; 1456–1543), Hindu saint and guru
- Rahul Desikan, Indian-American neuroscientist
- Vedanta Desikan (1268–1369), Indian guru and philosopher
- Kothapalle Vedantha Desikan (1926–2022), Indian Leprologist
