= 2006 borewell rescue of Prince Kumar =

2006 Indian rescue of child from borewell

Coordinates: 30.2205865°N 76.8387818°E

- Date: July 21–23, 2006
- Location: Haldaheri, Kurukshetra district, Haryana, India
- Cause: Prince Kumar falling into uncovered borewell
- Outcome: 50-hour operation by Indian Army, resulting in Prince Kumar's safe rescue

In July 2006, Prince Kumar, a five-year-old boy, fell into a 60 feet (18 m) deep, narrow borewell in the village of Haldaheri, Kurukshetra district, Haryana. The rescue effort, which lasted nearly 50 hours, gained massive national media attention and involved the Indian Army.

== Incident ==
On 21 July 2006, Prince Kumar fell into an abandoned, uncovered borewell while playing. Villagers soon heard his cries from inside the well and discovered that he had fallen inside.

== Rescue operation ==
The shaft was approximately 1 foot (0.30 m) wide, making it impossible for an adult to descend and retrieve him.

Firefighters from Mumbai had been called to help with the rescue. After initial rescue attempts failed, the Indian Army was called to lead the rescue mission. As the boy tried to wriggle out by himself, he would slide down further by 10 feet, ultimately reaching the bottom of the borewell. There was also a concern that the borewell would collapse onto the boy. A closed-circuit camera was also lowered into the shaft to monitor his condition and well-being. During the operation, oxygen was pumped into the well, and food, milk and chocolates were lowered to the boy using a rope.

Engineers and soldiers used heavy machinery to dig a parallel pit adjacent to the borewell. They were helped by a dry well which was parallel to the borewell, which they then dug deeper. Once the parallel shaft reached the necessary depth, rescuers hand-dug a horizontal tunnel to connect the two pits.

Prince was successfully pulled out of the well on 23 July 2006 to widespread celebration across India. While the Army claims that a young officer named Captain Pankaj Upadhyay finally pulled Prince out, some reports suggest that he refused to come out until his uncle was sent down to retrieve him.

== Aftermath and legacy ==
The event was one of the first of its kind to be broadcast live on 24-hour news channels in India, leading to a "media circus" and nationwide prayers. Thousands sent in their wishes and prayers to the news channels. Following his rescue, the state government of Haryana announced that it would cover the costs of Prince's education and well-being.

Inspired by the soldiers who saved him, Prince Kumar expressed a desire in later years to join the Indian Army. The incident also prompted discussions regarding the safety of abandoned borewells in rural India.

== See also ==
- Child borewell deaths in India
