= Vinjamuri Venkata Lakshmi Narasimha Rao =

- Born: 1887; India
- Died: Unknown
- Occupation: Stage actor

Vinjamuri Venkata Lakshmi Narasimha Rao (born 1887, date of death unknown) was an Indian stage actor, Telugu-Sanskrit pandit and author.

He studied at Pithapuram. He was attracted to stage acting and played Graciana role in the Merchant of Venice at the age of 10 years. He got the attention of Head master Kuchi Narasimham.

He joined the drama company 'Kakinada Amateurs' in 1913 and played the role of Gaya in Gayopakhyanam. In the drama competitions of the same drama he received the first prize from Kurma Venkata Reddy Naidu. He used to play Dharmaraja in Pandava Vijayam. His favorite role was Bahuka in Chitranalineeyam of Dharmavaram. During the plays of Rasaputra vijayam, Pratarudriyam, Sarangadhara dramas in 1918 at Victoria Public Hall, they were appreciated by doyen of Indian drama Bellary Raghava.

== Family ==
He married Venkataratnamma, who launched and edited Anasuya, the first women's magazine in Telugu, featuring women writers and Ajanta style illustrations. Their daughter was named after the magazine. He has two daughters: Vinjamuri Seetha Devi and Vinjamuri Anasuya Devi. Devulapalli Krishna Sastry was his nephew.

== Awards ==
He received Padma Shri Award from Government of India in 1967.
