= V. V. Ravi =

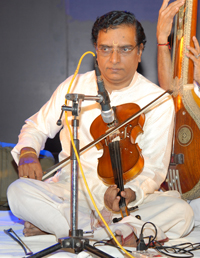
- V.V. Ravi at Violin Concert

Background information
- Origin: Vadakkenchery, Palakkad district, Kerala, India
- Instrument: Violin

Vadakkanchery Veeraraghava Bhagavathar Ravi is an Indian classical music violinist. As an enterprising instrumentalist and violinist he has conducted concerts along with his brother V. V. Subrahmaniam and toured several nations including Malaysia, Indonesia, Singapore, Hong Kong, Japan, U.S.A., Canada and England.

== Early life ==
V. V. Ravi was born to Vadakkanchery Veeraraghava Iyer, a vocalist and violin vidwan. He hails from a music family whose ancestry goes back to Swathi Thirunal.

His grandfather was a court musician of the Swathi Thirunal Sangeetha Sabha. V. V. Ravi was trained under his father at the age of 9 and later he got special training from renowned artistes like Chembai Vaidyanatha Bhagavatar, Semmangudi Srinivasa Iyer and P. S. Narayanaswamy.

As an instrumentalist, he performed with bygone legends like Chembai Vaidyanatha Bhagavatar, Semmangudi Srinivasa Iyer, M. S. Subbulakshmi, D. K. Pattammal, K. V. Narayanaswamy, M. D. Ramanathan, D. K. Jayaraman, Voleti Venkatesvarulu, S. Kalyanaraman, Sandhyavandanam Srinivasa Rao and M. L. Vasanthakumari.

== Career and honors ==
V. V. Ravi joined All India Radio in 1982 as a member of the Vadya Vrinda group.

He has been presented with several honours and awards including:

- The Best Violin Artiste by All India Radio in 1973.
- The best young violin artiste by Chennai Sangeetha Vidhvadh Sabha in 1976 and 1990.
- On the occasion of the 82nd birthday celebration of Dr. M. Balamuralikrishna on 29 July 2012, some 82 eminent artists and gurus of the Carnatic music world were honoured with Madhura Murali Puraskar award. V. V. Ravi received the award from Dr. Balamuralikrishna.
- He was conferred with "Nada Vallabha" honour by Nadasuda on 12 January 2014.
- He was conferred with Kerala Sangeetha Nataka Akademi Award award 2016 (Violin)

== Personal life ==
V. V. Ravi is married and has a son and a daughter. His wife Visalam Ravi is a singer, and a leading multilingual dubbing artiste. His son V.R. Raghava Krishna is also a Carnatic music vocalist.
