= Vijay Dev =

Indian political scientist

- Died: 11 April 2019; Pune
- Occupation: Professor
- Spouse: Veena Dev
- Children: Mrinal Kulkarni

VIjay Dev (died April 11, 2019) was a professor and principal in SP College, Pune in India. He was a writer, teacher, professor of political science and a speaker.

== Career ==
Dev was the principal of SP college, Pune from 2000 to 2002. He was also member of Tilak Maharashtra Vidyapeeth (TMV) as well as Savitribai Phule Pune University (SPPU)’s political study circle. He had doctorate and had presented several papers in various national seminars and also conducted workshops on socio-political subjects like national politics and democracy. Sajyadri and history were his recent topics of interest.

He was a figure in the field of political science and a member of the college community.

Dev was founder member and president of the Durgapremi mandal. This organisation was dedicated for forts.

== Books written ==
- राज्यजिज्ञासा - Rajyjidnyasa
- कौटिल्याच्या यथार्थ तुलनेत मॅकिएव्हेली - Koutilyachya yatarth tulanet Macievileli
- आत्मानुभूती (आत्मचिंतन) - Atmanubhuti
- आधुनिक भारतीय राजकीय विचारवंत - Aadhunik bharity rajkiy vicharvant
- आमचा योग वर्ग - Aamcha yog varg
- दुर्गचिंतन (संपादित) - Durgachintan
- दुर्गायात्रा (संपादित) - Durga yatra
- पाश्चात्त्य राजकीय विचारवंत (सहलेखक - डॉ. संज्योत आपटे, डॉ. शरद गोसावी) - Pashchaty rajkiy vicharvant
- राजकीय विश्लेषण कोश - Rajkiy vishleshan kosh
- राजकीय संकल्पना आणि सिद्धान्त (सहलेखक - डॉ. संज्योत आपटे, डॉ. शरद गोसावी) - Rajkiy sankalpana ani siddhant
- राज्यजिज्ञासा (स्पर्धा परीक्षेसाठी क्रमिक पुस्तक) - Rajyjidnyasa
- श्रीशिवछत्रपती : एक स्मरण - Shri Shivchatrapati
- सुबोध राज्यशास्त्र (क्रमिक पुस्तक) - Subodh Rajyashastra
- हृदयपालट - Hruday palat

== Death ==
Dev died on April 11, 2019, due to a heart attack. He was 78 years old. He is survived by his wife Veena Dev, an author, and two daughters, Mrinal Kulkarni, actor and Madhura Dev. Vijay Dev was son-in-law of well-known Marathi author G. N. Dandekar.
