= P. K. Dharmalingam =

Indian cricketer (1936–2019)

P. K. Dharmalingam (15 April 1936 – 2 June 2019) was an Indian cricketer. He played in 29 first class matches for Madras and Services between 1960 and 1970 with a batting average of 28.30 and a bowling average of 20.50.

He coached young cricketers in Chennai, claiming to have been the first to organise summer training camps there.

Played Ranji Trophy cricket for the Services Team and Madras Team from 1959 to 1971. Highest Score in Ranji trophy was 162 runs, while playing against Punjab for Services XI.

Played the Gopalan Trophy for Madras against Ceylon for 4 yrs.

Played for North Zone in Duleep Trophy.

Got Qualified as a Cricket Coach for various age group teams and Ranji Trophy team spanning over a period of 30 years from 1975 to 2005.

Had the distinction of being sponsored by Mr. N. Srinivasan of India Cements (current President of BCCI) and represented Jolly Rovers 1st Division cricket team of TNCA. Got nominated as a Coach by the Board of Control for Cricket in India for Central Zone for 4yrs. Had the privilege of coaching Mr.Sanjay Jagdale the present Honorary Secretary of BCCI when he represented MP in the Ranji Trophy. Was bestowed the responsibility of coaching the India A team at Mumbai which comprised upcoming players like Kapil Dev., Kiran More, Asharad Auyub, Shivalal Yadav, Kirti Azad, Baskar Pillai, and Pranab Roy etc., and thus had the privilege of being a tutelage for those players then.

Was the most sought after fielding Coach for Indian Cricket team whenever International matches were played at the Chennai- Chepauk ground.

Was the first cricketing coach for Bhilai Steel Plant who went on to win the prestigious Golden Steel Authority of India Trophy. Mr. Rajesh Chauhan of Bhilai Steel Plant then on went to represent India in the test matches.

The first to start a Cricket Academy in Chennai as Dharma's Cricket Academy in 1979. International Test Cricketers like K. Srikkanth, B. Arun, T. A. Sekar, L. Sivaramakrishnan, W.V. Raman, S. Sriram, Bharath Reddy etc., were coached by him in 1980s.

Enjoyed the distinction of coaching the Indian Women's Cricket team which had players like Shubhangi Kulkarni, Shantha Rangaswamy, Diana Edulji, and Poornima Rao.

Was the selector for Indian Women's Cricket team for many years.

Coach of the Tamil Nadu Women's Cricket Team for many years and players like Sudha Shah, Susan Itticheria, Fowzieh Khaleeli went on to play for India.

Current International Players like Ravichandran Ashwin, Abinav Mukund, Anirudha Srikkanth, and Dinesh Karthik gained test status under his tutelage.

During his tenure as a coach, Madras University team went on to win the Rohinton Baria Trophy. Tamil Nadu under 19 Team won the coveted Coach Behar Trophy during his tenure as their Coach. He served as a cricket consultant for some of the leading corporations like TVS, CTS, Bahwan Cybertek, Take Solutions, Inotics, Sumerusoft, Alumni Club of Anna University. Most of these corporations were in constant touch for developing their cricket team activities.
