= Nagai Sriram =

Indian Carnatic violinist (1980–2022)

- Born: 19 June 1980; Chennai, Tamil Nadu, India
- Died: 8 April 2022 (aged 41)
- Genres: Carnatic music
- Instrument: Violin
- Labels: Charsur, Kalakendra

Nagai Sriram (19 June 1980 – 8 April 2022) was an Indian Carnatic violinist.

== Career ==
Nagai Sriram was born in Chennai on 19 June 1980. He was introduced to the Carnatic violin at the age of 10 under his grandmother, R. Komalavalli. He received advanced training from his uncle Vidwan Kalaimaamani Nagai Muralidharan. All India Radio rates him as an A-grade artist, and he is also rated highly by Doordarshan Television.

Nagai Sriram commenced his career as a violinist at the age of 12 when he played for Neyveli Santhanagopalan in New Delhi. Since then, he has accompanied many leading artists including R. K. Srikantan, M. Balamuralikrishna, P. Unnikrishnan, T. N. Seshagopalan, T. V. Sankaranarayanan, O. S. Thyagarajan, K. V. Narayanaswamy, S. Sowmya, Hyderabad Brothers, Dr. N. Ramani, Sanjay Subrahmanyan, T. M. Krishna, Malladi brothers, and the Carnatica Brothers.

Nagai Sriram died on 8 April 2022 at the age of 41.

== Awards ==
Nagai Sriram has won many awards including:

- Sangeet Natak Akademi - Yuva Puraskar, 2014
- Shanmukha Sangeetha Sironmani - Shanmukhanandha Sabha, Mumbai - 2007
- Best Violinist - Music Academy Chennai - 2001 through 2008 (8 consecutive years)
- Best Violinist - Maharajapuram Vishwanatha Iyer Trust - 2004
- Yuvakalabharathi – Bharath Kalachar, Chennai - 2003

== 2018 controversy ==
In 2018 Madras Music Academy dropped Sriram and six other artists after allegations of misconduct surfaced, around the time as the beginnings of the #MeToo movement. The other artists who were removed were N. Ravikiran, O. S. Thyagarajan, Mannargudi A. Easwaran, Srimushnam V. Raja Rao, R. Ramesh, and Thiruvarur Vaidyanathan.

== See also ==
- List of Carnatic singers
