= Tapan Mitra =

American economist (1948–2019)

Tapan Mitra (18 July 1948 – 3 February 2019) was an American economist.

== Life and career ==
Tapan Mitra was born to parents Ashok and Santi Mitra. He was born in Calcutta on 18 July 1948. He attended St. Xavier's High School, Bombay, and Rajkumar College, Raipur. In 1968, Mitra graduated from the University of Calcutta with a degree in economics. He further studied the subject, completing a master's degree at Delhi University two years later. Mitra subsequently immigrated to the United States, where he obtained a second master's in economics, followed by a doctorate in the same subject at the University of Rochester in 1973 and 1975 respectively. He lectured at Rochester while working toward his Ph.D., joining the University of Illinois at Chicago in 1974 as an assistant professor. Mitra moved to the Stony Brook University in 1976, where he was later appointed associate professor. He began teaching at Cornell University in 1981 as full professor of economics. In 1997, Mitra was elected a fellow of the Econometric Society, and was named the Goldwin Smith Professor of Economics at Cornell in 2007. In 2016, Mitra endowed a set of prizes awarded by the Department of Economics.
