= Vinjamuri Anasuya Devi =

Indian folk music singer (1920–2019)

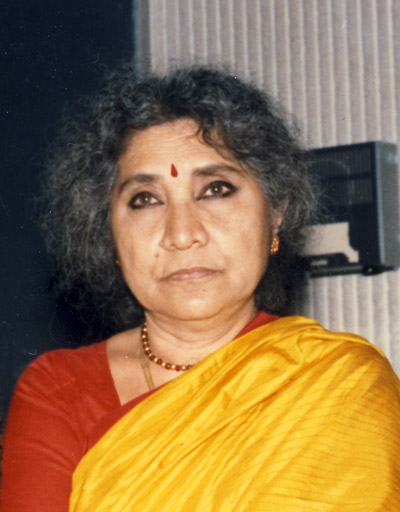
- Born: 12 May 1920; East Godavari district, Andhra Pradesh, British India
- Died: 23 March 2019 (aged 98)
- Occupations: Singer; harmonium player; music composer

Vinjamuri Anasuya Devi (May 12, 1920 – March 23, 2019) was a Telugu singer, harmonium player, music composer and author. Her forte was folk music and songs.

== Early life and background ==
She was the daughter of Vinjamuri Venkata Lakshmi Narasimha Rao, who was an Indian stage actor, Telugu-Sanskrit pandit and author. Vinjamuri Seetha Devi, also a Telugu singer, was her sister. Together they are called the Vinjamuri Sisters.

Her elder daughter Ratna Papa was a Kuchipudi dancer. Her second daughter Sita Ratnakar was the former producer in Dooradarsan Television, Chennai. She died on 2019, March 23 at 99 years of age in Houston.

== Writings ==
She published 7 volumes with lyrics and music notations.

She published 4 books including her autobiography Asamana Anasuya.

== Documentary ==
Her daughter, Seetha Ratnakar, made a documentary called Asamana Anasuya in 2024.
