= Pinaki Thakur =

Bengali poet (1959–2019)

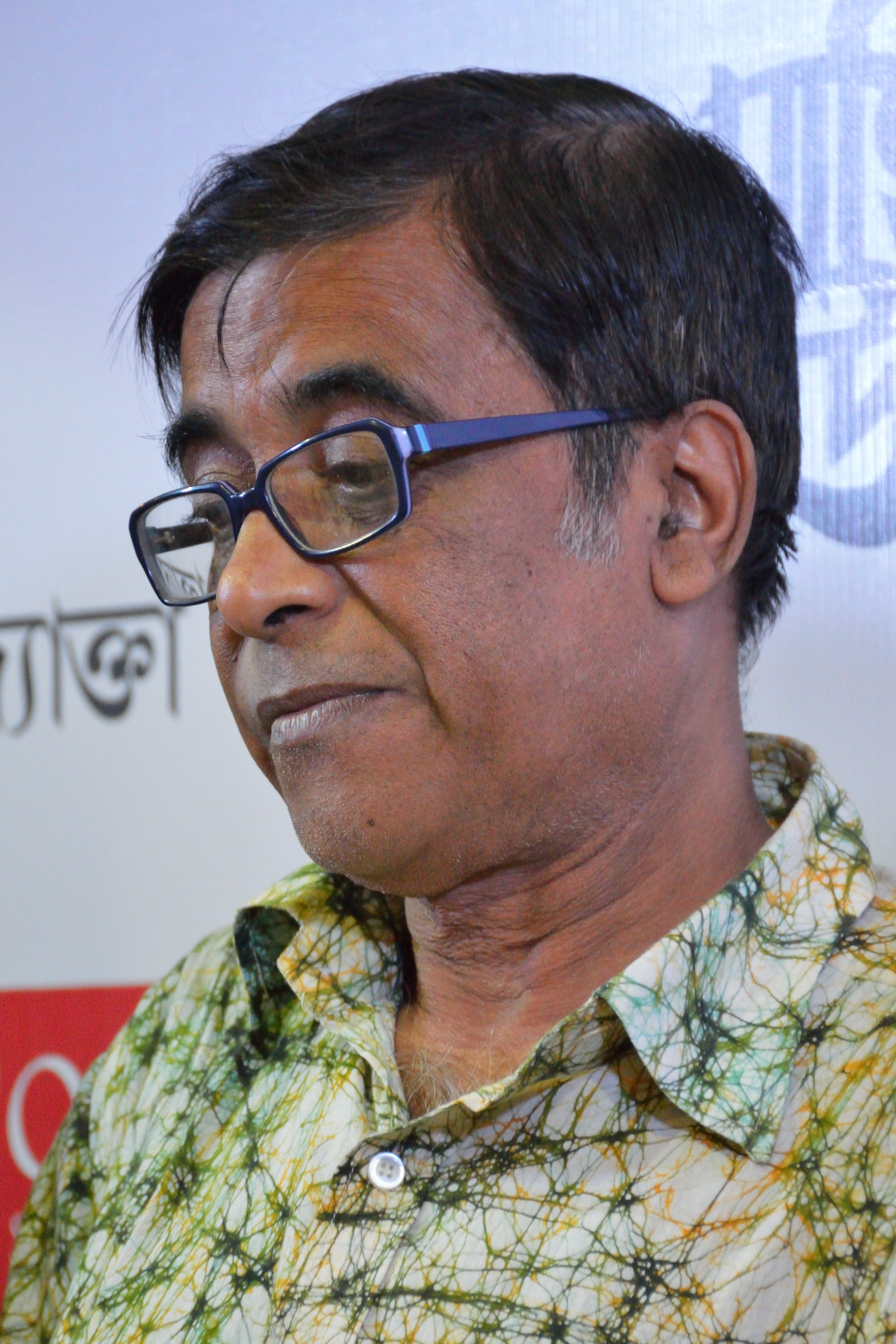
- Pinaki Thakur in Bengali Literary Festival at Oxford Bookstore in 2015
- Born: 21 April 1959; Bansberia, Hooghly District, West Bengal, India
- Died: 3 January 2019 (aged 59); Kolkata, West Bengal, India
- Occupation: Poet
- Writing career
- Language: Bengali
- Notable work: Chumbaner Kkhato
- Notable awards: Ananda Puraskar (2012); Bangla Akademi Award (West Bengal)

Pinaki Thakur (21 April 1959 – 3 January 2019) was a Bengali poet

== Biography ==
Thakur was born in 1959 at Bansberia, Hooghly district in the Indian state of West Bengal. He studied Engineering but was passionate in Bengali poetry from student life and wrote poems in various little magazines. His poetry was first published in Ushinar magazine in 1974. In 1979 Thakur's poetry was published in Desh magazine. He became popular in Bengali literary field after publishing his first book Ekdin Ashoriri. Thakur was conferred the Ananda Puraskar in 2012 for his book Chumbaner Kkhato. He was also awarded by Paschimbanga Bangla Akademi Puraskar and Krittibas Purashkar. He was suffering from cerebral malaria since December 2018 and died on 3 January 2019 in SSKM Hospital, Kolkata at the age of 59.

== Books ==
- Ekdin Ashoriri
- Ha Re Shaswata
- Anke Joto Shunyo Pele
- Chumbaner Kkhato
- Amara Roilam
- Sharir Kancher Tukro
- Basanta Mastan
- Nishiddho Ek Ganer Moto
- Mausam
- Kalanka Rachana
- Akal Basanta
- Kabita Samgra
