= Damodar Ganesh Bapat =

Indian social worker (1935/36–2019)

- Born: 1934 or 1935; Pathrot, Maharashtra, British India
- Died: 17 August 2019 (aged 83–84); Chhattisgarh, India
- Citizenship: Indian
- Occupation: social worker
- Organization: Bhartiya Kushta Nivarak Sangh
- Awards: Padma Shri

Damodar Ganesh Bapat (1934 or 1935 – 17 August 2019) was an Indian social worker known for his service to the leprosy patients at Bhartiya Kushta Nivarak Sangh (BKNS) in Janjgir–Champa district, Chhattisgarh, India. In 2018, the Government of India awarded him the Padma Shri, India's fourth highest civilian award, in recognition of his social work.

== Early life and education ==
Bapat was born in the Pathrot village in Amravati district in Maharashtra, India in 1934 or 1935. He completed his Bachelor of Arts and Bachelor of Commerce degrees from Nagpur. After completing his studies, he worked at several places. He was not happy with his jobs and was interested in social work. The writings of Swami Vivekanand inspired Bapat, and in the early 1970s he joined Balasaheb Deshpande's work with the Vanvasi Kalyan Ashram. His association with the RSS as a pracharak began in 1971.

== Social work ==
In 1970, he moved to Jashpur, in Chhattisgarh, and started volunteering with Vanvasi Kalyan Ashram which works in rural areas in India. Initially, he worked there as a teacher for the tribal children. While teaching he also met leprosy patients and remained there to serve them throughout his life.

He came in contact with Sadashiv Katre, who had founded a community in 1962 named Bharatiya Kushtha Nivarak Sangh (BKNS) in the village of Sothi, located 8 kilometres (5 mi) from Champa, to care for leprosy patients. Bapat, along with Katre, worked together to cure the leprosy patients as well as their social and financial rehabilitation. In 1975, Bapat was appointed the secretary of Bharatiya Kushtha Nivarak Sangh, and its growth thereafter is credited to him. From 1972 until his death in 2019, he served leprosy patients. He also worked to improve public awareness about leprosy. Dainik Jagran reported in 2019 that he had improved the lives of an estimated 26,000 leprosy patients.

== Awards ==
In 2018, the Government of India awarded him the Padma Shri in recognition of his social work. On 12 September 2006, he was awarded the Devi Ahilyabai National Award.

== Death ==
In July 2019, Bapat suffered a brain hemorrhage after which he was admitted to a Hospital in Bilaspur. He died on 17 August 2019 at 2:35 a.m. at a hospital in Chhattisgarh at the age of 84 years. He donated his body to Chhattisgarh Institute of Medical Sciences, Bilaspur for research purposes.

The Governor of Chhattisgarh, Anusuiya Uikey and Chief Minister Bhupesh Baghel condoled his death appreciating his work in serving leprosy patients.
