= Death of Sujith Wilson =

2019 death of a boy who fell in a borewell

Sujith Wilson (7 October 2017 – 26 October 2019) was a two-year-old who died on 26 October 2019 after falling into an abandoned deep bore well by his house in Nadukattupatti, a village near Trichy (a town in the Indian state of Tamil Nadu). He fell into the borewell on 25 October 2019 at around 5:45 pm while his mother was attending his elder brother. The rescue operations commenced on 25 October 2019 around 8:00 pm, and continued for more than 80 hours. The rescue operation was affected by rain. The operations to rescue Sujith went viral across the country as prayers were conducted for the rescue operations of the boy. Around 2:00 am, 30 October 2019 officials confirmed the death of the boy, and the last rites were held six hours later. Following the sensitive and tragic aspect of the two-year-old boy's incident, politicians and celebrities across India paid tribute and offered their condolences for Sujith Wilson.

== Development ==
Sujith fell into the deep bore well on 25 October 2019 at around 5.45 in the evening and was initially stuck at 30 ft but then fell deep to about 88 ft. A constant supply of oxygen was given to the child to help his survival in the deep underground environment with traces of oxygen.

A wider tube-well was drilled for over two days in order to rescue the child since initial efforts to save the child from the existing bore hole failed. The officials also felt difficulties to assess the condition of the boy due to covering of mud. Nearly 550 rescue operators were involved in this rescue operation.

The whole incident went viral across all social media platforms and led to the development of hashtags such as #PrayforSujith and #SujithWilson went viral on Twitter in support of the rescue operations.

== Death ==
The rescue operation was put on hold in late night on 28 October 2019 after detecting the odor of decomposition at the top of the bore well. The officials initially speculated that the boy might have been dead. The following day, it was officially announced that Sujith was dead and the decomposing body was recovered around 2 am.

== Response ==
M. K. Stalin, leader of DMK, tweeted his tributes and condolences to the child's family and criticised the Tamil Nadu government for the drawbacks and shortcomings regarding the failure of the rescue operations. Sujith's death was also mourned in Sri Lanka as few local leading newspapers such as The Daily Mirror depicted the tragedy of Sujith Wilson as the main headlines by adding "The rescue mission to save toddler".

Several film actors and actresses paid tribute to the child in social media such as Rajinikanth, Vivek, Samantha Akkineni, Udhayanidhi Stalin and Vikram Prabhu Politicians including Indian Prime Minister Narendra Modi, Rahul Gandhi and cricketers Ravichandran Ashwin, Harbhajan Singh also poured in condolences to the child.

== Funeral ==
His body was buried at the Fathima Pudur Burial Grounds in Malaiyadhipathi on 29 October 2019 at 8 am.

== See also ==
- 2019 in India
