= Thuppettan =

Malayalam-language playwright from Kerala (1929–2019)

M. Subrahmanyan Namboothiri
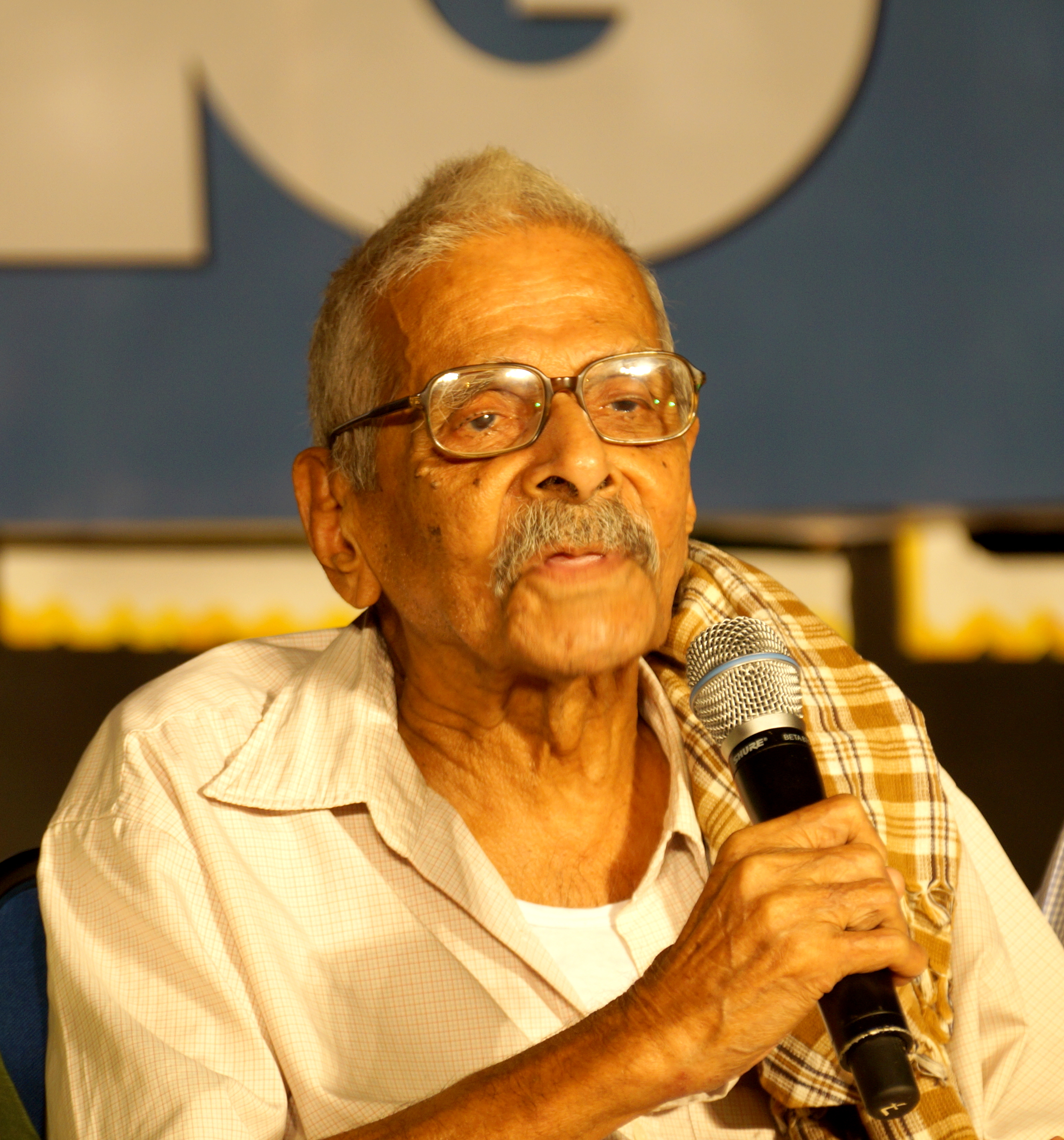
- Thuppettan
- Born: 1 March 1929; Panjal, Thrissur, Kerala
- Died: 1 February 2019 (aged 89); Thrissur
- Occupations: Play Writer, Drawing Teacher, Painter, Vedic Scholar
- Spouse: Umadevi
- Children: Suma; Savithri; Ajitha, Ravi; Raman

M. Subramanian Namboodiri (1 March 1929 – 1 February 2019), commonly known by his pen name Thuppettan, was a Malayalam-language playwright from Kerala, India. Hailing from Panjal, a village in Thrissur district of Kerala, Thuppettan had been a drawing teacher at a local school. His father Ittiravi Namboodiri was a Vedic scholar who tried to reform the conservative practices of the Namboodiri community.

Some of the most famous works of Thuppettan include Thanathu Lavanam, Marumarunnu, Vettakkarappayal, Swaapaharanam Athava Ellarum Argentinayilekku, Bhadrayanam, Kalavastha, Mohanasundarapaalam, Double Act and Chakka. He won the Kerala Sahitya Akademi Award in 2003 for Vannanthye Kaanam, a collection of 10 short and hilarious plays.
