= Karvy Corporate =

Indian financial services company

Karvy Group
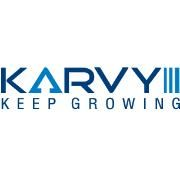
- Type: Private
- Industry: Financial services
- Founded: 1983; 43 years ago
- Headquarters: Hyderabad, Telangana, India
- Area served: India
- Key people: C. Parthasarathy (Chairman and Managing Director); M. Yugandhar (Managing Director); M. S. Ramakrishna (Director)
- Website: www.karvy.com www.karvyinvestmentbanking.com

Karvy Group is a financial services company headquartered in Hyderabad, India. It was involved in financial services like equity, commodities trading, depository and wealth services and distribution of other financial products. It also had branch offices outside India in Bahrain, Dubai, Malaysia, Philippines and the United States.

Scams perpetrated during 2019 involving Karvy Stock Broking Limited (KSBL), a group company led to the filing of criminal cases against the Chairman and others. This led to the banning of KSBL by the regulator.

== History ==
Karvy Group was established in the year 1983 and was headed by C. Parthasarathy, who served as its Chairman. The group at one time had more than 30,000 employees, spanning 900 offices in about 400 cities and towns. In the mid-1990s, Karvy forayed into stockbroking and advisory businesses. Later, in the early 2000s, Karvy Corporate ventured into commodity trading. With the introduction of currency trading, Karvy Corporate was also in the business of Forex trading.

== Business ==
Karvy Group provided financial services like finance, insurance, broking, investment banking, loans for individuals and businesses. Karvy started its ecommerce business on Karvyclick.com to enable small and medium enterprises to go online for selling their products in various eCommerce platforms.

Karvy Data Management Services, a subsidiary of Karvy Group, has acquired the call center business of Media Matrix Worldwide Ltd for Rs 30 crore in 2017.

Karvy Group has following nineteen subsidiary companies under it.

- Karvy Stock Broking Ltd. (KSBL)- Equity Broking, Depository Participant, Distribution of Financial Products (Mutual Funds, FD and Bonds), Wealth Management Services, Currency Derivatives, Portfolio Management Services
- Karvy Comtrade Ltd. - Commodities Broking
- Karvy Capital Ltd. - NBFC & Portfolio Manager
- Karvy Investment Advisory Services Ltd. - Investment Advisory Services
- Karvy Holdings Ltd. - Core Investment Company
- Karvy Middle East LLC - Wealth Management Products for NRI’s
- Karvy Realty (India) Ltd. - Realty Services
- Karvy Financial Services Ltd. - Non Banking Financial Services
- Karvy Insurance Repository Ltd. - Insurance Repository services
- Karvy Forex & Currencies Private Ltd. - Currency and forex services
- Karvy Consultants Ltd. - Consultancy and Advisory Services, Publications
- Karvy Data Management Services Ltd. - Data Management Services
- Karvy Investor Services Ltd. - Merchant Banking and Corporate Finance
- Karvy Insights Ltd. - Market Research
- Karvy Analytics Ltd. - Analytics
- Karvy Solar Power Ltd. - Power Generation
- Karvy Global Services Ltd. - Business Process Outsourcing
- Karvy Global Services Inc, USA - Business Process Outsourcing
- Karvy Inc, USA

=== Divested companies ===
- Karvy FinTech (name changed to KFinTech after divesting), Incorporated in 1978, and started operation in 1984 as a Fintech company for providing digital mutual fund services.
- Karvy Data Management Services Limited and its subsidiaries have officially been taken over by Sangamam Power Projects through the resolution process under the National Company Law Tribunal (NCLT) in December 2024. This acquisition is part of the approved resolution plan aimed at ensuring the revival of the business operations and safeguarding the interests of all stakeholders involved. With this development, the management and ownership of Karvy Data Management Services Limited have transitioned to Sangamam Power Projects, which will oversee the future course of the company’s operations. Stakeholders and the public are advised to take note of this change in ownership

== Criminal cases involving Karvy group companies ==
In November 2019, Securities and Exchange Board of India barred Karvy Stock Broking Limited (KSBL) from purchasing shares in delivery and also accepting new clients pending a forensic audit. SEBI found out that Karvy had defaulted Rs. 2000 crore of investor funds by pledging the securities holdings of its customers. The action was based on a detailed report by National Stock Exchange. The company had sold excess securities (not available in their DP account) worth Rs 485 crore through nine related clients till 31 May 2019. They further transferred excess securities worth Rs 162 crore to six of the nine related clients until 31 May 2019. Later, it tried to repurchase the securities worth 228.07 crores to cover up for the shortfall between June - September 2019. An amount of 1096 crore was transferred to its group concern Karvy Realty Private Limited during the period of April 2016 - October 2019.

In related investigation, Enforcement Directorate arrested C. Parthasarathy on 27 Jan 2022. They were released on bail subsequently.

On 25 November 2022, a fresh criminal case was registered against C. Parthasarathy, the Chairman of Karvy Reality (India) Private Limited for cheating few investors from Kolkata and Kerala by engaging to sell plots in 2019, in an old real estate venture of 2009.
