= V. R. Raghava Krishna =

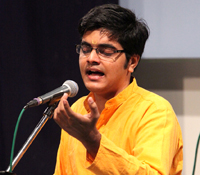

Background information
- Also known as: Raghav
- Born: 19 June 1987 (age 39); Chennai, India
- Genres: Indian classical music
- Occupations: Professional Animator and Carnatic Vocalist
- Years active: 1997–present

V.R. Raghava Krishna (born 1987) is a Carnatic music vocalist from Chennai, India.

He performed a recital with a Madhuvanti Tillana of Shanmugha Raghavan with swarakshara prayogas.

In September 2013 at his concert, featured by Nadabrahma Gana Sabha in Vanaprastha, Coimbatore, the graphic presentations revealed how he internalised the inner core and fertilised it by intense saadhakam (the way of learning, practising and mastering Carnatic Music).

== Other activities ==
Krishna has worked as a professional animator and a magician. He learnt 3D Animation & Visual Effects from Vancouver Film School, Canada. He worked with the animation department of the video game Batman: Arkham Origins.
