= E. M. Subramaniam =

- Born: 1947 or 1948; India
- Died: 23 April 2015
- Genre: Carnatic
- Occupation: percussionist
- Instrument: Ghatam

E. M. Subramaniam (died 23 April 2015) was an Indian Carnatic classical percussionist. Subramaniam was instructed in ghatam under the tutelage of his father. He has accompanied master percussionists including mridangam players such as Palghat Mani Iyer, Umayalpuram K. Sivaraman, and T. K. Murthy, and tabla players such as Alla Rakha Khan, Kishan Maharaj, and Zakir Hussain. He has been a grade A ghatam artist of All India Radio for the past 40 years. Subramaniam was awarded the title of "Kalaimamani" in 2000 and recognized with a Sangeet Natak Akademi Award in ghatam in 2011. His style of playing is compact with great tonal quality. E.M. Subramaniam has worked as a professor in Tamil Nadu Government music college (Adyar). He died on 23 April 2015.
