= Surya Prakash (artist) =

Indian artist (1940–2019)

- Born: 1940; Madhira, Hyderabad State, British India
- Died: 22 May 2019 (aged 78–79); Hyderabad, Telangana, India

Surya Prakash (1940 – May 22, 2019) was an Indian artist. An artist from Telangana state, he has earned a national and international reputation in oil, acrylic, and abstract paintings.
