= Rahul Desikan =

Indian-American neuroscientist and neuroradiologist (1978–2019)

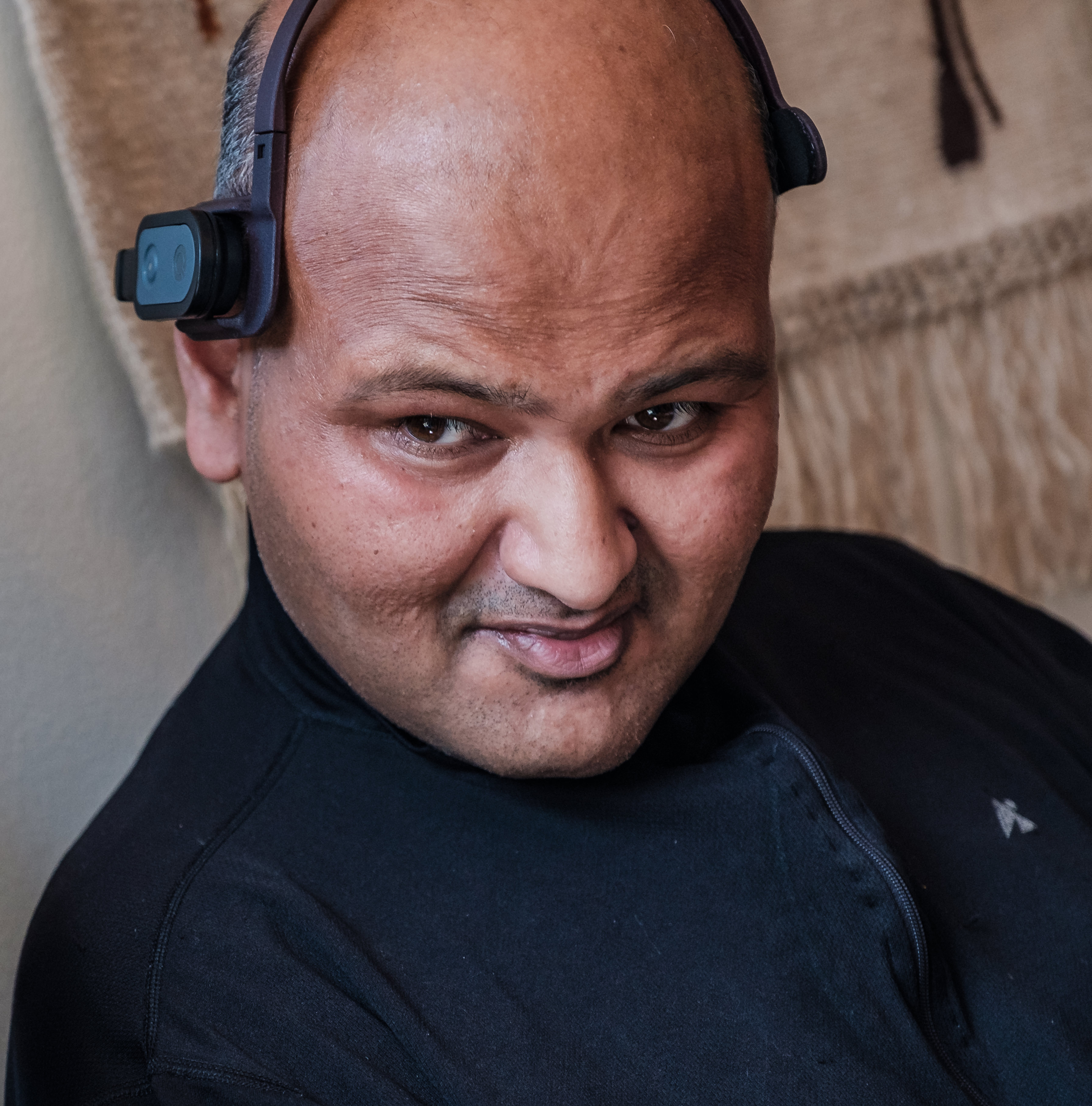
Rahul Desikan in 2018.

Rahul Desikan (June 6, 1978 – July 14, 2019) was an Indian-American neuroscientist and neuroradiologist. He was an assistant professor of Radiology & Biomedical Imaging, Neurology and Pediatrics at the University of California, San Francisco, and co-director of Laboratory for Precision Neuroimaging. Desikan's achievements became publicly known in a Washington Post article detailing his lifelong commitment to preventing and treating Alzheimer's disease and his continuing work as a scientist living with Amyotrophic lateral sclerosis (ALS). Desikan was vocal about the need for increased awareness and research funding for ALS, and voiced his unique perspective as both ALS researcher and ALS patient in op-ed articles appearing in a regular column in the Washington Post as well as in the San Francisco Chronicle and Scientific American.

== Education and early influences ==
Desikan graduated from The Bronx High School of Science, a school for gifted students, in 1995. Desikan completed his BA, MD and PhD training at Boston University, Radiology Residency at UCSD and Neuroradiology Fellowship at UCSF. He completed postdoctoral fellowships in Neuroimaging with Bruce Fischl at the Athinoula A. Martinos Center for Biomedical Imaging at Massachusetts General Hospital and Neurogenetics with Anders Dale at UCSD.

== Research on neurodegenerative disease ==
Desikan's work focused on investigating the pathobiology underlying neurodegenerative and neurodevelopmental disorders. Using 'big data' acquired through ongoing global collaborations, he innovated a variety of cross disciplinary methods to identify novel risk factors for brain diseases.

== Scientific contributions ==
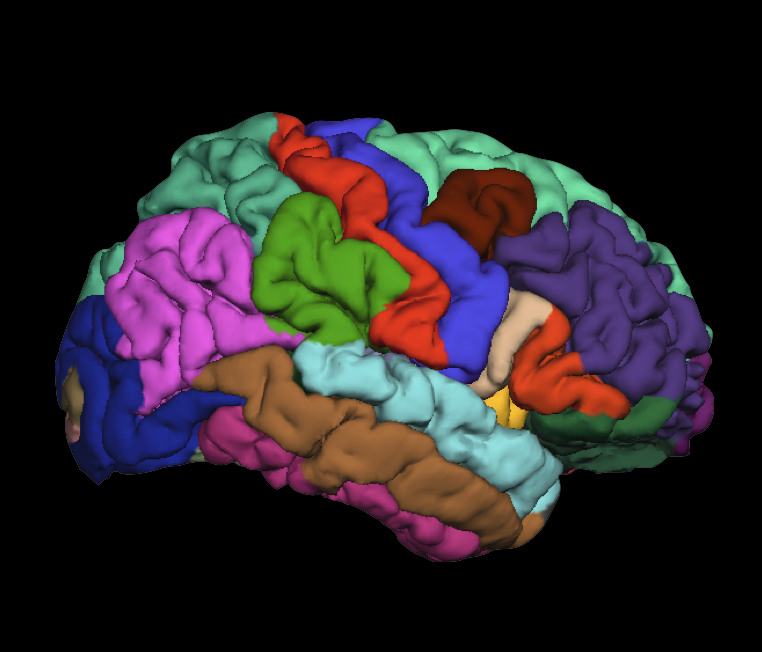
The Desikan-Killiany Atlas (Desikan et al., 2006) is a 35 area cortical atlas that is based on gyral morphology.

Regions of the Desikan-Killiany atlas.

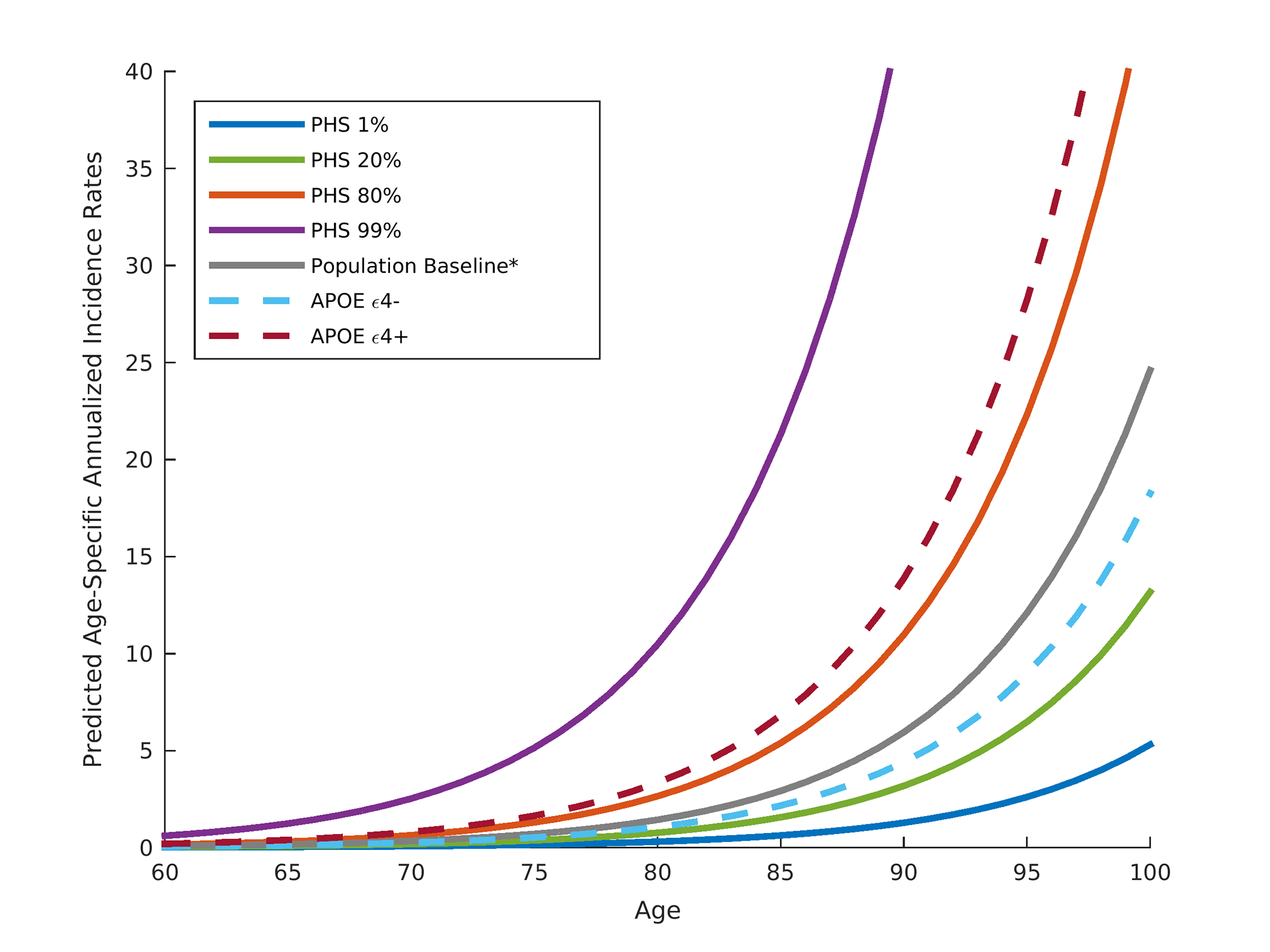
Polygenic hazard score (PHS) for predicting Alzheimer's disease age of onset.

Desikan's scientific career focused on helping to understand and treat neurodegenerative diseases, specifically Alzheimer's disease. His major scientific contributions included:

1) Development of an automated atlas of the human cerebral cortex (Desikan-Killiany Atlas in FreeSurfer), and its role as a quantitative biomarker for neurodegeneration in Alzheimer's disease.

2) Characterization of the synergistic relationship between amyloid and tau pathology in Alzheimer's disease.

3) Development of the polygenic hazard score (PHS) for predicting Alzheimer's disease age of onset, in collaboration with Chun Chieh Fan and Anders Dale. A commercial version of PHS, which calculates genetic risk for an individual using genomic data from 23andme and Ancestry.com, is available from Dash Genomics.

4) Helping develop and validate methods to quantify genetic pleiotropy. These genetic pleiotropy methods have provided valuable insights across a number of diseases and identified Novel Single Nucleotide Polymorphisms (SNPs) associated with increased risk for schizophrenia, bipolar disorder, Alzheimer's disease, Parkinson's disease, frontotemporal dementia, corticobasal degeneration, hypertension, hypercholesterolemia and coronary artery disease.

== ALS diagnosis ==
In February 2017, Desikan was diagnosed with amyotrophic lateral sclerosis, one of the Neurodegenerative Diseases that has been the focus of his research. His battle with the disease, both personal and scientific, was featured in The Washington Post, in a cover story by reporter Laurie McGinley. Unable to speak, walk or use his hands, Desikan continued to pursue research and published more than 25 papers after his diagnosis. His final work focused on development of a cardiovascular PHS for Alzheimer's disease and characterizing the genetic architecture of ALS. The ALS Association featured his unique story and groundbreaking work in a 2018 article. Boston University's Bostonia magazine featured Desikan in a 2018 article. Desikan's story was also featured as a cover story on American Broadcasting Company's Good Morning America on Friday, November 23, 2018. He died on July 14, 2019, two and a half years after being diagnosed with a rapidly-progressive form of ALS.

== Music ==
Desikan was an amateur musician and DJ. Even after the ALS diagnosis, Desikan created and recorded mixes, mainly using Native Instrument's Traktor software, with a motion capture system attached to himself. Desikan's mixes and live recordings are published on his SoundCloud page under the alias Rahul Quila.

== Awards ==
- 2011 Top Cited Article from 2006 to 2010, NeuroImage
- 2012 Cornelius G. Dyke Memorial Award
- 2016 Boerger Research Fund for Alzheimer's Disease and Neurocognitive Disorders
- 2016–2017 Junior Investigator Award, National Alzheimer's Coordinating Center
- 2017 Outstanding Fellow / Clinical Instructor Teaching Award, UCSF Department of Radiology and Biomedical Imaging
- 2017–2019 Alzheimer's Neuroimaging Award, ASNR Foundation
