= Vinjamuri Seetha Devi =

Musical artist (?-2016)

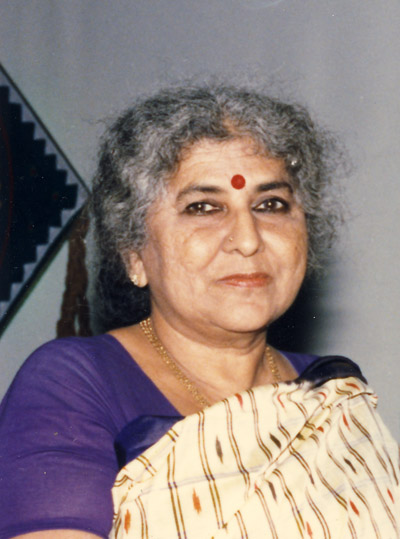

Background information
- Born: Kakinada, Andhra Pradesh, India
- Died: 17 May 2016 United States
- Genre: Telugu folk music

Vinjamuri Seetha Devi (died 17 May 2016) was a musician, singer, and scholar of Telugu folk music.

== Life ==
Devi was a producer of folk music on All India Radio.

Along with her sister Vinjamuri Anasuya Devi they composed music for many of Andhra Pradesh's notable poets. These include Srirangam Srinivisa Rao (Sri Sri).

She contributed music for the 1979 film Maa Bhoomi. She wrote "Folk Music of Andhra Pradesh". She died on 17 May 2016 in the United States of America.
