= 2024 Rajkot gaming zone fire =

Gaming zone fire in Rajkot

- Still from a video showing the fire
- Date: 25 May 2024
- Location: Rajkot, India; 22°16′22″N 70°45′57″E
- Type: Building fire
- Deaths: 32
- Injuries: 9

On 25 May 2024, a fire broke out at a gaming zone in Rajkot, Gujarat, India, killing 32 people.

== Background ==
The gaming zone was built in 2024 in temporary structures that had tin roofs and two floors. There were insufficient fire extinguishers and emergency exits in the buildings according to reports. The building also did not possess the required certification from the fire department.

== Incident ==
The fire was reportedly caused when sparks from welding fell onto a pile of plastic. There was only one exit in the first floor. Nearly 2,000 L (530 US gal) of diesel was stored at the TRP Game Zone for generators, while 1,000 to 1,500 L (260 to 400 US gal) of petrol was stored for go-kart racing, which made the fire almost uncontrollable. There were around 70 to 80 people present at the time of fire.

The fire resulted in the deaths of 32 people, including nine children.

== Investigation ==
The government of Gujarat formed a Special Investigation Team (SIT) to investigate the fire incident. The SIT, led by Additional Director General of Police Subhash Trivedi, was tasked with submitting a report within 72 hours and commenced its inquiry promptly upon arrival in Rajkot. Initial investigations revealed that the fire originated from sparks during welding work, which ignited flammable materials stored nearby. The gaming zone was operating without the necessary fire safety permits and lacked adequate emergency exits.

A First Information Report (FIR) was filed against six partners of the gaming zone on charges of culpable homicide not amounting to murder. Subsequently, the owner and manager were arrested, and FIRs were registered against six employees. As the investigation progressed, the number of accused increased to 11, with nine individuals arrested. One of the accused, Prakash Hiran, was killed in the fire. The Gujarat High Court took suo motu cognizance of the incident, describing it as a "man-made disaster." The court observed that such gaming zones and recreational facilities had been established without requisite approvals from competent authorities. It directed municipal corporations to provide information on the legal provisions under which these establishments were permitted to operate.

In response to the incident, the Gujarat government suspended nine officials, including the Chief Fire Officer and other municipal personnel, citing gross negligence in allowing the gaming zone to operate without necessary approvals. Additionally, four government officials, including town planning officers and a former fire station officer, were arrested in connection with the tragedy.

== Aftermath ==
Following the incident, the Gujarat DGP instructed all gaming zones in the state to be inspected and close those operating without fire safety permits. It also directed police to conduct the procedure in coordination with municipal fire officers.

The Chief Minister of Gujarat Bhupendra Patel announced an ex gratia of ₹400,000 (US$4,200) to the kin of each of the dead and ₹50,000 (US$520) to each injured. He also visited the scene of the fire and met with victims of the disaster in hospital. Prime Minister Narendra Modi expressed condolences and prayers for the victims. Prime Minister Narendra Modi expressed his condolences, stating on X that he was "extremely distressed" by the disaster. He also announced an ex gratia of ₹2 lakh (US$2,100) from the Prime Minister’s National Relief Fund for the next of kin of each deceased and ₹50,000 (US$520) for the injured.

== See also ==
- 2020 Vijayawada fire
- Bangalore circus fire
- 2023 Kohima fire
- 2013 Kolkata market fire
- 2019 Surat fire
- Delhi hotel fire
- Kamala Mills fire
- Srirangam marriage hall fire
- Uphaar Cinema fire
- 2006 Kolkata leather factory fire
