= Kamala Mills fire =

2017 disaster in India

Kamala Mills Fire
- Date: 28-29 December 2017
- Time: 0022hrs
- Location: Kamala Mills Compound, Lower Parel, Mumbai, Maharashtra, India; 19.003690°N 72.827539°E
- Cause: Fire
- Deaths: 14

On 29 December 2017, a fire broke out at Kamala Mills, a commercial complex in Lower Parel, Mumbai, at 00:22 IST. The fire resulted in the deaths of 14 people, and injuries to 55 more. The fire began in a bar, 1 Above, and spread to an adjacent pub, Mojo's Bistro, before spreading through the rest of the building in which they were housed.

== Background ==
Kamala Mills is a commercial complex located in Lower Parel, Mumbai, and houses 34 restaurants and bars in addition to several commercial offices. It is one of several former mill areas that are being redeveloped for commercial use in the city.

Two restaurants located in the upper floors of the Trade Housing Building, 1 Above and Mojo's Pub, had been licensed by the Municipal Corporation of Greater Mumbai to use one-third of the rooftop space, with the remaining two-thirds to be reserved as an open area. Both restaurants constructed illegal temporary structures over the entire rooftop space, with canopies, to provide additional space for serving food and drinks.

The restaurant 1 Above, was served notices by the Greater Mumbai Municipal Corporation of India on August 4, September 22 and October 27, 2017, for using the rooftop to serve drinks and food without permission. In August, some temporary construction on the rooftop by 1 Above was demolished by the Municipal Corporation of Greater Mumbai, as it had been constructed illegally. In October, the MCGM found that the same space was still being used illegally, and confiscated furniture that had been placed on the rooftop.

Both Mojo's Pub and 1 Above had also been served notices for illegally serving hookahs, a device used to vaporise and inhale substances such as flavoured tobacco or cannabis, by heating them up with charcoal.

== Fire ==
=== Initial fire ===
The fire began at 00:22 IST on 29 December 2017, in a bar called 1 Above, which was located on the rooftop of the three-storey Trade House Building in the Kamala Mills Compound. The fire spread to a bamboo canopy constructed over the rooftop eating area, and spread from there to the adjacent Mojo's Pub, which was separated from 1 Above by a partition. Both, 1 Above and Mojo's Pub were located along one arm of the L-shaped building; from these two places, the fire spread along the other arm, damaging the offices of five media offices also located on the rooftop. The entire upper part of the building was engulfed in fire in about 30 minutes.

There were approximately 200 people inside the building when the fire began. Access to the roof top consisted of one narrow staircase which led to an elevator. A door on the terrace remained locked through the incident. As the fire burned, the rooftop collapsed, and parts which were made of combustible materials caught fire. This caused difficulties for the persons trying to escape the fire, as well as limited access for fire fighters. Several people who were not able to exit the rooftop attempted to take shelter in a washroom located on the rooftop.

The collapsed roof damaged the exits of the offices of a news channel, TV9 Marathi, which was located on the floor below 1 Above.

=== Firefighting response ===
Emergency services were contacted about the fire at 12:30 IST. The Mumbai Fire Brigade responded to the fire, with eight fire tenders, and five water tankers, along with several ambulances. The fire was brought under control by 2:45 IST and was doused completely by 6:30 a.m. The Mumbai Fire Brigade initially classed the fire as Level II, but later upgraded their classification to Level III. Some people were able to escape to a nearby lobby, and were rescued by fire fighters using ladders to access the top of the lobby.

== Impact ==
=== Deaths ===
The fire caused the deaths of 14 persons, most of whom were at Mojo's Pub or 1 Above when it began. Thirteen were found dead on the scene of the fire, and one person died in the hospital of injuries relating to carbon monoxide inhalation. All 14 were located by firefighters, trapped inside washroom stalls, without any burn injuries, suggesting that the deaths were due to smoke inhalation. The injured and dead were taken to K.E.M. Hospital and Lokmanya Tilak General Hospital. Post-mortem reports confirmed that all 14 deaths were the result of asphyxiation. A deputy fire officer of the Mumbai Fire Brigade confirmed, based on eye witness reports, that several of those who died had attempted to lock themselves into the washrooms on the rooftop to escape the fire.

=== Damage to property ===
The fire affected transmission of many television channels as several media companies had their broadcasting office in the compound. Times Now, Mirror Now and ET Now resumed transmission while Movies Now, Movies Now HD, MNX HD, MN+ HD, MNX, Romedy Now, Romedy Now HD and Zoom channels were not transmitting due to major infrastructure losses.

== Aftermath ==
=== Technical investigation by the Mumbai Fire Brigade ===
A technical investigation was conducted by the Mumbai Fire Brigade, to establish the causes of the fire. The Mumbai Fire Brigade released its technical investigation report on 5 January 2018. The report examined evidence from the scene of the fire, as well as examining eyewitness accounts from survivors to establish the cause and spread of the fire.

Initial reports suggested the fire broke out in a rooftop restobar, 1 Above, and rapidly spread to next door pub Mojo's Bistro, and may have been caused by a short circuit. Initial statements from the Mumbai Police also indicated that 1 Above did not have permission to function on the roof top, and had illegally constructed several structures there, including a toilet. The Mumbai Fire Brigade also made initial statements, confirmed that 1 Above and Mojo's Pub did not have a fire exits on the rooftop or fire fighting equipment, such as fire extinguishers.

The technical investigation conducted by the Mumbai Fire Brigade indicated that the fire actually started at Mojo's Bistro, probably due to "flying embers" from a hookah, which is a device used to inhale vaporised substances, using charcoal to heat the apparatus. The hookahs provided at Mojo's Bistro used coal that releases embers instead of higher-quality coal that does not.

The Mumbai Fire Brigade's report indicated that the fire spread from Mojo's Pub to the adjacent 1 Above, via flammable material including curtains, decorative flowers, and the bamboo canopies that had been illegally constructed on the roof. Mumbai Fire Brigade's deputy chief fire officer R. Chaudhary said both 1 Above and Mojo's Bistro did not have functioning emergency exits or working fire safety equipment. This was confirmed in the technical investigation report, which also found that the only emergency exit from the rooftop was locked, and had been further obstructed by stacks of beer kegs, which later exploded during the fire. The technical investigation report also found that neither 1 Above nor Mojo's Pub had been able to produce the licenses and permissions needed to provide hookahs, serve alcohol, or food, on the rooftop.

The technical investigation report also noted that the managers did not alert emergency services when the fire began, and that the fire brigade was only called when a security guard in the building raised an alarm. The fixed fire extinguishing system in the building was not working and fire exits on lower flowers were obstructed by illegal construction and construction, causing persons to become trapped and limiting escape routes.

=== Departmental investigation by the MCGM ===
On 29 December 2017, immediately after the incident, Maharashtra Chief Minister Devendra Fadnavis directed the MCGM to conduct an inquiry into the incident. Municipal Commissioner Ajoy Mehta had initially suspended five officials immediately after the incident, including assistant divisional fire officer Sandeep Shinde, designated officer Madhukar Shelar, junior engineer Dharmaraj Shinde, sub-engineer Dinesh Mahale, and medical health officer Satish Badgire. The Commissioner's detailed investigation report was filed with the state government of Maharashtra, and found 12 MCGM officials, including the 5 already suspended, to be guilty of misconduct. Two senior officials, the assistant municipal commissioner of G South Ward, Prashant Sapkale and his predecessor, Bhagyashree Kapse, were found guilty of failing to conduct adequate supervision over licensing and regulation. Three officers were nominated for dismissal, and others faced disciplinary action with the MCGM.

The day after the fire, the MCGM also immediately suspended five officials and one officer of the Mumbai Fire Brigade, and transferred an Assistant Municipal Commissioner. The MCGM Commissioner, Ajoy Mehta, opened an investigation into the causes of the fire, and sent a preliminary report to the Maharashtra State Government on 29 December 2017, stating there was 'gross negligence' in maintaining safety regulations. In 2019, data obtained under the Right to Information Act 2005 revealed that the MCGM had failed to take disciplinary action against those identified by their internal investigation in the Kamala Mills fire.

An additional investigative report submitted in 2020 by the MCGM indicated that 23% of the land developed for commercial use in the Kamala Mills compound had been done on a fraudulent basis, and that 11.93% of the development was in violation of fire safety norms.

=== Arrests and suspensions ===
==== Arrests ====
Immediately after the fire, the Mumbai Police filed an accidental death report. Preliminary reports from fire fighters indicated that 1 Above did not have any fire exits, and consequently, the Mumbai Police filed an investigation report against the three partners and manager of 1 Above. Abhijeet Mankar, the who owned Sigrid Hospitalia, the parent company of 1 Above, were to be investigated for the offences of causing hurt by endangering lives, and culpable homicide not amounting to murder, under the Indian Penal Code. The two managers of 1 Above, Kevin Bawa and Gibson Lopez, were also arrested and detained in police custody. The owners of 1 Above initially fled, avoiding arrest, but were caught and detained by the Mumbai Police on 11 January 2018.

Following an investigation by the Mumbai Fire Brigade, which found that the fire may have actually begun at Mojo's Pub, the owners of Mojo's Pub were also arrested. Yug Pathak, one of the owners, was arrested on 12 January 2018. Yug Tulli, the other owner of Mojo's Pub, initially evaded the police and was eventually arrested a year later after he surrendered to the Mumbai Police at N.M.Joshi Marg Station.

=== Trial ===
As of July 2020, the trial in the case of the Kamala Mills Fire is still ongoing.

In April 2018, a Sessions Court in Mumbai denied bail to seven persons accused in the case, including Rajendra Baban Patil, a Fire Officer responsible for certifying the two restaurants where the fire began; Yug Pathak (one of the owners of Mojo's Pub); Abhijit Mankar (the owners of 1 Above) and Ramesh Govani and Ravi Bhandari (the owners of the Kamala Mills Compound). The two managers of 1 Above, Kevin Bawa and Lisbon Lopez, were released on bail. The other owner of Mojo's Pub, Yug Tulli, was arrested after evading the police for several months, and his bail application was also rejected.

On 27 March 2018, Ravi Surajmal Bhandari, one of the owners of the Kamala Mills commercial complex, withdrew a challenge to his arrest and detention in police custody at the Supreme Court, in connection with the 2017 fire, preferring instead to apply for bail at the trial court. Bhandari and the other owner of the Kamala Mills complex, Ramesh Govani, were both granted bail by the Bombay High Court on 19 May 2018. On 15 December 2018, the Supreme Court of India released Kripesh and Jigar Sanghavi, the owners of 1 Above on bail, pointing out that while bail had been granted to them by the Bombay High Court, their release had been delayed because they had not been provided with copies of the bail order. In June 2018, Rajendra Baban Patil, the Fire Officer accused in the case, was granted bail, and in April 2019, the last remaining accused person in custody, Sayyid Ali, a waiter at 1 Above, was granted bail.

=== Public interest litigation and judicial inquiry ===
In 2018, Julio Ribeiro, a former police commissioner in the Mumbai Police, filed a Public Interest Litigation petition in the Mumbai High Court, asking the High Court to constitute a judicial inquiry into the causes of the Kamala Mills fire, including the licensing and regulation of the two restaurants where the fire broke out, by the MCGM. The Bombay High Court ordered the constitution of a three-member panel to conduct such an investigation, consisting of a retired judge, A V Savant, an architect, Vasant Thakur, and former municipal commissioner K Nalinakshan.

On 12 September 2018, the three-member judicial panel filed their report with the Bombay High Court. The panel found that the owner of the Kamala Mills land had breached regulations by illegally constructing commercial spaces for lease, in violation of the permitted development of FSI. In addition to breaches by the owner of the land, the panel found that the two restaurants, 1 Above and Mojo's Pub, were functioning in violation of several building and fire safety norms established by the MCGM. The panel found the two restaurants had illegally converted the rooftop into a seating and dining area, and had further illegally stocked flammable materials there as well, including alcohol, kerosene, and coal. The panel recommended criminal action against the owner of the Kamala Mills premises as well as the owners of the two restaurants where the fire initially spread, and called for a departmental inquiry at the MCGM and the State Excise Department.

The High Court Panel criticised the MCGM and State Government for granting permissions without adequate checks and balances under programs aimed at improving the ease of doing business in Maharashtra. The panel also recommended that the interior designers and architects responsible for the rooftop constructions at 1 Above and Mojo's Pub should be investigated for professional misconduct and inadequate qualifications, finding that one of the architects for 1 Above, Sumesh Menon, had failed to meet minimum training requirements.

=== Fire safety ===
After the Kamala Mills Fire, the Mumbai Fire Brigade launched a special safety drive to review compliance with fire safety norms at restaurants and bars in the city, and ordered 87 establishments to be shut down for failure to comply with regulations.

The Kamala Mills fire incident led to other cities in India revisiting fire safety regulations and compliance to prevent similar incidents. Immediately after the incident, the Government of Delhi asked the Delhi Fire Service to inspect restaurants and bars for compliance with safety regulations, citing the Kamala Mills fire as a reason. The Nagpur Municipal Corporation also conducted a review of rooftop bars and restaurants and demolished unauthorised constructions.
