= Mufti (company) =

Indian Clothing fashion brand

Credo Brands Marketing Limited
- Trade name: Mufti
- Type: Public
- Traded as: NSE: MUFTI; BSE: 544058
- Industry: Apparel, footwear, men, fashion, denim
- Founded: 1998
- Founder: Kamal Khushlani
- Headquarters: Mumbai, India
- Number of locations: 1,400 outlets, 120 stores
- Products: Clothing, Footwear
- Brands: Mufti Jeans, Mufti Footwear
- Website: www.muftijeans.in

Mufti is an Indian men's clothing brand founded by Kamal Khushlani in 1998. It manufactures shirts, jeans, t-shirts, sweatshirts, sweaters, joggers, blazers and jackets. It is owned and managed by Credo Brands Marketing Limited. It owns 1,400 multi brand outlets and 120 large format stores.

== History ==
The company was started with a ₹10,000 loan from Khushlani's maternal aunt. In 2014, Bennett, Coleman & Co. Ltd. and some of Khushlani's friends owned a 35 per cent stake and Khushlani holds a 65 per cent stake in the company.

Mufti expanded into the footwear in December 2018. In 2018, the brand announced it will be expanding its product portfolio by focusing on athleisure clothing and accessories. In July 2018, Mufti signed Kartik Aaryan as a brand ambassador.

== Awards ==
Year	Award(s)	Awarding organisation	Result	Ref.
2012	Retail Icon of India	Asia Retail Congress	Won	
2015	Brand of the Year in Men's Casual Wear at APEX awards	Clothing Manufacturers Association of India	Won	
2019	Customer Loyalty Initiative of the Year Award	Indian Retail Awards	Won	
2019	Retailer of the Year	ET Now, Asia Retail Congress, Global Brand Excellence Awards	Won	
