= Faye D'Souza =

Indian journalist (born 1981)

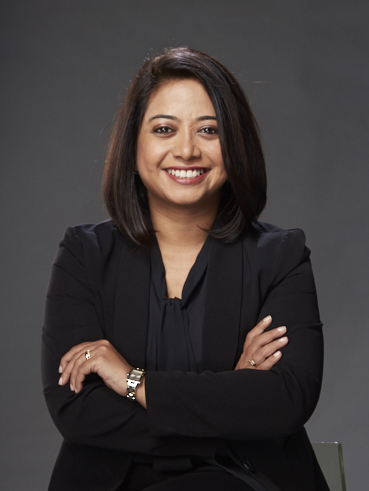
- D'Souza in 2017
- Born: Faye Elvira D'Souza; 8 October 1981 (age 45); Chikmagalur, Karnataka, India
- Education: Mount Carmel College, Bangalore; Convergence Institute of Media, Management and Information Technology Studies
- Occupation: News presenter
- Years active: 2003–present
- Organization: BOOM
- Notable credit(s): The Urban Debate, Investor's Guide, All About Stocks and The Property Guide
- Spouse: Sagar Gokhale
- Children: 1

Faye Elvira D'Souza (born 8 October 1981) is an Indian journalist and news presenter. She worked as the executive editor of Mirror Now, which is owned by The Times Group. She rose to fame with the show The Urban Debate on Mirror Now, where she anchored on subjects of corruption, communal violence and independent press. D'Souza has previously worked as an anchor and editorial lead on Investor's Guide on ET Now a member of the CNBC TV18 newsroom. She has been awarded the RedInk Award for ‘Journalist of the Year’ in 2018.

== Early life ==
Faye Elvira D'Souza was born on 8 October 1981 in Chikmagalur, Karnataka to Flossy M. and Franklin S. D'Souza, into a family of Mangalorean Catholics, and grew up in Bangalore where she studied journalism at the Mount Carmel College. She holds a bachelor's degree in journalism and English literature and a master's degree in Mass Communication. She completed her post graduate studies from Commits in Bengaluru.

== Career ==
=== Career beginnings ===
D'Souza started her journalism career with All India Radio, while she was a student. She then worked as a post graduate journalist at CNBC TV 18 in 2003 and later moved on to reporting about mutual funds, insurance and personal finance. She ran three weekly shows on ET Now – Investor's Guide, All About Stocks and The Property Guide.

=== Mirror Now and The Urban Debate ===
The Times network launched the English news channel Mirror Now in April 2017. D'Souza was made its senior editor. The flagship show on Mirror Now, The Urban Debate was started, according to her to "shine an uncomfortable spotlight on apathy, inefficiency and corruption which is the root cause of most problems that we face as Indians today.". In 2018 The RedInk Award for ‘Journalist of the Year’ was awarded to D’Souza. She has been awarded for her blistering coverage of issues that touch the lives of common people. Her style of handling subjects like corruption, political opportunism, price rise and communalism over calendar 2017 has made her and her programme ‘The Urban Debate’ extremely popular with the masses. She resigned from Mirror Now's daily operations on 9 September 2019. Vinay Tewari replaced her as the new Managing Editor at the news channel.

=== New ventures ===
In January 2020, D'Souza teamed up with an online video platform named FireWork, to produce and release short video clips in which she speaks about the current news.
