= Times Now =

Indian English language news channel

- Logo used since 2006
- Country: India
- Headquarters: Mumbai, Maharashtra, India

Programming
- Language: English
- Picture format: 1080i HDTV

Ownership
- Owner: The Times Group
- Sister channels: Times Now Navbharat; Zoom; ET Now; Movies Now; Romedy Now; Mirror Now; MNX; MN+ ET Now Swadesh

History
- Launched: 23 January 2006; 20 years ago

Links
- Website: timesnownews.com

Availability

Terrestrial
- Fetch TV (Australia): 719

Streaming media
- Live Stream: Watch Live
- Live Stream on Zenga TV: Watch Live

Times Now is an English-language news channel in India owned and operated by The Times Group. The channel launched on 23 January 2006 in partnership with Reuters. It is a pay television throughout India. Until 2016, it was India's most popular and the most viewed English news channel.

== History ==
In 2016 Arnab Goswami (the earlier editor-in-chief) left the channel to launch Republic TV; S. Sundaram, who had served as the CFO for Times Now between 2005 and 2012, was named the Group CFO. Goswami resigned as editor-in-chief of Times Now on 1 November 2016, citing editorial differences, lack of freedom and newsroom politics. He hosted the last edition of his show, The Newshour Debate, a fortnight later. This came after the show had been subject to an investigation by Ofcom, the UK broadcasting regulatory authority, in August and September; the investigation had held Times Now guilty of violating the impartiality clause of its broadcast code, stating that Goswami had presented without impartiality, including sometimes not letting his panellists speak at all.

In May 2017, The Times Group lodged a complaint against Goswami and Prema Sridevi, a journalist with Republic TV, under the Indian Penal Code and Information Technology Act, 2000 accusing them of copyright infringement. BCCL alleged that the two, previously employed with Times Now, that it owns and operates, had used its intellectual property (IP) in telecasting certain audio tapes that were in their possession during their time at the channel. Alongside IP infringement, the complaint also alleged the commission of offenses of theft, criminal breach of trust and misappropriation of property, on the two, on multiple occasions days after the channel's launch.

Times India eventually expanded the Times Now into a news network:

Channel	Language	Genre
Times Now	English	News
Times Now World	English	News
Mirror Now	English	News
ET Now	English	News
Times Now NavBharat	Hindi	News
ET Now Swadesh	Hindi	News

== Distribution ==
Along with the other Times group channels (Zoom, ET Now and Movies Now), Times Now is distributed by Media Network and Distribution (India) Ltd (MNDIL), which is a joint venture between The Times Group and Yogesh Radhakrishnan, a cable and satellite industry veteran, under the brand Prime Connect.

== Employees ==
- Rahul Shivshankar – Editor-in-chief (till January, 2023)
- Navika Kumar – Group editor
- Maroof Raza – Consultant and strategic affairs expert

== Lawsuits ==
On 15 November 2011, in the country's highest defamation suit, the Supreme Court upheld the Bombay High Court's order requiring Times Now to pay ₹100 crore. The channel had erroneously run the picture of Supreme Court judge P.B. Sawant picture instead of someone similarly named as part of a Provident Fund scandal, and the payment went directly to Sawant.

In 2018, Times Now aired derogatory remarks about activist Sanjukta Basu. She filed a complaint with the News Broadcasting Standards Authority in March 2019. In October 2020, she moved Supreme Court claiming that her case was pending with NBSA. Before the case could be listed for hearing in the Supreme court, NBSA released the judgement on her complaint. NBSA ordered Times Now to air apology on live TV at 8PM and 9PM during the prime time and submit DVD copies of the same. NBSA found that Times Now had not contacted Basu to get her version and failed to verify the facts before broadcasting. This conduct was judged to be a violation of NBSA guidelines. The NBSA order noted that "there was an absence of neutrality in the programme".

== Controversies ==
=== Violation of Code of Ethics and Broadcasting Standards ===
Times Now was accused of misrepresenting facts regarding an interview of an alleged eve teaser. The News Broadcasting Standards Authority asked Times Now to apologise and fined them ₹50,000.

The National Broadcasting Standards Authority (NBSA) reprimanded the channel for a bias in their coverage of the Tablighi Jamaat congregation on 23 June 2016 for violating the Code of Ethics and Broadcasting Standards.

=== 2020 Delhi riots ===
In 2021, the National Broadcasting and Digital Standards Authority (NBDSA) found that debates by two Times Now anchors – Rahul Shivshankar and Padmaja Joshi on the topic 2020 Delhi riots were not conducted in an "impartial and objective manner". NBDSA found that the anchors had "violated the Fundamental Principles as enumerated in the Code of Ethics and Broadcasting Standards and various Guidelines issued by NBDSA". In his order NBDSA chairperson Justice (retired) A.K. Sikri directed Times Now to take down videos of from YouTube and websites. NBDSA had ordered this responding to the complaint filed against Shivshankar accusing him of selectively showing the observations of the courts and the police to make it appear as if the anti-Citizenship (Amendment) Act protestors were responsible for the religious violence. The order quoted, "The coverage was done to target a community that is critical of the Delhi Police's investigation and project them and their critique in a negative light, thereby unduly hindering the right of the viewer to have a fact based view on the matter and amounted to a sustained campaign to challenge a position, without intimating to the viewers what that position is in its entirety or allowing panellists to explain the same".

=== 2020–2021 China–India skirmishes ===
In June 2020, during a broadcast, Group Editor Navika Kumar reported that 30 Chinese soldiers had been killed in the Galwan Valley clash and read out names that were later identified as fabricated.

== Reception ==
The channel is widely seen as supportive of Narendra Modi and the Bharatiya Janata Party. Times Now has been criticised for reporting misinformation.

The channel is accused of practicing biased reporting in favour of the ruling Bharatiya Janata Party (BJP) and is included among pro-Narendra Modi "Godi media" outlets.

Alt News accused Times Now in 2018 of repeatedly reporting "unverified claims, distorted facts and plain lies", including taking video clips out of context. In 2022, Alt News wrote that they found Times Now to be one of the most prominent sharers of misinformation in the Indian media that year.

According to a 2022 BBC News article, several Indian news anchors including Times Now's Shivshankar are known to shout down their panelists and ranting during their show, and have been accused of bias towards India's governing party, Bharatiya Janata Party and Prime Minister Narendra Modi.

In 2020, Newslaundry reported that Shivshankar had used several dog whistles to negatively portray the Indian Muslims.

On 6 September 2021, Times Now was criticised for a report using video that suggested a Pakistan Air Force jet was hovering over Afghanistan's Panjshir Valley. The video was soon revealed to be a United States Air Force F-15 jet filmed by a YouTube airplane enthusiast in Wales filming the jet within the Mach Loop three months before.

== See also ==
- ET Now
- Zoom TV Entertainment
- Times Now Navbharat
- Times Drive
