= MNX =

MNX or mnx may refer to:

- Manicoré Airport (IATA: MNX), an airport serving Manicoré, Brazil
- Manx Airlines (ICAO: MNX), a defunct Isle of Man-based airline that operated from 1982 to 2002
- MNX (TV channel), an Indian English language movie television channel
- Sougb language (ISO 639-3: mnx), a Papuan language of the East Bird's Head language family
