= Times Now Navbharat =

- Country: India
- Broadcast area: Worldwide
- Headquarters: Noida, Uttar Pradesh, India

Programming
- Language: Hindi
- Picture format: 1080i HDTV

Ownership
- Owner: The Times Group
- Sister channels: Times Now; Zoom; ET Now; Movies Now; Romedy Now; MN+ MNX; Mirror Now; ET Now Swadesh

History
- Launched: 1 August 2021; 5 years ago

Links
- Website: timesnowhindi.com

Availability

Streaming media
- Live Stream: Watch Live

Times Now Navbharat is a Hindi-language television news channel based in Noida, India.

== Details ==
Times Now Navbharat is owned by Times Group. It is one of the most watched Hindi channels in the country. This channel operates from Noida, Uttar Pradesh. It began on 1 August 2021 in HD version. After this it also began in SD version on 1 January 2022. This move allowed the channel to expand to a larger audience.

Along with the other Times group channels (Zoom, ET Now and Movies Now), Times Now is distributed by Media Network and Distribution (India) Ltd (MNDIL), which is a joint venture between The Times Group and Yogesh Radhakrishnan, a cable and satellite industry veteran, under the brand Prime Connect.

== News shows ==
- Sawal Public Ka
- News ki Pathshala
- Dhakad Exclusive
- Logtantra
- Rashtravad
