= Artha Group =

Indian Real Estate Company

- Industry: Real estate
- Founded: 2008
- Founder: Suresh Rangarajan
- Headquarters: Bangalore, India
- Area served: India
- Key people: R Chandrashekar (Chief Operating Officer)
- Products: Villas; Apartments; Shopping malls Hotel Residences
- Website: www.arthaproperty.com

Artha Group, a subsidiary of Bennett Property Holdings Company Limited (The Times Group) is a property developer in South India. The company executes its development activities in approximately 250 acres of land & 3,500 crores of projects in South India. The geographical presence of Artha Group spans across cities like Bangalore, Chennai, Mumbai, Dubai, Abu Dhabi & Bahrain.

== History ==
Artha was one of the major builders to participate in ‘Grahotsav 2011’, the Home Realty Festival organized by Nu Media Associates. This property exhibition was held especially for the IT & BT personnel in Bangalore South, India. Recently in April 2014, the company also participated in the Dubai International Property Show arranged under the National Real Estate Development Council (Naredco) with other prominent property developers.

== Corporate social responsibility ==
Shishu Griha – Shelter Homes for underprivileged children

== Awards and accolades ==
- Most Innovative Marketing Concept of the Year, At Accommodation Times National Real Estate Awards – 2011
- Emerging India Business Award, by Institute of Economic Studies (IES) for showing exemplary growth in business – 2012
