= Rahul Shivshankar =

Indian journalist and television news anchor

- Shivshankar's Picture
- Born: 22 January 1975 (age 51)
- Occupation: Journalist News Anchor
- Years active: 1995–present
- Employer: Editor-in-chief CNN-News18 (2023-Present)
- Notable credit(s): India Upfront; Confront
- Website: www.rahulshivshankar.com

Rahul Shivshankar (Hindi: राहुल शिवशंकर, born 22 January 1975) is an Indian journalist and an Indian TV anchor who worked as the editor-in-chief at Times Now. Before joining Times Now, Shivshankar worked in print and TV journalism. He has anchored five shows and has served as the senior news editor at Times Now (2005). Shivshankar worked very briefly with Headlines Today (since rebranded India Today) as the executive editor. He hosts the debate show India Upfront. He recently moved to CNN-News18 (co-owned by Network18 Group and Warner Bros.)

== Career ==
Shivshankar started his career in the mid-1990s as a print reporter.

He was part of the launch team of Headlines Today in 2003, and shortly thereafter accepted the role of lead writer. He led the newsroom of the Headlines Today, where he worked as executive editor.

He was praised for his coverage of the 2008 Mumbai attacks, and contributed to a book about it.

In 2013, he moved to NewsX as the managing editor and anchor and a year later was elevated to the editor in chief. In 2014, the ENBA awarded NewsX as the "Best English News Channel of the Year." At NewsX, he has presented the shows Nation@9 and Insight.

=== Times Now ===
Shivshankar was a part of the team that launched Times Now. In 2016 he joined Times Now as editor-in-chief, replacing Arnab Goswami. In June 2021, he was appointed editorial director by Times Network, where he also continued to lead the editorial mandate of the channel.

As of 2021, Shivshankar hosts India Upfront, a debate show on Times Now and he won Best Primetime Show (English) at the 13th ENBA Awards. Besides India Upfront, Shivshankar also anchors four other shows, including The Breaking News Show and Live Report, and the one-hour weekend show Confront, which invites two panellists to debate on social and political topics concerning state issues, elections and the economy, and others. The show has featured Jay Panda, former Member of Parliament, Yogendra Yadav, National President of Swaraj India, Sudheendra Kulkarni, and Kanwal Sibal, former foreign secretary since its launch in 2018. As of 2021, Shivshankar writes a monthly column for the editorial page of the Times of India.

In March 2022, a clip of one of his TV debates went viral on the internet. Shivshankar confused two of his guests and spent two minutes berating one of them until realising his mistake.

== Lawsuits ==
In 2020, the journalist Kanchan Srivastava filed a ₹5 crore defamation suit against Shivshankar and Times Now's managing director Vineet Jain, accusing Shivshankar of defaming her by presenting her as "Rhea lobby" (supporter of the actor Rhea Chakraborty), on his India Upfront show.

Mamata Banerjee's nephew and Member of Parliament, Lok Sabha, Abhishek Banerjee lodged a case against Shivshankar for allegedly telecasting a 'defamatory' audiotape about him on Times Now news channel.

== Books ==
Modi And India: 2024 and the Battle for Bharat.
