= Rashmi Kashyap =

Indian beauty and fashion industry entrepreneur

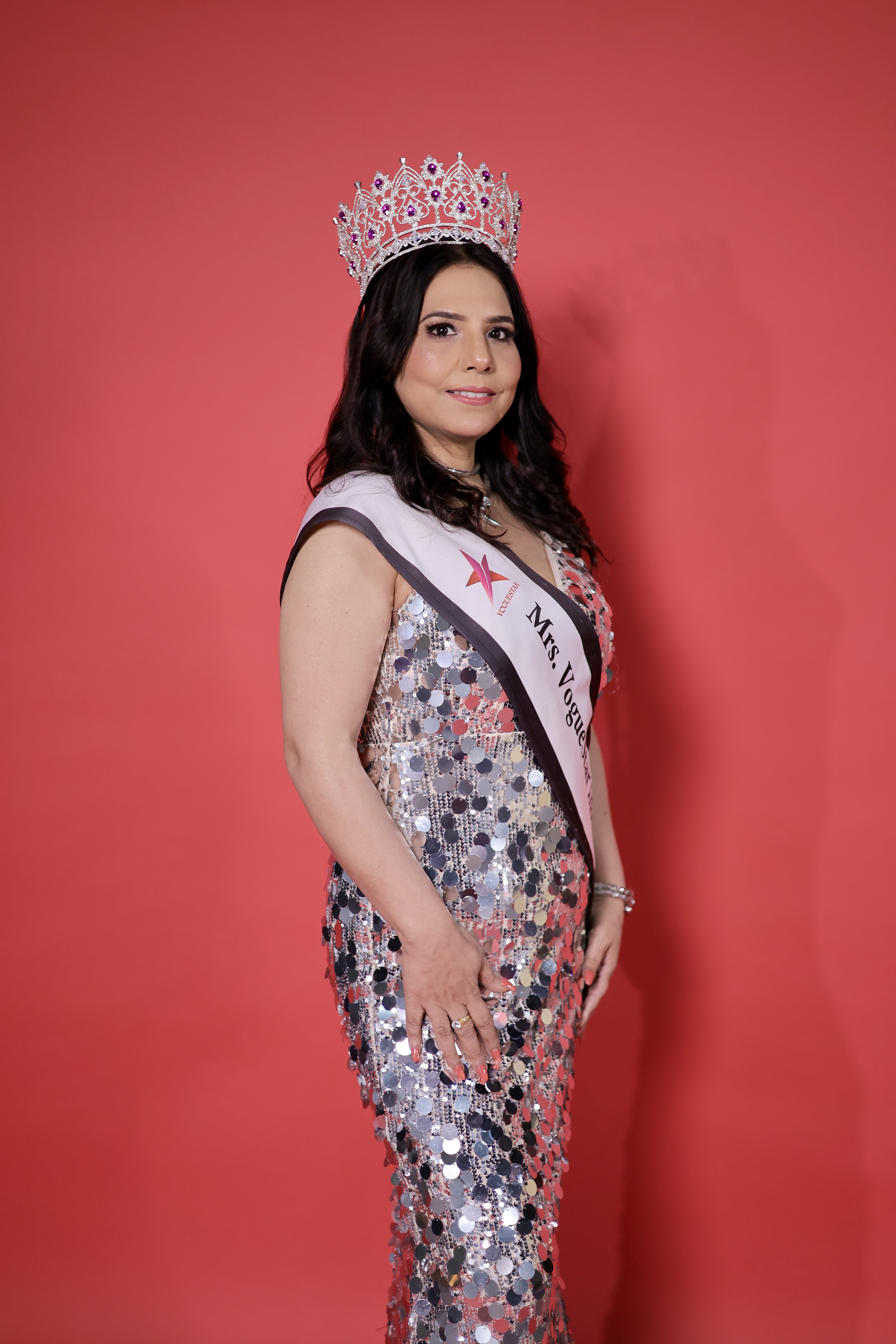
- Kashyap in 2024
- Born: December 22, 1974 (age 51); New Delhi, India
- Occupations: Entrepreneur, Transformational Coach, Educator, Blogger, Fashion Designer, Personality Groomer
- Spouse: Col. Tarun Kumar (m. 1995)
- Children: 2
- Website: soulnspiritblog.com

Rashmi Kashyap is an educator, fashion designer, beauty pageant winner, motivational speaker, Indian entrepreneur and empowerment advocate recognized for her contributions to the beauty and fashion industry.

== Early life and education ==
Kashyap resides in New Delhi, where her father was employed with the State Bank of India. She studied Fashion Design at the International Polytechnic for Women in Delhi and obtained a Bachelor of Arts degree from the University of Delhi. She later pursued a Bachelor of Education (B.Ed.), as well as master’s degrees in English and Education (M.A., M.Ed.).

== Career ==
Kashyap began her professional life in fashion design and education. She married Colonel Tarun Kumar of the Indian Army in 1995, and as an army spouse, lived in various parts of India over the following decades, continuing work in education and personal coaching throughout. She has two sons.

She later established Soul n Spirit, a brand focused on sustainable fashion, mindful living, and holistic personal development, through which she works as a brand strategist, speaker, and coach. The platform promotes women's empowerment and self-expression.

Kashyap has spoken at events on topics including women's empowerment, entrepreneurship, and self-transformation. She has also participated in panels on human rights and sustainability, including with organisations such as the All India Sustainable Development Council.

In 2026, she served as the Glam Partner for the Ahmedabad Times Fashion Week, organised by The Times of India Group.

== Pageantry ==
In 2024, Kashyap won the title of Mrs. VogueStar India, gaining public attention for her presence in the beauty and personal development sectors.

In 2025, she was honored with the Femina Achievers Award in the category of Excellence in Fashion, Sustainable Entrepreneurship, and Social Impact, held in New Delhi, India.”

In 2025, she has been announced as official Glam Partner of Ahmedabad by Times week

== Literary Work ==
In 2025, Kashyap published ''Soul n Spirit'', a collection of poetry released by BlueRose Publishers. The 95-page collection addresses themes of self-discovery, resilience, and personal transformation. It is divided into sections covering subjects such as relationships, nature, philosophy, and travel Kashyap is the author of a poetry collection titled Soul n Spirit. The book serves as a cornerstone for her brand, blending luxury, beauty, and social consciousness.

== Entrepreneurship ==
Dynamic Entrepreneur Award 2024 by The Times Group, Gujarat.

== Awards ==
She was crowned Mrs. VogueStar India 2024 and has received accolades such as the International Icon Award 2024 and the Dynamic Entrepreneur of the Year at the Times Gujarat Icons 2024. Kashyap is also known for her work as a brand strategist, speaker, and sustainability advocate.

Kashyap was recognised at the Femina Achievers Gujarat edition, organised by Femina, India's women's lifestyle publication. She received the award in the category of Excellence in Fashion, Sustainable Entrepreneurship, and Social Impact.

In 2025, Kashyap was named the official Glam Partner for the Ahmedabad Times Fashion Week, an annual fashion event organised by The Times of India Group in Ahmedabad, Gujarat.

She recently got awarded with the Times power brands gujrat 2026 award for her excellence achievements at Soul&spirit
