= 2019 Surat fire =

2019 electrical fire in a commercial complex in Surat, Gujarat, India

- Date: 24 May 2019
- Time: 3:45–4:00 p.m. IST
- Venue: Takshashila Arcade
- Location: Sarthana, Surat, Gujarat, India; 21°13′51″N 72°54′03″E
- Cause: Electrical short circuit
- Deaths: 22
- Injuries: 19

On 24 May 2019, a fire occurred at a commercial complex in Sarthana Jakatnaka area of Surat in the Gujarat state of India. Twenty-two students died and 19 others were injured in an academic coaching centre located on the building's terrace. The fire was started by a short circuit on the ground floor; the students in the coaching centre were trapped by the destruction of a wooden staircase. Three people were arrested for their alleged involvement or their alleged negligence leading to the fire and the deaths.

== Background ==
Fire safety regulations are poorly enforced in India. In the 2004 Kumbakonam School fire, 94 students died; subsequently, the Indian Supreme Court directed the government and schools to enforce strict fire safety compliance. On 26 November 2018, a student and a teacher died in an accidental fire at a coaching centre located in the Vesu area of Surat, leading to the fire department officials of the Surat Municipal Corporation inspecting and sending notices to 230 coaching centres. On 30 January 2019, 27 students were rescued from a coaching centre operating in a housing building when a fire broke out in a mattress shop on the ground floor. In February 2019, 17 people died in a fire in a hotel in Delhi.

== Fire ==
The fire occurred at a commercial complex called Takshashila Arcade, located in the Sarthana area of Surat. Smart Design Studio, a coaching centre, was operating in a makeshift dome built on the terrace of the building. The fire broke out between 3:45 p.m. and 4:00 p.m. (IST). An electrical short circuit in air conditioner started a fire on the ground floor near a staircase on the rear side of the building. The fire quickly spread, engulfing the third floor and the makeshift dome on the terrace of the building. There were about 50 to 70 students in the coaching centre at the time. Two shops and several vehicles parked near the building were also destroyed in another fire ignited by the blaze.

The fire brigade arrived with 19 fire engines and two hydraulic platforms. They doused the fire in an hour and rescued several students; however, several had jumped off the building to save themselves.

A total of 22 students died: 18 girls and 4 boys, aged between 15 and 22. Of these, 16 students died due to fire or asphyxiation, 3 died as they jumped off the terrace of the building, and 3 succumbed to the fire-burns they sustained. Three of the students who died had appeared for the Class XII exams of the Gujarat education board, the results of which were declared on 25 May 2019, a day after their deaths. A further 16 students were admitted to hospital; a child aged three or four years old was also hospitalised with burn injuries.

== Investigation ==
The Surat Municipal Corporation officials ordered an investigation regarding the statutory permission, including fire safety, of the building. The Surat Urban Development Authority (SUDA) had approved the plan for a residential scheme on the site in 2001 but a commercial complex was built illegally in 2007. Under the Gujarat Regularization of Unauthorized Development Act, the complex with its second floor was legalised in 2013. The third floor was not legally approved. The coaching centre owner had also constructed a six-foot high makeshift dome illegally on the terrace. More than 50 burnt tires were also found on the terrace. There was no fire safety equipment in the building. The students were trapped because the only way to the top floor was a wooden staircase which was destroyed by the fire. Two fire officers were suspended for their alleged negligence in conducting the fire safety inspection of the building.

Three people including the coaching centre owner and builders were arrested and the complaints against them were filed by the police.

Gujarat Chief Minister Vijay Rupani had also ordered the investigation under Additional Chief Secretary of the Urban Development Department Mukesh Puri. The National Human Rights Commission also issued a notice to the Government of Gujarat.

== Aftermath ==
Ahmedabad Municipal Corporation and Vadodara Municipal Corporation issued notices to all premises housing children, containing orders to remain closed until they receive a fire safety compliance certificate. Later, the Government of Gujarat ordered the shut down of all private coaching centres in the state until fire safety inspections are conducted. The government also ordered a fire safety inspection of schools, colleges, coaching centres, hospitals, shopping malls and other commercial buildings. The Delhi fire service decided to conduct the fire safety inspection of all coaching centres in Delhi.

Rupani visited the hospitals, offered condolences to the families and announced the compensation of ₹4 lakh (US$4,200) each to the families of children who died in the accident. Several politicians expressed support and condolences, including Prime Minister Narendra Modi, Amit Shah, Union Home Minister Rajnath Singh, Ashok Gehlot and Rahul Gandhi.

== See also ==
- 1837 Surat fire
- 2024 Rajkot gaming zone fire
