= Bangalore Mirror =

Indian newspaper

- Type: Daily newspaper
- Format: Compact
- Owner: Bennett, Coleman & Co. Ltd.
- Publisher: Bennett, Coleman & Co. Ltd.
- Editor: Seena Menon
- Founded: 2002
- Relaunched: 2007
- Language: English
- Headquarters: Bangalore
- Website: www.bangaloremirror.com

Bangalore Mirror is an English-language daily published by The Times Group in Bangalore, India, as a compact newspaper. It is a deputed newspaper and is the second-largest circulating English daily in the city. In 2020, as part of its COVID-19 downsizing drive, The Times Group merged other editions of Mirror into a weekly affair, except Bangalore Mirror.

Bangalore Mirror continues to be the leading daily catering to the tabloid/compact newspaper segment in the young metropolis, focusing largely on original stories that matter to Bengaluru, and its young urban population.

== Vijay Times ==
Vijay Times was an English newspaper started by Vijayananda printers in December 2002. The newspaper along with other sister publications was bought by the Bennett, Coleman & Co. Ltd. in 2006, publishers of India's leading newspaper, The Times of India. It ceased publication on 7 June 2007, and was replaced by the Bangalore Mirror.
