= News Broadcasters and Digital Association =

Organisation of the Indian news broadcasters

- Abbreviation: NBDA
- Formation: 3 July 2007
- Type: Private organisation.
- President: Avinash Pandey; CEO (ABP Network)
- Vice President: M. V. Shreyams Kumar (JMD - Mathrubhumi News)
- Main organ: Board of Directors
- Website: www.nbdanewdelhi.com

Logo of the NBDA when it was known as the News Broadcasters Association

The News Broadcasters and Digital Association (NBDA) formerly known as the News Broadcasters Association (NBA) is a private association of different current affairs and news television broadcasters in India. It was established by Indian news broadcasters on 3 July 2007. The Association was set up to deal with ethical, operational, regulatory, technical and legal issues affecting news and current affairs channels.

In August 2021, News Broadcasters Association was renamed as News Broadcasters & Digital Association after inclusion of digital media news broadcasters in the association.

== Membership ==
Membership in the association is governed by qualifying certain guidelines. Besides this, an annual subscription fee has also to be paid by the applicant/member. The association as of date has 27 members representing 70 channels.

== News Broadcasting and Digital Standards Authority ==
The News Broadcasting and Digital Standards Authority (NBDSA) is an independent body, set up by the News Broadcasters and Digital Association. The NBDSA was created to consider and adjudicate complaints about broadcasts. It was formerly known as the News Broadcasting Standards Authority (NBSA).

== Controversies ==
The NBDA Board Members, who are linked to various print and electronic media outlets, were accused by many of adopting double standards, as they immediately called for the closure of TRP scam case investigation by the Central Bureau of Investigation in an FIR filed in Uttar Pradesh in October 2020, which could have possibly highlighted the involvement of many of the member channels role in the scam. However, many of the members had earlier given wide coverage to the TRP scam case, accusing a rival channel Republic TV of TRP fudging, when an investigation was launched into the TRP scam by the Mumbai Police accusing Republic TV.

== Members ==
Its founding members of the NBDA were:

- Independent News Service Pvt Ltd
- Media Content and Communication Services (India) Ltd
- New Delhi Television Ltd
- TV18 Broadcast Ltd
- Times Global Broadcasting Company Ltd
- TV Today Network Ltd
- Zee Media Corporation Ltd

== Board members of NBDA in the year 2019-20 ==
The Office Bearers of NBDA for the year 2019-20 are:

1. Rajat Sharma – President (Chairman & Editor-in-Chief (India TV) – Independent News Service Pvt. Ltd.)

2. I. Venkat - Vice President (Director - Eenadu Television Pvt Ltd)

3. Anuradha Prasad Shukla – Honorary Treasurer (Chairperson-cum-Managing Director, BAG Network 24 Ltd)

The other Members on the NBA Board are:

4. M.K. Anand, Managing Director & Chief Executive Officer – Times Network - Bennett, Coleman and Co. Ltd

5. M.V. Shreyams Kumar, Joint Managing Director, Mathrubhumi Printing & Publishing Co. Ltd.

6. Rahul Joshi, CEO of News and Group Editor-in-Charge - TV18 Broadcast Ltd

7. Avinash Pandey, Chief Operating Officer - ABP Network Pvt Ltd

8. Kalli Purie Bhandal, Vice-chairperson & Managing Director - TV Today Network Ltd.

9. Sonia Singh, editorial director, New Delhi Television Ltd

10. Sudhir Chaudhary, chief executive officer - Cluster 1, TV Today Network Ltd
