= Mumbai Fire Brigade =

Municipal service in India

Agency overview
- Established: 1855 (as a municipal department from 1 April 1887 onwards)
- Fire chief: Ravindra N. Ambulgekar
- EMS level: BLS
- Motto: "शौर्यम्, आत्मसँयमम्, त्यागः" "Śauryaṃ, Ātmasaṃyamam, Tyāgaḥ" (Sanskrit:"Valour, Abnegation, Sacrifice")

Facilities and equipment
- Stations: 34
- Trucks: 115
- Ambulances: 15

Website
- mahafireservice.gov.in

The Mumbai Fire Brigade is the fire brigade serving the city of Mumbai, India. It is responsible for the provision of fire protection as well as responding to building collapses, drownings, gas leakage, oil spillage, road and rail accidents, bird and animal rescues, fallen trees and taking appropriate action during natural disasters.

== History ==
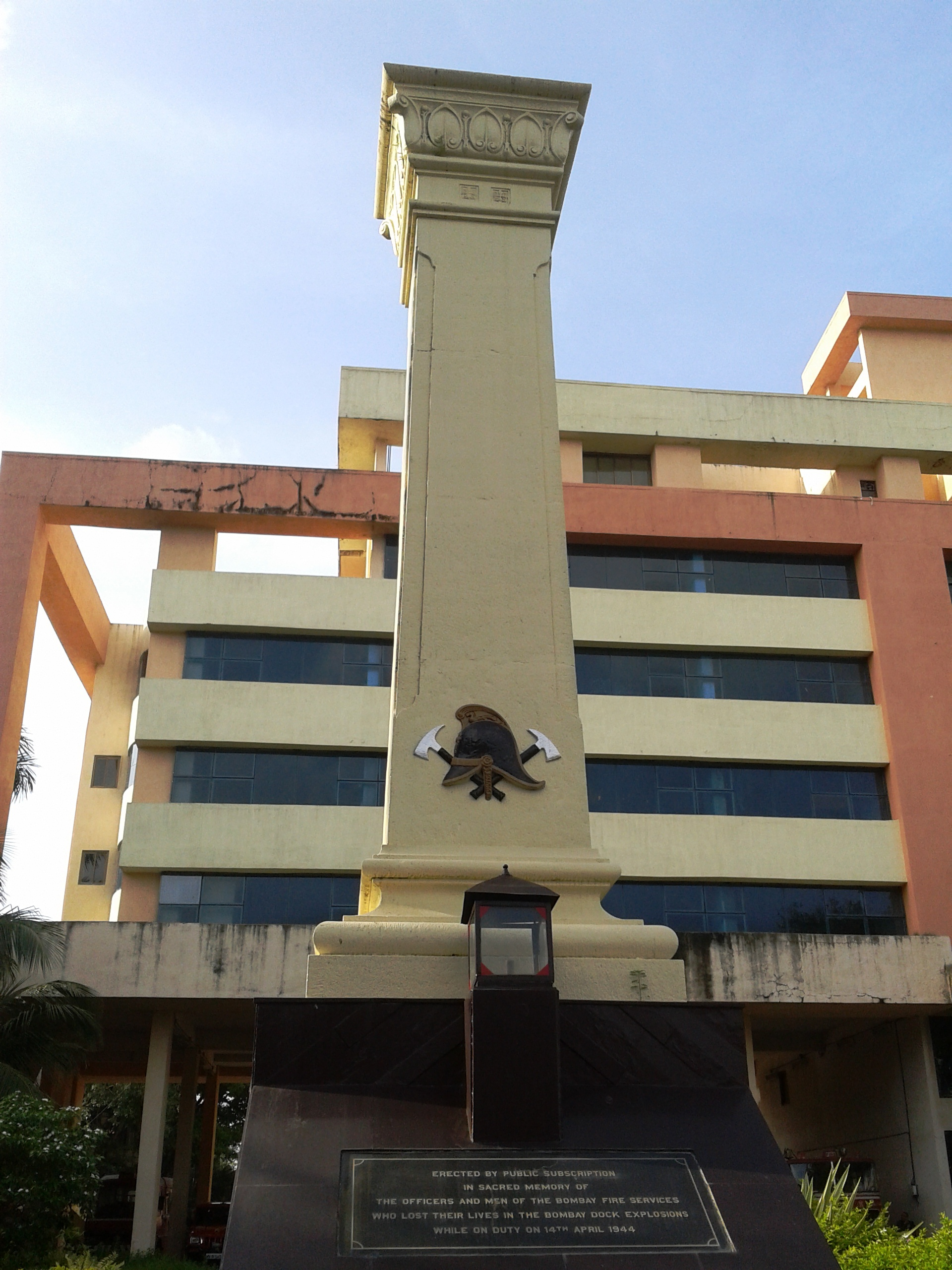
Firefighters Memorial outside the Byculla Headquarters

Fire protection in Bombay began in 1777, when locals were allotted Rs. 4 per day for handling carts and horse chariots which were used to extinguish fires. The Bombay fire brigade started as a part-time police function in 1855. A regular fire service with horse-drawn fire engines began under control of the Commissioner of Police. In 1864, a commission was appointed to report the organisation of fire service and a police officer was sent to England to qualify himself as captain of the fire brigade. Bombay Fire Brigade was placed jointly under the control of the Government and the Municipality in 1865. Fire protection became the responsibility of the Municipality on 1 April 1887.

In 1888 Bombay Municipal Corporation Act was enacted and protection of life and properties from fire become the duty of the corporation. W. Nicholls of the London Fire Brigade was appointed Chief Officer in 1890. The first motorized fire engine was commissioned in 1907. Also in 1907, the Bombay Salvage Corporation was formed, responsible for fire protection and salvage operations. Street fire alarms were installed in 1913. The brigade was motorised by replacing horse-drawn steam engines in 1920, and the Bombay Fire Brigade started ambulance services using six donated ambulances.

The Mumbai Fire Brigade observes Fire Safety Week from 14 to 20 April every year, in honour of the 66 fire-fighters who died in the 1944 Bombay Explosion.

In 1948, M.G. Pradhan was appointed Chief Fire Officer, the first Indian to hold this position. Since then, the brigade has been completely manned and controlled by Indians.

In 2016, the Mumbai Fire Brigade engaged actor Randeep Hooda to be their official brand ambassador, to conduct public fire safety programs and trainings.

== Jurisdiction and duties ==
The role and jurisdiction of the brigade are defined by the Maharashtra Fire Prevention and Life Safety Measures Act (2006), which designates the Municipal Corporation of Greater Mumbai (MCGM) as the local authority for meeting the needs of fire services in Mumbai. While the director of fire services, appointed by the State of Mahashtra, retains supervisory powers, the day-to-day functioning of the Mumbai Fire Brigade rests with the MCGM. The MCGM is responsible, under Chapter XIV of the Mumbai Municipal Corporation Act, 1888, for the following functions and duties:

- Providing and maintaining fire hydrants;
- Creating, managing, and staffing a municipal fire brigade;
- Framing regulations governing fire services in Mumbai; ad
- Appointing a Chief of the fire brigade.

The Maharashtra Fire Prevention and Life Safety Measures Act (2006) further lays down that the MCGM, like other municipal authorities in Maharashtra, is responsible for monitoring preventive measures to secure fire safety, such as inspecting and licensing buildings, as well as conducting fire-fighting services. In addition to fire fighting services, the Mumbai Fire Brigade provides support during seasonal flooding, as well as rescue and relief services.

In conjunction with the MCGM, the Mumbai Fire Brigade has prepared a Fire Hazard Response and Mitigation plan for the city of Mumbai, to address potential emergencies and hazards.

== Organisation ==
The head of the Mumbai Fire Brigade is the chief fire officer, who is in charge of fire services for the Mumbai Metropolitan area. This area is further divided into six regions, each in the charge of a deputy fire officer. The regions are headquartered at Byculla, Wadala, Marol, Borivali, Mankhurd, and Vikhroli. Each of these regions are further divided into divisions, with each division headed by a divisional fire officer. Within each division are sub-divisions, each consisting of a few fire stations, managed by an additional division officer. Individual fire stations are managed by station officers. The chief fire officer at present is Prabhat Rahangdale, who also serves as the director of the Maharashtra State Fire Services.

There are currently a total of 34 fire stations in Mumbai, with the Mumbai City headquarters in Byculla and Mumbai Suburban headquarters in Marol. The Mumbai Fire Brigade Control Room is located in Byculla, and is managed by a division officer responsible for mobilizing fire responses. The Mumbai Fire Brigade currently has a total of 1686 fire-fighters, 483 driver operators, and over 300 officers commanding individual fire troops.

== Rank structure ==
Title	Explanation
Chief Fire Officer	Chief of Brigade. Highest ranking uniformed employee.
Joint Chief Fire Officer	Second in command of brigade. Mostly oversees operations of all branches/departments of the brigade.
Deputy Chief Fire Officer	7 positions, each in charge of one command of the brigade.
Deputy Chief Fire Officer (Training)	1 position, responsible for operations of the fire academy.
Assistant Chief Fire Officer	Operate under the respective DFCO's command.
Divisional Fire Officer	11 positions, each leads one of the 11 divisions of the fire brigade.
Assistant Divisional Fire Officer	16 positions. Generally is the Commander of a Subdivision.
Station Officer	54 positions + 1 floater. Commander in charge of a fire station at all times.
Assistant Station Officer	212 positions + 2 floaters. Second in command of a fire station on one duty shift.
Sub Officer	66 positions, leads a firefighter company.
Driver Operator	483 positions. Drives the truck and operates specialised equipment.
Leading Fireman/EMT	243 positions. Seniormost non officer firefighter of the company, acts as officer in charge in absence of the SO.
Fireman/EMT	More than 1686 positions. Firefighter.

== Equipment, training, and budget ==
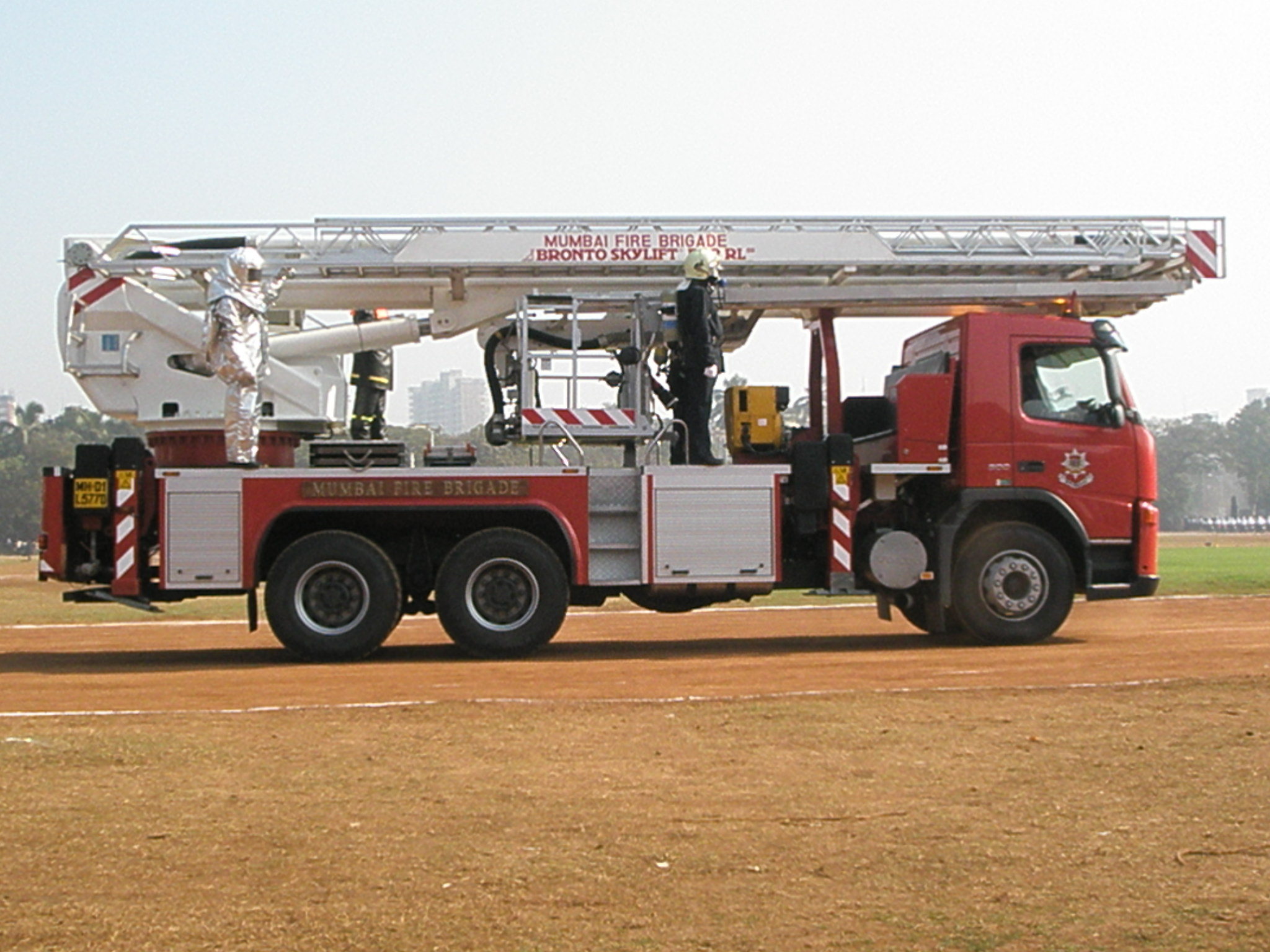
Mumbai Fire Brigade's Bronto sky lift for skyscrapers

=== Equipment ===
Fire stations are equipped with specialised equipment, such as firefighting and rescue vehicles, Ambulances, breathing apparatus, hydraulic rescue tools, electric chain saws, concrete or steel cutters, chemical protective suits, fire proximity suits, rescue rocket devices, self/rope rescue devices and search cameras.

The Mumbai Fire Brigade's first response vehicles are fire fighting trucks known as Motor Pumps, equipped with ladders, water tanks, and hydraulic rescue tools. Currently, the Mumbai Fire Brigade uses MPs manufactured by Tata and MAN. For larger fires, the Mumbai Fire Brigade uses brigades known as 'Jumbo Tankers' which have the capacity to hold between 14,000 and 18,000 litres of water. The Mumbai Fire Brigade also uses a number of specialised ladder trucks, for high-rise fires, manufactured by Volvo, MAN, and Mercedes-Benz. These include trucks with aerial ladder platforms, turntable ladders and hydraulic platforms. The Mumbai Fire Brigade's fleet currently consists of 56 fire engines, 21 jumbo tankers, and 18 specialised vehicles including 6 hydraulic platforms. The brigade also has 29 ambulances, and 6 beach safety units.

In 2016, the Mumbai Fire Brigade tested a Royal Enfield motorcycle, modified with fire fighting equipment, to tackle fires in places with narrow and limited access.

In 2019, the Mumbai Fire Brigade tested a fire fighting robot equipped with thermal imaging cameras, using it to help douse a fire at the MTNL Building in Bandra West. The apparatus is used to help identify people and objects in low visibility conditions and can spout water to assist in dousing fires. Fire fighters are also equipped with breathing apparatuses to enable them to enter buildings. In 2019 the Mumbai Fire Brigade acquired a number of additional specialised tools and equipment, including a vehicle designed or fighting fires caused by biological, chemical, and other hazardous materials.

The Mumbai Fire Brigade has gradually reduced maintenance on fire hydrants in the city, with information obtained under the Right to Information Act revealing that in 2009, 1503 of the total of 10,371 fire hydrants are functional.

=== Training ===
Currently, on joining the brigade, firemen undergo six months of intensive training, followed by refresher courses of three months on promotions. Firemen also conduct a daily drill of one and a half hours, to practice and upgrade skills. Additional training is undergone when the Mumbai Fire Brigade upgrades equipment.

In 2017, the Mumbai Fire Brigade began to recruit more women into fire fighting units, bringing the total number of female fire fighters up to 117 in that year. The Byculla Division of the Mumbai Fire Brigade is now integrated with male and female fire fighters, and currently has 110 female fire fighters assigned to it.

=== Budget ===
Budgetary allocations for the Mumbai Fire Brigade are contained within the budget of the MCGM. In February 2020, the MCGM presented a budget of 334.1 billion rupees for 2020–2021, of which 1.04 billion rupees were allocated to the Mumbai Fire Brigade. The 2020-2021 allocation halves the Mumbai Fire Brigade's budget when compared to previous years, with the MCGM stating that the reason for reducing the budget was the under-utilisation of funds by the Mumbai Fire Brigade.

== Emergency Response and Standard Operating Procedure ==
Until 2015, the Mumbai Fire Brigade relied on a colonial fire training manual established by the erstwhile British government, and focused heavily on fire fighting by using local water hydrants. The MCGM in 2015 established a committee of experts to study best practices in fire fighting and prepare a revised standard operating procedure for fire fighters, taking into account the reduced use of fire hydrants.

In 2016, the Mumbai Fire Brigade adopted a revised standard operating procedure, consisting of an eight-step process to respond to a fire call. These steps are: call received; call verification, despatch and mobilization of resources, preliminary assessment, arrival and initial assessment, line of action, reinforcement (if required) and demobilization.

The 2016 Standard Operation Procedure also establishes a five-level classification for fires, in order to determine the best response. Level I fires are treated as minor emergency calls; Level II fires are a medium emergency call; level III fires are a major emergency call; level IV are a serious emergency call and level V fires are a brigade call. For all fire classed Level III and above, the Chief Fire Officer is in command at the ground of the fire, and the Standard Operating Procedure also establishes the duties and responsibilities of other fire officers for each category of fire.

== Major and notable incidents ==
- Bombay Dock Explosion (1944):

On 14 April 1944 the freighter SS Fort Stikine, carrying a mixed cargo of cotton bales, gold and ammunition (including around 1,400 tons of explosives), caught fire and was destroyed in two giant blasts, scattering debris, sinking surrounding ships and setting fire to the surrounding area, killing around 800 people. The Bombay Fire Brigade tried to control the fire under control, at the cost of 66 lives. Preserved in the fire station at Byculla is a Leyland fire engine that took part in fighting the fire. Fire Safety Week is held from 14 to 20 April every year, in honour of the 66 fire-fighters who died in the Bombay Explosion.

- Terrorist Attacks (2008):

On 26 November 2008, the Mumbai Fire Brigade was one of several emergency services that responded when armed terrorists attacked multiple sites in the south of Mumbai, including the Taj Mahal Hotel, Hotel Trident, the Chhatrapati Shivaji Railway Terminus, the Leopold Cafe, Nariman House, and Bade Miyan Gali. The attacks result in significant fire damage in particular to the Taj Mahal Hotel's upper floors. 1200 firemen responded to the fires as the attacks were ongoing. In response to their service, the MCGM announced that it would present firemen with gallantry awards. The lack of protective equipment, including bullet proof vests, was indicated following this incident, which resulted in upgrades to the fire fighting equipment.

- Fires at Mumbai Mantralaya (2012 and 2013)

In 2012, the Mumbai Fire Brigade responded to a fire at the Mantralaya in Mumbai, which houses the administrative functions of the Maharashtra government. The fire resulted in the deaths of three people, with fifteen more injured and a number of vital government documents and records destroyed. The Mumbai Fire Brigade was assisted in fire relief efforts by the Indian Navy, and the Mumbai Police's anti-terror forces. The Mumbai Fire Brigade and MCGM subsequently submitted a report indicating that the cause of the fire was related to the presence of highly-flammable materials, including LPG cylinders, on the upper floors of the building.

In 2013, a second fire broke out in the Mantralaya, while renovation work was underway to repair the damage caused by the 2012 fire. There were no injuries, and five fire tenders of the Mumbai Fire Brigade doused the fire.

- INS Sindurakshak explosion (2013)

On 14 August 2013, there were several ordnance explosions on board the INS Sindurakshak, a diesel-electric submarine of the Indian Navy that was docked at Mumbai. The Mumbai Fire Brigade responded at the docks, along with other fire tenders that remain at service in the Naval Dockyard at Mumbai; however, the INS Sindhurakshan sank shortly after.

- Andheri Lotus Park Fire (2014)

On 18 July 2014, a fire broke at around 11 am at the 22-storey Lotus Business Park Building in Andheri (West). The fire destroyed the upper two floors before the Fire Brigade brought it under control. About a dozen out of 30 firemen who had gone inside the building were trapped for hours on the rooftop, and Nitin Ivalekar, a 28-year-old fireman, died due to smoke inhalation.

- Kalbadevi Fire (2015)

In 2015, the Mumbai Fire Brigade responded to a fire that broke out in a multistorey building, Gokul Niwas, in Kalbadevi, Mumbai, which was caused by a short-circuit that ignited flammable chemicals stored in the building. Three fire officers, Deputy CFO Sudhir Amin, Station Officer MM Desai and Assistant Divisional Fire Officer SW Rane, were killed while fighting the fire, and Chief Fire Officer Sunil Nesarikar sustained serious injuries. Fire brigades were initially unable to respond to the fire because of vehicles, hand carts, and obstacles blocking the narrow roads leading to the building, and ultimately, only two brigades could simultaneously access the site of the fire. Following the incident, the MCGM established a seven-member panel to investigate the reason behind the multiple deaths of fire brigade officers in the incident.

- Metro House Fire (2016)

On 2 June 2016, at 4 pm, a major fire broke out at Metro House, which houses Cafe Mondegar, close to the Regal Cinema, at Colaba Causeway, a popular shopping district. There were 50 fire trucks, from every station of South Mumbai, which included jumbo-tanker aerial-ladder platforms, turn-table ladders, and regular fire trucks. The operation continued for almost 2 days, with fire tenders making refill trips.

- Kamala Mills Fire (2017)

On 29 December 2017, fires broke out at two restaurants, Mojo's Bistro and 1 Above, in a commercial shopping complex at Kamala Mills, resulting in the deaths of fourteen people and injuries to sixteen more, as well as extensive property damage. The Mumbai Fire Brigade responded to the incident, following which it instituted a technical investigation to examine the cause of the fire. The report filed due to this investigation indicated multiple failures in observing fire safety regulations. Following this report, a number of persons were arrested and charged by the Mumbai Police, including Fire Officer Rajendra Patil, who had certified the restaurants for compliance with fire safety regulations a week before the fire.

- MTNL Building Fire (2019):

On 22 July 2019, a fire broke out in the offices of Mahanagar Telephone Nigam Limited (MTNL), a state-owned telecommunications service provider. The building, located in Bandra, Mumbai, caught fire, trapping people on the roof of the nine-story building. The Mumbai Fire Brigade responded to the site with fourteen fire brigades, rescuing 84 people from the roof. There were no casualties, and one fireman sustained minor injuries.

- COVID-19 Pandemic (2020):

In response to the COVID-19 pandemic in India, the Mumbai Fire Brigade in conjunction with the MCGM worked to disinfect public spaces in Mumbai. The Mumbai Fire Brigade deployed 160 employees grouped into a total of 32 teams throughout the city. The COVID-19 response teams used the Mumbai Fire Brigade's quick response and mist fogging equipment to spray disinfectant in affected areas.

== Gallery ==
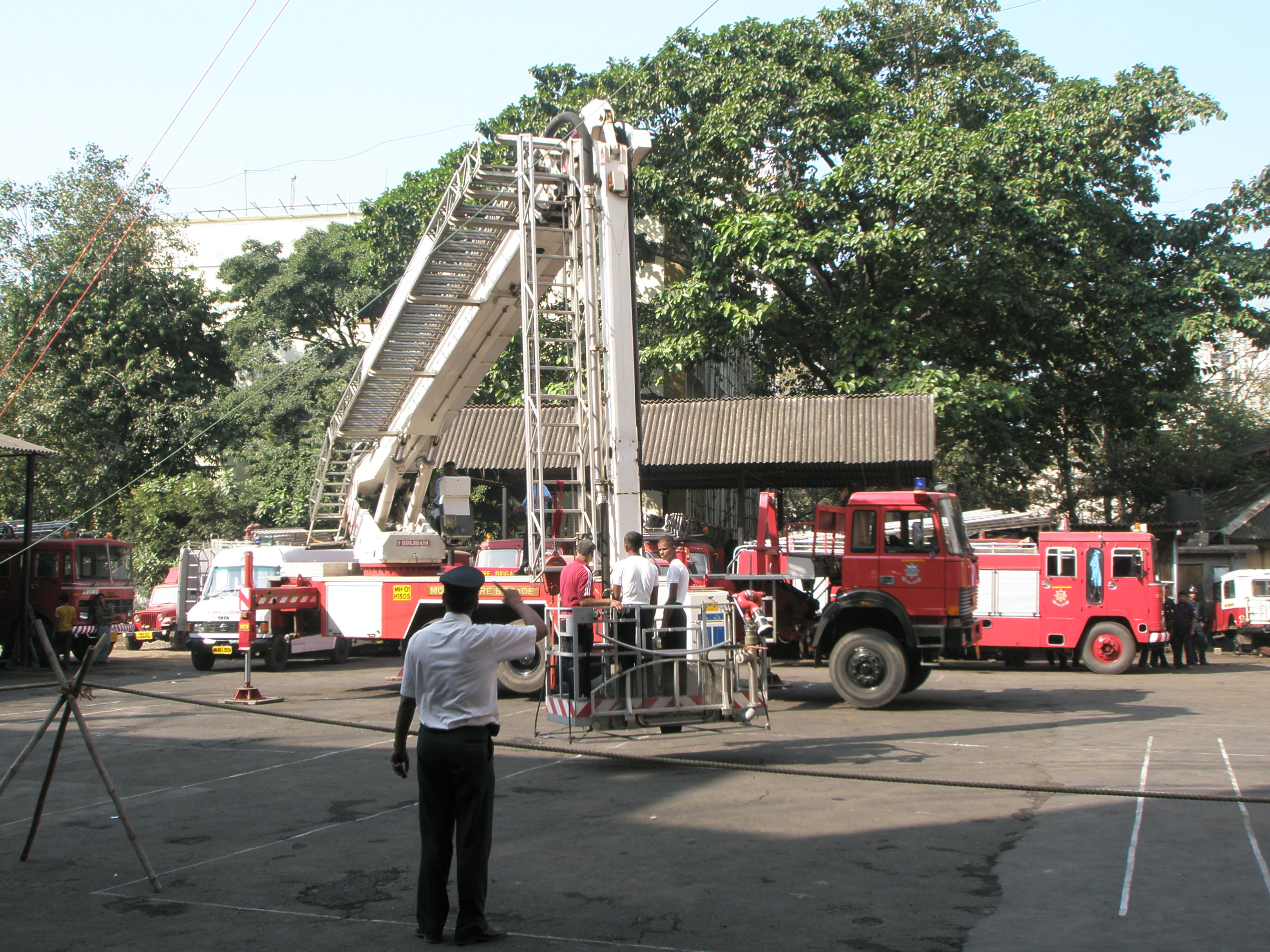
Bronto Skylift Telescoping articulated platform

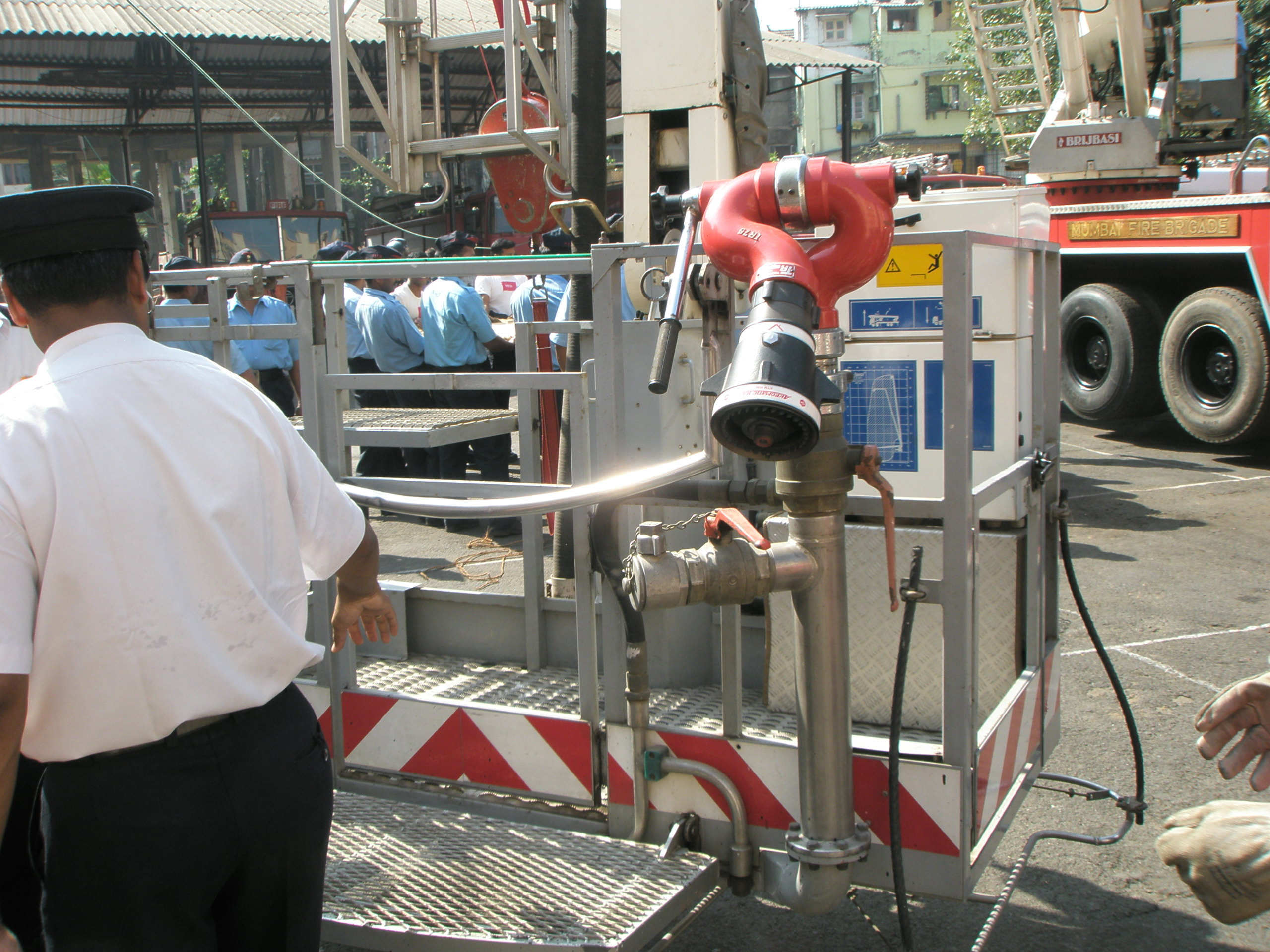
Close up of Hydraulic platform

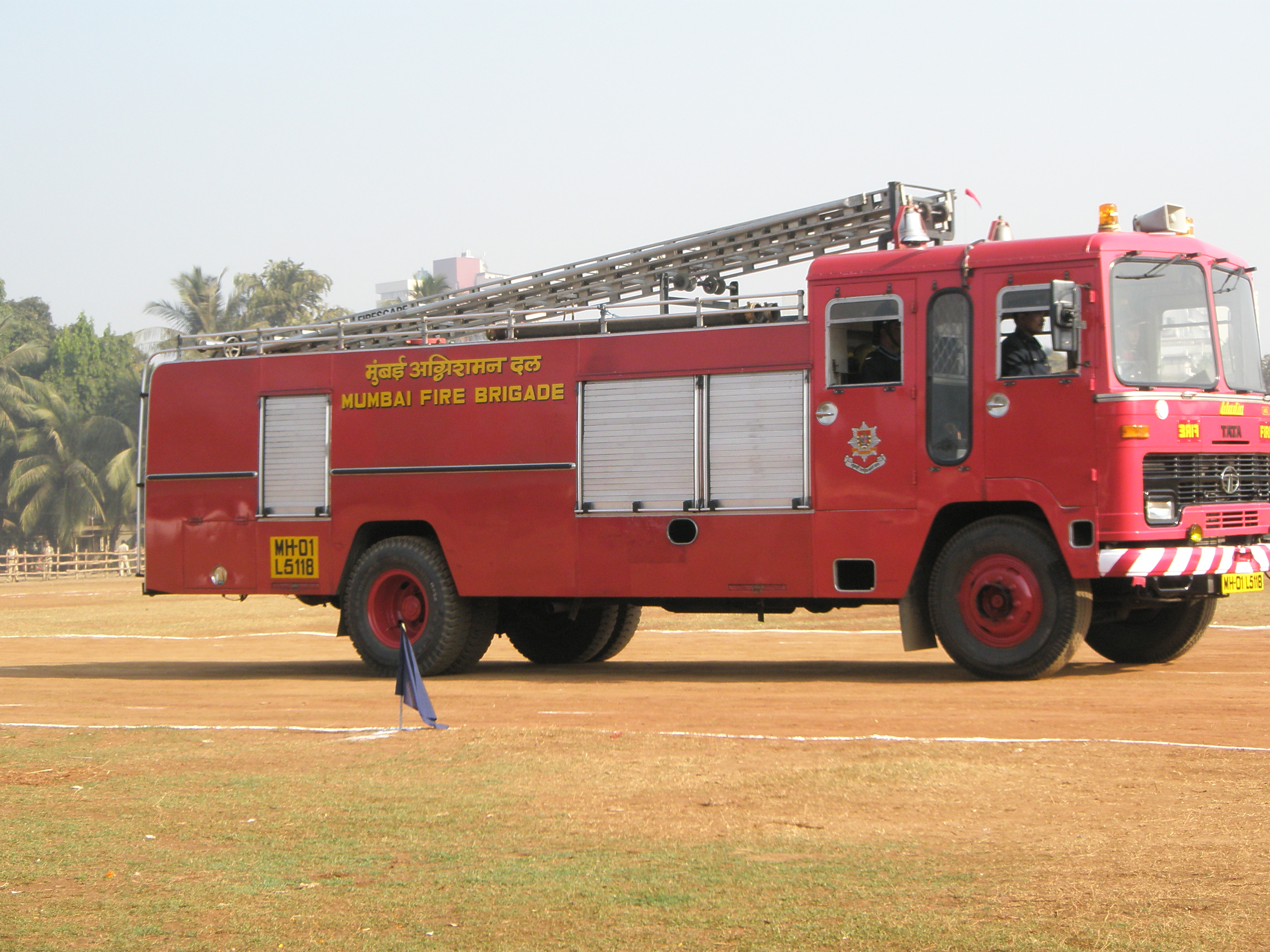
Fire truck for small buildings

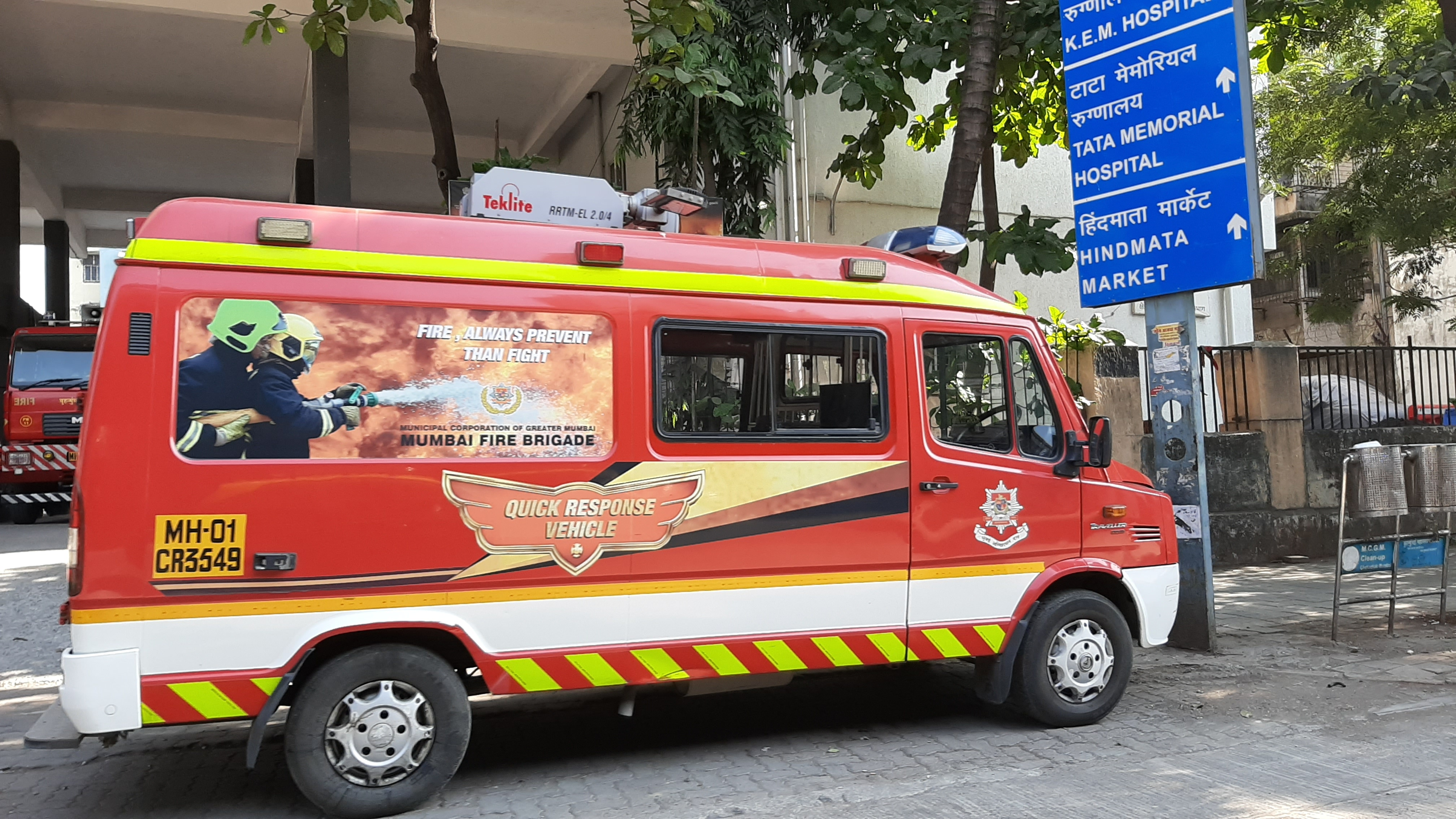
Force Traveller Mini fire tender of Mumbai Fire Brigade

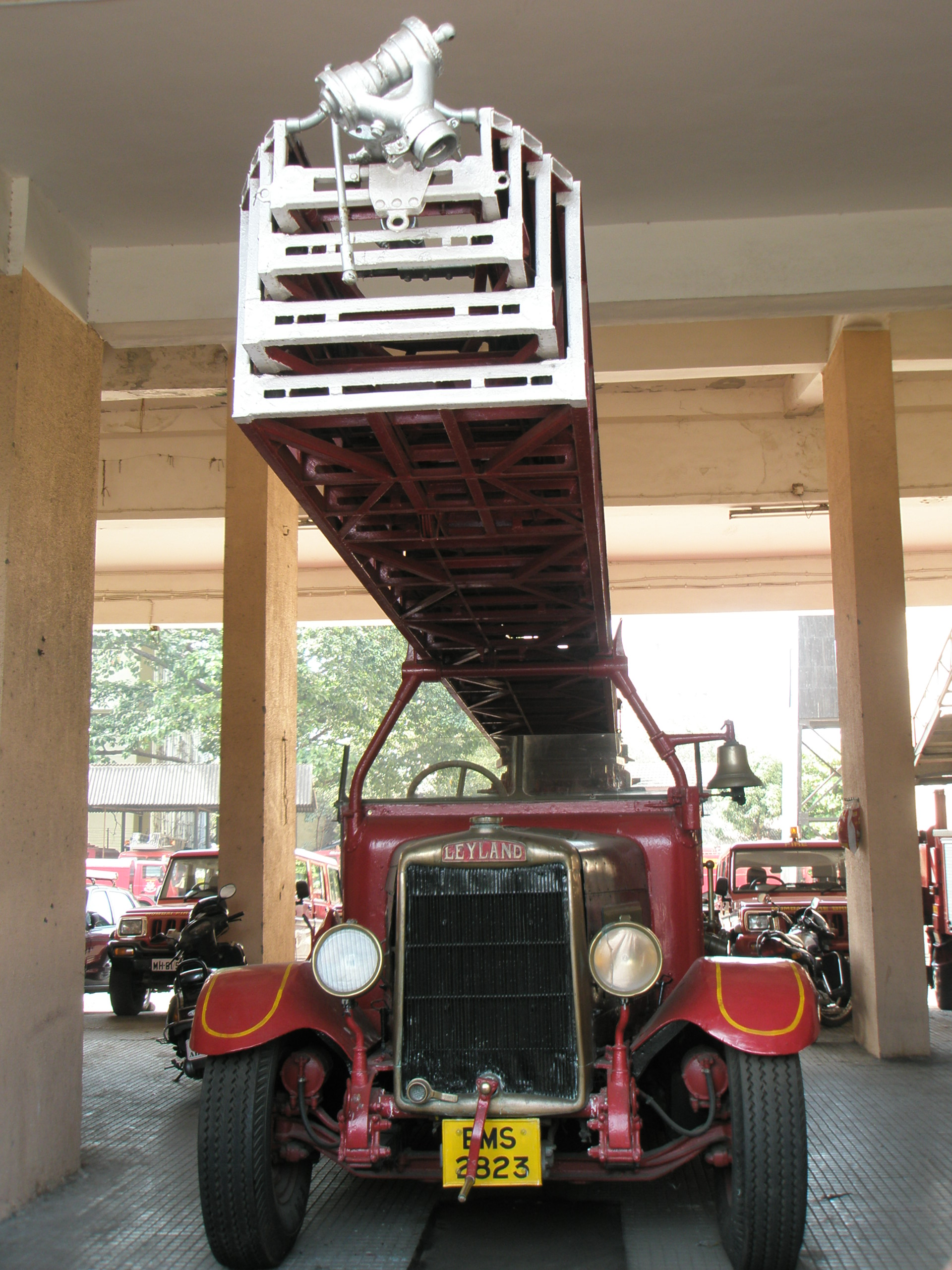
Antique fire engine

== See also ==
- History of Mumbai
- Maharashtra Police
- Mumbai Police
