= 1837 Surat fire =

Fire in British India

- Date: 24–26 April 1837
- Time: 5:00 pm IST on start date, to morning of end date
- Location: Surat, British India (now in Gujarat, India); 21°12′03″N 72°49′26″E
- Cause: House fire
- Deaths: More than 500
- Property damage: est. ₹4,686,500 (equivalent to ₹2,947,491,295 in 2023)

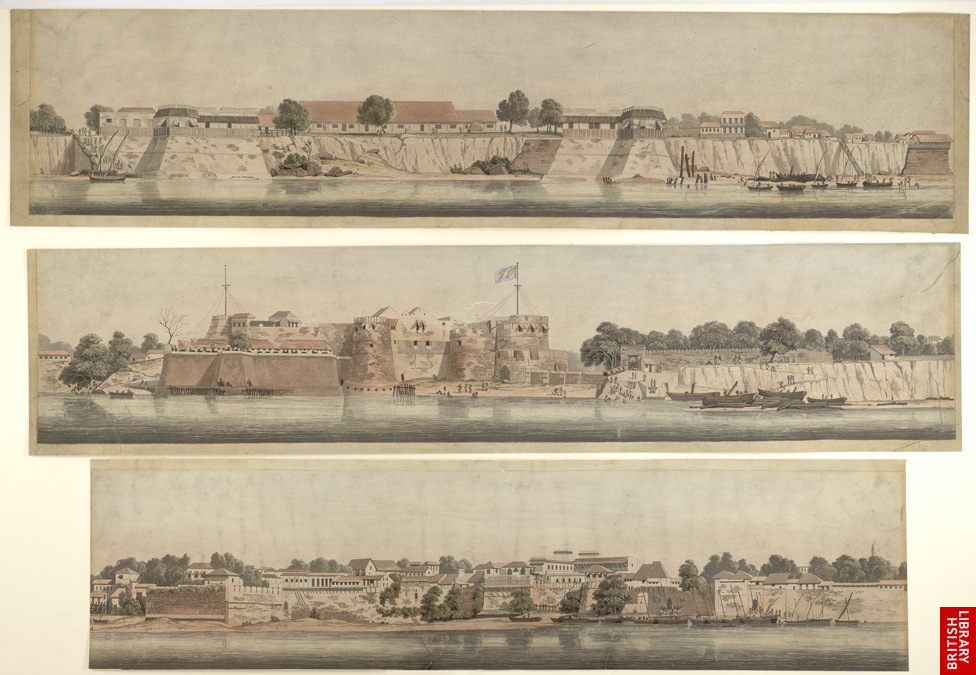
Surat circa 1830

In April 1837, a fire broke out in the Indian city of Surat, then under British East India Company rule. It resulted in more than 500 deaths and the destruction of 9,737 houses in a 9 3/4-mile (16 km) radius. It was the most destructive fire in the history of the city.

== Fire ==
At the time of the fire in 1837, Surat was under the control of the British East India Company. At 5 pm on 24 April, Monday, a jar of boiling pitch was spilt and some woodwork caught fire at a house of one of the leading Parsis in Machhalipith neighbourhood. The neighbours refused to allow the use of water from their wells to extinguish the fire. The fire quickly spread to the densely packed neighbouring houses, which had timber frames and wooden eaves overhanging the narrow streets. Within a few hours, the fire spread to an area of three miles (5 km) due to heavy wind from the north. At night, the large masses of smoke lit by the fire were visible from a distance of twenty to thirty miles (30 to 50 km). At daybreak on 25 April, the fire's spread shifted due to wind from the southwest. At about 2 pm, the fire was at its height. The fire declined thereafter and ended in the morning on 26 April. The fire had destroyed houses in a 9 3/4-mile (16 km) radius, about three-quarters (75%) of the city.

== Damage ==
Houses destroyed by fire in each neighbourhood of Surat
Neighbourhood	Houses destroyed
City	6250
Machhalipith	259
Rahia Soni Chaklo	647
Kelapith and Kanpith	1174
Rani Talav	363
Warifalia	998
Sangariawad	390
Bhagatalav	581
Kapatia Chaklo	876
Gopipura	892
Suburbs	3123
Navapura	1880
Haripura	68
Salabatpura	524
Begampura	721
Total	9373

Apart from the more than 500 people who died in the fire, an additional 49 were found dead. That number includes seven people who died due to the change in the fire's direction on 25 April, 32 people who died while saving their property, and ten people who had tried to save themselves by jumping in a pond or well.

The total economic loss could not be estimated. A total of 9,373 houses were destroyed. Of those, 6,250 were in the city proper and 3,123 in the suburbs. Placing the average cost of a house at ₹500 (equivalent to ₹314,466 in 2023), the total loss amounted to about ₹4,686,500 (equivalent to ₹2,947,491,295 in 2023).

== Relief ==
The British government granted ₹50,000 (equivalent to ₹31,446,616 in 2023) for relief, while private donors collected ₹125,000 (equivalent to ₹78,616,539 in 2023) in Bombay. £1,000 (equivalent to £96,800 in 2025) were collected in London for relief work.

== Aftermath ==
After the fire, Surat was affected by a heavy flood in August 1837. Due to these disasters, Parsi, Jain, and Hindu traders moved to Bombay. Later, Bombay surpassed Surat to become the major port of the west coast of India. The city continued to be affected by several fires in subsequent years.

== See also ==
- 2019 Surat fire
