= Zumba Dance Fitness Party =

- Genre: Dance; Fitness; Reality television
- Starring: See below
- Country of origin: India
- Original language: Hindi
- No. of seasons: 01

Production
- Production locations: Mumbai, India
- Camera setup: Single-camera
- Running time: 45 minutes approx.

Original release
- Network: Zoom
- Release: 2 April 2016 – present

Zumba Dance Fitness Party is an Indian Hindi dance fitness reality television series, which premiered on 2 April 2016 and is broadcast on Zoom. The series is a weekly series, airing on every Saturday. The series is a special six-episode series.

== Presentation ==
The series is co-hosted by Pallavi Sharda. The series features celebrities like director-actress Divya Khosla Kumar, chef Ranveer Brar and singer Palak Muchhal.
