= Movies Now =

Indian television channel

- Logo used since 2010
- Type: TV Channel
- Country: India
- Headquarters: Mumbai, Maharashtra, India

Programming
- Language: English
- Picture format: 1080i HDTV

Ownership
- Owner: The Times Group
- Sister channels: Times Now; ET Now; Zoom; Romedy Now; MN+ MNX; Mirror Now; Times Now Navbharat; ET Now Swadesh

History
- Launched: 19 December 2010; 15 years ago

Movies Now is an Indian Movies channel featuring Hollywood films. It was launched on 19 December 2010 with a picture quality of 1080i and 5.1 surround sound. It is also available in Tamil feed for specific movies. The channel is owned by The Times Group.

In June 2016, Times Network decided to launch another channel called Movies Now 2, which later renamed as MNX.

In July 2017, Movies Now 2 was rechristened into MNX channel in Hollywood. It has exclusive content licensing from films produced or distributed by Metro Goldwyn Mayer and has content licensing from Walt Disney Studios, Marvel Studios, 20th Century Studios, Paramount Pictures, Universal Pictures, Warner Bros and Lionsgate.

== See also ==
- &flix
- Star Movies
- Sony Pix
