= Romedy Now =

Indian television channel

- Logo used since 2019
- Country: India
- Broadcast area: Worldwide
- Headquarters: Mumbai, Maharashtra

Programming
- Language: English
- Picture format: 576i (SD) (2013-present)

Ownership
- Owner: The Times Group
- Sister channels: Times Now; Zoom; ET Now; Movies Now; MN+ MNX; Mirror Now

History
- Launched: 22 September 2013; 13 years ago

Links
- Website: Official Website

Romedy Now is an India-based English language television channel showing romantic comedy Hollywood films and shows. The channel, owned by the Bennett, Coleman and Co. Ltd, went on air and began telecasting from 22 September 2013. Its tagline is "Love Laugh Live".

== Former shows ==
=== Acquired shows ===
- 30 Rock
- 1600 Penn
- 2 Broke Girls
- Ally McBeal
- America's Funniest Home Videos
- Better Off Ted
- Back in the Game
- Dharma & Greg
- Everybody Loves Raymond
- Friends
- Friends with Better Lives
- Gilmore Girls
- Hot in Cleveland
- How I Met Your Mother
- Impractical Jokers
- Jane the Virgin
- Kitchen Confidential
- Little Big Shots
- Mike & Molly
- Parks and Recreation
- Suits
- Selfie
- Stacked
- Shameless
- The Middle
- The Ellen DeGeneres Show
- Will & Grace
- Witches of East End

== Romedy Now HD ==
Romedy Now HD
- Country: India
- Broadcast area: India, Nepal, Americas, Worldwide
- Headquarters: Mumbai, Maharashtra

Programming
- Language: English
- Picture format: 1080i (HD)

Ownership
- Owner: The Times Group

History
- Launched: 22 September 2013; 13 years ago
- Closed: 1 August 2021; 5 years ago
- Replaced by: Times Now Navbharat HD

Romedy Now's HD counterpart, originally known as Romedy Now+, was launched along with Romedy Now. It was later shut down on 1 August 2021 and rebranded as Times Now Navbharat HD.

== See also ==
- Movies Now
