= 2023 Kohima fire =

Major fire in Kohima

- Date: 27 February 2023
- Time: 4:50 p.m (IST)
- Duration: 3 hours (under control); Over 12 hours (fully extinguished)
- Location: Kohima, Nagaland, India; 25.657829°N 94.101012°E
- Type: Structure fire
- Cause: Suspected electrical short circuit; under investigation

On 27 February 2023, a massive fire broke in Kohima, the capital of Nagaland causing complete damage to Mao Market and NN Market, one of the biggest commercial areas in Kohima.

Over 200 shops were gutted which is suspected to have been caused by an electrical short circuit as per police report. The incident took place on the polling day of the 2023 Nagaland Legislative Assembly election.

== Market ==
The Mao Market was opened on 20 May 1999 by Neiphiu Rio, the then-Home Minister of Nagaland. It housed a variety of shops including vegetables, meat products, groceries, clothing and cosmetics.

== Fire ==
The fire reportedly broke out at approximately 5:00 p.m. on Monday, 27 February 2023. The fire was first spotted on the ground floor of the three-storeyed Mao Market commercial building.

As the building housed structures made of wood, the fire spread quickly, destroying the entire wooden structure and causing substantial damage to the adjacent houses in the area. Locals alleged that the fire services failed to arrive in time though the area is located opposite to the Nagaland Fire and Emergency services station, further aggravating the situation.

Around 150 firefighters and over 20 firetenders from across Kohima, including those from the Assam Rifles and fire engines from Khuzama, Chiephobozou, Chümoukedima and Dimapur were brought in to fight the blaze.

Patients at the adjacent Bethel Medical Centre were evacuated to Oking Hospital.

At its peak, the inferno rose to over 80 feet and the flames were visible from many parts of Kohima and surrounding towns and villages.

== Aftermath ==
More than 200 shops in the commercial area and several private residences were destroyed. The next day, 28 February, Nagaland Chief Minister Neiphiu Rio visited the site and met with the affected families whose shops and residences were burnt down.
