= Bangalore circus fire =

Fire in a circus in Bangalore, India

1981 Bangalore Circus Fire
- Date: 7 February 1981
- Location: Venus Circus, Bangalore, Karnataka, India
- Cause: Overheated electric cables leading to ignition of tent canvas
- Deaths: 92
- Injuries: 300

A fire occurred on 7 February 1981 at the Venus Circus in Bangalore, Karnataka, India, where more than 92 people died, the majority of them being children.

== Incident ==
The day of the fire was the last day of the circus, with school children being the bulk of the audience as the gates had been left open by circus management and many were accompanied by teachers or parents. Eyewitnesses later stated that shortly after the trapeze artist landed cries of "Benki, benki!" ("Fire, fire!") were heard throughout the tent.

The fire swept the main circus tent, which crashed down in flames onto a crowd of about 4,000 people, setting off a stampede towards the exits. The cause of the fire was speculated to be a discarded cigarette or an electric short circuit. The blaze erupted at the back gate as a three-hour matinee had ended and the spectators were moving towards the exits. Apart from the spectators inside, another huge crowd was waiting outside the tent for the next show. The flames quickly spread through the canvas top and wooden bleachers, whipped by strong winds. It took only 15 minutes for the fire to consume the tent, long before the first fire engines arrived. Parents, passers-by, and auto rickshaw drivers also attempted to pull children and others out of the tent, with some becoming victims themselves after being overwhelmed by the fire.

The 4,000-seater spectator gallery was also destroyed during the fire. Help could not be sought immediately as the telephone lines were dead. Many of the female performers ran into the fire to save the children. Animals were not hurt as they were not inside the ring at the time, and employees pulled caged tigers and lions away from the blaze. Elephants and horses broke their tethers and escaped to safety.

== Victims ==
The fire disaster claimed 92 lives and 300 others were injured. 56 of those killed, and many of those hurt, were school children. More children were killed in the stampede than by the fire. 21 adults who died were mothers and teachers who had brought the children to the special Saturday matinee for children. Several of the burn victims were charred beyond recognition. A total of 119 patients were treated in the Burns centre at Victoria Hospital. 14 patients with more than 80 percent burns died within 48 hours of the disaster. 32 patients were operated by skin grafting or flap procedures.

== Investigation ==
An inquiry commission was formed, with the then high court Judge Justice NR Kudoor in the head position. It later found that high-tension electric cables that had been strung overhead of the circus tent were the cause of the fire.
