= MNX (TV channel) =

Indian television channel

- Logo used since 2017
- Country: India
- Broadcast area: India, Nepal, Bangladesh, Sri Lanka, Myanmar, North America, Thailand and Singapore
- Headquarters: Mumbai, Maharashtra, India

Programming
- Language: English
- Picture format: 1080i HDTV

Ownership
- Owner: The Times Group
- Sister channels: Times Now Navbharat; Zoom; ET Now; Movies Now; Romedy Now; Mirror Now; MNX; MN+ ET Now Swadesh

History
- Launched: 24 June 2016; 10 years ago
- Former names: Movies Now 2 (2016–2017)

MNX is an Indian English language movie television channel. It was launched on 24 June 2016 as Movies Now 2 from The Times Group. On 15 July 2017, it was rebranded as MNX channel, focused on Hollywood films.

It has exclusive content licensing from films produced or distributed by Metro Goldwyn Mayer and has content licensing from Universal Pictures, Walt Disney Studios, Marvel Studios, 20th Century Studios, Warner Bros and Paramount Pictures.

== See also ==
- Movies Now
- The Times Group
