= 2006 Kolkata leather factory fire =

- Date: 22 November 2006
- Time: 2:30 IST
- Location: West Bengal, India
- Deaths: 10-12
- Injuries: 18

The 2006 Kolkata leather factory fire was a deadly industrial fire that occurred in West Bengal, India, on 22 November 2006. The fire broke out in a leather bag factory located in the Tannix International, Topsia, in the South 24 Parganas district in Greater Kolkata area, and generated a wave of criticism of the poor safety standards in place among the various factories in the country.

The industrial fire claimed the lives of at least ten people, who were unable to escape because the doors were locked shut illegally. Authorities, in response to local residents' angry criticism, admitted that the emergency response to the accident was substandard. Two separate investigations were launched. One inquiry focused on the fire itself, while the other sought to ascertain criminal responsibility for the disaster as well as the operation of the illegal factory. The results of both are either pending or have yet to be released to the general public.

== Background ==
Investigators confirmed that the site of the fire had been used as an illegal factory to manufacture leather bags. The factory was located on the third floor of a four-story building, which also featured residential units. Investigators determined that the first and second floors of the structure housed additional illegal factories. The factory destroyed in the fire was found to be owned and operated by Tenex Exports, and all of the people who were killed or injured in the fire slept in the factory at night, a situation that is not considered unusual in India. There was just one emergency exit, and 40 workers were housed in the structure at the time of the fire, and the owner had locked the factory at night to prevent workers from running away with leather goods. The building was located in the Tannix International, Topsia, in the South 24 Parganas district of Greater Kolkata region.

== Event and emergency response ==
The interior of the factory after the fire had been extinguished.

The fire broke out in the factory at around 2:30 IST, as workers slept. Once they became aware of the blaze, the employees found they were unable to break through the factory's locked doors. Five fire tenders were sent to the scene, but by the time they arrived, local residents had broken down two locked gates and already rescued the surviving workers. These impromptu rescue efforts were delayed however, when an individual carrying keys to open the door nervously dropped them while attempting to open the gate. At least 10 people were dead by the time rescuers reached the factory's interior, with a further eighteen injured. The survivors, many suffering from burns over 70 percent of their bodies, were taken to the National Medical College and Hospital, where victims had to be left on the floor due to a shortage of beds. The hospital did not have a burns unit, and the only treatments available at the hospital were ointments and saline drips. The patients were eventually moved to other hospitals. Local MLA Javed Khan later said that the death toll is actually at least twelve, but there has been no official confirmation of this. The Rapid Action Force was also deployed to maintain calm.

=== Criticisms of the emergency response ===
People living in the vicinity of the illegal factory said that the number of deaths might have been reduced had the fire service responded promptly. They claimed that the fire brigade failed to send personnel or equipment to the scene until more than an hour after the brigade first received word of the fire. Residents also claimed that it was only after the police arrived and requested fire service backup that any help was sent. In addition, some on the scene reported an inadequate number of ambulances. The city's mayor admitted to this lapse the following morning. Local people also complained that the victims should never have been taken to the Calcutta National Medical College, but that they should have been transported directly to hospitals with burns units.

== Investigations ==
=== Accident investigation ===
An investigation has been launched to determine the cause of the fire as well as the reason the building had been locked from the outside. To this end, the building was inspected by the KMC, and was subsequently scheduled to be demolished on Thursday, 23 November. However, the structure is standing as of 2007. Although no actual cause of the fire has been established, it has been noted that large quantities of inflammable materials, such as adhesives, were stored inside the building. It was also revealed that the factory experienced a similar fire two years previously, but on that occasion there were no fatalities.

=== Criminal investigation ===
A separate criminal investigation focused on the illegal factory itself. Almost all factories and homes in the area were illegal and unauthorised, and do not follow building codes and sanctions. Mayor Bikash Ranjan Bhattacharya said action would be taken against the owners of the factory and house, and Superintendent of Police of South 24 Parganas S. N. Gupta said that the owners of the building would be arrested. Investigation has shown that the Kolkata Municipal Corporation (KMC) issued notices to the building on three separate occasions, in 1988, 1989, and 1992, yet took no further action. It has been shown, however, that the KMC also approved trade licences for two businesses to operate from the building. The owner of the building, Khurshid Alam, has had a police complaint filed against him by the fire department for illegal construction charges. Mohammed Sagir Ahmed and Mohammed Asif, the owners of Tenex Exports, also face related charges. Both investigations are ongoing.

== Aftermath ==
The day after this tragedy, workers in the unorganized leather industry of Topsia area held protest rallies demanding compensation for the relatives of the deceased workers, better working conditions and a probe into the fire mishap. The mayor of Kolkata convened an all-party meeting to discuss the incident and also promised to initiate a drive demolish illegal constructions in the area. The labour inspectors inspected the building and declared the factory as illegal. Even though the building was declared illegal and unsafe, a month later, the police raided the house and found that another leather factory was operating behind closed doors in the ground floor of the building. The civic officials issued a notice to stop any work in the building. Though local residents alleged that clandestine work started in the building with the help of local MLA, Javen Khan, Khan himself blamed it rather on the police.

In 2008, two more fire mishaps occurred in the leather industries in the area, one in the month of March and the other in June: a total of nine people got injured in these two incidents. Even though fire safety licenses and insurances for the workers of the leather factories were made mandatory after the fire incident of 2006, none of the authorities—the municipal corporation, the services department of the state government, and the police—ensured that these were actually followed by the factories. The local residents claimed that the owner of the factory that was impacted in the fire incident of 2006, now operates from another address of the same area. According to fire brigade officials, the Topsia area along with nearby Tiljala and Tangra forms the most fire-prone area of the city, and that around three to four fires break out every week, though they do not get reported in the media as there is no loss of life.
