= 2013 Kolkata market fire =

Building fire in Kolkata, India

- Location of the West Bengal
- Date: 27 February 2013
- Location: Kolkata, West Bengal, India
- Deaths: 19
- Injuries: 17
- Missing: 0
- Property damage: Market

The 2013 Kolkata market fire was a fire in a five-storeyed marketplace in Kolkata, the capital city of West Bengal, India, on 27 February 2013. An estimated 19 people, who were mostly labourers working in the market were killed in the fire. The fire may have been initiated by a short circuit in the first floor of the market. Other major fires in Kolkata include the 2011 AMRI hospital fire accident that killed 90 people and 2018 Bagri Market fire in which no people were killed but lasted for four days which destroyed nearly 1000 shops.

== Fire ==
The Surya Sen street market was an illegal market operating in the area of Surya Sen street. An estimated 19 people, who were mostly labourers working in the market were killed in the fire, and 17 people were admitted to the hospital in critical condition. Most of the people who were killed in the fire were shopkeepers and labourers who stayed overnight in the market. The accident occurred at around 3:50 in the morning. The rescue operations took nearly 3 hours for the 20 fire tenders who fought the fire. The rescue operations were hampered by smoke in the narrow lanes leading to the fire and in the only exit available in the building. Eyewitness have alleged that the fire brigade were late and the rescue operations were delayed as gas masks and gas cutters were not brought along. Initial reports suggest that fire might have been initiated by a fire in the eatery.

The market fire is the second major one in Kolkata after the 2011 AMRI hospital fire accident that killed 90 people. The Hon'ble Chief Minister, Mamata Banerjee, admitted lapses on implementing the fire safety steps from the 2011 incident. The Chief Minister of the state, Mamata Banerjee visited the site afterwards.

== Post-fire ==
In the aftermath of the fire, the market was closed for entry for days. Shop owners were allowed to set up temporary shops on the pavements adjoining the market. While the exact value of losses of the shop owners are not known, it is inferred that many of the small shop owners have lost their lifetime savings in the fire. Many of them were reported to be on the lookout for alternate employment and seeking relief from the state government.

== See also ==
- 2011 AMRI hospital fire
- 2018 Bagri Market Fire
