= Zoom (Indian TV channel) =

Indian television channel

Zoom TV
- Country: India
- Broadcast area: India; Bangladesh; Nepal; Sri Lanka (discontinued 04/01/2023); Worldwide
- Headquarters: Mumbai, Maharashtra, India

Programming
- Languages: English; Hindi
- Picture format: 4:3 (576i, SDTV)

Ownership
- Owner: The Times Group
- Sister channels: Times Now; ET Now; Times Now Navbharat; Movies Now; Romedy Now; MN+ Movies Now 2 Mirror Now; ET Now Swadesh; 1Sports

History
- Launched: 20 September 2004; 22 years ago

Links
- Website: www.zoomtventertainment.com

Availability

Streaming media
- Zoom TV Live

Zoom is a Mumbai-based Indian glamour and entertainment television channel primarily covering Bollywood. The channel was launched in September 2004 and caters primarily to urban audiences. It started out as a music/Bollywood/serial channel, but quickly pulled serials off the air, becoming a music and Bollywood news channel within months. It is part of The Times Group, one of India's largest media conglomerates. An internet pioneer, it has been available on mobile internet since March 2009, and later airs all songs focussed on Bollywood, Qawwalis, Rock, Sufi, Ghazals, English, Punjabi pop, Indian pop, UK Asian, Haryanvi, Rajasthani, K-pop, Pahari, Bhojpuri in a all types of current, new, old and evergreen mode only and relaunched its old programmes focussing on lifestyle, health, astrology, fashion, entertainment-based interests, gossips, talk shows, travel programmes, reality shows,wellness, biography and events and also airs Bollywood, Hollywood, Foreign and South movies.

== Shows broadcast ==
- Cutting Pyaar
- Mirchi top 20
- Planet Bollywood
- Telly Top Up
- Request Kiya Hai
- Music Takatak
- Mann Ki Dhun
- Thank God It's Fryday
- Likes Bajao
- 30 Mein 30
- Times Celebex
- Top 50 Trending
- Star of the Month
- Kosmiic Chat
- Kya Kahein
- Gehraiyaan
- Zumba Dance Fitness Party
- Toofani Hits
- fashion superstar
- by invite only
- The Next 100
