= Zenga TV =

India's largest OTT player

- Headquarters: singapore
- Area served: International
- Key people: Shabir Momin,
- Industry: OTT, Online Streaming, Digital Entertainment, low bitrate streaming
- Website: www.zengatv.com
- Launched: 2009
- Current status: Online

Zenga TV is India's largest OTT player and digital video company, a brand of Zenga Media Pte Ltd. Zenga received the rights to telecast the 2012 tour of the Indian cricket team in Sri Lanka.
