= Mirror Now =

Indian English-language news television channel

- Country: India
- Broadcast area: Global
- Headquarters: Mumbai, Maharashtra

Programming
- Language: English
- Picture format: 1080i (HDTV); 576i (SDTV)

Ownership
- Owner: The Times Group
- Parent: Times Network
- Sister channels: Times Now; Times Now Navbharat; ET Now; ET Now Swadesh; Zoom

History
- Launched: 1 November 2015
- Former names: MagicBricks Now (2015–2017)

Links
- Website: timesnownews.com

Mirror Now is an English-language news television channel owned by The Times Group and run by Times Network. Developed in collaboration with the portal MagicBricks, it debuted on 1 November 2015, as MagicBricks Now, a niche channel devoted to real estate and property news.

The channel changed its name to Mirror Now on 23 March 2017, and adopted a general news format with a clear emphasis on social justice, civic issues, urban governance, and citizen rights.

== History ==
Under its founding executive editor, Faye D'Souza, Mirror Now gained significant viewership and social media traction, particularly through flagship shows like The Urban Debate. There were changes in the channel's leadership after D'Souza resigned in 2019. Shreya Dhoundial was named Executive Editor in 2022.

Times Network first declared on 20 March 2025, that Mirror Now would no longer operate independently and would instead combine its main functions with those of its larger sister channel, Times Now.

However, Mirror Now was formally relaunched by Times Network in June 2026 with a redesigned identity and content philosophy. Under the slogan "One Channel. World of News," the channel broadened its focus to include young, urban, and technologically savvy viewers. It positioned itself as a premium multi-interest destination that combined news, business, culture, entertainment, and technology.

== Notable Programming ==
- The Urban Debate – The channel's premier interactive debate program, which tackles public policy, governance, and civic issues, hosted by Shreya Dhoundial.
- The Last Word – Am analytical section assessing the main news stories of the day.
- India This Morning – compilation of morning news that covers both domestic and international events.
