= ET Now =

Indian business television channel

ET NOW
- Country: India
- Broadcast area: Worldwide
- Headquarters: Mumbai, Maharashtra, India

Programming
- Language: English
- Picture format: 4:3 (576i, SDTV)

Ownership
- Owner: The Times Group
- Sister channels: Times Now; Movies Now; Zoom; ET Now Swadesh; Romedy Now; MN+ MNX; Mirror Now

History
- Launched: 2009; 17 years ago

Links
- Website: etnownews.com

ET Now is an English-language business and finance news channel in India, owned and operated by The Times Group, and affiliated with The Economic Times. It covers politics, governance, environment, and technology. It is headquartered in Mumbai.

== Editors and anchors ==
=== Supriya Shrinate ===
In 2008, Supriya Shrinate joined ET Now as chief editor – news. She was named policy editor and executive editor for ET Now the same year. In 2019, she resigned from her post of executive editor in ET Now to contest 2019 Indian general election.
