= The Times Group =

Mass media conglomerate in India

Bennett, Coleman & Co. Ltd.
- Logo of The Times Group
- Type: Private
- Industry: Mass media
- Founded: 4 November 1838 (187 years ago)
- Headquarters: Mumbai, Maharashtra, India
- Key people: Samir Jain (Vice-Chairman and Managing Director); Vineet Jain (Managing Director); Sivakumar Sundaram (Chairman, Executive Committee)
- Products: Publishing; broadcasting; radio; films; entertainment; web portals
- Revenue: ▲₹73.94 billion (US$770 million) (2022)
- Net income: ▲₹4.57 billion (US$47 million) (2022)
- Owner: Sahu Jain family
- Number of employees: 11,100 (2014)
- Subsidiaries: Times Internet; Bennett University; Times Music; Junglee Pictures; Times Innovative Media Limited; Times Business Solutions Limited; Times Guaranty Ltd; Times Publishing House Limited
- Website: bccl.in

Bennett, Coleman and Co. Ltd. (BCCL), d/b/a The Times Group, is an Indian media conglomerate based in Mumbai. Notable media properties owned and operated by the group include India's largest selling daily English-language newspaper The Times of India, television channels such as Times Now, the radio station network Radio Mirchi, and magazines Filmfare and Femina.

The Sahu Jain family owns a majority of the stake in the group. In May 2023, the Times Group was split into two separate business entities between brothers Vineet Jain and Samir Jain, such that its radio and broadcast properties would remain with Vineet Jain and its print properties would be under the ownership of Samir Jain.

== History ==
The Bombay Times and Journal of Commerce was first published on 3 November 1838 as a predecessor to what would become The Times of India. While starting as a biweekly paper, it was converted to a daily in 1850. In 1859 the paper was merged with two other papers into the Bombay Times and Standard under editor Robert Knight. Two years later, in 1861, the paper got a more national scope with the title The Times of India. Subsequently the paper saw its ownership change several times until 1892 when an English journalist named Thomas Jewell Bennett along with Frank Morris Coleman (who later drowned in the 1915 sinking of the SS Persia) acquired the newspaper through their new joint stock company, Bennett, Coleman & Co. Ltd. (BCCL). At the time, some 800 people were employed by the paper.

The company, by that time consolidated in the Times of India Group, was taken over from its British owners in 1946 by industrialist Ramkrishna Dalmia.

Dalmia (7 April 1893 – 26 September 1978) was a pioneer industrialist and founder of the Dalmia-Jain group or Dalmia Group and the Times Group. The name is variously written as Ram Krishan Dalmia and Ram Kishan Dalmia. In 1947, Dalmia engineered the acquisition of the media giant Bennett, Coleman by transferring monies from a bank and an insurance company of which he was the chairman. In 1955, this came to the attention of the socialist parliamentarian Feroze Gandhi who was part of the ruling Congress party headed by his estranged father-in-law Jawaharlal Nehru. In December 1955, he raised the matter in the Parliament, documenting extensively the various fund transfers and intermediaries through which the acquisition had been financed. The case was investigated by the Vivian Bose Commission of Inquiry.

In the court case that followed, where he was represented by the leading British attorney Sir Dingle Mackintosh Foot, Dalmia was sentenced to two years in Tihar Jail. But he managed to spend most of the jail term in hospital. During this period the company was run by Dalmia's son-in-law Sahu Shanti Prasad Jain.

Upon his release his son-in-law Sahu Shanti Prasad Jain to whom he had entrusted running of Bennett, Coleman & Co. Ltd. rebuffed his efforts to resume command of the company. Jain would buy the company a few years later and the company would be primarily run by his family in the years after. The company expanded its presence in the Indian media sphere by founding different papers and local editions of The Times of India.

== Decline and revival ==
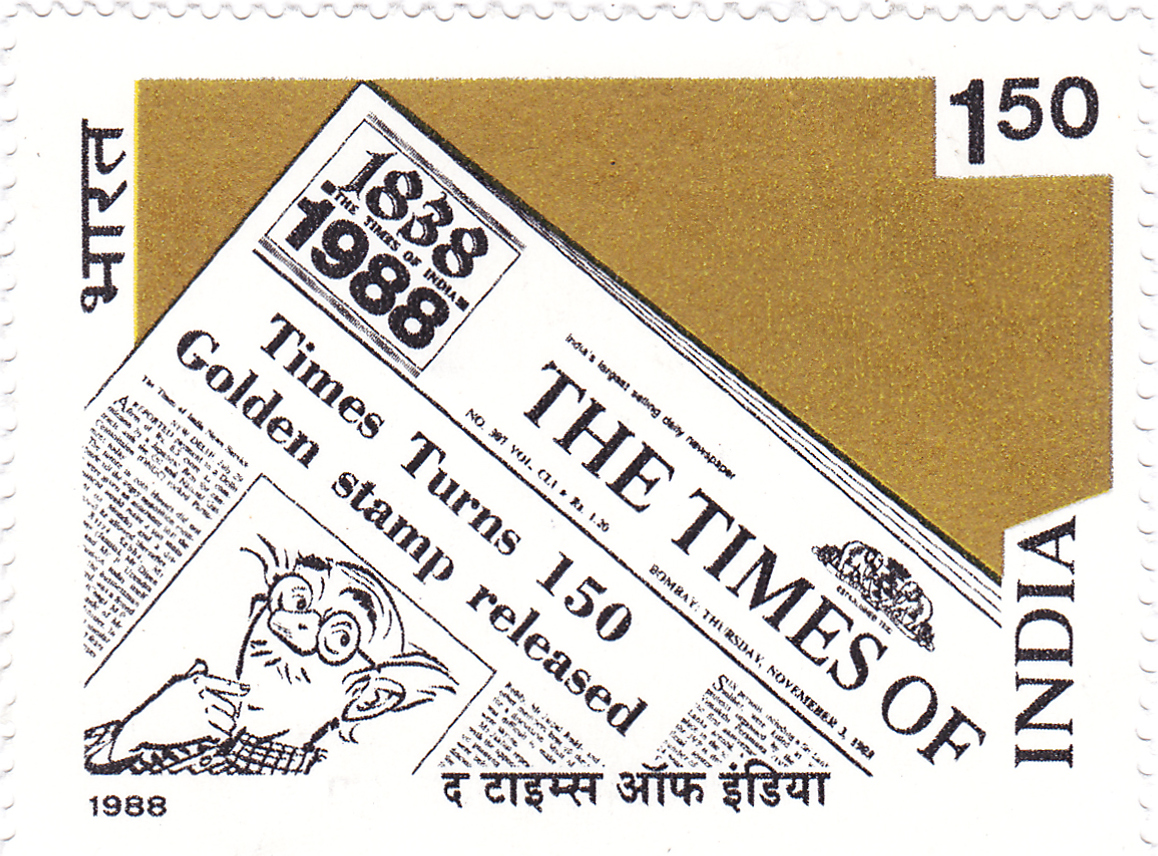
The Times of India 1988 stamp of India

The Times of India press published a number of influential English (e.g. Illustrated Weekly of India 1880-1993) and Hindi magazines (e.g. Dharmyug 1949-1997, Sarika, Dinaman 1965-1990s, Parag 1958-1990s), edited by distinguished authors including Khushwant Singh, Dharmveer Bharti, Agyeya and Sarveshwar Dayal Saxena. However, the organisation faced financial difficulties, and most of them were closed down during the 1990s.

The sons of Sahu Ashok Jain, Sahu Samir Jain and Vineet Jain are credited with reviving the financial success of the group with newer and more profitable ventures.

== Assets ==
=== Publications ===
- The Times of India, largest circulation of any English-language newspaper in the world, with 2.8 million copies.
- The Economic Times
- Navbharat Times
- Maharashtra Times
- Mumbai Mirror
- Vijaya Karnataka
- Bangalore Mirror
- Pune Mirror
- Bombay Times

=== Television channels ===
The Times Group owns the following channels.

Channel	Language	Category	SD/HD availability	Notes
MNX	English	Movies	SD+HD	Formerly Movies Now 2
Movies Now	English	Movies	SD+HD	
Romedy Now	English	Movies	SD	
MN+	English	Movies	HD	
Times Now World	English	News	HD	Formerly Times Now HD
Times Now	English	News	SD	
ET Now	English	Business News	SD	
ET Now Swadesh	Hindi	Business News	SD	
Zoom	Hindi	Music	SD	
Times Now Navbharat	Hindi	News	SD+HD	

=== Defunct channels ===
Channel	Launch	Language	Category	Defunct	SD/HD availability	Notes
1Sports		English	Sports	2023	SD	
Mirror Now		English	News	2025	SD	

=== Times Business Solutions Limited ===
TBS
- Type: Business Service
- Founded: 2004
- Net income: 180,000,000 Canadian dollar (2016)
- Number of employees: 11,002 (2014)
- Parent: Times Internet
- Website: http://www.tbsl.in/

Times Business Solutions – A division of Times Internet Limited is a limited company, wholly owned by Bennett Coleman Company Limited (The Times Group). TBS develops web sites within areas such as recruitment, real estate and matrimonials such as SimplyMarry.com.

TBS started as a division of BCCL in 2004 to create an exchange for job seekers and employers on the internet. With the growth of internet attaining rapid speed and being a highly profitable venture, Times Business Solutions – A division of Times Internet Limited was born as the "Internet Initiatives" of BCCL. Times Group, others put $20 million into Square Yards in September 2019.

=== Times Internet ===
Times Internet is an Indian company which owns, operates and invests in various Internet-led products, services and technology.

=== Radio Mirchi ===
Radio Mirchi is a nationwide network of private FM radio stations in India.

== See also ==
- Publications of The Times Group
