= Media conglomerate =

Large company involved in mass media industry

A media conglomerate, media company, media group, or media institution is a company that owns numerous companies involved in mass media enterprises, such as music, television, radio, publishing, motion pictures, video games, amusement parks, or the Internet. Despite ownership over several companies and diverse mediums, by definition, media conglomerates only maintain holdings over media and not other enterprises.

Some media conglomerates use their access in multiple areas to share various kinds of content such as: news, video and music, between users. The media sector's tendency to consolidate has caused formerly diversified companies to appear less diverse to prospective investors in comparison with similar companies that are traded publicly and privately. Therefore, the term media group may also be applied, however, it has not yet replaced the more traditional term.

== History ==
While cross-industry corporate conglomeration began to dominate the market in the mid-twentieth century, with the success of companies like Ling-Temco-Vought, some media companies first began integration in the 1920s. In 1924, The Chicago Tribune bought the WDAP radio station and changed its name to WGN (AM), marking an early example of vertical integration to form a conglomeration. In 1948, the Tribune began WGN-TV, a broadcasting affiliate that operated out of the newspaper's headquarters, further integrating the conglomerate into numerous enterprises within the media industry.

Following the first instances of media conglomeration, the federal government under President Franklin D. Roosevelt established the Federal Communications Commission (FCC) in 1934. The FCC, created under the Communications Act of 1934, consolidated transferred ownership of radio and public broadcasting to the federal government. Included in this new regulatory structure were broadcast licensing requirements that the FCC charged fees to obtain, leading to the shuttering of some smaller radio stations and the start of the dominance of a few large radio companies. This consolidation caused concern, and lead to the development of the Local Radio Ownership Rule, which puts a cap on the number of stations that a single company can own within a specific market. In 1941, the FCC adopted a similar rule to curb conglomeration within the growing television market, banning TV duolopies and preventing one company from owning two stations that serve the same market.

Media conglomerates, like other conglomerates, are typically formed through the process of mergers and acquisitions, which allow for a company to absorb another entity either by taking control of its assets or consolidating the two. The conglomerate boom of the 1960s jumpstarted the trend, low interest rates on loans made leveraged buyouts relatively easy for large companies. Since interest rates were so low, parent companies could easily absorb subsidiaries as long as profits from the new entity were greater than the loan interest rates for the acquisition.

Widespread global commercialization within the media industry did not begin until the 1980s. Deregulation efforts from the U.S. government and rapid developments in communication encouraged mass media companies to take their domestic enterprises internationally. The subsequent development of conglomerates in international markets has been steady and faster than domestic markets. For example, in 2024, Walt Disney Studios, one of the largest conglomerates in the world, grew its revenue by 9.31% in Asia and 7.83% in Europe, while it grew by just over 1% in the United States.

== Criticism ==
Critics have accused the large media conglomerates of dominating the media and using unfair practices. During a protest in November 2007, critics such as Jesse Jackson spoke out against consolidation of the media. This can be seen in the news industry, where corporations refuse to publicize information that would be harmful to their interests. Because some corporations do not publish any material that criticizes them or their interests, media conglomerates have been criticized for limiting free speech or not protecting free speech. These practices are also suspected of contributing to the merging of entertainment and news (sensationalism) at the expense of the coverage of serious issues. They are also accused of being a leading force behind the standardization of culture (see globalization, Americanization) and are frequently criticized by groups that perceive news organizations as being biased toward special interests of the owners.

Because there are fewer independent media, there is less diversity in news and entertainment and therefore less competition. This can result in the reduction of different points of view as well as vocalization about different issues. There is also a lack of ethnic and gender diversity as a majority of those in media are white, middle-class men. There is a concern that their views are being shared disproportionately more than other groups, such as women and ethnic minorities. Women and minorities also have less ownership of media. Women have less than 7 percent of TV and radio licenses, and minorities have around 7 percent of radio licenses and 3 percent of TV licenses.

== Examples by country ==
According to the 2026 Forbes Global 2000 list, Comcast is the world's largest media conglomerate in terms of revenue, with The Walt Disney Company, Skydance, & Fox Corporation completing the top four.

In 1984, fifty independent media companies owned the majority of media interests within the United States. By 2011, 90% of the United States's media was controlled by six media conglomerates: GE/Comcast (NBC, Universal), News Corp (Fox News, Wall Street Journal, New York Post), Disney (ABC, ESPN, Pixar), Viacom (MTV, BET, Paramount Pictures), Time Warner (CNN, HBO, Warner Bros.), and CBS (Showtime, NFL.com).

In 1941, the Federal Communications Commission enacted a duopoly policy, preventing the ownership of two or more stations by the same parent company within specific boundaries. The current form of this policy prohibits mergers between the four largest companies in the broadcast television industry. Up until 1975, several laws that restricted channel ownership within radio and television were enacted in order to maintain unbiased and diverse media. However under the Reagan administration, Congress and the Federal Communications Commission, then led by FCC Chairman Mark S. Fowler, began a concerted deregulation over the years 1981 and 1985, increasing the number of television stations a single entity can own increased from seven to 12. In a 1987 article, The New York Times claimed that Fowler transformed "broadcasting licenses, once rigorously monitored by the F.C.C." to "commodities traded on the open market." Now, there is no upper limit imposed on the FCC regarding a single entity's ownership of multiple stations, as long as the net audience reach of the conglomerate is not greater than 39% of U.S. households. However, by mid-2026 (around August), it was reported that, in voting 2-1 to eliminate a cap on the share of US television households a single company can reach, the FCC is claiming to have repealed the 22-year old rule holding that a company cannot own stations that reach more than a combined 39% of the US television audience; however, legal experts have pointed out that the federal government agency has no such authority to overturn the 39% cap on TV station ownership, as that cap was put in place through Congressional action. It is also being reported that the FCC is claiming to replace the ownership cap with a "case-by-case approach".

The industry continued to deregulate with enactment of the Telecommunications Act of 1996. Signed by President Bill Clinton on 8 February 1996, it was considered by the FCC to be the "first major overhaul of telecommunications law in almost 62 years". In the radio industry, the 40-station ownership cap was lifted, leading to an unprecedented amount of consolidation. Since this period, IHeartMedia grew from 40 stations to 870 stations worldwide, while Viacom grew to owning 180 stations across 41 markets after a merger with CBS in May 2000.

As media consolidation grew, some in the nation began to speculate how it might negatively impact society at large. In the case of Minot, North Dakota, the concerns regarding media consolidation is realized. On 18 January 2002, a train containing hazardous chemicals derailed in the middle of the night, exposing countless Minot residents to toxic waste. Upon trying to get out an emergency broadcast, the Minot police were unable to reach anyone. They were instead forwarded to the same automated message, as all the broadcast stations in Minot were single-handedly owned by IHeartMedia.

Canada, Australia, the Philippines, and New Zealand also experience the concentration of multiple media enterprises in a few companies. This concentration is an ongoing concern for the Canadian Radio-television and Telecommunications Commission, the Australian Communications and Media Authority, the Philippine National Telecommunications Commission, and New Zealand's Broadcasting Standards Authority. Other countries that have large media conglomerates with impacts on the world include: Japan, Germany, the United Kingdom, Italy, France, China, Mexico, Egypt, Brazil, and Philippines. Media conglomerates outside of the United States include Fujisankei Communications Group (Fuji Television), Yomiuri Shimbun Holdings, Hubert Burda Media, ITV, ProSiebenSat.1, Mediaset, Axel Springer, JCDecaux, China Central Television, Alibaba Group, GMA Network, Solar Entertainment Corporation, Nine Media Corporation, Lopez Holdings Corporation and PLDT (which includes RPN, ABS-CBN Corporation, MediaQuest Holdings, Cignal Entertainment and TV5 Network, respectively), Aliw Broadcasting Corporation, Radio Mindanao Network, Advanced Media Broadcasting System, People's Television Network, Radio Philippines Network, Intercontinental Broadcasting Corporation, Presidential Broadcast Service, Viva Communications, Prasar Bharati, The Asahi Shimbun, Grupo Televisa, TV Azteca, Grupo Imagen, Grupo Globo, Baidu, GMM Grammy and Bertelsmann.

=== United States ===
	Comcast	The Walt Disney Company	Skydance	Fox Corporation	Access Industries	Amazon.com	Versant
Movie production	Universal Pictures	Walt Disney Pictures, 20th Century Studios	Warner Bros. Pictures, Paramount Pictures, New Line Cinema	MarVista	AI Film (UK), RatPac-Dune Entertainment (controlling stake), Access Entertainment (US)	Amazon MGM Studios, Metro-Goldwyn-Mayer	
TV production	Universal Studio Group, Sky Studios, DWA Television	Disney TV Studios, It's a Laugh Productions, Disney TV Animation, FX Productions, Freeform Studios	Nickelodeon Animation Studio, CBS Studios, Paramount Television Studios, WB TV Studios, WB Animation, WBITVP, Cartoon Network Studios, Discovery Studios	Fox Entertainment Studios, Bento Box Entertainment, Studio Ramsay Global	Amedia (majority stake) (RU)	MGM Television, Amazon MGM Studios	
Broadcast TV network	NBC, Cozi TV, Sky, Telemundo, TeleXitos	ABC, Localish (US); RTL Zwei (15.75% DE), NOW (TR)	CBS, Channel 5 (UK), Network 10 (AU)	Fox, MyNetworkTV, Movies! (50%)	RGE Group (33%) (IL)	Living (NZ)	
Cable channels	Sky	Disney Channels, Disney India Media Networks, A+E Global Media (50%), Freeform, FX Networks, NatGeo Net (73%)	Paramount Media Networks, Paramount International Networks, BET Media Group, TBS, TNT, TruTV, The Cartoon Network, Inc. (Cartoon Network, Adult Swim), HBO, Discovery Channel, Animal Planet, Food Network, HGTV, TLC, Discovery Family (60%), Warner Bros. Discovery International		RGE Group (33%) (IL)	MGM+	USA Network, Syfy, E!
News, business channels/ operations	NBCUniversal News Group, Sky News	ABC News, ABC News Radio	CBS News, CBS News 24/7, CNN, HLN	Fox News, Fox Business			MS NOW, CNBC
National sports networks/ operations	NBC Sports Group, Sky Sports, NHL Network (15.6%)	ESPN (80%)	CBS Sports, TNT Sports, MLB Network (16%), Eurosport (Europe), DSport (India), Play Sports Group (71%, U.K.)	Fox Sports	Sports Channel (IL)		USA Sports
Audio industry	Back Lot Music	ABC Audio, Disney Music Group, Marvel New Media	Paramount Music, WaterTower Music, Williams Street Records		Warner Music Group		
Publishing		Marvel Comics, National Geographic (73%), Disney Publishing Worldwide	DC Comics, MAD Magazine, Golf Digest, Golf World	TMZ	Amazon Publishing, Kindle Direct Publishing		
OTT	Peacock, Now, Sky Go, Xumo	Disney+ (Star; Hotstar, Star+), Hulu, ESPN, Marvel Unlimited (Comics)	Paramount+, Pluto TV, BET+, HBO Max, DC Universe Infinite (Comics), Discovery+ Fandango (25%)	Fox Nation, Fox One, Tubi	DAZN (85%)	Amazon Prime Video, Amazon Music, Twitch (Gaming)	Fandango (75%)
Internet			Fandango Media (25%)	Deezer	LiveNow from Fox	Box Office Mojo, IMDb	Fandango Media (75%)
Telecommunications	Xfinity, Sky Broadband						
Video games	Universal Brand Development	Disney Games and Interactive Experiences, Epic Games (9%)	Paramount Games Studio, Warner Bros. Games			Amazon Games, Amazon Digital Game Store	
Total Revenues	US$12.736 billion (2025)	US$94.425 billion (FY25)	US$28.9 billion (2025)	$48.5 billion (est., FY2025)	US$17 Billion	US$10 billion (2024)	US$16.3 billion (2025)

=== International ===
	Sony (Japan)	Bertelsmann (Germany)	Vivendi (France)	Liberty Global (UK/US/NL)	Turkuvaz Media Group (TR/EU/US)	Essel Group (India)	CT Corp (Indonesia)	Egmont Group (Denmark)	Televisa (Mexico)	Grupo Globo (Brazil)	TV Azteca (Mexico)	Grupo Imagen (Mexico)	GMA Network Inc. (Philippines)	Lopez Holdings Corporation (Philippines)	PLDT (Philippines)	The Times Group (India)	Viva Communications (Philippines)	GMM Grammy (Thailand)	Media Prima (Malaysia)	MBC Media Group (Philippines)	CJ Group (South Korea)
Movie production	Sony Pictures Motion Picture Group	UFA		Lionsgate Films (US, 3.5%)	Sinehane (TR)	Zee Studios	Transinema Pictures	Nordisk Film	Videocine	Globo Filmes	Azteca Cinema		GMA Pictures	ABS-CBN Corporation	MediaQuest Holdings, TV5 Network	Mirchi Movies Limited, Junglee Pictures Limited	Viva Films	GDH 559	Primeworks Studios		CJ Entertainment, CJ ENM Studios
TV production	Sony Pictures Television (US)	Fremantle (UK)		Lionsgate Television (US, 3.5%)	ATV (Turkish TV channel)	Essel Vision Productions		Nordisk Film Production (formerly)		Estúdios Globo	Azteca Estudios		GMA Entertainment Group	ABS-CBN Corporation	MediaQuest Holdings, TV5 Network	Metropolitan Media Company Limited	Viva Television	GMMTV, GMM Bravo	Primeworks Studios	MBC TV	CJ ENM, Studio Dragon (Culture Depot, GT:st, Gill Pictures, Hwa&Dam Pictures, KPJ Corporation), JS Pictures, Fifth Season (US, 55%)
Broadcast TV network	Get (US)	Buzzr (US); RTL Group (LU)		Telenet (BE, 58%), Ziggo (NL, 50%), ITV plc (UK, minority), Virgin Media Television (IRL)	Zee Media Corporation, Zee Entertainment Enterprises		Trans TV, Trans7		Las Estrellas, Canal 5, Canal 9, FOROtv	Rede Globo	Azteca 7, Azteca Uno, ADN 40, A Más	Excélsior TV, Imagen Televisión	GMA, GTV, Heart of Asia Channel, I Heart Movies, Hallypop (under Jungo TV), Pinoy Hits	ABS-CBN (content provider), A2Z (blocktime with ZOE Broadcasting Network), TV5 (entertainment production partner), Knowledge Channel, PIE (co-owned with BEAM TV), GMA (entertainment production partner), All TV (entertainment production partner)	TV5, RPTV (50%)	Times Global Broadcasting and Zoom Entertainment Network	TV5 (entertainment production partner)	GMM 25, One 31	TV3, 8TV, TV9, NTV7		
Cable channels	Sony Pictures Television Networks	Buzzr (US); RTL Group (LU)		Telenet (BE, 58%), Ziggo (NL, 50%), ITV plc (UK, minority), Virgin Media Television (IRL)	Zee Media Corporation, Zee Entertainment Enterprises			TV 2 Direkte, TV 2 Zebra, TV 2 Livsstil (NO)	Televisa Networks	Canais Globo, Globo Internacional	Azteca Internacional		GMA Pinoy TV, GMA Life TV, GMA News TV	Kapamilya Channel, Cine Mo!, Creative Programs, ABS-CBN Global Ltd.	PBA Rush, Sari-Sari Channel (50%), Pilipinas Global Network Ltd.	Times Music, Movies Now, Romedy Now	PBO, Viva Cinema, Sari-Sari Channel (50%), TMC: Tagalized Movie Channel, History, Crime & Investigation Network, Lifetime, Celestial Movies Pinoy	GMM Z		DZRHTV	Mnet, tvN, tvN Drama (formerly OtvN), tvN Show (formerly XTM and XtvN), tvN Story (formerly OnStyle), tvN Movies, OCN, CATCHON, Chunghwa TV, Tooniverse, DIA TV, UXN
News, business channels/ operations					Zee News		CNN Indonesia (franchise), CNBC Indonesia (franchise)	TV 2 Nyheter (NO)		Noticieros Televisa	GloboNews	Azteca Noticias	GMA Integrated News, GMA Public Affairs	ABS-CBN News and Current Affairs, ABS-CBN News Channel, TeleRadyo Serbisyo (co-owned with Prime Media Holdings)	News5, One News, One PH	ET Now, Lead India, Mirror Now, Times Now		DZRH News Television			
National sports networks/ operations		Sports Channel (IL)		Ziggo Sport (NL, 50%)			Golf Channel Indonesia (JV), Golf+	TV 2 Sport, TV 2 Sport Premium (NO)	Televisa Deportes, TUDN	SporTV	Azteca Deportes		GMA Sports		One Sports, One Sports (TV channel), One Sports+					tvN Sports	
Audio industry	Sony Music Group (US), EMI Music Publishing (UK), Sony Music Entertainment Japan (Japan)	BMG			Zee Music Company		Trans Talent Management			Som Livre (former)		Imagen Radio	GMA Music (GMA Playlist, AltG Records), Super Radyo, Barangay FM	MOR Entertainment, MyxRadio, Star Music, One Music PH, DWPM (co-owned with Prime Media Holdings)	Radyo5	Viva Records, Halo-Halo Radio, Vicor Music, Ivory Music and Video	Zoom, Radio Mirchi	Chill FM Online, EFM 94, Green Wave 106.5 FM, Hot 91.5	Hot FM, Fly FM, 8FM, Kool FM	DZRH, Love Radio, Easy Rock Network, Yes FM, Aksyon Radyo, Radyo Natin	Stone Music Entertainment, Wake One Entertainment, AOMG
Publishing		Gruner + Jahr, Penguin Random House (US, UK 53%), Bertelsmann Printing Group						Egmont Publishing	Editorial Televisa, Intermex	Editora Globo		Excélsior	ABS-CBN Publishing	The Philippine Star (51%), BusinessWorld (70%)	Viva Books Publishing Inc.		The Times of India, The Economic Times, Navbharat Times, The Illustrated Weekly of India		Berita Harian, Harian Metro, New Straits Times under New Straits Times Press	Image, Madame Figaro Magazine, In Magazine	
OTT	Crunchyroll	Videoland (Netherlands), RTL+ (Germany & Hungary)			ZEE5			Nordisk Film +, TV 2 Play (NO)	VIX	Globoplay			GMA On Demand	iWantTFC	Cignal Play	Vivamax	Gaana, MX Player		Tonton		TVING (48.85%)
Internet					playwin		detik Network	TV2.no	Comercio Más, Televisa Digital, Televisa Interactive Media	Globo.com	Azteca Internet	Imagen Digital	GMA New Media, GMANetwork.com, Kapuso Stream, GMA News Online	ABS-CBN Digital Media, Kapamilya Online Live, ABS-CBNnews.com			BoxTV.com, CricBuzz, TimesJobs, SimplyMarry, MagicBricks, ZigWheels		REV Media (SAYS, SAYS SEISMIK, OhBulan, Vocket, Sirap Limau, Juice)	MBC Digital	CJ ENM Digital
Telecommunications	So-net			UPC Broadband (Europe), Virgin Media (UK), Telenet (Belgium) (58%), Vodafone Netherlands (50%)			Izzi Telecom and Sky Mexico							ABS-CBN Convergence (68%), Sky Cable Corporation (59.4%), Adtel, Inc.	PLDT, Smart, TNT, Cignal TV						
Video games	Sony Interactive Entertainment, Unties		Gameloft					Nordisk Film Interactive, Nordisk Games					GMA New Media	ABS-CBN Digital Media				MBC Digital			
2023 Revenues	Sony Entertainment: US$15.1 billion	US$20.30 billion	€16.02 billion	US$12 billion	US$110 million	Trans Corp: US$207.6 million	US$4.81 billion	€2,073 million (2021)	US$4.4 billion	US$390 million		US$760 million	₱6.61 billion (2026)	Lopez Holdings: ₱107.28 billion (2020); ABS-CBN: ₱15.852 billion (2025)	PLDT: ₱210.95 billion (2023); MediaQuest Holdings: ₱12.2 billion (2022); TV5 Network: ₱1.977 billion (2022)	US$391 million	US$204.44 million	US$19.6 million		US$2.31 million	

== See also ==
- Media imperialism
- Media proprietor
- State media
- Multinational corporation
- Lists of corporate assets
- Dispersal of ownership
