= ET Money =

Fintech and wealth management platform

- Formerly: Smartspends
- Industry: FinTech
- Founded: 2015; 11 years ago
- Founder: Mukesh Kalra
- Headquarters: Gurgaon, Haryana, India
- Area served: India
- Key people: Mukesh Kalra (CEO); Santosh Navlani (COO)
- Products: Insurance, SIP, Mutual funds, Loans, Cards, Fixed deposit, National Pension Scheme
- AUM: $3 billion (₹28,000 crores)
- Parent: 360 One WAM
- Website: etmoney.com

ET Money is an Indian fintech and wealth management platform which was founded in 2015 . It offers a variety of financial products and services, including mutual funds, insurance, fixed deposits, NPS and SIPs. The investments tracked and managed on the app is US$3 billion (₹22,500 crore) as of March 2022.

In June 2024, was acquired by 360 One Wealth and Asset Management for 366 crores ($44 Million).

== History ==
ET Money was founded in 2015 by Mukesh Kalra, who earlier founded the fintech company Moneysights in 2009, which was later acquired by Times Internet in October 2014. Moneysights was backed by ex-HP and IBM executive Prasad Duvvuri, Blume Ventures and Naveen Tewari of InMobi.

The app was launched as Smartspends and later, it was rebranded to ET Money in October 2016. The ET Money secured 2.5 million app downloads in 2017. It processed over 2 crore investment orders and registered a ₹500 crore sales in the mutual fund within two years of its launch. It had more than 4 million users on its app, as reported in 2018. It currently has more than 5 million app downloads on the Google Play store as of April 2022. Initially, it was conceived as a platform to help users maintain their daily and monthly spending. Later it added mutual funds and insurance products to its features. It tied up with various financial services companies and banks, including Reliance Mutual Fund, Bajaj Finance, HDFC Life and RBL Bank to offer multiple products and services.

In April 2021, it launched an Aadhaar-based SIP (Systematic Investment Plan) payments feature, which can be used to start a SIP online and set up automatic payments using an Aadhaar-based OTP verification.

In October 2021, the company crossed the sale of ₹500 crore of mutual funds in a month and investments managed through ET Money exceeded ₹20,000 crore. In March 2022, it registered a $3 billion (₹22,500 crores) of total mutual fund investments being managed on the platform. The investments completed through the app has increased from ₹832 crore in March 2019 to over ₹7,500 crore in Oct 2021, a 901% growth. The company launched ET Money Genius, a premium membership service to offer personalised investing knowledge to its users, in January 2022.

360 ONE WAM, a wealth manager for ultra-high-net-worth individuals, announced to the stock exchanges on June 12 that it has entered into a definitive agreement to acquire ET MONEY, a digital platform focused on wealth management for 366 crores.

== Features ==
The app offers to purchase and sell direct mutual funds at zero commission charge. The app allows users to buy various financial products and services such as mutual funds, insurance, fixed deposits, instant loans, NPS (National Pension Scheme) and SIPs. It has a feature called SmartDeposit, which is powered by Reliance Mutual Fund and it allows users to earn higher interest rate on saving account balance.

The app creates a category-wise record of spending incurred by a user by connecting to the user's SMS records and fetching data on electronic transactions. It creates the user's financial and risk profile based on the data obtained from the transaction records captured in text message alerts. It also allows users to buy life and term insurance plans, motor vehicle insurance, health insurance, gold, and mutual funds. It also lets its users check their credit scores on its platform for free.

== Reception ==
Reviewing the app, Deepti Ratnam of BGR.in writes, ‘Packed with deep insights and fundamentals to advanced concepts of fund investing, this app helps investors develop strategies to meet their financial goals.’ It was awarded the 2019 Mobexx Awards under best mobile app for financial services category in 2019. The app was featured by Google as a top personal finance app in 2016.

== See also ==
- Kuvera.in
- Mutual funds in India
- Times Internet
