= Housing in India =

Housing in India varies from palaces of erstwhile maharajas, to modern apartment buildings in big cities, to tiny huts in far-flung villages. The Human Rights Measurement Initiative finds that India is doing 60.9% of what should be possible at its level of income for the right to housing. As of 2025, the Indian real estate market is valued at approximately USD 400 billion, with residential real estate comprising the dominant segment. The market is projected to grow to over USD 1 trillion by 2030, with a compound annual growth rate (CAGR) ranging between 9% and 16%, depending on the source.

== Low income housing ==
According to the Times of India, "a majority of Indians have per capita space equivalent to or less than a 10 feet x 10 feet room for their living, sleeping, cooking, washing and toilet needs." The average housing area is 103 sq ft per person in rural areas and 117 sq ft per person in urban areas. 99 percent of rural households have access to electricity. Although cities have better facilities than villages in the country, it is made sure that there is provision of a full-day water supply. Almost all States such as Gujarat, Madhya Pradesh, Maharashtra, West Bengal, Tamil Nadu and others provides a continuous power supply.

== Cities ==
=== Mumbai ===
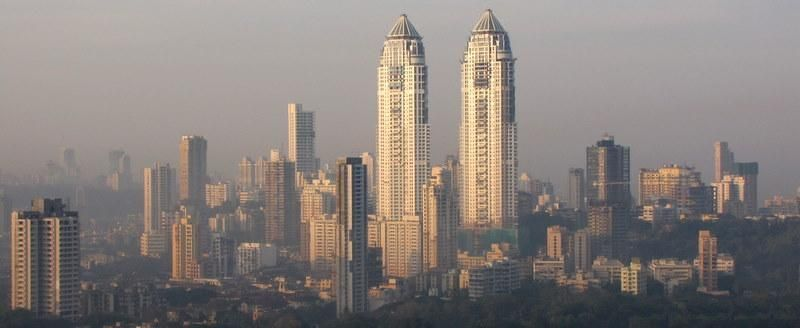
The Imperial Towers, Mumbai are the 2nd tallest buildings in India.

Mumbai experiences similar urbanisation challenges as other fast growing cities in developing countries. There is a wide disparity in housing between the affluent, middle-income and low-income segments of the population.

Highly desirable neighborhoods such as Colaba, Malabar Hill, Marine Drive, Bandra and Juhu house professionals, industrialists, Bollywood movie stars and expatriates. Up-scale flats have 3 or more bedrooms, ocean views, tasteful interior decoration, parking for luxury cars and sleeping quarters for maids and cooks. In 2007, Mumbai condominiums were the priciest in the developing world at around US$9,000 to US$10,200 per square metre. Mumbai has more than 1,500 high rise buildings, many of which are still in the planning stage, but some already constructed or under construction.

Despite the recent economic growth, there is poverty and unemployment that exists as reflected by poor housing conditions for some sections of the population. With available space at a premium, working-class Mumbai residents often reside in cramped and basic quality, yet relatively expensive housing, usually far from workplaces. Despite this, Mumbai's economic boom continues to attract migrants in search of opportunities from across the country. The number of migrants to Mumbai from outside Maharashtra during the 1991–2001 decade was 1.12 million, which amounted to 54.8% of the net addition to the population of Mumbai.

Over 7 million people, over 42% of the population of Mumbai, live in informal housing or slums, yet they cover only 6–8% of the city's land area. Slums were recognized as a problem as early as in 1919 by the Bombay Municipal Corporation. Slum growth rate in Mumbai is greater than the general urban growth rate. Financial Times writes that "Dharavi is the grand panjandrum of the Mumbai slums". Dharavi, Asia's second-largest slum is located in central Mumbai and houses over 1 million people. Slums are a growing tourist attraction in Mumbai.

Most of the remaining live in chawls and on footpaths. Chawls are a quintessentially Mumbai phenomenon of multi-storied terrible quality tenements, typically a bit higher quality than slums. 80 per cent of chawls have only one room. Pavement dwellers refers to Mumbai dwellings built on the footpaths/pavements of city streets. Rent control laws have helped to create a housing shortage. Most of the investors are looking to invest in ongoing real estate projects to get maximum returns. The MMRDA has released the Mumbai Development Plan for 2034 which discusses means of creating affordable housing, including a criticised proposal to build on salt pan land.

== Corruption ==
There is a large developed housing market with major builders and promoters. Some municipal and other government officials, elected politicians, real estate developers and a few law enforcement officials, acquire, develop and sell land in illegal ways. Sometimes, government land or land ostensibly acquired for some legitimate government purpose is then handed over to real estate developers who build commercial and residential properties and sell them in the open market, with the connivance of a small section of the administrative and police officials. In one set of allegations in Karnataka, a lake was filled in and government buildings torn down after illegal transfers to a developer by mafia-connected officials. Eminent domain laws, intended to procure private land at relatively low prices for public benefit or redistribution to poorer people under social justice programs, are abused to pressure existing landholders to sell land to a government entity, which transfers the land to developers at those low prices, and who in turn sell it back on the market at much higher prices. The computerization of records relating to the classification of tracts and land ownership is a key tool in countering the illegal activities of land mafias, since it creates transparency on all information relating to a given parcel of land. This approach has been effective in Bangalore, but efforts to extend it elsewhere have sometimes met with strong resistance by land mafias, manifesting itself as bureaucratic inaction.

== Indian property bubble ==
The Indian property bubble refers to the concern expressed by some Indian economists that housing market in some major Indian cities may be in a bubble. The real estate sector is thought to be collapsing due to increasing costs of financing. Real estate projects in India take a long time to complete due to a complicated and corrupt regulatory mechanism. Several of the India's publicly traded real estate firms are in debt. The inventory of unsold real estate assets is growing and it is expected the market will undergo price corrections. According to Mumbai-based market research agency, Liases Foras, 30% of the transaction in the real estate sector is done with black money. In September 2019, India announced that it will provide $1.41 billion of funds to boost affordable and middle income housing, as part of measures designed to aid India’s slowing economy.

== Finance ==
There are a variety of financial institutions providing home lending services to prospective buyers. The process is similar for consumers in India as it is in other countries with a mature housing finance industry.

Consumers need to prove the ability to repay and qualify based on a full picture of finances including proof of income and expenses. The largest lender in the country is Housing Development Finance Corporation.

Lenders require an Encumbrance Certificate for the prospective property, which verifies a clear title. Some lenders require the property to be RERA certified.

== Technology and online property listings ==
Technology is used by consumers, property owners and property managers to advertise and search for real estate. Online platforms such as OLX, Magicbricks, Makaan.com, Quikr and 99acres provide listings of properties available for sale or rent.

== Indian real estate developers ==
Notable real estate developers operating in India include Lodha Group, Bhutani Group, DLF, Godrej Properties, Prestige Estates Projects, Sobha, Brigade Group, Oberoi Realty, Mahindra Lifespaces, Puravankara, Embassy Group, Shapoorji Pallonji Real Estate, Kolte-Patil Developers, Casagrand, M3M, ATS Infrastructure, Experion Developers, and Janjaes Infra. These companies are involved in the development of residential, commercial, and mixed-use real estate projects in different parts of India.

== See also ==
- Architecture of India
- Housing for All
- Indian states ranking by families owning house
- Illegal housing in India
- Ministry of Housing and Urban Poverty Alleviation
- Housing Development Finance Corporation
- RERA
- Digital India Land Record Modernization Programme
- Real-estate bubble
- Housing bubble
- 2000s United States housing bubble
- Chinese property bubble (2005–2011)
