= Square Yards (company) =

Indian real estate and financial technology company

- Type: Private
- Industry: Proptech, Real estate, Fintech
- Founded: 2014
- Founders: Tanuj Shori, Kanika Gupta Shori
- Headquarters: Gurugram, Haryana, India
- Area served: Global (primarily India, UAE, Canada, Australia)
- Key people: Tanuj Shori (CEO)
- Revenue: ₹ 2,086 crore (FY2026)
- Number of employees: c. 8,000 (2025)
- Subsidiaries: Urban Money, Interior Company, Azuro, PropsAMC
- Website: www.squareyards.com

Square Yards is an Indian real estate and financial technology company headquartered in Gurugram. Its operations include real estate brokerage, mortgage aggregation, and the development of property management software. The company operates in India, the United Arab Emirates, Australia, and Canada.

== History ==
Founded in 2014 by Tanuj Shori and Kanika Gupta Shori, the company initially focused on primary residential sales and the non-resident Indian (NRI) market in the Persian Gulf. Early venture capital included a $6 million pre-Series A round in 2015 from Singapore and Hong Kong investors. The company entered the mortgage sector between 2016 and 2019, eventually consolidating these operations under the Urban Money brand.

During the COVID-19 pandemic, the company expanded into the home interior and rental management sectors via its subsidiaries Interior Company and Azuro. Its software-as-a-service (SaaS) platform, Edge, was released in 2019 for third-party real estate sales management. In January 2022, Mint reported that Square Yards had begun preparations for an initial public offering. In July 2025, Inc42 reported that the company planned to file a Draft Red Herring Prospectus (DRHP) for an IPO targeting.

== Acquisitions ==
In 2015, Square Yards acquired LUXE and Realizing.in, which were integrated into its platform. The company later acquired Oryden Tech Labs. In 2020, Square Yards acquired Azuro In 2021, it acquired PropVR, a 3D visualisation platform, as well as PropsAMC, a real estate data and analytics firm.

== Funding and financials ==
Total equity funding as of 2025 is approximately $140 million, with backing from Reliance Group, BCCL, and Smilegate Investment. In late 2025, it closed a $35 million round led by Smilegate. For the fiscal year ending March 31, 2025, the company reported revenue of ₹1,410 crore and an EBITDA of ₹46 crore. In June 2026, Square Yards raised ₹900 crore in a debt and equity funding round that valued the company at more than US$1.6 billion.

== Awards and recognition ==
- 2020-2025: Financial Times–Statista Asia-Pacific High-Growth Companies rankings.
- 2025: Forbes India’s DGEMS 200 list.

== See also ==
- Real estate in India
