= ClickPost =

Software company

- Type: Private
- Industry: Logistics software
- Founded: 2015
- Founder: Naman Vijay; Prashant Gupta
- Headquarters: Bengaluru, India
- Area served: Worldwide
- Parent: Felurian Technology Pvt. Ltd.

ClickPost is a logistics software company founded in 2015 by Naman Vijay and Prashant Gupta. Headquartered in Bengaluru, Karnataka, with offices in New Delhi, Mumbai, and New Jersey, the company develops software for automated shipment tracking, returns management, and delivery processing for e-commerce firms.

== History ==
ClickPost was founded in 2015 by Naman Vijay and Prashant Gupta. The company initially launched as a developer tool to assist engineers with courier application programming interface (API) integration. In 2017, it shifted its focus to building a logistics intelligence platform. By 2019, the platform had integrated automated tracking and analytics features. Between 2015 and 2021, ClickPost raised early-stage funding from Inflexor Venture Partners, Athera Ventures, Riverwalk Ventures, and Times Internet. In April 2024, it secured US$6 million in a Series A round led by Inflexor Ventures and Athera Venture Partners, with participation from Rebright Partners and Riverwalk Holdings. In 2025, ClickPost introduced a returns and exchanges module and launched Parth. In July 2025, it entered a strategic partnership with the men's fashion brand Snitch.

== Products and operations ==
ClickPost provides a SaaS platform for managing e-commerce logistics. Its services include shipment tracking, returns processing, carrier allocation, and logistics analytics. In 2024, the company expanded its offerings to include business-to-business logistics tools for partial truckload shipping, supporting distribution to retail stores, distributors, marketplaces, and manufacturing facilities. The company operates in India, Southeast Asia, the Middle East, and North America.
