= Nagesh (disambiguation) =

Nagesh (1933–2009) was an Indian actor and comedian.

Nagesh may also refer to:

- Nagesh Kukunoor (born 1967), Indian filmmaker and actor
- Nagesh Bhonsle, Indian actor and film director
- Nagesh Thiraiyarangam, Tamil-language horror film
- Nagesh Guttula, Indian chess player
- Purushottam Nagesh Oak (1917–2007), Indian historian
- Kududula Nagesh, Indian politician
- B. S. Nagesh (born 1959), Indian businessman, founder of Shoppers Stop
- Lambu Nagesh (died 2017), Indian actor in Kannada cinema

== See also ==
- Nagesh Thiraiyarangam, a 2018 Indian Tamil-language horror drama film
