= KM Plus Media =

Media production company in the Czech Republic

- Industry: Television shows
- Founded: 2009
- Headquarters: Czech Republic
- Key people: Ladislav Švestka

KM Plus Media is a Czech Republic based production house that wildlife documentaries, children titles, lifestyle and travel shows. The company was founded by Ladislav Švestka in 2009. It predominantly works in HD for all broadcast platforms worldwide. Since 2012, KM Plus Media started close co-operation with WildBear Entertainment Australia. In 2014, Times Internet's video-on-demand service Box TV signed a contract to add content from KM plus Media to its catalogue.

== Production ==
- 2017, Inside the Criminal Mind
- 2018, Terrorism Close Calls
- 2018, Empire Games
- 2016-2019, Top 10 Secrets and Mysteries
- 2016, Top 10 Architecture
- 2012, Miracles of Nature
- 2015, M.A.D. World
- 2012, Close Quarter Battle
- 2015, Super Senses
- 2016, Desperate Hours
- 2015, Race of Life
- 2014, Wild Ones
- 2013, My Animal Friends
- 2012, Unusual Cultures
- 2016, Animal Armory
- 2016, Survive the Wild
- 2015, My Animal Friends 3: Underwater Mission
- 2016, Wild Ones 3: World of the Wild
- 2016–2017, Hitler
