= Telangana Societies Registration Act, 2001 =

Telangana legislation governing the registration of societies

Andhra Pradesh Legislative Assembly
- Long title: An Act to consolidate and amend the law relating to the registration of societies
- Territorial extent: Telangana
- Enacted by: Andhra Pradesh Legislative Assembly
- Assented to: 9 October 2001
- Commenced: 10 December 2001

Legislative history
- Bill title: Andhra Pradesh Societies Registration Bill, 1999

Related legislation
- ACT NO. 35 OF 2001
- Status: In force

The Telangana Societies Registration Act, 2001 (Act No. 35 of 2001) is legislation governing the registration and administration of societies in the Indian state of Telangana. It was originally enacted as the Andhra Pradesh Societies Registration Act, 2001, before being adapted for Telangana following the Andhra Pradesh Reorganisation Act, 2014.

The Act provides a legal framework for the registration of eligible societies, their governing documents, membership, executive committees, meetings, financial records and dissolution.

== Legislative history ==
The legislation was originally enacted by the undivided state of Andhra Pradesh in 2001 as the Andhra Pradesh Societies Registration Act, 2001 (Act No. 35 of 2001). It replaced earlier legislation governing the registration of societies in the Andhra and Telangana regions of the former state.

Following the formation of Telangana on 2 June 2014, the legislation was adapted to the new state under section 101 of the Andhra Pradesh Reorganisation Act, 2014. The state government issued G.O.Ms.No.20, Revenue (Registration-II) Department, dated 18 August 2014, adapting the Act and substituting references to Andhra Pradesh with Telangana.

== Provisions ==
=== Registration of societies ===
Section 3 permits seven or more persons to form a society for specified objectives, including art, charity, religion, sports, literature, culture, science, political education, philosophy, dissemination of knowledge or a public purpose.

Sections 4 and 5 provide for the filing of a memorandum of association and bye-laws. These documents include the society's name, objectives and details of its governing committee, together with provisions for its administration.

Section 7 deals with registration by the Registrar and the issue of a registration certificate. Section 8 provides for amendments to the memorandum and bye-laws, while section 9 concerns the filing of an annual list of the managing committee and officers.

=== Management and administration ===
The Act contains provisions concerning the registered office, membership records, accounts, inspection of records and the constitution of the society's committee.

Section 18 provides that registration makes a society a body corporate, with perpetual succession and a common seal. It may acquire and hold property, enter into contracts and institute or defend legal proceedings in its registered name.

Section 20 regulates meetings of the committee and general body. It provides for periodic committee meetings, annual general body meetings and the recording of meeting proceedings.

=== Dissolution ===
The Act also provides a statutory procedure for dissolution and the settlement of a society's affairs, including provisions relating to the appointment and functions of a liquidator.

== Application to resident welfare associations ==
The Act is also relevant to the registration of resident welfare associations and other community organisations in Telangana, subject to the statutory requirements concerning their objectives.

The Telangana government issued Memo No. 8815/Regn.II/2023 on 21 August 2023 concerning the registration of resident welfare associations of apartments, buildings and plots under the Act. The memo referred to section 3(1) and the requirement that an association's objectives fall within the purposes specified by that provision.

== See also ==
- Societies Registration Act, 1860
- Andhra Pradesh Reorganisation Act, 2014
- Real Estate (Regulation and Development) Act, 2016
- Resident welfare association
