= Kush Bhagat =

Indian chess player (born 2009)

- Born: 11 June 2009 (age 17); Mumbai, Maharashtra, India
- Years active: 2012–present
- Parents: Karan Bhagat (father); Shilpa Bhagat (mother)
- Chess career
- Country: India
- Title: FIDE Master (2022)
- Peak rating: 2423 (August 2025)

Kush Bhagat (born 11 June 2009) is an Indian chess player with an International FIDE Rating. His current and the peak rating is 2324. He is a Student at South Mumbai Chess Academy, trained by Balaji Guttula.

== Early life and education ==
Kush Bhagat was born on 11 June 2009, in Mumbai, Maharashtra to Karan Bhagat, an Indian Entrepreneur and Shilpa Bhagat, who is a former Mrs. India World 2013. Kush has a twin sister Kyra Bhagat.

Kush Bhagat is in 11th grade, currently studying at the American School of Bombay.

== Chess career ==
First Indian to win Triple Gold in an official Asian championship. Kush's live rating is an astonishing 2302 Elo points.

On 1 September 2022, his rank among the 13-year-olds was 3rd in India and 20th in the world.

- 1st Western Asian Youth Championship-Al Ain, UAE 2016.
- Triple gold in U-7 boys classical, rapid, and blitz formats and was awarded Candidate Master (CM) title.
- World School Chess Championship- Sochi, Russia 2016, International blitz chess championship, U-7 boys 1st place.
- Won the u-9 National School Championship, Bhubaneshwar held in 2018.
- He beat Grandmaster Vladimir Okhotnik at the age of 10 in a tournament held in Germany in 2019.
- Won gold in the prestigious MSSA Chess Championship 2022, U-14 Boys
- Won gold in the prestigious MSSA Chess Championship 2017/2018, U-10 Boys
- Secured Gold in Maharashtra state U-7 chess championship 2016 held in Mumbai.
- Secured Silver in Maharashtra state schools chess championship under-7, 2016.
- Won Silver in the 10th Asian school chess championship 2014 Taiwan. U-5.
- Leca open, 31 July to 5 August 2022 Portugal, 1st place in the 1800–1999 rating category and 1st place in the Under-14 category.
- Participated in Cannes open Category A in France.
- Won the Koege long sommer championship 2022 in Copenhagen, Denmark from 6 to 10 July 2022.
