= Times Internet =

Indian multinational technology company

- Type: Private
- Industry: Technology
- Founded: 1999; 27 years ago
- Headquarters: Gurgaon, India
- Area served: Worldwide
- Key people: Satyan Gajwani (vice chairman); Puneet Gupt (COO)
- Products: Cricbuzz; MagicBricks; Willow TV
- Services: Entertainment; Lifestyle; Sport; News
- Revenue: ▲₹1,618 crore (US$170 million) (FY25)
- Net income: ▲₹218 crore (US$23 million) (FY25)
- Parent: The Times Group
- Subsidiaries: See below
- Website: www.timesinternet.in

Times Internet is an Indian multinational technology company, based in Gurgaon. It is the digital arm of The Times Group, the largest media conglomerate in India.

Through its venture capital arm TVentures, Times Internet has invested in over 50 start-ups in the technology space such as logistics provider Delhivery, bus aggregating platform Shuttl, ed-tech platform Byju's, and gaming platform MPL, among others.

== History ==
=== 1999–2011: Initial years ===
In its initial years, Times Internet primarily focused on digital media—handling the online versions of The Times Group which is owned by Sahu Jain family. Some major print publications includes The Times of India, The Economic Times, Maharashtra Times and Navbharat Times.

Times Internet ventured into multiple new categories with mixed success. It entered social networking and e-commerce with Indiatimes but was unable to scale the business. The company achieved success with MagicBricks, an online real estate platform launched in 2006 and iDiva, a women's lifestyle portal in 2009.

=== 2012–2019: Investments ===
Times Internet made a series of acquisitions—buying majority stakes in MensXP in 2012, Cricbuzz, Coupondunia and Dineout in 2014, Taskbucks in 2015, 'The Viral Shots' and WillowTV in 2016. In 2016, it also forged a strategic alliance with Haptik, an AI-enabled chatbot service. The company launched its startup accelerator, TLabs in 2012 through which it invested in upcoming digital startups like Delhivery, Pratilipi etc. Times Internet and Adstuck launched a joint venture Alive. Alive was an augmented reality browser to promote brands with print using augmented reality.

Times Internet launched new digital products—Happy Trips in 2014, ET Money and NewsPoint in 2015. In 2015, Times Internet launched Samayam, a website that provides news in Tamil, Telugu and Malayalam languages. In association with HDFC Bank, it launched 'Times Points HDFC Bank Debit Card', an exclusive co-branded debit card in 2016. It also ventured into video streaming with Box TV Limited in 2012 but shut it down in 2016.

In 2016, Times Internet built Colombia, an ad-tech network.

Times Internet launched ET Insure in February 2017, BrainBaazi in February 2018, and ET Prime in April 2018. It acquired 'House of God' in December 2017 and partnered with Tencent to invest $115 million in Gaana in February 2018.

On 28 June 2018, Times Internet acquired MX Player, the world's largest video player for $140 million. On 20 February 2019, Times Internet re-launched MX Player as a platform streaming movies, TV and web shows.

On 24 April 2019, Times Internet participated as a lead investor in $35.5 million (Rs 2.50 billion) Series-A funding round of Mobile Premier League (MPL).

=== 2020–present: Divestments ===
In 2022, Times Internet sold its short video app MX Takatak to ShareChat for around $700 million in a cash-and-stock transaction. This was followed by the sale of table reservation platform Dineout to Swiggy in an all-stock deal valued at $120 million. Later that year, it sold MensXP, iDiva and Hypp to e-commerce rollup company Mensa Brands for an undisclosed amount.

In 2023, after failing to find a buyer, the music streaming service Gaana was consolidated with another Times Group company Entertainment Network India Limited (ENIL) for a consideration of ₹25 lakh.

In 2024, Times Internet sold MX Player to Amazon for around $100 million and ET Money to 360 One WAM for ₹366 crore in stock swap and cash.

== Subsidiaries and products ==
List of digital products owned and managed by Times Internet (as of May 2019)
Product	Description
Ahmedabad Mirror	News portal focused on Ahmedabad
Bangalore Mirror	News portal focused on Bengaluru
Ei Samay	News portal in Bengali
The Economic Times (ET)	Business and financial news platform
ETimes	Entertainment news portal
Indiatimes	News and infotainment platform
Maharashtra Times	News portal in Marathi
Miss Kyra	Entertainment, lifestyle, and fashion news portal
Navbharat Times	News portal in Hindi
NavGujarat Samay	News portal in Gujarati
NewsPoint	News aggregation portal
Pune Mirror	News portal focused on Pune
The Times of India (TOI)	News portal in English
Vijaya Karnataka	News portal in Kannada
Samayam	Infotainment and News portal in Malayalam, Telugu, and Tamil
Astrospeak	Astrology and horoscope service
TimesProperty	News portal for real estate industry
BaaziNow	Live video and gaming platform
CouponDunia	Deals discovery platform
Cricbuzz	Cricket infotainment platform
Databack	Data savings service
Get Me a Shop	Offline to online eCommerce service
Happy Trips	Travel guide and information portal
MagicBricks	Real estate listings and information portal
Speaking Tree	Spirituality platform and network
Taskbucks	Reward based discovery platform
TechGig	Technology platform and community
Times Card	Lifestyle focused credit cards
Times Jobs	Jobs listings portal
Times Now	TV news channel operating in India
Times Prime	Digital subscriptions platform
Whats Hot	Local guide to your city
Willow	TV channel focused on cricket broadcast
Times XP Hindi	Platform for Hindi news
News Point	Content aggregation platform

Former subsidiaries
Product	Description	Note
CricPlay	Cricket Fantasy App	Defunct
Dineout	Table reservation service	Acquired by Swiggy
ET Money	Personal money management service	Acquired by 360 One WAM
Gaana	Music streaming platform	Acquired by ENIL
MX Player	Video player and streaming platform	Acquired by Amazon
iDiva	Women's lifestyle portal	Acquired by Mensa Brands
MensXP	Men's lifestyle portal	Acquired by Mensa Brands
ZigWheels	Automotive industry news, reviews and advice.	Acquired by CarDekho Group
