= Terrorism Close Calls =

- Genre: Documentary
- Starring: David Bitkower; Don Borelli; Pete King
- Countries of origin: United States; Czech Republic
- Original language: English
- No. of seasons: 1
- No. of episodes: 10

Production
- Running time: 47–49 min.
- Production companies: KM Plus Media and Big Media

Original release
- Network: Netflix
- Release: October 26, 2018

Terrorism Close Calls is a 2018 American docu-series, exploring the terrorist attacks that almost happened or were not executed as planned. Each episodes explores a declassified terrorist scheme that had intended but failed to cause mass casualties.

== Premise ==
Terrorism Close Calls explores the terrorist attacks that almost happened or were not executed as planned. Each episode follows law enforcement officers and terrorism specialists as they discuss near catastrophes and reveals the techniques, plans and tricks used by authorities to apprehend those responsible.

== Cast ==
- David Bitkower
- Don Borelli
- Pete King

== Release ==
It was released on October 26, 2018 on the streaming service Netflix.
