= Suhaani Lohia =

Indian chess player (born 2009)

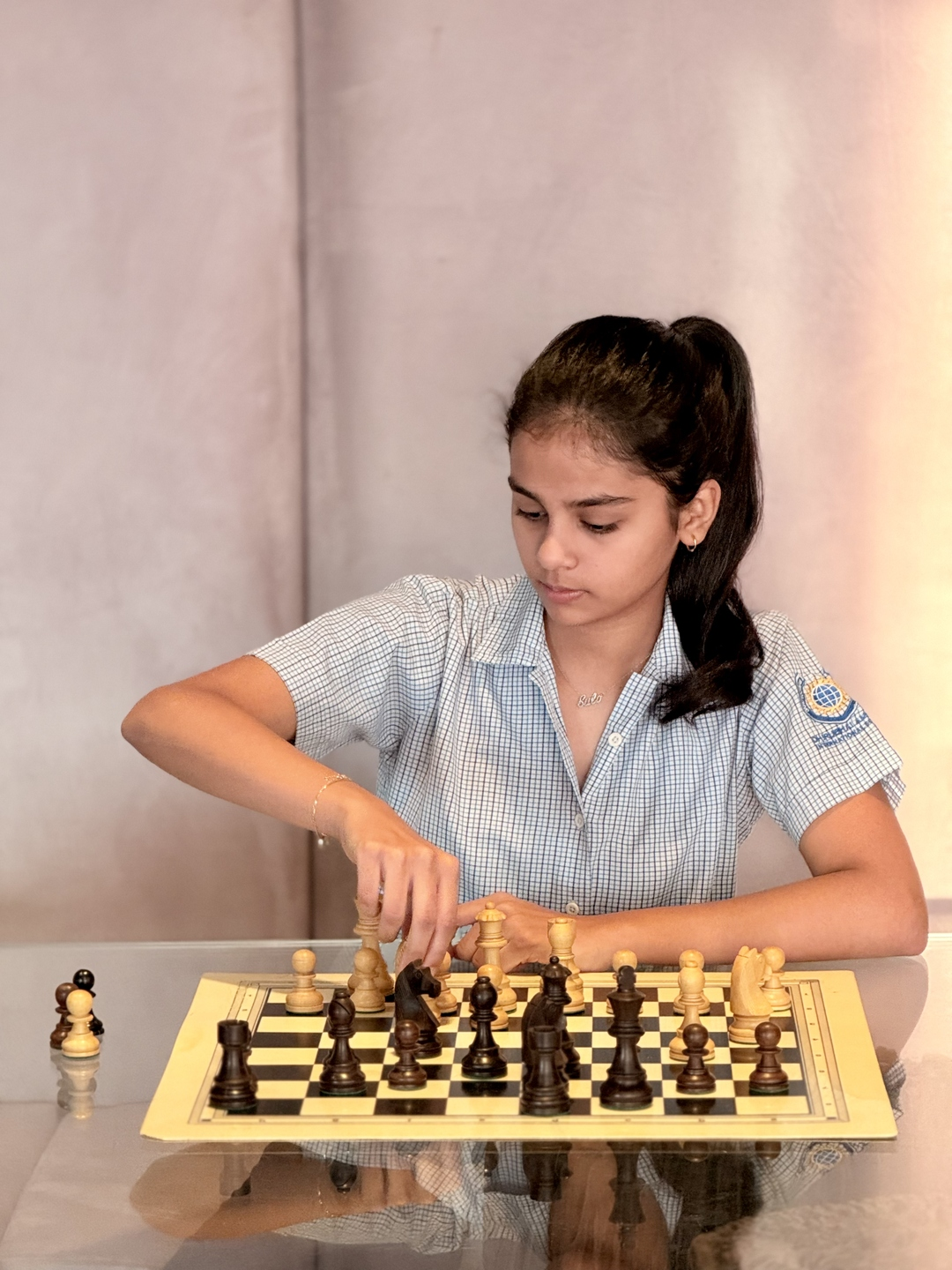

Personal information
- Born: 11 August 2009 (age 17) Mumbai, Maharashtra, India

Chess career
- Country: India
- Title: Woman Candidate Master (2016)
- Peak rating: 1783 (March 2024)

Suhaani Lohia (born 11 August 2009) is an Indian chess player with an International FIDE Rating. She is one of the youngest individuals to earn the Woman Candidate Master. (WCM) title in India. Her current and the peak rating is 1783. She is a student at South Mumbai Chess Academy, trained by Balaji Guttula.

== Early life and education ==
Suhaani Lohia was born on 11 August 2009 in Mumbai, Maharashtra India to Sheetal Lohia and Sushir Lohia. She has a brother, Siddhanth Lohia, who is also an international FIDE chess player. Suhaani was introduced to chess at an early age as she used to accompany her family to her brother's chess tournaments worldwide. She is a student at the Dhirubhai Ambani International School.

== Chess career ==
Suhaani began playing chess at the age of four. She first competed in the Under-5 age category of the National Schools Chess Championship in Delhi, where she won a bronze medal. As of March 2024, Suhaani has a FIDE rating of 1783.

FIDE, the international governing body of chess, featured Suhaani's picture on the cover of their online booklet for the "Chess in Schools" global initiative.

Throughout her career, Suhaani has won numerous awards and accolades. Some of her notable achievements include:

- Becoming the 2nd youngest Woman Candidate Master in India as of June 2023.
- Ranking in the top 6 amongst girls in the world chess rankings in 2016.
- Winning gold in Under 14 girls at the 4th ISSO National Chess Championship 2022.
- Winning bronze at the Under 7 Asian Schools Chess Championship at Tehran, Iran.
- Winning bronze at the Under 9 Asian Schools Blitz Chess Championship 2018 in China.
- Winning bronze at the Under 8 Commonwealth Chess Championship 2017.
- Being part of Team India which won gold at the Asian Schools Chess Championship in Sri Lanka in 2018.
- Winning silver at the Under 9 National Schools Chess Championship 2018.
- Winning bronze at the Under 9 National Chess Championship 2018.
- Winning bronze at the Under 7 National Chess Championship held in Pondicherry 2016.
- Winning bronze in the Under 5 National Schools Chess Championship 2014.
- Placing second amongst females at the Noisiel Open Tournament in France 2022.
- Winning gold in the Maharashtra State Rapid Chess Championship 2019 in the Under-11 Girls category.
- Winning gold/silver at the prestigious MSSA Chess Championships in 2018, 2019, 2020, 2021, and 2022.

Suhaani is coached by FM Balaji Guttula, the Chief Coach of SMCA, and Pavan BNB, a senior coach at SMCA, among other coaches.

== Impact and contributions ==
Alongside her brother, Suhaani has started a Non-Profit called Chess For All. Through this initiative, she has taught chess to many underprivileged children of various orphanages and NGOs in India and donated chess boards. She has also donated all her price money to CM Relief Fund.

In January 2026, Suhaani founded Vision Beyond Sight, a comprehensive fundraiser aimed at empowering visually impaired chess players through equal access to resources and opportunities. Developed in collaboration with the All India Chess Federation for the Blind (AICFB), the initiative provides practical support including talking chess clocks, professional coaching, essential equipment, and tournament travel assistance for visually impaired players. The fundraiser focuses on removing barriers to entry for blind chess players, enabling them to compete on equal terms with sighted players. Chess offers rare fairness because the rules do not bend for anyone, allowing visually impaired competitors to participate with the same rules and pressure as sighted players. The fundraiser has gained significant visibility through media coverage and online platforms, including a fundraiser video on YouTube about the initiative.

== Yoga ==
In July 2025, at the age of 15, Suhaani became the youngest certified teacher at the Sri Sri School of Yoga, officially certified by the Art of Living ashram in Bengaluru. She is now qualified to guide adults through yoga and breathing techniques, as reported by Mumbai Mirror.
