= Willow (TV channel) =

American cricket sports television channel

- Country: United States and Canada
- Headquarters: BCCL Worldwide Inc. Redwood City, CA

Programming
- Picture format: 1080i HDTV

Ownership
- Owner: Times Internet
- Parent: The Times Group

History
- Launched: August 27, 2010; 16 years ago

Links
- Website: willow.tv

Willow is an American pay television sports channel which is devoted to airing overseas cricket events, including live and recorded matches and other cricket-related programming in English, with the majority of its advertising targeted towards the Indian subcontinent diaspora in North America. The network is carried both as a traditional subscription-television channel which airs on pay-TV providers, and a paid streaming service available online.

The network was launched in the U.S. on August 27, 2010, and in Canada on May 14, 2019. The channel merged with NEO Cricket's American network in February 2013 as that provider drew down their American operations with the Willow name remaining. Times Internet, part of the Times Group, bought the service in 2016. In April 2024, coinciding with the 2024 Indian Premier League and ahead of the Men's T20 World Cup, Willow was rebranded and integrated with Times Group's cricket website Cricbuzz.

Willow has operated an Internet portal for live streaming of cricket events at www.willow.tv since 2003 for a monthly subscription fee. Willow has driven various innovations in the coverage of cricket, like video-based live scorecards and editorials. The website provides subscribers with video streams available on mobile apps and a streaming feed. A dedicated app for Willow was added for Apple TV on June 24, 2014.

Willow has been the subject of complaints about its billing practices, including making it impossible to unsubscribe through the website or app, and ignoring repeated emails requesting cancellations. They have since made it possible to unsubscribe through their website.

== Match rights ==
Willow holds the rights to some of the matches of the following teams and leagues:

=== ICC Events ===
- All ICC events from November 2015 to 2023 (Included in the new eight-year period are 18 ICC tournaments, including two ICC Cricket World Cups (2019 and 2023), one ICC Champions Trophy tournaments (2017) and three ICC World Twenty20 tournaments (2016, 2021 and 2022) and one ICC World Test Championship tournaments (2021).

==== ICC Events 2015–present ====
ICC major global events

- 2016 ICC World Twenty20 in India
- 2017 ICC Champions Trophy in England & Wales
- 2019 ICC Cricket World Cup in England & Wales
- 2021 ICC T20 World Cup in UAE & Oman
- 2022 ICC T20 World Cup in Australia
- 2023 ICC World Test Championship final in England
- 2023 ICC Cricket World Cup in India
- 2024 Men's T20 World Cup
- 2025 ICC Champions Trophy
- 2026 Men's T20 World Cup

ICC qualifying events

- 2015 ICC World Twenty20 Qualifier – Ireland and Scotland
- 2018 ICC Cricket World Cup Qualifier – Zimbabwe
- 2019 ICC T20 World Cup Qualifier – United Arab Emirates
- 2023 ICC Cricket World Cup Qualifier – Zimbabwe

Other ICC events

- 2016 ICC Under-19 Cricket World Cup – Bangladesh
- 2017 ICC Women's Cricket World Cup – England and Wales
- 2018 ICC Under-19 Cricket World Cup – New Zealand
- 2018 ICC Women's World Twenty20 – West Indies
- 2020 ICC Under-19 Cricket World Cup – South Africa
- 2021 ICC Women's Cricket World Cup – New Zealand
- 2022 ICC Under-19 Cricket World Cup – West Indies
- 2022 ICC Women's T20 World Cup – South Africa

=== League and other competitions ===
- Pakistan Super League (USA / Canada)
- KFC T20 Big Bash League (Only USA)
- Indian Premier League (USA / Canada)
- Caribbean Premier League (West Indies and USA)
- Lanka Premier League (USA / Canada)
- Minor League Cricket (Only USA)
- Major League Cricket (Only USA)
- Bangladesh Premier League (USA / Canada)
- Nepal Premier League (USA/ Canada)
- International League T20 (USA/ Canada)

=== Former rights ===
- New Zealand national cricket team (home match rights until 2013; home match rights now held by ESPN+)
