= 360 One WAM =

Wealth management firm established in 2008

360 ONE WAM
- Trade name: BSE: 542772; NSE: 360ONE
- Formerly: IIFL Wealth
- Type: Public
- Industry: Wealth management, asset management
- Founded: 2008; 18 years ago
- Founders: Karan Bhagat; Yatin Shah
- Headquarters: Mumbai, India
- Area served: Worldwide
- Key people: Karan Bhagat (Managing Director and CEO); Yatin Shah (CEO of 360 ONE Wealth)
- Revenue: ₹826 crore (US$88 million) (Q3 FY26)
- AUM: ₹7.11 lakh crore (US$76 billion) (Q3 FY26)
- Number of employees: 1,700 (December 2025)
- Subsidiaries: See list below; 360 ONE Asset Management; 360 ONE Alternates Asset Management; 360 ONE Prime; 360 ONE Capital; ET Money
- Rating: A1+ (CRISIL); A1+ (ICRA)
- Website: www.360.one

360 ONE WAM Limited is an Indian financial services company heaquartered in Mumbai, India. Established in 2008, the company operates in the wealth and asset management. Its business divisions comprise investment banking, institutional broking, and portfolio management. As of 2025, the company reported assets under management (AUM) of approximately ₹7.11 lakh crore (US$79 billion). It operates through 27 offices in India and maintains a presence in five other countries.

== History ==
The company was incorporated on 17 January 2008 as IIFL Wealth Management Limited, a subsidiary of IIFL Holdings. In its early years, the firm transitioned to a fee-based advisory structure.

In 2014, the company acquired a majority stake in India Alternatives Investment Advisors Pvt Ltd, a private equity advisory firm.

In October 2015, General Atlantic acquired a 21.6% stake in the firm for approximately ₹1,122 crore (US$131 million). In 2018, the company raised ₹745 crore (US$87 million) from investors including General Atlantic.

In 2018, it purchased Chennai-based Wealth Advisors India for ₹235 crore (US$27 million). In 2019, the company demerged from IIFL Holdings to become an independent entity, listing on the NSE and BSE on 19 September 2019. In 2020, it acquired L&T Capital Markets, a subsidiary of L&T Finance Holdings, for ₹2.3 billion, adding ₹100 billion in AUM.

In March 2022, Bain Capital agreed to acquire a 24.9% equity stake for approximately ₹3,680 crore, leading to a partial exit by General Atlantic and Fairfax India. In November 2022, the firm rebranded as 360 ONE, renaming its divisions as 360 ONE Wealth and 360 ONE Asset.

In 2024, it acquired ET Money for ₹3.7 billion, and in 2025 announced plans to acquire Batlivala & Karani Securities and Batlivala & Karani Finserv for ₹18.8 billion. In April 2025, 360 ONE acquired UBS's onshore wealth management business in India for ₹307 crore, while UBS acquired warrants representing a 4.95% stake in 360 ONE.

== Operations and structure ==
The group's operations are divided across specialised subsidiaries. The wealth management division handles investment advisory and estate planning via 360 ONE Distribution Services and 360 ONE Portfolio Managers, while lending services are provided by 360 ONE Prime. The asset management arm, comprising 360 ONE Asset Management and 360 ONE Alternates, oversees public and private market investments. Following the 2024 acquisition of ET Money, the company manages mutual fund distribution through digital channels. Institutional operations are conducted via 360 ONE Capital Market and 360 ONE Treasury Solutions.

== Collaborations and publications ==
The firm periodically publishes reports on wealth trends. Notable publications include The Wealth Index, produced with Wealth-X (2018) and CRISIL (2024), and various annual rich lists compiled with Hurun India between 2019 and 2023.
