= 360 One Wealth =

360 ONE Wealth
- Type: Private
- Industry: Wealth management
- Founded: 2008
- Founders: Karan Bhagat, Yatin Shah
- Headquarters: Mumbai, India
- Key people: Karan Bhagat (Founder, Managing Director and CEO); Yatin Shah (Co-founder of 360 ONE and CEO of 360 ONE Wealth)
- Total assets: ₹7.11 lakh crore AUM (December 2025)
- Parent: 360 ONE WAM Limited
- Website: Official website

360 ONE Wealth is an Indian wealth management company that is part of 360 ONE WAM Limited, a financial services group. It was rebranded from IIFL Wealth Management to 360 ONE Wealth in November 2022. As of December 2025, 360 ONE WAM reported assets under management of over ₹7.11 lakh crore (US$79 billion).

== History ==
The company was incorporated on 17 January 2008 as IIFL Wealth Management Limited, a subsidiary of the IIFL Group, with initial capital of US$3 million. It was founded by Karan Bhagat, Yatin Shah and Amit Shah.

In October 2015, General Atlantic acquired a 21.6% equity stake in the company for ₹1,122 crore. Between 2018 and 2019, the company acquired Chennai-based Wealth Advisors India for ₹235 crore and Bengaluru-based Altiore Advisors. During the same period, a consortium including HDFC Standard Life and Steadview Capital acquired a 5.1% stake for ₹745 crore.

Following a 2019 demerger of the IIFL Group sanctioned by the National Company Law Tribunal, IIFL Wealth Management became an independent entity. It was listed on the National Stock Exchange and the Bombay Stock Exchange on 19 September 2019. In April 2020, the company acquired L&T Capital Markets Limited for ₹230 crore. The acquisition added approximately ₹10,000 crore in assets under management.

In March 2022, Bain Capital acquired a 24.98% stake in the company for approximately ₹3,679.95 crore. The transaction included the sale of shares held by General Atlantic and FIH Mauritius Investments. The company was rebranded as 360 One in November 2022.

In June 2024, the company acquired the digital investment platform ET Money from Times Internet for ₹365.8 crore. In April 2025, it acquired UBS AG's onshore wealth management business in India for ₹307 crore.

The company's asset division received ₹2,000 crore in commitments for its private investment in public equity (PIPE) strategy.

== Services and operations ==
360 ONE Wealth provides wealth management services to ultra-high-net-worth individuals, high-net-worth individuals and family offices. Its services include investment advisory, product distribution, lending, estate planning and corporate treasury. The company also provides investment and asset management services involving public equities, private equity, private credit and real assets.

It has operations in the United States, Canada, Dubai and Singapore.
