= Balaji Guttula =

Indian chess player (born 1979)

Balaji Guttulla
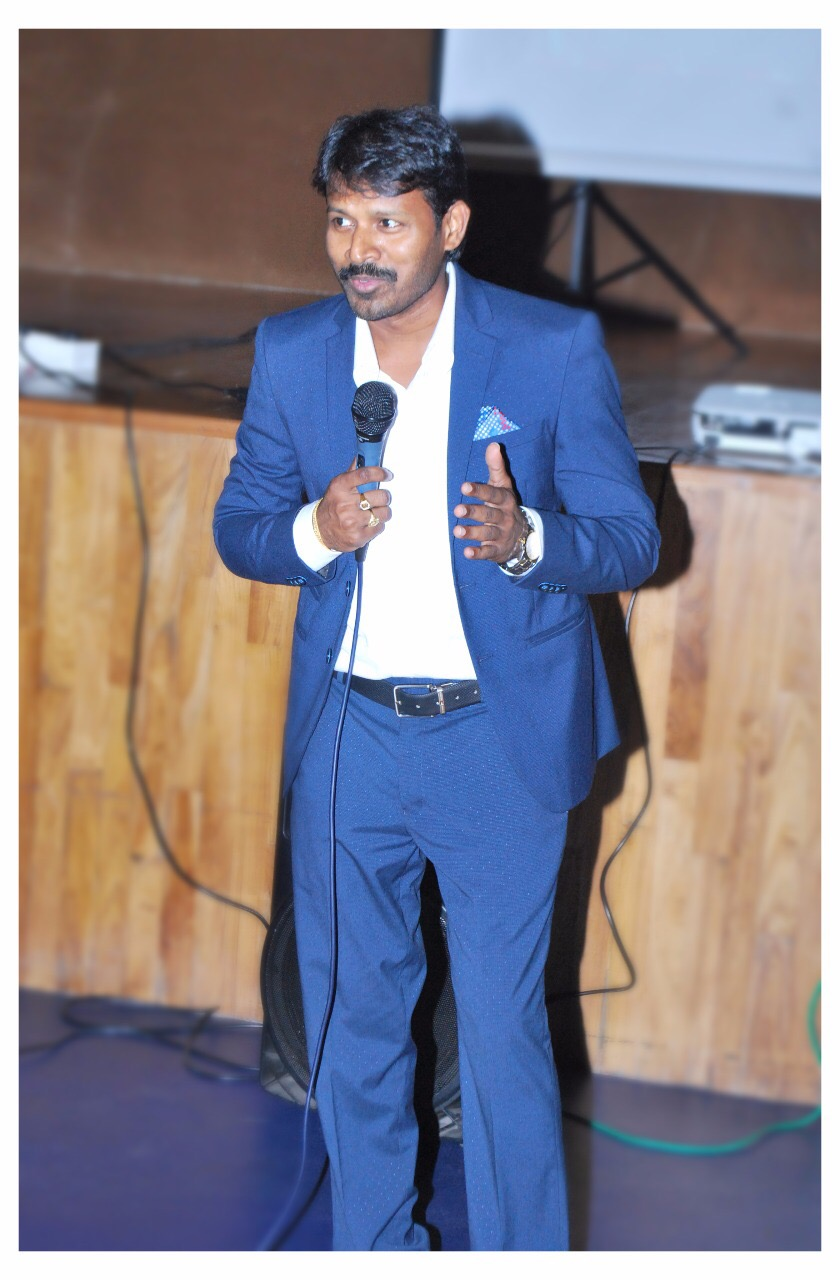

Personal information
- Born: 20 May 1979 (age 47) Mumbai, Maharashtra, India

Chess career
- Country: India
- Title: FIDE Master (2009)
- Peak rating: 2320 (July 2005)

Balaji Guttula (born 20 May 1979) is an Indian chess player holding FIDE Master and FIDE Trainer title. He achieved his peak rating of 2320 in 2005 and was conferred with the title of FIDE Master in 2009. He has coached and mentored many students like Kush Bhagat, Shiven Khosla, and Suhaani Lohia in a coaching career spanning over two decades. He founded South Mumbai Chess Academy in 1996 with his brother Durga Nagesh Guttula.

== Early life and education ==
Balaji Guttula was born on 20 May 1979 in Mumbai, Maharashtra, India, in a South Indian family. He did his primary schooling at AES School in Wadala. He then shifted to Rajahmundry, Andhra Pradesh. He returned to Mumbai after completing his 10th standard, according to his interview.

Balaji learned to play Chess from his neighbours accidentally, in Rajahmundry at the age of 11 and began participating in the tournaments at 15. He is a Director and the Chief Coach at South Mumbai Chess Academy, Mumbai.

== Coaching career ==
Balaji is a coach for competitive tournaments from nearly two decades and has accompanied the Indian Team as an official delegate to the Asian Schools Chess Championship held in Tashkent, Uzbekistan in 2019.

Balaji has trained over a hundred students some are listed.

- CM Kush Bhagat
- IM Shiven Khosla
- WCM Suhaani Lohia
- Bhaven Shah
- CM Advait Bagri
- AIM Siddhanth Lohia
- CM Rishab Shah
- Aditya Patil
- Adhvay Dhoot
