= Systematic investment plan =

SIP investment

A systematic investment plan (SIP) is an investment vehicle offered by many mutual funds to investors, allowing them to invest small amounts periodically instead of lump sums. The frequency of investment is usually weekly, monthly or quarterly.

== How it Works and Key Benefits ==
A Systematic Investment Plan works on a simple principle: investing a fixed amount of money at regular intervals (such as weekly, monthly, or quarterly) into a specific mutual fund. The process is typically automated, with the amount being debited directly from the investor's bank account. When the predetermined amount is invested, it purchases units of the mutual fund at the prevailing Net asset value (NAV) for that day. Since the investment amount is fixed, the number of units purchased varies with the NAV. This mechanism leads to the primary benefits of SIPs:

- Rupee Cost Averaging: This is the core advantage of investing through a SIP. When the market is down and the NAV is low, the fixed investment amount buys more units. Conversely, when the market is up and the NAV is high, the same amount buys fewer units. Over the long term, this averages out the cost per unit and mitigates the risk of investing a large sum at a market peak. This strategy frees the investor from the challenge of trying to time the market.
- The Power of Compounding: SIPs are highly effective for long-term wealth creation due to the principle of compounding. Compounding means earning returns not just on the principal investment, but also on the accumulated returns. By investing regularly over a long period, even small amounts can grow into a significant corpus.
- Disciplined Investing: The automated nature of SIPs instills a disciplined saving habit. By making investing a regular, mandatory expense rather than a one-time decision, it helps investors stay committed to their financial goals without being swayed by short-term market volatility.
- Convenience and Flexibility: SIPs are easy to set up and manage. Most plans are also flexible, allowing investors to stop their contributions, or increase or decrease the investment amount at any time, depending on their financial situation.

== Types of SIPs ==
Mutual fund companies offer several types of SIPs to cater to the varying needs of investors. Some common variants include:

- Top-Up SIP (or Step-Up SIP): This facility allows investors to automatically increase their SIP contribution at regular intervals, such as half-yearly or annually. It is ideal for salaried individuals who expect their income to grow over time and wish to align their investments with their increasing surplus.
- Flexible SIP (or Flex SIP): A flexible SIP allows investors to adjust their investment amount based on their cash flow or their assessment of market conditions. An investor can choose to invest a lower amount when facing a cash crunch or a higher amount when they have a surplus, without stopping the SIP.
- Perpetual SIP: When setting up a SIP, investors usually specify an end date. A perpetual SIP, however, continues without any specified end date. The investor has the freedom to redeem the investment or stop the SIP whenever they choose. This is suitable for long-term goals where the exact time horizon is not fixed.
- Trigger SIP: This is a more advanced option where an investor can set specific triggers for their SIP investment. For example, they can set a rule to invest more if the market index falls by a certain percentage, or to redeem a portion if their investment value reaches a particular target.

== Risks and Considerations ==
While SIPs offer several advantages, they are not entirely without risk, as the investments are ultimately subject to market fluctuations. Key considerations include:

- Market Risk: The returns from a SIP are not guaranteed and depend entirely on the performance of the underlying mutual fund scheme. If the market performs poorly over a long period, it is possible for the investment value to fall below the total amount invested. This is known as market risk or systematic risk.
- No Protection Against Steep Falls: While rupee cost averaging helps mitigate volatility, it does not protect an investment from a prolonged bear market or a sudden, steep market crash. In such scenarios, the value of all accumulated units can fall sharply.
- Scheme Selection Risk: The success of a SIP heavily depends on the choice of the mutual fund scheme. A poorly managed fund or a fund that is unsuitable for the investor's risk profile can lead to suboptimal returns, regardless of the disciplined investment approach.

== See also ==
- Recurring deposit
- Dollar cost averaging
