= Nagesh Guttula =

Indian chess player (born 1981)

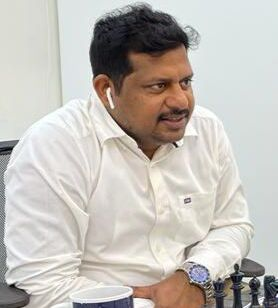

Personal information
- Born: Durga Nagesh Guttula; 11 October 1981 (age 44) Mumbai, India

Chess career
- Country: India
- Peak rating: 1706 (July 2025)

Durga Nagesh Guttula (born 11 October 1981) is an Indian chess player with an International FIDE rating. He is also a Chess Coach, a reputed chess trainer in Mumbai and one of the most sought after chess coaches in India.Most of his students frequently win medals and accolades at the state, national, and International levels.He and his elder brother, Balaji Guttula, founded the South Mumbai Chess Academy, a renowned brand known as SMCA, in 1996, conceptualised by their father, Surya Chandra Rao Guttula.

He was the administration head of the World Junior chess championship that concluded in Mumbai at Hotel Renaissance, Powai in October 2019.

== Early life and education ==
Durga Nagesh Guttula was born on 11 October 1981 in Mumbai, Maharashtra in a South Indian family to the couple Surya chandra Rao and Aruna. He completed his education in MBA. He is married to Kanaka Chandra, they have two children, Shivadikrit and Sumukha Jalsesh."

== Professional chess career ==
Durga Nagesh Guttula has coached many players, who won National and International Chess Championships. Some of them are

- Siddhanth Lohia
- Suhaani Lohia
- Dev Shah
- Ananyashree Birla
- Armaan Gala
- Ananya Gupta.
- Ashwath Kaushik
- Nivaan Khandhadia
- Anishka Biyani
- Aryaveer Pittie
- Avyaay Garg
- Yohan Faridun Dotiwala
