= Karan Bhagat =

Indian entrepreneur and investor

- Education: IIM Bangalore, 2001
- Occupations: Founder, MD & CEO of 360 One WAM
- Organization: 360 One WAM
- Spouse: Shilpa Bhagat

Karan Bhagat is an Indian entrepreneur and investor, who is the founder, CEO and MD of 360 ONE WAM, an Indian wealth management firm. He has been listed in fortuneindia.com's 40 Under 40 list in 2016 and 2017.

Karan Bhagat was honoured with the Economic Times 'Asia's Promising Business Leaders 2021-22'.

In the 27th edition of the EY Entrepreneur of the Year Awards held in February 2026, Karan Bhagat was the winner in the services category.

== Early life and education ==
He hails from a Marwari business family of Kolkata. Bhagat completed his MBA from Indian Institute of Management in 2001.

== Career ==
Before joining IIM, he ran a travel agency in 1996 for a brief while. Later, he joined Kotak Mahindra Bank and served as the head of Kotak Mahindra Bank's wealth management practice for Mumbai.

In April 2008, Bhagat and Yatin Shah founded IIFL Wealth Management Ltd. as a unit of IIFL Holdings.

His company IIFL Wealth sold a 21.6% stake in the wealth unit to General Atlantic for ₹ 1.2 billion (USD173 million) in October 2015. As of September 2019, IIFL Wealth & Asset Management has around Rs.1,70,000 crore of assets under advice, distribution and management. He is also an angel investor in half-a-dozen startups.

In November 2022, the company rebranded as 360 ONE, renaming its wealth management division as 360 ONE Wealth and its asset management division as 360 ONE Asset.

== Awards and recognition ==
Year	Award(s)	Notes
2015	Youth Business Tycoons Under 40 by Indiatimes.com	
2016	Fortune India's 40 Under 40 list	
2017	Fortune India's 40 Under 40 list	
2017	The Economic Times's 40 under 40 list 2017	
2017	Indian Wealth Management - Award for Excellence by Hubbis	
2018	Best Wealth Management Thought Leader - India Wealth Awards	
2017-18	Global Indian of the Year - India's Greatest Brands & Leaders	
2017-18	Global Indian of the Year by URS asiaone.co.in	
2018	Finalist for the Entrepreneur of the Year India Awards	
