= Cricbuzz =

Sports news website for cricket

- Website type: Cricket news and score
- Available in: English, Hindi, Telugu, Tamil, Kannada, Marathi and Bengali
- Headquarters: Bengaluru, India
- Owner: Times Internet
- Creators: Pankaj Chhaparwal; Piyush Agrawal; Pravin Hegde
- Parent: The Times Group
- Website: www.cricbuzz.com
- Commercial: Yes
- Registration: Optional
- Users: 50 million (January 2018)
- Launched: 1 November 2004; 21 years ago
- Current status: Active

Cricbuzz is a cricket news website owned by Times Internet. It features news, articles and live coverage of cricket matches including videos, text commentary, player stats and team rankings. It also offers a mobile app.

== History ==
Cricbuzz was created by Pankaj Chhaparwal, Piyush Agrawal, and Pravin Hegde in 2004. In 2010, Cricbuzz started developing a mobile app for live cricket news and scores.

Cricbuzz was the seventh most searched for website in India in 2014. It claimed to have 50 million users during the 2014 Indian Premier League and 2.6 billion page views in January 2015.

In November 2014, Times Internet, a subsidiary of Times of India acquired a majority stake in Cricbuzz for an undisclosed sum. The website continued to be managed by the original founders. In January 2015, Times Internet-owned GoCricket was merged into Cricbuzz. GoCricket's website was redirected to Cricbuzz and the GoCricket mobile app was also merged with that of Cricbuzz.

In August 2015, Cricbuzz was named the title sponsor of the Indian Test tour of Sri Lanka.

Cricbuzz hired commentator Harsha Bhogle as ‘Voice of Cricket in India’ in September 2016.

Cricbuzz was reported to be the second most downloaded news app in the world for the second quarter of 2019.

Ahead of the 2024 IPL in April 2024, Willow—a sister pay television cricket channel and streaming service in the United States and Canada—was integrated into Cricbuzz in these markets, with the service being rebranded as "Willow by Cricbuzz" and its subscription content (including regional rights to the IPL and ICC tournaments, among other properties) becoming accessible from within the Cricbuzz app.

In February 2025, Cricbuzz launched its fantasy sports platform, Cricbuzz11. In May 2025, Dream11's parent company Dream Sports acquired a minority stake in Cricbuzz and Willow TV for $50 million.

== Cricbuzz Live ==
In 2018, Cricbuzz launched Cricbuzz Live, a cricket analysis and discussion video show covering international cricket and tournaments including the Indian Premier League.

The show features pre-match, mid-innings, and post-match discussions involving presenters, commentators, journalists, and former international cricketers. Personalities associated with the program have included Harsha Bhogle, Virender Sehwag, Zaheer Khan, Michael Vaughan, Adam Gilchrist, Shaun Pollock, Simon Doull, Dinesh Karthik, Parthiv Patel, Murali Vijay, Mohammed Shami, Ajay Jadeja, Piyush Chawla, Lisa Sthalekar, Murali Kartik, Rohan Gavaskar, Pommie Mbangwa, Joy Bhattacharjya, Gaurav Kapur, Danish Sait, and Gautam Bhimani.

The program is distributed through the Cricbuzz website and mobile applications.

== See also ==
- Cricinfo – Sports news website for cricket
- CricketArchive – Sports website for cricket
