= Entertainment Network India Limited =

Indian media company pvt ltd

Entertainment Network India Limited (ENIL) (BSE: 532700, NSE: ENIL) is a subsidiary of Times Infotainment Media Limited, the holding company promoted by The Times Group, incorporated in 1999. ENIL is the only listed company in the otherwise privately held Times Group. It is listed on Bombay Stock Exchange and the National Stock Exchange of India. Its subsidiaries include the Radio Mirchi national radio network and Gaana music streaming service.

== History ==
Times Group provided private FM service along with the Government of India under the brand name of Times FM. This station operated in Delhi, Calcutta, Chennai and Goa from 1993 to 1998 before the central government did not renew the contract.

After cutting ties with the government, ENIL was formed in June 1999 post the first phase of licensing. The Ministry of Information and Broadcasting offered 108 frequencies across 40 cities, and ENIL got the maximum of them. It started the operations of the Radio Mirchi network with the launch of its services in Indore on 4 October 2001. The company simultaneously started operations in seven more cities. In the second phase, the company got 25 more frequencies. That took the count of total number of stations to 32.

In 2011, the out-of-home segment won a 20-year advertising contract with New Delhi Airport, Terminal 3.

in 2024, ENIL partnered with MGID to expand native advertising in India through the MPing network.
