= ZigWheels =

Indian automotive and motorcycling website

Zigwheels
- Website type: Privately held company
- Available in: English
- Owner: girnarsoft.com
- Website: zigwheels.com zigwheels.ph oto.com oto.com.sg
- Current status: Active
- Written in: HTML, LAMP

ZigWheels.com is an automotive and motorcycling website based in India. ZigWheels provides automotive industry news, reviews and advice to consumers. Earlier a part of Times Internet, a subsidiary of the Times of India Group, ZigWheels was acquired by CarDekho, a subsidiary of GirnarSoft, signalling consolidation in the online auto classifieds space.

In 2015, Zigwheels expanded to multiple South East Asian markets as well, some notable expansions include ZigWheels Philippines and Oto Singapore.

ZigWheels was awarded the most popular automotive website of the year in 2013.
