= List of Indian states by rate of home ownership =

This is a list of Indian states and territories ranked in order of percentage of families owning a house as per the Census of India 2011.

According to the 2011 Census, Bihar had the highest home ownership rate, at 96.8% of all households. Among states, Sikkim had the lowest home ownership rate, at 64.5%. Among union territories, Lakshadweep had the highest rate, while Daman & Diu had the lowest. The national average stood at 86.6%.

== States by Home Ownership ==
Rank	States	Families owning Houses 2011 (%)
1	Bihar	96.8
2	Jammu and Kashmir	96.7
3	Uttar Pradesh	94.7
4	Manipur	93.6
5	Rajasthan	93.2
6	Tripura	91.9
7	Madhya Pradesh	76.9
8	Kerala	90.7
9	Odisha	90.4
10	Chhattisgarh	90.2
11	Jharkhand	89.3
11	West Bengal	89.3
13	Punjab	88.9
14	Haryana	88.4
15	Assam	87.9
16	Himachal Pradesh	87.2
	India	86.6
17	Gujarat	83.9
18	Uttarakhand	82.9
19	Meghalaya	82.0
20	Maharashtra	81.1
21	Goa	78.9
22	Andhra Pradesh (includes Telangana)	78.5
23	Tamil Nadu	74.6
24	Karnataka	74.3
25	Nagaland	73.8
26	Arunachal Pradesh	68.3
27	Mizoram	65.8
28	Sikkim	64.5
U/T 1	Lakshadweep	83.5
U/T 2	Delhi	68.2
U/T 3	Puducherry	64.9
U/T 4	A & N Islands	57.3
U/T 5	Dadra & Nagar Haveli	55.6
U/T 6	Chandigarh	47.7
U/T 7	Daman & Diu	38.3
