= ATS Infrastructure =

Indian real state company

ATS Infrastructure Ltd.

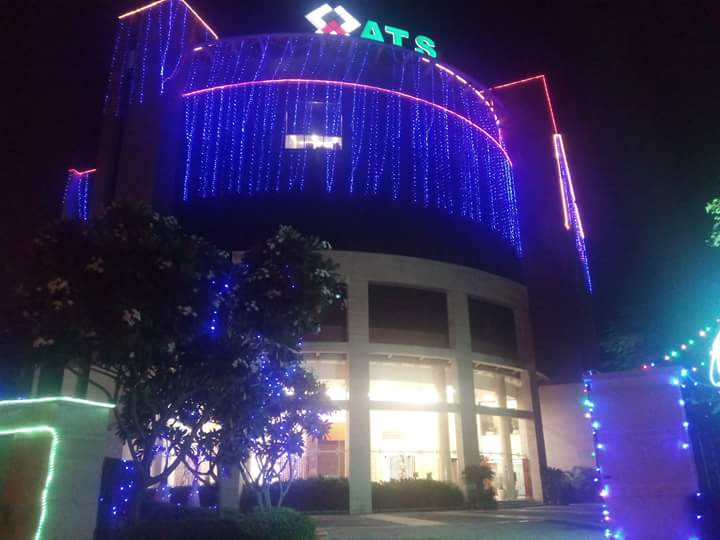
- ATS office
- Trade name: ATS Group
- Type: Limited by shares
- Industry: Construction & Development
- Founded: January 1, 1998; 28 years ago in Noida
- Founder: Getamber Anand
- Headquarters: Noida, Uttar Pradesh, India
- Number of locations: "In 8 States of India"
- Key people: Bani G. Anand (Vice Chairperson); Udaivir Anand (Managing Director)
- Products: Luxury Apartments; Commercial Space
- Owner: Getamber Anand
- Number of employees: 4500+ (2022)
- Subsidiaries: ATS HomeKraft
- Website: www.atsgreens.com

ATS Infrastructure Limited (ATS) is an Indian real estate company, founded in 1998 by Getamber Anand. Mr. Getamber Anand is the present CMD of ATS Infrastructure Limited. Its Headquarter is located in Noida, Uttar Pradesh. Investors of this companies includes financial institutions like HDFC Fund and ICICI Prudential AMC.

== History ==
ATS Infrastructure Ltd. was established in 1998 by Getamber Anand as a residential real estate developer focused on Delhi and the National Capital Region (NCR). In 2011, HDFC Fund invested ₹200 crore in one of the company's projects in New Delhi. In 2013, ATS announced an investment of ₹2,000 crore in a project in Mohali.

== Allegations of fraud ==
Money laundering has been alleged.
