= Radio Mirchi =

Indian national radio network

- India
- Frequency: 98.3 MHz (exceptions in some cities)

Programming
- Format: Contemporary hit radio

Ownership
- Owner: ENIL
- Sister stations: Mirchi Love, Mirchi Indies

History
- First air date: 2001

Links
- Website: mirchi.in

Radio Mirchi ("Mirchi" in Hindi meaning red chilli), also known as 98.3 Mirchi, is a nationwide network of private FM radio stations in India. It is owned by the Entertainment Network India Ltd (ENIL), which is one of the subsidiaries of The Times Group. The tagline of Radio Mirchi is "Mirchi Sunnewaale Always Khush!" ("Mirchi Listeners are Always Happy!"). It is the first privately owned radio station in India.

Radio Mirchi maintains weekly music charts, or record charts, for India. The most followed charts are Mirchi Top 20 (Bollywood Songs, now celebrities select their favourites) and Indie Pop 10 (Independent Music). Both of these charts rank recorded music according to popularity. These charts are published on a weekly basis in the Indian English-language daily newspaper, The Times of India, and on Radio Mirchi's official website.

Mirchi has its stations in India and also in GCC countries: UAE, Qatar, and Bahrain.

As per the latest IRS data released in 2017, Radio Mirchi has emerged as the number one FM broadcaster in Delhi and Mumbai, as well as in the top 8 metros taken together.

== History ==
The original avatar of Radio Mirchi was Times FM. Radio Mirchi began operations in 1993 in Indore, Madhya Pradesh. Until 1993, All India Radio or AIR, a government undertaking, was the only radio broadcaster in India. The government then took the initiative to privatize the radio broadcasting sector. It sold airtime blocks on its FM channels in Indore, Hyderabad, Mumbai, Delhi, Kolkata, Varanasi, Visakhapatnam and Goa to private operators, who developed their own program content. The Times Group operated its brand, Times FM, till June 1998. After that, the government decided not to renew contracts given to private operators.

=== First round of licenses ===
In 2000, the government announced the auction of 108 FM frequencies across India. ENIL won the largest number of frequencies, and thus started its operations under the brand name Radio Mirchi.

=== Second round of licences ===
In January 2006, Radio Mirchi purchased 25 frequencies in the second wave of licences that were issued by the Government of India. This pushes the Radio Mirchi presence in 32 centres. In the first wave of launches, Indore was the first city in India to have a grade of the first private radio channel. Times decided to start a radio channel to address the mass audience, as advertisers can be attracted by showing a low cost per thousand.

=== Third round of licenses ===
Radio Mirchi invested above Rs.339 crore during phase III auctions and purchased 17 new channels in new cities such as Chandigarh, Kochi, Kozhikode, Jammu, Srinagar, Guwahati and Shillong, as well as in existing cities such as Bangalore, Hyderabad, Ahmedabad, Pune, Kanpur, Lucknow, Jaipur, Nagpur and Surat. This pushes Radio Mirchi presence in 49 centres.

=== GCC countries expansion ===
Radio Mirchi started operations across UAE, streaming across three frequencies: 97.3FM in Abu Dhabi, 88.8FM in Dubai and the Northern Emirates and 95.6FM in Al Ain & Bahrain 104.2 and Qatar 89.6 Mirchi One In partnership with ONE FM Qatar ki dhadkan All the RJs have been recruited from various Radio Mirchi stations in India including Anup Chugh, with a total seven who will take to the air. Radio Mirchi UAE is now KADAK FM but later, Radio Mirchi made a comeback to the UAE in 2021 with 102.4 FM Mirchi.

== Areas of operation ==
=== India ===
Currently, Radio Mirchi has a presence of a 76-station network operating in 63 cities, along with online and international stations; the company boasts of a 112-station network.

- Ahmedabad, GJ
- Akola, MH (broadcast on 95.0 MHz)
- Amravati, MH (broadcast on 92.1 MHz)
- Amritsar, PB (broadcast on 104.8 MHz)
- Asansol, WB (broadcast on 95.0 MHz)
- Aurangabad, MH
- Bharuch, GJ (broadcast on 92.3 MHz)
- Bengaluru, KA (two channels - 98.3 and 95 MHz)
- Bhavnagar, GJ (broadcast on 91.5 MHz)
- Bhopal, MP
- Chandigarh
- Chennai, TN
- Coimbatore, TN
- Delhi
- Durg-Bhilai Nagar, CG (broadcast on 91.9 MHz)
- Guwahati, AS (broadcast on 95.0 MHz)
- Hubli-Dharwad, KA
- Hyderabad, TS (two channels - 98.3 and 95 MHz)
- Indore, MP (First city of Broadcasting)
- Jabalpur, MP
- Jaipur, RJ
- Jalandhar, PB
- Jamnagar, GJ (broadcast on 95.0 MHz)
- Jammu, JK
- Jodhpur, RJ (broadcast on 104.8 MHz)
- Jhansi, UP (broadcast on 104.8 MHz)
- Junagadh, GJ (broadcast on 95.0 MHz)
- Kanpur, UP
- Kochi, KL (broadcast on 104.0 MHz)
- Kolhapur, MH
- Kolkata, WB
- Kozhikode, KL (broadcast on 92.7 MHz)
- Lucknow, UP
- Madurai, TN
- Mangalore, KA
- Mehsana, GJ (broadcast on 91.9 MHz)
- Mumbai, MH
- Mysuru, KA (broadcast on 104.8 MHz)
- Nagpur, MH
- Nashik, MH
- Palanpur, GJ (broadcast on 93.7 MHz)
- Patiala, PB (broadcast on 104.8 MHz)
- Patna, BR
- Pondicherry, PY (broadcast on 104.0 MHz)
- Pune, MH (broadcast on 98.3 MHz)
- Raigarh, CG (broadcast on 91.1 MHz)
- Raipur, CG
- Rajahmundry, AP (broadcast on 91.1 MHz)
- Ranchi, JH
- Rajkot, GJ
- Shillong, ML (broadcast on 91.1 MHz)
- Shimla, HP (broadcast on 104.8 MHz)
- Siliguri, WB
- Srinagar, JK
- Surat, GJ
- Thiruvananthapuram, KL
- Tiruchirappalli, TN (broadcast on 95.0 MHz)
- Tirunelveli, TN (broadcast on 95.0 MHz)
- Ujjain, MP (broadcast on 91.9 MHz)
- Vadodara, GJ
- Varanasi, UP
- Vijayawada, AP
- Visakhapatnam, AP
- Warangal, TS (broadcast on 91.9 MHz)

Unless specified otherwise, all stations broadcast on 98.3 MHz

It reaches out to almost 52% of FM radio listeners in Delhi, 44% in Mumbai, 40% in Indore, 35% in Jaipur, 30% in Bhopal, 20% Chennai, 27% in Kolkata, 15% in Nagpur 60% in Mangaluru and 12% in Bengaluru. Radio Mirchi has started providing Visual Radio to its subscribers in Delhi from 25 July 2006 onwards and in Mumbai from September 2006. It has also started its Visual Radio service from Kolkata recently.

According to the Radio Audience Measurement Reports, Radio Mirchi has been dominating in Delhi and is the leader in Mumbai and Kolkata. However, in Kolkata, they are not clear leaders in the SEC ABC segments. The SEC ABC segments were earlier dominated by Big FM & now by Friends FM. However, in the SEC D & E segments, Radio Mirchi has total domination.

=== United Arab Emirates ===
Abu Dhabi Media owned and operated 4 radio stations under the Radio Mirchi brand, under a conditional license from ENIL. ADM rebranded to Kadak FM in July 2020. Radio Mirchi made a comeback in 2021 as MIRCHI 102.4 FM.

- Abu Dhabi (broadcast on 97.3 MHz)
- Al Ain (broadcast on 95.6 MHz)
- Dubai (broadcast on 102.4 FM)
- Sharjah (broadcast on 88.8 MHz)

=== United States ===
Stations are operated under a brand licensing agreement between ENIL and Arohi Media, with the latter managing and operating the stations. Radio Mirchi went live in the USA on 26 January 2019, as MIRCHI.

- New York tri-state region (broadcast on 1600 AM)
- Franklin Park, NJ (broadcast on 92.7 FM) and Princeton, NJ (broadcast on 103.3 FM HD2)
- Raleigh-Durham, NC (broadcast on 101.9 FM, 99.9 FM HD4, and 1490 AM)
- Philadelphia, PA (broadcast on 103.9 FM HD2)
- Cleveland, OH (broadcast on 93.1 FM HD2)
- Baltimore, MD (broadcast on 92.3 FM HD2)
- Columbus, OH (broadcast on 107.5 FM HD2)
- St. Louis, MO (broadcast on 95.5 FM HD2)

== Mirchi Music Awards ==
The Mirchi Music Awards are annually given awards instituted by Radio Mirchi for excellence in Bollywood film music. It was first given in 2008.
