= Motor Vehicle Insurance (India) =

Automobile Insurance in India

Motor Vehicle Insurance in India protects the motor vehicle owner against (a) the loss of or damage to the vehicle due to an insured risk, loss of use, theft, etc., and (b) indemnification if the vehicle owner is liable to any third party by law. Third-party insurance is a legal requirement. The vehicle's owner is legally responsible for any injury, danger, or damage to life or property of a third party caused or arising from the use of the vehicle in a public place. Driving without insurance in a public place is a punishable offence under the Motor Vehicles Act of 1988.

== The legal framework ==
The provisions of the following legal framework govern motor vehicle insurance in India. Important among these are:

- Motor Vehicles Act, 1988 (as amended up to 2019)
- Insurance Act, 1938 (as amended up to 2019)
- Indian Contract Act, 1872 (as amended up to 2018)
- Transfer of Property Act, 1882 (as amended up to 2019)
- Other Acts like the Road Goods Movement Act, Road Transport Corporations Act, etc.

The Motor Vehicles Act of 1988 mandates that every motor vehicle plying on the road is insured. Also, a copy/proof of the same should be kept in the vehicle. The Union Ministry of Road Transport and Highways said amendments have been brought in under Section 139 of the Central Motor Vehicle Act, 1989, so digital documents like driving licences and registration certificates are considered valid and at par with the original hard copy.

== Types of Motor Vehicle Insurance ==
Generally, there are two types of motor vehicle insurance policies.

- A document covering only the insurance liability for injury, property damage, death, etc., caused by the vehicle to a third party (commonly known as third-party liability or an Act liability insurance is a legal requirement).
- Motor Insurance Package Policy (which covers risks including damage to the owner's vehicle and the third-party liability) is popularly known as a Motor Comprehensive Policy.

One who buys the Act liability motor insurance should remember that the policy only covers statutory third-party liability and does not cover risks, including damage to the owner's vehicle. Therefore, purchasing a package insurance policy that provides comprehensive coverage, including coverage for your vehicle, would be prudent.

== Act liability insurance ==
A motor vehicle in a public place is potentially a dangerous and lethal instrument. Even when it is without its engine or petrol if it is moved down on an incline, even unintentionally, it can cause considerable damage and human injury; hence, unlike other properties which may be insured or not at the option of the owner, a motor vehicle is required by law to be insured in respect of the user's liability for death, bodily injury or damage to property of third party. These insurance contracts are based on indemnity and only cover the damage; the whole insurance amount is not given every time.

As sometimes the driver of the vehicle is often a person of small means and the injured person goes without adequate compensation, insurance of motor vehicle covering the third-party risk is made compulsory in India, and the Motor Vehicles Act provides that vehicle should not be used in a public place without having insurance policy covering third party risks. Third-party risk means risk covered for bodily injury, death and damage of the property of third party. A third party is anyone except the owner or passenger in the private vehicle. So pillion riders of the motor cycle, passengers in private cars, jeeps, etc., are not third parties. However, passengers in public vehicle such as bus, contract carriage vehicle, taxi etc. are also third party and hence covered by third party or statutory policy.

The Act policy does not cover the occupants of private vehicles and pillion riders. However, they can be covered by paying additional premium. If an additional premium is not paid to cover the risk of occupants of private vehicles and pillion riders, the insurance company will not be liable to compensate such victims. However, Supreme court held that if the policy is a package/comprehensive, then the occupants of private vehicles and pillion riders are covered, even if such person's additional coverage premium is not paid.

== Comprehensive motor insurance coverage ==
A motor insurance certificate in India

A comprehensive motor insurance policy provides coverage for losses, including damage to the insured vehicles due to the following perils:

- Fire, Explosion, Spontaneous combustion, Lightning
- Burglary, Housebreaking, Theft
- Riot, Strike
- Earthquake
- Flood, Storm, Cyclone, Hurricane, Tempest, Inundation, Hailstorm, Frost
- Accidental external means
- Malicious Act
- Terrorism acts
- While travelling by Rail, Road, Inland waterways, Lift, Elevator, or Air
- Landslide, Rockslide

== General exclusions ==
According to the general exclusions clause in the motor insurance policies, a claim may be denied in the following circumstances.

- The driver does not have a valid licence
- Intoxicating liquor/drugs as a proximate cause
- An accident occurring beyond geographical limits
- Using the vehicle for illegal purposes
- Electrical/mechanical breakdown

=== Valid driving licence ===
The driver not having a valid licence is one of the general exclusions; it is useful to know some of the legalities related to driving licenses.

- No person shall drive a vehicle in any public place without an unexpired driver's licence authorizing him/her to drive a motor vehicle.
- No person under eighteen may drive a motor vehicle in a public place. But, as an exception, a person may drive in a public place after age sixteen with a turbine engine capacity not exceeding 50 cubic meters (cc) without gear.
- No person under twenty shall drive a transport vehicle in a public place.
- A driver's licence can be issued to any person subject to the prescribed age limit for the particular type of vehicle.
- Vehicle owners shall not permit others to drive vehicles in violation of driving licence rules.
- Holders of driving licences or learner's licenses should not allow anyone else to use them.
- No person shall be issued a learner's licence to drive a transport vehicle unless he has held a licence to drive a light motor vehicle for at least one year.

=== Vehicle types ===
The Motor Vehicles Act classifies vehicles into various types. Even driving licences are issued keeping in mind the nature and types of vehicles. Some of these are as follows:

- Omnibus (designed to carry more than six persons)
- Light motor vehicle (GVW not exceeding 7500 Kgs)
- Trailer (type of vehicle towed by a motor vehicle)
- Tractor
- Contract Carriage
- Heavy goods vehicle (over 12,000 kg)
- Heavy passenger motor vehicle
- Goods carriage
- Tourist vehicle
- Private Service Vehicle
- Medium goods vehicle
- Medium passenger motor vehicle
- Invalid Carriage
- Passenger bus
- Public service vehicle

It should also be remembered that the motor vehicle laws covering such a wide range of vehicles are carefully considered while determining the settlement of claims by the motor insurance companies.

== Motor Vehicles: Period of Insurance ==
Generally, a vehicle insurance policy is valid for one year. However, long-term third-party vehicle insurance has been made mandatory for two-wheelers and four-wheelers as per the Supreme Court order. While the long-term insurance policy is 3 years for four-wheelers, it is 5 years for two-wheelers. The following guidelines are issued to implement the Supreme Court guidelines via a circular issued to insurers under Section 14(2) of the Insurance Regulatory and Development Agency of India Act, 1999, effective September 1, 2018.

- Provide only three-year third-party vehicle insurance policies for new cars and five-year third-party vehicle insurance policies for new two-wheelers;
- At the time of the sale of insurance, the premium is to be received for the entire term (three years or five years), but it is calculated annually. That is, only the premium for the year will be counted as income, and the premium for the remaining years paid will be treated as deposit premium or advance premium;
- No third-party insurance can be cancelled by the insurer or the insured except for the following reasons:
  - Double insurance
  - The vehicle is no longer in use due to total loss or constructive total loss
  - The vehicle is sold and/or transferred

Further, about the comprehensive insurance policies, the circular states:-

Currently, a comprehensive insurance policy, an insurance package, covers risks, including damage to the owner's vehicle and liability (third-party insurance). After the introduction of long-term third-party motor insurance for new cars and new two-wheelers, the insured may be given the following two options:

- Long-term package insurance that provides both third-party vehicle insurance and coverage for perils, including damage to the owner's vehicle for three years or five years; Or
- Package insurance with a term of three or five years (as applicable) for third-party components and one year for perils, including damage to the owner's vehicle.

== Premium ==
It is necessary to renew the insurance policy by paying the insurance premium annually before the due date.

Insurance companies generally do not provide any grace period on the due date to pay insurance premiums. No insurer shall accept any risk in any insurance business in India until the premium due has been received or advanced in the manner prescribed under section 64VB of the Insurance Act, 1938.

If the insurance policy lapses without payment of the insurance premium within the due date, vehicle inspection is mandatory. Also, allowing a comprehensive insurance policy to lapse beyond 90 days may result in loss of accrued no-claim bonus benefits.

== Complaints and grievances ==
A Grievance is any communication expressing dissatisfaction with an action or inaction about the quality of service/deficiency in service of an insurance company and/or any intermediary or seeks remedial action. Every insurer must ensure a grievance redressal mechanism to provide excellent customer service, an important tool for business growth.

Under the Public Grievance Redressal Rules, the Governing Body of the Insurance Council (GBIC) established the Insurance Ombudsman in India on November 11, 1998. Following this, India's Insurance Regulatory and Development Authority enacted certain regulations. Accordingly, every insurer shall ensure that the following measures are taken:

- Ensure that the management team approves a grievance redressal policy document
- All complaints should be logged through the Integrated Grievance Management System (IGMS) portal of the authority
- Every insurer should have a Grievance Redressal Officer. His contact details must be provided in all communications with insurance carriers
- The insurer must adhere to the grievance redressal guidelines prescribed by the authority
- Regular reporting of all types of complaints and reconciliation of pending complaints is a day-to-day activity
- The type of complaint, intermediary involved, action taken, and root cause analysis should be presented to the policyholders' welfare committee at every meeting for discussion and guidance.

=== Insurance Ombudsman ===
There are Insurance Ombudsmen at various locations. Any person having a grievance against an Insurer, either himself or through his legal heirs, nominee or assignee, may make a written complaint to the Insurance Ombudsman.

Complaints should be made to the Insurance Ombudsman within whose territorial jurisdiction the insurer's office is located at the address in the insurance policy or the insurer's communication. The Insurance Ombudsman can be approached in the following situations.

1. Delay in settlement of claims beyond the time specified in the regulations made under the Insurance Regulatory and Development Agency of India Act, 1999.
2. Any dispute regarding the amount of insurance premium paid or payable under the insurance policy
3. Misrepresenting the terms and conditions of the document at any time in the insurance policy or insurance contract
4. Legal material interpretation of the insurance policy of the existence of a dispute about a claim
5. Complaints relating to service of documents against insurers and their agents and intermediaries
6. Issuance of insurance policy not following the proposal form submitted by the proposer.
7. Non-issue of insurance policy after receipt of insurance premium
8. Other insurance legal, regulatory/procedural issues

The Insurance Ombudsman will act as Mediator. And he:

- He will make a reasonable recommendation based on the facts of the dispute
- If you accept this as a complete and final solution
- The Insurance Ombudsman will issue a recommendation within 15 days to the insurance company to comply with the norms

==== The Award ====
If redress through referral is not effective, the Insurance Ombudsman will pass an award restraining the insurance company within 3 months of receiving all the requirements from the complainant. The insurer concerned shall comply with the judgment within 30 days of receipt and report the same to the Insurance Ombudsman. There is no appellate authority against the decision of the Insurance Ombudsman. The judgment is final and binding on the insurer.

== See also ==
- Vehicle insurance
