= MagicBricks =

Indian property buying and selling platform

MagicBricks Realty Services Limited
- Company Logo
- Company type: Private
- Industry: Real Estate
- Founded: 19 August 2013; 12 years ago
- Headquarters: Noida, India
- Area served: India
- Key people: Sudhir Pai (Managing Director & CEO)
- Owner: Times Internet
- Number of employees: 2,100+ (2024)
- Parent: The Times Group
- Website: www.magicbricks.com

Magicbricks is an online real estate portal for properties in India.

== History ==
Magicbricks with IIM Bangalore launched the Housing Sentiment Index. It was launched in 2013 and the last report generated was in 2014.

Magicbricks bought a majority stake in PropViz, a company that made property viewing technology.

In 2025, Magicbricks announced acquisition of ReadPro, an AI-powered CRM platform.

== See also ==
- Real estate
- Economy of India
- Housing in India
- Info Edge
