= TimesJobs.com =

Indian employment website

Timesjobs.com
- Website type: Job search engine
- Headquarters: Noida, Uttar Pradesh
- Owner: The Times Group
- Revenue: Banner ads, referral marketing
- Website: www.timesjobs.com
- Commercial: Yes
- Registration: Required
- Launched: 2004
- Current status: Active

TimesJobs.com is an Indian employment website operating in India and Middle East. It is owned and operated by The Times Group. It is one of three major job portals in India along with Naukri.com and Monster.com.
