= Real Estate (Regulation and Development) Act, 2016 =

Act of the Parliament of India

Parliament of India
- Long title: An Act to establish the Real Estate Regulatory Authority for regulation and promotion of the real estate sector and to ensure sale of plot, apartment of building, as the case may be, or sale of real estate project, in an efficient and transparent manner and to protect the interest of consumers in the real estate sector and to establish an adjudicating mechanism for speedy dispute redressal and also to establish the Appellate Tribunal to hear appeals from the decisions, directions or orders of the Real Estate Regulatory Authority and the adjudicating officer and for matters connected therewith or incidental thereto.
- Citation: No. 16 of 2016
- Passed by: Lok Sabha
- Passed: 15 March 2016
- Enacted: 25 March 2016
- Passed by: Rajya Sabha
- Passed: 10 March 2016
- Assented to: 25 March 2016
- Commenced: 1 May 2016 - 61 of 92 sections notified 1 May 2017 - Remaining 31 Sections notified

Legislative history

Initiating chamber: Lok Sabha
- Bill title: Real Estate (Regulation and Development) Bill, 2016
- Bill citation: XLVI-C of 2013
- Introduced by: Dr. Girija Vyas, Minister of Housing and Urban Poverty Alleviation
- Introduced: 14 August 2013
- Committee report: Standing Committee Report; Select Committee Report
- Status: In force

The Real Estate (Regulation and Development) Act, 2016 is an Act of the Parliament of India which seeks to protect home-buyers as well as help boost investments in the real estate industry. The Act establishes a Real Estate Regulatory Authority (RERA) in each state for regulation of the real estate sector and also acts as an adjudicating body for speedy dispute resolution. The bill was passed by the Rajya Sabha on 10 March 2016 and the Lok Sabha on 15 March 2016. The Act came into force on 1 May 2016 with 61 of 92 sections notified. The remaining provisions came into force on 1 May 2017. The Central and state governments were liable to notify the Rules under the Act within a statutory period of six months.

== History ==
The Real Estate Regulatory Authority (RERA) Bill was introduced in 2013. In December 2015, the Union Cabinet of India had approved 20 major amendments to the bill based on the recommendations of a Rajya Sabha committee that examined the bill. The Bill had been referred to a selection committee, which had given its report in July 2015. However, Congress, Left and AIADMK had expressed their reservations on the report through dissent notes. The Rajya Sabha approved the bill on 10 March 2016 and the Lok Sabha approved it on 15 March 2016.

Subsequently, by the powers vested by Section 1 of the RERA Act, the Ministry of Housing and Urban Poverty Alleviation vide Notification S.O. 1544(E) dated 26.04.2016 notified 61 Sections out of 92 Sections on 1 May of 2016 and vide Notification S.O. 1216(E) dated 19.04.2017 notified the remaining 31 Sections.

== Structure ==
The RERA Act 2016 has been divided into 10 Chapters, which is further categorised into 92 Sections.

The Act starts with the Preamble, provides title, extent and commencement, registration of real estate projects and real estate agents, functions and duties of promoter, rights and duties of allottees, about Real Estate Regulatory Authority, Central Advisory Council, Real Estate Appellate Tribunal, various offences, penalties, and adjudication, about finances, accounts, audits, and reports and other miscellaneous provisions.

Below is the outline of the Rera Act 2016 in tabular form-

The Real Estate (Regulation and Development) Act, 2016
Chapter No.	Title of the Chapter	Sections Covered
I	Preliminary	1 and 2
II	Registration of Real Estate Project and Real Estate Agents	3 to 10
III	Function and Duties of Promoter	11 to 18
IV	Rights and Duties of Allottees	19
V	The Real Estate Regulatory Authority	20 to 40
VI	Central Advisory Council	41 and 42
VII	The Real Estate Appellate Tribunal	43 to 58
VIII	Offences, Penalties and Adjudication	59 to 72
IX	Finance, Accounts, Audit and Reports	73 to 78
X	Miscellaneous	79 to 92

== Principal Provisions ==
=== Definition Clause ===
The definition clause under Section 2 of the Act enlists the meaning of multiple terms used throughout the Act. Below is a table enlisting crucial definitions:-

Important Terms under Section 2
Sub-Section	Title
(b)	Advertisement
(d)	Allottee
(e)	Apartment
(k)	Carpet Area
(n)	Common Areas
(za)	Interest
(zh)	Planning Area
(zk)	Promoter
(zl)	Prospectus
(zn)	Real Estate Project
(zq)	Sanctioned Plan
(zr)	Saving Clause

=== Registration of Real Estate Project and Real Estate Agents ===
The Act enlists the registration policy of a real estate project and real estate agent and related provision under Section 3.

Sub-section (1) of Section 3 of the Act makes it mandatory for all real estate projects to register with RERA for launching a project to provide greater transparency in project marketing and execution. For ongoing projects which have not received a completion certificate on the date of commencement of the Act, will have to seek registrations within 3 months.

Each State RERA must either approve or reject the application for registration within 30 days from the date of application submitted by the promoter. Upon successful registration, the promoter of the real estate project will be provided with a registration number, a login ID, and a password to fill up the essential details on the website of the State RERA.

If the promoter fails to register, he shall be liable to a penalty that may extend up to a penalty of 10% of the estimated project cost. Furthermore, if he does not comply with the orders, directions or decisions issued by the State RERA, he shall be punishable with imprisonment which may extend up to three years or with a fine which may extend up to a further 10% of the estimated cost of the project.

Real estate agents who facilitate the selling or purchase of properties must take prior registration. Such agents will be issued a single registration number for each State or Union Territory, which must be quoted by the agent in every sale facilitated by him. If a real estate agent fails to register or contravenes section 9 (registration of real estate agent) and section 10 (Functions and duties of a real estate agent), he shall be liable to a penalty of ₹10,000 payable every day during which such default continues. This penalty may cumulatively extend up to 5% of the cost of the plot, apartment or building, as the case may be, of the real estate project.

=== Establishment of Real Estate Regulatory Authority and Appellate Tribunal ===
The establishment under Section 20 and 43 of the Act will help to establish state-level Real Estate Regulatory Authorities to regulate transactions related to both residential and commercial projects and ensure their timely completion and handover. Appellate Tribunals will now be required to adjudicate cases in 60 days as against the earlier provision of 90 days and Regulatory Authorities to dispose of complaints in 60 days while no time-frame was indicated in the earlier Bill.

=== Offences, Penalties and Adjudication ===
Sections 59 to 72 of Chapter VIII of the Act provides the provisions regarding Offences, Penalties, and Adjudication.

==== Punishment for Non-Registration ====
Section 59, 60 and 62 of the Act provides the punishment to the promoters and the real estate agents for non-registration under RERA.

Below is a table describing the penalty and imprisonment-

Section	Sub-Section	Punishment receiver	Conditions for Punishment	Penalty	Imprisonment	Punishment Clubbing
59	(1)	Promoter	If promoter contravenes Section 3	The amount may extend up to 10% of the estimated cost of the real estate project.	NIL	Only fine
	(2)		If promoter not follows the order, decisions or directions issued under sub-section (1)	Amount as stated under sub-section (1) + amount which may further extend up to 10% of the estimated cost of the real estate project.	The term of imprisonment may extend up to 3 years.	Either fine or imprisonment or both.
60	NA	Promoter	If Promoter provides false information under section 4.	The amount may extend up to 10% of the estimated cost of the real estate project.	NA	Only fine
62	NA	Real Estate Agent	If any real estate agent fails to comply with Section 9 and 10 of the Act.	Amount of ₹ 10000 every day during which such default continues. It may extend up to 5% of the estimated cost of the real estate project.	NA	Only fine

==== Punishment for non-compliance of orders, decisions or directions ====
Section	Punishment Receiver	Non-Compliance of Order given by	Penalty	Imprisonment	Punishment Clubbing
63	Promoter	Real Estate Regulatory Authority	Penalty for every day during which such default continues and may extend up to 5% of the estimated cost of the real estate project.	NA	Only fine
64	Promoter	Real Estate Appellate Tribunal	Penalty for every day during which such default continues and may extend up to 10% of the estimated cost of the real estate project.	Term of imprisonment may extend up to 3 years	Either fine or imprisonment or both
65	Real Estate Agent	Real Estate Regulatory Authority	Penalty for every day during which such default continues and may extend up to 5% of the estimated cost of the real estate project.	NA	Only fine
66	Real Estate Agent	Real Estate Appellate Tribunal	Penalty for every day during which such default continues and may extend up to 10% of the estimated cost of the real estate project.	Term of imprisonment may extend up to 1 year	Either fine or imprisonment or both
67	Allottee	Real Estate Regulatory Authority	Penalty for every day during which such default continues and may extend up to 5% of the estimated cost of the real estate project.	NA	Only fine
68	Allottee	Real Estate Appellate Tribunal	Penalty for every day during which such default continues and may extend up to 10% of the estimated cost of the real estate project.	Term of imprisonment may extend up to 1 year	Either fine or imprisonment or both

=== Protection of Homebuyers ===
The Act prohibits unaccounted money from being pumped into the sector, and as of now 70% of the money has to be deposited in bank accounts through cheques compulsorily. A major benefit for consumers included in the Act is that builders will have to quote prices based on carpet area and not on super built-up area. The Act states that the carpet area include usable spaces like kitchen and toilets. Under RERA, its mandatory for the builders to disclose the carpet area. RERA possesses the authority to intervene and safeguard the interests of homebuyers, even in cases where a bank is enforcing its security interest under the SARFAESI Act.

== State Regulations under RERA ==
Section 84 of the Act provides that within six months of the Act being enforced, each State Government shall make rules for carrying out the provisions of the Act. The said Rules are to be notified by the State Government. As late as 31 October 2016, Central Government, released the Real Estate (Regulation and Development) (General) Rules, 2016, vide Notification by the Ministry of Housing & Urban Poverty Alleviation (HUPA). The Rules so issued by the Central Government are applicable to the five Union Territories without Legislature viz., Andaman & Nicobar Islands, Dadra & Nagar Haveli, Daman & Diu, Lakshadweep, and Chandigarh. The Rules have been issued after the prior release of Draft for comments.

As of 13 July 2019, Arunachal Pradesh, Meghalaya, Sikkim and Nagaland have not notified the Rules. In the case of five north-eastern states, the RERA Act is facing certain constitutional challenges as the land in those states are community owned. West Bengal notified a similar law called the West Bengal Housing Industry Regulatory Act, 2017, which came into effect from 1 June 2018. However, as of July 2019, many states have not implemented the law and failed to notify a Permanent Regulator, Appellate Authority or a website. A chart showing the implementation status by different states as of July 2019 can be seen here.

RERA Act 2016 - Implementation Report (As of 13.07.2019)
S.No.	State/UT	General Rules	Date of notification	Rules	RERA Website Link
1	Andaman and Nicobar Islands	Notified	31 October 2016		http://www.tnrera.in/
2	Andhra Pradesh	Notified	28 March 2017		https://www.rera.ap.gov.in
3	Arunachal Pradesh	Not Notified	NA	NA	NA
4	Assam	Notified	6 May 2017		
5	Bihar	Notified	1 May 2017		https://rera.bihar.gov.in/
6	Chandigarh	Notified	31 October 2016		http://rera.chbonline.in
7	Chhattisgarh	Notified	26 April 2017		https://rera.cgstate.gov.in/%5B%5D
8	Dadra and Nagar Haveli	Notified	31 October 2016		http://maharera.mahaonline.gov.in/
9	Daman and Diu	Notified	31 October 2016		http://maharera.mahaonline.gov.in/
10	Delhi	Notified	24 November 2016		http://dda.org.in/rera/index.aspx
11	Goa	Notified	24 November 2017		https://rera.goa.gov.in/
12	Gujarat	Notified	29 October 2016		http://gujrera.gujarat.gov.in/
13	Haryana	Notified	27 July 2017		http://www.haryanarera.gov.in/
14	Himachal Pradesh	Notified	28 September 2017		http://www.hprera.in/
15	Jammu and Kashmir	Not Applicable	NA	NA	NA
16	Jharkhand	Notified	18 May 2017		https://jharera.jharkhand.gov.in/
17	Karnataka	Notified	10 July 2017		https://rera.karnataka.gov.in/
18	Kerala	Notified	18 June 2018		https://rera.kerala.gov.in/
19	Lakshadweep	Notified	31 October 2016		
20	Madhya Pradesh	Notified	22 October 2016	Rules	http://rera.mp.gov.in/
21	Maharashtra	Notified	19 April 2017		https://maharera.mahaonline.gov.in/
22	Manipur	Notified	NA	NA	NA
23	Meghalaya	Not Notified	NA	NA	NA
24	Mizoram	Notified	15 March 2019		http://udpamizoram.nic.in/RERA.HTML
25	Nagaland	Not Notified	NA	NA	NA
26	Odisha	Notified	25 February 2017		https://rera.odisha.gov.in/
27	Puducherry	Notified	18 July 2017		
28	Punjab	Notified	8 June 2017		https://www.rera.punjab.gov.in/
29	Rajasthan	Notified	1 May 2017		http://rera.rajasthan.gov.in/
30	Sikkim	Not Notified	NA	NA	NA
31	Tamil Nadu	Notified	22 June 2017	NA	https://rera.tn.gov.in
32	Telangana	Notified	4 August 2017		https://www.tgrera.com/
33	Tripura	Notified	27 October 2017		https://udd.tripura.gov.in/acsnrules
34	Uttar Pradesh	Notified	11 October 2016		www.up-rera.in
35	Uttarakhand	Notified	28 April 2017		http://uhuda.org.in/?page_id=1354
36	West Bengal	Notified	NA	NA	https://rera.wb.gov.in/
