= Gaana (music streaming service) =

Indian commercial music streaming service

- Gaana's Android app
- Developer: Entertainment Network India Limited (ENIL)
- Launched: April 2010; 16 years ago
- Platforms: Web browser; Windows; Android; macOS; iOS
- Members: ▲150 million (2019)
- Pricing model: Premium version: ₹99 (US$1.00) per month
- Availability: India limited worldwide
- Website: gaana.com

Gaana is an Indian subscription-based commercial music streaming service. It was launched in April 2010 and is currently owned by ENIL. It offers both Indian and international music content. Its entire Indian music catalog was available to users worldwide until 2023, when access to the music library was restricted based on geolocation of subscribers. Gaana features music from 21 Indian languages including the major languages such as Assamese, Bengali, Bhojpuri, English, Gujarati, Hindi, Kannada, Urdu, Odia, Marathi, Punjabi, Tamil, Telugu, Maithili, Malayalam and other Indian regional languages.

Gaana allows users to make their playlists public so that they can be seen by other users. They can view and favorite playlists. Its mobile app was launched for Android, iOS and Windows. Gaana is priced at ₹99 (US$1.00) per month (within India) and not available outside India. Gaana became a subscription-only service in 2022 after failing to secure fresh funds or find a buyer. In 2023, it was acquired by ENIL in a slump sale.

== History ==
The domain name, Gaana.com, was first registered on 21 June 2005 and was launched in April 2010.

Gaana.com formed a partnership in February 2013 with South Indian Music Companies Association to acquire rights to music from 79 different labels. Consequently, Gaana.com had access to more than 45+ million songs. Gaana generated an annual revenue of US$5 million for Times Internet.

Micromax bought a stake in Gaana.com in October 2015. In February 2018, Tencent also backed the company with an investment of $115 million.

In May 2015, Gaana launched gaming innovation in their music streaming app. The music app has also introduced voice assistant feature.

On 8 July 2020, Gaana debuted a short video platform called HotShots after the Government of India banned Bytedance-owned TikTok.

Ganna was acquired by Entertainment Network India Limited (ENIL) for ₹25 lakh (about US$30,000).

In December 2024, Mahindra & Mahindra partnered with Gaana to provide integrated in-car audio streaming for its upcoming Mahindra electric SUVs, the BE.06 and XUV.e9.
