= NDTV Arabia =

TV news channel

- Country: Middle East
- Headquarters: New Delhi

Ownership
- Owner: NDTV
- Sister channels: NDTV India; NDTV Profit; NDTV 24x7

History
- Launched: 2007
- Closed: 2009

NDTV Arabia was a premier English language news channel that was owned by New Delhi Television Ltd. NDTV Arabia was the localized version of NDTV 24x7. It won the Asian Television Award for Best News Channel in 2007. The channel has ceased operations since the middle of June 2009 due to financial crisis.

NDTV Arabia targeted the Indian expatriates living in the Middle East and broadcast most of the programs from its sister channel NDTV 24x7. However, there were differences in the schedule.

== See also ==
- NDTV 24x7
- NDTV India
- NDTV Profit
