= NDTV Prime =

- Country: India
- Broadcast area: India
- Headquarters: New Delhi, Mumbai

Programming
- Language(s): English
- Picture format: 4:3 (576i, SDTV)

Ownership
- Owner: NDTV
- Sister channels: NDTV 24x7 NDTV India; NDTV Good Times

History
- Launched: 5 June 2017; 7 years ago
- Replaced: NDTV Profit
- Closed: 2020; 5 years ago

Links
- Website: Official website

NDTV Prime was an Indian information and entertainment channel owned by NDTV. It was launched on 5 June 2017. Prior to the launch, NDTV transferred their business from profit to regular business and finance segments on NDTV 24x7.

NDTV Prime was available 24 hours a day, offering information and entertainment programs that include topics like gadgets, automobiles, education, careers, property, entertainment, art, and comedy.

In mid-2020, NDTV Prime was replaced by NDTV Profit and some programs formerly broadcast on prime are now broadcast on NDTV Profit after market hours, and at weekends.
