= Brinda Karat =

Indian politician (born 1947)

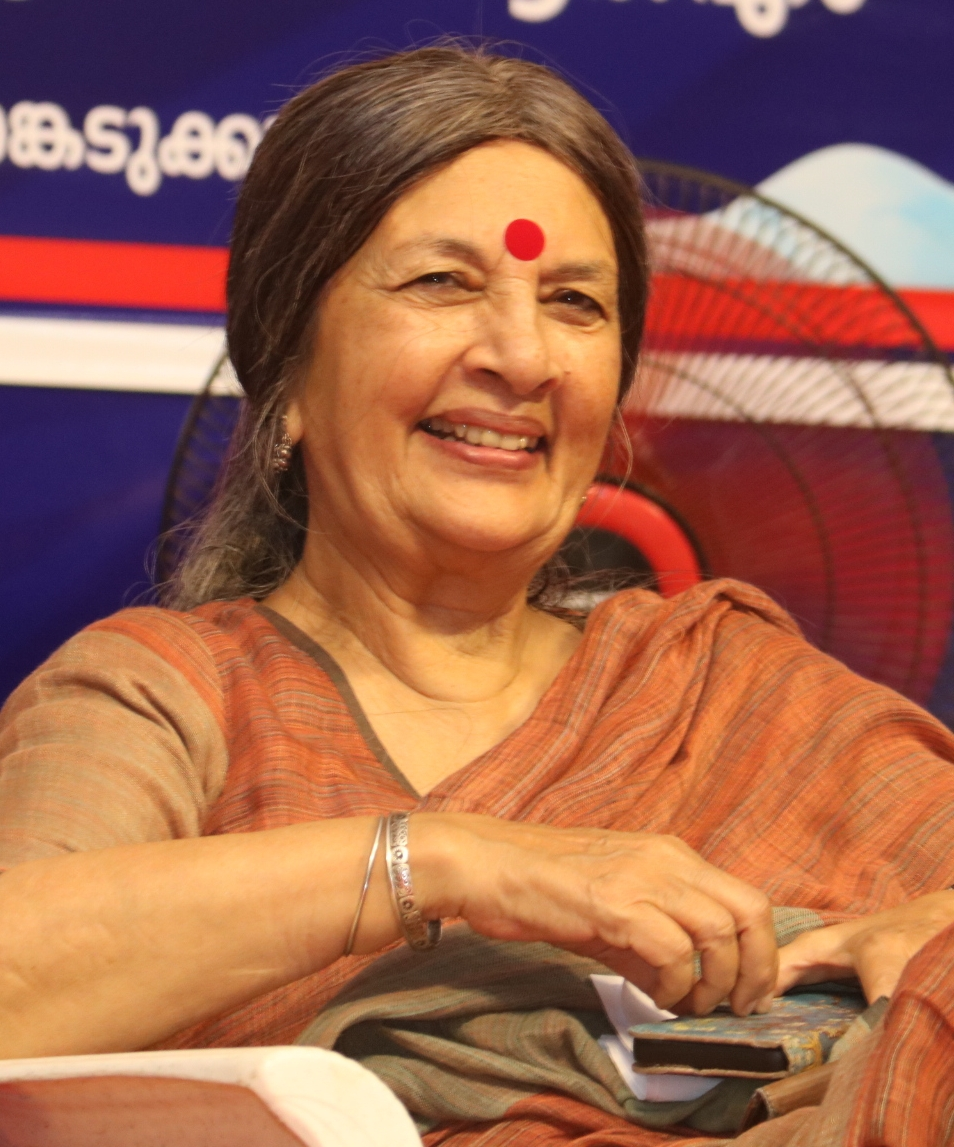

Member of the Politburo of the Communist Party of India (Marxist)
- In office 2005 — 6 April 2025

Member of Parliament, Rajya Sabha
- In office 2005 - 2011
- Constituency: West Bengal

Personal details
- Born: Brinda Das; 16 October 1947 (age 79) Calcutta, West Bengal, India
- Party: Communist Party of India (Marxist)
- Spouse: Prakash Karat (m. 1975)
- Relations: Radhika Roy (sister); Prannoy Roy (brother-in-law); Vijay Prashad (nephew)

Brinda Karat (née Das; born 16 October 1947) is an Indian Marxist politician and former member of Rajya Sabha for West Bengal, serving as a Communist Party of India (Marxist) representative from 11 April 2005 to 2011.

In 2005, she became the first woman to serve as a member of the CPI(M) Politburo. She has also been the general secretary of the All India Democratic Women's Association (AIDWA) from 1993 to 2004 and thereafter its vice-president.

== Early life and education ==
Karat was born on 16 October 1947 in Calcutta, West Bengal, India to Oshrukona Mitra, and Suraj Lal Das. Her mother was Bengali, and her father was a Punjabi refugee from Lahore in the newly created Pakistan. Theirs was an inter-community marriage fraught with familial opposition; Mitra’s father’s brother imposed a social ban on attending the wedding. In response, she approached her mother’s family, and finally the ceremony took place at Indian nationalist Subodh Chandra Mallik’s home.

Karat grew up with 4 siblings—one elder brother, one elder sister and one younger sister. Her father raised them in a “liberal and secular” household. “We had no barriers or brakes on [the] kind of friends we can have or kind of activities we were into,” she recalled in a 2005 interview, “We had tremendous amount of freedom. There was no personal battle I had to fight in this regard”.

Karat's mother died when she was 5. Until 12 or 13, she remained in Calcutta and studied at Loreto House under Irish nuns. Later, she enrolled in the Welham Girls’ School in Dehradun, where she demonstrated strong athletic skills that helped her secure admission into New Delhi’s Miranda House at 16. At the time, she did not consider herself “politically motivated” although she expressed interest in drama, theatre and debates. She credits her then college professor Devaki Jain, the feminist economist, for influencing her thinking.

== Political career ==
In 1967, after graduation from Miranda House, she left for London, where she worked with Air India at Bond Street for four years. While working for Air India, she campaigned against the mandatory wearing of skirts in the airlines rather than the saree. The Air India headquarters finally agreed with her and ever since then women working for the airline in London can exercise a choice of whether to wear a saree or a skirt as their uniform.

At the same time, anti-war movements across Europe and the Atlantic were on the rise to protest the intervention of the United States in Vietnam. For Karat, this was the turning point; “There was a whole range of questions,” she mentioned in 2005, “Why should a poor country like Vietnam be attacked by a big power like America? Why should young people go to war? What were the reasons for war? These questions are even relevant today. At that time you could not be young without questioning the Vietnam War.” Consequently, She was associated with a few Indian student groups, but no institution in particular. She familiarised herself with Marxist literature, and began ideating ways to “bring back home that awareness in the Indian context.”

In 1971, she decided to leave her job and return to Calcutta. She started her political work as a student activist since under the guidance of the Party she enrolled as a student in Calcutta University. Initially she worked with students in the college campus and later during the Bangladesh war at refugee camps in the State. She was also writing for the Party weekly and later became a full-time worker there. In 1975, she shifted to Delhi "In 1975 I shifted to Delhi because I wanted to work in the trade unions. At that time our party general secretary was Comrade P. Sundaraiah. He was ahead of his time. He had a clear perspective of the area of work to assign workers. He had a sensitive cadre policy. I was privileged to join the party in Delhi when he was the leader. I was accepted and got my membership."

On 7 November 1975, she married Prakash Karat. The same year she started working as a trade union organiser with textile mill workers in North Delhi. She grew to be active with worker's movements and the Indian women's movements. She gained prominence in the campaign for reform of rape laws in the 1980s. Karat is a prominent campaigner for gender issues and has fought within the party for adequate representation for women in its leadership. On 11 April 2005, she was elected to the Indian Parliament, Rajya Sabha as a CPI(M) member for West Bengal. In 2005, she was also elected to the Politburo of the Communist Party of India (Marxist), the highest decision-making body of the party and Brinda Karat is its first woman member.

== Family ==
She is married to Prakash Karat on 7 November 1975, a Keralite by origin and a prominent CPI(M) leader. Her sister Radhika Roy is married to Prannoy Roy, founder and CEO of NDTV. In 2005, she participated in Amu, a film made by her niece, Shonali Bose, on the Anti-Sikh riots in 1984. She is an aunt of the historian Vijay Prashad.

== Literary works ==
Brinda is the author of Survival and Emancipation: Notes from Indian Women's Struggles, a work addressing the challenges faced by women's movements in India from a left perspective, and of An Education for Rita: A Memoir, 1975-1985 over her life and struggle under the name of Rita.

== Bibliography ==
- Brinda Karat, Survival and Emancipation: Notes from Indian Women's Struggles. New Delhi, Three Essays Collective, 2005. ISBN 81-88789-37-2.
- Brinda Karat, An Education for Rita: A Memoir, 1975-1985. New Delhi, LeftWord Books, 2024. ISBN 978-9392018213.
- Brinda Karat, Hindutva and Violence against Women. New Delhi, Speaking Tiger Books LLP, 2024. ISBN 978-93-5447-811-6.
