= Ramdev labour law and medicine mislabelling controversy =

Ramdev is yoga guru in India. A manufacturing unit owned by his yoga trust was accused of violating labour law and medicine mislabelling. The controversy lasted from mid-2005 to March 2006, when the state government of Uttaranchal dropped charges against Ramdev.

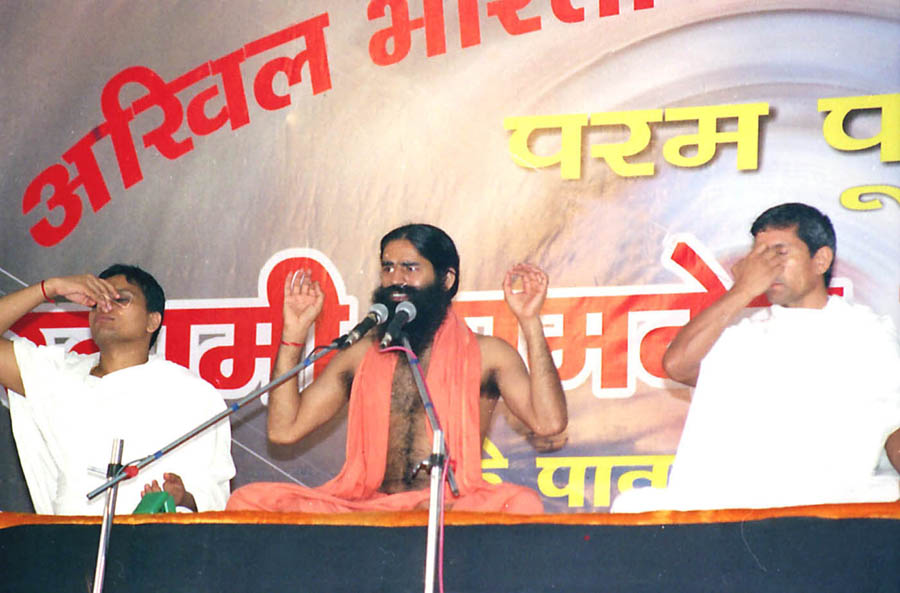
Ramdev in 2004

== History ==
In April 2005, Divya Yog Pharmacy manufacturing plant in Haridwar, owned by Ramdev, dismissed 115 workers. The workers had been protesting demanding better wages and insurance. Centre of Indian Trade Unions, a trade union associated with the CPI(M), got involved in it on behalf of the workers. On 21 May 2005, a tripartite agreement was signed between the workers, the plant and the district administration. However, the plant did not honour the agreement and implicated several workers in exaggerated police cases.

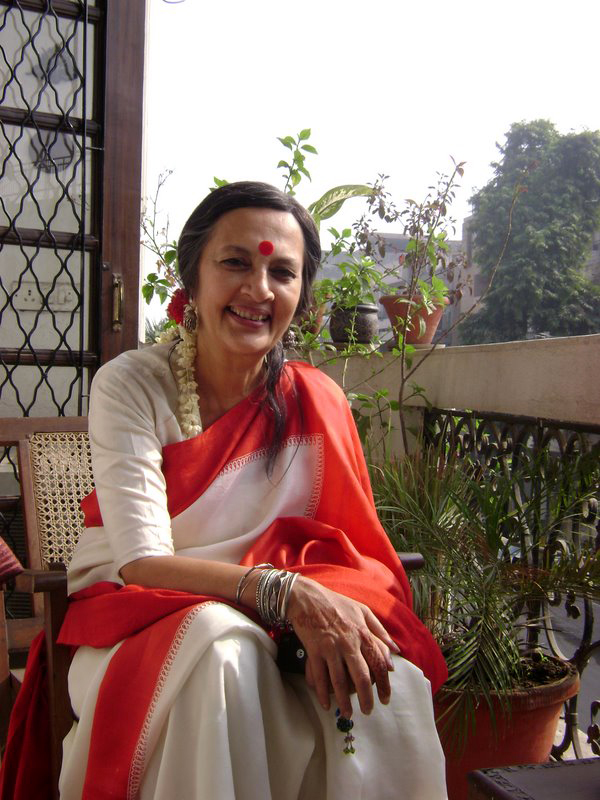
Brinda Karat in 2009

Also in May 2005, Brinda Karat, a CPI(M) leader, visited the site to show solidarity with the workers. She was informed by the agitating workers that human skull and animal parts were allegedly being used by the pharmacy. Karat demanded an investigation. They denied the allegations and said that only sea shells and herbs were used in the preparations. On 22 May 2005, workers began protesting outside the house of district magistrate R.K. Sudhanshu, who had the authority to enforce the agreement.

In June 2005, Karat organised protests in Haridwar and Dehra Dun on behalf the dismissed workers. She also met with then Uttaranchal Health Secretary S. K. Dass and demanded that the pharmacy be brought under the Indian labour law as was mass-producing medicines for sale, and the workers be adequately compensated for their labour. In July 2005, the workers began writing letters to various state officials claiming that crushed human skulls were being used in a preparation (Kuliya Bhasm) intended for epilepsy and testicles of the Indian otter was being used a preparation (Yauvanamrit Bati) intended for treatment for sexual weakness.

Earlier in May, the workers had obtained samples of the two preparations from the yoga trust's hospital, Brahmakalp Chikitsalay, in Haridwar, along with payment receipts. There were handed over to Principal Secretary (Health) of Uttarachal, Sujit Das, who recommended that in the central government agencies as the state didn't have facilities to test them. The Union Health Ministry passed the samples to Department of Ayurveda, Yoga and Naturopathy, Unani, Siddha and Homoeopathy (AYUSH). AYUSH found evidence of human and animal DNA in the samples. The final report said that Ayurveda allowed usage to those materials, but the pharmacy was in violation of licensing and labelling laws under Indian Drugs and Cosmetics Act, 1940.

On 3 January 2006, Brinda Karat, backed by a letter from Shiv Basant, Joint Secretary in the Health Ministry, accused Ramadev of adulteration and labelling violations. Ramadev held a press conference in response and denied the allegations. He claimed that no government agency had approached the pharmacy for tests and that Karat was siding with drug MNCs to defame his firm. He also alleged that the samples may have been tampered with. On 5 January, supporter of Ramdev tried to barge into the CPI(M) office and clashed with the police who tried to stop them. Then Health Minister, Anbumani Ramadoss, said that samples provided by Karat contained human parts but further tests were being conducted. However, many newspapers carried information to the contrary. On 7 January, Karat said that her campaign was about labour laws and consumer rights, she was not against yoga or Ayurveda.

In January 2006, several politicians expressed support for Ramdev, among them were Sharad Pawar, Lalu Prasad Yadav, Mulayam Singh Yadav, Ram Madhav, Prakash Javdekar and Subhas Chakraborty. A Uttaranchal Minister Dhirendra Pratap accused Karat of foul play and demanded an apology.

On 22 February 2006, the Health Minister Anbumani Ramadoss clarified to the Lok Sabha one of the tests had confirmed human DNA. However other labs had failed to detected the same. He said that a report had been sent to the Uttaranchal government for further investigation.

In March 2006, the Uttarakhand government cleared Ramdev of the animal parts in medicine charges. Afterwards, also in March, Karat received a legal notice from B. D. Sethi, a BJP leader from Faridabad, for causing religious disturbances in the country and hurting the religious feelings of pure vegetarians.
