= Prannoy =

Prannoy is an Indian masculine given name. Notable people with the name include:

- Prannoy Kumar (born 1992), Indian badminton player
- Prannoy Roy (born 1949), Indian journalist and media personality
