= Paresh Lal Roy =

Indian boxer

Paresh Lal Roy পরেশলাল রায়
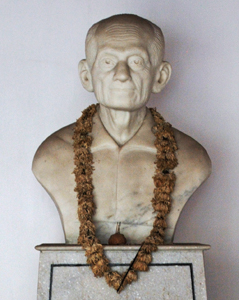
- Statue of P L Roy
- Born: 20 December 1893; Barisal, Bengal Presidency, British India
- Died: 30 December 1979 (aged 86); Kolkata, West Bengal, India
- Known for: Organizing and popularizing boxing in India
- Parent: Peary Lal Roy
- Relatives: Prannoy Roy (grandson)

Paresh Lal Roy (Bengali: পরেশলাল রায়) (20 December 1893 – 30 December 1979) was an Indian amateur boxer, credited with popularising the sport among Indians. He is known as the Father of Indian Boxing.

Among his descendants include: his granddaughter, Indian journalist and writer, Arundhati Roy and his grandson, the Indian journalist and founder of the NDTV television network, Prannoy Roy.

== Early life ==
Roy came from the landlord family of Lakhutia in Barisal district. He was born on 20 December 1893, he was the third of six children of Peary Lal Roy and Lolita Roy in a Bengali Christian family. Indra Lal Roy was his younger brother. Roy came from a family of highly qualified and established persons. His father was a barrister and his maternal grandfather Dr. Soorjo Coomar Goodeve Chuckerbutty was one of the first Indian doctors to be trained in Western medicine.

Roy received his education in England. He attended the St. Paul's School in London. At the age of ten he began training in boxing under Billy Childs, the then boxing coach at Cambridge who later became the featherweight world champion. Jim Driscoll himself took the responsibility of training Roy. Roy became the school champion. He passed in B.A. from Cambridge University. At Cambridge won the university championship from Oxbridge and became an Oxford Blue. Roy was the first Cambridge Blue from Asia.

In 1914, Roy became the bantamweight champion in England. Apart from boxing Roy was also proficient in shooting and horse riding. He was the first amateur Indian jockey to have ridden a horse in a race. At the outbreak of the First World War, he became a private in the Royal Artillery while his younger brother Indra Lal Roy obtained the King's Commission to the Royal Flying Corps. In the army he rose to be a lieutenant. After the war he completed in Masters in Economics from Cambridge University in 1919 and returned to India.

== Career ==
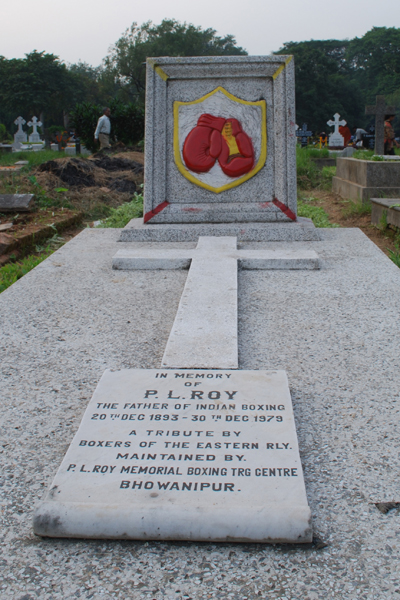
Grave of P L Roy, Bhawanipur Cemetery, Kolkata

He joined the Bengal Railway as a traffic superintendent. In the 1920s, the sport of boxing was popular mainly among the Anglo-Indians. In order to organize boxing as a sport and make it popular among the Indians, Roy opened a boxing training centre in Ballygunge. In 1928, he took initiative to organize the first inter-Railway Boxing Championship at Kolkata. In the same year he founded the Bengal Boxing Federation and became its secretary. Later he became its president. In 1933, in the competition between the military and the civilians, Santosh De, a student of Roy became the champion. Among the notable students of Roy were Pramatha Chaudhuri, Phanindra Krishna Mitra, Nagen Chatterjee, Joaquim C. A. Minus, Abulal, Johnny Natal, R. Austin, D. Gasper, Kartik Dutta etc.

Though Roy himself was an amateur boxer, he fought against Edgar Bright, the then Indian champion in bantamweight division at the Old Empire Theatre and defeated him. He also defeated Philippine boxer Young Turley once.

== Honor ==
In 2011 the Indian Railway immortalised Paresh Lal Roy by unveiling a marble bust of the boxer in an indoor stadium named after him. The P L Roy Indoor Stadium is located in Sealdah. The statue was unveiled by A K Gupta, additional general manager Eastern Railway and President Eastern Railway Sports Association.
