= Indra Lal Roy =

Indian World War I flying ace (1898–1918)

- ইন্দ্রলাল রায়
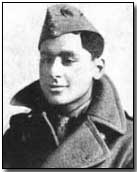
- Roy in his Royal Flying Corps uniform
- Born: 2 December 1898; Calcutta, British India
- Died: 22 July 1918 (aged 19); Carvin, France
- Burial place: Estevelles Communal Cemetery, Pas-de-Calais, France; 50°28′32″N 2°54′02″E
- Relatives: Paresh Lal Roy (brother); Lolita Roy (mother); Subroto Mukherjee (nephew)
- Military career
- Allegiance: United Kingdom British India
- Branch: Royal Air Force; Royal Flying Corps
- Service years: 1917–1918
- Rank: Lieutenant
- Nickname: "Laddie"
- Units: No. 56 Squadron RFC; No. 40 Squadron RAF
- Conflicts: World War I; Western Front †
- Awards: Distinguished Flying Cross

Indra Lal Roy DFC (Bengali: ইন্দ্রলাল রায়; 2 December 1898 – 22 July 1918) was the sole Indian World War I flying ace. While serving in the Royal Flying Corps and its successor, the Royal Air Force, he claimed ten aerial victories; five aircraft destroyed (one shared), and five 'down out of control' (one shared) in just over 170 hours flying time, making him the first Indian flying ace.

== Family background ==
The second son of Piera Lal Roy and Lolita Roy, he was born in Calcutta, where his father was a barrister and Director of Public Prosecutions. He was nicknamed "Laddie". Roy came from a distinguished family. The Roy family is a Bengali kayastha family originally from the Barisal district in present-day Bangladesh. Prior to India's partition, the Roy family was a prominent Zamindar family of East Bengal. The Roy family estate is known as Lakhutia (note: there are several variations of the spelling of this word, including ‘Lakutia’ and ‘Lakhotia’). The Lakhutia Zamindar estate was founded by Roop Chandra Roy in the late 17th century. His older brother, Paresh Lal Roy (1893–1979), served in the 1st Battalion, Honourable Artillery Company, and later became known as the "father of Indian boxing." His maternal grandfather, Dr. Soorjo Coomar Goodeve Chuckerbutty, was one of the first Indian doctors to be trained in Western medicine. His nephew, Subroto Mukerjee (1911–1960), served as a fighter pilot in World War II, and later became the first Indian Chief of Air Staff of the Indian Air Force.

== First World War ==
When the First World War broke out, Roy was attending St Paul's School, Hammersmith in London, England. Initially rejected by the Royal Flying Corps on the grounds of poor eyesight, Roy paid for a second opinion from a leading eye specialist, and the decision was overturned. Five months after turning 18, on 4 April 1917 he joined the RFC, and was commissioned as a second lieutenant on 5 July. After training and gunnery practice at Vendôme and Turnberry, he joined No. 56 Squadron on 30 October. Roy was part of "A" Flight, commanded by Captain Richard Maybery.

On 6 December, Roy was injured and knocked unconscious after he crash-landed his S.E.5a fighter. Thought to be dead, he woke up in a French morgue. While recovering, Roy made numerous sketches of aircraft — many of which survive. In May he returned to duty as an equipment officer and within a few weeks was passed as medically fit to fly. He was transferred to Captain George McElroy's flight in No. 40 Squadron in June 1918.

On his return to active service, Roy achieved ten victories (two shared) in thirteen days. His first was a Hannover over Drocourt on 6 July. This was followed by three victories in the space of four hours on 8 July (two Hannover Cs and a Fokker D.VII); two on 13 July (a Hannover C and a Pfalz D.III); two on 15 July (two Fokker D.VIIs); and one on 18 July (a DFW C.V). Roy's final victory came the following day when he shot down a Hannover C over Cagnicourt. He is believed to be the first and only Indian flying ace of the First World War.

Roy was killed over Carvin on 22 July 1918 in a dog fight against the Fokker D.VIIs of Jagdstaffel 29. He is buried at Estevelles Communal Cemetery, Pas-de-Calais, France.

Roy is featured in the Ministry of Defence publication "We were there" about the contribution of ethnic minorities who have fought for Great Britain for two hundred years. The brochure was based on an exhibition with the same title.

=== List of aerial victories ===
Combat record
| No. | Date/Time | Aircraft/ Serial No. | Opponent | Result | Location | Notes |
|---|---|---|---|---|---|---|
| 1 | 6 July 1918 @ 0545 | S.E.5a (B180) | Hannover C | Out of control | Drocourt | |
| 2 | 8 July 1918 @ 0645 | S.E.5a (B180) | Hannover C | Out of control | Drocourt | |
| 3 | 8 July 1918 @ 0925 | S.E.5a (B180) | Hannover C | Out of control | East of Monchy | Shared with Captain George McElroy and Lieutenant Gilbert Strange. |
| 4 | 8 July 1918 @ 1025 | S.E.5a (B180) | Fokker D.VII | Out of control | South-east of Douai | |
| 5 | 13 July 1918 @ 0645 | S.E.5a (B180) | Hannover C | Destroyed | West of Estaires | Shared with Captain George McElroy, and Lieutenants Gilbert Strange and F. H. Knobel. |
| 6 | 13 July 1918 @ 2005 | S.E.5a (B180) | Pfalz D.III | Destroyed | Vitry — Brebières | |
| 7 | 15 July 1918 @ 2005 | S.E.5a (B180) | Fokker D.VII | Destroyed | Hulloch | |
| 8 | 15 July 1918 @ 2005 | S.E.5a (B180) | Fokker D.VII | Out of control | Hulloch | |
| 9 | 18 July 1918 @ 2040 | S.E.5a (B180) | DFW C.V | Destroyed | South-east of Arras | |
| 10 | 19 July 1918 @ 1025 | S.E.5a (B180) | Hannover C | Destroyed | Cagnicourt | |

== Awards and honours ==
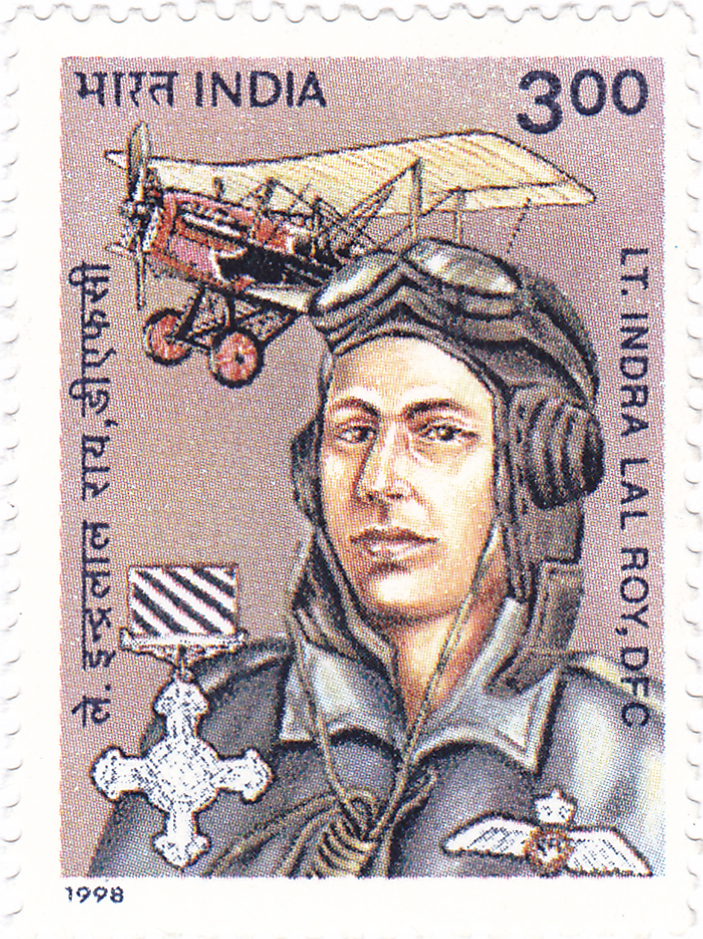
Indra Lal Roy on a 1998 stamp of India

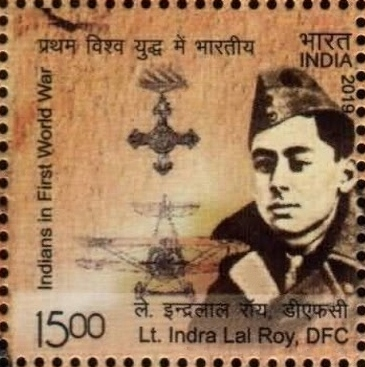
Indra Lal Roy on a 2019 stamp of India

Roy was posthumously awarded the Distinguished Flying Cross (DFC) in September 1918 for his actions during the period of 6–19 July 1918. He was the first Indian to receive the DFC. His citation read:

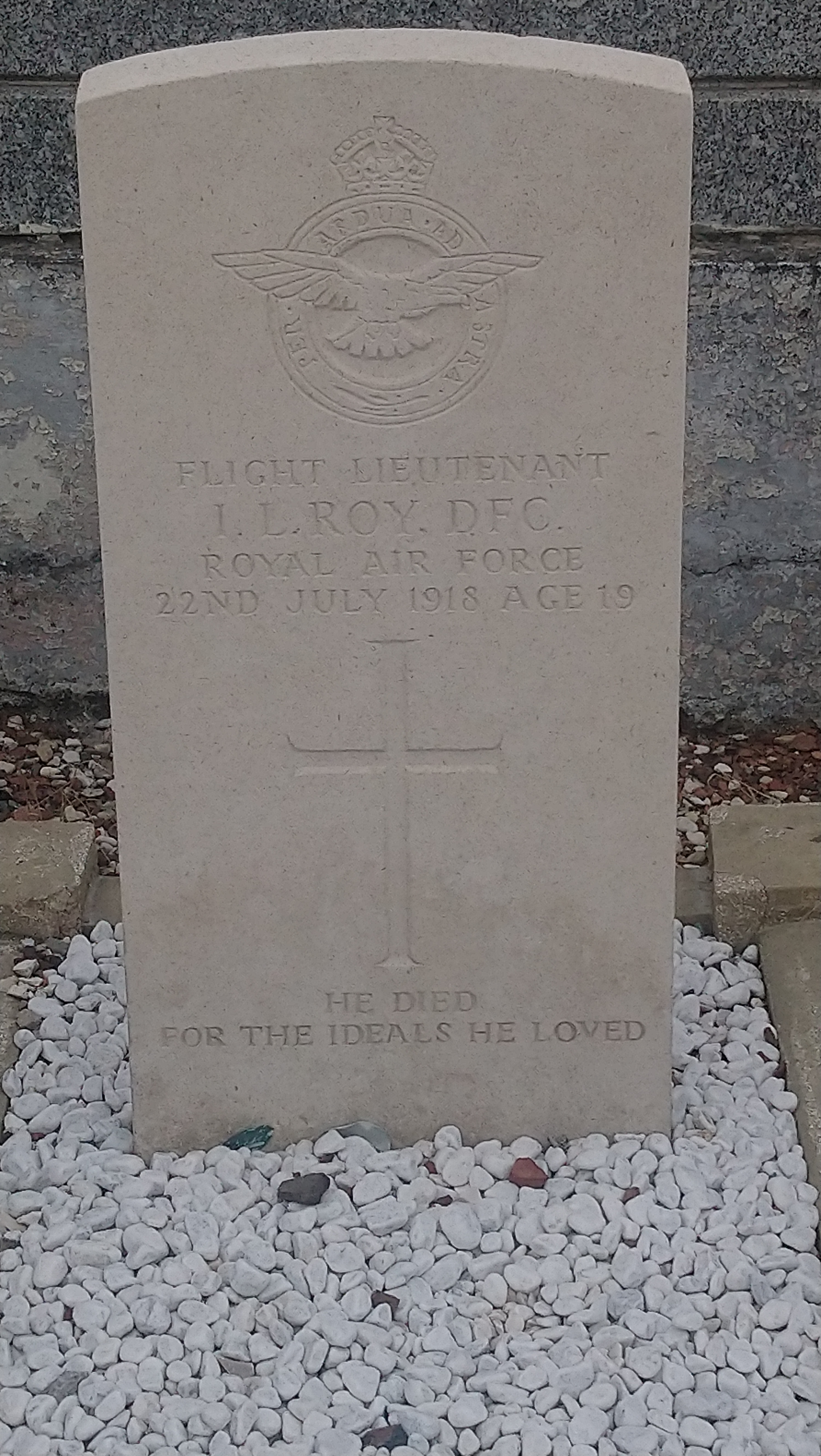
Indra Lal Roy's grave at Estevelles Communal Cemetery, Pas-de-Calais, France

Lieutenant Indra Lal Roy.

"A very gallant and determined officer, who in thirteen days accounted for nine enemy machines. In these several engagements he has displayed remarkable skill and daring, on more than one occasion accounting for two machines in one patrol. (20 September 1918)

In December 1998, to mark the 100th anniversary of his birth, the Indian postal service issued a commemorative stamp in his honour. Indra Lal Roy remains the only Indian flying ace fighter pilot to this day.

== See also ==
- Jeejeebhoy Piroshaw Bomanjee Jeejeebhoy, the first Indian military pilot, serving briefly in the First World War before becoming ill
- Hardit Malik, the first Indian pilot to fly in the First World War
- Erroll Chunder Sen, an Indian pilot in the First World War, one of the two survivors, with Hardit Malik
- Shrikrishna Chandra Welinkar, the first Indian pilot to be killed in action
- List of World War I flying aces from India, the rest being British and Irish men born in India
