= Suparna Singh =

Indian-American television executive

Suparna Singh was associated with New Delhi Television (NDTV). She joined NDTV in 1994 and was CEO of the company for 20 months until August 2019. She left the company in January 2023, a few weeks after Gautam Adani's group took over the company. She was with NDTV in various roles, executive and editorial.

== Career ==
Suparna Singh is a US citizen with master's degree in Television, Radio and Film from Syracuse University. She has worked at NDTV since 1994, rising to the post of Chief Executive Officer from December 2017 (soon after the death of CEO K. V. L. Narayan Rao) to August 2019, when she stepped down from that role. Her role was controversial as CEO as due to the fact that she is a US citizen which has been deemed incompatible with her position. She has been Head of Convergence at NDTV Convergence Limited since 13 January 2016. She also serves as Director of Strategy at NDTV Group. As the editorial and business head of NDTV Convergence, she is responsible for the content and expansion of NDTV's digital section, including its array of apps and its website.

Singh created and headed NDTV Metro Nation, the first English language, city-based channel in India on September 24, 2007.

She has also run NDTV's Promos department.
