= Bhagwati Bhola Nauth =

Indian social reformer, activist and suffragist

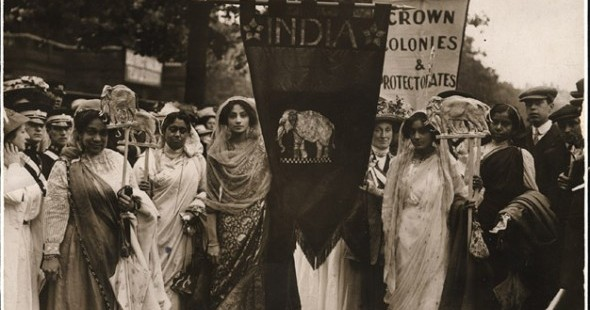
- Indian suffragists on the Women's Coronation Procession of 1911, including Nauth on the far left
- Born: c. 1882; Lahore, British India
- Occupations: social reformer, activist and suffragist

Bhagwati Bhola Nauth (born c. 1882) was an Indian social reformer, activist and suffragist.

== Life ==
Nauth was born in Lahore, British India, around 1882. She married Major Bhola Nauth, a doctor who worked in the Indian Medical Service, and they had two sons. She lived in England from 1908.

Nauth was the honorary secretary of the Indian Women’s Educational Fund was also a member of the Eastern League.

On 17 June 1911, the Women's Social and Political Union (WSPU) organised a Women's Coronation Procession, using the coronation of King George V to demand the vote for white women. Jane Cobden and Lolita Roy gathered an Indian contingent in advance of the procession, forming 'part of the 'Imperial contingent'. Nauth was among the group of Indian women who marched.

The women were invited to attend to appear "exotic" and to demonstrate "the strength of support for women's suffrage throughout the Empire." Their "beautiful dresses" (saris) drew admiring glances from the public. Nauth has been identified as one of the women marching with an appliquéd banner in a photograph from the procession.

Nauth was later involved in petitioning the British government for the enfranchisement of Indian women.

Her date of death is unknown.
