= Radhika Roy =

Indian journalist (born 1949)

- Born: Radhika Das; 7 May 1949 (age 77); Calcutta, West Bengal, India
- Education: Welham Girls' School; Oldrey Fleming School (SLP); Miranda House (BA); The New School (MA); New York University
- Occupation: Journalist
- Known for: Former Executive co-chairperson, NDTV
- Spouse: Prannoy Roy
- Relatives: Brinda Karat (sister)

Radhika Roy (née Das; born 7 May 1949) is an Indian journalist who is the founder and former executive co-chairperson of NDTV. She was the managing director of the company between 1998 and 2011. The company started as a news production house and became the first independent news broadcaster in India. Roy began her career in journalism at The Indian Express and worked for a period of time at the India Today magazine before becoming the founder of NDTV.

== 1949–1984: Early life and career ==
Radhika was born in Calcutta, West Bengal on 7 May 1949, at 5/1B Belvedre Road to Ashrukona Basu Mallick, a grandniece of Raja Subodh Chandra Basu Mallick and Sooraj Lal Dass, who had migrated to the city during the partition of India. In the 1960s, Radhika was sent to study at Welham Girls' boarding school in Dehradun, Uttar Pradesh. Radhika met Prannoy Roy during her teenage years. Prannoy was also from Calcutta, and attending The Doon School, a boys' boarding school in Dehradun. Radhika and Prannoy moved to London, United Kingdom for higher education, where they got married and then returned to India, settling down in Delhi. In London, she studied at the Oldrey Fleming School and became a qualified speech pathologist. She also graduated with a degree in English literature from Miranda House, University of Delhi.

Radhika Roy began her career as a journalist at The Indian Express where she worked for the editing desk. She joined the India Today magazine, where she was a new coordinator. Roy quit her job at the magazine to join The New School For Social Research for a post-graduate degree in broadcast journalism in New York, United States. She also applied for and completed a course in television production at the New York University Tisch School of the Arts. In 1984, Radhika Roy along with her economist husband Prannoy Roy founded New Delhi Television Ltd (NDTV). Both the Roys are considered to be the founders of company, but according to Prannoy, Radhika was the original founder of the company and that he joined afterwards. The company began as a production house for the public broadcaster Doordarshan, and became the first independent news broadcaster in India. NDTV is considered to be a legacy brand, which set the template for broadcast journalism in India.

== 1984–2022: Co-Chairperson of NDTV ==
Radhika Roy was the managing director of NDTV between 1998 and 2011, before which she was the chairman. She also held the position of chief executive producer. Prannoy Roy became the public face of the network, while Radhika Roy managed the editorial and backend processes. She grew a reputation for demanded high standards for editorial integrity and impartiality. Radhika had instituted a legally binding code of conducts for journalistic ethics in the company at a time when other broadcasters had none. She has also been described as having a sense of social justice and integrity, Roy had implemented measures such as arrangement of sanitary napkins in NDTV offices during a time when the debate over destigmatisation of periods in workplaces had not yet enter public discourse. According to a senior executive at the company, "[I]f Prannoy Roy is the face of the organisation, Radhika Roy is its heart and soul."

NDTV launched India's first 24x7 independent news channel in a 5-year partnership with Star India. In the partnership, NDTV managed the editorial and production aspects in exchange for a fee with an escalation clause, while Star managed the infrastructure and retained the profits. The partnership was ended in 2003 over disagreement in providing complete editorial control to NDTV. Following the split, NDTV became an independent news broadcaster after launched its owns news channels NDTV 24x7 and NDTV India. The company went public in May 2004 and became the leading media company in terms of market capitalisation by the end of the year.

Radhika Roy along with her husband Prannoy Roy were designated as the executive co-chairpersons of NDTV after 2011. Radhika continued to act as a steward for the editorial end of the company. She was reportedly well liked by her employees and remained heavily involved in the company's day-to-day operations to the point that she was recognised as the de facto CEO, one former employee described her working style to be sometimes controlling as there was no effective decentralisation in the company. The company began facing government pressure through litigations and intimidation of advertisers on the network after Narendra Modi became the Prime Minister, which was described as part of a process of cratering media freedom in the country. The government attempted to ban the Hindi news channel NDTV India in 2016 and retracted following widespread protests. In 2017, the offices of the company and the residence of the Roys were raided by the Central Bureau of Investigation (CBI) after a NDTV news presenter had questioned statements made by a ruling party spokesperson.

In June 2019, the Securities and Exchange Board of India (SEBI) barred Radhika and Prannoy Roy from holding managerial or board positions in the company for a period of 2 years over alleged withholding of information in loan agreements. The order was appealed against and stayed by the Securities Appellate Tribunal (SAT). In December 2020, SEBI imposed a fine on the Roys worth ₹27 crore (US$2.8 million). SAT directed the Roys to deposit 50% of the sum as conditional to a second hearing. The company moved to the Supreme Court of India (SCI) which exempted them from the deposits. Justice Dhananjaya Y. Chandrachud remarked that it was "brash" for the tribunal to have demanded it.

Doubts had also begun emerging by 2015 over how much control the Roys had over their company after it had become involved in a debt agreement with the billionaire Mukesh Ambani's conglomerate Reliance Industries following a series of loan transactions necessitated by the NDTV's downturn due to the Great Recession. In late 2019, the international news organisation Reporters sans frontières released a report, according to which, Radhika Roy directly held 16.32% of the stake in the company while her husband held 15.95% of the stake. The two held an additional 29.18% stake through a 50:50 holding company called RRPR Holding Pvt Ltd.

In December 2022, Radhika and Prannoy Roy sold 27.26 per cent out of their 32.26 per cent shareholding in the news network to Adani Group, who till then had over a 37% stake in NDTV, making the conglomerate, the single largest shareholder with over 64.71 per cent stake.

== Public image and recognition ==
Radhika Roy has a reputation of being a private person who stays away from fame and keeps a low profile. She has been described as being "quiet and behind the scenes."

Roy along with her husband were awarded the Ernst & Young Entrepreneur of the Year Award for Information, Communication and Entertainment in 2003. In 2007, she was featured by the museum on broadcasting history, Paley Center for Media as one of 50 major women figures in the history of television and radio broadcasting. She was also listed in Fortune India's list of 50 most powerful woman in business in India. In its 2016 list, the magazine remarked that she remains on the list due to her "sheer staying power in the face of adversity" and because NDTV remained one of the most trusted news brands in the country.

In 2023, Securities Appellate Tribunal overturned a 2020 order that held Radhika Roy guilty of insider trading which barred her from engaging in the securities market for two years. In addition, it also compelled her to pay money made through the alleged insider trading between 2006 and 2008.
