= Shrikrishna Chandra Welinkar =

Indian World War I pilot

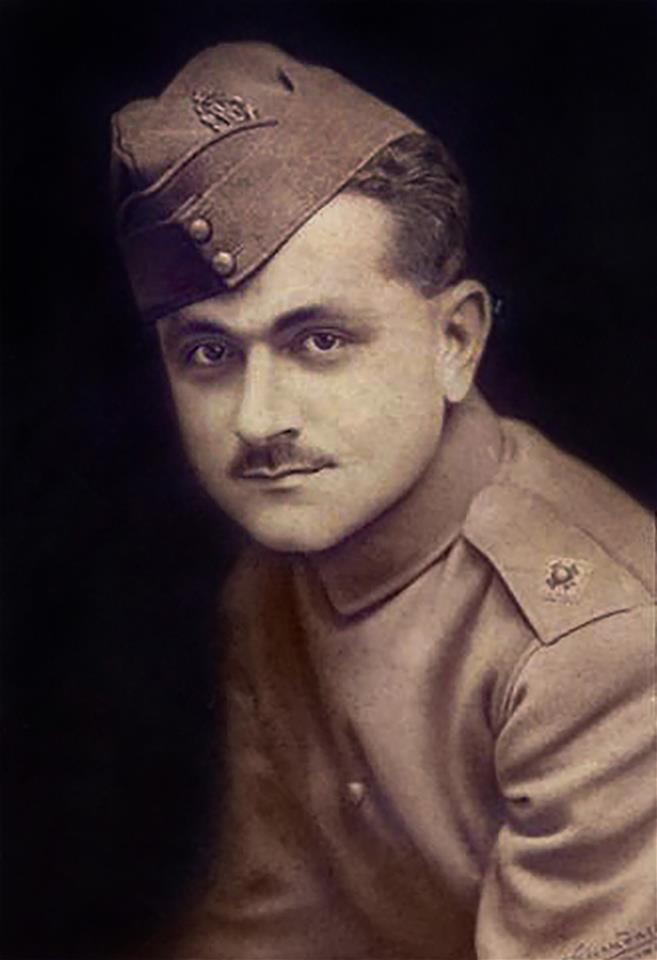
- Born: 23 October 1894; Bombay, Bombay Presidency, British Raj
- Died: 30 June 1918 (aged 23); Rouvroy-en-Santerre, Somme, Picardy, France
- Burial place: Hangard Wood British Cemetery
- Military career
- Allegiance: British Empire: British Raj; United Kingdom
- Branch: Imperial Service Troops; British Army (Royal Flying Corps); Royal Air Force
- Service years: 1916–1918
- Rank: Lieutenant
- Units: 3rd Gwalior Lancers; Oxfordshire and Buckinghamshire Light Infantry; No. 23 Squadron RAF
- Conflicts: World War I; Western Front †

Shrikrishna Chandra Welinkar (23 October 1894 – 30 June 1918) was an Indian pilot who served in the Royal Flying Corps and Royal Air Force during the First World War. Among the first Indian military aviators, he was also the first to be killed in action.

== Early life ==
Welinkar was born in Bombay (now Mumbai) in October 1894. A member of the Gwalior royal family's household, he attended St. Xavier's High School in Bombay, after which he joined Jesus College, Cambridge in the Lent term of 1915 to read history and law.

== First World War ==
After the outbreak of war, Welinkar was commissioned a lieutenant in the 3rd Gwalior Lancers, a Gwalior State regiment of the Imperial Service Troops, and was on the staff of the Maharaja of Gwalior. Becoming interested in aviation, he took lessons at a flying school at Hendon and obtained a Royal Aero Club certificate in August 1916. With 50 hours of flying time, Welinkar then applied for a commission in the Royal Flying Corps on 22 November 1916, but he was refused a commission due to his ethnicity and instead encouraged to be a member of aircrew as a mechanic. After securing a recommendation from Brigadier-General Sefton Brancker, Welinkar enlisted in the Oxfordshire and Buckinghamshire Light Infantry on 13 February 1917, and was posted to No. 6 Officer Cadet Battalion of the RFC from the same date.

On 24 May 1917, Welinkar was commissioned a temporary second lieutenant in the RFC, and was confirmed in his rank on 22 June with the appointment of flying officer. He was injured in a crash the following month, but soon recovered and completed his flight training in early 1918, having 63 hours of flying experience with various aircraft. In February 1918 Welinkar was passed fit by a medical board and posted to the Western Front. He was promoted lieutenant in the newly established RAF on 1 April 1918. Initially attached to No. 84 Squadron RAF, on 10 April he transferred to No. 23 Squadron based at Bertangles, which flew the Sopwith Dolphin.

== Death ==
At 9:45 a.m. on 27 June 1918, Welinkar took off from Bertangles on a patrol, flying his Dolphin (No. D3691). He was last seen flying east at 11:15 a.m. fighting a two-seater German aircraft near Péronne, Somme at an altitude of 300 to 400 feet. Having failed to return from his patrol, Welinkar was declared missing the same day. On 14 November 1918, three days after the Armistice, British authorities received a report that Welinkar had been shot down on 27 June. Having sustained bullet wounds and a leg fractured below the knee, he had died at a German field hospital in a town named "Rouvroy" on 30 June 1918. On 19 May 1919, Welinkar's record was updated, with his death "accepted for official purposes as having [been] caused in action."

In March 1920, an RAF wing commander named Hilton unsuccessfully attempted to locate the exact "Rouvroy" where Welinkar had been buried. The following month, G. B. Barton, a retired Royal Engineers colonel acting on behalf of Welinkar's family, informed the British government that Welinkar had initially been buried in a cemetery at Rouvroy-en-Santerre under the name "Oberleutnant S.C. Wumkar" and that believing Welinkar to have been a German officer, the French authorities had reinterred his body in Maucourt German Cemetery. On 7 September 1920, the grave believed to be Welinkar's was opened. Colonel Barton observed the exhumation and tentatively identified the remains as belonging to an RAF flying officer, based on the corpse wearing an airman's boots and watch. The body was reinterred in Hangard Communal Cemetery Extension, and in February 1921 was conclusively identified as that of Welinkar after a search of German military burial records.

In March 1921, Welinkar's family solicitors posted a notice in the London Gazette on behalf of Welinkar's mother in Gwalior, advising creditors of Welinkar's death. He left effects in England with a value of £136 0s. 6d. (equivalent to £6,683 in 2025) which remained unclaimed as late as 1927. In May, Colonel Barton wrote the War Graves Commission with a request from Welinkar's mother that a suitable gravestone be placed on his grave with the inscription: "To the honoured memory of one of the Empire's bravest sons who made the great sacrifice."
