= Lolita Roy =

Indian social reformer and suffragist

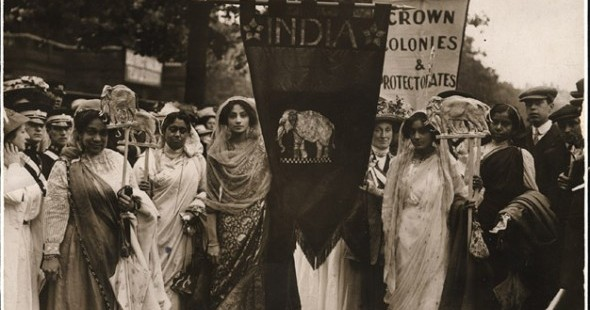
- Indian suffragists on the Women's Coronation Procession (1911). Lolita Roy on the left.
- Born: 1865; Calcutta, Bengal Presidency, British India
- Died: ?
- Other name: Mrs. P. L. Roy
- Occupations: Suffragist; Social reformer
- Known for: Leading the Indian contingent in the 1911 Women's Coronation Procession and presiding over the Indian Women's Education Association
- Spouse: Peraly Lal Roy (m. 1881)
- Children: 6, including Indra Lal Roy and Paresh Lal Roy
- Relatives: Subroto Mukerjee (grandson)

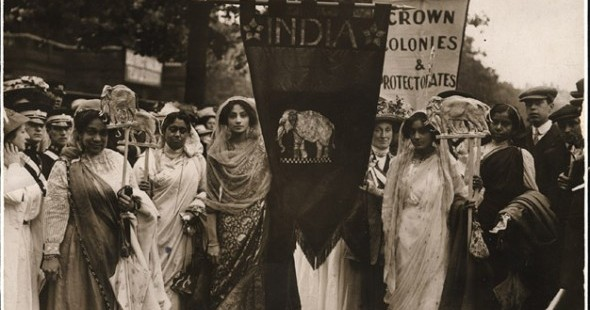
Indian suffragists on the Women's Coronation Procession of 1911, including Lolita Roy on the left.

Lolita Roy (born in 1865), also known as Mrs. P. L. Roy, was an Indian social reformer and suffragist who played an active role in the social life of Indians in London, as well as in campaigns for women's suffrage in Britain and India. She was described in The Vote in 1911 as 'one of the most emancipated of Indian women'.

== Life ==
Lolita Roy was born in Calcutta, India in 1865. She married Piera Lal Roy, a barrister and director of public prosecutions in Calcutta, in about 1886, and the couple went on to have six children: Leilavati, Miravati, Paresh Lal, Hiravati, Indra Lal, and Lolit Kumar. By 1900, Roy and her children were living in West London.

In London, Roy was active in multiple social and activist associations for Indians, including as president of the London Indian Union Society and a member of the committee of the National Indian Association (founded by Mary Carpenter in 1870). The London Union Society helped to support Indian university students in London (of which there were then around 700). In 1909, she helped to found the Indian Women's Education Association, which sought to raise funds to bring Indian women to Britain to train as teachers.

On 17 June 1911, the Women's Social and Political Union organised a Women's Coronation Procession, using the coronation of King George V to demand the vote. Jane Cobden and Roy gathered a small Indian contingent in advance of the procession, forming 'part of the 'Imperial contingent' and intended to show the strength of support for women's suffrage throughout the Empire'. A photograph from the procession includes Roy, Mrs. Bhagwati Bhola Nauth, and Mrs. Leilavati Mukerjea (Roy's daughter). Writing of their presence on the march many years later, Indian politician Sushama Sen recalled:

At this time the Women’s Suffragette movement who were fighting for their votes, was at its height. In those days there were few Indian women in London. Hearing of me they sent me an invitation to join their demonstration at Piccadilly Circus, and to march with them led by Mrs Pankhurst to the Parliament House... It was a great experience for me, at the same time it was a novel sight for a single Indian woman amidst the procession, and I was the subject of public gaze.

Activist and theosophist Annie Besant also marched with the Indian suffragists.

In 1912 and 1913, Roy assisted in the production of several Indian plays staged in London and Cambridge, offering advice and helping performers with traditional clothing such as turbans and saris.

During World War I, two of Roy's sons saw active duty. Her eldest, Paresh Lal Roy served in the Honourable Artillery Company for the duration of the war. On his return to India in the 1920s, he played a key role in popularising the sport of boxing. Her middle son, Indra Lal Roy (1898–1918), joined the Royal Flying Corps, and was killed in action. Lolita Roy served as honorary secretary of the Eastern League, which had been established to fundraise for the Indian Soldiers' Fund, providing clothing, food, and other items to Indian soldiers. In 1916, along with other suffragists, Roy helped to organise a 'Ladies Day', where items were sold at Haymarket, London to raise money for the cause.

As well as her work for suffrage in Britain, Roy worked actively for women's right to vote in India. This included petitioning the British government, taking part in a deputation to the secretary of state for India, attending a meeting at the House of Commons, and public speaking in support of the Indian women's suffrage. Throughout the 1920s she continued to work for suffrage in India, including through the All-India Women's Conference

Lolita Roy's death date is unknown.

Journalist and media entrepreneur Prannoy Roy is her great grandson.

== Legacy ==
In recent years, British historians and activists have sought to give greater recognition to the contributions of people of foreign origin within the British suffrage movement, including Lolita Roy. Dr. Sumita Mukherjee, a historian of the British Empire and the Indian Subcontinent, has sought to challenge 'pre-existing ideas surrounding the suffrage movement particularly in relation to the public commemoration in 2018 of the Centenary of the Representation of the People Act which, in 1918, gave some women the right to vote in the UK'. She argues that 'Western popular beliefs have largely ignored the roles of women of colour in bringing about this change'. Mukherjee's research has focused on the role of Indian suffrage campaigners, 'revealing that there was a thriving suffrage movement in the Indian subcontinent and that these women forged global networks with other suffrage campaigners transnationally'.

In April 2018, a plinth was erected underneath the Millicent Fawcett statue in Parliament Square, which featured the images of two women of Indian origin: the Norfolk-born goddaughter of Queen Victoria, Sophia Duleep Singh, and Lolita Roy. In the same year, an exhibition was staged at Hammersmith Town Hall featuring an artwork celebrating Roy's work in the suffrage movement.
