= Sumita Mukherjee =

Historian of the British Empire and India

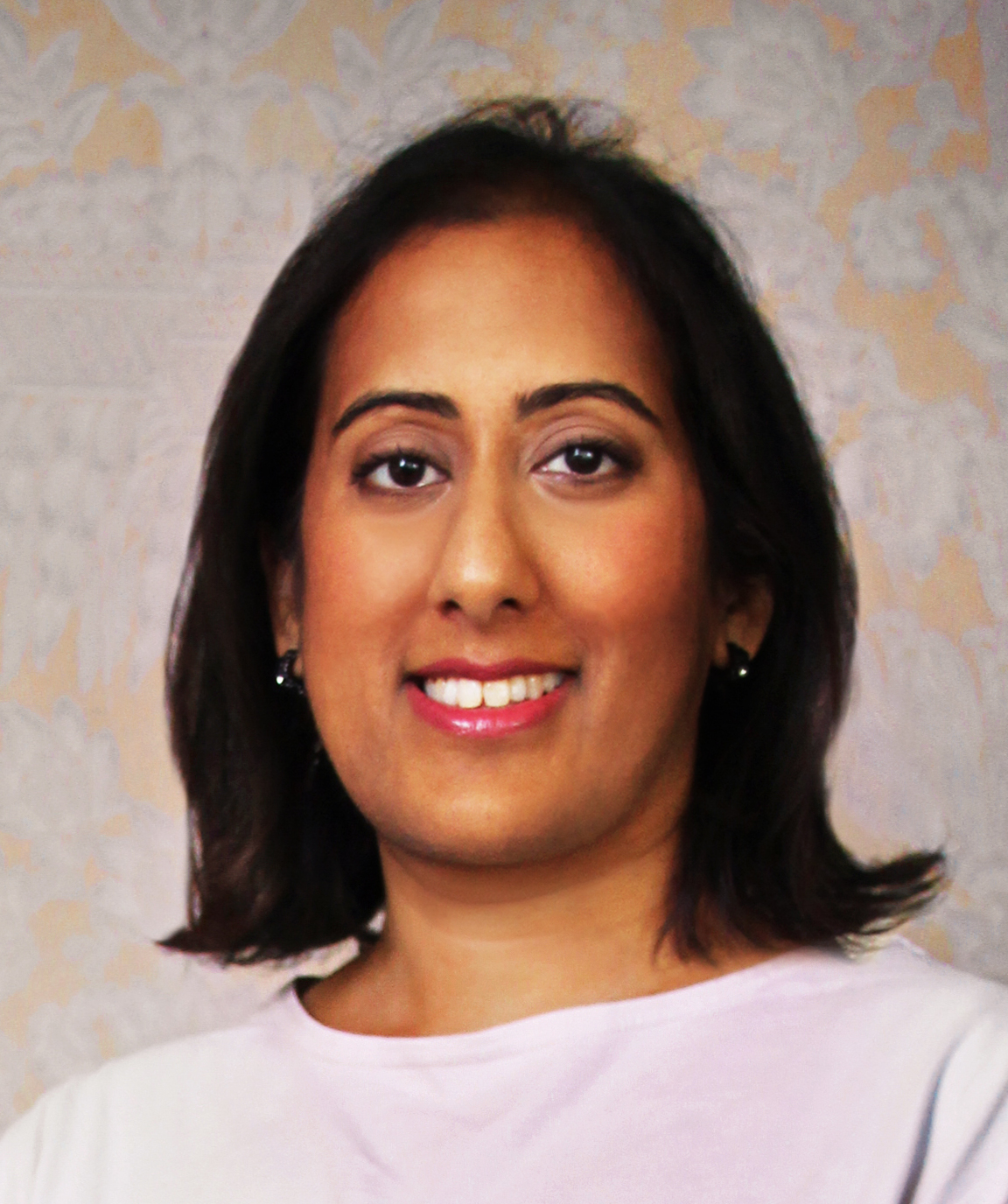
- Occupation: Professor

Academic background
- Education: University of Oxford

Academic work
- Discipline: Historian
- Sub-discipline: South Asian identity, Indian female suffrage campaigners
- Institutions: University of Bristol
- Main interests: South Asian transnational movement in the 19th and 20th centuries
- Website: sumitamukherjee.wordpress.com

Sumita Mukherjee is a historian of British Empire and Indian Subcontinent. She is Professor of History at the University of Bristol. She is the author of Nationalism, Education and Migrant Identities: The England-Returned (2010); Indian Suffragettes: Female Identities and Transnational Networks (2018) and Imperial Footprints: A History of South Asian Child Migrants in Britain (2026).

Her work focuses primarily on the transnational mobility of South Asian people during the 19th and 20th centuries.

== Career ==
Mukherjee has been awarded a BA degree from Durham University as well as a MSt and PhD from University of Oxford. Before teaching at the University of Bristol, she taught at University of Cambridge, De Montfort, Glasgow, King's College London, London School of Economics and Oxford.

Mukherjee's work was instrumental in the inclusion of Indian suffragettes Sophia Duleep Singh and Lolita Roy on the plinth of the Millicent Fawcett statue in Parliament Square, London. As of 2024, she is a Fellow of the Royal Historical Society and Deputy Editor of the academic journal Women's History Review.

== Bibliography ==
- Nationalism, Education and Migrant Identities: The England-Returned, Oxford University Press, ISBN 9780199484218
- Indian Suffragettes: Female Identities and Transnational Networks, Routledge ISBN 9780415502047
- (co-edited with Sadia Zulfiqar) Islam and the West: A Love Story?, Cambridge Scholars Publishing ISBN 978-1-4438-7445-8
- (co-edited with Rehana Ahmed) South Asian Resistances in Britain, 1858-1947, Bloomsbury, ISBN 9781441117564
- (co-edited with Ruvani Ranasinha, with Rehana Ahmed, Florian Stadtler) South Asians and the Shaping of Britain, 1870-1950, Manchester University Press, ISBN 978-0-7190-8514-7
