= List of World War I flying aces from India =

List of WW1 Indian aces

This is a list of World War I flying aces from British India.

- Captain Lawrence Coombes, born in Madras, garnered 15 aerial victories as a Sopwith Camel pilot for the Royal Naval Air Service and the Royal Air Force.
- Captain Maurice Douglas Guest Scott was credited with 12 aerial victories flying as both observer and pilot.
- Captain (later Squadron Leader) Edward Dawson Atkinson, of the British Indian Army, was credited with 10 aerial victories in two combat tours, one while flying a Nieuport and another flying a Royal Aircraft Factory S.E.5a.
- Captain Indra Lal Roy was credited with 10 aerial victories, within two weeks in July 1918, while piloting a Royal Aircraft Factory S.E.5a in No. 40 Squadron RAF. He is the only Indian ace of the war.
- Captain (later Group Captain) Arthur Peck of No. 111 Squadron RFC was credited with eight aerial victories.
- Captain Douglas Carbery scored six confirmed aerial victories while serving as an aerial observer in various squadrons.
- Lieutenant Thomas Cecil Silwood Tuffield had six aerial victories confirmed while flying as an observer in 48 Squadron's Bristol F.2 Fighters.
- Captain George M. Cox scored five aerial victories as a Sopwith Camel pilot for No. 65 Squadron RAF.
