= K. V. L. Narayan Rao =

Indian businessman (1954–2017)

Kotikalapudi Venkata Lakshmi Narayan Rao
- Born: 17 July 1954; New Delhi, India
- Died: 20 November 2017 (aged 63); New Delhi
- Occupation: Media Professional
- Years active: 1995–2017
- Family: General KV Krishna Rao (father)

K. V. L. Narayan Rao (17 July 1954 – 20 November 2017) was group Chief Executive Officer of Indian TV network NDTV and the president of News Broadcasters Association.

== Life and career ==
Born to General K V Krishna Rao, the 11th General of the Indian Army and later governor of Jammu and Kashmir in a Telugu Brahmin family in Hyderabad, Rao started his career as a journalist with The Indian Express, before joining the Indian Revenue Service. He has been with NDTV since 1995 and has earlier been responsible for the Human Resources, Administration and Operations of the Company. Narayan Rao has played a vital role in the transition and growth of NDTV from a production house to a broadcaster.

== Career at NDTV ==
Rao had joined NDTV as General Manager in January 1995, looking after human resources, administration and operations of the organisation. He was invited to join the board of NDTV in 1998 and had been its Executive Director since then. Rao was appointed Group CEO in 2007 and Executive Vice Chairperson in August 2011. In October 2016, he was reappointed for a second tenure as Group CEO of NDTV, in addition to his responsibilities as Executive Vice Chairperson.

He had held important positions as president of the News Broadcasters Association, member of the Indian Broadcasting Federation and vice-president of the Commonwealth Broadcasting Association.

Narayan Rao was also a member of the Ficci Entertainment Committee and the CII National Committee on Media & Entertainment.

== Family ==
He was married to Ms Renu and has two sons Jayant and Arjun.

== Death ==
He died on 20 November 2017 after fighting against cancer for two years, about 2 years after his father's death.
