= Rouvroy-en-Santerre =

- Commune
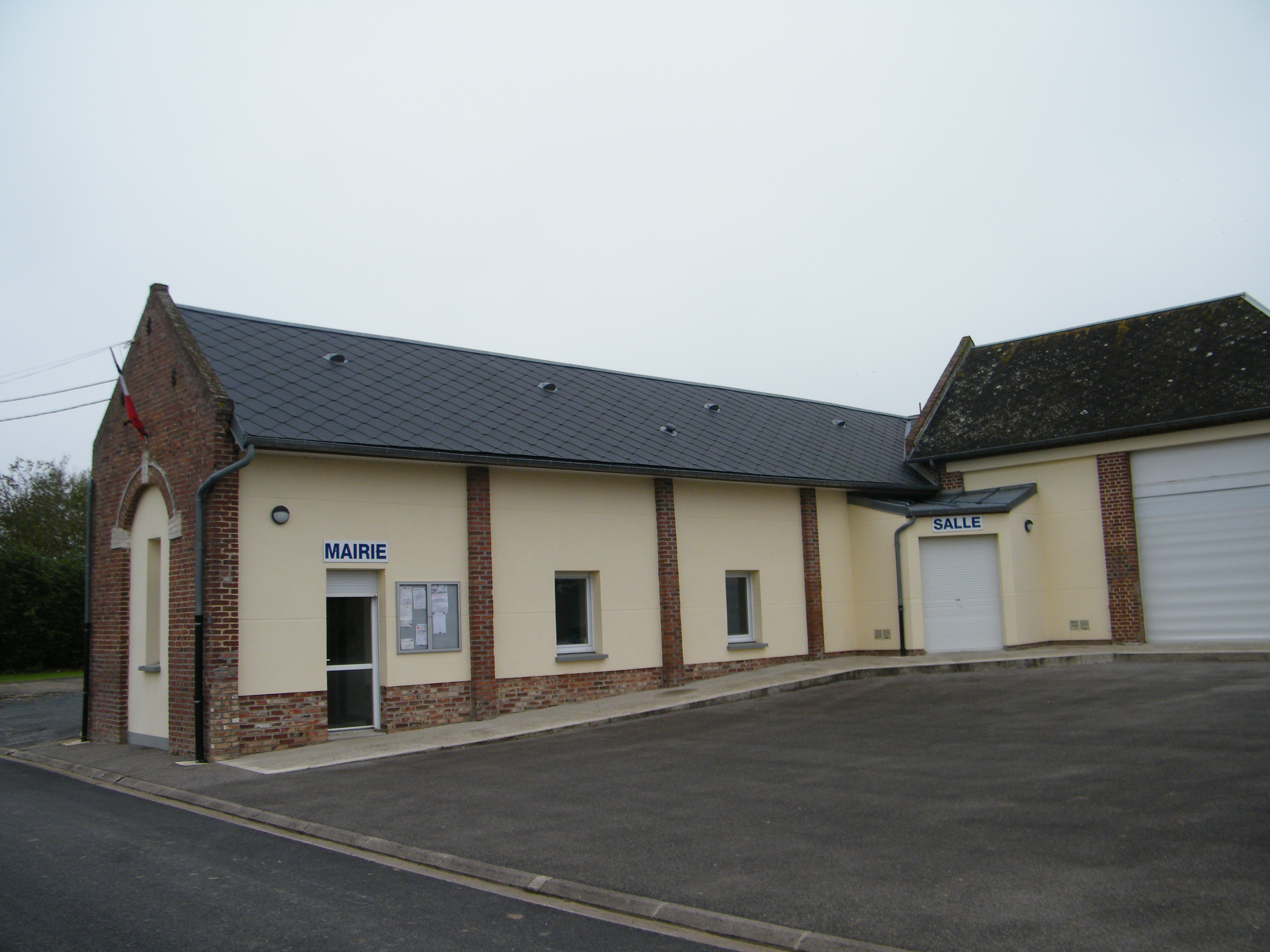
- The town hall in Rouvroy-en-Santerre

- Coat of arms
- Location of Rouvroy-en-Santerre
- Location within France Location within Hauts-de-France
- Coordinates: 49°46′11″N 2°42′34″E
- Country: France
- Region: Hauts-de-France
- Department: Somme
- Arrondissement: Péronne
- Canton: Moreuil
- Intercommunality: CC Terre de Picardie

Government
  - Mayor (2021–2026): Jérôme Broquet
- Area^{1}: 7.35 km^{2} (2.84 sq mi)
- Elevation: 89 m (292 ft)
- Highest elevation: 103 m (338 ft)
- Lowest elevation: 87 m (285 ft)
- Population (2023): 209
  - Density: 28.4/km^{2} (73.6/sq mi)
- Time zone: UTC+01:00 (CET)
  - Summer (DST): UTC+02:00 (CEST)
- INSEE/Postal code: 80682 /80170
- ^{1} French Land Register data, which excludes lakes, ponds, glaciers > 1 km^{2} (0.386 sq mi or 247 acres) and river estuaries.

Rouvroy-en-Santerre (French pronunciation: [ʁuvʁwa ɑ̃ sɑ̃tɛʁ], literally Rouvroy in Santerre) is a commune in the Somme department in Hauts-de-France in northern France.

== Geography ==
The commune is situated some 20 miles (32 km) southeast of Amiens, at the junction of the D161 and D131 roads.

Climate data for Rouvroy-en-Santerre (1991–2020 averages)
Month	Jan	Feb	Mar	Apr	May	Jun	Jul	Aug	Sep	Oct	Nov	Dec	Year
Record high °C (°F)	14.9 (58.8)	18.0 (64.4)	24.4 (75.9)	27.2 (81.0)	30.2 (86.4)	35.3 (95.5)	41.6 (106.9)	39.1 (102.4)	34.2 (93.6)	28.1 (82.6)	19.9 (67.8)	16.2 (61.2)	41.6 (106.9)
Mean daily maximum °C (°F)	6.2 (43.2)	7.5 (45.5)	11.2 (52.2)	15.2 (59.4)	18.5 (65.3)	21.8 (71.2)	24.3 (75.7)	24.4 (75.9)	20.5 (68.9)	15.6 (60.1)	10.1 (50.2)	6.7 (44.1)	15.2 (59.4)
Mean daily minimum °C (°F)	1.4 (34.5)	1.7 (35.1)	3.1 (37.6)	4.4 (39.9)	8.0 (46.4)	10.6 (51.1)	12.3 (54.1)	12.3 (54.1)	9.8 (49.6)	7.5 (45.5)	4.1 (39.4)	2.0 (35.6)	6.4 (43.5)
Record low °C (°F)	−17.5 (0.5)	−11.6 (11.1)	−12.5 (9.5)	−4.8 (23.4)	−2.3 (27.9)	2.2 (36.0)	2.8 (37.0)	3.7 (38.7)	−0.9 (30.4)	−6.1 (21.0)	−9.2 (15.4)	−14.4 (6.1)	−17.5 (0.5)
Average precipitation mm (inches)	45.6 (1.80)	43.0 (1.69)	44.1 (1.74)	39.4 (1.55)	61.3 (2.41)	55.3 (2.18)	63.8 (2.51)	62.4 (2.46)	45.1 (1.78)	58.1 (2.29)	52.4 (2.06)	65.3 (2.57)	635.8 (25.03)
Average precipitation days (≥ 1.0 mm)	10.0	9.9	9.6	8.2	9.5	8.2	8.7	9.3	7.9	9.9	10.0	12.4	113.5
Source: Météo France

== Population ==
Historical population
Year	Pop.	±% p.a.
1968	210	—
1975	172	−2.81%
1982	172	+0.00%
1990	185	+0.91%
1999	218	+1.84%
2007	209	−0.53%
2012	194	−1.48%
2017	212	+1.79%
2023	209	−0.24%
Source: INSEE

== See also ==
- Communes of the Somme department
