= Prannoy Roy =

Indian journalist and media personality (born 1949)

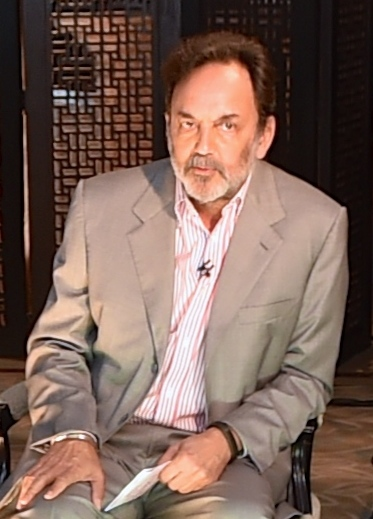
- Roy in 2014
- Born: 15 October 1949 (age 77); Calcutta, West Bengal, India
- Education: The Doon School; University of London (BSc); Institute of Chartered Accountants in England and Wales (CA); Delhi School of Economics (PhD); Delhi University
- Known for: Co-founder of NDTV & 'DeKoder'
- Spouse: Radhika Roy
- Relatives: Paresh Lal Roy (grandfather); Arundhati Roy (cousin)
- Awards: Asian Television Award; Red Ink Awards

Prannoy Lal Roy (Bengali pronunciation: [pronɔe̯ rae̯]; born 15 October 1949) is an Indian economist, chartered accountant, psephologist, journalist and author. He is the former executive co-chairperson of NDTV and one of its co-founders, along with his wife Radhika Roy.

He currently runs his new news company, 'DeKoder'.

== Early life and education ==
Prannoy Lal Roy was born in Calcutta, West Bengal on 15 October 1949, in a Bengali Christian family to P. L. "Hurricane" Roy, an executive at a multinational corporation in the city. His paternal grandfather was Paresh Lal Roy, a traffic superintendent and an amateur boxer, known as the "father of Indian boxing" for having popularised the sport in the country.

Roy is the great-grandson of suffragist and social reformer Lolita Roy and grand nephew of Indra Lal Roy, the first Indian flying ace. He is also a cousin of writer Arundhati Roy.

Roy attended La Martiniere Calcutta and The Doon School, the private boys' boarding school in Dehradun, Uttar Pradesh (now in Uttarakhand). He was at the boarding school during his teenage years when he met Radhika Das, whom he would later marry. Radhika was also from the city of Calcutta and was sent to the Welham Girls' School, another boarding school in Dehradun.

Prannoy and Radhika moved to London, United Kingdom for their higher education. Prannoy had received a Haileybury and Imperial Service College scholarship to acquire the A-level higher secondary certificate. Following his schooling, he enrolled at the Queen Mary University of London and graduated in 1973 with first class honours in economics. He then became a certified chartered accountant and a fellow of the Institute of Chartered Accountants in England and Wales in 1975. Prannoy and Radhika also got married in London and then returned to India, settling down in Delhi.

== Career ==
In India, Prannoy continued his studies at the Delhi School of Economics from where he attained a PhD in agricultural economics in 1978. Following his doctorate, Roy became a consultant at PricewaterhouseCoopers India where he worked from 1979 till 1983. Roy is described to have been passionate about election results since his childhood and had produced his first election forecast for the 1977 Indian general election. The forecast was published by the Mainstream magazine and had predicted a victory for the Janata Party. In the 1980s, he began collaborating with the Oxford political scientist David Butler and Indian economist Ashok Lahiri in an effort to mainstream the field of psephology in India. The collaboration produced three books, and Roy became an election analyst for the India Today magazine. For the 1984 Indian general election, Roy produced an extremely accurate election forecast which predicted an Indian National Congress victory with 400 seats. The prediction earned him the reputation of being the most successful psephologist in India. Roy is credited for pioneering opinion polling in India between 1980 and 1995.

New Delhi Television Ltd (NDTV) was founded in 1984 as a production firm for international news broadcasters and the public service broadcaster Doordarshan. Radhika and Prannoy Roy are considered to be the co-founders of the company, however Prannoy states that Radhika was the original founder as he joined the company later. Radhika Roy was working as a journalist at The Indian Express and then at the India Today magazine before becoming the founder of NDTV. Doordarshan was initially wary of allowing private production houses to cover domestic news, and NDTV was contracted to produce a weekly international news programme called The World This Week for the public broadcaster. The weekly was instant success among its Indian audience and attained one of the highest viewerships on Doordarshan.

Prannoy Roy, in the meantime, worked as an associate professor for a year in 1985 at the Delhi School of Economics. In 1986–1987, he was hired in a team of economists to build a macro-econometric model of India for the Ministry of Finance. The model is the largest of its kind. Doordarshan eventually contracted NDTV to cover the general election results and budget session specials. The first televised coverage of an election result in India was produced by NDTV for the 1989 Indian general election. Roy began his career as a television journalist by covering the general election for Doordarshan. Following which, he also began appearing as a news presenter in The World This Week programme. Both the election results coverage and the international news show were widely successful. According to Roy, it was not difficult to appear good in comparison to Doordarshan which he described as more radio than television and that the time period was the most "newsiest" in television history.

NDTV requested for and received a contract from Doordarshan to produce a daily news bulletin on domestic affairs called The News Tonight on its second channel in 1995. The Roys who were the promoters of the company sought and acquired investments from several Indian businesses for the company in order to produce the show, among its investors was the multinational Tata Group. Later, the company also received contracts to produce shows such as The News Hour and Good Morning India for Doordarshan. Prannoy Roy was the news presenter for the NDTV bulletins and became the face of the NDTV brand in the process. His wife, Radhika Roy kept a low profile in comparison, being more invested in the editorial and production processes of the company.

In 1998, NDTV entered into a 5-year exclusive partnership with Star India to launch the country's first independent 24x7 news channel. In the previous year, the incumbent director general of Doordarshan had also quit the public broadcaster and jointed its multinational rival, the Star network. These developments created animosity in the government and a parliamentary committee was set up to scrutinise the activities of the former director general which alleged that there were "irregularities" in the contracts with NDTV. The Central Bureau of Investigation (CBI) filed a number of cases against former officials of the public broadcaster including the director general and against Prannoy Roy who was the managing director of NDTV. The cases went on for several years in the form of a protracted conflict, until a court judgement in 2013 which acquitted all the accused of the charges, stating that there was no evidence of any wrongdoing.

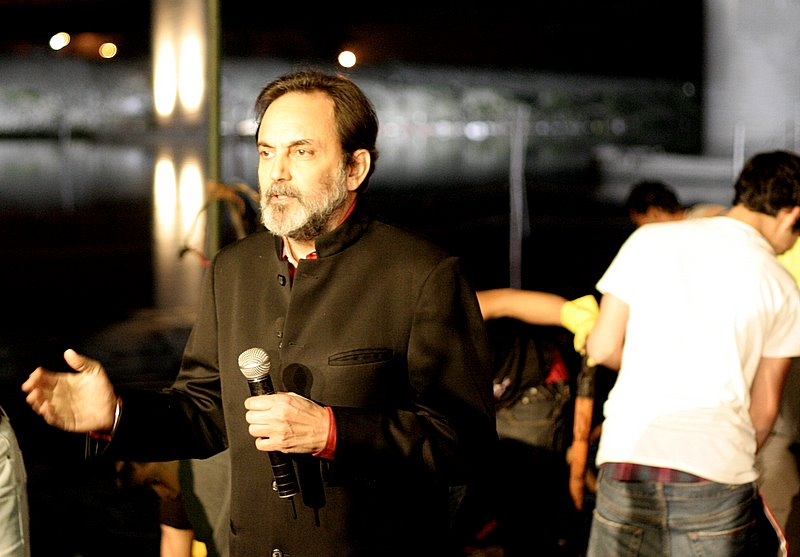
Pranoy Roy on Clean Yamuna campaign in Feb 2009

Radhika Roy, who was the chairperson of the company, became the managing director in 1998, and Prannoy Roy, who was the managing director, became the chairman. The partnership with Star India came to an end in 2003. NDTV became an independent news broadcaster in the same year with the launch of two news channels NDTV 24x7 and NDTV India. The company went public in May 2004 and by the end of the year had the highest market capitalisation among media companies. Roy, along with his wife, was designated as the executive co-chairpersons of NDTV after 2011.

NDTV started facing government pressure through litigations and intimidation of advertisers on the network after Narendra Modi became the Prime Minister in 2014. The pressure was noted to be a part of diminishing media freedom in the country, with similar tactics used against uncooperative news publications. The news network of NDTV had reported critically about state involvement in the 2002 Gujarat riots where over a 1,000 people were killed. The government attempted to ban the Hindi news channel NDTV India in 2016 and retracted following backlash, including cross media protests from journalists. In 2017, the residence of the Roys at Greater Kailash, Delhi were raided by the CBI, after a NDTV journalist had questioned statements made by a ruling party spokesperson. The Editor's Guild of India and journalists unions called it an attack on press freedom.

In 2019, Prannoy Roy collaborated with the psephologist Dorab Sopariwala and published a book called The Verdict: Decoding India’s Elections. Meanwhile, the litigations surrounding NDTV continued, and in June, the Securities and Exchange Board of India (SEBI) barred Prannoy and Radhika Roy from holding managerial or board positions in the company for a period of 2 years over alleged withholding of information in loan agreements. The order was appealed against and stayed by the Securities Appellate Tribunal (SAT). In December 2020, SEBI imposed a fine on the Roys worth ₹27 crore (US$2.8 million). SAT directed the Roys to deposit 50% of the sum, conditional on a second hearing. The company moved to the Supreme Court of India (SCI) which exempted them from the deposits. Justice Dhananjaya Y. Chandrachud remarked that it was "brash" for the tribunal to have demanded it. In March 2026, Delhi High Court quashed Look Out Circulars issued by CBI against Roy.

In December 2022, Radhika and Prannoy Roy sold 27.26 per cent out of their 32.26 per cent shareholding in the news network to Adani Group, who till then had over a 37% stake in NDTV, making the conglomerate the single largest shareholder with over 64.71 per cent stake.

In January 2024, Roy launched DeKoder, an AI-driven digital platform for analysis of elections and global trends in 15 Indian languages.

In January 2026, Delhi High Court quashed IT reassessment notices against Roy and imposed Rs 2 lakh fine on IT Department.

== Awards ==
His academic awards include the Leverhulme Trust (UK) Fellowship, Queen Mary Prize for results at BSc, and an OPOS Scholarship at the Doon School to study at Haileybury College.

He won the Red Ink award by Mumbai Press Club for lifetime achievement for his consistent and pioneering contribution to news television and his service to journalism in 2015.

== Bibliography ==
- Butler, David; Lahiri, Ashok; Roy, Prannoy (1984). A Compendium of Indian Elections. Arnold-Heinemann. ISBN 978-0-391-03200-2.
- Butler, David; Lahiri, Ashok; Roy, Prannoy (1989). India Decides: Elections 1952–1989. Living Media India.
- Butler, David; Lahiri, Ashok; Roy, Prannoy (1995). India Decides: Elections 1952–1995. Books & Things. ISBN 978-81-900612-0-9.
- Roy, Prannoy; Sopariwala, Dorab R. (2019). The Verdict: Decoding India's Elections. Vintage Books. ISBN 978-0-670-09226-0.
