= Estevelles =

- Commune
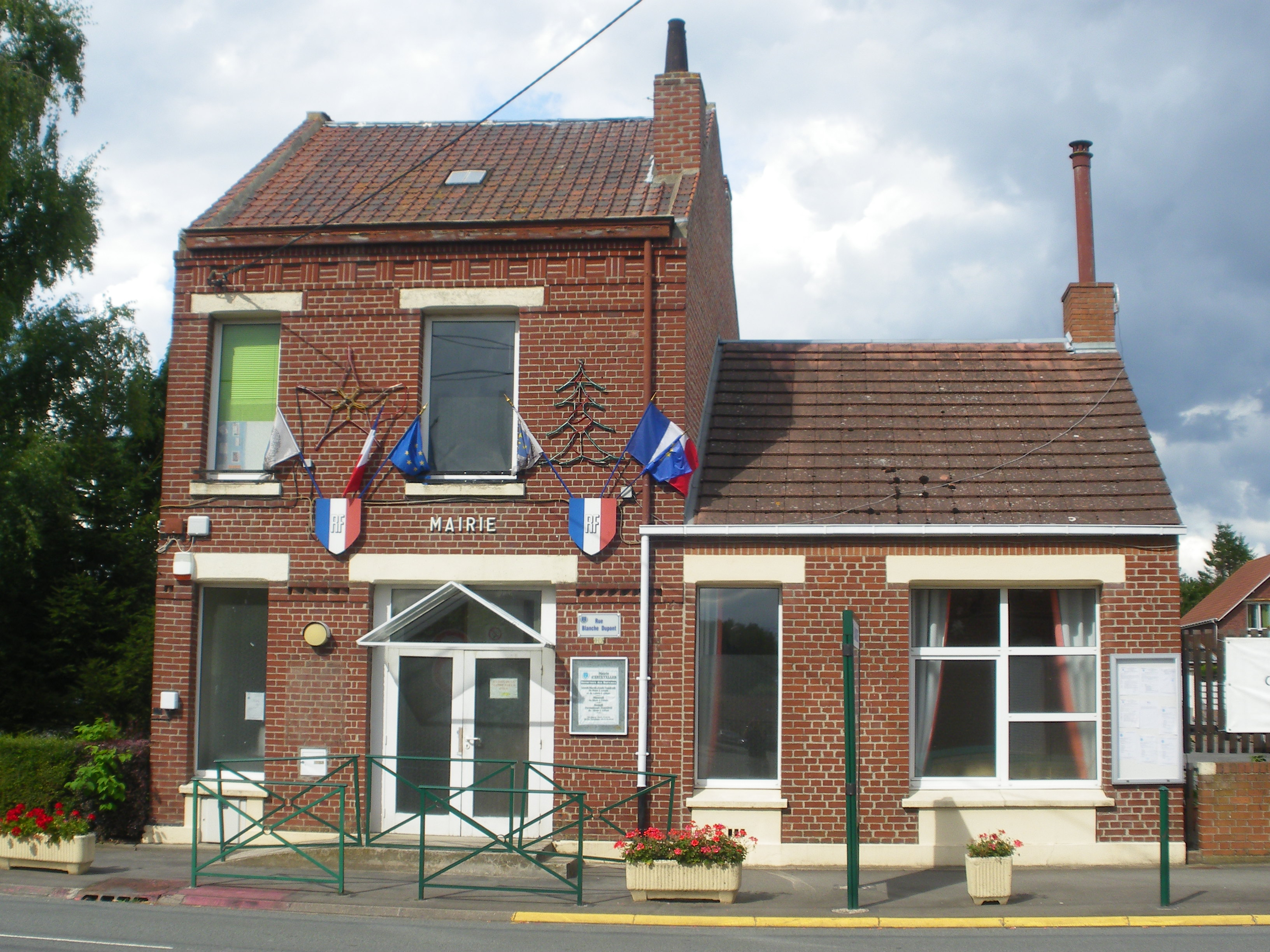
- The town hall of Estevelles

- Coat of arms
- Location of Estevelles
- Location within France Location within Hauts-de-France
- Coordinates: 50°28′34″N 2°54′31″E
- Country: France
- Region: Hauts-de-France
- Department: Pas-de-Calais
- Arrondissement: Lens
- Canton: Wingles
- Intercommunality: CA Lens-Liévin

Government
  - Mayor (2025–2026): Martine Chwicko
- Area^{1}: 2.54 km^{2} (0.98 sq mi)
- Elevation: 19 m (62 ft)
- Highest elevation: 46 m (151 ft)
- Lowest elevation: 21 m (69 ft)
- Population (2023): 1,979
  - Density: 779/km^{2} (2,020/sq mi)
- Time zone: UTC+01:00 (CET)
  - Summer (DST): UTC+02:00 (CEST)
- INSEE/Postal code: 62311 /62880
- ^{1} French Land Register data, which excludes lakes, ponds, glaciers > 1 km^{2} (0.386 sq mi or 247 acres) and river estuaries.

Estevelles (French pronunciation: [ɛstəvɛl]) is a commune in the Pas-de-Calais department in the Hauts-de-France region of France about 6 miles (9.7 km) northeast of Lens. The canalised river Deûle forms the southern boundary of the commune.

== Population ==
Historical population
Year	Pop.	±% p.a.
1968	1,237	—
1975	1,183	−0.64%
1982	1,151	−0.39%
1990	1,629	+4.44%
1999	1,687	+0.39%
2007	1,717	+0.22%
2012	1,981	+2.90%
2017	2,044	+0.63%
2023	1,979	−0.54%
Source: INSEE

== See also ==
- Communes of the Pas-de-Calais department
