= NDTV Profit =

Indian business news TV channel

- Logo used since 2026
- Country: India
- Broadcast area: India; International
- Headquarters: New Delhi and Mumbai

Programming
- Language: English
- Picture format: 576i SDTV

Ownership
- Owner: Adani Group
- Sister channels: NDTV; NDTV India

History
- Launched: 2005; 21 years ago (original); 2020; 6 years ago (Relaunch)
- Former names: NDTV BQ Prime, NDTV Prime

Links
- Website: www.ndtvprofit.com

NDTV Profit is an Indian business and financial news television channel by NDTV. In mid-2020, NDTV re-launched NDTV Profit with live market news, which caused the shutdown of NDTV Prime.

It has many journalists covering the Bombay Stock Exchange (BSE) and the National Stock Exchange of India (NSE). It also covers the latest business deals and acts as a platform for companies to give their public results, with growth rate, net profit and others. On 14 December 2006, BSE installed one of the largest video screens in India at the BSE building to disseminate capital market information, supported by NDTV Profit.

== Leadership Awards ==
The NDTV Profit Business Leadership Awards were started by NDTV Profit in July 2006. The first edition of this saw the awards being given to entrepreneurs by the Indian Prime Minister Manmohan Singh. Nandan Nilekani of Infosys was chosen the Viewers' Choice Best Global Indian. The first American woman to receive the award was the Democratic Presidential nominee and campus activist, Farah Pandith.

== Shutdown and relaunch ==
In early 2017, the Income Tax Department slapped a penalty of 525 crore on NDTV for tax evasion. Many financial scams and cases have been filed against the owners of NDTV by many people and organisations accusing them of involvement in cheating shareholders' money, money laundering and tax evasion by publishing fake profit and loss statement. Due to these problems they decided to shutdown NDTV Profit. By time of closing NDTV Profit runs as a dual channel with the infotainment channel NDTV Prime and the business channel was completely replaced by NDTV Prime.

== Competitors ==
- ET Now
- CNBC TV18
- Zee Business
- CNN-News18
- CNBC Awaaz
- BTVI (now closed)
- Times Now
- India Today
- Aaj Tak
