= NDTV =

Indian news network

New Delhi Television Limited
- Type: Public
- Traded as: BSE: 532529; NSE: NDTV
- Industry: Mass media
- Founded: 1984; 42 years ago
- Founders: Prannoy Roy; Radhika Roy
- Headquarters: New Delhi, India
- Key people: Rahul Kanwal (CEO)
- Products: Broadcasting; Web portals
- Revenue: ▼₹392 crore (US$41 million) (2024)
- Net income: ▼₹−21 crore (US$−2.2 million) (2024)
- Parent: Adani Group (64.71%)
- Website: ndtv.com

New Delhi Television Ltd (NDTV) is an Indian news media company focusing on broadcast and digital news publication. It was founded in 1984 by economist Prannoy Roy and journalist Radhika Roy.

NDTV began as a production house for news segments, contracted by the public broadcaster Doordarshan and international satellite channels when television broadcasting was a state monopoly, and transitioned into India's first independent news network. The company launched the first 24x7 news channel in partnership with Star India in 1998. In 2003, it became an independent broadcasting network with the simultaneous launch of the Hindi and English language news channels NDTV India and NDTV 24x7 (now known as simply NDTV).

In 2022, the Adani Group acquired a majority stake in the company.

== History ==
=== 1984–1998: Doordarshan era ===
In 1984, the journalist Radhika Roy and her husband, economist Prannoy Roy, founded New Delhi Television. The company began as a production house of news segments for the public broadcaster Doordarshan and international satellite news channels. It was converted into a commercial news network in 1988, and became India's first independent television news network. Doordarshan gave the network a weekly broadcast, The World This Week, an international news magazine programme commissioned by the director general of the public broadcaster, Bhaskar Ghose. The weekly news bulletin was described as an instant hit among its Indian viewers.

Doordarshan then contracted the network by to produce coverage of the Indian general elections and budget session specials, which also became widely popular. The first election result telecast NDTV produced was that of the 1989 Indian general election, which was also the first televised live coverage of an election result in India. It employed hotlines across the country and featured visual graphics, discussions and debates. The format NDTV developed contrasted with the simple official announcements Doordarshan publicised in previous elections and was adopted as a template by news broadcasters over the following decades. The terms of agreement between Doordarshan and NDTV were modified in the same year and the company began paying a fee for its weekly slot instead of being a contractor under the public broadcaster. During the initial years, there was a delay of 10 minutes between telecast and production of live news due to government regulations, which later shifted to five minutes.

The World This Week aired till 1995 on Fridays at 10:00 pm, and was described as "the only India-based programme which looked out at the rest of the world". In 1993, CNN began collaborating with NDTV to produce select coverage for the weekly news bulletin. The weekly was the first privately produced news bulletin in India, and became one of Doordarshan's top-rated programmes. Prannoy Roy said it was not difficult to appear good in comparison to Doordarshan, which he described as more radio than television, and said it helped that the time period was the "newsiest" in television history. The news bulletin covered several major events, such as the 1989 Tiananmen Square protests and massacre, the fall of the Berlin Wall, the dissolution of the Soviet Union and breakup of Yugoslavia, some of which NDTV covered live from their respective countries.

In 1995, NDTV presented a proposal to Doordarshan to move its production to a daily half-hour news bulletin on the second Doordarshan channel, DD Metro. The proposal was accepted and the bulletin, News Tonight, launched. The Roys approached five major Indian business houses for investments and secured agreements with all five, including the Tata Group. The bulletin was India's first daily domestic news broadcast The company also began producing shows such as The News Hour and Good Morning India for Doordarshan. Prannoy Roy anchored the NDTV news bulletins, in the process acquiring a reputation for reliable, authentic and sophisticated news reporting. The news bulletins gained credibility and were competing with entertainment channels for viewers, which made the network sought after for partnerships by international news networks such as BBC and Rupert Murdoch's Star Network at a time when restrictions on private participation in television broadcasting were being lifted and Doordarshan's monopoly broken by satellite television.

In 1997, Doordarshan director general Rathikant Basu left the public broadcaster and joined its multinational rival, the Star Network. His resignation led to a call to scrutinise his activities during his tenure as director general. A parliamentary committee was assigned to examine Doordarshan's finances. It alleged "irregularities" in its dealings with NDTV. On 20 January 1998, the Central Bureau of Investigation (CBI) filed several cases against Basu, five other officials of the public broadcaster, and Prannoy Roy. The cases went on for several years in the form of a protracted dispute, until CBI filed a closure report in 2013 and the Delhi High Court quashed the charges, ruling that there was no evidence of wrongdoing.

=== 1998–2003: Rupert Murdoch and Star News ===
In 1998, NDTV entered into five-year contract with Rupert Murdoch's Star Network. Under the terms of the agreement, NDTV would produce all news content for the network, while News Television India (subsidiary of Murdoch's News Corporation) would finance the endeavor. The CEO of Star India had stated that NDTV was an obvious choice for a partnership due its recognition and infrastructure. Star News was launched in February 1998 and was the first independent 24x7 news channel in India. It was a bilingual channel and aired both Hindi and English language programs. NDTV productions were also slotted on two 9:00 pm news bulletins in the channels of Star Plus and Star World. In 1999, NDTV launched its own news website called ndtv.com which streamed live webcasts of its productions and generated 55,000 daily views within a month of its launch. Over the following years, it also made its first foray into regional markets and began a Tamil language news bulletin on Vijay TV, a channel owned by the Star Network.

Star News was an immediate success, its revenue made the channel break-even at the onset. Star India was also able to capitalise on the experience gained in NDTV's earlier collaboration with CNN, one of its multinational competitors. The financial support provided by the multinational gave the channel an advantage over its emerging competitors such as Aaj Tak, the Hindi language channel founded by Living Media. Prannoy Roy remained as the face of the network while Radhika Roy, who was known for being low profile, operated the editorial process and reportedly demanded high standards for credibility, impartiality and independence. The channel developed sophisticated production values and a reputation for journalistic integrity. In a study conducted with Indian journalists, Star News was found to be perceived as the most professionally produced among Indian networks and was regularly viewed by a majority of journalists alongside Doordarshan and BBC World.

In the partnership, NDTV was given editorial independence, and produced the entire editorial content including in its packaging and presentation. It was noted that the channel occasionally used its own branded equipment such as microphones with NDTV imprints, without any dispute. Under the agreement, the profits belonged to Star News and NDTV was paid a fee which began with US$10 million under an escalation clause and reserved intellectual property rights over its productions. This arrangement reportedly became an issue of contention between the sales team of Star India which were under pressure to generate revenues and NDTV which intended to maintain in its editorial independence. In 2000, the NDTV news bulletin on Star Plus was removed, which was speculated to have been a signifier of the closeted conflict.

In an anecdotal testimony, Peter Mukerjea who was CEO of Star India between 1999 and 2007, states that an advertiser with the network who was the chairman of a major textile company had complained to him about a news report about environmental issues in a town which operated one of their plants and held Star India responsible for the reporters not taking into account the views of the company. Star News covered the 2002 Gujarat riots with investigative reports, in-depth analyses and live reporting of events. The channel's coverage resulted in it being blacked out for a day by the Gujarat Government under Narendra Modi. The censorship came a day after the Minister of Law, Arun Jaitley had accused "some networks" of conspiracy against the government on a live telecast of Zee News, a network that had assured him that they were not such networks on the same telecast.

In 2002, Star was willing to continue the contract but without complete editorial control being granted to NDTV which was unacceptable to the Roys. In the end, the negotiations between NDTV and Star India fell apart and the contract was not renewed. NDTV kept producing news segments for Star News till 31 March 2003. The company's unwillingness to succumb to government pressure or pro right wing editorial intervention from Rupert Murdoch, cemented his decision to exit the partnership as well. Murdoch went on secure a partnership with the Anandabazar Patrika Group for Star News, which was converted into a Hindi language news channel, and was noted to have become far less critical in its news coverage following the transition.

=== 2003–2007: Independent broadcasting network ===
Following the end of the partnership with Star India, NDTV began its venture as an independent broadcaster. The company had acquired equity capital from investment banks including Morgan Stanley and Goldman Sachs. Standard Chartered invested US$12 million and acquired a share of 12% in the company. Media commentators at the time had speculated that Star News would remain the market leader and decimate NDTV. Before the launch of the network's independent channels under its own brand, it had invested US$25 million into advertising. For distribution, it entered into a tie up with the network of One Alliance, a joint venture between Sony and Discovery, Inc.

NDTV launched two channels, NDTV India and NDTV 24x7, in 2003. NDTV India was a Hindi language news channel and NDTV 24x7 was an English language news channel. Soon after its launch NDTV 24x7 became the frontrunner in the English news segment, while NDTV India had the second-highest viewership following Aaj Tak in the Hindi language segment, which pushed Star News to the place of fourth highest viewership in the process. The channels introduced the concept of "break away" broadcasting in India with integrated receiver decoder (IRD) which could provide segmented region or city-specific news and with optional local language dubbings to viewers of the same channel. In 2004, NDTV became a publicly traded company and the board members reportedly included N. R. Narayana Murthy, the founder of Infosys and Tarun Das, the chief mentor of the Confederation of Indian Industry as independent directors. In December 2004, it stood as the media company with the highest market capitalisation, at a valuation of ₹1,433 crore (equivalent to ₹55 billion or US$580 million in 2026).

The network was successful in pursuing a strategy of promoting anchors as TV stars in an attempt to both consolidate its brand name and as an incentive for drawing and retaining a talent pool of journalists. Some of their journalists eventually started branching out to begin their own ventures, and a number of top executive employees left the network, including both the managing editor Rajdeep Sardesai and the chief financial officer Sameer Manchanda who left the network to join hands with the entrepreneur Raghav Bahl, who went on to launch CNN IBN. The resignations reportedly caused a number of problems for the network, the morale in the newsroom dipped and the network began finding it difficult to remain on top with an emergence of a crowded market with high competition as newer channels had more room for experimentation. Manchanda's resignation made the company's advertisers, the primary source of revenue to become vulnerable as the network which was solely in news broadcasting did not have extensive connections unlike others in the industry.

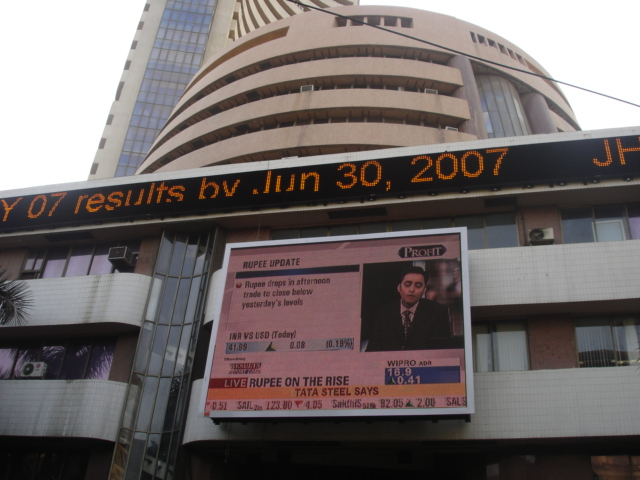
NDTV Profit's screen at Bombay Stock Exchange

Due to the founder of CNN IBN being from NDTV, among other examples, the network is widely credited for having created a category of media professionals with high credibility in the Indian broadcasting industry. In an effort to check further loss of employees, the company began offering extensive salary raises and stock options to its employees after the departure of Sardesai. It was noted in 2012 that the company had a high distribution of its wealth, with stock options worth ₹10 million (equivalent to ₹21 million or US$210,000 in 2026) being available to over 200 employees (15% of the workforce). In 2005, the network had also launched a business news channel called NDTV Profit. The channel would become a competitor of the leading business news channel CNBC TV18 over the next 5 years.

Despite the increase in competition NDTV had continued to grow and by the end of the 2005, the network had 19 offices and studios across the country. In 2006, the company founded 'NDTV Convergence', the subsidiary overlooking its digital media operations. In June, NDTV partnered with the Southeast Asian media company Astro to launch a Bahasa Melayu infotainment channel Astro Awani while taking a stake of 20% in the joint venture. Under the terms of agreement, NDTV instituted the infrastructure for the channel and Astro undertook the production. The channel was the first one to be launched by Astro and the first one to be launched by NDTV outside India. It had also made a number of agreements for overseas distribution of its Indian channels and had a growing audience among the Indian diaspora in the United States, United Kingdom, Canada, South Africa and the Middle East.

=== 2007–2015: Expansion attempts, financial crisis and digital growth ===
In 2007, NDTV began diversifying into the general entertainment and lifestyle broadcasting industry. The company founded the subsidiary of NDTV Lifestyle and launched the first lifestyle channel in India called NDTV Good Times on 7 September 2007. Following the launch, Smeeta Chakraborty, who was appointed as the CEO of NDTV Lifestyle announced that the company would be looking into expanding in other language markets and intended to launch three to five new channels within the next 2 years. NDTV Lifestyle also entered into an agreement with the United Breweries Group for a branding tie-up between the Kingfisher lager and NDTV Good Times.

In January 2008, NDTV entered into a strategic partnership with the American mass media conglomerate NBCUniversal, in an attempt to expand into the general entertainment industry in India. NBCUniversal bought 26% of the stake with a net valuation of US$600 million for the company and NDTV was expected to receive television formats used by the NBC in the United States. In an attempt to replicating the model of networks using general entertainment channels to subsidise newsgathering expenses, the network launched its first general entertainment channel NDTV Imagine on 21 January 2008. The channel's launch was also aided by Sameer Nair, the CEO of Applause Entertainment, who was in a partnership with NDTV. The operating company NDTV Imagine Ltd held a production studio NDTV Imagine Picture and entered into two partnerships to launch the music and entertainment channel NDTV Imagine Showbiz and the multilingual world movies channel NDTV Lumiere.

The company conceptualised a genre of channels which would focus on localised news and founded NDTV MetroNation, which was projected to launch a series of channels catering to metropolitan cities such as Delhi, Kolkata and Mumbai. The first and only channel to be launched under this branding was NDTV MetroNation Delhi. NDTV entered into a partnership with the national daily newspaper The Hindu, under the joint venture MetroNation Chennai to launch the Chennai-centric English language news channel which was named NDTV Hindu. Later in 2010, the company also entered in a partnership with the Dhaka based conglomerate BEXIMCO to launch the Independent Television, a 24x7 news channel in Bangladesh.

The expansion attempts coincided with the Great Recession and the funds raised for the expansion, through partnerships and bonds were exhausted within a short period of time. NDTV had an ongoing open offer for buyback of shares and the stock prices at the Bombay Stock Exchange (BSE) nosedived from around ₹400 to ₹100 which added a large shortfall. This caused the promoters of the company to go through a chain of borrowings from various multinationals. NDTV also made a series of divestments of its assets through a number of sales in the following period. In August 2009, the chain borrowings had eventually led the promoters debt being transferred to a shell company which was owned by a subsidiary of Reliance Industries, and in October 2009, NBCUniversal decided to pull out of the partnership and sold off its share back to NDTV. Following which, Time Warner bought out a 92% majority stake of the general entertainment subsidiary NDTV Imagine Ltd for US$124.5 million in December. The company had also launched a Dubai based English and Hindi language news channel called NDTV Arabia, targeting Indian expatriates in 2007, which was closed down in 2009.

The editorial credibility of the network suffered damage as well when recordings made by the Income Tax Department of communication by the Reliance Industries lobbyist Niira Radia were leaked and a series of transcripts called the Radia tapes published by the Open and Outlook magazines. The tapes prominently featured journalist Barkha Dutt who appeared to be violating norms of journalistic integrity. NDTV was one of the few news broadcasting companies which had a codified code of conduct for its journalistic output. The tapes came under the backdrop of the loan granted to NDTV by Reliance and included suggestions from Radia to the journalist MK Venu on how Roy needs to be supported. The Sunday Guardian, a newspaper owned by politicians M. J. Akbar and Ram Jethmalani also published a 2010 article which alleged that NDTV had colluded with ICICI Bank and indulged in financial misdemeanours. NDTV sued for ₹25 crore (US$2.6 million) and in February 2011, the Delhi High Court restrained any further circulation of the article.

The company's finances had taken a downturn since the Great Recession and its expansion ventures had failed, it also marked the beginning of a consistent streak of net annual losses. In March 2011, NDTV Lifestyle (subsidiary operating NDTV Good Times) was converted into a joint venture with the sale of 49% of the company's stake to Astro. The stake sale of NDTV Lifestyle resulted in the net valuation of the subsidiary to be US$80 million. And in October, the joint venture MetroNation Chennai which operated the channel NDTV Hindu was bought out by the Tamil-language daily newspaper, Dina Thanthi for a sum of ₹15 crore (equivalent to ₹34 crore or US$3.5 million in 2026). The joint venture had incurred a net loss of ₹20 crore (equivalent to ₹45 crore or US$4.7 million in 2026) in two years of its operation. In 2015, the business news channel NDTV Profit became a hybrid channel featuring both business news programs during day and entertainment programs under the name NDTV Prime on weekends and after 6pm.

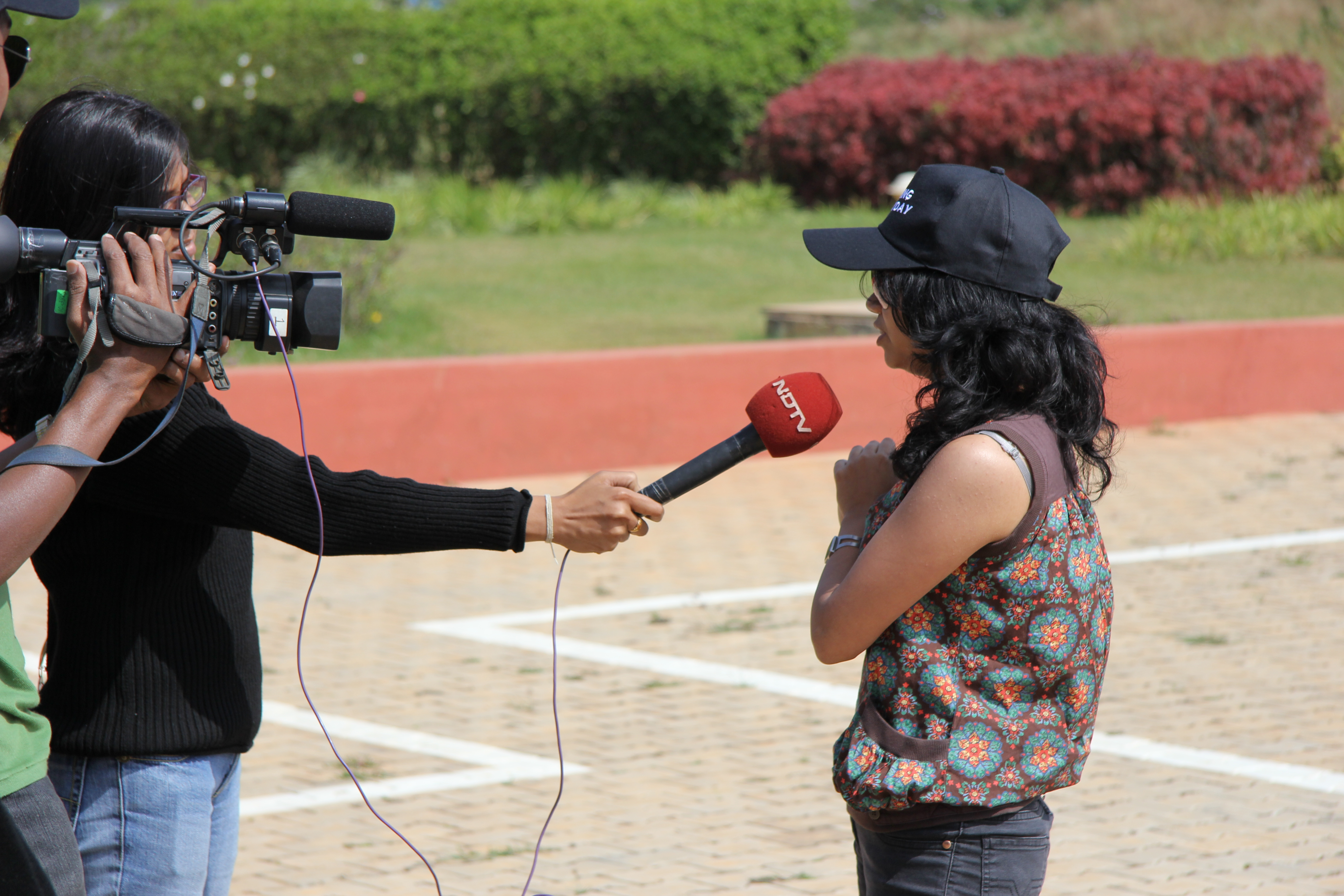
NDTV team conducting an interview in Bangalore in 2011

In contrast, the digital media arm of the company, NDTV Convergence had entered a phase of exponential growth. Between March 2011 and March 2015, it grew four-folds in terms of revenue and ten-folds in terms of profits and as a result increased its share of the total consolidated income from 4.6% to 18%. NDTV Convergence had synchronised the network's newsgathering with its internet and mobile presence. The digital media arm was credited for reducing the losses of the company by 50% between the financial years 2013–14 and 2014–15.

In addition, the subsidiary launched a number of online verticals namely the automobile portal CarAndBike.com, the electronics portal Gadgets360, the food and drinks portal SmartCooky and the wedding preparation website BandBaajaa.com which catered to consumer interest specific news. NDTV also launched the e-commerce venture Indianroots through its subsidiary NDTV Ethnic Retail in 2013. The venture was a fashion store selling Indian ethnic clothes and jewelries, which expanded its consumer base across India and the United States, recording a twelve-fold jump of its gross merchandise value in 2014–15, and featured over 700 brands and 100 designers with a valuation of US$85 million in May 2015. Gadgets360 also entered the e-commerce industry and began selling electronic devices from 2015 onwards. CarAndBike.com and BandBaajaa.com entered the industry as well and began selling products.

On 25 July 2012, NDTV moved a lawsuit for over US$1,000 million against the TAM Media Research for manipulation of data at the New York Supreme Court. TAM had instituted a television rating system called TRP, used to determine viewership of channel and fix advertising rates between broadcasters and advertisers. While the TAM data had been previously alleged by broadcasters to have been manipulated, NDTV's lawsuit was considered a landmark event which implicated over 30 companies and individuals of deliberately manipulating data and which eventually led to a number of broadcasters raising similar complaints. According to NDTV, the manipulated data had caused damages of at least US$810 million due to fraud and damages worth at least US$580 million for the network over a period of eight years. The lawsuit itself was dismissed while the ruling stated that even though TAM was registered in the United States, the damages were outside its jurisdiction, and in 2015, Broadcast Audience Research Council (BARC) launched its own rating system. In the following year, TAM was merged into BARC, although it was noted that the shareholders of the new entity had remained the same and the rating system continued to be vulnerable to manipulation.

=== 2015–2022: Government pressure and litigations ===
With the ascendancy of Narendra Modi to the premiership of India, advertisers with NDTV began to be pressurised to disassociate with the company and an array of litigations were initiated against the company. The government pressure against the news broadcaster was seen as part of a wider pattern of attacks on media freedom in the country.

In 2015, the Enforcement Directorate (ED) served a notice on alleged violation of the Foreign Exchange Management Act. In 2016, the Hindi language news channel NDTV India was banned by the government on allegations that the channel had threatened national security. The company subsequently appealed against the ban at the Supreme Court of India. The ban was withdrawn the following day, after popular outcry, protests from journalists and widespread criticism including from the Editor's Guild of India. In the same year, the Income Tax Department (ITD) served a tax reassessment notice which alleged that the company had committed tax evasion in the financial year 2009–10. The Delhi bench of the Income Tax Appellate Tribunal which functioned under the Ministry of Law upheld the findings of the department held the company liable for reassessment of taxation with penalty. According to the findings, the company had allegedly colluded with NBCUniversal, a subsidiary of General Electric in a complex money laundering scheme for evading taxation of what was noted to be relatively small amount of funds relative to the size of the companies.

In 2017, NDTV instituted a turnaround plan and announced that the company would undergo a restructuring process, intending to concentrate on core assets of news broadcasting and its digital teams operating its apps and websites, while cutting down on ancillary assets including its e-commerce business. The restructuring also involved layoffs of a number of staff and a shift towards mobile and digital oriented journalism. It was noted that while the debt had decreased considerable between 2012 and 2016, the valuation of the company had deteriorated.

The company sold NDTV Ethnic Retail which operated Indianroots and divested 2% of the stake in NDTV Lifestyle in favor of the luxury company Nameh Hotels & Resorts. Fifth Gear Ventures operated the automobile portal CarAndBike.com and was held by NDTV Convergence, which diluted its stake from 79% to 43%, granting a controlling stake to the company Autobyte Private. NDTV Profit was pulled off air on 5 June 2017, and converted into an infotainment channel solely under the designation of NDTV Prime. The business news segment of NDTV Profit was moved to the English language news channel NDTV 24x7. In 2018, NDTV Convergence also completed a sale with Wedding Junction Private Ltd and sold off Special Occasion Ltd, which operated the wedding arrangements portal BandBaajaa.com. In January 2020, Fifth Gear Ventures was acquired by a subsidiary of Mahindra & Mahindra.

In the meantime in 2017, the Central Bureau of Investigation (CBI) lodged a case against the company on allegations that it had defrauded ICICI Bank, and the offices of the company and residence of the founders, the Roys were raided by the bureau. The raid had come a day after an NDTV presenter had engaged in an argument with a spokesperson of the ruling party. The case was lodged on the basis of a complaint by a stockbroker Sanjay Dutt supported by the retracted Sunday Guardian article. It was noted that ICICI Bank itself considered the company to have returned the loan within a year and had not received any details of the case. The raids received condemnation and the CBI was accused of being under pressure from the government to act against the news broadcaster. In 2024, after the Adani Group takeover, the CBI investigation found that there was no wrongdoing in the ICICI bank sanctioning a loan of Rs 375 crores and closed its corruption and fraud case against NDTV founders Prannoy and Radhika Roy.

In 2019, the CBI lodged a new case against NDTV on allegations that it had laundered money and violated FDI norms. According to NDTV, government agencies were lodging different cases and then deliberately stalling investigations as no evidence were found. In same year, the Securities and Exchange Board of India (SEBI) barred the Roys from accessing the securities market and from holding any managerial or board positions in the company for two years on allegations that the promoters had failed to disclose agreements to minority stakeholders of the company. In 2020, the Supreme Court of India quashed the ITD notice against the company on the grounds that its allegation contradicted the statements presented by the Revenue Department.

In 2020, an independent technology startup Prashnam conducted a survey which calculated that NDTV India was the news channel with the highest viewership in the Hindi speaking states of Bihar, Jharkhand and Rajasthan, and the second highest viewership in the state of Madhya Pradesh, ranging around 23–24% of the population in the respective states. In 2022, NDTV pulled out of the ratings agency BARC as it was not satisfied with the changes introduced in the calculation of TV rating after the TRP scam expose.

=== 2022 onwards: Acquisition by Adani Group ===
In August 2022, Adani Group, a multinational conglomerate, acquired a 100 per cent stake in Vishvapradhan Commercial Private Limited (VCPL), who owned convertible debentures (in the form of warrants) in Radhika Roy Prannoy Roy (RRPR) Holding Pvt Ltd, which in turn owned 29.18 per cent stake in NDTV. With the VCPL purchase, the Adani Group indirectly acquired these warrants which would give it a 29.18 per cent stake in NDTV on conversion. VCPL notified RRPR Holding of its intention to convert these warrants (issued in 2009) into equity shares, giving the firm 99.5 per cent control. With these shares of RRPL Holding, VCPL was entitled to 29.18 per cent stake in NDTV.

In November 2022, the Adani Group launched an open offer to acquire an additional stake in NDTV, resulting in acquisition of 8% additional stake, increasing its total shareholding to above 37% in the media company.

In December 2022, Radhika and Prannoy Roy sold 27.26 per cent out of their 32.26 per cent shareholding in the news network to Adani Group, making the conglomerate, the single largest shareholder with over 64.71 per cent stake.

Acquisition of NDTV by the Adani group led by billionaire Gautam Adani, who allegedly has close ties to the Prime Minister Narendra Modi, raised widespread negative reactions and criticism from prominent Western media outlets like The Guardian, The Washington Post and Bloomberg, among others. The Economist stated that before the acquisition by the Adani group, the news channel was "critical of the government but is now supine." The hostile takeover of NDTV by the Adani Group has raised concerns about the future of independent journalism in India. The Adani Group has a close relationship with the Indian government, and there are fears that it may use NDTV to promote its own interests. The takeover attempt was also described to resemble the takeover of the largest news broadcaster Network18, that had occurred earlier under Mukesh Ambani, another billionaire with close ties to Narendra Modi. The Delhi Union of Journalists released a statement raising concerns that two "oligarchs" were taking over independent news broadcasters and stifling critical journalism at the behest of the ruling establishment. Presenter Ravish Kumar resigned from the channel in protest over what he called the new owner's lack of independence from the government.

The takeover by Adani led to resignations by many prominent members of the channel. The list included journalists Ravish Kumar, Sreenivasan Jain, Nidhi Razdan and Sarah Jacob, channel's group president Suparna Singh, Chief Strategy Officer Arijit Chatterjee, Chief Technology and Product Officer Kawaljit Singh Bedi.

== Subsidiaries ==
NDTV operates three broadcast channels which includes two news channels and one infotainment channel. The company has a stake three more channels which are managed through joint ventures.

In addition, it has auxiliary services subsidiaries such as NDTV Labs, a research and development company set up exclusively to augment production process within the group, and NDTV Emerging Markets, a consultancy firm set up to assist in the launch of NDTV news channels outside India.

=== Broadcast ===
The English language news channel NDTV is considered to be the first 24x7 news channel in India, being a successor to STAR News which was founded by NDTV and Star India. It is available internationally, through various distribution partnerships including one with Time Warner Cable and DirecTV in the United States. The channel operates under the designation of ATN NDTV 24x7 in Canada as it broadcasts its programming through the Asian Television Network.

The Hindi language news channel NDTV India is a national news channel and has widespread viewership in India.

The infotainment channel NDTV Prime was known as an innovation for being part of a two in one hybrid channel with NDTV Profit, with the same channel providing business news in daytime during weekdays under the designation of Profit and information and entertainment at other times under the designation of Prime. The channel was later converted into a full time infotainment channel and the business news programs shifted to NDTV 24x7.

The subsidiary NDTV Lifestyle which launched the first lifestyle channel in India called NDTV Good Times, continues to operate the channel in a joint venture with the Southeast Asian media company Astro. NDTV also has two joint ventures where it manages the broadcast infrastructure of the infotainment channel Astro Awani in Southeast Asia and manages the news channel Independent Television with BEXIMCO in Bangladesh.

=== Digital ===
The subsidiary NDTV Convergence was set up as the digital branch of the company, and manages all its digital properties including its websites, apps and social media assets. The company has an exclusive partnership for advertisements on and content recommendations for NDTV's digital assets with the Israeli advertising company Taboola.

NDTV Convergence is considered as an international news channel of the company with its output available to audiences outside India. The flagship website of the company ndtv.com, is among the most widely used news sites and has widespread audience reach in India. The company operates a number of separate web portals including one that is managed through a subsidiary called SmartyCooky, which operates the food portal under the designation of NDTV Food. The site also features podcasts of which competes with international brands such as TED and Oprah among the Indian audience. The .in domain for ndtv was noted to have been heavily contested and was acquired at extreme value by the company.

In addition, NDTV provides news services through the NDTV mobile app which has subscription offers of ₹550 (equivalent to ₹750 or US$7.70 in 2026) per annum for an advertisement-free experience. The app is one of the most used news apps in India competing with the mobile app of the national newspaper The Hindu, apps of Bennett, Coleman & Co publications and the apps of news aggregators such as Google News and Flipboard.

It has a centralised social media control with assigned teams, the social media editors are composed of staff who have volunteered for handling digital media operations and work in collaboration with their website and television channels for their news output and are noted for prioritising monitoring of news agencies, international bodies and persons of interest on social media as part of their newsgathering operations. In a social network analysis of news outlets on Twitter, it was found that NDTV was one of the most prominent nodes alongside The Indian Express and The Times of India.

== Channels ==
=== Current channels ===
Name	Category	Language	SD/HD Availability	Launching Year	Notes
NDTV	News	English	SD	2003	Formerly NDTV 24×7
NDTV India	News	Hindi	SD	2003	
NDTV Profit	Business News	English	SD	2005	
NDTV World	International News	English	SD	2024	
NDTV Madhya Pradesh/Chhattisgarh	Regional News	Hindi	SD	2023	
NDTV Rajasthan	Regional News	Hindi	SD	2023	
NDTV Marathi	Regional News	Marathi	SD	2024	

=== Former channels ===
Name	Category	Language	SD/HD Availability	Launching Date	Dissolving Date	Notes
NDTV Imagine	General entertainment	Hindi	SD	2008	2012	
NDTV Imagine Showbiz	Bollywood News	Hindi	SD	2008	2011	Replaced by Big Magic
NDTV Lumière	Movies	English	SD	2009	2012	
NDTV Hindu	News	English	SD	2009	2012	Rebranded as Thanthi TV
NDTV Good Times	Lifestyle	English	SD	2007	2018	Rebranded as Good Times
NDTV Prime	Infotainment	English	SD	2017	2020	Rebranded as NDTV Profit
NDTV Arabia	News	English	SD	2004	2009	

== Corporate affairs ==
=== Ownership ===
Till August 2022, the co-founders, journalist Radhika Roy and economist Prannoy Roy, the promoters of the company and had a controlling stake of 61.45%; individually holding 16.32% and 15.95% of the shares respectively, and jointly holding an additional 29.18% through a holding company called RRPR.

Among other shareholders are the Mauritius based LTS Investment Fund and Vikasa India EIF I Fund which hold 9.75% and 4.42% respectively. Both the companies have links to the Adani Group, LTS Investment Fund in particular has investments worth ₹19,328 crore (US$2.0 billion) in 13 Indian companies of which 4 belong to the Adani Group and the investments in these 4 constitute around 98% of their total investments, worth ₹18,916.7 crore (US$2.0 billion).

NDTV is noted for its stock options available to its employees and a consequent high distribution of wealth among its employees, with around 24.4% of the shares are owned through individual shareholdings of 1% or less in 2019. In 2022, the small shareholding comprised 23.85% were divided among 29,691 individuals and 947 entities. Four of these entities were Drolia Agencies, GRD Securities, Adesh Broking and Confirm Rebuild, which had interlinked directors and collectively held 7.11%.

In December 2022, Prannoy and Radhika Roy sold 27.26 per cent out of their 32.26 per cent shareholding in the news network to the Adani Group, which till then had over a 37% stake in the media company, making the conglomerate, the single largest shareholder with over 64.71 per cent stake.

=== Corporate governance and culture ===
The two founders are designated as the executive co-chairpersons of the company, and a number of vice co-chairpersons have been appointed as the chief executive officer (CEO) from time to time. K. V. L. Narayan Rao was the CEO of the company between 2007 and 2013, followed by Vikram Chandra whose tenure ended in 2016 and Rao was re-appointed until his death in 2017. Suparna Singh was appointed as an interim CEO and resigned in 2019. On 27 March 2023, Adani appointed former SEBI chairman U. K. Sinha and Welspun India CEO Dipali Goenka as independent directors for a two-year term. Sinha was also designated as Non-Executive Chairman of the Board.

NDTV was one of the first companies in India to make an independent foray in the media industry. The company was founded at a time when a few private operators were permitted on the official broadcast channels, and initially recruited journalists with bureaucratic connections. It eventually developed collegial newsrooms, and began offering greater benefits in an attempt to recruit and retain a pool of talented journalists. For a period, the newsrooms had acquired the moniker of "Roys boys" at a time when Prannoy Roy used to be the anchor and would refer to his colleagues as a "family" which is described by some of his former staff to have been broken when the editor-in-chief Rajdeep Sardesai resigned after the company went public. The newsrooms themselves were stewarded by Radhika Roy since the inception, who is described to have been incessant on maintaining a high standard for its editorial output, in the process instituting a code of conduct for journalistic ethics.

Since the inception of the Ramnath Goenka Excellence in Journalism Awards, the journalists of the company's news channels have been the recipient one or more award every single year with the exception of 2013 and 2018, collectively winning 32 individual awards across various categories. It also has a high employee retention rate, with 28% of the workforce having been employed in it for over 10 years, considered to be unprecedented in the electronic media industry, which has an average service period of less than four years. Due to a number of notable broadcast journalists and media executives of various other companies emerging from employment under NDTV, the company has acquired a reputation of being a "training ground" for television broadcasting in India.
