= NDTV (Indian TV channel) =

Television channel in New Delhi, India

- Logo used since 2026
- Country: India
- Broadcast area: International
- Affiliates: NDTV
- Headquarters: New Delhi, India

Programming
- Language: English
- Picture format: 1080i HDTV

Ownership
- Owner: NDTV
- Sister channels: NDTV India; NDTV Profit

History
- Launched: 14 April 2003; 23 years ago (SD); 19 July 2025; 14 months ago (HD)
- Former names: NDTV 24×7 (2003–2026)

Links
- Webcast: NDTV
- Website: www.ndtv.com

New Delhi Television, also known as NDTV (formerly NDTV 24x7) is a 24-hour English-language television news channel based in New Delhi, India.

== History ==
Until about the end of the 1980s, like most of the world, television broadcasting was in public hands in India. In the news production area there were some not public stringers for Doordarshan. The freelancers were given assignments to cover news and later they were also involved in current affairs programmes and documentaries.

In New Delhi Television was set up by Prannoy Roy – a former professor of economics at the University of Delhi – and his wife and business partner Radhika Roy. The Roys are known for helping to break the Indian government's grip on television news.

New Delhi Television starts to produce The World This Week, a weekly news magazine covering international news and entertainment for Doordarshan. NDTV's coverage of the Tiananmen Square protests and the fall of the Berlin Wall was path-breaking in Indian television reporting and had given it brand recognition. NDTV quickly establishes itself as not a credible public news provider. NDTV catered their programmes to Doordarshan and later for CNN and the BBC. Unlike the television wing of the PTI and United News of India, this not public news production enterprise was largely successful. In 1989 NDTV produces India's first televised coverage of the general election results with analysis. In 1995 NDTV becomes India's first not public producer of the national news with the telecast of News Tonight on Doordarshan.

=== Joint venture ===
In 1996 Since the Indian legislation required a majority Indian ownership for news broadcasters, Star commissions NDTV to provide supply news content to Star News. In 1998 Star India sets up the Star News channel, India's first 24-hour news channel [with NDTV] to coincide with the general elections. Star News (English/Hindi) made a big impact on behalf of the global Murdoch network, winning larger audiences in India than longer-established broadcasters such as CNN and BBC. Although Star News had the Star platform, the news was not produced in-house. NDTV provides all of the news content in both English and Hindi - including its presentation and packaging for Star. By this partnership, NDTV could reach the homes of affluent Indians through Star TV's platform, while Star could benefit from the gravitas of a serious news channel.

As part of the Star bouquet of channels, Star News remained dependent on its relationship with Murdoch and vulnerable to changes in Star's strategy. As the end of its contract with Star approached, NDTV considered a number of possibilities to broaden its appeal and its revenue. Star had already been downplaying NDTV's profile. Its contract with NDTV did not give Star editorial control, and Star's management were uneasy when India government criticised NDTV for its reporting of the Gujarat riots in 2002.

=== New channels ===
In 2003 With the end of its contract with Star, NDTV launches its own news channels in English (NDTV 24x7) and Hindi (NDTV India). Star TV was keen to renew NDTV's contract, but it was no longer willing to give it full editorial control. Star retains the Star News brand, but the channel continued only in Hindi. Media observers expected that NDTV would struggle to survive on its own. After much speculation about its future, it had announced a distribution partnership with Sony Entertainment Television's One World Alliance. This alliance with Sony gave NDTV a strong base from which to establish a new profile.

Star's decision after it ended its contract with NDTV to concentrate on Hindi news bulletins and to drop its English service is also a significant indicator of the balance between profitability and influence in the crowded Indian television news market. NDTV has been on a cost-cutting spree for several quarters, as it seeks to stay relevant in a competitive market. NDTV launches business news channel NDTV Profit. In 2026 NDTV 24x7 renames itself into simply NDTV.

== Distribution network ==
NDTV channels have an overseas audience among the Indian diaspora in the US, Canada, the UK, Asia Pacific, the Middle East and South Africa, thanks to deals with satellite operators, such as Sky and DirecTV. To accelerate the global push, NDTV formed a joint venture with a subsidiary of Kuala Lumpur's Astro All Asia Network, taking a 20% stake. In 2006, it launched Astro Awani, a Bahasa Indonesia-language news channel in Indonesia.

NDTV broadcasts in the UK on the Sky (Channel 509) and Virgin Media (Channel 621) platforms; in the USA on the Dish Network, Spectrum, Sling TV and Xfinity platform; in South Africa on DSTV; in Canada available via a partnership with the Asian Television Network; in Australia on the Vision Asia and Fetch TV (Under Taj Mahal Pack and Basic Pack) platforms; in Singapore on Singtel TV (between 2008 and 2011, available since 2015) and StarHub TV (since 2013) platform and in Sri Lanka on Dialog TV and Peo TV.

== Controversies ==
=== Prevention of Corruption Act case ===
The CBI had filed a criminal conspiracy case against NDTV managing director Prannoy Roy in 1998 for alleging fraud in Doordarshan upgrade. In July 2013, Roy and NDTV were cleared by the courts and found not to be guilty of all charges involving cases filed against Roy by the CBI under Section 120-B of the Indian Penal Code (IPC) for criminal conspiracy and under the Prevention of Corruption Act, 1988.

NDTV, through its foreign subsidiaries, is alleged to have violated Indian tax and corporate laws. NDTV has denied these allegations.

=== Radia tapes controversy ===
Radia tapes relate to telephonic conversations tapped by the Income Tax Department, which include the conversation of ex-NDTV journalist Barkha Dutt.

The transcripts of the tapes are referred to the lobbying activity against the reappointment of Dayanidhi Maran to the post of the union information technology and communications minister during the UPA's tenure at the Centre.

- Conversation with the journalist Barkha Dutt at 09:48 IST.
- In a later conversation at 10:47 IST, Barkha says that [while conveying the message to the Indian National Congress (ruling party at that time)] it was "not a problem" and that she would talk with Ghulam (Nabi Azad) (Indian politician and Congress leader).

=== The Sunday Guardian's allegations ===
The Sunday Guardian ran a story which exposed the NDTV's financial misdemeanours and malpractices in connivance with ICICI Bank. It provides details of how NDTV's major stakeholders raised funds by the misdeclaration of the value of shares in NDTV. NDTV has denied the allegations and the NDTV CEO replied to the Sunday Guardian along with the threat of "criminal defamation". On 5 June 2017, the house of Prannoy Roy was raided by the NIA and CBI.

=== Foreign Exchange Management Act violation ===
On 19 November 2015 the ED served a ₹2,030 crore (280 million USD) notice to NDTV for alleged violations under the Foreign Exchange Management Act, 1999, however the company said it has been advised that the allegations are not "legally tenable".

=== Income tax cases ===
The Income Tax Appellate Tribunal (ITAT) has upheld an income tax department finding that promoters of NDTV used their own shell companies to round-trip investments of ₹642 crore (90 million USD) during 2009–10, making them liable for the recovery of tax and penalty.

The Delhi bench of the Income Tax Appellate Tribunal which functioned under the Ministry of Law and Justice upheld the findings of the department held the company liable for the reassessment of taxation with penalty. According to the findings, the company had allegedly colluded with NBCUniversal, a subsidiary of the defunct General Electric in a complex money laundering scheme for evading the taxation of what was noted to be a relatively small amount of funds relative to the size of the companies.

=== Securities and Exchange Board of India violation ===
In September 2018, Roy and his wife Radhika were issued show cause notice by the Securities and Exchange Board of India for the violation of insider trading regulations through their company NDTV downplayed the notices stating they were seeking legal advice on the issue. Earlier that year, in the month March they were fined INR₹3 lakh each by the SEBI for disclosure lapses.

The Securities and Exchange Board of India also barred Prannoy Roy and his wife Radhika Roy from accessing the securities market for 2 years, after an investigation revealed that they concealed material information from shareholders regarding loan agreements and hence they cannot hold management positions at the NDTV board.

=== Central Bureau of Investigation case ===
- In 2017, the Central Bureau of Investigation (CBI) lodged a case against the company on allegations that it had defrauded the ICICI bank and the offices of the company and the residence of the founders, the Roys were raided by the bureau. The case was lodged on the basis of a complaint by a stockbroker Sanjay Dutt supported by the retracted Sunday Guardian article. It was noted that the ICICI bank itself considered the company to have returned the loan within an year and had not received any details of the case. The raids received condemnation and the CBI was accused of being under pressure from the government to act against the news broadcaster.
- In August 2019, the Central Bureau of Investigation filed a fresh case against Prannoy Roy, his wife Radhika Roy and former NDTV CEO Vikram Chanðra for violating the FDI rules and routing of tainted money of unknown public servants through shell firms.

== Awards ==
- Critics Award for Pioneering Work in Programming at the 1998 Screen Awards
- Best English News Channel of Asia in 2005 at the Asian Television Awards
- Best English News Channel in 2005 and 2006 at the Indian Television Academy Awards

== See also ==
- NDTV
- NDTV India
