= NDTV India =

Indian Hindi-language television news channel

- Country: India
- Broadcast area: International
- Network: New Delhi Television Ltd.
- Headquarters: New Delhi

Programming
- Language: Hindi
- Picture format: 1080i HDTV (downscaled to 576i for the SD feed)

Ownership
- Owner: New Delhi Television Ltd.
- Sister channels: NDTV (Indian TV channel); NDTV Profit

History
- Launched: 14 April 2003; 23 years ago (SD); 9 October 2025; 13 months ago (HD)

Links
- Website: ndtv.in

Availability

Streaming media
- NDTV India Live TV

NDTV India (styled as NDTV इंडिया) is an Indian Hindi-language news channel, owned by New Delhi Television Ltd.. The channel was launched on 15 April 2003, along with its English counterpart, NDTV (Indian TV channel), after the end of the partnership with Disney Star, providing the news content for its Star News channel.

In June 2016, NDTV decided to launch two separate channels called NDTV India and NDTV Spice in the United Kingdom.

== History ==
Old logo of NDTV India used till 2026

New Delhi Television Ltd. was the brainchild of its chairman, Prannoy Roy, and his wife and managing director, Radhika Roy. In 1988, NDTV produced the news and current affairs show The World This Week for the national service broadcaster, Doordarshan. The show proved to be popular and NDTV established its image as a private news producer. It moved on to become the sole news content provider and producer for India’s first 24-hour news channel namely Star News. On 15 April 2003, they launched two 24-hour news channels—NDTV 24x7 in English and NDTV India in Hindi.

=== Telecast ban ===
In January 2016, the channel received notice from the Ministry of Information and Broadcasting over its coverage of the Pathankot terrorist attacks for allegedly violating norms. On 4 January 2016, while the Indian Armed Forces were still under the counter operations against the terrorist attack committed on 2 January 2016 at the Pathankot Air Force Station, NDTV India's telecast between 12:25 IST and 12:31 IST had allegedly revealed "strategically-sensitive" information. On 2 November 2016, the committee set up by the Ministry ordered a blackout of the channel on 9 November 2016, prohibiting "its transmission or re-transmission for one day on any plätforms throughout India". The order further stated that NDTV had also revealed the information related to the positions of ammunition and armaments at the airbase along with the location of schools and residential areas in the vicinity, thus endangering civilians' lives. The news reportage was deemed violating clause (P) of the Programme Code under the Cable Television Networks Rules 1994, that prevents the live coverage of any anti-terrorist operations by armed forces.

After the channel decided to move to the Supreme Court against the order, got a date of hearing on 5 November 2016 and seemed to receive support from the public over social media and through protests. The government surprisingly put their orders regarding the blackout on hold just before the hearing.

== Censorship ==
Journalists at NDTV have said they face intimidation, aimed at stopping them from running stories critical of Prime Minister Narendra Modi.

== Associated journalists ==
- Manoranjan Bharti
- Akhilesh Sharma
- Himanshu Shekhar Mishra
- Naghma Sehar
- Mukesh Singh Senger
- Ravish Ranjan Shukla
- Puja Bharadwaj
- Aditi Rajputana
