= Adani Energy Solutions =

Electric power transmission company in India

Adani Energy Solutions Limited
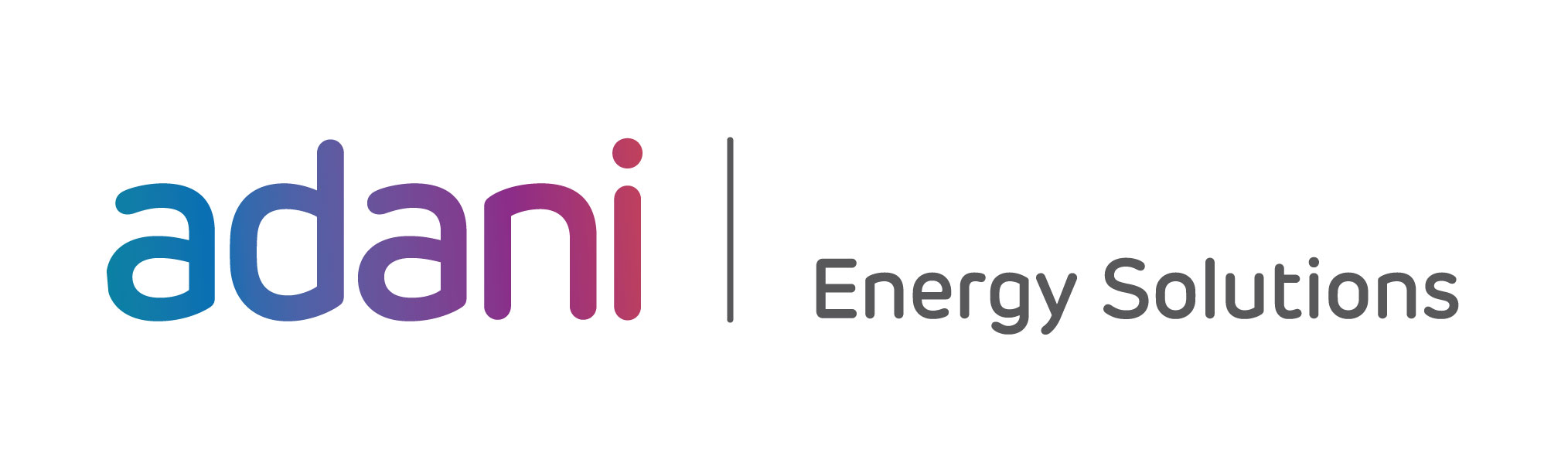
- Company type: Public
- Traded as: BSE: 539254; NSE: ADANIENSOL
- ISIN: INE931S01010
- Industry: Electric utility
- Founded: 9 December 2013
- Founder: Gautam Adani
- Headquarters: Shantigram, Khodiyar, Ahmedabad, India
- Key people: Gautam Adani (Chairman); Bimal Dayal (CEO)
- Products: Electricity transmission and distribution
- Revenue: ▲₹24,447 crore (US$2.6 billion) (FY 2024-25)
- Operating income: ▲₹7,746 crore (US$810 million) (FY 2024-25)
- Net income: ▲₹2,427 crore (US$250 million) (FY 2024-25)
- Total assets: ▲₹58,579 crore (US$6.1 billion) (2024)
- Total equity: ▲₹13,703 crore (US$1.4 billion) (2024)
- Number of employees: 4,959 (2024)
- Parent: Adani Group
- Subsidiaries: Adani Electricity Mumbai Limited
- Website: www.adanienergysolutions.com

Adani Energy Solutions Ltd, formerly known as Adani Transmission Ltd, is an electric power transmission and distribution company headquartered in Ahmedabad. As of April 2025, the company operates a cumulative transmission network of 26,696 circuit kilometers and is one of the largest private sector power transmission companies operating in India.

== History ==
Adani Transmission was founded by Gautam Adani in December 2015 after separating the decade-old transmission business from Adani Enterprises. At the time of the founding, the company became the primary custodian for more than 3800 circuit kilometers of transmission lines originating from the Mundra Thermal Power Station, connecting Mundra–Dehgam, Mundra–Mohindergarh and Tirora–Warora.

In July 2023, the company was renamed to Adani Energy Solutions to better reflect its suite of products and services.

=== Mergers and acquisitions ===
In 2015, ATL acquired three wholly owned subsidiaries of PFC Consulting, which itself is a subsidiary of Power Finance Corporation – the Chhattisgarh-WR transmission line, Sipat transmission line connecting with Sipat Thermal Power Station and Raipur-Rajnandgaon-Warora transmission line.

In 2016, ATL further acquired the GMR Group's transmission assets in the state of Rajasthan — the Maru Transmission Services Ltd (MTSL) and Aaravalli Transmission Services Ltd (ATSL). In the same year, the company also acquired Reliance Infrastructure's transmission assets of the Western Region System Strengthening Scheme (WRSSS).

In December 2017, the company obtained a share purchase agreement (SPA) for the acquisition of the Mumbai Generation Transmission & Distribution (GTD) business from Reliance Infrastructure. In March 2018, the shareholders of Reliance Infrastructure approved the sale of its power business for Rs. 18,800 crore to Adani Transmission Limited. This resulted in the founding of Adani Mumbai Electricity Limited, a 100% wholly owned subsidiary of ATL which currently serves more than 3 million consumers across a license area of approximately 400 square kilometers in the city of Mumbai.

In February 2019, ATL acquired KEC International's Bikaner-Sikar transmission asset in Rajasthan. In September of the same year, the company acquired PFC Consulting's Bikaner-Khetri transmission project in Rajasthan.

In July 2020, the company signed definitive agreements with Kalpataru Power Transmission (KPTL) for acquiring Alipurduar Transmission. adding 650 circuit kilometers in its network from the state of Bihar and West Bengal.

In May 2024, the company announced its acquisition of Essar's Mahan-Sipat transmission assets for Rs. 1,900 crore through its wholly owned subsidiary Adani Transmission Step Two (ATST). This move will consolidate its presence in Central India with 4 operating assets of 3373 ckt km in the region

=== Allegations of stock manipulation ===
In January 2023, Hindenburg Research published the findings of a two-year investigation claiming that Adani had engaged in market manipulation and accounting malpractices; Hindenburg also disclosed that it was holding short positions on Adani Group companies. Bonds and shares of companies associated with Adani experienced a decline in value after the accusations. Adani denied the fraud allegations as unfounded and ill intentioned.
