= Aircraft maintenance in India =

The aircraft maintenance industry in India was worth US$800 million in 2011 and is expected to grow to over US$1.5 billion by 2020. However, currently India constitutes 1 percent of the global maintenance, repair, and operations (MRO) market, worth US$45 billion.

The measured steps that the Indian government has taken in moving towards the open sky policy, like increases in military, civil and business aircraft fleet in the country, the growing preference for air travel by India's largely underserved middle class, and the focus by industry to optimise cost of aircraft operations, provides a strong foundation for the Indian MRO industry to strengthen its capability to meet global standards of excellence.

Operating an MRO depends on manpower. It also requires continuous investment in tooling, certification from safety regulators such as the Federal Aviation Administration (FAA) and the European Aviation Safety Agency (EASA) and global OEMs, in addition to certification from the local regulator in order to stay relevant in today's competitive global environment.

== Segments ==
The four segments are:

1. Airframe maintenance.
2. Engine maintenance, constitute 50% to 55% of the work in value . Engine overhauling and component maintenance is considered the high return in income.
3. Components maintenance has second highest share in revenue.
4. Weekly checks (termed as line maintenance).

Mumbai, Delhi, Nagpur, Kolkata, Thiruvananthapuram and Hyderabad has AIESL Overhaul facilities.

=== Commercial aviation ===
Airlines in India spend about 13–15 percent of their revenues towards maintenance, the second-highest cost item for airlines after fuel. Generally airlines carry on-tarmac inspections (A and B checks) in-house and work with third-party MROs for engine, heavy maintenance (C and D checks) and modifications. Almost all airline MRO infrastructure in India is captive (largely with Air India) with only one fully operational independent third-party provider MRO, Air Works, with an EASA-certified facility in Hosur, near Bengaluru. Air Works provides heavy maintenance capability for Airbus A320, ATR 42/72 and Boeing 737/NG family of aircraft. GMR has set up in partnership with MAS an operational facility meeting EASA standards at Hyderabad.

Until recently, in the absence of quality infrastructure, airlines carried out maintenance outside India at the nearest available MRO location (South East Asia, Middle East or Europe) incurring a ferry flight, logistics costs and engine and component hours. Having the flexibility to get the aircraft serviced in India, at a local MRO with EASA-approved facilities, results in 30–40% saving in aircraft maintenance costs for an airline, despite the tax regime on import of spares into the country making them 30% more expensive as compared to international MROs. In addition to taxation, the other key impediment to growth of airline MRO capacity in India is the lack of availability of hangar space at key international airports. This limits the ability of MROs to tap into the larger potential market of aircraft operating within 5–6 hours of flying distance from India.

=== Business aviation ===
Private operators and NSOP (non-scheduled operators permit) holders are required by DGCA (Directorate General of Civil Aviation) to set up a CAR 145 approved maintenance shop or work with a DGCA approved third-party MRO. Most private operators and NSOP holders prefer the outsourced model for line maintenance (on-tarmac checks) and use OEM/DGCA approved facilities for engine, heavy maintenance and modifications on their aircraft.

The Indian business aviation market is complex from a maintenance perspective as it has over 60 different aircraft types operating in a total market of about 350 aircraft (business jets, turboprops and helicopters). Each individual type requires trained technical manpower, tooling, and approvals from regulator as well as the OEM to enable an MRO to offer world-class maintenance services. Creation of this infrastructure requires a level of investment (both initial and recurring) which most MROs do not find economically viable to support. Therefore, the industry is highly fragmented, with one of the largest player in the market Air Works (with approvals on over 50 different types from DGCA at 15 locations in India and OEM certification from Agusta Westland, Bell, Bombardier, Dassault, Embraer, Garmin, Gulfstream, Hawker Beechcraft, Honeywell and Rockwell Collins) commanding a 30% market share and Indamer Aviation Pvt. Ltd, (with approvals on over 28 different aircraft from DGCA at 14 locations across India) commanding 27% of the market share.

A significant percentage of the business aviation fleet in India gets heavy maintenance and modifications done at OEM approved facilities in Europe, UK and the US. This trend, though, is shifting as established players in India are upgrading their heavy maintenance capability and providing customers with an option to reduce turnaround times and costs of aircraft maintenance. A key inflection point for this segment of the industry will be as MRO's in India upgrade their facilities to global certification such as EASA in addition to OEM certification as that will enable customers to access globally certified quality of maintenance services locally at their operating base.

The other key challenge which is faced by the industry is non availability of spare parts in the region which leads to frequent grounding of aircraft for lack of spares. This is driven by a lack of OEM support for the Indian market (which is gradually changing with growth in the market) and the custom duty regime which discourages MROs from stocking parts on behalf of customers. If an NSOP holder imports parts for his aircraft, it is exempt from duty, whereas, if an MRO were to provide him this facility, the customer will be liable to pay customs duty as well as service tax. On the suggestions and white paper published by Ravi Menon, founding family member of Air Works, custom tariff has been amended to exempt custom duty on the Aircraft spare parts imported by Indian MROs for use on aircraft maintained by them.

=== Defence ===
Defence MRO in India is largely captive with the Army, Navy and Air Force supported to an extent by HAL (Hindustan Aeronautics Limited). The Directorate General of Civil Aviation for Dornier 228 & Avro 748 aircraft MRO for civil operators has recently certified Hindustan Aeronautics Limiteds Transport Division in Kanpur (Central India). However, there is growing awareness within the Indian Defence establishment on the value of outsourcing non-core maintenance activities to third party operators.

The revised Defence Procurement Procedure (DPP) outlines key changes which provides establishment of public private partnerships as well as qualification of MRO under offset guidelines which will further the setup of MRO capabilities in country. With an estimated spend of US$20 billion on military aircraft by India over the coming 5–7 years, India will see significant capability being developed in country to support MRO activity for these aircraft.

=== Airport infrastructure ===
With the increase in traffic for both passenger & cargo aviation services in India, the government has put in place a program for directing investments in the Airport infrastructure – through both internal resource mobilization, as well as through private sector participation in modernizing specific airports. This growth of recent past was mainly fuelled by a policy of 'open sky' for domestic sector. This is besides the fact that a generally favourable macro-economic situation in the country was, by itself, a big catalyst for the growth. Steps have been taken for upgrading of airports infrastructure to keep pace with the traffic growth. This has led to capacity creation and better service standards at most of the major airports. In the past five years, almost 60 of the 90 odd operational airports are presently undergoing extensive modernization and upgradation work.

The two biggest airports in India, Delhi and Mumbai, have been upgraded at an estimated investment of about Rs. 10,000 crores each. Two new Greenfield airports at Hyderabad and Bangalore have also been made operational. Airport Council International has adjudged Rajiv Gandhi International Airport, Shamshabad near Hyderabad as the 'World's Best Airport' for the Airport Service Quality amongst the airports handling 5-15 million passengers category for the year 2009. In order to encourage investment in airport infrastructure, Government of India promulgated a new policy for Greenfield airports which envisage that new airports should preferably be constructed through concessions. So far, Government of India has accorded 'in-principle' approval for setting up of 12 Greenfield airports in the country.

However, all these developments in the airport infrastructure have not been able to support the growth of the MRO business as required by the industry. Lease of hangar space in to MROs at various airports in India is a complex issue. Where land is available to set up the facility, customs and immigration clearance is not available, and where customs and immigration clearance is available, there is just no space.

== Major players ==
The eight major players in the Indian MRO market are:

1. AIESL (Air India Engineering Services Ltd).
2. Air Works (Air Works India (Engineering) Pvt. Ltd).
3. Indamer Private Limited (Indamer Aviation Pvt. Ltd).
4. Deccan Charter (Deccan Charters Limited).
5. Taj Air (Taj Air).
6. Bird ExecuJet (Bird ExecuJet).
7. GMR Aero Technic Limited (GMR Aero Technic Ltd.).
8. Max MRO Private Limited (Max MRO Pvt Ltd).
9. JCETK Pvt Ltd

=== MRO Association of India ===
A professional body was formed on June 8, 2011, to lobby with the concerned departments of the government for a level playing field for the Indian MRO players. This body, MRO Association of India has been able to work with the MoCA to formulate a draft Policy on MRO; and get some long-term reforms enacted such as the exemption of basic customs duty on aircraft spares and extending the duty-free period for spares consumption from three months to one year; rolling back Gross Turnover Tax charged by airport to MRO from 36% to 13%; the Maharashtra State Government exempting VAT @ 12.5% on spare parts are some of the positive steps initiated so far among others.

== Industry outlook ==
The third-party MRO industry in India has been in the past dominated by small and medium enterprises with limited participation by global players. This trend is gradually changing as the market size for MRO is becoming significant and is attracting interest from globally established players such as Boeing and EADS. At the same time, established Indian players such as Air Works are taking the necessary steps to acquire or partner with global companies to establish capabilities in specific parts of the MRO value chain.

The industry does have the credibility to attract MRO work not only from India but also South East Asia, Middle East and Eastern Europe. The key issue which the government will need to address is ensuring that adequate infrastructure is made available in a timely and easy to access manner for the industry and ensure that it creates a level playing environment for Indian MROs when they compete with their global peers to attract business into the country. The government must also push for the domestic MRO companies to work towards achieving globally recognized certifications. The fleet of various airlines includes a mix of directly purchased aircraft and aircraft that are leased. Since most of the leasing companies are either European or American it is imperative for the Indian MRO companies to have either global certifications such as EASA so as to be able to perform MRO activities.

Table 1: The table below provides a simple comparison of costs of a C1 check on a Boeing 737 NG aircraft between India and other international locations.

Cost Heads	Middle East/South East Asia	India
Labor rate (USD/hr)	50	35
Labor cost (USD)	64,000	57,000
Parts (USD)	15,000	20,000
Ferry time (hrs)	10	2
Ferry cost (USD)	35,000	7,000
Total cost (USD)	114,000	84,007

== See also ==
Aviation in India
