= Adani Group =

Indian multinational conglomerate private company

- Type: Corporate group
- Industry: Conglomerate
- Founded: 20 July 1988; 38 years ago
- Founder: Gautam Adani
- Headquarters: Ahmedabad, Gujarat, India
- Area served: Worldwide
- Key people: Gautam Adani (chairman)
- Services: Port management; Electric power; Mining; Renewable energy; Airport operations; Oil and gas; Food processing; Infrastructure
- Revenue: ▲₹3.09 lakh crore (US$33 billion) (2024)
- Net income: ▲₹41,263 crore (US$4.4 billion) (2024)
- Number of employees: ~36,000 (2024)
- Subsidiaries: Adani Enterprises; Adani Ports & SEZ; Adani Green Energy; Adani Power; Adani Energy Solutions; Adani Total Gas; Adani Defence and Aerospace; Adani University; Ambuja Cements; ACC; NDTV; Jaiprakash Associates; North Queensland Export Terminal; Adani Foundation
- Website: adani.com

Adani Group (Hindi: [əd̪aːniː], Gujarati: [əd̪aɳiː]) is an Indian multinational conglomerate, headquartered in Ahmedabad. Founded by Gautam Adani in 1988 as a commodity trading business, the Group's businesses include sea and airport management, electricity generation and transmission, mining, natural gas, food, weapons, and infrastructure. It is particularly active in metal commodity exchange. More than 60% of its revenue is derived from coal-related businesses.

Noted for its close association with the ruling Bharatiya Janata Party, Adani was the largest Indian conglomerate as of 2022 with a US$206 billion market capitalisation, surpassing Tata Group. It lost more than $104 billion in value after fraud and market manipulation allegations by short-seller firm Hindenburg Research. In May 2024, the Adani Group's market capitalisation returned to over $200 billion after the Supreme Court directed the Securities and Exchange Board of India (SEBI) to expedite its investigation.

The Adani Group has also attracted other controversies due to reports suggesting stock manipulation, accounting irregularities, exporting military drones to Israel during the Gaza genocide, political corruption, cronyism, tax evasion, environmental damage, suing journalists and money laundering.

== History ==
Adani Exports Limited started as a commodity trading company in 1988 and expanded into importing and exporting multiple commodities. With a capital of ₹5 lakhs, the company was established as a partnership firm with the flagship company Adani Enterprises, previously Adani Exports. In 1990, the Adani Group developed its own port in Mundra to provide a base for its trading operations. It began construction at Mundra in 1995. In 1998, it became the top net foreign exchange earner for India Inc. The company began coal trading in 1999, followed by a joint venture in edible oil refining in 2000 with the formation of Adani Wilmar.

Adani handled 4 Mt of cargo at Mundra in 2002, becoming the largest private port in India. Later in 2006, the company became the largest coal importer in India with 11 Mt of coal handling. The company expanded its business in 2008, purchasing Bunyu Mine in Indonesia which has 180 Mt of coal reserves. In 2009 the firm began generating 330 MW of thermal power. It also built an edible oil refining capacity in India of 2.2 Mt per annum.

In 2010, Adani group with help of Petronet LNG will set up a solid cargo port through a Joint Venture company namely Adani Petronet (Dahej) Port Private Ltd., has already commenced its Phase 1 operations from August 2010 at Dahej Port. solid cargo port terminal would have facilities to import/export bulk products like coal, steel and fertiliser. PLL has 26% equity in this JV.

The Adani group became India's largest private coal mining company after Adani Enterprises won the Orissa mine rights in 2010. Operations at the Port of Dahej commenced in 2011 and its capacity subsequently grew to 20 Mt. The company also bought Galilee Basin mine in Australia with 10.4 gigatonnes (Gt) of coal reserves. More than 60 per cent of the Adani Group's revenue is derived from coal-related businesses.

In 2011, the Adani group also bought Abbot Point port in Australia with 50 Mt of handling capacity. It commissioned India's largest solar power plant with a capacity 40 MW. As the firm achieved 3,960 MW capacity, it became the largest private sector thermal power producer in India. In 2012 The company shifted its focus on three business clusters – resources, logistics and energy.

Adani Power emerged as India's largest private power producer in 2014. Adani Power's total installed capacity then stood at 9,280 MW. On 16 May of the same year, Adani Ports acquired Dhamra Port on East coast of India for ₹5,500 crore (equivalent to ₹96 billion or US$1.0 billion in 2026). Dhamra Port was a 50:50 joint venture between Tata Steel and L&T Infrastructure Development Projects, which has been acquired by Adani Ports. The port began operations in May 2011 and handled a total cargo of 14.3 Mt in 2013–14. With the acquisition of Dhamra Port, the group is planning to increase its capacity to over 200 Mt by 2020.

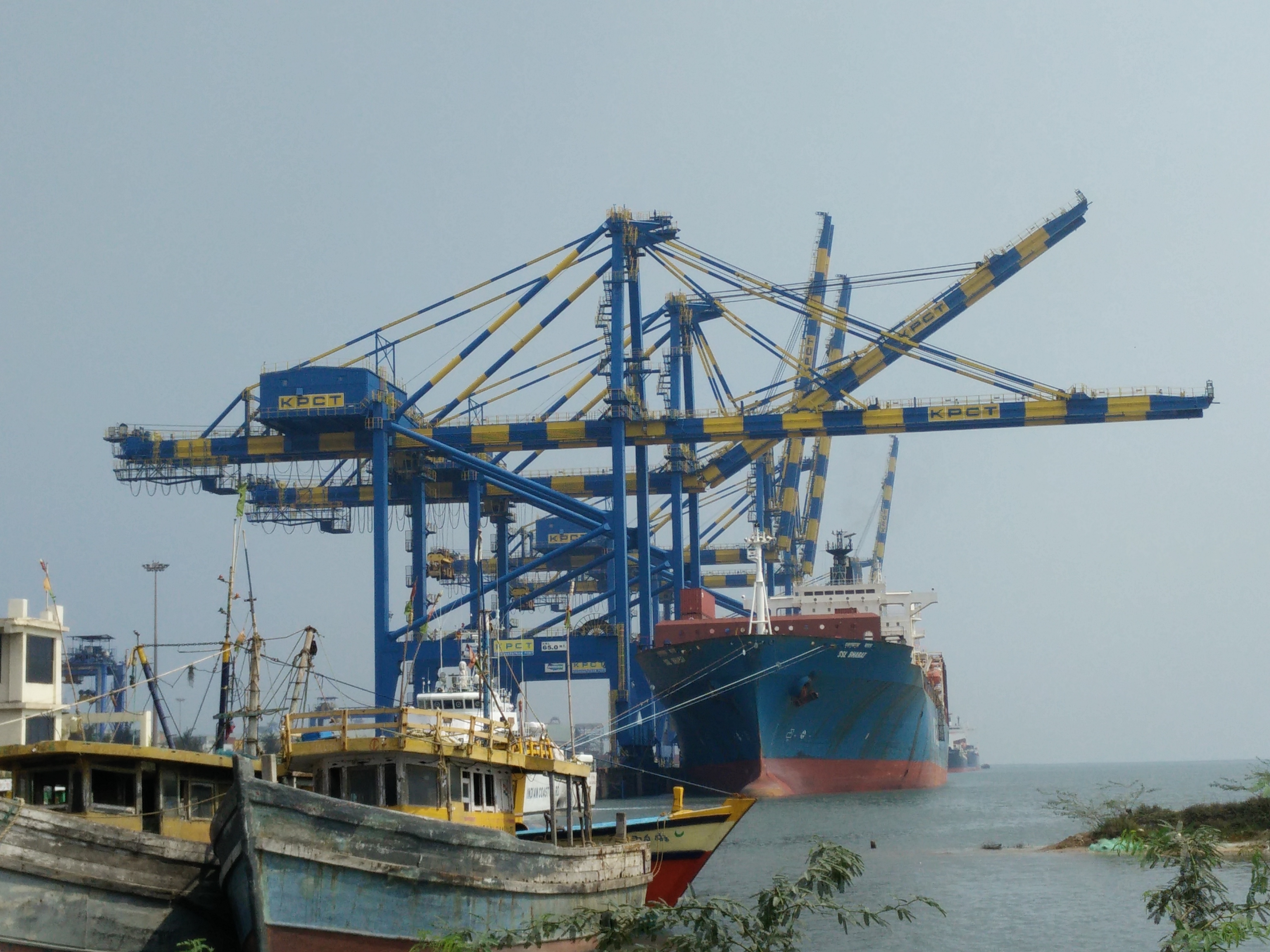
Krishnapatnam Port in Andhra Pradesh

In 2015, the Adani Group's Adani Renewable Energy Park signed a pact with the Rajasthan Government for a 50:50 joint venture to set up India's largest solar park with a capacity of 10,000 MW. In November 2015, the Adani group began construction at the port in Vizhinjam, Kerala.

Adani Aero Defence signed a pact with the Israeli arms manufacturer, Elbit-ISTAR, and Alpha Design Technologies to work in the field of Unmanned Aircraft Systems (UAS) in India in 2016. In April, Adani Enterprises secured approval from the Government of Gujarat to begin work on building a solar power equipment plant. In September, Adani Green Energy (Tamil Nadu), the renewable wing of the Adani Group, began operations in Kamuthi in Ramanathapuram, Tamil Nadu with a capacity of 648 MW at an estimated cost of ₹4,550 crore (equivalent to ₹71 billion or US$760 million in 2026). In the same month, the Adani Group inaugurated a 648 MW single-location solar power plant. It was the world's largest solar power plant at the time it was set up.

On 22 December 2017, the Adani Group acquired the power arm of Reliance Infrastructure for ₹18,800 crore (US$2.89 billion).

In October 2019, French oil and gas company TotalEnergies bought a 37.4% stake in Adani Gas for ₹6,155 crore (US$874.04 million) and obtained joint control of the company. Total also invested US$510 million in a subsidiary of Adani Green Energy in February 2020.

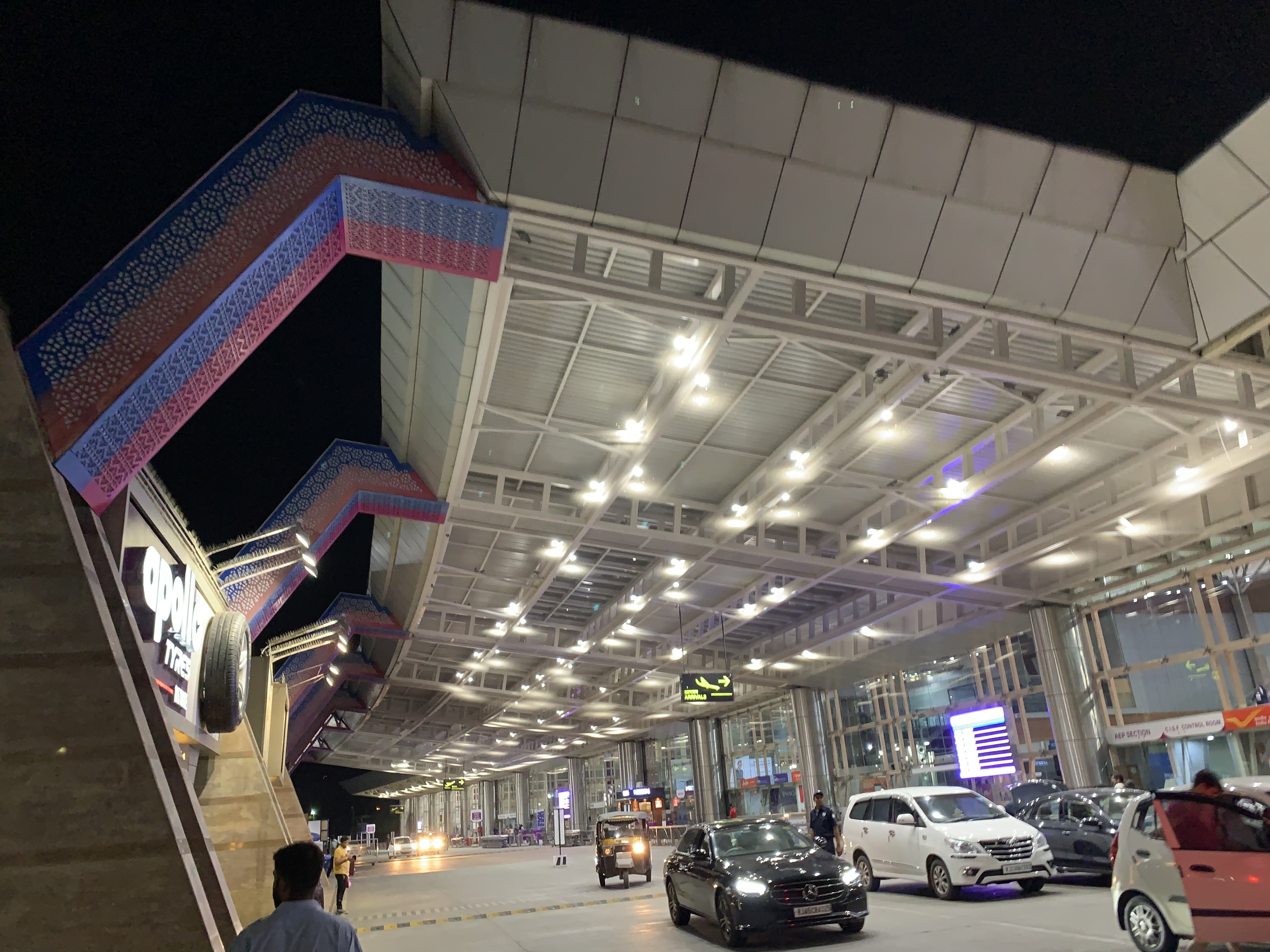
Jaipur International Airport

In August 2020, Adani Group obtained a majority stake in Mumbai and Navi Mumbai airports after entering a debt acquisition agreement with GVK Group. Through a concession agreement with the Airports Authority of India, Adani Group also obtained a 50-year lease on Ahmedabad, Guwahati, Jaipur, Lucknow, Mangalore and Thiruvananthapuram airports.

In March 2021, Adani Welspun Exploration Limited, a 65-35 oil and gas exploration partnership with Welspun Enterprises, discovered a gas reservoir spread across 714.6 km^{2} (275.9 mi^{2}) off the coast of Mumbai.

In May 2021, Adani Green Energy acquired SB Energy, a joint venture of SoftBank Group and Bharti Enterprises, for US$3.5 billion.

In May 2022, the Adani Group acquired Ambuja Cements and ACC for $10.5 billion. The deal will make the Adani Group the second largest cement maker in India.

In May 2022, UAE-based conglomerate International Holding Company (IHC), headed by Syed Basar Shueb, invested US$2 billion in three Adani Group companies, namely Adani Green Energy, Adani Transmission and Adani Enterprises. In June 2022, TotalEnergies acquired a 25% stake in Adani New Industries, the newly formed green hydrogen subsidiary of Adani Enterprises, for US$12.5 billion.

In May 2025, Adani Group abruptly ended its partnership with China-based lounge provider DragonPass, days after announcing it, stating DragonPass users would no longer access Adani airport lounges, with no impact on other customers.

== Criticism ==
=== Coal mining in Australia ===
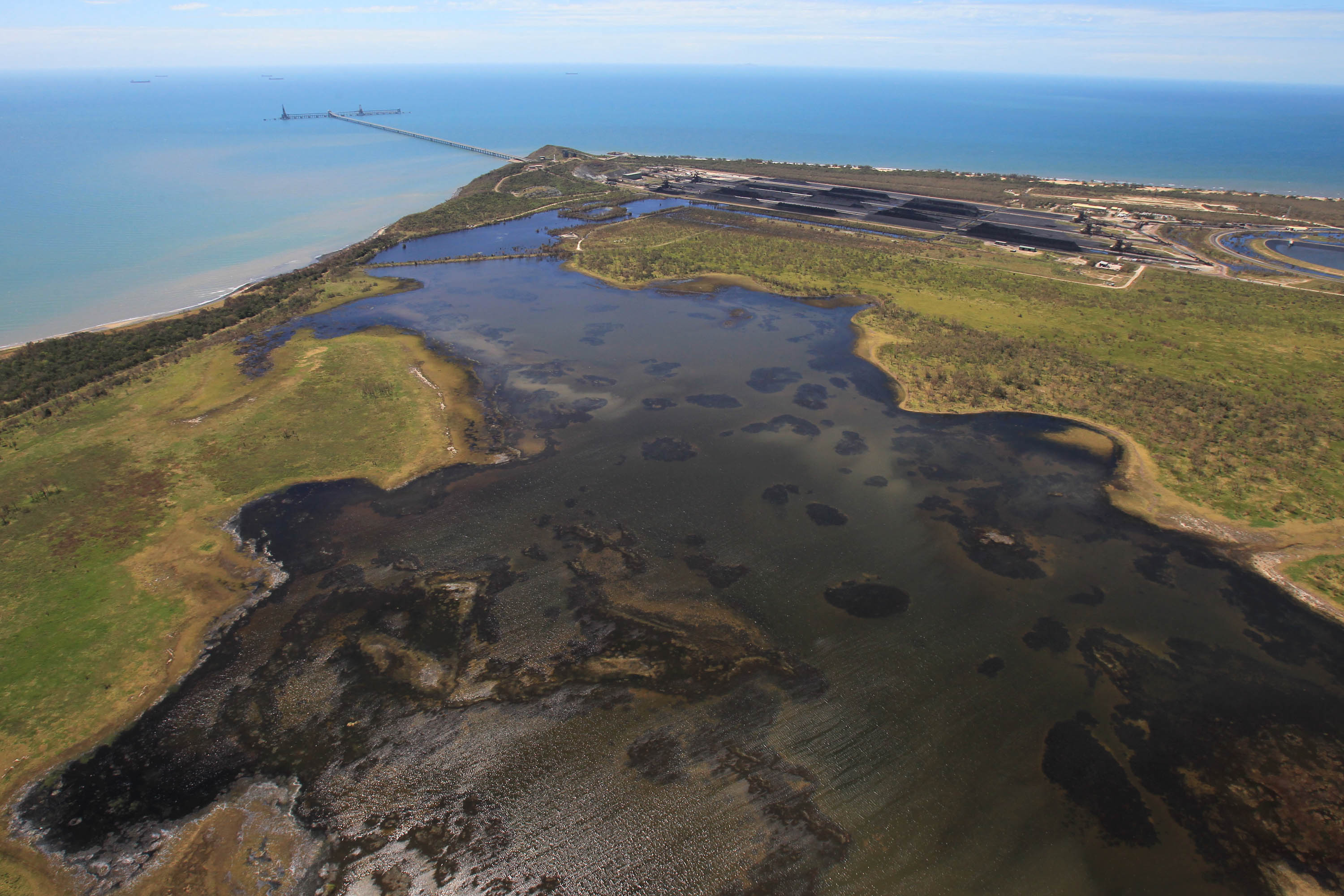
Coal spill at Abbot Point, Australia, after Cyclone Debbie in 2017

The Adani Group launched in 2014, with the support of the Australian and Queensland Governments, a mining and rail project, the Carmichael coal mine, in Queensland's Galilee Basin, for $21.5 billion over the life of the project, i.e. 60 years. Its annual capacity would be 10 Mt of thermal coal.

In response to pressure by environmental activists, some international banks refused to finance it. The mine has drawn criticism for its environmental impacts on the Great Barrier Reef, water usage, and carbon emissions, leading to a campaign known as Stop Adani, which put pressure on the Big Four banks in Australia not to finance the mine. In November 2018, Adani Australia announced that the Carmichael project would be 100% financed by Adani Group resources.

In 2015, the then-head of Adani's Australian mining division came under scrutiny due to his association with a mining pollution incident in Zambia, sparking renewed concerns about Adani's suitability to manage the Carmichael coal mine. According to a collaborative report from Environmental Justice Australia, Jeyakumar Janakaraj held significant positions at a mining company that faced criminal charges related to the contamination of the Kafue River in Zambia. This occurred before he assumed leadership role of Adani's operations in Australia. Specifically, Janakaraj served as the operations director at Konkola Copper Mines in 2010, when the company faced legal charges concerning the discharge of hazardous wastewater into the river. However, the Australian Government characterised Adani's omission of Janakaraj's involvement in the African pollution incident as a "mistake." Although, under section 489 of Australia's Environment Protection and Biodiversity Conservation Act 1999, presenting inaccurate or deceptive information could potentially constitute an offence, the federal government opted not to pursue any legal action against Adani.

The Australian Government has been taken to the Federal Court of Australia by the Australian Conservation Foundation twice, once in 2018 and once in March 2020 (still ongoing as of September 2020), relating to its contravention and alleged contravention of the Environment Protection and Biodiversity Conservation Act 1999 with respect to the impact of the Carmichael mine on groundwater and the country's water resources. In July 2019, the project received its final approvals from the government, and construction of the mine commenced.

In 2020, Adani Mining changed its name to Bravus Mining and Resources.

On 29 December 2021, Bravus announced that the first shipment of high-quality coal from the Carmichael mine had been assembled at the North Queensland Export Terminal (NQXT) in Bowen ready for export as planned.

=== Cronyism ===
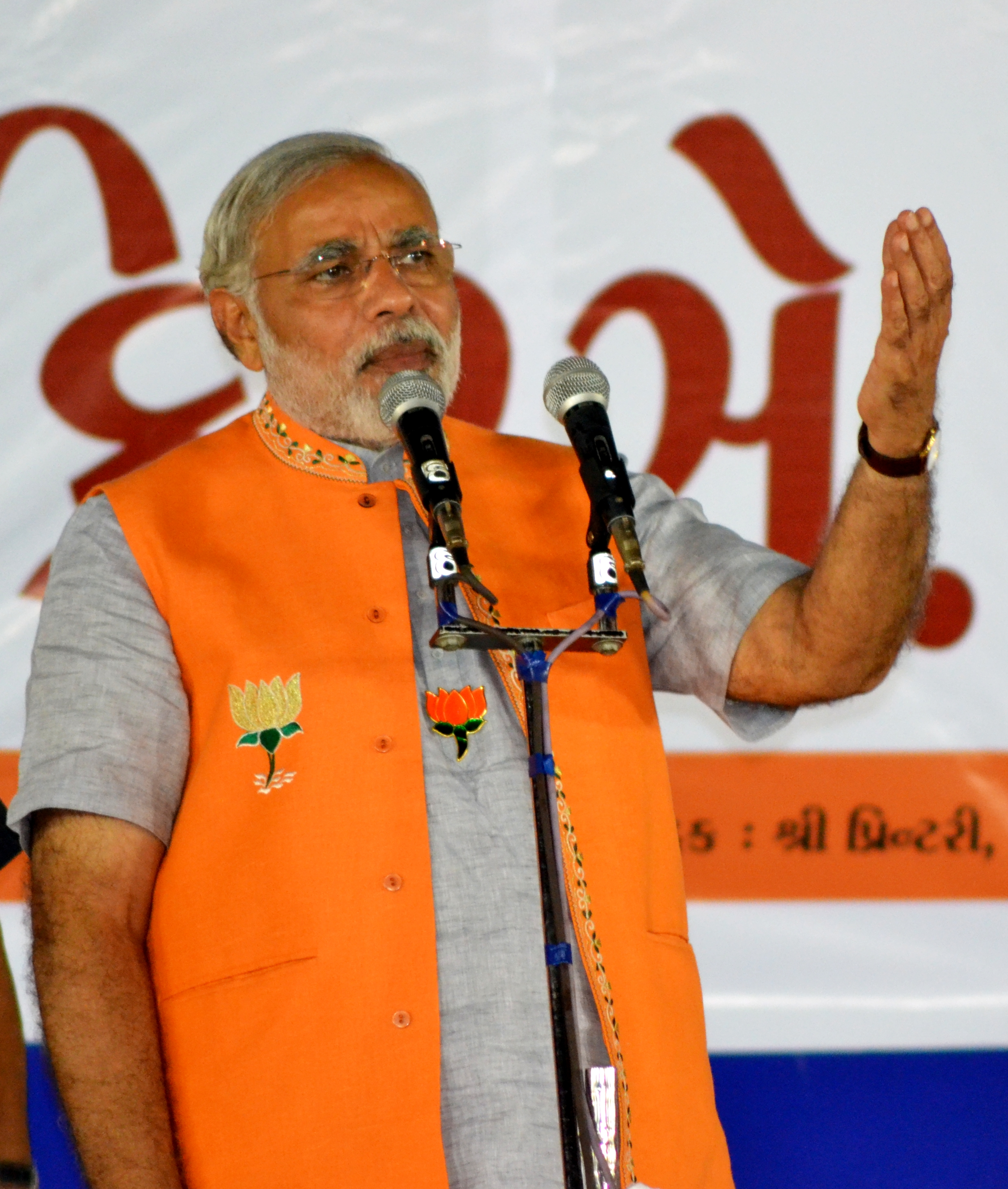
Narendra Modi in 2012

Chairman and MD Gautam Adani has been described as being close to former Chief Minister of Gujarat and Indian Prime Minister Narendra Modi and his ruling Bharatiya Janata Party (BJP). This has led to allegations of cronyism as his firms have won many Indian energy and infrastructure government contracts. In 2012, an Indian government audit accused Modi of giving low cost fuel from a Gujarat state-run gas company to the Adani group and other companies. In Jharkhand, the BJP-led state government made an exception to its energy policy for Adani's Godda power plant. Both the Adani Group and Modi's government have denied allegations of cronyism.

The Forbes Asia noted that Adani Group has over the years leased almost 7,350 hectares of land from the government for the amount as small as " one U.S. cent a square meter (the rate maxed out at 45 cents a square meter). He in turn has sublet this land to other companies, including state-owned Indian Oil Co., for as much as $11 a square meter". Between 2005 and 2007, Adani group acquired around 1200 hectares of land meant for grazing (gauchar) from the villagers for Adani SEZ. In Kutch, Adani group acquired 930,770 square meters of land from the villagers for 19 cents per square meter for its power plant leading to significant environmental damage. Villagers living in Adani SEZ alleged that the land was signed off by village chiefs without their knowledge. Adani group's subsidiary, Adani Ports & SEZ currently operates 15 ports across all Indian states. The Adani group controls seven airports in India, six of which were acquired for 50 years in a bid after an alleged change of rules by the Modi government that had disallowed the group from bidding.

Most Adani Group projects outside of India were announced after Narendra Modi's visits to said countries or meetings with their heads of state. In 2021, after a meeting with Modi, Sri Lankan President Gotabaya Rajapaksa told an official from the electricity board that Modi had pressured him to transfer a wind energy project to the Adani Group. After Modi's visit to Bangladesh, the Bangladeshi government under Sheikh Hasina signed a deal with the Adani Group to import electricity from Jharkhand. The opposition later argued that the deal was signed under pressure from the Modi government. The deal is currently under scrutiny of Bangladesh's interim government. A report by The Washington Post revealed that in May 2025, India’s state insurer LIC India proposed investing $3.9 billion in Adani shares. Subsequently, LIC invested $585 million in Adani Ports when the company needed to pay off its existing debt. This move highlighted Adani’s influence within India’s Modi government and was criticized as a misuse of public funds.

=== Leverage ===
The company's corporate debt totalled $30 billion in 2022. In August 2022, CreditSights, a unit of Fitch Ratings, warned that Adani's recent aggressive expansion had hurt the group's cash flow and credit metrics. It also stated that a potential "worst-case scenario" could lead the group to end up in a debt trap and a potential default. The CreditSights report garnered significant attention for its dire assessment of Adani's "deeply overleveraged" book; after outreach by Adani, CreditSights softened its language but kept its main conclusion.

=== Stock market rigging ===
In 2007, the Securities and Exchange Board of India (SEBI) prohibited multiple Adani companies from engaging in the purchase or sale of securities for a period of two years. This action was taken due to their involvement in a manipulation scheme that occurred between 1999 and 2001 to artificially influence stock prices. This manipulation was carried out through entities overseen by Ketan Parekh, the stockbroker who was the main accused in India's biggest stock market scandal. After paying a fine of $140,000, the companies were eventually permitted to recommence their trading activities.

=== Allegations of bid rigging ===
In March 2023, Adani group won a bid for the coal block North West of Madheri, where the only other bidder was Cavill Mining Private Limited, a minimum of two bidders are required for the first time auction of a commercial mine. According to an investigation by Scroll.in, Cavill Mining Private Limited is the main promoter of Adicorp Enterprises. Adicorp Enterprises has also been alleged by Hindenburg to have funnelled funds between Adani companies. This has raised concerns of bid rigging and collusion. Adani group also faced accusations of bid-rigging by the Indian National Congress after winning a contract to supply 6,600 MW of electricity to Maharashtra.

=== Tax evasion ===
On 27 February 2010, Central Bureau of Investigation arrested Rajesh Adani, managing director of Adani Enterprises Ltd., on charges of custom duty evasion amounting to ₹80 lakh.

Paranjoy Guha Thakurta, an Indian journalist working for the Economic and Political Weekly, co-authored an article about the Adani Group's tax evasion following which Adani Power sent a legal notice to the Economic and Political Weekly. Fearing an expensive lawsuit by one of India's biggest corporate houses EPW then decided to take down the article, prompting Paranjoy Guha Thakurta's resignation. In August 2017, Indian customs alleged the Adani Group was diverting millions of funds from the company's books to Adani family tax havens overseas. Adani was accused of using a Dubai shell company to divert the funds. The details of a $235 million diversion were obtained and published by The Guardian. In 2014, the Directorate of Revenue Intelligence (DRI) mapped out a complex money trail from India through South Korea and Dubai, and eventually to an offshore company in Mauritius allegedly owned by Vinod Shantilal Adani, the older brother of Gautam Adani. Same year, DRI forwarded a letter to the then SEBI chairperson,U. K. Sinha, along with a CD containing evidence suggesting the improper diversion of Rs. 2,323 crore. Additionally, they provided two investigative notes, cautioning that the group might be involved in manipulating the stock market through funds allegedly siphoned off using the strategy of overvaluing power equipment imports. However, SEBI did not publicly acknowledge the receipt of this letter and the accompanying evidence from DRI until September 2023, when it was disclosed before the Supreme Court of India.

Between December 2021 and November 2023, Swiss authorities froze a total of $310 million in five different accounts linked to Adani group following investigations into money laundering.

On October 7 2025, Reuters reported that India’s DRI initiated an investigation into Adani Defence in March 2025 over alleged customs duty evasion totaling approximately ₹77 crore (US$8.2 million). According to two government sources and a document reviewed by Reuters, the case concerns the company’s alleged misclassification of certain missile components as exempt from import duties and taxes.

=== Evasion of Customs Duty ===
In October 2025, the Supreme Court of India issued a notice to Adani Enterprises while hearing a plea by the Customs Department, which alleged that the company had imported gold and silver without paying tariffs by using duty-free credit entitlement certificates issued by the Directorate General of Foreign Trade.

=== Corporate governance issue ===
According to Bloomberg News, the group has been found to be maintaining dubious business relations with an engineering contracting firm, Howe Engineering Projects. This firm acquired the engineering business of PMC Project in 2016. In the past, PMC Projects, an Adani contractor, was accused of inflating the value of imported power and infrastructure goods by nearly ₹1,500 crore. Howe, now a separate entity, continues to work as an Adani contractor (just like PMC Projects) for major ports and railway lines being built in India. Deloitte raised concerns in May 2023 about payments made by Adani's ports company to Howe, unable to determine whether Howe should be considered a related party. Also, Adani Group had not publicly disclosed these payments until Deloitte highlighted them.

=== Stock manipulation and accounting fraud allegations ===
In January 2023, Hindenburg Research published the findings of a two-year investigation alleging that Adani had engaged in market manipulation and accounting malpractices. The report accused Adani of pulling "the largest con in corporate history" and "brazen stock manipulation and accounting fraud scheme over the course of decades". Hindenburg also disclosed that it was holding short positions on Adani Group companies. Bonds and shares of companies associated with Adani experienced a decline of more than $104 billion in market value after the accusations, representing approximately half of the market value. Hedge fund manager Bill Ackman said Hindenburg's Adani Report was "highly credible and extremely well researched." Adani denied the fraud allegations as without merit.

On 29 January, Adani released a 413-page response to the Hindenburg report, calling Hindenburg's conduct a "calculated securities fraud" and the report a "calculated attack on India, the independence, integrity and quality of Indian institutions, and the growth story and ambition of India." Hindenburg characterised the response as failing to engage with the issues raised by its initial report, and an exercise in obfuscation under the garb of nationalism. On 1 February, Adani cancelled its planned $2.5 billion (Rs 20,000 crore) Follow-on Public Offer (FPO) citing market volatility, and announced that it would return the FPO money to investors. Reserve Bank of India sought details from banks on exposure to Adani firms. Citigroup's wealth unit stopped extending margin loans to its clients against securities of Adani Group. Credit Suisse Group AG stopped accepting bonds of Adani Group companies as collateral for margin loans to its private banking clients. S&P Dow Jones Indices removed Adani Enterprises from its sustainability index.

Norway's Oil Fund, which had already shed a bulk of its Adani shares pre-Hindenburg report, divested its entire stake following the report.

On 19 May, on prima facie, a committee formed by the Supreme Court of India communicated its inability to conclude regarding the existence of a regulatory failure concerning the accusation of stock price manipulation by the group. This was primarily due to the insufficient information provided in the explanations by the SEBI's investigation. Earlier on 29 April, SEBI requested a six-month extension to conclude its investigation, instead of the initially given two months provided on 2 March. However, the Supreme Court granted a three-month extension and directed SEBI to complete the probe by 14 August 2023.

On 24 June 2023, Adani Group's share value took a significant dive, following reports that United States Department of Justice and US Securities and Exchange Commission were investigating the corporation's communications with its US-based investors, spurred by a report from a short seller.

On 31 August 2023, Organised Crime and Corruption Reporting Project (OCCRP) put forth allegations asserting that a substantial amount of funds, in the hundreds of millions of dollars, were directed into publicly traded stocks of the Adani Group. These investments purportedly occurred by means of investment funds situated in Mauritius, which are characterised as possessing a lack of transparency. These funds were reportedly associated with partners connected to the promoter family. Supporting evidence presented in the report indicates that these entities engaged in protracted activities involving the acquisition and divestiture of Adani stock through offshore mechanisms, thereby concealing their active participation. This covert engagement apparently yielded significant financial gains. Additionally, the documentation suggests that the overseeing investment firm compensated a company belonging to Vinod Adani for advisory services pertinent to their investment pursuits.

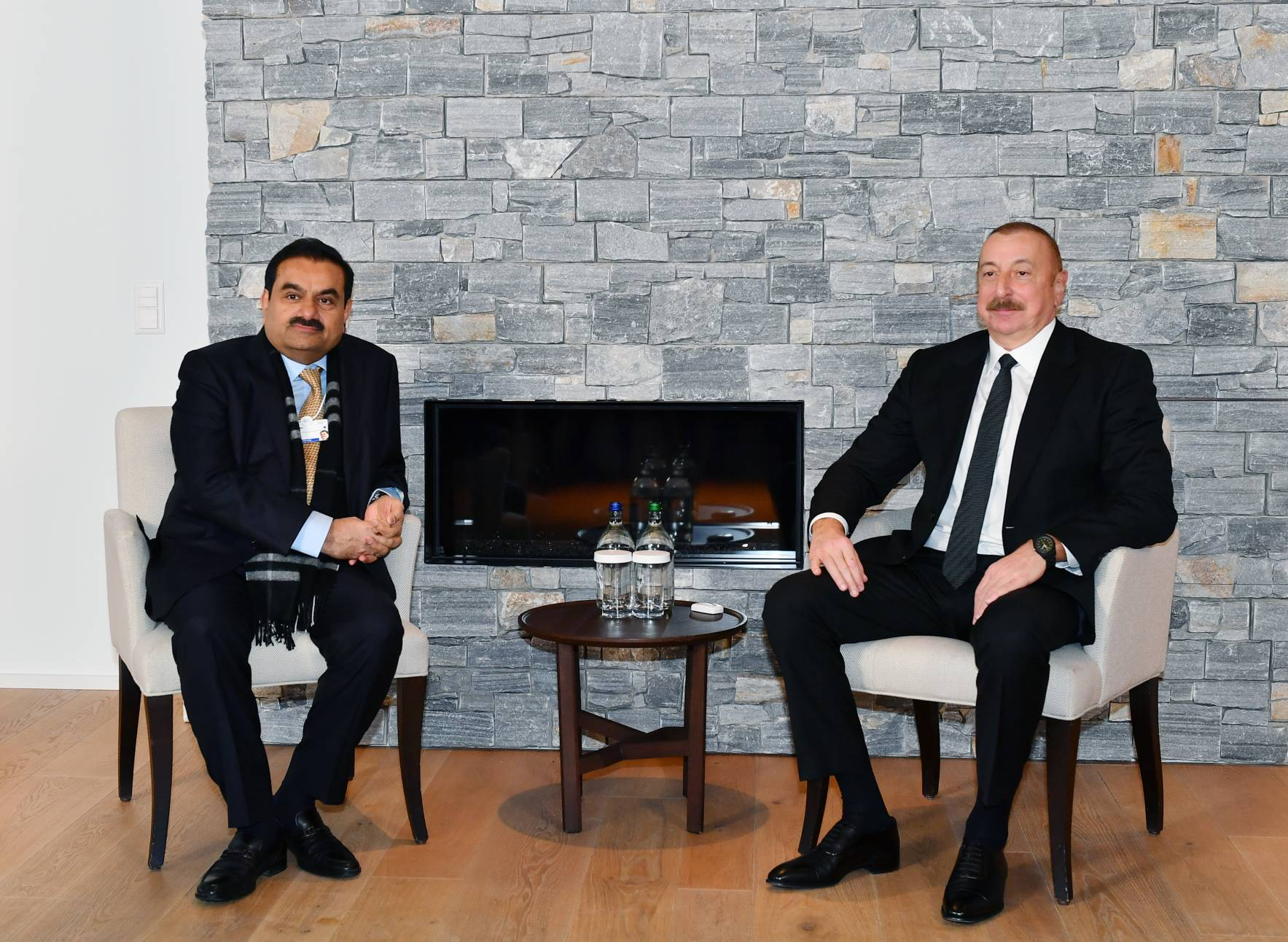
Gautam Adani with Azerbaijan's President Ilham Aliyev in Davos, Switzerland, 19 January 2023

In October 2023, the National Financial Reporting Authority initiated an investigation, reaching out to several audit firms involved in examining the financial records of the Adani Group's listed companies. The Adani group also reported that the government was probing financial records of Mumbai International Airport and Navi Mumbai International Airport, both operated by the group.

On 3 January 2024, the Supreme Court ordered SEBI to complete its probe within 90 days (3 months), sparked by allegations from short-seller Hindenburg Research. The Court dismissed requests for an SIT or CBI investigation and shifted focus to Hindenburg's conduct.

In March 2024, Seven Adani group firms were issued show cause notices by the SEBI for alleged "violation of related party transactions and non-compliance in listing regulations ."

After Hindenburg's allegations of fraud against the Adani group, GQG Partners LLC, an investment firm founded by Rajiv Jain purchased shares worth $4.6 billion in six Adani group subsidiaries. In September 2024, GQG Partners was charged by the Securities and Exchange Commission for hindering whistleblower protections, through its restrictive Non-disclosure agreements that disallowed employees from reporting potential violations.

Shares of the Adani Group fell sharply, with Adani Green Energy dropping 16% on 20 November 2024, after the US Securities and Exchange Commission (SEC) alleged violations, including hindering whistleblower protections. The allegations added to growing concerns over corporate governance within the conglomerate.

=== Presence in Kenya ===
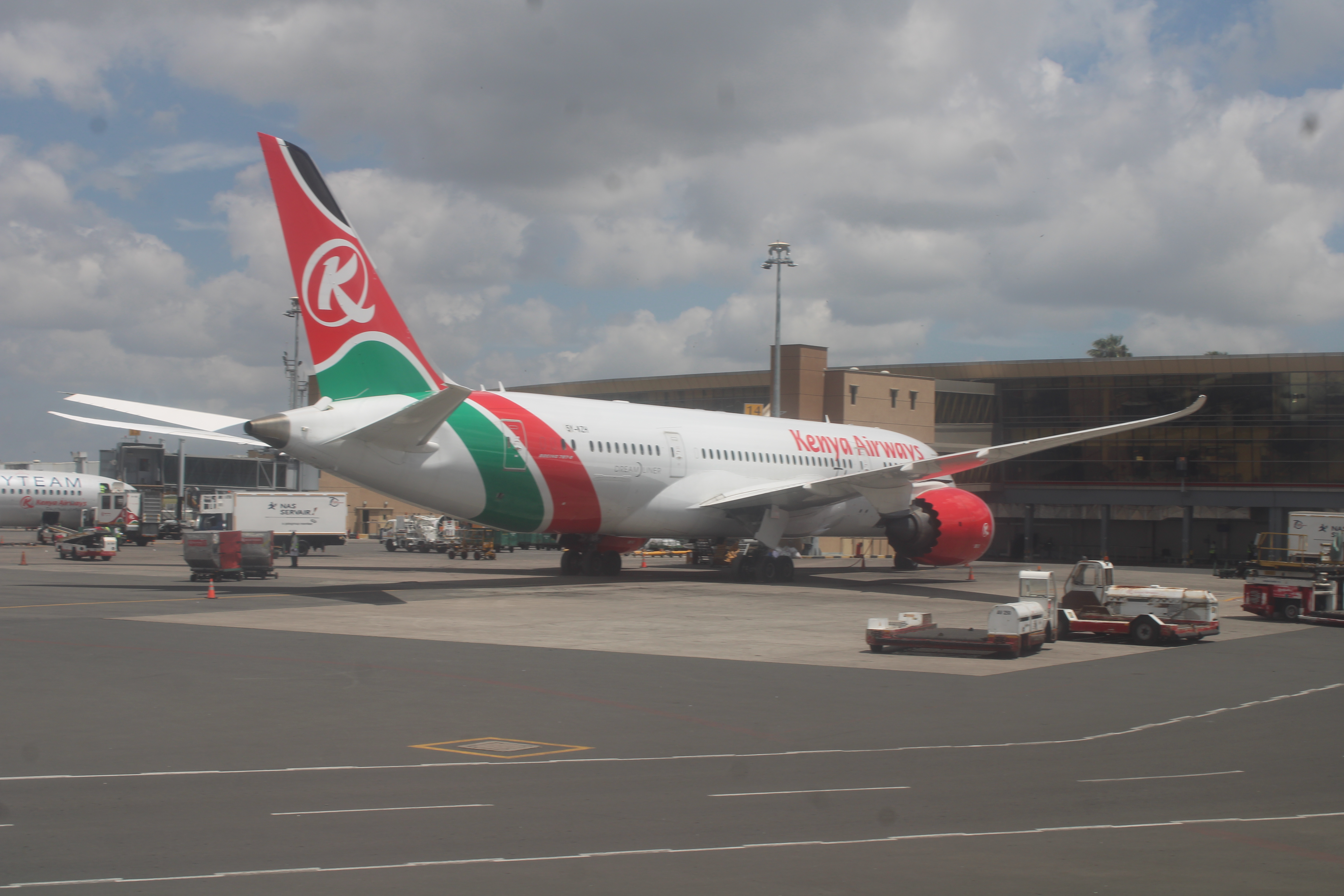
Jomo Kenyatta International Airport

In July 2024, a whistleblower alleged that the Kenya Airports Authority had signed a $1.85 billion deal for the Adani Group to manage the Jomo Kenyatta International Airport for a period of 30 years in a build–operate–transfer move. The alleged deal was brokered by ALG Global, a Spanish firm, and would be financed majorly by Kenyan taxpayers with full control of the airport granted to Adani Group for the 30 years. Following widespread protests, in September 2024, the Kenyan High Court temporarily suspended the proposal, to allow for judicial review. The whistleblower, Nelson Amenya, fears for his life.

On 16 September 2024, Adani group and Africa50 were given a $1.3 billion concession in a public-private partnership by the Kenyan government to build power transmission lines. On 25 October, Kenyan court suspended $736 million deal between Kenya Electrical Transmission Company and Adani Group's Adani Energy Solutions.

In October 2024, former Prime Minister of Kenya, Raila Odinga said he was introduced to Adani Group by Narendra Modi who organised a visit by Kenyan delegation to the projects of the company.

In November 2024, Kenya's President William Ruto has cancelled two significant deals with India's Adani Group: a lease agreement for Jomo Kenyatta International Airport, the country's main international airport, and a contract with the Kenya Electricity Transmission Company. This announcement came during Ruto's state of the nation address, just a day after Adani's directors faced charges in a New York court for alleged bribery and fraud. The airport deal, valued at $2.5 billion, involved a 30-year lease of JKIA and had been approved by the Kenya Airports Authority without public hearings. Experts had advised conducting a public tender for such a significant agreement. The proposal from Adani sought "favorable tax policies" from the Kenyan government, which raised concerns among critics. The deal had sparked significant backlash, leading to anti-government protests and a strike by airport workers. Before the cancellation, President Ruto had dismissed reports about the airport deal as "fake news." Just a week prior, Kenya's transport cabinet secretary defended the Adani Group and the airport agreement in parliament. The cancellation has been welcomed by some Kenyans, including whistleblower Nelson Amenya, who views it as a victory for citizen empowerment and an indication that change is possible in the country.

=== Arms export to Israel ===
In 2018, Adani Defence & Aerospace announced a joint venture with Elbit Systems, Israel's primary defence manufacturer, to produce Hermes 900 military drones in India. In February 2024, 20 Hermes 900 drones were supplied to Israel. In April 2024, the Indian government under the BJP abstained from the UN vote calling for an arms embargo on Israel. This decision has been linked to Adani's military exports to Israel.

=== Manipulating Wikipedia entries ===
A February 2023 article in The Signpost said that the Adani team has been manipulating Wikipedia entries using sock puppet accounts to insert promotional material and remove or edit criticism.

=== Bribery charges ===
In March 2024, the United States expanded its probe into Adani Group, particularly focusing on founder Gautam Adani's conduct and potential bribery by his group companies in exchange for favourable treatment regarding an energy project. The investigation is being handled by the United States Attorney for the Eastern District of New York and the United States Department of Justice Criminal Division's fraud unit in Washington. On 20 November 2024, federal prosecutors in New York charged Gautam Adani and his associates with multiple counts of fraud, including bribing Indian government officials with over $250 million to secure solar energy contracts.

In March 2025, the Indian government initiated proceedings to deliver a US Securities and Exchange Commission (SEC) summons to Gautam Adani concerning the alleged bribery scheme. The summons requires Adani or his legal representative to appear in the US case.

On 12 September 2024, the chief manufacturing officer of Ambuja Cement, a subsidiary of the Adani Group, was arrested over an alleged bribery attempt. In January 2026, Adani group's shares fell down by 10%, incurring a loss of $12.5 billion, following SEC's request to the Indian court to issue email summons to the defendants in the bribery case.

=== Coal price inflation ===
According to an investigation by the Financial Times, Adani group had imported $5 billion worth of coal at more than double the market prices through offshore intermediaries in Singapore, Taiwan and Dubai. A notice by Directorate of Revenue Intelligence also accused five Adani group companies of artificially inflating the value of imported coal from Indonesia by 50% to 100% in order to overcharge power companies. Adani group has also managed to block the release of documents to Indian government agencies for investigation in Singapore.

A May 2024 investigation by OCCRP and Financial Times indicated that Adani Group fraudulently inflated the price of coal that it supplied to domestic utility companies, by falsifying low-grade coal as high-grade coal.

In February 2025, it was revealed that the Adani Group paid £4 million to sponsor the green energy wing of London's Science Museum. This sponsorship faced criticism due to the company's involvement in coal mining and recent fraud allegations.

=== Media control ===
In August 2022, AMG Media Networks Limited (AMNL), a unit of Adani Group, declared that it planned to buy RRPR Holding, owner of 29.18% of national news broadcaster NDTV, and made an open offer to buy a further 26%. In a statement, NDTV said that Adani acquired his stake via a third party without informing the company's founders, former journalist Radhika Roy and her economist husband Prannoy Roy and that the deal was done "without discussion, consent or notice." This bid also raised concern regarding editorial independence in India, since Adani is considered to be close to Prime Minister Narendra Modi's ruling Bharatiya Janata Party. By December 2022, Adani was described as controlling the largest shareholding in NDTV. The Economist said that before Adani bought NDTV, the news channel was "critical of the government but is now supine."

In 2022, Ravi Nair, a freelance journalist was allegedly issued an 'arrest warrant' by the Delhi police without any prior summons after Adani group filed a defamation case against him.

In December 2023, Adani Group acquired majority stake in Indo-Asian News Service. Independent News Service (INS), the parent company which owns India TV is also backed by Gautam Adani, the chairman of Adani group.

== Affiliated companies ==
Industry	Company	Notes	Ref
Energy	Adani Green Energy		
Energy	Adani Power		
Energy	Adani New Industries (ANI)	Green hydrogen production; Battery manufacturing; Wind turbines; Solar modules	
Energy	Adani Total Gas (ATG)		
Utilities	Adani Energy Solutions		
Utilities	Adani Electricity	Power distribution in Mumbai with over 3M+ consumers	
Utilities	Adani Total Gas (ATG)		
Cement	Ambuja Cements	Acquired from Holcim Group on 15 May 2022	
Cement	ACC	Acquired from Holcim Group on 15 May 2022	
Transport & Logistics	Adani Ports & SEZ		
Transport & Logistics	Adani Airports Holdings (AAH): Chhatrapati Shivaji Maharaj International Airport; Navi Mumbai International Airport; Chaudhary Charan Singh International Airport; Mangalore International Airport; Thiruvananthapuram International Airport; Lokpriya Gopinath Bordoloi International Airport; Sardar Patel International Airport; Jaipur International Airport	AAH has secured lease, operate, and development rights for 50 years.; The airports are not owned by the Adani Group.	
Transport & Logistics	Adani Road Transport (ART)		
Transport & Logistics	North Queensland Export Terminal (NQXT)		
Technology & Data Centers	Adani Connex	Hyperscale Data Center service provider. All DCs run on 100% renewable energy.: Chennai; Mumbai (Planned); Noida (Planned); Hyderabad (Planned); Pune (Planned); Vizag (Planned)	
Consumer & B2C	Adani Digital Labs (ADL): AdaniOne	Multi-purpose super-app to book train tickets, flights, hotels and collect rewards.: Alpha development stage, see www.adanione.com; Acquisitions; Trainman, a train reservation platform; SIBIA Analytics, based in Kolkata	
Consumer & B2C	Adani Realty	Residential & Commercial real estate development	
Media	NDTV	Acquired BQ Prime from Quint Digital Media and rebranded it as NDTV Profit, see www.ndtvprofit.com	
Media	IANS India	Acquired IANS, a News Agency and News Wire	
Real Estate	Adani Properties	Redevelopment of Dharavi Slum in Mumbai	
Aviation Services	Air Works		

== Sports ==
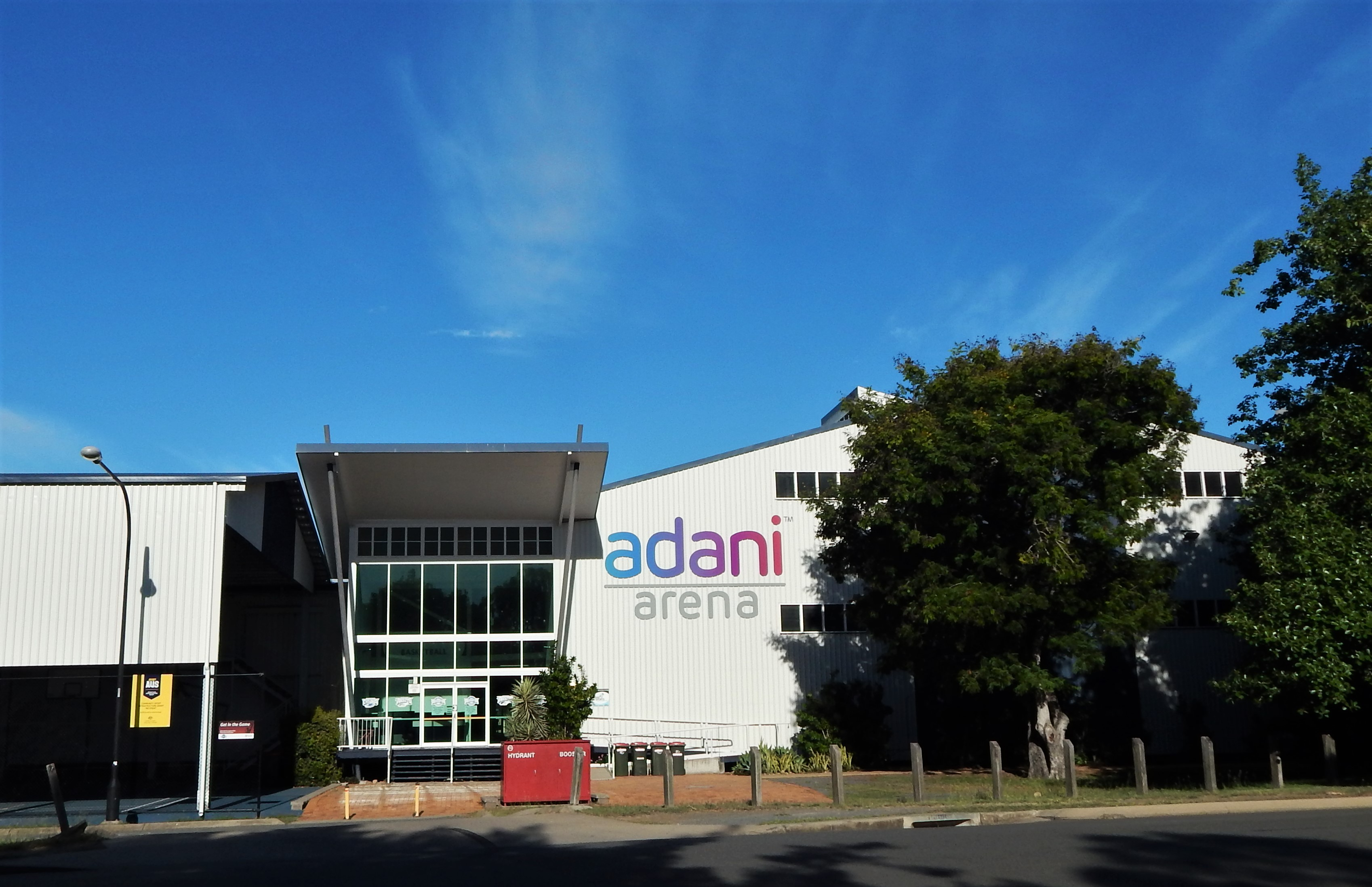
Adani Arena in Rockhampton, Australia

In addition to its industrial interests, the Adani group owns several sports teams, such as the Gujarat Giants team in the Pro Kabaddi League. In 2022, Adani Group acquired the Gulf Giants team in UAE's International League T20. In August 2022, It also purchased a franchise in Legends League Cricket. In 2023, it purchased a team in the Women's Premier League based in Ahmedabad.

=== Teams owned by Adani Group ===
Team	Sports	League	Refs
Gujarat Giants	Kabaddi	Pro Kabaddi League	
Gujarat Giants	Cricket	Women's Premier League	
Gulf Giants	Cricket	International League T20	
Gujarat Giants	Cricket	Legends League Cricket	
Gujarat Giants	Boxing	Big Bout Boxing League	
Gujarat Giants	Kho kho	Ultimate Kho Kho	

Adani also sponsored various other sports initiatives, including a 2016 nationwide programme to prepare athletes for Rio Olympics called Garv Hai (transl. We are proud). It was re-launched for a second time to groom athletes for 2020 Tokyo Olympics, 2022 Asian Games and Commonwealth Games. The programme focuses on archery, shooting, athletics, boxing, and wrestling. Beneficiaries of the Garv Hai pilot project in 2016 include Ankita Raina (tennis), Pinki Jangra (boxing), Shiva Thapa (boxing), Khushbir Kaur (athletics), Inderjeet Singh (athletics), Mandeep Jangra (boxing), Malaika Goel (shooting), Deepak Punia (wrestling), KT Irfan (Racewalking) and Sanjivani Jadhav (athletics).

Adani Group has naming rights on Hegvold Stadium (now known as Adani Arena) in Rockhampton and the pavilion end of the Narendra Modi Stadium in Ahmedabad.

In July 2022, Adani Sportsline was designated as an official partner of the Indian Olympic Association (IOA) for the Birmingham Commonwealth Games 2022, Hangzhou Asian Games 2022, and Paris Olympic Games 2024. Previously, Adani Sportsline supported the Indian team at the Tokyo Olympics in 2021. Through its GarvHai initiative, the organisation has supported over 28 athletes, including silver medalist wrestler Ravi Kumar Dahiya.

== See also ==
- List of companies of India
