= Indictment against Gautam Adani et al. =

2024 federal criminal trial

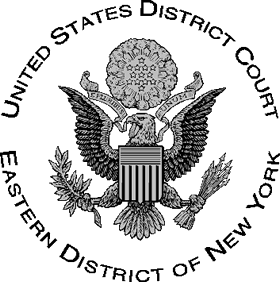
- Seal of the District Court for the Eastern District of New York
- Court: United States District Court for the Eastern District of New York
- Full case name: United States of America v. Gautam Adani et al.
- Docket nos.: 24-cr-433
- Charge: 5 counts against all defendants: Conspiracy to violate Foreign Corrupt Practices Act; Securities fraud; Mail and wire fraud; Conspiracy to obstruct justice

Court membership
- Judge sitting: Nicholas Garaufis (District Judge)

Indictment against Gautam Adani et al. is a 2024 federal indictment in the United States District Court for the Eastern District of New York. Indian billionaire Gautam Adani and seven top business executives of Adani Group and its affiliates have been charged for their alleged involvement in a scheme to pay hundreds of millions of dollars in bribes to Indian government officials and to hide the bribery from U.S. investors.

On November 20, 2024, a five-count indictment unsealed in Brooklyn charges Indian Energy Company executives Gautam Adani, Sagar Adani, and Vineet Jain with securities and wire fraud for a multi-billion-dollar scheme involving false statements to U.S. investors and global financial institution.

The U.S. Department of Justice (DOJ) moved to permanently dismiss the 2024 criminal indictment against Indian billionaire Gautam Adani and other executives, calling the prosecution legally flawed. The federal court has further been told that the criminal case was a name and shame indictment brought without any realistic prospect of a trial.

== Background ==
In March 2024, the United States expanded its probe into Adani Group, particularly focusing on founder Gautam Adani's conduct and potential bribery by his group companies in exchange for favorable treatment regarding an energy project. The investigation is being handled by the United States Attorney for the Eastern District of New York and the United States Department of Justice Criminal Division's fraud unit in Washington.

== Indictment ==
An unsealed five-count indictment in Brooklyn federal court charges Gautam Adani, his associates, and executives from other firms with a bribery and fraud scheme involving more than $250 million in payments to Indian government officials. The alleged bribes secured lucrative solar energy contracts for Adani Green Energy, projected to yield over $2 billion in profits, while misleading U.S. and international investors through false statements to raise funds. The indictment also accuses other individuals, including former employees of a Canadian institutional investor, of obstructing investigations by deleting evidence and providing false information to authorities.

The defendants allegedly concealed the bribery scheme by making false and misleading statements while raising over $3 billion through loans and bond offerings marketed to U.S. investors. The case, investigated by the Federal Bureau of Investigation and the United States Department of Justice's Fraud Section, highlights efforts to combat corruption and fraud impacting U.S. financial markets. Charges include securities fraud, wire fraud, violations of the Foreign Corrupt Practices Act, and obstruction of justice.

== Proceedings ==
On 12 December 2024, Magistrate Judge Vera M. Scanlon of the US District Court for the Eastern District of New York issued an order stating that, in consultation with District Judge Nicholas Garaufis, the court marked USA v. Adani et al., 24 Crim. 433 (NGG), SEC v. Adani et al., 24 Civ. 8080 (VMS), and SEC v. Cabanes, 24 Civ. 8081 (VMS) as related. To avoid scheduling conflicts, all three cases are assigned to the judges overseeing the criminal case.

In October 2025, the SEC informed the court that Indian authorities have yet to act on its requests to deliver summons and complaints to Adani Group executives over an alleged securities fraud and bribery case, despite repeated follow-ups, the latest being on September 14.

On 21 January 2026, SEC asked the court for help in serving summonses upon Gautam Adani and Sagar Adani. It said that India has previously refused its two procedural requests to serve the summonses for its civil case. Immediately there after, Gautam Adani’s lawyer addressed the Court on 23 January and presented his first arguments requesting the Court to defer its decision on the proposal submitted by the SEC on January 21. Thereafter, Gautam Adani and Sagar Adani agreed to receive legal notice from SEC, having 90 days to respond to it.
