= Welspun Enterprises =

Indian company

Welspun Enterprises Limited
- Formerly: MSK Projects (India) Limited (1976―2009); Welspun Projects Limited (2010―2014)
- Type: Public
- Traded as: NSE: WELENT; BSE: 532553
- ISIN: ISIN: INE625G01013
- Industry: Construction; Engineering; Utilities (energy)
- Founded: 1976
- Area served: India
- Key people: Balkrishan Goenka (Chairman); Sandeep Garg (Managing Director); Rajesh R. Mandawewala (Director)
- Parent: Welspun World

Welspun Enterprises Limited (WEL) is an Indian company that develops and operates roads, highways, and wastewater projects under various public–private partnership (PPP) models in rural and urban areas. The company is also involved in the oil and gas exploration sector through a joint venture with Adani Welspun Exploration Limited.

== History ==
=== MSK Projects (India) Limited ===
The company began its construction operations in 1976 as a partnership firm under the name M. S. Khurana. In 2004, it became a publicly listed entity with shares listed on the Bombay Stock Exchange (BSE), National Stock Exchange (NSE), and Vadodara Stock Exchange (VSE). In 2006, the company launched a joint venture, BUL MSK Infrastructure, to manage toll collection for the Dand Apta Kharpada and Kon Sawle Road Project. In 2010, it was renamed from MSK Projects (India) Ltd. to Welspun Projects Ltd. (WPL) and expanded into the energy sector. The company acquired a majority stake in the Aziz European Pipe factory in Saudi Arabia. In 2011, it acquired a 35% stake in Leighton Contractors (India) and established a new 350,000 MTPA LSAW plant in Anjar. Between 2012 and 2013, it completed several major construction projects, including Anjar Township, Bhilai Township, and Umergam Water Distribution.

=== Formation of Welspun Enterprises Limited ===
As part of the Welspun Group's infrastructure investment restructuring, a significant portion of WPL's EPC (Engineering, Procurement, and Construction) business was transferred to Leighton Welspun Contractors Private Limited (LWIN) in 2013. This transfer included WPL's water business and other EPC contracts, in exchange for a 7.5% equity stake in LWIN. The company also completed six build–operate–transfer (BOT) road projects covering over 500 km with a capital expenditure exceeding US$200 million. It was among the first developers to complete a National Highways Authority of India (NHAI) BOT project in India. In 2014, the Welspun Group decided to merge three of its units; Welspun Infratech Ltd, Welspun Plastics Pvt. Ltd, and Welspun Infra Projects Pvt. Ltd, with Welspun Projects Ltd to streamline its corporate structure and consolidate its balance sheet. The merged entity was named Welspun Enterprises.

=== Projects ===
Welspun Enterprises completed its first project, the Delhi-Meerut Expressway (Package I), in 2018, the first 14-lane expressway in India. In 2022, the company announced that the National Highways Authority of India (NHAI) issued a Provisional Certificate for Commercial Operation (PCOD) for 53.763 km (77.96%) of the total project length of 68.960 km. This certificate related to the 8-laning of the section of NH-1 (New NH-44) from Mukarba Chowk to Panipat on a Build-Operate-Transfer (BOT) (Toll) basis.

The company divested its entire 15.49% stake in Welspun Energy. It also sold a 37% stake in its Dewas-Bhopal corridor project to an infrastructure fund managed by IDFC Alternatives for Rs 662 crore. Welspun Enterprises initially held a 50% stake in the 142.6 km Dewas-Bhopal Corridor Pvt. Ltd. (DBCL), with the remaining stake held by Chetak Enterprises Ltd., a highways developer. Following the sale, Welspun Enterprises now holds a 13% stake in the project. Currently, the company is involved in executing several projects, including the Rural Water Supply Project under the Government of India's Jal Jeevan Mission in Uttar Pradesh, covering 2,500 villages.

In March 2024, Welspun Enterprises was commissioned by the Brihanmumbai Municipal Corporation (BMC) to design, build, and operate a 2,000 MLD (million liters per day) Water Treatment Plant (WTP) at the Bhandup Complex in Mumbai. The company was also commissioned to construct an Access Controlled Multi-Modal Corridor from Navghar to Balavali in the state of Maharashtra on EPC Mode Package MMC-11, covering the stretch from Kalambsure (km 88+620) to Govirle (km 96+410) in Tq. Uran & District Raigad (length - 7.79 km) for the Maharashtra State Road Development Corporation.

== Partnerships, acquisitions and subsidiaries ==
In 2020, Welspun Enterprises acquired a build-operate-transfer (BOT) toll project from Essel Group's company, Mukarba Chowk-Panipat Toll Roads (MCPTRL). The company also signed a pact with the National Highways Authority of India (NHAI) for a Rs 20.05 billion highway project in Tamil Nadu. In December 2022, the company sold six highway projects to Actis, a London-based global investment firm, for $775 million.

In August 2023, the company announced that it had acquired a 50.10% stake in Michigan Engineers, an engineering, procurement, and construction (EPC) company in the urban water infrastructure segment, for Rs.137.07 crore. WEL acquired a 36.05% stake from Authum Investment & Infrastructure and a 14.05% stake from Sansaar Housing Finance. With this acquisition, Michigan Engineers became a subsidiary of WEL.
