= Gautam Adani =

Indian businessman (born 1962)

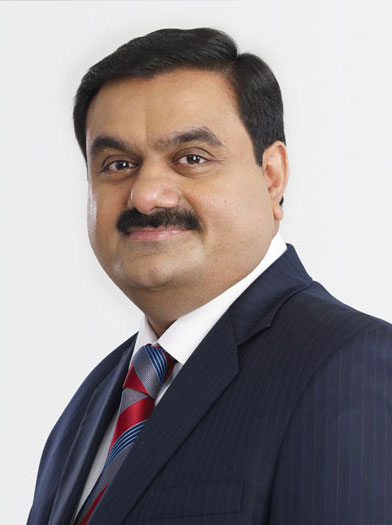
- Adani in 2012
- Born: Gautam Shantilal Adani; 24 June 1962 (age 64); Ahmedabad, Gujarat, India
- Title: Founder and Chairman of the Adani Group
- Spouse: Priti Vora (m. 1986)
- Children: 2
- Relatives: Vinod Adani (brother)

Gautam Shantilal Adani (Gujarati: [ɡəʊt̪əm ʃãn̪t̪ilal əd̪aɳiː]) (born 24 June 1962) is an Indian billionaire businessman who is the founder and chairman of the Adani Group, a multinational conglomerate involved in port development and operations in India. As of June 2026, Adani is ranked as the second richest person in India and 24th in the world, with a net worth of $89.6 billion. In 2022, Time magazine included him in the 100 most influential people in the world.

As a teenager, Adani moved to Mumbai in 1978 to work as a diamond sorter for Mahendra Brothers. In 1981, Adani managed his elder brother's plastic unit in Ahmedabad which was his gateway to global trading through polyvinyl chloride (PVC) imports and establishing the Adani Group in 1988.

Adani has been described as being close to India's Prime Minister Narendra Modi and to his ruling Bharatiya Janata Party government which has led to allegations of cronyism. In January 2023, the American short selling activist firm Hindenburg Research accused Adani of stock manipulation and fraud. In January 2024, the Supreme Court resolved the Adani Group stocks dispute arising from Hindenburg Research's allegations and dismissed requests for an SIT or CBI investigation.

On 20 November 2024, a five-count criminal indicment by the U.S. Attorney's Office in Brooklyn, New York, charged Adani and executives for five criminal counts of bribery. Adani is alleged to have paid over $250 million in bribes to Indian government officials to secure contracts in Andhra Pradesh, Chhattisgarh, Odisha, Jammu and Kashmir, and Tamil Nadu.

== Early life and education ==
Adani was born on 24 June 1962 into a Jain family to Shantilal and Shantaben Adani in Ahmedabad, Gujarat. He has seven siblings. His parents had migrated from the town of Tharad in the northern part of Gujarat. His father was a small textile merchant.

Adani was educated at Sheth Chimanlal Nagindas Vidyalaya school in Ahmedabad, but dropped out when he was 16. Adani was keen on business, but not his father's textile business.

== Career ==
As a teenager, Adani moved to Mumbai in 1978 to work as a diamond sorter for Mahendra Brothers. In 1981, his elder brother Mahasukhbhai Adani bought a plastics unit in Ahmedabad and invited him to manage the operations. This venture turned out to be Adani's gateway to global trading through polyvinyl chloride (PVC) imports. In 1985, he started importing primary polymers for small-scale industries. In 1988, Adani established Adani Exports, now known as Adani Enterprises, the holding company of the Adani Group. Originally, the company dealt in agricultural and power commodities. In 1991, the economic liberalisation policies turned out to be favourable for his company and he started expanding the businesses into trading of metals, textiles, and agro products.

In 2006, Adani entered the power generation business. From 2009 to 2012, he acquired Abbot Point Port in Australia and Carmichael coal mine in Queensland.

=== Adani Group ===
In 1994, the Government of Gujarat announced managerial outsourcing of the Mundra Port and in 1995, Adani obtained the contract.

In 1995, he set up the first jetty. Originally operated by Mundra Port & Special Economic Zone, the operations were transferred to Adani Ports & SEZ (APSEZ). Today, the company is the largest private multi-port operator. Mundra Port is the largest private sector port in India, with the capacity of handling close to 210.150 million tons of cargo per annum.

In 1996, the power business arm of the Adani Group, Adani Power, was founded by Adani. Adani Power holds thermal power plants with a capacity of 4620MW, the largest private thermal power producer of the country.

In 2012, the Serious Fraud Investigation Office (SFIO) filed a charge sheet against twelve accused including Adani for cheating & criminal conspiracy related to the purchase and sale of shares. According to SFIO, Adani Agro allegedly provided funds and shares for running illegal activities. A local court in Mumbai discharged Adani & others accused of this case in May 2014. However, in 2020, a Mumbai sessions court overturned the clean chit to Adani in this case.

In May 2020, Adani won the world's largest solar bid by the Solar Energy Corporation of India (SECI) worth US$6 billion. The 8000MW photovoltaic power plant project will be taken up by Adani Green; Adani Solar will establish 2000MW of additional solar cell and module manufacturing capacity.

In September 2020, Adani acquired a 74% stake in Mumbai International Airport, India's second busiest after Delhi.

In May 2022, Adani family acquired Ambuja Cements and its subsidiary ACC from Swiss building materials giant Holcim Group for $10.5 billion, through an overseas special-purpose entity.

In August 2022, AMG Media Networks Limited (AMNL), a unit of Adani Group, declared that it planned to buy RRPR Holding, owner of 29.18% of national news broadcaster NDTV, and made an open offer to buy a further 26%. In a statement, NDTV said that Adani acquired his stake via a third party without informing the company's founders, former journalist Radhika Roy and her economist husband Prannoy Roy and that the deal was done “without discussion, consent or notice.” This bid also raised concern regarding editorial independence in India, since Adani is considered to be close to Prime Minister Narendra Modi’s ruling Bharatiya Janata Party. By December 2022, Adani was described as controlling the largest shareholding in NDTV. The Economist said that before Adani bought NDTV, the news channel was "critical of the government but is now supine."

=== Hindenburg's report ===
In January 2023, Adani and his companies were accused of stock manipulation by New York-based investment firm Hindenburg Research in a report titled "Adani Group: How The World's 3rd Richest Man Is Pulling The Largest Con In Corporate History". Following that, Adani Group stocks plummeted $45 billion. The losses resulted in Adani dropping from the 3rd richest person in the world to 22nd on Forbes' billionaires tracker. The report accused the group of having substantial debt and being on a "precarious financial footing", causing stocks of seven listed Adani companies to fall 3-7%. The report was released ahead of Adani Enterprises' follow-on public offering, which opened on Friday, 6 pm, 27 January 2023. The Adani Group's CFO (Jugeshinder 'Robbie' Singh) stated that the timing of the report's publication was a "brazen, mala fide intention" to damage the offering. The Adani Enterprises public offering was cancelled on 1 February 2023.

The Adani Group said that the Hindenburg Research report was "malicious combination of selective misinformation and stale" information, and that they were "evaluating the relevant provisions under U.S. and Indian laws for remedial and punitive action against Hindenburg Research". Reuters reported that it was unlikely that the Adani Group would sue Hindenburg in the U.S. because American courts usually regard financial analysis as protected opinion under American free speech laws. The Adani Group published a 413-page rebuttal to the claims by Hindenburg Research.

According to a court filing, Gautam Adani and his nephew, Sagar Adani, have agreed to accept legal notice from the U.S. Securities and Exchange Commission in a civil fraud lawsuit alleging that they misled investors regarding a bribery scheme.

=== OCCRP report ===
The Organised Crime and Corruption Reporting Project (OCCRP) reported in August 2023 that it had documents which prove how the Adani Group used individuals and front companies to buy and sell Adani stocks thus bypassing Indian securities laws that seek to prevent share price manipulation. The OCCRP named two individuals — Nasser Ali Shaban Ahli and Chang Chung-Ling — as being responsible for stock trading in and on behalf of Adani Group stocks amounting to hundreds of millions of dollars.

=== Bribery charges ===
On 21 November 2024, Gautam Adani and his associates were charged by a district court in New York for paying bribes of more than US$250 million to Indian government officials in order to obtain favourable energy contracts. Prosecutors also claimed that Adani group had raised US$3 billion in loans and bonds by concealing the scheme from American investors through false and misleading statements. Following the news his net worth fell by $12 billion.

As a result of the indictments, Kenya canceled over US$2.5 billion in regards to the takeover of Jomo Kenyatta International Airport and other energy deals. There were concerns in Kenya that they could be liable for breach of contract costs.

On 21 January 2026, SEC asked the court for help in serving summonses upon Gautam Adani and Sagar Adani. Immediately there after, Gautam Adani and Sagar Adani agreed to receive legal notice from SEC, having 90 days to respond to it.

In May 2026, the New York Times reported that the Department of Justice under the second Donald Trump administration was in the process of dropping the charges against Adani. This came in the wake of Adani hiring a new legal team, led by Trump's personal lawyer Robert Giuffra. In September 2026, U.S. District Judge Nicholas Garaufis criticised Associate Deputy Attorney General Trent McCotter's efforts to dismiss the case against Gautam Adani and his co-defendants, and ruled that charges can’t be dropped until DOJ complies with the instructions.

=== Bhagalpur land allocation ===
In September 2025, the Indian National Congress accused the Central Government of "gifting" 1,050 acres of land in Pirpainti, Bhagalpur district, Bihar, to Adani Power Limited for a thermal power plant project under highly favourable terms. The claim is that the land was leased for Re 1 per year for a period of 33 years, and included about ten lakh trees growing on that land.

=== Carmichael coal mine project ===
Adani's Carmichael coal mine project in Queensland, Australia has faced a decade of protests, environmental concerns regarding the Great Barrier Reef and groundwater, and legal challenges. Critics, including activist groups and indigenous custodians, have cited concerns over financial transparency, environmental destruction, and alleged harassment. Adani has described the experience as a "decade-long battle" and a "defining test of resilience," arguing that the project was misrepresented and that the group faced unfair, coordinated resistance.

== Festival support ==
In 2025, Gautam Adani attended the Maha Kumbh Mela in Prayagraj with his family, including his wife, Priti Adani. During the event, the Adani Group collaborated with ISKCON to organize Mahaprasad Seva, an initiative that provided free meals to devotees throughout the festival, which took place from January 13 to February 26, 2025.

== Political views ==
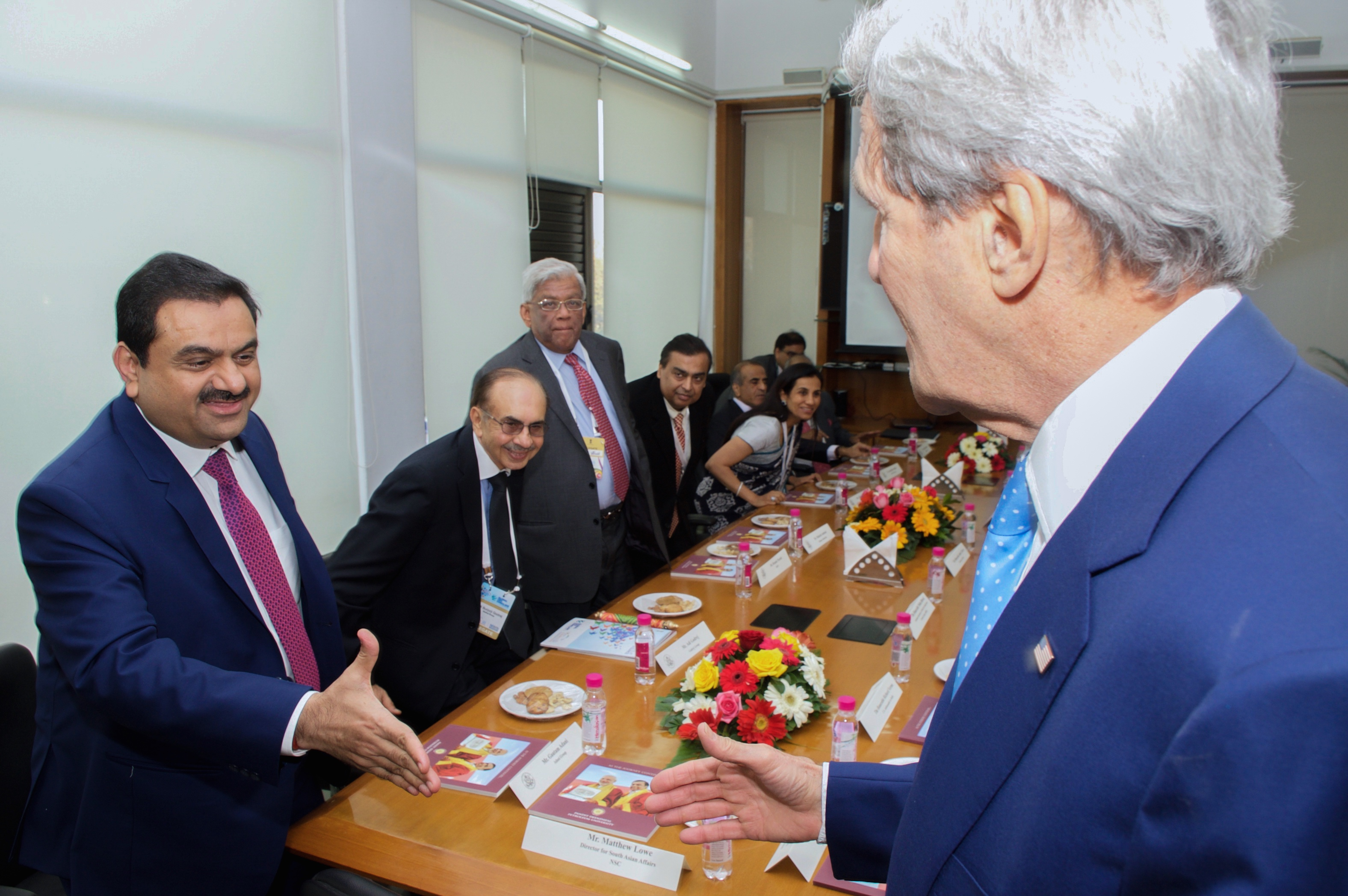
Secretary of State John Kerry greets Gautam Adani, 2014.

Adani is widely known for being close to Indian Prime Minister Narendra Modi and his ruling Bharatiya Janata Party. This has led to allegations of cronyism as his firms have won many Indian energy and infrastructure government contracts. An Indian government auditor accused Modi in 2012 of giving low cost fuel from a Gujarat state-run gas company to Adani and other businesspeople, during Modi's chief ministership of the state.

Adani and Modi have both denied allegations of cronyism. The Economist has described Adani as "a master operator", skilled at "navigating the complicated legal and political landscape of Indian capitalism," although the magazine cautions that his firm is known for its "Byzantine" structure and opaque finances.

The Resurgent Group of Gujarat (RGG) was founded as a rival organisation by local businessmen with Adani as its chairman, after leaders of the Confederation of Indian Industry (CII) criticized Modi's management of the 2002 Gujarat riots.

== Personal life ==
Gautam Adani married Priti Vora, a dentist, in 1986 and has two sons, Karan and Jeet. Priti Adani is the chairperson of Adani Group’s philanthropic arm, the Adani Foundation. Karan is CEO of Adani Ports & SEZ. Jeet leads the Adani Airports business and the Adani Digital Labs.

In January 1998, Adani and an associate, Shantilal Patel, were allegedly abducted and held hostage for ransom. Two former gangsters Fazl-ur-Rehman and Bhogilal Darji, were accused of the kidnapping. They were acquitted in an Indian court in 2018, after Adani and Patel did not show up for depositions, despite multiple summons by the court.

Adani was in the restaurant of Taj Mahal Palace Hotel in Mumbai having dinner with the CEO of Dubai Ports at 21:50 on 26 November 2008 when the hotel was attacked by terrorists. The terrorists were only 15 feet (4.6 m) away from them. Adani hid in the hotel kitchen and later in the toilet and came out safely at 08:45 the next day.

In February 2022, he became Asia's richest person, surpassing Mukesh Ambani, and in August 2022, he was named the 3rd richest person in the world by Fortune.

In June 2026, he become Asia's richest man again.
