= Africa50 =

Infrastructure investment platform

Africa50 is an infrastructure investment platform that was founded by the African Development Bank (AfDB) and African states.

== History ==
It was conceived after a 2012 declaration by African heads of state as part of the Program for Infrastructure Development in Africa (PIDA) that called for innovative solutions to facilitate infrastructure delivery. Africa50 was ratified by African Finance Ministers in May 2013, and its headquarters were launched in Casablanca, Morocco in September 2014. Its Constitutive General Assembly of founding shareholders took place in July 2015 in Casablanca, with around $700 million in initial capital subscriptions from 20 African states and the AfDB. 90% of the financial pledges were earmarked for project financing and the remainder for project development.

At the first Shareholders Meeting in July 2016 two more African states and two central banks joined Africa50, and at the second Shareholders Meeting in September 2017 two more states joined, bringing the total to 25, and committed capital to over $800 million. The member countries are: Benin, Burkina Faso, Cameroon, Democratic Republic of Congo, Djibouti, Egypt, Gabon, Gambia, Ghana, Guinea, Ivory Coast, Kenya, Madagascar, Malawi, Mali, Mauritania, Morocco, Niger, Nigeria, Republic of Congo, Senegal, Sierra Leone, Sudan, Togo and Tunisia.

== Functions ==
Africa50 uses equity investments to catalyze public sector and private sector capital into viable projects. Its primary sectors are energy and transport, but other sectors such as water, sanitation and IT are also considered. Projects should have a development impact in the host country while also offering a financial return. It has separate Project Development and Project Finance divisions and can thus work on the entire project cycle.

== Projects ==
Africa50's first investment was in December 2016, with Scatec Solar and Norfund, for development of a 100 MWDC solar power plant in Jigawa state, Nigeria. The total project cost will be about $150 million, with operations to start in 2018. Its second investment was with the same partners in six solar plants totaling 400 MWDC in Benban, Egypt. Total project cost will be about $450 million. Financial close was reached on October 27, 2017. Operations should start in early 2019. The third project, signed in September 2017, is with the state electricity company of Senegal - Senelec - for a 120 MW power plant that will run on fuel oil but can be converted to natural gas once Senegal's reserves become available. Africa50 will assist Senelec to select the developer and mobilise financing.

== Management ==
Alain Ebobissé is CEO of Africa50 and Carole Wamuyu Wainaina is COO. The Chairman of the Board of Directors is Akinwumi Adesina, President of the African Development Bank.
