= Air Works =

Indian aircraft maintenance company

- Company type: Private Limited
- Industry: Aviation
- Founders: B.G. Menon and D. Anandaram
- Headquarters: Gurgaon, Haryana, India
- Key people: Anand Bhaskar (MD & CEO)
- Services: Aircraft maintenance; MRO
- Website: airworks.aero

Air Works is the oldest Indian independent Aircraft maintenance company which provides services for Maintenance, Repair & Overhaul (MRO).

Currently the company is responsible for heavy maintenance of Indian Navy’s Boeing P-8I maritime surveillance aircraft.

== History and operation ==
Air Works was started in 1951 by B.G. Menon and D. Anandaram. Commercial Aviation MRO (MRO for airlines/commercial jets/cargo operators) began in 1993 with Jet Airways for 2–3 years, and then in Hosur (Tamil Nadu) when Air Works built its own hangar for repair.

Air Works, together with its sister/group companies Acumen Aviation and SA Air Works, is India's sole MRO that serves all three client sectors. General Aviation, Commercial Aviation and Defence MRO.

In 2008, Air Works became the first MRO company in India to receive regulatory approval from the DGCA. The first MRO center opened in Bangalore, Karnataka.

Scandinavian Avionics, a Denmark-based Aerospace company partnered with Air Works in 2010.

In 2011, Air Works began maintenance, checks and services for BBJ (Boeing Business Jet) for Defense MRO (aviation assets owned or operated by Indian Armed Forces – Indian Air Force & Navy).

Air Works acquired Dubai based Empire Aviation Group FZCO in 2012.

British company Air Livery Limited was acquired by Air Works in 2013 with 85% stake. The company was expanded in 20 cities of India until 2013.

In 2014, the company partnered with Yaksa Investment Nepal to provide MRO services for international and domestic airlines operating out of Tribhuvan International Airport, Kathmandu.

Air Works has partnerred with the UAE-based Mach Technik Aircraft Maintenance to provide international line maintenance services to Dubai.

In February 2020, Lieutenant General Ajay Kumar Singh and Haseeb Drabu, Indian politician and economist were appointed as company's board of directors. In May 2021, the company partnered with Objectify.

Boeing, the American aircraft manufacturer partnered with Air Works in February 2021.

The European Aviation Safety Agency has approved Air Works Kochi facility to undertake maintenance for Airbus 320 jets in September 2022. In October 2022, Air Works was acquired by Adani Group.

In 2023, the company started maintenance for Boeing P-8 Poseidon with its expansion in Australia and New Zealand.

== Awards ==
- 2023 ASSOCHAM's Best MRO award for India's Air Works at 14th International Conference
- Aviation Week MRO of the Year Awards 2011
