= Sipat Thermal Power Station =

Building in India

Sipat Super Thermal Power Plant
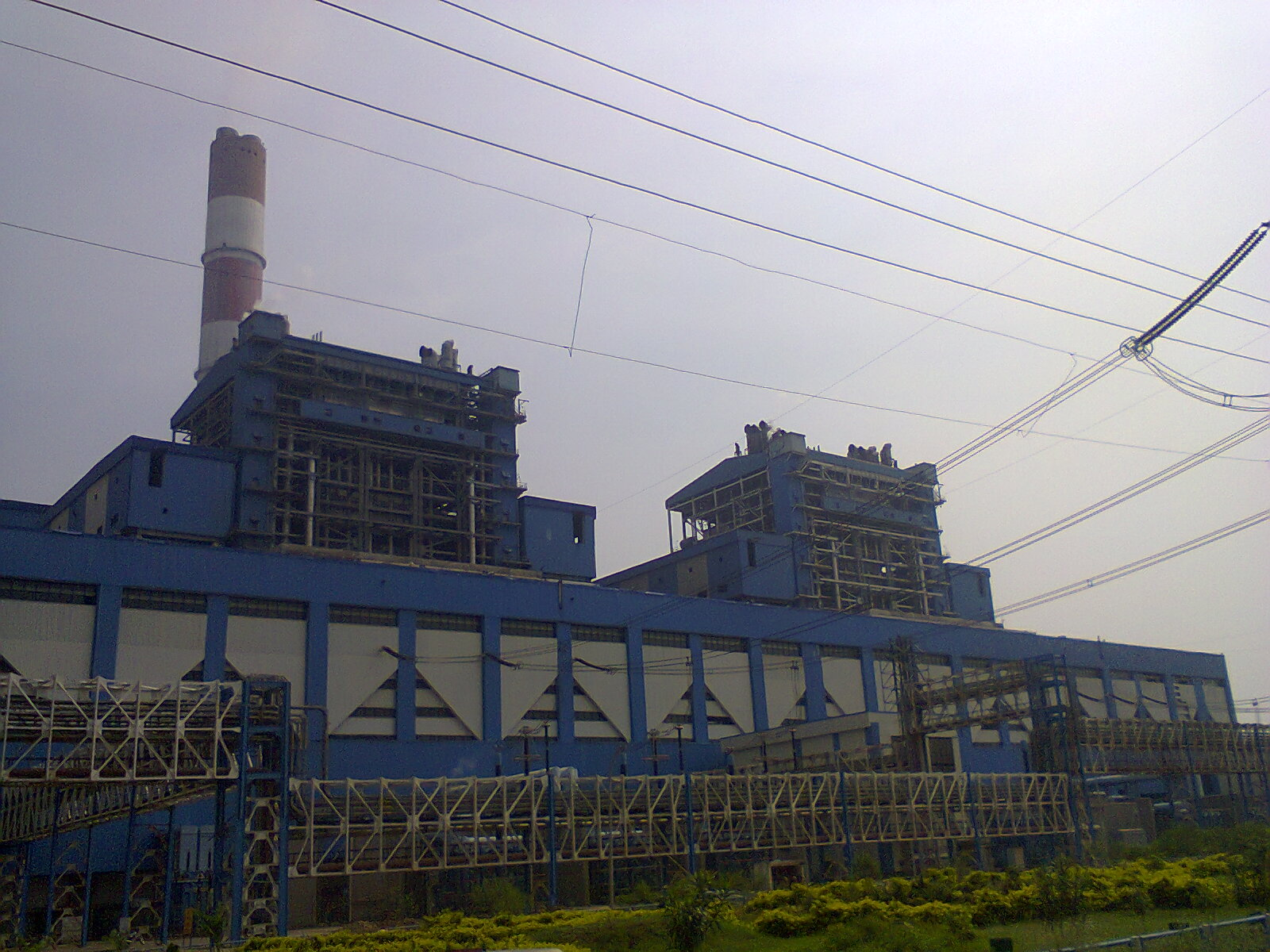
- Country: India
- Location: Bilaspur Chhattisgarh
- Coordinates: 22.1316°N 82.2920°E
- Status: Operational
- Owner: National Thermal Power Corporation
- Operator: NTPC Limited

Thermal power station
- Primary fuel: Coal

Power generation
- Nameplate capacity: 2,980 MW

External links
- Website: www.ntpc.co.in/power-generation/coal-based-power-stations/sipat
- Commons: Related media on Commons

Sipat Super Thermal Power Station is located at Sipat in Bilaspur district in the state of Chhattisgarh. It is one of the coal based power plants of NTPC. The coal for the plant is sourced from Dipika Mines of South Eastern Coalfields Limited.

The project has an installed capacity of 2980 MW, consisting of two stages. Stage one was of 3 units of 660 MW each, involving super-critical boilers technology, and stage two consisted of 2 units of 500 MW each.

PM Manmohan Singh inaugurated the Sipat Thermal Power Plant on September 20, 2013.

Stage	Unit number	Installed capacity (MW)	Date of commissioning	Status
1st	1	660	2011 June	Running
1st	2	660	2011 December	Running
1st	3	660	2012 June	Running
2nd	4	500	2007 May	Running
2nd	5	500	2008 August	Running
Total	5	2980		

== Transport ==
Sipat Super Thermal Power Station is located off the Tatanagar–Bilaspur section of Howrah–Nagpur–Mumbai line.
