= Godda Thermal Power Station =

Power Station in Jharkhand, India

- Location of the Godda Thermal Power Station in Jharkhand
- Country: India
- Location: Godda, Jharkhand
- Coordinates: 24°49′03″N 87°08′10″E
- Status: Commissioned
- Construction began: 2018
- Commission date: 2022
- Owner: Adani Power
- Operator: Adani Power

Thermal power station
- Primary fuel: Coal

Power generation
- Units operational: 2 (800 MW each)
- Nameplate capacity: 1,600 MW

Godda Thermal Power Station is a coal power plant dedicated for electricity export to Bangladesh. It is located in Godda district, Jharkhand, India. The power generation capacity is 1,600 MW. The plant was built under an agreement between the Government of India and Bangladesh.

== History ==
In February 2016, Adani Power had applied for terms of reference to build a 1,600 MW coal-based power plant in Godda district. The terms of reference were approved in July 2016. The project was given environmental clearance on 31 August 2017.

Adani Power signed a MoU with the Bangladesh Power Development Board on 11 August 2016 to set up 2x800 MW thermal power plants in India on build-and-operate (BOO) basis.

== Capacity ==
Unit No.	Generating Capacity	Commissioned on	Status
1	800 MW	April 2023	commissioned
2	800 MW	June 2023	commissioned

== Fuel ==
The thermal power plant will use imported coal as fuel. The company plans to procure coal under long-term contracts from countries like Indonesia, South Africa and Australia. Finally known that coal will supply from Australia's Carmichael mine for the power plant at Godda. The imported coal will be unloaded from ships at Dhamra port in Odisha and transported to the power plant by rail. An estimated 7-9 million tonnes of coal will be required annually.

== Protest ==
Local peoples were assaulted and harassed for acquiring land for power projects. According to Newslaundry, few local news publications published short reports on the violence.

A legal case filed by local villagers in the Jharkhand High Court was scheduled for hearing as early as August 2020. The government of Jharkhand denied all allegations brought by the claimants and contested the court action.

High power transmission lines have been constructed in Farakka area of Murshidabad district in West Bengal to carry electricity from Adani Group's thermal power plant in Jharkhand's Godda district to neighboring Bangladesh. Farmers are protesting against the installation of high-voltage cables over mango-litchu orchards and the cutting of mango-litchu trees in orchards.
