= Sipat =

Coordinates: 22°08′45″N 82°17′28″E

- Town
- Interactive map of Sipat
- Country: India
- State: Chhattisgarh
- District: Bilaspur

Languages
  - Official: Hindi, Chhattisgarhi
- Time zone: UTC+5:30 (IST)
- PIN: 495555
- Telephone code: 07752
- Vehicle registration: CG
- Nearest city: Bilaspur
- Lok Sabha constituency: Bilaspur
- Vidhan Sabha constituency: Masturi

Sipat is a small developing town approximately 22 kilometres (14 mi) from Bilaspur, the second largest city in the Indian state of Chhattisgarh. It has been in the news due to the development of a new power plant by NTPC Limited in that area. The project was started in 2001 by Indian former Prime Minister Atal Bihari Vajpayee. NTPC Sipat has total installed capacity of 2980 MW and has two stages: Stage-I comprises 3 units of 660 megawatts each and Stage-II comprises 2 units of 500 megawatts each. The thermal power generation in NTPC Sipat Stage-I is based on "Super Critical Boiler Technology" which is the advanced technology in thermal power generation.

NTPC Limited has helped the town to develop by providing business prospectives in the area and by providing education and healthcare facilities.
