= Shefali Shah filmography =

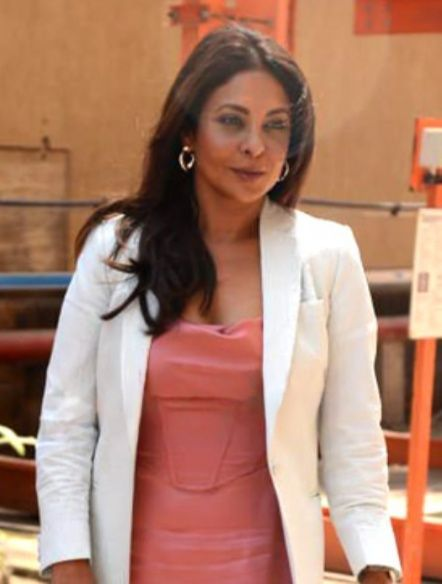
Shah in 2022 promoting her film Jalsa

Shefali Shah is an Indian actress of Hindi films, television and web series, and theatre. She started her career in Gujarati theatre before becoming a leading actress of Indian television and later moving to film work.

== Films ==
Key
†	Denotes films that have not yet been released

Year	Title	Role(s)	Notes
1995	Rangeela	Gulbadan	
1998	Satya	Pyaari Mhatre	
1999	Dariya Chhoru	Dariya	Gujarati film
2000	Mohabbatein	Nandini Khanna	
2001	Monsoon Wedding	Ria Verma	
2005	Waqt: The Race Against Time	Sumitra Thakur	
2005	15 Park Avenue	Lakshmi J. Roy	
2007	Gandhi, My Father	Kasturba Gandhi	
2007	The Last Lear	Vandana	
2008	Black & White	Roma Mathur	
2010	Karthik Calling Karthik	Dr. Shweta Kapadia	
2011	Kucch Luv Jaisaa	Madhu S. Saxena	
2014	Lakshmi	Jyoti	
2014	Words with Gods	Aprana	Segment: God Room
2015	Dil Dhadakne Do	Neelam Mehra	
2015	Brothers	Maria Gary Fernandes	
2017	Commando 2 : The Black Money Trail	Leela Chaudhari	
2017	Juice	Manju Singh	Short film
2018	Once Again	Tara Shetty	
2021	Ajeeb Daastaans	Natasha	Segment: Ankahi; Netflix film
2021	Happy Birthday Mummyji	Unnamed	Also director and writer; Short film
2022	Jalsa	Rukhsana	Amazon Prime Video film
2022	Darlings	Shamshunissa Ansari	Netflix film
2022	Doctor G	Dr. Nandini Srivastav	
2023	Neeyat	Mira Rao	Cameo appearance
2023	Three of Us	Shailaja Desai	

== Television ==
Year	Title	Role(s)	Notes
1993	Naya Nukkad	N/A	
1993	Tara	Mala Malhotra	
1994–1998	Banegi Apni Baat	Richa	
1996	Patjhad	N/A	
1996	Aarohan	Cadet Nivedita Sen	
1996	Hasratein	Savithri/Saavi	
1997	Kabhie Kabhie	Radha Pathak	
1997	Sea Hawks	N/A	
1999	Raahein	Preeti	
2008	Ramayan	Sunaina	
2012	Savdhaan India	Host	
2019–present	Delhi Crime	DCP Vartika Chaturvedi	Netflix series
2022	Human	Dr. Gauri Nath	Disney+ Hotstar series

== Dubbing artist ==
Year	Movie	Role	Notes
2016	The Jungle Book	Raksha	Voice (Hindi)
