= List of awards and nominations received by Shefali Shah =

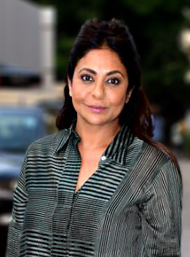
Shah in 2022

Shefali Shah has won multiple national and international awards for her work in film and television.

== Awards and nominations ==
Award	Year	Category	Work	Result	Ref.
Alberto Sordi Family Award	2022	International cultural figure		Won	
Asian Academy Creative Awards	2019	Best Actress in a Leading Role	Delhi Crime (S1)	Won	
Bollywood Hungama Style Icons	2023	Most Stylish Ott Entertainer	—	Nominated	
Critics’ Choice Film Awards, India	2023	Best Supporting Actress	Darlings	Won	
Filmfare Awards	1999	Best Actress (Critics)	Satya	Won	
Filmfare Awards	1999	Best Supporting Actress	Satya	Nominated	
Filmfare Awards	2006	Best Supporting Actress	Waqt: The Race Against Time	Nominated	
Filmfare Awards	2016	Best Supporting Actress	Dil Dhadakne Do	Nominated	
Filmfare Awards	2018	Best Actress in a Short Film	Juice	Won	
Filmfare Awards	2023	Best Supporting Actress	Doctor G	Nominated	
FOI Online Awards	2019	Best Actress in a Leading Role	Once Again	Nominated	
FOI Online Awards	2016	Special Mention	Dil Dhadakne Do	Won	
Indo German Filmweek Awards	2023	Best Actress	Three of Us	Won	
Indian Film Festival of Melbourne	2022	Best Actress	Jalsa	Won	
International Emmy Awards	2023	Best Actress	Delhi Crime (S2)	Nominated	
International Indian Film Academy Awards	2023	Best Actress	Darlings	Nominated	
International Police Award Arts Festival Premio Apoxiomeno	2022	Best Actress	Delhi Crime (Season 1)	Won	
iReel Awards	2019	Best Actress in a Drama Series	Delhi Crime (S1)	Won	
National Film Awards	2009	Best Supporting Actress	The Last Lear	Won	
New York Indian Film Festival	2023	Best Actress	Three of Us	Won	
Producers Guild Film Awards	2008	Best Actress in a Supporting Role	Gandhi, My Father	Nominated	
Screen Awards	1999	Best Supporting Actress	Satya	Won	
Screen Awards	2006	Best Supporting Actress	Waqt: The Race Against Time	Nominated	
Screen Awards	2008	Best Supporting Actress	Gandhi, My Father	Nominated	
Screen Awards	2016	Best Ensemble Cast	Dil Dhadakne Do	Won	
Stardust Awards	2006	Best Supporting Actress	Waqt: The Race Against Time	Won	
Stardust Awards	2008	Best Supporting Actress	Gandhi, My Father	Nominated	
Stardust Awards	2016	Best Supporting Actress	Dil Dhadakne Do	Won	
Times of India Film Awards	2016	Best Supporting Actress	Dil Dhadakne Do	Nominated	
Tokyo Film Festival	2008	Best Actress	Gandhi, My Father	Won	
Zee Cine Awards	1999	Best Actor in a Supporting Role – Female	Satya	Nominated	
Zee Cine Awards	2006	Best Supporting Actress	Waqt: The Race Against Time	Nominated	
Zee Cine Awards	2008	Best Actress (Critics)	Gandhi, My Father	Won	
