= Shefali =

Shefali is a given name and a surname. Notable people with the name include:

- Shefali Alvares (born 1983), Indian playback singer
- Shefali Chowdhury (born 1988), British actress
- Shefali Razdan Duggal (born 1971), Indian-American US ambassador to the Netherlands
- Shefali Ghosh (1941–2006), Bangladeshi music artist
- Shefali Jariwala (1982–2025), Indian actress and model
- Shefali Momtaz, Bangladesh Awami League politician and MP
- Shefali Oza (born 1967), British TV personality and weather presenter
- Shefali Rana, Indian television and film actress
- Shefali Shah (born 1973), Indian actress of film, television and theatre
- Shefali Sharma, Indian actress
- Dolly Shefali, Bangladeshi national women kabaddi player
- Habiba Rahman Khan Shefali, Bangladesh Awami League politician and MP
- Khadiza Khatun Shefali, Bangladesh Awami League politician and former MP
- Miss Shefali (1944–2020), Indian Bengali actress and dancer

== See also ==
- List of awards and nominations received by Shefali Shah
- Shefali Shah filmography
- Shivali
