= Kucch Luv Jaisaa =

- Directed by: Barnali Ray Shukla
- Screenplay by: Barnali Ray Shukla
- Story by: Barnali Ray Shukla
- Produced by: Vipul Amrutlal Shah
- Starring: Shefali Shah; Rahul Bose
- Cinematography: Bobby Singh
- Edited by: Hemanti Sarkar
- Music by: Pritam
- Production company: Sunshine Pictures Pvt. Ltd
- Release date: 27 May 2011
- Running time: 125 minutes
- Country: India
- Language: Hindi

Kucch Luv Jaisaa (transl. Something like love) is a 2011 Indian drama film. Written and directed by Barnali Shukla, the film stars Shefali Shah and Rahul Bose. Kucch Luv Jaisaa marks the second film that Bose and Shah have acted in together; they also played a married couple in Aparna Sen's 15 Park Avenue (2005). Model Neetu Chandra and television actor Sumeet Raghavan are also in the film. The music is by Pritam.

== Plot ==
A busy housewife and mother, Madhu Saxena is upset when her husband forgets her birthday. As it is on 29 February, her birthday only comes once every four years. She decides to go shopping to celebrate the day and buys a car as well. While resting in a cafe she meets Raghav, a mysterious stranger who she thinks is a private detective. He does not dissuade her from the idea because he is really a wanted forger who has been turned in to the police by his girlfriend Ria. Needing cover until he can leave Mumbai, Raghav pretends to be following an unfaithful husband who is planning to murder his wife. He agrees to accept Madhu's help on the imaginary case. As they pursue the non-existent husband they begin to feel attracted to each other. Events become more complicated when Madhu realizes that he is not a detective and that he has been deceiving her. Finally, Raghav decides to give himself up to the police and Madhu returns to her family.

== Cast ==
- Shefali Shah as Madhu Saxena
- Rahul Bose as Raghav Passport
- Sumeet Raghavan as Shravan Saxena, Madhu's Husband
- Nitu Chandra as Ria
- Manmeet Singh as Company Manager
- Khurshed Lawyer as a Restaurant Waiter
- Om Puri as Madhu's Father
- Kunal Kumar
- Amin Hajee

== Production ==
Shefali Shah's husband Vipul Amrutlal Shah agreed to serve as the film's producer as a congratulatory gift to her for winning a National Award for The Last Lear. For her role in Kucch Luv Jaisaa she lost several kilos, dieting and following a strict regimen. She also spent a day in jail with a convicted criminal and talked to his family to get a feel for the role. After rumours of bickering on the set were reported in the press, Shah admitted that she had arguments with Rahul Bose during filming, "but it was nothing serious". The arguments were later revealed to be over her stay in jail because Rahul Bose was worried for her safety.

== Soundtrack ==
Kucch Luv Jaisaa

Soundtrack album by Pritam
- Released: 8 May 2011
- Length: 35:57
- Language: Hindi
- Label: T-Series
- Producer: Pritam

Pritam chronology
Dum Maaro Dum (2011)	Kucch Luv Jaisaa (2011)	Ready (2011)

Pritam composed the music and lyrics were penned by Irshad Kamil.

#	Title	Singer(s)	Length
1	"Naina"	Mohit Chauhan, Monali Thakur	5:30
2	"Thoda Sa Pyaar"	Sunidhi Chauhan, Anupam Amod	4:52
3	"Badal Pe Paaon"	Mannan Shah	4:19
4	"Khwab" (Rock)	Nikhil D'Souza	4:41
5	"Thoda Sa Pyaar" (Raghav’s Search for Love)	Mannan Shah	5:31
6	"Khwab" (Raghav’s Confession)	Nikhil D'Souza	5:13
7	"Thoda Sa Pyaar" (Madhu’s Search for Love)	Naresh Iyer, Shefali Alvaris	5:31

== Reception ==
=== Critical reception ===
Movie Kucch Luv Jaisaa attracted negative reviews from various critics. Nikhat Kazmi of Times of India rated it with 2.5 out of 5 stars and said - "the lady seems to be so gullible and so easy to fool, it does seem unreal. It takes her eternity to realize her companion's true identity, even though the television keeps blaring out the truth. The duo try hard, but the romance never does light up the screen. Nor do the private lives of the mismatched couple throw up enticing moments that could hold the script together". Shubha Shetty-Saha of MidDay wrote, "While busy yawning through this two-hour plus movie, I kept wondering, which women are they talking about? Is there a woman who gets so excited at the sight of a detective that she follows him into a hotel room? Is there a woman out there who thinks she has found some purpose in life, only if she struts around in high heels? If these women do exist, I am glad I haven't met them yet. Oh yes, the music was hummable and lyrics were nice."
