= Happy Birthday Mummyji =

Indian Hindi-language Short film

- Directed by: Shefali Shah
- Written by: Shefali Shah
- Produced by: Lalit Prem Sharma
- Starring: Shefali Shah
- Cinematography: Eeshit Narain
- Edited by: Antara Lahiri
- Music by: Prasad S.
- Distributed by: Royal Stag Barrel Select Large Short Films
- Release date: 23 July 2021
- Running time: 14 minutes
- Country: India
- Language: Hindi

Happy Birthday Mummyji is a 2021 Indian Hindi-language drama short film written and directed by Shefali Shah, who stars as the single character in the film, and produced by Sunshine Pictures.

== Plot ==
The story of a woman who is recognised by her relationships with other people, preparing a birthday party.

== Production ==
In 2020, Shah decided to experiment with writing and directing in two self-starring COVID-19-based short films, Someday and Happy Birthday Mummyji. In Someday, which marked her directorial debut, she played a frontline healthcare worker who returns home for a seven-day quarantine due to the pandemic and spends time interacting through a door with her elderly mother, who has Alzheimer's disease. Shah wrote the script of Happy Birthday Mummy Ji drawing upon her own life experiences and believed her central character in it "represents all the women you know".

== Themes ==
A single-character film, the film addresses themes of loneliness, female desire. Shah said about the film: "I believe it is a story from my life, my friends, my mom's. It is perhaps the need to tell that we have reached a point of desperation and would just like to let go."

== Release ==
The film was released on 23 July 2021 by Royal Stag Barrel Select Large Short Films.

== Reception ==
=== Critical response ===
The film opened to positive reviews and attracted some notice for a masturbation scene played by Shah.
