= Someday (2021 film) =

Indian Hindi-language Short film

- Directed by: Shefali Shah
- Written by: Shefali Shah
- Starring: Shefali Shah
- Cinematography: Eeshit Narain
- Edited by: Antara Lahiri
- Music by: Prasad S.
- Release dates: April 2021 (51st USA Film Festival July 2021 (18th Indian Film Festival Stuttgart)
- Running time: 10 minutes
- Country: India
- Language: Hindi

Someday is a 2021 Indian Hindi-language drama short film written and directed by Shefali Shah, who stars in the lead role.

== Plot ==
A frontline healthcare worker who returns home for a seven-day quarantine due to the COVID pandemic and spends time interacting through a door with her elderly mother, who has Alzheimer's disease.

== Production ==
In 2020, Shah decided to experiment with writing and directing in two self-starring COVID-19-based short films, Someday and Happy Birthday Mummy Ji. Someday marked her directorial debut, and Shah conceived the story based on memories from her mother who had turned caregiver to her grandmother, and shot the film with a five-member crew at her residence over a period of two days.

== Release ==
The film premiered at the 51st USA Film Festival and was later screened at the 18th Indian Film Festival Stuttgart in Germany. In September 2021, it was screened at the Bollywood Festival in Norway.

== Reception ==
=== Critical response ===
A critic from Cinestaan wrote that "As the sole artiste in the film, Shah poignantly portrays the pain, grief and emotional turmoil of seeing one's parent slip slowly away into dementia".
