= Archies Limited =

Indian retailer of greetings cards and gifts private limited

Archies Ltd

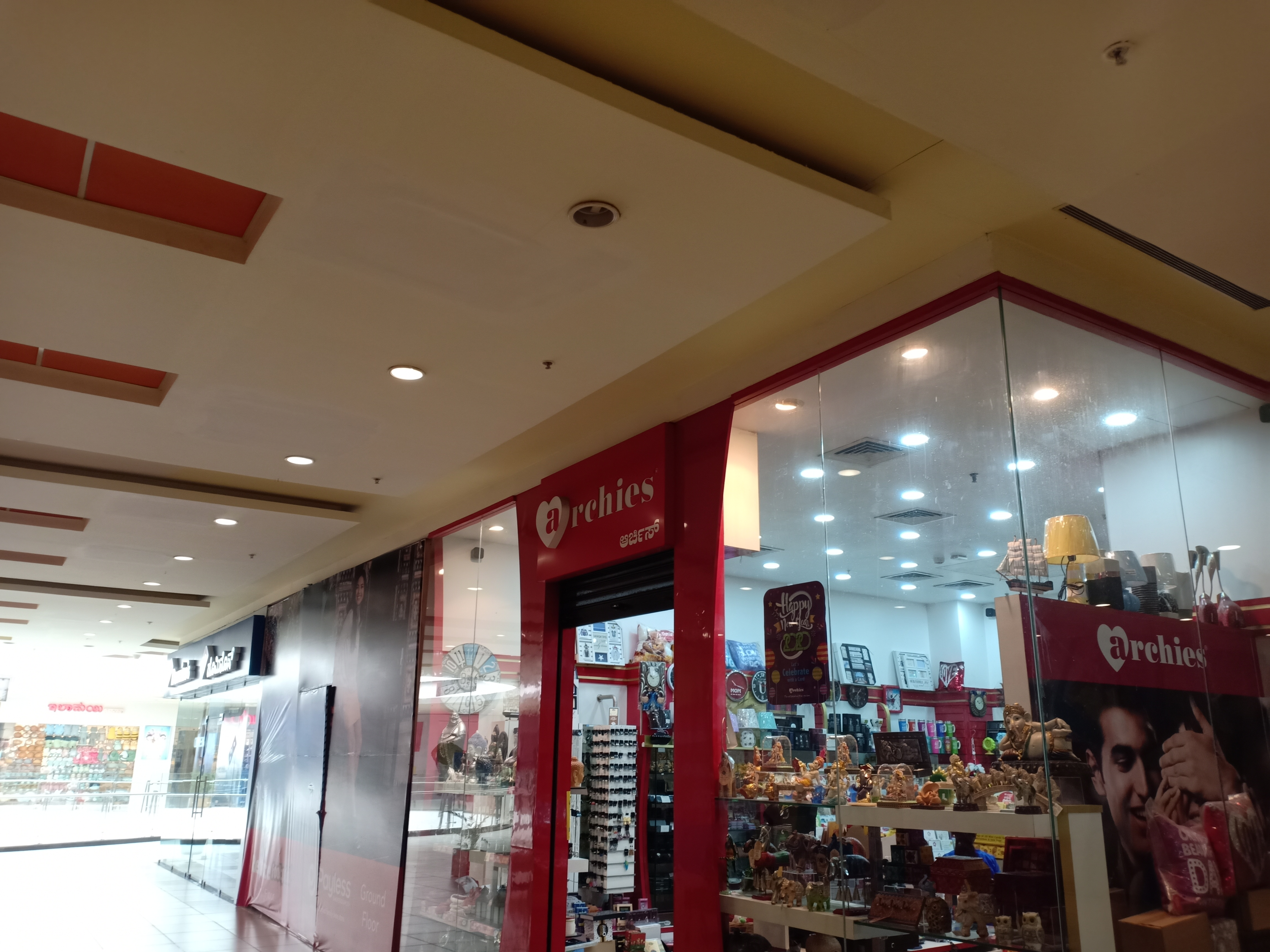
- Type: Public
- Traded as: BSE: 532212; NSE: ARCHIES
- ISIN: INE731A01020
- Industry: Greeting cards
- Founded: 1979; 47 years ago
- Founder: Anil Moolchandani / Jagdish Moolchandani
- Headquarters: New Delhi, India
- Area served: Worldwide
- Revenue: ▼₹77.88 crore (US$8.1 million) (2021)
- Operating income: ▼₹3.43 crore (US$360,000) (2021)
- Net income: ▼₹−2.39 crore (US$−250,000) (2021)
- Total assets: ▼₹189.93 crore (US$20 million) (2021)
- Total equity: ▼₹107.58 crore (US$11 million) (2021)
- Website: www.archiesonline.com

Archies Limited (earlier called Archies Greetings and Gifts Ltd) is an Indian multinational retailer of greeting cards and gifts, based in New Delhi.

== History ==
Founded in 1979 by Anil Moolchandani, the company initially sold song books, posters and leather patches. The company's main product, greeting cards, was introduced in 1980. Cards were introduced for major Indian festivals such as Holi, Diwali and Rakhi, apart from the usual new year, birthday and anniversary occasions. The company went public in 1995. In 1998, it was listed on the National Stock Exchange of India and Bombay Stock Exchange.

Archies Limited is in the business of manufacturing and selling greeting cards and other social expression products such as gifts and posters. Archies has a market share of about 50% of India's greeting cards market.

== Outlets and Stores ==
Archies has about 250+ franchise and 230+ exclusive outlets, called Archies Galleries, spread across 120 cities and 6 countries. It has tie-ups and licensing arrangements for merchandising characters such as Dennis the Menace and Disney characters. It has arrangements with Paramount Cards Inc., Anne Geddes, and American Greetings, for greeting card design and name use.

== Expansion ==
Following the increasing popularity of e-cards, Archies started its online portal in 2000. The company expanded its product range to include artificial jewelry, crystal ware, chocolates and perfumes, and accordingly changed its name to Archies Limited in 2002.
