= Shefali Shah =

Indian film actress (born 1973)

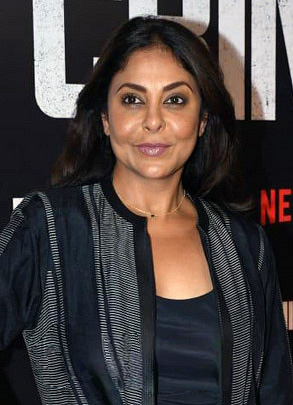
- Shah in 2022
- Born: Shefali Shetty; 22 May 1973 (age 53); Mumbai, Maharashtra, India
- Occupation: Actress
- Years active: 1993–present
- Works: Full list
- Spouses: Harsh Chhaya (m. 1994; div. 2000) Vipul Amrutlal Shah (m. 2000)
- Children: 2
- Awards: Full list

Shefali Shah (née Shetty; born 22 May 1973) is an Indian actress of film, television and theatre. Working primarily in independent Hindi films, she has received multiple local and foreign accolades for her performances. Shah's acting career started on the Gujarati stage before she debuted on television in 1993. After small parts on television and a brief stint with cinema in Rangeela (1995), she gained wider recognition in 1997 for her role in the popular series Hasratein. This was followed by lead roles in the TV series Kabhie Kabhie (1997) and Raahein (1999). A supporting role in the crime film Satya (1998) won her positive notice and a Filmfare Critics Award, and she soon shifted her focus to film acting starting with a lead role in the Gujarati drama Dariya Chhoru (1999).

Shah was selective about her roles through the following decades, resulting in intermittent film work, mostly in character parts and often to appreciation from critics. She appeared in the international co-production Monsoon Wedding (2001) and the mainstream comedy-drama Waqt: The Race Against Time (2005). In 2007, her portrayal of Kasturba Gandhi in the biographical drama Gandhi, My Father won her the Best Actress prize at the Tokyo International Film Festival, and she received the National Film Award for Best Supporting Actress for the drama film The Last Lear. Among her subsequent film roles, she played a leading part in Kucch Luv Jaisaa (2011) and was noted for her work in the social problem film Lakshmi (2014) and the ensemble drama Dil Dhadakne Do (2015).

Shah's career surged in the late 2010s as she transitioned to leading roles. She won a Filmfare Short Film Award for her performance in Juice (2017) and followed with two Netflix projects: the romantic drama Once Again (2018) and the crime series Delhi Crime (2019). Her performance as DCP Vartika Chaturvedi in the latter met with widespread acclaim. Five 2022 projects, including the Disney+ Hotstar series Human, the feature dramas Jalsa and Darlings, as well as the second season of Delhi Crime, brought Shah further recognition. The last of these earned her a nomination for the International Emmy Award for Best Actress, and she won a second Filmfare Critics Award for playing a woman with early onset dementia in Three of Us (2023).

== Early life ==
Shefali Shah was born as Shefali Shetty on 22 May 1973 in Mumbai. She is the only child of Mangalorean Sudhakar Shetty, a banker at Reserve Bank of India (RBI), and his Gujarati wife Shobha, a homeopathy practitioner. The family resided in Santa Cruz, Mumbai at the RBI quarters, where she attended Arya Vidya Mandir School. Shah is fluent in Tulu, Hindi, English, Marathi, and Gujarati.

While she was inclined to the arts as a child, including singing and dancing (she is trained in Bharatanatyam), she did not find particular interest in acting. Her first stint with acting happened on Gujarati stage when she was 10; her school teacher's playwright husband asked Shah's mother if she would permit her daughter to play a character based on Damien Thorn from The Omen (1976). Shah played the part with her mother's consent, and did not act again until several years later. After her schooling, she enrolled at Mithibai College in Vile Parle, opting to study science, but spent most of her student days working in theatre.

== Career ==
=== Early theatre and television work (1990–1996) ===
Shah's acting career began with work in inter-collegiate plays in Gujarati during the early 1990s. Her work included roles in several stage dramas including Ant Vagarni Antakshari and Doctor Tame Pan?. A 1995 piece by Rasa magazine reported that Shah had proved her abilities to become one of the stars of Gujarati theatre. In one of the plays, she was brought to the attention of a team member of the TV serial Campus (1993) who suggested that she audition for a part in it. She was accepted following a screen test. This was followed by several other serials, including the popular Zee TV shows Tara and Banegi Apni Baat (both 1993–1997), as well as Naya Nukkad (1993–1994) on Doordarshan and Daraar (1994–1995) on Zee TV.

The year 1995 marked Shah's first film appearance with a brief role in Ram Gopal Varma's Rangeela. A few days into shooting, she realised the part was different from what she was set up for, and she walked out of the sets as she felt cheated. Shah was reluctant to work in motion pictures after that, and the roles she was offered were mostly small character parts. She continued working in TV series, including Balaji Telefilms' Mano Ya Na Mano (1995–1999) and Doordarshan's Aarohan (1996–1997) and Sea Hawks (1997–1998). An anthology horror series, Mano Ya Na Mano starred Shah opposite Durga Jasraj in an episode titled "Kabzaa", directed by Homi Wadia, which was developed into a full-fledged serial called Kavach in 2016. Arohan, starring and produced by Pallavi Joshi, tells the story of a woman who joins the Indian Navy.

=== Breakthrough with Hasratein and Satya (1997–1999) ===
In 1997, Shah replaced Seema Kapoor in the Zee TV series Hasratein (1996–1999) after over 120 episodes. In her first lead role, Shah starred as Savi, a married woman involved in an extramarital affair with a married man. Based on the Marathi novel Adhantari by Jaywant Dalvi, the show was popular with audiences and attracted attention for its commentary on the institution of marriage. India Today describes it as "one of the prime productions that changed the face of Indian television". The character of Savi, a mature woman with grown up children, was significantly older in age than Shah. Given the age differences, she had to persuade director Ajay Sinha to cast her. Bhavya Sadhwani of IndiaTimes attributed the show's success with viewers mainly to the "impeccable acting skills" demonstrated by Shah in the part. The serial gained wider public recognition for Shah, and she called it a milestone in her career. Her performance earned her the Zee Woman of the Year award in 1997. Another lead role was given to her in Mahesh Bhatt's weekend soap Kabhie Kabhie (1997), which aired on StarPlus.

In 1998, she was offered a small part in Ram Gopal Varma's crime thriller Satya, which revolves around the Mumbai underworld. Having been disappointed in her previous collaboration with Varma on Rangeela, she was hesitant on accepting it but eventually relented as she found the part special and made sure to receive thorough information about it. In a seven-minute role, she played Pyaari Mhatre, the wife of a mafia gangster played by Manoj Bajpayee. Their roles were said to be modelled after Arun Gawli and his wife Asha. Shah said she instinctively recognised her part and knew exactly how to play it. Satya opened to commercial success and major critical acclaim, and Shah's performance in it was favourably reviewed. Anupama Chopra of India Today wrote that Shah and her co-actors "are so good that you can almost smell the Mumbai grime on their sweaty bodies". For her portrayal, Shah won the Screen Award for Best Supporting Actress. At the 44th Filmfare Awards, she was nominated for the Filmfare Award for Best Supporting Actress and was awarded the Critics Award for Best Actress.

Despite the positive reaction to her work in Satya, Shah did not receive as many film offers as she expected. Following Hasratein, she starred in its successor on Zee TV's prime-time spot, the soap opera Raahein (1999). The show was met with approval from viewers and critics alike. She played Preeti, a woman caught between her love life and career ambitions. In contrast to Shah's previous roles, the character of Preeti was 22 years old. Shailaja Bajpai of The Indian Express commended Shah's acting talent but thought she was less suitable for such a young-aged part, concluding that she is "brilliantly miscast". During this period she was one of the co-hosts on the musical game show Antakshari opposite Annu Kapoor. Among other projects on television, she acted in several episodes of the anthology series Rishtey (1999–2001), including the well-received "Highway".

In 1999, she was cast in a Gujarati film, Dariya Chhoru, made by her future husband Vipul Shah. A love story situated on the coast of Saurashtra between a poor man (Jamnadas Majethia) and a wealthy woman (Shah), the film was named Best Film at the Gujarat State Film Awards, where Shah won the Best Actress award. The film, which The Times of India said should cater to educated Gujarati viewers, was a box-office success. According to the book Routledge Handbook of Indian Cinemas, it was among the films that started a trend of larger productions in the Gujarati film industry. In the book Gujarat: A Panorama of the Heritage of Gujarat, the film was praised for its beautiful portrayal and Shah and her colleagues were hailed as screen artistes who "could create fresh hopes among the film goers in Gujarat".

=== Recognition for character roles (2000–2007) ===
Shah's work in the 2000s started with a short appearance in Aditya Chopra's 2000 romance Mohabbatein. A year later, she was cast in Mira Nair's international co-production Monsoon Wedding, (Note: The film was coproduced by India, USA, France, Germany, and Italy.) a comedy-drama which chronicles the reunion of a large Punjabi family for a wedding. Shah played Rhea Verma, an orphaned young woman, aspiring writer and a survivor of child sexual abuse, a character she considered as the most complex in the film. The film opened to considerable international acclaim, receiving the Golden Lion at the 58th Venice International Film Festival and nominations for Best Foreign Language Film at the BAFTA and Golden Globe Awards. Elvis Mitchell of The New York Times singled out Shah's part, and Saibal Chatterjee of Hindustan Times wrote that she "taps into the depths of a difficult character with amazing ease". The film was a significant box-office success, earning over $33 million against its $1.2‑million budget.

Shah worked again under her husband Vipul's direction in the family melodrama Waqt: The Race Against Time (2005), playing Amitabh Bachchan's wife and Akshay Kumar's mother. She was considered for the part following Bachchan's suggestion against her husband's hesitation. Her casting in the role of a middle-aged mother to Kumar, who in reality is five years her senior, attracted considerable media coverage. She defended her choice of the part, saying she admired the character's traits and found particular challenge in the significant age differences. Her portrayal of Sumitra Thakur, a strict mother who encourages her husband to take extreme measures to discipline their irresponsible son, earned her a second Filmfare nomination for Best Supporting Actress. Derek Elley of Variety and Ziya Us Salam of The Hindu commended her subtle and composed acting, and Subhash K. Jha of The Times of India argued that "it's Shefali Shah as Amitabh Bachchan's wife whose expressive eyes conveying spousal and matriarchal pain that you come home with". She followed with a role in Aparna Sen's English-language drama 15 Park Avenue (2005).

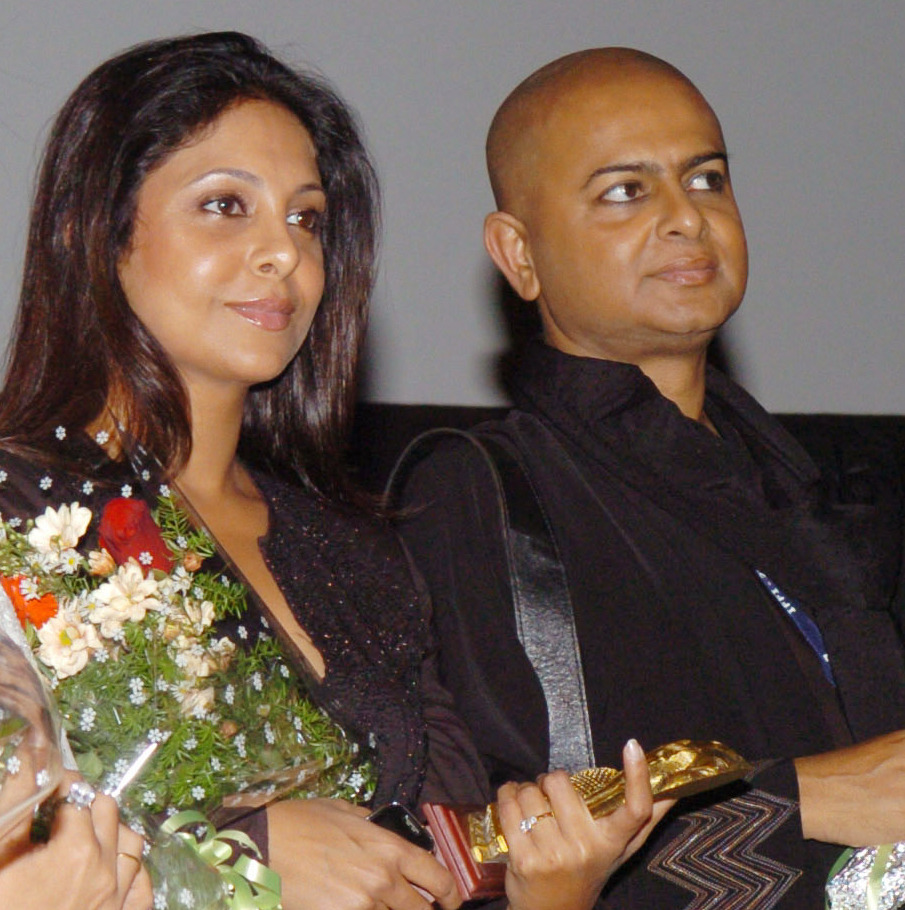
Shah with director Rituparno Ghosh at an event for The Last Lear in 2007

In 2007, Shah was lauded for her work in two films: Feroz Abbas Khan's biographical film Gandhi, My Father and Rituparno Ghosh's English-language film-within-a-film drama The Last Lear. An Indo-British co-production, Gandhi, My Father features Shah in the role of Kasturba Gandhi, who is torn by the lifelong conflict between her husband Mahatma Gandhi and son Hiralal (played by Darshan Jariwala and Akshaye Khanna, respectively). Portraying the character from Kasturba's early adulthood to old age, Shah lost weight to look the part. Khalid Mohamed of Hindustan Times called her performance "magnificent" and Roshmila Bhattacharya of Screen described her as "brilliant, her sparkling glances, eloquent silences and drooping shoulders effectively conveying the hopelessness and helplessness of a parent whose child has gone astray". She was awarded the Best Actress prize at the Tokyo International Film Festival and the Critics Award for Best Actor – Female at the 2008 Zee Cine Awards.

The Last Lear revolves around a Shakespearean theatre actor (played by Amitabh Bachchan). Shah played his troubled and irritable caregiver and live-in partner, a role she considered her best yet, alongside Preity Zinta and Divya Dutta. The film premiered at the 2007 Toronto International Film Festival where it was well received. Rajeev Masand of IBN Live wrote of "the manner she goes from spiteful to soothing" throughout the film, and Sukanya Verma of Rediff.com took note of Shah's commanding presence. The film was named Best Feature Film in English at the 55th National Film Awards, where Shah won the Best Supporting Actress award for what was cited by the jury as an "aggressive portrayal of a Bengali housewife who in time becomes more tolerant of her aging husband's many eccentric guests".

=== Intermittent work on stage and screen (2008–2016) ===
"Those who have not seen Shefali Shah on stage have missed seeing one of the best live performers in this country. For the entire length of a two-hour play she draws the audience in, making them believe her story is part of their story too, that her pain is something they feel too."

— Authors Sunil Kant Munjal and S.K. Rai on Shah's performance in Bas Itna Sa Khwab (2010)

Subhash Ghai's crime thriller Black & White (2008) stars Shah as Roma Mathur, a Bengali activist and the wife of an Urdu professor (Anil Kapoor). The film follows the couple's acquaintance with a disguised Islamic fundamentalist plotting a suicide attack at the Red Fort. It generated mixed reviews and so did Shah's performance, which Khalid Mohamed found to be "unusually hammy". Two years later, in view of the lack of substantial film work that would realise her acting potential, Shah's husband Vipul cast her in his Hindi stage production Bas Itna Sa Khwab, directed by Chandrakant Kulkarni. Based on Kulkarni's Marathi play Dhyanimani, it marked Shah's return to the stage after a decade and saw her in the role of a middle-class housewife opposite Kiran Karmarkar. The production travelled from Mumbai's Rangsharda to Ludhiana's Sanskritik Samagam, to Dubai. She spoke of her acting experience on stage, recounting her full involvement with her character: "I have to literally break down every time, then collect the pieces and put them back together again." Authors Sunil Kant Munjal and S.K. Rai, in the book All the World is a Stage, lavished praise on her performance.

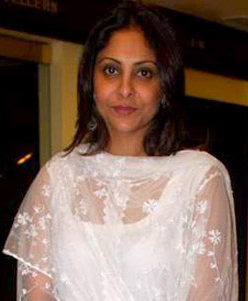
Shah in 2012

After appearing as a psychiatrist in the thriller Karthik Calling Karthik in 2010, Shah was cast in the lead part of her husband's production Kucch Luv Jaisaa the following year. She played a young housewife who spends a romantic day with a criminal on the run from prison (Rahul Bose). To prepare for the part, Shah visited the Thane Jail and interacted with prisoners to attain better understanding of her character's experience. The film opened to a lukewarm critical response, with critics Subhash K. Jha and Mihir Fadnavis observing that Shah struggles with material that was written with little conviction. Her efforts were better received by Mayank Shekhar, who found her "startlingly expressive" and commended her for exuding "the kind of vulnerability and warmth that's rare to match". After three years of absence from the screen, Shah returned as Jyoti, a brothel madam in Nagesh Kukunoor's 2014 social problem film Lakshmi, alongside Monali Thakur. Based on the true story of a teenager who is kidnapped and sold into a brothel in Hyderabad, Lakshmi released to a positive critical reception for its harshly realistic depiction human trafficking and child prostitution. Sudhish Kamath appreciated Shah's performance in a complex role.

In 2015, Shah starred in Zoya Akhtar's comedy-drama Dil Dhadakne Do alongside Anil Kapoor as her husband, and Priyanka Chopra and Ranveer Singh as her children. The story is about a wealthy, dysfunctional family who embark on a cruise to celebrate the 30th wedding anniversary of the parents; Shah played Neelam Mehra, the passive-aggressive matriarch caught in a marriage of convenience and hiding her eating disorder. Shah loved the script and the character but was initially apprehensive about accepting another part of a middle-aged woman and playing a mother to Chopra and Singh; she eventually relented on her husband's advice. Dil Dhadakne Do was one of the highest-grossing Hindi films of 2015. A scene where an emotionally collapsing Neelam is seen binging on a cake in front of the mirror was particularly noted by critics. Subhash K. Jha found Shah's performance the most effective of the ensemble cast, arguing she "brings to her character an unfussy pitch-perfection rarely seen in mainstream cinema". She received her third Best Supporting Actress Filmfare nomination for the film, and was awarded the Stardust Award for Best Supporting Actress as well as a Screen Award for Best Ensemble Cast along with her co-stars in the film.

In Brothers (2015), Karan Malhotra's remake of the American sports drama Warrior (2011), Shah had a minor supporting role. Her character Maria Fernandes is presented in flashbacks as a woman who accepts the child her adulterous husband had out of wedlock. The film generated mixed-to-negative reviews; Vishal Menon of The Hindu thought she had a role which required copious crying but The Hollywood Reporter found her performance heartbreaking. Shah voiced the character of Raksha in the Hindi version of the Disney live-action feature The Jungle Book (2016). She next played the fictional part of India's Minister of Home Affairs Leena Chowdhury in the action thriller Commando 2: The Black Money Trail.

=== Critical acclaim in leading roles (2017–present) ===
In 2017, Shah acted in Juice, a short film about gender inequality in middle-class Indian families. Directed by Neeraj Ghaywan, it stars Shah as Manju Singh, a woman who, after hours spent in the kitchen, acts in defiance of her inconsiderate husband. The film and Shah's performance received favourable reviews. Critics noted her ability to communicate emotions through gestures and expressions; Kriti Tulsiani wrote that Shah's "unfazed gazes convey more than words will ever say". The film won two Filmfare Short Film Awards at the 63rd Filmfare Awards: Best Film (fiction) and Best Actress for Shah. In years to follow, she credited Juice as the first of several films that helped propel her career forward. In Once Again (2018), an Indo-German Netflix romance film, Shah was cast in the lead as a widowed middle-aged restaurateur who falls in love with an ageing film star played by Neeraj Kabi. Shah said she had long-awaited a film of the sort, describing herself as "an incurable romantic". She received compliments for her performance, and her chemistry with Kabi drew positive notice. Deepa Gahlot of Financial Chronicle appreciated the film's subtlety and took note of Shah's expressive eyes revealing her inner state, an opinion shared by other critics.

"Each episode [in Delhi Crime] moves along at a lightning fast pace and at the centre of it is the brilliant Shefali Shah, who is like a tornado that blows through every scene and leaves a permanent mark. It needed a great actress to bring the writing to life and Shefali more than delivers in what is one of the finest performances you will see this year."

— Priya Mulji of Eastern Eye on Shah's performance in Delhi Crime (2019)

Shah's second collaboration with Netflix took place in the 2019 procedural miniseries Delhi Crime, which was written and directed by Richie Mehta. Based on the aftermath of the 2012 Delhi gang rape, the show stars Shah as Vartika Chaturvedi, a South Delhi Deputy Commissioner of Police (DCP) who is assigned to investigate a brutal gang rape in Delhi. The character was modelled after former Delhi DCP Chhaya Sharma. Shah found the part "emotionally, physically, mentally" consuming and would often interact with Sharma throughout filming to learn more about the character. The series opened to universally positive reviews from critics, and Shah's performance met with widespread acclaim. Dorothy Rabinowitz of The Wall Street Journal commended Shah for "a movingly understated and complex performance" and Namrata Joshi of The Hindu wrote: "Shah is on top of her game, conflicted yet sure of herself, vulnerable but strong, swayed by emotions yet never giving in to them, bristling equally with anger, concern, disappointments and dejection." Delhi Crime was named Best Drama Series at the 48th International Emmy Awards, and won four Asian Academy Creative Awards, including Best Drama Series and Best Actress for Shah. She hailed the show as a turning point in her life, saying it reassured filmmakers to cast her in primary parts and heralded the busiest period of her career.

In 2020, Shah experimented with writing and directing in two self-starring COVID-19-based short films, Someday and Happy Birthday Mummyji. In Someday, which marked her directorial debut, she played a frontline healthcare worker who returns home for a seven-day quarantine due to the pandemic and spends time interacting through a door with her elderly mother, who suffers from Alzheimer's disease. Shah conceived the story based on memories from her mother who had turned caregiver to her grandmother, and shot the film with a five-member crew at her residence over a period of two days. The film premiered at the 51st USA Film Festival and was later screened at the 18th Indian Film Festival Stuttgart in Germany. In Happy Birthday Mummyji, she played Suchi, a housewife whose preparations for her mother-in-law's birthday party are halted by a sudden national curfew, leaving her home alone and decisive to make the most of the rare opportunity to spend time on herself. Shah wrote the script drawing upon her own life experiences and believed Suchi "represents all the women you know". A single-character film, it opened to positive reviews and attracted some notice for a masturbation scene played by Shah.

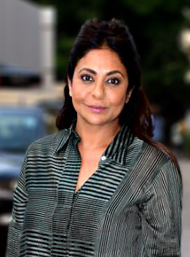
Shah in 2022

The 2021 Netflix original anthology film Ajeeb Daastaans, comprising four short stories, featured Shah in the fourth segment "Ankahi", directed by Kayoze Irani. She played Natasha, an unhappily married woman who struggles with her teenaged daughter's hearing loss and falls in love with a hearing-impaired photographer, played by Manav Kaul. She studied sign language in preparation for the part and revealed to have grown so emotionally invested in the story that it left her heartbroken when filming ended. "Ankahi" was well received by critics, with particular emphasis placed on Shah and Kaul's performances.

In 2022, Shah starred in Human, a medical streaming television series. Directed by her husband for Disney+ Hotstar, the show explores the nexus between pharmaceutical companies and large private hospitals who conduct human trials for new drugs on lower-class citizens. She played Dr. Gauri Nath, a powerful and ruthlessly ambitious neurosurgeon with a traumatic childhood who owns Manthan, a self-founded multi-specialty hospital. Shah found the negative character of Gauri to be unlike anyone she had ever known. Hindustan Times described Gauri as one of the best characters on Indian digital series yet, calling her an "incredibly disturbed sociopath" and "a vicious snake singularly committed to building her business". Critics reacted positively to Shah's turn, noting her composed demeanor and hushed tone in the part.

Later in the year, Shah starred opposite Vidya Balan in the social thriller Jalsa, an Amazon Prime feature film. Her part is that of Rukhsana, a maid whose daughter becomes the victim of a hit-and-run accident. The film opened to a positive response from critics, and Shah received rave reviews for her understated performance. She was named Best Actress at the annual Indian Film Festival of Melbourne. Anuj Kumar of The Hindu commended Shah and her character: "At the cost of repeating oneself, the depth of Shefali's eyes and the emotions that they could hold continues to bewitch and baffle. Her Rukhsana is that vulnerable maid from the margins who makes an attempt to hold on to a life of dignity." In the black comedy Darlings (2022), produced for Netflix, Shah and Alia Bhatt star as a mother and daughter who embark on a revenge plan against the latter's abusive husband. Shubhra Gupta complimented Shah for a "powerful act", and Anna M. M. Vetticad wrote of Shah's effective blend of comedy and drama in the part. Darlings became the highest-viewed non-English Indian original on Netflix. At the 2023 Filmfare OTT Awards, Shah received the Best Supporting Actress award in a Web Original Film for her performance.

August 2022 saw the release of the second season of Delhi Crime, based on the chapter "Moon Gazer" from retired police officer Neeraj Kumar's book Khaki Files. Addressing new themes such as class prejudice, the show opened to positive reviews and Shah again received favourable comments for holding the show together with both power and vulnerability. According to Vogue's Taylor Antrim, Shah is "tremendous in the role" as she "seizes your attention" in her reprisal of Vartika Chaturvedi, who is "intensely serious; fearsome to her subordinates, who call her 'Madam Sir'; and clearly burdened by her job". She received a nomination for the International Emmy Award for Best Actress. Shah next appeared as a strict physician in the medical comedy Doctor G, alongside Ayushmann Khurrana and Rakul Preet Singh, for which she was nominated for the Filmfare Award for Best Supporting Actress.

The drama Three of Us (2023), directed by Avinash Arun, stars Shah as Shailaja, a woman who, after being diagnosed with early-stage dementia, decides to make a trip to revisit her childhood and confront her past. Shah said she had to fully immerse in the story to play the fragility and vulnerable state of the character, which was a departure from her recent parts. Co-starring Swanand Kirkire as her husband and Jaideep Ahlawat as her childhood sweetheart, the film was noted by critics, who highlighted the performances of the three leads. Prateek Sur of Outlook described Three of Us as the best film of the year, calling it "a masterpiece in acting". Udita Jhunjhunwala of Mint observed: "Shah opts to play Shailaja with childlike awe and wonder. It’s a curious choice, but the actress owns it." Her performance earned her a second Filmfare Critics Award for Best Actress (shared with Rani Mukerji for Mrs. Chatterjee vs Norway).

In 2025, Shah returned for the third season of Delhi Crime, which follows her character's investigation of a human-trafficking case inspired by the 2012 death of Baby Falak. The season opened to mostly positive reviews and so did Shah's reprisal of Vartika Chaturvedi, now promoted to Deputy Inspector General of Police (DIG). The Times of India's Archika Khurana wrote that Shah "once again, anchors the narrative with unmatched gravitas", arguing that through her portrayal, Vartika emerges as "a woman of steel, yet one whose eyes betray exhaustion, compassion, and controlled fury". She will next reteam with Jaideep Ahlawat in the thriller Hisaab, produced by her husband.

== Personal life ==
Shah was married to television actor Harsh Chhaya from 1994 to 2000. In December 2000, she married director Vipul Amrutlal Shah, with whom she has two sons, Aryaman and Maurya.

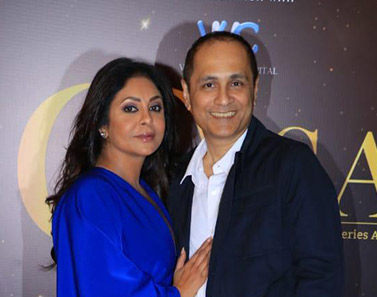
Shah with her husband Vipul Shah in 2019

In addition to acting, Shah is fond of painting and cooking. Finding painting therapeutic, she says it gives her the creative outlet she craves when not acting in films. She trained for six months at Last Ship, an artists' residency in Bandra, and in 2016 took a course at Metàfora, an art school in Barcelona, Spain. Working mostly with acrylic on canvas as well as charcoal and ink, Shah focuses on perspective art, namely "the marriage of perspective with architectural designs" of places she has visited. She cites Mark Rothko and Jackson Pollock as her sources of inspiration. One of her paintings was on display at Jehangir Art Gallery in Mumbai at an exhibition held by Art for Concern, where it was eventually sold, while a solo show at The Monalisa Kalagram in Pune in 2017 was, by her own admission, unsuccessful.

In 2021, Shah opened a restaurant named Jalsa in Ahmedabad, Gujarat, which serves Indian and international cuisines and offers customers different cultural and recreational activities, from pottery and henna decoration to musical performances such as Garba. She directly supervises its cuisine, some of which is based on her home recipes, as well as decor, having designed some of its interiors, including walls hand-painted by her. The restaurant's second outlet was opened in Bangalore, and was positively reviewed by Lifestyle Asia.

== Artistry and reception ==
"I genuinely feel that, if I can say something in four words, I won't use eight; If I can say something in two words, I won't use four; and if I can say it without using a word, I will do it."

— Shah explaining her approach to film acting and her preference for minimal use of words

Shah has been described by critics and the media as one of India's finest actresses. Describing herself as an instinctive actor, she has confessed to not approaching acting as a craft but rather becoming a person and living each character's struggle, which often proves taxing. She explained her technique: "Every role takes away a part of me. It's exhausting, it drains me completely, and then enriches me. It's a cycle, but I don't know any other way". Known for her understated acting style, Shah has been noted for her big, expressive eyes and her ability to emote through minimal facial expressions and gestures, and often through silence. Devansh Sharma described Shah's use of silence as "a leitmotif in all her performances", and Sneha Bengani commented: "Shah has always thrived in silences. Through them, she communicates with easy effortlessness what words almost always fail to." In view of her preference for minimalism, she has gained a reputation for asking directors to cut her lines and scenes. Shah explains that cinema being a powerful visual medium which captures actors' faces, sometimes not much spoken text is required and is often redundant. Due to her eagerness to be thoroughly versed in details about her scripts and parts, Shah often keeps badgering her directors with questions during filming.

Highly selective about her roles and unwilling to compromise her artistic integrity, Shah chooses parts by instinct and maintains that unless completely consumed by a project, she will not commit to it. She does not give importance to the length of a role, but more "the mettle, the potency and the relevance" it has in the film. Some of Shah's characters throughout her career were of women older than herself. Her first roles on television when she was in her early twenties, including Savy, the mother of a teenager in Hasratein, made several filmmakers offer her parts of women that far surpassed her actual age. She admitted that Hasratein had damaged her career in this regard. On one occasion, she had almost played the role of a mother to Amitabh Bachchan, who was twice her age, before she left the project. Although she was initially excited about the acting challenge in playing mature women, she decided to stop accepting such parts, especially after playing the middle-aged part of Bachchan's wife and Akshay Kumar's mother in Waqt (2005), because filmmakers sought to typecast her in similar parts. She explained her choice of Gandhi, My Father (2007) was different as she played Kasturba Gandhi from the character's early adulthood into her later years. Dil Dhadakne Do (2015) was another exception where she was so impressed with the character she could not refuse it.

Shah was one of the leading actresses of Indian television before she left it as she was dissatisfied with the content. Following the positive reaction to her performance in Satya in 1998, she expected more film work coming her way whereas the offers she received at the time comprised mostly small character parts. While initially bothered by the limited work available to her in Hindi films, Shah has over years come to terms with the realisation that satisfactory roles would come to her every once in a while. This resulted in numerous gaps between her film appearances. The rise of digital streaming platforms, however, rejuvenated Shah's career, with parts not otherwise available in films and often written specially for her. Delhi Crime proved to be a major turning point in her career, as it brought an influx of film offers, mostly of leading roles which would seldom come her way before. Consequently, she embarked on the busiest period of her professional life, working on six projects throughout 2020 in films and roles the kind of which she had longed for. She credited digital platforms with giving her opportunity to invest more in her parts: "The web-series format gives me hours to experiment, explore and indulge and understand my character's nuances."

The reception to Shah's performances has been positive from her initial television work. Her early screen persona on television was that of a woman who, according to Chatura Poojari, is "homely, chatty but with a sensible head firmly screwed onto her shoulders—a regular Indian woman who deals with life by wearing a velvet glove over an iron hand". Shah believes her middle-class background has helped her shape a personality which makes her characters relatable. A 1999 article by The Indian Express said that she "pulls off each and every character with absolute ease". Subhash K. Jha describes her as "an impossibly skilled actress" and, on another occasion, "an actress who forces you to watch her". Speaking of her eyes, Devansh Sharma wrote in a review of Once Again (2018), "Her loquacious eyes express rage with as much ease as they do love." Reviewing Jalsa (2022), Monika Rawal Kukreja was highly impressed with Shah's use of just her eyes and expressions to emote. Author and journalist Aparna Pednekar wrote, "Shah's au naturale performances come from an instinctive, savage space, with an abundance of layers simmering beneath a placid smile and soft-spoken personality".

== Sources ==
- Bari, Rachel (2017). "Scripting Cultural Codes: Woman and Cinema". In Gulati, Varun; Dalal, Garima (eds.). Multicultural and Marginalized Voices of Postcolonial Literature. Rowman & Littlefield. pp. 3–10. ISBN 978-1-4985-4745-1. Archived from the original on 22 March 2022.
- Bhattacharjee, Shuhita (8 February 2021). "Shockwaves of Rape and Shattering of Power in the Contemporary Indian Web Series: The Case of Delhi Crime, Made in Heaven, and Judgement Day". In Falcato, Ana; Silva, Sara Graça da (eds.). The Politics of Emotional Shockwaves. Springer Nature. pp. 123–145. ISBN 978-3-030-56021-8.
- Chakravarti, Paromita (2017). "Reading Intertextualities in Rituporno Ghosh's The Last Lear: The Politics of Recanonization". In Chaudhuri, Sukanta (ed.). The Shakespearean International Yearbook: Volume 12: Special Section, Shakespeare in India. Routledge. pp. 115–129. ISBN 978-1-351-96358-9. Archived from the original on 21 March 2022.
- Dasgupta, Sanjukta; Sinha, Dipankar; Chakravarti, Sudeshna (2011). Media, Gender, and Popular Culture in India: Tracking Change and Continuity. SAGE Publishing India. ISBN 978-81-321-1904-3. Archived from the original on 15 March 2022.
- Dasgupta, Rohit K.; Datta, Sangeeta (2018). 100 Essential Indian Films. Rowman & Littlefield. ISBN 978-1-4422-7799-1. Archived from the original on 30 November 2021.
- Dwyer, Rachel (2005). 100 Bollywood films. London: BFI. ISBN 978-1-83871-397-3. Archived from the original on 11 March 2022.
- Gokulsing, K. Moti; Dissanayake, Wimal (2013). Routledge Handbook of Indian Cinemas. Routledge. ISBN 978-1-136-77284-9. Archived from the original on 11 May 2022.
- Mahadevan, Ananth (2020). Once Upon A Prime Time: My Journey on Indian Television. Embassy Books. ISBN 978-93-89995-09-1. Archived from the original on 27 March 2022.
- Mankekar, Purnima (2012). "Dangerous Desires: Erotics, Public Culture, and Identity in Late Twentieth-Century India". In Mankekar, Purnima; Schein, Louisa (eds.). Media, Erotics, and Transnational Asia. Duke University Press. pp. 173–202. ISBN 978-0-8223-4577-0.
- Munjal, Sunil Kant; Rai, S. K. (2017). All the World is a Stage: The Story of How the LSS Invigorated Ludhiana's Art and Culture. Notion Press. ISBN 978-1-945579-97-4. Archived from the original on 21 March 2022.
- Roy, Rajdeep (2011). "Bollywood and the Mumbai Underworld Reading Satya in Retrospect". In Basu, Partha Pratim; Chanda, Ipshita (eds.). Locating Cultural Change: Theory, Method, Process. SAGE Publications India. pp. 98–119. ISBN 978-81-321-0763-7. Archived from the original on 24 April 2022.
- Scheuer, Steven H.; Brill-Scheuer, Alida (2007). Pocket Guide to Collecting Movies on DVD: Building an Essential Movie Collection – With Information on the Best DVD Extras, Supplements and Special Features – and the Best DVDs for Kids. Simon and Schuster. ISBN 978-1-4165-8553-4. Archived from the original on 27 March 2022.
- Singh, Paramveer (2021). Indian Silver Screen. K.K. Publications. ISBN 978-81-7844-229-7. Archived from the original on 10 April 2022.
- Thaker, Dhirubhai; Desai, Kumarpal, eds. (2007). Gujarat: A Panorama of the Heritage of Gujarat. Prakashan: 2. Ahmedabad: Gujarat Vishwakosh Trust. pp. 512–532. ISBN 978-93-83975-22-8.
- Tzanelli, Rodanthi (2015). Mobility, Modernity and the Slum: The Real and Virtual Journeys of 'Slumdog Millionaire'. Routledge. ISBN 978-1-317-43819-9. Archived from the original on 15 March 2022.
