= Precipitate delivery =

Childbirth after unusually rapid labor

Precipitate delivery (also called rapid labor) refers to childbirth after an unusually rapid labor. It is typically defined expulsion of the infant within 3 hours of regular contractions starting, although some providers consider anything less than 5 hours to be precipitous. In contrast, typical labor lasts between 6 and 18 hours on average. It is uncommon, and an understudied topic. In the United States it occurs in 1%-3% of all births.

== Predisposing factors ==
There is no way to predict rapid delivery, and sometimes no predisposing factors are present. However, there are factors which make it more likely, including:

1. Placental abruption.
2. Having prior births.
3. Previous rapid delivery.
4. Young maternal age (teenagers).
5. Preterm delivery.
6. Lower birth weight.
7. Hypertensive disorders.

== Danger of precipitate delivery ==
Some associations commonly found include:

=== Maternal ===
Lacerations of the cervix, vagina, and/or perineum (25x greater odds than in typical labor). Rapid descent and delivery of an infant does not always allow maternal tissues adequate time to stretch and accommodate the passage of the infant. There may be hemorrhaging (35x greater odds than in typical labor) originating from lacerations and/or hematomas of the cervix, vagina, perineum, or uterus. There may be infection as a result of unsterile delivery due to inability to reach a sterile environment in time. Intense pain is more likely than in normal labor, where each contraction gradually opens the cervix and prods the baby out. In precipitous labor, the cervix still has to open just as wide, and the baby still has to move just as far—but in much less time. This can also result in emotional effects, such as feeling disconnected and out of control of one's body. Psychological trauma afterwards is common.

The risk of preterm delivery in future pregnancies is about 7.3% after a precipitate delivery, compared to 2.6% after a normal labor.

=== Neonatal ===
Precipitate delivery may cause aspiration of amniotic fluid, especially if the birth is unattended. As with the mother, there may be infection in the newborn as a result of unsterile delivery.
