= Dariya Chhoru =

1999 Indian film by Vipul Shah

- Directed by: Vipul Amrutlal Shah
- Written by: Prakash Kapadia
- Produced by: Bipin Shah
- Starring: Jamnadas Majethia; Shefali Shah
- Cinematography: Inderjit Bansal
- Music by: Uttanak Vinayak Vora
- Production company: Time Line
- Distributed by: Time Digital
- Release date: 10 November 1999
- Running time: 145 minutes
- Country: India
- Language: Gujarati

Dariya Chhoru is a 1999 Indian Gujarati-language drama film directed by Vipul Amrutlal Shah. The film stars Jamnadas Majethia and Shefali Shah in lead roles. The film won nine awards by the state of Gujarat, including Best Film, Best Director, and acting awards for its leading stars. The film is a love story situated on the coast of Saurashtra in Gujarat between a poor man and young woman from a wealthy family.

== Plot ==
Along the seacoast of Saurashtra in Gujarat, a love story sparks between a poor man and a young woman from a rich family. The two decide to marry against her father's disapproval.

== Production ==
The film is Vipul Shah's directorial debut. The script was also written by a first-timer, Prakash Kapadia. The film is the first Gujarati film to be filmed on 35 mm cinemascope.

== Cast ==
- Jamnadas Majethia as Chhoru
- Shefali Shah as Dariya
- Rupa Divetia as Dariya's mother

== Soundtrack ==
No.	Title	Artist(s)	Length
1.	"Sanam Sanam"	Uttanak Vinayak Vora & Mahalaxmi	3:56
2.	"Haiyya Re Haiyya"	Vinod Rathod & Mahalaxmi	5:15
3.	"Hunto Vadal Ni Jem"	Vinod Rathod & Mahalaxmi	4:25
4.	"Dariyane Ponkhava"	Various artists	4:02
5.	"Aansoomara Khotya"	Jaywant Singh & Mahalaxmi	5:24
6.	"Ekltha Sangathe"	Jaywant Singh & Mahalaxmi	5:57
7.	"Kapyo Che"	Uttanak Vinayak Vora & Mahalaxmi	5:27

== Release and reception ==
The film was a box-office success. According to The Times of India, the film catered to educated Gujarati viewers. According to the book Routledge Handbook of Indian Cinemas, Dariya Chhoru was among the films "started the trend of spending big money on publicity in the Gujarati film industry." According to the director, film actor Amitabh Bachchan praised it as the best regional film he had seen. According to the book Gujarat, the film succeeded in spite of prejudice against Gujarati cinema:

It was left to Vipul Shah, the director of the film Dariya Chhoru, to face the bitter sarcasm made against Gujarati films and to meet the challenge successfully.

The same book wrote that the film "proved that with sincere efforts made for them, good Gujarati films can be produced". The author further writes that the story is "beautifully portrayed" due to the "skillful handling" of the director, and takes note of how "Vipul Shah and J. D. Majithia and Shefali Chhaya as screen artists could create fresh hopes among the film goers in Gujarat".

Film director Sanjay Leela Bhansali had watched the film and was so impressed with the film and the dialogue that he employed writer Kapadia for his 2002 BAFTA Award-nominated film Devdas.

== Awards ==
The film was the major winner with nine wins at the Gujarat State Film Awards, including Best Film, Best Director, Best Actor for Majethia, and Best Actress for Shah.
