= Stardust Award for Best Supporting Actress =

Film award in India

The Stardust Best Supporting Actress Award is chosen the readers of the annual Stardust magazine. The award honours a star that has made an impact with their acting and represents new talent.

Here is a list of the award winners and the films for which they won.

Year	Actress	Film
2003	Simone Singh	Sur – The Melody of Life
2004	Priyanka Chopra	The Hero: Love Story of a Spy
2005	Kirron Kher	Veer-Zaara
2006	Shefali Shah	Waqt
2007	Ayesha Takia	Dor
2008	Tisca Chopra	Taare Zameen Par
2009	Kangana Ranaut	Fashion
2010	Kirron Kher	Kurbaan
2011	Prachi Desai	Once Upon a Time in Mumbaai
2012
2013	Shazahn Padamsee	Housefull 2
2014	Tabu	Haider
2015	Shefali Shah	Dil Dhadakne Do
2016	Shabana Azmi	Neerja
2017	Neha Sharma	Mubarakan

== See also ==
- Stardust Awards
- Bollywood
- Cinema of India
