= Doctor G =

2022 Indian social drama film by Anubhuti Kashyap

- Theatrical release poster
- Directed by: Anubhuti Kashyap
- Written by: Sumit Saxena; Saurabh Bharat; Vishal Wagh; Anubhuti Kashyap
- Story by: Saurabh Bharat; Vishal Wagh
- Produced by: Vineet Jain
- Starring: Ayushmann Khurrana; Rakul Preet Singh; Shefali Shah; Indraneil Sengupta
- Cinematography: Eeshit Narain
- Edited by: Prerna Saigal
- Music by: Score: Ketan Sodha; Songs: Amit Trivedi; Sultan Sulemani; Amjad Nadeem Aamir
- Production company: Junglee Pictures
- Distributed by: Anand Pandit Motion Pictures (India); Viacom18 Studios (International)
- Release date: 14 October 2022
- Running time: 124 minutes
- Country: India
- Language: Hindi

Doctor G is a 2022 Indian Hindi-language medical comedy-drama film directed by Anubhuti Kashyap and produced by Vineet Jain under Junglee Pictures. It stars Ayushmann Khurrana, Rakul Preet Singh and Shefali Shah. The film follows the struggles of a medical student who is interested in orthopaedics but instead becomes a gynaecologist, and chaos ensues.

Doctor G was released theatrically on 14 October 2022 and received positive reviews from critics.

== Plot ==
Dr. Uday Gupta is a medical student who has just passed his MBBS final examination. He lives in Bhopal with his widowed mother Shobha, an aspiring chef who hopes to make it big on social media through her cookery channels, and his best friend, Chaddi, who is preparing for the civil services examination. Uday wants to pursue his post-graduation in orthopedics, inspired by his distant cousin Dr. Ashok Gupta (Indraneil Sengupta). His rank in the competitive entrance test, however, is insufficient for an orthopedics specialization in Bhopal. Unwilling to leave his mother behind, Uday reluctantly opts for the best available option in the city — Gynaecology at the Bhopal Institute of Medical Sciences. Ashok also advises Uday to take this opportunity; Uday can simultaneously continue to study for next year's entrance test. Uday is introduced to Kavya Sharma, a high school student who also aspires to become a doctor and whom Ashok is tutoring.

Uday's initiation into Gynaecology starts on a bad note—he is instantly ticked off by the head of the department, the strict Dr. Nandini Shrivastava, for joining the course 10 days late, and he gets bullied by his colleagues, all of whom are female. Uday blames his ex-girlfriend Richa for his present state and, egged on by Ashok, drunkenly calls her and vents his frustrations. His lack of interest at work and his mistakes irritate Nandini, who asks Uday why he doesn't want to become a gynaecologist. Uday replies that male gynaecologists tend not to do well because patients prefer a female doctor examining them. Nandini rubbishes this and asks him to lose his "male touch". Following this, Uday gradually befriends his colleagues, especially his senior, Dr. Fatima Siddiqui. Eventually, he falls for her and the two share a passionate kiss, although Fatima dismisses the act as nothing serious, reminding a disappointed Uday that while he is a good friend, she is set to marry the man she loves, Aarif. She also invites him to their engagement.

On a day the hospital is understaffed, Uday tries to examine a female patient without a female attendant, an act considered unethical. A fight breaks out and the patient and her husband later formally complain against him. While facing a disciplinary enquiry, Uday performs his first delivery in the hospital, a case of precipitate labour. The grateful family, who had lost two pregnancies before, name the baby after him. Uday finally understands his duty as a doctor towards his patients. At the enquiry, testimonies of Uday's colleagues clear his name. Nandini, though, remains unimpressed.

Uday tries to confess his love to Fatima at a dinner date, but Shobha's entry complicates things and Fatima storms off. Meanwhile, Ashok has got Kavya pregnant and needs to get an abortion. A prominent doctor and married with two children, Ashok cannot go with Kavya to a hospital himself, so he asks Uday to take her. Check-ups reveal that Kavya has placenta praevia, making abortion difficult. Nandini refuses when Uday requests her to perform the operation herself, stating that it might threaten Kavya's life and thus her family should be informed first. Ashok asks Uday to keep Kavya at his home for the time being, and the two bond well. Kavya tells him that she had first doubted Ashok's character the day he had encouraged Uday to call and rant against Richa; Uday feels ashamed of his past behavior.

On the day of the engagement, Ashok calls Uday and tells him to take Kavya to his clinic, because he has "come up with a solution". Arriving home, Uday is shocked to find Shobha partying with an elderly stranger, who turns out to be her Tinder date. Infuriated, Uday orders both the old man and Chaddi—who had helped Shobha get on Tinder in the first place—out of the house. When Uday claims that he has made sacrifices for her sake, Shobha snaps back, relating the difficulties she had raising him as a single mother. Now that her son has grown up, she now desires companionship. Mother and son then make peace.

Soon, Uday receives a call from Kavya — she is in intense pain after receiving an injection at a private clinic. He and Shobha rescue her and rush her to the hospital, where Nandini performs an emergency operation and saves her life. Ashok arrives at the hospital and confronts Uday, but he hits back. Since Kavya is a minor and below the age of consent, the matter is turned over to the police, who arrest Ashok for statutory rape. Uday again has to face an enquiry, and possible rustication, for lying to Nandini about Kavya's age earlier. Nandini, however, sees that Uday is now a changed man, and decides against punishing him. An overjoyed Uday rushes to Fatima's engagement, and proposes to remain her true friend forever.

== Cast ==
- Ayushmann Khurrana as Dr. Uday "Guddu" Gupta a first year male OBGY student
- Rakul Preet Singh as Dr. Fatima Siddiqui, an OBGY resident and Uday's senior
- Shefali Shah as Dr. Nandini Shrivastava, Head of the Obstetrics and Gynaecology Department
- Sheeba Chaddha as Shobha Gupta, Uday's mother
- Indraneil Sengupta as Dr. Ashok Gupta, Uday's cousin
- Jhumma Mitra as Dr. Mhadvai Gynaecologist
- Abhay Chintamani Mishr as Abhishek Chandel "Chaddi", Uday's best friend
- Ayesha Kaduskar as Kavya Sharma
- Akash Sinha as Jagdish Sahay
- Devas Dixit as Pappu Sahu
- Paresh Pahuja as Aarif Qureshi, Fatima's fiancé
- Priyam Saha as Dr. Jenny Jacob
- Shraddha Jain as Dr. Kumudlatha Pamulparthi Diwakaran aka KLPD
- Puja Sarup as Nurse Sunita
- Karishma Singh as Dr. Ruchi
- Anju Gaur as Dr. Bosky
- Sharvari Deshpande as Priyanka Singh
- Raj Sharma as Vinod Kumar Jaiswal
- Sanjana Vij as Richa, Uday's ex-girlfriend
- Shyam Bhimsaria as Counselor in College

== Production ==
=== Development ===
The film was announced in December 2020 with Ayushmann Khurrana in the lead role, being the first directorial film of Anubhuti Kashyap. In February 2021, Rakul Preet Singh was signed to star opposite Khurrana.

=== Filming ===
Principal photography commenced in July 2021. It was primarily shot in Bhopal. The film was wrapped up in September 2021. Some of the scenes were filmed in the University of Allahabad.

== Soundtrack ==
Doctor G

Soundtrack album by Amit Trivedi, Sultan Sulemani and Amjad Nadeem Aamir
- Released: 30 September 2022
- Recorded: 2021–2022
- Genre: Feature film soundtrack
- Length: 26:56
- Language: Hindi
- Label: Zee Music Company
External audio
- Doctor G - Full Album on YouTube

The music of the film is composed by Amit Trivedi, Amjad Nadeem Aamir and Sultan Sulemani. The background score is composed by Ketan Sodha.

Tracklist
No.	Title	Lyrics	Music	Singer(s)	Length
1.	"Har Jagah Tu"	Kumaar	Sultan Sulemani	Raj Barman	2:49
2.	"Dil Dhak Dhak Dhak Karta Hai"	Amjad Nadeem	Amjad Nadeem Aamir	Raj Barman, Sakshi Holkar	3:12
3.	"O Sweetie Sweetie"	Raj Shekhar	Amit Trivedi	Ayushmann Khurrana	3:25
4.	"Idiot Aashawadi"	Puneet Sharma	Amit Trivedi	Anand Bhaskar, Romy	3:26
5.	"Newton"	Puneet Sharma	Amit Trivedi	Altamash Faridi	3:55
6.	"Step Copy"	Puneet Sharma	Amit Trivedi	Amit Trivedi, Sharvi Yadav	3:22
7.	"Ek Boond"	Puneet Sharma	Amit Trivedi	Madhubanti Bagchi, Abhay Jodhpurkar	3:15
8.	"Har Jagah Tu" (Female version)	Kumaar	Sultan Sulemani	Palak Muchhal	3:32
Total length:					26:56

== Release ==
Doctor G was initially scheduled to be released on 17 June 2022. It was finally released on 14 October 2022. The film began to stream on Netflix from 11 December 2022. Anand Pandit Motion Pictures and PVR Pictures acquired All India distribution rights while Viacom18 Studios acquired overseas distribution rights and Star Shining Films acquired Chinese distribution rights.

== Reception ==
=== Critical response ===
Doctor G received generally positive reviews from critics with praise for the performances and the right mix of humour and emotions with an underlying social message. On the review aggregator website Rotten Tomatoes, 70% of 10 critics' reviews are positive, with an average rating of 6.6/10.

The Times of India rated the film 4 out of 5 stars and wrote, "Anubhuti Kashyap shows her potential to direct a story in a manner that can thoroughly engross the audience, while also taking it in a direction that makes it a conversation-starter for the right reasons. Every character in Doctor G, performs their part finely to pump life into the story." Devesh Sharma of Filmfare rated the film 4 out of 5 stars and wrote, "Doctor G is a conversation starter of sorts for several issues plaguing our society. Watch this well-made film for its positive message and for the inspired acting displayed by the entire cast." Eshita Bhargava of The Financial Express rated the film 4 out of 5 stars and wrote, "Doctor G is a subtle slap to the patriarchy for teaching us things that are not meant to be." Sanchita Jhunjhunwala of Times Now rated the film 4 out of 5 stars and wrote, "The second half of Doctor G is a plus for the movie, but it does get a slow start. If this genre as a whole is something that you enjoy watching, you would definitely have fun watching this one as well."

Saibal Chatterjee of NDTV rated the film 3.5 out of 5 stars and wrote, "Doctor G is an entertaining comedy that handles the serious business of getting a clutch of important points across without losing its balance. Portions that possess depth and veracity propel the film forward." Titas Chowdhury of News 18 rated the film 3.5 out of 5 stars and wrote, "Doctor G manages to offer a kind of novelty and brings us back the Ayushmann Khurrana we have been yearning for." Sukanya Verma of Rediff rated the film 3.5 out of 5 stars and stated that the film blends "mirth and meaning." Tina Das of The Print rated the film 3.5 out of 5 stars and wrote, "Doctor G is heavier than the usual Ayushmann Khurrana films. The laughs are fewer and the reality checks are heavier. But it is also about a movie that does not crack jokes at the expense of women and teaches without making the man a hero or the film a preach fest." Kartik Bhardwaj of The New Indian Express rated the film 3.5 out of 5 stars and wrote, "The winner, though, is Ayushmann again. He is tremendously enjoyable as the vexed doctor unable to understand what he is doing wrong."

Amandeep Narang of ABP News rated the film 3 out of 5 stars and wrote, "Doctor G deserves a mention especially with the way it deals with adult friendships between men and women. This is done quite maturely between Rakul Preet Singh and Ayushmann's character." Mayank Shekar of Mid Day rated the film 3 out of 5 stars and wrote, "Doctor G is director Anubhuti Kashyap*s debut feature. Which evidently comes with its own occupational hazard of saying as much as you can, at one go." Anna M.M. Vetticad of Firstpost rated the film 2.5 out of 5 stars and wrote, "The film has remarkable clarity in some areas, but is fuzzy and inconsistent elsewhere, ridiculously so in the end." Pratikshya Mishra of The Quint rated the film 2.5 out of 5 stars and wrote, "Doctor G's entire messaging though, is pretty surface level and the makers trying to tie multiple threads into the screenplay without assigning enough time leaves the audience unravelling yarn." Bollywood Hungama rated the film 2.5 out of 5 stars and wrote, "Doctor G works due to the message, performances, and impactful second half."

Shubhra Gupta of The Indian Express rates the film 2.5.out of 5 stars and wrote, "Ayushmann Khurrana film is so busy earning its feminist cred that it forgets the show-more-than-tell dictum, and never becomes the cracker it could have been." Rohit Bhatnagar of The Free Press Journal rated the film 2.5 out of 5 stars and wrote, "Doctor G might be your rescue from a boring weekend, but it’s all show, no glory." Grace Cyril of India Today rated the film 2 out of 5 stars and wrote, "Ayushmann needs to step up his game and look for better roles. You can watch Doctor G just for its comedy." Writing for The Hindu, Anuj Kumar stated, "Tailor-made for Ayushmann Khurrana, the Anubhuti Kashyap dramedy addresses the issue of gender stereotyping with a light touch." Abhimanyu Mathur of The Hindustan Times stated, "The Ayushmann Khurrana, Rakul Preet Singh-starrer is formulaic and cringey but also heartwarming and sensitive, making it a confusing but watchable mess." Nandini Ramnath of Scroll.in stated, "Doctor G is the kind of film in which the question answers itself."
