= Waqt: The Race Against Time =

2005 Indian film by Vipul Shah

- Theatrical release poster
- Directed by: Vipul Amrutlal Shah
- Screenplay by: Aatish Kapadia
- Story by: Aatish Kapadia
- Based on: Awajo Vahala Phari Malishu by Aatish Kapadia
- Produced by: Vipul Amrutlal Shah
- Starring: Amitabh Bachchan; Akshay Kumar; Priyanka Chopra; Shefali Shah; Rajpal Yadav; Boman Irani
- Cinematography: Santosh Thundiyil; Ashok Mehta; (Guest cinematographer)
- Edited by: Shirish Kunder
- Music by: Anu Malik
- Production companies: Blockbuster Movie Entertainers; Entertainment One; Eros International
- Distributed by: Eros International
- Release date: 22 April 2005
- Running time: 150 minutes
- Country: India
- Language: Hindi
- Budget: ₹16 crore
- Box office: ₹42.48 crore

Waqt: The Race Against Time or simply known as Waqt (Hindi pronunciation: [ʋəqt]; transl. Time) is a 2005 Indian Hindi-language drama film directed and produced by Vipul Amrutlal Shah. Based on a Gujarati play by Aatish Kapadia, the film stars an ensemble cast of Amitabh Bachchan, Akshay Kumar, Priyanka Chopra, Shefali Shetty Shah, Rajpal Yadav and Boman Irani. It follows the journey of Ishwar Chandra Thakur (Bachchan), an old rich businessman who unexpectedly turns very strict to his spoiled son Aditya Thakur (Kumar) to teach him life lessons before it is too late.

Shah wanted to make a film about a grounded father-son relationship differing from standard Bollywood father-son stories. Impressed after watching Kapadia's play, Shah bought the rights for a film adaptation. Principal photography was done on 14 sets at Filmistan Studio in Mumbai and a song was filmed in Leh, Ladakh. The music was composed by Anu Malik and the lyrics were written by Sameer, with the exception of one song written by Kapadia.

Budgeted at ₹110 million, Waqt was released theatrically on 22 April 2005. It became a box office success, grossing over ₹424.8 million, thus ranking as the 7th highest-grossing Bollywood film of 2005. Waqt was nominated at Filmfare Awards for Best Supporting Actress (Shefali Shah) and Best Comedian (Yadav). In addition, Shefali Shah won the Stardust Award for Best Supporting Actress for her performance.

== Plot ==
Ishwarchand Thakur and Sumitra Thakur are a married couple who run a toy factory together. They have a son named Aditya Thakur, who is spoiled and has no interest in responsibility or his direction in life except wanting to become a film actor. Sumitra scolds Ishwar for always spoiling Aditya and pampering him too much. After refusing to show up for a marriage proposal, The situation deteriorates when Aditya elopes and secretly marries his girlfriend Pooja, the daughter of Ishwar's rival Nattu without telling his parents.

When Pooja becomes pregnant, Ishwar and Sumitra decide to force Aditya to understand his responsibilities in caring for his wife and child. They throw Aditya and Pooja out of their house, and the couple moves into a small house in the garden of the house. Ishwar makes it very difficult for Aditya to live on his own by removing the fuse for the fan and not allowing him to take food from home. Ishwar loathes that Aditya is a selfish person and fears his soon-to-be-born child would be an orphan with someone like him as his father. Aditya then starts to change and works hard to become a responsible father and husband by taking a job as a risky stuntman for films. However, Aditya also begins to hate his father; they do not speak to each other for a long time, during which Aditya becomes aware of his role as a father.

Ishwar, who wants to ensure his son is secure and responsible, is suffering from final stage lung cancer. He fears telling Aditya the truth about it, as he knows it will devastate him the most; therefore, he hides it and covers it up every time by being strict and harsh towards him. Aditya becomes a responsible man and finds out about his father's illness when he attends Aditya's performance on stage. Aditya steps onto the stage and asks the audience to pray for his father to stay alive until his son's birth. Ishwar survives until the birth; the child is a boy, whom Ishwar names after himself, and he dies. Aditya welcomes children into his father's toy factory and, in the presence of his family, including his toddler Ishwar, plays with a lonely, disabled boy. The spirit of Ishwar touches the flowers in Sumitra's hair, reminding her of earlier times.

== Cast ==
The cast is listed below:

- Amitabh Bachchan as Ishwar Chandra Thakur, Aditya's father
- Akshay Kumar as Aditya "Adi" Thakur, Ishwar's son
- Priyanka Chopra as Pooja Singh Thakur, Aditya's wife and Ishwar's daughter-in-law
- Shefali Shetty Shah as Sumitra Thakur, Ishwar's wife and Aditya's mother
- Boman Irani as Natham "Nattu" Singh, Pooja's father
- Rajpal Yadav as Laxman Singh,Ishwar's Servant
- Asawari Joshi as Ashalata Singh, Pooja's mother
- Rajeev Mehta as Jolly
- Hemant Pandey
- Benjamin Gilani as a Director
- Anu Malik (cameo) as a DJ in the song, "Miraksam"

== Production ==
=== Development and casting ===
Director Vipul Amrutlal Shah wanted to make a film about a father-son relationship that would be different from "standard Bollywood father-son" stories. Shah wanted to explore nuances of the relationship and touch upon themes about a father-son relationship that is grounded in reality, which had not yet been depicted in Bollywood. After watching Aatish Kapadia's Gujarati play Awajo Vahala Phari Malishu, Shah liked it and bought its film adaptation rights. Kapadia, who had co-written Shah's 2002 heist thriller Aankhen with him, adapted his play for the screen.

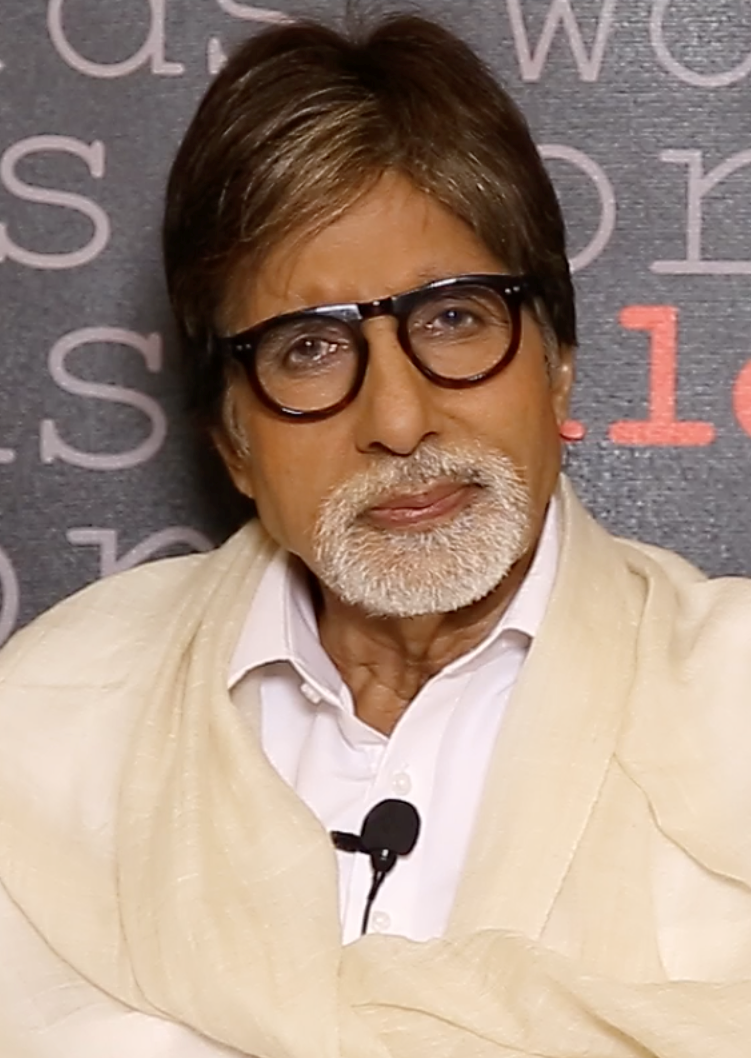
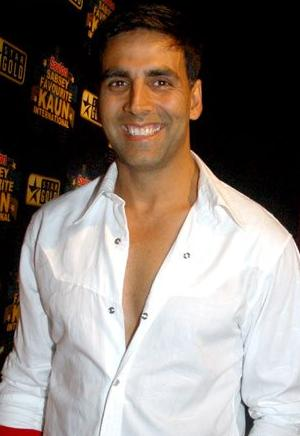
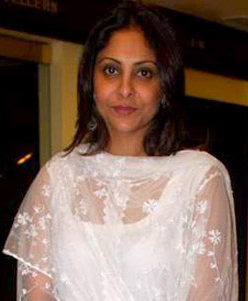
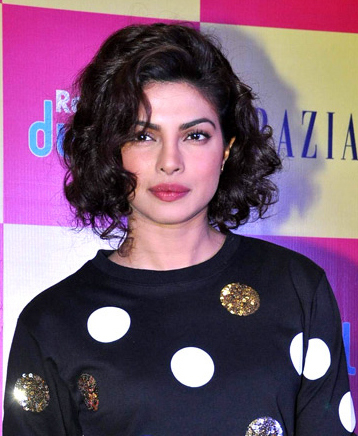
Principal cast (clockwise): Amitabh Bachchan, Akshay Kumar, Priyanka Chopra and Shefali Shah

Shah said of the film's theme; "It is an unusual story of a father and a son. It is very, very real and believable. I can assure you that any father-son duo of any economic strata will be able to identify with the father and son in my film." Shah also said the film is "straight from the heart", and that it "is about the upbringing that a father gives to a kid. And that is the biggest job and challenge in a father's life. So it automatically leads to a lot of emotional conflict within the family."

Shah said he felt the film's title suits its theme perfectly, saying "Waqt is called The Race Against Time because there is a target that both father and son have set out to achieve, and for that they've got limited time. So there really is a race against the clock. If they don't achieve their targets in that time, life will take a very disastrous turn. They each have their own target." The film was produced by Shah under his production company Blockbuster Movie Entertainers and was presented by Manmohan Shetty's company Entertainment One and Kishore Lulla and Sunil Lulla's company Eros International. It was the first major co-production for Eros International.

Shah cast the film's six main characters. In late May 2003, he said he had cast Amitabh Bachchan and Akshay Kumar, both of whom starred in his previous film Aankhen, as the father and son characters and that he hoped to cast his wife Shefali Shah as one of the film's two female leads. Shah cast Priyanka Chopra in role of Kumar's wife after seeing her performance in her debut film The Hero: Love Story of a Spy (2003). It is the fourth and final film to date to star the successful pairing of Kumar and Chopra, who appeared together in Andaaz (2003), Mujhse Shaadi Karogi (2004) and Aitraaz (2004).

Rajpal Yadav and Boman Irani completed the cast. Shah had planned to cast Bachchan along with his real-life son Abhishek Bachchan but their busy schedules meant they could not commit to the film together. Shah had approached Bachchan with two different scripts and asked him to choose which one he wanted to do with his son. Bachchan chose the script of Waqt: The Race Against Time, but Shah had to wait one year for them to be available together. Shah abandoned the idea and instead cast Kumar for the role. Shah had also approached Paresh Rawal for a role in the film. Shefali Shah, who is younger than Kumar, was cast to play Kumar's character's mother and as the wife of the much-older Bachchan. The director wanted to cast a female actor who had not been paired opposite Bachchan before and while discussing potential contenders for the role, Bachchan suggested Shefali, who he thought would be perfect for the role. Shah was apprehensive to cast his wife, saying, "I thought people would say I was trying to promote my wife. So I didn't mention her name as a possible co-star to Amitji", but Bachchan asked Shah to at least audition her or have her photographed for the role before making a decision. The director did a photography session with Bachchan, Kumar and his wife, and he later said they looked like a family and after fifteen days, Shefali Shah was officially cast in the film.

=== Characters ===
Bachchan watched Awajo Vahala Phari Malishu, the play on which the film is based, and was attracted to the setting and situations, and the character's relationships and behavior. He said, "I was attracted to just these facts—how these relationships have been built up; and how the interactions, the situations, are brought up; what the characters do, how they behave; the events that take place; and the eventual solution". Bachchan thought the "interesting screenplay" was "really funny" and "quite emotional", and the film's treatment makes it different from other films. Bachchan described his character as a lenient father who has spoilt his son to a great extent but later turns into a "strict father" to teach his son the valuable life lessons, which creates conflict in their lives. According to Bachchan, his character "doesn't really want to be rude to the son but he has to be, because he feels that unless he's rude the son is not going to learn anything. So his behaviour is made to be harsh and rude, and that's how it transpires."

Kumar was drawn to the film because of its story; he said; "When Vipul narrated this story to me, I was very touched by it. In many ways, it is a lot like my own life." Kumar said it was his "most personal film" and that he worked "very honestly" on it. According to Kumar, at one point he was in talks to produce the film with Shah but it could not work out. Chopra said the film has a quality to make people laugh and cry, and described her role as one of a "spoilt brat" and a "supporting wife" who stands by her husband in difficult times, saying "Because she is brought up with every possible luxury that she would want and then suddenly she reaches a point where she has to deal with life and see how difficult it can be".

Shefali said the film's strengths are its "simplicity and honesty", and that she found playing a fifty-year-old woman whose life revolves around her child and husband to be challenging. She felt her character is strong and different from the mothers usually portrayed in Bollywood films, saying:

She is someone who has come up the hard way in life and understands the importance of whatever her husband has achieved. She wants her son to understand that and stand on his own feet and achieve what her husband has been able to achieve. Her ability to laugh at situations and her sense of humour when her world is falling apart is her strength.

Yadav found his character of a dimwit to be a "good role", saying, "he reacts very slowly. Although he tries hard but his level of intelligence is only that much." Irani called his character a "loud, brazen, shameless, egotistical" man who "keeps reminding [Bachchan's character] that his son is a useless character because he himself has a wonderful daughter"; he found the character easy to portray, saying he "is a reasonably an easy connect because we do have so many people like that around". Vikram Phadnis designed the costumes for the actors.

=== Filming ===
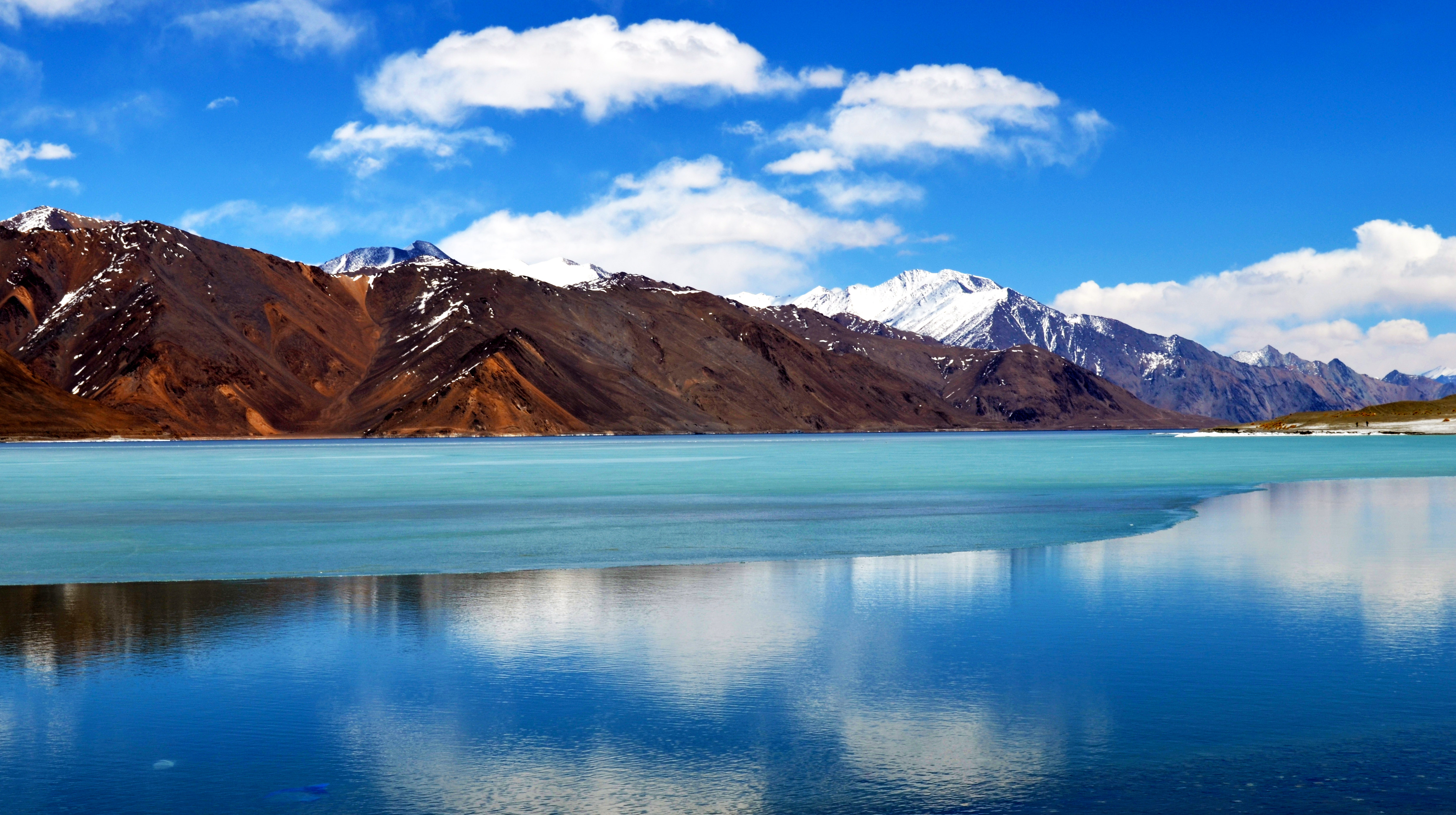
The song "Subah Hogi" was shot entirely in Leh, Ladakh, India including at Pangong Lake

Waqt: The Race Against Time was launched on 24 November 2003 at an event held on Juhu Beach, Mumbai. The Muhurat shot was staged at this event, which started with an audio-visual presentation hosted by Chopra and followed by Bachchan, Kumar and Chopra enacting a live performance on the stage. Shah said he was holding an event on a stage on a public beach, which anyone allowed to attend, because he wanted "the common man to witness and be a part of the mahurat of a Hindi film". Media reported the crew planned to start filming in January or February 2004.

Principal photography took place at Filmistan Studio in Mumbai. The production designer was Omung Kumar. Fourteen sets were constructed for the film. Santosh Thundiyil and Ashok Mehta handled the cinematography. Mehta, who only filmed at "the location of the Ishar [Bachchan's character] House", was credited as a "guest cinematographer" in the film. Several scenes were shot out of chronological order; the scenes based in one particular set were filmed together to save time. An action scene featuring Kumar being chased by twenty Alsatian dogs was filmed. Initially this scene was supposed to have five dogs but Kumar felt it looked weak and asked for more dogs in the scene to give it more tension.

The songs were choreographed by Remo D'Souza. The song "Subah Hogi" was filmed at Pangong Lake and Nimmu, the confluence of the Indus and Zanskar rivers, in Leh, Ladakh. Bachchan, who has featured in a number of Holi songs in his film career, does not appear in the film's Holi number "Do Me A Favour, Let's Play Holi". Shah tried putting Bachchan in the song but decided it did not fit in the script, calling it a "tough decision". Chopra had an accident while filming the Holi song; The set was wet and so was Chopra while filming the Holi dance sequences. After the choreographer called for break, Chopra went to dry off in the trailer and she was electrocuted as she turned the door knob. Her hand stuck to the knob but her hairdresser knocked her away from it. After the incident, Chopra was unconscious and was rushed to the nearby Lilavati hospital. After two hours, she returned to the studio to complete filming the same night. In early December 2004, Shah said he was looking for another 20 days of filming before wrapping the film, followed by three to four months of post-production and an April 2005 release. The film was edited by Shirish Kunder.

== Soundtrack ==
Waqt: The Race Against Time

Soundtrack album by Anu Malik
- Released: 22 February 2005
- Genre: Feature film soundtrack
- Length: 38:05
- Language: Hindi
- Label: T-Series

The soundtrack of Waqt: The Race Against Time was composed by Anu Malik and the lyrics were written by Sameer, with an exception of one song, which was written by Aatish Kapadia. The album consists of six original songs and an original instrumental. The song's vocals were sung by Udit Narayan, Alka Yagnik, Adnan Sami, Sonu Nigam, Sudesh Bhosle, Mahalakshmi Iyer, Sunidhi Chauhan, Malik and Kailash Kher. The soundtrack was released in February 2005 on the record label T-Series.

Shah said the production team had decided to include an unusual Holi song titled "Do Me A Favour, Let's Play Holi" with a contemporary sound, starting as a traditional folk song and ending with hip-hop. Shah said, "So in a way it shows the journey from where holi has started and where it has reached today. And to bring in a different feel we decided to start it with an English line. Post the release of the album, the song became widely popular and it remains one of the most popular Bollywood Holi songs.

Bollywood Hungama said the album is "satisfying", writing "The opening tracks of Waqt are good, but subsequent songs, starting from "Chhup Ja" get you all excited about the music. The Holi number and the club track are the pick of the lot, while "Miraksam" would also stay on for a few weeks at least." The review praised "Chhup Ja", calling it a "beautifully composed subtle love song", with great orchestra throughout and excellent singing by Nigam and Chauhan, and praising its "sweetly paced" lyrics by Sameer, which he thought stood out. The reviewer also noted "Do Me A Favour, Let's Play Holi" to be different from "a routine Holi number", calling it an "enjoyable affair" but said the "rap'n'reggae" parts in "Miraksam" made it sound familiar. S. Sahaya Ranjit writing for India Today noted the album "showcases a new, improved Anu Malik" with "good melodies" that were "very carefully crafted". Ranjit also wrote, "'Miraksam 'is already a hit - a typical shaadi ka gana with lots of verve and wit. In "Toot Gaya", another facet of Kailash Kher's voice comes to the fore-very soulful."

Track listing
No.	Title	Lyrics	Singer(s)	Length
1.	"Subah Hogi"	Sameer	Udit Narayan, Alka Yagnik	5:44
2.	"Apne Jahanke"	Aatish Kapadia	Adnan Sami, Sonu Nigam	6:05
3.	"Miraksam"	Sameer	Sudesh Bhosle, Sonu Nigam, Mahalakshmi Iyer, Sunidhi Chauhan	5:35
4.	"Do Me A Favor Let's Play Holi"	Sameer	Anu Malik, Sunidhi Chauhan	6:29
5.	"Toot Gaya"	Sameer	Kailash Kher	7:12
6.	"Tandav Music"		Instrumental	2:24
7.	"Chhup Ja Chuup Ja"	Sameer	Sonu Nigam, Sunidhi Chauhan	5:56

== Marketing and release ==
Marketing of Waqt: The Race Against Time started in November 2004 with the film's launch at Mumbai's Juhu Beach, which was held to attract public attention to the film. Shah said, "I strongly believe that Waqt ... has a universal appeal and a father-son bonding that is highly identifiable. So I wanted the common man to be aware of it." In late December 2004, the film's producers launched a line of greeting cards titled the "Waqt Collection" in collaboration with Archies. This strategy was intended to showcase the "quiet bond of fathers and sons"; the cards had sections titled "Dear Father" and "Dear Son", and the sections included Bachchan's autograph and Kumar's personalised message, respectively. The two teasers of the film—one trailer and one song promo—were released on 30 January 2005. This was the first time that two teasers for a single Bollywood film had been released on the same day. Taran Adarsh noted the trailers created a "stir" and that it was "creating a lot of buzz in the industry circles". In March 2005, the producers released a brochure that was written by Bachchan, who wrote a story describing the relationship between his character with his son.

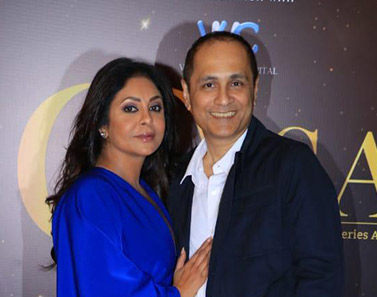
Vipul Amrutlal Shah (pictured with his wife Shefali) wanted the film to reach a wider audience and hence the marketing was planned accordingly

To promote the film, a contest titled "Waqt: Dad & I with Akshay" was held with collaboration with the Fame Cinemas chain, offering a bicycle ride with Kumar, movie tickets, merchandise, clothing, autographed music CDs and brochures of the film as prizes. In a collaboration with greeting-card retailer Archies, the film's producers launched a toy called Geri Giraffe, greeting cards, soft toys, stationery and posters that were sold through Archies outlets. Bachchan promoted the film internationally by participating in press interviews in New York. Kumar had bought the rights of the film to pay tribute to his father, and included a photograph of his father before the opening credits of the film, saying the film felt "autobiographical" to him because he shared a similar relationship with his own father. Kumar said:

I'm dedicating this film to my father. I've bought the distribution rights, so that I can see my father's photograph there. It's personally a very close film to me. I've worked very honestly in this film. I haven't bought the rights to the film in order to make money, but to pay a respectful tribute to my father.

Waqt: The Race Against Time was premiered at the Mumbai IMAX theatre on 21 April 2005; the event was attended by the whole cast and crew. The film was distributed by Eros International and was made on a production and marketing budget of ₹160 million, and was released on 22 April 2005 on 400 screens. The film had a good opening at the box office. It collected over ₹19 million on its opening day and ₹57.8 million in its opening weekend at the domestic box office, and collected over ₹133.5 million on its international opening weekend. The film also had a "solid" opening in the overseas markets such as the United Kingdom and North America. In its first week, the film collected ₹93.7 million at the domestic box office and over ₹200 million worldwide. During its box-office run, the film grossed ₹292 million in India and over ₹132.5 million overseas for a total worldwide gross of over ₹424.8 million. The film was a box-office success, becoming the seventh highest-grossing Bollywood film of the year. Waqt: The Race Against Time was an even-bigger success in the overseas market, particularly in the United Kingdom, where it was the highest-grossing Bollywood film of 2005.

Waqt: The Race Against Time was released on DVD on 6 June 2005 across all regions on an NTSC-format disc that was issued by Eros Entertainment. The DVD includes bonus features such as the making of the film, press meet and interviews, and the film's premiere. The video CD version was released at the same time. The film had its television premiere on the Indian subscriber channel Sony Max on 8 January 2006.

== Reception ==
Taran Adarsh of Bollywood Hungama gave Waqt: The Race Against Time 3.5 out of 5, calling it a "must-see for every parent and every child" and writing, "Waqt: The Race Against Time is a well-made family entertainer that makes you laugh and cry, thanks to the strong emotional quotient in the film. Here's a film that should strike a chord with every family." Adarsh also praised the "first-rate" cinematography that makes the film look "visually rich" and the "opulent" production design. Praising the performances, he wrote:

Bachchan proves yet again that he's invincible when it comes to dramatics. The energy and vigor with which he performs every scene and dance make you look at him in complete awe. Kumar ... handles his part with complete understanding of the character and scores in the emotional moments, mainly in the post-interval portions. Shefali Shah ... conveys the pathos convincingly. Also, she matches the Big B at every step. Chopra doesn't get meaty scenes in the enterprise, but she does leave an impact nonetheless. Boman Irani excels and together with Rajpal Yadav brings the house down. Yadav specially is outstanding.

Writing for India Today, Anupama Chopra called the film "unashamedly cheesy and surprisingly moving" and "a good time pass", concluding "Vipul Amrutlal Shah and his writer Aatish Kapadia are not afraid of bringing out the violins and yanking at heart-strings. So the film has genuinely touching scenes and some easy laughs provided by Boman Irani and Rajpal Yadav." Ziya Us Salam of The Hindu described the movie as a "real, rollicking comedy with just a bit of emotion thrown in, with some of the most natural comic sequences that one has seen in recent times." She was positive of the performances of Bachchan, Irani, and Shah, but opined that the depiction of the father-son relationship is "when the film sinks to melodrama, hyperbole reigns as the director struggles to keep his grip on the script." Variety called the film a "belt-and-braces Bollywood family drama" and wrote "pitched squarely at Indian [audiences], both at home and overseas, who like their entertainment traditional. For Western viewers, [this film] just gets by on its unabashed charm and minor wrinkles to the formula."

Indo-Asian News Service critic Subhash K. Jha praised Kapadia's writing and said his "one-liners and quips flow out with constant and instant comic consequences". Jha also wrote the film's "inherent transparency of purpose and sincerity of expression guide the lengthy family saga through a series of carefully nurtured slopes and dips that culminate in a rabble-rousing emotionally cataclysmic climax". Jha said the film did not require so many songs and praised the performances, noting Bachchan's "leonine strides" across the film that create an "atmosphere conducive to pleasurable acting for the entire cast"; Kumar's performance "beyond anything he has done so far"; Shah's expressive eyes that convey "spousal and matriarchal pain that you come home with"; Chopra for creating and leaving "a sinewy impression" despite not being pivotal to the plot; the outstanding characterisation of Yadav and his "deadpan depiction of the exasperatingly daft" domestic servant; and Irani's "ever-bubbling brilliancy" and sarcasm that "brings miles of smiles and acres of chuckles". Rediff.com praised the film's humour but said the film has an excessive number of songs, calling some of them an "unnecessary burden" and wrote, "Waqt might manage to warm the cockles, it simply doesn't turn up the heat. It leaves you wanting more. Watch Waqt if you are a serious AB-Akki fan or have the time to kill."

== Accolades ==
Award	Date (Note: Linked to the article about the awards held that year, wherever possible.)	Category	Recipient(s) and nominee(s)	Result	Ref.
Filmfare Awards	25 February 2006	Best Supporting Actress	Shefali Shah	Nominated	
Filmfare Awards	25 February 2006	Best Performance in a Comic Role	Rajpal Yadav	Nominated	
International Indian Film Academy Awards	17 June 2006	Best Performance in a Comic Role	Boman Irani	Nominated	
Producers Guild Film Awards	21 January 2006	Best Actor in a Leading Role	Akshay Kumar	Nominated	
Screen Awards	11 January 2006	Best Supporting Actress	Shefali Shah	Nominated	
Stardust Awards	2006	Best Supporting Actress	Shefali Shah	Won	
Stardust Awards	2006	Superstar of Tomorrow – Female	Priyanka Chopra	Nominated	
Zee Cine Awards	4 March 2006	Best Actor – Male	Akshay Kumar	Nominated	
