= Once Again (2018 film) =

- Directed by: Kanwal Sethi
- Written by: Kanwal Sethi
- Produced by: Holm Taddiken; Ajay Rai; Sanjay Gulati; Alan McAlex; Arno Krimmer; Leis Bagdach
- Starring: Shefali Shah; Neeraj Kabi; Rasika Dugal; Bidita Bag; Priyanshu Painyuli
- Cinematography: Eeshit Narain
- Edited by: Søren B. Ebbe; Anja Siemens; Andreas Wodraschke
- Music by: Talvin Singh; Additional Music : Georg Siebert
- Production companies: Neufilm; JAR Pictures; Crawling Angel Films; Ascending Films
- Distributed by: Netflix
- Release date: 1 September 2018
- Running time: 101 minutes
- Countries: India; Germany; Austria
- Language: Hindi

Once Again is a 2018 Indian romantic drama film written and directed by Kanwal Sethi. Starring Shefali Shah and Neeraj Kabi, the film follows two middle-aged people, one a famous actor, another a restaurateur, falling in love with each other. Rasika Dugal, Bidita Bag and Priyanshu Painyuli appear in supporting roles.

The film was originally written in German since Sethi is Indian-German; Later it was translated in English and Hindi. It won the best project award in Work-in-Progress Lab at the Film Bazaar in Goa and later also other awards. Shah also sang a song for the film. Once Again was released on Netflix on 1 September 2018 and also had a limited theatrical release in metro cities on 8 December. It has been also released in Germany by Arsenalfilm and France with great reviews from the critics.

== Plot ==
Amar is an ageing film star. A famous and wealthy man, he lives alone in Mumbai, a city of 15 million souls, the city of dreams. Tara, a widow, runs a small restaurant with the help of her son, who delivers Amar's meals. Tara has never seen Amar - except on the big screen. What began by pure chance a year ago has now turned into a ritual: for hours on end they talk to each other on the phone. Until one day, when Amar sets out to meet Tara in the flesh.

== Cast ==
- Shefali Shah as Tara Shetty
- Neeraj Kabi as Amar Kumar
- Rasika Dugal as Sapna, Amar's daughter
- Bidita Bag as Meera, Tara's daughter
- Priyanshu Painyuli as Dev, Tara's son
- Mridanjali Rawai as Kiran, Dev's fiancée
- Suparna Marwah as Kiran's mother
- Bhagwan Tiwari as Ashok, Amar's driver
- Anushka Sawhney as an actress
- Prabhat Raghunandan as a director
- Karim Hajee as a producer
- Suchitra Tyagi as a reporter
- Amit Chakrabarty as the bank manager
- Narender Jatliy as a cook
- Sameer Jani as restaurant server
- Sanjay Bhatia as restaurant client
- Zarin Variava as restaurant client
- Brijesh Karanwal
- Navtej Johar as a dancer (cameo)
- Anil Panchal as a dancer
- Chandra Shekhar as a street artist
- Suruchi Sharma as a street artist

== Reception ==
The film was loved by the critics as well as by the audience and was for many weeks on the top of popular list of Netflix. Famous film critic Ajay Brahmbhatt tweeted immediately after watching the film : "From trailer I was guessing Once again must be lyrical film." After watching I will say its more than lyrical. It's a wonderful love story Bhawana Somaaya a Film critic wrote "saw a sensitive film Once Again must watch for all who are not so young and in love super performances from the lead." Sabash K. Jha wrote "Just finishes watching Once Again is like well cooked dish it acquires flavourful composure in a slow burn enriching fulfilling. Shefali and Neeraj are magnificent".

Sankhayan Ghosh from Filmcompanion said that Director Kanwal Sethi has a keen eye for detail. While The Lunchbox shows us how they fall in love, how they carry out their relationship over letters slipped into the dabba, and ends with the first time they decide to meet, when Once Again begins, Amar and Tara have already found each other .

Rahul Desai from The Hindu said: Two hearts in the same space, cornered into a huddle by the vacuum facing them. Much of the quiet, stream-of-consciousness film explores their hesitance to recognise these signs of their spatial dynamics (The Hindu) Trisha Gupta writes in India Today; Once Again artfully depicts a middle aged couple drifting into love. Unlike the plotted safety of Ritesh Batra's film Lunchbox though, Tara and Amar meet several times, letting the charmed flame of their phone banter flicker into unscripted disappointment. Dipti Kharude of The Quint reviewed: "The way the camera tenderly caresses Shefali in the film, the subtlest shifts in her character's emotions become discernible."

Ipshita Mitra of The Wire observed that the film "shows the coming together of two disparate yet similar stories of separation and despair woven by two broken middle-aged people like patchwork on the fabric of survival". JA Ganesh Nadar of Rediff.com wrote: "One needs a fair amount of patience to watch Once Again as it takes you through the complexities of love in the evening of the couple's lives." Johnson Thomas of The Free Press Journal called it "a sensitively handled, evocatively performed adult love story that steals its romantic conceit from Lunchbox".
