= Gandhi, My Father =

2007 Indian film by Feroz Abbas Khan

- Official poster
- Directed by: Feroz Abbas Khan
- Written by: Feroz Abbas Khan
- Based on: Harilal Gandhi: A Life by Chandulal Bhagubhai Dalal; Prakash no Padchhayo by Dinkar Joshi
- Produced by: Anil Kapoor
- Starring: Darshan Jariwala; Akshaye Khanna; Bhumika Chawla; Shefali Shah
- Cinematography: David McDonald
- Edited by: A. Sreekar Prasad
- Music by: Piyush Kanojia
- Release date: 3 August 2007
- Running time: 136 minutes
- Language: Hindi
- Budget: ₹80 million
- Box office: ₹74.9 million

Gandhi, My Father is a 2007 Indian Hindi-language biographical drama film directed by Feroz Abbas Khan. It was produced by Anil Kapoor, and released on 3 August 2007. The film stars Darshan Jariwala, Akshaye Khanna, Bhumika Chawla, and Shefali Shah.

The film explores the troubled relationship between Mahatma Gandhi and his eldest son Harilal Gandhi. The film is based upon the biography of Harilal Gandhi, titled Harilal Gandhi: A Life, by Chandulal Bhagubhai Dalal. Khan's play, Mahatma vs. Gandhi, while different from this film, had a similar theme which was based on a novel by Gujarati author Dinkar Joshi. The film was shot in South Africa and in several Indian cities, including Mumbai and Ahmedabad.

== Plot ==
Gandhi My Father paints the picture of Gandhi's intricate, complex, and strained relationship with his son, Harilal Gandhi. From the onset, the two had dreams in opposite directions. Harilal's ambition was to study abroad and become a barrister like his father, while Gandhi hoped that his son would join him and fight for his ideals and causes in India.

When Gandhi does not give Harilal the opportunity to study abroad, it comes as a blow to Harilal. He decides to abandon his father’s vision and leaves South Africa for India, where he joins his wife Gulab and children. He goes back to further his education to earn his diploma but continuously fails and ends in financial ruin. Various plans and schemes to make money fail, leaving the family destitute. Tired of his failure, Gulab returns to her parents’ house with the children, where she eventually dies from the flu epidemic. Distraught, Harilal turns to alcohol for solace and converts to Islam, only to revert to a different sect of Hinduism later on. With political tension heating up, the rift between Gandhi and his eldest son grows until it is beyond repair. Harilal finds it unbearable to live in the enormous shadow of his father. Gandhi is assassinated before the two can reconcile, and Harilal attends his father's funeral virtually as a stranger, almost unrecognisable to those around him. A short while later, he passes away, alone and in poverty, having failed to find his own identity.

== Cast ==
- Darshan Jariwala as Mahatma Gandhi
- Akshaye Khanna as Harilal Gandhi
- Bhumika Chawla as Gulab Gandhi
- Shefali Shah as Kasturba Gandhi
- Vinay Jain as Kanti Gandhi
- Mona Ambegaonkar as Prostitute

== Reception ==
Philip French of The Guardian called it "one of the most revealing and courageous movies ever to come out of India." He further wrote that "It will be an eye-opener to those whose knowledge of the Mahatma is limited to Richard Attenborough's epic biopic." Taran Adarsh of IndiaFM gave the film 4 out of 5, writing, "As a cinematic experience, GANDHI MY FATHER unfolds in the most simplistic, but compelling manner. Since the director is talking history, he ought to do the balancing act well. He reproduces facts without resorting to cinematic liberties and at the same time, simplifies everything so that the viewer can decipher it well.

Conversely, Derek Elley of the Variety wrote, "There’s enough material here for a powerful story of onstage/offstage family conflict, but the movie fails to build a dramatic head of steam across its two-hour-plus span."

== Awards ==
=== 55th National Film Awards ===
- Special Jury Award - Feroz Abbas Khan and Anil Kapoor
- Best Screenplay - Feroz Abbas Khan
- Best Supporting Actor - Darshan Jariwala

=== 2008 Zee Cine Awards ===
- Critics Award (Best Film) - Anil Kapoor
- Critics Award (Best Actress) - Shefali Shah

=== 2007 Asia Pacific Screen Awards ===
- Best Screenplay - Feroz Abbas Khan

== See also ==
- List of artistic depictions of Mohandas Karamchand Gandhi
