= Dil Dhadakne Do =

2015 Indian film by Zoya Akhtar

- Theatrical release poster
- Directed by: Zoya Akhtar
- Written by: Reema Kagti; Zoya Akhtar
- Dialogues by: Farhan Akhtar
- Produced by: Ritesh Sidhwani; Farhan Akhtar
- Starring: Anil Kapoor; Shefali Shah; Priyanka Chopra; Ranveer Singh; Anushka Sharma; Farhan Akhtar
- Narrated by: Aamir Khan
- Cinematography: Carlos Catalan
- Edited by: Anand Subaya; Manan Mehta
- Music by: Shankar–Ehsaan–Loy
- Production companies: Junglee Pictures; Excel Entertainment
- Distributed by: AA Films; Eros International
- Release date: 5 June 2015
- Running time: 173 minutes
- Country: India
- Language: Hindi
- Budget: ₹550 million
- Box office: ₹1.44 billion

Dil Dhadakne Do (transl. 'Let the heart beat') is a 2015 Indian Hindi-language family comedy drama film directed by Zoya Akhtar and produced by Ritesh Sidhwani and Farhan Akhtar under the Excel Entertainment banner. The film stars Anil Kapoor, Shefali Shah, Priyanka Chopra, Ranveer Singh, Anushka Sharma and Farhan Akhtar with a voice-over narration by Aamir Khan. The film tells the story of the Mehras, a dysfunctional family who invite their family and friends on a 10-day cruise trip to celebrate the parents' 30th wedding anniversary and later reconcile.

Zoya conceived the film as a family drama centred on a brother-sister relationship. She wanted to depict a more realistic sibling relationship in contrast to the dubious and over-the-top portrayal for which Bollywood is known. She later wrote the script with her friend and longtime collaborator Reema Kagti, while Farhan penned the dialogues. Much of the principal photography was done on Pullmantur Cruises' ship MS Sovereign while sailing across the Mediterranean and Europe, and on land in France, Spain, Italy, Tunisia, and Turkey.

The soundtrack was composed by the trio Shankar–Ehsaan–Loy, with lyrics written by Javed Akhtar. The film was released worldwide on 5 June 2015 to positive reviews from critics, who praised the performances of Kapoor, Shah, Chopra, and Singh, as well as Zoya's direction, the film's music, cinematography and costumes; however, it received criticism for its long runtime and climax. Nevertheless, it proved to be a commercial success, having grossed ₹1.44 billion (equivalent to ₹2.4 billion or US$25 million in 2026) on a budget of ₹550 million (equivalent to ₹910 million or US$9.7 million in 2026).

At the 61st Filmfare Awards, Dil Dhadakne Do received 5 nominations, including Best Supporting Actress (for both Shah and Sharma), winning Best Supporting Actor (Kapoor). It also received 9 nominations at the 2016 Screen Awards, including Best Film and Best Director (Zoya Akhtar), and won 2 awards – Best Supporting Actor (Kapoor) and Best Ensemble Cast.

== Plot ==
Kamal Mehra is a self-made billionaire businessman based in Delhi who faces imminent financial ruin as his conglomerate, AyKa, teeters on the verge of bankruptcy. This corporate stress compounds his deeply fractured relationships with his wife Neelam, daughter Ayesha, and son Kabir. Ayesha, who owns and runs a highly successful corporate travel enterprise in Mumbai, is trapped in an unhappy marriage to Manav Sangha, a controlling narcissist who harbors an underlying contempt for the Mehras. Kabir, who dreams of becoming a commercial pilot, is forced to undergo grooming to inherit his father's industrial empire.

Hoping to maintain an illusion of stability while celebrating their thirtieth wedding anniversary, Kamal and Neelam invite their affluent social circle for a ten-day luxury cruise across the Mediterranean Sea, arranged by an uncredited Ayesha and overhyped Kabir. Among the guests are the Sood family, comprising the extremely successful Lalit and his wife Naina. Kamal and Neelam covertly plan to orchestrate a marriage alliance between Kabir and the Soods' daughter, Noorie, in a strategic bid to secure a massive financial investment from Lalit to liquidate AyKa's debts. However, the plan derails when Kabir falls in love with Farah Ali, a British-Pakistani dancer performing on the cruise. Concurrently, Noorie has secretly fallen for Rana Khanna, the son of her family's bitter rivals.

As the voyage progresses, social pressures mount on Ayesha and Manav to conceive a child; unknown to anyone, Ayesha has been consistently taking birth control pills to avoid anchoring herself to Manav. Tensions escalate further when Sunny Gill, the son of Kamal's long-term manager Amrish, joins the cruise as a journalist. Sunny and Ayesha were deeply in love during their youth, but Kamal had intentionally separated them by financing Sunny’s scholarship to Yale University to prevent a marriage below their social standing. Unlike the patriarchal Manav, Sunny openly respects Ayesha's fierce independence, and the two find themselves reviving their repressed romantic feelings; in the process, however, Kamal discovers Ayesha has been distancing herself from Manav and threatens her to resolve their conflicts, refusing to "take her back".

Neelam witnesses Kamal flirting with a female guest, driving her to confront her own long-standing complicity in tolerating his past infidelities. Ayesha, overwhelmed by her environment, confronts Sunny regarding their past, culminating in a sudden, passionate kiss. To buy time, Kabir and Noorie construct a deceptive, fake engagement plan designed to placate their families while allowing Noorie to sneak around with Rana. However, when Farah discovers the impending arrangement, she terminates her relationship with Kabir. Shortly after, Kamal catches Noorie making out with Rana and realizes the prospective business merger may well be collapsing. Enroute to drop off his younger niece Putlu, he suffers what looks like a heart attack, but is medically diagnosed as an acute case of gastritis. Putlu informs Ayesha, who then calls Kabir and Neelam.

A cathartic confrontation follows within the Mehra family when Kabir, nudged by Kamal's proposed strikedown of the marriage with Noorie and the alliance with the Soods, admits to being aware of Noorie's truth all along. He highlights Ayesha as the sibling with the business acumen Kamal is desperately seeking for AyKa and urges them to support her desire for a divorce while giving her the position she rightfully deserves in the company. When Kamal and Neelam initially resist, claiming that marriage is an absolute lifelong commitment and "bringing Ayesha back home" would earn them ridicule, Kabir openly points out the hypocrisy of their own fraudulent partnership, noting that their social circle has been aware of Kamal’s serial adultery and Neelam’s desperate submission for years. Neelam later breaks down, admitting she stayed only because her own family would have ostracized her. Deeply remorseful, Kamal begs for her forgiveness.

The family dynamic shifts permanently when Kamal attempts to facilitate a reconciliation between Ayesha and Manav. He witnesses firsthand the patronizing and emotionally abusive manner in which Manav treats his daughter. Intervening aggressively, Kamal fiercely warns Manav never to touch Ayesha again, ordering him and his mother to exit their lives permanently. Both parents apologize to Ayesha and formally sanction her divorce.

Learning that Farah has been fired from her cruise job for violating staff protocol regarding passenger relationships, Kabir races to locate her, only to find she has already been sent ashore. Backed by his family, Kabir publicly rejects the marriage alliance with Noorie, enabling her to freely pursue Rana. To catch up with Farah, Kabir recklessly leaps off the moving cruise ship into the ocean, trusting his family to orchestrate a rescue. Kamal, Neelam, and Ayesha commandeer a ship lifeboat with the assistance of their allies. Before descending, Ayesha asks Sunny if he will wait for her, to which he promises to do so indefinitely. The Mehras successfully pull Kabir from the water and speed toward the shore to intercept Farah, evading the pursuing ship security crew as a unified, genuinely happy family.

== Cast ==
The cast is listed below:

- Anil Kapoor as Kamal Mehra: Ayesha and Kabir's father
- Shefali Shah as Neelam Kamal Mehra: Kamal's wife
- Priyanka Chopra as Ayesha Mehra: Kamal and Neelam's daughter
- Ranveer Singh as Kabir Mehra: Kamal and Neelam's son
- Anushka Sharma as Farah Ali: Kabir's girlfriend
- Farhan Akhtar as Sunny Gill: Ayesha's love interest
- Rahul Bose as Manav Sangha: Ayesha's ex-husband
- Zarina Wahab as Smita Pranav Sangha
- Vikrant Massey as Rana Khanna
- Ridhima Sud as Noorie Sood
- Pawan Chopra as Prem Mehra
- Ayesha Raza Mishra as Indu Prem Mehra
- Parmeet Sethi as Lalit Sood
- Dolly Minhas as Naina Lalit Sood
- Manoj Pahwa as Vinod Khanna
- Divya Seth as Saira Jamaal Hashmi
- Preeti Mamgain as Vandana Vinod Khanna
- Shireesh Sharma as Jamaal Hashmi
- Ikhlaque Khan as Amrish Gill
- Vandana Sajnani as Anjana "Anju" Chopra
- Sarah Hashmi as Divya Mehra
- Khushi Dubey as Putlu Mehra
- Aamir Khan as Pluto Mehra, the dog (voice-over)

== Production ==
=== Development ===
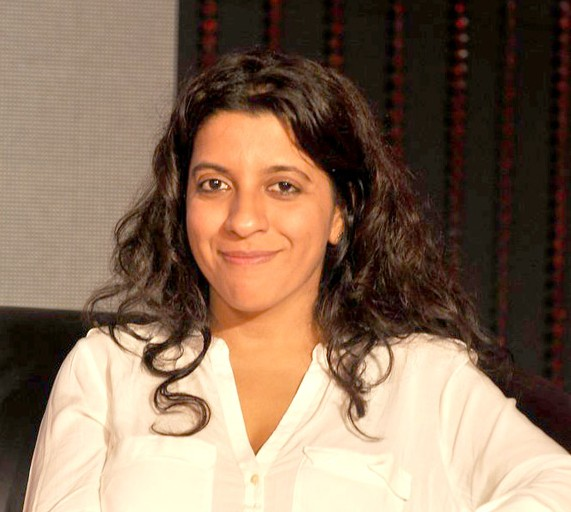
Zoya Akhtar had always intended to make a family drama with a brother-sister relationship as its core narrative.

When Excel Entertainment announced its upcoming films in March 2012, one of them was Zoya Akhtar's next film following Zindagi Na Milegi Dobara (2011). It was reported that she was working on a script and that filming was due to start in December 2012. Akhtar dismissed the reports, saying she was yet to start writing her next script. In May that year, media reports suggested Akhtar was already writing her next film. That July, it was reported the script was about siblings partially based on Akhtar and her brother Farhan. Farhan later denied reports of the film being autobiographical, saying it had nothing to do with their real life relationship and that it is entirely a work of fiction. In November 2012, Akhtar said she was still writing the script and that the film was a family drama.

Akhtar co-wrote the story and screenplay with her long-time friend and collaborator Reema Kagti. She had always aspired to make a family drama with a brother-sister relationship at its core. She felt such topics not been well represented in Indian films, and that the brother-sister relationship bond has always been shown "wrapped in rituals" and never portrayed as it really is. She believed the theme of brother-sister relationships "generally have cheesy representations. They are never at ease. This is one of the most important relationships in the world because nobody else shares your parents. I wanted to show that relationship in Dil Dhadakne Do." Akhtar also wanted to showcase the quirkiness of a dysfunctional family, with different layers to each family member, saying, "the beauty of families lies in their flaws".

When asked whether the film had any similarities with her own life and family, Akhtar said it had none and that the only thing common to herself and the film's characters was the bond between her and her brother; all their problems and conflicts were unalike. She said the film was a partly fictionalised version of people around her, such as her friends and their families, and her observations from literature and news articles. Kagti and Akhtar revealed that some of their material came from observing people of Delhi during their friends' back-to-back, elite-class wedding parties as they were finishing the script; they made notes about people's behaviour and demeanour, and incorporated these into their script. After finalising the characters, they felt something was missing, so they added Pluto, the family dog, as an observer. The completed film has 25 characters and a dog.

When asked about interweaving travel in the narrative, Akhtar said she and Kagti wanted a device to bring all the characters—the entire family—together. She said the film could have been set anywhere, such as a hill station, but they chose to set it on a cruise ship because the characters would not be able to leave. Akhtar called it a metaphor for the bigger journey that every family undertakes; the characters are stuck together on a ship in the middle of an ocean and could not leave if they wanted to. The film's title Dil Dhadakne Do was chosen because Akhtar wanted a catchy, easily identifiable title; it makes a reference to an eponymous song, featured on the soundtrack and in the opening credits of Zindagi Na Milegi Dobara.

=== Casting and characters ===
During the initial scripting phase, in May 2012, media reports suggested cousins Kareena Kapoor and Ranbir Kapoor had been approached to play the siblings and had accepted the parts. In late December 2012, Hrithik Roshan and Katrina Kaif joined the cast to play the Kapoors' characters' love interests respectively. In June 2013, Ranbir Kapoor dropped out of the film due to scheduling conflicts with his other projects; he was replaced by Ranveer Singh. It was then reported that after her cousin dropped out, Kareena Kapoor was having second thoughts about appearing in the film; the opportunity to act alongside her cousin had been the main attraction for her. She left the production later that month, saying she could not leave her family for the required three months and calling her decision "her loss". In late June 2013, Akhtar approached Priyanka Chopra to part that role, and Chopra accepted; it marked her reunion with Farhan after Don 2 (2011). Later in October the same year, Anil Kapoor was confirmed to play the role of Chopra and Singh's father in the film. It was also reported that Dimple Kapadia could possibly play his wife, but this was not to be.

In December 2013, Farhan confirmed he was playing a crucial role in his sister's film. In January 2014, Anushka Sharma was cast for the role of Singh's love interest. Madhuri Dixit, Tabu and Raveena Tandon were all approached to play Chopra and Singh's mother in the film; although they liked the part, all of them turned down the role because they did not want to play a mother. Akhtar later approached Shefali Shah for the part, which she accepted; it marked her second collaboration with Farhan after Karthik Calling Karthik. Newcomer Ridhima Sud joined the cast in June 2014. A few days later, Rahul Bose was cast to play the role of Manav (Chopra's husband) in the film. Zarina Wahab joined the cast to play Chopra's mother-in-law. Parmeet Sethi was later cast in a supporting role, reuniting him with Farhan almost a decade after Lakshya.

Although meant for a surprise, the details about Aamir Khan's voiceover performance as the family dog Pluto was leaked before the film's release. Javed Akhtar had initially provided the voiceover for Pluto. After watching the film weeks before the release, however, Akhtar asked Aamir to do the voiceover and the actor accepted, saying, "I had loved the film so much that I was just happy to be a part of it ... I think it is a great film to be part of".

Compared with the rest of the cast, Akhtar spent a whole year persuading Anil Kapoor to sign up for the film. Farhan also spoke to him about the role. However, when Javed approached him on his daughter's behalf, aided by Aamir, he finally accepted the role. Kapoor described his role of Kamal Mehra as a "manipulative patriarch" and a businessman who "has no qualms about manipulating people, even his own family members, to achieve his goal". He said, "Kamal is a self-made man and does not want to lose [his business empire] and will do anything to save it". Kapoor found playing his character very exciting, being completely opposite to his real self; a patriarch whose company, rather than his family, comes first.

Shah called her character, Neelam Mehra, a "Delhi elite society queen bee" with multiple layers, saying, "It looks like nothing can put a chink in her armour, but inside, she is a vulnerable and lost person". She said her character shows an artificial side about her marriage while facing the world, opposed to her behaviour in their home: "It's not one of the best marriages. She hates what’s happened to both of them. But when they come in front of the world, she will stand by her husband." Her character discriminates between her son and her daughter; she said, "She is evidently partial to her son. With her daughter, she displays a mentality typical of many Indian mothers. Even though her daughter is in a bad marriage as well, she discourages her from taking a divorce." Shah said accepted the part because it "was one of the best scripts I had read in a very long time. It was sharp, wicked, and emotional, without being melodramatic." To prepare for her role, she formed an outline of her character by forming Neelam's history and personality.

Chopra has described her character, Ayesha Mehra, as strong but also feminine and gentle, noting her inner strength. She said Ayesha has complicated emotions, and that she "has no idea what she wants and she keeps changing her mind, probably like most women ... that is exactly what Ayesha does. She doesn't know which direction to go in. She actually has no opinion on love or marriage, but just wants to be able to feel that she can be loved." Chopra had to shed the muscle weight she gained for playing the boxer in Mary Kom (2014). She said, "I was not muscular but had acquired bulked-up physique. I had to be in right shape as I was playing a girly role. I had to ... go on a crash diet and lose shape." Singh called his character, Kabir Mehra, a privileged, "born with a silver spoon" kind of person who wants to pursue different things other than inherit his father's fortune. He said, "Ever since his childhood, he was raised to take over his father's company. But this isn't what he wants to do. He loves planes, he wants to be a pilot. Because of this miscommunication he is in a lot of pain." Khan described Pluto as a "very philosophical" dog who is "really into observing human nature and has a take on everything".

=== Filming ===
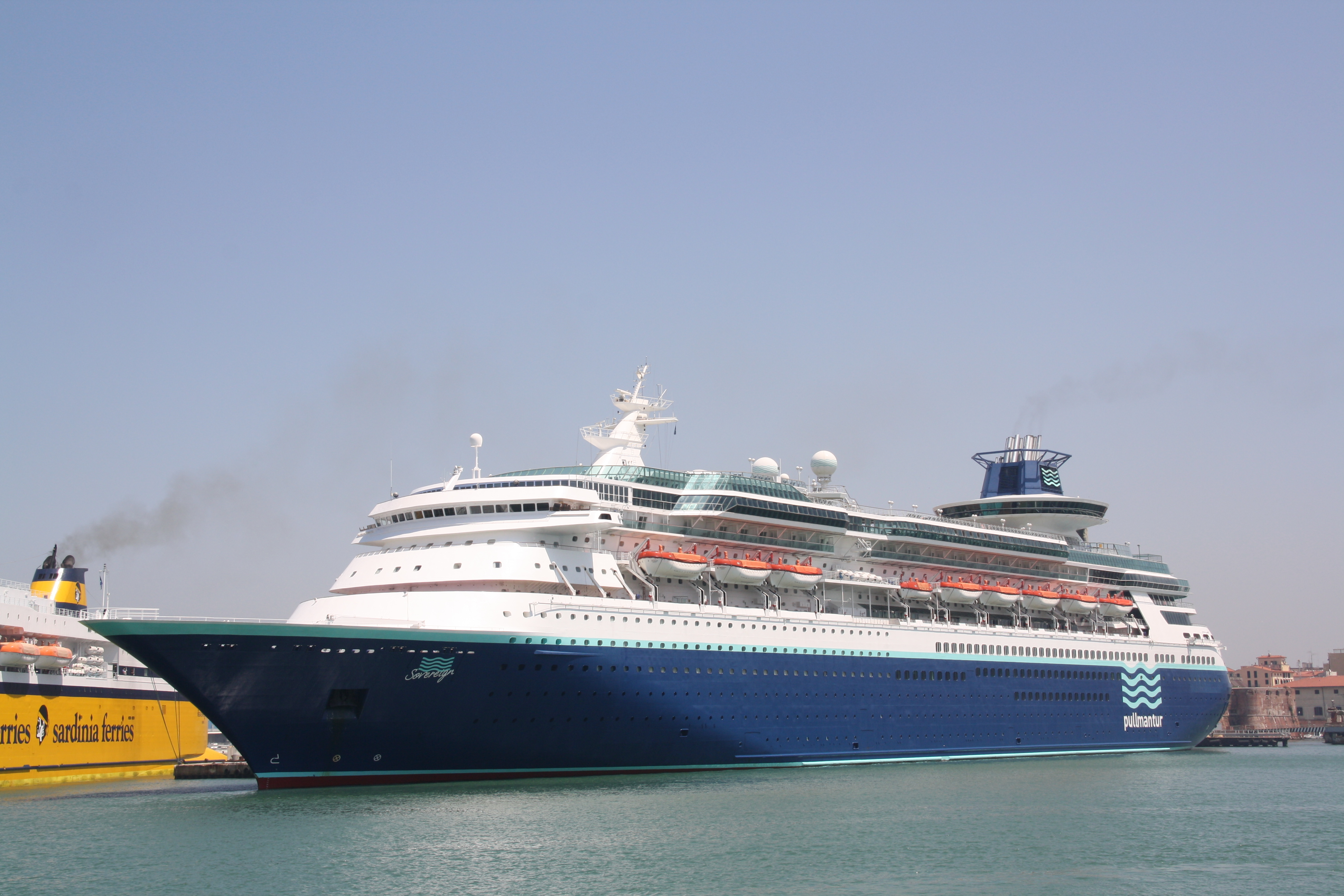
The film was extensively filmed on the MS Sovereign

Principal photography began on 17 May 2014 on the Pullmantur Cruises ship MS Sovereign throughout the Mediterranean Sea and onshore in France, Spain, Tunisia, Turkey and Italy. Filming on the ship was done over a non-consecutive period of five weeks; the cast and crew members would board the ship at Barcelona and would film the scenes while en route to different destinations; five different places in five weeks, where the cast and crew would shoot the onshore scenes. Onshore filming took two months, finishing on 18 July 2014. Filming took ninety days, finishing in early August 2014. The second and final schedule began in mid-August 2014 in Mumbai, and was completed on 23 September 2014.

Filming also took place in several locations in Turkey, such as Antalya, Cappadocia and Istanbul. For one scene set in Istanbul's Sophia Museum, tourists and museum staff were used as extras for the sequence, which took six hours to film. For a sequence featuring Chopra and Bose's characters playing squash, Chopra, helped by Bose, had to learn the sport on set. The pre-production work was a challenge for the makers, who had to plan everything in detail; Akhtar and her team reconnoitred to find perfect places to shoot the film. Akhtar found the filming unforgettable, saying, "Can you imagine the whole crew is in a new country everyday?! That is what it is like to be on a cruise ship in the Mediterranean. It was logistically insane, visually gorgeous and emotionally cathartic."

Neil Patel handled the production design, replacing the Akhtars' regular collaborator Suzanne Caplan Merwanji. Akhtar's frequent collaborator Carlos Catalan provided the cinematography, and Anand Subaya and Manan Ashwin Mehta edited the film. Arjun Bhasin designed all of the film's costumes. Bosco–Caesar choreographed the songs; The song "Gallan Goodiyaan" was shot in a single five-minute take. It required detailed planning and choreography, which the cast rehearsed before filming.

== Soundtrack ==
Dil Dhadakne Do's soundtrack was composed by the trio Shankar–Ehsaan–Loy and Javed Akhtar wrote the lyrics. The album consists of five original songs. The vocals are performed by Priyanka Chopra, Farhan Akhtar, Sukriti Kakar, Siddharth Mahadevan, Shankar Mahadevan, Yashita Sharma, Manish Kumar Tipu, Sukhwinder Singh, Sunidhi Chauhan, Vishal Dadlani, Divya Kumar and Alyssa Mendonsa. It was released on 2 May 2015 by T-Series.

== Release ==
Dil Dhadakne Do was one of the most highly anticipated films of 2015, owing to its ensemble star cast and the success of Akhtar's previous films Luck By Chance and Zindagi Na Milegi Dobara. The first-look teaser poster, photographed from behind the 6 pivotal characters and their family dog sunbathing on a cruise deck was released on 21 July 2014, almost a year before the scheduled release. The poster did not reveal the actors' looks, instead making the audience puzzle about the actors from behind. A few days later, the first full poster revealing the position of the actors photographed from the front was revealed. In April 2015, seven character posters, including one for the family dog Pluto, were released. The poster releases generated much hype for the film. The trailer release was highly anticipated in the media because the plot was kept secret.

Emphasising the theme of the film, Akhtar and Kapoor hosted a private screening of the trailer for their friends and family. The official theatrical release posters were released before the trailer. The almost-three-minute official trailer was released on 15 April 2015, garnering over one million views in less than 24 hours. The trailer was well received by the media, who deemed it promising. Alaka Sahani of The Indian Express called it "overwhelming" and wrote, "The top-view of the cruise line with expansive ocean as the backdrop, stunning foreign locales and beautiful people in their stylish best make for compelling visuals. But scratch the surface, and you find a dysfunctional family trying hard to act normal to the world."

Dil Dhadakne Do released on 5 June 2015 in 2,300 screens worldwide on a budget of ₹580 million. According to an analysis by Box Office India, the film was likely to perform better in major Indian cities than in smaller centres, but predicted it would perform much better overseas due to its niche content. Distributed by Big Home Entertainment, it was released on DVD in all regions on 30 August 2015 as a two-disc pack in NTSC widescreen format; bonus content included the making of the film and deleted scenes. A VCD version was released at the same time. The film's Blu-ray version was released on 5 September 2015.

Dil Dhadakne Do had its Indian television premiere on 24 October 2015 on Zee Cinema; it marked the beginning of a longstanding satellite partnership between the Zee Network and Excel Entertainment. The network renewed several Excel films from the past catalogue, including Dil Chahta Hai, Lakshya, Don, Rock On!! and Luck by Chance, which were all broadcast on &Pictures in the run-up to the film's subsequent premiere on the channel. Over the next decade, with the exception of Fukrey, all Excel Entertainment productions had been renewed by the network.

== Reception ==
Dil Dhadakne Do received positive reviews, receiving praise for the cast performances, humour, cinematography, music, costumes and direction, but it received criticism for its running time and climax. In a 4-star review for Mumbai Mirror, critic Kunal Guha described the film as an "emotional roller-coaster", comparing Akhtar's direction to that of Woody Allen and Wes Anderson, and complimented the performances of the cast. Rajiv Vijayakar from India-West gave a rating of 4 stars, describing it as "entertaining with stellar performances", praising Akhtar's direction and writing, "Zoya gets the emotions right by making the entertainment riveting and the experience full of many perceptive insights into basic relationships". Srijana Mitra Das of The Times of India gave the film 4 stars, praising the performances of the lead actors and writing, "On this ship, a few bolts could be tighter. But these are fleeting clouds on an otherwise beautiful sea, hosting a cruise ... while searching beyond Bollywood's emotional Botox for a family's warts - and its heart." Shubha Shetty-Saha of Mid-Day gave the film 4 stars and complimented the story, stating, "If this film looks like an entertaining, escapist film at the outset, it is, but it is also much deeper than that". She also appreciated the performances, particularly those of Chopra and Singh, writing, "These two blazing talents are magical when they come together sharing what perhaps could be one of the best sibling chemistry in Hindi films".

The reviewer from Bollywood Hungama gave the film 3.5 stars, praising Akhtar's direction for "[pulling] off such a magnificent film with such utmost ease". Writing for Hindustan Times, film critic Anupama Chopra rated the film 3.5 stars, commending the performances - particularly those of Kapoor, Shah and Chopra - and the high production value, writing, "There are soaring top shots of the ship, of gorgeous towns in Turkey and Greece, and of staggering fashions". Rachit Gupta of Filmfare described the film as a "spunky comedy, straight from the heart", attributing the performances of the lead actors as the prime reason for the film's success. Sonia Chopra from Sify also gave 3.5 stars, calling Dil Dhadakne Do a film with a "robust heartbeat", admiring Akhtar's ability to create "real and interesting" characters and writing, "Zoya Akhtar brings in several delightful elements of her filmmaking style - there's the gorgeous cast playing interesting characters, the overt and covert equations between them, the hints at societal hypocrisy and sexism, the romance, the gorgeous locales, and the measured pace".

Raja Sen of Rediff.com gave a 3 out of 5 star rating explaining that "Despite its flaws, I find myself looking back at Dil Dhadakne Do and smiling. Because of Kapoor, a man who is unerringly good when given enough elbow room, and here he’s silver-maned and smooth and selfish and playing his part with superb gusto...And because of Ranveer, who owns his moments of frustration, of resignation, of outrage and of wry comebacks." Film critic Rajeev Masand of News18 gave 3 stars, appreciating the performances of the lead actors - especially that of Kapoor and Shah - calling them "absolutely riveting". He praised the humour in the screenplay and concluded that the film is "easy and breezy, and packed with terrific actors who appear to be enjoying themselves", although he criticised the pacing and climax of the film, calling it "silly". In a 3 star review, film critic Mayank Shekhar of ABP News said that "patiently drawing out emotions from every character" made the film "horrendously long [and] too languidly paced", although he called the film ""intensely real, intrinsically adult, with several sharp observations about relationships and life". Scoring the film 3 stars, Sukanya Verma of Rediff.com wrote that Dil Dhadakne Do "unravels like an entire season of soap opera condensed into a nearly three-hour movie", but found it "too facile to rise above the charming fluff".

Ritika Bhatia of Business Standard wrote that the film "does have its enjoyable moments, but with a three-hour runtime, it fails to sail the high seas", and termed the film "ambitious" but "meandering". Shilpa Jamkhandikar of Reuters called it "Akhtar's weakest film yet, because she tries to tell too many stories at once and tells none entirely". Sarita A. Tanwar of Daily News and Analysis gave the film 2.5 stars, and said it would have "been a lot of fun [if] had it been shorter, crisper and less indulgent".

=== Box office ===
Dil Dhadakne Do had a decent opening, with collections of ₹100 million (equivalent to ₹160 million or US$1.8 million in 2026) on its opening day. Collections rose 20% on its second day, collecting ₹120 million (equivalent to ₹200 million or US$2.1 million in 2026), and another 20% on its third day, with collections of ₹140 million (equivalent to ₹230 million or US$2.5 million in 2026) for the opening domestic weekend of ₹360 million (equivalent to ₹590 million or US$6.3 million in 2026). Upon its release, the film recorded the highest overseas opening of the year for an Indian film, collecting ₹195 million (equivalent to ₹320 million or US$3.4 million in 2026) in its opening weekend.

Notably, the film debuted at number 9 at the UK box office, where it earned $330,000 in its opening weekend. The total worldwide opening weekend collections stood at ₹675 million (equivalent to ₹1.1 billion or US$12 million in 2026), making it the top worldwide opener among Indian films at the time of its release. On its first Monday, the film's collections dropped 40%, earning another ₹57.5 million (equivalent to ₹95 million or US$1.0 million in 2026). It earned ₹550 million (equivalent to ₹910 million or US$9.7 million in 2026) in its first week at the domestic box office and over ₹980 million (equivalent to ₹1.6 billion or US$17 million in 2026) worldwide. In its second weekend, Dil Dhadakne Do earned ₹100 million (equivalent to ₹160 million or US$1.8 million in 2026). During its theatrical run, the film grossed over ₹1 billion (equivalent to ₹1.6 billion or US$18 million in 2026) in India and a further ₹450 million (equivalent to ₹740 million or US$7.9 million in 2026) worldwide, for a worldwide total of ₹1.45 billion (equivalent to ₹2.4 billion or US$26 million in 2026).

== Accolades ==
Dil Dhadakne Do received a number of accolades, particularly for the actors. It earned 5 Filmfare nominations, winning Best Supporting Actor for Kapoor. The film was nominated in 9 categories at the 2016 Screen Awards, including Best Film, Best Director for Akhtar and Best Actress for Chopra. It went on to win two; Best Supporting Actor for Kapoor and Best Ensemble Cast. At the 2015 Stardust Awards, the film garnered 5 nominations, including Actor of the Year – Female for Chopra and Actor of the Year – Male for Singh, winning three awards: Best Supporting Actor for Kapoor, Best Supporting Actress for Shah and Best Costume Design.
