= The Last Lear =

2007 Indian film by Rituparno Ghosh

- Movie poster
- Directed by: Rituparno Ghosh
- Written by: Rituparno Ghosh; Utpal Dutt
- Produced by: Arindam Chaudhuri
- Starring: Amitabh Bachchan; Preity Zinta; Arjun Rampal; Divya Dutta; Shefali Shah; Jisshu Sengupta; Prosenjit Chatterjee
- Cinematography: Abhik Mukhopadhyay
- Edited by: Arghyakamal Mitra
- Music by: Raja Narayan Deb; Sanjoy Das
- Production company: Planman Motion Pictures
- Distributed by: PVR Pictures
- Release dates: 9 September 2007 (TIFF); 12 September 2008 (Worldwide)
- Running time: 130 minutes
- Country: India
- Language: English

The Last Lear is a 2007 Indian English-language drama film directed by Rituparno Ghosh. The film won the National Award of India for Best Feature Film in English in 2007. The film stars Amitabh Bachchan, Preity Zinta, Arjun Rampal, Divya Dutta, Shefali Shah and Jisshu Sengupta. Shefali Shah won the Best Supporting Actress National Award for her role in the movie. It was produced by Arindam Chaudhuri of Planman Motion Pictures.

Basing the script on Utpal Dutt's semiautobiographical play Aajker Shahjahan, Rituparno Ghosh penned it in 2006, and turned to the actors in February 2007, all of whom accepted the offer. The film began shooting from 28 February 2007 to 10 April 2007; principal shooting took place in Kolkata and some shooting took place in Mussoorie, Uttarakhand. Dubbing for the film ended on 31 August 2007.

The Last Lear premiered at the 2007 Toronto International Film Festival on 9 September and received a significant reception, earning many accolades after being showcased at a Gala Presentation.

The film was later showcased at the London Film Festival, and the International Film Festival of India in Goa. The film was received positively by critics with many saying that Bachchan has given a career best performance.

== Plot ==
The story revolves around Harish Mishra (Amitabh Bachchan), a retired Shakespearean theatre actor who spent precisely thirty years and nine months on stage and then suddenly quit, and his first and last act as a cinema artist. He is immensely passionate about Shakespeare, believes that nothing even comparable can ever be written, knows all his plays by heart, lives in those stories, condemns modern cinema, and considers theatre as a much higher artform for directors and actors to convey their message to an audience.

It is Diwali, a time when box offices are flooded with new releases, and Shabnam (Preity Zinta) has to attend the premiere of her latest movie, The Mask. However, she decides to visit her co-star Harish and heads to a cubbyhole in old Kolkata, where Harish is bedridden in a coma. He is being taken care of by Vandana (Shefali Shah) and a nurse, Ivy (Divya Dutta). Vandana treats Shabnam with spite as she blames her and the entire cast and crew for Harish's condition. But soon they are seen bonding over tea and are involved in a conversation about Harish. In flashbacks, their story and equation with Harish emerge.

The movie sees parallel narration from Goutam (Jisshu Sengupta), a journalist who recalls his encounters with the veteran actor. He had suggested Harish for the lead role to his elder brother Siddharth (Arjun Rampal), who happens to be an ambitious perfectionist director. After a casual meeting with Harish, Siddharth realizes that to convince Harish to act in his film, he has to win his trust and establish a relationship with him. And, hence, the impatient young auteur attempts to win the trust and collaboration of the aged performer, who sits raging against the modern world from the sanctuary of his study.

Harish finally agrees to act in the film. Shooting happens in the stunning Himalayan foothills of Mussoorie. On the sets, he befriends Shabnam and teaches her lessons on acting, life, and Shakespeare. As the story unfolds, one gets to know his relationship with Vandana, the reason behind his quitting theatre, and last but not least, the reason for his illness. The Last Lear becomes a captivating reflection on the comparative artifices of stagecraft and cinema.

== Cast ==
- Amitabh Bachchan as Harish Mishra
- Preity Zinta as Shabnam
- Arjun Rampal as Siddharth Kumar
- Shahbaz Khan as Ramesh
- Sudip Mukherjee as Rajeev (Voice dubbed by Priyanshu Chatterjee)
- Divya Dutta as Ivy
- Shefali Shah as Vandana
- Jisshu Sengupta as Goutam Kumar
- Prosenjit Chatterjee as Palash
- Anil Kuriakose as Venky

== Reception ==
Nirpal Dhaliwal of The Guardian called it "The most god-awful film I have ever seen", criticizing its use of rather hammy English language than Hindi and mentioning that the main actor, Amitabh Bachchan, is a combination of Steve McQueen, James Stewart and Sean Connery all rolled into one but in this film he is closer to Bruce Forsyth and Derek Jacobi.

Janet Gruttsman of Reuters mentioned that the film does not have any song and dance routines which are usual highlights in Bollywood cinema. IndiaGlitz praised the film's cinematography and acting but criticized its screenplay, especially the ending. Sukanya Verma of Rediff.com gave it 3 out of 5 stars saying that "[The problem with The Last Lear] is that while Ghosh builds Harry's aura to perfection, everyone around him fails to reach out."

== Awards ==
- 2009: Star Screen Award for Best Film in English
- 2009: National Film Award for Best Feature Film in English
- 2009: National Film Award for Best Supporting Actress - Shefali Shah
