= Dedh Ishqiya (soundtrack) =

Dedh Ishqiya (Original Motion Picture Soundtrack)

Soundtrack album by Vishal Bhardwaj
- Released: 19 December 2013
- Recorded: 2012–2013
- Studios: Studio Satya, Mumbai
- Genre: Feature film soundtrack
- Length: 42:49
- Language: Hindi
- Label: Shemaroo Entertainment Audios
- Producer: Vishal Bhardwaj

Vishal Bhardwaj chronology
Ek Thi Daayan (2013)	Dedh Ishqiya (Original Motion Picture Soundtrack) (2013)	Haider (2014)
External audio
- Audio Jukebox on YouTube

Dedh Ishqiya (Original Motion Picture Soundtrack) is the soundtrack to the 2014 film of the same name, directed by Abhishek Chaubey and co-written and produced by Vishal Bhardwaj. A sequel to Ishqiya (2010), the film stars Naseeruddin Shah and Arshad Warsi reprising their roles from the previous film, alongside Madhuri Dixit and Huma Qureshi. Bhardwaj also composed and produced the eight-song soundtrack with lyrics written by Gulzar. The background score is composed by Clinton Cerejo. The soundtrack was released under the Shemaroo Entertainment Audios on 19 December 2013.

== Background ==
Like the predecessor, Chaubey influenced the film's musical landscape from 1980s Hindi films composed by R. D. Burman and S. D. Burman, and the ghazals which he grew up listening in his childhood. The song "Hamari Atariya" is a re-recorded version of the 1950s original song performed by Begum Akhtar; the new recording was performed by Rekha Bhardwaj who sang two songs for the predecessor. Rahat Fateh Ali Khan performed the song "Dil Ka Mizaaj Ishqiya", after previously singing "Dil Toh Bachcha Hai Ji" from the predecessor.

The song "Horn OK Please" is a rap number written and performed by Yo Yo Honey Singh. At first, when Bhardwaj approached Singh through telephonic conversation, he considered it to be a prank call, but after he was inquired to write rap on verses written by Gulzar he eventually agreed. It was the first time Gulzar had written rap for a song; the rap verses were written for Warsi's character and has North Indian influences.

== Release ==
The song "Hamari Atariya Pe" was released first with an accompanying music video on 3 December 2013. A teaser for the song "Dil Ka Mizaaj Ishqiya" was released on 12 December, and the full song was released the following day. The complete soundtrack album was distributed by Shemaroo Entertainment Audios and released on 19 December 2013. It was made available to stream and download on the mobile application for the film. However, the song "Horn OK Please" was announced after the album's release, and was made exclusively available through the digital music platform iTunes on 24 December 2013, and released to streaming on 26 December. A music video was also released on the same day.

== Reception ==
Vipin Nair of Music Aloud gave 8.5 (out of 10) and summarized that while the album "misses a gem like Dil Toh Bachcha Hai Ji, [the] soundtrack scores higher than its predecessor." Karthik Srinivasan of Milliblog wrote "Vishal, the composer, rises to the occasion, as usual!" Aditi Chandra, writing for Hindustan Times rated it four out of five stars summarizing "Dedh Ishqiya is a complete package. The album slowly grows on listeners and is a must hear." Prateek Sur of Bollywood Life wrote "By bringing in local flavour and not opting for popular tastes and funky sounds, Vishal Bhardwaj has done a great job of creating a potential hit album."

In contrast, Joginder Tuteja, writing for Rediff.com rated two-and-a-half stars and wrote "Unlike Ishqiya's hit soundtrack, Dedh Ishqiya falls way short". Bryan Durham of The Times of India wrote "With a couple of great tracks to keep returning to and the rest simply okay, we’re not completely in love with Dedh Ishqiya and hope it could have been much better." A critic from The Indian Express summarized "Despite some touches of genius, not a single song had me swoon, a quality all the Vishal Bharadwaj songs have had in the past."

== Track listing ==
All lyrics are written by Gulzar.

Dedh Ishqiya (Original Motion Picture Soundtrack) track listing
No.	Title	Singer(s)	Length
1.	"Dil Ka Mizaaj Ishqiya"	Rahat Fateh Ali Khan	6:22
2.	"Hamari Atariya"	Rekha Bhardwaj	4:08
3.	"Zabaan Jale Hai"	Rahat Fateh Ali Khan	5:23
4.	"Jagaave Saari Raina"	Rekha Bhardwaj, Birju Maharaj	5:38
5.	"Kya Hoga"	Jazim Sharma, Master Saleem, Shahid Mallya, Jamal Akbar	7:53
6.	"Dil Ka Mizaaj Ishqiya" (remix)	Rahat Fateh Ali Khan	4:43
7.	"Horn OK Please"	Yo Yo Honey Singh, Sukhwinder Singh, Anushka Manchanda	4:38
8.	"Horn Ok Please" (remix)	Yo Yo Honey Singh, Sukhwinder Singh, Anushka Manchanda	4:04
Total length:			42:49

== Accolades ==
Accolades for Dedh Ishqiya (Original Motion Picture Soundtrack)
Award	Date of ceremony (Note: Date is linked to the article about the awards held that year, wherever possible.)	Category	Recipient(s)	Result	Ref.
Filmfare Awards	31 January 2015	Best Female Playback Singer	Rekha Bhardwaj (for "Hamari Atariya Pe")	Nominated	
Global Indian Music Academy Awards	24 February 2015	Best Engineer – Film Album	Eric Pillai	Nominated	
Global Indian Music Academy Awards	24 February 2015	Best Background Score	Clinton Cerejo	Nominated	
Global Indian Music Academy Awards	24 February 2015	Best Lyricist	Gulzar (for "Dil Ka Mizaaj Ishqiya")	Nominated	
Screen Awards	14 January 2015	Best Female Playback Singer	Rekha Bhardwaj (for "Hamari Atariya Pe")	Nominated	
