= Gaurav Dhingra =

Film producer

Gaurav Dhingra गौरव ढिंगरा
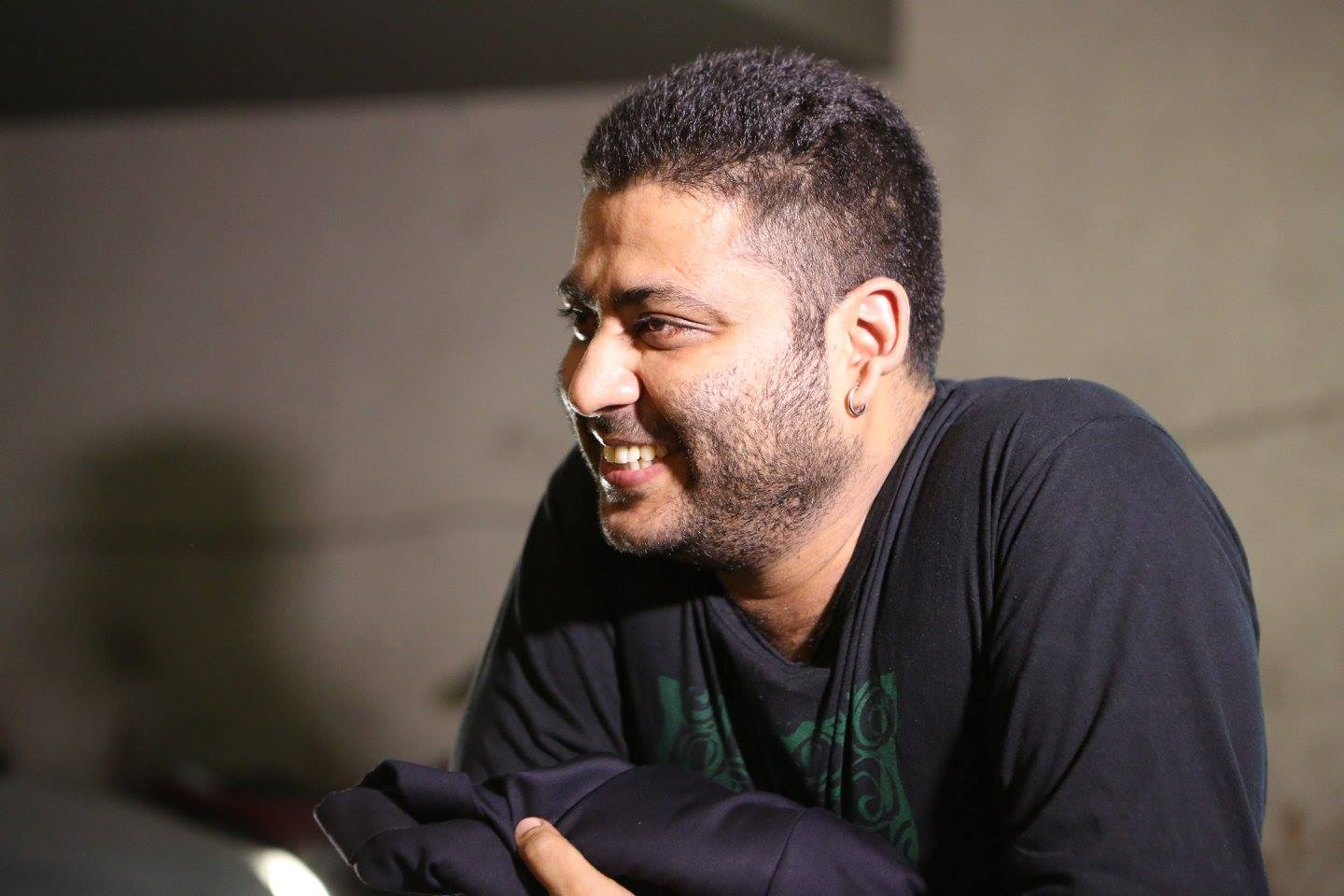
- Born: 24 March 1980 (age 45); New Delhi, India
- Occupations: International Film and Television producer, Film Entrepreneur, Co Founder & Producer Jungle Book Entertainment, Founder Organized Chaos, Founder Oasis Motion Pictures Pvt.
- Years active: 2003- Present
- Spouse: Shambhawi Dhingra
- Website: https://junglebook.studio

Gaurav Dhingra (born 24 March 1980) is an International film and television producer and film entrepreneur. He is the Founder of Jungle Book Entertainment along with Pan Nalin, director of award-winning films like Samsara and Valley of Flowers.

== Early days ==
Gaurav did his Post Graduate Diploma in Content Creation and Management (PGDCCM) from School Of Convergence, New Delhi. He went on to assist Producer Bobby Bedi of Kaleidoscope Entertainment. Learning the craft and nuances of Film making and production by taking on various roles for Mangal Pandey: The Rising, Maqbool, Valley of Flowers, The Myth and American Daylight.

== Career ==
In 2015, he produced Angry Indian Goddesses, touted as India's first female buddy film and the recipient of the People's Choice Award at Toronto International Film Festival and BNL People's Choice Award at the 10th Rome Film Festival. It was sold theatrically in 67 countries and was acquired by Netflix Worldwide.

He is recognized as a part of the new wave of Independent Indian cinema. He has also co-produced films like Haraamkhor, Vakratunda Mahakaaya and Peddlers. Peddlers premiered to critical acclaim at Cannes and Haraamkhor was a critical and commercial success.

In 2013 he was selected to represent India at the Trans Atlantic Partners (TAP), the intensive training and networking programme for European Canadian and American producers. TAP is supported by the MEDIA Mundus Programme of the European Union, by Telefilm Canada, and VFF (Verwertungsgesellschaft der Film- und Fernsehproduzenten mbH) Germany.

Under the Jungle Book Entertainment banner, Gaurav also produced the critically acclaimed documentary, Faith Connections and the India-New Zealand co-production, Beyond the Known World, starring David Wenham.

Gaurav independently produced, financed and distributed India's first female buddy film Angry Indian Goddesses directed by Pan Nalin.

In 2017, Gaurav produced The Known World directed by Pan Nalin, starring Australian star David Wenham and French star Emmanuelle Beart, which was released in Australia and New Zealand in 2017 to unanimous critical appreciation. He also served as the Line Producer for The Amazing Race for multiple seasons across different adaptations and for World's Toughest Trucker.

Gaurav’s latest release, Stolen (2023), features Abhishek Banerjee in the lead role. Pre-production began in 2019 but was temporarily halted due to the COVID-19 pandemic. Despite the setback, the film made a powerful comeback, premiering to global critical acclaim at the 2023 Venice and Zurich Film Festivals. It is now streaming worldwide on Amazon Prime Video, where it continues to receive widespread praise. Also, after the release, the film was appreciated by the Khiladi himself, Akshay Kumar, who praised Abhishek Banerjee's performance. The film was also backed by Anurag Kashyap, Kiran Rao, Nikkhil Advani & Vikramaditya Motwane as they joined as Executive Producers.

In the television sphere, Gaurav has been associated with 15-time Emmy Award-winning reality show, the Amazing Race for over a decade as well as Producing top international reality shows, Ice Road Truckers: Deadliest Roads (Season 1) for History Channel and World's Toughest Truckers (India Episode) for Discovery & Channel 5. Gaurav also joined hands with Patrick Costello, the Showrunner of Rennervations to help the production efforts and hire a local crew for the particular episode that was shot in Rajasthan. The production crew behind the India shoot included over 200 local Indian crew members who were on the ground in the thick of making the episode so special. This commitment to authenticity in production adds to the overall value of the show.

== Filmography ==
Year	Film	Contribution	Notes
2012	Peddlers	Co-Producer	(Nominee) Golden Camera - Festival de Cannes (Nominee) Critics Week Grand Prize - Festival de Cannes
2013	Faith Connections	Producer	Audience Award - Los Angeles Indian Film Festival Official Selection - Toronto International Film Festival
2013	Vakratunda Mahakaya	Co-Producer	Official Selection - Melbourne International Film Festival
2015	Angry Indian Goddesses	Co-Producer	Runner-Up - Toronto International Film Festival People's Choice Award Winner - Audience Award Rome Film Festival Official Selection - Helsinki Film Festival
2015	Haraamkhor	Co-Producer	Official Selection - New York Indian Film Festival (NYIFF) Indian Film Festival of Los Angeles (IFFLA)
2017	Beyond the Known World	Producer	Official Selection - Gold Coast Film Festival
2023	Stolen	Writer and Producer	Official Selection - 80th Venice International Film Festival

== Credits ==
=== Television ===
- The Amazing Race US (2001–Present) TV Series (Line Producer - Multiple Seasons)
- The Amazing Race Asia (2006–Present) TV Series (Line Producer - Seasons 1, 3 & 5)
- The Amazing Race Australia (2011–Present) TV Series (Line Producer - Season 1)
- The Amazing Race Norway (2012–Present) TV Series (Line Producer - Season 1)
- The Amazing Race Israel (2009–Present) TV Series (Line Producer - Season 5)
- The Amazing Race China (2014–Present) TV Series (Line Producer - Season 1)
- World's Toughest Trucker (2012) Reality TV Series (Line Producer - Season 1)
- Ice Road Truckers: Deadliest Roads (2010) TV series (Line Producer - Season 1)
- Survivor (2010) TV Series (Line Producer - Season 7 and 8)
- Rennervations (2023) TV Series (Line Producer - Season 1)

=== Feature films ===
- For Real (2009) (Line Producer)
- Delhi-6 (2009) (Line Producer)
- Mere Khwabon Mein Jo Aaye (2009) (Line Producer)
- The 19th Step (Feature Film) (2008) (Line Producer)
- Valley of Flowers (2006) (Production Manager)
- Rang De Basanti (2006) (Production Manager)
- Mangal Pandey: The Rising (2005) (Production Manager)
- American Daylight (2004) (Production Manager)
- Maqbool (2003) (Production Manager)
