= Kamakhya (disambiguation) =

Kamakhya is a Hindu goddess.

Kamakhya may also refer to:

- Kamakhya Temple, dedicated to the goddess.
- Kamakhya, Guwahati, Assam, India, which contains the temple.
- Kamakhya Junction, a station in that neighborhood.
- Kamakhya–Howrah Vande Bharat Sleeper Express, connecting this station to Howrah.
- Kamakhya–Charlapalli Amrit Bharat Express, connecting this station to Hydrabad.
- Kamakhya, A Socio-Cultural Study, a book by Nihar Ranjan Mishra

== People ==
- Kamakhya Narain Singh (1916–1970), an Indian politician and Maharaja Bahadur of Ramgarh Raj
- Kamakhya Narayan Singh (born 1984), an Indian film director and writer
- Kamakhya Prasad Singh Deo (born 1941), an Indian politician
- Kamakhya Prasad Tasa (born 1975), an Indian politician
