= Jungle Book Studio =

Indian film production company

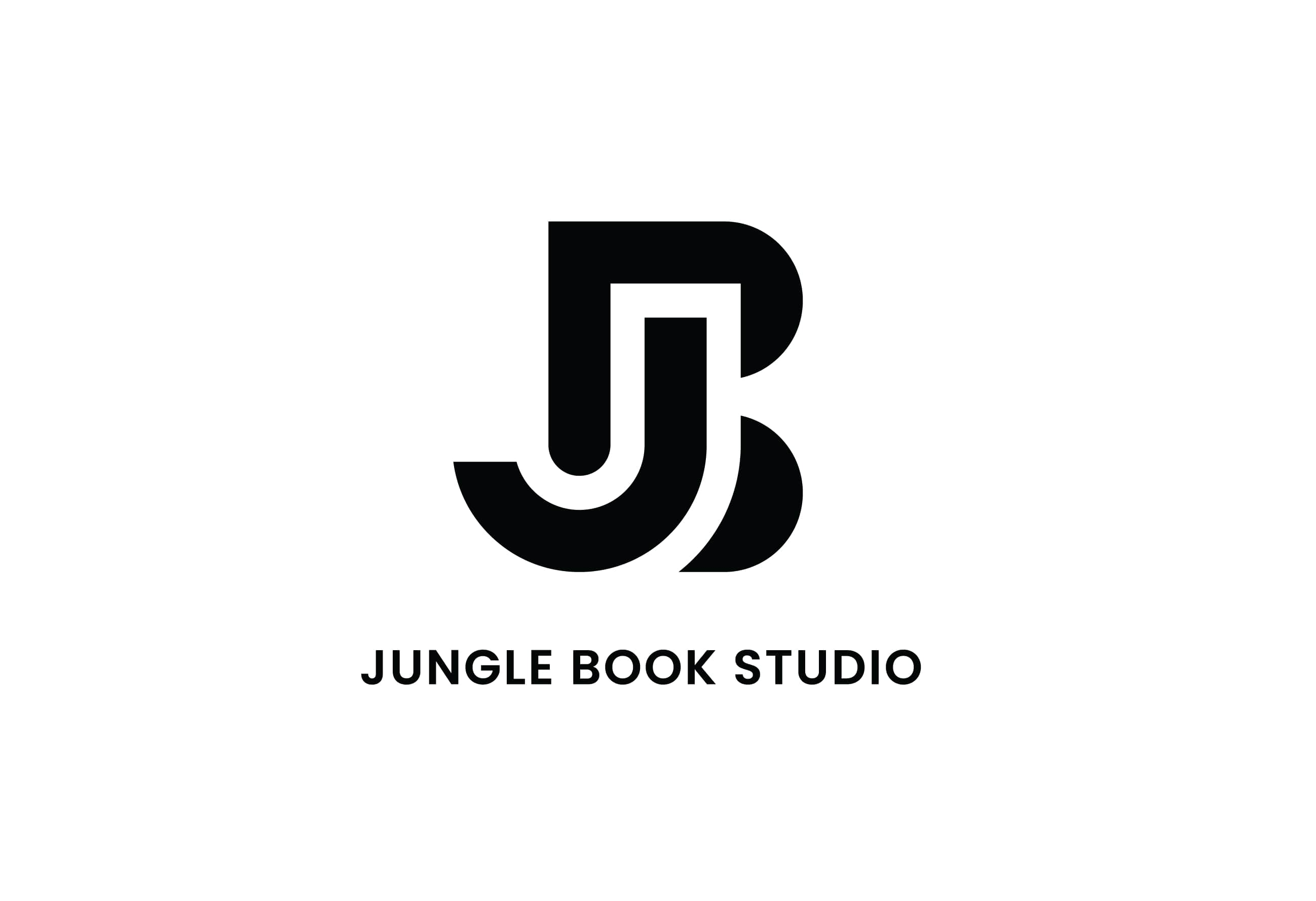
- Type: Private Limited Company
- Industry: International Film and Television Production
- Founded: 2012
- Headquarters: Mumbai, Maharashtra, India
- Key people: Gaurav Dhingra (founder)
- Products: Motion Pictures, Television & OTT Drama Series, Documentary, Production Services
- Website: www.junglebook.studio

Jungle Book Studio ( formerly known as Jungle Book Entertainment ) is an International film and television production company, founded by Gaurav Dhingra and Pan Nalin, who met during the making of Valley of Flowers, in 2005. In November 2012, Gaurav & Nalin decided to collaborate with an objective to produce Globally resonating Indian stories. Jungle Book has since teamed up with eminent international production companies for several of its productions, namely Angry Indian Goddesses, touted as India's first female buddy film, Faith Connections, a documentary that won the Audience Choice Award at IFFLA, and Beyond the Known World, the first official India-New Zealand co-production.

Post 2018, Pan Nalin left the company, and it is now solely run by Gaurav. The company also changed its name from Jungle Book Entertainment to Jungle Book Studio and shifted to a mini-studio model.

== Productions ==
In 2013, Jungle Book Studio produced Faith Connections, a documentary set in the largest human gathering in the world, the Kumbh Mela. French sales company Cite Films came on board as Co producer. During filming, the hordes of attendees at the event made filming logistics challenging, with filming continuing non-stop for seventy two hours, at times. Faith Connections went on to premiere in the Official Selection Category at the Toronto International Film Festival and was picked up by indie distributors NFP for distribution in Germany and Sophie Dulac Distribution for distribution in France, before getting theatrical releases in more than 28 countries across the world.

In 2015, Jungle Book produced Angry Indian Goddesses. The cast was finalised after auditions from over 800 candidates. As Nalin wanted the character briefs to be inspired from the experiences of women in real-life, the cast was encouraged to heavily influence the storyline by ad-libbing dialogues and improvising scenes. It had its world premiere at TIFF and was declared the runner-up of the Grolsch People's Choice Award. It was picked up for a theatrical release spanning over 67 countries and dozens of film festivals globally before being acquired for online distribution by Netflix worldwide. During post production, German producer Sol Bondy of One Two Films came on board as a co producer. Subsequently, in late 2015, Protein Entertainment financed the marketing of the India release of the film.

In 2017, next on the cards for Jungle Book was the feature film Beyond the Known World, which was co-produced with New Zealand Production Company Reservoir Films. Gaurav mounted the first ever Indo-New Zealand co-production with kiwi producer Matthew Horrocks, which was shot across Delhi, Himachal Pradesh and Ladakh. Beyond the Known World featured a star cast comprising David Wenham (Lord of the Rings, 300, Lion), Emmanuelle Béart (Mission Impossible, Manon des Sources) and Sia Trokenheim. It went on to screen at film festivals across New Zealand and premiered to good reviews from critics.

== Filmography ==
Year	Film	Cast	Notes
2025	Stolen	Abhishek Banerjee, Shubham, Mia Mealzer, Harish Khanna, Shahidur Rahaman	Official Selection – 80th Venice International Film Festival
2017	Beyond the Known World	David Wenham, Emmanuelle Béart, Sia Trokenheim	Official Selection – Gold Coast Film Festival
2015	Angry Indian Goddesses	Sarah-Jane Dias, Sandhya Mridul, Anushka Manchanda, Rajshri Deshpande, Tannishtha Chatterjee, Amrit Maghera, Pavleen Gujral	Runner-Up – Toronto International Film Festival People's Choice Award; Winner – Audience Award Rome Film Festival; Official Selection – Helsinki Film Festival
2013	Faith Connections	Hatha Yogi Baba, Pant Shirt Baba, Baba Bajrangi	Audience Award – Los Angeles Indian Film Festival; Official Selection – Toronto International Film Festival
