= Charak: Fair of Faith =

2026 Hindi-language film

- Theatrical release poster
- Directed by: Shieladitya Moulik
- Written by: Farauq Malik
- Produced by: Sudipto Sen
- Starring: Anjali Patil; Sahidur Rahaman; Subrat Dutta; Shashi Bhushan; Nalneesh Neel
- Cinematography: Manas Bhattacharyya; Prashantanu Mahapatra
- Edited by: Praveen Angre
- Music by: Bishakh Jyoti
- Production companies: Pen Studios; Sipping Tea Cinemas; Sudipto Sen Productions
- Distributed by: Pen Marudhar
- Release date: 6 March 2026
- Running time: 120 minutes
- Country: India
- Language: Hindi

Charak: Fair of Faith is a 2026 Indian Hindi-language thriller film directed by Shieladitya Moulik and produced by Sudipto Sen. The film was released on 6 March 2026. It is produced under the banners Sipping Tea Cinemas and Sudipto Sen Productions.

== Plot ==
The film is set in a remote village in eastern India during the annual Charak Mela, a traditional festival associated with the worship of Hindu deities Shiva and Kali. The narrative unfolds amid ritual practices and acts of religious penance that form part of the local cultural landscape.

During the festival, two schoolchildren, Birsa and Kanu, go missing. Several days later, Kanu's body is found in a pond, while Birsa remains missing. The incident causes distress within the village and prompts a police investigation.

The story focuses on Sukumar, an autorickshaw driver who is childless and deeply religious. As the search for the missing child continues, Sukumar's personal beliefs and motivations become central to the unfolding events. The film explores themes related to faith, social relationships, and moral conflict within a rural setting.

== Cast ==
- Anjali Patil as Shefali
- Sahidur Rahaman as Police Officer Subhash
- Subrat Dutta as Manoranjan
- Shashi Bhushan as Sukumar
- Nalneesh Neel as Jagan
- Sankhadeep Banerjee as Birsa
- Shounak Shyamal as Kanu
- Debasish Mondal as Aghori Bhima

== Reception ==
The Times of India rated 3.5/5 and commented that a compelling story, backed by effective twists, keeps the tension alive till the end.

Sana Farzeen of India Today rated 3/5 and reviewed that the film explores devotion that often blurs humanity.

Amit Bhatia of ABP News gave 1 stars out of 5 and said that "Charak: Fair of Faith feels like a pirated copy of a duplicate Kantara and ultimately disappoints by failing to explore the Charak festival as promised." Shruti Sampat of Mid-Day writes that "It may not be an easy watch, but the film succeeds in delivering a thought-provoking and chilling look at the dangers of blind belief."

== Music ==
The electrifying background score has been composed by Bishakh Jyoti. The first song title, Ghor Aghor, was penned by Anant and sung by Bishakh Jyoti & Kinjal Chatterjee. The lyrics of the second title, Jogi Mera Sach, was written by Amarnath Jha and sung by the notable Shankar Mahadevan. The music rights were acquired by Times Music.

== Controversy ==
The film initially faced trouble from the Central Board of Film Certification (CBFC) due to its explosive and expositive story telling. It was referred to a higher reviewing committee. After three screenings, the august committee gave the film an A certificate with minor cuts.
