= Angry Indian Goddesses =

2015 Indian Hindi-language drama film

- Film poster
- Directed by: Pan Nalin
- Written by: Pan Nalin, Subhadra Mahajan, Arsala Qureishi
- Screenplay by: Pan Nalin
- Story by: Pan Nalin
- Produced by: Gaurav Dhingra; Pan Nalin
- Starring: Sandhya Mridul; Tannishtha Chatterjee; Sarah-Jane Dias; Anushka Manchanda; Amrit Maghera; Rajshri Deshpande
- Cinematography: Swapnil S. Sonawane
- Edited by: Shreyas Beltangdy
- Release dates: 18 September 2015 (TIFF); 27 November 2015 (India)
- Running time: 115 minutes
- Country: India
- Language: Hindi

Angry Indian Goddesses is a 2015 Indian Hindi-language drama film directed by Pan Nalin and produced by Gaurav Dhingra and Pan Nalin under the banner of Jungle Book Studio. It stars Sandhya Mridul, Tannishtha Chatterjee, Sarah-Jane Dias, Anushka Manchanda, Amrit Maghera, Rajshri Deshpande, and Pavleen Gujral with Adil Hussain. It was screened in the Special Presentations section of the 2015 Toronto International Film Festival, where it finished second for the People's Choice Award.

== Plot ==
Freida is a fashion photographer who invites a group of friends to her family's home to announce her wedding. The group, from all over India, consists of Madhurita or Mad, a Bollywood singer, Pamela Jaswal or Pammy, a trophy wife, Suranjana or Su, a businesswoman, and Joanna or Jo, an aspiring actress. Nargis, an activist, later joins the party. The announcement sets off a chain of reactions, letting out hidden secrets from all of the women. Freida explains that her father will not join her for the wedding, and Mad's boyfriend, who comes looking for her, explains that she is depressed and suicidal. After the announcement, the women descend upon Goa. Thus begins an impromptu bachelorette party, and they begin to bond.

Everything's set for a night of celebration. There's only one issue: Frieda won't say who her fiancé is. As they banter their way through celebration, their conversation, derived entirely from improvisations among the actors, covers everything from sex to street harassment to the buff (and often shirtless) next-door neighbour.

During the trip, the women are harassed and confront their harassers, who become angry and frightened. As the holiday progresses, the women share their dreams, desires and fears, and their relationships with one another develop.

Later, the women learn that Freida will marry Nargis (which was illegal under the IPC section 377 until 6 September 2018). On the eve of the wedding, the group decides to have a picnic on the beach. At the picnic, a heated argument between Jo and the rest of the group regarding her accent leads Jo to walk out, but the party continues till late into the night. When they decide to go home, they look for Jo. She is found dead on the beach, apparently raped. The doctor, who arrives in the ambulance, refuses to treat her before the police come as she is already dead. The police arrive shortly and the police officer in charge conducts his preliminary inquiries in a manner that shames the women, reiterating their lack of faith in a patriarchal society that treats women shabbily. They return home, distraught and frustrated.

Su's daughter Maya had followed Jo when she left the party and took photos of her. The pictures reveal that it was the group of six men who had harassed the friends earlier that gang raped and killed Jo. Su heads back to the beach with a gun. The rest of the group chases after her. Su shoots 4 of the rapists before Nargis stops her. Mad takes the gun and kills the other two.

At Jo's funeral, the group makes a series of sentimental speeches, Nargis' speech summarizing the worth of a woman and hopes that in the next lives of women, they will be able to write their own stories. The police officer interrupts the ceremony, asking for a confession of guilt from the women and wanting them to stand up. The story has an open-ended conclusion, with the entire congregation in the church standing up in solidarity with the women.

== Cast ==
- Sarah-Jane Dias as Freida De Silva, a fashion photographer and the bride
- Tannishtha Chatterjee as Nargis Nasreen, a revolutionary who is adversaries with Su
- Anushka Manchanda as Madhurita aka "Mad", a Bollywood singer and friend of Freida
- Sandhya Mridul as Suranjana aka "Su", a businesswoman and mother of 6-year-old Maya
- Amrit Maghera as Joanna Mendes aka "Jo", an aspiring actress and cousin of Freida
- Rajshri Deshpande as Lakshmi, Freida's maid
- Pavleen Gujral as Pamela Jaiswal aka "Pammy", a gold medalist turned housewife
- Arjun Mathur as Zain, Madhurita's boyfriend
- Adil Hussain as a Goa Police Superintendent
- Jeffrey Goldberg as Chris
- Vikram Kochhar as an agent
- Anuj Choudhary as the neighbour
- Rajesh Karekar as Tony
- Dr. Swapnil Salkar as the doctor
- Kkunal Shinde as a voice over artist

== Soundtrack ==
The film's music was composed by Cyril Morin and produced by Super Cassettes Industries Limited. Song lyrics were written by Raman Negi, Anushka Manchanda, and Dr. Swapnil Salkar.

No.	Title	Music	Singers(s)	Length
1.	"Dil Dola Re"	Pratichee Mohapatra	Pratichee Mohapatra	3:28
2.	"Aaoge Tum Kabhi"	The Local Train	Raman Negi	5:13
3.	"Zindagi"	Anushka Manchanda	Anushka Manchanda	4:20
4.	"Tinko Ke Sahare"	Kary Arora	Kary Arora	3:47
5.	"Dil Dola Re (Remix)"	Pratichee Mohapatra	Pratichee Mohapatra	3:45
Total length:				20:53

== Title sequence ==
The film's opening title sequence was designed by Plexus, a Mumbai-based VFX and animation studio. The title sequence was named by Artofthetitle.com as one of the top ten title sequences of 2015. The studio's founders and motion graphics artists Vijesh Rajan and Yashoda Parthasarthy were also interviewed by the Artofthetitle.com staff about their process for designing the title sequence. The title sequence was asked to be censored and blurred in its entirety by the Central Board of Film Certification (CBFC) for its Indian release.

== Release ==
The film was released in two versions: an international version, and an Indian version. The international version which was screened at the Toronto International Film Festival is not censored and does not have an interval, unlike the Indian version.

== Reception ==
On review aggregator website Rotten Tomatoes, the film has an approval rating of 61% based on 18 critics, with an average rating of 5.9/10.

Namrata Joshi of The Hindu wrote "Pavleen Gujral is a revelation and Sarah-Jane Dias shows admirable poise".

Mohar Basu of The Times of Indiasaid "Alas, the story is never supported by a solid screenplay. The film's pace is a problem and though things gear up in the second half, it ends as a loopy mess".

Sweta Kaushal of Hindustan Times was of a different opinion, she stated "Ultimately, Angry Indian Goddesses is a decent watch as long as the fun lasts but tumbles downhill with gathering pace as the 'anger' kicks in".

In the West the film was poorly received by critics. Variety's Jay Weissberg criticized the director Pan Nalin for "overload[ing] his jaunty wagon with weighty of-the-moment topics that it splinters into dozens of pieces".

Justin Lowe of The Hollywood Reporter was of the same view, he wrote that "[the film's] emphasis on the women's reactions to a variety of discriminatory situations starts to resemble a checklist approach, ticking off situations that cover career challenges, marriage dilemmas and personal relationships".

However, Linda Barnard of the Toronto Star who gave the film a score 2.5 out of 4 stars, called the actresses "Goddesses" who are "crowd pleasers".

Also enjoying the film was Kate Taylor of The Globe and Mail who didn't hesitate to write "It works, partly because the Indian cinema, accustomed to epics encompassing musical, comedy and tragedy, has a sprawling sensibility and partly because the script, for all its sunshine and sentiment, has actually built to its startling conclusion".
