= III Smoking Barrels =

2017 Indian drama film

- Theatrical release poster
- Directed by: Sanjib Dey
- Written by: Sanjib Dey
- Produced by: Amit Malpani
- Starring: Subrat Dutta; Indraneil Sengupta; Siddharth Boro; Shiny Gogoi
- Cinematography: Anil B.Akki
- Edited by: Praveen Kathikuloth, Dattatraya Ghodke
- Music by: Michele Josia, Anurag Saikia
- Production company: Malpani Talkies
- Distributed by: Panorama Studios; SSR Cinemas; Kamakhya Films
- Release dates: 16 July 2017 (Durban International Film Festival); 21 September 2018 (India)
- Running time: 127 minutes
- Country: India
- Languages: English; Hindi; Assamese; Bengali; Meitei; Nagamese

III Smoking Barrels is a 2017 Indian drama film written and directed by Sanjib Dey and produced by Amit Malpani under his banner Malpani Talkies. The film is an anthology of three stories exploring three socio-political issues encompassing Northeast India. The film also seamlessly uses six spoken languages which is considered a unique feat in Indian cinema history.

III Smoking Barrels premiered at the 2017 Durban International Film Festival, followed by its European premiere at the 2017 International Filmfestival Mannheim-Heidelberg where it was screened in the International Competition section. The film premiered in India at the 22nd International Film Festival of Kerala. It won the Silver Palm Award at 2018 Mexico International Film Festival for Best Narrative Feature.

The film was released in India on 21 September 2018. An official trailer of the film was released on 20 August 2018.

== Plot ==
The film is an anthology of three stories from North East India, each exploring a different stage of human life. The first story is about a child, who on escaping from a rebel camp hijacks a car, transpiring in a journey that unravels her plight and probes deep into traumatic issues of children involved in armed conflicts. The next story is about a boy, a drug peddler, and his journey into the drug world. It simultaneously explores the life of his grieving mother while delving into the region that has become synonymous with the drug trade. The third story is about a man, an elephant poacher, who ends up killing fifteen elephants to fend for himself and his young wife. It explores his treacherous life and the murky powers that control this abhorrent business.

== Cast ==
- Subrat Dutta as Mukhtar
- Indraneil Sengupta as Anurag Dutta
- Shiny Gogoi as Janice
- Siddharth Boro as Donnie
- Mandakini Goswami as Neelima
- Amrita Chattopadhyay as Morjina
- Vikram Gogoi as Chiru
- Bijou Thaangjam as Drug Peddler
- Nalneesh Neel as Ikram
- Niloy Shankar Gupta as Dhiren
- Rajni Basumatary as country bar owner

== Production ==
The development of the film started in 2014 when Malpani Talkies came on board to produce the film which is entirely set in Northeast India. The principal photography of the film started in 2014 and ended in November 2015. During these two years all the three stories in the film were mainly filmed near the international borders of India-Bhutan, India-Bangladesh, India- Myanmar and at the famous Manas National Park in Assam and in the city of Guwahati.

== Soundtrack ==
The background score of the film have been composed by Italian composer Michele Josia in collaboration with Indian composer Anurag Saikia. The soundtrack consists eight songs composed by various composers and sung by Papon Angarag Mahanta, Kartik Das Baul, Isheeta Chakrvarthy, Nangsan Lyngwa and Gregory Sharma. The songs were released by Times Music. The first song "Yeh Tishnagi" in Hindi language was released on 29 August 2018. Same day an Assamese version of the same song titled "Uttorbihin" was also released. The entire album of eight songs were released on 2 September 2018. The album comprises various genres from rock to Baul to Borgeet to Death Metal and in four different languages viz. Hindi, English, Bengali and Assamese.

== Festivals and special screening ==
III Smoking Barrels was officially selected for screening at different International Film Festivals across the globe.

- Durban International Film Festival 2017 South Africa
- International Film Festival Mannheim Heildelberg 2017 ( International Competition), Germany
- International Film Festival of Kerala 2017 (Indian Cinema Now)
- Mexico International Film Festival 2018
- Love is Folly International Film Festival 2018 (Youth Cinema), Bulgaria
- Jagran Film Festival 2018 (In Competition)
- Indian Film Festival Bhubaneshwar 2018

On 14 March 2018, a special screening of the film was held at the SFX cinema in Chiang Mai, Bangkok, with the support of Indian Consulate of Chiang Mai under its cultural exchange program. The screening was attended by Consulate Generals and Consuls of various countries like Japan, China, USA, Portugal, Austria etc. Among other dignitaries was famous Indian film director Kabir Khan.

== Awards and nominations ==
Award	Category	Recipient(s) & Nominee(s)	Result
International Filmfestival of Mannheim-Heidelberg 2017	Grand Newcomer Award	Sanjib Dey	Nominated
International Filmfestival of Mannheim-Heidelberg 2017	Audience Choice Award	Amiit Malpani	Nominated
Mexico International Film Festival 2018	Silver Palm Award (Best Narrative Feature)	Sanjib Dey	Won
Love is Folly International Film Festival 2018, Varna	Young Jury Award	Sanjib Dey	Nominated
Prag Cine Awards 2018	Best Film (Other language)	Amit Malpani & Sanjib Dey	Won
Prag Cine Awards 2018	Best Music	Michele Josia & Anurag Saikia	Won
Prag Cine Awards 2018	Best Make up	Shrirup Das	Won
Prag Cine Awards 2018	Best Cinematography	Anil B. Akki	Nominated
Prag Cine Awards 2018	Best Singer (Female)	Isheeta Chakrvarthy	Nominated
Prag Cine Awards 2018	Best Costume	Sukalpa Das & Tanushree Baruah	Nominated
Prag Cine Awards 2018	Best Sound Designing	Devobrat Chaliha	Nominated
Prag Cine Awards 2018	Best Art Direction	Photik Baruah & Bijou Thaangjam	Nominated
7th Assam State Film Award And Festival	Phunu Barua Award for Best Film in other Language	Amit Malpani	Won
7th Assam State Film Award And Festival	Iva Achao Award for Best Supporting Actress Female	Mandakini Goswami	Won
7th Assam State Film Award And Festival	Dr. Bhabendranath Saikia Award for Best Screenplay	Sanjib Dey	Nominated
