= Sudipto Sen =

Indian film director, producer and screenwriter (born 1972)

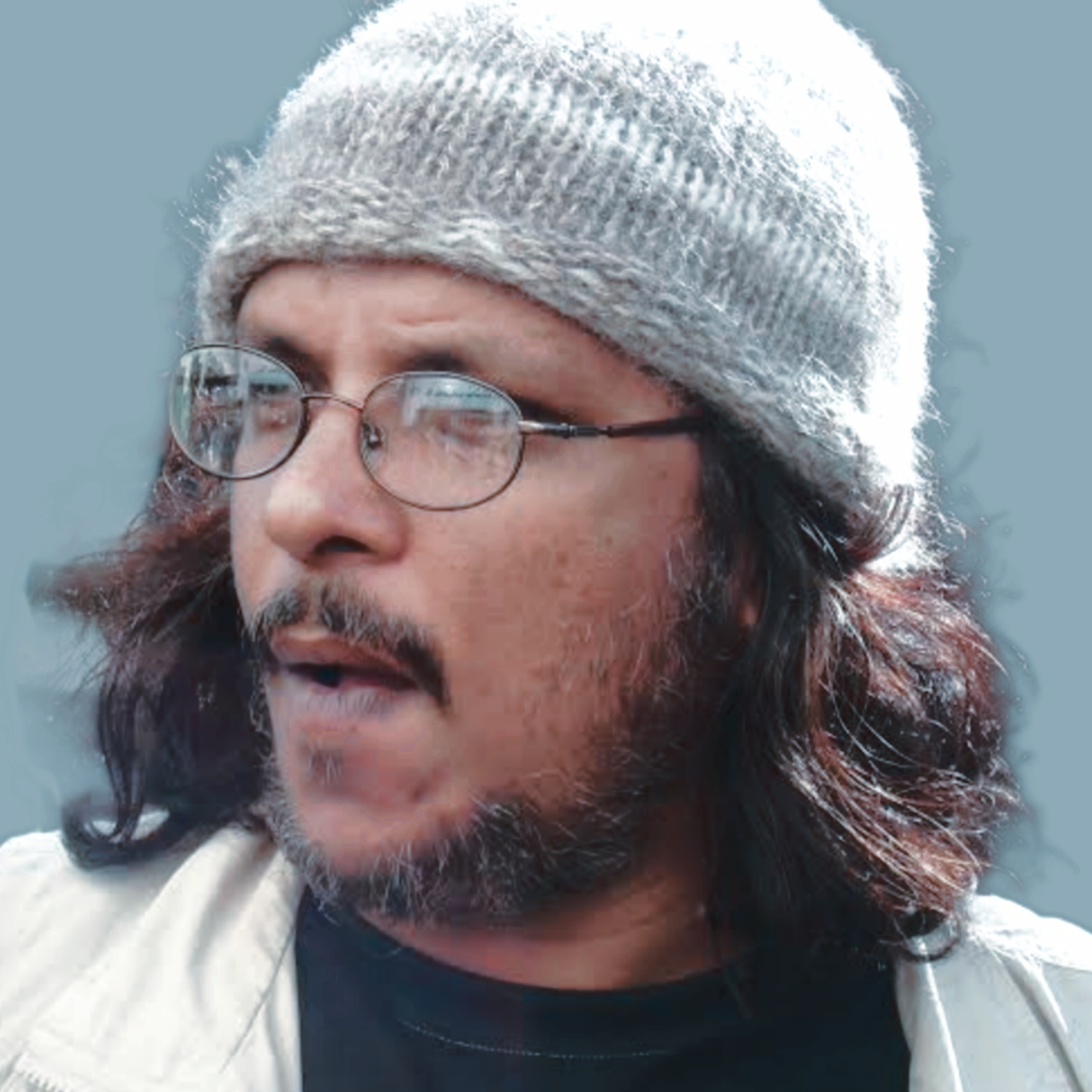
- Born: 16 January 1972 (age 54); Siliguri, West Bengal, India
- Education: University of Calcutta
- Occupations: Film director; producer; screenwriter
- Years active: 1990s–present

Sudipto Sen is an Indian film director, producer and screenwriter known for his work in Hindi cinema. He has directed various feature films such as The Last Monk (2006), Lucknow Times (2015), The Kerala Story (2023), and Bastar: The Naxal Story (2024). Sen also established Sipping Tea Cinemas, which serves as the production banner for many of his films.

Sen received the National Film Award for Best Direction for The Kerala Story.

== Early life and education ==
Sudipto Sen was born in a Sen family in Siliguri, West Bengal. He has a bachelor's in physics and a master's in applied psychology from University of Calcutta.

== Career ==
=== Early work ===
Sen began his career directing documentaries in the late 1990s. His early work includes The Other Wealth (1997), described as an experimental short documentary. During this period, he also produced several development-focused films, reportedly collaborating with institutions like the World Bank.

=== Feature films ===
Sen made his feature film debut with The Last Monk (2006), which was screened at international festivals such as Cannes, Rotterdam, Raindance, and Singapore. This was followed by Akhnoor (2007), an Indo-French co-production that received awards at Brussels, and San Francisco.

His later feature works include Gurujana (2022), a biographical film on 15th-century Assamese philosopher Srimanta Sankardeva, which was officially selected for the Indian Panorama section at the International Film Festival of India (IFFI).

In 2023, Sen directed The Kerala Story, a film based on alleged cases of religious conversion and terrorism. It generated widespread public debate and commercial success, reportedly grossing over ₹242 crore domestically—making it one of the highest-grossing Hindi films of the year. The film also received criticism for its screenplay, cast performances, its failure to maintain factual accuracy and was characterised as an propaganda film.

In 2024, he released Bastar: The Naxal Story, which dealt with the Maoist insurgency in Chhattisgarh and received attention for its depiction of internal conflict in India.

== Filmography ==
=== As director ===
Short films

Year	Title	Notes
1997	The Other Wealth	Short documentary

Documentary films

Year	Title	Notes
2018	Guru Ji: Ahead of Time	45-minute documentary on the sculptor Ravindra Sharma.
2021	In the Name of Love	Precursor documentary to The Kerala Story.

Feature films

Year	Title	Notes
2006	The Last Monk	
2007	Akhnoor	
2011	Amrit Kumbh	
2015	Lucknow Times	
2022	Gurujana	
2023	The Kerala Story	
2025	Aasma	
2024	Bastar: The Naxal Story	
TBA	Saharasri	

=== As producer ===
Year	Title	Notes
2026	Charak: Fair of Faith	Directed by Shieladitya Moulik; co-produced with Dhaval Jayantilal Gada.

=== Projects in development ===
- Chandni Bar 2
- Basera
- The Eighth Note, a biopic of the Carnatic singer M. S. Subbulakshmi

== Jury member ==
- International Art Culture and Cinema Festival (IACCF) 2021
- IFFI 2022

== Awards ==
Year	Award	Category	Work	Result	Ref
2025	National Film Award	Best Director	The Kerala Story	Won	

== See also ==
- List of Indian film directors
