= The Kerala Story 2 =

2026 Indian film by Kamakhya Narayan Singh

The Kerala Story 2: Goes Beyond
- Theatrical release poster
- Directed by: Kamakhya Narayan Singh
- Written by: Vipul Amrutlal Shah; Amarnath Jha
- Produced by: Vipul Amrutlal Shah
- Starring: Ulka Gupta; Aishwarya Ojha; Aditi Bhatia
- Cinematography: Abhijeet Chaudhari
- Edited by: Sanjay Sharma
- Music by: Score: Mannan Shaah; Songs: Mannan Shaah; Rahul Suhas
- Production company: Sunshine Pictures
- Distributed by: Sunshine Pictures
- Release date: 27 February 2026
- Running time: 131 minutes
- Country: India
- Language: Hindi
- Budget: ₹30 crore
- Box office: est. ₹48.98 crore

The Kerala Story 2: Goes Beyond is a 2026 Indian Hindi-language drama film directed by Kamakhya Narayan Singh and produced by Vipul Amrutlal Shah through Sunshine Pictures. A sequel to the 2023 film The Kerala Story, it stars Ulka Gupta, Aditi Bhatia and Aishwarya Ojha as three women who become victims of an abusive plot after marrying outside their religion.

Having generated legal and political debate following the release of its teaser and trailer, the film was released theatrically on 27 February 2026 and received mixed-to-negative reviews from critics.

== Premise ==
The film expands the narrative of its predecessor and follows the lives of several young women across different Indian states. The story explores themes related to personal relationships, alleged religious conversion, and societal pressures.

== Cast ==
- Ulka Gupta as Surekha Nair
- Aditi Bhatia as Divya Paliwal
- Aishwarya Ojha as Neha Sant
- Sumit Gahlawat as Salim
- Arjan Singh Aujla as Faizan
- Yuktam Kholsa as Rasheed
- Alka Amin as Hafsa Begum

== Soundtrack ==
The Kerala Story 2 Goes Beyond

Soundtrack album by Mannan Shaah & Rahul Suhas
- Released: 13 February 2026
- Genre: Feature film soundtrack
- Length: 19:30
- Language: Hindi
- Label: Sunshine Music
- Producer: Mannan Shaah
External audio
- Official Audio Jukebox on YouTube

The music is composed by Mannan Shaah and Rahul Suhas.

The first song "Saathi Re" was released on 4 February 2026 sang by Vishal Mishra.

Track listing
No.	Title	Lyrics	Music	Singer(s)	Length
1.	"Saathi Re"	Manoj Muntashir	Mannan Shaah	Vishal Mishra	3:23
2.	"O Maayi Ri"	Manoj Muntashir	Mannan Shaah	Shreya Ghoshal	4:31
3.	"Shiv Shambho"	Manoj Muntashir	Mannan Shaah	Mannan Shaah	5:10
4.	"Kanha"	Manoj Muntashir	Rahul Suhas	Palak Muchhal, Rahul Suhas	3:35
5.	"Thaari Jogan"	Sahil Sultanpuri	Mannan Shaah	Shaoni Mojumdar	2:51
Total length:					19:30

== Release ==
=== Theatrical ===
After receiving a UA16+ certificate on 16 February 2026, the film was scheduled for a theatrical release in India on 27 February 2026, before the Kerala High Court granted an interim stay on the film's release.

On 25 February 2026, the Kerala High Court directed the makers to halt the release of the film's rights until it decided on "probably genuine" petitions challenging its censor board certification, and further noting that the makers were not keen on screening the film immediately, observed that there was a shortage of time to examine the matter in detail.

On 26 February 2026, The Kerala High Court granted an interim stay on the film's release, observing that the CBFC appeared to have not followed the guidelines meant to ensure a film does not disrupt social harmony.

However, after the producers swiftly moved an appeal against the order on the same day, responding to the urgency of the matter, the Kerala High Court Division Bench convened a special sitting, and on 27 February 2026 lifted the interim stay on the release of the film, with a 2-judge bench setting aside the earlier order by a single-judge bench.

=== Home media ===
The film began streaming on ZEE5 from 1 May 2026.

== Controversy ==
The film became the subject of legal and political debate in India following the release of the official teaser and trailer. In February 2026, a petitioner named Sreedev Namboodiri filed a writ petition before the Kerala High Court challenging the certification granted to the film by the Central Board of Film Certification. The petition argued that the film’s promotional material including its title and depiction of themes such as terrorism and alleged forced conversions could create a misleading regional association with the state of Kerala and disturb public order and communal harmony. The High Court issued notices to the producers, the CBFC, and the Union Ministry of Information and Broadcasting, and scheduled further hearings on the matter.

Several public figures and organisations also commented on the film. Pinarayi Vijayan, Chief Minister of Kerala, described the sequel as potentially promoting divisive narratives and called for careful consideration of its impact on communal harmony. Other political commentators, including senior leader Shashi Tharoor, also criticised the film’s messaging in public statements, prompting responses from both supporters and opponents of the project. The film was granted a U/A certificate by the Central Board of Film Certification, which drew further public discussion regarding the suitability of its themes for younger audiences. The British Board of Film Classification, while granting the film an 18 classification for its portrayal of sexual violence and domestic abuse, noted that it presented a "partial and unbalanced view of Islam which focuses on Islamist characters with a radical agenda to the exclusion of more moderate and mainstream forms of the faith."

The Communist Party of India (Kerala state unit) reportedly passed a resolution opposing the film and urged reconsideration of its certification, alleging that it could create communal tension. Union minister Giriraj Singh publicly defended the film, stating that filmmakers have the right to present their perspective.

Political reactions were also reported outside Kerala. In Bihar, politician Pappu Yadav criticised the debate surrounding the film and questioned whether political parties should influence filmmaking decisions. The film’s trailer also generated extensive discussion on social media platforms, with commentators debating whether it presents factual events or promotes a particular narrative.

On 25 February 2026, The Kerala High Court directed the filmmakers to screen the film for the court. In response, the producer Vipul Amrutlal Shah opposed the order, citing that "the court must not exercise its authority to view and evaluate films".

== Reception ==
The film received mixed-to-negative reviews from critics.

Amit Bhatia from ABP News gave the film 2.5 stars out of 5 and praised the performances, while terming it a serviceable but uneven sequel with weaker production values, overstretched and exaggerated sequences. Satish Sundaresan from The Free Press Journal also gave it 2.5 stars out of 5 and praised the performances, direction, cinematography and editing, while finding the first half slow. Divya Nair from Rediff.com similarly gave it 2.5 stars out of 5 and praised the performances, but found them ultimately diluted by a heavy-handed, obvious propaganda, and felt that the film seemed intent on stirring hostility against one group. Rishabh Suri from Hindustan Times gave the film 2 stars out of 5, finding it "less a nuanced narrative and more a shouting match, engineered to sensationalise." Vinamra Mathur of Firstpost also gave the film 2 stars out of 5 stars, labelling it an underwhelming drama that relied more on cacophony than coherence. Abhishek Srivastava from Times of India gave the film 1.5 stars out of 5, finding it weak, predictable, dependent more on heavy scenes and speeches than on a strong plot, and comparing it unfavorably to the first film. Saibal Chatterjee from NDTV gave the film 1 star out of 5, accusing the makers of chasing short-term gains by weaponising "the anguish of women wronged not as a tool of empowerment but (in the guise of a cautionary tale) as a means of painting a community into a corner." Sajin Shrijith from The Week similarly gave the film 1 star out of 5, criticising its bias against Muslims, and claiming it was made for "WhatsApp uncles" who believed that all Muslims were as bad as the evil men presented in the film, while also praising Aishwarya Ojha's performance. Arpita Sarkar from OTT Play also gave the film 1 star out of 5, and while finding it visually more elegant than the first film in terms of production values and cinematography, felt that it turned complex social issues into one-dimensional narratives, flattened its female protagonists, and portrayed all antagonists in extremes. Vineeta Kumar from India Today gave the film 0.5 stars out of 5, claiming that it portrayed Muslim men, households and localities negatively, and noting that it did not merely continue its predecessor's argument, but amplified it.

Anuj Kumar from The Hindu found it better performed than the original, but accused Singh of prioritising manipulation and polarisation over plot and dialogue in a "strident" sequel. Nandini Ramnath from Scroll.in stated that the film lived up to its title and went far beyond its predecessor, and released during the holy month of Ramzan after a legal battle, it clearly stated its agenda to portray an entire community as unfeeling villains, whose only goal is to expand their flock by any means possible, and to rouse negative feelings against them. Princy Alexander from Onmanorama found the performances better than the first film, but felt the film appeared less invested in probing a social issue than in reiterating a fixed viewpoint, and by framing crimes such as coercion, exploitation, and violence under the guise of marriage as the defining attribute of a single community, left little room for complexity or dissenting realities. Shruti Sampat from Mid-Day found the performances sincere, but deemed it less a cinematic experience and more "a polemic wrapped in dramatic packaging" that may resonate strongly with viewers who aligned with its viewpoint, but struggled as a piece of storytelling.
