= Haider (soundtrack) =

2014 soundtrack album by Vishal Bhardwaj

Soundtrack album by Vishal Bhardwaj
- Released: 12 September 2014
- Recorded: 2013–14; Studio Satya, Mumbai; The Pierce Rooms, London; Abbey Road Studios, London; Luminous Sound, Dallas, Texas
- Genre: Film soundtrack
- Length: 40:56
- Languages: Hindi, Kashmiri, Urdu
- Label: Junglee Music
- Producers: Ketan Sodha; Vishal Bhardwaj

Vishal Bhardwaj chronology
Dedh Ishqiya (2014)	Haider (2014)	Drishyam (2015)

Singles from Haider
- 1. "Aao Na" Released: 13 August 2014; 2. "Bismil" Released: 24 August 2014; 3. "Khul Kabhi" Released: 6 September 2014

Haider is the soundtrack album, composed by Vishal Bhardwaj, to the 2014 Hindi film of the same name. The film, directed by Vishal Bhardwaj, stars Shahid Kapoor, Shraddha Kapoor, Tabu and Kay Kay Menon in key roles. The soundtrack album features nine tracks, and was released on 12 September 2014 on the record label Junglee Music. Vishal Bhardwaj and Sukhwinder Singh won the National Award for Best Music Direction of Songs and Best Male Playback Singer respectively.

== Development ==
The original songs and film score are composed by Vishal Bhardwaj. The song, "Roshe Valle" was sung live at the shooting spot by actress Tabu as it was a part of her act. Actor Sumit Kaul helped actress Tabu get the right enunciations when she sang the folk song. The track's studio recording was completed in August 2014. Shraddha Kapoor has sung the Kashmiri folk part of the song titled "Do Jahaan". The first single "Aao Na" is a composition that dominates electric guitar instrument with the drum kit providing background beats with upbeat rock elements. The track is a narration of protagonist who breaks his own shallows and sets out in Kashmiri valleys for seeking revenge. The track was called "musically energetic, visually it's vengeful" with composer Vishal Daldani's voice tones ranging from mild to vociferous.Firstpost called the second single "Bismil" as lyricist Gulzar's richly embellished lyrical work with tantalising symbols and innuendo that reflect the story of Haider. According to Bhardwaj, Bismil was the toughest song to compose for the album. It took over four months to compose. He recorded it in Srinagar, Mumbai and London, but wasn't satisfied to a great extent. In Summer 2014, first attempt was made to record the track was at Bhardwaj's music studio in Andheri. He called the track as 'The Mousetrap' (the play within the play) of Hamlet. The song is placed in the film when Haider re-enacts the murder but Bhardwaj chose to portray the situation retaining the poetic flavour. The track marks the point at which Haider (played by Shahid Kapoor) transforms from being conflicted and undecided to being committed to the idea of avenging the injustice meted out to his father. At the crux, Hamlet is a young prince grappling with the knowledge that his uncle and mother have conspired to kill his father. The song was made different from the regular song-and-dance routine, thus the choreography more of performance art than a dance number with Shahid Kapoor's angsty expressions and staccato dance steps. The track employs heavy use of violins and oud with the tune infused with Middle Eastern musical influences while retaining a folksy sound. The drums were replaced with a Rubab prelude followed by ghatam beats for "Bismil". The song was shot at snow-capped Martand Sun Temple, near Anantnag in Kashmir under presence of over 6,000 locals gathered.

Shahid Kapoor and Shraddha Kapoor launched the music of the film along with Vishal Bhardwaj at Radio Mirchi studios in Mumbai in mid-August 2014. The soundtrack had a digital as well as physical release on 12 September 2014.

In Haider, I needed the grave-diggers song, so I made "Aao Na". I wrote some lines, but Gulzarsaab only retained "Aao Na" and changed the rest. You'll be surprised to know that Gulzarsaab and I have never composed a song, sitting at a place. All our songs have been written and composed at airports or in cars. Most of the times, he is standing in a queue saying the lines, while I sing it back to him on the phone.

— Bhardwaj on composing the songs for the soundtrack album (in an interview with The Indian Express)

== Track listing ==
=== Songs ===
The track listing was released on 9 September 2014. The track "Gulon Mein Rang Bhare" is originally composed by Mehdi Hassan and additionally composed by Vishal Bhardwaj.

All lyrics are written by Gulzar; all music is composed by Vishal Bhardwaj.

Haider (Original Motion Picture Soundtrack)
No.	Title	Lyrics	Music	Artist(s)	Length
1.	"Aao Na"	Gulzar	Vishal Bhardwaj	Vishal Bhardwaj, Vishal Dadlani	04:16
2.	"Bismil"	Gulzar	Vishal Bhardwaj	Sukhwinder Singh, Vishal Bhardwaj	06:06
3.	"Khul Kabhi"	Gulzar	Vishal Bhardwaj	Arijit Singh	06:09
4.	"Gulon Mein Rang Bhare"	Faiz Ahmed Faiz	Vishal Bhardwaj	Arijit Singh	05:16
5.	"Ek Aur Bismil"	Gulzar	Vishal Bhardwaj	Sukhwinder Singh, Vishal Bhardwaj	04:03
6.	"Jhelum"	Gulzar	Vishal Bhardwaj	Vishal Bhardwaj	04:27
7.	"So Jao"	Gulzar	Vishal Bhardwaj	Vishal Bhardwaj, Bashir Lone, Muzamil Bhawani, Bashir Bhawani	02:06
8.	"Do Jahaan"	Gulzar	Vishal Bhardwaj	Vishal Bhardwaj, Suresh Wadkar, Shraddha Kapoor	04:25
9.	"Aaj Ke Naam"	Faiz Ahmed Faiz	Vishal Bhardwaj	Rekha Bhardwaj	04:15
Total length:					40:56

=== Original score ===
Haider: Original Motion Picture Score

Film score by Vishal Bhardwaj
- Released: 24 October 2014
- Recorded: 2013—14
- Genre: Film score
- Length: 42:02
- Labels: Times Music; UTV Records
- Producer: Vishal Bhardwaj

All music is composed by Vishal Bhardwaj.

Haider (Original Motion Picture Score)
No.	Title	Writer(s)	Length
1.	"Haider Theme"	Vishal Bhardwaj	1:24
2.	"Conflict"	Vishal Bhardwaj	2:15
3.	"Operation Bulbul"	Vishal Bhardwaj	1:17
4.	"Crackdown"	Vishal Bhardwaj	3:29
5.	"Threat"	Vishal Bhardwaj	0:23
6.	"Election"	Vishal Bhardwaj	2:49
7.	"Mukhbir"	Vishal Bhardwaj	3:06
8.	"Roohdar"	Vishal Bhardwaj	2:59
9.	"Graveyard"	Vishal Bhardwaj	1:49
10.	"Mama2"	Vishal Bhardwaj	1:29
11.	"The Past"	Vishal Bhardwaj	2:28
12.	"Downtown"	Vishal Bhardwaj	2:36
13.	"Prayer"	Vishal Bhardwaj	1:20
14.	"Execution"	Vishal Bhardwaj	1:52
15.	"Liyaqat's Return"	Vishal Bhardwaj	1:28
16.	"Duel"	Vishal Bhardwaj	2:50
17.	"Attack"	Vishal Bhardwaj	1:04
18.	"Freedom"	Vishal Bhardwaj	1:53
19.	"Sacrifice"	Vishal Bhardwaj	5:31
Total length:			42:02

== Critical response ==
The soundtrack as well as the score gained mostly positive reviews from music critics.

=== Songs ===
Suanshu Khurana wrote in The Indian Express, "What works for most of the album is that Bhardwaj puts out great moments with subtlety." She called the album a "A master stroke" giving 4 stars (out of 5) Kasmin Fernandes at The Times of India felt that director-composer Vishal Bhardwaj had ingeniously infused the flavours of Kashmiri folk songs and instruments while lyricist Gulzar had brought in the nuances of Urdu into the film's soundtrack. She gave the album 4 stars out of 5. Surabhi Redkar for Koimoi gave the album 4 out of 5 stars stated, "The soundtrack of Haider is bold and expresses sorrow at its best without making the listener morose. This is a brilliant album that brings out the best works by composer Vishal Bhardwaj, lyricist Gulzar and the extraordinary singers as well. It is hard to say which is the best song in this album as almost every song has its own special charm. If only all composers knew how to convey angst, sorrow and love in such a beautiful manner." Deccan Music named it as the Best Hindi album for the year 2014. For Bollyspice, Prathna Tiwari wrote, "There's been a distinct effort to deliver a variety of genres, which is extremely commendable. Above and beyond that you appreciate the makers brilliance of ensuring the theatrical essence of the script at hand is the sole driving force of the entire album." On the contrary, writing for Bollywood Hungama, critic Rajiv Vijayakar felt, "The music is acutely disappointing for the status of the music people involved in the enterprise, and will not contribute to the appeal of the film. Maybe the songs will fit in somewhat better in the film, but that will not make much difference in this case."

=== Original score ===
Writing for The Hindu, Sudhish Kamath called the score rocking and music loaded lyrics.Rajeev Masand of CNN-IBN stated, "Bhardwaj lines up his instruments, employing camera, music, and artful production design to deliver a moody drama that feels consistently authentic." Writing for Deccan Chronicle, Kusumita Das noted, "The score is as intense as it is gorgeous, underplayed when needed, deftly supporting the story and its characters all the way. Our own Bollywood's Bard even sings Jhelum, one of the most haunting tracks in the film. Another standout is Bismil for just the way it narrates the story of treachery in neat and crisp verses." Critic Subhash K. Jha who praised the score, felt, "Mr. Bhardwaj's background score rises and falls in swelling tides of blood soaked undulations." Critic Raja Sen of Rediff stated that the score is gorgeous, underscoring the narrative perfectly. Faheem Ruhani for India Today lauded the score, "Bhardwaj's use of background score to heighten the dramatic tension between the characters is something that you have already seen before in his past work. In Haider, he serves a haunting score that leaves you in awe." Zee News's critic Ritika Handoo reviewed, "The background music is enchanting, and the songs too will leave a mark." Srijana Mitra Das of The Times of India stated that the elaborate background music frames some scenes too richly. Sweta Kaushal for Hindustan Times noted, "The music and background score go hand-in-hand with the narrative and scaringly haunt you throughout." Critic Shubhra Gupta at The Indian Express summarized, "The drama is pumped up by swelling orchestral background music, calling attention to itself. Vishal Bharadwaj film knits the poetry and music so integrally and beautifully into his films." Writing for Filmfare magazine, Rachit Gupta felt, "Couple with Bhardwaj's music and you're guaranteed a haunting experience. "

== Personnel ==
Credits adapted from CD liner notes.

- Music producer: Ketan Sodha (All songs)
- Additional music producer: Tushar Parate (for the song "Do Jahaan") | Simaab Sen (for the song "Jhelum")
- Recording engineer: Salman Khan Afridi
- Mixing engineer: Steve Fitzmaurice (All songs except the track "Jhelum") | Tre Nagella (for the track "Jhelum")
- Assistant mix engineer: Darren Heelis
- Mastering engineer: Christian Wright
- String engineer: Steve Price (at Angel Recording Studios, London)
- String engineer assistance: Jeremy Murphy

Musicians

- Guitars: Arijit Singh, Ankur Mukherjee, Tushar Parte, Mayukh Sarkar
- Tabla: Vinayak Netke
- Violins: Perry Montague Mason, Patrick Kiernan
- Viola: Bruce White
- Cello: Ian Burdge

For the track "Bismil"

- Choir arrangements: Neuman Pinto
- Choir vocals: Neuman Pinto, Bianca Gomes, Francois Castellino, Vivienne Pocha, Rajiv Sunderesan, R. N. Iyer, Kaustubh Date, Mandar Apte, Arun Ingle

For the track "So Jao"

- Choir vocals: Mayukh Sarkar, Aalaap Majgavkar, Sourabh Joshi
