= The Kerala Story =

2023 Indian Hindi language film

- Theatrical release poster
- Directed by: Sudipto Sen
- Written by: Suryapal Singh; Sudipto Sen; Vipul Amrutlal Shah
- Produced by: Vipul Amrutlal Shah
- Starring: Adah Sharma; Siddhi Idnani; Yogita Bihani; Sonia Balani
- Cinematography: Prasantanu Mohapatra
- Edited by: Sanjay Sharma
- Music by: Viresh Sreevalsa; Bishakh Jyoti
- Production company: Sunshine Pictures
- Release date: 5 May 2023
- Running time: 138 minutes
- Country: India
- Language: Hindi
- Budget: ₹15–20 crore
- Box office: est. ₹303.97 crore

The Kerala Story is a 2023 Indian Hindi-language drama film directed by Sudipto Sen and produced by Vipul Amrutlal Shah. It stars Adah Sharma, Siddhi Idnani, Yogita Bihani and Sonia Balani. The plot follows a group of women from Kerala who are coerced into converting to Islam and joining the Islamic State. Marketed as a true story, the film is premised on the Hindutva theory of "love jihad", and claims that thousands of Hindu women from Kerala have been converted to Islam and recruited in the Islamic State. However, the filmmakers had to accept the addition of two disclaimers – that the figures in the film were inauthentic, and that the film was a "fictionalised" depiction of events.

The Kerala Story released in theatres on 5 May 2023. With a worldwide gross of ₹303.97 crore (US$32 million), it became the ninth-highest-grossing Hindi film of 2023. It was heavily promoted by the incumbent Bharatiya Janata Party (BJP), which leveraged the film in its campaigning for the 2023 Karnataka assembly election.

The film was met with overwhelmingly negative reviews and panned by critics. It received heavy criticism for its illogical screenplay, cast performances, the inaccurate depiction of Kerala State, and was characterised as a propaganda film. The film has also faced protracted litigation and protests, primarily in Kerala, West Bengal and Tamil Nadu. At the 71st National Film Awards, The Kerala Story won 2 awards: Best Direction (Sen) and Best Cinematography.

== Plot ==
Fatima is accused of being a terrorist and is caught at the Afghan–Iran border. During her interrogation, she reveals that her real name is Shalini Unnikrishnan, a young woman from Kerala who was brainwashed into converting to Islam and becoming a terrorist. The film flashes back to a few months earlier.

Shalini, a Hindu, lives with her mother and grandmother in Kerala and later goes to the city to study nursing. There, she meets three friends – Nimah Matthew (a Christian), Gitanjali (a fellow Hindu), and Asifa (a Muslim). The four bond well, but Asifa, who is part of an Islamic Jihadi group, begins to influence the group. She frequently insists that there is only one religion and one god in the world, warning that people who don't believe in this will never attain salvation.

Asifa, along with Abdul and Rameez, creates an atmosphere of fear and manipulation among the group. Over time, Shalini and Gitanjali start wearing the hijab and begin to believe in the ideology that only one god exists. Meanwhile, Nimah, sensing something is wrong, starts to distance herself from the group and eventually parts ways.

Shalini becomes romantically involved with Rameez and soon finds herself pregnant. Under pressure, she is forced to convert to Islam. However, Rameez abandons her, as per the group's plan, leaving her vulnerable and alone. She is then coerced into marrying Ishaq, believing that he will provide a secure future for her and her unborn child. At the wedding ceremony, her mother desperately tries to stop her and bring her home, but a brainwashed Shalini refuses and leaves her mother in tears.

What Shalini does not know is that her marriage is just another step in the plan. During her honeymoon in Sri Lanka, her phone is confiscated. Instead of flying back to India, she is flown to Pakistan, where she is then illegally trafficked across multiple borders, enduring a harrowing journey that eventually leads her to Syria. There, she is groomed to become a suicide bomber, her life completely taken over by the group's extremist agenda.

== Cast ==
- Adah Sharma as Shalini Unnikrishnan / Fatima Ba
- Yogita Bihani as Nimah Mathews
- Sonia Balani as Asifa Ba
- Siddhi Idnani as Geethanjali Menon / Anisha Ba
- Devadarshini as Shalini's mother
- Vijay Krishna as Ishak
- Pranay Pachauri as Rameez
- Pranav Misshra as Abdul
- Pranali Ghogare as Shaziya

== Production and release ==
The film was produced by Vipul Amrutlal Shah, who is also the creative director.

It released in theatres on 5 May 2023. The digital streaming rights of the film were purchased by ZEE5. The film began streaming on the platform from 16 February 2024.

Prior to its domestic release, the film went through CBFC scrutiny and received an adults only classification following a number of requested changes.

== Premise and factual accuracy ==
The teaser released on 3 November 2022, featuring the character of Fathima Ba, a Hindu Malayali nurse who had converted to Islam and joined the Islamic State, before ending up in an Afghan jail. She claimed to be one of 32,000 girls from Hindu and Christian communities who are missing from Kerala and have been recruited into the Islamic State after being converted to Islam. Sen, the director of the film, has made such claims for years. In 2018, he directed a documentary on what he claimed to be the involuntary mass conversion of 32,000 Hindu and Christian girls to Islam as part of an "international conspiracy" to render Kerala an Islamic state.

While the events portrayed in the film are loosely based on the accounts of three women from Kerala, namely: Nimisha Nair, Sonia Sebastian, and Merin Jacob, who converted to Islam and traveled with their respective husbands to Afghanistan to join the Islamic State between 2016 and 2018, the claimed figures in the film are wildly inaccurate, being based on mistranslations, misquotes, and misrepresentations of unrelated statistics. No more than 100-200 Indians have joined the group from the entire country, with people from Kerala accounting for less than a quarter of them. The figures posited in the film also exceed the entire strength of the Islamic State.

Later, in response to litigation, the film-makers removed all promotional materials, including the teaser, that had the erroneous figure. However, the film repeated the claims multiple times, and once raised it even higher to 50,000. In response to further litigation, Sen admitted to all figures in the film being inauthentic, and that the film was a "fictionalised" portrayal of real-life events.

The British Board of Film Classification, while awarding the film an 18 rating due to its depiction of sexual violence, noted that it presented "a partial and unbalanced view of Islam which focuses on radical Islamist characters and motivations to the exclusion of more moderate and mainstream forms of the faith."

== Response and controversy ==
=== Promotion by ruling party ===
The ruling Bharatiya Janata Party (BJP) and its associated organisation, the Rashtriya Swayamsevak Sangh (RSS) have supported the film; the party used it for their political messaging in the campaigning for Karnataka assembly elections. Prime Minister Narendra Modi endorsed the film at an election rally in Karnataka, claimed that it had unearthed a "conspiracy", and alleged the Indian National Congress – which opposed the film – to support terrorism. BJP President J. P. Nadda held special screenings of the film and invited "young Hindu girls" to watch it with them. The film was made tax free in Madhya Pradesh as well as Uttar Pradesh; both the states have BJP governments. Organiser, the official mouthpiece of RSS, described the film as a "dangerous truth".

=== Political opposition ===
In Kerala, both the Communist Party of India (Marxist) and Indian National Congress, the only two parties to have governed the state since Independence, have objected to the film for spreading "communal misinformation" in tune with the agenda of the Sangh Parivar. In Tamil Nadu, Dravida Munnetra Kazhagam (DMK), which is the ruling party of the state, along with Naam Tamilar Katchi (NTK), Tamil Nadu Muslim Munnetra Kazhagam and multiple Muslim political organisations teamed up with CPI(M) and Congress to protest against the film .

=== Public protests ===
The film has attracted public protests in Kerala and Tamil Nadu. It fared poorly in Tamil Nadu, apparently forcing the Tamil Nadu Multiplex Association to stop further screenings; however, the filmmakers dispute the claims and allege political censorship. The film had a similar fate in Kerala.

=== Bans and litigation ===
On the eve of release, several petitions were filed at the Madras High Court, Kerala High Court and the Supreme Court of India, calling for a ban on grounds of promoting communal disharmony. The petitions were either declined to be heard or dismissed by the courts; however, the film-makers were asked to remove all promotional materials, including the teaser, that claimed thirty two thousand girls to have converted to Islam and joined the Islamic State in real life.

On 8 May, the Government of West Bengal banned the movie, characterising the film as "hate speech", and citing adverse intelligence reports that had reported increased communal tensions in the audience. The filmmakers challenged the decision in the Supreme Court and the ban was stayed. However, the filmmakers had to accept the addition of two disclaimers – that the figures in the film were inauthentic, and that the film was a "fictionalised" portrayal of real-life events.

=== Controversy over National Film Award ===
The film's National Film Award win drew criticism from political leaders in Kerala. Chief Minister Pinarayi Vijayan accused the film of spreading misinformation and promoting communal narratives, calling the award an insult to Indian cinema's secular tradition. Opposition leader V. D. Satheesan and Congress MP K. C. Venugopal also condemned the decision, alleging political bias and misuse of the award to promote a divisive agenda. Both the ruling Left Democratic Front and the opposition United Democratic Front opposed the recognition, while the Bharatiya Janata Party supported the film. Actor-politician Prakash Raj also criticized the National Award juries for awarding the film.

== Reception ==
=== Box office ===
On its opening day, the film grossed ₹8.03 crore in India, making it the fifth highest opener in India for 2023. As of 15 June 2023, the film had grossed ₹288.04 crore (US$30 million) in India and ₹15.64 crore (US$1.6 million) overseas for a worldwide gross collection of ₹303.97 crore (US$32 million), becoming the seventh-highest grossing Hindi film of 2023. The film performed well in northern India but underperformed in the south.

=== Critical reception ===
The Kerala Story received overwhelmingly negative reviews and was panned by critics for its illogical screenplay, cast performances, the inaccurate depiction of Kerala State, and its Islamophobic propaganda. On the review aggregator website Rotten Tomatoes, 14% of 7 critics' reviews are positive, with an average rating of 3.5/10.

Saibal Chatterjee of NDTV rated the film 0.5 out of 5 stars, calling it a "lengthy WhatsApp forward", and writing that Sen's work was laughably inept and in pursuance of an insidious agenda. Shubhra Gupta of The Indian Express gave the film 1 out of 5 stars, characterising it as a "poorly-made, poorly-acted rant" that flattened Muslims into absolute evils. She later included the film as one of the worst films of 2023. Nandini Ramnath of Scroll.in found the raison d'être of the film to lie in propagating Islamophobia, with every Muslim character being coded as a fanatic. Anuj Kumar of The Hindu described the work as "burlesque" propaganda that borrowed its understanding of Islam, from "hate-filled Whatsapp groups" and sought to turn the audience into purveyors of hate by peddling "half-truths".

Deepanjana Pal, reviewing for Film Companion, commented that the film was a "Giant Whatsapp forward" that could be hardly called a film, critiquing it for being political propaganda aimed at demonising Keralite Muslims and tapping into contemporary Hindu nationalist anxieties; Sen was "glaringly inept" in tackling the causes of radicalisation with sensitivity and merely preyed upon the grief of real survivors and victims. Sowmya Rajendran, reviewing for The News Minute, rated the film 1 star out of 5 star; she panned the film as "no-nuance propaganda" where women were treated as objects who were to be fought for between religions and ideologies by men.

India Today included the film as one of the five worst Hindi films of 2023.

== Music ==
The music of the film is composed by Viresh Sreevalsa and Bishakh Jyoti.

| No. | Title | Lyrics | Singer(s) | Length |
|---|---|---|---|---|
| 1. | "Pagal Parindey" | Ozil Dalal | Sunidhi Chauhan, Bishakh Jyoti | 2:04 |
| 2. | "Ambo Ambambo" | Viresh Sreevalsa | Athul Narukara | 1:52 |
| 3. | "Athira Ravil" | Viresh Sreevalsa | K. S. Chithra | 2:07 |
| 4. | "Tu Mila" | Ozil Dalal | K. S. Chithra | 2:07 |
| 5. | "Aakhir Kyun" | Anant, Porshia (Kurdish), Mahalakshmi Iyer | Bishakh Jyoti | 5:01 |
| 6. | "Aakhir Kyun Unplugged" | Anant | Bishakh Jyoti | 5:08 |

== Sequel ==
A sequel, titled The Kerala Story 2 Goes Beyond, was released on February 27, 2026, worldwide.

== See also ==
- The Kashmir Files, a 2022 Indian film by Vivek Agnihotri about the exodus of Kashmiri Hindus
- Foreign fighters in the Syrian civil war and War in Iraq § India, about the limited presence of India Muslims in the Islamic State
- Islamic State – Hind Province, the claimed Indian province of the Islamic State
- Love jihad conspiracy theory, a false narrative of Muslim men allegedly converting Hindu women through romantic relationships.
