= Marzi (TV series) =

2020 Indian Hindi-language web-series

- Genre: Thriller
- Developed by: Ding Entertainment; Viacom 18 Studios
- Written by: Radhika Anand
- Directed by: Anil Senior
- Creative director: Akshaye Sharma.
- Starring: Rajeev Khandelwal; Aahana Kumra; Suhaas Ahuja; Vivek Mushran; Rajeev Siddhartha; Pavleen Gujral; Abhay verma
- Theme music composer: Sharad Joshi.
- Country of origin: India
- Original language: Hindi
- No. of seasons: 1
- No. of episodes: 6

Production
- Producers: Sukesh Motwani; Mautik Tolia; Vishwankar Pathania
- Editor: Praveen Kathikuloth
- Camera setup: Multi-camera
- Running time: 40-45 minutes
- Production company: Viacom 18

Original release
- Network: Voot
- Release: 3 March 2020

Marzi is a 2020 Indian Hindi-language crime thriller series that aired on Voot. The story is based on the novel Liar, written by Jack and Harry Williams. The series stars Rajeev Khandelwal and Aahana Kumra. The show is directed by Anil Senior. The six-episode series aired on Voot on 3 March 2020.

== Plot ==
The story is set amidst the picturesque locales of Shimla wherein Sameera Chauhan (Aahana Kumra), a cheerful school teacher is all set to give love a shot again after an ugly breakup with her fiancé Nitin (Rajeev Siddhartha). She agrees to go on a dinner date with the charming and respectable surgeon Anurag Saraswat (Rajeev Khandelwal) but which soon turns out to be a nightmare for her. Sameera wakes up to find out that she is sexually assaulted and is convinced that Anurag is the culprit.

== Cast ==
- Rajeev Khandelwal as Anurag Saraswat
- Aahana Kumra as Sameera Chauhan
- Vivek Mushran as Subodh
- Rajeev Siddhartha as Nitin
- Suhaas Ahuja as Shaan
- Shivani Tanksale as Isha
- Abhay verma as Ayaan
- Amit Jairath as Dinesh
- Pavleen Gujral as Rashmi

== Episodes ==
No.	Title	Directed by	Written by	Original release date
1	"His Truth Vs. Her Truth"	Anil Senior	Radhika Anand	3 March 2020
2	"Old Habits Die Hard"	Anil Senior	Radhika Anand	3 March 2020
3	"Lies, Lies and More Lies"	Anil Senior	Radhika Anand	3 March 2020
4	"The Doctor Of Deceit"	Anil Senior	Radhika Anand	3 March 2020
5	"Nothing To Lose!"	Anil Senior	Radhika Anand	3 March 2020
6	"The Collision Course"	Anil Senior	Radhika Anand	3 March 2020
