= Stardust Award for Best Actor in a Drama =

Film award in India

The Stardust Best Drama Actor is chosen by the readers of the annual Stardust magazine. The award honours a star that has made an impact with their acting in that certain film.

== List of winners ==
- 2011 Hrithik Roshan for Guzaarish as Ethan Mascarenhas
  - Abhishek Bachchan for Khelein Hum Jee Jaan Sey
  - Amitabh Bachchan for Rann
  - Ranbir Kapoor for Raajneeti
  - Shah Rukh Khan for My Name Is Khan
  - Sanjay Dutt for Lamhaa
- 2012 Hrithik Roshan for Zindagi Na Milegi Dobara as Arjun Saluja
  - Amitabh Bachchan for Aarakshan as Prabhakar Anand
  - Saif Ali Khan for Aarakshan as Deepak Kumar
  - Salman Khan for Bodyguard as Bodyguard Lovely Singh
  - Ranbir Kapoor for Rockstar as Janardhan "Jordan" Jakhar / JJ
- 2013 Hrithik Roshan for Agneepath as Vijay Deenanath Chauhan
  - Paresh Rawal for OMG – Oh My God!
  - Ranbir Kapoor for Barfi!
  - Saif Ali Khan for Cocktail
- 2015 Shahid Kapoor for Haider as Haider
  - Amitabh Bachchan for Bhoothnath Returns
  - Naseeruddin Shah for Dedh Ishqiya
  - Randeep Hooda for Highway
- 2018 Ayushmann Khurrana for Bareilly Ki Barfi as Chirag Dubey
  - Salman Khan for Tiger Zinda Hai
  - Ajay Devgn for Golmaal Again
  - Varun Dhawan for Badrinath Ki Dulhania

== See also ==
- Stardust Awards
- Bollywood
- Cinema of India
