= Bhor (film) =

Indian film

- Directed by: Kamakhya Narayan Singh
- Produced by: Rohit Singh
- Starring: Nalneesh Neel; Saveree Gaur; Devesh Ranjan
- Production company: Gyanesh Films Production House
- Distributed by: MX Player
- Release dates: 2018 (IFFI); 5 February 2021
- Running time: 93 Minutes
- Country: India
- Language: Hindi

Bhor is an Indian Hindi-language Drama film directed by Kamakhya Narayan Singh and Produced by Anjani Kumar Singh. It stars Nalneesh Neel, Saveree Sri Gaur, Devesh Ranjan, Pavleen Gujral. The movie is streaming on MX Player.

== Release ==
The film was released on 5 February 2021 on MX Player.

== Cast ==
- Nalneesh Neel
- Saveree Sri Gaur
- Pavleen Gujral
- Devesh Ranjan
- Annukampa Harsh
- Devendra Patel

== Plot ==
It's a story about Budhni married before legal age of getting married, a poor and backward girl who fights for living life in her own way, right from completing her studies after marriage to having a toilet in her village to avoid open defecation. This later becomes an inspiration and turns into a national movement.

== Premiere ==
- International Film Festival of India, Goa 2018 (November)
- Cairo International Film Festival, Cairo, Egypt 2019
- Indian Film Festival of Melbourne, Australia
- Indo-Germany Bollywood week
- Bengaluru International Film Festival, Bengaluru.
- Asian Film Festival, Pune
- Aurangabad International Film Festival
- Indian Panorama, Delhi
- Jharkhand International Film Festival, Ranchi
- India Habitat International Film Festival, Delhi
- Chalachitra, Guwahati
- Jagran Film Festival, Patna
- Jagran Film Festival, Ranchi
- Jagran Film Festival, Mumbai
- Azamgrah International Film Festival, Uttar Pradesh
- Kalinga International Film Festival, Bhubneshwar
- Raipur International Film Festival, Raipur,
- Woodpecker International Film Festival, Delhi
- Lonavla International Film Festival, Lonavla
- Siliguri International Film Festival, Chennai,
- India Panorama, Chennai
- India Panorama, Cochin

== Awards ==
- Won Best Director at Ottawa Indian Film Festival, Ottawa, Canada 2019
- Won Best Film Social Issue at Caleidoscope Indian Film Festival of Boston, 2020
- Won Best Actor in Negative Role at Caleidoscope Indian Film Festival of Boston, 2020
