= Stolen (2023 film) =

- Release poster
- Directed by: Karan Tejpal
- Written by: Karan Tejpal; Gaurav Dhingra; Swapnil Salkar Agadbumb
- Screenplay by: Karan Tejpal
- Dialogues by: Shubham Vardhan; Swapnil Salkar Agadbumb
- Produced by: Gaurav Dhingra
- Starring: Abhishek Banerjee; Shubham Vardhan; Mia Maelzer; Harish Khanna; Sahidur Rahaman
- Cinematography: Isshaan Ghosh
- Edited by: Shreyas Beltangdy
- Music by: Arpad Bondy
- Production company: Jungle Book Studio
- Distributed by: Amazon Prime Video
- Release date: August 2023 (Venice); June 4 2025
- Running time: 93 minutes
- Country: India
- Language: Hindi

Stolen is a 2023 Indian Hindi-language thriller film directed by Karan Tejpal and produced by Gaurav Dhingra under the banner of Jungle Book Studio. The film stars Abhishek Banerjee in the lead role. The film delves into the harrowing journey of two urban brothers who become entangled in the desperate search for a kidnapped baby, but circumstances spiral out of control when they are themselves mistaken for the kidnappers leading to an extended road battle for survival. The film intends to highlight the themes of trust, conscience, and societal divides. The film explores the exploitation of law enforcement by anti-social behaviour and the impact of mob psychology.The film was first premiered in the 2023 Venice Film Festival on 31 August 2023. It premiered on Amazon Prime Video on 4 June 2025.

The film was featured at the 14th Beijing International Film Festival, where it won the Tiantan Awards for Best Director, Best Actress, and Best Cinematography. It fetched Best Director, and Audience Awards at the "2024 Skip City International Digital Cinema Festival, Japan". At the Zurich Film Festival it won Special Mention and Asia's Best Independent Dramatic Feature at the "All Asian Independent Film Festival".

Additionally, filmmakers Anurag Kashyap, Kiran Rao, Nikkhil Advani, and Vikramaditya Motwane came on board as executive producers on the film.

== Plot ==
In the early hours at a remote railway station in rural India, two brothers, Gautam (Abhishek Banerjee) and Raman (Shubham Vardhan), witness a baby being stolen from Jhumpa Mahato (Mia Maelzer), an impoverished tribal woman. While Raman, guided by moral duty, insists on helping Jhumpa, Gautam is initially reluctant. Their decision to assist propels them into a perilous investigation, where they are mistaken for kidnappers themselves, leading to a relentless and emotionally charged chase through hostile terrains.

== Cast ==
- Abhishek Banerjee as Gautam Bansal
- Shubham Vardhan as Raman Bansal, Gautam's Younger Brother
- Mia Maelzer as Jhumpa Mahato
- Harish Khanna as Constable Pandit Ji
- Sahidur Rahaman as Inspector Shakti Singh
- Saarthak Dewan as Acchelal
- Nirupama Verma as Gautam & Raman's Mother
- Kritikka Avasthi as Indu, Gautam's Wife
- Baby Tanya as Champa
- Lovekush Kundu as Railway Police
- Shrishti as Surili
- Bhanu as Tea Boy
- Kabeer as Senior Forest Official
- Rakesh Singh as Dr. KT Dhingra
- Alisha Soni as Rehab Warden
- Mahendra Sharma as Rana
- Roonj as Nurse
- Altaf as Station Master
- Bhakti Dange as Geetu

== Production ==
The director of the film, Karan Tejpal, approached producer Gaurav Dhingra with an article about a real-life incident in which two young boys were mob-lynched in Assam in 2018. Deeply shaken by the event, Tejpal was determined to craft a film inspired by it. Pre-production began in 2019, but the production process was delayed due to the COVID-19 pandemic. Eventually, production resumed between 2022 and 2023.

As the producer, Gaurav Dhingra was committed to ensuring that the film was made on a scale that would resonate with a global audience. Swapnil Salkar, also known as 'Agadbumb', collaborated with Karan Tejpal and Gaurav Dhingra to co-write the dialogues and screenplay, shaping the film into a socially charged action thriller.

Initially, the team considered filming the entire movie in a single take. Although the idea was later dropped, the final film still features several long takes and immersive sequences. Stolen was shot in Pushkar, Rajasthan, with many of the mob members portrayed by real locals from the area.

Actor Abhishek Banerjee was excited by this unconventional filmmaking approach. He expressed his happiness at seeing the results match the vision they were shooting for. During production, crew members often had to walk several kilometers into remote desert locations to capture the film’s intense scenes.

The film had its world premiere at the 80th Venice Film Festival in 2023 where it received a standing ovation and also received recognition at the Zurich Film Festival. Sharing his thoughts on Stolen being screened at the Zurich Film Festival this year, producer Gaurav Dhingra of Jungle Book Studio, said in a statement, "This is such a special moment for us. The way our film Stolen has managed to steal hearts internationally, we are grateful and excited for this outpour of love and bringing our film to The Zurich Film Festival. As a producer, I feel extremely honored to have this opportunity to put India on the world map through our film. Here's hoping this is just the beginning for us and many more Indian films in the global markets."

== Release ==
Stolen has been available for streaming on Amazon Prime Video since June 4, 2025, accessible in over 240 countries and territories.

Following the release of the film, legendary actor Kamal Haasan hosted the Stolen team at his office in Chennai, Tamil Nadu. He appreciated Banerjee's performance and praised the film’s powerful vision while remarking that the story of Stolen holds a universal appeal.

== Reception ==
Indian critics praised the film’s raw depiction of class, and conscience. On the review aggregator website Rotten Tomatoes, 88% of 16 critics' reviews are positive, with an average rating of 6.7/10.

Anupama Chopra reviewed the 2025 film "Stolen" calling it a "harrowing, claustrophobic drama" that "will horrify and just hook you". She noted that the film, which follows two brothers caught up in a police investigation of a stolen baby, effectively uses handheld cameras, long takes, and a documentary style as reported by The Hollywood Reporter India.

Hardika Gupta of NDTV stated "Abhishek Banerjee delivers what is arguably the best performance of his career, shedding the comic persona often associated with him and slipping into a role that requires restraint, fear and eventual resolve." Rahul Desai of The Hollywood Reporter India writes in his review that "What I really like about Stolen is that it doesn’t pretend to hide its own blind spots. The decision to unfold from the point of view of the two urbane characters is a conscious one. It not only reflects the honest gaze of the makers and the fact that it’s these brothers who are the ‘hostile outsiders’ in this nameless region, it also reveals a sociocultural chasm that cannot be overcome with good intent and bleeding-heart-liberal vibes alone." Sukanya Verma of Rediff.com rated 3/5 stars and said that "Stolen's crisp running time and Abhishek Banerjee's metamorphosis from callous to crusader ensure the stark bits duly haunt and horrify". Tushar Joshi of India Today gave 4 stars out of 5 and said that "Actor Abhishek Banerjee delivers a powerful performance in the tense thriller 'Stolen', directed by newcomer Karan Tejpal. The film explores dark social themes while keeping viewers hooked from start to finish".

Shreyanka Mazumdar of News 18 gave 3.5 stars out of 5 and said that "Karan Tejpal’s Stolen feels like a gut punch. A 90-odd minute thriller that grips you from the first frame and doesn’t let go." Abhishek Srivastava of The Times of India rated 3.5/5 stars and writes that "Watch ‘Stolen’ for its gripping tension and raw portrayal of India’s class divide in a tight, emotional thriller." Lachmi Deb Roy of Firstpost gave 4 stars out of 5 and said that "Stolen though is filled with action, but not an edge-of-the-seat thriller and that’s what makes it different from other films. But action doesn’t overpower the real message of the film. Despite class power being a reality in our society, the movie makes us believe that there are selfless people in this world and that human goodness still exists."

A critique from Bollywood Hungama rated 3.5/5 stars and commented that "On the whole, STOLEN leaves an impact due to its stark realism, performances and edge-of-the-seat moments." Sonal Pandya of Times Now and said that "With a terrific screenplay and taut direction that accelerates your anxiety, Stolen is entirely convincing until its finale, when it leans a little too positively into the light. Well-acted and constructed, Tejpal's thriller is one that will remain with you even after the credits roll." Troy Ribeiro of The Free Press Journal observed that "The film works not because it solves any of the issues it raises—poverty, privilege, institutional decay—but because it dares to throw its characters and us into their crosshairs." Nandini Ramnath of Scroll.in writes in her review that "movie is inspired by the lynching of two men falsely accused of kidnapping in Assam in 2018. In Stolen, Raman’s decision to overrule the pragmatic Gautam’s objections and listen to his conscience leads to the rudest possible introduction to an unfamiliar, brutal side of India."

Rachit Gupta of Filmfare gave 4 stars out of 5 and said that " It is an intense action drama that delivers thrills and entertainment in abundance. The thrilling sequences, cinematography and more makes Stolen a must-watch." Shilajit Mitra of The Hindu said that "‘Stolen’, inspired by real events from 2018, has the atmospherics of a great Hindi chase film, but tells you nothing that you don’t already know".

== International acclaim ==
Stolen received critical acclaim following its premiere at the 80th Venice International Film Festival in 2023, where it was screened in the Orizzonti Extra section. The film was praised for its tight narrative, realistic performances, and social commentary. Critics highlighted Abhishek Banerjee’s portrayal of Gautam as one of the standout performances of his career.

The film won several awards at international film festivals, including Best Director, Best Cinematography, and Best Actress at the Beijing International Film Festival. It also won Best Film and Best Director at the Skip City International D-Cinema Festival in Japan, and received a Special Mention at the Zurich Film Festival.
