= Pavleen Gujral =

Indian actress and stage host

- Born: 6 August 1983 (age 42); Delhi, India
- Occupations: Actress; stage host

Pavleen Gujral is an Indian actress and stage host known for her work in Hindi films. She is known for her roles in Angry Indian Goddesses (2015), Bhor (2015), City of Dreams (2019), Marzi (2020), Gehraiyaan (2022), and Sukhee (2023).

== Early life ==
Gujral was born and raised in Delhi, India. She completed her schooling from the Air Force Bal Bharati School, Delhi and graduated with a BSc in Computer Science from Delhi University. Additionally, she also completed an LLB from Delhi University.

== Career ==
Pavleen made her acting debut in the film Angry Indian Goddesses (2015).

== Filmography ==
=== Films ===
Year	Title	Role	Notes
2015	Angry Indian Goddesses	Pamela Jaiswal "Pammi"	
2018	Bhor	Madam	
2019	Dolly Kitty Aur Woh Chamakte Sitare	Juhi	
2020	The Dirty Word	Senorita	Short film
2021	State of Siege: Temple Attack	Security Guard at Temple	
2022	Gehraiyaan	Sonali Khanna	
2023	Sukhee	Tanvi Gaikwad	
2026	Alpha	Dr. Preeti	

=== Television ===
Year	Title	Role	Notes
2019	City of Dreams	Lipakshi Chopra	
2019	Parchhayee	Chutki	
2019	Made in Heaven	Journalist	
2019	Dude	Rituparna	
2020	Marzi	Rashmi	
