= Sukhee =

2023 Indian drama film

- Theatrical release poster
- Directed by: Sonal Joshi
- Written by: Story: Radhika Anand; Screenplay: Paulomi Dutta; Dialogues: Rupinder Inderjit
- Produced by: Bhushan Kumar; Krishan Kumar; Vikram Malhotra; Shikhaa Sharma
- Starring: Shilpa Shetty; Amit Sadh; Dilnaz Irani; Kusha Kapila; Pavleen Gujral
- Cinematography: R. Dee
- Edited by: Vini N Raj
- Music by: Score: Karan Kulkarni; Song: Badshah - Hiten; Arko
- Production companies: Abundantia Entertainment; T-Series Films
- Distributed by: Pen Marudhar Entertainment
- Release date: 22 September 2023
- Running time: 139 minutes
- Country: India
- Language: Hindi
- Box office: ₹1.65 crore

Sukhee is a 2023 Indian Hindi-language comedy drama film directed by Sonal Joshi in her directorial debut. It stars Shilpa Shetty in the lead role with Amit Sadh, Dilnaz Irani, Kusha Kapila and Pavleen Gujral. The film was released on 22 September 2023 to mixed reviews from critics.

== Synopsis ==
A humorous slice-of-life tale about 38-year-old Punjabi housewife Sukhpreet "Sukhee" Kalra, who, sick of her routine existence, travels to Delhi to attend her high school reunion. Sukhee relives her teenage years while experiencing a variety of things over the course of just seven days, emerging reignited, reborn, and making the hardest shift of her life—from being a wife and mother to being a woman once more.

== Cast ==
- Shilpa Shetty as Sukhpreet "Sukhee" Singh Kalra (nee Gill)
- Amit Sadh as Vikram Verma
- Kusha Kapila as Meher Chhibber
- Dilnaz Irani as Mansi Parekh
- Pavleen Gujral as Tanvi Gaikwad
- Chaitanya Choudhry as Guru Singh Kalra, Sukhee's husband
- Kiran Kumar as Colonel V. K. Gill, Sukhee's father
- Vinod Nagpal as Sukhee's grandfather in law
- Purnima Rathod as Sukhee's mother
- Sandeep Kapoor as Jogi
- Maahi Jain as Jaspreet "Jassi" Kalra, Sukhee's daughter
- Jyoti Kapoor as Ranjita
- Anjali Sharma as Babli

== Production ==
Principal photography commenced in March 2022. Production wrapped in June 2022.

== Music ==
Sukhee

Soundtrack album by Badshah - Hiten, Arko
- Released: 21 September 2023
- Recorded: 2022
- Genre: Feature film soundtrack
- Length: 11:06
- Language: Hindi
- Label: T-Series

Official audio
- Sukhee - Full Album on YouTube

The music of the film is composed by Badshah - Hiten, Arko while lyrics written by Raja Dilwala and Rashmi Virag.

Title Track
No.	Title	Lyrics	Music	Singer(s)	Length
1.	"Nasha"	Raja Dilwala	Badshah - Hiten	Badshah, Chakshu Kotwal, Afsana Khan	3:33
2.	"Meethi Boliyan"	Rashmi Virag	Arko	Sachet Tandon	4:00
3.	"Nasha" (Badshah Version)	Raja Dilwala	Badshah - Hiten	Badshah, Chakshu Kotwal, Afsana Khan	3:33
Total length:					11:06

== Reception ==
The film received mostly mixed reviews from critics. On the review aggregator website Rotten Tomatoes, 17% of 6 critics' reviews are positive, with an average rating of 6/10.

In The Times of India, Renuka Vyavahare gave the film 3 out of 5 stars and wrote, "Sukhee has a heartfelt premise but it lacks pace, struggles to be engaging and gets too preachy to be perfect towards the end." On the website OTTPlay, Ishita Sengupta was negative, writing that, "Sukhee joins an increasing list of outings that intends uncovering the feminist undertones of being a homemaker, something that traditionally has been looked down upon. But in doing so, it also sees it as a problem that needs solving."
