= Rennervations =

- Genre: Documentary
- Created by: Jeremy Renner
- Starring: Jeremy Renner; Anthony Mackie; Vanessa Hudgens; Anil Kapoor; Sebastián Yatra
- Country of origin: United States
- Original language: English
- No. of seasons: 1
- No. of episodes: 4

Production
- Executive producers: Patrick Costello; Romilda De Luca
- Running time: 45–50 minutes
- Production companies: Battle Born Motors; Boardwalk Pictures; Movie4; Buoyrock Entertainment

Original release
- Network: Disney+
- Release: April 12, 2023

Rennervations is an American documentary miniseries created by Jeremy Renner and Nate Sorrentino for Disney+. It follows Jeremy Renner who travels across the world to help communities by reimagining purpose-built vehicles. The series also features various guest appearances. It premiered on April 12, 2023.

== Premise ==
Rennervations is an original four-part series that embraces Jeremy Renner's lifelong passion to give back to communities around the world by reimagining unique purpose-built vehicles to meet a community's needs. Behind the big screen, Jeremy is a construction aficionado, and he is heavily invested in the highly creative fabricator culture that exists across the globe and hopes to change lives with these skills and inspire others to do the same. In each episode, Jeremy has the help of his celebrity friends – actress and singer Vanessa Hudgens, Indian actor, megastar and "Mission: Impossible" co-star Anil Kapoor, Latin music superstar Sebastián Yatra, and "Avengers" and "Hurt Locker" co-star Anthony Mackie – to deliver the repurposed vehicle helping each organization fulfill their mission.

== Cast ==
- Jeremy Renner as Himself
- Anthony Mackie as Himself
- Vanessa Hudgens as Herself
- Anil Kapoor as Himself
- Sebastián Yatra as Himself

== Episodes ==
No.	Title	Original release date
1	"Chicago: Building a Mobile Music Bus (ft. Vanessa Hudgens)"	April 12, 2023
2	"Los Cabos, Mexico: Building a Mobile Dance Studio (ft. Sebastián Yatra)"	April 12, 2023
3	"Reno: Building a Mobile Recreation Center (ft. Anthony Mackie)"	April 12, 2023
4	"Rajasthan, India: Building a Mobile Water Treatment Center (ft. Anil Kapoor)"	May 3, 2023

== Release ==
The series premiered on Disney+ on April 12, 2023. It consists of four episodes.

== Reception ==
=== Critical response ===
The review aggregator website Rotten Tomatoes reported a 75% approval rating with an average rating of 8.00/10, based on 8 critic reviews.

Joel Keller of Decider asserted, "Rennervations is a touch frantic and a little unhinged, but that just seems to be a reflection of its star’s personality. We love seeing the conversions and the organizations that will get these really fun new vehicles." Alison Herman of Variety said, "Rennervations is designed to be a feel-good show, following the actor as he restores retired vehicles for use by youth-focused charities. But offscreen events have conspired to give its predictable triumphs — assignment, engineering, execution, delivery — an added dimension" Tony Bradley of Forbes wrote, "Rennervations is a unique series that highlights the importance of community service and the role that technology plays in making ambitious projects possible. Renner and his team demonstrate the power of collaboration, innovation, and education in driving positive change in communities worldwide." Brandon Zachary of Comic Book Resources stated, "There's a sweetness to Renner and his passions that prove infectiously charming. A well-constructed series, Rennervations is elevated by the genuine sincerity of its presentation." Joly Herman of Common Sense Media gave the series a grade of 4 out of 5 stars, praised the presence of positive messages and role models, citing teamwork and benevolence, and complimented the educational value, writing, "Pace lags a little, but strong messages shine through."

=== Accolades ===
Rennervations was nominated for Best Streaming Nonfiction Series at the 1st Astra Creative Arts TV Awards.
