= World's Toughest Trucker =

- Series 1 logo
- Genre: Reality/factual
- Narrated by: Erik Thompson
- Countries of origin: United Kingdom; United States
- Original language: English
- No. of seasons: 1
- No. of episodes: 8

Production
- Executive producers: Sarah Swingler; Sanjay Singhal; Maria Baltazzi
- Producers: Luke Jackson; Rob Lambie; Tom Richardson; Ed Vanner
- Running time: 45 minutes
- Production companies: Dragonfly; GroupM Entertainment

Original release
- Network: Channel 5 Discovery Channel
- Release: January 6, 2012

Related
- Ice Road Truckers; Eddie Stobart: Trucks & Trailers

World's Toughest Trucker is a show produced by Dragonfly Productions and GroupM Entertainment. It is broadcast on Channel 5 in the United Kingdom and Discovery Channel in the US.

The show was originally commissioned by Channel 5 in the United Kingdom. The format is a co-production between Dragonfly and Group M Entertainment, and pits eight truck drivers against each other in a series of challenges. The winner receives US $150,000 and the title of "world’s toughest trucker".

It had its world premiere on 6 January 2012 on Channel 5. The show follows the success of Channel 5's other trucking programming such as Ice Road Truckers and Eddie Stobart: Trucks & Trailers. It is Broadcast on Friday at 8pm and regularly repeated. The show is filmed and broadcast in HD.

Channel 5 describes the show as "The world's most fearless truck drivers face off in some of the world's most feared locations." "In an exciting new series commencing on Channel 5 this week, eight of the world’s most experienced truck drivers go head to head in some of the harshest environments on planet Earth. Drawn from England, Scotland, Canada, USA, Sri Lanka and Australia, they are challenged to navigate the most extreme routes across that include Australia, Brazil, Canada, Mongolia and India. Each journey will last three days, and they must contend with unusual cargo, massive rigs, lethal roads and each other. Along the way, the weak will be eliminated and only one will walk away with the £100,000 prize and the title of ‘World’s Toughest Trucker'".

Over 60,000 people applied to take part in the show.

== Reception ==
The show has fared well in the UK, receiving the highest viewing figures for the night in some cases. All episodes made it into the top 30 of the week on the channel. The show has received positive reviews from viewers and is likely to be commissioned for a second series.

=== Ratings (UK overnight figures) ===
These figures do not take into consideration time shift viewing, on-demand catchup or online simulcast.

Episode	Date of broadcast	Rating
Episode 1	06/01/12	1.32 million
Episode 2	13/01/12	1.21 million
Episode 3	20/01/12	1.12 million
Episode 4	27/01/12	1.11 million
Episode 5	02/02/12	1.27 million
Episode 6	09/02/12	1.24 million
Episode 7	16/02/12	1.17 million
Episode 8	23/02/12	1.23 million
