= Nalneesh Neel =

Indian actor

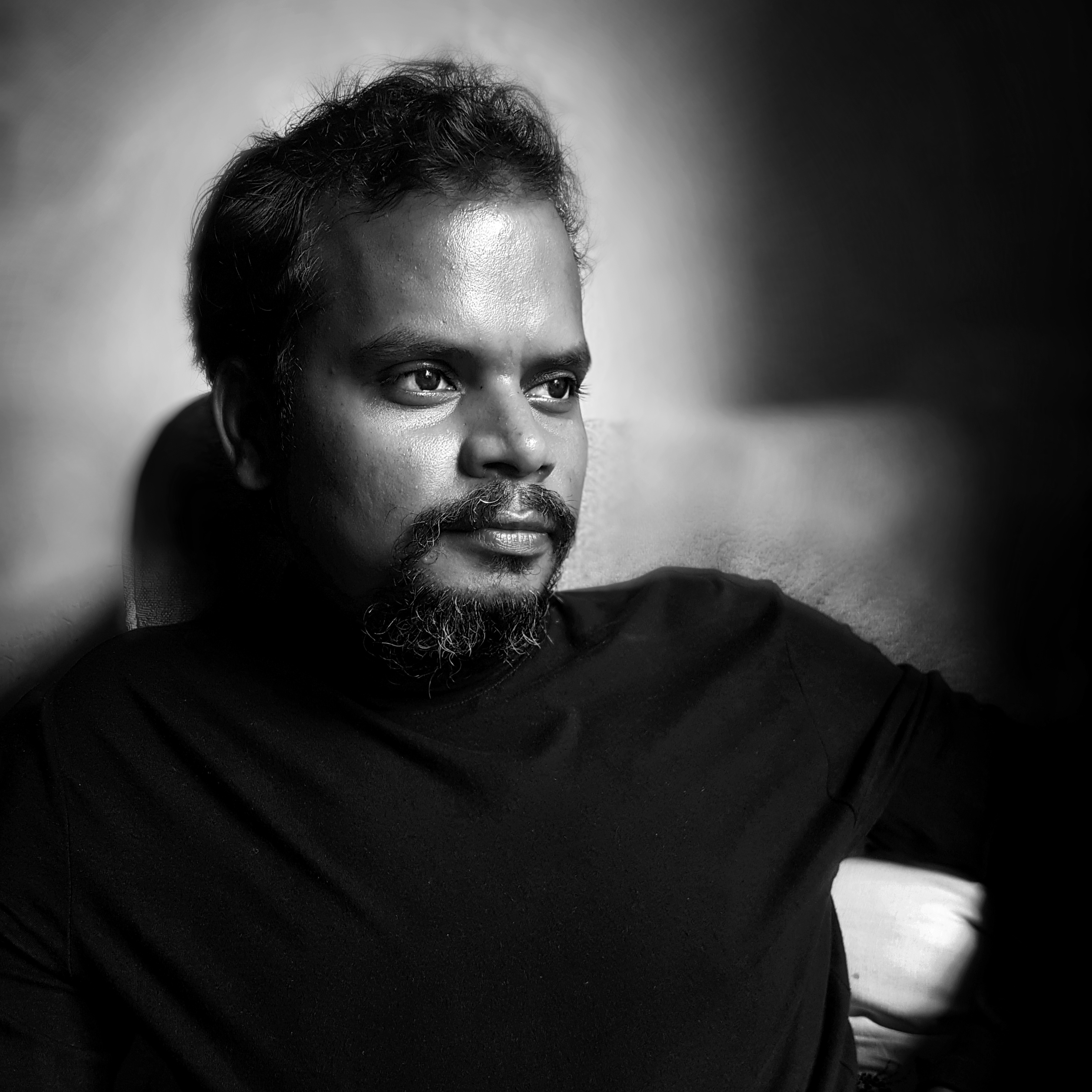
- Neel in 2021
- Born: 13 October 1984 (age 42); Bisalpur Pilibhit, Uttar Pradesh, India
- Education: Bharatendu Academy of Dramatic Arts, Lucknow
- Occupation: Actor
- Years active: 2010–present
- Known for: The White Tiger; III Smoking Barrels; Chhichhore; Gulabo Sitabo; Bhor; Fukrey Returns; Raees; Shuddh Desi Romance

Nalneesh Neel is an Indian actor who works in Hindi films. He is best known for his roles in The White Tiger, III Smoking Barrels, Chhichhore, Gulabo Sitabo, Bhor, Fukrey Returns, Raees, and Shuddh Desi Romance.

== Early life ==
Neel was born in Bisalpur Pilibhit, Uttar Pradesh. After completing his study he moved to Shahjahanpur, where he started doing theatre under the guidance of his mentor Dalip Anand. He played characters in several plays.

== Career ==
Neel has appeared in Bhor, Raees, Fukrey Returns, Shuddh Desi Romance, Chhichhore and Gulabo Sitabo. He won the Best Performance in the Negative Role at the Caleidoscope Indian Film Festival, Boston in 2020 for his role in the film Bhor. He made his Hollywood debut with The White Tiger directed by Ramin Bahrani. He was highly praised for playing the role of a vitiligo lips in the film.

Neel has acted in various short films including The Foreigner, Acche Din and Umeed.

Neel appeared in various advertising campaigns concerning the Indian economy: Prem Ratan Dhan Payo, 5rs ki maut, The case video Must Go On and the NGO advertisement No to Violence, Yes to Love. and commercials including SAMCO Kisan Pipe and Cello Pen Maxtreme.

Neel regularly performs in the theater under his own production SRS Entertainment. He is currently performing in the short solo play Ek Haseena Paanch Diwane based on Harishankar Parsai's story.

== Filmography ==
=== Film ===
Year	Film	Role	Language	Ref.
2013	Shudh Desi Romance	Tara's suitor	Hindi	
2016	Acche Din	Abhishek	Hindi	
2017	Raees	Lalji	Hindi	
2017	Fukrey Returns	Mangu	Hindi	
2017	The Foreigner	Plumber	Hindi	
2018	III Smoking Barrels	Ikram	Multilingual	
2019	Manikarnika	Teer Singh	Hindi	
2019	Chhichhore	Pandu	Hindi	
2020	Sab Kushal Mangal	Haricharan	Hindi	
2020	Gulabo Sitabo	Sheikhu	Hindi	
2021	The White Tiger	Vitiligo	Hindi, English	
2021	Bhor	Chamku	Hindi	
2023	Kannur Squad	Bambiha	Malayalam	
2023	The Tenant	Kamble	Hindi	
2025	Bhool Chuk Maaf	Tailor	Hindi	
2025	Son of Sardar 2	Keshav	Hindi	

== Awards and nominations ==
Neel won Critic's Choice Best Actor (Male) for his role in Achchhe Din at Acharya Tulsi Short Film Festival in Mumbai.

In 2020, Nalneesh Neel won the award for Best Performance in A Negative his character of Chamku in the film Bhor at the Caleidoscope Indian Film Festival of Boston.
