= Kamakhya Narayan Singh =

Indian film director and screenwriter (born 1984)

- Born: 9 September 1984 (age 42); Guwahati, Assam, India
- Occupations: Film director; producer; screenwriter
- Spouse: Priyanka
- Children: 1

Kamakhya Narayan Singh (born 9 September 1984) is an Indian film director and screenwriter who works in Hindi cinema.

He is best known for his film Bhor (2021), released on MX Player, which went to 28 film festivals, mostly in India. He is also known for his documentaries #Article 35A (2017) and Justice Delayed but Delivered (2020), and for his works like Quest, a TV series documentary and Music Ka Tadka a music television show.

He won the National Film Award for Best Film on Other Social Issues for Justice Delayed but Delivered.

== Filmography ==
=== Film ===
Year	Title	Director	Producer	Writer	Notes
2017	#Article 35A	Yes	No	Yes	Documentary; Short film
2017	Off The Grid	Yes	No	Yes	Documentary; Short film
2020	Ten Days South Africa	Yes	No	Yes	Documentary; Short film
2020	Justice Delayed but Delivered	Yes	No	No	Documentary; Short film
2021	Bhor	Yes	No	No	Feature film
2026	The Kerala Story 2: Goes Beyond	Yes	No	No	Feature film

=== Television ===
Title	Director	Producer	Writer	Notes
Quest	Yes	No	No	Documentary television series
Music Ka Tadka	Yes	No	No	Music television show

== Awards and nominations ==
Year	Award	Category	Nominated work	Result	Ref(s)
2020	National Film Awards	Best Film on Other Social Issues	Justice Delayed but Delivered	Won	
