= Kamakhya, A Socio-Cultural Study =

2004 book by Nihar Ranjan Mishra

Kamakhya A Socio-Cultural Study
- The cover page of the book
- Author: Nihar Ranjan Mishra
- Language: English
- Series: Reconstructing Indian history & culture, no. 28
- Publisher: D. K. Printworld (P) Ltd
- Publication date: 2004
- Publication place: Assam, India
- Media type: Print (Hardcover)
- Pages: 220
- ISBN: 81-246-0251-4

Kamakhya, A Socio-Cultural Study is a comprehensive book on the Kamakhya temple complex in Guwahati, Assam. The book is authored by Nihar Ranjan Mishra and published by D. K. Printworld Pvt Ltd in 2004. The book makes a detailed study of the temple rituals, festivals and personnel and socio-cultural life and includes an account on spread of Saktism in the region.
