= Horn OK Please (song) =

Single by Honey Singh, Sukhwinder Singh, Anushka Manchanda

from the album Dedh Ishqiya
- Released: 24 December 2013
- Recorded: 2012–2013; Studio Satya, Mumbai
- Genre: Filmi; Pop; Hip Hop
- Length: 4:38
- Label: Shemaroo Entertainment Audio
- Songwriters: Gulzar, Vishal Bhardwaj
- Producers: Vishal Bhardwaj; Shemaroo Entertainment Audio

"Horn OK Please" is the fifth single released from the soundtrack of the Dedh Ishqiya. The song is composed by Vishal Bhardwaj, the composer and co-producer of the film with the lyrics written by long-term collaborator Gulzar, performed by Yo! Yo! Honey Singh, Sukhwinder Singh and with backing vocals by Anushka Manchanda. The single has a theme of Babban searching for Khalujaan after separation being explored. (Note: Babban and Khalujaan refers to the characters played by Arshad Warsi and Naseeruddin Shah in the film respectively.)

The song marks the first time collaboration of Gulzar with Honey Singh, who voices Warsi.

== Development ==
At first when Honey Singh was approached by Vishal Bhardwaj over telephone he considered it to be a prank call. His belief consolidated when he was asked to rap on verses written by Gulzar. After verifying the entire incident he set aside all his prior commitments and travelled to Mumbai to meet Bhardwaj at the earliest.

== Composition and recording ==
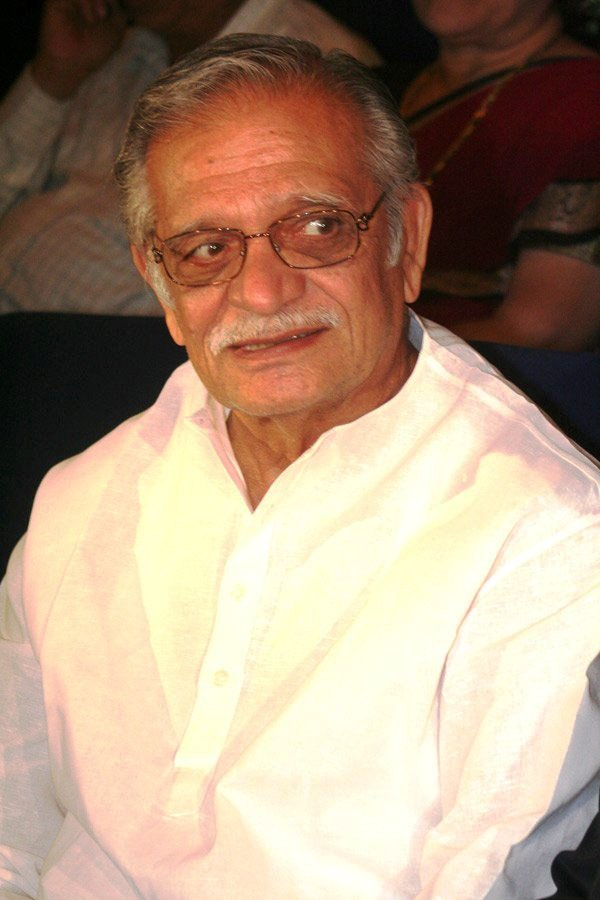
This song marks first collaboration between Gulzar (pictured) and Honey Singh.

The song has its lyrics written by veteran lyricist and poet Gulzar including the rap verse sung by Honey Singh. The idea of Honey Singhs inclusion in the song was Vishal Bhardwajs who thought his voice would be fit for Warsi's character. It is the first time Gulzar has written a song's rap verses also the first time Singh rapped to one not written by him. Gulzar included one line of the rap verse, "Tere Bina Zindagi Se Koi Shiqwa Toh Nahin" from the song of the same name from the film Aandhi. According to Singh, it is a "lovely composition" and was a "fun, crazy experience" for him. Sukhwinder Singh who voiced the character of Naseeruddin Shah in the single considered the collaboration of Singh, Gulzar's lyrics and Bhardwaj's composition to be a "good cocktail". For the single, Singh was asked to rap in a Bhopali accent that Warsi's character, Babban has in both the films. Bhardwaj did three recordings with Singh with the last one being the final one. The song has a feel particular to that found in North Indian states like Delhi and Uttar Pradesh with Singh describing it as "zany crazy piece of writing". Bhardwaj said that he did not include Singh for monetary purposes contrary to popular belief that Singh is a commercial rapper who has delivered hits like Lungi Dance.

== Music video ==
Throughout the video the constant theme of Babban searching for Khalu is prevalent and explored thus according to producer Mansi Maroo, different types of transportation was used including a camel.

The music video for the single begins at a point with Babban (Arshad Warsi) while travelling by-road, reminiscing about happier times he spent with his uncle, Kalujaan during the course of events from the previous film. He then tries to hitch a ride failing multiple times before using his gun to rob a car, a Chevrolet. In the next scene, Khalujaan appears entering the premises of a run-down palace in an old indigo Fiat wearing a black Kurta along with sunglasses. While Khalujaan appears giving speeches, participating in bird shooting competitions against Jaan Mohammad (Vijay Raaz) and wooing Begum Para (Madhuri Dixit) Babban on the other hand is still travelling taking several rides on the way, from Ford Endeavour, camel ride to a bike. Meanwhile Babban is detained by police to inquire about a jewellery robbery, both of them had committed but gets released after they find out that the jewellery is in Khalujaan's possession. Babban discovering that Khalujaan has double-crossed him and fled with the loot sets out to seek revenge thus explaining the journey scenes after failing to locate it in the place he hid it. Khalujaan after finishing his speech is terrified to see Babban in the audience who aims his gun at him concluding the video.

== Release ==
The teaser of the single was released on Shemaroo Entertainments official YouTube channel on 25 December 2013 with the full video being release on the next day. The song, the fifth single from the soundtrack succeeding Hamari Atariya Pe, Dil Ka Mizaah Ishqiya, Jagaave Saari Raina and Zabaan Jale Hai was released on the digital music platform iTunes on 24 December 2013.

=== Critical reception ===
Atish Chandra reviewing for Hindustan Times stated it to be a "peppy number", praising Singh's rap verse. Bryan Durham for The Times of India categorises it as one which tries to "cater to both Honey Singh " and those who "swear by the Bhardwaj-Gulzar combine"[sic].

Rajiv Vijayakar stated it to be "passable track" praising the lyrics, feel and the composition of the single.

== Chart performance ==
The single debuted at No. 14 in The Times of India and Radio Mirchi Top 20 charts.

== Track listing ==
- Digital download
1. "Horn OK Please" – 4:38
