= Dedh Ishqiya =

2014 film by Abhishek Chaubey

- Theatrical release poster
- Directed by: Abhishek Chaubey
- Screenplay by: Vishal Bhardwaj; Abhishek Chaubey; Gulzar
- Dialogues by: Vishal Bhardwaj
- Story by: Darab Farooqui
- Produced by: Raman Maroo; Vishal Bhardwaj
- Starring: Naseeruddin Shah; Madhuri Dixit; Arshad Warsi; Huma Qureshi
- Cinematography: Satyajit Pande (Setu)
- Edited by: A. Sreekar Prasad
- Music by: Songs: Vishal Bhardwaj; Background Score: Clinton Cerejo
- Production companies: VB Pictures; Shemaroo Entertainment
- Distributed by: Shemaroo Entertainment
- Release date: 10 January 2014
- Running time: 148 minutes
- Country: India
- Language: Hindi
- Budget: ₹ 370 million
- Box office: ₹ 408 million

Dedh Ishqiya (transl. One and a half passionate) is a 2014 Indian slapstick black comedy film directed by Abhishek Chaubey and starring Arshad Warsi, Naseeruddin Shah, Madhuri Dixit, Huma Qureshi and Vijay Raaz. Produced by Raman Maroo of Shemaroo Entertainment and by Vishal Bharadwaj, it is a standalone sequel to Ishqiya (2010).

Dedh Ishqiya was released worldwide on 10 January 2014, and proved to be a commercial failure at the box office. It received positive reviews from critics upon release. At the 60th Filmfare Awards, Dedh Ishqiya received 5 nominations, including Best Actress (Dixit) and Best Female Playback Singer (Rekha Bhardwaj for "Hamari Atariya Pe").

== Plot ==
Khaalujaan (Naseeruddin Shah) and his nephew Babban (Arshad Warsi), who are partners in crime, pose as a Nawab and his attendant, and manage to run away with a prized necklace from a jewellery shop. During the police chase, they get separated; Babban escapes, Khalujaan is injured, and the necklace seemingly lost. Babban goes to meet his boss Mushtaq Bhai (Salman Shahid), who disbelieves him, accuses him of double-crossing his boss in cahoots with his uncle Khaalujaan, gives him a death sentence, and orders him to dig his own grave. Babban duly begins to dig a grave under supervision, but manages to escape, with the promise that he will bring back both the necklace and Khaalujaan.

Months later, Babban comes across Khalujaan, who is posing as a Nawab and attending a poetry contest. It is a mushaira (gathering of poets) organised by Begum Para (Madhuri Dixit), the widowed Begum of Najibabad, supposedly in compliance with the wishes of her deceased husband. The winner of the poetry contest will not only win the widowed Begum as his bride, but also become the Nawab of Najibabad.

Babban confronts Khalujaan on the opening night of the contest, and tries to get him to return with him. However, Babban himself delays departure after falling in love at first sight with Muniya (Huma Qureshi), Begum Para's beautiful maid and constant companion. Meanwhile, Khalujaan has his task cut out for him—he needs to fool the gathering into accepting him as an aristocrat, win the poetry contest if possible, and seduce the Begum. One of the other contestants is a local politician and gangster named Jaan Mohammed (Vijay Raaz), who is holding the poet Nawab Italwi (Manoj Pahwa) in captivity, forcing him to write poetry for Jaan to recite at the contest. The contest proceeds; while Khalujaan has his heart set on Begum Para herself, Babban is smitten with Muniya. Khalujaan tries to impress the Begum by gifting her the prized necklace which he had stolen earlier, but on the final day, Begum declares Jaan Mohammed to be the victor. She declares that she will marry Jaan Mohammad and that he will become the new Nawab of Najibabad

Since the necklace has clearly failed to move the Begum, Khaalujaan decides to see if a gun will serve the purpose better. However, even as he approaches the Begum brandishing his chosen instrument of persuasion, he finds the dowager being hustled away at gunpoint by a masked man. Khalujaan chases them and blocks their way only to discover that the masked man is none other than his nephew Babban. It turns out that the Begum had plotted her own kidnapping in order to extort money from the nawab-elect (Jaan Mohammad). More twists are then revealed: the Begum was nothing but a dancing-girl (tawaif) who had seduced a middle-aged nawab and married him, only to find that the nawab was actually a pauper who supported his lavish way of life by selling his inherited properties and jewels. He also neglected his wife, who (it is very strongly suggested) developed a relationship of intimacy with a sympathetic maidservant, Muniya.

By the time the nawab died of good living, he had become completely bankrupt and even his palace had been mortgaged to the moneylenders. After his death, the penniless Begum had been helped financially and courted actively by Jaan Mohammad, who was besotted with her. He also wanted the title and status of being the "Nawab of Najibabad." If a mere dancing-girl could marry an aging nawab and swan around being feted and fawned over as Begum of Majidabad, then Jaan Mohammad, of a similar social background, could likewise climb into the same status by marrying the same girl, now a dowager. The Begum was appalled by this idea. Jaan Mohammad is a man of low birth and uncultured mannerisms, a former street-thug turned politician, with an entourage of sycophantic hoodlums. The idea of marrying such a man was repellent to the Begum, who was anyway in love with her maid-servant. Yet, Jaan Mohammad's debt and his persistence leave the Begum with no choice but to announce a competition for her suitors, as a tactic to delay responding to Jaan's advances.

Thus, the mushaira was conceived as an elaborate hoax: the late Nawab had never wanted his widow to marry someone else, much less that the winner should be recognized as "Nawab of Majidabad." It was the Begum's own idea, the purpose being to snare a rich man and marry him. The Begum did not want to marry Jaan Mohammad, but she wanted his money, therefore she was staging a kidnapping in order to receive a ransom from Jaan Mohammad. She has employed Babban to act as her kidnapper and extort a hefty ransom from Jaan Mohammad, who was expected to pay up because otherwise he would never fulfil his dream of becoming a Nawab.

Babban duly phones Jaan Mohammed (who is by now aware of the Begum's cunning plan) to bring a ransom of Rs. 100 million (100 million rupees, about $2 million in 2014) in cash to the railway station. All four of them (Begum, maid, and the uncle-nephew duo) reach the railway station to collect the money, but find that they are surrounded by Jaan Mohammad's goons. To their good fortune, Nawab Italwi arrives with a police force and cross-firing ensues. Begum and Muniya escape from the situation, leaving Babban and Khalujaan behind to be arrested.

Two months later, the uncle-nephew duo get bail and, as they leave the jail, they are given a letter from Begum and Muniya. It is a cheeky letter of thanks and goodbye from the women, informing the men that they have sold the priceless necklace and used the proceeds to buy a house and settle down in a faraway town whose name they withhold. Uncle and nephew are now exactly at the same situation where they were at the start of all these shenanigans—the movie ends with the duo once again surrounded by Mushtaq Bhai and his gang.

== Cast ==
- Naseeruddin Shah as Ifthekhar Hussain alias Khalujan / Nawab Chandpur
- Madhuri Dixit as Begum Para
- Arshad Warsi as Razzaq Hussain alias Babban
- Huma Qureshi as Muneera Aslam Zia-ul-Banu
- Vijay Raaz as Jaan Mohammad
- Bhuvan Arora as Young Khalu
- Manoj Pahwa as Nawab Noor Mohammad Italwi
- Ravi Gossain as Liyaakat ali
- Salman Shahid as Mushtak Bhai
- John Vijay as Police Officer

== Production ==
=== Casting ===
At a private party held in Mumbai, Shemaroo Entertainment and Vishal Bhardwaj, who had previously produced Ishqiya (2010), announced the sequel with the same cast and crew. It was later announced that Vidya Balan, the heroine of Ishqiya, would not feature in the sequel. In April 2012, Madhuri Dixit signed on to play the role of Begum Para, the grey character at the centre of the film; it was Dixit's first role after moving back to India from the US in November 2011. The two male leads Naseeruddin Shah and Arshad Warsi were retained from the original. The role of supporting actress first was offered to Asin Thottumkal but, she refused to work in a supporting role, and she said in one interview that she thought that the role is not very attractive and therefore she rejected it. Kangana Ranaut then signed Dedh Ishqiya and said she was going to start shooting soon. However, in December 2012 she was dropped, supposedly due to persistent date issues. She was replaced by Huma Qureshi. Arshad Warsi stated that he was paired with Huma and Madhuri was paired opposite Naseeruddin Shah.

=== Filming ===
The shooting was initially scheduled to start in September 2012, but was shifted to November, and was further postponed even at that time, due to issues related to Kangana Ranaut's desire for an expansion of her role. Shooting finally began on 27 February 2013, after she was replaced with Huma Qureshi. Mahmudabad palace near Barabanki was spruced up for the shoot. The "First Look" of the film was released on 25 October 2013 and the trailer was released on 8 November 2013.

Madhuri Dixit performed a mujra to the song Apne Karar Mein. The dance was choreographed by Pandit Birju Maharaj.

== Soundtrack ==
The music of the film was composed by Vishal Bhardwaj, and the lyrics of all the songs have been written by Gulzar. The song "Hamari Atariya" was originally sung by Begum Akhtar in the 1950s, and a new version was recorded with the voice of Rekha Bharadwaj. It was released first as a single on 3 December 2013. The second single "Dil Ka Mizaaj Ishqiya" sung by Rahat Fateh Ali Khan was released on 13 December 2013 and the third single track "Horn OK Please" which sung by Honey Singh, Sukhwinder Singh and Anushka Manchanda was released on 24 December 2013.

The full audio album was unveiled by Shemaroo Entertainment Audios on 19 December 2013.

== Critical reception ==
Anupama Chopra, the Hindustan Times movie critic said, "Dedh Ishqiya is worth watching just for Abhishek Chaubey's ambition. He is not constrained by the demands of the box office." Giving it 5 out of 5 stars, Rediff India's movie critic Raja Sen called Dedh Ishqiya a genuinely smart film.

Taran Adarsh from Bollywood Hungama also gave positive review, Ishqiya was sharp, spicy and volatile, with impulsive characters and a storyline taking a somersault every few minutes. Dedh Ishqiya is no different. It transports you to a diverse world, but like the first part, this one focuses on love and deceit as well. Also, it's far more complex this time around and the truth hits you like a ton of bricks!

Deepanjana Pal from Firstpost praised director Chaubey the most, saying: "Chaubey is two films old and compared to Ishqiya, Dedh Ishqiya is far more elaborate, complicated and ambitious. Like a skipping stone, the film touches upon a variety of genres – action, comedy, romance, social critique – and Chaubey handles them deftly".

In a review for Firstpost Mihir Fadnavis praised Dedh Ishqiya for its writing, direction, performances, humour and use of Urdu poetry. He thought the film was better than the one and called it one of the funniest thrillers, in Bollywood.

There was a few negative reviews as well. Martin D'Souza from Glamsham Editorial gave the film a negative review and a score of 2/5, stating that the film opens on the wrong foot and moves at a very languid pace.

== Box office ==
Made on a budget of around ₹ 370 million including promotions and marketings, Dedh Ishqiya managed to recover ₹ 408 million from the box office. It was considered commercially successful.

Dedh Ishqiya opened with average occupancy, even though it was released on less than 1200 screens. It collected ₹30 million (US$310,000) (30 million) on its opening day. The film grossed around ₹115 million (US$1.2 million) (115 million) during its first weekend. Dedh Ishqiya collected around ₹17.5 million (US$180,000) nett on first Monday taking its four-day total to ₹133 million (US$1.4 million). Overseas collection of Dedh Ishqiya was around $525,000 in first weekend.

In the second week, Dedh Ishqiya had a dull performance, earning just ₹40.0 million (US$420,000) in the weekend and ₹65 million (US$670,000) between Monday and Wednesday in the domestic box office. Its performance overseas was even more dismal, bringing in ₹15 million (US$160,000) (15 million) over the week, making for a worldwide grand total of ₹316 million (US$3.3 million) (316 million) in two weeks. This effectively ended the theatrical run of the film, because in the third week, Dedh Ishqiya lost almost all its screens to Jai Ho.

== Accolades ==
Award	Date of ceremony (Note: Date is linked to the article about the awards held that year, wherever possible.)	Category	Recipient(s)	Result	Ref.
BIG Star Entertainment Awards	18 December 2014	Most Entertaining Thriller Film	Abhishek Chaubey, Raman Maroo and Vishal Bhardwaj	Nominated	
BIG Star Entertainment Awards	18 December 2014	Most Entertaining Actor in a Thriller Film – Male	Arshad Warsi	Nominated	
BIG Star Entertainment Awards	18 December 2014	Most Entertaining Actor in a Comedy Film – Male	Arshad Warsi	Nominated	
BIG Star Entertainment Awards	18 December 2014	Most Entertaining Actor in a Thriller Film – Female	Huma Qureshi	Nominated	
BIG Star Entertainment Awards	18 December 2014	Most Entertaining Actor in a Thriller Film – Female	Madhuri Dixit	Nominated	
Filmfare Awards	31 January 2015	Best Actress	Madhuri Dixit	Nominated	
Filmfare Awards	31 January 2015	Best Female Playback Singer	Rekha Bhardwaj (for "Hamari Atariya Pe")	Nominated	
Filmfare Awards	31 January 2015	Best Dialogue	Vishal Bhardwaj	Nominated	
Filmfare Awards	31 January 2015	Best Production Design	Subrata Chakraborty and Amit Ray	Nominated	
Filmfare Awards	31 January 2015	Best Costume Design	Payal Saluja	Nominated	
International Indian Film Academy Awards	5–7 June 2015	Best Supporting Actress	Huma Qureshi	Nominated	
Producers Guild Film Awards	11 January 2015	Best Actress in a Supporting Role	Huma Qureshi	Nominated	
Producers Guild Film Awards	11 January 2015	Best Cinematography	Satyajit Pande (SETU)	Won	
Producers Guild Film Awards	11 January 2015	Best Art Direction	Subrata Chakraborty and Amit Ray	Won	
Producers Guild Film Awards	11 January 2015	Best Costume Design	Payal Saluja	Won	
Producers Guild Film Awards	11 January 2015	Best Choreography	Birju Maharaj (for "Jagave Saari Raina")	Nominated	
Screen Awards	14 January 2015	Best Ensemble Cast	Dedh Ishqiya	Nominated	
Screen Awards	14 January 2015	Best Actor in a Negative Role – Male	Vijay Raaz	Nominated	
Screen Awards	14 January 2015	Best Actor in a Negative Role – Female	Huma Qureshi	Won	
Screen Awards	14 January 2015	Best Actor in a Negative Role – Female	Madhuri Dixit	Nominated	
Screen Awards	14 January 2015	Best Female Playback Singer	Rekha Bhardwaj (for "Hamari Atariya Pe")	Nominated	
Stardust Awards	14 December 2014	Best Actor in a Drama	Naseeruddin Shah	Nominated	
Stardust Awards	14 December 2014	Best Actress in a Drama	Madhuri Dixit	Nominated	
		Breakthrough Performance – Female	Huma Qureshi	Won	
