= Anushka Manchanda =

Indian musical artist (born 1984)

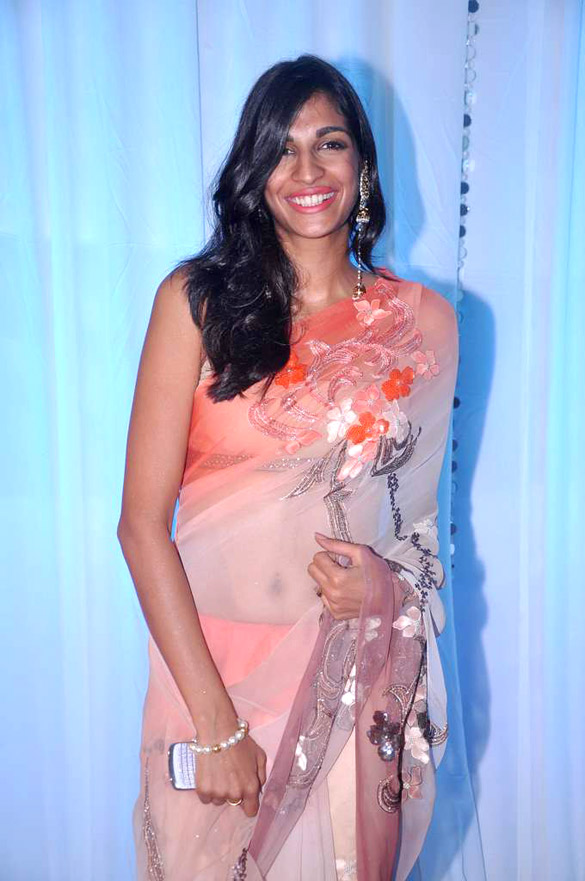

Background information
- Also known as: Kiss Nuka
- Born: 11 February 1984 (age 42); Delhi, India
- Genres: Bass, Experimental, Electronic, Spiritual
- Occupations: Music Producer, Singer-Songwriter, Director, Editor, Entrepreneur, Actor
- Instruments: Piano, Guitar
- Years active: 2002–2017
- Labels: Universal, Sony Music, IncInk, T-Series, EROS, Tips, SaReGaMa, Venus
- Website: anushkamanchanda.com kissnuka.com

Anushka Manchanda aka Kiss Nuka (born 11 February 1984) is an Indian singer, music producer, composer, actress, and former VJ. She came to prominence as a member of the Indipop girl group Viva!. In 2018, she adopted the artistic name Kiss Nuka.

== Career ==
=== Viva (2002–2004) ===
When Manchanda participated on the show Coke [V] Pop stars, she was trained under the likes of Manish Malhotra, Bosco–Caesar, Shiamak Davar, and Noyonika Chatterjee. The five winners of the talent show formed a band named 'Viva' and the series became one of the highest TRP reality shows on television. As a member of Viva, she worked with Javed Akhtar, Salim–Sulaiman, Shankar Ehsan Loy, Sandeep Chowta, Raju Singh, Shantanu Moitra, and Ashu Dhruv.

Their first album sold went platinum. 60,000 people attended their first concert.

For the second album of Viva, Viva Reloaded, Manchanda composed a track on the piano. The song was 'Yeh Pyar Nahi Toh Kya Hain' to which the lyrics were written by band member Neha Bhasin and Manchanda.

=== Channel V (2004–2006) ===
After Viva's second album, Manchanda started working as a VJ on Channel V. She hosted a travel show called V on The Run with Purab Kohli and Sarah Jane Dias where they traveled around India. She hosted shows like Launchpad, Hotline, and Jukebox. Manchanda left Channel V in 2006 after the show ended, but returned for the V Ad Awards.

=== Playback singing ===
Manchanda started playback singing in the Tamil film industry with the song "O Mahire" from the 2004 film Manmadhan under the direction of noted music composer Yuvan Shankar Raja. She later worked several times with him on popular songs like "Thee Pidikka" (Arinthum Ariyamalum), "Kudakooli" (Kalvanin Kadhali), "Money Money" (Thimiru) and "Oh..Oh..Ennanamo" (Chennai 600028). In 2006, she got her first opportunity to sing for a Hindi film, which was the title song of the film Golmaal, composed by Vishal–Shekhar. This was followed by several other songs under other noted music composers such as Anu Malik, Salim–Sulaiman, Pritam, and Shankar–Ehsaan–Loy. She performed a cameo role in the Bollywood film Dulha Mil Gaya, for which she sung three songs as well. Manchanda has also appeared the reality show MTV Pulsar Stunt Mania in 2010. In Bollywood, Manchanda's rendition of the song "Dum Maro Dum" in the film Dum Maro Dum gained immense popularity. She also sang "Ek Main Hun Aur Ek Tu" from the film Ek Main Aur Ekk Tu, "Apna Har Din Aise Jiyo" in Golmaal 3. In 2013, she sang the remix version of the 1991 hit song (originally sung by Kavita Krishnamurthy in the film Chalbaaz) "Na jaane kahan se aya hai", featuring Neeraj Shridhar.

=== Acting ===
Manchanda featured on the track I am Sorry by Akcent, which received high critical acclaim and collaborated with producer Chicane.

Manchanda is one of the lead actors in Angry Indian Goddesses, a film by award-winning director Pan Nalin (Samsara).

=== As independent artist ===
After establishing a career in film, Manchanda formed an electro-pop group in 2012, collaborating with members from various backgrounds, including Shiraz Bhattacharya and Abhijit Nalani. The band released the track "Crazy" and toured but disbanded two years later.

Manchanda launched her alter ego, Kiss Nuka, in 2018 with the electro-pop song "Don't Be Afraid." The accompanying music video was recognized as one of the top 10 music videos of 2018 by Rolling Stone and Homegrown and won awards for Best Concept and Best Direction at the 17th Independent Music Awards. In November 2020, she released "Kashmir," featuring Khalid Ahmed and Sufiyan Malik.

== Awards ==
- Zee Cine Award for Best Playback Singer Female for Dum Maaro Dum (2012)
- GIMA Award for Best Pop Album for Kiss Nuka (2018)
- Best Concept and Best Director at the Independent Music Awards for Don’t Be Afraid (2020)
- Best Female Artist at the Ola Music Awards (2021)

== Personal life ==
Manchanda is the daughter of former Indian cricketer Rajesh Manchanda and artist, Dr. Anita Manchanda. She has a brother, Shikhar Yuvraj. She was raised in Delhi and attended Lady Shri Ram College for Women. She started singing at the age of 6 and won a talent show at the age of 9.

Manchanda is a fitness enthusiast and supports fitness and health awareness and practices yoga and nutrition.

== Filmography ==
Fims
Year	Title	Role	Notes
2010	Dulha Mil Gaya	Shyla	Cameo Appearance
2015	Angry India Goddesses	Madhureeta	

Television
Year	Title	Role	Notes
2002	Coke [V] Popstars	Herself	Singing Reality Show
-	MTV Pulsar Stuntmania Season 2	Herself (Host)	Reality Show
-	On The Run	Herself	Travel Show
2007	Loins of Punjab Presents	Herself	Judge
2009	Fear Factor: Khatron Ke Khiladi	Herself (Winner)	Reality Stunt-based Show
2010–11	Jhalak Dikhhla Jaa	Herself (Contestant)	Reality Dancing Show
2016	Comedy Nights Bachao	Herself (Contestant)	Comedy Show

== Discography ==
=== Film songs ===
Year	Song	Album	Language	Composer	Notes
2004	"Oh Mahirae"	Manmadhan	Tamil	Yuvan Shankar Raja	
2004	"Qiero"	Rakht	Hindi	Anand–Milind	With Pratichi as part of "Viva"
2005	"Theepidika Theepidika"	Arinthum Ariyamalum	Tamil	Yuvan Shankar Raja	
2005	"Kudakkooli Koduthachu"	Kalvanin Kadhali.	Tamil	Yuvan Shankar Raja	
2005	"Mila Mila"	Super	Telugu	Sandeep Chowta	
2005	"Hey babu"	Devadasu	Telugu	Chakri	
2006	"Bylaa Bylamo"	Sainikudu	Telugu	Harris Jayaraj	
2006	"Golmaal"	Golmaal	Hindi	Vishal–Shekhar	
2006	"Money Money"	Thimiru	Tamil	Yuvan Shankar Raja	
2006	"Zindaggi Rocks"	Zindaggi Rocks	Hindi	Anu Malik	
2006	"Manmatha Neenena"	Aishwarya	Kannada	Rajesh Ramanath	
2007	"Oh..Oh..Ennanamo"	Chennai 600028	Tamil	Yuvan Shankar Raja	
2007	"Naughty Naughty"	Cash	Hindi	Vishal–Shekhar	Winner, Stardust New Musical Sensation (Female) Award
2007	"Rathraina"	Athidi	Telugu	Manisharma	
2007	"Cheli cheruku"	Aadavari Matalaku Ardhalu Verule	Telugu	Yuvan Shankar Raja	
2007	"Chammakuro Challa"	Munna	Telugu	Harris Jayaraj	
2008	"Tu Saala"	Golmaal Returns	Hindi	Pritam	
2009	"Chandni Chowk to China"	Chandni Chowk to China	Hindi	Shankar–Ehsaan–Loy	
2009	"Oh Sexy Mama"	Yavarum Nalam	Tamil	Shankar–Ehsaan–Loy	
2009	"Oh Sexy Mama (Hindi)"	13B	Hindi	Shankar–Ehsaan–Loy	
2009	"Akira Kurosawa"	Chintu Ji	Hindi		
2009	"Dil Kalase"	Kick	Telugu	S.Thaman	
2010	"Alisha"	Pyaar Impossible!	Hindi	Salim–Sulaiman	
2010	"10 on 10"	Pyaar Impossible!	Hindi	Salim–Sulaiman	
2010	"Life Is A Game (Hindi Version)"	Teen Patti	Hindi	Salim–Sulaiman	
2010	"Life Is A Game (English Version)"	Teen Patti	English	Salim–Sulaiman	
2010	"By The Way"	Aisha	Hindi	Amit Trivedi	
2010	"Behke Behke"	Aisha	Hindi	Amit Trivedi	
2010	"Dil Khol Ke Let's Rock"	We Are Family	Hindi	Shankar–Ehsaan–Loy	
2010	"Apna Har Din"	Golmaal 3	Hindi	Pritam	
2010	"Go Go Golmaal"	Golmaal 3	Hindi	Pritam	
2010	"Dhatad Tatad"	Lafangey Parindey	Hindi	R. Anandh	
2011	"Mit Jaaye Gum (Dum Maaro Dum)"	Dum Maaro Dum	Hindi	Pritam	
2011	"Piya Kesariyo"	Hum Tum Shabana	Hindi	Sachin–Jigar	
2012	"Ek Main Aur Ekk Tu"	Ek Main Aur Ekk Tu	Hindi	Amit Trivedi	
2013	"Allah Duhai Hai"	Race 2	Hindi	Pritam	
2013	"Dil Na Jaane Kyun"	Jayantabhai Ki Luv Story	Hindi	Sachin–Jigar	
2013	"Mann Basiyo Sanwariyo"	ABCD – Any Body Can Dance	Hindi	Sachin–Jigar	
2013	"Rowdy Fellows"	D for Dopidi	Telugu	Mahesh Shankar	
2013	"Na Jaane"	I, Me Aur Main	Hindi	Sachin–Jigar	
2014	"Horn OK Please"	Dedh Ishqiya	Hindi	Vishal Bhardwaj	
2014	"Teri Mahima Aprampar"	Entertainment	Hindi	Sachin–Jigar	
2014	"Lucky Tu Lucky Me"	Humpty Sharma Ki Dulhania	Hindi	Sachin–Jigar	
2014	"Dance Basanti"	Ungli	Hindi	Sachin–Jigar	
2015	"Bezubaan Phir Se"	ABCD 2	Hindi	Sachin–Jigar	
2015	"Manma Emotion Jaage"	Dilwale	Hindi	Pritam	
2015	"Zindagi"	Angry Indian Goddesses	Hindi	Anushka Manchanda	
2016	"Tu Hai Toh Main Hoon"	Waiting	Hindi	Mickey McCleary	
2016	"Waiting For You"	Waiting	Hindi	Mickey McCleary	
2017	"Aate Jaate Hanste Gaate"	Golmaal Again	Hindi	Abhishek Arora	

=== Non-film songs ===
Year	Album	Song	Language	Composers	Notes
2002	Viva!	All songs	Hindi	Leslee Lewis, Salim-Sulaiman, Sandeep Chowta, Shankar-Ehsaan-Loy, Raju Singh	Debut album
2003	Viva! Reloaded	All songs	Hindi	Leslee Lewis, Salim-Sulaiman, Sandeep Chowta, Shankar-Ehsaan-Loy, Raju Singh	Second album
2015	"Superfly"	Superfly	English	Anish Sood, Nanok	
2016	"Don't Hold Back - Feat Ranveer Singh"	Jack & Jones	Hindi	Anushka Manchanda	
2017	"ZEE5"	ZEE5 ANTHEM!	Hindi	Amit Trivedi	
