= Commando (film series) =

Indian Hindi language film series

- Directed by: Dilip Ghosh; Deven Bhojani; Aditya Datt
- Written by: Ritesh Shah; Darius Yarmil; Junaid Wasi
- Story by: Suresh Nair
- Produced by: Vipul Amrutlal Shah; Suniel Shetty; Dhaval Jayantilal Gada; Popcorn Motion Pictures
- Starring: See Cast
- Cinematography: Sejal Shah; Chirantan Das; Mark Hamilton
- Edited by: Amitabh Shukla; Sanjay Sharma; Sandeep Kurup
- Music by: Songs: Mannan Shaah; Gourov Roshin; Vikram Montrose; Score: Prasad Sasthe; Saurabh Bhalerao
- Production company: Sunshine Pictures; Reliance Entertainment; Pen India Limited; Motion Picture Capital
- Distributed by: Reliance Entertainment
- Release dates: 12 April 2013 (1); 3 March 2017 (2); 29 November 2019 (3)
- Running time: 380 minutes
- Country: India
- Language: Hindi
- Budget: ₹126 crore
- Box office: ₹150.38 crore

Commando is a series of Indian Hindi-language action thriller films produced by Vipul Amrutlal Shah under the banner of Sunshine Pictures. The film series is co-produced and distributed by Reliance Entertainment.

The first film Commando: A One Man Army directed by Dilip Ghosh was released in 2013, The second film Commando 2: The Black Money Trail directed by Deven Bhojani released in 2017 and the third film Commando 3 directed by Aditya Datt released in 2019. The series follows the story of an Indian Commando named Karanveer 'Karan' Singh Dogra (Vidyut Jammwal) and his missions.

The protagonist's name is inspired by Karan Singh, the Dogra dynasty ex-crown prince of Jammu and Kashmir. Jammwal, who is trained in the Indian martial arts of Kalaripayattu, performs his own stunts and martial arts in the film's action sequences. Commando 2 is the only film in the series to be released along with its Tamil and Telugu dubbed versions.

== Films ==
=== Commando: A One Man Army (2013) ===
Indian Commando Karanveer "Karan" Singh Dogra escapes from the Government of China after being accused as a spy, where he meets a woman named Simrit, who is on run from AK-74 and decides to protect her.

=== Commando 2: The Black Money Trail (2017) ===
Karan is assigned with Inspector Bhavna Reddy and ACP Bakthwar Khan to capture Vicky Chadda, a money launderer from Malaysia.

=== Commando 3 (2019) ===
Karan and Bhavna Reddy are assigned on a mission in London to stop a terrorist named Buraq Ansari from committing terrorist attacks in India.

== Series ==
=== Commando (2023) ===
A continuation of the film series with Adah Sharma reprising her character. The TV series introduced a new commando Virat played by debutante Prem.

== Games ==
Commando 2, an action mobile video game adaptation was developed by Zapak Mobile Games Pvt. Ltd. to accompany the film's release.

== Cast and characters ==
Character	Film		
Character	Commando (2013)	Commando 2 (2017)	Commando 3 (2019)
Commando Karanveer "Karan" Singh Dogra	Vidyut Jammwal	Vidyut Jammwal	Vidyut Jammwal
Colonel Akhilesh Sinha	Darshan Jariwala		
Simrit Kaur	Pooja Chopra		
Amrit 'AK-47' Kanwal	Jaideep Ahlawat		
Bhavna Reddy		Adah Sharma	Adah Sharma
Vicky Chaddha		Esha Gupta	
ACP Bakhtawar Khan		Freddy Daruwala	
Zafar Hussain		Sumit Gulati	
K.P.		Thakur Anoop Singh	
Mallika Sood			Angira Dhar
Buraq Ansari			Gulshan Devaiah
Zahira			Feryna Wazheir
Armaan Akhtar			Sumeet Thakur

== Crew ==
Occupation	Film		
Occupation	Commando (2013)	Commando 2 (2017)	Commando 3 (2019)
Director	Dilip Ghosh	Deven Bhojani	Aditya Datt
Producer(s)	Vipul Shah; Reliance Entertainment	Vipul Shah; Reliance Entertainment; Dhaval Jayantilal Gada	Vipul Shah; Reliance Entertainment; Dhaval Jayantilal Gada
Written By	Ritesh Shah	Ritesh Shah	Darius Yarmil; Junaid Wasi
Cinematography	Sejal Shah	Chirantan Das	Mark Hamilton
Editor	Amitabh Shukla	Amitabh Shukla; Sanjay Sharma	Sandeep Kurup
Composer(s)	Mannan Shaah	Mannan Shaah; Gourov Roshin	Mannan Shaah; Vikram Montrose
Background Score	Prasad Sasthe	Prasad Sasthe	Saurabh Bhalerao

== Release and revenue ==
Film	Release date	Budget	Worldwide Box Office
Commando	12 April 2013	₹17 crore	₹26 crore
Commando 2	3 March 2017	₹26 crore	₹39.04 crore
Commando 3	29 November 2019	₹30 crore	₹40.15 crore
Total		₹73 crore	₹105.19 crore
