= Namaste England =

2018 Indian film by Vipul Shah

- Theatrical release poster
- Directed by: Vipul Amrutlal Shah
- Written by: Suresh Nair; Ritesh Shah
- Produced by: Vipul Amrutlal Shah; Dhaval Jayantilal Gada; Akkshay Jayantilal Gada; Reliance Entertainment; Aashin A. Shah; Reshma Kadakia; Kushal Kantilal Gada; Firuzi Khan; Sameer Chopra
- Starring: Arjun Kapoor; Parineeti Chopra; Aditya Seal; Alankrita Sahai; Anil Mange; Satish Kaushik
- Cinematography: Yiannis Manolopoulos
- Edited by: Amitabh Shukla
- Music by: Songs: Mannan Shaah; Badshah; Amon Amarth; Background Score: Prasad Sashte
- Production companies: Pen Studios; Reliance Entertainment; Blockbuster Movie Entertainers
- Distributed by: Eros International
- Release date: 18 October 2018
- Running time: 141 minutes
- Country: India
- Language: Hindi
- Box office: ₹8.02 crore

Namaste England (transl. Greetings, England!) is a 2018 Indian Hindi-language romantic drama film directed and co-produced by Vipul Amrutlal Shah. The film is a spin-off to 2007 film Namastey London. The film stars Arjun Kapoor and Parineeti Chopra in lead roles alongside Aditya Seal, Shreya Mehta and Alankrita Sahai in supporting roles. Principal photography began on 23 February 2018 in Amritsar, Punjab. It was released worldwide on 18 October 2018 to overwhelmingly negative reviews and emerged as a box office disaster.

== Plot ==
Param is a man residing in a small village within Punjab. During Dusshera, he goes to see Ravan Dahan with his friends where he meets Jasmeet and subsequently falls for her. Jasmeet is a young, ambitious and educated girl, whose grandfather and older brother are opposed to her seeking employment due to their conservative background. Jasmeet can't go against their decision but still dreams of independence from them. After their first meeting, Param and Jasmeet meet several more times, where she grows closer to Param. To get close to her, Param conceives a plan and asks a friend of his to marry one of Jasmeet's friends. At the time of the wedding, Param and Jasmeet spend time together, subsequently expressing their love for one another. Param eventually finds Jasmeet a part-time position at a jewellery store; however, her grandfather finds out about this and begins to search for another groom.

Param convinces his father to send a marriage proposal to Jasmeet's family. Jasmeet's grandpa happily agrees but on the condition that Jasmeet should not work after marriage. During the wedding ceremony, Gurpreet disrespects Param's father. Gurpreet is humiliated and vows to make sure that Param never gets a visa. One year later, they're still trying to get a visa but fail. Jasmeet expresses her desire to settle down in London, England. She meets her school friend Harpreet who lives in London and gives the address of an illegal immigrant officer who can help them live in London. Param reveals to Jasmeet the officer suggested him to marry a British citizen for a visa and later on marry Jasmeet and live in London. Hearing this, Jasmeet immediately visits the lawyer and agrees for Param to get married but Param refuses. Jasmeeet tries to make him understand but in vain. Param's next option is to convince Gurpreet.

Param then goes to Gurpreet and tells him he is ready to apologise in front of everyone. Gurpreet says he forgave Param but Param's father has to apologise to him but Param doesn't agree. Soon the officer informs Jasmeet that he has secured her a job in the UK. Jasmeet is delighted and informs Param. While saying their goodbyes at the airport, Jasmeet blindsides Param by telling him that she's going on a marriage visa. The officer had arranged a man named Samar Singh Sandhu aka Sam who would pose as her husband. Sam has British citizenship and requires a girl to pose as his wife to please his elderly grandfather on his deathbed. Jasmeet and Sam meet and discuss their reasons for this marriage and assure each other that they are doing this for their own interests. Jasmeet travels to London. Param's love encourages him to seek help from the officer to reach London by any means. Upon arriving in London, Param follows Jasmeet and introduces himself to her neighbour Alisha who falls for him and supports Param in winning back Jasmeet. On the other hand, Sam's grandpa passes away and he is consoled by Jasmeet.

Jasmeet begins to realise her mistake as Param's wedding preparations are in full swing. Jasmeet admits to Sam the truth and he advises Jasmeet to return to Param. Jasmeet informs Param of her breakup with Sam at the Indian Embassy where Param has surrendered and expresses her desire to leave London and return to India. At the end of the film, they are reunited.

== Cast ==
- Arjun Kapoor as Paramveer "Param" Randhawa
- Parineeti Chopra as Jasmeet Kaur Randhawa
- Aditya Seal as Samar "Sam" Singh Sandhu
- Alankrita Sahai as Alisha Sharma, Param's neighbour
- Anil Mange as Iqbal Khan; a Pakistani illegal immigrant
- Satish Kaushik as Gurnaam Singh Shergill
- Mallika Dua as Harpreet Kaur Chaddha
- Sonia Goswami as Posh Party Diner
- Kishore Bhatt as Mosque Goer
- Manish Kumar Srivastava as Shyam
- Frina Mehta as Mean British Indian Girl
- Bharat Mistri as Wedding Suit Boutique Owner
- Vinod Nagpal as Gulshan Singh Sandhu, Sam's grandfather
- Mohit Chhabra as Balwant Singh Chaddha
- Glenn Webster as Security / Party Guest
- Nicholas Benjamin as Party Guest
- Prasanna Kumara Dissanayake as Party Guest
- Abdul Hakim Joy as Seven Eleven Staff
- Shreya Mehta as Mitthi
- Badshah as himself in the song "Proper Patola" (special appearance)

== Production ==
Principal photography began in February 2018. The film was shot in 75 locations including Amritsar, Patiala, Ludhiana, Jalandhar, Paris, Brussels, London and Southampton. This is the second collaboration between Kapoor and Chopra after Ishaqzaade (2012) and followed by Sandeep Aur Pinky Faraar (2021).

== Soundtrack ==
Namaste England

Soundtrack album by Mannan Shah, Badshah and Rishi Rich
- Released: 3 October 2018
- Recorded: 2018
- Genre: Feature film soundtrack
- Length: 34:15
- Language: Hindi
- Label: Sony Music India

Mannan Shaah chronology
Commando 2: The Black Money Trail (2017)	Namaste England (2018)	Commando 3 (2019)

Badshah chronology
Nawabzaade (2018)	Namaste England (2018)	Saaho (2019)

Rishi Rich chronology
Poster Boys (2017)	Namaste England (2018)	Gully Boy (2019)

The soundtrack album is composed by Mannan Shaah, Badshah and Rishi Rich the lyrics penned by Javed Akhtar, Master Rakesh and Badshah. The soundtrack rights were acquired by Sony Music India.

Track listing
No.	Title	Lyrics	Music	Singer(s)	Length
1.	"Tere Liye"	Javed Akhtar	Mannan Shaah	Atif Aslam, Akanksha Bhandari	5:34
2.	"Bhare Bazaar"	Master Rakesh, Rap lyrics: Badshah	Badshah, Rishi Rich	Vishal Dadlani, Payal Dev, Badshah, B Praak	3:34
3.	"Dhoom Dhadaka"	Javed Akhtar	Mannan Shaah	Shahid Mallya, Antara Mitra	5:57
4.	"Tu Meri Main Tera"	Javed Akhtar	Mannan Shaah	Rahat Fateh Ali Khan, Altamash Faridi, Shadab Faridi	5:18
5.	"Kya Kahoon Janeman"	Javed Akhtar	Mannan Shaah	Shashaa Tirupati	4:38
6.	"Ziddi Hai Dil"	Javed Akhtar	Mannan Shaah	Mannan Shaah	6:16
7.	"Proper Patola"	Badshah	Badshah	Badshah, Diljit Dosanjh, Aastha Gill	2:58
Total length:					34:15

== Marketing and promotions ==
The first look of the movie was released on 14 August 2018, by Parineeti and Arjun on their Twitter handle.

During the promotional campaigns, the movie landed into controversy when one of the movie posters released had Indian map in the background from which, Aksai Chin region of Ladakh in Indian-administered Kashmir was missing.

The official trailer for the film was released on 6 September 2018.

== Release ==
The film was released on 18 October 2018, clashing with the release of Ayushmann Khurrana's Badhaai Ho.

=== Home media ===
The satellite rights of the film were bagged by Zee Network.

== Reception ==
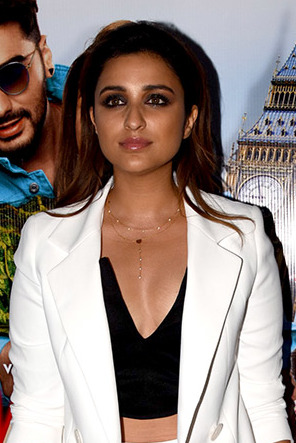
Parineeti Chopra in 2018

=== Critical response ===
The film received generally negative reviews from critics; out of 16 reviews, only 4 received equal to or more than a 2-star rating.

Zee News and The Statesman, both posting the same IANS review, gave the film 4 out of 5 stars, saying that the film "has a pure heart," and that "the cast performs with sincerity that sometimes gets stagey. While Arjun and Parineeti look comfortable in each other`s company, some of their romantic moments together are done with the over-cute impishness that seems way out of line." The reviewer also noted that most of the secondary characters seem more entertaining than the leads: "Aditya Seal as Parineeti`s trophy-husband succeeds in making his character of a spoilt NRI brat anything but a jerk...Seal does well for himself." The film is beautifully shot by Yiannis Manolopoulos, and that "While the narrative serenades the effervescent mood, a serious tone is allowed to creep in with a statement on the issue of illegal migrants in Europe."

Urvi Parikh of Rediff.com gave the film 2.5 out of 5 stars, and says that the film is "all things that the Akshay Kumar-Katrina Kaif starrer Namastey London was not." She notes that "Vipul Shah fails to give us a crisp storyline, hard-hitting dialogues and memorable punch lines." She notes that the movie tries to deal with women's empowerment, but "the depiction is so wrong that at the end of it, you only feel sorry for the crew." She praised actress Mallika Dua and actor Aditya Seal, noting that they do a fairly good job with the material they are given. But she also noted that the film "drags after a point. You neither sympathise with the actors nor empathise with them."

Rachit Gupta of The Times of India gave the film 2 out of 5 stars, noting that the lead pair Kapoor and Chopra had "crackling chemistry in Ishaqzaade and still look great together, but their characters are so poorly crafted that even their best efforts can't salvage the story." He particularly praised Chopra, noting that "Parineeti, in particular, tries very hard to add some semblance of respect with her performance, but it just doesn't work out." He also praised Alankrita Sahai, saying that she had "a glamorous avatar, looks great on-screen, but her role doesn't offer any chance to perform, either." In a more critical sense, he added the while the locations and cinematography is at times beautiful, "even if you do come to terms with the regressive values of the characters, the ho-hum screenplay makes 'Namaste England' a lot tougher to sit through." He noted the long-drawn first half, with a twist at the interval, "but then the second half dives into over-the-top comedy and melodrama." He also criticized the background score, which "feels like it belongs in a campy 90s comedy." Overall Gupta was slightly disappointed with the film, noting that "'Namaste England' has a lot of promise, but the film just isn't able to shake off the ill-effects of clichéd storytelling. This one's a classic case of love's labour lost."

Mayur Sanap of The Deccan Chronicle also gave the film 2 out of 5 stars, saying it is "Easy on the eye, difficult on the senses." Sanap praised the chemistry between the two leads and said that they seem like a natural fit together; yet that the film as a whole is "forced and takes the audience for granted." Sanap says that the film tries to have everything that a good Bollywood romance film should have, but that the film is the latest attempt of the "makers' futile attempt at encashing popular movie brand." Sanap says that its greatest shortcoming is that it is "neither a compelling tearjerker nor an epic romance. It's a film with no heart, no sense, just a series of orchestrated, contrived scenes..." Sanap commends Kapoor for being 'sincere' but that there is nothing about him the audience "hasn't seen before...." and that Parineeti "lacks gravitas. There is glossiness instead of authenticity..." In conclusion he says, "The film had the potential to be a real crowd-pleaser, but it feels forced, confused, and takes the audience for granted. It is better to say good-bye to this one."

Udita Jhunjhunwala of First Post gave the film 1.5 out of 5 stars, saying that its "romance suffers from a dull, infantile script." She said that the lead characters struggle to "bring their A-game," but that the script was so "infantile" that it was hard to blame them entirely. She noted that she enjoyed some of the minor characters, saying that "These friends and their attempts to play cupid are the most, and perhaps only really entertaining, part of this juvenile story." Overall, Jhunhunwala felt the film was underwhelming: "The loose direction, tepid interaction between the leads, an immature premise, dull locations, and Jasmeet and Param’s illogical actions are exasperating. Namaste England is so dated in its ideas, storytelling and design that it even makes a stimulating city like London look rusty."

Charu Thakur of India Today also gave the film 1.5 out of 5 stars, saying that "Arjun and Parineeti are forgettable in stale film." He noted a multitude of issues: "an ammunition of boredom in terms of a sketchy plotline, bad acting, lazy script, silly dialogues and a sleep-inducing love story with almost zero chemistry." Thakur also called the film very predictable and the performances of the actors as "straight-faced" and "so off the mark that they will make even a newcomer look better in front of them." Finally, Thakur concluded by urging the reader to "skip Namaste England," calling it a "complete waste of time."

Kunal Guha of Mumbai Mirror also gave the film 1.5 out of 5 stars, summarizing the film by saying: " The lack of conflict or chemistry between the lead couple, tedious dialogue and a mumbling monologue on how being an Indian is a matter of well-deserved pride (similar to the one in Namaste London (2007), minus the impact) restrict this story from taking any definitive direction." Guha noted that the film could have been a chance for the lead actors to "salvage their scattered careers and conjure the same magic they brought to the screen as newcomers," but that the scripted material doesn't give them that opportunity. He noted that the director Shah would have "had his mind and heart in the right place" due to well-done past films, but that he didn't deliver this time. Finally, Guha addresses that the film made a "desperate attempt to draw empathy for the sorry lives of illegal immigrants," which only worked minimally well.

Jyoti Sharma Bawa of the Hindustan Times gave the film 1 out of 5 stars, and panned it, saying that it was "a film that should end careers." She said that beyond the somewhat serious handling of a social issue, the film is "so silly and tedious that the one star I have given it feels like my good deed of the year done." She goes on to criticize much of the film's structure, saying it had "a puerile storyline, hammy performances and dialogues so dreary, they leave you seething with murderous rage." The movie also felt 'highly regressive' to Bawa and she also criticized Kapoor's acting as hammy, and Chopra as "half-baked" and hard to identify with.

Shubra Gupta of The Indian Express also gave the film 1 out of 5 stars, calling it "just a plain bad film," noting that its predecessor "Namaste London" was at least engaging, but that this film had none of its appeal. She said "a better film could have made something of the heartbreak and challenges people face when leaving their country for another. But Namaste England is not that film. It's been a while since I’ve seen something so clichéd and charmless."

Saibal Chatterjee of NDTV also gave the film 1 out of 5 stars, and criticized the poorly fleshed-out script and acting from Kapoor and Chopra. He noted that the previous film in the series, Namaste London, had at least a serviceable story and was entertaining enough at times, but that this film had no such redeeming qualities and that the "lazily scripted film is aggravated by rank bad acting. Neither Arjun Kapoor nor Parineeti Chopra, together on the big screen for the first time after the infinitely better Ishaqzaade (2012), manage to rise above the muck that they are made to wade through."

Times Now News also gave the film 1 out of 5 stars, noting that although the film is a sequel to Namaste London, its good moments "aren't even a tad bit close to the magic woven by" its predecessor, and calling it "quite underwhelming." They noted that although the film tried to have a meaningful issue addressed, "the treatment seems dated. The storyline and plot, both, are underwhelmingly half-cooked." The songs were mostly forgettable; although it picks up in the second half, it's "mostly packed with melodrama." The review concludes by stating,"With a wafer-thin plot, a week screenplay and nothing that will hook you to the film, Namaste England is a dramatic love story that falls short on both – the right kind of love and a story – and leaves you feeling that the film is way behind time."

Suhani Singh of India Today also gave the film 1 out of 5 stars, calling it "an exasperating romantic drama with astounding levels of ludicrousness." She says that it "begins with the dullest, most unimaginative boy-meets-girl story and it only goes downhill from there." She was especially critical of the writers, who noted that their characters "laugh needlessly and excessively or say things like 'How profound' or 'So beautiful' at random intervals." In conclusion, Singh was left unimpressed, saying "If Namaste England tries to say anything at all, it's that it is easier to get married and harder to stay in love. Only it's got the most nonsensical way to tell it."

Nandani Ramnath of Scroll.in calls the film a "tedious affair from start to finish." Ramnath found the scope of the film unimpressive, stating: "There is barely a moment of relief from the tedium of watching the leads go through the motions and tuning into the poorly written dialogue and endlessly uninvolving moments." She was particularly critical of Kapoor, who she said "flubs all his scenes, whether romantic or nationalistic (what’s a movie set on foreign soul without a speech celebrating the wonders of the homeland?)."

Rohit Vats of News 18 gave the film 0.5 out of 5 stars, and said that the film "falls way short of expectations, and that Arjun Kapoor and Parineeti Chopra have been given a very thin script to play with." He noted that it had potential, and was right "on-paper," but that ultimately it was "a shoddy tale enacted by clueless actors, a highly sexist understanding of the Indian diaspora in London and brazenly forced songs." He also notes that the film feels outdated and that there is a slut-shaming sequence by Chopra's character which feels out of place. In summary, Vats says, "At 141-minute duration, Namaste England goes nowhere and seems like that odd star in the space which all your childhood friends talked about but nobody could see and locate. You still don't know if it was even there or not."

Rajeev Masand of News18 gave the film 0 out of 5 stars, panning it almost entirely: "This is a movie about stupid people who do stupid things while stupidly trying to convince themselves and others that they’re doing it for love." He criticized the plot for being unconvincing and shallow, its twists as predictable, and the characters as vapid. He particularly called out Chopra's character as selfish and manipulative: "Add that to the fact that Jasmeet is also fantastically foolish, and you’ve got a heroine with practically no redeeming qualities whatsoever." He called Kapoor's character a "doormat," having "no self-respect," but ultimately admitted that the script itself was so bad that not even " Aamir Khan or Meryl Streep" could better it. In conclusion, Masand mused: "It’s hard to apply a traditional rating yardstick to a film that’s bereft of logic, one that possesses not even a modicum of common sense or plausibility. I’m going to skip rating Namaste England. Yes, this is that kind of awful film."

Rahul Desai of Film Companion also gave the film 0 out of 5 stars and panned the film, calling it "the most unwatchable Hindi film of 2018," and that it is "so insufferably stupid and senseless that even the strategy of inserting the horrid trailer of a movie named Rangeela Raja...fails to elevate our relative perception of Vipul Amrutlal Shah's bogus opus." He also said that the "most expressive actor in this film is a tractor in Pind, which does a wheelie (presumably out of shock)." Post the interval, Desai said that the film turns into "a mild-mannered Ajnabee, complete with the swinging and creepy mind-games, and attempts to deliver social commentary on the epidemic of undocumented immigration and starry-eyed dreams." Desai also heavily criticized Kapoor, noting that "each year, he looks more and more like a disinterested man forced to participate in the family business. It's not just the way he recites his lines; it's his cluelessness between them that suggests he is yet to learn that acting is primarily about reacting."

=== Box office ===
Namaste England performed poorly on its first day, collecting Rs 10.5 million despite being released on a holiday. There were certain issues with distributors in Madhya Pradesh as multiplex chains did not allow the film to release in single screens, giving preference to the other film releasing on the same day, Badhaai Ho. By the second and third days, the film drew in about 1.4 crore more, to bring the total to approximately Rs. 1.90 crore. By 22 October 2018, four days after its release, the film managed to make only Rs. 25.5 million. In overseas the film was released in 58 screens but opened with ₹5321,000. This was concerning to analysts who had noted that it was released on a Thursday, and had the benefit of an extended weekend; they were also surprised that the combined star power of both Kapoor and Chopra, who ordinarily would be able to draw audiences by name alone, did not create a strong box office draw for this film. They concluded that poor reviews, with accompanying poor word of mouth, prevented the film from earning as much as it otherwise could have.

On 26 October, the film was pulled from cinemas just before the start of its second week, since box office collections were considerably poorer than expected (Rs. 30 million) for the entire first week. As the film had not managed to make even Rs. 40 million, its distributors decided to limit its release early.
