= Namastey London =

2007 Indian film by Vipul Shah

- Theatrical release poster
- Directed by: Vipul Amrutlal Shah
- Written by: Suresh Nair
- Dialogues by: Ritesh Shah
- Produced by: Vipul Amrutlal Shah
- Starring: Akshay Kumar; Katrina Kaif; Rishi Kapoor; Nina Wadia; Upen Patel; Clive Standen
- Cinematography: Jonathan Bloom; Dariusz Wolski
- Edited by: Amitabh Shukla
- Music by: Songs: Himesh Reshammiya; Background Score: Salim-Sulaiman
- Distributed by: Adlabs Films; Blockbuster Movie Entertainers; Eros International
- Release date: 23 March 2007
- Running time: 128 minutes
- Country: India
- Languages: Hindi; English
- Budget: ₹210 million
- Box office: ₹714 million

Namastey London (transl. Hello London) is a 2007 Indian Hindi-language romantic comedy film directed and produced by Vipul Amrutlal Shah. It stars Akshay Kumar, Katrina Kaif, Rishi Kapoor, Nina Wadia, Javed Sheikh, Upen Patel and Clive Standen, with Riteish Deshmukh in a guest appearance.

Namastey London was theatrically released on 23 March 2007, and received positive reviews for its direction, screenplay, soundtrack, and Kumar's performance. It was a box office success, earning ₹71.40 crore worldwide, thus becoming the ninth-highest grossing Hindi film of 2007. Although critics noted similarities between the film and Manoj Kumar's Purab Aur Paschim (1970), Vipul Shah denied Namastey London was a remake. At the 53rd Filmfare Awards, Namastey London received 1 nomination – Best Actor (Kumar). The film has sinced gained cult status.

== Plot ==
Indian-born Manmohan Malhotra relocated to London to establish himself and return to India, and he married Bebo; after four years, he obtained a visa for her so that she could live with him. Shortly thereafter, she gave birth to Jasmeet. Manmohan was always embarrassed by Bebo as she could not speak English and hence couldn't mingle with British people.

He often left her out of events so Bebo wanted Jasmeet to have a different life. She sent her to an English-medium school. Encouraged her to befriend people from Britain. Over time Jasmeet became Jazz living a life but she slowly drifted away, from her Indian roots.

Her father had set her to meet a young person, Bobby Bedi, although the date turns out to be a disaster, and Bobby leaves and decides to reject her. Manmohan thinks that it is impossible to get him an Indian son-in-law, and his best friend, Parvez Khan, is in a similar situation with his son Imran, who also has a girlfriend, Susan. Manmohan takes his family on a tour of India and makes a deal with Jasmeet, marry Arjun if and only if you believe you won't meet anyone better than him. But in order to accept this deal, Jasmeet must do the rituals prior to any real marriage. Arjun feels tricked as he assumed they are really married. Jasmeet wants to prove Arjun isn't the one.

On their return to London, Jasmeet announces that she will marry an Englishman named Charlie Brown, who is well educated and has good friends and connections, even with Prince Charles. She refuses to recognise her marriage to Arjun as there is no legal proof of the wedding.

When Jasmeet is introduced to the friends of the Brown family, she is subjected to racial comments from them and feels offended. Arjun notices Jazz is unhappy and goes with her to tell Charlie's family about India and Arjun speaks in Hindi and Jazz translates this for Charlie's family in English as they do not understand Hindi.

Jazz gets engaged to Charlie Brown, leaving Arjun depressed as he leaves while Manmohan finds him in the bar. Arjun tells Manmohan that Jazz has married Charlie, and he is in fact heartbroken that she left him for Charlie and realizes that he isn't the right man for her. Arjun also accepts Charlie's challenge of a rugby match despite not knowing how to play.

Charlie and his rugby teammates make fun of the Indians and Pakistanis not knowing the game. As Manmohan is tired of playing rugby, he calls Arjun over to defeat the England team, and he wins the rugby match, impressing Jazz.

Arjun tells Jazz that when they get old they will meet at London at the same exact place as they met when they were young and Arjun imagines the future when he and Jazz meet several years later and Arjun spots a beard. And around this period, Jazz becomes closer with Arjun and Charlie starts to get irritated with Arjun since he fell in love with Jazz but Arjun still supports Jazz.

Susan's parents then ask Imran to leave Islam and become a Christian and to change his name to Emmanuel or Ian, as well as provide written proof that his family is not associated with terrorists. Jazz goes to Arjun asking for a divorce and she leaves him heartbroken. At night Arjun talks to his family about how London went and he misses his mother deeply and he is unable to handle the memories and misses his parents deeply. Arjun closes the call and breaks down into tears knowing that Jazz wanted to divorce him.

Jazz sees this the whole time and she comforts him and they both dance and Arjun starts telling her that when he begins to get old one day he will go to London to meet her again next time. The film ends on a happy note when Imran decides not to be a Christian and Susan is accepted by Imran's family. Arjun walks Jazz down the altar to Charlie.

Jazz is stunned to learn that Arjun has been pretending not to understand English even though he speaks it well. As the wedding approaches Arjun asks Charlie to keep Jazz happy and to be a husband to Jazz. Despite Arjuns feelings for Jazz Arjun walks away, from the wedding in tears carrying the pain of losing Jazz.

Jazz realized about Arjun's heartbreak and she decides not to marry Charlie as she began to have true feelings for Arjun and began to remember when she married Arjun in India. She runs away from her wedding to see Arjun who has left in a car and her family smiles happily and begins to be proud that she has agreed to marry Arjun as it was their truest dream for it to happen anytime sooner and this leaves Charlie upset and angry alone.

After the wedding she goes with Arjun back to India, where they are seen riding Arjun's motorcycle. While they are on the motorcycle, Arjun reveals that he all along he was fluent in English and that he had already dropped the clue when he was offended by Charlie's uncle's derogatory comments on India. He adds that he lied because he was still an Indian at heart, and they smile together on a bike.

== Cast ==
- Akshay Kumar as Arjun Ballu Singh, an attractive man who falls in love with Jazz
- Katrina Kaif as Jasmeet ''Jazz'' Malhotra, Manmohan and Bebo's daughter
- Rishi Kapoor as Manmohan Malhotra, Jazz's father and Bebo's husband
- Nina Wadia as Bebo Malhotra, Jazz's mother and Manmohan's wife
- Riteish Deshmukh as Bobby Bedi, Jazz's first love interest who rejects her (special appearance)
- Upen Patel as Imran ''Immi'' Khan, Susan's love interest
- Clive Standen as Charles "Charlie" Brown, Jazz's crush
- Tiffany Mulheron as Susan, Imran's love interest
- Jawed Sheikh as Parvez Khan, Imran's father, who does not approve of Susan
- Vir Das as Prospective Groom No.2
- Kunal Kumar as Prospective Groom No.1
- Gurpreet Ghuggi as Taxi Driver

== Production ==
The first half of Namastey London was set in Punjab, while the second half took place in London. Consequently, the movie was filmed across 50 locations in the UK, including Slough, Windsor, Bromley, and various parts of London. Iconic London landmarks featured prominently, such as the London Eye (seen at least nine times), Tower Bridge, Millennium Bridge, St Paul's Cathedral, Greenwich, Buckingham Palace, Canary Wharf, Big Ben, Trafalgar Square, and the National Gallery. The Punjab scenes were shot near Chandigarh.

== Soundtrack ==
Namastey London

Soundtrack album by Himesh Reshammiya
- Released: 27 January 2007
- Recorded: 2007
- Venue: Mumbai
- Genre: Feature film soundtrack
- Length: 96:47
- Language: Hindi
- Labels: Eros Now and Sony Music India
- Producer: Himesh Reshammiya

Himesh Reshammiya chronology
Red: The Dark Side (2007)	Namastey London (2007)	Shakalaka Boom Boom (2007)

The soundtrack album was released on 27 January 2007 and received good reviews. The songs were composed by Himesh Reshammiya. Salim–Sulaiman composed the film score. All songs were penned by Javed Akhtar.

No.	Title	Singer(s)	Length
1.	"Chakna Chakna"	Himesh Reshammiya	5:45
2.	"Viraaniya"	Himesh Reshammiya	5:43
3.	"Main Jahaan Rahoon"	Rahat Fateh Ali Khan, Krishna Beura	6:22
4.	"Yahi Hota Pyaar"	Himesh Reshammiya, Sunidhi Chauhan	6:23
5.	"Rafta Rafta"	RDB	4:42
6.	"Annan Faanan"	Jayesh Gandhi, Akriti Kakkar	6:02
7.	"Dilruba"	Zubeen Garg, Alisha Chinai	5:31
9.	"Aanan Faanan" (Mehfil Mix)	Jayesh Gandhi, Akriti Kakkar	7:19
10.	"Chakna Chakna" (Remix)	Himesh Reshammiya	3:53
11.	"Dilruba" (Remix)	Zubeen Garg, Alisha Chinai	5:12
12.	"Main Jahaan Rahoon (Remix)"	Rahat Fateh Ali Khan	5:09
13.	"Yahi Hota Pyaar" (Remix)	Himesh Reshammiya, Sunidhi Chauhan	4:40
14.	"Aanan Faanan" (Remix)	Jayesh Gandhi, Akriti Kakkar	4:57
15.	"Main Jahaan Rahoon" (Mehfil Mix)	Rahat Fateh Ali Khan	7:07
16.	"Yahi Hota Pyaar" (Mehfil Mix)	Himesh Reshammiya, Sunidhi Chauhan	6:36
17.	"Viraaniyan" (Remix)	Himesh Reshammiya	4:23
18.	"Rafta Rafta" (Remix)	RDB	3:47
Total length:			96:47

== Release and reception ==
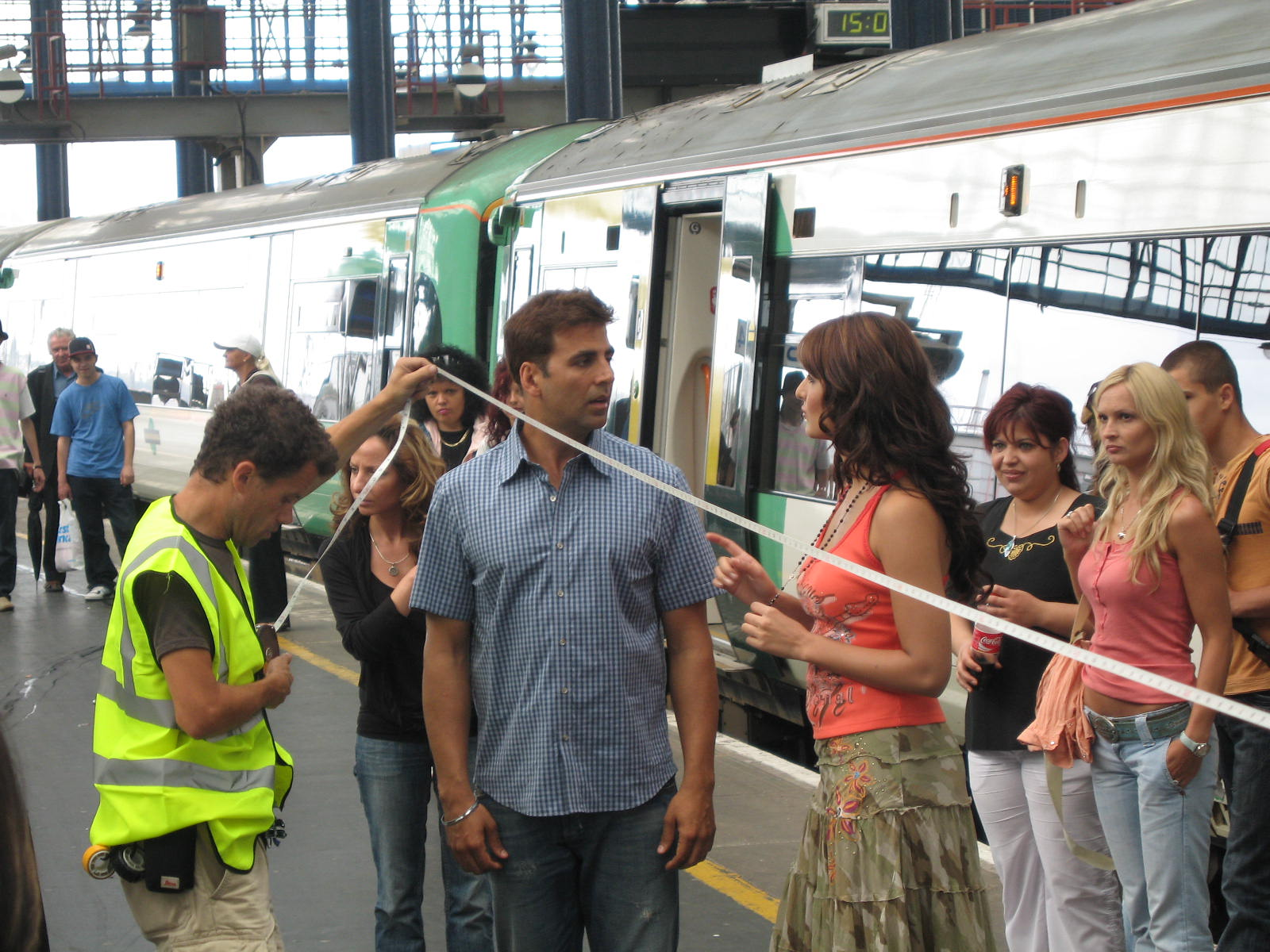
Akshay Kumar and Katrina Kaif on the set of Namastey London

The film was released on 23 March 2007 worldwide.

Shooting for the film began on 16 August 2006 and ended on 7 September 2006.

Priyanka Chopra was the original choice for Jazz but was replaced by Katrina Kaif.

Namastey London received positive reviews from critics upon release. Taran Adarsh of indiafm.com wrote, "Namastey London is addictive stuff. You watch it once, you wanna watch it again." Kumar received almost unanimous praise for his portrayal of Arjun Singh, with a critic saying "Kumar certainly leaves his mark throughout the flick. One of the coolest performances of the star." Adarsh said "One of his finest performances so far, Namastey London also marks the coming of age of an actor who was often dubbed as an action hero or a funster. Kumar not only wins the heart of Kaif on-screen, he's sure to win the hearts of millions of moviegoers with a terrific portrayal in this film." On Katrina Kaif's performance he wrote, "she handles the complex part with remarkable ease. The pretty lass is only getting better with every film." Despite the generally favorable reviews, Prachi Singh of Moviewalah panned the film, with a verdict of 2 out of 5 stars.

== Box office ==
Namastey London opened to a good response and mainly picked up momentum after the second and third day of its release, a major reason being India's exit from the 2007 Cricket World Cup. The film did extremely well in the northern parts of India, especially in Punjab, Haryana, Rajasthan, and Uttar Pradesh. It also did well in Mumbai and in the first week of its release collected ₹73,575,657. The film was also received well in other parts of the country. The success of the film ended a long spell of box office failures since the release of Salaam-e-Ishq: A Tribute to Love which released in January 2007. The film went on to gross ₹714,102,500 worldwide, making it one of the top hits of 2007.

The film was also successful overseas. It debuted at number 9 on the UK charts and similarly debuted within the top 20 in the United States and Australian charts. The film collected £238,841 in the first week of its release. As of 27 July 2007, the movie grossed an estimated $15,273,747 in five territories, which included the United States ($4,149,772), Australia ($197,148), India ($17,267,662), Malaysia ($15,285), and the United Kingdom ($9,021,900).

== Remake and sequel ==
The film was unofficially remade in Bengali as Paran Jai Jaliya Re starring Dev and Subhashree Ganguly. The Kolkata High Court in December 2009 banned the screening of the film for plagiarism after a petition was filed by the film's producers.

In March 2011, Shah had announced a sequel, Namaste England. Kumar and Sonakshi Sinha were initially signed to play the leads in the sequel. Namaste England was released in October 2018 with Parineeti Chopra and Arjun Kapoor starring.
