= Bastar: The Naxal Story =

2024 Indian political thriller film

- Theatrical release poster
- Directed by: Sudipto Sen
- Written by: Amarnath Jha; Sudipto Sen; Vipul Amrutlal Shah
- Story by: Sudipto Sen; Amarnath Jha
- Produced by: Vipul Amrutlal Shah
- Starring: Adah Sharma; Indira Tiwari; Vijay Krishna; Raima Sen; Shilpa Shukla
- Cinematography: Ragul Dharuman
- Edited by: Dev Rao Jadhav
- Music by: Bishakh Jyoti
- Production company: Sunshine Pictures
- Release date: 15 March 2024
- Running time: 124 minutes
- Country: India
- Language: Hindi
- Budget: ₹15 crore
- Box office: ₹1.79–3 crore

Bastar: The Naxal Story is a 2024 Indian Hindi-language political thriller film directed by Sudipto Sen and produced by Vipul Amrutlal Shah. It stars Adah Sharma, Indira Tiwari, Vijay Krishna, Shilpa Shukla, Yashpal Sharma, Subrat Dutta and Raima Sen.

The film was announced in June 2023, along with the title of the film, it's based on the Naxalite–Maoist insurgency in the Bastar district of Chhattisgarh and the April 2010 Maoist attack in Dantewada. Bastar was theatrically released on 15 March 2024. The film received negative reviews from critics and was a major box office bomb.

== Cast ==
- Adah Sharma as I.P.S. Neerja Madhavan
- Indira Tiwari as Ratna
- Vijay Krishna as Lanka Reddy
- Raima Sen as Vanya Roy
- Shilpa Shukla as Neelam Nagpal
- Yashpal Sharma as Utpal Trivedi
- Subrat Dutta as Millind Kashyap
- Kishor Kadam as Rajendra Karma
- Anamika Tiwari as Baruna
- Purnendu Bhattacharya as Narayan Bagchi
- Anangsha Biswas as Lakshmi
- Sanjay Borkar as Gynaecologist
- Atharva Sawant as Saryu
- Gopal K. Singh as Srivastav
- Naman Jain as Raman
- Vikas Shukla as Dr. Ajay
- Abhikalp Gagdekar as Vellala Maharaja
- Gandhali Jain as Yamuna Nagar
- Sameer Trimbakkar as Male Judge
- Sukanya Dhanda as Female Judge
- Nidhi Rasane as Rama
- Priyank Raj as Alok Puneet
- Lokesh Dahariya as Sub-Inspector

== Production ==
=== Development ===
The film was produced by Vipul Amrutlal Shah and directed by Sudipto Sen, who is also the story writer of the film. In June 2023, Sunshine Pictures, the production company of the film, via social media, announced their next film titled Bastar.

=== Filming ===
The principal photography commenced on 19 October 2023, with a muhurat puja and completed the first schedule of shooting.

== Release ==
=== Theatrical ===
Bastar was theatrically released on 15 March 2024. The film was not properly released and got only a screen or two at the theatres.

=== Home Video ===
The digital streaming rights of Bastar was bought by ZEE5. The film started streaming on 17 May 2024.

== Reception ==
Bastar: The Naxal Story wasn't well-received by critics. On the review aggregator website Rotten Tomatoes, 43% of 7 critics' reviews are positive, with an average rating of 4.3/10.

Abhishek Srivastava of The Times of India rated 3/5 and wrote "Bastar is a hard-hitting crime drama, with moments that surely shake you." Deepa Gahlot of Rediff.com gave 2/5 stars and wrote "The Naxal movement has such a complex history that several books have been written to understand it. Bastar: The Naxal Story seeks to reduce it to bullet points and stereotypes."

Rohit Bhatnagar of The Free Press Journal gave 2/5 stars and wrote "Bastar: The Naxal Story is a sloppy docudrama that is away from thrill, adventure and drama". Zinia Bandyopadhyay of India Today gave 1/5 stars and wrote that Bastar is "Sensational, oversimplified film with no nuance".

Shubhra Gupta of The Indian Express rated 0.5/5 stars and wrote "To expect any kind of nuance from the makers of The Kerala Story would have been a stretch. Bastar is more of the same." Samvartha Sahil of Deccan Herald rated 0.5/5 stars and wrote "Sudipto Sen’s new feature film Bastar: The Naxal Story lacks not just an understanding of a complex political situation, and its larger socio-economic undercurrents, but also of constructing a compelling narrative."
