= Sruthy Sasidharan =

Playback singer (born 1993)

- Born: March 25, 1993 (age 32); Kozhikode, Kerala, India
- Occupation: Playback singer
- Years active: 2017–current

Sruthy Sasidharan is an Indian playback singer and voice-over artist. She sings in Malayalam, Tamil, Kannada, Telugu, Marathi and Hindi.

== Personal life ==
Sruthy Sasidharan was born in Kozhikode, Kerala. She did her schooling in Kozhikode and in Malappuram. She received her initial classical training from Baburaj and later continued her training with Krishnakumar from Kerala. She did school education at NSS High school Manjeri and completed plus two at GBHSS Manjeri. She started performing in TV channels and radio at a young age and participated in state and national level youth festival. She attended College of Engineering, Trivandrum and graduated her Computer Science Engineering in 2015. She is married to Deepak Sunil and is now settled in the U.S. She has a younger brother.

== Career ==
While pursuing her career in engineering she continued to perform in concerts. She later left her job to pursue her passion in music. She first started her career by singing for various ad films including Bhima Jewellers and giving backing vocals for back score for some movies. Sruthy stepped into the world of playback singing with the song "Kiya kiva" from the movie Akashamittayi (Malayalam). She continued her work in Malayalam movies with Mayillla Njan from Queen for Jakes Bejoy, "Nenjil" from the movie "Ikkayude shakadam" for Charles Nazerath. Her song "Kadhale" for Sushin Shyam from the movie "Maradona" topped the charts and brought her many award nominations and wider recognition. She then started to sing for other languages too. In Tamil, her song "Nee en", featuring Charu Hassan, for the movie "Dhadha 87", with the music director Leander Lee Marthy. She also sung in a couple of Kannada movies like "Chanaksha", and also in Marathi movies.

== Filmography ==
Year	Song title	Film/Soundtrack/Album	Language	Composer
2017	"Ennomale En Jeevane"	Single	Malayalam	Prakash Alex
2017	"Chingathin Pon Veyil"	Single	Malayalam	Charles Nazareth
2017	"Nee Varumoru Neram"	Single	Malayalam	Roby Abraham
2017	"Hey Hey"	Single	Malayalam	Akash
2018	"Mayilla Njan"	Queen (2018 film)	Malayalam	Jakes Bejoy
2018	"Kadhale Kannin"	Maradona (2018 film)	Malayalam	Sushin Shyam
2018	"Prem"	Single	Marathi	Akash
2018	"Thiruyodonnu Njan"	Single	Malayalam	Aby Mathew and Sankara
2018	"Usurey"	Single	Tamil	Lak
2018	"Nee En"	Dha Dha 87	Tamil	Leander Lee Marthy
2018	"Neeyum Nila Poovum"	Single	Malayalam	Charles Nazareth
2018	"Sundara Adachane"	Chanaksha	Kannada	Abhimann Roy
2019	"Chandnyara"	Single	Marathi	Aadi Ramachandra
2019	"Nenjil"	Ikkayude Shakadam	Malayalam	Charles Nazareth
2019	"Kannil Kannil"	Grandfather	Malayalam	Vishnu Mohan Sitara
2019	"Oru Vaakku"	Single	Malayalam	Prince Rex
2019	"Naanu Neenu"	Pailwaan	Kannada	Arjun Janya
2019	"Vaanam Vittu"	Bailwaan	Tamil	Arjun Janya
2019	"Ivide Naam"	Ennodu Para I Love You Ennu	Malayalam	Sumesh Parameswar
2019	"Vellai Poove"	Hi Hello Kadhal	Malayalam	Vishnu Shyam
2019	"Akhiyaan Milavanga"	Commando 3	Hindi	Mannan Shaah
2021	"Parthaen Rasithaen"	Single	Tamil	Lak
2021	"Usurey Rush [Remix]"	Single	Tamil	Lak
