= Aadhi Haqeeqat, Aadha Fasana =

- Directed by: Dilip Ghosh
- Written by: Jill Misquitta
- Produced by: Ravi Malik
- Cinematography: K. U. Mohanan
- Release date: 1990
- Running time: 88 minutes
- Country: India
- Language: Hindi/English

Aadhi Haqeeqat, Aadha Fasana (English title – Children of the Silver Screen) is a 1990 Hindi/English language Documentary Feature film directed by Dilip Ghosh and produced by Ravi Malik in association with the National Film Development Corporation of India.

While working in advertising, Dilip Ghosh had the opportunity to work with many child actors. He had observed them closely and was inspired to tell their story. This was expressed through his docu-feature film titled Children of the Silver Screen (Hindi: Aadhi Haqeeqat Aadha Fasana). It was a unique exploration into the world of professional child actors. Children of the Silver Screen captures the price child stars pay for glory. This effort fetched him many honors and much recognition both national and international: including the National Film Award [Special Mention] and the Special Jury Prize at Cairo International Children Film Festival. The film was showcased in over 25 International Film Festivals.

== Awards ==
In 1990, Children of the Silver Screen won the 38th National Film Award – Special Jury Award /Special Mention (Non-Feature Film). It also won the Jury prize at the second international film festival for children's films held in 1991 at Cairo.
