= Ritesh Shah =

Indian screenwriter (born 1976)

- Born: Anantnag, Jammu and Kashmir, India
- Education: Hindu College (1993-1996), Jamia Millia Islamia
- Occupation: Screenwriter
- Years active: 1997
- Awards: Zee Cine Award for Dialogue for Pink in 2017

Ritesh Shah is an Indian screenwriter who works in Hindi films. He has written the screenplay and dialogues for films like Kahaani (2012), Pink (2016), Airlift (2017) and Raid (2018). He won the Filmfare award, Star Screen Award and Zee Cine Award in the Best Dialogue category for Pink.

== Early life and education ==
Shah was born in Anantnag, in the Indian state of Jammu and Kashmir, into a Kashmiri family. His family was forced to migrate to Delhi during their exodus in the summer of 1990. He did his bachelor's degree in English Literature from Hindu College (1993–1996) and has done his Masters in Mass Communications from MCRC, Jamia Milia Islamia. He began his career as a playwright with Act One Art Group, New Delhi. His works include the fringe award winner Othello - A play in black and white. Ritesh switched to television in 1999. His television writing credits include Josh, Kashmeer, Krishna Arjun and the award-winning series Kagaar.

== Career ==
Ritesh started his career as a playwright in Delhi. He adopted Sławomir Mrożek's political black comedy which pulled the attention of the Indian film industry. One of the actors in the play suggested him to shift the base to Mumbai where Ritesh started writing from the TV serial Kagaar. His first film as a writer was Sujoy Ghosh's Home Delivery. Anurag Kashyap recommended him to Vipul Shah for writing the dialogues of 2007 film Namastey London. He has also adopted 2013 film B.A. Pass from a short story "The Railway Aunty" written by Mohan Sikka. Initially he was planning to turn three stories into a film from a short story collection titled Delhi Noir. Then he wrote a screenplay of 45 pages based on "The Railway Aunty" and presented it to the director Ajay Bahl who liked the script and went ahead making it a film. He has also done a cameo role in Pink.

== Awards and nominations ==
Year	Award	Category	Outcome	Work
2017	Filmfare Awards	Best Dialogue	Won	Pink
2014	Filmfare Awards	Best Screenplay (Shared with Nikkhil Advani, Suresh Nair, Niranjan Iyengar)	Nominated	D-Day
2017	Screen Awards	Best Dialogue	Won	Pink
2014	Zee Cine Awards	Best Screenplay (Shared with Nikkhil Advani, Suresh Nair, Niranjan Iyengar)	Nominated	D-Day
2017	IIFA Awards	Best Screenplay	Won	Pink
2017	IIFA Awards	Best Dialogue	Won	Pink

== Filmography ==
Year	Title	Story	Screenplay	Dialogue
2005	Home Delivery			Yes
2007	Namastey London			Yes
2007	Summer 2007			Yes
2009	Aladin	Yes		Yes
2010	Action Replayy			Yes
2011	Force	Yes	Yes	Yes
2012	Kahaani			Yes
2013	B.A. Pass	Yes	Yes	Yes
2013	Commando: A One Man Army	Yes	Yes	Yes
2013	D-Day	Yes	Yes	Yes
2014	CityLights	Yes	Yes	Yes
2014	Lai Bhaari		Yes	
2016	Airlift		Yes	Yes
2016	Rocky Handsome	Yes	Yes	Yes
2016	Te3n			Yes
2016	Madaari		Yes	Yes
2016	Pink	Yes	Yes	Yes
2016	Kahaani 2: Durga Rani Singh			Yes
2017	Commando 2: The Black Money Trail		Yes	Yes
2017	Daddy			Yes
2017	Chef	Yes	Yes	Yes
2017	Anukul			Yes
2018	Raid	Yes	Yes	Yes
2018	Namaste England	Yes		
2019	Junglee		Yes	
2019	Arjun Patiala	Yes	Yes	Yes
2019	Batla House	Yes	Yes	Yes
2021	The Big Bull			Yes
2021	Sardar Udham		Yes	Yes
2022	Dhaakad			Yes
2023	Faraaz	Yes		
2023	Lost	Yes		
2023	Kadak Singh	Yes	Yes	Yes
2025	The Diplomat	Yes	Yes	Yes
2025	Raid 2	Yes	Yes	Yes
