= Dilip Ghosh (film director) =

Indian filmmaker (born 1955)

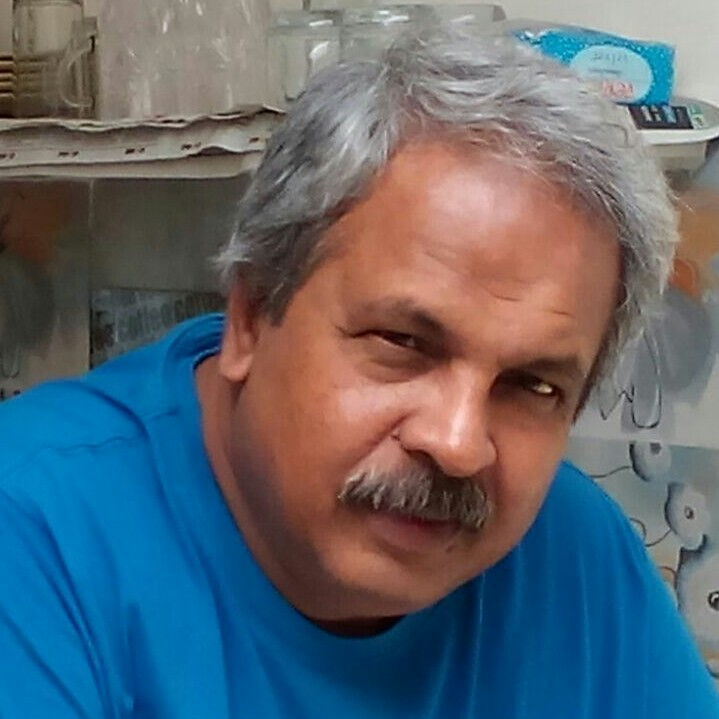
- Born: 28 August 1955 (age 71)
- Education: Film and Television Institute of India
- Occupation: Filmmaker
- Notable work: Commando, Children of the Silver Screen
- Awards: National Film Award

Dilip Ghosh is an Indian film director and producer. He received Special Mention along with Siddharth Kak, Naresh Saxena and Raj Gopal Rao in the 1990 National Film Award for his 1990 documentary Children of the Silver Screen (Hindi: Aadhi Haqueeqat Aadha Fasana). After making advertising and documentary films for over 25 years, he made his mainstream directorial debut through Commando (2013), which was a box office success.

== Career ==
=== Advertising ===
After completing his post graduate diploma in Film Direction and Screenplay Writing, he decided to make advertising films in spite of his cult status as a subversive filmmaker in the film school. Under the banner of Equinox and later Z Films, he made documentaries and hundreds of popular and some award-winning commercials for reputed clients and leading advertising agencies. His most significant contribution to Indian Advertising is the localization and the use of vernacular language in advertising films, a phenomenon which has now become the norm.

=== Children of the Silver Screen ===
During his period in advertising he had the opportunity to work with many child actors. He had observed them closely and was inspired to tell their story. This was expressed through his docu-feature film titled 'Children of the Silver Screen' (Hindi: Aadhi Haqueeqat Aadha Fasana). It was a unique exploration into the world of professional child actors. This effort fetched him a lot of honors and recognition both national and international: including the National Film Award [Special Mention]. and the Special Jury Prize at Cairo International Children Film Festival. The film was showcased in over 25 International Film Festivals.

=== Commando: A One Man Army ===
In 2013 he directed his debut feature film titled ‘Commando’, produced by Vipul Shah and Reliance Entertainment. It showed the story of a disavowed Indian commando who protects a woman from a local thug who is hellbent on forcing her to marry him. The film was a box office success and praised for its action sequences by both the critics and the audience.

== Awards ==
In 1990 he won the 38th National Film Award – Special Jury Award /Special Mention (Non-Feature Film) for his documentary Children of the Silver Screen (Hindi: Aadhi Haqueeqat Aadha Fasana).

== Filmography ==
- Passages (short) (1979)
- Night and Day Dream (short) (1980)
- In Paradise Man is born Dead (short) (1980)
- Tira Tells You Everything About Herself In Twenty Minutes (short) (1981)
- Aadhi Haqeeqat, Aadha Fasana (1990)
- Commando (2013)
