= Mannan Shaah =

Indian Music Director

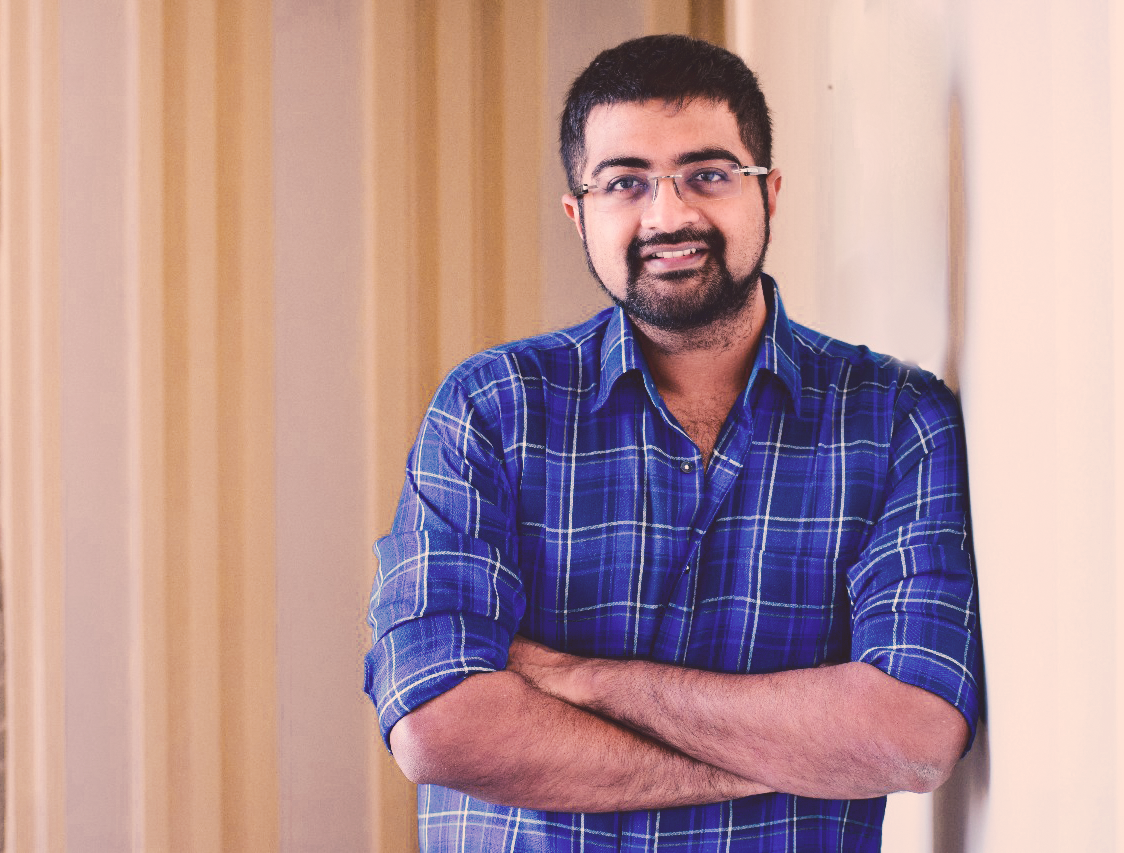

Background information
- Born: 20 September 1987 (age 39); Mumbai, India
- Origin: Nangalpur, Kutch, Gujarat, India
- Occupations: Music director, composer, singer
- Years active: 2011–present
- Labels: T-Series, Sony Music India

Mannan Shaah is an Indian film music director, singer and music composer, who predominantly works in Hindi films. He composed music for the 2018 film Namaste England, the 2017 film Commando 2: The Black Money Trail and the 2013 film Commando: A One Man Army. He also given his voice for the film Kucch Luv Jaisaa (2011).

He is known for using Indian musical instruments and recording live musical instruments for his compositions.

== Early life ==
He went to Shree Chandulal Nanavati Vinay Mandir and completed his bachelor's degree from St. Xavier's College, Mumbai. He learnt music from late Pandit Vinayak Vora and started his training in classical music at the age of five. He assisted music director Pritam for two years. He is a disciple of Ustad Ghulam Mustafa Khan.

== Career ==
In 2011, Mannan started his career as a singer with Vipul Amrutlal Shah's Kucch Luv Jaisaa and lent his voice for two songs, Thoda Sa Pyaar and Baadlon Pe Paon. In 2013, he debuted in Bollywood as music composer with Commando: A One Man Army. Later, Mannan composed music for films such as Commando 2: The Black Money Trail (2017) and Namaste England (2018). Shaah has composed the hit song Tere Dil Mein from Commando 2: The Black Money Trail, sung by Armaan Malik, was well received by audience.

== Discography ==
=== As a playback singer ===
Year	Film	Song(s)	Composer(s)	Lyrics
2011	Kucch Luv Jaisaa	"Badal Pe Paaon"	Pritam	Irshad Kamil
2011	Kucch Luv Jaisaa	"Thoda Sa Pyaar (Raghav's Search for Love)"	Pritam	Irshad Kamil
2018	Namaste England	"Ziddi Hai Dil"	Mannan Shah	Javed Akhtar

=== As a music composer ===
Key
†	Denotes films that have not yet been released

Year	Film	Song	Singer(s)	Lyrics
2013	Commando: A One Man Army	"Lutt Jawaan"	Dhruv Sangari	Mayur Puri
2013	Commando: A One Man Army	"Saawan Bairi"	Rahat Fateh Ali Khan	Mayur Puri
2013	Commando: A One Man Army	"Mungda"	Sunidhi Chauhan	Mayur Puri
2013	Commando: A One Man Army	"Lena Dena"	Daler Mehndi	Mayur Puri
2017	Commando 2: The Black Money Trail	"Commando (Title Track)"	Aditi Singh Sharma	Kumaar
2017	Commando 2: The Black Money Trail	"Commando (English Version)"	Aditi Singh Sharma	Kumaar
2017	Commando 2: The Black Money Trail	"Seedha Saadha"	Amit Mishra	Kumaar
2017	Commando 2: The Black Money Trail	"Seedha Saadha (Reprise Version)"	Jubin Nautiyal	Kumaar
2017	Commando 2: The Black Money Trail	"Tere Dil Mein"	Armaan Malik	Aatish Kapadia
2017	Commando 2: The Black Money Trail	"Tere Dil Mein (Club Mix)"	Armaan Malik	Aatish Kapadia
2018	Namaste England	"Tere Liye"	Atif Aslam, Akanksha Bhandari	Javed Akhtar
2018	Namaste England	"Tu Meri Main Tera"	Rahat Fateh Ali Khan, Shadab Faridi, Altamash Faridi, Mannan Shaah	Javed Akhtar
2018	Namaste England	"Ziddi Hai Dil"	Mannan Shah	Javed Akhtar
2018	Namaste England	"Dhoom Dhadaka"	Shahid Mallya, Antara Mitra	Javed Akhtar
2018	Namaste England	"Kya Kahoon Janeman"	Shashaa Tirupati, Mannan Shaah	Javed Akhtar
2019	Commando 3	"Akhiyaan Milavanga"	Arijit Singh, Sruthy Sasidharan	Sahil Sultanpuri
2019	Commando 3	"Main Woh Raat Hoon	Ankit Tiwari	Abhendra Kumar Upadhyay

== See also ==
- List of Indian film music directors
- List of Indian composers
