= Proper Patola =

Punjabi and Hindi film song

"Proper Patola (feat. Badshah)"

Single by Diljit Dosanjh featuring Badshah
- Language: Punjabi and Hindi
- Released: 8 August 2013 (video)
- Genre: R&B
- Length: 2:30
- Label: Sony Music India
- Songwriter: Badshah

Music video
- "Proper Patola ft. Badshah" on YouTube

"Proper Patola" is a Punjabi and Hindi song by Diljit Dosanjh and Badshah, released in 2013. The song was recreated by Badshah for the Bollywood film Namaste England.

== Creation ==
Diljit Dosanjh, Badshah and their team worked on composing this song for one year. Badshah wrote the lyrics and composed the music. Due to busy schedule of making and promotion of the Punjabi film Jatt & Juliet 2, Diljit hardly had time to work on the song, earlier this song was to be released in 2012 but because of this reason it took longer than its expected time. After the release of the movie, Diljit was ready with the song in less than 2 months.

The music video for the song was shot in Los Angeles.

== Release ==
On 8 August 2013 the song's official video was released worldwide via Sony Music India VEVO's YouTube channel. The song was released on 9 August 2013 at all major online music stores including iTunes.

== Success ==
Three weeks after the video's release it passed a million views. On the Punjabi Music TV Channel 9x Tashan this song caught the first position on Top 10 Chart. "Proper Patola" also hit the first position at iTunes India Chart by passing Honey Singh's "Bring Me Back" on 23 August 2013.

== Promotion ==
Diljit Dosanjh and Badshah decided to promote "Proper Patola" more than social network and TV, so they decided to premiere the song in movie theaters in major cities of Punjab, including Ludhiana, Amritsar, and Jalandhar.

== Namaste England version ==
"Proper Patola"

Single by Badshah featuring Aastha Gill

from the album Namaste England
- Language: Punjabi and Hindi
- Released: 3 October 2018
- Genre: Pop
- Length: 2:58
- Label: Sony Music India
- Songwriter: Badshah

Music video
- "Proper Patola - Official Video | Namaste England" on YouTube

The version remade for the soundtrack of 2018 film Namaste England, was written and performed by Badshah and Aastha Gill. The music video of the track starred Arjun Kapoor, Parineeti Chopra and Badshah.
