= Reliance Entertainment =

Indian media and entertainment company

Reliance Entertainment Pvt. Ltd.
- Formerly: Reliance BIG Entertainment (2005–2009), BIG Pictures (2005–2009), Reliance BIG Pictures (2009–2010)
- Type: Division
- Industry: Entertainment; Mass media
- Founded: 15 February 2005; 21 years ago
- Headquarters: Mumbai, Maharashtra, India
- Area served: Worldwide
- Key people: Anil Ambani (chairman); Tina Ambani (director)
- Products: Films; Web series; Animation; Digital; Gaming
- Parent: Reliance Anil Dhirubhai Ambani Group
- Website: Reliance Entertainment

Reliance Entertainment Pvt. Ltd. is an Indian media and entertainment company. It is a division of Reliance Group, handling its media and entertainment business, across content and distribution platforms. The company was founded on 15 February 2005, as two entities, namely Reliance Big Entertainment and BIG Pictures. Four years later the two companies were merged into Reliance BIG Pictures in 2009, and the company's name was changed to Reliance Entertainment the following year.

The key content initiatives are across movies, music, sports, gaming, Internet & mobile portals, leading to direct opportunities in delivery across the emerging digital distribution platforms: digital cinema, IPTV, DTH and mobile TV.

== Subsidiaries ==
=== Current ===
- Storyteller Holding Co., LLC (Amblin Partners) (investor, 20%)
  - Amblin Entertainment – Family-Friendly Label
  - DreamWorks Pictures – Mature Label
  - Amblin Television – Television Division
  - Storyteller Distribution Co. LLC – Copyright Holder
- Reliance Animation (formerly BIG Animation) – (Airtight Info media)
- Reliance Home Video & Games – Home Video Division
- Reliance BIG Music – Record Label Division
- BIG Star Entertainment Awards
- Jump Games (ParadoX Studios)
- Lava Bear Films
- Riverstone Pictures
- Reliance Games – Mobile Games Development Studio
- Reliance Media Works Ltd
  - Reliance ND Studios
  - Big Synergy – Non Fiction TV Production Division
  - Reliance MediaWorks (formerly Lowry Digital)
- Reliance Media Works Studio – Filmcity Mumbai
- Talenthouse
- Window Seat Films
- Digital Domain

=== Former ===
- IM Global – 80% sold to Tang Media Partners in 2016; merged with Open Road Films into Global Road Entertainment in 2017
  - AutoMatik (joint venture with Entertainment One)
  - IM Global Television – Television division
- Codemasters (29% owned until January 2021)
- Phantom Films – sold to Madhu Mantena and Sheetal Talwar in 2022; renamed to Phantom Studios

== History ==
- Reliance forayed into the largely untapped video rental market in India by launching Bigflix.
- The company plans to launch TV Channels.
- On 15 July 2009, Reliance and Steven Spielberg announced a joint venture with funding of $825 million.
- Big 92.7 FM launched a radio station in Singapore considering 8% of the population residing there is Indian.
- On 5 April 2010, Reliance acquired a 50% stake in Codemasters.
- On 28 May 2010, the company achieved the first ever Hollywood box office market with the release of Kites.
- Reliance co-produced director Steven Spielberg's film War Horse, which was released worldwide on Christmas Day in 2011. Many other projects from the director also have the company as a producer.
- In January 2012, it was announced that Reliance DreamWorks movies garnered 11 Oscar nominations.
- In November 2014, the company announced plans to begin the acquisition process of the North American and European mobile game studios of DreamWorks Studios in early 2015.

== Films ==
Key
†	Denotes films that have not yet been released

=== Bengali ===
Year	Name	Cast	Note(s)
2009	Shob Charitro Kalponik	Prosenjit Chatterjee, Bipasha Basu, Paoli Dam	Relationship Drama Film
2010	Abohomaan	Jisshu Sengupta, Riya Sen	Family Relation Drama Film
2013	Ganesh Talkies	Biswajit Chakraborty, Raima Sen	Family Drama Film
2013	Deewana	Jeet, Srabanti Chatterjee	Remake Of Deepavali
2013	Boss: Born to Rule	Jeet, Subhashree Ganguly	Remake Of Businessman
2014	Chotushkone	Parambrata Chatterjee, Payel Sarkar	Thriller Film
2014	Game: He Plays To Win	Jeet, Subhashree Ganguly	Remake Of Thuppakki
2014	Buno Haansh	Dev, Srabanti Chatterjee, Tanusree Chakraborty	Based On Buno Haansh (Novel)
2014	Bachchan	Jeet, Aindrita Ray, Payel Sarkar	Remake Of Vishnuvardhana
2014	Jaatishwar	Prosenjit Chatterjee, Swastika Mukherjee	Musical Drama Film
2015	Ebar Shabor	Saswata Chatterjee, Swastika Mukherjee	Based On The Detective Story "Rin"
2016	Abhimaan	Jeet, Subhashree Ganguly, Sayantika Banerjee	Remake Of Attarintiki Daredi
2022	Shonibar Bikel	Zahid Hasan, Nusrat Imroz Tisha, Mamunur Rashid	U.S. and Canadian distribution only
2023	Bagha Jatin	Dev, Sreeja Dutta, Sudipta Chakraborty	Overseas distribution
2025	Durgapur Junction	Vikram Chatterjee, Swastika Mukherjee	Distributed along with SSR Cinemas
2025	Bohurup	Soham Chakraborty, Idhika Paul	Distributed along with SSR Cinemas
2025	Devi Chowdhurani	Prosenjit Chatterjee, Srabanti Chatterjee	Distributed along with SSR Cinemas

=== Hindi ===
Year	Name	Cast	Note(s)
2008	Singh Is Kinng	Akshay Kumar, Katrina Kaif	Action Comedy Film
2008	Rock On!!	Farhan Akhtar, Arjun Rampal, Prachi Desai	Rock Musical Drama Film
2008	1920	Rajneesh Duggal, Adah Sharma	Horror Film
2008	Hulla	Rajat Kapoor, Kartika Rane	Comedy Film
2008	Karzzzz	Himesh Reshammiya, Urmila Matondkar	Remake Of Karz (1980)
2009	Luck By Chance	Farhan Akhtar, Konkona Sen Sharma, Rishi Kapoor, Sanjay Kapoor, Hrithik Roshan	Drama Film
2009	13B: Fear Has a New Address	R. Madhavan, Neetu Chandra	Psychological Horror Film
2009	Kal Kissne Dekha	Jackky Bhagnani, Nushrat Bharucha	Copied From Next
2009	Sikandar	R. Madhavan, Parzaan Dastur	Crime Drama Film
2009	Daddy Cool	Suniel Shetty, Kim Sharma	Copied From Death At A Funeral Film
2009	Do Knot Disturb	Govinda, Sushmita Sen	Remake Of The Valet
2009	Paa	Abhishek Bachchan, Vidya Balan	Comedy-Drama Film; co-produced with Amitabh Bachchan Corporation, MAD Entertainment; distributed as well
2009	3 Idiots	Aamir Khan, Kareena Kapoor	Based On Five Point Someone (Novel)
2010	Well Done Abba	Boman Irani, Minissha Lamba	Remake Of Jau Tithe Khau
2010	Aashayein	John Abraham, Sonal Sehgal	Drama Film
2010	Raavan	Abhishek Bachchan, Aishwarya Rai	Epic Adventure Film
2010	Mirch	Shreyas Talpade, Raima Sen	Drama Film
2010	Break Ke Baad	Imran Khan, Deepika Padukone	Romantic Comedy
2011	Shagird	Nana Patekar, Anurag Kashyap	Action Thriller Film
2011	Double Dhamaal	Sanjay Dutt, Kangana Ranaut, Arshad Warsi, Riteish Deshmukh, Aashish Chaudhary, Javed Jaffrey, Mallika Sherawat	Comedy Film
2011	Singham	Ajay Devgn, Kajal Aggarwal	Remake Of Singam
2011	Phhir	Rajneesh Duggal, Adah Sharma, Roshni Chopra	Romance Thriller Film
2011	Aarakshan	Amitabh Bachchan, Saif Ali Khan, Deepika Padukone, Manoj Bajpayee	Drama Film
2011	Bodyguard	Salman Khan, Kareena Kapoor	A Remake of his Body Guard (2010)
2011	Don 2	Shah Rukh Khan, Priyanka Chopra, Lara Dutta	Action Thriller Film
2012	Dangerous Ishhq	Rajneesh Duggal, Karisma Kapoor	Supernatural Thriller Film
2012	1920: The Evil Returns	Aftab Shivdasani, Tia Bajpai	Horror Film
2012	Talaash: The Answer Lies Within	Aamir Khan, Rani Mukerji, Kareena Kapoor	Psychological Horror Thriller
2013	David	Vikram, Tabu	Crime Drama Film
2013	I, Me Aur Main	John Abraham, Prachi Desai, Chitrangada Singh	Romantic Comedy Film
2013	Zanjeer	Ram Charan, Priyanka Chopra, Sanjay Dutt, Atul Kulkarni, Mahie Gill, Prakash Raj	A Remake of his Zanjeer (1973), Crime Action Drama film; Bilingual
2013	Besharam	Ranbir Kapoor, Pallavi Sharda	Action Comedy Film
2013	Commando: A One Man Army	Vidyut Jammwal, Pooja Chopra	Action Film
2013	Sooper Se Ooper	Vir Das, Kirti Kulhari	Comedy Film
2014	Total Siyapaa	Ali Zafar, Yami Gautam	Drama Film
2014	Holiday: A Soldier Is Never Off Duty	Akshay Kumar, Sonakshi Sinha	Remake Of Thuppakki
2014	Bobby Jasoos	Ali Fazal, Vidya Balan	Comedy-Drama Film
2014	Singham Returns	Ajay Devgn, Kareena Kapoor	Action Film
2015	Hawaizaada	Ayushmann Khurrana, Pallavi Sharda	Inspired By The Biography Of Shivkar Bapuji Talpade
2015	Masaan	Richa Chadha, Vicky Kaushal, Shweta Tripathi, Sanjay Mishra	Drama Film
2016	1920 London	Sharman Joshi, Meera Chopra	Horror Film
2016	Wazir	Farhan Akhtar, Aditi Rao Hydari	Crime Thriller Film
2016	Ghayal Once Again	Sunny Deol, Soha Ali Khan	Action Drama Film; co-distribution with PVR Pictures only
2016	Te3n	Nawazuddin Siddiqui, Vidya Balan	Remake Of Montage
2016	Raman Raghav 2.0	Nawazuddin Siddiqui, Sobhita Dhulipala	Neo-Noir Psychological Thriller Film
2016	Parched	Tannishtha Chatterjee, Radhika Apte, Adil Hussain, Surveen Chawla, Sayani Gupta	Drama Film
2016	Shivaay	Ajay Devgn, Sayyeshaa, Erika Kaar, Abigail Eames, Vir Das, Girish Karnad, Saurabh Shukla	Action Thriller Film
2016	Trapped	Rajkummar Rao, Geetanjali Thapa	Survival Drama Film
2017	Running Shaadi	Amit Sadh, Taapsee Pannu	Romantic Comedy Film
2017	Commando 2: The Black Money Trail	Vidyut Jammwal, Adah Sharma, Esha Gupta	Action Film
2017	Naam Shabana	Akshay Kumar, Taapsee Pannu	Action Spy-Thriller Film
2017	Golmaal Again	Ajay Devgn, Parineeti Chopra, Tabu	Supernatural Action Comedy Film
2018	1921	Karan Kundra, Zareen Khan	Horror Film
2018	Aiyaary	Sidharth Malhotra, Rakul Preet Singh, Pooja Chopra	Action Thriller Film
2018	Bhavesh Joshi Superhero	Harshvardhan Kapoor, Shreiyah Sabharwal	Vigilante Action Film; co-distribution with Eros International
2018	Vishwaroopam II	Kamal Haasan, Andrea Jeremiah	Action Film; co-distribution with Rohit Shetty Picturez of Hindi version only
2018	Namaste England	Arjun Kapoor, Parineeti Chopra	Romantic Comedy Film
2018	Simmba	Ranveer Singh, Sara Ali Khan	Inspired From Temper
2019	Super 30	Hrithik Roshan, Mrunal Thakur	Based On Anand Kumar
2019	Saand Ki Aankh	Bhumi Pednekar, Taapsee Pannu	Biopical Drama Film
2019	Commando 3	Vidyut Jammwal, Adah Sharma, Angira Dhar	Action Film
2019	Panipat	Arjun Kapoor, Sanjay Dutt, Kriti Sanon	Epic War Film
2020	Love Aaj Kal	Kartik Aaryan, Sara Ali Khan, Randeep Hooda	Romantic Drama Film
2021	The Girl on the Train	Parineeti Chopra, Aditi Rao Hydari, Avinash Tiwary, Kirti Kulhari	Mystery thriller film; distributed by Netflix
2021	Sooryavanshi	Akshay Kumar, Katrina Kaif	Action film
2021	83	Ranveer Singh, Tahir Raj Bhasin, Pankaj Tripathi	Based on 1983 Cricket World Cup
2022	Vikram Vedha	Hrithik Roshan, Saif Ali Khan and Radhika Apte	Action thriller film
2022	Cirkus	Ranveer Singh, Pooja Hegde, Jacqueline Fernandez	Uncredited; based on The Comedy of Errors
2022	Sherdil: The Pilibhit Saga	Pankaj Tripathi	
2022	Operation Romeo	Sidhant Gupta	
2022	Thai Massage	Gajraj Rao, Divyenndu, Rajpal Yadav	
2022	Code Name: Tiranga	Parineeti Chopra, Harrdy Sandhu	
2023	Bholaa	Ajay Devgn , Tabu	Co-produced with T-Series Films, Devgn Films, Dream Warrior Pictures
2023	IB71	Vidyut Jammwal, Anupam Kher	
2023	Ajmer 92	Karan Verma, Sumit Singh	
2023	The Purvanchal Files	Siddharth Pandey, Shivani Thakur	
2023	Faraaz	Zahan Kapoor, Aamir Ali, Juhi Babbar, Aditya Rawal	International distribution only
2023	Bheed	Rajkummar Rao, Bhumi Pednekar	International distribution only
2023	Afwaah	Nawazuddin Siddiqui, Bhumi Pednekar	International distribution only
2024	Singham Again	Ajay Devgn, Kareena Kapoor Khan, Deepika Padukone, Arjun Kapoor, Tiger Shroff, Akshay Kumar, Ranveer Singh	Action film

=== Tamil ===
Year	Film	Cast	Note(s)
2009	Yavarum Nalam	R. Madhavan, Neetu Chandra	Psychological Horror Film
2010	Singam	Suriya, Anushka Shetty	Action Film
2011	Yuvan Yuvathi	Bharath, Rima Kallingal	Romantic Film
2011	Osthe	Silambarasan, Richa Gangopadhyay	Remake Of Dabangg
2012	Naan Ee	Sudeep, Samantha Akkineni, Nani	Fantasy Action Film
2013	David	Vikram, Jiiva, Isha Sharvani	Drama Film; partly dubbed
2016	Irudhi Suttru	R. Madhavan, Ritika Singh	Sports Action-Drama Film
2019	Dev	Karthi, Rakul Preet Singh	Based On Road Adventure
2019	NGK	Suriya, Rakul Preet Singh	Political Action Film
2019	Game Over	Taapsee Pannu	Psychological Thriller Film
2021	Aelay	Samuthirakani	Comedy Drama film
2021	Mandela	Yogi Babu	Comedy Drama film
2021	Jagame Thandhiram	Dhanush	Action Thriller film

=== Telugu ===
Year	Name	Cast	Genre(s)
2009	Saleem	Vishnu Manchu, Ileana D'Cruz	Drama Film
2011	Money Money, More Money	Brahmanandam	Comedy Drama Film
2012	Devudu Chesina Manushulu	Ravi Teja, Ileana D'Cruz	Fantasy-Action Comedy
2012	Adhinayakudu	Nandamuri Balakrishna, Raai Laxmi	Telugu Action Drama Film
2013	Attarintiki Daredi	Pawan Kalyan, Samantha Akkineni, Pranitha Subhash	Comedy Drama Film
2013	Toofan	Ram Charan, Priyanka Chopra, Prakash Raj, Srihari, Mahie Gill	A Remake of his Zanjeer (1973) Action Crime Drama Film; Bilingual
2013	Sahasam	Gopichand, Taapsee Pannu	
2013	Bhai	Nagarjuna, Richa Gangopadhyay	Action Drama Film
2014	Manam	Nagarjuna, ANR, Naga Chaitanya, Shriya Saran, Samantha Akkineni	Fantasy-Drama Film
2014	Jump Jilani	Allari Naresh, Isha Chawla, Swathi Deekshith	Comedy Drama Film; Remake of Kalakalappu
2016	Nannaku Prematho	N. T. Rama Rao Jr., Rakul Preet Singh	Action Thriller Film
2019	Game Over	Taapsee Pannu	Psychological Thriller Film

=== Kannada ===
Year	Name	Cast	Note(s)
2010	Ijjodu	Aniruddha Jatkar, Meera Jasmine	Drama Film
2015	Rana Vikrama	Puneeth Rajkumar, Anjali, Adah Sharma	Action Thriller Film

=== Malayalam ===
Year	Name	Cast	Note(s)
2010	Kutty Srank	Mammootty, Kamalinee Mukherjee	Drama Film

=== English ===
Year	Name	Cast	Note(s)
2010	Tucker & Dale vs. Evil	Tyler Labine, Alan Tudyk	
2010	Kites	Hrithik Roshan, Bárbara Mori	Romantic Action Thriller Film
2010	Skyline	Eric Balfour, Scottie Thompson	Indian distribution only
2010	The Fighter	Christian Bale, Mark Wahlberg	Nominee of the Academy Award for Best Picture; Indian distribution only
2010	Dinner for Schmucks	Paul Rudd, Steve Carell	
2011	I Am Number Four	Alex Pettyfer, Teresa Palmer	Based On I Am Number Four (Novel)
2011	The Help	Jessica Chastain	Nominee of the Academy Award for Best Picture; Based On The Help (Novel)
2011	Fright Night	Anton Yelchin, Imogen Poots	Remake Of Fright Night
2011	War Horse	David Thewlis, Emily Watson	Nominee of the Academy Award for Best Picture; based on War Horse (novel)
2011	Scream 4	David Arquette, Neve Campbell	co-distribution with Cinergy Independent Film Services in India, Pakistan, Bangladesh, Sri Lanka, Nepal and Bhutan only
2011	Foster	Toni Collette, Ioan Gruffudd	
2011	Cowboys & Aliens	Daniel Craig, Harrison Ford	
2011	Jesus Henry Christ	Jason Spevack, Toni Collette, Michael Sheen, Samantha Weinstein	
2011	One Life	Daniel Craig	
2012	Safe	Jason Statham, Catherine Chan	Indian distribution only
2012	People Like Us	Chris Pine, Elizabeth Banks	Drama Film
2012	Dredd	Karl Urban, Lena Headey	Based on the 2000 AD comic strip Judge Dredd and its eponymous character created by John Wagner and Carlos Ezquerra
2012	Lincoln	Daniel Day-Lewis, Sally Field	Nominee of the Academy Award for Best Picture; Inspired By Team of Rivals (Book)
2013	The Last Stand	Arnold Schwarzenegger, Johnny Knoxville	Indian distribution only
2013	Bullet to the Head	Sylvester Stallone, Sung Kang	Indian distribution only
2013	Rush	Chris Hemsworth, Daniel Brühl	Indian and Pakistani distribution only
2013	The Fifth Estate	Benedict Cumberbatch, Daniel Brühl	Based On Inside Julian Assange's War on Secrecy (Book)
2013	Delivery Man	Vince Vaughn, Cobie Smulders	Remake Of Starbuck
2013	Walking with Dinosaurs	Justin Long, John Leguizamo	Inspired by Walking with Dinosaurs
2013	Paranoia	Liam Hemsworth, Gary Oldman, Amber Heard, Harrison Ford	
2014	Need for Speed	Aaron Paul, Imogen Poots	Inspired by Need for Speed (Game)
2014	The Hundred-Foot Journey	Om Puri, Helen Mirren	Based On The Hundred-Foot Journey (Novel)
2014	Enchanted Kingdom	Idris Elba	
2014	Vampire Academy	Zoey Deutch, Lucy Fry, Danila Kozlovsky, Dominic Sherwood	
2014	Locke	Tom Hardy	Indian distribution only
2015	Self/less	Ryan Reynolds, Ben Kingsley	Indian distribution only
2015	American Ultra	Kristen Stewart, Jesse Eisenberg	Indian distribution only
2015	Bridge of Spies	Tom Hanks, Amy Ryan	Nominee of the Academy Award for Best Picture; Historical Drama Film
2015	Broken Horses	Vincent D'Onofrio, Anton Yelchin, Chris Marquette	
2015	Secret in Their Eyes	Julia Roberts, Nicole Kidman, Chiwetel Ejiofor	Indian distribution only
2016	The BFG	Mark Rylance, Ruby Barnhill	Based On The BFG (Novel)
2016	The Light Between Oceans	Michael Fassbender, Alicia Vikander	Drama Romance Film
2016	The Girl on the Train	Justin Theroux, Emily Blunt	Based On The Girl on the Train (Novel)
2016	Office Christmas Party	Jason Bateman, Olivia Munn	Comedy Film
2016	The Sea of Trees	Matthew McConaughey, Ken Watanabe, Naomi Watts	Indian and Pakistani distribution only
2016	Solace	Colin Farrell, Anthony Hopkins	Indian distribution only
2017	Viceroy's House	Hugh Bonneville, Gillian Anderson	Historical Drama Film
2017	A Dog's Purpose	KJ Apa, Britt Robertson	Based On A Dog's Purpose (Novel)
2017	Ghost in the Shell	Pilou Asbæk, Scarlett Johansson	Based On Ghost in the Shell
2017	Thank You for Your Service	Miles Teller, Haley Bennett	Based On Thank You for Your Service (Book)
2018	7 Days in Entebbe	Daniel Brühl, Rosamund Pike	Indian distribution only
2018	The House with a Clock in Its Walls	Jack Black, Cate Blanchett	Based On The House with a Clock in Its Walls (Novel)
2018	Green Book	Mahershala Ali, Viggo Mortensen	Winner of the Academy Award for Best Picture; Indian and Pakistani distribution only, re-released in India on 1 March 2019
2019	A Dog's Journey	Henry Lau, Marg Helgenberger	Based On A Dog's Journey (Book)
2019	1917	George MacKay, Claire Duburcq	Nominee of the Academy Award for Best Picture; War Film
2020	Come Play	Gillian Jacobs, John Gallagher Jr., Azhy Robertson, Winslow Fegley	Based On Larry (Short Film)
2021	Finch	Tom Hanks, Caleb Landry Jones	
2022	Easter Sunday	Jo Koy, Lou Diamond Phillips	
2022	The Good House	Sigourney Weaver, Kevin Kline	
2022	The Fabelmans	Michelle Williams, Paul Dano	
2023	The Last Voyage of the Demeter	Corey Hawkins, Aisling Franciosi	
2024	Long Distance	Anthony Ramos, Naomi Scott	
2026	Hamnet	Jessie Buckley, Paul Mescal	Indian distribution only

=== French ===
Year	Name	Cast	Note(s)
2017	To the Top	Kev Adams, Vincent Elbaz	Comedy-drama film

=== Spanish ===
Year	Name	Cast	Note(s)
2010	Kites	Hrithik Roshan, Bárbara Mori	Romantic Action Thriller Film
