= Commando 2: The Black Money Trail =

2017 Indian film by Deven Bhojani

- Theatrical release poster
- Directed by: Deven Bhojani
- Written by: Ritesh Shah
- Story by: Suresh Nair
- Produced by: Vipul Shah; Dhaval Jayantilal Gada; Anil Ambani
- Starring: Vidyut Jammwal; Adah Sharma; Esha Gupta; Freddy Daruwala; Thakur Anoop Singh
- Cinematography: Chirantan Das
- Edited by: Amitabh Shukla; Sanjay Sharma
- Music by: Songs: Mannan Shaah; Gourov Roshin; Score: Prasad Sashte
- Production companies: Sunshine Pictures; Pen Studios; Reliance Entertainment
- Distributed by: Reliance Entertainment
- Release date: 3 March 2017
- Running time: 122 minutes
- Country: India
- Language: Hindi
- Budget: ₹26 crore
- Box office: ₹39.04 crore

Commando 2: The Black Money Trail (or simply Commando 2) is a 2017 Indian Hindi-language action thriller film directed by Deven Bhojani and produced by Vipul Amrutlal Shah, Dhaval Jayantilal Gada and Reliance Entertainment. Ritesh Shah wrote the script and dialogues of the film, while the story was written by Suresh Nair. The film is the second installment of the Commando film series and stars Vidyut Jammwal, Adah Sharma, Esha Gupta, Freddy Daruwala, and Thakur Anoop Singh.

Principal photography commenced on 17 February 2016. The songs were composed by Mannan Shaah and Gourov Roshin, while the score was composed by Prasad Sashte. The cinematography was handled by Chirantan Das, while the editing were handled by Amitabh Shukla and Sanjay Sharma.

Commando 2: The Black Money Trail was released on 3 March 2017 in Hindi, along with the dubbed versions of Tamil and Telugu languages. A sequel titled Commando 3 was released in 2019 with Vidyut Jammwal and Adah Sharma reprising their roles.

== Plot ==
Captain Karanveer 'Karan' Singh Dogra is assigned on a mission to eradicate black money, which has been siphoned to banks, along with his gang. Karan, along with Inspector Bhavana Reddy and ACP Bakhtawar Khan, heads to Vicky Chaddha's house, where he meets his wife Maria. The next day, a bomb blast occurs where Vicky and Maria are saved, but their daughter Tara dies. However, Maria kills her husband and tells that she is Vicky Chaddha. A cat and mouse game ensues, where Karan, Bhavana and Bakhtawar follow Vicky and defeats her army including Vicky's main henchman K.P. Though Vicky transferred the money, Karan reveals to Vicky that he had changed the history in which the money was scheduled, and that the money has actually been transferred to a replaced account, which will help the poor farmers in India. Karan also tells that this was planned from the first day itself. After the revelation, Bhavana shoots Vicky, thus completing their mission. Later, Karan receives a phone call from his superiors and is assigned for another mission.

== Cast ==
- Vidyut Jammwal as Captain Karanveer 'Karan' Singh Dogra, Para SF Commando
- Adah Sharma as Inspector Bhavna Reddy
- Esha Gupta as Maria Chaddha/ Vicky Chaddha
- Freddy Daruwala as ACP Bakhtawar Khan
- Shefali Shah as Leena Chowdhury, Minister of Home Affairs
- Kannan Arunachalam as Shrinath Iyer, Indian Embassy officer
- Thakur Anoop Singh as K.P., Vicky's henchman
- Adil Hussain as Aniruddh Roy, Karan's boss
- Suhail Nayyar as Dishank Chowdhury, Leena Chowdhury's son
- Vansh Bharadwaj as Vicky Chaddha
- Satish Kaushik as Dhariwal Ranwal
- Ivan Sylvester Rodrigues as Kamath
- Siddharth Kher as Jimmy Kher
- Avisha Sharma as Tara
- Sumit Gulati as Zafar Hussain
- Prince Rodde as 'Whisperer'
- Jeet Raidutt as Vinay

== Soundtrack ==
Commando 2

Soundtrack album by Mannan Shaah and Gourov-Roshin
- Released: 13 February 2017
- Recorded: 2016–2017
- Genre: Film soundtrack
- Length: 22:08
- Language: Hindi
- Label: T-Series
- Director: Deven Bhojani
- Producer: Vipul Amrutlal Shah

Mannan Shaah chronology
Commando: A One Man Army (2013)	Commando 2 (2017)	Namastey England (2018)

Gourov-Roshin chronology
Kaabil (2017)	Commando 2 (2017)	Mubarakan (2017)

The songs of the film have been composed by Mannan Shaah and Gourov Roshin, while the lyrics have been penned by Aatish Kapadia and Kumaar. The background score has been composed by Prasad Sashte. The soundtrack was released on 13 February 2017 by T-Series. The song "Hare Krishna Hare Ram" is a recreated version of the title track of the 2007 film Bhool Bhulaiyaa starring Akshay Kumar, which was originally composed by Pritam and lyrics written by Sameer. The music for this song was recreated by Gourov-Roshin with lyrics written by Kumaar.

Track listing
No.	Title	Lyrics	Music	Singer(s)	Length
1.	"Hare Krishna Hare Ram"	Kumaar	Pritam (Recreated by Gourov-Roshin)	Armaan Malik, Raftaar, Ritika	3:30
2.	"Tere Dil Mein"	Aatish Kapadia	Mannan Shaah	Armaan Malik	3:41
3.	"Seedha Saadha"	Kumaar	Mannan Shaah	Amit Mishra	2:58
4.	"Commando (Title Track)"	Kumaar	Mannan Shaah	Aditi Singh Sharma	2:48
5.	"Tere Dil Mein (Club Mix)"	Aatish Kapadia	Mannan Shaah	Armaan Malik	3:17
6.	"Seedha Saadha (Reprise Version)"	Kumaar	Mannan Shaah	Jubin Nautiyal	3:06
7.	"Commando (English)"	Kumaar	Mannan Shaah	Aditi Singh Sarma	2:48
Total length:					22:08

== Reception ==
=== Critical response ===
Samrudhi Ghosh of India Today gave 3/5 stars and wrote "Commando 2 does not explore a novel theme - it's the classic good vs evil - but the high-voltage action makes this an entertaining one for fans of the genre." Renuka Vyavahare of The Times of India gave 2.5/5 stars and wrote "Vidyut Jammwal is a solid action star and his stunts are the only reason you manage to sit through this never-ending tale of 'catch-Vicky Chadda-if-you-can'." Devesh Sharma of Filmfare gave 2.5/5 stars and wrote "High on action thriller with a bizarre storyline." Madhuri of Filmibeat gave 2.5/5 stars and wrote "Commando 2 is strictly for Vidyut Jammwal fans and for those who have a thing for action-fests." Surabhi Redkar of Koimoi gave 2/5 stars and wrote "Commando 2 does no justice to its name. It’s a lackluster action film with remotely riveting story." Rohit Vats of Hindustan Times gave 2/5 stars and wrote "Commando 2 lacks heart and is all muscles. If may not even quench your thirst for some adrenaline-pumping stunts." Kriti Tulsiani of News18 gave 2/5 stars and wrote "It’s a well-thought film, but not a well-woven one." Bollywood Hungama gave 2/5 stars and wrote "Commando 2 is a predictable entertainer that would appeal only to its target audience."

== Accolades ==
Award	Category	Recipient	Result
Filmfare Awards	Filmfare Award for Best Action	Franz Spilhaus	Nominated

== Game ==
Commando 2, an action mobile video game adaptation was developed by Zapak Mobile Games Pvt. Ltd. to accompany the film's release.

== Sequel ==
A sequel titled Commando 3 was released on 29 November 2019 in which Vidyut Jammwal and Adah Sharma reprise their roles.
