= Vipul Shah =

Indian writer and filmmaker (born 1967)

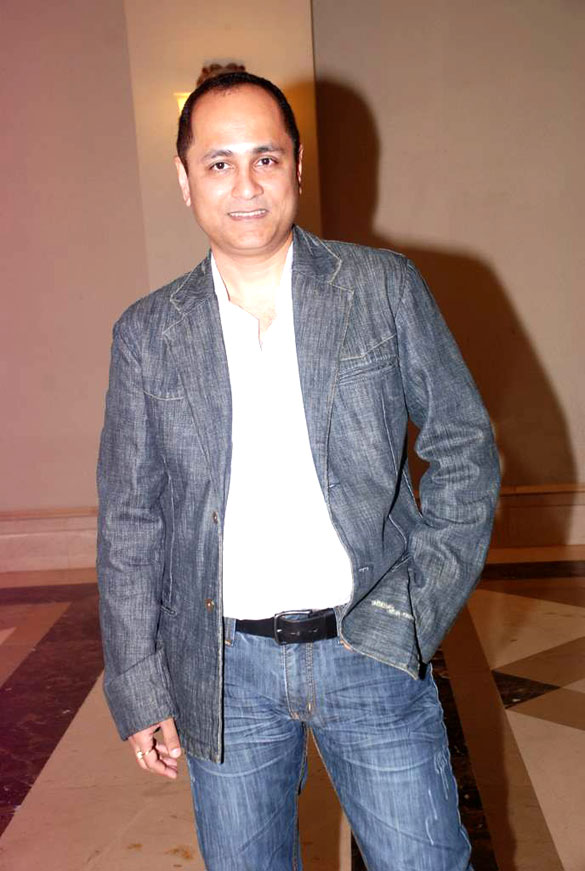
- Vipul Amrutlal Shah at the launch of his new show Bhai Bhaiya Aur Brother
- Born: Vipul Amrutlal Shah; 8 June 1967 (age 59); Kutch, Gujarat, India
- Occupations: Writer; screenwriter; film director; television director; film producer; television producer
- Spouse: Shefali Shah (m. 2000)
- Children: 2
- Website: sunshinepictures.in

Vipul Amrutlal Shah (born 8 June 1967) is an Indian writer, director and producer known for his work in Hindi and Gujarati cinema, television and theatre.

Shah is the owner of the production company Sunshine Pictures. He has directed six Hindi films, four of which have starred Akshay Kumar.

== Career ==
He began his career with Gujarati theatre. He was a part of and directed a number of Gujarati dramas, some of which were well received by the audience. He made his debut with the Gujarati film Dariya Chhoru (Children of the Ocean) in 1999, which starred JD Majethia and his future wife Shefali Shah in the lead roles.

His breakthrough on the small screen was with the soap opera Ek Mahal Ho Sapno Ka (1999), which aired on Sony Entertainment Television. The serial went on to become the longest running Indian family drama at the time and the first with over 1000 episodes.

He then made his debut in Hindi films with Aankhen, which was based on his Gujarati play Aandhlo Pato ("Blind Fold"). It was one of the five biggest hits of 2002. He then impressed the audience and critics with his next film Waqt: The Race Against Time, which was also based on a Gujarati play Aavjo Vhala Phari Malishu ("Good bye dear, will meet again"). It was also one of the highest-grossing films of 2005. His next two films Namastey London (2007) and Singh Is Kinng (2008) did very well at the box office with the latter, where he served as the producer, breaking all previous opening records in Hindi cinema. In 2009, he directed London Dreams, starring Salman Khan, Ajay Devgn and Asin Thottumkal, which was an average grosser at the box office. His 2010 release, Action Replayy starring Akshay Kumar and Aishwarya Rai, was not well received.

In March 2011, Shah announced his intention to make a sequel of his 2007 film Namastey London. It was eventually released as Namaste England in 2018.

During the MeToo movement in India in 2018, he was accused of sexual harassment by Iranian actress Elnaaz Norouzi.

He served as the producer and writer of The Kerala Story (2023), and its sequel, The Kerala Story 2 (2026).

== Personal life ==
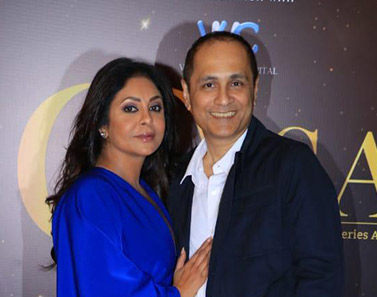
Shah with his wife Shefali Shah

He married actress Shefali Shah in 2000 and has two sons.

He studied in KC College, Mumbai.

== Filmography ==
=== Films ===
As director

Year	Film	Cast	Notes
1999	Dariya Chhoru	JD Majethia, Shefali Shah	Gujarati film; directorial debut. Written by Prakash Kapadia.
2002	Aankhen	Amitabh Bachchan, Sushmita Sen, Akshay Kumar, Arjun Rampal, Paresh Rawal	Based on Shah's Gujarati play Aandhlo Pato ("Blind Fold").
2005	Waqt: The Race Against Time	Amitabh Bachchan, Akshay Kumar, Priyanka Chopra, Shefali Shah	Based on the Gujarati play Aavjo Vhala Phari Malishu ("Good bye dear, will meet again") by Aatish Kapadia.
2007	Namastey London	Akshay Kumar, Katrina Kaif	
2009	London Dreams	Salman Khan, Ajay Devgn, Asin	
2010	Action Replayy	Akshay Kumar, Aishwarya Rai	Adaptation of his Gujarati play of the same name.
2018	Namaste England	Arjun Kapoor, Parineeti Chopra	Sequel to Namastey London.

As producer

Year	Film	Director	Cast
2002	Aankhen	Himself	Amitabh Bachchan, Akshay Kumar, Sushmita Sen, Arjun Rampal, Paresh Rawal
2005	Waqt: The Race Against Time	Himself	Amitabh Bachchan, Akshay Kumar, Priyanka Chopra, Shefali Shah
2007	Namastey London	Himself	Akshay Kumar, Katrina Kaif
2008	Singh Is Kinng	Anees Bazmee	Akshay Kumar, Katrina Kaif
2009	London Dreams	Himself	Salman Khan, Ajay Devgn, Asin
2010	Action Replayy	Himself	Akshay Kumar, Aishwarya Rai
2011	Kucch Luv Jaisaa	Barnali Ray Shukla	Shefali Shah, Rahul Bose, Sumeet Raghavan
2011	Force	Nishikant Kamat	John Abraham, Genelia D'souza, Vidyut Jammwal, Raj Babbar
2013	Commando: A One Man Army	Dilip Ghosh	Vidyut Jammwal, Pooja Chopra, Jaideep Ahlawat
2014	Holiday: A Soldier Is Never Off Duty	A. R. Murugadoss	Akshay Kumar, Sonakshi Sinha, Freddy Daruwala, Sumeet Raghavan
2016	Force 2	Abhinay Deo	John Abraham, Sonakshi Sinha, Tahir Raj Bhasin, Raj Babbar
2017	Commando 2: The Black Money Trail	Deven Bhojani	Vidyut Jammwal, Adah Sharma, Freddy Daruwala, Esha Gupta
2018	Namaste England	Himself	Arjun Kapoor, Parineeti Chopra
2019	Commando 3	Aditya Datt	Vidyut Jammwal, Adah Sharma, Gulshan Devaiah
2021	Sanak	Kanishk Varma	Vidyut Jammwal, Rukmini Maitra, Neha Dhupia, Chandan Roy Sanyal
2023	The Kerala Story	Sudipto Sen	Adah Sharma, Yogita Bihani, Sonia Balani, Siddhi Idnani
2024	Bastar: The Naxal Story	Sudipto Sen	Adah Sharma, Shilpa Shukla, Yashpal Sharma, Subrat Dutta, Raima Sen, Indira Tiwari
2026	The Kerala Story 2	Kamakhya Narayan Singh	Ulka Gupta, Aditi Bhatia, Aishwarya Ojha

As writer

Year	Film	Director	Notes
2002	Aankhen	Himself	Based on Shah's Gujarati play Aandhlo Pato ("Blind Fold"). Adapted by Shah, Aatish Kapadia and Shobhana Desai.
2023	The Kerala Story	Sudipto Sen	Written with Suryapal Singh and Sen.
2024	Bastar: The Naxal Story	Sudipto Sen	Written with Amarnath Jha and Sen.

=== Television ===
Year(s)	Show	Role
1995	Jeevan Mrityu	Director
1998	Alpviram	Director
1999–2002	Ek Mahal Ho Sapno Ka	Director
2001	Hum Pardesi Ho Gaye	Writer, producer
2012	Bhai Bhaiya Aur Brother	Producer
2014–2015	Pukaar – Call For The Hero	Producer
2022	Human	Director, producer
2023	Commando	Director, producer

== Theatre ==
Year	Play	Role	Notes
—	Aandhlo Pato ("Blind Fold")	Writer, director	Adapted by Shah as the film Aankhen (2002).
1994	Action Replayy	Writer, director	Adapted by Shah as the film Action Replayy (2010). Shobhana Desai has also been credited as the writer.
