= Commando 3 (film) =

2019 Indian film by Aditya Datt

- Theatrical release poster
- Directed by: Aditya Datt
- Written by: Darius Yarmil; Junaid Wasi
- Produced by: Vipul Shah; Anil Ambani; Motion Picture Capital
- Starring: Vidyut Jammwal; Gulshan Devaiah; Adah Sharma; Angira Dhar
- Cinematography: Mark Hamilton
- Edited by: Sandeep Kurup
- Music by: Songs: Mannan Shaah; Vikram Montrose; Score: Saurabh Bhalerao
- Production companies: Sunshine Pictures; Reliance Entertainment; Motion Picture Capital
- Distributed by: Reliance Entertainment
- Release date: 29 November 2019
- Running time: 134 minutes
- Country: India
- Language: Hindi
- Box office: ₹40.15 crore

Commando 3 is a 2019 Indian Hindi-language action thriller film directed by Aditya Datt and produced by Vipul Amrutlal Shah and Reliance Entertainment. The film is the third film of Commando franchise following Commando (2013) and Commando 2 (2017). It stars Vidyut Jammwal, with Gulshan Devaiah as the antagonist, alongside Adah Sharma and Angira Dhar. In the film, Karan goes undercover with Bhavana Reddy for an anti-terrorist mission in London.

Filming commenced in September 2018 in Bradford and York City in England. The film was earlier planned to release in September 2019. It was finally released in cinemas on 29 November 2019. The film is the highest-grossing film in the Commando film series, but was not much commercially successful due to its budget.

== Plot ==
The Mumbai Police force arrest three young terrorist suspects and interrogate them, but obtain no useful information. Karanveer "Karan" Singh Dogra is called in to assist, but one suspect commits suicide. Further investigation reveals that the suspects received money and VHS tapes containing a terrorist's message. One repeatedly mentions 9/11, which Karan interprets as a reference to an attack on India during Deepavali. Discovering that the recordings were made in London, Karan travels there undercover with Bhavana Reddy, who assisted him on his previous mission. Posing as a married couple, they meet MI6 officer Mallika Sood, who takes them to their workstation, where fellow agent Armaan Akhtar assists them.

Meanwhile, British terrorist Buraq Ansari forces his son Abeer to watch him murder a man. Abeer's mother and Buraq's ex-wife, Zahira, wants to contact the police, but Buraq threatens her. Learning that two Indian agents have arrived in London to capture him, Buraq sends his operatives to track them, while Karan and his team investigate Buraq's associates. During a pursuit, Karan encounters Zahira and Abeer before chasing a suspect by motorbike. The suspect dies accidentally, and Karan retrieves his phone, answering a call from Buraq and warning him that he will visit the dead man's house. When Karan and his team arrive, Buraq's henchmen confront them, triggering a fight that ends with Karan being thrown from the house by an explosion. The incident goes viral, as does Bhavana's tweet supporting him.

The apparent setback is part of Karan's plan. He releases a video challenging Buraq without revealing his identity. When Buraq's DNA matches that of a murder suspect, Karan and his team head to Buraq's restaurant, only to discover that he has already left. Anticipating that Buraq will collect Abeer from school, Karan goes there and confronts him, but Buraq escapes.

Back in Mumbai, the two remaining suspects are reformed by an Imam. Meanwhile, Buraq's reluctance to abandon Abeer exposes his vulnerability. Karan holds a press conference with Abeer and Zahira, publicly revealing Buraq's crimes. As the pair are escorted to the airport, Buraq's henchmen attack their convoy. Bhavana is knocked unconscious in the ensuing crash, while Karan and Mallika fight off the attackers. Zahira and Abeer are nevertheless kidnapped, and Mallika learns that Buraq has surrendered.

Karan attempts to interrogate Buraq but resorts to violence, prompting the authorities to order him and Bhavana to leave London within 24 hours or face deportation. Buraq secures his release through a deal with MI6, offering evidence of the planned attack in exchange for his freedom. While being escorted to a safe house, he asks the officers to stop at a mosque, where he switches places with a henchman and murders Zahira. Karan realises that the attack will take place on Dussehra, rather than Deepavali. Determined to stop it, he continues the mission despite the order to leave, and his team joins him.

Using Abeer's tablet, the agents locate the safe house. Bhavana and Mallika lead the assault to rescue Abeer, while Karan pursues Buraq. After killing the remaining henchmen in a fight, Karan incapacitates Buraq with an injection and takes him into custody. Bhavana and Mallika rescue Abeer, and Karan is collected by his agency's helicopter and escorted to India's cargo ship.

With little time remaining before the planned attacks, Karan and the police work to identify the targeted cities. By decoding a phrase Buraq repeatedly utters, Karan determines the targets and releases a video urging India's Muslims to recognise the importance of religious unity. Muslim communities mobilise to confront the terrorists, joined by the police, and the attackers are arrested. Enraged by Buraq's crimes, Karan kills him and entrusts Abeer to the father of the man Buraq murdered.

== Cast ==
- Vidyut Jammwal as Commando Karanveer 'Karan' Singh Dogra
- Adah Sharma as Senior Inspector Bhavana Reddy, Anti-Terrorism Squad
- Angira Dhar as British Intelligence Agent Mallika Sood
- Gulshan Devaiah as Buraq Ansari, Zahira's ex-husband and Abeer's father
- Sumeet Thakur as British Intelligence Agent Armaan Akhtar
- Rajesh Tailang as Roy, Karan's boss
- Virendra Saxena as Ahmed
- Saahil Krishnani as Saahil
- Vibhawari Deshpande as Rajani
- Feryna Wazheir as Zahira, Buraq's ex-wife and Abeer's mother
- Abrar Zahoor as Tabish, Buraq's henchman
- Suresh Vishwakarma as Inspector Tukaram Tambe
- Abhilash Chaudhary as Taimur Khan
- Manuj Sharma as Subhan
- Raghav Dheer as Umar/Rakesh
- Prashant Jha as Usman/Amit
- Mark Bennington as Alvin, Mallika's boss
- Atharva Vishwakarma as Abeer, Buraq and Zahira's son
- R.Bhakti Klein as British Intelligence Agent
- Gracy Goswami as School student

== Production ==
=== Development ===
The success of first two Commando series made the producer Vipul Amrutlal Shah to go for third franchise. On 6 September 2018 it was announced to start Commando 3 with Vidyut Jammwal.

=== Filming ===
Later in September filming began in London, England. The filming wrapped up in mid June 2019.

== Soundtrack ==
Commando 3

Soundtrack album by Mannan Shaah and Vikram Montrose
- Released: 5 November 2019
- Recorded: 2018–19
- Genre: Feature film soundtrack
- Length: 15:28
- Language: Hindi
- Label: Zee Music Company
External audio
- Official Audio Jukebox on YouTube

This music of the film is composed by Mannan Shaah and Vikram Montrose with lyrics written by Sahil Sultanpuri, Abhendra Kumar Upadhyay, Azeem Shirazi, Farhad Bhiwandiwala and Vikram Montrose. The track "Iraade Kar Buland" is believed to be inspired from "Believer" by Imagine Dragons

Track listing
| No. | Title | Lyrics | Music | Singer(s) | Length |
|---|---|---|---|---|---|
| 1. | "Tera Baap Aaya" | Farhad Bhiwandiwala, Vikram Montrose | Vikram Montrose | Farhad Bhiwandiwala | 2:44 |
| 2. | "Akhiyaan Milavanga" | Sahil Sultanpuri | Mannan Shaah | Arijit Singh, Sruthy Sasidharan | 5:02 |
| 3. | "Iraade Kar Buland" | Vikram Montrose, Azeem Shirazi | Vikram Montrose | Sukhwinder Singh, Vikram Montrose | 3:48 |
| 4. | "Main Woh Raat Hoon" | Abhendra Kumar Upadhyay | Mannan Shaah | Ankit Tiwari | 3:54 |
| Total length: | | | | | 15:28 |

== Release ==
=== Theatrical ===
The film was released on 29 November 2019.

=== Home media ===
It was made available on ZEE5 starting on 20 February 2020.

== Box office ==
Commando 3's opening day domestic collection was ₹4.74 crore. On the second day, the film collected ₹5.64 crore. On the third day, the film collected ₹7.95 crore, taking the total opening weekend collection to ₹18.33 crore.

The film has a gross collection of ₹38.65 crore in India and ₹1.50 crore overseas, making a worldwide gross collection of ₹40.15 crore.

=== Awards and nominations ===
The Andy Long stunt team, Amin, and Varma were nominated for the Filmfare Award for Best Action.
