= Sejal Shah =

Indian cinematographer

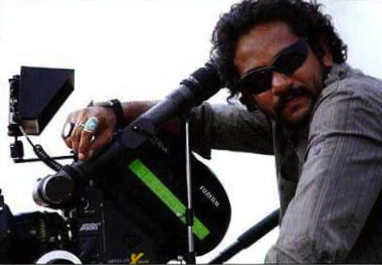
- Born: Mumbai, Maharashtra, India
- Occupation: Cinematographer

Sejal Shah is an Indian cinematographer. He has worked on a number of Bollywood films and advertisements.

== Career ==
Shah has done more than 250 commercials, including for major brands such as Indian Oil, Sprite, Royal Stag, Hyundai, Ford Endeavour, Black Berry, Honda, and Nokia. His debut feature, Silence Please... The Dressing Room was based on the film Match Fixing.

== Filmography ==
=== As cinematographer ===
- Kaali Khuhi – (Hindi, 2020)
- Solo – One Episode – (Tamil / Malayalam, 2017)
- War Chod Na Yaar – (Hindi, 2013)
- Commando: A One Man Army – (Hindi, 2013)
- Bodyguard – (Hindi, 2011)
- Action Replayy – (Hindi, 2010)
- Ramaa: The Saviour – (2010)
- London Dreams – (Hindi, 2009)
- Missed Call – (English, 2005)
- Silence Please... The Dressing Room – (2004)

== Awards and nominations ==
- Nominated – 5th Apsara Film & Television Producers Guild Awards for Best Cinematography (2009) – London Dreams
