= Adah Sharma =

Indian actress (born 1992)

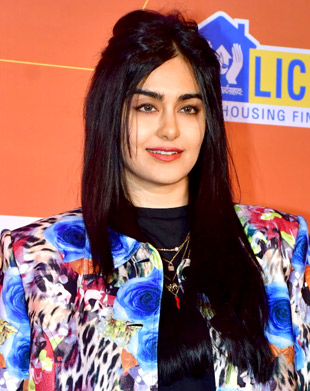
- Sharma in 2025
- Born: 11 May 1992 (age 34); Mumbai, Maharashtra, India
- Other names: Chamundeswari Lakshmi Narasimhan Sundaresan Iyer, Adah Sarma (Note: In a Times of India interview she stated that her original name was Adah Sarma, the surname being changed to Sharma keeping inline with the standard spelling in Mumbai. Though in a 2023 interview with Hauterrfly she stated her original name to be Chamundeswari Iyer, the change to Adah Sharma being due to the perceived difficult pronunciation of the name.)
- Occupation: Actress
- Years active: 2008–present

Adah Sharma (born 11 May 1992) (pronounced [ˈʌdə ʃəɾmaː]), is an Indian actress who appears predominantly in Hindi and Telugu films. She is best known for being the main lead of The Kerala Story, which made ₹375 crore at the box office making it India's highest-grossing female-led film of all time.

Sharma, after finishing her schooling, made her acting debut with a leading role in the 2008 Hindi horror film, 1920, a box office success. Her portrayal of a possessed woman in the film was critically praised and earned her a Filmfare Award for Best Female Debut nomination. After the release of her romantic comedy film, Hasee Toh Phasee (2014), she ventured into the South Indian film industry, playing the leading lady in the Telugu film, Heart Attack (2014). Her other major Telugu films include, S/O Satyamurthy (2015) and Kshanam (2016). She also starred as the lead actress in the film The Kerala Story (2023).

== Early life ==
Sharma was born in Mumbai. Her father S. L. Sharma (d. 2014), a Tamil Brahmin, hailed from Madurai, Tamil Nadu and was a captain in the Indian Merchant Navy. Her mother Sheila Sharma, a Malayali and native of Nattupura, Palakkad, Kerala, is an Indian classical dancer and mallakhamba yoga practitioner.

Sharma studied at Auxilium Convent High School in Bandra. When she was in tenth grade, she had decided that she wanted to become an actress. She wanted to drop out of school but her parents insisted that she should complete her schooling at least. After completing her twelfth grade, she stopped studying.

Sharma is a gymnast. She has been dancing since the age of three, and has completed her graduation in Kathak from the Natraj Gopi Krishna Kathak Dance Academy in Mumbai. She had learnt salsa for four months in the US, besides jazz and ballet, and has claimed to be "very good" at belly dancing. She is also a practitioner of Silambam, an Indian weapon-based martial art.

Sharma has lived in her Pali Hill house all her life, as she preferred to live close to nature surrounded by trees. In June 2024, she moved to a sea-facing building Mont Blanc in Mumbai which had previously been occupied by Sushant Singh Rajput.

Apart from her mother tongue Tamil, Sharma can speak in English, Marathi, and Hindi, as she was born and brought up in Mumbai.

== Career ==
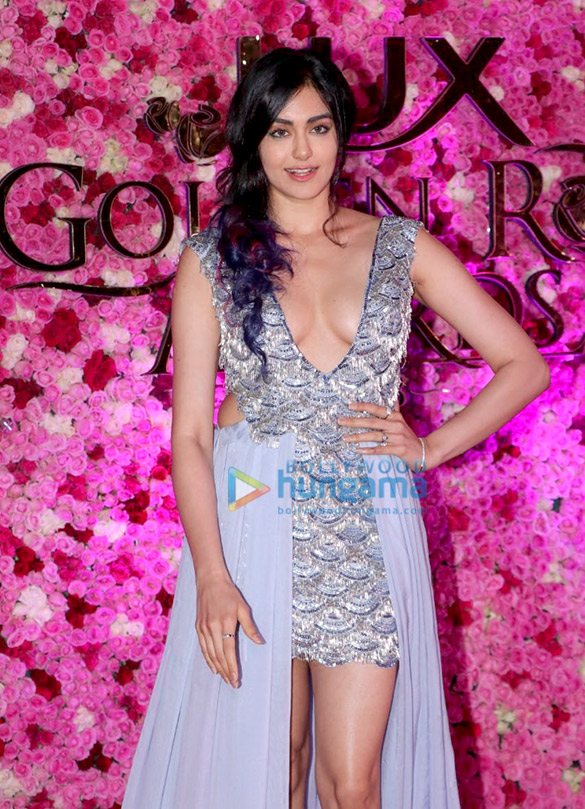
Sharma in 2018

Trying to break into the film industry, Sharma auditioned for several roles, but was rejected either because of her curly hair or because the casting directors felt that she looked too young. At the age of 16, she landed the lead female role in the 2008 Hindi horror film 1920 opposite Rajneesh Duggal which was directed by Vikram Bhatt. Her portrayal of a possessed woman was unanimously praised by critics. The Times of India's Nikhat Kazmi commented that she "delivers a consummate performance", and labelled her performance as "excellent", "[exceptionally] brilliant", and "incredibly convincing". The film was a commercial success, Bhatt's first box office hit after six years and 10 films, and earned Sharma a Best Female Debut nomination at the 54th Filmfare Awards. Three years later, she had her next release, Phhir, again a horror film, which saw her collaborating with Vikram Bhatt, who wrote the film, and her, 1920 co-star Rajneesh Duggal. Phhir, however, was not as well received as, 1920, opening to negative reviews, and failing at the box office, with Sharma getting mixed response for her performance. While Sujata Chakrabarti wrote that "not even for a minute does she exude the intensity of being a psychic", Sify's Sonia Chopra stated that she was "the only one in the film who can act". Her third film, the romantic comedy Hum Hai Raahi Car Ke, released another two years later and was a critical and financial failure.

In 2014, Sharma had two releases: Puri Jagannadh's romance Heart Attack opposite Nithiin, that marked her Telugu debut and a Hindi film Hasee Toh Phasee alongside Sidharth Malhotra and Parineeti Chopra, which released seven days later and featured her in a supporting role. Taran Adarsh of Bollywood Hungama stated, "Adah Sharma is a natural. One strongly feels she hasn't got her due, despite leaving an impression in every film she's featured in." She described her character in the former as "vulnerable, yet extremely sexy" and worked for two months on her Telugu diction. Sharma received positive remarks for her performance in Heart Attack, with The Times of India writing that she "looks like a natural actress and does a decent job" while 123telugu.com felt that she had made a "stunning debut". Both films were commercially successful, with Hasee To Phasee ending up as one of the highest-grossing Hindi films of 2014.

Her next two films, the Telugu family drama S/O Satyamurthy, in which she was cast opposite Allu Arjun and Samantha Ruth Prabhu, and was directed by Trivikram Srinivas, and the Pavan Wadeyar's action thriller Rana Vikrama, alongside Puneeth Rajkumar and Anjali, her first Kannada project, released on consecutive days in April 2015. Both films were financial successes as well, with the former, having collected over ₹ 80 crore, emerging as one of the highest-grossing Telugu films of all time, in spite of receiving mixed reviews from critics. For her next film, she was paired opposite Sai Dharam Tej in Subramanyam for Sale, a Telugu romantic comedy. Directed by Harish Shankar, the film proved to be a moderate success, and Sharma received good reviews for her performance. At the 5th edition of Indian Federation for Fashion Development's India Runway Week, Sharma dazzled in a beautiful lehenga as she walked the ramp for Shravan Kumar. The designer kept the collection region-specific and showcased the lesser known handlooms of the south.

Sharma had three releases in February 2016, two of which were in Telugu language. Her first film, the romantic comedy Garam was directed by Madan and she was cast as the love interest of the character played by Aadi. Her next film was the acclaimed thriller Kshanam where she played the central role of Swetha, who seeks help from her ex-boyfriend (Adivi Sesh). Her final release of the year was the romantic comedy Idhu Namma Aalu, her first Tamil film, in which she had a small role and also performed an item number on the song "King Kong", which topped the charts in South India and her dance moves as well as pairing with Silambarasan was praised. Her next release was the thriller Commando 2, a sequel to the 2013 film Commando: A One Man Army, where she plays the female lead role of an inspector opposite Vidyut Jammwal. Commercially, the film was an average-grosser. In 2020, she played the role of a transgender woman in a MX Player webseries titled Pati Patni Aur Panga.

In 2023, she starred in the lead role in The Kerala Story, in which she played the role of Shalini Unnikrishnan/Fathima Ba. Anuj Kumar of The Hindu noted, "Adah Sharma delivers an earnest performance and captures the pain of the vulnerable Shalini who is robbed of her innocence but retains her spine." The film became the ninth-highest-grossing Hindi film of 2023. Her next project was Bastar: The Naxal Story (2024), by the makers of The Kerala Story.

In an interview to NDTV, Sharma shared her views on pervasive nepotism in the film industry calling it "a huge rock wall" which sometimes an outsider gets through, by finding small cracks. She called The Kerala Story one such crack that bagged her huge success.

== Filmography ==
=== Films ===
Key
†	Denotes films that have not yet been released

Year	Title	Role	Language	Notes
2008	1920	Lisa Singh Rathod	Hindi	
2011	Phhir	Disha Malhotra	Hindi	
2013	Hum Hai Raahi Car Ke	Sanjana Mehra	Hindi	
2014	Heart Attack	Hayati	Telugu	
2014	Hasee Toh Phasee	Karishma Solanki	Hindi	
2015	S/O Satyamurthy	Pallavi Kolasani	Telugu	
2015	Rana Vikrama	Paaru	Kannada	
2015	Subramanyam for Sale	Durga	Telugu	
2016	Garam	Sameera	Telugu	
2016	Kshanam	Swetha	Telugu	
2016	Idhu Namma Aalu	Unnamed	Tamil	Special appearance in song "Maaman Waiting"
2017	Commando 2	Inspector Bhavna Reddy	Hindi	
2019	Charlie Chaplin 2	Saara	Tamil	
2019	Kalki	Dr. Padma	Telugu	
2019	Bypass Road	Radhika Nair	Hindi	
2019	Commando 3	Inspector Bhavna Reddy	Hindi	
2023	Question Mark	Swapna	Telugu	
2023	Selfiee	Meera	Hindi	
2023	The Kerala Story	Shalini Unnikrishnan / Fathima Ba	Hindi	
2024	Bastar: The Naxal Story	I.G. Neerja Mathur	Hindi	
2024	C.D: Criminal or Devil	Raksha	Telugu	
2025	Tumko Meri Kasam	Indira Murdia	Hindi	
2026	Governor	Aditi Verma	Hindi	
2026	Haatak †	Shivranjani Acharya	Hindi	Filming
2026	Super Velli †	TBA	Hindi	Pre-production
2026	Ramarasa †	TBA	Kannada	

=== Television ===
Key
†	Denotes series that have not yet been released

Year	Title	Role	Language	Network	Notes	Ref
2014–2015	Pukaar	Aarti	Hindi	Life OK		
2019	The Holiday	Mehek	Hindi	Amazon Prime		
2020	Pati Patni Aur Panga	Shivani Bhatnagar	Hindi	MX Player		
2021	Aisa Waisa Pyaar	Sweta Sahu	Hindi	JioCinema		
2022	Meet Cute	Shalini	Telugu	SonyLIV	under segment "Star struck"	
2023	Commando	Bhavana Reddy	Hindi	Disney+ Hotstar		
2024	Sunflower	Rosie Mehta	Hindi	ZEE5		
2024–present	Reeta Sanyal	Reeta	Hindi	Disney+ Hotstar		

=== Short films ===
Year	Title	Role	Language	Ref
2019	Tindey	Sridevi	Hindi	
2019	Moh	Shruti	Hindi	
2020	Soulsathi	Preeti / Soul	Hindi	
2021	Chuha Billi	Kats	Hindi	
2022	Which Side Are You?	Reeva	Hindi	
2023	Kofuku	Sadaf	Hindi	

=== Music video appearances ===
Year	Title	Language	Singer(s)	Ref
2006	"Tasveeran"	Punjabi	Sardool Sikandar	
2010	"Gaaia Na Kar Ni"	Punjabi	Kamal Heer	
2017	"Life"	Punjabi	Akhil	
2020	"Tu Yaad Aya"	Hindi	Adnan Sami	
2021	"Drunk N High"	Hindi	Aastha Gill, Mellow D	
2021	"Sorry Sorry"	Hindi	Raashi Sood	
2021	"Aashiq Mud Na Jaawe"	Punjabi	Akhil	
2021	"Ramasakkanodiviro Pilago"	Telugu	Mangli, Raghu Kunche	
2022	"Piya Re Piya"	Hindi	Yasser Desai	
2023	"Raabta"	Hindi	Jubin Nautiyal	
2024	"Shiv Tandav Stotram"	Sanskrit	Adah Sharma	

== Awards and nominations ==
Year	Award	Category	Work	Result	Ref
2009	Screen Awards	Most Promising Debut Actress	1920	Nominated	
2009	Stardust Awards	Exciting New Face – Female	1920	Won	
2009	Filmfare Award for Best Female Debut	Filmfare Award for Best Female Debut	1920	Nominated	
2024	Iconic Gold Awards	Best Actress of the Year – Critics Choice	The Kerala Story	Won	
2024	Zee Cine Awards	Zee 5 Best Actor – Female	The Kerala Story	Won	

== See also ==
- List of Indian film actresses
- List of Hindi film actresses
