= Commando: A One Man Army =

2013 Indian film by Dilip Ghosh

- Film poster
- Directed by: Dilip Ghosh
- Written by: Ritesh Shah
- Produced by: Vipul Amrutlal Shah
- Starring: Vidyut Jammwal; Pooja Chopra; Jaideep Ahlawat
- Cinematography: Sejal Shah
- Edited by: Amitabh Shukla
- Music by: Songs: Mannan Shaah; Score: Prasad Sasthe
- Production companies: Sunshine Pictures; Reliance Entertainment
- Distributed by: Reliance Entertainment
- Release date: 12 April 2013
- Running time: 124 minutes
- Country: India
- Language: Hindi
- Budget: ₹17 crore
- Box office: ₹27 crore (India)

Commando: A One Man Army is a 2013 Indian Hindi-language action thriller film directed by Dilip Ghosh and produced by Vipul Amrutlal Shah and Reliance Entertainment. It is the first installment of Commando film series. The film features Vidyut Jammwal, Pooja Chopra and Jaideep Ahlawat. Jammwal, who is trained in Kalaripayattu, performs martial arts in the film's action sequences.

Commando: A One Man Army was released on 12 April 2013. It was followed by two sequels titled Commando 2 (2017) and Commando 3 (2019).

== Plot ==
Karan Singh Dogra, a Para SF Captain in Indian Army, is captured by Chinese officials when his helicopter crashes on the Chinese border during a routine training exercise. Karan and his seniors are unable to convince the Chinese of the former's innocence. The Chinese decide to brand Karan as a spy to defame India internationally. Feeling the Chinese won't comply, the Government of India orders to erase Karan's record and identity and deny his existence. Karan is tortured for a year by the Chinese Army, but he later escapes while being taken to the Chinese military court. Karan runs into a woman, Simrit, who is running away from the gang of Amrit Knawel "AK-74" Singh, a notorious gangster.

Karan rescues her by fighting off goons headed by AK-74's brother, where he decides to escort Simrit out of the town for her safety, but finds himself surrounded by AK-74 and his goons at a bridge. Outnumbered and outgunned, Karan jumps into the river along with Simrit, who later explains that AK-74 wants to marry her for political gains. Simrit reveals that AK-74 has total control over her hometown, where he rules her hometown through fear. Karan decides to help Simit. AK-74 uses his resources to pursue the duo into the jungle, where Karan uses his expertise in guerilla warfare to fight AK-74's men.

After a long chase, Karan is caught by AK-74, who shoots Karan and throws him off a cliff. Later, AK-74 kills Simrit's parents as a warning. Karan, having survived the fall, goes after AK-74. After combating his henchmen and also an assassin Thebe sent by the Chinese, Karan defeats AK-74 and rescues Simrit. Karan takes the captured AK-74 to the town square, where he is almost thwarted by the cops who work for AK-74, but Karan is saved in time by his ex-superior officer Col. Akhilesh Sinha. Karan proceeds to hang and kill AK-74, where he asks the people to be fearless and not be afraid of people like AK-74. Karan surrenders himself to Col. Sinha, where he tells his name to Simrit and promises to be back.

== Cast ==
- Vidyut Jamwal as Captain Karanveer "Karan" Singh Dogra, Para SF
- Pooja Chopra as Simrit Kaur
- Jaideep Ahlawat as Amrit 'AK-74' Kanwal Singh
- Jagat Rawat as MP Mahendra Pratap
- Darshan Jariwala as Col. Akhilesh Sinha, Karan's commanding officer
- Baljinder Kaur
- Nathan Barris as Theba

== Soundtrack ==
The music was composed by Mannan Shaah, with lyrics penned by Mayur Puri, while the background score has been scored by Prasad Sasthe. The soundtrack album was released on 28 March 2013 as a digital download on ITunes and Amazon.

Commando – A One Man Army

Soundtrack album by Mannan Shaah
- Released: 28 March 2013
- Recorded: 2012–2013
- Genre: Feature film soundtrack, Soundtrack
- Length: 24:10
- Language: Hindi
- Label: Super Cassettes Industries Ltd.

Mannan Shaah chronology
Commando – A One Man Army (2013)	Commando 2 (2017)

Track listing
No.	Title	Lyrics	Singer(s)	Length
1.	"Lutt Jawaan"	Mayur Puri	Dhruv Sangari	4:48
2.	"Saawan Bairi"	Mayur Puri	Rahat Fateh Ali Khan	5:20
3.	"Mungda"	Mayur Puri	Sunidhi Chauhan	5:10
4.	"Lena Dena"	Mayur Puri	Daler Mehndi	5:10
Total length:				24:10

== Release ==
Commando: A One Man Army was released on 12 April 2013.

== Reception ==
Commando: A One Man Army received mixed to positive reviews from critics with praise for Vidyut Jammwal's performance and action choreography.

=== Critical response ===
Taran Adarsh of Bollywood Hungama gave 3.5/5 stars and wrote "Commando: A One Man Army is vintage good versus evil saga in a strikingly new avatar. A high-voltage action fare that's racy, pulsating and packed with some adrenaline-pumping stunts." Meena Iyer of The Times of India gave 3.5/5 stars and wrote "If you are an action junkie and if you have peaked on Sylvester Stallone’s Rambo-series, then our desi Commando, is what you will term paisa-vasool entertainment."

Koimoi gave 2.5/5 stars and wrote "Commando is an out and out Vidyut Jamwal film that provides him with the platform to showcase his martial arts genius with immense aplomb and in full volumes." Hindustan Times gave 2.5/5 stars and wrote "If you’re an action fan, Commando – A One Man Army gives you enough bang for the buck."

Alisha Coelho of In.com gave 2.5/5 stars and wrote "Commando – A One Man Army is a one man show where Vidyut carries the entire weight on his shoulders." Saibal Chatterjee of NDTV gave 2/5 stars and wrote "Despite all the bravura technical effort that has clearly been put into Commando, the end result simply isn't compelling enough."

=== Box office ===
Commando: A One Man Army earned around ₹35.0 million (US$370,000) on its opening day. The film raked ₹113 million (US$1.2 million) over its first weekend. At its first week, it netted around ₹173 million (US$1.8 million) having decent business in single screens. The film's collection grossed around ₹200 million (US$2.1 million) in India.

=== Alternate version ===
The film's German distributor called Nameless Media released four limited edition media books in August 2019 that contained a Full Action Version apart from the original uncut version. In this alternate cut, the songs and interval card have been removed.

== Sequels ==
After the film's success, the film received two sequels titled Commando 2 and Commando 3.
