= Amitabh Shukla =

Indian film editor, working in Bollywood

Amitabh Shukla is an Indian film editor who works in Hindi Cinema. He is most known for his work in films like Chak De! India, Krrish, Holiday and Chalte Chalte. He was awarded the Filmfare Award for Best Editing in the 2007 for his work in Chak De! India.

== Early life and career ==
Born in Lucknow, Shukla did a masters in Business Management from Xavier Institute of Management, Bhubaneswar majoring in finance and systems. He then went to the prestigious Film and Television Institute of India, Pune, from where he graduated in 1998. His first major film was Shah Rukh Khan's Chalte Chalte which was released in the year 2003.

Shukla is credited for editing several Bollywood movies like Bluffmaster!, Namastey London, and Singh Is Kinng . The film Chak De! India won him several accolades. He has worked as head of the technical editing department at Red Chillies Entertainment and is a visiting faculty at the Film and Television Institute of India.

== Filmography ==
Year	Film title	Notes
2018	Namaste England	
2017	Jagga Jasoos	
2017	Commando 2	
2016	Baar Baar Dekho	
2014	Holiday	
2014	Ekkees Toppon Ki Salaami	
2013	Raanjhanaa	
2013	Commando	
2012	Ajab Gazabb Love	
2010	Action Replayy	
2010	Pyaar Impossible!	
2008	Kismat Konnection	
2008	Singh Is Kinng	
2008	Thoda Pyaar Thoda Magic	
2008	Black & White	
2007	Namastey London	
2007	Chak De! India	
2007	Apna Asmaan	
2006	Kabul Express	
2006	Krrish	
2005	Bluffmaster!	
2005	Naina	
2003	Chalte Chalte	

== Awards ==
- Filmfare Award for Best Editing (2008) for Chak De! India
- Guild Award for Best Editing for Chak De! India
- IIFA Award for Best Editing for Chak De! India
- Zee Cine Award for Best Editing for Chak De! India
- The National Film Award for Best Promotional Film (2010) for Lost and Found
