= Vidyut Jammwal =

Indian actor and martial artist (born 1980)

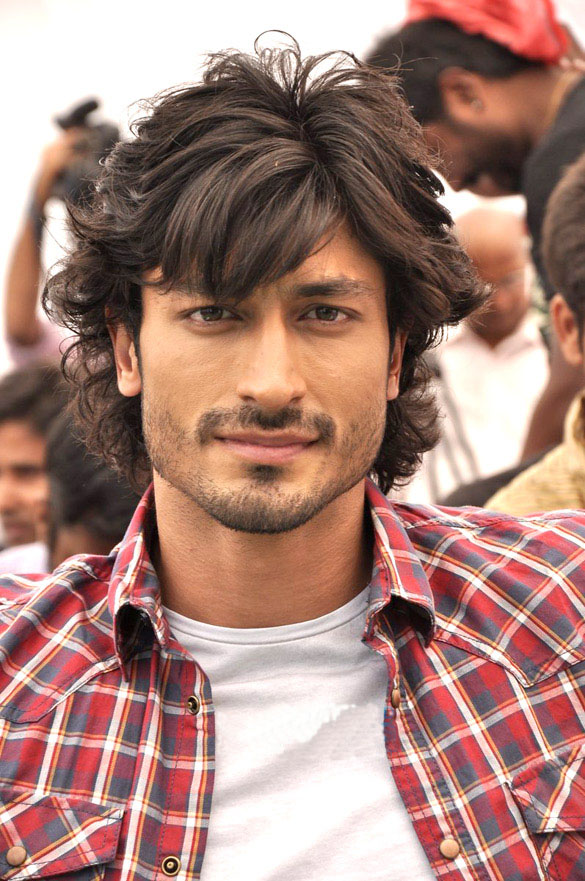
- Vidyut Jammwal in 2013
- Born: Vidyut Dev Singh Jammwal; 10 December 1980 (age 45); Jammu, Jammu & Kashmir, India
- Occupations: Actor; film producer
- Years active: 2011–present
- Organization: Action Hero Films

Vidyut Dev Singh Jammwal (born 10 December 1980) is an Indian actor and martial artist who predominantly works in Hindi, Tamil, Telugu and Hollywood films. He is a recipient of multiple accolades, including a Stardust Award, FICCI Frames Award, Filmfare Award, and IIFA Award.

He made his acting debut in the Telugu film Sakthi (2011), and his first Hindi film appearance was in Force (2011). He had his first lead role in the action film Commando (2013), in which he performed his own stunts. He went on to appear in several commercially successful Tamil films such as Billa II (2012), Thuppakki (2012), and Anjaan (2014). His later Hindi films include Baadshaho (2017), Commando 2 (2017), Commando 3 (2019), Yaara (2020), and Sanak (2021). He made his Hollywood debut by portraying Dhalsim in the martial arts film Street Fighter (2026). Jammwal is a practitioner of Kalaripayattu.

Jammwal ranked in The Times of India's list of India's Top 10 Most Desirable Men in 2012 and 2013. Men's Health named him among its Best Bodies list in 2011 and among the Top 5 Fittest Men in 2012. In 2012, People Magazine India included him in its list of The Sexiest Men Alive.

== Early life ==
Vidyut Dev Singh Jammwal was born on 10 December 1980 to a Dogra Rajput family, in Jammu, India. He is a descendant of Maharaja Hari Singh. He is one of three children born to an Indian Army officer and lived in various parts of India (owing to his father's transferable job) and trained in Kalaripayattu in an ashram in Palakkad, Kerala which was run by his mother, since he was three years old. He traveled to many countries training with martial artists in various forms, some of which find their base in Kalaripayattu. Jammwal travelled to over 25 countries, where he performed in live action shows. Growing up, Jammwal was inspired by Jackie Chan.

== Career ==
=== Early career and recognition (2011–2012) ===
Jammwal made his lead Bollywood debut with the John Abraham starrer action film Force (2011), a remake of the Tamil-language film Kaakha Kaakha. He played a negative role in the film and won the Filmfare Award for Best Male Debut. In the same year, Jammwal featured in negative roles in the Telugu-language films Shakti and Oosaravelli, both starring NTR.

In 2012, Jammwal made his debut in Tamil cinema with Billa II, as the antagonist opposite Ajith Kumar which earned him critical appreciation. He also played the antagonist in Thuppakki opposite actor Vijay, which became a blockbuster. For his performance in the film, he received a SIIMA Award for Best Actor in a Negative Role.

=== Martial arts films (2013–present) ===
Jammwal later acted in Hindi-language film Commando as a protagonist and performing real-world combat-based action without the aid of stuntmen. The film was showcased internationally for the first time in July 2013 at the Fantasia Film Fest in Montreal, followed by a screening at the Fantastic Fest in Texas in September 2013. He received positive feedback from international media and action directors, calling him India's answer to Bruce Lee and Tony Jaa. After the success of Commando, he played a sharpshooter cop in Tigmanshu Dhulia's Bullett Raja. In 2014, he played a supporting role in the Tamil-language film Anjaan, alongside Suriya. In 2017, he starred in Commando 2, the sequel to Commando, which became a box office success. Baadshaho was his next release that year in which he played Major Seher Singh, the movie did average business worldwide.

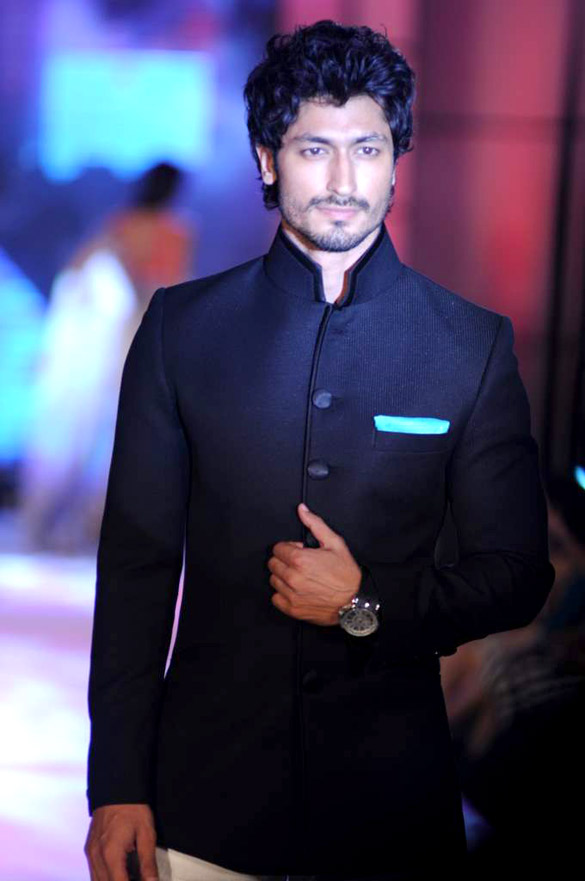
Jammwal ramp walking for a fashion show in 2012

In 2019, Jammwal starred in American director Chuck Russell's first Bollywood film Junglee and Commando 3. The latter saw him returning to the Commando series and became the most successful film in the franchise. His next project was Tigmanshu Dhulia's Yaara, an official remake of the French film Les Lyonnais. Yaara was one of three films Vidyut signed for – the other two being large format films by director Ram Madhvani, creating an aura similar to the Hollywood flick 300. In 2020, he appeared in an action thriller Khuda Haafiz, which was inspired from real life events. The movie became his biggest opener ever and its sequel Khuda Haafiz Chapter II was announced with same leads. Hosted the show India’s Ultimate Warrior on Discovery, a series featuring Vidyut Jammwal. He also played the lead role in the movie Sanak. In 2024, Jammwal starred in the sports action film Crakk which he also produced; it emerged a major failure. In 2026, Jammwal appeared in the Street Fighter movie as Dhalsim, which marked his Hollywood debut.

== In the media ==
Jammwal has been part of a number of popular magazine lists. He ranked in The Times of India's listing of India's Top 10 Most Desirable Men in 2012 and 2013. Men's Health declared him as List of Best Bodies and Top 5 Fittest Men in 2011 and 2012 respectively. In 2012, People Magazine India listed him in as one of The Sexiest Men Alive. In 2014, he was honoured as PETA's Hottest Vegetarian along with Kangana Ranaut.

== Personal life ==
Jammwal is a vegan and a rock climber.

On 1 September 2021, Vidyut Jamwal announced his engagement with Indian fashion designer Nandita Mahtani. In 2023, Jammwal and Mahtani broke their engagement.

== Filmography ==
=== Film ===
- All films are in Hindi unless otherwise noted.

Key
†	Denotes films that have not yet been released

Year	Title	Role	Notes	Ref
2011	Sakthi	Wasim Ali	Telugu film	
2011	Stanley Ka Dabba	Zoyaab		
2011	Force	Vishnu Reddy		
2011	Oosaravelli	Irfan Bhai	Telugu film	
2012	Billa II	Dimitri	Tamil films	
2012	Thuppakki	Sleeper cell's leader	Tamil films	
2013	Bullett Raja	ACP Arun Singh/Munna		
2013	Commando	Captain Karanvir Singh Dogra		
2014	Anjaan	Chandru	Tamil film	
2017	Baadshaho	Major Seher Singh		
2017	Commando 2	Captain Karanvir Singh Dogra		
2019	Junglee	Rajveer "Raj" Chandrashekhar		
2019	Commando 3	Captain Karanvir Singh Dogra		
2020	Yaara	Paramveer/Phagun		
2020	Khuda Haafiz	Sameer Chaudhary		
2021	The Power	Devidas Thakur		
2021	Sanak	Vivaan Ahuja		
2022	Khuda Haafiz: Chapter 2 – Agni Pariksha	Sameer Chaudhary		
2023	IB71	Dev Jammwal	Also producer	
2024	Crakk	Siddharth Dikshit	Also producer	
2025	Madharaasi	Virat	Tamil film	
2026	Street Fighter	Dhalsim	American film (Hollywood Debut)	

=== Television ===
Year	Title	Role	Language	Ref.
2013	CID	Commando	Hindi	
2017	Ultimate Beastmaster	Host/presenter	Hindi / English	
2022	India's Ultimate Warrior	Dojo Master	Hindi / English	

=== Music video ===
Year	Title	Singer(s)	Label	Ref.
2016	"Tumhe Dillagi"	Rahat Fateh Ali Khan	T-Series	
2016	"Gal Ban Gayi"	Neha Kakkar, Yo Yo Honey Singh, Meet Bros, Sukhbir	T-Series	

== Awards and nominations ==
Year	Award	Category	Work	Result	Ref.
2012	Stardust Awards	Breakthrough Performance (Male)	Force	Won	
2012	FICCI Frames Awards	Best Debut (Male)	Force	Won	
2012	Filmfare Awards	Best Debut (Male)	Force	Won	
2012	IIFA Awards	Star Debut of the Year – Male	Force	Won	
2013	SIIMA Awards	Best Actor in a Negative Role	Thuppakki	Won	
2013	Filmfare Awards South	Best Supporting Actor - Tamil	Thuppakki	Nominated	
2014	Zee Cine Awards	Umeed Ka Naya Chehra - Male	Commando	Won	

== See also ==
- List of Bollywood actors
