= DTamil =

Indian Tamil-language television channel

Discovery Tamil
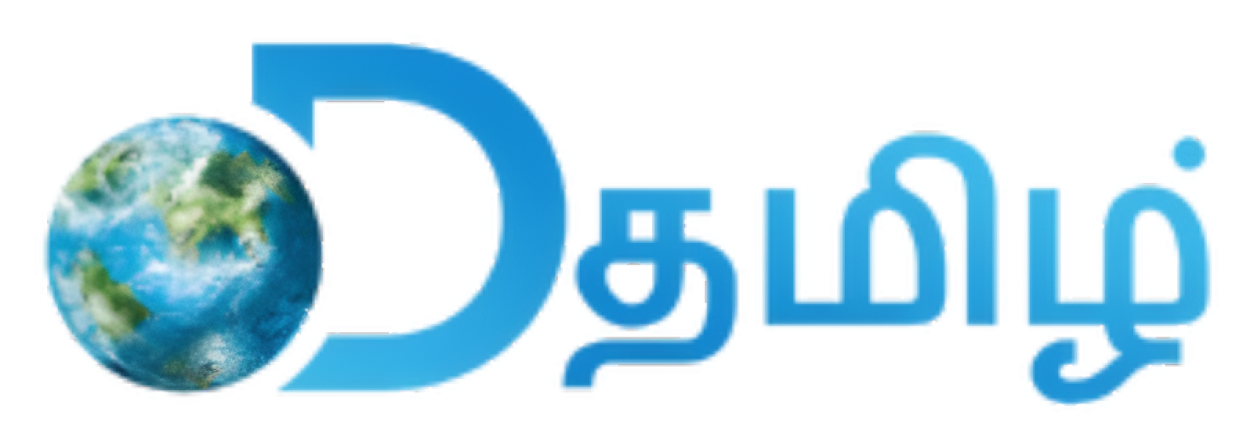
- Country: India
- Broadcast area: Indian subcontinent
- Headquarters: Mumbai, Maharashtra, India

Programming
- Language: Tamil
- Picture format: 576i SD

Ownership
- Owner: Warner Bros. Discovery India
- Sister channels: See List of channels owned by Warner Bros. Discovery in India

History
- Launched: 1 April 2003; 22 years ago
- Former names: Discovery 12 (2003-2011); Discovery Tamil

Availability - Available on all major Indian DTH & Cables.

Terrestrial
- DVB-T2 (India): Check local frequencies

Streaming media
- Discovery+ (India): Live TV
- Jio TV (India): Live TV
- Amazon Prime Video (India): Live TV

DTamil (stylized as Dதமிழ்) is an Indian pay television channel owned by Warner Bros. Discovery India. Launched on 1 April 2003. The channel is the separate Tamil dedicated channel of Discovery Channel formerly known as Discovery 12 and Discovery Tamil. Warner Bros. revamped The channel and starting September 16, 2024 the channel started telecasting hollywood movies and series in tamil. The channel can be viewed on digital cable and satellite television in India. The channel is also available on its OTT services Discovery Plus.

== History ==
The channel was launched on 1 April 2003 as Discovery 12

On 15 August 2011 the channel rebranded itself to Discovery Channel Tamil. The channel became first

On 1 October 2013 the channel rebranded itself with new logo and launched a programming line-up that includes 20 brand new programmes and six new seasons of popular shows.

On 17 April 2021 on the occasion of Tamil New Year the channel changed its logo to the latest one and introduced new shows.

From September 2025, the channel primarily focuses on broadcasting Tamil dubbed Hollywood movies, instead of its infotainment shows

== Programming ==
- Arrow
- Bert The Conqueror
- Chopped Junior
- Chutties Baking Championship
- Cutthroat Kitchen
- Decoding Disaster
- The Flash
- Food Factory
- Factory Made
- Food Paradise
- Ghost Brothers
- Galatta Kitchen
- How Do Animals Do That?
- Legends of Tomorrow
- Man vs. Wild
- Puriyaatha Puthirgal: Special Crimes Unit
- Supernatural
- Tanked
- Toddlers & Tiaras
- Vegas Chef Prizefight

=== Original Shows ===
This is the list of shows produced by Discovery India.

- Achcham Yenbadhu Madamaiyada
- Chadar, the Ice Trail
- Everest: Indian Army Women's Expedition
- Ganges
- Journey of India
- India's Best Jobs
- India's Citizen Squad
- India: Living Traditions/Medical Miracle India
- India's Ultimate Warrior
- Revealed: Rashtrapati Bhavan
- Revealed: The Golden Temple
- Revealed: The Line of Control
- Revealed: National Defense Academy
- Revealed: Rann of Kutch
- Suvai
- The Discovery of India
- Veer by Discover
- Wildest India

== See also ==
- Animal Planet
- Cartoon Network
- Discovery
- Pogo
