= Pioneer Productions =

British television production company

- Company type: Subsidiary
- Industry: Television
- Genre: Entertainment; Science; History; Drama
- Founded: 1988; 38 years ago
- Founders: Nigel Henbest; Heather Couper
- Headquarters: London, United Kingdom
- Area served: Worldwide
- Key people: Stuart Carter, Jeremy Dear, Kirstie McLure
- Parent: Tinopolis
- Website: pioneertv.com

Pioneer Productions is a British television production company based in London, United Kingdom, specialising in scientific and other documentary productions.

== History ==
Founded in 1988 by Nigel Henbest, Heather Couper, and Stuart Carter, Pioneer targeted science broadcasting in a period of global telemedia expansion and sought relationships with US factual television broadcasters.

In the 1990s, it produced series entitled Raging Planet and Extreme Machines. Later CGI films included Journey to the Edge of the Universe, The Unsinkable Titanic, Hindenburg: The Last Flight, Extraordinary Animals, In the Womb, and Catastrophe. In 2009, it helped produce the six-part series Christianity: A History for Channel 4.

In 2026, Pioneer secured exclusive access to Tupac Shakur murder suspect Keefe Dsecur and will produce a documentary about the trial.

== Awards ==
Pioneer has won the "Best Science Film" award twice at the Banff World Media Festival, the Grand Award at the New York Television Festival, a UK Indie award, Sony Award, CINE Golden Eagles, and other prizes in the U.S., France, Italy, and Greece. Recently, Pioneer Productions has won an Emmy Award and awards at the Royal Television Society.

== Content Produced by Pioneer Productions ==
Show		Format	Produced for
Mother Undercover (2023)		TV miniseries	Hulu
Gold: A Journey with Idris Elba (2023)		Movie	World Gold Council
The Windsor Castle Fire (2023)		Movie	Channel 4
Animals Like Us (Unknown)		TV miniseries	Love Nature Sky Nature
Rob Cell's Engineering Reborn (2022-2023)		TV miniseries	5Select
In the Womb: Animal Babies (2022)		TV miniseries	National Geographic Wild
Secrets of the Royal Gardens (2022)		TV miniseries	More4
V-Day (2020)		Movie	Smithsonian Channel
Ocean Autopsy (2020)		Movie	BBC Four
#Trump: How Social Media Changed the Presidency (2020)		Movie	Passion Distribution AMC/Sundance
What Happens to Your Body When You Climb? (2020)		Short film	Red Bull
Chasing the Equinox (2020)		Movie	National Geographic
Secrets of the Superfactories (2019-2023)		TV series	More4
One Hour that Changed the World: Moon Landing (2019)		Movie	Eden Passion Distribution
Superstructures: Engineering Marvels (2019)		TV miniseries	National Geographic
Animals After Dark (2019)		TV miniseries	Channel 5
Planes Gone Viral (2018)		TV miniseries	Passion
Charlie Head Standing up for the Amazon (2018)		TV episode	Red Bull
The Great American Eclipse (2017)		Movie	Science Channel
Secrets of Christ's Tomb (2017)		Movie	National Geographic
Cradle to Grave (2017)		Movie	National Geographic
Voyage of the Finnmen (2016)		Movie	Red Bull
Open Space Namibia (2016)		Movie	Red Bull
Treasures of the Earth (2016)		TV miniseries	PBS
David Baddiel on the Silk Road (2016)		TV miniseries	Discovery Channel
Your Face Says It All (2016)		TV miniseries	Channel 4
Bloody Queens: Elizabeth and Mary (2016)		Movie	BBC Two
Mail Order Murder (2014-2015)		TV miniseries	Investigation Discovery
The Next Mega Tsunami (2014)		Movie	National Geographic
How Sex Works (2013)		Movie	BBC Three
Strangest Weather on Earth (2013-2015)		TV series	The Weather Channel
Disasters at Sea: Why Ships Sink (2012)		Movie / TV Episode*	Channel 4 *NOVA
Storm City 3D (2012)		TV miniseries	Sky
How Drugs Work (2011)		TV miniseries	BBC Three
The Year The Earth Went Wild (2011)		Movie	Channel 4
Witness: Disaster (Unknown)		Movie	National Geographic
UFO UK: New Evidence (2011)		Movie	National Geographic
Curiosity	Egypt: What Lies Beneath with Brendan Fraser (2011)	TV episode	Discovery Channel
Curiosity	How Will The World End with Samuel L. Jackson (2011)	TV episode	Discovery Channel
Curiosity	What's Beneath America with Martin Sheen (2011)	TV episode	Discovery Channel
Curiosity	Why is Sex Fun with Maggie Gyllenhaal (2011)	TV episode	Discovery Channel
Japan Tsunami: How It Happened (2011)		Movie	Channel 4
The Year Britain Froze (2011)		Movie	Channel 4
Birth of Britain (2010)		TV miniseries	Channel 4
Mad and Bad: 60 Years of Science on TV (2010)		Movie	BBC Four
The Volcano that Stopped the World (Unknown)		Movie	Channel 4
How The Universe Works (2010-2023 )		TV series	Discovery Channel Science Channel
Oklahoma's Deadliest Tornadoes (2013)		TV episode	NOVA
Buried Alive: Chile Mine Rescue (2010)		Movie	Channel 4
The Bible: A History (2010)		TV miniseries	Channel 4
Christianity: A History (2009)		TV miniseries	Channel 4
The DaVinci Shroud (2009)		Movie	Channel 4
The Unsinkable Titanic (2008)		Movie	Channel 4 National Geographic Discovery Canada FremantleMedia
Journey to the Edge of the Universe (2008)		Movie	National Geographic
Catastrophe (2008)		TV miniseries	Channel 4 Discovery Channel
Hindenburg (2007)		Movie	Channel 4 Smithsonian Channel ZDF
Floods - The Year Britain Went Under (2007)		Movie	Channel 4
Inside the Living Body (2007)		Movie	National Geographic
Britain's Worst Weather (2007)		TV miniseries	Channel 4
How The Earth Was Made (2007*, 2009-2010**)		*Movie; **TV series	History Channel
Challenger: Countdown to Disaster (2006)		Movie	Channel 4
Extraordinary Animals in the Womb (2005-2010)		TV series	Channel 4 Granada International National Geographic
Krakatoa (2005)		TV series	Channel 4
Naked Science (2004-2011)		TV series	National Geographic
Raging Planet (1997, 2009)		TV series	Discovery Channel (US) Channel 4 (UK)
