= India's Ultimate Warrior =

Indian reality television show

- Genre: Reality TV
- Starring: Vidyut Jamwal
- Country of origin: India
- No. of seasons: 1
- No. of episodes: 6

Original release
- Network: Discovery Plus
- Release: 4 March – 14 March 2022

India's Ultimate Warrior is a reality television show produced by Base Films. Actor and Martial Artist Vidyut Jamwal is Dojo Master in the show. This show is based on a complete Warrior theme, as its setup is an ancient Martial Arts Dojo, where 16 elite fighters and athletes selected from across India will demonstrate their skills to prove that they are the ultimate warrior. All participants will go through a variety of challenges to prove their skills.

Along with Dojo Master Vidyut Jamwal there are 4 mentors from all across the world, who will be mentoring the selected contestants. The show was shot at the Empower Activity Camps in Kolad, near Pune, Maharashtra.

== Series overview ==
Season	No. of episodes	Broadcaster	Originally broadcast (India)		References
Season	No. of episodes	Channel	First aired	Last aired	References
1	6	Discovery Plus	4 March 2022	22 March 2022	
1	6	Discovery Channel	14 March 2022	22 March 2022	

== Plot ==
Vidyut Jammwal assembles 16 elite athletes and fighters from across India to compete for the title. In the first leg of their journey, they are tested on their Control, Fear, and Skill. 2 eliminated and 1 is crowned.

== Mentors ==
1. Bi Nguyen - Pro MMA fighter
2. Mykel Hawke - Special Forces Veteran
3. Shaun Kober - Combat Veteran
4. Shifu Kanishka Sharma- Shaolin Kungfu Grandmaster

== Contestants ==
1. Rohit Choudhary - Pro Boxer
2. Deepak Mali - Parkour Athlete
3. Haleema Momin - Stunt Rider
4. Pooja Yadav - Taekwondo Athlete
5. Muntazir Ahmad - MMA Athlete
6. Deepak Rao - Strongman
7. Deepak Sharma - Body Builder
8. Dinesh Shetty (Danshet) - (winner)
9. Lekha Jambaulikar - Powerlifting Athlete
10. Pearl Monteiro - Calisthenics Athlete
11. Sandeep Chauhan - Taekwondo Athlete
12. Abhishek Mishra - Professional Runner
13. Rounak Gulia - Professional Wrestler
14. Suchika Tariyal - Judo Athlete
15. Prakram Dandona - Pro MMA Fighter
16. Yogesh Kshatriya - Shaolin Kungfu Practitioner

== Teams ==
1. Team Shifu
  1. Deepak Rao
  2. Deepak Mali
  3. Sandeep Chauhan
  4. Rounak Gulia
2. Team Killer Bi
  1. Haleema Momin
  2. Muntazir Ahmad
  3. Prakram Dandona
  4. Pearl Montero
3. Team Shaun
  1. Rohit Choudhary
  2. Suchika Tariyal
  3. Pooja Yadav
  4. Abhishek Mishra
4. Team Hawke
  1. Lekha Jambaulikar
  2. Yogesh Kshatriya
  3. Deepak Sharma
  4. Dinesh Shetty (Winner)

== Episodes ==
No.	Title	Directed by	Original release date
1	"Control"	Unknown	14 March 2022
Sixteen athletes and fighters participate in an initial fight to test their skills. Later, the recruits are assigned to different mentors.
2	"Determination"	Unknown	15 March 2022
After a series of brutal fights and challenges, several of the fighters suffer serious injuries but they all refuse to quit.
3	"Focus"	Unknown	16 March 2022
Akshay Kumar test Vidyut Jammwal's athletes and fighters. Later, they complete with two new contestants while attempting a death-defying stunt.
4	"Survival"	Unknown	21 March 2022
Eleven fighters compete in a series of challenges that push them to the breaking point. Later, one of the students has a massive panic attack.
5	"Balance"	Unknown	22 March 2022
Eight fighters compete for a spot in the finale. Later, they participate in four challenges that test their balance and stability.
6	"The Final"	Unknown	23 March 2022
The six surviving fighters participate in five gruelling challenges that culminate in a no-holds-barred fight. Later, a fighter injuries himself.

== Guests ==
Episode(s)	Guest(s)	Note(s)	Reference(s)
Episode 3	Akshay Kumar
