= Mark Westcott =

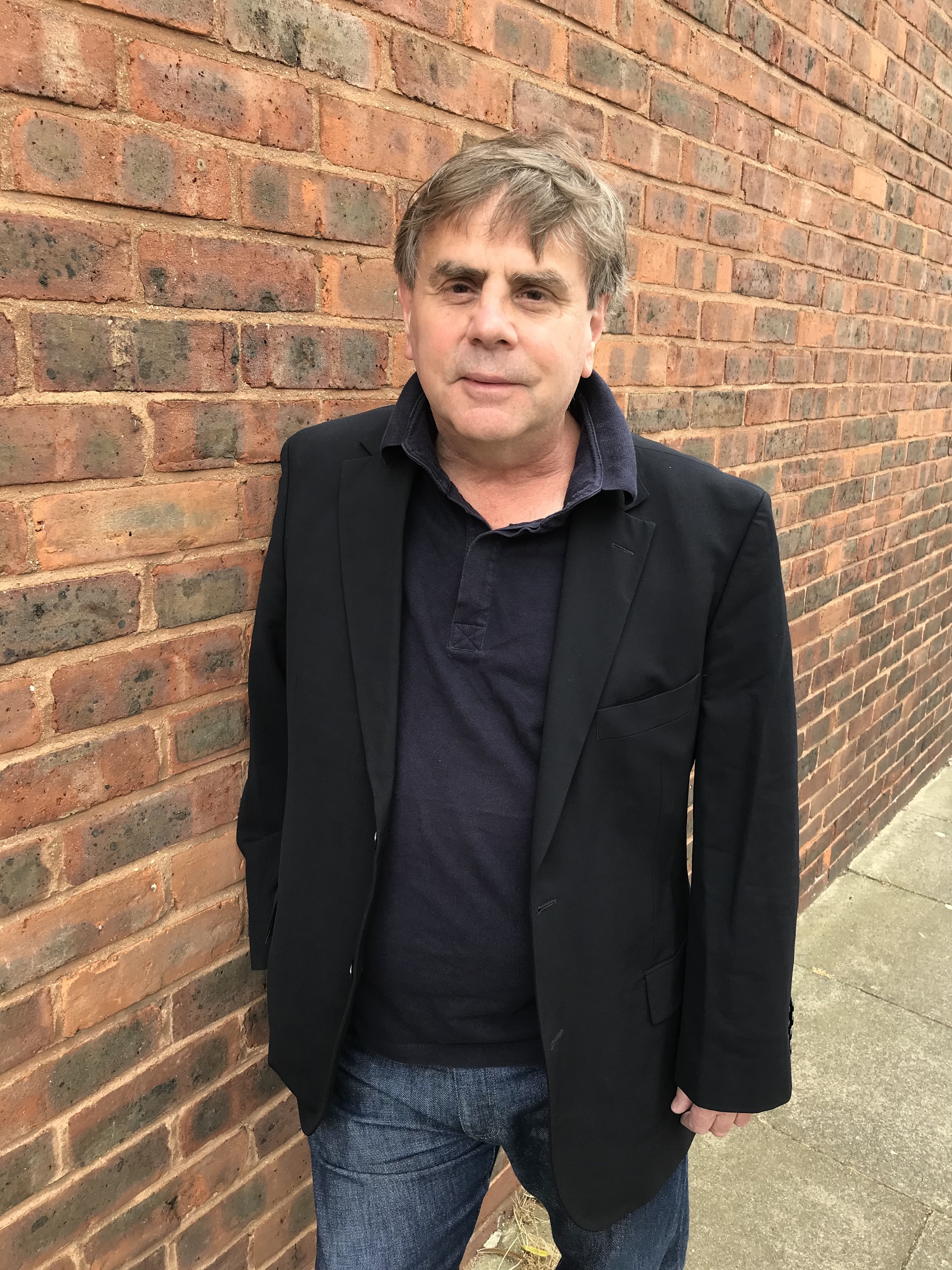

Mark Westcott is a British television producer and director based in London. Westcott’s television career began in 1992 when he devised and produced a series of programmes for British television that looked at the influence of American popular culture on the British way of life. American Affair was broadcast in the UK in 1992 and was fronted by the American radio DJ Randall Lee Rose.

In 1997 he joined the BBC series The Clothes Show as a director, also directing several episodes of BBC 1’s popular factual series DIY SOS in the 2000s. In 2004 he moved into adventure TV and worked with the British adventurer Bear Grylls on the C4 series Escape To The Legion on which he was credited as Producer. He went on to work as a director with Grylls again in 2006 on the first season of Discovery Channel’s Man Versus Wild (known in the UK as Born Survivor), in 2014 on ITV's Bear Grylls: Mission Survive and in 2015 in China on Survivor Games for Shanghai Media. Westcott also directed American survival expert Mykel Hawke in the 2006 Discovery Channel show, Science of Survival: Amazon and again, in 2011, as Supervising Field Producer on Season Two of Man, Woman, Wild. Mark Westcott is also credited as Director on two episodes of the 2008 Discovery Channel HD series, Raging Planet, Raging Planet Lightning and Raging Planet Avalanche which aired in the US, UK and internationally in late 2009.

Westcott was a partner in British chef Gary Rhodes' television production company White Tomato. In November 2019, the two were filming a new cookery series in Dubai for ITV 1 when Rhodes was taken ill and died of a bleed on the brain. During the global pandemic of 2020 Westcott co-founded and launched Marshal Bishop, to create and produce television content with partners around the world. In May 2021 the company announced its first commission, an adventure series for National Geographic and Disney+. Co-produced with ITV America, Called to the Wild tests human and dog pairings in a wilderness challenge each episode. The series premiered in December 2021.

Mark Westcott is a member of the Royal Over-Seas League and a Fellow of the Royal Geographical Society. He is a great-great grandson of the theologian Brooke Foss Westcott and a great nephew of both Foss Westcott, Metropolitan of India until 1945 and Frederick Westcott, Headmaster of Sherborne School from 1892.
