= Extreme Machines =

Television series

- Narrated by: William Hootkins
- Music by: Roger Bolton (Season 1); Justin Nicholls (Season 1-3); Guy Dagul (Season 4-5)
- Countries of origin: United States; United Kingdom
- No. of seasons: 5

Production
- Production company: Pioneer Productions

Original release
- Network: The Learning Channel Discovery Channel
- Release: April 26, 1997 – December 29, 2001

Extreme Machines was a documentary series created by Pioneer Productions for The Learning Channel and Discovery Channel. The series focused mainly on machines although in some episodes of Seasons 4 and 5, it also looked at disasters involving them. The series was largely narrated by William Hootkins. The show made also made use of scale miniatures in many episodes, managed by David Barlow.

== Episodes ==
Seasons	Episodes
1	11
2	12
3	12
4	12
5	10
Specials	7

=== Season 1 (1997) ===
No. in Season	Episode Title	Technology shown	Episode Directed by
1	Diving Deep	Submersibles	
2	Choppers	AH-64 Apache	Hugh Whiteworth
3	Hovercrafts [sic]	Hovercraft	
4	Image Impossible		
5	Fastest Man on Earth		
6	Race Cars	Honda HRH V8t (Tasman Motorsports - 1996 U.S. 500) McLaren F1 GTR (Gulf McLaren - 1996)	Hugh Whiteworth
7	Rockets	Space Shuttle Energia/Buran Long March 3B Ariane 5 V-2 Rocket R-16/SS-7 Saddler R-7 Semyorka/SS-6 Sapwood Vostok, Mercury Saturn V DC-XA	Rod Parker
8	Roller Coasters		
9	Spaceplanes	Space Shuttle DC-XA VentureStar Energia/Buran HOPE-X Hermes	Rod Parker
10	Speed Freaks		
11	Wheels of Steel	TGV Shinkansen Mallard Southern Pacific Daylight California Zephyr (Pre Amtrak) Union Pacific Big Boy Union Pacific Challenger Acela Express (Concept) Peru Andes Railline Nilgiri Mountain Railway Indian Pacific Channel Tunnel, Eurostar London Underground Transrapid Maglev	Yavar Abbas

=== Season 2 (1998) ===
No. in Season	Episode Title	Technology Shown	Episode Directed by
1	Tanks	M1 Abrams	
2	Motorcycle Mania		
3	Earth Breakers		
4	Car Crazy	Lotus Elise Jim Router's F-117 Car Amphicar Dutton Mariner Volkswagen Beetle General Motors EV1 Drag Racing Cars Moller Skycar	
5	Smart Weapons	BGM-109 Tomahawk Fat Man and Little Boy	
6	Flight Power	BAE Harrier II Hawker Siddeley Harrier AV-8B Harrier II	Hugh Whiteworth
7	Supersonic Landspeed		
8	Power Boats		
9	Mega Trucks	Komatsu 930E Shockwave Volvo ECT	
10	Four Wheel Force		
11	Supersight		
12	Carriers	USS John C. Stennis CVN-74 (Nimitz Class Carrier) F-14B Tomcat F/A-18C Hornet EA-6B Prowler E-2C Hawkeye S-3B Viking/ES-3A Shadow SH-60 Seahawk USS Forrestal CV-59 (Forrestal Class Carrier) USS Peleliu LHA-5 (Tawara Class Amphibious Carrier) AV-8B Harrier II HMS Invincible (R05) FRS.1/2 Sea Harrier	Hugh Whiteworth

=== Season 3 (1999) ===
No. in Season	Episode Title	Technology shown	Episode Directed by
1	Emergency Vehicles		
2	Submarines	USS Nebraska SSBN-739 (Ohio Class Submarine) Typhoon Class Submarine USS Miami SSN-755 (Improved Los Angless Class Submarine) Akula Class Submarine HMS Conqueror S48 (Churchill Class Submarine)	
3	Speed Freaks II	X-15 TGV Atlantique X-1 Apollo 10	
4	Ultimate Space Machines		
5	Ice Master		
6	The Ultimate Speed machines		
7	Balloons		
8	Super Cars		
9	The Landspeed Record		
10	Incredible Robots	MIT Leg Laboratory Honda E series robots Honda P series robots Surveyor landers Mars Pathfinder and Sojourner	
11	Metal Monsters	Chesapeake & Ohio 614	
12	Flight of the Future	YF-22/F-22 Raptor YF-23 Su-37 Terminator Sikorsky Cypher NASA Liftingbodys Ekranoplan KM (Caspian Sea Monster) Boeing 747-400	David Holryod

=== Season 4 (2000) ===
No. in Season	Episode Title	Technology shown	Episode Directed by
1	Pedal Power		
2	Rocketeers		
3	Car Crash		
4	Aviators		
5	Raiders of the Deep		
6	Super Trains/Super Trains Ultimate	P-40DC Genesis (Amtrak Sunset Limited) Superliner Railcar (Amtrak Sunset Limited) Acela Express Shinkansen TGV ICE Train (Eschede train disaster) Gaisal train disaster Moorgate crash Ladbroke Grove rail crash	Yavar Abbas
7	Adrenaline Junkies		
8	Extreme Rides		
9	Disasters at Sea		
10	Airships		
11	Mega Machines		
12	Jump Jets	AV-8B Harrier II XV-4 Hummingbird Balzac V GR.1 Harrier FRS.1 Sea Harrier BAE Harrier II X-35 JSF X-32 JSF XV-15/V-22 Osprey	

=== Season 5 (2001) ===
No. in Season	Episode Title	Technology shown	Episode Directed by
1	Bridges		
2	World's Greatest Ships: Power & Glory		
3	World's Greatest Ships: Dangerous Seas		
4	Incredible Motorcycle Jumpers		
5	Ultimate Underwater Machines I (Submarines)	K-141 Kursk (Oscar II Class Submarine)	
6	Ultimate Underwater Machines II		
7	Fear of Flying I (Crash Landing)	Boeing 747-100 (United Airlines Flight 811) Boeing 747-400 (Singapore Airlines Flight 006) Aérospatiale/BAE Concorde (Air France Flight 4590) Boeing 737-200 (Aloha Airlines Flight 243) Boeing 707, Vickers VC-10, Douglas DC-8 (Dawson's Field hijackings) Boeing 767-200ER (Ethiopian Airlines Flight 961) Boeing 737-300, Fairchild Metroliner (1991 Los Angeles runway collision)	Yavar Abbas
8	Fear of Flying II		
9	World's Tallest Buildings: Fear of Heights		
10	World's Tallest Buildings: Reach for the Sky	World Trade Center (note: this episode aired a month before (August 8, 2001) and mentioned severals subjects similar to the September 11 attacks) Empire State Building (1945 Empire State Building B-25 crash)	Mike Beckham Luke Campbell
