= Jailbreak (TV series) =

- Genre: Reality game show
- Directed by: Helen Grace; Jonathan Newman
- Presented by: Craig Charles; Charlie Stayt; Ruth England
- Country of origin: United Kingdom
- Original language: English
- No. of series: 1
- No. of episodes: 30

Production
- Executive producer: Sebastian Scott
- Production company: Princess Productions

Original release
- Network: Five
- Release: 12 September – 1 October 2000

Jailbreak is a reality television game show. It was hosted by Craig Charles, and co-presented by Charlie Stayt and Ruth England. It was shown in 2000 by Five in the United Kingdom. Original host Ulrika Jonsson had to pull out of the project due to health concerns over her newborn child.

== Format ==
Contestants in Jailbreak had to escape from a mock prison in order to win a cash prize of £100,000. The "prison", at a secret location near Potters Bar, Hertfordshire (Actual location was near Colsdale farm, just outside Cuffley), was fitted with hi-tech security systems. "Inmates" faced a three-week authentic prison regime, complete with 35 prison guards and a 18-foot (5.5 m) high fence topped with razor wire. A number of flaws in the security system were deliberately placed by the production team. Escapes were aided by a series of clues (often revealing flaws in the security system through cryptic messages), and by texts from the viewing public with suggestions on escape routes.

The show was won by three female contestants Roberta Woodhouse, 29, Hannah Davies, 24, and Laura Hawkins, 22. They broke out of the prison in the early hours of a Saturday morning - 14 days into the show.

It has not been commissioned for a further series.
