= Raging Planet =

American documentary television series

- Genre: Documentary
- Starring: Randall Lee Rose (Season 1); Robert Naughton (Season 2)
- Country of origin: United States
- Original language: English
- No. of seasons: 2
- No. of episodes: 18

Production
- Running time: 50 minutes
- Production company: Pioneer Productions

Original release
- Network: Discovery Channel; Science Channel
- Release: October 10, 1997 – October 4, 2009

Raging Planet is an American documentary television series that focuses on natural disasters. It originally aired in 1997 and 2009 on the Discovery Channel and had reruns on the Science Channel.

== Summary ==
The show focuses on natural disasters, including tornadoes, hurricanes, avalanches, lightning, fires, volcanoes, earthquakes, and blizzards. It features videos taken during disasters, computer-generated imagery effects, and reenactments. Rescue workers, scientists, and survivors are interviewed. Season 2 was produced in 2008–2009 in HD format from locations around the world. Transmitted in the United States, the United Kingdom, and internationally in 2009 on the Discovery Channel, the series was directed by Mark Westcott, Alex Williamson, Susannah Ward, and Martin Gorst and was produced by Pioneer TV.

== Episodes ==
=== Season 1 (1997) ===
The first season was produced in 1997, and it has 10 episodes.

| No. in Series | No. in Season | Title | Original U.S. air date |
|---|---|---|---|
| 1 | 1 | "Avalanche" | October 10, 1997 |
| 2 | 2 | "Blizzard" | October 17, 1997 |
| 3 | 3 | "Earthquake" | October 24, 1997 |
| 4 | 4 | "Fire" | October 31, 1997 |
| 5 | 5 | "Flood" | November 7, 1997 |
| 6 | 6 | "Hurricane" | November 14, 1997 |
| 7 | 7 | "Lightning" | November 21, 1997 |
| 8 | 8 | "Tidal Wave" | November 28, 1997 |
| 9 | 9 | "Tornado" | December 5, 1997 |
| 10 | 10 | "Volcano" | December 12, 1997 |

=== Season 2 (2009) ===
The second season was produced in 2009 in HD format, and it has eight episodes.

| No. in Series | No. in Season | Title | Original U.S. air date |
|---|---|---|---|
| 11 | 1 | "Tornado" | August 9, 2009 |
| 12 | 2 | "Lightning" | August 9, 2009 |
| 13 | 3 | "Flood" | August 16, 2009 |
| 14 | 4 | "Hurricane" | August 16, 2009 |
| 15 | 5 | "Blizzard" | September 27, 2009 |
| 16 | 6 | "Volcano" | September 27, 2009 |
| 17 | 7 | "Avalanche" | October 4, 2009 |
| 18 | 8 | "Sea Storm" | October 4, 2009 |
