= One Man Army (TV series) =

TV series

- Narrated by: Mykel Hawke
- Original language: English
- No. of seasons: 1

Original release
- Network: Discovery Channel
- Release: July 13 – September 26, 2011

One Man Army is a reality television game show produced by Renegade 83 for the Discovery Channel. The show pits four men (often law enforcement officers, special forces personnel, or athletes) against various challenges to test intelligence, decision-making, endurance, and physical strength. The host, Mykel Hawke, is a former Green Beret.

The show begins with four contestants, and the challenges test, in the following order, each of their speed, strength, and intelligence. The two fastest contestants in the first contest move on to the second contest. The two slowest compete in another elimination contest, with only the winner proceeding to the second contest along with the previous winners. In the second contest, the three contestants' strength is tested, and the weakest contestant is eliminated. In the third contest, the two contestants have a test of their ability to solve a puzzle or other intellectual challenge. The winner is given the title of "One Man Army", and $10,000.

A contestant can "tap out" of a contest if they are completely unable to finish it; essentially forfeiting the game. If a contestant taps out in the first contest, the third-best contestant automatically advances without having to complete an elimination contest.

== Example contests ==
=== Speed ===
- Maze - the four contestants are given 15 seconds to view a maze having one entrance and one exit. They then must crawl through the maze on their back as various distractions occur around them, including explosions, fireballs, water, brush, smoke, sandbags and thorns.
- Urban Combat - standing in the back of a moving pick up truck, the contestants must shoot 10 'people' targets using a fully automatic machine gun, then once they have hit every target, run to a wall where they have six shots with a grenade launcher to try and shoot into a building.
- "Dead Heat" - crawl hand-over-hand along a rope overhead of them to infiltrate the target area, traverse a debris-laden obstacle course, arrive at a firing range, hit a square target with a semi-auto handgun. Extended later in the first season to include 3 targets per contestant.
- Water Coffin - Escape from a water-filled box by sawing through the 4 bars of the grate.
- Lasers - Negotiate a laser field to obtain a briefcase, which is then handcuffed to the contestants wrist and must be brought back through the laser field to the start point.
- Ice Breaker - Extract 5 keys frozen into blocks of ice to unlock the door to the ice truck. Two ice blocks contain a hammer and screwdriver, respectively. The contestants can choose whether or not to attempt to free tools to assist in the extraction of the keys.

=== Strength ===
- Tug of War - The three contestants are chained to each other and one of them must be able to reach a bell switch 3 times. The remaining two have to try to reach one of the bells, the one that fails is eliminated.
- Breach - Get through two doors, a concrete-and-rebar reinforced brick wall, a drywall board wall, and two more doors, sometimes using brute force, in some cases with tools. One of the doors is a "trick" door, it is simply an ordinary door that is unlocked, if they check it they can simply turn the knob and walk through as opposed to using a sledgehammer to break the door down.
- Walls - Contestants must dig themselves under and carry heavy packs over and under a series of 5 walls.
- Ice Breaker - See Speed challenge. Used primarily for speed challenges, featured in season 1, episode 7 as a strength challenge.

=== Intelligence ===
- Cell - Two contestants are locked in cells with various items such as clothing, hangars, a bed, a chair, etc. The objective is to build an item which will allow them to reach nine feet out of their cell and snag the key to their cell. First one to unlock their cell and strike the bell wins the game.
- Waterboarding - The contestants are chained to a board that slides into a cold pool. They are shown a series of lights that they must set while underwater. They can ask to be pulled back up for air at any time. Once they set the series they push a button on the board; if they are wrong they have a 30-second penalty out of the water. After 6 selections, the seventh is the combination to unlock their chain; first one to solve all six puzzles, unlock their chains and strike the bell wins.
- Bomb Squad - This challenge tests the contestants ability to remember the steps required to defuse 4 different bombs. They are each given 90 seconds to study the steps, then fitted with protective gear and must defuse a pressure plate trigger on a bridge bomb, cut the wires in the correct sequence on an area IED, open and locate the right wire on a time bomb, and successfully access and disable a booby-trapped car bomb.
- Observe and Report - The contestants are delivered to a staged area where they are given 3 minutes to observe the people, situations and circumstances around them. When the timer runs out (signaled by a bomb detonation), the contestants deliver their 'package' (a pretext for the 'operative' being in the situation) then return. They are then presented with up to ten questions regarding what they have observed. The contestant with the most correct responses wins the challenge. In the event that a contestant has a sufficiently higher number of correct answers than the other such that the other contestant cannot win, then the challenge ends.
- Safe-cracking - The contestants are suspended upside down by their ankles and must open 4 safes containing parts of a handgun that they must then assemble and fire at a target to free themselves. The safes each have clues that will reveal the nature of the task necessary to open the lock.
