= How the Earth Was Made =

2009–2010 American documentary TV series

- Title screen
- Genre: Documentary
- Narrated by: Corey Johnson; Jonathan Keeble
- Composer: Tim Garland
- Country of origin: United States
- Original language: English
- No. of seasons: 2
- No. of episodes: 26 + 1 pilot (List of episodes)

Production
- Executive producers: Stuart Carter; Stephen Marsh; Susan Werbe
- Running time: 45 minutes
- Production company: Pioneer Productions

Original release
- Network: History Channel
- Release: February 10, 2009 – March 2, 2010

How the Earth Was Made is a documentary television series produced by Pioneer Productions for the History Channel. It began as a two-hour special exploring the geological history of Earth, airing on September 16, 2007. Focusing on different geologic features of the Earth, the series premiered on February 10, 2009, and the 13-episode first season concluded on May 5, 2009. The second season premiered on November 24, 2009, and concluded on March 2, 2012.

== Overview ==
How the Earth Was Made premiered as a 90-minute documentary special, narrated by Edward Herrmann, that aired on the History Channel on September 16, 2007, and focused on the geological history of Earth. The History Channel released the original documentary film to Region 1 DVD through Warner Home Video on April 15, 2008, and to Blu-ray through A&E Home Video on May 26, 2009.

The television series premiered on February 10, 2009. Each 45-minute episode focuses on different geologic features and processes of the Earth. The first season, spanning 13 episodes, concluded on May 5, 2009. The second season premiered on November 24, 2009. The first season of the television series was released as a four-volume Region 1 DVD box set on August 25, 2009. The second season was scheduled to be released on June 29, 2010. The Region 4, four-volume DVD set of season one was released by ABC DVD on August 1, 2010 and season two was released on November 1, 2010.

== Episodes ==
=== Pilot (2007) ===
Title	Original release date
"How the Earth Was Made"	September 16, 2007
This 90-minute documentary explains the geological and biological history of Earth, from its formation 4.5 billion years ago to the present day. Explained are the very beginnings of the Earth; the formation of the crust and atmosphere; the origins of water; when life began in the oceans and moved to the land; the Carboniferous period and how it ended; when dinosaurs ruled the land and the arrival of mammals; and the numerous ice ages. The documentary also explains plate tectonics and ends with the foreseeable next stages of our planet until its final stagnation about 2 billion years in the future.

=== Season 1 (2009) ===
No. overall	No. in season	Title	Original release date
1	1	"San Andreas Fault"	February 10, 2009
A look at how geologists are keeping an eye on California's 800 mile-long San Andreas Fault which many believe is overdue for a major earthquake in the region that could destroy some of the most valuable real-estate in the world.
2	2	"The Deepest Place on Earth"	February 17, 2009
A look at Challenger Deep, the deepest part of the Mariana Trench, where only a few scientists have been able to explore this amazing rift caused by the subduction of the Pacific Plate under the Mariana Plate.
3	3	"Krakatoa"	February 24, 2009
A look at the geologic history of the Krakatoa volcano in Indonesia, the 1883 eruption which spawned a tsunami that took tens of thousands of lives, and how another, possibly more powerful eruption, could happen again.
4	4	"Loch Ness"	March 3, 2009
A look at the geologic history of Scotland and how Loch Ness was carved out by the movement of ancient glaciers.
5	5	"New York"	March 10, 2009
A look at the geologic history of the land modern day New York City sits atop; how Ice Age glaciers carved the rock beneath the metropolis, and its connection to land on the east coast of Africa.
6	6	"Driest Place on Earth"	March 17, 2009
A look at the driest place on Earth, the Atacama Desert in South America which is 50 times drier than Death Valley; and how even in such a barren place, bacteria can still thrive.
7	7	"Great Lakes"	March 24, 2009
A look at the Great Lakes of North America – the largest expanse of freshwater on Earth, and how findings gathered from a fossilized coral reef and the salt mines below the lakes are providing geologists with evidence that the region was once an ancient seabed.
8	8	"Yellowstone"	March 31, 2009
A look at Yellowstone National Park and the caldera super volcano beneath it that is pushing up the land and long overdue for what could be a titanic eruption.
9	9	"Tsunami"	April 7, 2009
A look at how tsunamis are created, and the possible consequences if a landslide generated megatsunami were to strike the east coast of the United States and countries that face the Atlantic.
10	10	"Asteroids"	April 14, 2009
A look at how asteroids played a role in the formation of the Earth; a study of how the Barringer Meteor Crater in Arizona was formed, and why little evidence remains of the meteor itself that created it.
11	11	"Iceland Volcano"	April 21, 2009
A look at the geologic history of Iceland and how the forces of fire and ice – volcanoes and glaciers – played a role together in the island's formation.
12	12	"Hawaii"	April 28, 2009
A look at the geologic puzzle of how the isolated Hawaiian Islands chain was formed and predictions about their future.
13	13	"The Alps"	May 5, 2009
A look at the Alps mountain range in Europe; how geologic uplifting caused by the collision of the African and Eurasian plates brought such peaks as the Matterhorn and Eiger to their current height, and the marine fossil evidence found there that shows the land was once below sea level.

=== Season 2 (2009–10) ===
No. overall	No. in season	Title	Original release date
14	1	"The Grand Canyon"	November 24, 2009
A look at how the Grand Canyon in Arizona was believed to have been formed by the slow draining of an ancient lake which formed the Colorado River and carved the canyon out over millions of years.
15	2	"Vesuvius"	December 1, 2009
A look at the geologic history of Mount Vesuvius which destroyed the ancient city of Pompeii; how geologists are collecting evidence that the volcano is stirring again; and how another eruption could spell disaster for the unprepared heavily-populated city of Naples.
16	3	"Birth of the Earth"	December 8, 2009
A trip four billion years back in time to show the formation of planet Earth; to how molten material came together and solidified into rock; how the world survived a collision with a Mars-sized planet; how water arrived and formed the oceans, and when the first lifeforms appeared.
17	4	"Sahara"	December 15, 2009
A look at the Sahara, the largest desert on Earth, and how scientists have uncovered fossilized evidence of whales, fresh water shells and ancient human settlements – clues that this searing wasteland was once a fertile land with a great sea.
18	5	"Yosemite"	December 22, 2009
A look at how the geographically diverse Yosemite Valley was formed, and the debate whether it was carved by crushing ice age glaciers or a volcanic ripping of the Earth.
19	6	"The Rockies"	December 22, 2009
A look at the mighty Rocky Mountains; how they are being formed by geologic uplifting from the collision of the Pacific Plate and the North American Continent, and the evidence that these geologically young mountains are still growing.
20	7	"Ring of Fire"	January 12, 2010
A look at the Pacific Ring of Fire – the largest region of volcanic activity on Earth, that stretches around the Pacific Ocean from New Zealand, to Japan, to the Aleutians and down through the Andes mountain range of South America.
21	8	"Everest"	January 19, 2010
A look at the geologic history of Mount Everest, the tallest peak in the world, and how the Himalayas mountain range was really once an ancient seabed, pushed up to the roof of the world by tectonic smashing of the Indian plate into the Asian continent.
22	9	"Death Valley"	January 26, 2010
A look at the geologic treasure trove of Death Valley; how one of the hottest places on Earth holds evidence for the coldest times on our planet; and how the valley, already well below sea level, is still sinking lower into the Earth.
23	10	"Mt. St. Helens"	February 2, 2010
A look at the creation of the Mount St. Helens volcano in Washington state; its history of violent eruptions and the evidence another massive eruption could occur again in the near future.
24	11	"Earth's Deadliest Eruption"	February 9, 2010
A look back 250 million years ago when a massive volcanic eruption, (in what is now Siberia), spewed lava one mile thick over an area the size of Texas; caused intense climatic change that killed 95% of the life on the planet and paved the way for the next dominant species – the dinosaurs.
25	12	"America's Ice Age"	February 16, 2010
A look at past Ice Age eras that Earth has experienced throughout its existence; how the slightest changes in the planet's orbit and angle of rotation can bring them about; how long they can last, and when the Earth will endure another.
26	13	"America's Gold"	March 2, 2010
A look at how gold, a scarce element left behind by the explosions of supernovas, was collected by the forming Earth and how its geologic processes concentrated it in various places throughout the globe.

== Reception ==
The editor of the special, Huw Jenkins (although credited as Huw Jenkin), was awarded a 2008 News and Documentary Emmy Award for Outstanding Individual Achievement in a Craft: Editing, in a three-way tie.

In its first season, the television series averaged 1.4 million viewers.

== International broadcast ==
In Australia, the pilot along with both seasons were all broadcast on Pay television through History. For free-to-air viewers, season one also aired on ABC1 each Thursday at 11am from July 22, 2010.
