= Ruth England =

British television presenter and actress

- Born: 29 March 1970 (age 56); Inkberrow, Worcestershire, England
- Occupations: actress, television presenter
- Years active: 1992–present
- Spouse: Mykel Hawke (2005–present)

Ruth England (born 29 March 1970) is a British television presenter and actress. From 2010 to 2012, she starred in the Discovery Channel show Man, Woman, Wild with her husband Mykel Hawke, a former US Army Special Forces officer.

A graduate from the University of Westminster, Ruth has worked for the BBC, CNBC, ITV and Fox TV.

== Credits ==
- Jailbreak, Channel 5 (2000) – co-presenter
- Under Pressure, Channel 5 (2001) – co-presenter
- Wish You Were Here...?, ITV (2001–2003) – presenter
- Forever Eden, (2004) – presenter
- Walk This Way, ITV (2004) – presenter
- ChuckleVision, No Getting Away, BBC (2004) – Herself
- ChuckleVision, A Job Well Done, BBC (2005) – Reporter
- Wish You Were Here Today, ITV (2005) – presenter
- Bootsale Treasure Hunt, ITV – presenter
- Five News, Channel 5 – presenter
- The Big Breakfast, Channel 4 – newsreader
- World's Most Extreme Homes (2006) – host
- Sky High, ITV Central (2007)
- Angel (2007) – cast, as neighbour
- Squawk Box, CNBC (2008) – host
- BBC1 Primetime Inside Out (2009) – presenter on current affairs
- Man, Woman, Wild (2010–2012) – main cast
- Lost Survivors (2013) – main cast
