= Heather Couper =

British astronomer (1949–2020)

Heather Couper CBE FInstP FRAS
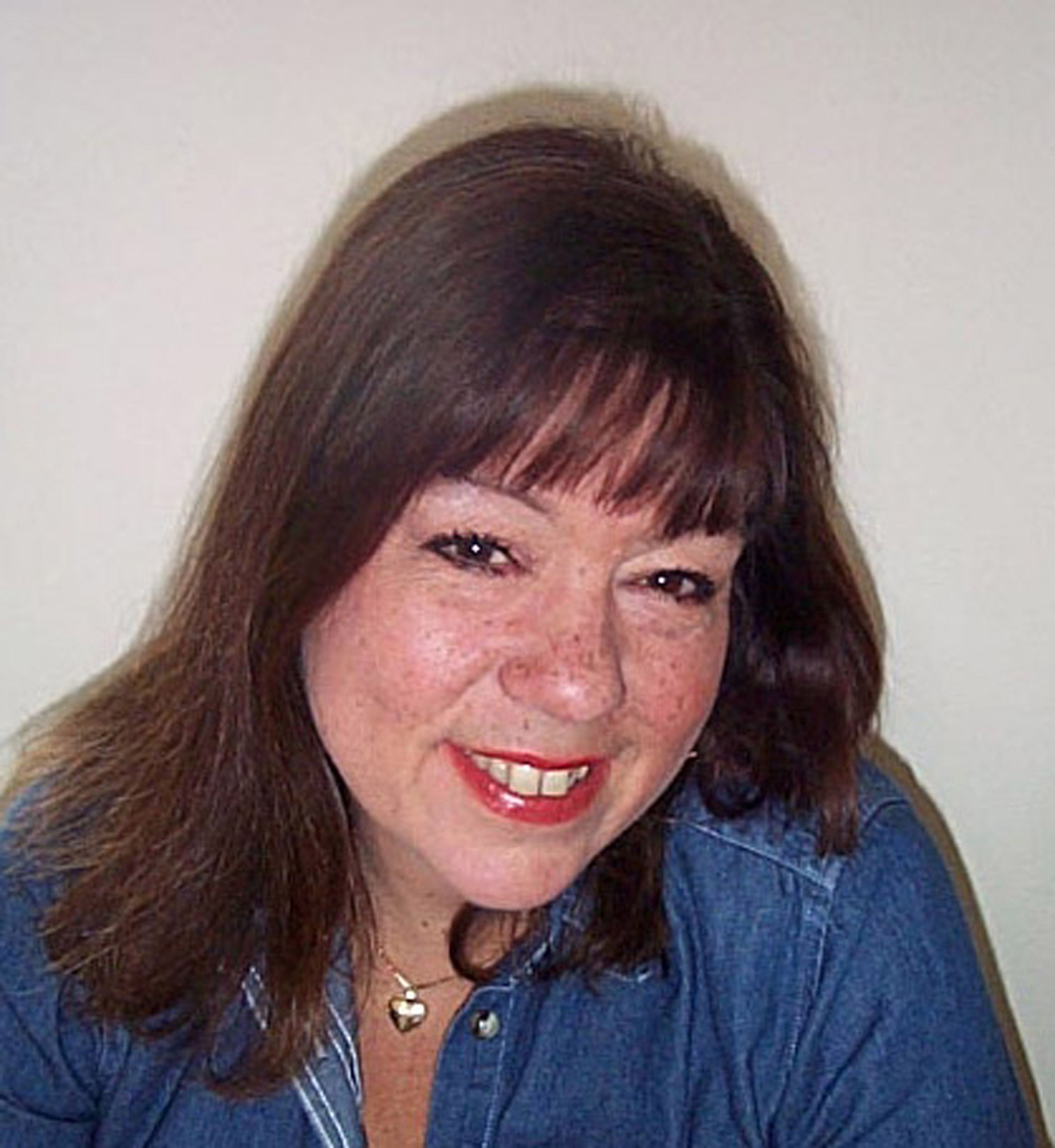
- Heather Anita Couper
- Born: Heather Anita Couper; 2 June 1949; Wallasey, England
- Died: 19 February 2020 (aged 70); Aylesbury, England
- Education: University of Leicester; Oxford University
- Awards: CBE FInstP FRAS; Sir Arthur Clarke Award
- Scientific career
- Fields: Astronomy
- Workplaces: Cambridge Observatory; Greenwich Planetarium; Pioneer Productions
- Website: http://www.hencoup.com/

Heather Anita Couper, CBE FInstP FRAS (2 June 1949 – 19 February 2020) was a British astronomer, broadcaster and science populariser.

After studying astrophysics at the University of Leicester and researching clusters of galaxies at Oxford University, Couper was appointed senior planetarium lecturer at the Royal Observatory, Greenwich. She subsequently hosted two series on Channel 4 television – The Planets and The Stars – as well as making many TV guest appearances. On radio, Couper presented the programme Britain’s Space Race as well as the 30-part series Cosmic Quest for BBC Radio 4. Couper served as president of the British Astronomical Association from 1984 to 1986 and was Astronomy Professor in perpetuity at Gresham College, London. She served on the Millennium Commission, for which she was appointed a CBE in 2007. Asteroid 3922 Heather is named in her honour.

== Early life ==
Born on 2 June 1949 in Wallasey, Cheshire, Couper was the only child of George Couper and Anita Couper (née Taylor). At the age of seven or eight, she was watching planes in the night sky because her father was an airline pilot when she unexpectedly witnessed a bright green meteor. Her parents said there was no such thing; but a newspaper headline the next day referred to a "green shooting star," and Couper then determined to become an astronomer.

She attended St Mary's Grammar School (merged with St. Nicholas Grammar School in 1977 to become Haydon School) on Wiltshire Lane in Northwood Hills, Middlesex. At the age of 16, she wrote to British television astronomer Patrick Moore asking if she would be able to take up a career in astronomy, and received the reply "being a girl is no problem at all"!

== Career ==
=== Astronomy ===
After two years as a management trainee, with the Peter Robinson fashion store and its Top Shop division (now Topshop), Couper joined Cambridge Observatory as a research assistant in 1969, becoming a Fellow of the Royal Astronomical Society in 1970. She graduated from the University of Leicester in 1973 with a BSc in Astronomy and Physics. At Leicester, she met fellow astronomy student Nigel Henbest; they formed a working partnership – Hencoup Enterprises – that focuses on astronomy popularisation. She then researched at the Department of Astrophysics at the University of Oxford, whilst a postgraduate student at Linacre College, Oxford.

From 1977 to 1983, Couper was Senior Lecturer at the Caird Planetarium of the Old Royal Observatory at Greenwich (superseded in 2007 by the Peter Harrison Planetarium), leaving to become a freelance writer and broadcaster. In 1984, she was elected President of the British Astronomical Association, the first woman and the second-youngest person to hold the position. Couper served as President of the Junior Astronomical Society (now the Society for Popular Astronomy) in 1987–9. The London Planetarium invited Couper to write and present its major new 1988 public show, Starburst!

Couper was appointed Professor of Astronomy at Gresham College in 1993 – the first female professor in the 400-year history of the college – and held the position until 1996.

=== Books and other publications ===
From 1978, Couper wrote over 40 popular-level books on astronomy and space, many in collaboration with Henbest. According to one reviewer, Couper and Henbest are 'great storytellers with an eye for a colourful character'.

Her articles appeared in leading astronomy and science magazines, including BBC Sky at Night, BBC Focus and New Scientist. She was a columnist for The Independent online newspaper.

=== Eclipses ===
In 1999, the Royal Astronomical Society and La Société Guernesiaise invited Couper to deliver keynote lectures on the forthcoming total solar eclipse, the first visible from the British Isles since 1927. Couper also led expeditions to view total eclipses of the Sun in Sumatra (1988), Hawaii (1991), Aruba (1998), Egypt (2006), China (2009) and Tahiti (2010).

=== Public appearances ===
Couper's international lecture tours and public speaking engagements ranged from the US to China; Colombia to New Zealand. She was the chief guest celebrity speaker on the maiden voyage of the P&O cruise ship Arcadia and gave presentations on Cunard's Queen Mary 2 and Queen Victoria. In 1986, Couper was aboard Concorde on its first flight from London to Auckland, New Zealand, as the astronomer responsible for showing passengers Halley's Comet while flying at 18,000 metres over the Indian Ocean.

Couper appeared at many festivals, including the Brighton Festival, the Cheltenham Science Festival and The Sunday Times Oxford Literary Festival. Her corporate work included keynote presentations to British Gas, AXA SunLife and IBM.

=== Radio ===
Couper presented many programmes and series on BBC Radio 4, including the live Starwatch series, Worlds Beyond and The Modern Magi. She won the 2008 Sir Arthur Clarke Award for Britain's Space Race on Radio 4's Archive Hour.

She also made numerous appearances on BBC Radio 2, Radio 4 and Radio 5Live, as well as regional and local radio stations across the UK. In 2008 Couper presented the 30 x 15-minute Radio 4 series Cosmic Quest, on the history of astronomy.

Her major series for BBC World Service Radio ranged from A Brief History of Infinity and The Essential Guide to the 21st Century, to the long-running Seeing Stars (presented with Nigel Henbest).

Outside astronomy, Couper was a guest presenter on the Radio 4 flagship programmes Woman’s Hour, the John Dunn Programme, and Start the Week. She showcased her interests in literature and local history in presenting episodes of Radio 4’s With Great Pleasure and Down Your Way, and in classical music by selecting her "pick of the Proms" for In Tune on BBC Radio 3.

=== Television appearances ===
Couper appeared as an astronomy expert on news and current affairs programmes, and presented many series and programmes, mainly on Channel 4.

Her first TV appearances were as a guest on The Sky at Night, a long-running series hosted by Patrick Moore. Couper (with Terence Murtagh) presented the 1981 children's series Heavens Above, produced by Yorkshire Television for the ITV network.

In 1985, Couper presented the seven-part series The Planets for Channel 4, followed in 1988 by the six-part The Stars. Her television presentational roles included The Neptune Encounter (ITV), A Close Encounter of the Second Kind (Horizon, BBC2) and Stephen Hawking: a Profile (BBC4).

She narrated many factual TV programmes, ranging from Ekranoplan: The Caspian Sea Monster (Channel 4) to Raging Planet (Discovery Channel).

=== Television production ===
Couper, along with Henbest and Stuart Carter (director of her series The Stars), founded Pioneer Productions, an independent UK TV production company creating factual programming, in 1988. Couper presented the company’s first documentary, The Neptune Encounter, in 1989, covering Voyager 2's flyby of Neptune. As producer, Couper's TV credits for Channel 4 include the award-winning Black Holes and Electric Skies, along with the series Universe: Beyond the Millennium. Couper left Pioneer Productions in 1999 to concentrate on more general radio and TV appearances.

=== Millennium Commission ===
In 1993, Couper was invited to join the newly created Millennium Commission, as one of nine commissioners responsible for distributing money from the National Lottery to projects that would celebrate and commemorate the new millennium. She was one of only two commissioners (along with Michael Heseltine) who stayed in post from the commission’s inception until it was wound up in 2009.

For her work on the Millennium Commission, as well as her promotion of science to the public, Couper was appointed a CBE in the Queen's Birthday Honours List in 2007.

== Death ==
Couper died at Stoke Mandeville Hospital on 19 February 2020 at the age of 70 after a short illness.

== Awards ==
- Times Educational Supplement Senior Information Book Award 1987
- Honorary Doctor of Letters, Loughborough University 1991
- Honorary Doctor of Science, University of Hertfordshire 1994
- Honorary Doctor of Science, Leicester University 1994
- Gold Medal, New York Festivals 1993, 1995, 1998
- Banff Rockie Award 1995
- Commander of the Order of the British Empire (CBE) 2007

== Bibliography ==
- Space Frontiers, 1978, Woodpecker, ISBN 0856853399
- Exploring Space, 1980, Hennerwood, ISBN 978-0907812753
- Heavens Above!, 1981, Franklin Watts, ISBN 978-0531042878
- The Restless Universe, 1982, George Philip, ISBN 978-0540010691
- Astronomy, 1983, Franklin Watts ISBN 978-0531046517
- Physics, 1983, Franklin Watts, ISBN 978-0531046524
- The Planets, 1985, Pan ISBN 0330290827
- The Universe: A Three-Dimensional Study (pop-up book), 1985, Random House, ISBN 0-394-54691-1
- Halley's Comet Pop-Up Book, 1985, Hamlyn, ISBN 978-0603004469
- The Stars (Space Scientist), 1985, Franklin Watts ISBN 978-0531100547 UK ISBN 978-0863132681 US
- The Planets (Space Scientist), 1985, Franklin Watts ISBN 978-0531100011 UK ISBN 978-0863132667 US
- Comets and Meteors (Space Scientist), 1985, Franklin Watts ISBN 978-0863132674 UK ISBN 978-0863132674 US
- The Sun (Space Scientist), 1986, Franklin Watts ISBN 0863132693 UK ISBN 0-531-10055-3 US
- The Moon (Space Scientist), 1986, Franklin Watts, ISBN 0863134726 UK; ISBN 0-531-10266-1 US
- Galaxies and Quasars (Space Scientist), 1986, Franklin Watts ISBN 0863134734 UK ISBN 0-531-10265-3 US
- Telescopes and Observatories (Space Scientist), 1987, Franklin Watts ISBN 0863135277 UK ISBN 0-531-10361-7 US
- Spaceprobes and Satellites (Space Scientist), 1987, Franklin Watts ISBN 0863135285 UK ISBN 0-531-10360-9 US
- The Stars, 1988, Pan, ISBN 033030352X
- The Space Atlas, 1992, ISBN 978-0863188299
- How the Universe Works, 1994, Dorling Kindersley, ISBN 0751300802
- Guide to the Galaxy, 1994, Cambridge University Press, ISBN 978-0521458825
- Black Holes, 1996, Dorling Kindersley, ISBN 0-7513-5371-X
- Big Bang, 1997, Dorling Kindersley, ISBN 978-0789414847
- Is Anybody Out There?, 1998, Dorling Kindersley, ISBN 978-0751356663
- To the Ends of the Universe, 1998, Dorling Kindersley, ISBN 978-0751358254
- Universe, 1999, Channel 4 Books, ISBN 0752217127 hardback; ISBN 0752272551 paperback
- Space Encyclopedia, 1999, Dorling Kindersley, ISBN 978-0789447081
- Extreme Universe, 2001, Channel 4 Books, ISBN 978-0752261638
- Mars: The Inside Story of the Red Planet, 2001, Headline, ISBN 978-0747235439
- Encyclopedia of Space, 2003, Dorling Kindersley, ISBN 978-1405301091
- Universe: stunning satellite images from outer space, 2006, Cassell Illustrated (UK) ISBN 978-1844034376; Thunder Bay (US) ISBN 978-1592236992
- The History of Astronomy, 2009, Cassell Illustrated (UK), ISBN 978-1844035700; Firefly (US), ISBN 978-1554075379
- The Story of Astronomy, 2011, Cassell, ISBN 978-1844037117
- The Astronomy Bible: The Definitive Guide to the Night Sky and the Universe, 2015, Firefly (US), ISBN 978-1770854826; Philip's (UK), ISBN 978-1844038084
- The Secret Life of Space, 2015, Aurum, ISBN 978-1781313930
- Space Visual Encyclopaedia, 2016, Dorling Kindersley, ISBN 978-0241228432
- 2019 Stargazing, 2018, Philip's, ISBN 978-1849074803
- The Universe Explained: A Cosmic Q&A, 2018, Firefly, ISBN 978-0228100829

== Radio presentation ==
- With Great Pleasure, 1987, BBC Radio 4
- Down Your Way, 1989, BBC Radio 4
- Seeing Stars (monthly series), 1990–2001, BBC World Service
- The Modern Magi, 1995, BBC Radio 4
- Starwatch (6-part series), 1996, BBC Radio 4
- Naming the Universe (5-part series), 1999, BBC Radio 4
- The Essential Guide to the 21st Century (5-part series), 2000, BBC World Service
- Red Planet (3-part series), 2003, BBC Radio 4
- Worlds Beyond (3-part series), 2004/5, BBC Radio 4
- Arthur C. Clarke: the Science and the Fiction, 2005, BBC Radio 4/BBC World Service
- A Brief History of Infinity (2-part series), 2006, BBC World Service
- Britain’s Space Race, 2006, BBC Radio 4, winner of the 2008 Sir Arthur Clarke Award
- Cosmic Quest (30-part series), 2008, BBC Radio 4

== Filmography ==
| Year | Title | Role | Broadcaster | Notes |
|---|---|---|---|---|
| 1985 | The Planets (7-part series) | Presenter | The Moving Picture Company for Channel 4 | Episodes: Children of the Sun, Mercury and Venus, Blue Planet, The Angry Red Planet, Planets of Gas, The Search for Planet X, Are We Alone? |
| 1988 | The Stars (6-part series) | Presenter | The Moving Picture Company for Channel 4 | Episodes: Reach for the Stars, Messages from the Stars, Secrets of the Sun, A Star is Born, Stardoom, Beyond the Big Bang |
| 1989 | The Neptune Encounter | Presenter | Pioneer Productions for network ITV | Fast turnaround documentary on the Voyager 2 flyby of Neptune |
| 1992 | ET: Please Phone Earth | Narrator/scriptwriter | Pioneer Productions for Channel 4/ABC | Gold Medal, New York Festivals |
| 1992 | A Close Encounter of the Second Kind | Presenter | BBC2 Horizon | Live outside broadcast as the Giotto spacecraft flew past Comet Grigg-Skjellerup |
| 1993 | Space Shuttle Discovery | Narrator | Pioneer Productions for Channel 4 | Inside story of a space shuttle mission, partly filmed by the astronauts on the space shuttle Discovery mission STS-51 |
| 1994 | Electric Skies | Producer/narrator | Pioneer Productions for Channel 4 | Documentary on lightning. Winner of 1995 Banff Rockie award for Best Popular Science Program; Gold Medal at the New York Festivals |
| 1995 | Arthur C. Clarke: Visionary | Presenter | Pioneer Productions for Discovery Channel Europe | |
| 1996 | Wonders of Weather (13-part series) | Producer | Pioneer Productions for TLC | |
| 1997 | Black Holes | Producer | Pioneer Productions for Discovery Channel | Gold Medal, Best Science Documentary, New York Festivals |
| 1997/8 | Raging Planet (10-part series) | Narrator | Pioneer Productions for Channel 4/Discovery Channel | |
| 1998 | Ekranoplan: The Caspian Sea Monster | Narrator | Ideal World for Channel 4 | |
| 1998 | Killer Earth | Narrator | Pioneer Productions for Channel 4 | |
| 1999 | Universe: Beyond the Millennium (4-part series) | Producer | Pioneer Productions for Channel 4/TLC/ABC | Episodes: Planets, Stars, Creation, Alien Life. Glaxo Wellcome/ABSW Science Writers' Award |
| 1999 | Stormforce | Narrator | Pioneer Productions for Channel 4 | |
| 2002 | Stephen Hawking: a Profile | Presenter | BBC4 | Documentary marking Stephen Hawking's 60th birthday |
| 2003 | Space Shuttle: Human Time Bomb? | Narrator/writer | Pioneer Productions for Channel 4 | Fast turnaround documentary on the Space Shuttle Columbia disaster |
