= Man, Woman, Wild =

American television series

- Genre: Reality show Survival skills
- Created by: Mykel Hawke Pierce
- Directed by: Mark Westcott; Doug McCallie
- Presented by: Mykel Hawke; Ruth England
- Starring: Mykel Hawke; Ruth England
- Narrated by: Mykel Hawke; Ruth England
- Composer: Devin Powers
- Country of origin: United States
- Original language: English
- No. of seasons: 2
- No. of episodes: Twenty two

Production
- Executive producers: David Garfinkle, Jay Renfroe, Doug McCallie, Bill Howard
- Producer: Todd Cohen
- Production location: Various
- Editor: Dan Tivin
- Running time: 60 minutes
- Production company: Renegade 83

Original release
- Network: Discovery Channel
- Release: July 16, 2010 – January 19, 2012

Related
- Dual Survival; Man vs. Wild

Man, Woman, Wild was a cable television reality series which originally aired on the Discovery Channel from July 2010 to January 2012. The show features former US Army Special Forces survival expert Mykel Hawke, and his television journalist wife, Ruth England, who have to survive for a half-week with limited supplies in wild and inhospitable locations around the world.

The show focuses on Hawke teaching his wife various survival skills such as starting fire without the aid of modern implements like matches and lighters, locating and treating sources of water, and eating non-traditional forms of food such as insects and wild plants. An emergency crew remained on permanent stand-by during filming and was actually utilized during the first season, for example, when England was overcome by severe heat exhaustion and dehydration in a Mexican desert.

Originally running for two seasons, Man, Woman, Wild's first episode aired on July 16, 2010, and its last episode aired on January 19, 2012. The survival series was not renewed for a third season, which was confirmed by Mykel Hawke via Facebook in January 2012. About the closure, Hawke stated: "The show in its current format was too hard on us and our family, so, we chose to stop".

In 2014, the couple resurrected the format in the Travel Channel series Lost Survivors.

== Episodes ==
=== Season 1 (2010) ===
1. 2010-07-16, Amazon
2. 2010-07-23, Botswana
3. 2010-07-30, Louisiana
4. 2010-08-13, Tasmania
5. 2010-08-20, Mexico
6. 2010-08-27, Utah
7. 2010-09-03, Motukitiu, Aitutaki, Cook Islands
8. 2010-09-10, Alaska (Denali National Park)
9. 2010-09-17, Tennessee (The Smoky Mountains)
10. 2010-09-24, Dominica

=== Season 2 (2011–2012) ===
1. 2011-09-02, Lost at Sea (near Bahamas)
2. 2011-09-09, Louisiana Firestorm
3. 2011-09-16, Amazon Jungle Maze
4. 2011-09-23, Quicksand & Sinkholes (South Andros in the Bahamas)
5. 2011-09-23, Volcanic Destruction (Montserrat)
6. 2011-09-30, Message in a Bottle (Pearl Islands, Panama)
7. 2011-10-07, High Desert Thirst (Anza-Borrego Desert State Park in California)
8. 2011-10-14, Bear Encounter (Blackfeet Nation in Montana)
9. 2011-12-29, Bear's Kitchen (Alaska)
10. 2012-01-05, Newts and Roots (Kentucky)
11. 2012-01-12, Croatian Cave Odyssey (Velebit caves and mountains, Croatia)
12. 2012-01-19, Scottish Highlands Peril

== See also ==
- Dual Survival
- Man vs. Wild
- Masters of Survival
- Naked and Afraid
- Survivorman
