= Christianity: A History =

British television series

Christianity: A History is an eight-part television series produced in 2009 by Pioneer Productions for Channel 4. Each episode is presented by a different personality with a connection to the story they tell. The episodes cover a range of personal views on issues from the religion's inception in Palestine and its progression in the Roman empire, the Crusades, English Reformation, colonial dissemination and the Age of Enlightenment, to the impacts of science and 21st-century views.

== Show Listing ==
1. Jesus The Jew: Writer Howard Jacobson discusses the nature of Jesus' 'Jewish-ness' and looks at the chequered relationship between Judaism and Christianity.
2. Rome: Michael Portillo investigates the political compromises that Christianity was forced to make when the Roman Empire adopted it as its official religion.
3. Dark Ages: Theologian Robert Beckford looks at the impact Christianity has had on Britain and argues that the sixth-century conversion was the most important event in British history.
4. Crusades: War reporter Rageh Omaar examines the relationship between Christianity and war, and the lasting impact of the Crusades on Christianity's relations with Islam.
5. Reformation: Ann Widdecombe, who has converted from Anglicanism to Catholicism, focuses on the Reformation and the intolerance, divisions, and bloodshed it caused.
6. Dark Continents: Writer and actor Kwame Kwei-Armah, whose African ancestors were enslaved and converted as part of the European colonial conquest of Africa, investigates the global spread of Christianity.
7. God and the Scientists: Leading British scientist Colin Blakemore examines the impact of the scientific revolution and the Enlightenment of the 17th and 18th centuries and how scientific discovery challenged centuries of biblical teachings.
8. The Future of Christianity: And in the final episode, QC Cherie Blair looks at the challenges Christianity faced in the 20th century from war, genocide and revolutionary social change; and asks whether as a world religion it has a real future.
