= Big Bayou Canot rail accident =

1993 train wreck in Alabama, U.S.

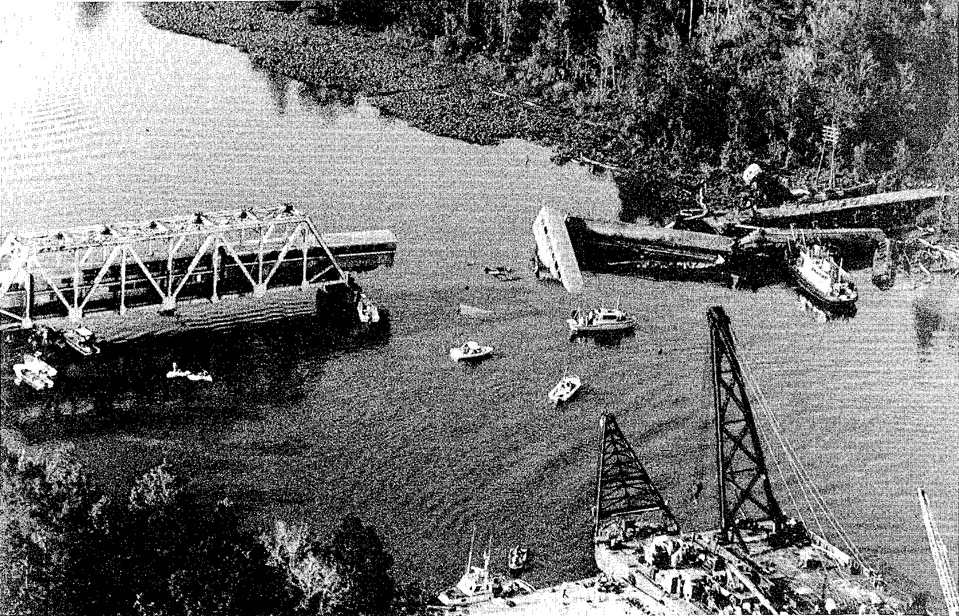
- The wreck of the Sunset Limited at Big Bayou Canot

- Location within Alabama Location within the United States

Details
- Date: September 22, 1993; 2:53 am
- Location: Mobile County, Alabama, U.S.
- Coordinates: 30.8173°N 87.9932°W
- Country: United States
- Line: M&M Subdivision
- Operator: Amtrak
- Service: Sunset Limited
- Incident type: Derailment
- Cause: Barge collision with bridge / wrong design

Statistics
- Trains: 1
- Passengers: 220
- Deaths: 47
- Injured: 103

The Big Bayou Canot rail accident was the derailment of the Amtrak Sunset Limited passenger train on the CSX Transportation Big Bayou Canot Bridge in Mobile County, Alabama near Mobile, Alabama, on September 22, 1993. It was caused by displacement of a span and deformation of the rails when a tow of heavy barges collided with the rail bridge eight minutes earlier. Forty-seven people were killed and 103 more were injured. To date, it is the deadliest train wreck in both Amtrak's history and Alabama's railway history. It is also the deadliest rail disaster in the United States since the 1958 Newark Bay rail accident, in which 48 people died.

== Events ==
Prior to the derailment, a barge pushed by the towboat Mauvilla (owned and operated by Warrior and Gulf Navigation of Chickasaw, Alabama) made a wrong turn on the Mobile River and entered the Big Bayou Canot, a channel of water closed to commercial boat traffic and crossed by a CSX Transportation rail bridge.

Mauvilla's pilot, Willie Odom, was not properly trained on how to read his radar. Due to poor visibility in heavy fog and lack of experience, Odom did not realize he was off course. The boat also lacked a compass and a chart of the waters. Odom believed that he was still on the Mobile River and had identified the bridge in the radar as another tug boat. After the investigation, he was found to be not criminally liable for the incident.

Mauvilla struck the bridge at around 2:45 a.m. The span had been designed to rotate so it could be converted to a swing bridge by adding appropriate equipment. No such conversion had been performed and the span had not been adequately secured against unintended movement. The collision forced the unsecured end of the bridge span approximately 3 feet (1 m) out of alignment and severely kinked the track.

Despite the displacement of the bridge, the continuously welded rails did not break. As a result, the track circuit controlling the bridge approach block signals remained closed (intact) and the nearest signal continued to display a clear (green) aspect. Had one of the rails been severed by the bridge's displacement, the track circuit would have opened, causing the approach signal to display a stop (red) aspect and the preceding signal a yellow (caution) approach indication. This might have given the Amtrak engineers sufficient time to stop the train or at least reduce its speed in an effort to mitigate the accident's severity.

At 2:53 a.m., Amtrak's Sunset Limited train, powered by three locomotives (one GE Genesis P40DC number 819 in the front and two F40PHRs, numbers 262 and 312) en route from Los Angeles, California, to Miami, Florida, with 220 passengers and crew aboard, crossed the bridge at around 70 miles per hour (110 km/h) and derailed at the kink. The first of its three locomotives slammed into the displaced span, causing that part of the bridge to collapse into the water beneath. The lead locomotive embedded itself nose-first into the canal bank and the other two locomotives, together with the baggage car, sleeping car and two of the six passenger cars, plunged into the water. The locomotives' fuel tanks, each of which held several thousand gallons of diesel fuel, ruptured upon impact, resulting in a massive fuel spill and a fire. Forty-seven people, including the train's three engineers, two crew members, and 42 passengers were killed – many by drowning, others by fire/smoke inhalation. Another 103 were injured. The towboat's four crew members were not injured. Odom helped save 17 people after the crash using the same towboat that had been pushing the barge that hit the bridge.

The Discovery Channel program Extreme Machines revealed in a 2000 episode that a broken toilet had delayed the train by over 30 minutes at Mobile station. An episode of the National Geographic documentary program Seconds From Disaster that aired in 2004 also examined the derailment. In addition to corroborating findings of the official accident report, the program revealed that the train had also been delayed in New Orleans by repairs to an air conditioner unit and a toilet. This had put it a half-hour behind schedule. If not for this delay, the Sunset Limited would have passed over the Big Bayou Canot bridge 20 minutes before the bridge was hit by the barge.

== Aftermath ==
As a result of its investigation, on September 19, 1994, the National Transportation Safety Board (NTSB) made a comprehensive series of recommendations to the U.S. Department of Transportation, the U.S. Army Corps of Engineers, the U.S. Coast Guard, the Federal Emergency Management Agency, Amtrak, the American Waterways Operators, Inc., the Warrior & Gulf Navigation Company, the Association of American Railroads, and the American Short Line Railroad Association. Following a recommendation to maintain a record of onboard passenger numbers, Amtrak now records passenger lists electronically. Another recommendation was to "increase protection for bridges identified as vulnerable".

== Notable passengers ==
- Andrea Chancey — 11-year-old wheelchair-using "miracle child" with cerebral palsy, whose parents died in the crash
- Ken Ivory and Michael Dopheide — honored by the Coast Guard for saving lives after the crash
- R. C. Sproul — related his experience in the crash

== See also ==
- List of bridge failures
