= Forever Eden =

2004 reality television series

- Genre: Reality television
- Presented by: Ruth England
- Country of origin: United States
- Original language: English
- No. of seasons: 1
- No. of episodes: 7

Production
- Executive producers: Arthur Smith; Kent Weed; Tom Gutteridge; Charles Thompson; Bruce Toms
- Running time: 45-46 minutes
- Production companies: Mentorn; A. Smith & Co.

Original release
- Network: Fox
- Release: March 1 – April 9, 2004

Forever Eden is an American reality television series broadcast by the Fox Broadcasting Company (Fox). The series premiered on March 1, 2004, and it concluded on April 9, 2004. The contestants in the series could live in a resort not for weeks or months, but for years. It was hosted by Ruth England. In the end, contestants Shawna and Wallace won a combined total of $260,000. Brooke and Adam were runners-up.

The show was pulled after seven episodes, leaving eighteen episodes unaired. The remaining episodes were eventually screened in the United States on Fox Reality.

== Format ==
Set in Jamaica, the series followed a group of unmarried men and women who lived together at a luxury resort. The contestants, who voluntarily agreed to cease contact with their friends and family, had the opportunity to live at and enjoy the amenities of the resort indefinitely. Contestants accrued a monetary reward pursuant to however long they resided at the resort. This reward, however, was contingent on the contestants remaining at the resort for predetermined periods of time. Contestants had the ability to leave the series at anytime, however, they would no longer receive the reward if they opted to leave. As the series progressed, producers introduced new contestants and guest stars, which included former partners and long-lost relatives of the contestants. The series was hosted by English television presenter Ruth England.

== Production ==
The concept for the series stemmed from the reality television series Paradise Hotel.

The series was filmed in Jamaica at a cost of $750,000 per episode.

== Episodes ==
| No. | Title | Original release date | US viewers (millions) |
|---|---|---|---|
| 1 | "Reap What You Sow, Part 1" | March 1, 2004 | 9.7 |
| 2 | "Reap What You Sow, Part 2" | March 2, 2004 | 9.9 |
| 3 | "True Colors" | March 8, 2004 | 5.74 |
| 4 | "Adam's Apple" | March 15, 2004 | 4.3 |
| 5 | "Stand By Your Man" | March 25, 2004 | 3.8 |
| 6 | "It Is on and It Is On" | April 2, 2004 | 3.0 |
| 7 | "Where's Wallace?" | April 9, 2004 | 2.5 |
| 8 | "Worst Nightmare" | Unaired | N/A |
| 9 | "It's Just a Kiss" | Unaired | N/A |
| 10 | "I Know What You Did Last Night" | Unaired | N/A |
| 11 | "Law & Eden" | Unaired | N/A |
| 12 | "Mum's the Word" | Unaired | N/A |
| 13 | "With or Without You" | Unaired | N/A |
| 14 | "Mama Knows Best" | Unaired | N/A |
| 15 | "Trash Talkin'" | Unaired | N/A |
| 16 | "Here Comes the Bribe" | Unaired | N/A |
| 17 | "London Calling" | Unaired | N/A |
| 18 | "Double Crossing Jordan" | Unaired | N/A |
| 19 | "Crying All the Way to the Bank" | Unaired | N/A |
| 20 | "Money Changes Everything" | Unaired | N/A |
| 21 | "Risky Business" | Unaired | N/A |
| 22 | "Kassie Who?" | Unaired | N/A |
| 23 | "Banishing Act" | Unaired | N/A |
| 24 | "Old Friends" | Unaired | N/A |
| 25 | "Forever Eden" | Unaired | N/A |
