= Journey to the Edge of the Universe =

- Genre: Documentary
- Written by: Nigel Henbest, Billie Pink
- Directed by: Yavar Abbas
- Starring: Alec Baldwin; Sean Pertwee; Paul Essiembre
- Narrated by: Alec Baldwin (US); Sean Pertwee (UK); Paul Essiembre (Canada)
- Music by: Anne Nikitin; Ty Unwin
- Country of origin: United States
- Original language: English

Production
- Producers: Yavar Abbas; John Vandervelde
- Editors: Zeliha Bozkurt; Benjamin Casper; Benedict Jackson
- Running time: 91 minutes
- Production companies: Handel Productions; National Geographic Channel; Pioneer Productions

Original release
- Release: December 7, 2008

Journey to the Edge of the Universe is a documentary film broadcast on National Geographic and the Discovery Channel. It depicts a simulated space journey from Earth to the edge of the universe. The US edition was narrated by Alec Baldwin and the UK edition by Sean Pertwee.

The documentary runs 91 minutes and was broadcast on December 7, 2008.

== Synopsis ==
The documentary gives the impression of using a single, continuous take to visualize a journey from the Earth to the edge of the Universe, which is explained to be the Big Bang. CGI animation was used to create the film.

== Media ==
Both Blu-ray and DVD releases of the documentary were released on 31 March 2009.

== See also ==
- Shape of the universe
