= Nigel Henbest =

British astronomer (born 1951)

Nigel Henbest FRAS
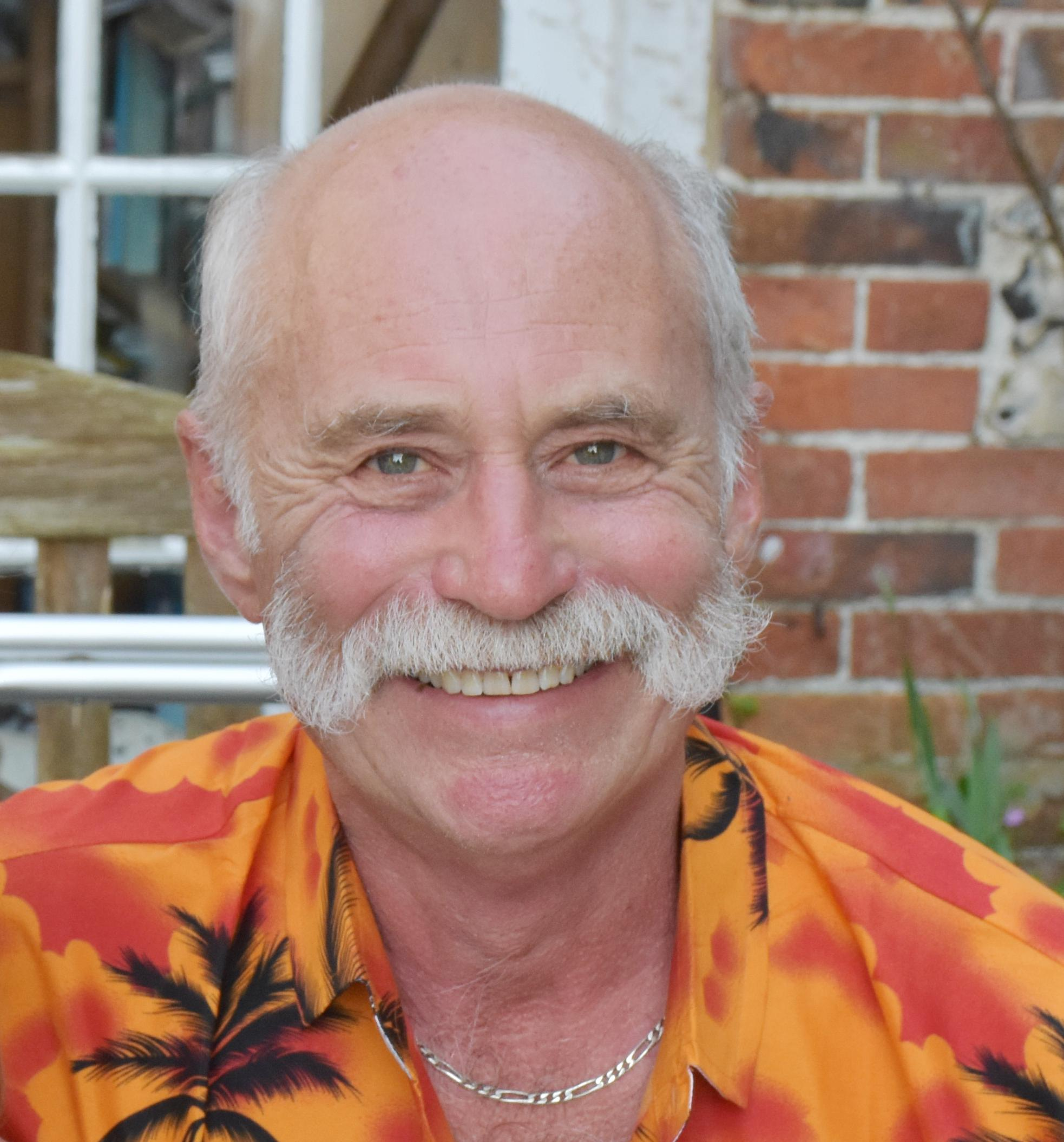
- Born: 6 May 1951 (age 75); Manchester, England
- Education: University of Cambridge; Leicester University
- Known for: Promotion and popularisation of Science and Astronomy
- Scientific career
- Fields: Astronomy
- Workplaces: Pioneer Productions; British Astronomical Association
- Thesis: High Resolution Radio Observations of Tycho's Supernova Remnant and Forty-Eight Extragalactic Sources (1976)
- Doctoral advisor: Sir Martin Ryle

Stuart Nigel Henbest FRAS (born 6 May 1951) is a British astronomer and science communicator. Born in Manchester and educated in Belfast and at Leicester University, Henbest researched in radio astronomy at the University of Cambridge before becoming a freelance author, television producer and astronomy lecturer. Asteroid 3795 Nigel is named after him.

Henbest has written around 50 books and over 1,000 articles on astronomy and space for the popular market, including The New Astronomy and The Guide to the Galaxy. Among his award-winning television productions are On Jupiter, Black Holes and Journey to the Edge of the Universe. As well as lecturing on cruises, Henbest has given astronomy presentations on all seven continents (including Antarctica). He also leads tours to view total eclipses of the Sun.

Formerly Astronomy Consultant to New Scientist magazine, editor of the Journal of the British Astronomical Association and media consultant to the Royal Greenwich Observatory, Henbest is now a Future Astronaut with Virgin Galactic.

Married with two stepdaughters, Henbest lives in Hampstead, North Carolina and Loosley Row, Buckinghamshire, UK.

== Early life and education ==
Nigel Henbest was born in West Didsbury, Manchester, where he lived for the first five years of his life. His father, Bernard Henbest, was an organic chemist and his mother, Rosalind (née James) a psychiatrist. In 1958, his father was appointed Professor of Organic Chemistry at Queen's University in Belfast, and Henbest was educated at the Royal Belfast Academical Institution until the age of 18.

Henbest graduated from the University of Leicester in 1972, gaining a First Class honours BSc in astrophysics. Here, he met fellow astronomy student Heather Couper; they formed a working partnership - Hencoup Enterprises - that focused on astronomy popularisation.

== Research ==
Moving to St John's College, Cambridge, Henbest researched at the Cavendish Laboratory, under the then Astronomer Royal, Sir Martin Ryle. During 1972-73 Henbest made pioneering observations of the remnant of Tycho's Supernova (observed by Tycho Brahe in 1572). Then in 1974 he published the first comprehensive observations of quasars and galaxies made with the newly opened Five Kilometre Telescope, now named the Ryle Telescope.

Henbest also researched the optical spectra of quasars at the Royal Greenwich Observatory, before returning to the Department of Geology at Leicester University, to develop and install tiltmeters and a recording seismometer on the active volcano Mount Etna

He has presented research on ancient astronomical observations to the European Association of Archaeologists, and has been an Honorary Professor in the Duncan of Jordanstone College of Art and Design, University of Dundee.

== Career ==
With the publication of his first major book, The Exploding Universe, in 1979 Henbest began a lifelong career as a science communicator - specialising in astronomy and space - across media platforms ranging from magazines and newspapers to radio, television and online.

=== Books and magazines ===
Henbest has written around 50 books, many jointly authored with Heather Couper, including Big Bang (Dorling Kindersley) which won the Times Educational Supplement Senior Book Award.

As well his contributions to major encyclopedias, Henbest has had over 1,000 articles published in international magazines.

In 1982, Henbest was appointed Astronomy Consultant to New Scientist, a post he held for ten years. Having been a columnist for BBC Focus magazine for many years, he now contributes a regular column to The Independent newspaper.

=== Eclipses ===
As guest astronomer, Henbest has led 10 expeditions to view total eclipses of the Sun: Sumatra (1988), Hawaii (1991), Aruba (1998), Alderney (1999), Egypt (2006), China (2009), Tahiti (2010), Idaho, USA (2017), Chile (2019) and Arkansas, USA (2024).

=== Lectures and presentations ===
A former lecturer at the Greenwich Planetarium, Henbest has given public presentations on astronomy and space around the world, from Australia to Colombia and Antarctica. He lectures on cruises, including giving planetarium presentations on the Queen Mary 2.

He has also led tours of major space centres, from the Apollo Mission Control in Houston to the futurist Spaceport America in New Mexico.

=== Radio and television appearances ===
As an astronomy and space expert, Henbest has appeared on BBC Radio 2, Radio 4, Radio 5Live, Radio Scotland, Radio Wales, British Forces Broadcasting Service and many local UK radio stations. For the BBC World Service, he has filed location reports on solar eclipses, the repair of Hubble Space Telescope and spacecraft encounters with planets and comets.

He has also been:

- Chairman of The Litmus Test, BBC Radio 4, 1991-93
- Presenter (with Heather Couper) of Seeing Stars, BBC World Service, 1989-2001

As well as being interviewed about breaking news stories on British television channels, Henbest has featured on several major international TV documentary series:

- 2000's Greatest Tragedies, National Geographic Channel, 2015
- The 80's Greatest Tragedies, National Geographic Channel, 2014
- Meteor Strike, Fireball from Space, Channel 4, 2013
- UFO Europe Untold Stories, National Geographic Channel

Henbest was a member of the University of Leicester's winning team on Christmas University Challenge, BBC2, 30 December 2013.

=== Plays ===
In 1989, Lord Bernard and Lady Josephine Miles invited Henbest to write a play for the Molecule Theatre of Science. Co-authored by Mike Bennett, It’s All in the Stars! was staged at the Bloomsbury and Mermaid Theatres in London, and toured nationally.

=== Consultancy and editorships ===
In 1982, Henbest was appointed Media Consultant to the Royal Greenwich Observatory, with special responsibility for publicising the new Roque de los Muchachos Observatory on La Palma and the opening of the 4.2 m William Herschel Telescope.

The Open University invited Henbest to serve as External Assessor on its new Astronomy module, Matter in the Universe (S256), in 1984.

As well as editing books and magazine supplements, Henbest was appointed as Editor of the Journal of the British Astronomical Association in 1985, redesigning and revitalising the publication.

Henbest was Chairman of National Astronomy Week in 1990, which spearheaded the first national campaign against light pollution in the UK.

=== Online ===
Henbest has presented the regular strand Nigel goes to Space! on the YouTube channel Naked Science.

=== Television production and scriptwriting ===
In 1983, Henbest conceived a TV documentary on the pioneering Infrared Astronomical Satellite, which was filmed by Quanta production company and screened in the BBC television Horizon strand. He delivers presentations on Astronomy and Television at international conferences.

Henbest was consultant on the television series The Planets and The Stars, presented by Heather Couper in 1985 and 1988 on Channel 4. With Couper and the director of The Stars series, Stuart Carter, Henbest set up Pioneer Productions later in 1988. Here Henbest wrote and produced TV programmes and series for both British and American broadcasters. They garnered many documentary awards, including four gold medals and a Grand Award at the New York Festivals. For Universe: Beyond the Millennium, Henbest won the Glaxo-Wellcome/ABSW Science Writers Award for 1999.

== Astronaut ==
In 2009, Henbest signed up with Virgin Galactic for a suborbital flight into space, launching in SpaceShipTwo from the world's first purpose-built commercial spaceport Spaceport America.

As an ambassador for private human spaceflight, Henbest has appeared in Forbes magazine and presents Nigel Goes to Space! on YouTube

== Bibliography ==
=== Books ===
- Space Frontiers, 1978, Woodpecker, ISBN 0856853399
- Exploding Universe, 1979, Marshall Cavendish, ISBN 978-0856855092
- Spotter's Guide to the Night Sky, 1979, Usborne, ISBN 0-86020-284-4
- The Mysterious Universe, 1981, Ebury, ISBN 978-0856859380
- The Restless Universe, 1982, George Philip, ISBN 978-0540010691
- The New Astronomy, 1983, Cambridge University Press, ISBN 978-0521256834
- Astronomy, 1983, Franklin Watts, ISBN 978-0531046517
- Physics, 1983, Franklin Watts, ISBN 978-0531046524
- Observing the Universe (ed.), 1984, Blackwell/New Scientist, ISBN 0-85520-727-2; hardback ISBN 0-85520-726-4 paperback
- Comets, Stars and Planets, 1985, Bookthrift, ISBN 0671076078
- The Planets, 1985, Pan, ISBN 0330290827
- Halley's Comet (ed.), 1985, New Science Publications, ISBN 978-0-67107607-8
- The Sun (Space Scientist), 1986, Franklin Watts, ISBN 0863132693 UK; ISBN 0-531-10055-3 US
- The Moon (Space Scientist), 1986, Franklin Watts, ISBN 0863134726 UK; ISBN 0-531-10266-1 US
- Galaxies and Quasars (Space Scientist), 1986, Franklin Watts, ISBN 0863134734 UK; ISBN 0-531-10265-3 US
- Telescopes and Observatories (Space Scientist), 1987, Franklin Watts, ISBN 0863135277 UK; ISBN 0-531-10361-7 US
- Spaceprobes and Satellites (Space Scientist), 1987, Franklin Watts, ISBN 0863135285 UK; ISBN 0-531-10360-9 US
- The Stars, 1988, Pan, ISBN 033030352X
- The Planets, 1992, Viking, ISBN 0-670-83384-3
- The Space Atlas, 1992, Dorling Kindersley, ISBN 978-0863188299
- The Universe, 1992, Weidenfeld & Nicolson, ISBN 0297831100
- Space Shuttle Discovery, 1993, Channel 4 Books, ISBN 185144081X
- How the Universe Works, 1994, Dorling Kindersley, ISBN 0751300802
- Guide to the Galaxy, 1994, Cambridge University Press, ISBN 978-0521458825
- The Planets: Portraits of New Worlds, 1994, Penguin, ISBN 978-0140134148
- Black Holes, 1996, Dorling Kindersley, ISBN 0-7513-5371-X
- The New Astronomy - completely revised second edition, 1996, Cambridge University Press, ISBN 0521403243 hardback; ISBN 0521408717 paperback
- Black Holes, 1997, Channel 4 Books, ISBN 1851442006
- Big Bang, 1997, Dorling Kindersley, ISBN 978-0789414847
- Is Anybody Out There?, 1998, Dorling Kindersley, ISBN 978-0751356663
- To the Ends of the Universe, 1998, Dorling Kindersley, ISBN 978-0751358254
- Universe, 1999, Channel 4 Books, ISBN 0752217127 hardback; ISBN 0752272551 paperback
- Planets, 1999, Ladybird, ISBN 978-0721418230
- Space Encyclopedia, 1999, Dorling Kindersley, ISBN 978-0789447081
- Space Hopping: The Planets as You've Never Seen Them Before!, 1999, Egmont, ISBN 978-0749739973
- Extreme Universe, 2001, Channel 4 Books, ISBN 978-0752261638
- Mars: The Inside Story of the Red Planet, 2001, Headline, ISBN 978-0747235439
- Encyclopedia of Space, 2003, Dorling Kindersley, ISBN 978-1405301091
- The History of Astronomy, 2009, Cassell Illustrated (UK), ISBN 978-1844035700; Firefly (US), ISBN 978-1554075379
- The Story of Astronomy, 2011, Cassell, ISBN 978-1844037117
- The Astronomy Bible: The Definitive Guide to the Night Sky and the Universe, 2015, Firefly (US), ISBN 978-1770854826; Philip's (UK), ISBN 978-1844038084
- The Secret Life of Space, 2015, Aurum, ISBN 978-1781313930
- Space Visual Encyclopaedia, 2016, Dorling Kindersley, ISBN 978-0241228432
- The Universe Explained: A Cosmic Q&A, 2018, Firefly, ISBN 978-0228100829
- Star Gazing - A Card Deck, 2023, Pyramid, ISBN 978-0753735305
- The Night Sky: An astronomer's guide to the night sky and the universe, 2023, Cassell, ISBN 978-1788404532
- The Colossal Book of Incredible Facts for Curious Minds, 2023, Cassell, ISBN 978-1788404693
- 2025 Stargazing, 2024, Philip's, ISBN 978-1849076524

=== Contributor ===
- Illustrated Encyclopedia of Astronomy and Space, 1976, ed. Ian Ridpath, Macmillan ISBN 9780690018387
- Encyclopedia of Space Travel and Astronomy, 1979, ed. John Man, Octopus ISBN 0706409922
- Longman New Universal Dictionary, 1982, ed. Paul Procter, Longman ISBN 9780582555426
- Encyclopædia Britannica, 1985 Fifteenth Edition, second version, (1985)
- How is it Done?, 1990, Reader's Digest ISBN 9780276420085
- Images of the Universe, 1991, ed. Carole Stott, Cambridge University Press ISBN 0521391784
- Science Encyclopedia, 1993, Dorling Kindersley ISBN 0751350567
- Astronomy Communication, 2003, edd. André Heck and Claus Madsen, Kluwer ISBN 1402013450
- Communicating Astronomy, 2005, ed. T.J. Mahoney, Instituto de Astrofísica de Canarias ISBN 8468904031
- Nothing: From Absolute Zero to Cosmic Oblivion, Amazing Insights into Nothingness, 2013, New Scientist/Profile ISBN 978-1846685187
- The Reducatarian Solution, 2017, ed. Brian Kateman, TarcherPerigee ISBN 9780143129714

=== Magazines ===
- Columnist for The Independent newspaper
- BBC Focus magazine
- New Scientist magazine

== Television productions ==
Year	Title	Notes
1983	IRAS: The Infrared Eye	for BBC
1985	The Planets	7-part series for Channel 4
1988	The Stars	6-part series for Channel 4
1992	ET: Please Phone Earth	for Channel 4 & ABC - GOLD MEDAL, NEW YORK FESTIVALS
1993	Space Shuttle Discovery	for Channel 4
1994	Electric Skies	for Channel 4 - BANFF ROCKIE AWARD FOR POPULAR SCIENCE PROGRAMS - GOLD MEDAL, NEW YORK FESTIVALS
1994	Body Atlas	13-part series for The Learning Channel
1995	On Jupiter	for Discovery - GOLD MEDAL & GRAND AWARD, NEW YORK FESTIVALS
1997	Spaceplanes	for The Learning Channel
1997	Rockets	for The Learning Channel
1997	Black Holes	for Channel 4, Discovery & ABC (Australia) - GOLD MEDAL, BEST SCIENCE DOCUMENTARY, NEW YORK FESTIVALS
1999	Universe:Beyond the Millennium	4-part series for Channel 4 & The Learning Channel - BEST TELEVISION PRODUCTION, GLAXO-WELLCOME/ABSW SCIENCE WRITER AWARD Stars Creation Planets Alien Life
2002	The Day the Earth was Born	for Channel4/WGBH
2002	Edge of the Universe	3-part series for Channel 4 - GOLD SPECIAL JURY AWARD, WORLDFEST HOUSTON
2003	Space Shuttle: Human Time Bomb?	for Channel 4
2006	Challenger: Countdown to Disaster	for National Geographic/Channel 4
2007	Hindenburg	for Smithsonian Networks/Channel 4/ZDF
2008-9	Journey to the Edge of the Universe	for National Geographic (US)/ Discovery Canada/ France 5
2010-14	How the Universe Works 1, 2 & 3	two 8-part series for Discovery
2011	Story of Earth	for National Geographic
2015	How the Universe Works 4	8-part series for Science Channel

== Honours and awards ==
- DSc (Hon) University of Leicester
- Fellow of the Royal Astronomical Society
- Winner of the Glaxo-Wellcome/ABSW Science Writers Award, 1999.
- Minor planet 3795 Nigel, discovered by Eleanor Helin, is named in his honor.
