= Shockwave (jet truck) =

Jet-powered truck

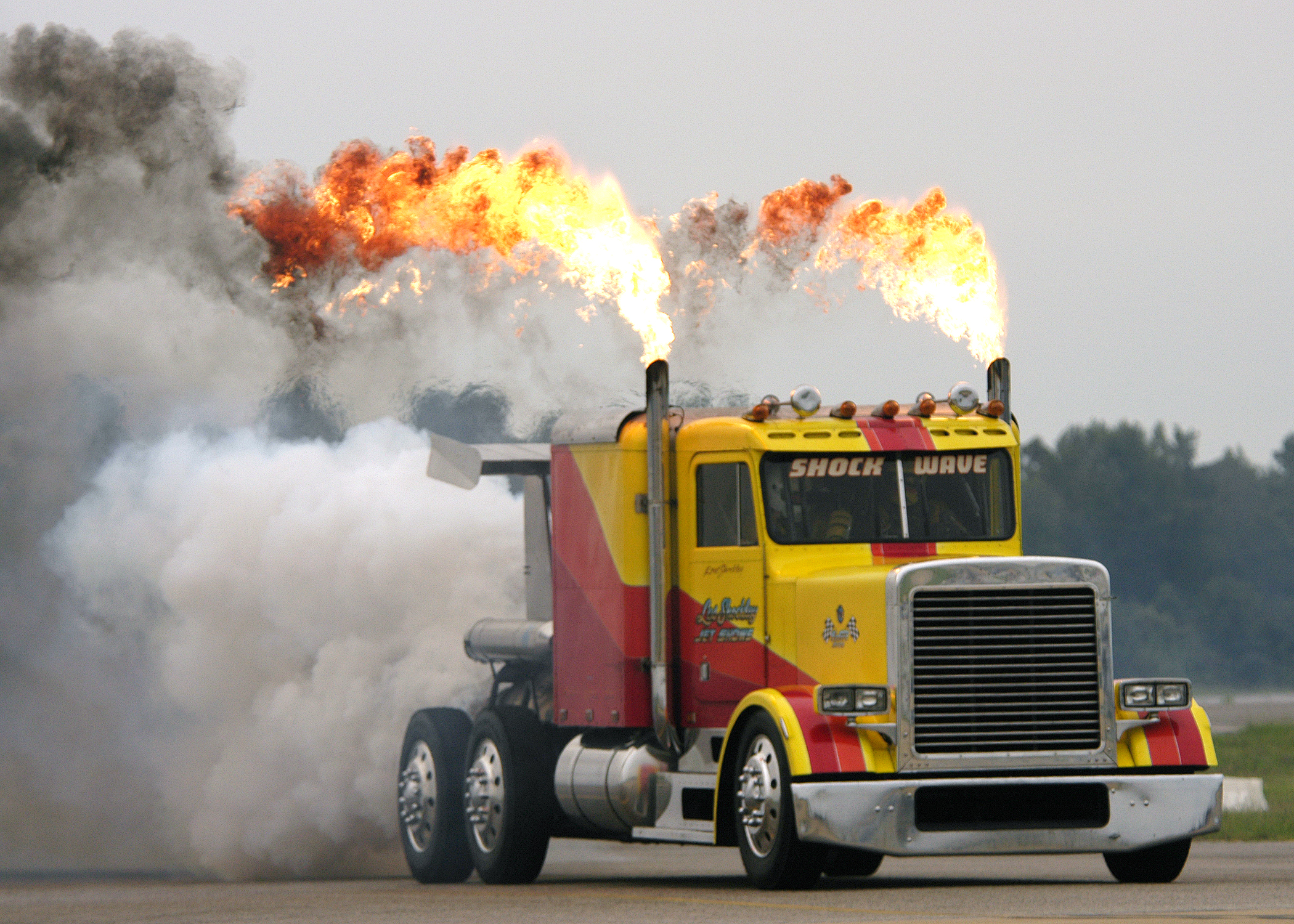
Shockwave at the 2003 Naval Air Station Oceana Regional Air Show

Shockwave is a family of two jet-powered American trucks: Shockwave, a 1984 Peterbilt 359 truck tractor, and Super Shockwave, a 1957 Chevy truck. The original Shockwave truck was destroyed in a 2022 crash; the Super Shockwave truck continues to be used in performances now under ownership of Hayden Proffitt III renamed as “Hot Streak II”.

== Shockwave ==
Debuting for the 1984 season, "Shockwave" was the first of the Shockwave family of trucks. It took the original owner/creator Les Shockley around 4,000 hours to complete the build after moving away from his jet dragster and funny cars. It still holds the world record for jet-powered full-sized trucks at 376 miles per hour (605 km/h).

The truck had three Westinghouse J34-48 jet engines, with a total output of 36,000 horsepower (26,845 kW; 36,499 PS), which allowed the truck to complete the quarter-mile in 6.63 seconds. It consumed fuel at a rate equal to 400 gallons per mile (940 liters per km), even more when the afterburners were activated. To slow the truck down at the end of a race, it needed two aircraft parachutes. Shockwave was bought out by the Darnell racing family around 2012 and initiated a complete restoration to the chassis and body.

=== Crash ===
On July 2, 2022, at 1:10 p.m. EDT at the Battle Creek Field of Flight and Balloon Festival at Battle Creek Executive Airport in Battle Creek, Michigan, the Shockwave Jet Truck experienced a catastrophic rollover event following a mechanical failure, killing the driver Chris Darnell and destroying the truck. The performance involved Darnell racing against two inverted aircraft flown by aerobatic pilots Bill Stein and Rob Holland from a standing start while driving by a large pyrotechnic display, and had been successfully demonstrated by Darnell numerous times in the past. Video of the performance showed Darnell's truck outpacing one of the airplanes overhead and about to overtake another when his truck caught fire and appeared to roll. Darnell Motorsports owner and co-driver Neal Darnell, also father of Chris, attributed his son's crash to a mechanical failure, he said in a Facebook post that evening. Battle Creek police identified a blown tire as the likely cause of the crash.

== Super Shockwave ==
"Super Shockwave" is the more recent of the Shockwave trucks. It has two Westinghouse J34-48 jet engines. The truck is built on a 1957 Chevy truck cab. In the full mile, the truck is able to reach 336 miles per hour (541 km/h).

=== Renaming ===
Super Shockwave was purchased from the Shockley family by Hayden Proffitt Racing and renamed "Hot Streak II". Les Shockley had obtained his start in racing through crewing for Hayden Proffitt, whose first jet car was named "Hot Streak I".

== Gallery ==
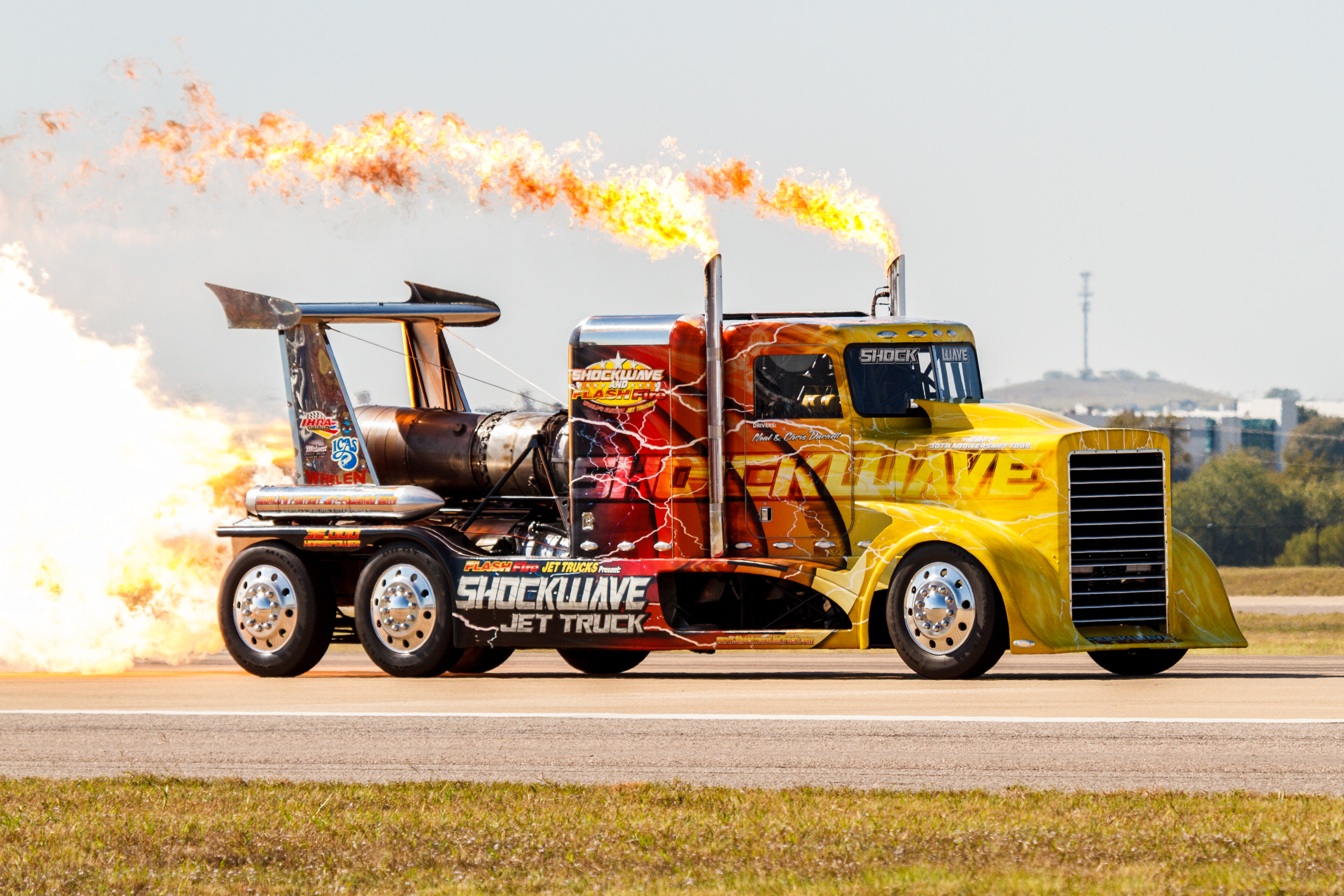
Shockwave performing in Fort Worth, Texas, in 2014

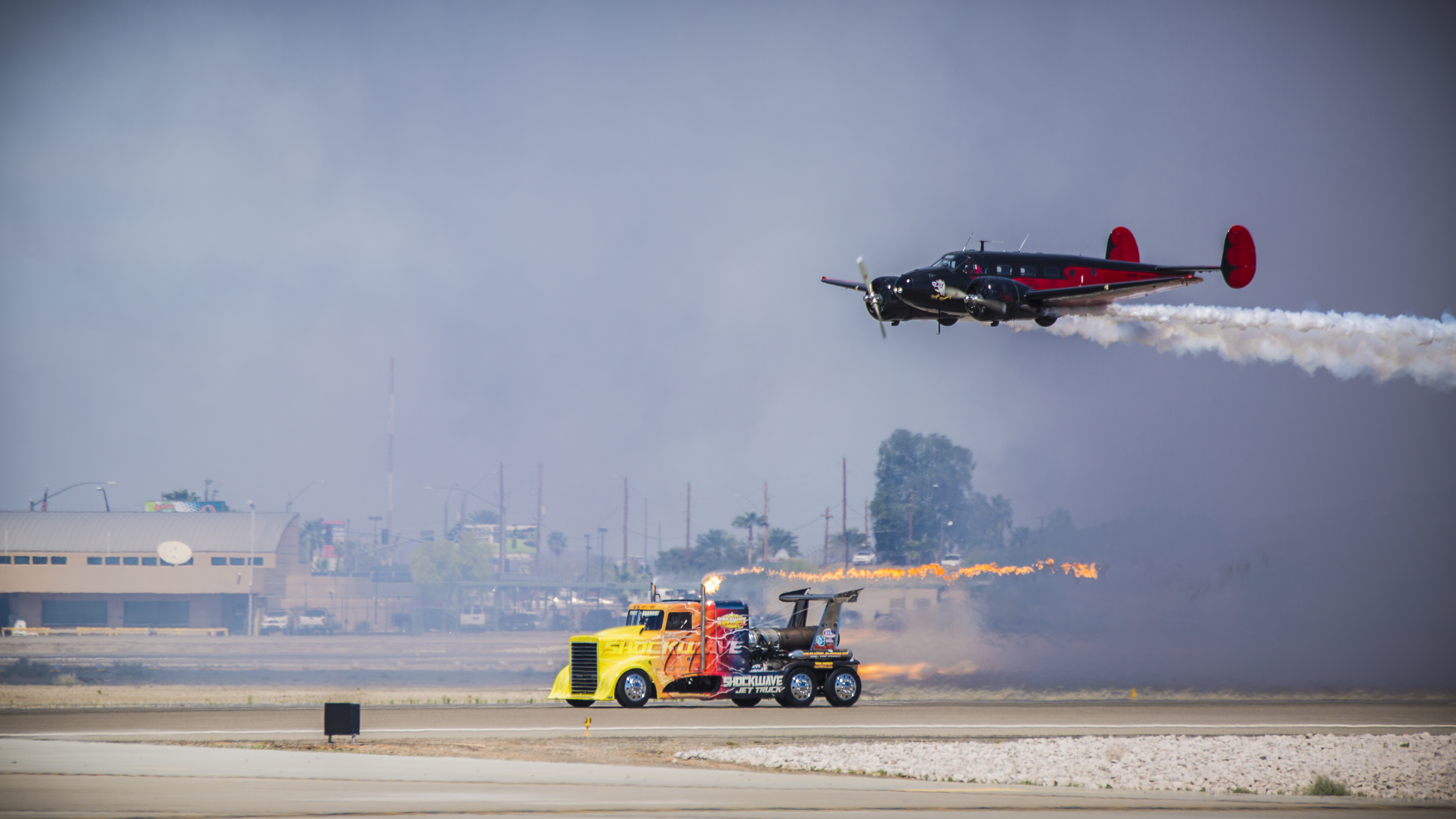
Shockwave racing in Yuma, Arizona, in 2017

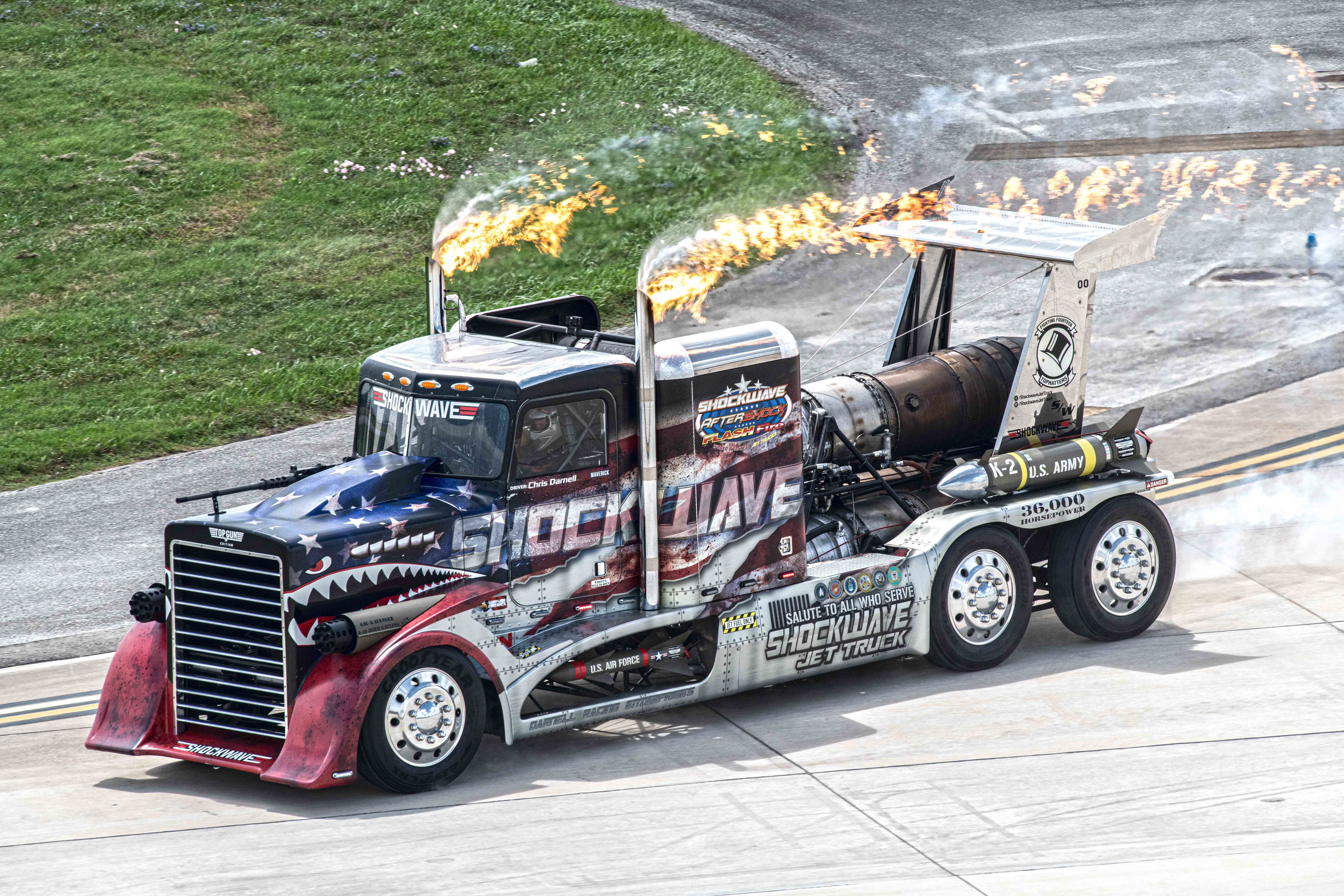
Shockwave at Randolph Air Force Base in 2022

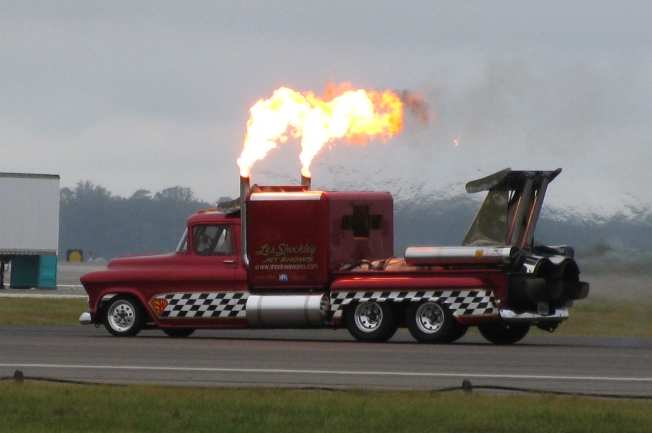
Super Shockwave in 2008

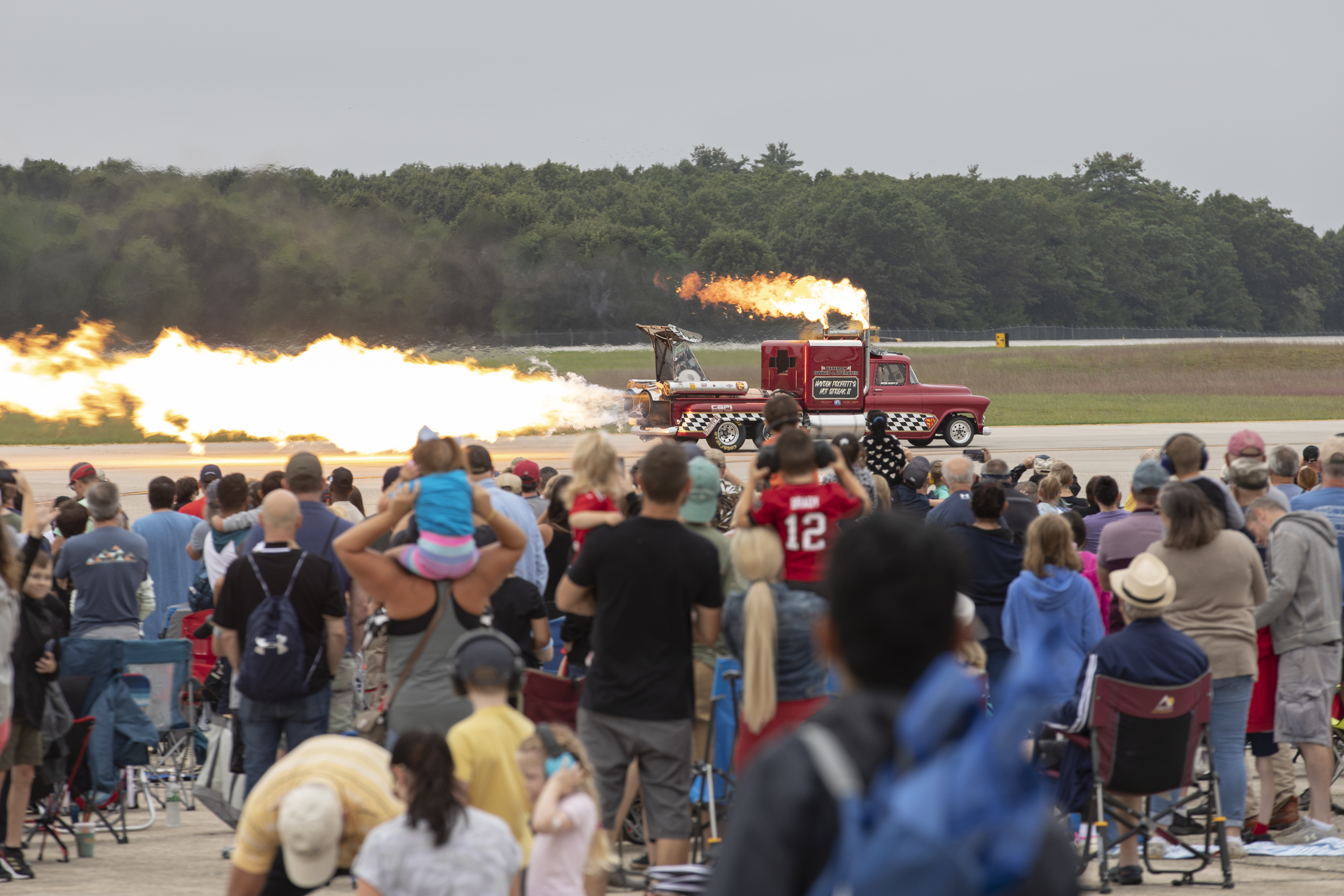
Hot Streak II (formerly Super Shockwave) in New Hampshire in 2023
