= India's Citizen Squad =

Indian reality television show

- Genre: Reality-TV
- Based on: Military Reality Show
- Written by: Richa Pant
- Directed by: Kunal Kocchar
- Country of origin: India

Production
- Producer: Noopur Kaul
- Editor: Bhuwan Chandra

Original release
- Network: Discovery Channel
- Release: 30 November 2018

India's Citizen Squad is a military reality show telecasted by Discovery Channel (Indian TV channel) and uploaded to Veer by Discovery YouTube channel. It features 12 Indian citizens to go under training with camp commander Col. Manish Sarin, a veteran from the Gorkha Rifles along with five ex-special forces soldiers from the MARCOS, NSG and the Para SF.

== List of contestants ==
1. Nilay Sharma from Bengaluru

2. Muntazir Ahmad from Srinagar

3. Ashish Tamang from Darjeeling

4. Sonu Kumar from Muzaffarnagar

5. Sunil Singh from Mumbai

6. Rohit Singh Bhandari from Haldwani

7. Tanushree Chakrabarti from Delhi

8. Himanshu Bishnoi from Hisar

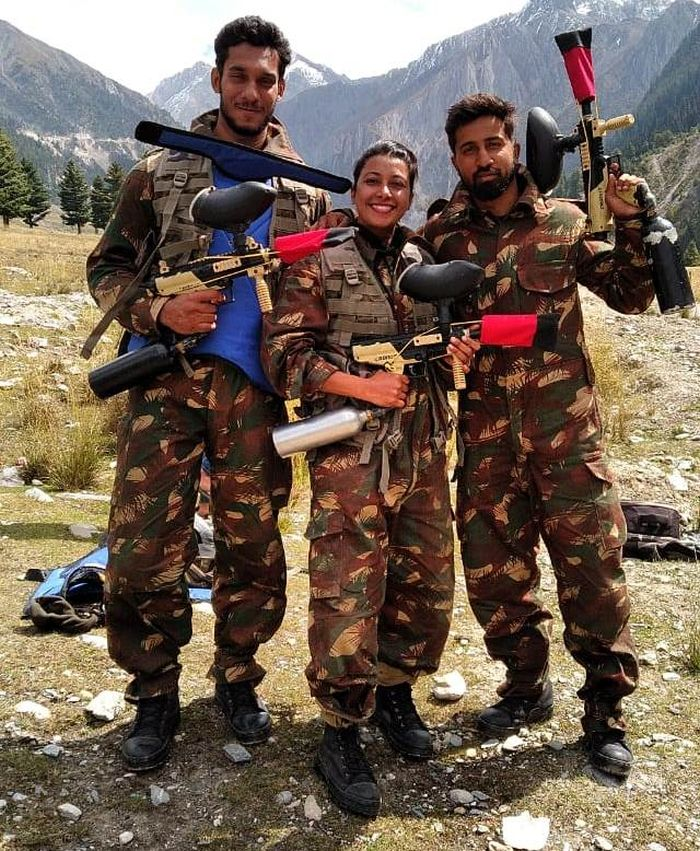
Discovery Channel’s reality show

9. Pallavi Vengurlekar from Delhi

10. Sunny Sehrawat from Delhi

11. Rishab Singh from Delhi

12. Manav Singh Dhillon from Delhi

== Awards ==
The show won the following awards at the 15th edition of the Indian Telly Awards

1. Best Reality Show (won)

2. Best Indian Original Format (Non Fiction/Reality) (won)
