= Indian Telly Award for Best Reality Show =

- Awarded for: Best Reality Show on Television
- Country: India
- Presented by: IndianTelevision.com
- First award: 2002
- Currently held by: Endemol for (Bigg Boss 7) - 2014
- Website: Indian Telly Awards

The Indian Telly Award for Best Reality Show is an award given by IndianTelevision.com as part of its annual Indian Telly Awards for TV serials, to recognize the Best Reality Show for the year.

== Winners ==
The following is the list of Winners of Telly Award for Best Reality Show.

Year	Winner	Producer/Production House
2003	Mental health
2005	Indian Idol	Namit Sharma
2006	Fame Gurukul	Endemol India
2007	Bigg Boss	Endemol India
2008	Bigg Boss 2	Endemol India
2009	Rakhi Ka Swayamwar	SOL Productions
2010	Khatron Ke Khiladi (season 2)	Endemol India
2011	SUPER DANCER
2013	Bigg Boss 6	SAB Tv India
2014	Baalveer	Endemol India

== See also ==
- Indian Telly Award for Best Actor in a Lead Role – Female
- Indian Telly Award for Best Actor in a Lead Role – Male
- Indian Telly Awards
