= Mykel Hawke =

American actor, director, writer, instructor, and retired military officer

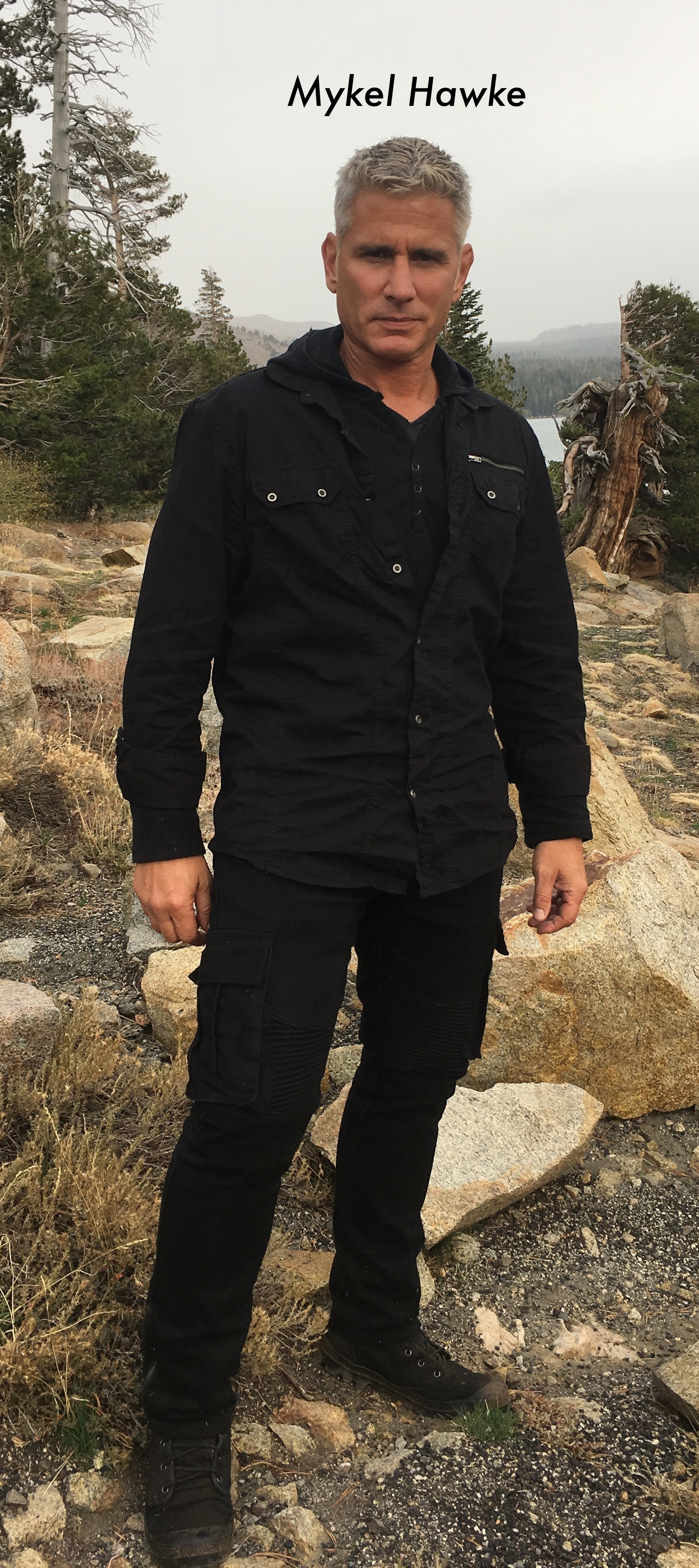
- Hawke, 2026
- Born: November 29, 1965 (age 60); Fort Knox, Kentucky, U.S.
- Occupations: Former Army officer, author, television and film personality
- Years active: 1998–present
- Spouse: Ruth England (2005–present)
- Website: Official website

Mykel Hawke (born November 29, 1965) is an American author, television personality, and retired U.S. Army Special Forces officer, best known for creating and starring in survival television series such as Man, Woman, Wild.

== Biography ==
Hawke earned a bachelor of Science in biology from the University of the State of New York and a Master of Science in family counseling from the University of California. In 2005, Hawke married English television presenter Ruth England. The couple has a son and resides in Miami, Florida. He established a combat medic school in Azerbaijan.

=== Military service ===
Hawke entered the United States Army in 1982, serving 12 years on active duty and 12 years in the Reserve and Army National Guard. He retired as a Captain in 2011 from the 1st Special Forces Command (Airborne) at Fort Bragg, North Carolina.

==== Accolades ====
Mykel Hawke's Awards, Decorations, and Badges
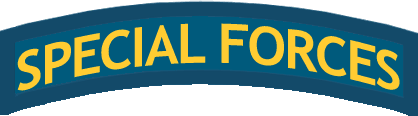

== Television ==
Hawke has appeared in television programs related to survival, military skills, and history.

Year	Title	Role	Network	Notes
2010–2012	Man, Woman, Wild	Co-host	Discovery Channel	Survival reality series co-hosted with Ruth England.
2011–2012	One Man Army	Host	Discovery Channel	Competition series featuring military and law enforcement personnel.
2013	Lost Survivors	Co-host	Travel Channel	Six-episode survival series.
2018	The Men Who Built America: Frontiersmen	Expert / Himself	History	Four-part historical docuseries executive produced by Leonardo DiCaprio.

== Publications ==
Hawke has authored numerous books and manuals, including the following:

- 2000: The Quick and Dirty Guide to Learning Languages Fast – Paladin Press, ISBN 978-1-58160-096-4 (authored under a pen name "A.G.
- 2009: Hawke's Green Beret Survival Manual – Running Press, ISBN 978-0-7624-3358-2
- 2010: In the Dark of the Sun – Pixel Dragon Press, ISBN 978-0-9829316-0-8 (co-authored with Kim Martin)
- 2011: Hawke's Special Forces Survival Handbook: The Portable Guide to Getting Out Alive – Running Press, ISBN 978-0-7624-4064-1
- 2019: Family Survival Guide: The Best Ways for Families to Prepare, Train, Pack, and Survive Everything - Skyhorse Publishing, ISBN 978-1510737945
- 2019: Foraging for Survival: Edible Wild Plants of North America - Skyhorse Publishing, ISBN 978-1510738331
- 2019: The Quick and Dirty Guide to Learning Languages Fast - Racehorse Publishing, ISBN 978-1631583018 (re-issue)
- 2021: Under a Hard Blue Sky - Pixel Dragon Press, ISBN 978-0982931639 (co-authored with Kim Martin)
- 2023: Surviving Extreme Weather: The Complete Climate Change Preparedness Manual - Skyhorse Publishing, ISBN 978-1510777989 (co-authored with Jim N.R. Dale)
- 2023: Dig to the Death - Pixel Dragon Press, ISBN 978-0982931677 (co-authored with Kim Martin)
