= List of assets owned by Warner Bros. Discovery =

Warner Bros. Discovery was an American multinational mass media and entertainment conglomerate based in New York City that was founded on April 8, 2022. It worked in these areas: film, television, cable networks and publishing.

The following is a list of assets that were owned by Warner Bros. Discovery before being acquired by Paramount Skydance on October 6, 2026. The company's assets were reported under two segments: Streaming and Studios (which consists of the Warner Bros. film and television studios, consumer products, video gaming, licensing and publishing divisions as well as HBO and HBO Max) and Global Linear Networks (which consists of the company's domestic and international television portfolio including its entertainment, lifestyle, news, sports networks and Discovery+). As of November 8, 2026, the current incarnation of Skydance continues to own all of these assets along with those of the former Paramount Skydance.

== Streaming and Studios ==
=== Warner Bros. Entertainment ===
==== Warner Bros. Motion Picture Group ====
- Warner Bros. Pictures
  - Warner Bros. Pictures Animation
  - Swaybox Studios
- New Line Cinema
- Warner Bros. Clockwork
- Castle Rock Entertainment (brand, trademark and back library)
- Spyglass Media Group (minority stake)
- Warner Bros. Pictures Domestic Distribution (North American exhibition)
- Warner Bros. Pictures International Distribution (international distribution and production; most active in France, Germany, Italy, Spain, the United Kingdom, the Republic of Ireland, Poland, the Philippines, Japan, Taiwan, Thailand, South Korea, Argentina, Brazil and Mexico)
  - Warner Bros. Film Productions Germany

==== Warner Bros. Television Group ====
- Warner Bros. Television Studios
  - WBTVS Scripted Production
    - Alloy Entertainment
  - WBTVS Unscripted Production
    - Telepictures
      - Telepictures Music
      - DC All Access
      - True Crime News
    - Warner Horizon Unscripted Television
    - Shed Media
  - Bonanza Productions
  - NS Pictures
  - Warner Bros. Television Workshop
  - Creative Group
  - Warner Bros. Domestic Television Distribution
  - Warner Bros. International Television Distribution
- Warner Bros. Animation
  - Cartoon Network Studios
- Hanna-Barbera Studios Europe
- Turner Classic Movies

==== Other ====
- Warner Bros. Studio Facilities
  - Warner Bros. Museum
  - Warner Bros. Studios Burbank
  - Warner Bros. Studios Leavesden
  - Warner Bros. International Dubbing & Subtitling
- Warner Bros. Digital Networks
  - Warner Bros. Digital Labs
  - OneFifty
  - Sports & Entertainment Digital Network
  - Warner Bros. Digital & Online
  - Warner Bros. Podcast Network
- Warner Bros. Home Entertainment
  - Discovery Home Entertainment
  - Warner Bros. Anti-Piracy Operations
- Warner Bros. Theatre Ventures
- DC Entertainment
- DC Studios
- Warner Bros. Japan
  - Warner Bros. Japan Anime Production
- Geffen Pictures
- WaterTower Music
- Fandango Media (25%; with Versant)
  - Fandango (movie ticketing platform)
  - Fandango (streaming service)
  - INDY Cinema Group
  - MovieTickets.com
  - Rotten Tomatoes
    - Rotten Tomatoes Movieclips
- Cartoon Network Enterprises
- Turner Entertainment Co.
- Wolper Organization
- Flagship Entertainment Group (with China Media Capital (41%) and TVB (10%))

=== Warner Bros. Streaming ===
- WBTV (FAST streaming channels)

==== Home Box Office, Inc. ====
- HBO Max
- HBO
  - HBO Latino
  - HBO Comedy
  - HBO Drama
  - HBO Movies
  - HBO Hits
  - HBO International
    - HBO Asia
      - HBO Family
      - HBO Hits
      - HBO Signature
    - HBO New Zealand
    - HBO Europe
      - HBO2
      - HBO3
    - HBO Latin America
      - HBO Brasil
      - HBO Caribbean
      - HBO2
      - HBO Plus (HBO+)
      - HBO Family
      - HBO Signature
      - HBO Mundi
      - HBO Pop
      - HBO Xtreme
- Cinemax
  - Cinemax Hits
  - Cinemax Action
  - Cinemax Classics
  - Cinemáx (Spanish-language)
  - Cinemax on Demand
  - Cinemax International
    - Cinemax (Europe)
      - Cinemax 2 (Europe)
    - Cinemax (Latin America)
    - Cinemax (Asia)
- HBO Bulk
- HBO Films
- HBO Documentary Films

==== TNT Sports International ====
- TNT Sports (United Kingdom) (50% with BT Group)
  - TNT Sports 1
  - TNT Sports 2
  - TNT Sports 3
  - TNT Sports 4
  - TNT Sports 5
  - TNT Sports 6
  - TNT Sports 7
  - TNT Sports 8
  - TNT Sports 9
  - TNT Sports 10
  - TNT Sports Ultimate
  - TNT Sports Box Office
  - TNT Sports Box 2
  - TNT Sports Films
- TNT Sports (Argentina)
- TNT Sports (Brazil)
- TNT Sports (Chile)
  - TNT Sports HD
  - TNT Sports 2
  - TNT Sports 3
- TNT Sports (México)

=== Warner Bros. Global Experiences ===
- Warner Bros. Discovery Global Themed Entertainment
  - Warner Bros. Theme Parks
    - Parque Warner Madrid (5%)
  - Warner Bros. Studio Tours
    - Warner Bros. Studio Tour Hollywood
    - Warner Bros. Studio Tour London – The Making of Harry Potter
    - Warner Bros. Studio Tour Tokyo - The Making of Harry Potter
    - Warner Bros. Studio Tour Shanghai - The Making of Harry Potter
- Warner Bros. Discovery Global Consumer Products
  - Warner Bros. Games
    - Avalanche Software
    - NetherRealm Studios
    - Portkey Games
    - Rocksteady Studios
    - TT Games
      - TT Games Publishing
      - TT Fusion
      - Traveller's Tales
      - TT Odyssey
    - WB Games Boston
    - WB Games Montréal
    - WB Games New York
    - WB Games San Francisco
  - Warner Bros. Discovery Publications
    - DC Comics
      - MAD
      - DC Black Label
      - Vertigo Comics
      - DC's Young Animal
      - Sandman Universe
      - Hill House Comics
      - Murphyverse
    - DC Graphic Novels for Kids
    - DC Graphic Novels for Young Adults
    - Milestone Media
    - Wonder Comics
    - WildStorm
    - DC Universe Infinite

== Global Linear Networks ==
=== Entertainment, Factual & Lifestyle Group ===
- Discovery+
- Philo (joint venture with A+E Global Media, AMC Global Media and Paramount Skydance)
- Discovery Studios
- Discovery Digital Studios
- Discovery Adventures (out-of-home brand)
- Discovery at Sea (joint venture with Princess Cruises)
- The Cartoon Network, Inc.
  - Cartoon Network
    - Boomerang
    - Cartoonito
  - Williams Street
    - Adult Swim
    - Toonami
- Turner Broadcasting System
  - TBS
  - TNT
  - TruTV
- American Heroes Channel
- Animal Planet
- Discovery Channel
  - Discovery en Español
- Discovery Family (60% with Hasbro)
  - Discovery Familia
- Discovery Turbo
- Investigation Discovery
- Science Channel
- Destination America
- Discovery Life
- HGTV
  - Hogar de HGTV
- Travel Channel
- Magnolia Network (joint venture with Chip and Joanna Gaines’ XVI, LLC)
- Television Food Network, G.P. (69% with Nexstar Media Group)
  - Food Network
  - Cooking Channel
  - Food.com
- Oprah Winfrey Network (95% with Harpo Productions)
- TLC

=== Warner Bros. Discovery News & Sports ===
- CNN
  - CNN en Español
  - CNN Business
  - CNN app
- CNN International
- CNN Films
- HLN
- Great Big Story
- TNT Sports
  - TNT Sports Interactive
    - NCAA.com (joint venture with the NCAA)
    - PGA.com (joint venture with PGA of America)
    - Bleacher Report (website)
      - House of Highlights (social media network)
  - MLB Network (cable channel; 16.67% with Major League Baseball, NBC Sports Group, Charter Communications and Cox Communications)
  - Golf Digest (magazine)
- Eurosport
  - Eurosport.com (EMEA & Asia-Pacific)

=== Warner Bros. Discovery International ===
- Animal Planet
- Boomerang
- Cartoon Network
- Adult Swim
- Cartoonito
- Discovery Channel
- TNT
  - TNT Novelas
  - TNT Series
- TruTV
- Discovery Turbo
- Discovery Kids
- DMAX
- Food Network
- HGTV
- Science Channel
- Investigation Discovery
- Travel Channel
- TLC
- Warner TV
- Warner Bros. International Television Production
  - Warner Bros. Television Studios UK
    - Renegade Pictures
    - Ricochet
    - Twenty Twenty Television
    - Wall to Wall Media
  - WBITVP Australia
  - WBITVP Latin America
  - WBITVP Nederland
  - WBITVP New Zealand
  - WBITVP Nordics
  - WBITVP France
  - WBITVP Belgium
  - WBITVP Spain
  - WBITVP Portugal

==== Warner Bros. Discovery Americas ====
- Discovery Home & Health
- Discovery Theater
- Discovery World
- HTV
- Raze
- Golf Channel Latin America
- Space
- Tooncast

==== Warner Bros. Discovery Asia-Pacific ====
- Asian Food Network
- tvN (Asian TV channel)
  - tvN Movies
  - tvN Movies Pinoy
- JTBC (5.72%)
- World Heritage Channel
- Discovery Japan
  - Animal Planet
  - Cartoon Network
  - Discovery Japan Inc. (joint venture with JCom)
  - Movieplus
  - LaLa TV
  - MONDO TV
  - TABI Channel
- Warner Bros. Discovery India
  - Discovery Tamil
  - Pogo

==== Warner Bros. Discovery Europe, Middle East and Africa ====
- Boing (49% with MFE - MediaForEurope)
  - Boing (Africa)
  - K2 (49% with Mediaset)
  - Frisbee (49% with Mediaset)
  - Boing (Italy) (49% with Mediaset)
  - Boing (Spain) (50% with Mediaset España)
- Fatafeat
- Quest
  - Quest Red
- Really
- Tele 5
- Warner Bros. Discovery Italy
  - Giallo
  - Nove
  - Real Time
- Warner Bros. Discovery Denmark
  - 6'eren
  - Canal 9
  - Kanal 4
  - Kanal 5 (Denmark)
- Warner Bros. Discovery Finland
  - TV5
  - Kutonen
  - Frii
- Warner Bros. Discovery Norway
  - TVNorge Gruppen
    - TVNorge
    - FEM
    - MAX
    - VOX
    - Rex (Norwegian TV channel)
- Warner Bros. Discovery Sweden
  - Kanal 5 (Sweden)
  - Kanal 9
  - Kanal 11

==== TVN Warner Bros. Discovery ====
- Discovery Historia
- Metro
- TVN Group
  - TVN
  - TVN 7
  - TVN24
    - TVN24 BiS
  - TVN Fabula
  - TVN International
    - TVN International Extra
  - TVN Style
  - TVN Turbo
  - TTV
  - Canal+ Poland (32%; with Canal+ Group and Liberty Global)

== Other ==
- All Elite Wrestling (minority share)

== Former assets ==
=== Dormant or shuttered ===
These are Warner Bros. Discovery divisions which have been closed or folded into another part of the company.

- 3net - 3D television channel jointly owned with Sony and IMAX Corporation; operated from 2011 to 2014
- 7food network
- Adult Swim (UK & Ireland)
- AT&T SportsNet - shut down on October 21, 2023
  - AT&T SportsNet Pittsburgh - sold to Fenway Sports Group
  - AT&T SportsNet Southwest - sold to a joint venture between the Houston Rockets and Houston Astros (50% stake)
  - AT&T SportsNet Rocky Mountain - ceased operations at the end of 2023
  - Root Sports Northwest (29% stake with Baseball Club of Seattle, LP) - had sold its stake to the Mariners in January 2024
- AIMS Multimedia - acquired by Discovery Education in 2004
- Altschul Group Corporation - acquired by Discovery Education in 2003
  - FilmFair Communications
- Animal Planet Italy
- Associated Artists Productions - bought 1933–1957 Fleischer/Famous Studios Popeye cartoons and pre-1950 WB library in 1956; the latter library would find its way back to Warner ownership in 1996 as part of the Turner merger (which also incorporated the Popeye cartoons)
- Animalist
- Achievement Hunter - closed in 2023
- Bamzu.com
- Beme Inc. - merged into CNN Digital Studios in 2018
- Big Pixel Studios
- Blue Ribbon Content - closed in 2020
- Boomerang Germany - closed in 2018 and replaced by Boomerang CEE with German advertisements.
- Boomerang (Latin America) - closed in 2021 and replaced by Cartoonito (Latin America)
- Brut Productions - acquired by Turner Broadcasting System from Faberge Inc. in 1982; library currently owned by Turner Entertainment Co.
- Beyond The Lot
- C4
- California Video Center
- Canal 8 Sport
- Cartoonito (Spain)
- Cartoon Network Amazone - closed in 2022 and replaced by Columbia Pictures Aquaverse
- Cartoon Network Hotel - closed on January 1, 2026 and replaced by Dutch Wonderland Inn
- Cartoon Network On-Air - Replaced by the Creative Group in 2010
- Cartoon Network (Spain) - Shut down in 2013 and replaced by the Spanish version of Boing
- Cartoon Network Too
- Castle Rock Entertainment (original) - Dormant until 2021, but still existed as an in-name-only unit.
- Castle Rock Television - Folded into Warner Bros. Television
- China Entertainment Television - 36% stake held by Turner Broadcasting System; ceased broadcasting in 2016
- Clearvue & SVE - acquired by Discovery Education in 2006
- CNN Airport
- CNN Checkout Channel
- CNNfn
- CNN Philippines (Nine Media Corporation and Radio Philippines Network) - closed on February 1, 2024 and replaced by RPTV
- CNN Pipeline
- CNN/SI
- CNN+ (in conjunction with CNN Worldwide) - second incarnation; shut down on April 28, 2022
- CNN+ (Spanish TV network) - first incarnation; joint venture with Sogecable
- CNN Money Switzerland - joint venture with MediaGo
- Cooking Channel (Canada) (19.8%) - shut down on December 31, 2024
- Crime Library
- DC Entertainment - folded into DC Comics in 2023
- DC Universe (SVOD) - shut down with catalog absorbed into HBO Max and spun off into DC Universe Infinite on January 21, 2021
- Discovery Channel Multimedia
- Discovery Channel Radio
- Discovery Channel Romania
- Discovery Civilization
- Discovery Destinations Hotels & Resorts (joint venture with Scottford Enterprises)
- Discovery Family (France) - shut down in 2022
- Discovery Family Go - shut down on May 2, 2022
- Discovery Films
- Discovery Geschichte
- Discovery Health Channel
- Discovery Home & Health Southeast Asia
- Discovery Home & Health UK
- Discovery Kids Australia
- Discovery Kids UK
- Discovery People
- Discovery Real Time
- Discovery Real Time France
- Discovery Science CEEMEA - shut down on January 5, 2024
- Discovery Science France - shut down on February 26, 2024; replaced by TLC
- Discovery Shed
- Discovery Travel & Living
- Discovery Wings
- Discovery World Europe
- DKids
- DMAX MENA
- Dplay - replaced in available regions by Discovery+
- DTX - shut down on January 5, 2024
- DramaFever - shut down in 2018
- Ellen Digital Ventures (joint venture between Warner Bros. Digital Networks and Ellen DeGeneres)
  - A Very Good Production
    - eleveneleven – Defunct 2012.
- Eurosport - merged/absorbed into TNT Sports in 2025
  - Eurosport 1
  - Eurosport 2
    - Eurosport 2 Xtra (Germany)
  - Eurosport 360
  - Eurosport Norge
  - Esporte Interativo - TV channels shut down in 2018; brand replaced by TNT Sports in 2021
  - Eurosport 360°
  - Eurosport 2 Xtra (Portugal)
  - Eurosport News
  - Eurosport Player - replaced in available regions by Discovery+
  - Eurosport Plus
- FandangoNOW
- Festival
- FilmBuff
- FilmStruck - shut down in 2018
- Fine Living Europe
- Fine Living Italy
- First National Pictures - acquired by Warner Bros. in 1928 and closed in 1936
- FitTV
- Food Network (New Zealand)
- Four
- Fullscreen, Inc. - team laid off and company absorbed into WBD Ad Sales
  - McBeard
  - Reelio
- Funhaus - Closed in 2024
- GCN+ and GCN app - closed on December 19, 2023
- Glitz - closed on February 29, 2024
- Global Digital Media Xchange
- Golf World (magazine)
- GolfTV - dissolved into Discovery+ in 2022
- Good Food
- GXT
- Hanna-Barbera - absorbed into Warner Bros. Animation
  - Hanna-Barbera Home Video
  - Hanna-Barbera Poland
- HBO Animation
- HBO Defined (India)
- HBO Family - Shut down on August 15, 2025
- HBO Now - replaced/dissolved by HBO Max
- HBO Downtown Productions — dissolved in 2001; pre-1992 library owned by HBO
- HBO Hits (India)
- HBO Independent Productions
- HBO Netherlands - joint venture with Ziggo
- HBO Go - replaced by HBO Max in the United States, Latin America, Nordics, Spain, Portugal, Central and Eastern Europe, was also active in Asian countries, until it folded and converted into simply Max which merging HBO Max and Discovery+ on November 19, 2024
  - HBO Nordic
  - HBO Portugal
  - HBO España
- HBO NYC Productions (formerly called HBO Showcase) - folded into HBO Films
- HBO Home Entertainment - transferred and folded into Warner Bros. Home Entertainment in 2019
- HBO Latin America Group - transferred and folded into Warner Bros. Discovery Latin America Group
- HBO Kids - discontinued on February 29, 2024
- Headstrong Pictures
- HOOQ (streaming service joint venture with Sony Pictures Entertainment and Singtel) - shut down on 30 April 2020 due to liquidation and eventually sold to Coupang in July 2020 to form the nucleus of its streaming service named Coupang Play
- I.Sat - closed on February 29, 2024
- In2TV - joint venture between AOL and Warner Bros. Television, integrated into AOL Video in December 2006
- iStreamPlanet - shuttered in 2023
- Legacy Releasing folded into Warner Home Video in 1999
- Lorimar Film Entertainment
  - Monogram Pictures/Allied Artists Pictures Corporation - sold to Lorimar in 1979; post-August 17, 1946 library currently owned by Warner Bros. Entertainment
    - Interstate Television - founded in the early 1950s as the TV arm of Allied Artists, became Allied Artists Television in the 1960s and was folded into Lorimar with the rest of AAPC in 1979
- Lorimar Home Video - folded into Warner Home Video in 1988
- Lorimar Records
- Lorimar Television
  - Rankin/Bass Productions - post-1974 library currently owned by Warner Bros.
  - ZIV International - acquired by Lorimar Productions in 1982; the library contents were sold to Coral Pictures in 1986.
- Machinima, Inc. - merged into Fullscreen in 2019
- Momlogic
- Mondo Mah-jong TV - ceased broadcasting on March 31, 2022, due to the closure of the platform that carried the channel.
- Monolith Productions – closed in February 2025
- MotorTrend+ (subscription streaming service) - closing at the end of March 2024, with most of its subscribers and programming migrating to Discovery+ and Max
- MuchMusic - closed on February 29, 2024
- MovieMax - Shut down on August 15, 2025
- National General Pictures - sold to Warner Bros. in 1973
- Nelson Entertainment - acquired by New Line Cinema in 1991; library currently owned by Amazon MGM Studios (via Orion Pictures)
  - Embassy Home Entertainment - former divisions of its sister company, Embassy Pictures
  - Galactic Films, Inc.
  - Spikings Corporation
  - Charter Entertainment
- New Line Home Entertainment - folded into Warner Home Video
- New Line Television - folded into Warner Bros. Television
- New Line Television Pay-Per-View - folded into Warner Bros. Television Distribution
- Oh!K
- Outright Distribution
- Otter Media - folded into WarnerMedia Entertainment on May 31, 2019
- OuterMax - Shut down on August 15, 2025
- Pathé UK - folded into Warner Bros. Entertainment UK
- People's Court Raw
- Player First Games – closed in February 2025
- Prime Time Entertainment Network
- Quest Arabiya
- Quibi - Minority stake; shut down.
- Red by HBO (24/7 Asian cinema channel; joint venture with Mei Ah Entertainment) - ceased broadcasting on July 1, 2021
- Redknot - production company jointly owned by Discovery Kids Latin America and Nelvana
- Revision3
  - Rev3Games
  - What's the Big Deal?
- Setanta Sports Asia
- Seven Arts Productions – merged with Warner Bros. in 1967
- Shed Productions - folded into Wall to Wall
- Snowblind Studios - merged into Monolith Productions in 2012
- Stage 13 - closed in 2022.
- Screwattack - Folded into Death Battle
- Studio T - combined Turner brand name for TBS Productions and TNT Productions; dissolved in 2019
- Super Deluxe
- TBS (Latin America) - closed in 2023 and replaced by TNT Novelas
- Switchover Media
- TCM Movies
- ThreeLife
- ThrillerMax - Shut down on August 15, 2025
- Tabi Tele - ceased broadcasting on March 31, 2022, due to the closure of the platform that carried the channel.
- Take 2
- Toonami (channels in India, Southeast Asia, and UK & Ireland)
- TNT Sweden - closed in 2019
- Toonami (UK and Ireland) - originally CNX until 2003; closed in 2007 and replaced by Cartoon Network Too (version 2)
- TruTV (Latin America) - closed in 2023 and replaced by Adult Swim (Latin America)
- Turner Broadcasting System - closed in 2019
  - Turner Broadcasting System Latin America
  - Turner International Argentina
- Turner Classic Movies 2
- Turner Classic Movies (Asia)
- Turner Classic Movies (Northern Europe)
- Turner Home Entertainment - folded into Warner Home Video as an in-name-only unit in December 1996
- Turner Japan - Japanese division which operations were absorbed into Discovery Japan on 1 August 2023
- Turner Pictures - folded into Warner Bros.
- Turner Program Services - folded into Warner Bros. Television Distribution
- Turner Studios
- Vivolta (20% stake)
- Vox Media (minority share)
- Warner Bros. Cartoons
- Warner Bros. Domestic Pay TV, Cable & Network Features - a former division of Warner Bros. Domestic Television Distribution that licensed Warner Bros. feature films, television series, miniseries, TV films, and specials to the pay television and basic cable markets, as well as feature films to the broadcast networks. Formed in 1994, it was re-organized in 2001 as “Warner Bros. Domestic Cable Distribution”, before folding into Warner Bros. Domestic Television Distribution in 2008
- Warner Bros. Family Entertainment - closed in 2011
- Warner Bros. Feature Animation
- Warner Bros. Global Kids, Young Adults and Classics - closed in 2022
- Warner Bros. Jungle Habitat
- Warner Bros. Studio Store
- WB Channel
- WB Games San Diego – closed in February 2025
- Watershed Television
- Warner Horizon Scripted Television - merged into Warner Bros. Television Studios in 2020
- WarnerMax - short-lived film production company joint venture by Warner Bros. and HBO Max, it closed down in October 2020
- Warner Independent Pictures - closed in 2008
- Warner Premiere - closed in 2013
  - Warner Premiere Digital
  - Raw Feed
- Warner Alliance - a now-defunct contemporary Christian music division owned by Warner Music Group, which operated until 1998. The company was dissolved by Warner purchasing Word Entertainment.
- Warner Leisure, Inc. - 80% stake; previously known as Leisure Development Corp. of America; closed in 1985
- Warner Resound - a now-defunct Christian division of Warner Music Group, focused on distributing Christian music and media, as well as products from other artists like Vigilantes of Love and The Call. The company largely became dormant after Word Entertainment was sold to Warner Music Group.
- WarnerVision Entertainment - folded into Warner Home Video in 2002.
  - KidVision - folded into Warner Home Video in 2004.
  - A*Vision Entertainment
  - NightVision
  - BodyVision
- Warner Music Entertainment - folded into Warner Home Video in 2013.
  - Warner Music Vision
  - Warner Vision International
  - Warner Vision Australia
- Weintraub Entertainment Group - 15% stake previously held by Columbia Pictures
- The WB - 64% joint venture with Tribune Broadcasting; closed in 2006.
- World Championship Wrestling (WCW) - video library, selected wrestler contracts and other intellectual property sold to World Wrestling Federation Entertainment, Inc., now known as WWE (World Wrestling Entertainment), through its subsidiary W. Acquisition Company (which was subsequently renamed WCW Inc. following the sale) in 2001.
- Yalli Productions

=== Divested ===
- AOL - spun-off in 2009 and acquired by Verizon Communications in 2015, thus operating under Verizon's media division from 2017 to 2021 and then Yahoo Inc. from 2021 to 2026. AOL is currently owned by Bending Spoons.
- Atari, Inc. - sold to Jack Tramiel on July 1, 1984, for 50 dollars cash and 240 million in stock and notes.
- ACC Select
- All3Media - 50% stake with Liberty Global; sold to RedBird IMI in 2024 for £1.15 billion ($1.45 billion)
  - Company Pictures
  - Lime Pictures
  - Neal Street Productions
  - New Pictures
  - Seven Stories - closed in 2025
  - South Pacific Pictures
    - SLR Productions
  - Two Brothers Pictures
  - 141 Productions
  - Aurora Media Worldwide
  - Lion Television
  - Maverick Television
  - North One Television
  - Optomen
  - Raw TV
  - Silverback Films
  - Studio Lambert
  - Objective Media Group
    - Objective Media Group America
  - West Road Pictures
  - IDTV (Netherlands)
  - Little Dot Studios
- Anglia Television Entertainment - 49% stake with United News & Media; HBO sold its stake in 1999.
  - Cosgrove Hall Films
- Atlanta Braves - Transferred to Liberty Media in exchange for 60 million shares of Time Warner stock (valued at $1.27 billion) held by Liberty Media.
- Atlanta Hawks
- Atlanta Thrashers
- Bad Wolf - minority stake; sold to Sony Pictures Television in 2021.
- BET Holdings, Inc. - 15% with Robert L. Johnson, BET executives and shareholders, Taft Television & Radio Company and Liberty Media/Tele-Communications, Inc., sold its stake in 1996; currently owned by Paramount Skydance through its Paramount Media Networks division.
  - BET Action Pay-Per-View - purchased by TVN Entertainment Corp. in 2001
  - BET on Jazz
- Central European Media Enterprises - 75% equity holding; sold to PPF in August 2020.
- Chilevisión - sold to Paramount Networks Americas in 2021 and later sold to Vytal Group Ltd. in 2026.
- Comedy Central (50% with Viacom) - sold its stake in 2003; currently owned by Paramount Skydance.
- CourtTV - brand name and pre-2008 original programming library acquired by Katz Broadcasting/E. W. Scripps Company in December 2018.
- Crunchyroll - sold to Sony's joint venture anime division Funimation, run by Sony Pictures and Sony Music Entertainment Japan's Aniplex, in 2021; the merged company was branded entirely as Crunchyroll, LLC in 2022, with the Funimation name continuing to be used for its streaming service until the merger is completed.
  - VRV - included in the sale and also folded into Crunchyroll
- The CW - 9.5% with Paramount Skydance (9.5%) and Nexstar Media Group (81%); sold to Nexstar as of 2026.
  - The CW Plus (secondary national broadcast syndication service feed)
  - CW Seed (FAST streaming service)
- Discovery Digital Networks - sold to Group Nine Media in 2016
- Discovery Education - majority stake sold to Francisco Partners in 2018 and Clearlake Capital in 2022
- E! - Time Warner's stake acquired by Comcast and The Walt Disney Company in 1997.
- Game Show Network, LLC — 42% stake acquired by co-owner Sony Pictures Television in 2019.
- GameTap - sold to Metaboli in 2008, later closed in 2010.
- Global Cycling Network - sold back privately in 2024
- Great American Country - sold to GAC Media in 2021 and rebranded as GAC Family
- Hello Sunshine (joint venture with Reese Witherspoon, Seth Rodsky and Emerson Creative) - sold
- HowStuffWorks - sold to Blucora in 2014
- Hulu (10% stake) - sold to Hulu, LLC, but was allocated between The Walt Disney Company (7%) and Comcast (3%); Disney acquired majority interest (67%) of Hulu with Comcast as minority partner (33%) in 2019 until early 2024, when Disney acquired the remaining interest in Hulu.
- LazyTown Entertainment - sold back to Magnús Scheving in 2024.
- Lumiere Pictures and Television – minority stake from 1995 to 1996; sold to UGC and Groupe Canal+ in 1996
- Metro-Goldwyn-Mayer - between 1967 and 1969 was owned by Time Inc. as a shareholder; briefly owned by Turner Broadcasting System in 1986; sold back to Kirk Kerkorian later that year and currently owned by Amazon (through Amazon MGM Studios), while the pre-May 1986 library was retained by Turner Entertainment Co., which eventually became part of the Warner Bros. Entertainment, Inc. entity, formed on December 3, 2002
  - United Artists
  - MGM/UA Television
- Motor Trend Group - sold to Hearst Communications in 2024
- National Kinney Corporation - spun-off in 1978 and renamed as Andal Corporation
- NBA TV (cable channel; operations) - lost rights on October 1, 2025
- NBA.com (joint venture with the NBA)
- New York Cosmos
- New Form Digital - Sold by Whistle in 2019
- Particular Crowd - spun-off in 2023.
- Panavision
- Picturehouse - renamed from Fine Line Features in 2005, then closed in 2008; reopened in 2013 as an independent studio
- Pittsburgh Pirates (48% with John W. Galbreath)
- Playdemic - sold to Electronic Arts in 2021
- PlayON! Sports Network
- Rooster Teeth - shut down in 2024; the remaining assets were sold to Box Canyon Productions in 2025
  - Rooster Teeth Animation
  - Rooster Teeth Studios
  - Rooster Teeth Games
- Studio Distribution Services - joint venture with Universal Pictures Home Entertainment; sold to Conectiv Supply Chain Solutions in 2026
- Sea World (Gold Coast) - 50% stake bought out by Village Roadshow Theme Parks in 2006 along with Wet 'N' Wild Gold Coast and Warner Bros Movie World.
- Six Flags - acquired by Premier Parks in 1998.
- SourceFed Studios - Sold to Group Nine Media, closed in 2017
- Seeker - Sold to Group Nine Media.
- The Burbank Studios - re-acquired by Worthe Real Estate Group, QuadReal Property Group and Stockbridge Capital Group in 2024
- The Smoking Gun
- SportSouth - acquired by Fox Cable Networks in 1996 and relaunched as Fox Sports South.
- TestTube - Sold by NowThis News renamed NowThis Originals
- Time Inc. - spun-off in 2014, then acquired by Meredith Corporation in 2018, and later acquired by IAC's Dotdash to form Dotdash Meredith in 2021, which became People Inc. four years later.
  - IPC Media
  - Time4 Media - formerly Times Mirror magazines group purchased from Tribune Company, sold to Bonnier Group & World Publications
    - Transworld Magazine Corporation
    - Popular Science
    - Marine Group
    - Time4Outdoors
    - Mountain Sports Media
  - The Parenting Group Inc. - Time, Inc. magazine group; sold to Bonnier and World Publications
    - Family Life - sold to Time Warner in 1999; closed down in 2001
- Time Life
  - Time-Life Films - sold to Columbia Pictures Television in 1981; library currently owned by HBO.
    - Talent Associates
  - Time–Life Records
- Time Warner Book Group - sold to Hachette Livre in 2006
- Time Warner Cable - spun-off in 2009 and has been acquired by Charter Communications in 2016.
- TMZ - sold to Fox Corporation in 2021.
- TT Centroid - moved to Pinewood Studios and spun off in 2008
- TriStar Pictures - joint venture with CBS and Columbia Pictures. HBO sold TriStar back to Columbia Pictures in December 1985.
- truTV UK and Ireland
- Turner South - acquired by Fox Cable Networks in 2006 and relaunched as SportSouth.
- TW Telecom - spun off in 1998, acquired by Level 3 Communications Inc. in 2014
- UKTV - joint venture with BBC Studios. Discovery Inc. sold its stake in 2019
- Uninterrupted - Sold to SpringHill Company
- USA Network (joint-venture with Gulf + Western Communications and MCA Inc.) – Stake sold back and dropped in 1987.
- Warner-Amex Satellite Entertainment - joint venture with American Express; became MTV Networks and sold to Viacom in 1986
  - Cable Music Channel - sold by Turner to Warner-Amex, then closed down and replaced with VH1
  - Nickelodeon
  - MTV
  - Bravo (joint venture with Rainbow Media Holdings) - Sold to Rainbow Media in 1984, Then got sold to NBC (now NBCUniversal) in 2002. Note that other NBCUniversal channels were moved to Versant as of 2026.
- Warner Bros. Discovery New Zealand - sold to Sky (New Zealand) in 2025
  - Bravo (joint venture with Comcast)
  - Eden
  - Three
  - Living
  - Rush
- Warner Bros. Movie World Gold Coast - 50% stake in the park bought out by Village Roadshow Theme Parks in 2006 along with Wet 'n' Wild Gold Coast and Sea World.
- Warner Bros. Movie World Germany
- Warner Bros. Ranch - sold to Stockbridge Capital Group
- Warner Music Group - spun-off in 2004, then acquired by Access Industries in 2011, and later spun-off again into an IPO in 2020
  - Warner Advanced Media Operations - acquired by Cinram International in 2003
  - WEA Manufacturing - acquired by Cinram International in 2003
- Wet'n'Wild Water World - 50% in the park bought out by Village Roadshow Theme Parks in 2006 along with Warner Bros. Movie World and Sea World.
- WPCH-TV - sold to Meredith Corporation in 2017 and later acquired by Gray Television in 2021.

== See also ==
- Lists of corporate assets
