= Home Box Office, Inc. =

American mass media company owned by Skydance

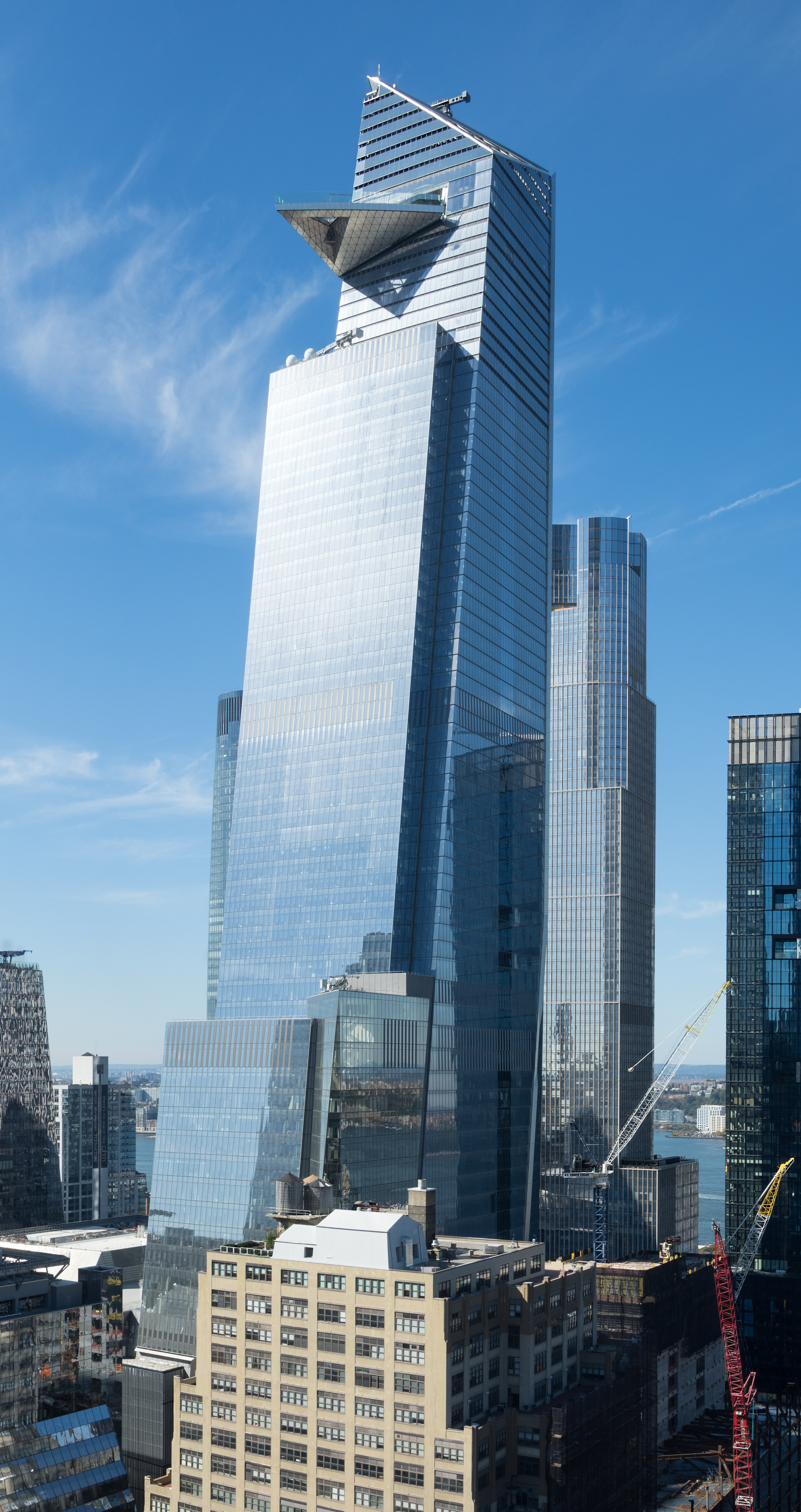
- Headquarters of HBO at 30 Hudson Yards, New York City
- Trade name: HBO Inc.
- Type: Subsidiary
- Industry: Entertainment
- Predecessor: Sterling Communications (1961–1973)
- Founded: February 28, 1973; 53 years ago
- Founder: Charles Dolan
- Defunct: October 6, 2026; 37 days ago
- Headquarters: 30 Hudson Yards, New York City, New York, United States
- Area served: Worldwide
- Key people: Glenn Whitehead (President and COO; HBO and Paramount+)
- Products: Pay television; Television production
- Brands: HBO; Cinemax; HBO Max
- Revenue: ▲US$5.890 billion (2016)
- Operating income: ▲US$1.928 billion (2016)
- Owner: Skydance
- Parent: Skydance Direct-to-Consumer
- Divisions: HBO Films; HBO Documentary Films; HBO Entertainment
- Subsidiaries: HBO Europe; HBO Asia

Home Box Office, Inc. (HBO) is an in name only American multinational media and entertainment company owned by Skydance. Founded on February 28, 1973, by Charles Dolan and based out of WarnerMedia's former corporate headquarters at the 30 Hudson Yards complex in the West Side of Manhattan, it primarily serves as a copyright and holding contract entity for HBO, Cinemax, and HBO Films. Before October 6, 2026, its main properties included its namesake pay television network, Home Box Office (HBO), sister service Cinemax, HBO Films, and the former HBO Go streaming service. Their secondary HBO-branded service, HBO Max, is operated under sister subsidiary Skydance Direct-to-Consumer, which shares principal management with Home Box Office, Inc. It also licensed and maintained ownership interests in international versions of HBO and Cinemax, most of which are managed by Home Box Office, Inc.

The company achieved several pioneering innovations in the cable television industry, including its satellite uplink of HBO as the first television network in the world to transmit through that technology, and the development of original programming for pay television.

== History ==
=== Origins as Sterling Communications ===
HBO, Inc.'s origins trace to December 1, 1965, when Charles Dolan—who had already done pioneering work in the commercial use of cables—was granted a franchise permit by the New York City Council to build a cable television system encompassing the Lower Manhattan section of New York City (traversing southward from 79th Street on the Upper East Side to 86th Street on the Upper West Side). Along with Dolan, TelePrompTer Corporation (which was assigned most of Upper Manhattan) and CATV Enterprises Inc. (which was assigned part of the city's Upper West Side, extending north of the Harlem River, and The Bronx's Riverdale neighborhood) were also awarded cable franchise permits on that date. Dolan's maiden television venture was Teleguide, a closed-circuit television system started by his initial company, Sterling Movies U.S.A., in June 1962; it distributed a schedule of tourist information, news, interview segments and feature interstitials to hotels, and by 1964, apartment buildings and office buildings in the New York metropolitan area.

Through Dolan's Sterling Information Services subsidiary, Manhattan Cable TV Services began limited cable service in September 1966. Manhattan Cable (renamed Sterling Manhattan Cable Television in January 1971) was the first urban underground cable television system to operate in the United States. Rather than string up cable on telephone poles or use microwave antennas to receive the signals, Sterling had laid new cable lines beneath the streets of and into buildings throughout Manhattan, and repurposed Teleguide's existing cable infrastructure for use by the new operation. Sterling's use of underground cables complied with a longstanding New York City Council ordinance—originally implemented to prevent broad-scale telephone and telegraph outages, after a severe blizzard affecting the Northeastern United States in March 1888 had caused widespread damage to above-ground utility lines in the area—requiring all electrical and telecommunication wiring to be laid underground to limit weather-related service disruptions, and because the multitude of tall buildings on Manhattan Island subjected television signals to reception impairments. Dolan curried the financial backing of Time-Life, Inc. (then the book publishing unit of Time Inc.), resulting in Manhattan Cable becoming one of its first cable system properties. Despite the investments from Time-Life's share of Sterling (initially 20% at the beginning of operations), Sterling Manhattan consistently lost money throughout its first six years of operation; the company incurred much of its debt from underground wiring expenses (costing as much as $300,000 per mile), and its difficulties attracting new subscribers to generate income (Manhattan Cable managed to receive only around 400 customers by 1967). On August 27, 1969, Sterling Communications consolidated ownership of the cable assets: it acquired Time-Life's 49% share in Sterling Manhattan, in exchange for stock and other assets worth $1.84 million. (Time-Life's interest in Sterling Communications concurrently increased from 25% to 44.5%.)

Dolan was looking for a way to help his struggling cable company grow to become financially viable. In the summer of 1971, during a family vacation to France aboard the Queen Elizabeth 2, Dolan conceived "The Green Channel", a codenamed concept for a cable-originated television channel that would be distributed via Sterling Manhattan and other participating cable systems. The proposed service would offer unedited theatrical movies licensed from the major Hollywood film studios and live sporting events, all presented without interruptions by advertising and sold for a flat monthly fee to prospective subscribers. Dolan wanted to offset the service's start-up costs by having Sterling enter into carriage agreements with other cable television providers to transmit and sell the service to their customers, and draw revenue from fees charged to subscribers who added the channel onto their existing cable service (which then consisted exclusively of local and imported broadcast stations). Dolan later presented his idea to management at Time-Life, who, despite the potential benefit to the company's cable assets, were initially hesitant to consider the "Green Channel" proposal. In the early 1970s, the cable television industry was not very profitable, and was under constant scrutiny from FCC regulators and the major broadcast television networks (CBS, NBC and ABC), who saw cable as a threat to their viability. Attempts to launch pay television services had been done on an experimental basis in the United States dating to 1951 (among them, Phonevision in New York City, Chicago and Hartford; SubscriberVision in New York City; Telemeter in Palm Springs, California; and Telemovies in Bartlesville, Oklahoma) with little to no success, muzzled by campaigns backed by movie theater chains and commercial broadcasters meant to alarm television viewers to the supposed threat of pay television to the movie industry and free-to-air television access, limited user interest, and FCC restrictions on the types of programming that could be offered to subscription services. Undeterred, Dolan managed to persuade Time-Life to assist him in backing the project.

After the Federal Communications Commission ruled that local governments could not restrict the operation of subscription television services in cable franchise terms, in July 1971, Sterling Communications—now consisting of Sterling Manhattan; its Long Island-based sister system, Sterling Nassau Cable Television; production firm Allegro Films; and direct-to-cable programming firm Television Presentations Inc.—informed the FCC that it planned to operate a cable-originated pay television service. Because Sterling's New York City Council franchise grant specifically required FCC approval for that purpose, Time/Sterling filed an FCC request to authorize pay television operations. Sterling indicated that a subscription television operation would also help Sterling Manhattan fund its fledgling local origination channel, which had incurred $1 million in start-up debt on top of annual company operating losses of $250,000. On September 10, 1971, the FCC gave preemptive authorization to Time-Life and Sterling Manhattan Cable to begin a pay television operation. On November 2, 1971, Time Inc.'s board of directors approved the "Green Channel" proposal, agreeing to give Dolan a $150,000 development grant for the project.

=== Early history; dissolution of Sterling ===
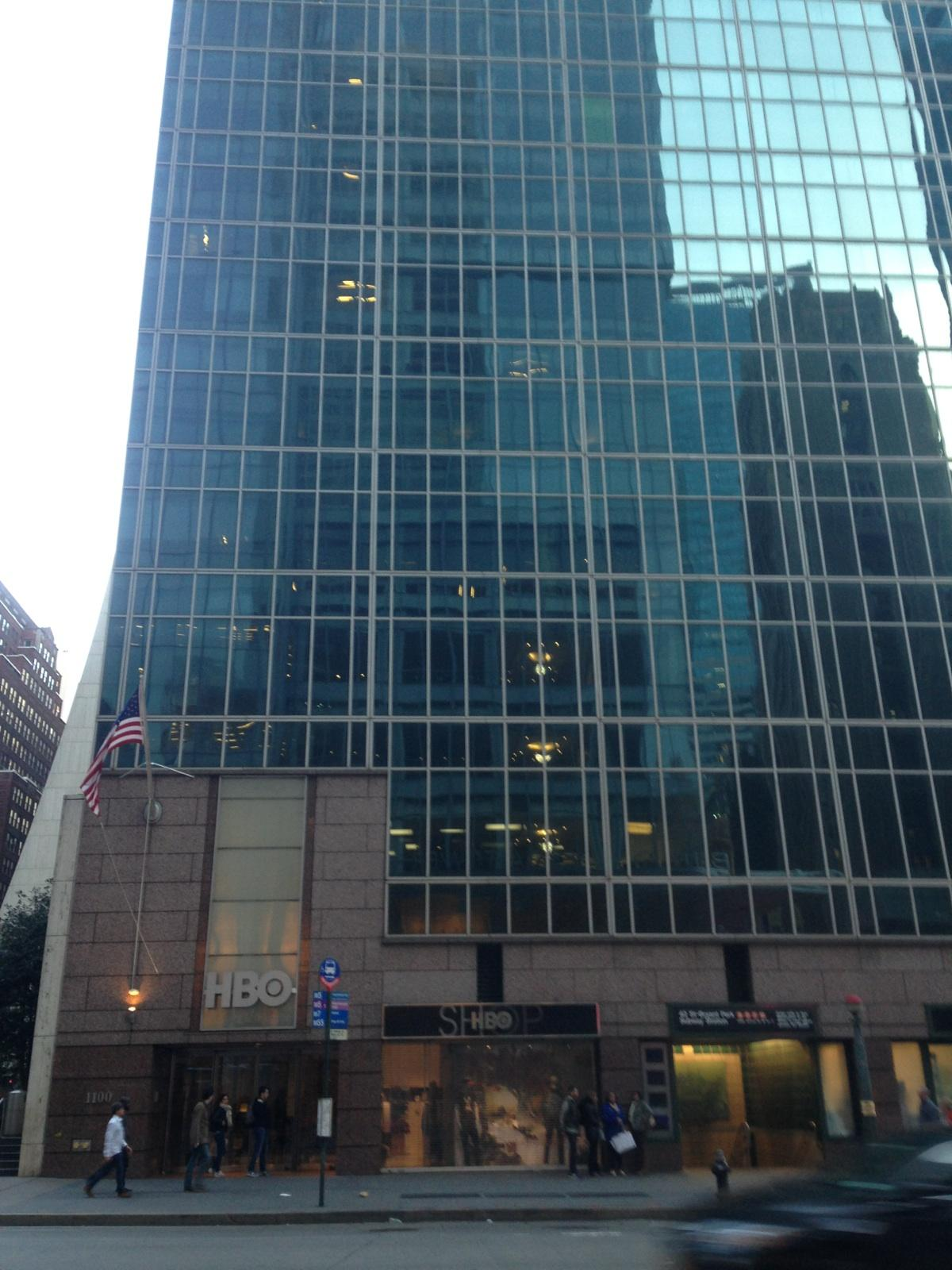
The entrance to the former HBO headquarters at 1100 Sixth Avenue in Midtown Manhattan

The namesake Home Box Office (HBO) pay television network was founded by Dolan—as a joint venture between Sterling Communications and its co-partner, Time Life Broadcasting Inc.—in 1972. The service—originally to have been called the "Sterling Cable Network", before Dolan and his development team settled on naming it "Home Box Office", originally intended as a placeholder name to meet publishing deadlines for the service's announcement memorandum and research brochures—launched on November 8, 1972, over Teleservice Cable (now Service Electric)'s Wilkes-Barre, Pennsylvania, system. Time Life originally planned for HBO to debut on a Teleservice system in Allentown, but, per an agreement with Teleservice president John Walson, moved the launch system to the company's Wilkes-Barre system to avoid blackouts of NBA games (specifically those featuring the Philadelphia 76ers, with which HBO was unable to materialize a television agreement to accompany its planned broadcasts of New York Knicks games) that were scheduled to air on the service. Programming on HBO initially consisted of theatrical films and event programming (much of which was sourced to the service through an agreement with Madison Square Garden that dated to 1969, and was extended to allow regional broadcasts one week before HBO launched), arranged in the form of a double feature, or a single movie presentation paired with either a sports or special event (often bridged by a short film or other interstitial content); by 1974, when the service began offering programming during the l concert specials and other music programs, daytime children's programs and various instructional series were added to the schedule. Originally headquartered from the Time-Life Building on Avenue of the Americas (Sixth Avenue) in Midtown Manhattan, HBO initially relayed its programming via a network of microwave relay towers throughout the Northeastern United States to participating cable systems carrying the channel;

On February 28, 1973, Sterling Communications announced it would spin-out HBO and associated assets into Home Box Office, Inc., a new subsidiary created in accordance with the sale of 9% of Sterling's HBO equity to Time Inc. (expanding its controlling shares to around 75% of HBO's equity) and a $3-million direct investment. Sterling also raised Time's equity in the company to 66.4% in exchange for the added HBO stake, through the purchase of additional stock and a converted $6.4-million note obligation. Dolan—who reportedly had major disagreements with Time-Life management on policy issues, claims which the company denied—subsequently resigned as chief executive officer of Sterling Communications and Home Box Office, accepting a $675,000 buyout of a portion of his stock while remaining on the board of directors at both companies in the interim; Dolan used portions of the sale's proceeds to repurchase Time's share of the Sterling Nassau systems and to start the Long Island Cable Community Development Co. (the forerunner to Cablevision Systems Corporation, that would be combined with the Sterling/Cablevision systems on Long Island) as the system's parent company. Gerald M. Levin—an entertainment industry attorney previously with New York City-based law firm Simpson Thacher & Bartlett, who had been with Home Box Office since it began operations as its director of finance, and later as its vice president and director of programming—replaced Dolan as the company's president and CEO; by September, he was joined by Time Life vice president J. Richard Munro as chairman of Home Box Office as well as Time-Life Broadcast's other subsidiaries, Manhattan Cable Television and NBC affiliate WOTV (now WOOD-TV) in Grand Rapids, Michigan (which became the company's lone conventional broadcasting property, after Time sold its other broadcast television properties as it began expanding into cable system ownership).

On May 9, 1973, reportedly because of high start-up and operating costs for HBO and other Sterling cable assets, Time announced it would sell its controlling share of Sterling to Warner Communications for $20 million. Time intended to convert the 260,000 convertible notes it held in Warner's cable television unit, Warner Cable Communications, into common stock shares totaling up to 20% in interest. Sterling would then maintain oversight of Home Box Office under Warner's purview. The Time-Warner cable deal was terminated on June 27, after both companies failed to reach a definitive agreement to sell HBO and the other Sterling subsidiaries to Warner; financial arrangements made between Sterling and the New York City Council as part of their 20-year noncompete franchise agreement were alleged to have curtailed the sale.

On July 19, 1973, Time Inc. reached an agreement to purchase and assume financial liabilities of Sterling Communications for $6.2 million (including $3.1‐million in redeemed public debentures). Time completed its acquisition of Sterling on September 18, 1973, formally dissolving the Sterling holding company and transferring Home Box Office and Sterling Manhattan Cable to its Time-Life division. The "Sterling" name was subsequently removed from the Manhattan and Long Island systems, with the Manhattan unit being renamed "Manhattan Cable Television". (Time's purchase of Sterling was the subject of a $97-million class action lawsuit filed in the U.S. District Court for the Southern District of New York on November 28, 1973, by 15 former Sterling stockholders who accused Time and its corporate board of "conspiracy" to depress the value of Sterling stock in order to "force" the sale at below market value "far less than its true value.") As the acquisition was being completed, the service had struggled to grow to complete viability: by October, it had around 8,000 subscribers and was carried on 13 cable systems in Pennsylvania and southern New York State with a combined 110,095 subscribers, and it was suffering from a significant churn rate as subscribers who found the channel's program scheduling repetitive, because of the limited allotment of movies outside of special events, decided to cancel their service.

On April 11, 1975, Levin and Time-Life unveiled plans to distribute the HBO signal via satellite under a transponder leasing agreement with RCA Americom Communications, intending to distribute its programming to cable systems and multipoint distribution services throughout the United States. Levin reached an agreement to distribute the HBO satellite feed on eight UA-Columbia Cablevision systems in California, Texas, Florida, Arizona, Arkansas and Washington State, and build earth station receivers to intercept and relay the signal to the UA-Columbia systems' headends. HBO also signed a $7.5-million agreement (including $6.5 million allocated by Levin) with RCA Americom to lease a transponder on the then-under construction Satcom I, which was expected to be launched at the end of 1975, for a five-year term. Cable television equipment manufacturer Scientific Atlanta (through a client arrangement with Transcommunications Corp.) also intended to build earth-based satellite transmitting stations for setup outside of HBO's Manhattan headquarters and at the headend sites of the client cable systems that reached agreements to receive the signal ahead of the satellite launch.

HBO began continuously transmitting via satellite on September 30, 1975, for the broadcast of the "Thrilla in Manila" heavyweight championship boxing match between Muhammad Ali and Joe Frazier from the Araneta Coliseum in Cubao, Philippines. The broadcast that marked the television industry innovation was received by UA-Columbia Cablevision's Fort Pierce and Vero Beach, Florida, systems, and American Television and Communications Corporation's Jackson, Mississippi system, alongside systems already receiving HBO via microwave beforehand in the northeastern U.S. The service temporarily retransmitted its signal from transponder on Westar 1 for the first three months of satellite transmissions, before switching to Satcom I when that satellite commenced commercial operations on February 1, 1976. It also gradually turned around the fortunes of HBO: at the time Time-Life, Inc. bought the remaining interest of the channel in September 1973, HBO's subscribership amassed only 8,000 customers across 14 Pennsylvania cable systems and was hampered by significant churn rate as some subscribers cancelled their service because of the repetitive scheduling of programming. By 1980, HBO was carried on cable and MMDS providers in all 50 U.S. states, with more than three million subscribers nationwide. Other cable channels followed HBO's footsteps in satellite distribution; in December 1976, Atlanta independent station WTCG-TV—now WBD-owned basic cable service TBS, and owned by Ted Turner at the time it went national—became the first television broadcaster to transmit via satellite as a basic cable service, pioneering the "superstation" concept (non-network-affiliated television stations that transmit on a regional or national basis primarily through cable). This, along with the CBN Satellite Service (now Freeform) launching by satellite in April 1977—pioneered the development of basic cable, using HBO's blueprint of utilizing satellite delivery for the cable television industry. In May 1976, Gerald Levin was promoted to chairman and CEO of Home Box Office Inc., succeeded as company president by Manhattan Cable president Nicholas "N.J." Nicholas Jr.

==== Home Box Office v. FCC; acquisition of Telemation ====
The ability of Home Box Office and other pay television services to offer a wide array of content was challenged on March 20, 1975, when the Federal Communications Commission (FCC) updated its pay-cable regulations to modify anti-siphoning regulations that further limited the operations of HBO and other movie- and sports-based cable services (including local and regional subscription television operations). Under the regulations, cable-originated services could not devote more than 90% of their programming schedule to theatrical motion pictures and sporting events, and could not broadcast movies released within three years of their initial theatrical exhibition. Specific sporting events (such as annual tournaments) could not be "siphoned off" by cable services if such events had been televised on broadcast television within the past five years, and regular season games involving major sports leagues was limited to allow a proportion of games to continue to be shown on broadcast television or else cable programmers would be required to limit their sports programming proportionately should over-the-air sports telecasts decline. On November 3, Home Box Office Inc., Manhattan Cable Television, five other cable television system operators (American Television and Communications Corp., Viacode, UA-Columbia Cablevision, Warner Cable Communications and TelePrompTer Corp.) and competing pay-cable programming operator Theatrevision filed a joint appeal to the U.S. Court of Appeals for the District of Columbia Circuit, alleging the rules violated antitrust statues by inhibiting competition, exceeded FCC authority and violated cable programmers' First Amendment rights by regulating their access to content. (Network executives, National Association of Broadcasters officials and other broadcast industry representatives also were critical of the rules as administrative record did not support FCC allegations of content "siphoning" by cable-originated services. NBC and ABC, however, requested re-consideration of an increase to the minimum period of exclusive broadcast exhibition of movies from two years to three.) Earlier in 1975, the film exhibition rules prevented HBO from licensing two 20th Century Fox films released well outside the two-year window, Butch Cassidy and the Sundance Kid (1969) and The Sound of Music (1965).

Though rules for movies and sports were tightened, the FCC conversely drafted relaxed rules limiting pay television services from airing a television series unless it has had no prior conventional television broadcast, suggesting allowing pay services to carry series not purchased by broadcast outlets, under contract to a local station in any media market, not shown on broadcast television for at least three years or with 50 episodes or less to be available for pay syndication. However, cable programmers and the Motion Picture Association of America petitioned for the rules to be eliminated. The initial joint appeal and a separate objections by the U.S. Department of Justice and Metromedia were consolidated by the Court of Appeals into Home Box Office v. Federal Communications Commission.

On June 24, 1976, Home Box Office Inc. reached an in-principle agreement to purchase Telemation Program Services, a supplier of programming from individual program distributors to pay-cable systems. HBO sought Telemation to extend the channel's distribution to the 180,000 subscribers (across 40 cable systems) to which the company provided content distribution; theoretically, this would allow Telemation to accommodate a custom feed of HBO to a system owner that declined to offer the service (such as for objections to carry R-rated movies). (Telemation later merged with a separate program marketing unit formed in April 1979, HBO Program Services, in 1980.)

On March 29, 1977, the District of Columbia Appeals Court ruled in favor of the plaintiffs in Home Box Office v. FCC, overturning cable television anti-siphoning rules. (Similar rules applying to over-the-air pay television were affirmed in the ruling.) The 105-page decision held that the FCC trespassed on the First Amendment rights of cable operators, pointing that cable bandwidth was not a scarce resource and therefore, was not subject to limitations affirmed in the Supreme Court's 1969 Red Lion Broadcasting Co. v. FCC ruling (which upheld equal time provisions in the Fairness Doctrine). The court applied the O'Brien test (determining the FCC had failed two of its four "prongs" or standards) and found that the degree of limitation of free speech imposed by the FCC was inadequate, "grossly overboard" and thereby "arbitrary, capricious and unconstitutional" to the rights of pay-cable telecasters. The decision gave free rein for Home Box Office and other pay cable services to acquire movie and sports rights without restriction, opening the door for services like HBO to engage in library content agreements for older films and, more broadly, the ability of cable-originated services to acquire a broad spectrum of sporting events (albeit with league-determined protections to ensure events are distributed on both broadcast and cable networks). A subsequent appeal decision by the U.S. Supreme Court on October 3, 1977, affirmed the ruling by refusing to review the District of Columbia Appeals Court's overturning of the pay-cable rules.

=== Early expansion; challenges to indecency statutes ===
As the HBO television service was growing nationally, Time-Life tried to develop companion pay services to sell to prospective subscribers, including existing HBO customers. Home Box Office's first attempt at a secondary service was Take 2, a movie channel marketed at a family audience that launched in April 1979. The "mini-pay" service (a smaller-scale pay television channel sold at a discounted rate) tried to cater to cable subscribers reluctant to subscribe to HBO because of its cost and potentially objectionable content in some programs. Take 2, however, was hampered by a slow subscriber and carriage growth, forcing Time-Life to shut down the channel in January 1981.

HBO executives then decided to develop a lower-cost "maxi-pay" service: on May 18, 1980, Home Box Office Inc. announced during that year's National Cable Television Association Convention its plans to launch Cinemax, a companion movie channel designed as a direct competitor to The Movie Channel (then owned by Warner-Amex Satellite Entertainment, part-owned by Warner Bros. Discovery predecessor Warner Communications) initially focused on movies chosen for their appeal to select audience demographics. Cinemax was designed to complement HBO (designated as a higher-tier "foundation [premium] service"), and avoid difficulties associated with bundling multiple "foundation" pay services. Cinemax launched over 56 cable systems in the Eastern and Central Time Zones on August 1, 1980. (A West Coast feed for the Pacific and Mountain Time Zones launched on September 1.) Compared to Take 2, Cinemax experienced far greater success because it relied on classic feature films from the 1930s to the 1970s, mixed with some more recent films, incidentally benefiting from the limited headend channel capacity offered by cable systems and customer demand for uncut broadcasts of theatrical movies. HBO traditionally marketed Cinemax to cable operators for sale to subscribers as part of a singular premium bundle with HBO, available at a discount if electing to subscribe to both channels. As Cinemax evolved, it expanded into non-film programming content, including music specials, some limited original and acquired programming (such as SCTV Channel and Max Headroom) and, most notably, late-night softcore pornographic films and series; the adult programming—initially offered as part of the "Friday After Dark" block, eventually expanding to all seven nights by the start of the 1990s—became a key draw for Cinemax subscribers, and the main association with the channel in pop culture. Pornographic adult programming on began to be de-emphasized from the linear Cinemax and HBO Zone channels' late-night programming in 2011, as part of the former's refocusing toward its mainstream feature films and a then-emerging slate of original action series, and was removed entirely from Home Box Office's linear and on-demand platforms in 2018.

The 1980s also saw HBO join three separate lawsuits concerning municipal and state-level statutes that would have legally prohibited cable systems from transmitting "indecent" content—specifically, programs that featured descriptions of or depicted "illicit" sexual acts and/or nudity—which Home Box Office Inc. and cable systems that challenged the laws saw as overbroad and in violation of the First Amendment, and would have precluded HBO and other pay television networks from airing programs containing material that may be considered inappropriate. Two of these involved statutes in Utah: HBO and four Utah cable systems sought a permanent injunction to a 1981 statute passed by the Utah State Legislature to restrict indecent cable program content, which was granted by Judge Bruce S. Jenkins of the U.S. District Court for the District of Utah on November 17, 1981; the statute was declared unconstitutional as a violation of the First and Fourteenth Amendments in a separate ruling by Jenkins on January 13, 1982. A second attempt at addressing obscene cable programming, the Cable Television Programming Decency Act, was declared unconstitutional on First Amendment grounds by Utah District Court Senior District Judge Aldon J. Anderson on April 10, 1985, in a case filed by HBO, Community Television of Utah and several viewer groups; a modified form of the statute was ruled as a violation of the First Amendment by the Eleventh Circuit Court of Appeals on September 10, 1985, and affirmed as unconstitutional by the U.S. Supreme Court on March 23, 1987, formally asserting that the subscriber-based model of cable television precluded programming content from being regulated in the same manner as broadcast television. A separate city ordinance in Miami that would have allowed the revocation of Miami Cablevision (now operated by Comcast)'s franchise license for carrying programs that the city manager deemed "obscene or indecent" was struck down by Judge William Hoeveler of the U.S. District Court for the Southern District of Florida on August 3, 1983, on the grounds outlined in Jenkins' ruling, and affirmed by the U.S. Court of Appeals for the Eleventh Circuit on April 10, 1985.

On September 27, 1984, Home Box Office Inc. announced it would acquire a 15% equity share in Black Entertainment Television (BET), which would be accumulated under a "contribution" arrangement in which BET will stop paying a monthly lease to the transponder that HBO had then leased to BET until the accumulated lease amount matches what the latter would have paid fellow minority shareholders Taft Television & Radio Company and Tele-Communications Inc. BET repurchased all of Time Warner's stock in April 1996 in a $58-million transaction. In 1985, the operations of Home Box Office Inc. were relocated to facilities on West 42nd Street and Sixth Avenue in the Bryant Park district of Midtown Manhattan.

=== Home video, production and television ventures ===
==== Film and television production ====
HBO Entertainment
- Type: Division
- Industry: Television production
- Founded: 1983; 43 years ago
- Headquarters: 30 Hudson Yards, New York City, New York, United States
- Products: Miniseries, television programs
- Parent: Home Box Office, Inc.

Home Box Office, Inc. began diversifying its portfolio beyond cable television during the 1980s. In 1982, HBO entered into a joint venture with Columbia Pictures and CBS Theatrical Films to form Tri-Star Pictures (the hyphen in the name was removed in 1991); the new studio was created as a means for the three entities to pool resources to split the ever-growing costs of making feature films. The studio's first production, Robert Redford-led The Natural, was released in 1984. Tri-Star entered into the television production business, in April 1987, with the formation of Tri-Star Television. Towards the second half of the decade, the partnership transitioned into a singularly owned entity: CBS sold its ownership stake in the studio in November 1985, followed by HBO/Time Inc. in December 1985. HBO transferred its venture shares to Columbia Pictures, which integrated Columbia and Tri-Star into the umbrella company Columbia Pictures Entertainment. (As of 2020, TriStar operates exclusively as a film production arm of Sony Pictures Entertainment. Its television unit was merged with Columbia Pictures Television and joint venture studio Columbia TriStar Television in 2002 to form Sony Pictures Television).

Film production for the HBO television service commenced in 1983, through the formation of HBO Premiere Films, which was originally developed to produce original made-for-cable movies and miniseries with higher budgets and production values compared to other television films. The film division began producing original movies for the network in 1983 with the debut of The Terry Fox Story, a biographical film on the amputee runner who embarked on a cross-country run across his home country of Canada that was cut short by the advanced-stage osteosarcoma that ended his life through associated complications soon afterward. Differing from most television films produced for cable television, most of the original movies produced by HBO have featured major film actors over the years, ranging from James Stewart to Michael Douglas. The unit—which would be rechristened HBO Pictures in 1986—expanded beyond its telefilm slate, which was scaled back, and soon ventured into independent film production. In 1985, HBO made a co-financing agreement with Orion Pictures in order to finance Three Amigos!, in order to receive half of the film's planned budget. When HBO Pictures was formed, HBO entered into a limited partnership with Thorn EMI to form Silver Screen Partners. The first L.P. of its kind to be developed for the financing of feature film production, Silver Screen released only seven films between 1983 and 1986. Most of these were not commercial or critical successes, with the minor exception of the 1985 comedy film Volunteers. HBO next made its move by financing theatrical motion pictures produced by Taft Entertainment Pictures and Keith Barish Productions in 1984 on behalf of Tri-Star Pictures, Vestron Video, J&M Entertainment (formerly the role was held by Producers Sales Organization) and other financers, but The Running Man is the only major hit the company had.

HBO was also invested in 1987 by financing pictures from production companies like Aaron Russo Entertainment, who co-produced Rude Awakening, Off and Running and Missing Pieces for Orion Pictures, Viacom, Cineplex Odeon Films and The Rank Organization, between 1989 and 1991 (only one came out in the United States, the other two went direct-to-video since Orion Pictures went bankrupt), and another in 1987 from the film production company Mercury/Douglas Films, who produced Mom and Dad Save the World and Don't Tell Mom the Babysitter's Dead, on behalf of MGM (whose duties later transferred to Warner Bros.).

A secondary internal film production unit, HBO Showcase, was created in 1986 to focus primarily on high-quality drama productions. One of its productions, 1989's Age Old Friends, became the unit's first film to earn Primetime Emmy Awards, respectively for Outstanding Lead Actor in a Miniseries or Movie (Hume Cronyn) and Outstanding Supporting Actor in a Miniseries or Movie (Vincent Gardenia). In January 1996, HBO Showcase was superseded by HBO NYC Productions, a New York-based studio focusing primarily on HBO original movies as well as occasional drama series productions for the network. Time Warner consolidated HBO Pictures and HBO NYC Productions into a singular unit, HBO Films, in October 1999. Since then, the division has expanded into theatrical film productions distributed by sister company Warner Bros. Pictures and its subsidiaries, in addition to continuing to produce HBO's slate of original movies. In 1988, HBO entered into another limited partnership to create Cinema Plus L.P. The studios' most notable film was Ricochet (a co-production with Silver Pictures); other titles produced throughout Cinema Plus' existence included Mom and Dad Save the World, Switch and Don't Tell Mom the Babysitter's Dead. All of the films—none of which were critical or commercial successes—were released between 1991 and 1992, and were distributed theatrically by HBO sister company Warner Bros. Pictures (its duties was intended to be held by MGM until the Time Inc.-Warner Communications merger).

Home Box Office, Inc. entered into television production outside of the flagship HBO channel in 1988, with the formation of HBO Downtown Productions, which the unit was named in 1991 after The Comedy Channel got dissolved in favor of CTV: The Comedy Network (later Comedy Central). In addition to handling the production of comedy specials for HBO, the channel produced program content for Comedy Central (such as Politically Incorrect with Bill Maher and Dr. Katz, Professional Therapist). A secondary television production unit, HBO Independent Productions (HIP), was formed in September 1990. The Los Angeles-based production company specialized in television series and specials for broadcast, cable and syndicated television as well as lower-budget theatrical films. Throughout its 16-year existence, HIP primarily produced sitcoms for broadcast television and basic cable networks (including Martin, Roc, The Ben Stiller Show and Everybody Loves Raymond).

==== Home video ====
HBO Home Entertainment
- Formerly: Thorn EMI Video (1980–1985); Thorn EMI/HBO Video (1985–1986); HBO/Cannon Video (1986–1987); HBO Video (1987–1993; 2003–2009); HBO Home Video/HBO Savoy Home Video (1994–2003)
- Type: Division
- Industry: Home entertainment
- Founded: 1980; 46 years ago
- Defunct: 2020; 6 years ago
- Fate: Transferred to Warner Bros. Home Entertainment in 2019
- Headquarters: United States
- Products: Home video releases
- Services: Home video Digital distribution
- Parent: Thorn EMI (1980–1986); The Cannon Group (1986–1987); Time Inc. (1985–1990); WarnerMedia (1990–2019)

During the early 1980s, HBO had an agreement with Vestron Video to distribute some of HBO's made-for-cable films and specials (such as The Terry Fox Story); Vestron had been created by former HBO executive Austin Furst, who had been assigned to dismantle the assets of Time-Life Films.

On February 21, 1984, as the broader entertainment industry began to drop their objections to and begin releasing their films through the then-burgeoning home video marketplace, HBO announced plans to launch a home video unit, and began conversations with executives at both Vestron and Thorn EMI Video, in hopes that a joint venture between the network and at least one of the two video distributors could be established. HBO ultimately selected Thorn EMI, and that November, Thorn EMI/HBO Video was formed to distribute Thorn EMI's existing selection of product, plus HBO-produced programming. Thorn EMI's strategy at the time was to supplement the modest output of Thorn EMI's Screen Entertainment division, by way of signing distribution agreements with various mid-level and independent film production companies (such as Orion Pictures and New Line Cinema, as well as British television station Thames Television) that did not have their own home video units.

In August 1986, Cannon Films acquired Thorn EMI's interest in Thorn EMI/HBO Video, inherited from Thorn EMI Screen Entertainment, which Time Inc. subsequently renamed HBO/Cannon Video. Under Cannon's part-ownership, the strategy established by Thorn EMI continued; HBO/Cannon struck deals with Kings Road Entertainment, fellow Time, Inc. property Sports Illustrated, and De Laurentiis Entertainment Group for video rights to theatrical films (and, in SI's case, direct-to-video product). Ironically, however, very few Cannon films were released by HBO/Cannon, due in part to other deals Cannon had previously made with MGM/UA Home Video and Media Home Entertainment.

HBO/Cannon also ran into issues with Cannon's rival Carolco Pictures; when the latter company, who had previously released certain titles via Thorn EMI/HBO, acquired a major stake in rival independent video company International Video Entertainment, HBO/Cannon paid $43 million to return two films, Angel Heart and Extreme Prejudice, to Carolco, which then relicensed the home video rights to IVE. Additional issues arose when multiple Cannon titles intended for release through HBO/Cannon, such as Masters of the Universe and Surrender, were bought back by Cannon, which then re-licensed them to Warner Home Video, as part of a $75 million agreement it made using loans funded by financer Alan Bond.

HBO acquired Cannon's interest in the venture in April 1987, amid financial losses incurred by the film studio after an unsuccessful attempt at releasing a series of larger budget films that floundered in box office revenue; the unit was subsequently renamed HBO Video. HBO began taking action to ensure that their video arm would continue to have fresh product, such as an eight film co-production deal with ITC Entertainment, which gave HBO all pay cable and video rights (while ITC retained all foreign and free-to-air TV rights to the films), and promotional deals designed to push rental releases. Also that year, the company entered into a deal to distribute on video two popular Hemdale Film Corporation titles from 1986, Hoosiers and Platoon. The company was subsequently sued by Vestron Video for allegedly breaching an existing contract that the firm had with Hemdale regarding those films; a judge eventually ordered HBO to recall all rental video cassettes of Hoosiers that had been on the market since September 1987. A settlement was ultimately reached that allowed HBO to offer video cassettes of the contested films for the first half of 1988, after which the rights reverted to Vestron.

Over time, HBO Video—which eventually became HBO Home Video in January 1994—shifted focus away from releasing films from independent studios to releasing HBO's catalog of original programs and films on DVD and Blu-ray Disc. In addition, HBO Video also entered into various licensing deals with distributors such as Congress Video, Goodtimes Home Video, and Video Treasures to distribute and re-issue HBO's content catalogs. The unit—renamed HBO Home Entertainment on September 5, 2009—eventually transferred the manufacturing of physical products to Warner Home Video, and by 2020 had fully merged into Warner Bros. Home Entertainment.

==== Expansion of television service ====
On April 1, 1986, HBO commenced test-marketing of a new mini-pay service, Festival, to six American Television and Communications Corporation systems. Festival was targeted at older cable subscribers who objected to violent and sexual content on other pay cable services, non-cable television viewers, and basic cable subscribers that had no existing premium service subscription. Festival ceased operations on December 31, 1988; HBO cited headend channel capacity limitations for the closure, as it prevented Festival from expanding its distribution.

On January 2, 1989, Selecciones en Español de HBO y Cinemax ("Spanish Selections from HBO and Cinemax"), a Spanish-language audio feed transmitted through, depending on the cable system affiliate, either an auxiliary second audio program channel (accessible through built-in and external multichannel audio decoders) or audio simulcasts via FM radio, launched. The service originally offered Spanish audio simulcasts of recent feature film releases from HBO and Cinemax's movie suppliers, and by Spring, added audio simulcasts of HBO's live boxing matches (except for certain events broadcast exclusively in Spanish on networks such as Galavisión). Selecciones was replaced by two dedicated Spanish feeds of the two services, HBO en Español and Cinemax en Español, on September 27, 1993; both channels acted as part-time simulcast feeds with added first-run Spanish-language movies (mostly from Mexico, Argentina and Spain), and Spanish dubs of HBO's non-sports-event original programming.

=== Time-Warner merger ===
On March 4, 1989, Warner Communications announced its intent to merge with Time Inc. for $14.9 billion in cash and stock. The merger underwent two unsuccessful efforts by Paramount Communications to block the merger via civil injunctions, wanting to thwart the Warner offer as Paramount was seeking to acquire Time in a hostile takeover bid. The Time Inc.-Warner Communications merger was completed on January 10, 1990, resulting in the consolidated entity becoming known as Time Warner. (Manhattan Cable Television would be integrated into Time Warner Cable—formed through a consolidation of the cable system assets of American Television and Communications [ATC], which Time acquired for $140 million in January 1978 and subsequently integrated with Manhattan Cable, and Warner Cable Communications—and would adopt its parent unit's identity in January 1993. Time Warner Cable would be spun-off from its namesake parent as an independent company in 2009, and later merged into Charter Communications in May 2016.) By the start of 1990, HBO served 17.3 million subscribers out of a cumulative 23.7 million subscribers covered between it and sister network Cinemax.

On November 15, 1989, Home Box Office, Inc. launched The Comedy Channel, a comedy-centered basic cable channel featuring clips excerpted from stand-up comedy sets, comedic feature films and television series. The Comedy Channel's programming model was similar to the original format of MTV (which, ironically, was launched under WBD's predecessor Warner Communications and American Express's media joint venture, Warner–Amex Satellite Entertainment). Its competitor was Viacom-owned Ha!: The TV Comedy Network, another startup comedy-oriented cable channel that was formally announced after The Comedy Channel and debuted on April 1, 1990, focusing on reruns of older network sitcoms. Both channels experienced difficulties gaining sufficient cable distribution (both Ha! and The Comedy Channel each had fewer than 10 million subscribers), and struggled to turn a profit, making them "prohibitively expensive" to operate independently.

On December 18, 1989, Viacom and HBO reached an agreement to consolidate Ha! and The Comedy Channel into a single channel, CTV: The Comedy Network, which launched on April 1, 1991; its name was subsequently changed to Comedy Central on June 1 of that year, in order to limit confusion and potential trademark issues with the Canadian-based CTV Television Network. Time Warner/HBO exited the venture in April 2003, when Viacom bought out its 50% stake in Comedy Central for $1.23 billion. (As of 2020, Comedy Central operates under the Media Networks unit of Paramount Global.)

On December 19, 1990, Home Box Office, Inc. announced the formation of TVKO (renamed HBO PPV in 2001 and HBO Boxing Pay-Per-View in 2013), a sports production unit—operated by Time Warner Sports, in conjunction with its HBO Sports unit—which distributed and organized marquee pay-per-view boxing events with the partnership of participating promoters. The announcement came as HBO secured an agreement with promoter Dan Duva to broadcast then-heavyweight champion Evander Holyfield's pay-cable and pay-per-view matches, which had been airing on Showtime since 1986. HBO announced it would fold HBO PPV on September 27, 2018, as part of the HBO television service's broader exit from boxing telecasts after 45 years, citing the influx of sports-based streaming services (such as DAZN and ESPN+) as well as other issues with promoters that hampered HBO's ability to acquire high-profile fight cards, declining ratings and loss of interest in the sport among HBO's subscribers, and the network's efforts to place more focus around its scripted programming in the aftermath of its acquisition by WarnerMedia.

In 1993, HBO purchased post-theatrical distribution rights for 48 films in development from upstart production company Savoy Pictures (co-founded by Victor A. Kaufman and Lewis J. Korman). Savoy Pictures never generated success with any of its feature film releases, and eventually folded in 1997. In 2005, HBO Films and New Line Cinema formed Picturehouse, a worldwide theatrical distribution company for high-quality independent films. The company, along with sister studio Warner Independent Pictures, was shut down in May 2008 as part of the consolidation of New Line with its sister unit Warner Bros. Entertainment. (Picturehouse CEO Bob Berney would later resurrect the studio as an independent entity in 2013, after purchasing the trademark rights from Time Warner.)

On March 1, 1994, a partnership between Home Box Office, Inc. and Showtime Networks (parent of HBO rivals Showtime and The Movie Channel) implemented a cooperative content advisory system that was initially unveiled across HBO, Cinemax and the Showtime Networks properties that would provide specific content information for pay-cable subscribers to determine the suitability of a program for children. The development of the system—inspired by the advisory ratings featured in HBO and Cinemax's respective program guides and those distributed by other participating premium cable services—was in response to concerns from parents and advocacy groups about violent content on television, allowing HBO and other services to assign individual ratings corresponding to the objectionable content depicted in specific programs (and categorized based on violence, profanity, sexuality or miscellaneous mature material). Labels are assigned to each program at the discretion of the participating service. A revised system—centered around ten content codes of two to three letters in length—was implemented across HBO and the other participating pay services on June 10, 1994.

On January 7, 1998, Time Warner announced it would immediately consolidate its C-band retail businesses, HBO Direct (a retail arm of HBO's direct-to-home operations that sold HBO, Cinemax and their respective multiplex packages as well as ancillary programming services) and Turner Home Satellite (THS) (which handled C-band, direct-broadcast satellite and hospitality distribution of the Turner Broadcasting System cable networks—including TBS Superstation, CNN, CNN Headline News, CNN International, TNT, Cartoon Network and Turner Classic Movies—and until the promotion's folding in 2001, World Championship Wrestling [WCW] pay-per-view events), into a singular retail unit under Home Box Office Inc.

On October 15, 2014, Home Box Office, Inc. announced it would launch an over-the-top (OTT) subscription streaming service in the United States in 2015, which would be marketed directly to cord cutters (consumers who primarily use streaming video services rather than watch television via a cable or satellite subscription) and competing with services such as Netflix. HBO Now formally launched on April 7, 2015, initially retailing only to Apple TV and iOS devices under a three-month exclusivity agreement. The service is similar to HBO Go, a TV Everywhere streaming platform that launched on February 18, 2010, and is marketed exclusively to existing HBO linear subscribers through a television provider. Under WarnerMedia stewardship, on October 10, 2018, the company announced plans for a new OTT platform combining programming from HBO with content from various other WarnerMedia properties, including Warner Bros. Pictures, Warner Bros. Television, and the WarnerMedia Entertainment- and Warner Bros. Entertainment-operated basic cable networks previously owned by the Turner Broadcasting System. The service—announced as HBO Max on July 9, 2019, and operating under WarnerMedia Direct, making it one of two HBO-branded properties (alongside HBO Home Entertainment) not to operate under the Home Box Office, Inc. umbrella—was developed under a separate infrastructure from HBO Go and HBO Now, and existing subscribers were offered to transfer subscriptions to HBO Max following its May 27, 2020 launch. Although the two existing platforms continue to be sold, WarnerMedia began phasing out HBO Now on participating digital platforms with the launch of HBO Max, which utilizes a similar design interface as HBO Now for its Apple and Android apps.

=== Acquisition by AT&T ===
On October 22, 2016, AT&T disclosed an offer to acquire Time Warner for $108.7 billion, including assumed debt held by the latter company. The merger would bring Time Warner's various media properties, including Home Box Office, Inc., under the same corporate umbrella as AT&T's telecommunications holdings, including satellite provider DirecTV and IPTV/broadband provider AT&T U-verse. Time Warner shareholders approved the merger on February 15, 2017. On November 20, 2017, the U.S. Department of Justice filed a lawsuit against AT&T and Time Warner in an attempt to block the merger, citing antitrust concerns surrounding the transaction. U.S. clearance of the proposed merger—which had already received approval from European, Mexican, Chilean and Brazilian regulatory authorities—was affirmed by court ruling on June 12, 2018, after District of Columbia U.S. District Court Judge Richard J. Leon ruled in favor of AT&T, and dismissed antitrust claims asserted in the DOJ's lawsuit. The merger closed two days later on June 14, 2018, with Time Warner becoming a wholly owned subsidiary of AT&T, which renamed the unit WarnerMedia. The U.S. Court of Appeals in Washington unanimously upheld the lower court's ruling in favor of AT&T on February 26, 2019. In August 2017, as part of their co-production deal with the studio, HBO and Sky acquired minority equity interests in British television production company Bad Wolf (producer of the HBO miniseries The Night Of).

On February 28, 2019, Richard Plepler stepped down from his position as CEO of Home Box Office, Inc., after a collective 27-year tenure at HBO and twelve years as head of the network and its parent unit. Plepler reportedly "found he had less autonomy after the merger," as Stankey felt Plepler was "attached to a fading distribution model" by selling HBO programming with other linear channels and to channel platforms operated by streaming distributors also involved in content development; Plepler had developed a plan to drive $7.5 billion in annual revenue by seeking greater content investment for HBO and Cinemax (including incorporating "family-friendly original, library, and licensed children's programming" onto Cinemax's schedule), an agreement to sell its TV Everywhere service HBO Go directly to Comcast's broadband-only customers, and to offer the HBO/Cinemax linear channel bundle for at a slightly higher price point than the standalone HBO service's average $14.99 monthly fee. Stankey, meanwhile, wanted to leverage HBO and the broader WarnerMedia content library to develop a viable streaming competitor to Netflix, which resulted in the development and May 2020 launch of HBO Max over HBO Go and HBO Now's existing technical infrastructure.

On March 4, 2019, AT&T announced a major reorganization of WarnerMedia's assets, dividing WarnerMedia's television properties among three corporate divisions. Home Box Office, Inc. (encompassing HBO, Cinemax, and their respective wholly owned international channels and streaming services) was reassigned to WarnerMedia Entertainment, placing it under the same umbrella as sister basic cable networks TBS, TNT and TruTV (which were formerly part of the dissolved Turner Broadcasting System subsidiary), and under the leadership of former NBC and Showtime executive Bob Greenblatt. However, Home Box Office, Inc. otherwise operates as an autonomous subsidiary within the WarnerMedia Entertainment umbrella. (Other former Turner assets were split between two other new subsidiaries: WarnerMedia News & Sports, which oversees CNN and its sister networks, Turner Sports and management operations for NBA TV, and Warner Bros. Global Kids, Young Adults and Classics, a unit of Warner Bros. that oversees such networks as Cartoon Network and Turner Classic Movies.) On May 8, 2019, as part of a broader reorganization that also brought HBO Enterprises and programming distribution for Turner Entertainment under the division, HBO parent WarnerMedia announced that HBO Home Entertainment would be transferred from Home Box Office, Inc./WarnerMedia Entertainment to Warner Bros. Worldwide Home Entertainment and Games.

On August 7, 2020, WarnerMedia restructured several of its units in a major corporate revamp that resulted in Home Box Office, Inc. and all other WarnerMedia Entertainment assets being consolidated with Warner Bros. Entertainment to form WarnerMedia Studios & Networks Group. HBO/Cinemax President of Programming Casey Bloys—who has been with Home Box Office, Inc. since 2004 (as director of development at HBO Independent Productions), and was eventually elevated to programming president in May 2016—added oversight of HBO Max and WarnerMedia's basic cable networks to his purview. (The restructuring also resulted in the three former Turner networks reassigned to WarnerMedia Entertainment being brought back under the same umbrella as sister networks Cartoon Network/Adult Swim, Boomerang and Turner Classic Movies.) Among the around 800 employees whose positions were eliminated as part of the changes, the restructuring resulted in the layoffs of around 150 Home Box Office, Inc. employees.

=== WarnerMedia-Discovery merger ===
On May 17, 2021, AT&T and Discovery, Inc. reached a definitive Reverse Morris Trust agreement, in which AT&T would spin out WarnerMedia into an independent company (unwinding the prior 2017 acquisition of the former Time Warner) that would concurrently acquire Discovery's assets, for $43 billion in cash, securities and stock plus WarnerMedia's retention of certain debt. Under the transaction, which was expected to be finalized by the second quarter of 2022, Home Box Office Inc. and all other assets of WarnerMedia would be combined with the assets of Discovery, Inc. (such as Discovery Channel, Animal Planet, Discovery+, Eurosport, GolfTV, Golf Digest, Golf World, Really, Motor Trend Group, Food Network, Discovery Family, HGTV, Asian Food Network, Travel Channel, TVN Group, Frisbee, K2, Discovery New Zealand, Tele 5, TLC and many more). AT&T shareholders would own 71% of the company's stock and Discovery shareholders would own the remaining 29% share, with each shareholder group appointing representative board members; David Zaslav, President and CEO of Discovery, would head the new company, replacing WarnerMedia CEO Jason Kilar.

On June 1, 2021, it was announced that the merged company would be known as Warner Bros. Discovery; Zaslav explained that it would reflect "the combination of Warner Bros.' fabled hundred-year legacy of creative, authentic storytelling and taking bold risks to bring the most amazing stories to life, with Discovery’s global brand that has always stood brightly for integrity, innovation and inspiration." The merger was officially completed on April 8, 2022, with Home Box Office, Inc. becoming a subsidiary of WBD; in addition to his existing duties as CEO of Home Box Office, Inc., Casey Bloys—one of four upper-level WarnerMedia division executives to remain with WBD post-merger—assumed oversight of Magnolia Network (through parent unit Warner Bros. Discovery Lifestyle Brands), which had previously been managed alongside Discovery's other factual and lifestyle brands. (The other Discovery networks continue to report to Kathleen Finch, who also assumed oversight of the combined company's entertainment-formatted U.S. basic linear networks, including those that previously reported to Bloys under WarnerMedia.)

=== Acquisition by Paramount Skydance ===
On October 31, 2025, Netflix, Inc. was reported to be actively exploring a bid for the studio and streaming assets of Warner Bros. Discovery. According to the report, Netflix retained investment bank Moelis & Co. to evaluate a potential offer and had been granted access to Warner Bros. Discovery's financial data room as part of its preparatory due-diligence. The acquisition would give Netflix control over major IP such as the Harry Potter and DC Comics franchises, along with HBO's premium dramas, as well as with Warner Bros.' distribution rights to several foreign-produced movies such as Under Parallel Skies and Ex Ex Lovers which were already available on Netflix prior these acquisition deals. Netflix stressed that it remains "predominantly focused on growing organically" and is not interested in owning legacy cable networks such as CNN, TBS and TNT.

On December 4, 2025, Netflix won the bidding war for Warner Bros. Discovery, to be followed by exclusive talks to finalize a deal. On December 5, Netflix announced that they would be taking over Warner Bros. Discovery for $72 billion, with a total asset value of $82.7 billion. As part of the deal, Netflix will acquire the Warner Bros. division, including its film, television and video game studios, HBO/HBO Max and their respective libraries, DC Entertainment/DC Studios and WBD's distribution, publishing and licensing divisions. Under the terms of the deal, the linear networks would be split into Discovery Global, as planned.

On February 26, 2026, Warner Bros. Discovery confirmed that it considered Paramount's updated bid to be superior to Netflix's current offer, triggering a four-business-day period during which Netflix could improve its offer. Netflix subsequently declined to increase its bid, stating that the deal was "no longer financially attractive."

== Properties ==
=== Current ===
- HBO
  - HBO Hits
  - HBO Drama
  - HBO Comedy
  - HBO Movies
  - HBO Latino (U.S. only)
- HBO International
  - HBO Latin America / HBO Brasil / HBO Caribbean
    - HBO2
    - HBO Plus (HBO+)
    - HBO Family
    - HBO Signature
    - HBO Mundi
    - HBO Pop
    - HBO Xtreme
  - HBO Asia
    - HBO Family
    - HBO Hits
    - HBO Signature
  - HBO Europe
    - HBO Europe Original Programming Ltd. (producer of several local original scripted programming and series based on licensed formats for Central and Eastern Europe, based in London, England, United Kingdom)
    - HBO2
    - HBO3
- Cinemax
  - Cinemax Hits (U.S. only)
  - Cinemax Action (U.S. only)
  - Cinemax Classics (U.S. only)
  - Cinemáx (U.S. only, Spanish language simulcast feed of the primary Cinemax channel)
  - Cinemax on Demand
  - Cinemax (Latin America, Brazil and the Caribbean) (supported-basic cable channel) (managed through Warner Bros. Discovery International)
  - Cinemax (Asia) (managed through Warner Bros. Discovery International)
  - Cinemax (Europe) (managed through Warner Bros. Discovery International)
  - Cinemax 2 (Europe) (managed through Warner Bros. Discovery International
- HBO Bulk (formerly HBO Direct) – sales distributor for hospitality properties, colleges and apartments
- HBO Films
- HBO Documentary Films

=== Former assets ===
==== Divested ====
- BET Holdings, Inc. – 15% with Robert Johnson, BET executives and shareholders, Taft Television & Radio Company and Liberty Media/Tele-Communications, Inc. (1985–1996)
- Bad Wolf Ltd – television production company (minority stake, operated with Sky)
- Comedy Central – 50% with Viacom (1989–2004) after merging the Comedy Channel with Ha!
- TriStar Pictures – joint venture with CBS and Columbia Pictures (1983–1986)

==== Dormant, transferred or shuttered ====
- Festival (1986–1988)
- HBO Boxing Pay-Per-View (1990–2018; formerly known as TVKO and HBO PPV)
- HBO Family (1996–2025; U.S. only)
- HBO Home Entertainment (1984–2019; transferred to Warner Bros. Home Entertainment)
- HBO Home Satellite (1986–2007; folded into HBO Bulk)
- HBO Defined (India)
- HBO Downtown Productions (1989–2002; pre-1992 library owned by HBO)
- HBO Hits (India)
- HBO Independent Productions (1990–2006)
- HBO Latin America Group (1991–2020)
- HBO Netherlands – joint venture with Ziggo
- HBO Now (2015–2020; phased out and superseded by HBO Max)
- HBO Go (2010–2024; international streaming service, phased out and superseded by Max)
- HBO Nordic (2012–2021; superseded by HBO Max)
- HBO Portugal (2019–2022; superseded by HBO Max)
- HBO España (2016–2021; superseded by HBO Max)
- HBO Kids (2001–2024)
- HBO New Zealand (2011–2026)
- HBO NYC Productions (1986–1999; formerly known as HBO Showcase, folded into HBO Films)
- Red by HBO (24/7 Asian cinema channel; joint venture with Mei Ah Entertainment) (2010–2021)
- Take 2 (1979–1981)
- ThrillerMax
- MovieMax
- OuterMax
