= HBO Hits =

HBO Hits may refer to:

- HBO Hits (Asia), a Southeast Asian TV channel
- HBO Hits (United States), formerly HBO2
