= Serangoon Road =

Australian-Singaporean TV drama

- Genre: Period drama Film noir
- Created by: Paul D. Barron
- Written by: Michaeley O'Brien; Christopher D Hawkshaw; Tony Morphett
- Directed by: Peter Andrikidis; Tony Tilse
- Starring: Don Hany; Joan Chen; Alaric Tay; Michael Dorman; Pamelyn Chee et al.
- Theme music composer: Cezary Skubiszewski; Jan Skubiszewski
- Countries of origin: Australia; Singapore
- Original language: English
- No. of seasons: 1
- No. of episodes: 10

Production
- Executive producers: Carole Sklan; Greeg Simpkin; Sue Masters; Erika North; Saralo MacGregor; Mike Wiluan; Michael O'Donnell
- Producers: Paul Barron; Nick North
- Production locations: Singapore; Batam, Indonesia
- Running time: 55 minutes

Original release
- Network: ABC; HBO Asia; RED by HBO
- Release: 22 September – 29 November 2013

Serangoon Road is an Australian-Singaporean drama television series that premiered on 22 September 2013 on ABC and HBO Asia. It is a detective noir drama set in Singapore in the mid-1960s.

The series takes its name from the eponymous road in Singapore's Little India area. The 10-part series is a collaboration between ABC and HBO Asia and was filmed largely in Singapore. It was created by Paul D. Barron and directed by Peter Andrikidis and Tony Tilse.

The final episode of the series aired on 29 November 2013. Though the series received encouraging ratings, HBO has no plans for a second season.

== Plot ==
The series is set in Singapore during the mid-1960s, a tumultuous time in the island's history. The island state is at a crossroads as it is about to break away from the newly created federation of Malaysia and become an independent country. The British colonial rulers are gradually pulling out of the country, while racial and political tensions are running high and the ensuing riots are threatening national security. Communist insurgency movements are active in neighbouring countries and trying to push into Singapore.

The protagonist Sam Callaghan is an Australian living in Singapore. As a child, he was interned in Changi Prison by the occupying Japanese and later joined the military, serving in Malaya. He now runs an import/export business with his partner Kang. Sam agrees to help neighbour Patricia Cheng at her detective agency after her husband is killed while working on a case.

== Cast ==
- Don Hany as Sam Callaghan
- Joan Chen as Patricia Cheng, runs the Cheng Detective Agency after the death of her husband.
- Michael Dorman as Conrad Harrison, young American CIA agent.
- Maeve Dermody as Claire Simpson, married to Frank, and having an affair with Sam.
- Rachael Blake as Lady Tuckworth
- Ario Bayu as Inspector Amran
- Tony Martin as Macca, Australian journalist.
- Nicholas Bell as Maxwell Black
- Jeremy Lindsay Taylor as Frank Simpson, expat businessman, Claire's husband.
- P.J. Lane
- Pamelyn Chee as Su Ling
- Chin Han as Kay Song
- Alaric Tay as Kang
- Cleave Williams as Nate Crosby
- Shane Briant as Major Miller
- Valentine Payen as Young Sam's Mother
- Edmund Chen as James Lim
- Russell Wong as Winston Cheng
- Christian Matthew Wong as Xiao Qiang
- Bernard Tan as Chan Li / Zhang Heng
- Ernie Dingo as Robbo
- Geoff Morrell as Sir Philip Tuckworth
- Ella Scott Lynch as Angelica Warnock
- Clarence Ryan as Young Robbo

== Episodes ==
No.	Title	Directed by	Written by	Original release date
1	"Episode 1"	Peter Andrikidis	Michaeley O'Brien	22 September 2013
2	"Episode 2"	Peter Andrikidis	Michaeley O'Brien	29 September 2013
3	"Episode 3"	Peter Andrikidis	Christopher D Hawkshaw	6 October 2013
4	"Episode 4"	Peter Andrikidis	Tony Morphett	13 October 2013
5	"Episode 5"	Peter Andrikidis	Michaeley O'Brien	20 October 2013
6	"Episode 6"	Tony Tilse	Margaret Wilson	1 November 2013
7	"Episode 7"	Tony Tilse	Justin Monjo	8 November 2013
8	"Episode 8"	Tony Tilse	Kym Goldsworthy & Timothy Lee	15 November 2013
9	"Episode 9"	Tony Tilse	Michaeley O'Brien	22 November 2013
10	"Episode 10"	Tony Tilse	Michaeley O'Brien	29 November 2013

== Production ==
Because little remains of 1960s Singapore, the series was largely filmed on the soundstages of Singapore's Infinite Studios, in the ‘Chinatown’ streetscape on its backlot, and rural locations on the nearby island of Batam (Indonesia). Location shooting was done at the Raffles Hotel and other expatriate locations, and the merchant shop houses of Joo Chat Road heritage area. The actual Serangoon Road, a major artery that became a predominantly Indian district, does not figure in the series apart from the title.

== International broadcasts ==
Country/Region	Network	Premiere date	Ref.
Gibraltar	GBC TV	25 March 2014	
United Kingdom	Sony Channel	9 April 2014	
Brazil	Max Prime	30 June 2014	
France	France Ô	30 August 2014	
