= Catchplay =

Taiwanese multimedia company

CATCHPLAY
- Industry: Entertainment
- Founded: 2007; 19 years ago
- Headquarters: Taipei, Taiwan
- Key people: Cher Wang, Chen Chu Wan, Daphne Yang
- Products: OTT platform; Television syndication; Film production; Film distribution; Digital distribution; Mobile entertainment
- Parent: CATCHPLAY Media Holding Company
- Website: www.catchplay.com

CATCHPLAY is a Taiwanese multimedia company. The business includes over-the-top VOD streaming service, linear television channel operation (CATCHPLAY Movie Channel), and theatrical film distribution. It operates as the Taiwanese branch of CATCHPLAY, Inc. (Chinese: 威望國際娛樂股份有限公司), a company registered in the Cayman Islands.

In 2014 the brand began expanding into other areas of the movie entertainment industry. Its first production investment was co-financing the Taiwanese film Paradise in Service. Since then, CATCHPLAY has expanded its investments to include three New Regency films, most notably The Revenant and Assassin’s Creed in 2016–17. In 2015, CATCHPLAY began partnering with local telecom providers across Southeast Asia to launch CATCHPLAY On Demand, a premium movie on-demand service.

== History ==
Originally established in 2005 in Fremont, CA, VIA OnDemand announced its digital download offering during Computex in Taipei, Taiwan, in 2006. They later rebranded as CATCHPLAY. In 2008, CATCHPLAY announced its intention to expand into theatrical distribution and relocated to Taiwan.

Capitalizing on the digitalization of Taiwan's pay-to-view TV, CATCHPLAY Movie Channel launched in early 2013. Today the service has approximately one million subscribers and is one of Taiwan's most popular digital movie channels. The channel officially replaced Star Chinese Movies on January 1, 2024, following the earlier channel closure due to Disney+ rollouts.

CATCHPLAY made its first feature film investment by co-financing the Taiwanese film Paradise in Service; which premiered as the opening film at the 2014 Busan International Film Festival. That same year, CATCHPLAY co-produced 20 Once Again with CJ Entertainment and the film went on to gross $380M RMB at the box office in China.

In early 2015, CATCHPLAY established a partnership to invest in three New Regency titles – The Revenant, Assassin’s Creed and Splinter Cell – marking the first investment by a Taiwanese company in major Hollywood productions. CATCHPLAY and its partners exclusively distributed the films in China, Hong Kong, Macau and Taiwan. Additionally, CATCHPLAY supported shooting for and invested in the production of Martin Scorsese’s passion project, Silence, which was shot entirely in Taiwan.

In July 2020, CATCHPLAY partnered with Taiwan Creative Content Agency (TAICCA) to form the joint venture SCREENWORKS ASIA, aiming to support the development of Taiwanese films and TV series. They were credited on the second season of coming-of-age family dramedy The Making of An Ordinary Woman and their first unscripted talk show Dee's Talk. CATCHPLAY was also a co-producer and co-distributor of The World Between Us alongside HBO Asia.
