= Mei Ah Entertainment =

Hong Kong media distribution company

Mei Ah Entertainment Group Co., Ltd.
- Native name: 美亞娛樂資訊集團公司
- Type: Public company
- Industry: Media Publishing
- Founded: 1984
- Headquarters: Tseung Kwan O Industrial Estate, Hong Kong
- Key people: Li Kuo Hsing (Chairman)
- Products: VCD, DVD, Blu-ray, TV channel
- Website: meiah.com

Mei Ah Entertainment Group Co., Ltd. (Chinese: 美亞娛樂) (SEHK: 391) is a media distribution company in Hong Kong.

== History ==
The company was established in 1984 in Kowloon Bay by Li Kuo Hsing. During the 1980s, its principal activities were the distribution of videocassette tapes and laser discs. It has been one of the largest videofilm and TV drama distributors of film and TV drama in Hong Kong. Movies distributed by the company are also branded in the film and on the boxes. The company continued to expand until it was listed on the Hong Kong Stock Exchange in 1993. Since 1997, the Group has been actively engaging in film investment, productions and has extended its distribution network to all over the world. From 1999, the Group has been involved in the business of TV program production and distribution. Since 2000, the Group has been dedicated to developing business in film production, television channel operation and multimedia distribution. The Group has co-operated with various TV and telecommunication networks in launching a number of channels.

== TV channels ==
- Launched Mei Ah Drama Channel (channel 138) in now TV since November 2004 broadcasting TV dramas from Japan, Korea, Taiwan and China. (Discontinued in January 2012)
- Launched Mei Ah Movie Channel (channel 812) in now TV since September 2005 broadcasting Hong Kong and Asian movies, Until in at 1 July 2014 to come Back With TVB Network Vision Channel 52.(Two Pay TV Providers has been Ceased Transmission on 1 April and 1 June 2017; Now Available in myTV SUPER Channel 201)
- Launched Mei Ah Movie Channel (channel 577) in Mio TV since July 2007 broadcasting Hong Kong and Asian movies. (Discontinued in September 2013)
- Launched Mei Ah Japan Channel (channel 785) in SKY PerfecTV 785 since March 2008 through Direct To Home satellite broadcasting Hong Kong and Asian movies and dramas.
- Launched Mei Ah Drama Channel (channel 73) in Mio TV since October 2008 broadcasting TV dramas from Japan, Korea, Taiwan and China.(Ceased transmission since on 31 October 2011)
- In December 2009, the Group and HBO Asia joined to launch the RED Channel in Asia. (Renamed RED by HBO in October 2015.)
- Launched Mei Ah HD Movie Channel (channel 60, Renumbering Of Channel 610 From November 2017) in MOD Taiwan in August 2010, broadcasting HD movies and TV dramas.
- Provides video on demand ("VOD") and monthly subscription video on demand ("SVOD") services in Hong Kong myTV Super (Subscription Only).
- In December 2013, Mei Ah and Playboy collaborated to launch Lifestyle TV, the first men's lifestyle TV channel in the Asia Pacific, for men ages 18 to 38.

== See also ==
- Golden Harvest
