= Red by HBO =

Southeast Asian pay television movie channel

- Country: Singapore; Malaysia; Philippines; Thailand; Indonesia; Vietnam
- Broadcast area: Asia (except Hong Kong)
- Headquarters: Lorong Chuan New Tech Park, Singapore

Programming
- Language(s): English (main); Chinese (Mandarin & Cantonese); Japanese; Korean; Indonesian; Malay; Filipino; Thai; Vietnamese
- Picture format: 1080i HDTV (downscaled to 480i/576i 16:9 or letterboxed for the SDTV feed)

Ownership
- Owner: HBO Asia Pte. Ltd. (WarnerMedia International)
- Sister channels: Cinemax; Boomerang; Cartoon Network; CNN International; HBO; HBO Signature; HBO Hits; HBO Family; Warner TV

History
- Launched: 12 April 2010; 15 years ago
- Closed: 1 January 2017; 8 years ago (TrueVisions feed, Thailand); 1 August 2018; 7 years ago (MNC Vision feed, Indonesia); 1 October 2019; 5 years ago (Unifi TV feed, Malaysia); 13 March 2020; 5 years ago (AIS Play feed, Thailand); 1 July 2021; 4 years ago (Asia); 5 July 2021; 4 years ago (South Korea)
- Former names: Screen RED (2010-2015)

Links
- Website: https://www.redbyhbo.com (now defunct)

Red by HBO (formerly Screen Red, but simply known as Red) was a Southeast Asian pay television movie channel. It was a joint venture between HBO Asia and the Hong Kong studio Mei Ah Entertainment. Launched in 2010, the channel focused primarily on films from Asian countries, all of which are presented in their original language and with localized subtitles available. The channel was unlike most HBO networks in that it carried advertising.

== History ==
On December 1, 2009, HBO Asia partners with Mei Ah Entertainment to launch its new channel on Spring 2010 featuring Asian films; the channel was officially launched on April 12, 2010, across Asia-Pacific in partnership with Mei Ah Entertainment as HBO Asia's first 24-hour Asian movie pay television channel. During the launch, this aired several Asian films from many distributors including those from Chinese, Japanese and beyond, it also aired Asian TV programming. The channel which later expanded to Malaysia circa early October 2010, then the Philippines and Thailand in 2012 and 2013 respectively.

In October 2015, the channel rebranded as Red by HBO. The rebranding signified a widening in the channel's scope to cover all of Southeast Asia (in addition to China, Japan, and South Korea); and a new on-air appearance meant to evoke contemporary interpretations of Asian imagery.

On July 1, 2021, Red by HBO was discontinued throughout Asia, with the last film(s) aired The Garden of Evening Mists and Helen the Baby Fox.
