= HBO Asia =

Southeast Asian pay television network

- Country: Singapore
- Broadcast area: Southeast Asia; Hong Kong; Macau; Nepal; Sri Lanka; Taiwan
- Network: HBO
- Headquarters: 1 Fusionopolis Walk, #13-01 Solaris, Singapore 138628

Programming
- Languages: English; Chinese (Mandarin/Cantonese); Malay; Indonesian; Thai; Vietnamese (subtitles)
- Picture format: 1080i HDTV

Ownership
- Owner: Skydance
- Parent: Home Box Office, Inc.

History
- Launched: 1 May 1992; 34 years ago
- Replaced: Red by HBO (Philippines, SatLite only)
- Closed: 1 January 2017; 9 years ago (Truevisions); 12 May 2023; 3 years ago (MNC Vision); 1 December 2025; 11 months ago (Sky Cable); 1 March 2026; 8 months ago (Astro Malaysia); 21 August 2026; 2 months ago (Cignal); 21 August 2026; 2 months ago (SatLite)
- Former names: MovieVision (1992–1995)

Availability

Terrestrial
- Cignal TV (Philippines) (Ceased operation on August 21, 2026): Channel 53 (SD); Channel 210 (HD)
- Transvision (Indonesia): Channel 100 (HD)
- SatLite (Philippines) (Ceased operation on August 21, 2026): Channel 73
- Singtel TV (Singapore): Channel 420 (HD)
- StarHub TV (Singapore): Channel 601 (HD)

HBO Asia is the Asian division of HBO, headquartered in Singapore. Originally launched on 1 May 1992 as MovieVision, it was rebranded on 1 June 1995 to its current name upon Home Box Office, Inc. purchase. The Singaporean-based broadcast network offers advertisement-free channels and services – including HBO, HBO Signature, HBO Family, HBO Hits and Cinemax – as well as HBO Go and HBO on Demand. They also became the exclusive distributor of BabyFirst in Asia.

== History ==
HBO was the first American television network to set up its bases in Singapore in 1992, with its 20,000 square feet (1,900 m^{2}) production facility based at New Tech Park in Lorong Chuan.

HBO signed an agreement with Singapore Telecom in June 1992 in order to deliver its output to Singapore CableVision's MovieVision channel, as well as other broadcasters in the region.

HBO Asia began 24-hour broadcasts on 1 March 1994 to cater to travellers visiting hotels. It also increased the number of programmes to 70 a month.

HBO Asia was originally a joint venture between Paramount Pictures, Sony Pictures, Warner Bros., and Universal Pictures. On 16 January 2008, Sony and NBC sold their stakes to WarnerMedia (then Warner Bros. Discovery, now Skydance Corporation).

== Programming ==
HBO Asia has licensing deals with the "Big Five" of Hollywood conglomerate film studios:

- Warner Bros. Discovery (Warner Bros. Pictures, New Line Cinema, HBO Films, Castle Rock Entertainment)
- Paramount Skydance (Paramount Pictures, Miramax)
- NBCUniversal (Universal Pictures, Focus Features)
- Independent Film Productions such as Regency Enterprises, STX Entertainment, Millennium Media, Highland Film Group, AGC Studios and A24, among many others.

New seasons of HBO's Original Series or Original Productions air on Sunday nights/Monday mornings.

=== Original programming ===
HBO also aired their Original Series or Original Films from Asian creators, which aired on Sunday nights. Some other Asian original titles may also be simultaneously released on other platforms, like Catchplay, which has co-produced some of HBO's Asian titles.

==== TV series ====
===== Drama =====
Title	Genre	Premiere	Seasons	Language(s)	Status
Grace	Horror drama	17 October 2014	4 episodes	English; Mandarin	Miniseries
Halfworlds	Dark fantasy thriller	29 November 2015	2 seasons, 16 episodes	English; Indonesian (season 1); Thai (season 2)	Ended
Folklore	Horror anthology	7 October 2018	2 seasons, 13 episodes	various languages	Ended
Grisse	Epic Western	6 March 2019	1 season, 8 episodes	English; Indonesian	Ended
Food Lore	Slice of life anthology	3 November 2019	1 season, 8 episodes	Various languages	Ended
Invisible Stories	Psychological drama/Anthology	5 January 2020	1 season, 6 episodes	English; Mandarin; Thai	Ended
Dream Raider	Science fiction mystery drama	16 August 2020	1 season, 8 episodes	Mandarin; Japanese	Ended
Miss S (Note: Acquired by HBO Asia from Tencent Video.)	Period action drama	5 October 2020	30 episodes	Mandarin	Miniseries
On the Job	Action thriller	13 September 2021	6 episodes	Filipino	Miniseries
Who's by Your Side	Family thriller	3 October 2021	10 episodes	Mandarin; Hokkien	Ended
Legacy (Note: Acquired by HBO Asia from Youku.)	Period family drama	20 June 2022	40 episodes	Mandarin	Miniseries
Scent of Time	Period romantic fantasy	13 October 2023	30 episodes	Mandarin	Miniseries
Song of the Samurai	Period action	9 May 2026	1 season, 8 episodes	Japanese	Pending

===== Comedy =====
Title	Genre	Premiere	Seasons	Language(s)	Status
Sent	Comedy drama	17 September 2017	1 season, 8 episodes	English	Ended
Adventure of the Ring	Romantic comedy drama	13 December 2020	8 episodes	Mandarin	Miniseries
The Accidental Influencer	Workplace romantic comedy	10 February 2024	1 season, 13 episodes	Mandarin	Pending

===== Unscripted =====
Title	Genre	Premiere	Seasons	Language(s)	Status
Traffickers: Inside the Golden Triangle	True crime docuseries	23 July 2021	3 episodes	English	Ended
Drag Race Philippines	Reality competition	17 August 2022	3 seasons, 30 episodes	Filipino; English	Pending
MarkKim + Chef	Cooking show	18 August 2023	10 episodes	Thai	Miniseries
Deane's Dynasty	Reality show	6 October 2023	1 season, 8 episodes	Thai	Pending
The Bachelor Indonesia	Dating show	10 February 2023	1 season, 10 episodes	Indonesian; English	Pending

===== Co-productions =====
These shows have been commissioned by HBO Asia with a partner network.

Title	Genre	Partner	Country	Premiere	Seasons	Language	Status
Serangoon Road	Period drama	ABC	Australia	22 September 2013	1 season, 10 episodes	English	Ended
The Teenage Psychic	Supernatural coming-of-age drama	PTS	Taiwan	2 April 2017	2 seasons, 14 episodes	Mandarin; Hokkien	Ended
The Talwars: Behind Closed Doors	True crime docuseries	Star World	India	26 November 2017	4 episodes	English	Miniseries
Miss Sherlock	Crime drama	Hulu Japan	Japan	27 April 2018	1 season, 8 episodes	Japanese	Ended
The Bridge	Crime drama	Viu	Malaysia	26 November 2018	2 seasons, 20 episodes	English; Malay; Indonesian	Ended
The World Between Us	Psychological drama	PTS and Catchplay	Taiwan	24 March 2019	1 season, 10 episodes	Mandarin	Season 2 moved to Amazon Prime Video
Workers	Dark comedy drama	myVideo	Taiwan	10 May 2020	6 episodes	Hokkien; Mandarin	Miniseries
The Head	Mystery thriller	Mediapro; Hulu Japan	Spain; Japan	12 June 2020	1 season, 6 episodes	English; Danish; Swedish; Spanish	Pending
Trinity of Shadows	Crime drama	ViuTV; Catchplay	Hong Kong; Taiwan	13 June 2021	15 episodes	Mandarin	Ended
Twisted Strings	Comedy thriller/Anthology	Catchplay; Mediacorp	Taiwan; Singapore	27 March 2022	7 episodes	Mandarin	Miniseries

==== Films ====
Title	Genre	Release date	Runtime	Language(s)
Dead Mine	Action horror	27 September 2012	1 hour, 27 min.	English
Master of the Drunken Fist: Beggar So	Action drama	25 December 2016	1 hour, 33 min.	Mandarin
Master of the Shadowless Kick: Wong Kei-Ying	Action drama	26 December 2016	1 hour, 40 min.	Mandarin
Master of the White Crane Fist: Wong Yam-Lam	Action drama	20 February 2019	1 hour, 30 min	Mandarin
Master of the Nine Dragon Fist: Wong Ching-Ho	Action drama	3 April 2019	1 hour, 37 min	Mandarin
The Garden of Evening Mists	Romantic period drama	13 September 2020	2 hour	English
Gensan Punch	Sports biographical film	27 September 2021	1 hour, 40 min.	English; Filipino; Japanese

=== Censorship ===
HBO Asia was heavily censored in some Asian countries, with many series such as Sex and the City and Game of Thrones aired in edited versions; with certain programmes are not shown in some territories.

Typically, movies showcasing gestures like the middle finger, nudity, intense intimacy, and profanity are edited out. Scenes revealing attire or exposed skin near private areas are commonly censored, especially in predominantly Muslim regions of Southeast Asia (excluding Vietnam). Additionally, depictions of alcohol or pork are often blurred, as they are considered haram in Islam.

The HBO-made series Entourage was taken off-air for three weeks by one cable operator in the Philippines, pending clearance by the MTRCB. The entire series continued to air without disruption on all other Philippine cable operators.

Vietnam receives HBO Asia programming delayed by an hour; any program broadcast on HBO Asia undergo censorship overseen by state broadcaster Vietnam Television. Any film that is judged to contradict or misrepresent the Vietnam War (such as depicting the US as heroes, which contradicts the state's official stance) or critical of the ruling Communist Party of Vietnam, or to contain explicit sexual or gruesome content deemed inconsistent with Vietnamese societal norms, will not be aired. Instead, it will be replaced with another feature. Additionally, scenes depicting nudity, violence, or mild profanity are typically toned down.

In China, due to Western product restrictions and the China-United States trade war, HBO was blocked and restricted, and the replacements are currently Tencent Video and iQIYI.

== Channels ==
Network	Description	Ref. (Note: All links were archived at the Wayback Machine.)
HBO	Hollywood films and HBO original series	
HBO Hits	Hits and blockbuster films	
HBO Family	Family oriented films and series	
HBO Signature	Critically acclaimed and original productions	
Cinemax	Action and suspense movies	

The live channels remain available on selected pay TV providers, as HBO GO no longer provides the live channels in-app and online starting 25 May 2023.

== HBO South Asia ==
HBO South Asia
- Country: India
- Broadcast area: India; Bangladesh; Maldives; Pakistan (timeshifted feed)

Programming
- Language: English
- Picture format: 1080i (HDTV)

Ownership
- Owner: WarnerMedia International (As of 2019); Turner International India (earlier)
- Sister channels: CNN International South Asia; WB (India); Pogo; Cartoon Network (India); Imagine TV; Cartoon Network (Pakistan); WB (Pakistan)

History
- Launched: 22 March 2000
- Closed: 15 December 2020

Links
- Website: see external links

HBO formerly provided a separate feed with commercial breaks for audiences in South Asia, namely India, Bangladesh and the Maldives. All movie promos in this beam were according to IST. A time-shifted feed for Pakistan was launched in the mid-2000s in partnership with ARY Digital Network. The schedule was the same as the Indian feed, with the difference being the commercial breaks and timings in PST.

Before the launch of HBO South Asia, HBO tried replicating the premium model in India. However, HBO then decided it was not commercially viable, so the South Asia channel was launched in Bangladesh, India, Maldives, and Pakistan.

HBO Asia and Eros International launched HBO Defined and HBO Hits across India on 21 February 2013 on Dish TV and Airtel Digital TV. These channels were commercial-free. The content of both channels included movies as well as most of HBO Original Programming. When the channels launched, the main HBO channel stopped airing original series.

In 2015, HBO decided to exit the Indian market and license the channel to Turner International India. The channel was revamped in February 2016 after a survey conducted by the channel team to better suit the masses. HBO Defined and HBO Hits would be handled by Star India; however, HBO Defined and HBO Hits SD were shut down on 31 December 2015, while HBO Hits HD was replaced by HBO HD on 4 September 2016. It only airs Hollywood movies, as Star India has the rights to HBO Original Programming, which is available on Star World and Disney+ Hotstar.

WarnerMedia International announced on 15 October 2020 that HBO South Asia and WB Channel would close down on 15 December 2020. The HBO channel would no longer be available in India and Pakistan, while WB Channel ceased to exist in India, Bangladesh, Pakistan, and the Maldives.

HBO India had closed down at midnight with the last movie on the SD channel being Mad Max: Fury Road (completed 1 hour before the shutdown) and the last movie on the HD channel being Memoirs of a Geisha. HBO Pakistan was also closed down at midnight.

== See also ==
- HBO
- Cinemax
