= HBO Now =

Former American video-on-demand streaming service

- Website type: Video on demand
- Available in: English
- Founded: October 15, 2014; 11 years ago
- Dissolved: December 17, 2020; 5 years ago
- Successor: HBO Max
- Headquarters: New York, New York, {{{location_country}}}
- Area served: United States
- Owner: WarnerMedia
- Key people: Ann Sarnoff (chairperson, WarnerMedia Studios & Networks Group)
- Services: OTT streaming service
- Parent: HBO
- Registration: Monthly subscription through authorized distributor required to access content
- Users: Five million paying subscribers (2018)
- Launched: April 7, 2015; 11 years ago
- Current status: Closed. App replaced by HBO Max; served as default HBO streaming platform for select digital marketplaces until December 2020

HBO Now (known as HBO from August to December 2020) was an American subscription video on demand streaming service for premium television network HBO owned by WarnerMedia subsidiary Home Box Office, Inc. Announced on March 9 and launched on April 7, 2015, the service allowed subscribers on-demand access to HBO's library of original programs, films and other content on personal computers, smartphones, tablet devices and digital media players. Unlike HBO Go, HBO's online video on demand service for subscribers of the linear television channel, HBO Now was available as a standalone service and did not require a television subscription to use, targeting cord cutters who use competing services such as Netflix and Hulu. In February 2018, HBO Now had five million subscribers.

HBO Now was succeeded on May 27, 2020 by HBO Max, a DTC service that also includes content from Warner Bros. and other WarnerMedia properties. Subscribers of the linear HBO television service and HBO Now were able to use HBO Max at no additional cost, although some providers did not immediately reach agreements (Amazon did not reach an agreement until mid-November, while Roku would not reach a deal until mid-December 2020). The "HBO Now" branding was removed at the end of July, while the service and app remained available for Roku OS and select TiVo users; support for the HBO streaming app was discontinued on December 17, 2020, when Roku replaced it with HBO Max.

== Development ==
On October 15, 2014, following a trial of a similar service in Nordic Europe, HBO announced plans to launch an online, subscription video on demand service in the United States in 2015. The service would target cord cutters, consumers who primarily use online video services to view television programs rather than subscribe to cable or satellite television, and would not have to be purchased as part of a television subscription, therefore also making it a competitor to services such as Netflix. This contrasted with HBO's other online video on demand service, HBO Go, which was only accessible to those who subscribed to HBO through a television provider.

On December 9, 2014, it was reported that HBO had outsourced development of the service's infrastructure to Major League Baseball Advanced Media (MLBAM), who also developed the infrastructures used by WatchESPN and WWE Network. The network was previously working on a new platform codenamed "Maui"; however HBO, especially after major outages of HBO Go that occurred during several season premieres of HBO series, felt that outsourcing the service to a third-party would bring lower risk to the project. Otto Berkes resigned as the company's Chief Technical Officer following this move.

The service was announced as HBO Now during an Apple press event on March 9, 2015. It was also announced that Apple would be the service's exclusive launch partner, with the HBO Now app being exclusive to Apple TV and iOS devices for a three-month period following the service's launch. HBO Now was also accessible via a website. HBO Now launched on April 7, 2015, to coincide with the April 12 premiere of the fifth season of Game of Thrones. Apple retained 15% of the monthly subscription fee from users who signed up from an iOS device.

Following the end of the exclusivity period, HBO Now for Android and Amazon Kindle Fire was released on July 16, 2015. HBO Now apps for Xbox 360 and Xbox One were released on April 21, 2016. On September 15, 2016, Sony announced that HBO Now would be available on the PlayStation 3 and PlayStation 4, which was later released on September 29, in anticipation for the series premiere of Westworld on October 2, and that anyone that subscribed to HBO on PlayStation Vue would be able to access HBO Now at no extra cost.

On May 27, 2020, WarnerMedia launched HBO Max, a successor to HBO Now that additionally incorporates a broad array of content from other WarnerMedia properties and third-party content providers. HBO Now subscribers that had been billed directly by HBO were migrated to HBO Max on-launch at no additional cost. HBO Now was not immediately discontinued, with WarnerMedia noting that some streaming devices would not be immediately supported on the service, and renegotiations would be required with third-party resellers such as Apple, Roku and Hulu.

Apple and Hulu would reach agreements to replace HBO Now with HBO Max. On June 12, 2020, HBO announced that the HBO Now app on remaining platforms not supported by HBO Max at the time (including Amazon Fire OS, Roku OS and select legacy TiVo devices) would be rebranded as simply "HBO" on August 1. Support for TiVo devices was discontinued on August 31, 2020, but without a replacement as the DVR manufacturer had not reached a deal to replace it with HBO Max. The HBO app was relegated thereafter to a default HBO streaming platform for remaining major streaming marketplaces Amazon and Roku, which delayed replacement for several months due to disagreements over contractual distribution terms. Amazon Fire OS and Fire TV devices replaced it with HBO Max on November 16, 2020. Roku OS continued to offer the HBO app thereafter; however, on December 16, Roku reached an agreement with WarnerMedia to offer HBO Max on its television sets and set-top devices effective the following day. As a result, the HBO Now/HBO streaming app was discontinued on December 17, with subscribers of the app through Roku being converted to HBO Max and Roku remotes manufactured between 2015 and 2020 with a HBO Now shortcut button now automatically redirecting users to the HBO Max app.

== Content ==
HBO Now offered on-demand access to most of HBO's library of original series, but did not have the rights to several pre-internet era series such as Tales from the Crypt, Tenacious D, 1st & Ten, Da Ali G Show, and The Ricky Gervais Show, where rights reverted to their original studios. The Larry Sanders Show and Arliss were initially unavailable but were added in 2016 and 2018, respectively. It also streamed HBO's original films and documentaries, along with acquired films from its library through the cable channel's content partners (such as 20th Century Studios, Universal Pictures and HBO sister company Warner Bros. Pictures).

Along with HBO Go and HBO On Demand, HBO Now strictly served as a video on demand service and had no access to near-real-time streams of HBO's linear channels, unlike similar (in particular, TV Everywhere) streaming services offered by other television networks. HBO Now never featured programming streams or content from sister premium service Cinemax, whose programming was available through selected vMVPD services including Hulu + Live TV, Prime Video Channels, and the Apple TV app.

== Availability ==
Due to regional rights restrictions, HBO Now was only available to customers in the United States and certain territories of the same country. Its terms of use explicitly forbid the service from being used outside the United States. Users from outside the U.S. that were detected to have used services such as virtual private networks (VPN) to evade the geo-blocking to use HBO Now were subject to have their services terminated with no refund.

In many other countries, HBO licensed exclusive rights to its programming to television networks owned by third parties, including Bell Media's Crave (formerly The Movie Network, and including an HBO-branded multiplex channel) and Super Écran in Canada, and Sky Atlantic in the United Kingdom. In these cases, HBO depended on individual rightsholders to decide whether to offer its programming on an over-the-top basis. In Canada, the Crave OTT streaming service launched a version with current HBO programming in November 2018.

On April 1, 2015, as part of an agreement with Time Warner Cable that renewed its carriage contract for the Turner Broadcasting System networks and gave its over-the-top television service Sling TV distribution rights to the linear HBO channel, Dish Network announced an option to become a distribution partner for HBO Now following the exclusivity period with Apple. HBO content were also available as a premium add-on for Amazon Video, DirecTV Now, Hulu, PlayStation Vue for the same $14.99 price as HBO Now.

The over-the-top service was launched in Latin America in June 2017, although under the name HBO Go.

== Reception ==
Analysts predicted HBO Now had over one million paying subscribers on iOS platforms in July 2015. In February 2016, Time Warner stated that HBO Now had over 800,000 paying subscribers, by February 2017, it had two million. A year later, in February 2018, it had raised to five million.
