= HBO Signature (Asia) =

Asian pay television network

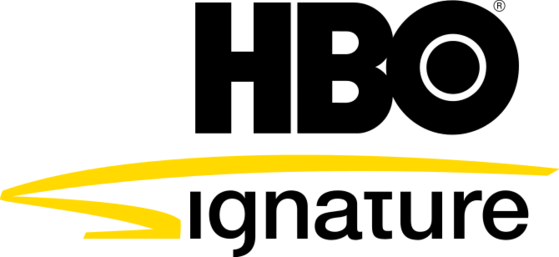
- Country: Singapore
- Broadcast area: Southeast Asia, East Asia
- Network: HBO
- Headquarters: 151 Lorong Chuan, New Tech Park 04–05, Singapore

Programming
- Language: English
- Picture format: 1080i HDTV

Ownership
- Owner: HBO Asia Pte Ltd (Skydance Corporation)
- Sister channels: HBO; HBO Hits; HBO Family; Cinemax

History
- Launched: 1 January 2005; 21 years ago
- Closed: 1 January 2017; 9 years ago Thailand (Truevisions); 12 May 2023; 3 years ago Indonesia (MNC Vision); 1 December 2025; 11 months ago Philippines (Sky Cable)

Links
- Website: Official website

Availability

Terrestrial
- Cignal TV (Philippines): Channel 213 (HD)
- StarHub TV (Singapore): Channel 603 (HD)
- Singtel TV (Singapore): Channel 421 (HD)

Streaming media
- HBO Go: Watch live

HBO Signature is a Southeast Asian pay television network owned by HBO Asia featuring Hollywood blockbuster movies, regardless of genre.

On 1 March 2019, In a preparation for the 8th and final season of Game of Thrones, the channel was temporarily re-branded as HBO Signature Game of Thrones, a dedicated channel that airs past seasons and exclusive behind-the-scene features from the series until 30 April 2019.

== Programming ==
HBO Signature Asia has licensing deals with 5 major Hollywood conglomerate film studios:

- Warner Bros. Discovery (Warner Bros. Pictures, New Line Cinema, HBO Films, Castle Rock Entertainment, Warner Independent Pictures)
- Paramount Skydance (Paramount Pictures, Paramount Vantage)
- NBCUniversal (Universal Pictures)
- Sony Pictures
- Independent Film Productions such as Lionsgate Films, Regency Enterprises, Metro-Goldwyn-Mayer, A24, etc.

== Other channels ==
Network	Description	Website
HBO Hits	Shows hits and blockbuster films	Official site
HBO Hits HD	Shows hits and blockbuster films in High Definition.	Official site
HBO Family	Shows family oriented films	Official site
HBO	Shows Hollywood films and HBO Original series	Official site
HBO HD	Shows Hollywood movies and HBO Originals in High Definition	Official site
HBO On Demand	Shows the best Hollywood films and outstanding HBO Originals at your control	Official site
Cinemax	Shows action and suspense movies and horror and thriller movies	Official site
Red by HBO	HBO Asia's brand new 24-hour, Asian movie channel	Official site
