= Festival (TV channel) =

Defunct American pay television channel

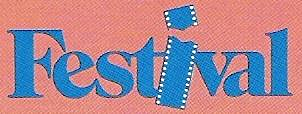
- Country: United States
- Broadcast area: Nationwide (in select markets)
- Headquarters: New York City, New York

Programming
- Language: English

Ownership
- Owner: Home Box Office, Inc. (Time Inc.)
- Sister channels: HBO; Cinemax

History
- Launched: April 1, 1986; 40 years ago
- Closed: December 31, 1988; 37 years ago

Festival was an American premium cable television network that was owned by Home Box Office, Inc., then a subsidiary of Time Inc., and operated from 1986 to 1988. The channel's programming consisted of uncut and re-edited versions of recent older theatrically released motion pictures, along original music, comedy and nature specials sourced from the parent HBO channel aimed at a family audience.

== History ==
Cover of the January 1988 issue of Festival's monthly program guide.

On April 1, 1986, HBO began test-marketing a tertiary premium service, Festival, to an estimated 850 subscribers over six cable systems owned by then-sister company American Television and Communications Corporation (eventually expanding to 25 systems by the Summer of 1986). The channel—which transmitted for 19 hours each day from 7:00 a.m. to 2:00 a.m. Eastern Time daily—was targeted at older audiences who found programming containing violence and sexual situations on other premium services objectionable, television viewers without cable service, and basic cable subscribers that opted against retaining a subscription to a premium service. Its slogan, Quality Entertainment You Welcome Home, reflected the target audience it was trying to attract.

Primarily to cater to the former demographic, Festival focused around family-friendly fare that included classic and recent hit movies (including collections of feature films starring a featured actor, known as "Star Salutes"), and documentaries, along with HBO original stand-up comedy, concert, nature and ice skating specials (which Festival branded under the "Centerstage" banner). Atypical for a premium service, Festival aired "airline-style" versions of R-rated movies re-edited to fit a PG rating on the channel's schedule.

As Festival was designed as a mini-pay premium service (similar to Take 2—HBO's first attempt at a complimentary pay service from 1979 to 1981—before it), subscription pricing for the channel was set lower than that of HBO and Cinemax (between $2.99 and $6.99 per month—equivalent to between $7.24 and $16.92 in 2024, adjusted for inflation—depending on the cable system). Festival also provided subscribers with a 20-page, color monthly program guide. Like HBO, Festival also ran occasional free preview periods, such as the October 30 to November 2, 1987, preview hosted by Tony Randall.

On July 14, 1988, Home Box Office, Inc. announced it would shut down Festival at the end of the year, citing headend channel capacity limitations that prevented Festival from expanding beyond the 102 systems that already carried the service. The channel had reoriented its marketing initiatives to aggressively target cable subscribers who subscribed to another pay service. At its peak, Festival had an estimated 30,000 subscribers by the Summer of 1988, putting it at a distant last place in total subscriber reach among the eight American premium cable services operating at the time. (By comparison, during the same timeframe, HBO had reached 15.9 million subscribers and fellow sister channel Cinemax reached 5.1 million, while Festival's most direct competitor, The Disney Channel—then also a family-oriented premium service until it shifted to basic cable in April 1997—had 3.18 million subscribers.) Festival ceased operations on December 31, 1988.
