= HBO Netherlands =

Dutch TV channel

HBO Nederland
- Country: Netherlands
- Broadcast area: Netherlands

Programming
- Language: English with Dutch subtitles
- Picture format: 576i (SDTV); 1080i (HDTV)

Ownership
- Owner: Time Warner (HBO); Liberty Global (Ziggo)

History
- Launched: 9 February 2012; 14 years ago
- Closed: 31 December 2016; 9 years ago

HBO Nederland (Home Box Office) was a Dutch premium television network, owned by a joint venture between HBO and the largest cable television operator in the Netherlands, Ziggo. It launched on 9 February 2012. HBO Nederland offered three television channels, available in HD and SD, video-on-demand services and HBO GO. The programming consisted of HBO's own productions, TV series, documentaries and films from Warner Bros.

HBO Netherlands closed on 31 December 2016. Cable company Ziggo has acquired the broadcasting licenses of HBO content for the Dutch market.

== Channels ==
- HBO: Main flagship channel with television premieres
- HBO 2: Second channel with a focus on drama and comedy
- HBO 3: Third channel with a focus on action and thriller
- HBO On Demand
- HBO GO

== See also ==
- HBO
- Television in the Netherlands
