= Cinemax (Asian TV channel) =

Asian premium television channel

Cinemax Asia
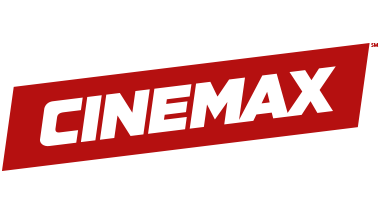
- Country: Singapore
- Broadcast area: Southeast Asia; Hong Kong; Taiwan
- Network: HBO Asia
- Headquarters: Singapore

Programming
- Languages: English (Hong Kong, Malaysia, Singapore and Philippines); Mandarin (Singapore, Taiwan, Malaysia, Hong Kong) Thai (Thailand) Indonesian (Indonesia) Malay (Malaysia) Vietnamese (Vietnam)
- Picture format: 1080i HDTV

Ownership
- Owner: HBO Asia Pte Ltd (Skydance Corporation)
- Sister channels: Warner TV; HBO; Cartoon Network Asia; Cartoonito Asia; CNN International; HBO Signature; HBO Hits; HBO Family

History
- Launched: November 15, 1996; 29 years ago
- Replaced: FOX Action Movies (Cignal TV channel space)
- Closed: 1 January 2017; 9 years ago (Truevisions); 12 May 2023; 3 years ago (MNC Vision); 1 December 2025; 11 months ago (Sky Cable)
- Former names: Max (29 March 2009–30 September 2012); Max by HBO (1 March 2017–1 May 2020, in Vietnam only)

Availability

Terrestrial
- IndiHome (Indonesia): Channel 803 (HD)
- Cignal TV (Philippines): Channel 212 (HD)
- StarHub TV (Singapore): Channel 611 (HD)
- SatLite (Philippines): Channel 70
- Singtel TV (Singapore): Channel 424 (HD)

Cinemax Asia is a pan-Asian pay television channel. Part of the HBO Asia network, it features action, science-fiction, thriller, and adult comedy films. Cinemax Asia is headquartered in Warner Bros Discovery Asia office in Singapore.

== History ==
=== Cinemax Asia (15 November 1996–28 March 2009) ===
Cinemax Asia (a secondary channel of HBO Asia) was launched on 15 November 1996. It was a 24-hour movie channel which featured movies in horror, suspense, thriller and action. Cinemax Asia featured Thriller Cinemax on Thursdays, Action Cinemax on Fridays and Cinemax Superstars on weekends.

In Malaysia, Cinemax Asia was launched on the Astro channel number 18, on 23 April 1998 at 7:45 pm replacing the ill-fated MGM Gold channel on 6 April 1998. In Singapore, it was added to Singapore Cable Vision on 1 April 1997. At the time, the channel had a complementary offer to HBO, with "thought-provoking movies of critical acclaim" and foreign feature films, all in English.

=== Max Asia (29 March 2009–30 September 2012) ===
In March 2009, Cinemax Asia was rebranded as "Max Asia" to appeal to male viewers. Max Asia's logo was redesigned as well in line with the rebranding. Under registered permission HBO Network, Max Asia became an American movies channel.

=== Cinemax Asia (1 October 2012–present) ===
On October 1, 2012, Max Asia reverted to Cinemax Asia. Cinemax Asia had a yellow background colour, but was replaced by a red colour in 2016 with a more bolder approach to match its original American counterpart, with new action and thriller movies. In Vietnam, Cinemax was rebranded as "Max by HBO" from 1 March 2017 to 1 May 2020.

During October 2021, Cinemax Asia featured horror films in a Maximum Horror promotion.

== Logo ==
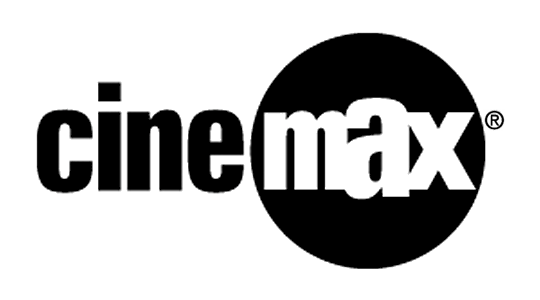
Logo used in 2003–2008

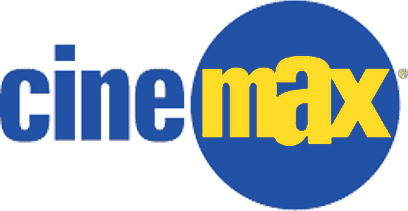
Logo used in 2008–2009

Logo used in 2009–2012 after rebranded

Logo used in 2012–2016

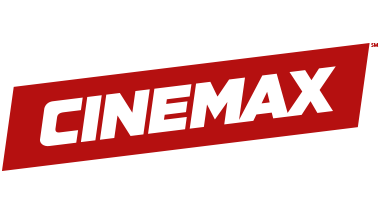
Logo used in 2017–present (2020–present in Vietnam)

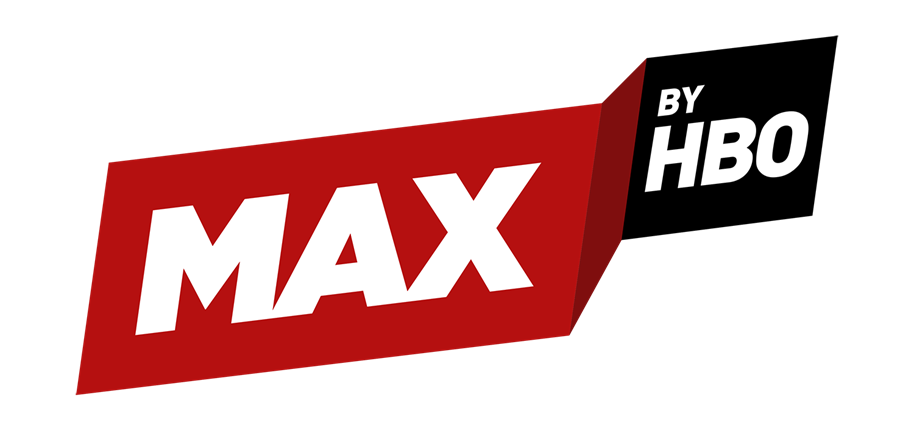
MAX By HBO logo (2017–2020, in Vietnam only)

== See also ==
- HBO
  - HBO Asia
- Cinemax
- Red by HBO
