= HBO Family (Asia) =

Asian multiplex channel

- Current logo, which is a revision of 2006 logo, used since 2013.
- Country: Singapore
- Broadcast area: East Asia, Southeast Asia
- Network: HBO
- Headquarters: 151 Lorong Chuan, New Tech Park 04–05, Singapore

Programming
- Language: English
- Picture format: 1080i HDTV

Ownership
- Owner: HBO Asia Pte Ltd (Home Box Office, Inc.) (Skydance Corporation)
- Sister channels: Cartoonito; Cartoon Network; Cinemax; HBO; HBO Signature; HBO Hits

History
- Launched: 16 March 2006; 20 years ago 15 September 2021; 5 years ago (Malaysia); 1 December 2021; 4 years ago (Brunei)
- Replaced: FOX Movies HD (Cignal TV channel space)
- Closed: 1 January 2017; 9 years ago (Truevisions); 12 May 2023; 3 years ago (MNC Vision); 1 December 2025; 11 months ago (Sky Cable)

Links
- Website: Official website

Availability

Terrestrial
- Cignal TV (Philippines): Channel 211 (HD)
- StarHub TV (Singapore): Channel 604 (HD)
- Singtel TV (Singapore): Channel 422 (HD)

Streaming media
- HBO Max: Watch live
- Astro (Malaysia): Astro GO

HBO Family is a Southeast Asian pay television channel owned by HBO Asia, launched on 16 March 2006, together with HBO Hits. It features children's programming, comedy, family and drama films.

Following the closure of the U.S. feed on 15 August 2025, the Asian and Latin American feeds are the only HBO Family feeds outside of the U.S.

== Programming ==
=== Info Programming ===
HBO Family Asia has licensing deals with 5 major Hollywood conglomerate film studios:

- Warner Bros. Discovery (Warner Bros. Pictures, New Line Cinema, HBO Films, Castle Rock Entertainment, Warner Independent Pictures)
- Paramount Skydance (Paramount Pictures, Paramount Vantage)
- NBCUniversal (Universal Pictures)
- Sony Pictures
- Independent Film Productions such as Lionsgate Films, Regency Enterprises, Metro-Goldwyn-Mayer, A24, etc.
