= HBO Hits (Asia) =

Asian multiplex channel

- Country: Singapore
- Broadcast area: Asia
- Network: HBO
- Headquarters: 151 Lorong Chuan, New Tech Park 04–05, Singapore

Programming
- Languages: English; Hindi (formerly)
- Picture format: 1080i HDTV

Ownership
- Owner: HBO Asia Pte Ltd (Skydance Corporation)
- Sister channels: Warner TV; Cinemax; HBO; Cartoonito; Cartoon Network; CNN International; HBO Signature; HBO Family

History
- Launched: 16 March 2006; 20 years ago 15 September 2021; 5 years ago (Malaysia); 1 December 2021; 4 years ago (Brunei)
- Closed: 1 January 2017; 9 years ago (Truevisions); 12 May 2023; 3 years ago (MNC Vision); 1 December 2025; 10 months ago (Sky Cable); 1 March 2026; 7 months ago (Astro Malaysia)

Links
- Website: Official website

Availability

Terrestrial
- Cignal TV (Philippines): Channel 54 (SD); Channel 214 (HD)
- StarHub TV (Singapore): Channel 605 (HD)
- SatLite (Philippines): Channel 77
- Singtel TV (Singapore): Channel 423 (HD)

Streaming media
- HBO Go: Watch live
- Astro (Malaysia): Astro GO

HBO Hits is a Southeast Asian multiplex channel owned by HBO Asia, launched on 16 March 2006, which features Hollywood blockbuster movies of various genres.

A U.S. feed launched on September 4, 2025, replacing HBO 2.

== Programming ==
HBO Hits Asia has licensing deals with 5 major Hollywood conglomerate film studios:

- Warner Bros. Discovery (Warner Bros. Pictures, New Line Cinema, HBO Films, Castle Rock Entertainment, Warner Independent Pictures)
- Paramount Skydance (Paramount Pictures, Paramount Vantage)
- NBCUniversal (Universal Pictures)
- Sony Pictures
- Independent Film Productions such as Lionsgate Films, Regency Enterprises, Metro-Goldwyn-Mayer, A24, etc.

== See also ==
- HBO 2
