= HBO Go =

Subscription video on demand service

- Founded: February 18, 2010; 16 years ago
- Dissolved: July 31, 2020; 6 years ago (United States); June 29, 2021; 5 years ago (Latin America and the Caribbean); March 8, 2022; 4 years ago (Central and Eastern Europe); November 19, 2024; 23 months ago (Most of Asia-Pacific countries); June 16, 2026; 4 months ago (Vietnam)
- Predecessor: HBO on Broadband
- Successor: HBO Max
- Headquarters: New York, New York, United States
- Parent: Home Box Office, Inc.
- Registration: Required
- Launched: February 18, 2010; 16 years ago
- Current status: Closed

HBO Go was an American-based global authenticated video-on-demand streaming service of the pay television network HBO. Launched on February 18, 2010 in the United States, the service allowed subscribers to access HBO's on-demand programming via the HBO website, mobile apps, and digital media players, among other devices, through their television providers. After the launch of HBO Max in May 2020, HBO Go, along with HBO Now, were replaced by the succeeding service in all regions; Vietnam, the last market where HBO Go remained active, replaced the service with HBO Max on June 16, 2026, effectively discontinuing HBO Go.

== History ==
HBO Go was the successor to HBO on Broadband, a service launched in January 2008, exclusively for Time Warner Cable (then a division of HBO parent company Time Warner) customers in Green Bay and Milwaukee, Wisconsin. HBO on Broadband offered 400 hours of content, including feature films, HBO original movies, specials, and series, at no extra charge for subscribers. Access required both a subscription to HBO and Time Warner Cable's Roadrunner internet service.

On February 18, 2010, HBO Go was launched, initially available through Verizon Fios. Within the first week, the application was downloaded over one million times, and by June 2011, it reached three million. At launch, HBO Go was only available on computers through the HBO website. iOS and Android applications were released on April 29, 2011. Over the following years, the service expanded to other providers, including AT&T U-verse, Comcast, Cox Communications, Time Warner Cable, DirecTV, Dish Network, Suddenlink Communications, Charter Communications, and virtual MVPD services such as DirecTV Now and Hulu.

In October 2011, Roku became the first television-connected device to support HBO Go, it later became available on Apple TV, Chromecast, PlayStation, Samsung Smart TVs, and Xbox. Support for devices was subject to cable provider agreements. In January 2019, HBO Go ended support for PlayStation 3, Xbox 360, and Samsung Smart TVs manufactured before 2013.

On June 12, 2020, it was announced that HBO Go would be discontinued in the United States on July 31, 2020, in favor of HBO Max. HBO Now, a separate direct-to-consumer version of the HBO service, was also replaced by HBO Max at launch for most subscribers.

Warner Bros. Discovery continued to use the HBO Go branding for services in eight Southeast Asian markets. Although they initially planned to relaunch these services as HBO Max in 2022, the launch was postponed. The services in these markets, along with Discovery+, were rebranded to Max on November 19, 2024. The service in Vietnam was also replaced by HBO Max on June 16, 2026.

== Content ==
HBO Go offered a selection of theatrically released films from studios with distribution deals with HBO, including 20th Century Fox, Universal Pictures, and Warner Bros. Pictures, its sister company. A significant number of titles were added and removed from the service each month.

HBO original series were available on a permanent basis, with new episodes typically becoming available for streaming at the time of their initial broadcast in the United States' Eastern Time Zone on the linear HBO channel.

Several older HBO series were not available on HBO Go, including Tales from the Crypt, Tenacious D, 1st & Ten, Da Ali G Show, and The Ricky Gervais Show. The Larry Sanders Show and Arliss were not added until 2016 and 2018, respectively. HBO Go did not provide live streams of HBO's linear channels, though programming was made available following its airing on the network.

== Platforms ==
- Amazon Fire TV (December 16, 2014)
- Android (April 29, 2011)
- Android TV (February 18, 2010)
- iOS (April 29, 2011)
- Apple TV (June 19, 2013)
- Google Chromecast (November 22, 2013)
- LG webOS (March 20, 2019)
- Mola (September 5, 2020)
- PlayStation 4 (March 3, 2015)
- Roku streaming players (October 11, 2011)
- Samsung Smart TVs, manufactured 2013 or later (February 17, 2012)
- TiVo (February 16, 2016)
- Xbox One (November 20, 2014)
