= Acquisition of Time Warner by AT&T =

2016 to 2018 business transaction

- Logos before the acquisition

- Logo after the acquisition
- Initiator: AT&T Inc.
- Target: Time Warner
- Type: Vertical merger
- Cost: US$85.4 billion, equivalent to $115.5 billion in 2026; (equity value alone); US$108.7 billion, equivalent to $146.8 billion in 2026 (assumed debt included)
- Initiated: October 22, 2016; 10 years ago
- Completed: June 14, 2018; 8 years ago
- Resulting entity: Time Warner is renamed to WarnerMedia and turned into a subsidiary of AT&T.
- Status: Closed

AT&T first announced its cash-and-stock acquisition of Time Warner on October 22, 2016. As part of their definitive agreement, AT&T would acquire Time Warner for $85.4 billion and assume the company's debt obligations for $23.3 billion, corresponding to a total amount of the transaction of $108.7 billion. Time Warner shareholders were issued up to $101.73 per share by AT&T. (Note: The initial per share agreement was $107.50 per share, but fluctuations in AT&T's share price led to the collar mechanism being used, which lowered the final pricing to $101.73 per share.) The deal between the two companies was structured as a tax-free vertical merger. (Note: Shareholders were issued exactly 1.437 of AT&T common stock and $53.75 in cash components for every share of Time Warner owned.)

At the time of the merger's announcement, AT&T was the world's largest telecommunications company, and the biggest pay TV distributor in the United States after completing its purchase of DirecTV. Wanting to diversify into entertainment, AT&T began considering several M&A deals before finalizing its agreement with Time Warner. To finance the transaction, AT&T signed a $40 billion unsecured bridge loan with Bank of America and JPMorgan. Early reactions to the proposed deal were mostly negative, as many advocacy groups, regulatory agencies, and politicians voiced concerns about the merger. Criticism centered on the level of market concentration AT&T would gain and whether it would raise subscription fees or withhold content from competitors. This led the Justice Department to sue AT&T on November 20, 2017, in what would become the first federal attempt to break apart a vertical merger in nearly 40 years.

United States v. AT&T was often described as the "Antitrust Trial of the Century" and lasted for six weeks from March to June 2018. The U.S. District Judge Richard J. Leon oversaw the trial and ruled on June 12, 2018, that the Department of Justice (DOJ) had failed to provide substantial evidence of how the merger would impact consumers. The merger closed on June 14, 2018, with Time Warner being privately reorganized into AT&T as WarnerMedia, LLC. The DOJ continued its legal battle with AT&T until 2019, when the Circuit Courts upheld Judge Leon's ruling. AT&T's involvement with entertainment only lasted a few years, as it began unwinding its participating interests in media to bring down debt. By May 17, 2021, an agreement was reached with Discovery, Inc. to spin off WarnerMedia and have it merged to form Warner Bros. Discovery through a Reverse Morris Trust, with the transaction closing on April 8, 2022.

== Background ==
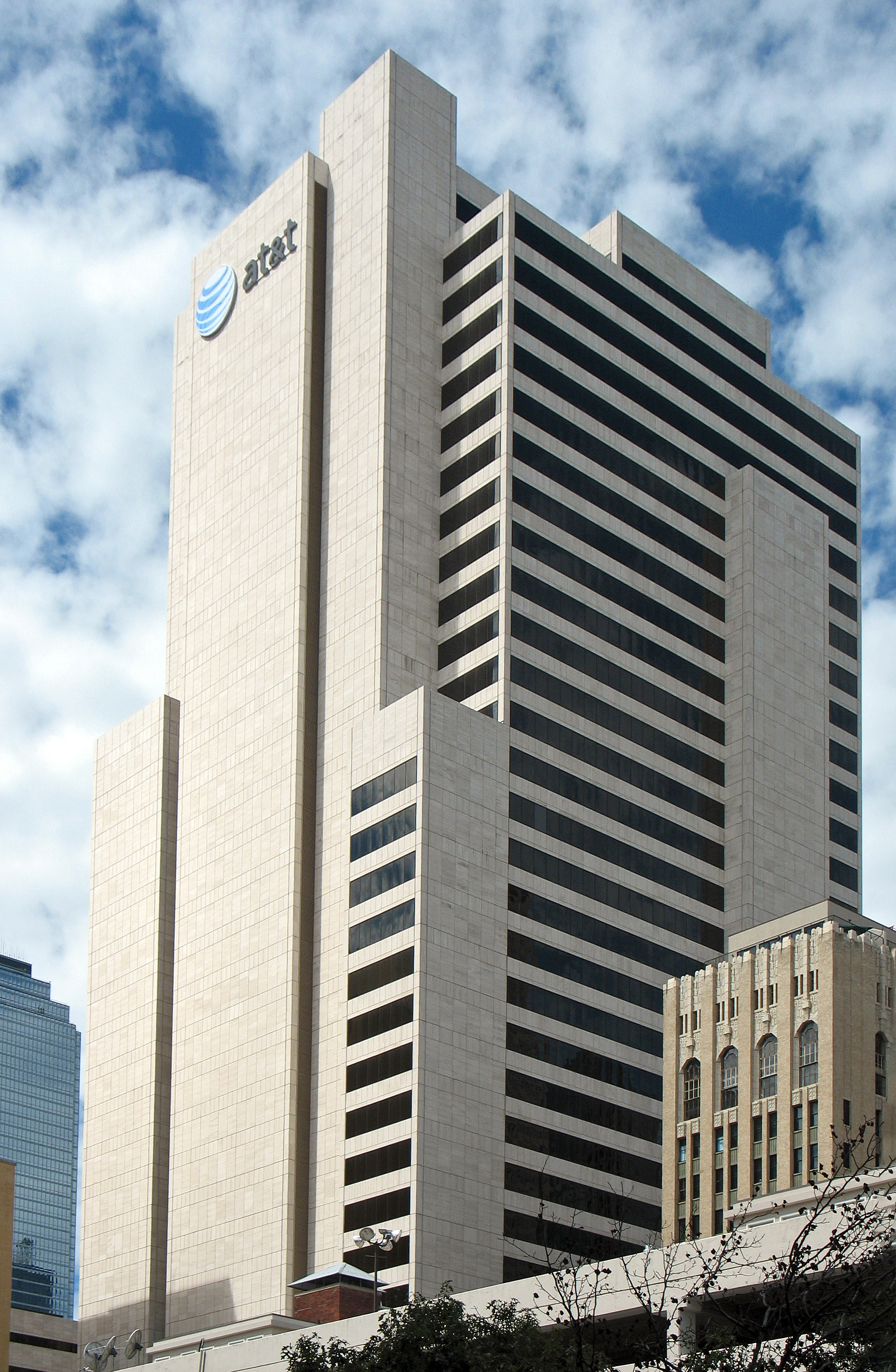
AT&T's Whitacre Tower (located in Dallas, Texas)

=== AT&T's historical outline ===
The first company to bear the name "AT&T" was founded on March 5, 1885, when the American Bell Company established the American Telephone and Telegraph Company (later renamed AT&T Corporation) to develop the first long-distance telephone network. Due to existing Massachusetts corporate law, American Bell merged into AT&T on December 30, 1899, making AT&T the new corporate parent of Western Electric, the Bell System, and various international properties. Under the leadership of Theodore Newton Vail, AT&T adopted the motto of "One Policy, One System, Universal Service," which came to define the company's early history. In the early 1900s, AT&T grew by acquiring dozens of telephone companies and blocking competitors from connecting to its long-distance network. The U.S. Department of Justice tried to break apart AT&T through the Sherman Antitrust Act but later reached a settlement through the Kingsbury Commitment in 1913, helping AT&T avoid being federally broken up like Standard Oil and the American Tobacco Company. The Willis Graham Act of 1921 guaranteed AT&T as a federally regulated, natural monopoly.

By 1932, AT&T controlled over 80% of telephone operations in the United States, and by the mid-20th Century, AT&T was the world's largest telecommunications company, with a market capitalization exceeding that of General Motors and IBM. AT&T's unrivaled dominance in telephone operations led to it often being nicknamed "Ma Bell." On November 20, 1974, the Department of Justice sued AT&T for antitrust violations and accused the company of violating the Sherman Antitrust Act and monopolizing telecommunications service within the United States. Defendants of the suit included AT&T, Western Electric and Bell Laboratories. The case cited AT&T with more than $67 billion in assets, supplying over 80% of telephone equipment, and handling over 90% of interstate telephone calls. The court trial lasted for nearly eight years and required AT&T to seek a divestiture of either its long-lines division or the Bell System. On January 8, 1982, AT&T reached a settlement to have the Bell System be separated into seven regional operating companies while Western Electric and Bell Laboratories were consolidated into AT&T Technologies. These changes took effect on January 1, 1984, resulting in an altered telecommunications landscape.

After the breakup, AT&T ventured into computing by acquiring NCR Corporation in 1991 but later spun it off in 1996. Wanting stronger positions in cellular connectivity and cable operations, AT&T purchased MediaOne, McCaw Cellular Communications, and Tele-Communications between 1994 and 2000. Heavy debt from these acquisitions led to the spinoff of AT&T Wireless Services and AT&T Broadband as separate companies. With its future uncertain, AT&T was acquired on November 18, 2005, by SBC Communications, one of its former Baby Bell companies. SBC emerged in 1984 as the smallest Baby Bell and expanded rapidly due to relaxed telecom regulations from the 1996 Telecom Act, which allowed it to acquire several Baby Bells. After merging with AT&T Corporation, SBC adopted the AT&T name and reincorporated as AT&T Inc. Following its 2006 acquisition of BellSouth, AT&T reunited four of the seven Baby Bells and gained full control of Cingular Wireless. After Edward Whitacre Jr. retired in June 2007, Randall Stephenson became AT&T's CEO and chairman. In his first year as CEO, AT&T's U-Verse platform—a triple-play bundle offering IP television, high-speed internet, and VoIP home phone service reached one million subscribers. AT&T also secured the first carrier deal for Apple's original iPhone, which increased customers at AT&T Mobility.

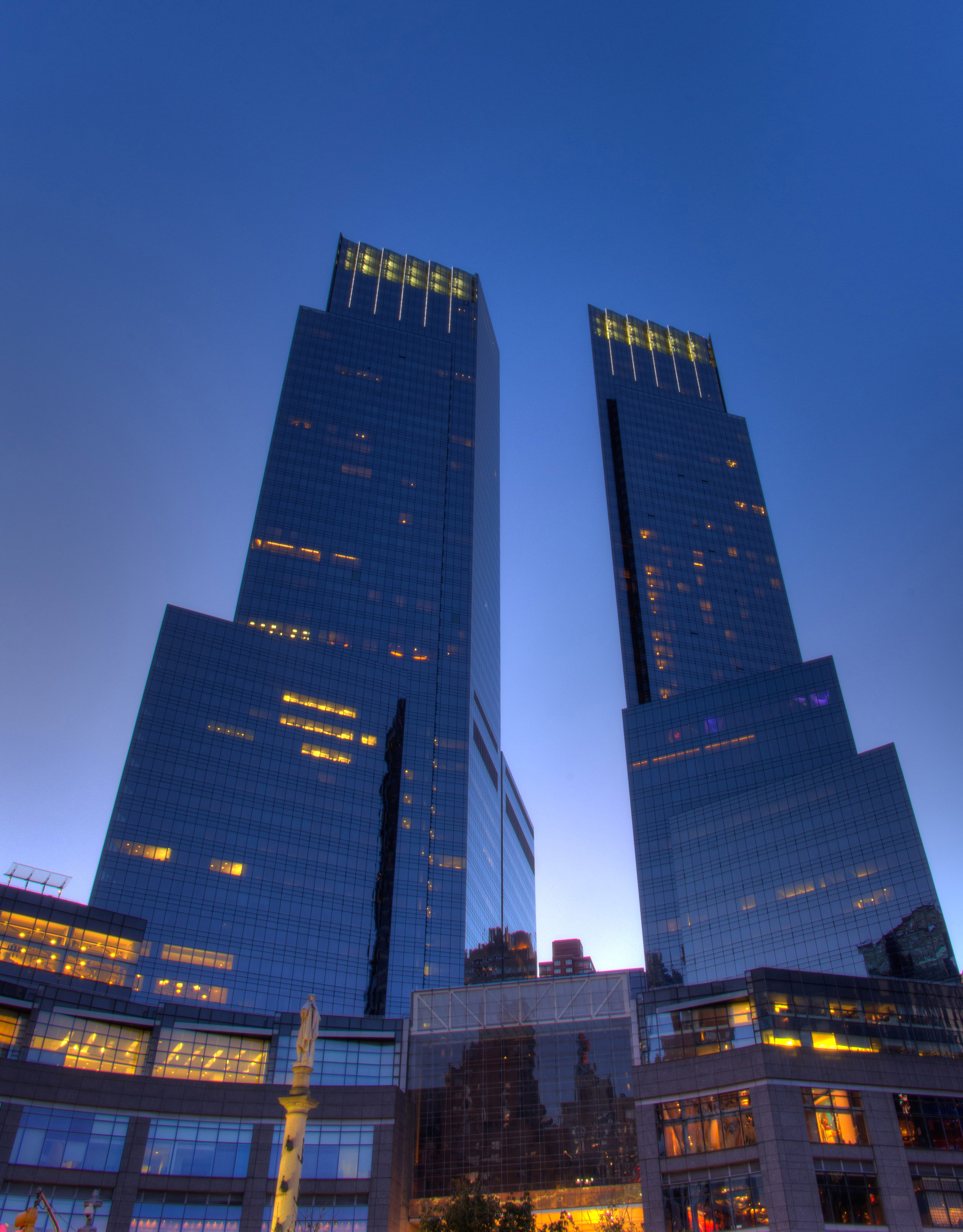
One Columbus Circle, officially called the Deutsche Bank Center which was Time Warner's headquarters from 2004 to 2019.

==== Time Warner's corporate outline ====
Time Warner began its operations on January 10, 1990, from the merger between Time Inc. and Warner Communications. Henry Luce and Briton Hadden co-founded Time Inc. on November 22, 1922, and the namesake Time magazine began publishing in 1923. As Time Inc. grew, it launched or acquired dozens of magazine titles, such as People, Life, and Sports Illustrated. By the mid-1960s, Time Inc. was the largest magazine company, and it held interests in book publishing and paper manufacturing. Time spearheaded the launch of HBO in 1972, which pioneered premium television. Warner Communications was established on December 26, 1961, as Kinney Service Co., the holding company for tertiary businesses, such as the Riverside Memorial Chapels and Kinney Parking System. Steven Ross was the company's CEO and Chairman, and he led the conglomerate's push into entertainment through the acquisitions of National Periodical Publications and Warner Bros-Seven Arts in the late 1960s. Kinney Services' reincorporated as Warner Communications on February 10, 1972, while its non-core businesses became National Kinney Corp.

Warner Communications formed Warner Cable in 1973 and launched the Warner-Amex joint venture with American Express. A multitude of cable networks were formed, but financial losses led to the business being sold to Gulf+Western in 1985. After several rounds of merger discussions, Time Inc. and Warner Communications entered into a stock-swap merger on March 4, 1989, to form the world's largest media conglomerate. Paramount Communications, the successor to Gulf+Western, contested the merger and attempted a hostile takeover of Time Inc. After being rejected, Paramount sued Time to block the merger, but the Delaware Courts ruled in Time's favor and allowed the merger to close. After the merger concluded in January 1990, Steve Ross and Nicholas J Nicholas became the Co-CEOs of Time Warner. Immediate issues facing the company were its high debt burden. To address this, a limited partnership named Time Warner Entertainment was created in 1992. Partners in the venture included Toshiba and US West. After Nicholas Jr. resigned in May 1992 and Steve Ross died later that year, Gerald Levin, a longtime Time Inc. executive, assumed the roles of Chairman and CEO.

During Levin's ten-year tenure as CEO, Time Warner oversaw the acquisition of the Atlanta-based Turner Broadcasting System, which added a variety of new assets to the company. These properties included New Line Cinema, Castle Rock Entertainment, and cable networks like CNN and TBS. A transformative event in Time Warner's history was its unsuccessful merger with America Online, which later became infamous for becoming one of the worst business mergers in history. AOL Time Warner, as the company was called, was supposed to be a combination of traditional and digital media, but the expected synergies between both companies failed to materialize. Challenges facing the conglomerate were the collapse of the dot-com bubble, corporate culture clashes, and heavy losses. Over $200 billion in shareholder value was erased and by January 2003, AOL Time Warner announced an annual loss of nearly $100 billion. On October 16, 2003, AOL Time Warner was officially renamed back to Time Warner and the AOL subsidiary was spun off as an independent company on December 9, 2009, bringing an end to one of the most tumultuous mergers in history.

== Acquisition developments ==
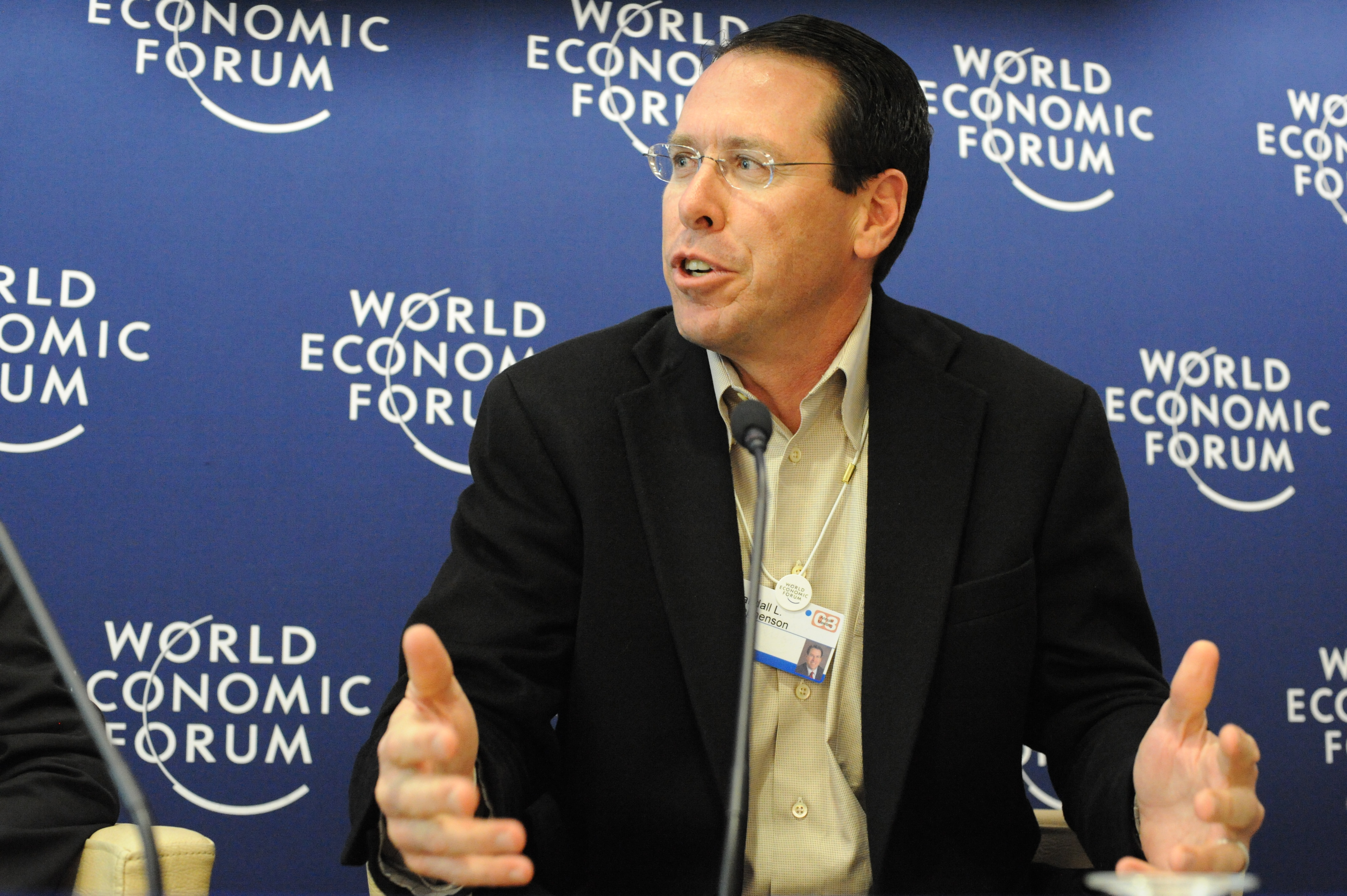
Randall Stephenson, AT&T's chairman from 2007 to 2021 and Chief Executive from 2007 to 2020.

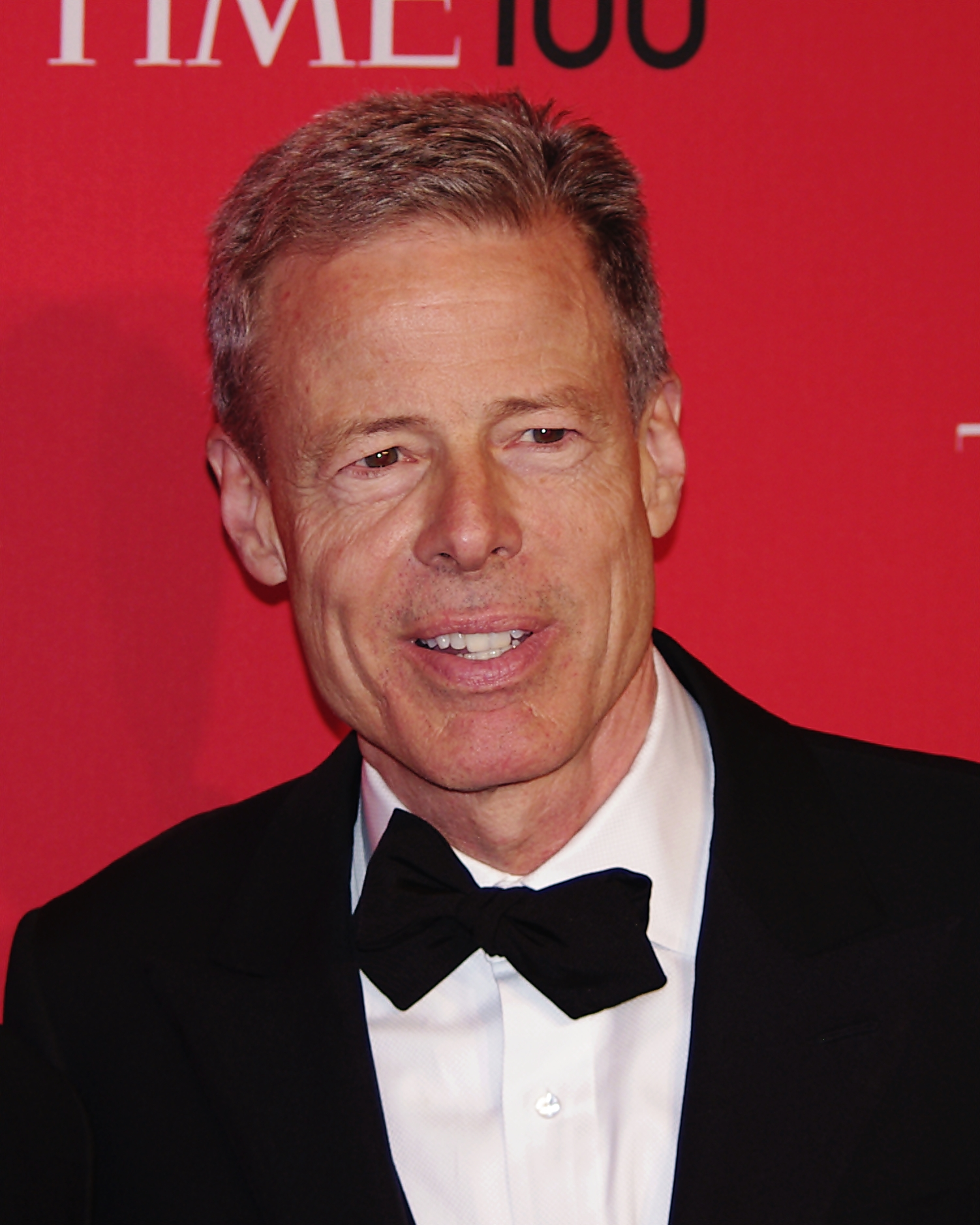
Jeff Bewkes, Time Warner's former chairman and CEO

=== Prelude and early negotiations ===
Jeff Bewkes succeeded Dick Parsons as Time Warner's CEO and chairman in 2008 and he aimed to restore investor confidence in Time Warner's stagnant stock price through spinning off Time Warner Cable and AOL. Once the divestitures were completed, Time Warner's nearly 18-year run as the world's largest media conglomerate came to an end. On September 28, 2010, Bewkes was interviewed by The Daily Telegraph, and he referred to the AOL Time Warner merger as the "biggest mistake in corporate history." On December 12, 2010, Jeff Bewkes commented on Netflix during an interview with The New York Times and he dismissed the streaming company as a fading star, equating its disruption to traditional media companies as being that of the Albanian Land Forces, jokingly saying, "Is the Albanian army going to take over the world soon?" Once AT&T's exclusive wireless deal with Apple ended in 2011, rival competitors like Verizon and Sprint quickly began attracting mobile customers. Wanting to grow its market share in the wireless market, AT&T reached a deal to acquire T-Mobile USA from Deutsche Telekom, but the proposed merger faced heavy opposition and was ultimately blocked by the U.S. Department of Justice.

AT&T paid a $3 billion breakup fee and transferred over $1 billion worth of wireless spectrum. Those resources transformed T-Mobile from a struggling carrier into a leading telecom force with its successful Un-carrier campaign. Despite the legal setbacks, Randall Stephenson said AT&T would continue to be aggressive in leading the mobile internet revolution. Despite huge investments in 4G LTE networks by AT&T and other wireless carriers, Big Tech companies such as Apple, Google, Amazon, and Netflix made big profits by creating apps and services that took advantage of faster data speeds, all riding on the networks built by the telecom giants. This led AT&T to pursue an alternative strategy by shifting towards satellite television. On May 18, 2014, AT&T announced its proposed purchase of the DirecTV Group, which was structured as a $67.1 billion cash-and-stock deal. The transaction occurred concurrently with Comcast's attempted acquisition of Time Warner Cable, which went unsuccessfully. Despite opposition from some advocacy groups, the acquisition closed within 14 months, with the Federal Communications Commission approving the deal on July 24, 2015. (Note: DirecTV shareholders were issued up to $28.50 in cash and 1.892 shares of AT&T stock per share.) DirecTV was immediately brought under AT&T Entertainment Group, a new subdivision headed by John Stankey, a longtime AT&T executive. With over 20 million DirecTV subscribers and nearly six million U-Verse subscribers, AT&T boasted a combined Pay-Tv base of 25 million customers, making it the largest provider of pay television for the next several years. Randall Stephenson described AT&T as a fundamentally different company and stated it would benefit consumers. After spinning off Time Inc. in early 2014, Time Warner became an acquisition target of several Fortune 500 companies.

21st Century Fox launched an $80 billion unsolicited offer to acquire Time Warner on July 16, 2014, but withdrew within a month. Eddy Cue, a senior Apple executive, suggested acquiring Time Warner, but the talks never advanced enough to warrant meetings between Tim Cook and Jeff Bewkes. By early 2016, AT&T became interested in acquiring a media company and unsuccessfully bided for Yahoo Inc. Stephenson held talks with Shari Redstone about potentially acquiring CBS Corporation from National Amusements but later withdrew. In August 2016, Stephenson and Peter Chernin attended a dinner at Martha's Vineyard and spoke about changes in the media landscape. (Note: Peter, a former News Corp executive, worked with AT&T through his company TCG to establish Otter Media on April 22, 2014.) Peter informed Stephenson of the immense value of Time Warner's properties and suggested AT&T acquire the company. Stephenson met with Jeff Bewkes at One Columbus Circle in New York City, and the two came in agreement over shifting consumer patterns and started the merger process between their companies. To maintain confidentiality, codenames were used, and only a small circle of bankers and executives knew of the merger. (Note: The respective codenames were "Lily" for AT&T and "Rabbit" for Time Warner.) Around this time, Bob Iger, Disney's CEO, spoke with Jeff Bewkes about potentially merging their companies, but those proposals were declined as existing agreements with AT&T were already underway. Rumors of AT&T's merger ambitions began circulating in September 2016 and by October 20, 2016, reports indicated that the telecom giant was in advance talks to acquire Time Warner. It was not until October 22, 2016, that both companies publicly announced their merger. Jeff Bewkes described the merger as a "natural fit between two companies with great legacies of innovation in communications and media.''

=== Mainstream reactions/responses ===
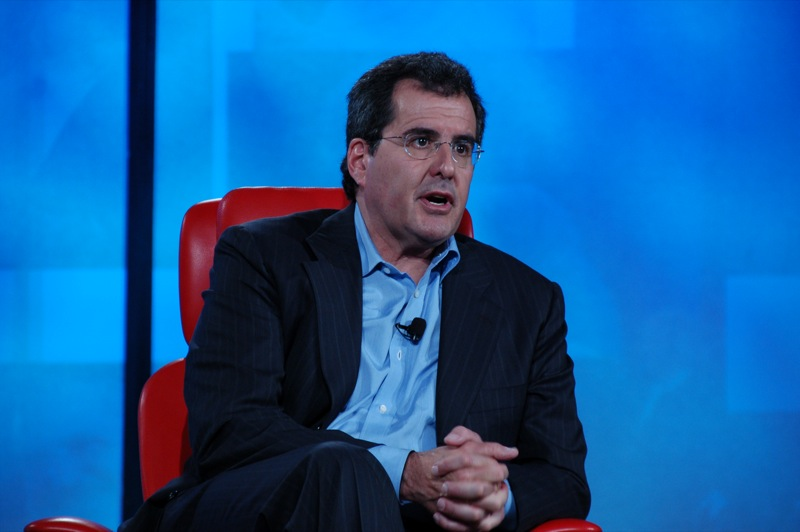
Peter Chernin, CEO of TCG Capital, former President of News Corp, and cofounder of Otter Media

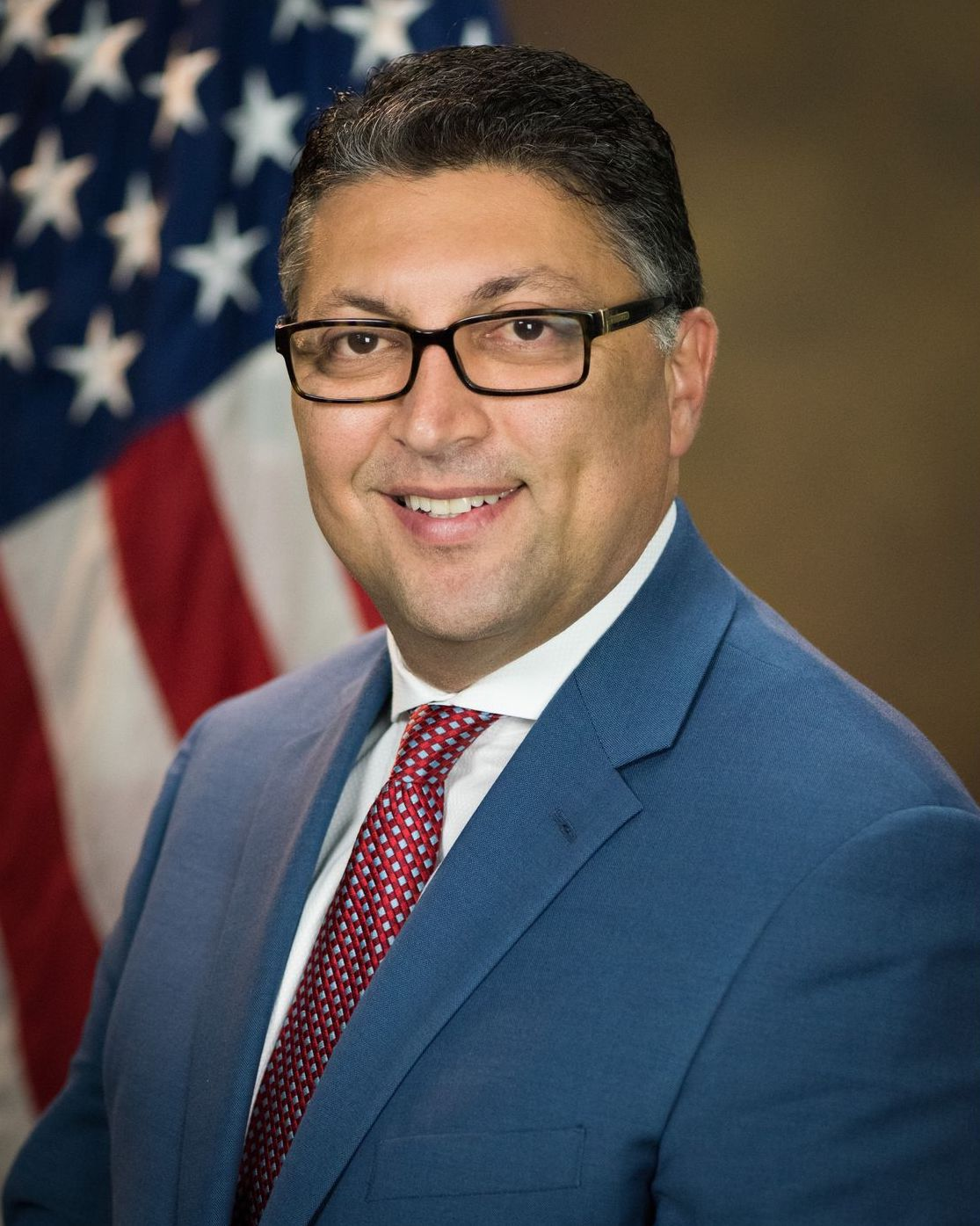
Makan Delrahim, former Assistant Attorney General

AT&T's merger with Time Warner was structured as a cash-and-stock acquisition, with Time Warner shareholders set to receive a combination of cash and AT&T common stock valued at up to $107.50 per share. Perella Weinberg served as the financial advisor to AT&T, while J.P. Morgan Chase and Bank of America's Merrill Lynch facilitated financing through a $40 billion unsecured loan. Time Warner received advisory support from Citigroup, Allen & Co., and Morgan Stanley. The high-profile transaction was anticipated to close at some point in 2017. If either company were to withdraw from the merger, AT&T would pay $500 million or Time Warner would pay $1.7 billion breakup fee. Peter Chernin was credited by Randall Stephenson as being the driving force behind the idea to merge the companies. and despite reports that Chernin would end up assuming a senior role in AT&T after the merger, he continued to lead TCG Capital. The announcement to AT&T's purchase of Time Warner was met with skepticism and reluctance. Prevalent concerns were that the acquisition would trigger a domino effect of megamergers, with analysts like Michael Morris, Tim Nollen, and Rich Greenfield believing the deal could set off a new wave of media consolidation.

Zenia Mucha and Julie Henderson, both of whom were PR Directors at 21st Century Fox and the Walt Disney Company, issued statements saying the acquisition needed to be subjected to maximum scrutiny. Research firms like MoffetNathanson described the deal as a necessary form of old-fashioned diversification but gave it a 50/50 chance of completion, due to growing regulatory scrutiny. Business news outlets like the Wall Street Journal, Bloomberg, and Fortune expressed doubts about the merger's and many investors believed AT&T was overpaying, The merger was frequently compared with the troubled AOL Time Warner merger and Steve Case, an AOL cofounder, reflected on the merger and cautioned AT&T to avoid repeating past mistakes. It was also estimated that the acquisition could leave AT&T with nearly $200 in debt. 21st Century Fox issued a statement, saying it was not interested in rebidding for Time Warner. With the merger's announcement occurring just weeks before the 2016 Presidential Election, the presidential campaigns of Donald Trump and Hillary Clinton issued immediate responses to the transaction. Peter Navarro, the Trump campaign's economic advisor, referred to the AT&T/Time Warner merger as an oligopolistic realignment of the American media and referred to AT&T as the original Ma Bell monopoly. Tim Kaine, the Clinton campaign's vice presidential nominee, expressed concern about the merger. While Clinton never publicly commented on the merger, Trump spoke about it at his rally and stated its "a deal we will not approve in my administration because it's too much concentration of power in the hands of too few." Senators Mike Lee and Amy Klobuchar, the co-chairs of the Senate Judiciary Subcommittee on Antitrust, released a joint statement on October 24, 2016, saying "An acquisition of Time Warner by AT&T would potentially raise significant antitrust issues, which the subcommittee would carefully examine."

Prominent congressmen who were heavily critical of the merger included Bernie Sanders, Chuck Grassley, Al Franken, and Elizabeth Warren. The subcommittee invited the CEOs of AT&T and Time Warner for a Congressional hearing at the U.S. Capitol for a December 2016 date. Due to the naming confusion between Time Warner and Time Warner Cable, Robert D. Marcus was mistakenly listed as an invitee instead of Bewkes. Stephenson responded to growing antitrust concerns and reiterated that the merger would not eliminate competition. On November 6, 2016, Donald Trump won the presidential election against Hillary Clinton, and upon becoming president-elect, renewed thought emerged over whether the incoming Trump administration would follow through on blocking the acquisition. Telecom analyst Doug Barke noted that "Trump was quite clear in his distaste for the merger and no doubt the odds of its successful completion are lower this morning than yesterday." Stephenson and Bewkes appeared at the Subcommittee Hearing on December 7, 2016, to explain their merger rationale and answer questions from congressmen. Present at the hearing were Mark Cuban, who defended the merger and stated it would provide better competition against Big Tech companies like Google and Facebook, while Gene Kimmelman, President of Public Knowledge, cautioned against the merger, saying it would lead to higher costs and fewer choices for consumers. Several days before Trump's first inauguration, Stephenson and several AT&T executives met with Trump to discuss relevant American issues like job creation and tax reform, but the ongoing merger was not discussed. Stephenson went into greater detail about the discussion with the Wall Street Journal's Matt Murray on January 17, 2017. Upon being inaugurated as President, Trump appointed Ajit Pai as Federal Communications Commission Chairman.

== Regulatory approval and court trial ==
Country	Commission or Governing Agency	Status
European Union	The European Commission (EC)	Approved on March 16, 2017
Mexico	Federal Telecommunications Institute (IFT) and Federal Economic Competition Commission (COFECE)	Approved on August 22, 2017
Brazil	Administrative Council for Economic Defense/Conselho Administrativo de Defesa Econômica (CADE)	Approved on October 24, 2017
Chile	National competition authority in Chile/Fiscalía Nacional Económica (FNE)	Approved on September 5, 2017
United States	Federal Communications Commission and Department of Justice	Approval delayed due to legal action. Courts granted approval on June 14, 2018, and later guaranteed on February 20, 2019

Time Warner shareholders voted to approve AT&T's takeover on February 15, 2017. Ajit Pai passed the reviewing decision of the ongoing AT&T/Time Warner merger from the Federal Communications Commission to the Department of Justice on February 28, 2017. The European Commission approved AT&T's acquisition on March 16, 2017. John Stankey, then the head of AT&T's Entertainment Group, was named the next CEO of Time Warner on July 14, 2017. While being interviewed by The Hollywood Reporter, Stankey promised that AT&T would respect Time Warner's Hollywood-driven culture. Mexican Regulators approved AT&T's takeover on August 22, 2017, while Brazilian regulators, despite expressing some concerns over AT&T's growing media properties, approved the takeover on October 24, 2017. Randall Stephenson and Makan Delrahim, the Assistant Attorney General for the DOJ's antitrust division, met on November 8, 2017, to discuss AT&T potentially selling DirecTV or Turner Broascasting to clear regulatory hurdles. However, the Justice Department would later sue AT&T on November 20, 2017, to block the merger. The lawsuit, United States V. AT&T, marked the second legal battle between AT&T and the DOJ, following AT&T's unsuccessful bid for T-Mobile in 2011, and the most significant dispute between the parties since the Bell System breakup. It was also the biggest antitrust dispute since the Justice Department's attempt to breakup Microsoft in 2001 and marked the first time in decades that the DOJ attempted to break apart a vertical merger.

=== Conflicts with Justice Department ===
In his first response to the merger since taking office, President Trump stated "I've always felt that was a deal that's not good for the country.'' Many on Wall Street were surprised by the lawsuit, as the Justice Department previously approved the Comcast/NBCUniversal merger and conspiracies started arising over the lawsuit secretly being politically motivated due to CNN's coverage of the Trump administration. Jeff Bewkes rejected these sentiments and believed there was no political involvement. AT&T described the lawsuit as being a "radical and inexplicable departure from decades of antitrust precedent.'' The Justice Department stated the merger would greatly harm American consumer and the Consumer Federation of America supported blocking the merger, describing it as one of the most damaging vertical mergers in recent history. Settlement talks between AT&T and the DOJ failed by December 19, 2017, and the court trial was scheduled to begin in March 2018. If the DOJ won, AT&T would either withdraw its bid to acquire Time Warner or divest ownership of either Turner Broadcasting, DirecTV, or CNN. In response, AT&T and Time Warner extended their merger deadline to June 21, 2018. The court trial began on March 19, 2018, and was overseen by District Judge Richard J. Leon, (the same judge who approved Comcast's purchase of NBCUniversal).

Media outlets often referred to the court trial as the antitrust trial of the century. The DOJ said the trial would "chart the course for the future of video-content delivery in the United States." The court trial was the most significant federal review into Hollywood since the Paramount Decree of 1948. Representing the Justice Department was Craig Conrath while Daniel Petrocelli jointly represented AT&T and Time Warner. Petrocelli argued that letting AT&T purchase Time Warner would grant stronger competition against Big Tech companies. Jeff Bewkes testified on April 18, 2019, and assured that AT&T would not withhold Time Warner content from competitors. Stephenson testified on April 19, 2018, and said acquiring Time Warner presented AT&T with a rare opportunity. On June 12, 2018, Judge Leon ruled AT&T could proceed with purchasing Time Warner and stated the merger did not harm consumers. Outside the courtroom. Makan Delrahim said the DOJ would review Judge Leon's decision and the Justice Department said, "we will closely review the Court's opinion and consider next steps in light of our commitment to preserving competition for the benefit of American consumers."

== Post-merger integration ==
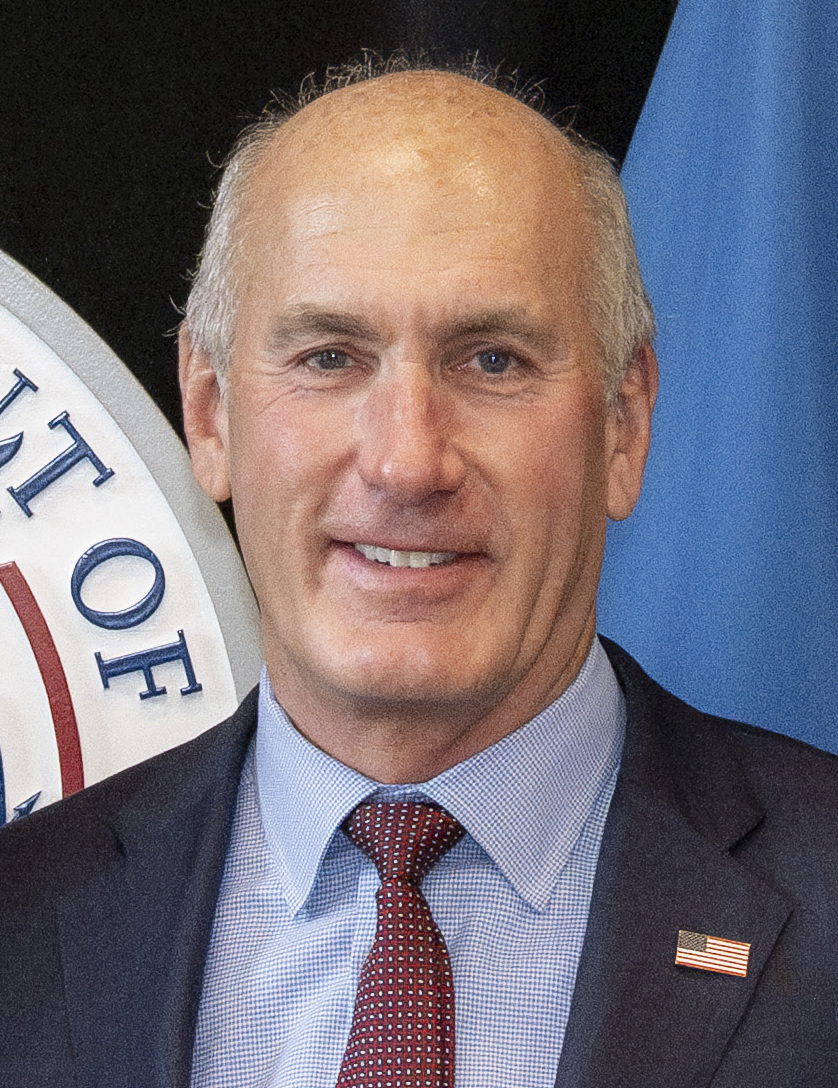
John Stankey, the current chairman and CEO of AT&T. WarnerMedia CEO from 2018 to 2020.

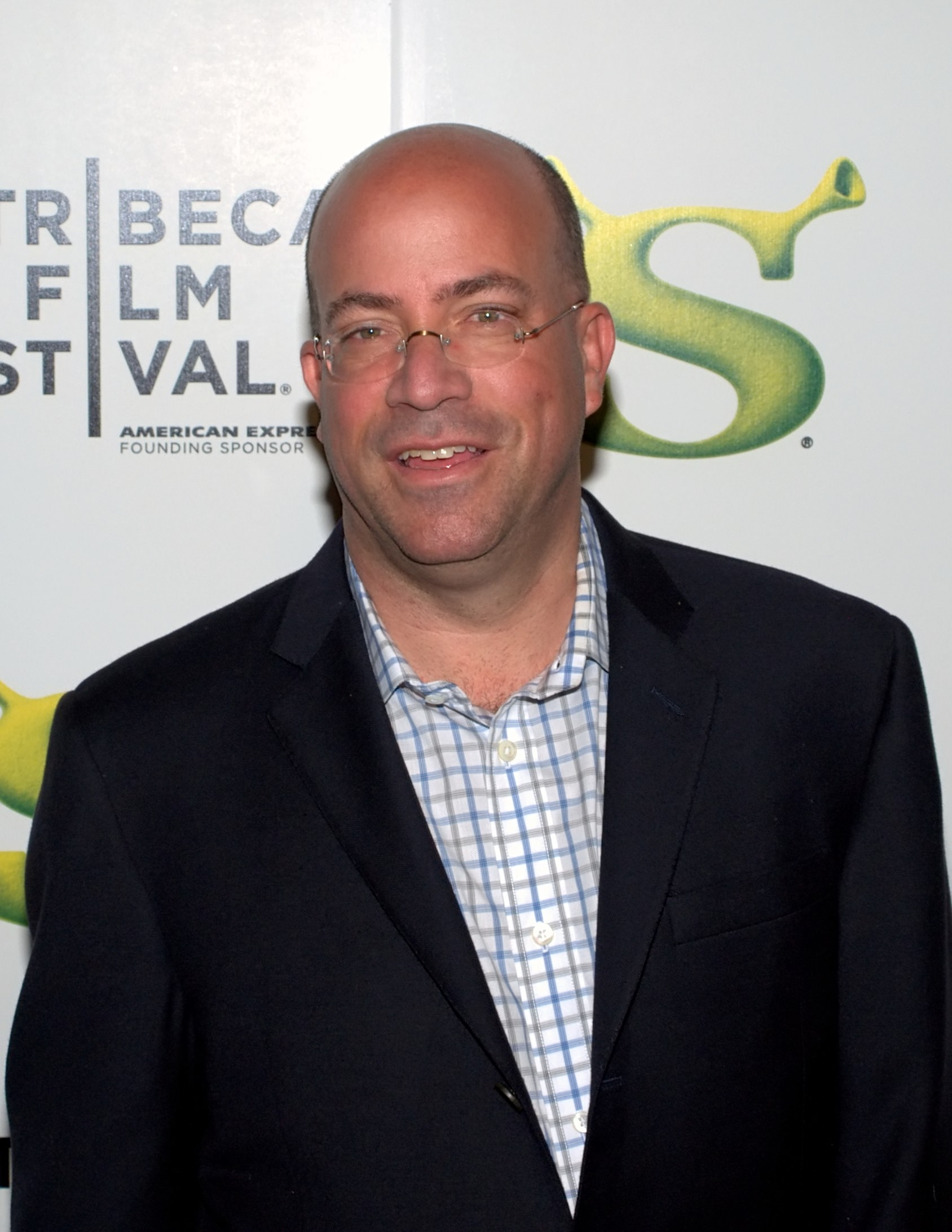
Jeff Zucker, former President of WarnerMedia News & Sports and CNN Worldwide

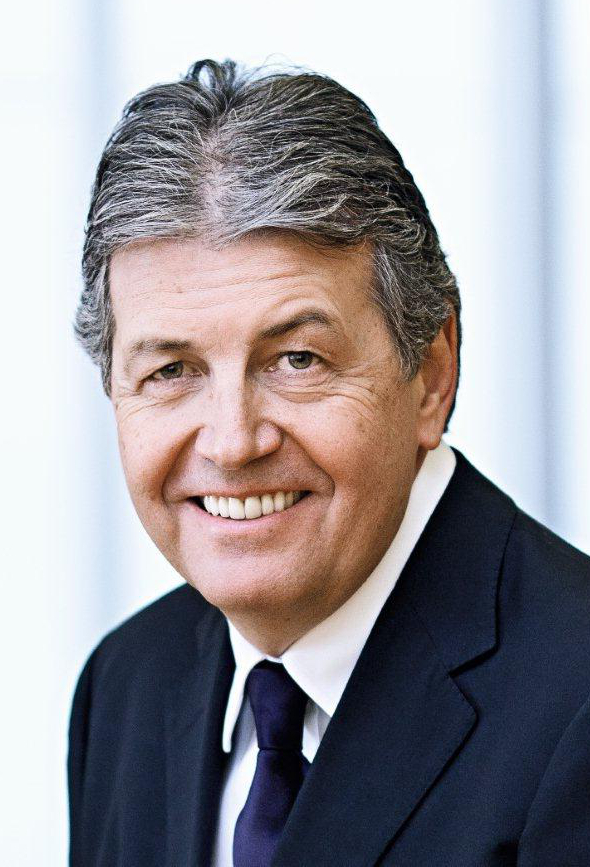
Gerhard Zeiler, the current WBD International President.

=== Immediate changes ===
AT&T completed its purchase of Time Warner on June 14, 2018, and took the company Privately held company and reported its financial statements under its SEC filings. Immediate changes to Time Warner included converting it into a Limited liability company, delisting its ticker symbol (TWX) from the stock market, and dissolving its board of directors. On June 15, 2018, AT&T renamed the company to WarnerMedia to avoid confusion with the separate Time Warner Cable. Jeff Bewkes retired as CEO and was succeeded by longtime AT&T executive John Stankey. WarnerMedia employees received special discounts on AT&T services, though some were hoping for free smartphones. In a June 18, 2018, interview with Variety, Stankey acknowledged AT&T's high debt load of $180 billion but assured it manageable. He said he planned to familiarize himself with WarnerMedia's 24,000 employees, remarking, "None of these employees know me or who I am. I need to pull some mystery out of the equation." He also ruled out major reorganization, stating that the current plans were to integrate WarnerMedia's content creation with AT&T's data-mining operations.

On July 12, 2018, the Justice Department appealed Judge Leon's merger ruling to the D.C. Circuit Court of Appeals. AT&T stated it would not sell any of WarnerMedia assets but would delay further changes to the company until the court's decision. For the rest of 2018, WarnerMedia experienced minimal changes aside from replacing several executives. On August 7, 2018, AT&T acquired the remainder of Otter Media from the Chernin Group and brought it under its WarnerMedia segment. The unit consisted presently of Warner Bros. Entertainment, Home Box Office, Inc., Turner Broadcasting, and Otter Media. To further complement its vertically integrated media strategy, AT&T acquired AppNexus on September 25, 2018, and brought it under its newly reorganized ad tech division of Xandr (named after Alexander Graham Bell). AT&T also announced plans for WarnerMedia to develop a streaming service using HBO's branding to compete against other streaming businesses like Netflix and Hulu. The Circuit Courts upheld Judge Leon's ruling on February 20, 2019, and the DOJ agreed to end its efforts at undoing the merger. With all legal hurdles cleared, it was widely expected that AT&T would soon carry out a massive overhaul of WarnerMedia's operations. Upon this news, HBO's Richard Plepler and Turner's David Levy resigned from the company and cited conflicting views with AT&T's media strategy. Turner Broadcasting System was dissolved as an active business on March 4, 2019, and WarnerMedia's assets were brought under several streamlined units.

WarnerMedia's new divisions included WarnerMedia Entertainment & Direct to Consumer, headed by former NBC executive Robert Greenblatt, managing Home Box Office, TBS, TNT, TruTV, and the soon-to-launch streaming service. WarnerMedia News & Sports, led by CNN President Jeff Zucker, oversaw AT&T SportsNet, Turner Sports, CNN Worldwide, and Bleacher Report, along with WarnerMedia Affiliates and Advertising Sales, led by Turner International President Gerhard Zeiler, who handled the company's consolidated advertising and distribution sales. Meanwhile, Warner Bros. Entertainment CEO Kevin Tsujihara was put in charge of a subdivision named Warner Bros. Global Kids, Young Adults & Classics, which ran Otter Media, Cartoon Network Inc., and TCM. AT&T stated the restructuring was a part of larger efforts to eliminate corporate barriers between WarnerMedia's subsidiaries and centralize the company's assets. On March 13, 2019, Ted Turner issued a statement entrusting Stephenson and Stankey to handle Turner Broadcasting's former assets. In a series of debt reduction moves, AT&T sold WarnerMedia's 9.5 stake in Hulu to the Walt Disney Company for 1.43 billion on April 15, 2019, and completed a $2.2 billion sale-leaseback of WarnerMedia's 30 Hudson Yards headquarters on April 24, 2019. Otter Media was also transferred to WarnerMedia Entertainment and given oversight to preside over WarnerMedia's upcoming streaming service. The platform was later unveiled as HBO Max on July 9, 2019, and slated for a spring 2020 release.

=== Debt management and further restructuring ===
Preview logo of HBO Max

In an interview with CNBC on June 7, 2019, Stankey was asked about his role nearly a year after becoming WarnerMedia's CEO. He denied rumors of culture clashes between WarnerMedia and AT&T and mentioned plans to integrate DirecTV Now into the upcoming streaming service, although this never happened. Stankey was later promoted to AT&T's President and Chief Operating Officer on September 3, 2019, fueling speculation about whether he was set to succeed Randall Stephenson as AT&T's CEO. On September 9, 2019, Elliot Management, an activist investment firm, acquired a $3.2 billion stake in AT&T and sent a letter to its board of directors criticizing the company's diversification strategy. Elliot remarked that AT&T's large purchases of Time Warner and DirecTV left it heavily indebted and were responsible for a stagnant share price, stating, "AT&T has yet to articulate a clear strategic rationale for why it needs to own Time Warner." Elliot also suggested selling DirecTV and questioned Stankey's leadership of WarnerMedia. On September 17, 2019, Stephenson denied that Stankey was succeeding him, defended his M&A strategy, and said it would benefit AT&T in the long run.

Stankey also defended these acquisitions, stating, "The collection of assets we have accumulated was pointed out to be something that could create significant value." President Trump, who previously called for a boycott of AT&T over its ownership of CNN, praised Elliot's stake and suggested it could improve the cable network. Stankey reaffirmed his previous statements, calling critics of Stephenson's diversification strategy "categorically wrong," and said no successors were being considered for him as WarnerMedia CEO, adding, "I'm not looking to find my successor right now." When asked by the Wall Street Journal about AT&T's succession plan, Stankey declined to comment, saying it was up to the board of directors. On September 28, 2019, AT&T and Elliot Management reached a three-year resolution, with Stephenson pledging to remain AT&T's Chairman and CEO until 2020 and stating that the company would "evaluate multiple options and partnerships for DirecTV." HBO Max was introduced to AT&T investors at the Warner Bros. Studios Burbank Lot on October 29, 2019, with a scheduled release in May 2020, priced at $14.00 per month and offering over 10,000 hours of content. Stephenson described HBO Max as being in a league of its own and unlike other streaming platforms.

AT&T committed to investing $2 billion annually into HBO Max and projected it would reach 75–90 million subscribers by 2025, achieving profitability by then. By December 2019, it was reported that potential successors to Stankey as WarnerMedia CEO were being considered, with Robert Greenblatt and Brian Lesser emerging as contenders. The January 2020 AT&T annual report stated that the company paid down over $20 billion in debt during 2019. WarnerMedia also announced a new film label for HBO Max called WarnerMax. By March 11, 2020, Xandr CEO Brian Lesser left AT&T after learning he would not become WarnerMedia's next CEO. Like many media conglomerates, WarnerMedia was heavily affected by the COVID-19 pandemic due to stay-at-home orders and restrictions on public spaces, which led to profit losses and mass layoffs. On April 24, 2020, John Stankey was named AT&T's next CEO, and Hulu cofounder Jason Kilar was appointed as WarnerMedia's new CEO. Xandr was integrated into WarnerMedia on April 30, 2020, and HBO Max launched on May 4, 2020. Many Warner Bros. films were either delayed or released directly to HBO Max. In August 2020, Jason Kilar carried out another reorganization of WarnerMedia, that resulted in Robert Greenblatt's departure and the consolidation of WarnerMedia Entertainment's assets and Warner Bros. Entertainment into WarnerMedia Studios & Networks. HBO Max was placed under management of WarnerMedia Direct, while WarnerMedia International was separated from WarnerMedia Sales & Distribution. By late 2020, most Time Warner-era executives had departed from WarnerMedia. Jason Kilar and by extension WarnerMedia, faced great criticism from the entertainment industry for their Project Popcorn initiative that released the entirety of Warner Bros' 2021 film slate across theaters and HBO Max.

WarnerMedia Studios & Networks	WarnerMedia News & Sports	WarnerMedia International	WarnerMedia Sales & Distribution	WarnerMedia Direct
Warner Bros. Entertainment Home Box Office, Inc. TNets (TBS, TNT, TruTV) The CW (50% Interest)	CNN Worldwide Turner Sports Bleacher Report AT&T SportsNet	WarnerMedia EMEA WarnerMedia Latin America WarnerMedia Asia-Pacific	Otter Media Xandr Advertising, Content Licensing and advertising for WarnerMedia	HBO Max

== Divestment and spinoff ==
Evolution of AT&T
- 1885: The American Bell company established the original iteration of AT&T to develop and operate the first long-distanced telephone network in the United States
- 1899: With the emergence of thousands of independent telephone companies, American Bell oversaw the transfer of its businesses to its subsidiary, AT&T
- 1901: AT&T underwent an initial public offering on the New York Stock Exchange, and embarked on a years-long acquisition spree to expand its telephone network
- 1907: Investors led by J.P. Morgan gained control over an indebted AT&T, and they appointed Theodore Vail as CEO to carry out goals for a telephone monopoly
- 1911: Morgan's financial backing allowed AT&T to buy hundreds of telephone companies and merge them into local operators, helping form the basis of the Bell System
- 1913: The Kingsbury Commitment enforced new regulations on AT&T by requiring its long-distance network to interconnect and secure approval for any acquisition
- 1918: A one-year wartime measure done by the U.S. Government briefly nationalized the telecom sector in the United States and placed it under the management of AT&T
- 1922: Even after the wartime measure ended, AT&T's competition had effectively been eliminated, and the Willis Graham Act helped solidify it as a monopoly
- 1925: Bell Laboratories was founded as AT&T's research and development division, and it would oversee numerous inventions that contributed to modern technology
- 1930: AT&T entered the 1930s as the world's largest company by total asset valuation and remained one of the most profitable corporations for the next several decades
- 1947: Researchers at Bell Labs developed the Transistor, and by the 1950s, it became a revolutionary due to its efficiency
- 1956: A consent decree between AT&T and the U.S. Department of Justice restricted the company to its native field of telephony
- 1974: After many unsuccessful lawsuits, the Justice Department sued AT&T in an antitrust lawsuit and sought to dismantle the Bell System piece by piece
- 1983: AT&T settled in 1982 and prepared for the Bell System breakup. Bell Labs assumed Western Electric's assets and was placed under AT&T Technologies
- 1984: Once the Bell System ended and became seven regional companies, AT&T entered into computing
- 1996: In preparation for relaxed regulations, AT&T separated NCR Corporation and Lucent Technologies into public companies and formed AT&T Labs
- 1999: Southwestern Bell grew throughout the late 1990s by acquiring Pacific Telesis and Ameritech while AT&T became the largest American cable operator
- 2002: Due to mounting debt, AT&T separated its cable and wireless divisions, and those companies were acquired by Comcast and Cingular Wireless
- 2005: Southwestern Bell acquired AT&T Corporation and adopted its branding as the modern iteration of AT&T
- 2007: Shortly after acquiring BellSouth, AT&T rebranded Cingular as AT&T Mobility and secured a four-year exclusivity contract with the newly released iPhone
- 2011: AT&T attempted to acquire T-Mobile US from Deutsche Telekom, but after the deal faced a lawsuit from regulators, the merger was eventually cancelled
- 2015: DirecTV was acquired and brought under AT&T Communications, while AT&T expanded its presence in Mexico
- 2018: Wanting to achieve vertical integration, AT&T bought out Time Warner and rebranded it as WarnerMedia
- 2020: HBO Max was released by WarnerMedia as the company's core streaming service to combat cord-cutting in pay televison
- 2022: AT&T and Discovery, Inc. conducted a Reverse Morris Trust and merged WarnerMedia into a separate company called Warner Bros. Discovery
- 2026: AT&T acquired the fiber internet assets of Lumen Technologies and celebrated 125 years of being a publicly traded company on the New York Stock Exchange

=== Reverse Morris Trust process ===
On May 16, 2021, Bloomberg News and other media outlets reported that AT&T was considering divesting its ownership of WarnerMedia and have it merge with Discovery, Inc. These reports were later proven true when AT&T and Discovery jointly announced their definitive merger agreement on May 17, 2021, that would see WarnerMedia separated from AT&T through a Reverse Morris Trust and transferred to Discovery to form a new publicly traded company. AT&T shareholders would own 71% of the new company's stock while Discovery shareholders would own the remaining 29%. The new board of directors would consist of seven AT&T appointees and six Discovery appointees. The company's executives would mostly consist of Discovery's executives and be led by David Zaslav. The outgoing WarnerMedia CEO, Jason Kilar, along with most WarnerMedia executives, were expected to resign upon the merger's completion. Goals for the new company included an annual spending of $20 billion on content, merging the streaming services of HBO Max and Discovery+, achieving $3 billion in cost savings via synergies, and reaching 400 million global subscribers.

On July 1, 2021, the name for the new company was announced as Warner Bros. Discovery, with the initial tagline included "The stuff that dreams are made of"—a quote from the 1941 Warner Bros. film The Maltese Falcon. David Zaslav outlined a plan for Warner Bros. Discovery to be the "most innovative, exciting and fun place to tell stories in the world" and combine Warner Bros.' "Fabled hundred-year legacy of creative, authentic storytelling and taking bold risks to bring the most amazing stories to life" with Discovery's "integrity, innovation and inspiration." AT&T would receive US$43 billion in cash and debt from the divestment while WBD would inherit over $40 billion in debt. The merger was expected to be completed in mid-2022. In an SEC Filing on November 18, 2021, Discovery revealed that talks with AT&T had fallen through in April 2021, due to disagreements over the ownership of the new company between AT&T and Discovery shareholders, and the amount of debt transferred to Discovery when they merged with WarnerMedia, before talks resumed on May 17, 2021. On January 5, 2022, The Wall Street Journal reported that WarnerMedia and Paramount Global (at the time named ViacomCBS) were exploring a possible sale of either a majority stake or all of The CW, and that Nexstar Media Group was considered a leading bidder.

Logo of Warner Bros. Discovery

On January 26, 2022, AT&T CEO John Stankey stated that the merger was expected to close sometime during the second quarter of 2022. On February 1, 2022, it was reported that AT&T had finalized the structure of the merger: WarnerMedia would be spun off pro rata to AT&T's shareholders and then merge into Discovery Inc. to form the new company. The transaction was approved by the Brazilian antitrust regulator Cade on February 7, followed by the United States Department of Justice on February 9. On March 11, 2022, the merger was approved by Discovery's shareholders. Due to the structure of the merger, it did not require separate approval from AT&T shareholders. In an SEC filing on March 25, 2022, AT&T stated that two-way trading of WBD stock with that of AT&T would begin on April 4, 2022, and that a special dividend would be issued the next day to give AT&T shareholders a 0.24 share in WBD for each share of AT&T common stock they hold. The merger was officially completed on April 8, 2022, with trading beginning on the Nasdaq on April 11.

=== Recent developments ===
Despite AT&T no longer being involved with the entertainment industry by 2022, it continued to own a 70% majority stake in DirecTV, with the remaining 30% being owned by TPG, Inc. It was not until late 2024, when AT&T reached an agreement with TPG to transfer full ownership of DirecTV, with the transaction later being completed by July 2025, marking the first time since 2015 that AT&T was no longer involved in and way or shape with satellite television.

== Works cited ==
Coll, Steve (January 1, 1988). The Deal of the Century: The Breakup of AT&T. Simon & Schuster. ISBN 9780671645922.

== See also ==
- Merger of AOL and Time Warner (2001)
- Acquisition of NBC Universal by Comcast (2011)
- Acquisition of 21st Century Fox by Disney (2019)
- 2019 merger of CBS and Viacom (2019)
- Merger of Discovery, Inc. and WarnerMedia (2022)
- Merger of Skydance Media and Paramount Global (2025)
- Acquisition of Warner Bros. Discovery by Paramount Skydance (2026)
