= Merger of Discovery, Inc. and WarnerMedia =

Business transaction from 2021 to 2022

- Logos before the merger

- Logo after the merger
- Initiator: Discovery, Inc.
- Target: WarnerMedia from AT&T
- Type: Merger
- Cost: US$43 billion
- Initiated: May 16, 2021; 5 years ago
- Completed: April 8, 2022; 4 years ago
- Resulting entity: Warner Bros. Discovery

Discovery, Inc. and WarnerMedia announced a $43 billion merger agreement on May 16, 2021, conducted under a Reverse Morris Trust deal. This separated WarnerMedia from AT&T and immediately merged it with Discovery to create a new, publicly traded company. Between 2015 and 2018, AT&T acquired several mass media businesses to become a major player in entertainment, but these massive transactions resulted in AT&T becoming a highly indebted company. Senior executives were hoping this diversification strategy would transform AT&T into a vertically integrated content distributor, but disappointing synergies led it to pivot from these goals and refocus on its core business of telecommunications.

Due to the structure of Reverse Morris transactions, WarnerMedia's divestment was technically an all-stock combination and tax-free transfer of ownership. This meant Discovery was the acquiring party in the merger, and the new company would only retain Discovery's financial accounting. AT&T received $40.4 billion in cash and debt securities, while its shareholders got an initial 71% majority interest (1.7 billion shares) in the merged company's stock. Discovery shareholders got the remaining 29% interest (696 million shares). The new company's name was announced as Warner Bros. Discovery on June 1, 2021, and after an approval period from regulatory agencies, the merger closed on April 8, 2022.

== Background history ==
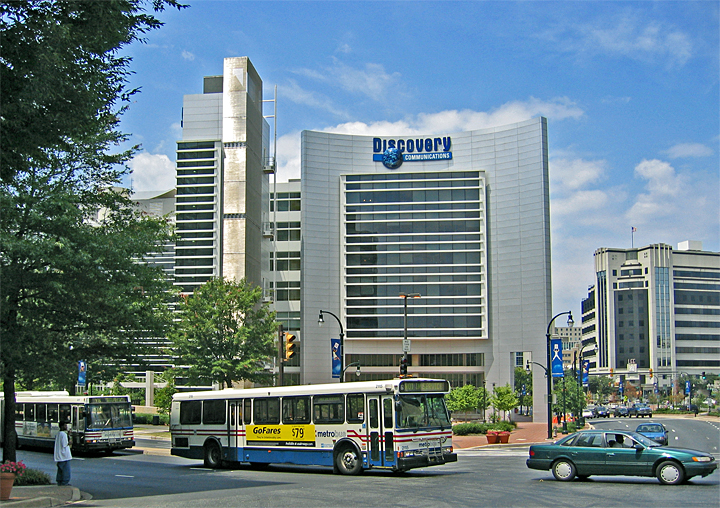
The former Discovery Communications headquarters in Silver Spring, Maryland

=== Discovery Communications ===
Discovery, Inc. was originally founded as the Cable Education Network, Inc. by John Hendricks on September 8, 1982. Cable Education brainstormed ideas for a new cable channel for several years, before settling on the "Discovery" branding and launching the namesake Discovery Channel on June 17, 1985, from a $5 million loan. Cable Education reincorporated as Discovery Communications by mid 1994 and launched a multitude of cable networks like Animal Planet, The Science Channel, and Discovery Life. On November 16, 2006, David Zaslav, a former NBCUniversal executive, was appointed CEO and President of Discovery Communications. Under his leadership, the company went public on the Nasdaq stock exchange on September 18, 2008, following the consolidation of ownership interests from John C. Malone's Discovery Holdings and Advance/Newhouse.

John Hendricks retired from Discovery by 2014 and sometime in mid 2017, rumors circulated that Discovery and Scripps Networks Interactive were in talks for potentially merging. This speculation was proven true on July 31, 2017, when Discovery and Scripps Networks announced their $14.6 billion merger agreement. The merger went through a regulatory review and closed on March 6, 2018, with the combined entity becoming Discovery, Inc. Scripps shareholders received a 20% interest in the merged company's stock. Discovery, Inc. also relocated from its longtime Silver Spring, Maryland headquarters to 230 Park Avenue South in New Yok City. By late 2019, Discovery, Inc. announced plans for a new direct-to-consumer streaming platform known as Discovery+. The platform launched internationally during 2021 and made its debut in the United States on January 4, 2021. Discovery+ features popular Discovery channels like TLC, Food Network, and HGTV, along with the BBC.

AT&T's purchase of Time Warner was its biggest to date, with the cost totaling to 108.7 billion.

=== AT&T's media ambitions ===
During the 2010s major telecom companies were investing heavily into entertainment. Comcast had acquired full ownership of NBCUniversal in 2013 while Verizon purchased internet companies like Yahoo and AOL. AT&T’s only media holding was Otter Media, a joint venture with the Chernin Group that owned digital media companies like Rooster Teeth, Crunchyroll, and Fullscreen. By May 18, 2014, AT&T announced its agreement with the DirecTV Group to acquire the company for $48.5 billion and assumed debts of $18.6 billion for a total offer of $67.1 billion. Following a lengthy regulatory review, the transaction closed on July 24, 2015, with DirecTV being brought into AT&T’s communications segment under a newly formed entertainment division.

After purchasing DirecTV, AT&T became interested in acquiring a media conglomerate. Talks were held with Summer and Shari Redstone over acquiring CBS Corporation, but these were unsuccessful. Sometime in August 2016, the Chief Executives of AT&T and the Chernin Group, Randall Stephenson and Peter Chernin, spoke at a Martha's Vineyard dinner about growing changes in the media landscape. Peter mentioned to Randall about the immense value of Time Warner (not to be confused with Time Warner Cable), and this led to Randall meeting with Jeff Bewkes (Time Warner's chairman). The two came in agreement over shifting consumer trends and merger discussions soon began between AT&T and Time Warner. The agreement was only known by a select group of bankers and executives until October 22, 2016, when AT&T and Time Warner went public with their acquisition agreement. Immediate reactions to it were mostly mixed to negative. Many on Wall Street and Washington expressed concern at how AT&T would run a media company.

Then-candidate Donald Trump disapproved of the merger, and after winning the 2016 Presidential Election, renewed thought emerged over whether the incoming Trump Administration would follow through on blocking the acquisition. AT&T and Time Warner downplayed concerns their acquisition received and said merging would improve competition. On February 15, 2017, Time Warner shareholders approved AT&T's takeover and by September 2017, most foreign regulatory agencies granted permission for the acquisition to proceed. This meant final approval would come from the Justice Department, but this changed on November 20, 2017, when the DOJ unexpectedly sued AT&T for antitrust violations. AT&T fought the lawsuit in court and won on June 12, 2018. AT&T finalized its purchase of Time Warner just two days later, on June 14, 2018, and renamed the company to WarnerMedia. Under AT&T, much of WarnerMedia was heavily reorganized. These efforts included consolidating WarnerMedia's businesses under closely related company divisions, repositioning HBO as a Netflix competitor, and dissolving Turner Broadcasting System.

== Prelude to spinoff and debt levels ==
AT&T's purchases of Time Warner and DirecTV were among the largest mergers and acquisitions in corporate history and totaled to $133.9 billion. AT&T also assumed the debt balances of both companies, adding roughly $41.9 billion to its existing debt. From 2019 to 2021, AT&T was the world's most indebted company, with its debt being nearly $200 billion.

AT&T's outstanding debt evolution
| Year | Debt Levels (Quarter 1) | Debt Levels (Quarter 4) | Explanation |
|---|---|---|---|
| 2014 | $82.57 billion | $82.1 billion | AT&T closes off 2014 with over $82 billion in outstanding debt. It gained over $8 billion in debt. |
| 2015 | $81.83 billion | $126.15 billion | AT&T spent $67.1 billion to acquire The DirecTV Group and assumed over 23 billion in debt. This increases AT&T's longstanding debt by over $45 billion. |
| 2016 | $126.15 billion | $123.51 billion | AT&T decreases its debt by over $2.5 billion. |
| 2017 | $123.51 billion | $164.35 billion | AT&T's debt increases by over $40 billion |
| 2018 | $164.35 billion | $176.5 billion | AT&T's debt load increases around 8 billion |
| 2019 | $176.5 billion | $184.95 billion | AT&T's debt load increases by 8 billion |
| 2020 | $184.95 billion | $157.245 billion | AT&T decreases its debt by over $27 billion, marking a significant milestone |
| 2021 | $180.19 billion | $177.35 billion | AT&T's first quarterly report on March 31, 2021, showed its outstanding debt at $180.19 billion. By AT&T's fourth quarterly report, over $3.5 billion in debt had been paid down. 2021 Q1 and 2021 Q4 |

== Merger timeline ==
=== Regulatory approval ===
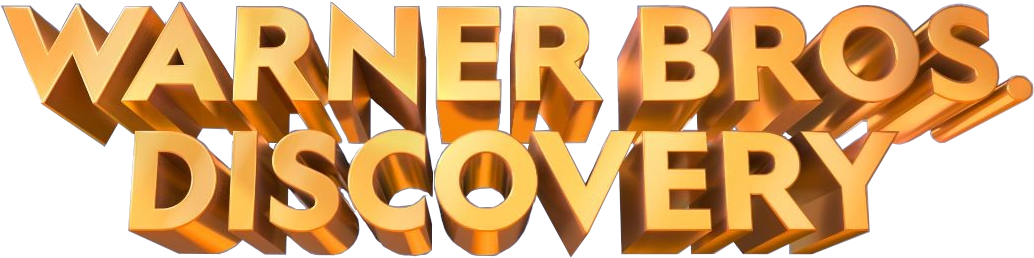
Initial placeholder logo for Warner Bros. Discovery

After several days of speculation, AT&T and Discovery, Inc. announced on May 17, 2021 that they had reached a Reverse Morris Trust agreement. Under the terms of the deal, AT&T's WarnerMedia subsidiary would be separated and merged with Discovery to form a new company. The merger was subject to shareholder and regulatory approval, with an expected closing date in early 2022. The merger was completed on April 8, 2022. AT&T shareholders received a 71% interest in the merged company's stock and Discovery shareholders held the remaining 29%. and appoint six board members. AT&T was initially set to receive $43 billion in cash and debt securities but only ended up receiving $40.4 billion. from the spin-off. In exchange, AT&T transferred $43 billion of debt to the new company. Discovery's Chief Executive, David Zaslav would be set to lead the new company. Zaslav stated that the new company's goal would be to "tell the most amazing stories and have a ton of fun doing it" The company will aim to expand their streaming services (which includes WarnerMedia's HBO Max) to reach 400 million global subscribers.

The merged company would be known as Warner Bros. Discovery on June 1, 2021. Originally, the streaming services of HBO Max and Discovery+ were supposed to merge upon the merger's completion, but this was abandoned in favor of allowing the platforms to continue to exist separately. The European Commission approved the merger on December 22, 2021, while Brazilian regulators approved it on February 7, 2022. The Department of Justice Approved the merger two days later on February 9, 2022, clearing all regulatory hurdles and allowing the transaction to close. Near the closing date of the merger, dozens of WarnerMedia executives resigned from the company due to the incoming Discovery management. It was also expected that layoffs would be expected too. The merger ultimately closed on April 8, 2022.

== Recent developments and WBD bidding war ==

Netflix, Paramount, Comcast and Starz bidded against each other to acquire Warner Bros. Discovery's assets.

Issues facing Warner Bros. Discovery since the merger are its high debt load and cost cutting strategies. This led to speculation of whether the company was considering potential M&A business deals. However, WBD frequently denied this. On July 18, 2024, the Financial Times reported that Zaslav and WBD executives were discussing possibilities of breaking up the company, to separate the less profitable linear TV networks from the more successful film studios and streaming services. This speculation was proven true in June 2025 when Warner Bros. Discovery announced its plans to split into separate companies. These successor companies would be "Warner Bros." and "Discovery Global." This announcement came after Comcast's NBCUniversal declared plans to spin off most NBCU networks into a new company known as Versant Media. The transactions were expected to complete in mid-2026; the split is structured to be tax-free; Discovery Global will assume Warner Bros.' debt. On September 10, 2025, Zaslav stated that the split was on track for completion by April 2026.

On September 11, 2025 Paramount Skydance CEO David Ellison convened a board meeting to discuss a possible acquisition of WBD, a move reported as intended to strengthen Paramount's competitive position against Amazon, Disney, and Netflix. Several days later, Ellison met with Zaslav at his home to propose a cash-and-stock bid of $19 per share. The offer was formalized in a subsequent letter that set the cash component at 60 percent. Later in September, Paramount Skydance raised its offer to $22 per share with a 67 percent cash component, a $2 billion reverse termination fee payable if the deal failed to clear regulatory review, and a provision for Zaslav to remain as co-CEO and co-chairman of the combined company. On October 13, 2025, Paramount Skydance submitted a third offer, raising the bid to $23.50 per share with an 80 percent cash component. WBD continued to reject Paramount's proposals.

After Paramount's three failed attempts, talks of a potential sale of WBD began circulating in October, and the company announced it was reviewing strategic alternatives to its previously announced plan to split into two companies after receiving unsolicited interest from multiple parties. It was said that WBD was initially going to prepare for a bidding process after the completion of the split.

In the first round of non-binding proposals submitted on November 20, 2025, Paramount submitted a $25.50 per share offer for the entire company, Netflix and Comcast submitted bids to acquire the Warner Bros. studios and intellectual properties, HBO and HBO Max, and Starz submitted a $25 billion bid for WBD's Global Linear Networks division and 20% of its Streaming & Studios division. After the auction process concluded in December, Standard General was approached by Warner Bros. Discovery shareholders about a potential acquisition of WBD's Global Linear Networks division.

After the initial round of bids, WBD solicited a second round of bids. On December 1, 2025, Netflix, Paramount and Comcast all once again submitted binding second-round bids, with Paramount submitting an all-cash $26.50 per share offer for the entire company.

As the process moved to a final decision, Paramount sent a letter to Zaslav alleging that the sale had become "tilted" in favor of Netflix. The letter claimed that the WBD board had embarked on "a myopic process with a predetermined outcome", pointing to alleged conflicts of interest regarding the friendship of Zaslav and Netflix co-CEO Ted Sarandos and questioning whether the auction remained fair. The Wall Street Journal reported that Paramount's final offer was $30 per share, all-cash, and it had secured arrangement from its three Middle Eastern sovereign wealth backers to not take board seats that would trigger increased regulatory review.

== Works cited ==
- Hendricks, John (June 25, 2013). A Curious Discovery: An Entrepreneur's Story – A Powerful Autobiography and Valuable Primer for Business Leaders. HarperCollins. ISBN 9780062128553.
- Miller, James Andrew (November 23, 2021). Tinderbox: HBO's Ruthless Pursuit of New Frontiers. ISBN 1250624010.
- Hayes, Dade (April 19, 2022). Binge Times: Inside Hollywood's Furious Billion-Dollar Battle to Take Down Netflix. ISBN 0062980009.
- Malone, John (September 2, 2025). Born to Be Wired: Lessons from a Lifetime Transforming Television. ISBN 1668051532.

== See also ==
- Merger of AOL and Time Warner (2001)
- Acquisition of NBC Universal by Comcast (2011)
- Acquisition of Time Warner by AT&T (2018)
- Acquisition of 21st Century Fox by Disney (2019)
- 2019 merger of CBS and Viacom (2019)
- Merger of Skydance Media and Paramount Global (2025)
- Acquisition of Warner Bros. Discovery by Paramount Skydance (2026)
