= United States v. AT&T =

United States v. AT&T may refer to several court cases:

- United States v. AT&T (1982), a lawsuit enforcing the divestiture of the Bell System
- United States v. AT&T (2019), a lawsuit attempting to block a merger with Time Warner

== See also ==
- Attempted purchase of T-Mobile USA by AT&T, a proposed merger that was withdrawn after initial resistance from regulators
