= Kimmelman =

Origin
- Language: Old High German
- Origin: kumil
- Meaning: Seller of caraway and other spices

Kimmelman is an occupational surname of Jewish origin. Notable people with this name include:

- Burt Kimmelman (born 1947), Jewish-American poet and scholar noted for his criticism of modern American poetry.
- Gene Kimmelman (born c. 1945), American attorney and consumer advocate
- Irwin I. Kimmelman (1930–2014), Attorney General of New Jersey from 1982 – 1986.
- Michael Kimmelman (born 1958), pianist, author, critic and columnist for the New York Times
