= Merger of AOL and Time Warner =

2001 creation of AOL Time Warner

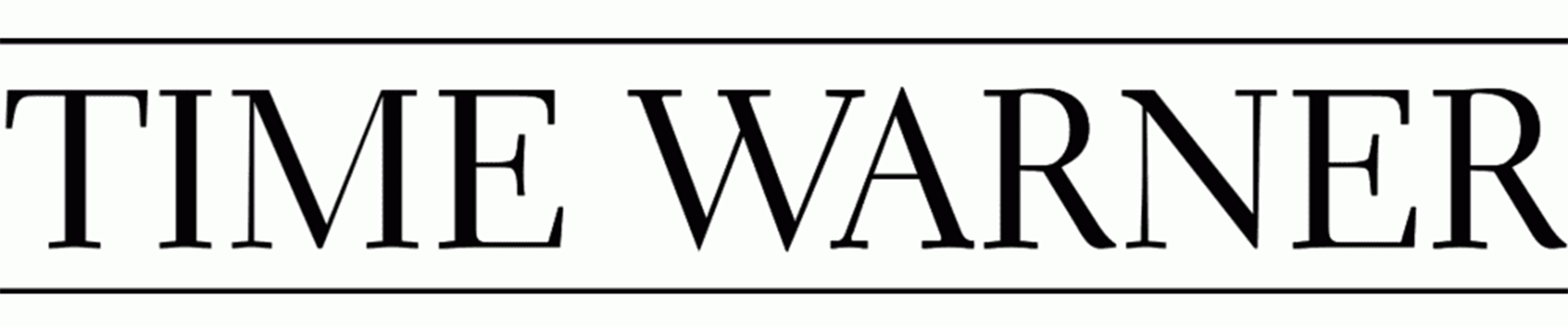
- Logos before the merger

- Logo after the merger
- Initiator: America Online Inc.
- Target: Time Warner Inc.
- Type: Vertical merger
- Cost: US$180 billion
- Initiated: January 10, 2000; 26 years ago
- Completed: January 11, 2001; 25 years ago
- Resulting entity: AOL Time Warner Inc.
- Status: Closed

On January 10, 2000, America Online (AOL) announced a $180 billion merger agreement with Time Warner, to acquire the media conglomerate at $108 a share. Despite Time Warner owning far more assets and having higher revenue, AOL was the acquiring party due to its high market valuation. The merger between the companies was the second largest in corporate history and was often presented as a union between traditional and digital media. After an extensive regulatory review, the merger closed on January 11, 2001, with both companies being consolidated into AOL Time Warner. Hopes for successful synergies between the two firms proved to be unsuccessful, as the merger went on to become one of the most infamous mergers and acquisitions deals.

AOL Time Warner faced challenges with the dot-com bubble, the shift to broadband, and the decline of dial-up Internet. The fast-paced culture of AOL often clashed with Time Warner's more traditional approach, and relations only worsened with the company's declining stock and shareholders losses. In January 2003, AOL reported an annual loss of $99 billion, the largest ever for a corporation. Mounting debt forced the divesture of several businesses, and by late 2003 the shared AOL branding was dropped, with the merged company reverting back to Time Warner. AOL's financial issues continued, and in December 2009 it was spun off as an independent company, bringing an end to one of the worst mergers in history.

== Background and development ==
=== America Online's early dominance ===
AOL was originally founded as Control Video Corporation in 1983, selling games for Atari consoles.

=== Time Warner's first decade ===
Time Warner was first established on January 10, 1990, and immediately became the world's biggest media conglomerate. Its corporate background dates back to the 1920s, with two major media companies: Warner Bros and Time Inc. The Warner Brothers founded Warner Bros: Entertainment.

Time Inc. and Warner Communications completed their merger on January 10, 1990, and Time Warner was officially created. Time Inc. continued as an active subsidiary while Time Warner assumed control over Warner Communications' assets.

Warner Communications and Time Inc. were established between the 1920s and the 1960s and became the parent companies of numerous businesses in the entertainment industry. Warner Communications was originally founded as Kinney National in 1961 as a diversified service industry conglomerate and was involved in funerals, parking, cleaning, and renting. Steven Ross led Kinney National as its President and CEO and oversaw the company's diversification into the media industry. After acquiring the Warner Bros.-Seven Arts film studio, Kinney National separated its service businesses and reincorporated as Warner Communications (WCI) in 1972. WCI owned companies such as Warner Cable, Warner-Elektra-Atlantic, and later, Atari, but later sold the video game business after extensive losses. Time Inc. was co-founded by Henry Luce and Bruce Litton in 1922 as a major magazine publisher. Titles launched included Time, Life, Fortune, and People. Time Inc. became the world's largest magazine publisher and would acquire Home Box Office and launch a publishing division. Warner Communications and Time Inc. decided to merge in 1989 and became the world's largest entertainment company. Following the death of Steven Ross, Gerald Levin would oversee the company's efforts to bring down debt, purchase the Atlanta-based Turner Broadcasting System, and launched The WB.

== Merger timeline ==
In January 2000, America Online (AOL) stated its intentions to purchase Time Warner for $183 billion. Due to the larger market capitalization of AOL, their shareholders would own 55% of the new company while Time Warner shareholders owned only 45%, so in actual practice AOL had merged with Time Warner, even though Time Warner had far more assets and revenues. Time Warner had been looking for a way to embrace the digital revolution, while AOL wanted to anchor its stock price with more tangible assets.

The deal, officially filed on February 11, 2000, employed a merger structure in which each original company merged into a newly created entity. The Federal Trade Commission (FTC) cleared the deal on December 14, 2000, and gave final approval on January 11, 2001; the company completed the merger later that day. The deal was approved on the same day by the Federal Communications Commission (FCC), and had already been cleared by the European Commission (EC) on October 11, 2000.

AOL Time Warner was supposed to be a merger of equals with top executives from both sides. Gerald Levin, who had served as chairman and CEO of Time Warner Entertainment, was CEO of the new company. AOL co-founder Steve Case served as Executive Chairman of the board of directors, Robert W. Pittman (president and COO of AOL) and Dick Parsons (president of Time Warner) served as co-chief operating officers, and J. Michael Kelly (the CFO from AOL) became the chief financial officer.

According to AOL president and COO Bob Pittman, the slow-moving Time Warner Entertainment would now take off at Internet speed, accelerated by AOL: "All you need to do is put a catalyst to [Time Warner Entertainment], and in a short period, you can alter the growth rate. The growth rate will be like an Internet company." The vision for Time Warner's future seemed clear and straightforward; by tapping into AOL, Time Warner would reach deep into the homes of tens of millions of new customers. AOL would use Time Warner's high-speed cable lines to deliver to its subscribers Time Warner's branded magazines, books, music, and movies. This would have created 130 million subscription relationships.

== See also ==
- Acquisition of NBC Universal by Comcast (2011)
- Acquisition of Time Warner by AT&T (2018)
- Acquisition of 21st Century Fox by Disney (2019)
- 2019 merger of CBS and Viacom (2019)
- Merger of Discovery, Inc. and WarnerMedia (2022)
- Merger of Skydance Media and Paramount Global (2025)
- Acquisition of Warner Bros. Discovery by Paramount Skydance (2026)
