= Acquisition of DirecTV by AT&T =

2014 to 2015 business acquisition

- DirecTV logo (pre-acquisition)

- DirecTV logo (post-acquisition)
- Initiator: AT&T Inc.
- Target: The DirecTV Group, Inc.
- Type: Vertical Merger
- Cost: US$48.5 billion (cash and stock alone); equivalent to $66.27 billion in 2025; US$67.1 billion (assumed debt included); equivalent to $91.8 billion in 2025
- Initiated: May 18, 2014
- Completed: July 24, 2015
- Resulting entity: DirecTV taken private and integrated as a subsidiary

AT&T and the DirecTV Group entered into a cash-and-stock agreement on May 18, 2014, in a massive deal that would combine one of the world's largest telecommunications companies with the biggest satellite television operator in the United States. Due to stalling growth from within the wireless sector, AT&T began diversifying into mass media to expand its consumer offerings. As part of their definitive contract, AT&T agreed to pay $48.5 billion at $95 per share to acquire DirecTV and assume up to $18.6 billion in debt obligations for a total offer of $67.1 billion. Early reactions to the proposed acquisition ranged from initial skepticism to heightened concern, as many expressed questions as to why a company like AT&T, which operated within traditional telecom sectors like mobile data and home internet, wanted to oversee the day-to-day operations of a company like DirecTV.

Senior management at AT&T defended the deal as being necessary to compete with Big Tech companies and to create more bundling options for subscribers. Despite the mixed reception, the Federal Communications Commission approved the acquisition on July 24, 2015, and allowed the merger to close. AT&T instantly became the largest American operator of Pay-Tv subscribers and brought DirecTV into its Entertainment Group, headed by John Stankey. DirecTV Now was launched on November 30, 2016, as an alternative to cord-cutting. By 2017, DirecTV was brought under AT&T's Communications Segment.

In the years following the purchase, the pay TV market declined significantly, and, by 2019, Elliott Management called for AT&T to divest "valuable-yet-non-core franchises", such as regional sports networks and Latin American operations. Initially, AT&T defended the acquisition despite steady subscriber losses, but, by February 2021, an agreement was reached with TPG Inc. to transfer ownership of DirecTV. Under the terms of the deal , AT&T would retain a 70% majority stake in DirecTV but would no longer oversee its daily operations. The deal was finalized by August 2, 2021, with AT&T receiving $7.1 billion. By September 30, 2024, AT&T announced that it would sell its remaining seventy-percent stake to TPG Inc. for $7.6 billion. The divestment was completed on July 2, 2025, making DirecTV a wholly owned subsidiary of TPG Inc. and splitting the company off from AT&T for the first time since 2015.

== Background developments ==
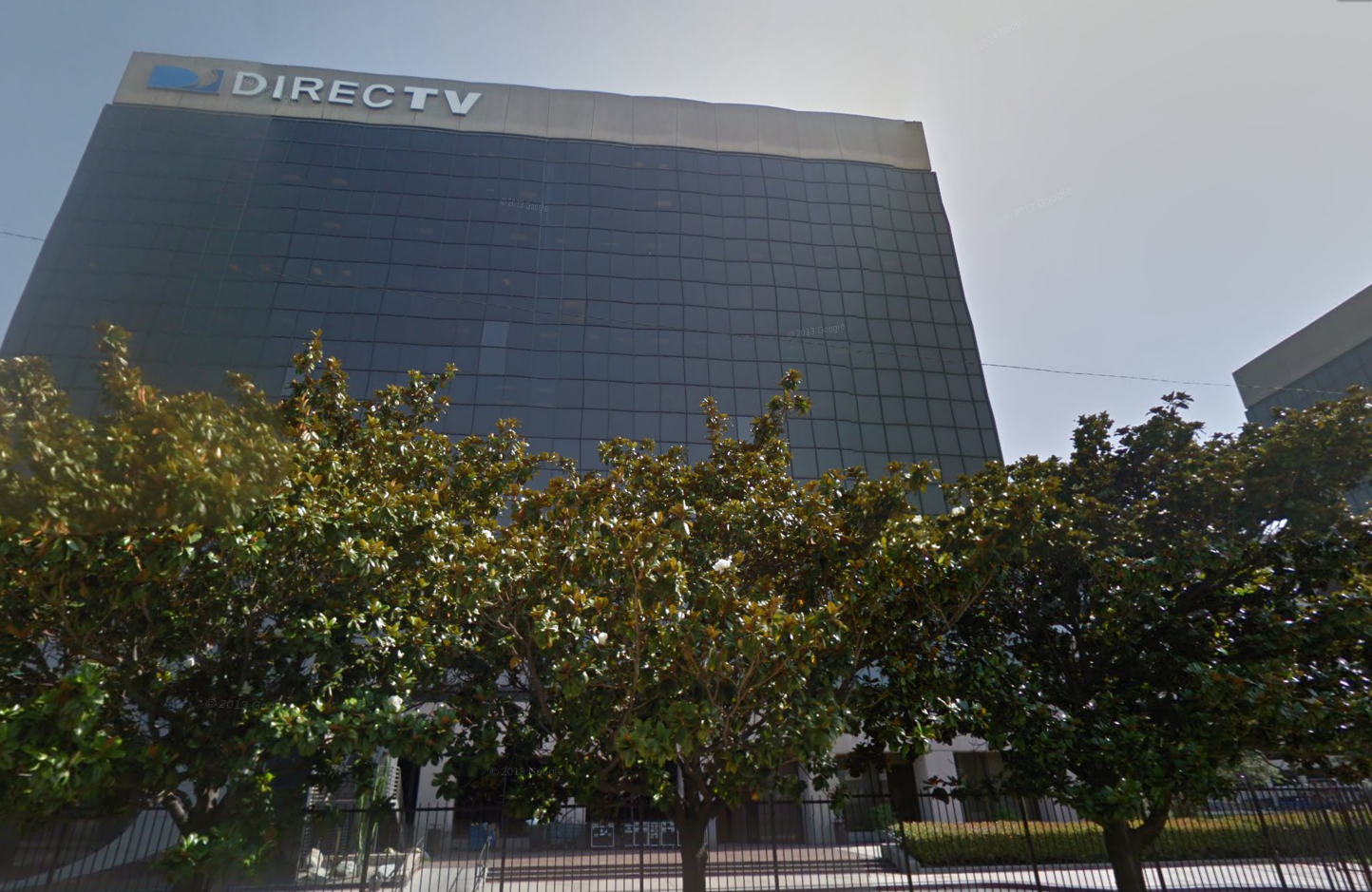
The Former DirecTV headquarters, located in El Segundo, California

=== Rise of Satellite Television ===
Before the rise of satellite television in the 1990s, majority of Americans accessed television through cable systems or rooftop antenna. Advancements from Hughes Electronics, which at the time was owned by General Motors at the time, led to the massive popularization of satellite tv throughout the world. On June 17, 1994, DirecTV was officially launched by Hughes Electronics and later became one of the fastest growing television companies throughout the United States during the 1990s and 2000s. By 2003, Rupert Murdoch acquired a controlling stake in DirecTV through News Corporation, but the investment was short-lived

=== Reunification of Baby Bell Companies ===
John Malone would later control DirecTV and would oversee the process of DirecTV becoming a publicly traded company on the stock market.

== See also ==
- Acquisition of Time Warner by AT&T
- Breakup of the Bell System
