= Xandr =

Advertising and analytics company

Xandr, Inc.
- Formerly: AT&T Advertising and Analytics (2018)
- Type: Subsidiary
- Industry: Advertising; Analytics
- Predecessors: AT&T AdWorks; Turner Advertising
- Founded: September 25, 2018; 7 years ago
- Headquarters: New York City, New York, U.S.
- Area served: Worldwide
- Products: Community; Xandr Invest; Xandr Monetize
- Owner: AT&T (2018–2022); Microsoft (2022–present)
- Parent: WarnerMedia (2020–2022)
- Divisions: Xandr Media; Xandr Data
- Subsidiaries: AppNexus; Clypd
- Website: www.xandr.com

Xandr, Inc. (pronounced "Zander") was the advertising and analytics subsidiary of Microsoft, which operates an online platform, Community, for buying and selling consumer-centric digital advertising.

In December 2021, AT&T sold Xandr (including AppNexus and Clypd) to Microsoft for an undisclosed price. The acquisition was completed in June 2022.

In 2023, Microsoft retired the Xandr name and consolidated the business under its Microsoft Advertising brand.

In 2025, Microsoft announced that it would shut down its buy-side Invest product in early 2026.

== History ==
Following its June 2018 acquisition of AppNexus, Xandr was formed by AT&T to construct a national TV advertising marketplace.

Xandr was launched on September 25, 2018, at its inaugural AT&T Relevance Conference, in Santa Barbara, California. The name "Xandr" was chosen in honor of its parent company's founder, Alexander Graham Bell.

In June 2019, Xandr rebranded its AppNexus DSP, launching Xandr Invest, to serve as its central ad-buying hub.

On October 18, 2019, Xandr acquired Massachusetts-based Clypd, an audience-based sales platform for television advertising.

On April 30, 2020, Xandr was folded into WarnerMedia.

Rumors and speculation spread in 2020 that AT&T was seeking to sell and offload Xandr, along with DirecTV and Crunchyroll. AT&T took on debt to purchase WarnerMedia, and any non-core asset sales would help pay off that debt. Many would-be advertisers were reluctant to use what is essentially a competitor for their ad buys.

On May 17, 2021, it was announced that WarnerMedia would be merged with Discovery, Inc. to form a new publicly traded company known as Warner Bros. Discovery, but that the Xandr business would not be included in the transaction and would remain a division of AT&T. On December 21, 2021, AT&T announced that they had agreed to sell Xandr (including AppNexus and Clypd) to Microsoft for an undisclosed price, subject to customary closing conditions, including regulatory reviews.

On June 6, 2022, Microsoft completed the acquisition of Xandr to bolster its advertising and retail media business, for about $1 billion.

== Leadership ==
Until it was folded into Microsoft Advertising, Xandr was led by Mike Welch, after the departure in March 2020 of former GroupM North America CEO Brian Lesser, who was appointed chief executive officer of AT&T advertising and analytics in 2017. Kirk McDonald, who served as interim CEO following Lesser's departure, moved to GroupM, a subsidiary of WPP, in August 2020.

== Operations ==
In May 2019, Xandr launched Community, its new video marketplace that connects advertisers, publishers, and consumer media brands, including Warner Bros. Discovery platforms: CNN, TNT, TruTV, B/R Live, and Otter Media. Other media on the Community platform includes Vice Media, Hearst Communications, Newsy, Philo, Tubi, and Xumo, Vudu, and Bloomberg.

The Xandr advertising model combines data, AT&T’s then newly acquired WarnerMedia content, AppNexus, and other proprietary advertising technology, to integrate with AT&T’s consumer network, with different commercials being delivered to different viewers simultaneously.

During its first year, Xandr’s revenue was mainly derived from DirecTV sales. The company has approximately 1800 employees, including 60 in Europe.

In 2023 Netzpolitik.org analyzed an inventory file of Xandr and described how it categorizes people in an article series and a talk at the Chaos Communication Congress.
