= Willis Graham Act =

The Willis Graham Act of 1921 effectively established telephone companies as natural monopolies, citing that "there is nothing to be gained by local competition in the telephone industry." The law effectively released AT&T from terms of its Kingsbury Commitment, allowing the company to acquire competing telephone companies under the oversight of the Interstate Commerce Commission (ICC). It was enacted by the 67th United States Congress and signed into law by President Warren G. Harding on June 10, 1921.

== Background ==
The American Telephone and Telegraph Company (AT&T) was incorporated in 1885 as a wholly owned subsidiary of American Bell. On December 30, 1899, AT&T acquired the assets of American Bell and became the parent company of the Bell System. For extending telephone service nationwide, new technologies had to be developed to propagate telephony signals over ever-increasing distances. Until Bell's second patent expired in 1894, Bell Telephone was the only company that could legally operate telephone systems in the United States. Between 1894 and 1904, after Bell's patents expired, over six thousand independent telephone companies arose in the US.

The rise of these new companies brought new problems. Telephone customers on different carriers had no way of contacting each other—there was no inter-connectivity between carriers. In order to connect all of the telephone customers, AT&T began acquiring independent telephone providers, much to the dismay of remaining independents. These independents complained to the attorney general that AT&T was eliminating the competition. In response to this, the attorney general referred the case to the Interstate Commerce Commission (ICC), which began an investigation. AT&T then agreed to a settlement, now known as the Kingsbury Commitment. This consisted of a letter from AT&T stating that "Bell agreed to provide interconnection to the independents and to refrain from further acquisitions."

However, AT&T continued to acquire more non-competing companies. The Willis-Graham Act, which was passed in 1921, shifted merger oversight to the ICC, lessening AT&T's constraints on the acquisition of competitors. This essentially repealed the Kingsbury Commitment. Because of this, by 1924 AT&T had acquired 223 of the 234 independent telephone companies with the approval of the ICC.
