= Gene Kimmelman =

American activist

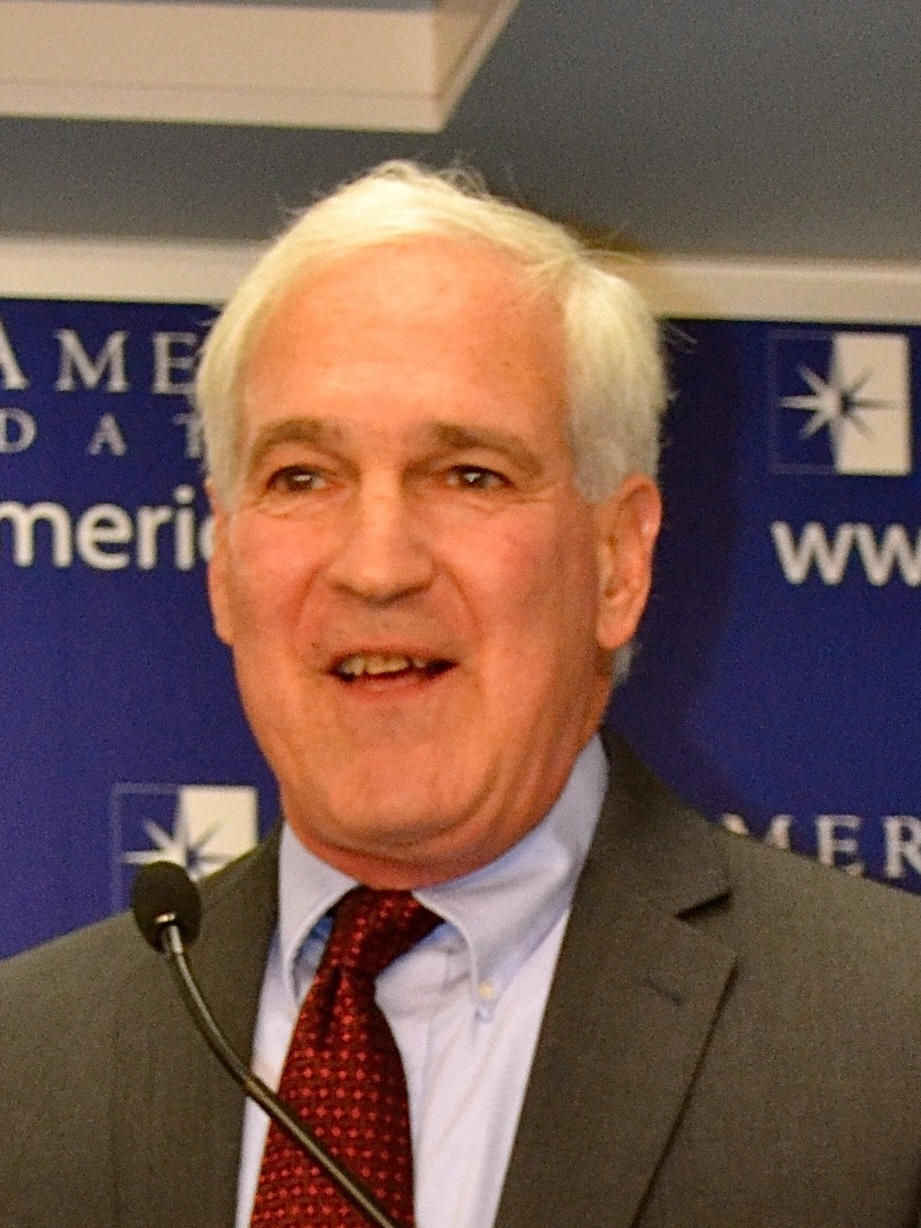

Personal details
- Born: Eugene I. Kimmelman; 1954 or 1955 (age 71–72)
- Party: Democratic
- Spouse: Caroline Chambers
- Education: Oak Ridge High School; Brown University (BA); University of Virginia (JD)

Eugene I. Kimmelman is an American attorney and consumer protection advocate who specializes in antitrust law. Since January 2021, Kimmelman has served as a senior advisor in the Department of Justice (DOJ). During the Obama administration, Kimmelman served within the DOJ as chief counsel of the Antitrust Division.

Kimmelman was formerly the president and chief executive officer of Public Knowledge, a public advocacy group. Prior to this, Kimmelman worked at a variety of organizations, including the Consumers Union, the Consumer Federation of America, and Public Citizen.

== Early life and education ==
Eugene I. Kimmelman was born to Max Kimmelman, a department head for Burlington Industries in Rockwood, Tennessee, and Mira Kimmelman a religious studies teacher at the Beth El Center in Oak Ridge, Tennessee. Kimmelman's brother, Louis "Benno" Kimmelman, was an attorney at Sidley Austin.

Kimmelman attended Oak Ridge High School and in 1977 received his bachelor's degree (A.B.) from Brown University. In 1981, he graduated from the University of Virginia School of Law with a Juris Doctor (J.D.) degree. Kimmelman participated in the Fulbright Program and attended the University of Copenhagen.

== Consumer advocacy ==
Kimmelman began his public advocacy career at Public Citizen, a consumer watchdog group founded by Ralph Nader. Kimmelman was an attorney at Public Citizen's Congress Watch before joining the Consumer Federation of America (CFA), where he was an attorney for ten years. As CFA's legislative director, Kimmelman worked alongside Representative Ed Markey and Senator Billy Tauzin to help craft the Cable Television Consumer Protection and Competition Act of 1992.

Kimmelman served as vice president for federal and international affairs at Consumers Union, staying with the organization for 14 years. While at Consumers Union, Kimmelman was the lead consumer advocate for the Telecommunications Act of 1996. From 2012 to 2014, Kimmelman worked at the New America Foundation.

On January 15, 2014, Public Knowledge announced that Kimmelman was appointed as their President and Chief Executive Officer. Kimmelman left the organization in 2021 to join the Department of Justice as a senior advisor. In this role, Kimmelman worked with FCC Chair Tom Wheeler on a proposal for a digital platform agency that would be responsible for tech industry regulation. Kimmelman has argued that Facebook has harmed consumers by facilitating the dissemination of digital misinformation.

== Policy views ==
Throughout his career, Kimmelman has been noted for his pragmatic approach to politics and ability to build working relationships with Republican politicians such as John McCain and Mike DeWine. According to The New York Times, this approach has led to critics on the left to accuse him of being "too willing to team up with moneyed interests". Kimmelman's approach was criticized by Nader, described as a former mentor, who said he became a "hybrid" consumer advocate.

=== Tech regulation and antitrust ===
Kimmelman has argued that requiring interoperability from Big Tech companies would be a better approach than breaking up the companies, stating that some "more severe remedies can be justified but they cause trade-offs that cause some consumer benefits being given up". In a 2019 collaborative op-ed for Fortune, Kimmelman argued that antitrust enforcement alone is insufficient for spurring competition in the tech industry, arguing that antitrust "cannot overcome or eliminate the natural economic characteristics of these markets that make competition so difficult."

Kimmelman has argued that Facebook has harmed consumers by facilitating the dissemination of digital misinformation. Alongside former FCC Chair Tom Wheeler, Kimmelman has proposed the creation of a digital platform agency that would be responsible for tech industry regulation. The proposal was criticized by some antitrust advocates affiliated with the New Brandeis movement such as Zephyr Teachout, who advocate for "breaking up" Big Tech companies through antitrust enforcement.

=== Telecommunications policy ===
In 2002, Kimmelman supported the ultimately abandoned merger of EchoStar Communications with DirecTV, a position that attracted press attention due to reports that Kimmelman's was a high school friend of EchoStar executive Charles Ergen. Kimmelman criticized Assistant Attorney General for the Antirust Division Joel Klein for failing to stop the BellAtlantic-NYNEX merger.

As chief counsel of the Department of Justice Antitrust Division, Kimmelman helped lead the approval of Comcast’s merger with NBC Universal. Kimmelman was a critic of the AT&T-TimeWarner merger, arguing that the acquisition would harm consumers and hinder competition.

== Government career ==
Kimmelman began his career in government at the Senate Judiciary Subcommittee on Antitrust, Competition Policy and Consumer Rights, where he was chief counsel for two years.

=== Obama Administration ===
In 2009, he joined the Department of Justice Antitrust Division when Christine Varney chose Kimmelman to serve as chief counsel for competition policy and intergovernmental relations. In this role, Kimmelman oversaw the merger of Ticketmaster and Livenation, a deal which "generated protests from lawmakers and consumer groups" according to The Washington Post. While at the Antitrust Division, Kimmelman helped lead the approval of the Comcast-NBC merger.

During this period, Kimmelman supported bringing Apple Inc. to court over price-fixing of ebooks and opposed the attempted purchase of T-Mobile USA by AT&T. Kimmelman advocated that cell phone users should proportionally subsidize government communications infrastructure to non-cellphone users, so that services to low-income regions could be improved. In 2010, Kimmelman was considered for the position of Director of the Consumer Financial Protection Bureau.

=== Biden Administration ===
In November 2020, Kimmelman was named a volunteer member of the Joe Biden presidential transition's Agency Review Team to support transition efforts related to the United States Department of Justice. Kimmelman was reportedly considered for a deputy position within the Antitrust Division. In January 2021, resigned from his role at Public Knowledge to become a senior advisor in the Department of Justice.

== Personal life ==
In 1991, at the age of 36, Kimmelman married Caroline Chambers, a political staffer. Kimmelman is a senior fellow at the University of Colorado Law School. Kimmelman was a contributor at the Federalist Society, having participated in events at the organization in both 2014 and 2019.

== Selected works ==
- Kimmelman, Gene (June 21, 2012), Antitrust Enforcement and Media Industries: Competition and Beyond (PDF), Washington D.C.: United States Department of Justice
