= Brian Lesser =

American businessman

Brian D. Lesser
- Born: c. 1975 (age 50–51)
- Education: BA Political Science from the University of Pennsylvania, MBA from Columbia Business School
- Occupation: Businessman
- Known for: CEO of GroupM
- Children: 3
- Father: Michael S. "Mike" Lesser

Brian D. Lesser is an American businessman who is the former CEO of Xandr and the CEO of GroupM, a WPP company.

== Early life and education ==
Born about 1975, Lesser was introduced to the advertising industry at an early age by his father, Michael S. "Mike" Lesser, who was chairman and CEO of Lowe Marschalk (later Lowe & Partners Inc.), then president of Ogilvy & Mather New York. Mike Lesser was also general manager of The November Group, the advertising arm of the Committee for the Re-Election of the President Richard Nixon, known in pop culture as C.R.E.E.P formed solely to create an ad campaign for the 1972 United States presidential election.

Brian Lesser received a BA in Political Science from the University of Pennsylvania in 1996, then earned an MBA from Columbia Business School in 2004. He resides in New Jersey with his wife and three children.

== Career ==
In 2006, Lesser was vice president of 24/7 Media, then senior vice president of the Media Innovation Group, LLC (known as “The MIG”).

In 2011, he founded Xaxis as a subsidiary of GroupM; he then became CEO of GroupM in November 2015, overseeing six media agencies. As CEO from 2015-2017, WPP's business experienced a 2.3% decline on like-for-like business ^{[10]}, while the broader advertising market grew by approximately 3.4% in 2017, indicating that GroupM underperformed relative to the industry.

In October 2017, Lesser was recruited by former GroupM client AT&T as CEO of Advertising and Analytics.

In September 2018, Advertising and Analytics was renamed Xandr, a subsidiary of AT&T, and Lesser was appointed CEO. Lesser resigned in 2020 after being informed he would not be appointed CEO of WarnerMedia, a position he had been considered for.

During Lesser's tenure at AT&T's Xandr, InfoSum, a data clean room company, pitched and secured strategic investment from Xandr as part of its $15.1M Series A funding round which closed in September of 2020.

Three months later, in December 2020, Lesser stepped into the role of CEO and Chairman of InfoSum which then raised another $65M in 2021. Though the firm's revenue, as of April 2025 was approximately $14.2M, AdAge reported its 2021 valuation at $300M.

Lesser resigned as CEO and Chairman at InfoSum in July 2024 to become Global CEO at GroupM in September 2024. In 2025, it was announced that GroupM acquired InfoSum for $150M, and would then sit within GroupM, now led by Lesser.

== Recognition ==
In 2014, Lesser was named to the Ad Age's “40 Under 40” list and, in 2018, was recognized by AdWeek as "Executive of the Year".

== See also ==
- GroupM
- WPP plc
- AT&T
