= Zenia Mucha =

Head of Communications for TikTok

Zenia Mucha (born 1957) is an American businesswoman who is Chief Brand and Communications Officer at TikTok, after spending 20 years in senior positions at The Walt Disney Company.

== Early life and education ==
Mucha was born in Poland to Ukrainian parents who spent time in work camps in Nazi Germany. She immigrated to New York City at age 9. Mucha graduated from the lower East side St. George Ukrainian Catholic School. Mucha studied political science at Brooklyn College.

== Career ==
Mucha began her professional career in politics, serving as communications director and campaign manager for U.S. Senator Al D'Amato. She took leaves to work on the campaigns of Ronald Reagan and George H. W. Bush. She later worked as the director of communications and as an influential senior policy advisor to Governor of New York George Pataki.

Mucha joined the Walt Disney Company in 2001, as Senior Vice President of Communications for the ABC Broadcast Group and the American Broadcasting Company.

Mucha led communications for Disney's acquisitions of Pixar, Marvel and Lucasfilm. During her tenure, Disney launched D23, the first official Disney fan club, with members in 50 U.S. states and 35 countries.

In 2022 she left the company after nearly 20 years.

In June 2023 Mucha joined TikTok as Chief Brand and Communications Officer.

== Awards ==
In 2012, Mucha received the Matrix Award from New York Women in Communications. In 2017, she was inducted into the PRWeek Hall of Fame.
