= Jeff Bewkes =

American media executive

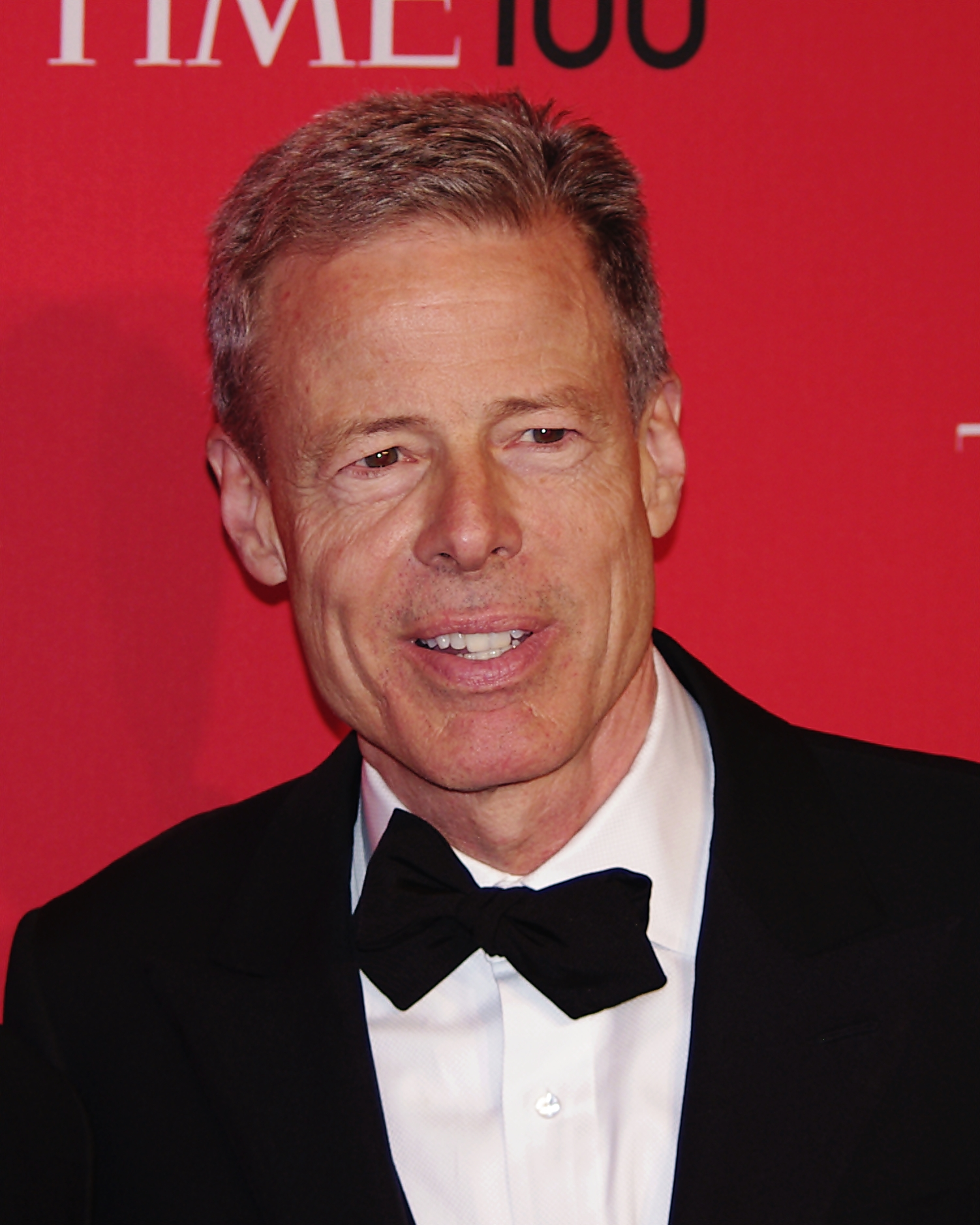
- Bewkes at the Time 100 gala, April 24, 2012
- Born: Jeffrey Lawrence Bewkes; May 25, 1952 (age 74); Paterson, New Jersey, U.S.
- Citizenship: United States
- Education: Deerfield Academy; Yale University (BA); Stanford University (MBA)
- Occupations: Chairman of Time Warner (2009–2018); CEO of Time Warner (2008–2018)
- Years active: 1982–2018
- Employers: HBO (1982–2002); Time Warner (2002–2018)
- Spouses: Susan Kelley (m. 1982; div. 1993) Margaret Brim (m. 1993; div. 2014) Lisa Carco (m. 2017)
- Children: 2

Jeffrey Lawrence Bewkes (born May 25, 1952) is a retired American media executive. He was CEO of Time Warner from January 1, 2008, to June 15, 2018, President from December 2005 to June 2018, and Chairman of the Board from January 1, 2009, to 2018.

== Early life and education ==
Bewkes was born in Paterson, New Jersey, the middle son of Marjorie Louise (née Klenk) and Eugene Garrett Bewkes Jr., an executive at Norton Simon. He is of Dutch and German ancestry, was raised in Darien, Connecticut, and is a graduate of Deerfield Academy.

In 1974, he graduated from Yale University with a bachelor's degree in philosophy. According to college friend Gary Lucas, a guitarist who went on to collaborate with avant-garde acts like Captain Beefheart, at Yale in the early 1970s he fell in with "lunatic fringe types and free thinkers". Bill Moseley, another college friend who went on to a career in horror movies like Texas Chainsaw Massacre 2, stated, "I think of him as an artist first and foremost".

Upon graduation, he "tried his hand at documentary work for NBC News" before going to Stanford University to earn his MBA. He sits on both his alma maters' respective advisory boards. After school, he worked at a Sonoma vineyard winery and then took a job in New York City as a commercial banker in Citibank's shipping lending unit.

== Career ==
Leaving Citibank, he took a job at HBO then a small unit of Time Inc., where he was tasked with convincing hotels to subscribe to HBO and then sales director responsible for the launch of Cinemax. He rose to become CFO in 1986 and President and COO in 1991. In 1995 he became CEO of HBO, in which capacity he tripled company profits and "oversaw a fundamental shift in its content, away from just movies and fights and toward original shows like The Sopranos".

In 2002, he became chairman of Time Warner's entertainment and networks group. From 2005 to December 2007, he served as the top subordinate to Time Warner Chairman and CEO Dick Parsons. In 2008, Bewkes was selected as Parsons' successor, becoming CEO of Time Warner, and then board chair in 2009.

As CEO of Time Warner, Bewkes oversaw HBO, Turner Broadcasting System, Warner Bros. and New Line Cinema, while he oversaw the company's divestment from AOL, Time Inc. and Time Warner Cable. In January 2006, Bewkes and CBS Corporation head Les Moonves helped broker the deal that joined the CBS-owned UPN with The WB to form The CW Network.

On behalf of NYC Mayor Michael R. Bloomberg, Bewkes was one of the chairs of Media.NYC.2020, which reviewed the future of the global media industry, the implications for NYC, and suggested actionable next steps for the NYC government.

In October 2016, it was announced that AT&T would acquire Time Warner in a deal worth $84.5 billion. In July 2017, Bewkes announced he would leave Time Warner on completion of that merger. In November 2017, the U.S. Justice Department filed a lawsuit to block the acquisition, leaving Bewkes' future with the company unknown, but the merger closed in 2018 after the company won in court and the acquired company now assume the WarnerMedia name.

In December 2020, The Spectator magazine reflected on Bewkes being asked back in 2010 whether Netflix had any chance of taking over Hollywood. "His sarcastic answer deserves to go down as one of the all-time dumb predictions, 'Is the Albanian army going to take over the world?'". Within a decade Bewkes' modus operandi "has been torched and replaced by Netflix’s subscription-based streaming model", costing Time Warner shareholders billions of dollars in the process.

== Personal life ==
Bewkes, who lives in Greenwich, Connecticut, has been married three times. His first wife was Susan Frank Kelley, a law firm managing partner specializing in trusts and estates; they had one son. His second wife was Margaret Lowry Brim, a former real estate broker with William B. May Company, who was once a television producer and an aide to ABC president Roone Arledge; they had one son.

In 2017, he married his third wife Lisa Carco, Principal of Square One Communications + Design, Inc., a boutique marketing communications and digital design agency serving clients in the pharmaceutical and healthcare industries.

Business positions
Preceded by Richard D. Parsons	Time Warner CEO; 2008–2018	Succeeded by John Stankey
