= AT&T Communications =

American telecommunications company

- Type: Division
- Industry: Telecommunications; Technology
- Predecessor: AT&T Communications
- Founded: August 1, 2017; 9 years ago
- Headquarters: Whitacre Tower, Dallas, Texas, United States
- Key people: Jeff McElfresh (CEO)
- Products: Wireless; Mobile phone Broadband; IPTV; Digital television Fixed line telephone Home security
- Revenue: ▼US$ 144 billion (2018)
- Parent: AT&T
- Divisions: AT&T Mobility; AT&T Internet/Fiber
- Subsidiaries: AT&T Labs; AT&T Prepaid; AT&T Business Solutions; U-verse TV
- Website: www.att.com

AT&T Communications is a division of AT&T that focuses on mobile phone, broadband, fixed line telephone, home security, network security, and business services. The division houses AT&T Mobility, AT&T Internet, AT&T Phone, AT&T Long Distance, AT&T Labs, and AT&T Business Solutions.

== History and information ==
On July 28, 2017, AT&T announced a new AT&T Communications corporate division housing AT&T Mobility, DirecTV, U-verse, AT&T Business, AT&T Intellectual Property, AT&T Labs, Cricket Wireless, AT&T Digital Life, Vyatta, AT&T Adworks, and Technology and Operations Group.

In October 2016, AT&T announced a deal to acquire Time Warner worth $85.4 billion (including assumed Time Warner debt). The proposed deal would give AT&T significant holdings in the media industry; AT&T's competitor Comcast had previously acquired NBCUniversal in a similar bid to increase its media holdings, in concert with its ownership of television and internet providers. If approved by federal regulators, the merger would bring Time Warner's properties under the same umbrella as AT&T's telecommunication holdings, including satellite provider DirecTV.

By the end of July, the company announced that, effective August 1, a new structure was created before the acquisition would close. This structure has John Donovan take the title of CEO of the new AT&T Communications subsidiary division (incorporated that same day after a dividend payout). AT&T named John Stankey to run Time Warner media businesses and John Donovan as CEO of AT&T Communications ahead of the Time Warner acquisition. In November 2017, the U.S. Justice Department said it was moving to sue to block the AT&T-Time Warner merger. On November 20, 2017, the Department of Justice filed an antitrust lawsuit over the acquisition; Makan Delrahim stated that the deal would "greatly harm American consumers". AT&T asserts that this suit is a "radical and inexplicable departure from decades of antitrust precedent". On December 22, 2017, the merger agreement deadline was extended to June 21, 2018. On June 12, 2018, the AT&T-Time Warner merger was approved by a federal judge. Two days later, AT&T completed the acquisition of Time Warner for $85bn, and a day later the company was renamed WarnerMedia. On May 17, 2021, three years after acquiring WarnerMedia, AT&T announced plans to for a merger between WarnerMedia and Discovery, Inc., to create a new publicly traded entity: Warner Bros. Discovery. The merger was completed on April 8, 2022.

On July 10, 2018, AT&T announced that it would acquire cybersecurity startup AlienVault for an undisclosed amount. The acquisition was completed on August 22, 2018.

== AT&T Phone ==
AT&T Phone (formerly AT&T U-verse Voice) is a voice communication service delivered over AT&T's IP network (VoIP). This phone service is digital and provides a voicemail service accessed by *98 from the home number. Customers who subscribe to both AT&T Phone and U-verse TV get features such as call history on channel 9900, which displays the last 100 missed and answered calls on the customer's TV, and "Click to Call" from the TV history. AT&T Phone includes Caller ID, Call Blocking, Anonymous Call Blocker, and many other calling features. AT&T Phone was first available in Detroit, on January 22, 2008. This service is separate from their POTS based offerings (Long Distance, 1010ATT/1010288, Intra-Lata, and non-VOIP landlines)

== See also ==
- Long line (telecommunications)
