= Attempted acquisition of T-Mobile USA by AT&T =

Failed corporate acquisition

- Initiator: AT&T
- Target: T-Mobile USA
- Type: Full acquisition
- Cost: US$39 billion
- Initiated: March 20, 2011
- Status: Abandoned on December 19, 2011

On March 20, 2011, AT&T announced that it would purchase T-Mobile USA. On August 31, 2011, the Antitrust Division of the United States Department of Justice formally announced that it would seek to block the takeover, and filed a lawsuit to such effect in federal court. The bid was abandoned by AT&T on December 19, 2011.

== History ==
AT&T announced its intention to buy T-Mobile USA for $39 billion from Deutsche Telekom. The deal would come with 33.7 million subscribers, making AT&T the largest mobile phone company in the United States. If the deal were to go through, AT&T would have a 43% market share of mobile phones in the U.S., making AT&T significantly larger than any of its competitors.

On March 20, 2011, Deutsche Telekom AG accepted a US$39 billion stock and cash purchase offer from AT&T Inc. for T-Mobile USA, Inc.

According to an industry analyst, after the introduction of the iPhone in 2007, T-Mobile USA began to lose lucrative contract customers, dropping to 78.3 percent of subscribers in 2010, compared to 85% in 2006. T-Mobile USA's high churn rate of 3.2% compared to 1.2% at Verizon Wireless and AT&T Mobility, the needed investments in network upgrades and spectrum purchases were too risky given the drop in contract customers, reinforcing Deutsche Telekom's decision to sell.

=== Regulatory review and antitrust concerns ===
This purchase was required to undergo a regulatory review that the two companies expected to take at least 12 months. The deal required approval by the U.S. Department of Justice and the Federal Communications Commission. The FCC handled the review under WT Docket No. 11-65.

The Wall Street Journal reported on November 25 that AT&T had taken a $4 billion write-off ($3bn cash, $1bn in value of spectrum) in Q3 of 2011 in anticipation of the deal falling through.

=== Justice Department ===
United States v. AT&T, T-Mobile, and Deutsche Telekom was a lawsuit brought by the US Antitrust Division of the Department of Justice seeking to block the merger of AT&T Mobility and T-Mobile USA.

Had the purchase been completed, AT&T would have had a customer base of approximately 130 million users, making AT&T the largest wireless carrier in the United States. Regulators questioned the effects such a deal would have on both competitors and consumers, with critics stating the deal would likely increase prices for customers; interest group Public Knowledge stated the merger would cause "higher prices, fewer choices, [and] less innovation". AT&T chief executive Randall Stephenson however stated that the merger would increase network quality and would lead to large savings for the company. AT&T stated it may have to sell some assets to gain approval from regulators, but that they had done their "homework" on regulations.

=== FCC's 180-day countdown timer ===
On August 26, 2011, the FCC's "180-day timer" was restarted at day 83. This implied that around December 4, 2011, the FCC would announce their decision regarding AT&T's purchase of T-Mobile.

tmonews.com reported that the FCC was opposed to the merger. Both stories (November 22, 2011 6:22 pm EST) and (November 22, 2011 3:36 pm EST) used the same source material from The Wall Street Journal, AT&T Faces New Hurdle: Its $39 Billion T-Mobile Buy Is in Deeper Jeopardy as FCC Slaps on Extra Review (November 23, 2011). However, a Bloomberg Businessweek report that quoted the Associated Press, FCC chair opposes AT&T takeover of T-Mobile, indicated that it may be more accurate to say that the chairman of the Federal Communications Commission, Julius Genachowski, was opposed.

A November 26, 2011 Article in The Wall Street Journal ("AT&T Bickers With FCC on Merger Review" by Greg Bensinger) explained AT&T's logic in fighting the DOJ court case while withdrawing their application from the FCC: they thought they would get a new 180-day countdown timer if they re-applied. However, if upon re-application the balance of the original 180-day countdown timer was to be used, then the withdrawal date of November 23, 2011, would have left a balance of around eleven days remaining.

The FCC released their "Order Dismissing Applications and Staff Report: Staff Analysis and Findings (DA-11-1955A2.pdf)". From the end of main section:

266. Commission staff finds that the Applicants have failed to carry their burden of proving that the proposed transaction, on balance, will serve the public interest. Upon Careful examination summarized in this document, the staff concludes that significant harms to competition are likely to result, primarily in the form of increased prices for consumers, reduced incentives for innovation, an decreased consumer choice. In addition, there are serious allegations of other harms that require further investigation. Staff further finds that the bulk of the Applicants' proffered benefits are inadequately supported by the data supplied, achievable through means other than the elimination of a competitor, or otherwise not cognizable under the Commission's public interest standard. Staff therefore recommends that the Commission designate the proposed transaction for hearing pursuant to § 309(e) of the Communications Act.

=== Senate hearing ===
The Senate Judiciary Subcommittee on Antitrust, Competition Policy and Consumer Rights held a hearing on the acquisition of T-Mobile USA by AT&T in May. During the hearing senators questioned the companies CEOs on the effects of the merger on competition and other issues. At one point during the hearing the two companies denied that they were competitors.

Sen. Amy Klobuchar asked if AT&T was prepared to offer its customers T-Mobile's current pricing plans. Stephenson said AT&T would honor existing T-Mobile contracts, even when customers renewed, as long as they bought similar phones.

Gigi Sohn, president of Public Knowledge, testified at the hearing. Sohn stated that at least 1,000 people had signed the group's petition opposing the merger and that more than 5,000 people had written to the Federal Communications Commission opposing the deal.

=== Withdrawal of merger bid ===
On December 19, 2011, AT&T announced that it would permanently end its merger bid after a "thorough review of its options" which included a negotiation to sell a large portion of T-Mobile assets to Leap Wireless in attempts to alleviate concerns by the FCC regarding a monopoly, but to no avail. The announcement included an assertion that the failure of the acquisition would increase costs to consumers and harm innovation in the wireless market. As per the original acquisition agreement, Deutsche Telekom would receive $3 billion in cash as well as access to $1 billion worth of AT&T-held wireless spectrum.

According to a February 2012 regulatory filing, AT&T CEO Randall Stephenson's compensation was cut by "more than $2 million" in response to the effect the failed purchase attempt had on AT&T's bottom line. His total compensation for 2011 was $22 million, an 18.5% drop from the $27 million he received the previous year.

== Reception ==
Reaction to the announced merger generated both support as well as opposition among various groups and communities.

The merger garnered support from a wide number of civil rights, environmental, and business organizations. These included the NAACP, League of United Latin American Citizens, Gay & Lesbian Alliance Against Defamation (GLAAD), and the Sierra Club. Labor organizations such as the AFL–CIO, Teamsters, and the Communications Workers of America also voiced support for the merger. These organizations pointed to AT&T's commitment to labor, social, and environmental standards. Many of these organizations also cited how the merger was likely to accelerate 4G wireless deployment, thus helping underserved communities such as rural areas and disadvantaged urban communities. The NAACP, who received a $1,000,000 donation from AT&T in 2009 said the merger would have "advance[d] increased access to affordable and sustainable wireless broadband services and in turn stimulate[d] job creation and civic engagement throughout our country."

As of August 2, the governors of 26 states had written letters supporting the merger. On July 27 the attorneys general of Utah, Alabama, Arkansas, Georgia, Kentucky, Michigan, Mississippi, North Dakota, South Dakota, West Virginia, and Wyoming sent a joint letter of support to the FCC. As of August 2011, state regulatory agencies in Arizona and Louisiana had approved the acquisition.

A diverse group of industry and public-interest organizations opposed AT&T's merger with T-Mobile. While AT&T's chief executive, Randall Stephenson, expressed his confidence in the deal being approved based on the benefit to the public of expanding wireless access and relatively robust competition in the wireless market, analysts said the deal stood a good chance of being rejected by federal regulators.

Consumer groups including Public Knowledge, Consumers Union, Free Press and the Media Access Project were publicly opposed to the AT&T merger. These groups have influence with Democrats at the Federal Communications Commission and in Congress. These organizations feared that the merger would raise prices and stifle innovation by consolidating so much of the wireless industry into one company. Free Press and Public Knowledge started letter-writing campaigns against the deal.

Internet companies were generally skeptical of the merger because it would have left them with fewer counter-parties to negotiate with for getting their content and applications to customers. The merger could leave them dependent on just two: AT&T and Verizon. The Computer & Communication Industry Association (CCIA), which included Google, Microsoft, Yahoo, and eBay among its members was opposed to the merger. "A deal like this, if not blocked on antitrust grounds, is of deep concern to all the innovative businesses that build everything from apps to handsets. It would be hypocritical for our nation to talk about unleashing innovation on one hand and then stand by as threats to innovation like this are proposed," said Ed Black, head of the CCIA.

The Rural Cellular Association (RCA), a trade group representing roughly 100 mobile carriers located in rural areas, expressed its opposition to the proposed merger between AT&T and T-Mobile, saying that the merger would stifle competition, harm innovation, and lead to higher prices.

Sprint Nextel also announced its opposition to the merger. Sprint said the deal would severely reduce competition in the United States cell phone industry.

=== Fight the Merger ===
Fight the Merger was a movement, started by the law firm Bursor & Fisher to oppose the merger. The strategy of the movement was to recruit AT&T customers to file arbitration demands with the American Arbitration Association under the Clayton Antitrust Act against AT&T, pursuant to their arbitration clause. Martha Neil, writing for the ABA Journal, described the movement as a response to the Supreme Court's April 2011 ruling in AT&T Mobility v. Concepcion, in which the court upheld AT&T's arbitration clause that prohibited class actions. The goal of the movement was to win an injunction against the merger by any arbitrator.

AT&T criticized the strategy, saying that their clause did not give arbitrators authority to block the merger. AT&T also filed 8 lawsuits to prevent arbitration. However, the American Arbitration Association agreed to conduct the arbitrations.

== Effects on consumers ==
=== Frequencies ===
AT&T and T-Mobile use different 3G radio frequencies on their wireless networks. This could mean that T-Mobile customers would need to eventually replace their 3G phones had this merger gone through. Some users were declining to upgrade their phones due to this issue. AT&T had plans to shift T-Mobile users over to a different 3G frequency and that T-Mobile users would need to buy new phones. AT&T claims that this shift would have been spread over several years to allow consumers to replace phones at the time they normally would do so.

== Leaked documents ==
On August 11, 2011, a lawyer involved in the merger inadvertently posted a document regarding the AT&T T-Mobile merger that could undermine the reasons AT&T had previously stated for the merger.
