= United States v. AT&T (2019) =

U.S. v. AT&T (2019)
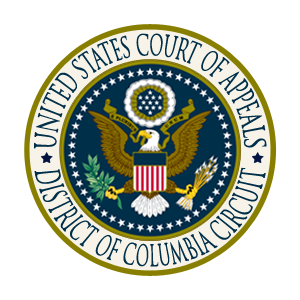
- Court: United States Court of Appeals for the District of Columbia Circuit
- Full case name: United States of America v. AT&T Inc., et al.
- Argued: December 6, 2018
- Decided: February 26, 2019
- Citation: 916 F.3d 1029

Case history
- Prior history: 310 F.Supp.3d 161 (D.D.C., 2018)

Holding
- The U.S. government was unable to prove that the takeover of TimeWarner by AT&T was harmful to competition or consumer welfare.

Court membership
- Judges sitting: Judith W. Rogers, Robert L. Wilkins, David B. Sentelle

Laws applied
- Antitrust law

United States v. AT&T, 916 F.3d 1029 (2019), was a ruling of the United States Court of Appeals for the District of Columbia Circuit, which prevented the U.S. government from blocking a merger between AT&T and Time Warner, thus creating the WarnerMedia conglomerate. The court found that regulators were unable to prove harm to consumers per the requirements of United States antitrust law.

== Background ==
AT&T first announced plans to acquire Time Warner in October 2016. The acquisition would give AT&T significant holdings in the media content industry for the first time, and would allow the company to compete more fully with its primary telecommunications rival, Comcast, which had recently acquired NBCUniversal under a similar strategy. The proposal attracted criticism because AT&T could potentially use its expanded influence over both media content and delivery networks to prioritize its own content or discriminate against that of its competitors.

In February 2017, Time Warner shareholders voted to approve the takeover by AT&T, and Federal Communications Commission Chairman Ajit Pai refrained from having that agency review the merger, so a full governmental review was conducted by the Department of Justice. President Donald Trump voiced his opposition to the merger, believing that it would grant more influence to news organizations like CNN that had criticized him, though Trump Administration officials vowed to review the deal without prejudice.

In November 2017, the Department of Justice filed an antitrust lawsuit to block the acquisition. Makan Delrahim, assistant Attorney General of the agency's Antitrust Division, stated that the deal would "greatly harm American consumers". The Department sought an injunction to prevent the merger from being completed.

== District court proceedings ==
The case was first heard at the United States District Court for the District of Columbia in 2018. In June of that year, Judge Richard J. Leon ruled in favor of AT&T, holding that the government had failed to provide evidence that the proposed takeover of Time Warner by AT&T would reduce competition. In a ruling spanning nearly 100 pages, Leon held that recent developments in the media content marketplace required a more precise antitrust analysis, with AT&T's arguments in favor of the merger being more convincing and based upon current marketplace realities.

Leon ruled that the Department of Justice had failed to show that the Time Warner media properties would gain unfair leverage over the marketplace after becoming part of the AT&T conglomerate, or that media consumers would be harmed, or that AT&T would use its control of telecommunications delivery networks to discriminate against other companies' content. Thus, the government's attempt to prevent the takeover was denied. The acquisition of Time Warner by AT&T was finalized two days later, creating the newly-named conglomerate WarnerMedia.

In July 2018, the Department of Justice appealed the decision to the United States Court of Appeals for the District of Columbia Circuit. Even though the merger was in progress by that point, the agency appealed in the belief that the newly combined company could easily be separated again if the appeal were to be successful.

== Circuit Court opinion ==
At the D.C. Circuit Court, the Department of Justice argued that the lower District Court ruling to allow the merger was "contrary to fundamental economic logic and the evidence". For this hearing, the government stated that if it won the appeal, it would only require the newly formed company to sell its Turner Networks operations; and if the government lost the appeal it would allow its objection to the merger to expire the following year along with the associated consent decree.

In February 2019, the Circuit Court unanimously upheld the lower court ruling in favor of the takeover of Time Warner by AT&T, agreeing that the merger would not have a negative impact on either consumers or competition. This ruling was based on the requirements of the Clayton Act, which permits a merger of companies that do not directly compete with each other (also known as a vertical merger). The Circuit Court agreed with the lower court's ruling that the combined company would not harm competition in the media marketplace.

The Department of Justice decided against appealing this circuit court ruling to the U.S. Supreme Court, so the consent decree in which it stated its opposition the merger expired, and the merger went forward.

== Impact and subsequent events ==
The takeover of Time Warner by AT&T, and the decisions in court to allow it to proceed, attracted widespread criticism from opponents of media consolidation. Legal experts found that the effects of the ruling for antitrust law in the media/telecommunications sphere were inconclusive. The government's attempts to prevent the formation of large and abusive companies in that marketplace were based on economic arguments that may have become outdated, while that marketplace had converged in ways that required new arguments and analyses of the economic effects of mergers and takeovers.

The newly combined company only lasted for about three years; in 2022 AT&T spun out WarnerMedia as a short-lived independent company, which then promptly merged with Discovery Inc. That deal was instantly approved by the Department of Justice, and the resulting company is now called Warner Bros. Discovery. Consequently, AT&T ended its formal and direct involvement in the media content sector after just three years. Meanwhile, the new Warner Bros. Discovery immediately faced economic pressures that inspired discussions for yet another media consolidation merger, potentially with Paramount Global, less than two years later.
