= List of HBO international channels =

HBO
- Type: Pay television network

Programming
- Picture format: 1080i (HDTV) (downscaled to 16:9 576i for the SDTV feed)

Ownership
- Owner: Warner Bros. Discovery
- Parent: Home Box Office, Inc. (managed by Warner Bros.)
- Sister channels: Cinemax; Red by HBO (2010–2021)

Links
- Website: www.hbo.com

Home Box Office (HBO)—originally established on November 8, 1972, as a premium cable television network in the United States—has, since 1991, expanded into a family of international pay television channels presently owned by Warner Bros. Discovery subsidiary Home Box Office, Inc. and operated through sister subsidiary Warner Bros. Discovery International or owned by third-party media companies through programming and brand licensing partnerships.

In countries where an HBO-branded network does not exist in its own right, the network's programming is licensed instead to domestic pay television services or through a basic cable channel; all of which are permitted to refer to themselves as the "Home of HBO" since 2010, such as with Sky Atlantic and Now TV in parts of Europe, Fox Showcase and Binge in Australia, and Amazon Prime Video in France.

Like its flagship U.S. channel, most of the international channels maintain a subscription-based model, in which they do not accept traditional advertising and offer programming that includes theatrically released motion pictures, original television programs (both licensed by the U.S. service and produced for individual regional channels), made-for-cable movies, documentaries, and occasional stand-up comedy and concert specials. While HBO maintains international distribution rights for its original programs, the terms of its licensing agreements with film studios only retains it the right to broadcast them within the United States and the territories of Puerto Rico, Guam and the U.S. Virgin Islands, therefore film rights for the international channels must be licensed separately.

== Branded services ==
=== The Americas ===
==== Brazil ====
HBO Brazil was launched in 1991 as a partnership between Grupo Abril's TVA, Time Warner and Sony. It was developed as an analogue pay channel, but used UHF broadcast frequencies and ran its programming for nine hours each day. After the Brazilian financial crisis of the late 1990s, Grupo Abril sold its share in the network to Time Warner.

==== Canada ====
Canadian rights to HBO-owned and -distributed programming are held by Bell Media, the mass-media unit of telecom company Bell Canada. (Note: By coincidence, Bell Canada was formerly part-owned by WarnerMedia's 2018–2022 parent company AT&T until 1975; however Bell's relationship with HBO predated AT&T's acquisition of WarnerMedia. Bell Media and its predecessors had also had a separate partnership with Discovery, Inc. covering Discovery Channel Canada and related services, dating back to 1995, prior to the merger that formed WBD.) Programming is offered through Bell's Crave pay television service, which includes an HBO-branded multiplex channel that launched in 2008 and features the U.S. channel's original programming; the over-the-top Crave streaming service; and Bell's French-language pay service Super Écran, along with occasional airings of library programs on the company's basic cable channels. Outside of the required brand licensing to use the HBO trademarks and logo, HBO parent Warner Bros. Discovery does not have an ownership interest in these services, and, as such, the Canadian service is the only HBO channel that WBD does not operate.

The HBO multiplex channel was launched as HBO Canada on October 30, 2008, as a joint venture between two regional Canadian pay television services: Astral Media-owned The Movie Network (now Crave), which operated in provinces east of the Ontario-Manitoba border, and Corus Entertainment-owned Movie Central, which operated in provinces west of the aforementioned delineated border as well as the territories. Prior to that date, both services had regularly featured HBO programming on their other channels, however some programs had aired on (or were later syndicated to) other broadcast or basic cable channels.

Most Canadian licensing rights to HBO programming have been consolidated under Bell Media after the company assumed television rights and established streaming rights to the HBO back-catalog following the completion of its acquisition of Astral Media in 2014. The Canadian HBO service would become tied to a single national pay service, when, on November 19, 2015, Corus Entertainment reached an agreement with Bell in which it would agree to cancel Movie Central's pay television license, and sell the network's distribution rights and subscriber base to Bell for C$211 million, in order to allow The Movie Network to expand into Western Canada. In turn, Bell expanded its programming agreement with HBO, obtaining exclusive distribution rights to the HBO programming library on its linear television channels, video-on-demand and digital platforms. Bell assumed full control of HBO Canada on March 1, 2016, coinciding with TMN replacing Movie Central on providers in the western half of Canada upon commencing distribution as a national service.

Crave also holds domestic linear pay television and streaming rights to the majority of theatrical films that premiere in the U.S. on HBO, although films from Warner Bros. Pictures, 20th Century Studios and Universal Pictures air primarily on Crave, Starz and their corresponding linear multiplex channels; the Canadian HBO linear channel exclusively airs the network's original series and films.

==== The Caribbean ====
HBO Caribbean offers English-language broadcasts of HBO material geared towards the English- and Dutch-speaking Caribbean audience. HBO launched the channel to replace the Spanish foreign-language feed, which formerly served the English-speaking Caribbean market. HBO Caribbean is carried on cable providers such as Flow, Digicel, Canal+, Cable Bahamas and Multi-Choice TV.

==== Latin America ====
Originally known as HBO OLÉ, HBO Latin America Group originated in 1991 as a partnership between Venezuelan broadcaster Omnivisión and HBO. The channel was initially available to cable and satellite providers across Central and South America, and the Caribbean. HBO OLÉ reached a break-even profit by 1993, and had about 500,000 subscribers by 1994; that year, a secondary channel was launched, along with a Portuguese feed for Brazil. Sony, The Walt Disney Company and Universal Pictures later joined the partnership. Omnivisión eventually sold its share in the channel to Time Warner.

=== Asia ===
==== Southeast Asia ====
HBO Asia was originally co-owned by UIP Pay TV, Sony Pictures Entertainment, Time Warner and SingTel. Based in Singapore, it launched in 1993 and initially served only the Philippines and Thailand. HBO Asia expanded to incorporate feeds in Mandarin Chinese, Thai and Indonesian, encompassing 23 countries across Asia.

=== Europe ===
==== Central and Eastern Europe ====
HBO Europe was originally launched in Hungary in 1991 on KábelKom, a company that was created in 1991 as a joint venture between HBO parent Time Warner and United Communications International to provide cable television service to Hungary. The channel's programming was originally transmitted via microwave relay (in the same manner as the flagship HBO channel in the United States from 1972 to 1975), due to the economic issues in using satellite delivery to a country with a small population. By late 1994, HBO Hungary had a subscriber base of 160,000 households. Since that point, HBO has expanded into 15 European markets including Poland, the Czech Republic, Slovakia, Romania, Bulgaria, Moldova, Croatia, Slovenia, Serbia, Bosnia and Herzegovina, Montenegro and North Macedonia.

== Former services ==
=== Asia ===
==== Nepal, India, Pakistan and the Maldives ====
HBO South Asia was a regional pay television network operated by Home Box Office Inc.'s HBO Asia unit, which aired theatrical feature films from America and South Asia. Singapore based HBO Channels are telecast in Nepal. The network ceased operations on 15 December 2020

=== Europe ===
==== Netherlands ====
HBO Netherlands launched on 9 February 2012 over cable television provider Ziggo, as a three-channel multiplex service featuring HBO original programs airing on a day-behind basis from their initial United States broadcast. A local version of HBO Go was also made available to subscribers of the service. HBO Netherlands was available to subscribers of Ziggo, KPN, UPC, XS4ALL, Telfort, fibre providers Glashart Media and Vodafone Glasvezel and satellite broadcaster CanalDigitaal.

On 28 September 2016, HBO Netherlands announced that it would cease broadcasting on 31 December 2016.

Following the 31 December 2016 closure of HBO Netherlands, cable television provider Ziggo, as part of its acquisition of the broadcasting licenses to the network's content for the Dutch market, began offering HBO programs on its video on demand service Ziggo Movies & Series XL. Ziggo's rights to HBO programming expired on 31 December 2021, in anticipation of the 2022 HBO Max launch in the Netherlands.

==== Nordic region ====
On August 15, 2012, HBO announced plans to launch HBO Nordic, a multiplatform video distribution service serving Norway, Denmark, Sweden and Finland that was created through a joint venture with Peter Ekelund's Parsifal International. The video on demand service launched in December 2012. HBO programming also airs in Iceland on Stöð (Channel 2).

HBO Nordic announced that the service would be dissolved and was folded into HBO Max, launching on October 26, 2021. All HBO Nordic subscribers were automatically transferred to HBO Max and new subscribers between October 26 and November 30 would have 50% off for a lifetime as long as they do not cancel their subscription. People with the old HBO Nordic application on their phones were prompted to install HBO Max instead.

==== Spain ====
HBO programs were previously broadcast in Spain on pay television service Canal+.

In 2016, HBO launched a standalone streaming service called HBO España, which is the Spanish equivalent of HBO Now and HBO Nordic. It also has been replaced by HBO Max simultaneously with Nordics version of the service on 2021.

==== Portugal ====
From September 2015 to December 2018, local premium television channel TVCine e Séries broadcast the majority of HBO's programs. A separate Portuguese streaming service, HBO Portugal, was launched in 2019. According to a platform press release, in 2019, Game of Thrones and Chernobyl were the most viewed programs on HBO Portugal. HBO Portugal was replaced by HBO Max on 8 March 2022.

=== Oceania ===
==== New Zealand ====
Sky Movies in New Zealand originally operated as a joint venture between HBO and Sky Network Television. The channel was renamed HBO in 1993; Time Warner later sold its share in the service to Sky in 1998, and it was renamed back to Sky Movies. HBO programming is currently shown by Sky channel HBO (formerly called SoHo) and its subscription streaming service Neon, in New Zealand. The service will be scheduled to be ceased on June 16, 2026.

== Program licensing partnerships ==
=== Europe ===
==== United Kingdom, Germany, Austria, Switzerland, Luxembourg, Italy and Ireland ====
Under a long-term agreement until March 26, 2026, between HBO and Sky Group (Comcast), Sky operates Sky Atlantic which broadcasts the majority of HBO's programming. Sky Atlantic is available in the UK, Austria, Switzerland, Germany, Luxembourg, Ireland and Italy.

In February 2011, Sky Atlantic launched on the Sky platforms in the United Kingdom and Ireland, which maintains a distribution deal with HBO to offer the majority of its programming on the channel. Under the five-year agreement between HBO and Sky, newer HBO programs will air on Sky Atlantic before airing on other television channels within the United Kingdom and Ireland.

Prior to 2011, TG4 in Ireland had a long-term agreement to broadcast HBO programming free-to-air, this ceased following the creation of Sky Atlantic.

In Italian-speaking Switzerland, HBO shows are broadcast on RSI La 1.

==== France ====
On November 13, 2008, Orange launched Orange Cinéma Séries (renamed OCS on 22 September 2012), a five channel package, dedicated to movie and series. The same year, Orange signed a long-term agreement to distribute all HBO productions in France. Originally, HBO programs were shared by OCS Max, OCS Novo, and OCS Choc but on October 10, 2013, OCS replaced OCS Novo with OCS City, to be the main channel for HBO productions in France. HBO productions were also available on OCS streaming service. In 2019, Orange and HBO extended their deal to give OCS the complete exclusivity on the HBO catalogue. Before that, HBO was able to make deals with other French channels for the rerun rights of their programs.

In December 2022, OCS's deal with HBO ended, and productions were removed from the service beginning in January 2023. The same month, Warner Bros. Discovery and Amazon Prime Video announced the launch of the "Warner Pass", an add-on "channel" subscription that will include past and upcoming HBO programming, with Prime Video becoming the new home for HBO in France, after previously signed a deal with Warner Bros. Discovery to distribute the HBO Max programs owned by the company in October 2022. The channel will be launched in March 2023. Selected programs (like The Last of Us) will be given a release without a subscription to the channel.

In French-speaking Switzerland, it also showed on RTS in English and with French dubbing, along with French subtitles, and soon after on the website. It is only accessible from Switzerland.

==== CIS ====
Since 2017, Amedia broadcast the majority of the HBO programming in most of the CIS territories, except in Russia, where broadcasting ceased in 2022 as a result of the Russian invasion of Ukraine.

==== Greece and Cyprus ====
Nova has a long-term agreement with HBO to broadcast the majority of HBO programs in Greece and Cyprus. In 2015, Nova Cinema announced a new output deal with HBO to broadcast the biggest hit series in Greece and Cyprus at the same time with the US. The fifth season of Game of Thrones premiered on 12 April 2015 on HBO and Nova Cinema at the same time.

==== Belgium and Luxembourg ====
On February 19, 2018, Belgian telecommunications company Proximus announced a deal to carry the BeTV bouquet for the distribution of HBO programs in French-speaking Belgium. HBO shows airs on Be 1, nicknamed Home of HBO.

For Flanders, Streamz, which is owned by Telenet and DPG Media, broadcasts HBO shows.

==== Baltics ====
Since September 1, 2018, telecommunications provider Telia has added HBO streaming services to their networks in Estonia and Lithuania, while Tet carries HBO programming in Latvia.

==== Malta ====
Cable television network Melita More shows several HBO programs in Malta since 2011.

=== Asia ===
==== Malaysia ====
Astro Citra is a Malay version of HBO Asia. It is featuring local & international movie with Malay and English subtitles.

==== Middle East and North Africa ====
After signing a deal with HBO, on 1 February 2016 United Arab Emirates-based subscription television provider OSN launched OSN First HD - Home of HBO, a premium channel that specifically airs HBO productions including movies, serials and others. Since OSN's services are pan-regional, the channel is available to multiple countries in the MENA region.

As of 2019, most HBO programs are broadcast on OSN First Series' "HBO Night" block following a rebranding of OSN's channels, and in 2022 OSN launched OSN Showcase (now OSN TV Showcase).

==== Japan ====
In Japan, U-Next reached a deal to carry HBO and HBO Max original programs in Japan beginning in April 2021. This replaced a previous deal between HBO and Amazon Prime Video Japan.

=== Africa ===
HBO signed an exclusive deal with the South African streaming service Showmax owned by MultiChoice Group. This deal includes exclusive streaming rights to every single HBO title and new episodes to be added the same day they air in the United States.

The HBO shows are broadcast on Canal+ for the Francophone market.

=== Oceania ===
==== Australia ====
Fox Showcase, an Australian premium television service that launched in 1995, began airing HBO original programming in 2012, through a licensed distribution arrangement with subscription television provider Foxtel. Prior to this, limited HBO content was broadcast through the now-defunct Movie Network, which was founded by HBO (through Time Warner), Village Roadshow, Metro-Goldwyn-Mayer and Disney–ABC International Television. HBO Originals are also available on demand via Foxtel services Foxtel Now and Binge.

== International SVOD services ==
In 2005, the HBO Mobile wireless service launched via Vodafone in the United Kingdom, Ireland, Belgium, the Netherlands, Germany, Austria, Switzerland, Italy, Spain and South Africa, and via SK Telecom in Korea in 2006. In 2006, HBO's subscription video-on-demand service HBO On Demand launched in Israel on HOT, marking the first standalone HBO service to be offered outside the United States. The service launched in the United Kingdom in 2007 via BT Vision, TalkTalk TV and Virgin Media, and then rolled out to Cyprus in 2008 through PrimeTv of PrimeTel Ltd. In Australia, HBO Originals are carried on Foxtel's Foxtel Now and Binge services. In India, Home Box Office's self-owned Originals are carried on 21st Century Fox's Hotstar from 2016 to 2023, which rebranded to Disney+ Hotstar since early 2020 following Disney's acquisition of much of 21st Century Fox's assets, it later moved to Viacom18's JioCinema on 27 April 2023. In Southeast Asia, South Asia (excluding India and Pakistan) and Korea, HBO Asia launched HBO Go starting from 2013 in Hong Kong and gradually expanded it to countries across the region in partnership with local telecom giants for those subscribing to HBO TV network through those partners, only to relaunch it as OTT subscription service since 2016. It is slated and expected to be replaced by the streaming service which encompass all WBD properties named Max (which would be a proposed merger between HBO Max and Discovery+) on November 19, 2024, following the merger of parent company WarnerMedia with Discovery, Inc. to form and become Warner Bros. Discovery.
