= Gunpowder & Sky =

American media production and distribution company

- Type: Private
- Industry: Entertainment
- Founded: January 2016; 10 years ago
- Founders: Van Toffler, Floris Bauer
- Headquarters: Los Angeles, California
- Area served: Global
- Key people: Van Toffler, Floris Bauer
- Products: Motion pictures; Documentaries; Podcasts; Television; Experiential events; Free ad-supported streaming television
- Brands: Alien Nation; ALTER; Cut; DUST
- Website: gunpowdersky.com

Gunpowder & Sky is a Los Angeles–based independent studio that develops and produces films, television series, podcasts, and live and experiential events. Founded in 2016 by Van Toffler and Floris Bauer, the company operates offices in Los Angeles and New York, and works across documentaries, unscripted, music-driven, and scripted projects.

== History ==
In January 2016, Van Toffler (former CEO of Viacom Media Networks Music Group), Floris Bauer (former global head of strategy at entertainment company Endemol, and Otter Media), formed Gunpowder & Sky as an independent studio. The name "Gunpowder & Sky" comes from a lyric from the Aimee Mann song, "4th of July."

In February 2016, Gunpowder & Sky, along with Comcast Ventures, invested in Cut, a creator of digital video content.

In March 2016, Gunpowder & Sky invested in viral video producer Shareability.

In September 2016, the company acquired independent film distribution company Filmbuff.

In November 2016, Gunpowder & Sky launched DUST, a sci-fi streaming service featuring short films, series, and behind-the-scenes content.

In January 2017, the company acquired production company Supergravity Pictures.

In August 2018, Gunpowder & Sky launched DUSTx, a free streaming sci-fi service on Roku.

In April 2020, Gunpowder & Sky formed a joint venture with talent manager and production company Circle of Confusion to produce sci-fi and horror projects.

In March 2021, the company signed a two-year first-look deal with the WarnerMedia cable network to provide documentaries and docuseries from Gunpowder & Sky's library to HBO and HBO Max.

In September 2021, the company announced the launch of the DUST Channel on streaming service Tubi.

In March 2022, the company released Gaming Wall Street, an HBO Max docuseries examining the GameStop stock surge and the forces reshaping Wall Street.

In May 2022, the company announced its horror brand ALTER was also launching as a free ad-supported streaming television (FAST) channel, on connected TV platforms including Samsung TV Plus, STIRR and Redbox.

In 2023, the company produced Heist 88, a crime drama inspired by a real-life 1988 Chicago bank heist starring Courtney B. Vance, for TV network Showtime.

In October 2023, the company began production on a Myspace Documentary featuring the rise and fall of the pioneering social media platform.

In February 2024, the company produced the Dolly Parton special Dolly Parton's Pet Gala for CBS. The company also produced the 2024 boy band documentary Larger Than Life: Reign of the Boybands.

In March 2025, Gunpowder & Sky's Van Toffler produced the Ringo Starr special, Ringo and Friends at the Ryman, with Starr and T Bone Burnett.

In June 2025, the company signed a multi-year production deal to produce the MTV Video Music Awards.

== Business ==
Gunpowder & Sky is a production company that produces feature films, documentaries, TV programs, podcasts, and live and experiential events. The company also operates a variety of genre-focused free ad-supported streaming television (FAST) channels.

=== Feature films ===
Notable feature films produced by the company include Her Smell (2018), Hearts Beat Loud (2018), and The Little Hours (2017).

=== Documentaries ===
Notable documentaries include Everybody's Everything (2019), Last Exit: Space (2022), Sometimes When We Touch: The Reign, Ruin and Resurrection of Soft Rock (2023), Sheryl (2022), Call Me Miss Cleo (2022), I Wanna Rock: The ‘80s Metal Dream (2023), 69: The Saga of Danny Hernandez, and Larger Than Life: Reign of the Boybands (2024).

=== TV programs ===
TV programs produced include 50 States of Fright (2020), MTV's Video Music Awards, the 2025 CBS special Ringo and Friends at the Ryman, Dolly Parton's Pet Gala for CBS, and Words + Music TV (2025).

=== Podcasts ===
Gunpowder & Sky produced the DUST podcast from 2019 to 2021. The company also produces podcasts for streaming service Audible, for a variety of podcasts including episodes of the Words + Music series.

=== Live and experiential events ===
In December 2022, the company produced a virtual reality concert experience reimagining the legacy of rapper The Notorious B.I.G.. Entitled The Notorious B.I.G.: Sky’s the Limit, it was shown in Meta Platform's Horizon Worlds. In July 2024, the company produced the virtual reality concert experience Sabrina Carpenter: A VR Concert, also shown in Meta Platform's Horizon Worlds.

=== FAST channels ===
The company's FAST branded channels include: the sci-fi channel DUST, the paranormal documentary channel Alien Nation, the horror channel ALTER, and the unscripted viral content channel Cut. The channels are available on a variety of paid and free streaming devices and services.
