= Szabolcs Thuróczy =

Hungarian actor (born 1971)

- Born: 24 December 1971 (age 54); Nyíregyháza, Hungary
- Education: Attila József University
- Occupation: Actor
- Years active: 2012–present

Szabolcs Thuróczy (born 24 December 1971) is a Hungarian actor.

== Biography ==
Thuróczy was born on 24 December 1971 in Nyíregyháza. His mother is a primary school teacher. His father is a lawyer, and his older brother also has a law degree. In 1990, he started studying law in the evening program of the Attila József University in Szeged, graduating in 1996. He has never worked in the legal field. On the other hand, he has no formal qualification in acting.

In 1990, while still attending high school, he responded to a casting call for students regarding a role in an adaptation of Danton's Death by Georg Büchner, directed by Erzsi Gaál at the Zsigmond Móricz Theatre in Nyíregyháza. His audition was successful, which marked the beginning of his acting career.

From 1990 and 1992, Thuróczy played at the Zsigmond Móricz Theatre. During this period, he performed in Shakespeare's Titus Andronicus, one of Sándor Zsótér's early directorial works. In 1994–95, he was a member of the Szigligeti Theatre in Szolnok, under the directorship of György Spiró. He moved to Budapest in 1995, where he first appeared in László Garaczi's adaptation of The Misanthrope, directed by Zsótér at the Szkéné Theatre. After his graduation, he spent one year in London. In 1998, he joined Béla Pintér and Company, becoming one of its founding members.

Thuróczy made his film debut with a starring role in Anarchisták (2001), directed by Tamás Tóth. He also participated in writing the film's screenplay.

== Personal life ==
He has a son from a former relationship, Máté Martinkovics (born 1994), whom he first met when Martinkovics was ten years old. Later, he also became an actor; they played father and son in the 2025 television series Bróker Marcsi. He also has two daughters.

Thuróczy has been a supporter of the football club Ferencvárosi TC since childhood. He played football during his school years.

== Acting credits ==
=== Film ===
Year	Title	Role	Notes
2001	Anarchisták	Gavrilo	Also co-writer
2011	Csicska	István Balogh	Short film
2014	White God (Fehér isten)	Old man	
2016	Kills on Wheels (Tiszta szívvel)	Rupaszov	
2019	Comrade Drakulich (Drakulics elvtárs)	Miklós Esvégh	
2021	Becsúszó szerelem	Alex	
2022	Szia, Életem!	Barna Keserű	
2022	Larry	Zoltán Somogyi	
2024	És mi van Tomival?	Sanyi	

=== Television ===
Year	Title	Role	Notes
2011–2013	Társas játék	Iván Béres	
2015–2018	Aranyélet	Attila Miklósi	
2021–2023	Tiltott zónák	Himself	Documentary series
2022	The Informant (A besúgó)	Imre Kiss	
2022–2023	A Király	Sándor Hódos	Miniseries
2023–2024	Marsra magyar!	Laci Nagybani	
2025	Bróker Marcsi		Miniseries

== Awards and nominations ==
Year	Award	Category	Work	Result	Ref.
2002	Award of the Municipality of Budapest	Best Male Performance	Öl, butít (Béla Pintér and Company)	Won	
2016	Hungarian Film Awards	Best Actor in a Film	Szerdai gyerek	Nominated	
2016	Golden Medal Awards	Actor of the Year	—N/a	Won	
2017	Hungarian Film Awards	Best Actor in a Film	Kills on Wheels	Won	
2017	Hungarian Film Critics' Awards	Best Actor	Kills on Wheels	Won	
2019	Hungarian Film Awards	Best Actor in a Television series	Aranyélet	Won	
2022	Hungarian Motion Picture Awards	Best Actor	Szia, Életem!	Nominated	
2023	Hungarian Motion Picture Awards	Best Supporting Actor	Larry	Won	
