= HBO Europe =

Group of television channels owned by HBO

- Broadcast area: Central Europe; Southern Europe; Southeastern Europe
- Headquarters: Budapest, Hungary (Central Europe & Portugal); Stockholm, Sweden (Nordic countries and Spain); Prague, Czech Republic (original programming)

Ownership
- Parent: Home Box Office, Inc. (Warner Bros. Discovery)
- Sister channels: HBO 2 HBO 3 Cinemax; Cinemax 2

History
- Launched: September 28, 1991

Links
- Website: hbo-europe.com (Archived via Wayback Machine)

HBO Europe is a premium television group of channels by HBO, owned by Warner Bros. Discovery. It is available as a group of film channels and streaming television services in Bosnia and Herzegovina, Bulgaria, Croatia, the Czech Republic, Hungary, Moldova, Montenegro, North Macedonia, Poland, Romania, Serbia, Slovakia and Slovenia, while VOD-only services with original programming are available in Denmark, Finland, Norway, Portugal, Spain and Sweden.

The administration of Central European countries and Portugal is headquartered in Budapest, Hungary; meanwhile the Nordic and Spain services operate from Stockholm, Sweden. The company maintains regional offices in Belgrade, Bratislava, Bucharest, Copenhagen, Helsinki, Lisbon, Madrid, Prague, Sofia, Warsaw and Zagreb.

HBO Max, later renamed Max in line with worldwide brand, launched in the Nordic countries and Spain launched on October 26, 2021. It was further launched in Central and Southeastern block of countries on March 8, 2022, HBO GO, which was previously offered as a standalone portable service, was likewise replaced by Max (Later renamed back to HBO Max in 2025).

== History ==
The first channel was launched in Hungary on September 28, 1991. This was followed in 1994 by the launch in Czech Republic, founding HBO Europe's predecessor under the name HBO Central Europe. In 1995, Walt Disney entered in joint-venture, and in 1996 it was launched in Poland (October 17, 1996), Slovakia (1997), Romania (1998), Moldova (1999), Bulgaria (2002), Croatia, Slovenia (2004), Serbia, Bosnia and Herzegovina, Montenegro (2006), and North Macedonia (2009).

On September 15, 2003, a new premium channel HBO 2 was launched as the sister channel of HBO. In November 2005, Cinemax and Cinemax 2 started to broadcast, while in 2007 a third channel named HBO Comedy was introduced as well.

Initially HBO Europe was co-owned by HBO, Sony Pictures Entertainment and The Walt Disney Company, but from January 29, 2010 Home Box Office acquired complete ownership in its Central European feeds. Upon the launch of HBO in the Netherlands, HBO Central Europe was renamed HBO Europe in 2012. In 2011 HBO entered the market of streaming services with launching HBO Go's localized Central European version. Following HBO Go's launch, in 2012 HBO Nordic was launched in Sweden, Norway, Denmark and Finland, the first countries where HBO introduced only streaming services without any linear television channels. It was followed by the launch of HBO España in 2016 (the Dutch version was closed in the same year) and HBO Portugal in 2019, both of them being VOD-only services.

== Operations ==
=== Television channels ===
HBO Europe owns premium film channels in its Central European operating area. HBO serves as the flagship channel of the portfolio, while HBO2's programming consists of mainly family-friendly content. Former comedy channel HBO Comedy was rebranded in 2016 as HBO3, a premium channel focusing on television series. Cinemax serves as a mainstream cinema channel, while Cinemax 2 offers art films.

- HBO
- HBO 2
- HBO 3 (known as HBO Comedy from 2007–2016)
- Cinemax
- Cinemax 2

=== Streaming services ===
HBO Europe owns streaming services throughout Europe. It has been operating services branded as HBO Go in Central European countries since 2011. Localized subtitles are available in Hungarian, Czech, Romanian, Bulgarian, Croatian, Polish, Serbian, Slovak, Slovenian and Macedonian. Localized dubbing and voiceover feeds are available in Hungarian, Czech and Polish usually a week after an original series' episode premieres. HBO Go is the leading streaming service in all of the countries in which it operates - as of August, 2019, it has 5.5 million subscribers throughout Central Europe. Its platform is developed in Budapest.

HBO was launched as a VOD-only brand in Sweden, Denmark, Norway and Finland as HBO Nordic and in Spain as HBO España. Meanwhile, HBO Go is developed in Budapest, Nordic and España services are headquartered in Stockholm.

On August 15, 2012, HBO announced plans to launch HBO Nordic, a multiplatform video distribution service serving Norway, Denmark, Sweden and Finland that was created through a joint venture with Parsifal International. The video on demand service launched in December 2012. HBO programming also airs in Iceland on Stöð 2. In Spain, HBO programs were previously broadcast on pay television service Canal+, since 2011. In 2016, during the discontinuation of the Canal+ branding in Spain, HBO launched a standalone streaming service called HBO España, which is the Spanish equivalent of HBO Now and HBO Nordic. HBO Europe had announced on multiple occasions that they were not aware that they were going to replace their current service with HBO Max, nor would their rates be increased. However, in December 2020, the head of HBO Max, Andy Forssell, revealed that all HBO services in Europe, including HBO España and HBO Nordic, would be replaced by HBO Max. On October 26, 2021, HBO Max was launched in the Nordics (excluding Iceland) and Spain.

In 2019, HBO's streaming service was also introduced in Portugal as HBO Portugal. Despite the fact that it is not branded as HBO Go, it uses the Central European platform.

In the 2010s, HBO Europe launched the streaming service HBO Go in 13 countries in Central and Eastern Europe. HBO programs in Portugal were previously broadcast on premium television channel TVSéries from the services of TVCine, since 2015. In 2019, less than a year before the discontinuation of TVSéries, HBO Europe launched a standalone streaming service called HBO Portugal. Similar to the Nordics and Spain, HBO Max was launched in Portugal and Central and Eastern Europe on March 8, 2022, replacing HBO Go and HBO Portugal.

== Original programming ==
=== Croatia ===
Title	Genre	Premiere	Seasons	Runtime	Status	Network
Uspjeh	Crime drama	January 6, 2019	1 season, 6 episodes	47–56 min.	Ended	HBO Europe

=== Czech Republic ===
Title	Genre	Premiere	Seasons	Runtime	Status	Network
Na stojáka	Stand-up comedy	2006	112 episodes	30 min.	Ended	HBO Europe
Terapie	Drama	October 9, 2011	3 seasons, 116 episodes	21–29 min.	Ended	HBO Europe
Burning Bush	Drama/Biopic	January 27, 2013	3 episodes	72–84 min.	Miniseries	HBO Europe
Až po uši	Romance/Drama/Comedy	November 2, 2014	2 seasons, 23 episodes	35 min.	Ended	HBO Europe
Mamon	Crime thriller	October 25, 2015	6 episodes	50–58 min.	Miniseries	HBO Europe
Wasteland	Drama/Mystery	October 30, 2016	8 episodes	60 min.	Miniseries	HBO Europe
The Sleepers	Drama	November 17, 2019	6 episodes	60 min.	Miniseries	HBO Europe
Czech It Out!	Docuseries	April 1, 2022	8 episodes	30 min.	Miniseries	HBO Max

=== Denmark ===
Title	Genre	Premiere	Seasons	Runtime	Status	Network
Kamikaze	Young adult thriller drama	November 14, 2021	1 season, 8 episodes	22–36 min.	Ended	HBO Max

=== Finland ===
Title	Genre	Premiere	Seasons	Runtime	Status	Network
Eristyksissä	Anthology	July 19, 2020	7 episodes	12–18 min.	Miniseries	HBO Nordic

=== Hungary ===
Title	Genre	Premiere	Seasons	Runtime	Status	Network
Born Loser	Drama	November 2, 2007	2 seasons, 20 episodes	12 min.	Ended	HBO Europe
In Treatment Hungary	Drama	October 22, 2012	3 seasons, 110 episodes	25 min.	Ended	HBO Europe
When Shall We Kiss?	Comedy drama	October 23, 2013	2 seasons, 26 episodes	30 min.	Ended	HBO Europe
Golden Life	Crime drama	November 8, 2015	3 seasons, 24 episodes	48–57 min.	Ended	HBO Europe
The Informant	Crime drama	April 1, 2022	1 season, 8 episodes	41–46 min.	Moved	HBO Max
The Bridge Hungary	Reality competition	August 11, 2023	1 season, 7 episodes	49–54 min	Ended	HBO Max
Pogány Induló − What Would Mom Say	Docuseries	November 28, 2025	4 episodes	TBA	Miniseries	HBO Max

=== Norway ===
Title	Genre	Premiere	Seasons	Runtime	Status	Network
Beforeigners	Crime drama/Science fiction	August 21, 2019	2 seasons, 12 episodes	45–57 min.	Ended	HBO Nordic (Season 1); HBO Max (Season 2)
Outlier	Crime drama	November 18, 2020	1 season, 8 episodes	42–45 mins.	Ended	HBO Nordic
Utmark	Comedy drama	April 18, 2021	1 season, 8 episodes	45 mins.	Ended	HBO Nordic

=== Poland ===
Title	Genre	Premiere	Seasons	Runtime	Status	Network
Bez tajemnic	Psychological thriller	October 17, 2011	3 seasons, 115 episodes	17–29 min.	Ended	HBO Europe
Wataha	Crime thriller	October 12, 2014	3 seasons, 18 episodes	55 min.	Ended	HBO Europe
The Pact	Detective/Crime thriller	November 8, 2015	2 seasons, 12 episodes	60 min.	Ended	HBO Europe
Blinded by the Lights	Crime thriller	October 27, 2018	8 episodes	55–60 min.	Miniseries	HBO Europe
W domu	Anthology	July 16, 2020	14 episodes	7–13 min.	Miniseries	HBO Europe
A Decent Man	Drama	March 21, 2025	1 season, 6 episodes	40–45 min	Ended	HBO Max
Heaven	Drama	December 26, 2025	1 season, 6 episodes	41–48 min	Pending	HBO Max
Women's Hell	Drama	March 6, 2026	1 season, 6 episodes	44–61 min	Pending	HBO Max
Proud	Drama	June 12, 2026	1 season, 8 episodes	TBA	Pending	HBO Max

=== Romania ===
Title	Genre	Premiere	Seasons	Runtime	Status	Network
Rămâi cu mine	Drama	December 1, 2013	13 episodes	30 min.	Miniseries	HBO Europe
Umbre	Crime drama	December 28, 2014	3 seasons, 21 episodes	41–59 min.	Ended	HBO Europe
The Silent Valley	Crime drama/Action	October 23, 2016	4 episodes	59–63 min.	Miniseries	HBO Europe
Hackerville	Crime drama	October 21, 2018	6 episodes	53–61 min.	Miniseries	HBO Europe; TNT Serie
Tuff Money	Comedy drama	November 22, 2020	1 season, 6 episodes	43–51 min.	Ended	HBO Europe
Ruxx	Comedy drama	March 8, 2022	1 season, 8 episodes	45 min.	Ended	HBO Max
One True Singer	Reality competition	April 1, 2022	1 season, 5 episodes	58–90 min.	Ended	HBO Max
Spy/Master	Drama/Crime thriller	May 19, 2023	6 episodes	50 min.	Miniseries	HBO Max

=== Spain ===
Title	Genre	Premiere	Seasons	Runtime	Status	Network
The Pioneer	Docuseries	July 7, 2019	4 episodes	50 min.	Miniseries	HBO Europe
Foodie Love	Romantic comedy	December 4, 2019	1 season, 8 episodes	30–45 min.	Ended	HBO Europe
En casa	Anthology	June 3, 2020	5 episodes	18–44 min.	Miniseries	HBO Europe
One Way or Another	Comedy	July 22, 2020	1 season, 10 episodes	30 min.	Ended	HBO Europe
Stage 0	Anthology	September 13, 2020	6 episodes	70 min.	Miniseries	HBO Europe
Patria	Historical drama	September 27, 2020	8 episodes	50 min.	Miniseries	HBO Europe
30 Coins	Mystery horror	November 29, 2020	2 seasons, 16 episodes	50 min.	Ended	HBO Europe

=== Sweden ===
Title	Genre	Premiere	Seasons	Runtime	Status	Network
Gösta	Comedy	July 1, 2019	1 season, 12 episodes	30 min.	Ended	HBO Nordic
Beartown	Drama	October 18, 2020	1 season, 5 episodes	60 min.	Ended	HBO Nordic
Pray, Obey, Kill	Docuseries	April 4, 2021	6 episodes	60 min.	Miniseries	HBO Nordic
Lust	Sex comedy	March 18, 2022	1 season, 8 episodes	25–29 min.	Ended	HBO Max

=== Original documentaries ===
==== Hungary ====
- A Pierre Woodman-sztori (2009)
- Miss Plastic – A szikék szépe (2009)
- Láthatatlan húrok – A tehetséges Pusker nővérek (2010)
- Romazsaruk (2010)
- Varázslatos gladiátorok (2011)
- Egyéletes kaland (2011)
- Két világ közt (2011)
- Fehér kard (2012)
- Overdose: Vágta egy álomért (2013)
- Szerelempatak (2014)
- Reményvasút (2015)
- Seb (2015)
- Ütős csajok (2016)
- Ultra (2017)
- Csillagfény távolság (2019)
- Visszatérés Epipóba (2020)
- Anyáim története (2020)
- Dívák (2021)
- Cabin Pressure - Anya leszek csak azért is! (2025)
