= Áron Mátyássy =

Áron Mátyássy (born 1978 in Budapest) is a Hungarian film and television director and screenwriter.

== Biography ==
=== Early life and career ===
Mátyássy's father is a sculptor and his mother is a textile artist. He graduated from Városmajori High School in 1997. Between 1997 and 2000, he studied philosophy and film theory at Eötvös Loránd University (ELTE). From 2000 to 2005, he studied film and television directing at the University of Theatre and Film Arts in Budapest.

Early in his career, he directed documentaries and short films. Since 2009, he has directed the television series Curse (Átok), which has run for three seasons. He obtained his Doctor of Liberal Arts (DLA) from the university in 2015 under the supervision of Ferenc Grunwalsky.

=== Personal life ===
Mátyássy is married to the actress Teréz Vass and they have two sons. His siblings are actor Bence Mátyássy and photographer Jónás Mátyássy.

== Selected film and television directing ==
=== Feature films ===
- Weekend (Víkend, 2015)

=== TV films ===
- God's Knife (Istenke bicskája, 2020)

=== Series ===
- Golden Life (Aranyélet, 2015–2016)
- Age-Restricted Love (Korhatáros szerelem, 2017)
- Model Fathers (Mintaapák, 2019)
- The Butcher (A hentes, 2020)
- The Informant (A besúgó, 2022)
- You Will Find Your Way Home (Hazatalálsz, 2023)

== Theater productions ==
- In these timeless hours (Ezekben az időtlen órákban, 2010)
- Heather Raffo: Without a veil (Fátyol nélkül, 2014)

== Awards ==
- Béla Balázs Award (2016)
