= HBO Max =

American video streaming service

- Logo used since July 9, 2025

- Screenshot Website on June 4, 2023, using the old name
- Former name: Max (2023–2025) (Note: Except in Benelux, where the HBO Max name was retained due to copyright and trademark issues)
- Website type: OTT platform
- Available in: 48 languages
- List of languages: Arabic; Albanian (hidden); Basque; Bengali (hidden); Bulgarian; Burmese (hidden); Catalan; Chinese (Cantonese and Mandarin); Croatian; Czech; Danish; Dutch (Belgium); Dutch (Netherlands); English (United Kingdom); English (United States); Estonian; Filipino; Finnish; French; German; Greek; Hebrew; Hindi (hidden); Hungarian; Icelandic; Indonesian; Italian; Kannada (hidden); Korean (hidden); Latvian; Lithuanian; Macedonian; Malay; Malayalam (hidden); Mongolian; Norwegian (Bokmål); Polish; Portuguese (Brazil); Portuguese (Portugal); Romanian; Russian; Serbian; Slovak; Slovene; Spanish (Latin America); Spanish (Spain); Swedish; Tamil (hidden); Telugu (hidden); Thai; Turkish; Ukrainian; Vietnamese
- Predecessors: List: HBO Go; HBO Now; Cinemax Go; Fullscreen; DC Universe; FilmStruck; DramaFever; HBO Nordic; HBO España; HBO Portugal; BluTV; B/R Live; CNN+; Eurosport Player; GolfTV; GCN+; MotorTrend+; Discovery+ (most countries); Boomerang (as a streaming service)
- Headquarters: New York City, United States
- Country of origin: United States
- Area served: Central Asia, Europe, Latin America and the Caribbean, Middle East and North Africa, United States, and parts of Asia-Pacific (see full list of countries)
- Owner: Skydance Direct-to-Consumer (Skydance)
- Creators: WarnerMedia Direct, LLC
- Key people: David Ellison (Chairman and CEO, Skydance Corporation); Ynon Kreiz (co-CEO of Skydance Corporation); Casey Bloys (Co-Chair and Chief Creative Officer, Skydance Direct-to-Consumer); JB Perrette (Co-Chair and Chief Business Officer, Skydance TV and Skydance Direct-to-Consumer)
- Parent: Home Box Office, Inc.
- Website: hbomax.com
- IPv6 support: Yes
- Registration: Monthly/yearly subscription required to access content
- Users: ▲140 million (as of 6 May 2026)
- Launched: May 27, 2020; 6 years ago
- Current status: Active

HBO Max (known as just Max in select territories and in the United States from 2023 to 2025) is an American subscription video on-demand over-the-top streaming service owned by the Direct-to-Consumer division of Skydance and managed via its Home Box Office, Inc. division. The platform offers content from the libraries of Warner Bros., Discovery Channel, HBO, CNN, Cartoon Network, Adult Swim, Boomerang, Animal Planet, TBS, TNT, TruTV, Eurosport, and their related brands. HBO Max first launched in the United States on May 27, 2020. HBO Max is the fifth most-subscribed video on demand streaming media service, after Disney+, JioHotstar, Amazon Prime Video, and Netflix, with more than 140 million paid memberships worldwide. It is a sister service to Paramount+, which it is set to merge with to create a streaming platform with upwards of 200 million global subscribers.

The service also carries first-run original programming under the "Max Originals" banner, programming from the HBO pay television service, and content acquired via either third-party library deals (such as those with film studios for pay television rights) or co-production agreements (including, among others, those with BBC Studios and Sesame Workshop). When the service was first launched as HBO Max, it succeeded both HBO Now, a previous HBO SVOD service; and HBO Go, the TV Everywhere streaming platform for HBO pay television subscribers. In the United States, HBO Now subscribers and HBO pay television subscribers were migrated to HBO Max at no additional charge, subject to availability and device support. HBO Max also supplanted the streaming component of DC Entertainment's DC Universe service, with its original series being migrated to HBO Max as Max Originals. The HBO Max service began to expand into international markets in 2021.

According to AT&T, the then-owner HBO Max's former parent company WarnerMedia– HBO and HBO Max had a combined total of 69.4 million paying subscribers globally on June 30, 2021, including 43.5 million HBO Max subscribers in the U.S., 3.5 million HBO-only American subscribers (primarily commercial customers like hotels), and 20.5 million subscribers to either HBO Max or HBO by itself in other countries. By the end of 2021, HBO and HBO Max had a combined total of 73.8 million paying global subscribers. At the end of Q1 2022, HBO and HBO Max had 76.8 million global subscribers.

Following the April 2022 merger of WarnerMedia with Discovery, Inc. to form Warner Bros. Discovery, HBO Max was one of the combined company's two flagship streaming services, the other being Discovery+ (which primarily focuses on factual and reality programming from the Discovery brands). WBD initially announced plans for HBO Max and Discovery+ to merge in 2023, but the company ultimately chose to retain Discovery+. As part of the decision, WBD migrated some Discovery+ shows to Max while also leaving them on Discovery+. WBD went on to replace HBO Max with a newly rebranded service, shortening the service's name to "Max", which launched in the United States on May 23, 2023, in Latin America and Caribbean on February 27, 2024, and in Europe on May 21, 2024, introducing a redesigned user interface, and adding more Discovery content. The rebrand was also applied to Netherlands, Poland, France, and several other regions in 2024. In Belgium and the Netherlands, the name "HBO Max" was retained with a new Max logo. On May 14, 2025, it was announced that the "HBO Max" branding would return in the US, reverting to its original name on July 9, 2025. Besides Paramount+ and Discovery+, HBO Max is also a sister streaming service to Pluto TV, which (along with Paramount+) was owned by Skydance before its 2026 acquisition of WBD.

As of May 2025, Discovery+ and HBO Max have reached a combined total of 122.3 million subscribers.

== History ==
=== Original HBO Max branding ===
First logo used from October 29, 2019, to May 22, 2023, in the United States. Used outside of the United States until June 11, 2024.

On October 10, 2018, WarnerMedia announced that it would launch an over-the-top streaming service in late 2019, featuring content from its entertainment brands. The original plan for the service called for three tiers with a late 2019 launch. Randall L. Stephenson, chairman and CEO of WarnerMedia's parent, AT&T indicated in mid-May 2019 that it would use the HBO brand and would tie into cable operators as HBO cable subscribers would have access to the streaming service. A beta was expected in the fourth quarter of 2019 and a full launch in the first quarter of 2020 at the time.

Otter Media was transferred in May 2019 to WarnerMedia Entertainment from Warner Bros. to take over the streaming service as Brad Bentley, executive vice president and general manager of direct-to-consumer development, exited the post after six months. Andy Forssell transferred from being the chief operating officer of Otter to replace Bentley as executive vice president and general manager while still reporting to Otter CEO Tony Goncalves, who would lead development.

On July 9, 2019, WarnerMedia announced that the service would be known as "HBO Max" and that it would launch in spring 2020, while Reese Witherspoon's Hello Sunshine and Greg Berlanti were signed to production deals for the service. (The "Max" moniker is shared with HBO's sister linear pay television service Cinemax, which has alternately identified by its suffix name since the mid-1980s and used it prominently in its branding from 2008 to 2011.) On October 29, 2019, it was announced that HBO Max would officially launch in May 2020.

On January 8, 2020, AT&T announced that Audience, a channel exclusive to subscribers of AT&T-owned television providers such as DirecTV with some original programming, would be sunset on May 22, eventually transitioning to a barker channel for HBO Max. Warner Bros. and HBO Max announced the Warner Max film label on February 5, 2020, which would produce eight to ten mid-budget movies per year for the streaming service starting in 2020. On April 20, 2020, WarnerMedia announced HBO Max's launch date as May 27. Later that year on October 23, it was announced that WarnerMedia decided to consolidate the Warner Max label into the Warner Bros. Pictures Group after its chairman, Toby Emmerich, and his development and production team led by Courtenay Valenti of Warner Bros. Pictures, Richard Brener of New Line and Walter Hamada (who oversees DC-based films), was put to manage the company's entire film output, both theatrical and streaming releases.

=== Warner Bros. Discovery era ===
In July 2022, as a part of a cost-cutting and strategic move following the merger of Discovery, Inc. with WarnerMedia to form Warner Bros. Discovery (WBD), it was reported that HBO Max had ceased new original series development in Central Europe, Nordic countries, the Netherlands, and Turkey, as well as removed selected international series from the platform worldwide. It was reported that France and Spain had been largely excluded from these cuts, due to French regulations requiring streaming services to produce domestic content, and Spanish-language content appealing to a wide range of markets served by HBO Max. With the cancellation of Gordita Chronicles later that month, it was reported that the service was also abandoning development of live-action children's and family programming.

On August 3, 2022, it was reported that multiple Max Original films and HBO series had been quietly removed from the service without prior notice as part of cuts to direct-to-streaming films. The company then wrote off films and series that had underperformed on the service. It was also thought that avoiding payment for residuals played a part. This followed news that had broken the previous day that then-upcoming Max Original films Batgirl and Scoob! Holiday Haunt had been both abruptly cancelled, despite being nearly complete. During an earnings call the next day, WBD CEO David Zaslav stated that the company would cut children's programming and emphasize theatrical films over direct-to-streaming releases.

Later that month, more programs were pulled from the streaming service, including animated and unscripted series such as The Not-Too-Late Show with Elmo, Final Space, Summer Camp Island, Infinity Train, Close Enough, most content from Cartoon Network and Adult Swim, the entirety of the original Looney Tunes and Merrie Melodies cartoons, and nearly 200 episodes of Sesame Street, which was met with heavy backlash from fans, critics, actors, and creators alike. On August 24, 2022, the HBO Max original films House Party (which was pulled from its slate just 17 days before its release) and Evil Dead Rise were both shifted to theatrical releases. WBD later reached licensing deals with the free ad-supported streaming television (FAST) services The Roku Channel and Tubi (owned by Fox Corporation) in 2023; the deal covers over 2,000 hours of library programming, some of which being shows that had been pulled from HBO Max.

During its third-quarter earnings report in November 2022, WBD stated that the merged service was now targeting a "Spring 2023" launch in the U.S., ahead of the original schedule. Perrette also stated of a potential price increase for HBO Max's ad-free tier in 2023, explaining that it was "an opportunity, particularly in this environment". A price hike for the ad-free tier in the U.S. was later announced on January 12, 2023, which saw the price raised by $1 to $15.99 a month (the yearly plan would be unaffected by this move), effective immediately for new subscribers, while current subscribers would see the price hike starting on February 11, 2023.

=== Rebrand as Max ===
First Max logo used from April 12, 2023, to March 30, 2025.

On March 14, 2022, after Discovery shareholders approved its merger with WarnerMedia, Discovery CFO Gunnar Wiedenfels stated that the company planned to pursue an eventual merger of HBO Max with its own streaming service Discovery+. Wiedenfels stated that this process would most likely begin with a bundle of the two services as a short-term option, with a long-term goal to eventually merge the services into one platform.

During an earnings call in August 2022, WBD head of Global Streaming and Interactive JB Perrette revealed that Discovery+ and HBO Max would merge "next Summer", with the unified service launching first in the United States, and rolled out to other markets beginning in late-2023. When announcing the merged service, Zaslav did not immediately indicate whether it would continue to carry the HBO brand. He stated that HBO was one of the "great crown jewels of the company" and would "always be the beacon and the ultimate brand that stands for the best of television quality". In early-December 2022, it was reported by CNBC via inside sources that multiple names were being considered—including simply "Max".

In February 2023, Zaslav revealed during an earnings call that WBD would officially announce the service on April 12. He also announced that WBD would continue operating Discovery+ in conjunction with the service rather than shut it down, stating that it was profitable, and that its subscribers were "very happy with the product offering". One day before the scheduled announcement, The New York Times confirmed that the service would be called "Max", and that it would retain HBO Max's existing pricing and be available in multiple price tiers for six months (on December 5 its legacy ad-free tier will be removed with former users in this tier downgrading to the ads-supported tier after this date). WBD acquired the max.com domain name earlier that year from Max International, a nutritional supplement company, for $1.8 million.

WBD officially unveiled Max on April 12: the new service would first launch in the United States on May 23, and in other regions throughout 2023 and 2024. While the new service maintains similar price points to HBO Max, support for 4K resolution video and Dolby Atmos became exclusive to the new "Ultimate" tier, and the ad-free plan was also reduced from four concurrent streams to two. In addition to all Warner Bros. Pictures releases from 2023 onward, WBD plans to have more library films and television series available on Max in 4K.

Perrette explained that the HBO branding had been dropped from the service's name so that it could be associated with its original programming as a flagship brand on Max, rather than having to be associated with the entirety of its library—which included children's and family programming at odds with HBO having traditionally been associated with premium and adult-oriented programming. The Max logo was designed by the British agency DixonBaxi, and incorporates elements of both the HBO and Warner Bros. logos, including a center-dotted "a" resembling the center-dotted "O" from the HBO logo, and the "m" and "x" letters containing curves based on Warner Bros.' long-time shield logo. The service also changed its corporate color from purple to blue, in homage to Warner Bros.' historical use of blue-colored logos, and to reflect a value of being "premium but accessible".

The rebrand was promoted with the tagline "The one to watch". Pato Spagnoletto, chief marketing officer of Warner Bros. Discovery Streaming, identified the campaign as the largest marketing spend in company history. WBD's stock fell by nearly six percent after Max's announcement. Within the first 3 months of Max's rebrand, WBD lost 1.8 million subscribers across their streaming platforms, but attributed it to an overlap of subscribers of Max and Discovery+, as well as expected churn. In November 2023, it was reported that WBD lost 2.5 million subscribers over a six-month period, with their shares falling 19% as a result.

In May 2024, WBD announced a partnership with Disney Streaming to offer a bundle of Max with Disney+ and Hulu in the United States. It was launched on July 25, 2024, at a price of $16.99 per-month for ad-supported, and $29.99 per-month for ad-free.

=== Return to HBO Max branding ===
Final Max logo used from March 30, 2025, to July 9, 2025.

In February 2025, Max soft-launched a rebranding as part of its launch in Australia, changing its corporate colors from blue to monochrome; media outlets noted that this design (which uses silver or black-colored logos) closer-resembled the branding of HBO itself. The rebrand was launched globally on March 30, 2025.

On May 14, 2025, during its upfronts, WBD announced plans to globally rename the service back to "HBO Max" later in the year. Zaslav explained that "the powerful growth we have seen in our global streaming service is built around the quality of our programming". CEO of HBO and Max Content Casey Bloys added that the HBO brand "clearly states our implicit promise to deliver content that is recognized as unique and, to steal a line we always said at HBO, worth paying for." On June 10, 2025, it was announced that HBO Max would expand its global rollout to 12 countries in Eastern Europe and Central Asia, where it would launch in July 2025. On July 8, 2025, it was reported that the rebranding back to "HBO Max" would begin to roll out on July 9, with Variety reporting that WBD executives wanted it to take effect before the announcement of the nominations for the 77th Primetime Emmy Awards.

=== Acquisition of Warner Bros. Discovery by Paramount Skydance ===
On December 5, 2025, Netflix announced that it would acquire Warner Bros. Discovery for $72 billion. The deal would include HBO Max alongside the main HBO network, the Warner Bros. film, game and television studios, DC Entertainment/DC Studios, while excluding Discovery+, CNN, as well as the company's linear television networks, which would be spun off into the Discovery Global company. Paramount Skydance (which hold several networks previously owned by Warner such as MTV, Nickelodeon, The Movie Channel, VH1 and Comedy Central; Paramount and Warner both own their respective stakes at The CW and Philo) would later launch a hostile takeover bid for the entirety of WBD three days later for an enterprise value of $108.4 billion.

After receiving a contractual waiver from Netflix in February 2026, WBD reopened negotiations with Paramount Skydance. On February 26, 2026, WBD's board determined that Paramount Skydance's revised $110.9 billion offer constituted a superior proposal to the existing Netflix agreement. Netflix declined to match the offer and withdrew, allowing Paramount Skydance to proceed as the winning bidder.

On April 23, 2026, WBD's shareholders approved the sale to Paramount Skydance. The pre-trial press conference would be on February 24, 2027, as the Paramount and Warner Bros. trial was scheduled to take place from March 2 to 19, 2027.

On June 12, 2026, the sale was approved by the U.S. Department of Justice. In July 2026, California and 11 other U.S. states, as well as the Writers Guild of America, filed antitrust lawsuits to delay the consummation of the purchase, arguing that the combined company's share of box office and cable television revenue post-acquisition would give it undue leverage over film exhibitors and television providers. On September 21, 2026, Paramount announced a proposed out-of-court settlement, subject to a five-year consent decree mandating specific investments towards film production and acquisition, restrictions on its engagement with film exhibitors and television providers, and the establishment of an independent board to oversee the editorial integrity and independence of CBS News and CNN post-acquisition, among other conditions. The court delayed its approval in order to allow amicus briefs by parties opposed to the settlement, who argued that its antitrust remedies were not strong enough to address the original concerns raised in the suit; the settlement was approved on September 30, 2026, with Paramount stating that it expected to complete the acquisition by October 6, 2026. The merger closed as planned on that date.

The combined company originally planned to merge its streaming service Paramount+ with HBO Max into one combined service. However, HBO and HBO Max Content CEO Casey Bloys, who took over the combined company's streaming division, stated on October 1, 2026 that the two services were more likely to be offered as a bundled subscription, and would remain operational as standalone streaming services while the Warner Bros. Discovery properties are integrated into the combined entity. On November 9, Skydance CEO David Ellison has confirmed that a Paramount+ and HBO Max bundle will be released in the beginning of 2027.

== Pricing and features tiers ==
Plan	Price (USD)		Features						Ref.
Plan	Monthly	Yearly	Concurrent streams	Offline downloads	HD	4K	HDR	Dolby Atmos	Ref.
Basic with Ads	$10.99	$109.99	2	0	Yes	No	No	No	
Standard	$18.49	$184.99	2	30	Yes	No	No	No	
Premium	$22.99	$229.99	4 (Note: When streaming sports, the number of concurrent streams remains at 2 regardless of plan (and only on standard and premium plans).)	100 (Note: Movies are limited to 30 downloads at once across all mobile devices.)	Yes	Yes	Yes	Yes	

Existing HBO Max subscribers were grandfathered under their current plan features for six months; following that period, all legacy ad free customers were moved to the ad free tier (currently called standard tier). Existing ad supported were moved to the ad lite tier, now called basic with ads tier.

== Management ==
HBO Max was formed under WarnerMedia's Entertainment division, then headed by Robert Greenblatt. Kevin Reilly, president of WarnerMedia Entertainment Networks, which includes most of the company's ad-supported entertainment channels such as TBS, TNT, and TruTV, was also given the role of as chief content officer of HBO Max with responsibility for HBO Max-exclusive original programming and library content. Andy Forssell was named the service's executive vice president and general manager while still reporting to Otter Media CEO Tony Goncalves, who leads development. Casey Bloys, programming president of HBO, retained oversight of the core HBO service but was not initially involved with Max-exclusive programming.

On August 7, 2020, WarnerMedia announced a significant restructuring under new president Jason Kilar, which he described as "leaning into this great moment of change" towards direct-to-consumer services. As a result, Greenblatt and Reilly both left the company. WarnerMedia Entertainment was dissolved, with programming operations combined with Warner Bros. in a new Studios and Networks group under that studio's CEO Ann Sarnoff. Bloys was given complete programming oversight of HBO and HBO Max, as well as Reilly's other previous responsibilities, reporting to Sarnoff. Forssell became the head of a new HBO Max operating business unit, reporting directly to Kilar. On April 23, 2021, Adult Swim and HBO Max's adult animation development teams merged under the leadership of Suzanna Makkos.

On August 15, 2022, HBO was reorganized by Warner Bros. Discovery, resulting in layoffs within HBO Max's non-scripted originals, live-action family originals, international originals, and casting units (HBO itself never had an in-house casting department). Makkos also began reporting to HBO's head of comedy Amy Gravitt.

== Programming ==
HBO Max features first-run and library content from HBO and other Warner Bros. film and television studios and brands. The service also includes films available through HBO's existing pay television rights that are sourced from Warner Bros. Pictures only.

As with HBO's other streaming platforms, HBO Go and HBO Now (but as opposed to its add-on services on Prime Video Channels, YouTube Primetime Channels and, until its removal from that platform in 2021, Apple TV Channels), HBO Max originally did not include feeds of HBO's linear cable channels, nor does it include any content from Cinemax. Though Cinemax shares its film content with the linear HBO channel, and therefore the majority of films in the combined library would be on both services in different windows, these films would not necessarily be available on both Max and Cinemax at the same time.

On December 4, 2024, Max added a "Channels" tab offering live feeds of HBO and its linear multiplex channels (with the exception of HBO Family and HBO Latino). Initially available on a limited basis to U.S. subscribers of Max's Ad-Free and Ultimate Ad-Free tiers using adult profiles, the feature allows users to restart, rewind and fast-forward, and navigate between streams of the linear channel feeds directly from within the player.

=== Content providers ===
First and third-party content providers for HBO Max. Asterisk (*) denotes third parties while cross (†) denotes former providers.

- 9 Story Media Group*
- A24*
- ABS-CBN Studios*
  - Star Cinema
  - Star Creatives
  - Dreamscape Entertainment
- Adult Swim
- AMC Global Media*
- Amazon MGM Studios*
  - Metro-Goldwyn-Mayer
  - United Artists
  - Orion Pictures
  - American International Pictures
- Animal Planet
- Annapurna Pictures*
- Asian Food Network
- Astro Shaw*
- Ay Yapım*
- Bad Robot Productions*
- Banijay Entertainment
  - All3Media
- BBC Studios*
- Big Idea Entertainment*
- Boomerang
- Cartoon Network
- Cartoonito
  - Sesame Workshop (Note: Only in a few countries, while second-run rights are held by PBS Kids and YouTube Kids)*
- Castel Film Romania*
- Castle Rock Entertainment
- CBS
- CBS Studios
- Cinemax
- CJ ENM
- Comedy Central
- Constantin Film*
- Cooking Channel
- CNN Films
- The Criterion Collection*
- Crunchyroll, LLC†
- The CW*
- DC Entertainment
- Destination America
- Discovery Channel
- Discovery Family/Kids
- Discovery Life
- Edko Films*
- Elevation Pictures*
- Emtek (Screenplay Films)*
- Eurosport
- Erler Film*
- Falcon Pictures*
- Fifth Season
- FilmRise*
- Five Star Production*
- Food Network
- Gaumont*
- GKIDS*
- GMA Network Inc.*
  - GMA Entertainment Group
  - GMA Pictures
  - GMA Public Affairs
- GMM Grammy*
- Gravitas Ventures*
- Hanna-Barbera
- Hasbro Entertainment*
- HBO
- Hello Sunshine*
- HGTV
- HLN
- ITV Studios*
- ImageMovers*
- Investigation Discovery
- JTBC*
- Kakao Entertainment
- Lionsgate Studios*
  - Lionsgate Canada
  - Lionsgate Films
  - Lionsgate Television
  - Roadside Attractions
- Magnolia Network
- Mattel Studios*
- MD Pictures*
- Media Asia*
- Mediacorp*
- Media Prima*
- MediaPro Pictures*
- Mei Ah Entertainment*
- MNC Media*
- MotorTrend
- MTV
- MQ Studios*
  - TV5/Cignal Entertainment
- NBCUniversal*
  - Illumination
  - Universal Pictures
- NFB Productions*
- New Line Cinema
- Next Entertainment World*
- Nickelodeon
- Nine Entertainment*
- Nordisk Film*
- Oprah Winfrey Network
- Paramount Pictures
- Paramount Television Studios
- Pathé*
- Rapi Films*
- Regal Entertainment*
- Rooster Teeth*
- RS Group*
- Saban Films*
- Sahamongkol Film International*
- Science Channel
- Seven Media Group*
- SF Studios*
- Shochiku*
- Shout! Studios*
- Showbox*
- Sky*
- SLL*
- Solar Entertainment Corporation*
- Sony Pictures (only Central Europe and Latin America)*
  - Columbia Pictures
  - Sony Pictures Classics
  - Sony Pictures Worldwide Acquisitions
    - Affirm Films
    - Destination Films
    - Stage 6 Films
- Soraya Intercine Films*
- Starvision Plus*
- Studio Dragon
- StudioCanal*
- Studio Ghibli (through GKIDS in United States)*
- TBS
- Teletoon*
- TelevisaUnivision*
- Tencent Pictures
- TF1 Group*
- TLC
- TNT
- TNT Sports
- Toei Company*
- Toho*
- Travel Channel
- TruTV
- Turner Classic Movies
- Turner Entertainment Co.
- TV Globo (Latin America and the Caribbean only, except Brazil)†
- VH1
- Viva Entertainment*
  - Viva Films
  - Studio Viva
- Walt Disney Studios (Latin America and the Caribbean only, except Brazil)*
  - 20th Century Studios
  - Lucasfilm
  - Marvel Studios
  - Pixar (formerly in Central Europe)
  - Searchlight Pictures
  - Walt Disney Pictures
- Warner Bros. Animation
- Warner Bros. Entertainment
- Warner Bros. Pictures
- Warner Bros. Japan (only Japan) (Note: Licensed out to Netflix, Amazon Prime Video, Viu, iQIYI, WeTV iflix, Viki, and Crunchyroll outside Japan.)
- Wizarding World

=== Max Originals ===
Original content produced would be under the banner Max Originals, including series, films, and specials. Original episodic content is released weekly, eschewing the "binge" format made popular by Netflix. Kevin Reilly stated this was to ensure that originals would remain in the spotlight for extended periods, by letting said shows "breathe" as opposed to "fading quickly after a binge and burn". He also noted that the weekly schedule helped to drive the success of past HBO shows like Succession and Chernobyl which they co-produced with Sky UK, and became hits precisely due to their staying power.

A slate of 31 original series were planned for its first year, with plans to expand to 50 for its next year, but production timelines may have been interrupted by the COVID-19 pandemic. Max also has podcasts about the films and TV series on the service. It also produces original podcasts exclusively for the service, with Batman: The Audio Adventures being the first.

=== Syndication ===
New Warner Bros.-produced television series that have premiered on The CW since the 2019–20 season beginning with Batwoman and Nancy Drew would have their past seasons placed on HBO Max about a month after the season finale airs on television (streaming rights to existing series remains with Netflix under an existing deal). Katy Keene left HBO Max on July 9, 2025. Although the All American spin-off, All American: Homecoming, which premiered on the CW in 2022, was placed on Netflix with its parent show. On July 9, 2019, HBO Max acquired the U.S. streaming rights to Friends in a $425 million deal, and on September 17, 2019, acquired the U.S. streaming rights to The Big Bang Theory, as part of a deal that also extends TBS's off-network rights to the series through 2028.

=== Acquired rights ===
Outside of Warner Bros. Discovery, the service also offers titles from The Criterion Collection, and has a long-term partnership with BBC Studios (which HBO had previously partnered with to create His Dark Materials). Over 700 episodes of BBC content were available on the service at launch, including the first 11 seasons of the 2005 Doctor Who revival, as well as future seasons twelve through fourteen, and a variety of other shows including The Honourable Woman, Luther, Top Gear, and the original British version of The Office. Additionally, future shows by BBC Studios would be co-produced with HBO Max.

HBO also extended their existing partnership with Sesame Workshop, while moving said content to the front of the HBO Max brand. Select episodes from all fifty seasons of Sesame Street (dating back to 1969) are available to stream on the service for the first time ever. Additionally, future seasons of Sesame Street streamed exclusively on HBO Max until 2025, alongside Esme & Roy, and several new spin-offs starting with The Not-Too-Late Show with Elmo, Sesame Street: Mecha Builders, and The Monster at the End of This Story. On March 8, 2022, WarnerMedia and Sesame Workshop announced they would plan new shows for Cartoon Network for the new original series run and a second run acquisition rights HBO Max, including Charlotte's Web, and Bea's Block as well as the animation special Sesame Street: The Nutcracker. In addition, new episodes to start of the 53rd season of Sesame Street and spin-offs would be available to stream on HBO Max in selecting Asian territories while holding the second run acquisition rights to replace PBS, more than a new first run for Cartoon Network.

HBO Max has acquired the streaming rights to several Comedy Central series, including South Park, Awkwafina Is Nora from Queens, South Side, and The Other Two; with the latter two becoming Max Original series.

In November 2021, HBO Max acquired the rights to Globo's telenovelas and series for Latin America and the Caribbean outside of Brazil.

In February 2022, Sony Pictures and WarnerMedia announced that they would extend their agreement to carry films from its subsidiary companies in its Central and Eastern Europe pay television window rights window along with the library of television series produced by its sister company Sony Pictures Television Studios, the deal would also include the rights to its releases beginning in 2022 for broadcasting on its channels and would be streaming it on HBO Max throughout Central and Eastern Europe.

=== Animation ===
The service also features many hubs for animated programming, drawing largely from the libraries of Warner Bros. Animation (including the Looney Tunes franchise and Hanna-Barbera productions, such as Scooby-Doo, Tom and Jerry and Tex Avery's cartoons as well) and Cartoon Network, along with Adult Swim. Original animated series (including the Adventure Time epilogue specials Adventure Time: Distant Lands, Jellystone!, Looney Tunes Cartoons, continuations of Infinity Train, and Summer Camp Island, and a reboot of The Boondocks produced by Sony Pictures Animation) for both network sections were also announced for HBO Max, and the service beat out competitors to acquire exclusive domestic streaming rights to South Park and its next three seasons for $500 million–with first-run episodes being added 24 hours after their premiere on Comedy Central. Fellow Otter Media company Rooster Teeth also contributed content until its closure in 2024, with season two of Gen:Lock being a timed exclusive for HBO Max.

=== Post-launch ===
All eight films in the Harry Potter series were available to stream on the service on launch day, despite earlier reports indicating that the films, although produced by Warner Bros., would not be available due to a prior broadcast rights agreement with NBCUniversal. It was later announced that the films would be removed on August 25 and made available on NBCUniversal's streaming service Peacock. However, it officially brought them back on September 1, 2021, after an adjustment in the agreement. On May 29, 2020, HBO Max acquired the exclusive streaming rights to The Big Bang Theory spin-off Young Sheldon.

On June 9, 2020, Gone with the Wind was temporarily removed from HBO Max's library amid the George Floyd protests, following an op-ed in the Los Angeles Times by 12 Years a Slave screenwriter John Ridley. On June 25, the film returned in its original form with, as suggested by Ridley, a new introduction by Turner Classic Movies host Jacqueline Stewart discussing the film's treatments of the American Civil War, the Reconstruction era, and American slavery of African people.

On June 27, 2020, it was revealed that DC Universe original Harley Quinn would stream its first two seasons on HBO Max. On June 29, 2020, HBO Max secured the exclusive streaming rights of the Oprah Winfrey Network series David Makes Man. On September 18, 2020, it was announced that all DC Universe content would be migrating to HBO Max, including original shows like Titans and Young Justice, which would have their newest seasons air exclusively on the service. In addition, both Doom Patrol and Harley Quinn have been renewed for third seasons exclusively for the service.

On October 28, 2020, it was announced that the 1990s series Tiny Toon Adventures would be rebooted for Cartoon Network and HBO Max as Tiny Toons Looniversity, featuring older versions of the characters. Steven Spielberg returned as executive producer. The show was given a two-season order.

In February 2021, it was announced that WarnerMedia's international preschool brand Cartoonito would launch in the United States via Cartoon Network and HBO Max later in the year, with a slate of 50 series by 2023.

In June 2021, HBO Max ordered a pilot from John Wells and Animal Kingdom writer Matt Kester for Ke Nui Road, an action drama following a team of lifeguards in the North Shore of O'ahu, Hawaii. HBO Max would not go forward with the series, and it would instead be given a series order by Fox as Rescue: HI-Surf.

In August 2021, Funimation, a subsidiary of Sony, purchased Crunchyroll from AT&T for $1.175 billion, with the intent to create a combined service that caters to anime entertainment. On January 1, 2022, HBO Max removed the Crunchyroll hub, instead redirecting subscribers to a "global animation" page that combines selected anime with other international animated films. Since then, the service has slowly started to remove anime from Crunchyroll's line up.

On November 22, 2021, Disney and WarnerMedia reached a deal to amend the pre-existing contract HBO had with 20th Century Studios to allow Disney+ or Hulu and HBO Max to share the streaming rights to half of 20th Century Studios' and Searchlight Pictures' 2022 theatrical slate in the United States during the pay-one window, with Ron's Gone Wrong being the first film under the deal, becoming available on both Disney+ and HBO Max on December 15, 2021. Disney would still have full streaming rights to any 20th Century Studios and Searchlight Pictures films produced for Disney+ or Hulu, while the Disney deal with WarnerMedia for streaming 20th Century Studios and Searchlight Pictures films on HBO Max ended in 2022, with Disney+ and Hulu assuming the full pay-one rights to those films in the future.

On February 15, 2022, it was announced that first-run episodes of South Park would move to Paramount+ beginning with season 27 in 2024, and the series library would move from HBO Max to the service in the United States in 2025.

On August 4, 2022, it was announced that selected Magnolia Network programs would become available on HBO Max in September 2022. Discovery+ would remain the main streaming home of its programming.

On October 7, 2022, HBO Max announced Harley Quinn: A Very Problematic Valentine's Day Special, which premiered on February 23, 2023.

With the announced rebrand of HBO Max as Max, WBD announced several new projects, including a television series adaptation of Harry Potter planned to premiere in the 2025–26 season and run for ten years, and It: Welcome to Derry—a prequel series to Andy Muschietti's film adaptation of It. It also announced the animated series Gremlins: Secrets of the Mogwai and Tiny Toons Looniversity, with the former premiering alongside the rebrand on May 23, 2023.

On October 2, 2024, WBD renewed its contract with professional wrestling promotion All Elite Wrestling (AEW), adding digital rights in the United States to simulcast its weekly television programs Dynamite and Collision on Max beginning in January 2025, and library content such as past episodes and pay-per-view (PPV) events. Later in 2025, Max subscribers would also be able to purchase and stream AEW PPVs through the platform at a discount. While they would be still sold via other outlets and partners (such as television providers), promotion would be focused exclusively on Max. This aspect of the contract took effect in September 2025, beginning with All Out.

==== "Project Popcorn": Warner Bros. same-day premieres ====
In late 2020, due to the COVID-19 pandemic, WarnerMedia moved two Warner Bros. films originally intended as major theatrical releases to either exclusive or simultaneous releases on HBO Max. The Witches was released exclusively on HBO Max in the U.S. on October 22, and Wonder Woman 1984 debuted simultaneously in North American theaters and on HBO Max on December 25, although the latter was initially only available on the service for a month. Week-long free trials were discontinued in December 2020.

On December 3, 2020, it was announced that the studio's entire 2021 film lineup would see a simultaneous theatrical release and a one-month limited release on the streaming service, starting with The Little Things on January 29. Subsequent films released under the same-day theatrical/streaming window to date were Judas and the Black Messiah (February 12), Tom and Jerry (February 26), Godzilla vs. Kong (March 31), Mortal Kombat (April 23), Those Who Wish Me Dead (May 14), The Conjuring: The Devil Made Me Do It (June 4), In the Heights (June 10), Space Jam: A New Legacy (July 16), The Suicide Squad (August 5), Reminiscence (August 20), Malignant (September 10), Cry Macho (September 17), The Many Saints of Newark (October 1), Dune (October 22), King Richard (November 19), and The Matrix Resurrections (December 22). Standard release windows applied to each film after their initial limited-run streaming release on the service; HBO Max would then reassume streaming rights to the aforementioned Warner Bros. films upon their respective pay television premieres on the linear HBO service in mid-to-late 2021 or 2022, depending on the scheduled start of their individual HBO exhibition agreements.

This decision, called "Project Popcorn" within Warner Bros., was met with backlash from filmmakers, production companies, the Directors Guild of America, the Creative Artists Agency, and movie theater owners as Warner Bros. had not informed anyone about their plan ahead of the announcement. Viewership of the films varied, with Mortal Kombat reaching 3.8 million, The Conjuring: The Devil Made Me Do It totaling 1.6 million, and In the Heights totaling 693,000 (according to Samba TV, as WarnerMedia does not report viewership numbers for HBO Max).

Warner Bros. spent over $200 million alone compensating talent for the shift to streaming; Deadline reported in January 2022 that such a business move "will never occur again given its high cost".

In March 2021, it was announced that Warner Bros. would discontinue same-day releases in 2022, as part of an agreement the studio reached with Cineworld (who operates Regal Cinemas) and would instead use a 45-day exclusive release window for theaters. The Matrix Resurrections was the final film released in 2021 as part of Project Popcorn. The 45-day release window for HBO Max was only used for two films (The Batman and Fantastic Beasts: The Secrets of Dumbledore) before it was reported in August 2022 that, as part of a restructuring of Warner Bros.' film distribution strategy following the merger of WarnerMedia and Discovery, Inc., the length of the window would now be decided for each film on a case-by-case basis.

=== CNN Max ===
CNN Max logo

On August 13, 2023, CNN announced a new streaming news hub on Max known as CNN Max to launch on September 27, which features a mix of original news programs and simulcasts of primetime programs from CNN's U.S. and international linear networks. CNN International is also available through Max in European countries such as France and Poland.

CNN had previously attempted a standalone subscription service in 2022, CNN+, but was closed almost immediately after the completion of the WarnerMedia/Discovery merger due to it conflicting with the company's goal of having one streaming service to encompass all WBD properties.

On March 30, 2025, HBO Max has removed this feature on the basic with ads plan.

On October 3, 2025, HBO Max announced that CNN Max would be discontinued on November 17, 2025, with no reason given, with the development of the all access plan for CNN digital content, called CNN All Access (launched on October 28, 2025).

=== Sports on HBO Max ===
On March 1, 2022, Turner Sports announced an eight-year deal to hold rights to United States men's and women's national soccer team home matches, such as FIFA World Cup qualifying and international friendlies. This excludes FIFA and CONCACAF events, whose rights are held by Fox, and away matches. It was stated that at least half the matches per-season would be exclusive to HBO Max. The first match was streamed on January 17, 2023.

On October 5, 2023, HBO Max announced plans to launch a new sports-focused tier in the United States, to be known initially as the Bleacher Report Sports add-on. The tier would feature live sporting events and studio shows from TNT Sports, including Major League Baseball (MLB), the National Basketball Association (NBA), the National Hockey League (NHL), and the NCAA Division I men's basketball tournament, as well as exclusive USA Soccer matches and programs, and select on-demand content. On December 14, 2023, amid the closure of the GCN+ service, WBD announced that its programming rights would be consolidated into the sports add-on in February 2024, including the Giro d'Italia and various UCI tours and events.

The service was to be available as a free preview until February 29, 2024, after which it was to become an $9.99 add-on on top of an existing Max subscription. However, amid changes to TNT Sports' portfolio (including its impending loss of rights to the NBA in 2025, and other acquisitions such as college sports and international events such as the French Open), the launch of the sports add-on as a paid service was delayed indefinitely. On February 26, 2025, it was announced that the add-on had been scrapped as part of a change in strategy, and that live sports content would be available at no additional charge as part of the "Standard" and "Premium" tiers of Max (as B/R sports on Max). JB Perrette stated that WBD had been "actively involved in exploring ways to evolve the sports distribution ecosystem in the U.S.", and that offering sports content as part of the existing tiers was the best option for subscribers.

=== Eurosport add-on ===
Similar to the Bleacher Report Sports add-on in the United States, a sports-focused tier was added to Max in Europe during its launch over the summer of 2024 in conjunction with its pan-European sports brand Eurosport. This tier would offer the linear channels Eurosport 1 and Eurosport 2, and coverage for various sports events including the 2024 Summer Olympics, Giro d'Italia, Vuelta a España, and Tour de France.

=== TNT Sports Premium add-on ===
On July 9, 2024, Warner Bros. Discovery announced that TNT Sports would arrive at Max in Chile the week of July 15 with an innovative proposal where sports fans would be able to subscribe independently or by adding it to the platform's available plans. It would include live events and original content.

The most relevant Chilean soccer competitions are added, such as the Chilean Primera División, Primera B, Copa Chile and original programming, among others.

From February 2025, TNT Sports content would be available to users with a subscription to Pack Fútbol with their enabled cable operator and to TNT Sports subscribers independently.

=== Max DAZN Package ===
From October 24, 2024, in Spain, Max has added a new Max DAZN package that costs €44.99 per month, in addition to the Sports package that is optional for the Standard and Premium plans, it includes four DAZN channels in addition to Eurosport with the best sport that fans could wish for.

La Liga, the UFC, or the Formula 1 and MotoGP world championships would be available to subscribers of the Max DAZN Package, in addition to having all the movies, series and documentaries on the platform with the same advantages as the Premium Plan.

== Technologies and accessibility ==
At launch, HBO Max did not support 4K, HDR, Dolby Vision, or Dolby Atmos, but support for these technologies were planned as "part of the HBO Max product roadmap". Support for 4K, HDR, and Atmos was added starting with the release of Wonder Woman 1984, with WarnerMedia promising to add more content in these formats throughout 2021 and beyond.

The service provided closed captioning support at launch, but initially lacked support for audio description (AD) for those with visual impairments. In October 2020, the American Council of the Blind announced it had reached a settlement with WarnerMedia whereby at least 1,500 hours of HBO Max content would be available with AD by the end of March 2021, increasing to at least 6,000 hours by March 2023, along with other accessibility enhancements to the website and apps by September 2021. HBO Max later began rolling out AD on select titles on March 26, 2021.

HBO Max also offers selected content with American Sign Language (ASL) interpretation; in 2025, season 2 of The Last of Us became the first television series on a streaming service to offer a signed version of its first-run episodes. In June 2025, tying in with its setting and themes, it was announced that Sinners would become the first film to be offered on a streaming platform in Black American Sign Language (BASL).

== Distribution ==
=== United States ===
The majority of active subscribers to the HBO pay TV service (which previously included HBO Go), and most customers that were subscribed to HBO Now at time of launch, can access HBO Max for no extra charge, with all three services generally sharing the same price point of $14.99 per month. However, this transition is contingent on the customer's current provider or biller having signed a new distribution agreement for HBO Max with WarnerMedia.

On May 27, 2020, as part of an agreement with Time Warner that renewed its carriage contract for the Turner Broadcasting System networks and gave its over-the-top television service Sling TV distribution rights to the linear HBO channel. Dish Network secured an option to become a distribution partner for HBO Max following the exclusivity period with Apple. HBO content is also available as a premium add-on for DirecTV Stream and Hulu for the same $14.99 price as HBO Max.

In announcing HBO Max, WarnerMedia immediately confirmed that HBO subscribers on AT&T-owned platforms (including AT&T TV, DirecTV, U-verse, and AT&T Mobility) would receive HBO Max on-launch at no additional charge. AT&T customers who are subscribed to their highest-tiered internet, TV and wireless plans would also receive HBO Max for free, while those on lower-tiered plans will get a free trial ranging from one month to one year. Existing HBO Now subscribers billed directly by HBO were also migrated to HBO Max on-launch at no additional charge. On April 27, 2020, an agreement was announced for HBO Now subscribers via Apple (both in-app subscriptions and Apple TV Channels) to be migrated to HBO Max. Content from HBO Max would be listed in the Apple TV app along with there being a dedicated HBO Max hub in the app. On Apple TV devices, HBO Max is available to the regular fourth generation Apple TV and fifth and sixth generation Apple TV 4K; earlier versions which do not support third-party app download are not supported.

WarnerMedia subsequently negotiated with other pay TV providers for similar arrangements. On February 20, 2020, WarnerMedia announced a distribution deal with YouTube TV that would allow members to add HBO and Cinemax, while also being able to include HBO Max as an add-on. On April 15, 2020, WarnerMedia announced a similar deal with Charter Spectrum (which acquired Warner's former cable division after it was spun off in 2009, in May 2016) to give access to HBO Max for HBO subscribers via their TV Everywhere credentials. A similar agreement was announced with Hulu on May 1 for most existing subscribers via Hulu + Live TV, as well as being available as an add-on to all other plans on the service. On May 20, 2020, it was announced that WarnerMedia had made distribution deals with Altice USA, Cox Communications, Xbox, Samsung, PlayStation, Verizon Communications and the National Cable Television Cooperative (NCTC). An agreement with Comcast (Xfinity) was announced a few hours after the platform's launch. Max is also available on Xfinity Flex and Cox Contour Stream Player.

The most prominent platforms without agreements to carry HBO Max at the launch were Amazon (maker of the Fire TV and Fire HD devices) and Roku, which together are estimated to control 70% of the U.S. streaming player market. With both platforms, non-Max HBO content remained available as usual through the companies' respective channels platforms or through HBO Now (which was rebranded to just "HBO" on July 31, 2020) while deals for HBO Max were being worked out. On May 13, 2020, John Stankey, CEO of AT&T, revealed to Variety that Amazon was very unlikely to become a launch partner for HBO Max; the parties have remained at an impasse following the launch, reportedly due to a disagreement about whether Amazon can host the additional Max programming directly on its Amazon Prime Video Channels platform as it does for HBO currently. On November 16, 2020, it was announced that WarnerMedia and Amazon had reached an agreement to make HBO Max available on Fire TV and Fire Tablet devices beginning the following day, while also allowing subscribers of HBO via Prime Video Channels access to the HBO Max app at no extra cost (although the additional Max programming will still not be hosted on the Prime Video Channels platform). The dispute with Roku was reported to hinge on carriage commissions and advertising sales on the future ad-supported tier. On December 16, 2020, it was announced that WarnerMedia and Roku had reached an agreement to make HBO Max available on Roku devices beginning the following day, while also allowing subscribers of HBO via Roku Channels access to the HBO Max app at no extra cost (although the additional Max programming would still not be hosted on the Roku Channels platform); conversely, Roku remote controls from the past five years which included an HBO Now app shortcut button now route viewers directly to the HBO Max app instead. Dish Network was also erroneously mentioned as a holdout in some media reports; HBO has not been available at all from Dish since late 2018 due to a separate dispute. On July 29, 2021, WarnerMedia and Dish announced that they had reached an agreement to resolve the dispute and restore HBO to Dish's satellite service, along with offering access to HBO Max to HBO subscribers via Dish at no extra cost.

There were plans for HBO Max to introduce an ad-supported tier by 2021, with AT&T later announcing during their Investor Day event on March 12, 2021, that the tier would launch in June of the same year. HBO original programming will continue to be ad-free for subscribers of the tier, but the tier will not allow access to Same-Day Premieres. WarnerMedia later announced during their 2021 upfront presentation on May 19 that the ad-supported tier would launch during the first week of June at a price point of $9.99 a month. The tier would end up launching on June 3, while also adding a yearly option for both tiers (priced at $99.99 a year for the ad-supported tier and $149.99 a year for the ad-free tier).

=== International expansion ===
Localized versions of HBO Max launched on June 29, 2021, in Latin America and the Caribbean, on October 26, 2021, in Andorra, Spain and the Nordics (excluding Iceland), and on March 8, 2022, in Central and Eastern Europe and Portugal, in part by converting existing streaming services operated by HBO in some of those markets to the HBO Max platform. In the interim, some HBO Max original programs have been made available on WarnerMedia's existing international platforms, also including HBO Asia. The European launches of HBO Max featured a notable promotion, offering the service with a 50% discount "for life" for new subscribers as long as they maintain their subscription.

In other countries, HBO or Max original programs are licensed to third-party networks and streaming services under long-term deals. In these cases, Max has left it up to individual rightsholders to decide whether to offer its programming on an over-the-top basis. The extent and lengths of the deals vary by country; not all networks that carry HBO programs also carry Max programs, and in some cases individual programs are carried by different services.

WarnerMedia said in late 2019 that it planned to continue HBO's existing international licensing partnerships for the time being. However, as part of the WarnerMedia further restructuring announced in August 2020, WarnerMedia president Jason Kilar said HBO Max would be expanding its scope globally. Operations chief Andy Forssell indicated later that year that the company ultimately plans to have HBO Max active in 190 countries, but that a timeline for most of the remaining countries had not been decided.

Following the merger of WarnerMedia with Discovery, Inc. in April 2022, Warner Bros. Discovery has decided to halt international expansion of HBO Max in favor of waiting to replace the existing service, as well as HBO Go in Asia-Pacific region, with Max, and instead continuing to license its content to other international distributors such as Sky Europe and Foxtel in markets where HBO Max isn't available, in an attempt to reach financial stability for the company. This also included postponing the launch of Max in France and Belgium until the summer 2024, despite there already being plans to launch the service as HBO Max in 2023.

Plans for expansion of HBO Max restarted on 2025 in Australia, Turkey, the Post-Soviet states, and other Asia-Pacific countries, and are expected to continue into 2026, for regions where Sky Europe operates, although the service had already continued to expand before then, but in the form of an additional VOD hub for existing pay TV operators in countries like New Zealand, Japan and Greece.

==== Latin America and the Caribbean ====
HBO Max was launched on June 29, 2021, in the 39 territories of Latin America and the Caribbean, where HBO already operated directly its streaming service HBO Go, and premium television channels. HBO Max in Latin America and the Caribbean was rebranded as Max on February 27, 2024, before it reverted again into HBO Max globally on July 9, 2025.

==== Canada ====
HBO Max does not operate in Canada; rights to most Max Original programming produced by Warner Bros. or its subsidiaries are held by Bell Canada's subsidiary Bell Media, (Note: By coincidence, Bell Canada was formerly part-owned by WarnerMedia's 2018–2022 parent company AT&T until 1975; however Bell's relationship with HBO predated AT&T's acquisition of WarnerMedia. Bell Media and its predecessors also had a separate partnership with Discovery, Inc. covering Discovery Channel Canada and related services, dating back to 1995 with the formation of NetStar Communications, prior to the acquisition that rebranded TimeWarner as WarnerMedia (post-2014 as what were originally the non-broadcast assets of Time Inc. had been spun off again from the company since the first iteration of TimeWarner which underwent several changes before and as explained, afterwards) during which Max was announced and launched but preceded the history of Bell-Discovery relationship by 5 years given its original formation in 1990.) which distributes them via its OTT service Crave, and its English- and French-language pay television services Crave and Super Écran (which themselves include access to the OTT version of Crave via TV Everywhere credentials). The agreement was first announced in 2019, also renewing Crave's existing rights to first-run HBO programming (Bell operates an HBO channel as a multiplex of Crave) and pay-one rights to Warner Bros. Pictures releases. It does not include the rights to series produced for the service by third-party studios. The agreement was most recently renewed in 2024 for an unspecified length.

The Bell agreement has excluded some of HBO Max's youth, family, and animation programming, which have often been picked up by Corus Entertainment for its specialty channels, such as Cartoon Network, Treehouse, and Adult Swim (in conjunction with the company's long-standing output agreement with Cartoon Network). Some part of WBD library which in HBO Max, available in various website in Canada, WBD's series and movies programming in Crave, Cartoon Network programming in StackTV and an independent Discovery+ service with all documentary and lifestyle programmings available on here.

==== Europe ====
===== France =====
On November 13, 2008, Orange launched Orange Cinéma Séries (renamed OCS in 2012), a five-channel package, dedicated to movie and series. The same year, OCS signed a long-term agreement with HBO. On October 10, 2013, they launched the channel OCS City (initially nicknamed Génération HBO) to broadcast only HBO productions. The HBO catalog was also available to stream on their streaming service. From 2019 to 2023, OCS had the complete exclusivity on the HBO catalog in France. Before that, other channels like Canal+, Canal+ Séries or NT1 could aired reruns of selected HBO series after their original run on OCS. However, OCS didn't have the rights on the Max catalogue. The deal ended in December 2022, with HBO productions leaving OCS from January 2023 onwards.

In October 2021, former Canal+ executive Vera Peltekian was appointed as VP and commissioning editor of original HBO Max programming for France. HBO Max's launch in France was set for 2023, but this ended up getting delayed after Warner Bros. Discovery decided to halt the global rollout of HBO Max to replace the existing service with Max first. Meanwhile, Canal+, the TF1 Group, and Warner TV broadcast a selection of the Warner Bros.-produced scripted live-action Max Original series, certain films and reunion specials. Programs not owned by Warner Bros. (like Lionsgate's Love Life) have been licensed separately to other French broadcasters.

In October 2022, Amazon Prime Video signed a deal with Warner Bros. Discovery to distribute the HBO Max programs owned by Warner Bros. in France. In January 2023, it was announced that the deal was extended to all HBO productions, following the expiration of the deal with OCS for HBO productions, but also to Warner Bros. Discovery's linear TV channels, following the end of the deal with Canal+ for their carriage. All this content where available on the service through Le Pass Warner ("The Warner Pass"), a subscription-based channel, launched on March 16, 2023. Selected programs (like The Last of Us, Peacemaker, Pretty Little Liars: Original Sin and The Sex Lives of College Girls) where released without a subscription to the channel for a limited time. The Warner Pass was removed from the service following the launch of Max in France with its subscribers automatically transferred to a Max subscription.

The service was launched as Max in France on June 11, 2024. In France, the service also include an access to Warner Bros. Discovery's French linear TV channels (Warner TV, Warner TV Next and others), similar to the service's offer in Poland, and the option to subscribe to a sports-focused add-on that include various live sports events and an access to Eurosport's linear channels. During the 2024 Summer Olympics, the service shared the broadcast with France Télévisions, and covered the event for all subscribers, even those without the sports add-on. The service's ad-free plan is also available as a subscription-based channel on others services like Amazon Prime Video or Canal+.

===== Netherlands and Belgium =====
A former variant logo used in Belgium and the Netherlands

Former variant logo in blue

On February 9, 2012, HBO Netherlands started as a joint venture between HBO and Dutch cable operator Ziggo. HBO Netherlands aired as a three-channel multiplex service in addition to offering a localized version of HBO Go to subscribers. HBO Netherlands was not limited to subscribers of Ziggo, instead, many Dutch cable operators offered HBO Netherlands. However, on September 28, 2016, HBO Netherlands announced that it would cease operations on December 31, 2016. That same day, it was announced that Ziggo had bought exclusive rights to HBO programming. On November 1, 2016, it was announced that Ziggo will offer HBO programming exclusively as part of their new Movies & Series service starting from January 2017. In September 2021, it was reported that Ziggo's rights to HBO programming is set to expire at the end of the year. Ziggo confirmed that its HBO programming rights are set to expire on January 1, 2022, as a result of WarnerMedia launching HBO Max in The Netherlands in 2022. However, some recently aired seasons will remain on the Movies & Series service. On February 1, 2022, the launch date was officially announced for March 8, 2022.

In Belgium, HBO and Max programing was broadcast through the pay TV operators BeTV and Streamz (Telenet).

The Max rebranding in the Netherlands took place on June 11, 2024, alongside a soft launch in Belgium, before its full launch on July 1, but the "HBO Max" name retained due to trademark conflicts with Omroep MAX, a member of the Dutch public broadcasting system, as well as VRT MAX, a streaming platform by the VRT.

===== Nordic countries and Spain =====
On August 15, 2012, HBO announced plans to launch HBO Nordic, a multiplatform video distribution service serving Norway, Denmark, Sweden and Finland that was created through a joint venture with Parsifal International. The video on demand service launched in December 2012. In Spain, HBO programs were previously broadcast on pay television service Canal+, since 2011. In 2016, during the discontinuation of the Canal+ branding in Spain, HBO launched a standalone streaming service called HBO España, which was the Spanish equivalent of HBO Now and HBO Nordic.

HBO Europe had announced on multiple occasions that they were not aware that they were going to replace their current service with HBO Max, nor would their rates be increased. However, in December 2020, the head of HBO Max, Andy Forssell, revealed that all HBO services in Europe, including HBO España and HBO Nordic, would be replaced by HBO Max. On October 26, 2021, HBO Max was launched in the Nordics (excluding Iceland) and Spain and Andorra.

Starting in 2024, HBO Max's programming began to be integrated as part of more expensive packages in the Spanish TV service Movistar Plus+ with all programming from the service becoming available on Movistar Plus+ by April 2024. The rebranding to Max went into effect on May 21, 2024. On September 17, 2024, a linear TV channel dedicated to broadcasting HBO and Max content was launched, exclusively on Movistar Plus+, as Max Avances. Following the reimplementation of the HBO Max name, the channel was renamed HBO Max Avances.

In Iceland, HBO programming aired on Stöð 2 since 2014, and remained as such even after HBO Max launching in the other Nordic countries. In 2022, HBO signed an agreement with Síminn which aired HBO programming on its SVOD service, Sjónvarp Símans Premium. In July 2025, HBO Max was officially launched in Iceland and HBO and Síminn extended their partnership and bundle HBO Max with the Síminn SVOD service.

===== Central and Eastern Europe countries and Portugal =====
In the 2010s, HBO Europe launched streaming service HBO Go in 13 Central and Eastern European countries. HBO programs in Portugal were previously broadcast on the premium television channel TVSéries from the services of TVCine, since 2015. In 2019, less than a year before the discontinuation of TVSeries, HBO Europe launched a standalone streaming service called HBO Portugal. Similarly to the Nordics and Spain, HBO Max was launched in Portugal and Central and Eastern Europe on March 8, 2022, respectively replacing HBO Portugal and HBO Go.

The rebranding to Max went into effect on May 21, 2024, except in Poland where it took place on June 11. All of these were reverted again into HBO Max globally just a years later. The Max rebranding in Poland also gave the option to live stream all of TVN Warner Bros. Discovery's linear television networks as part of the Sports add-on, except Cinemax 1 and Cinemax 2. Meanwhile, Polish users not subscribed to extra add-on will be able to only live stream the three HBO channels in Poland and the free to air network TVN.

===== Turkey, Greece, and post-Soviet states =====
Plans to introduce HBO Max in Turkey, Greece and the Baltic states, where HBO Go was absent, were announced in October 2021, but these plans were later halted following the creation of Warner Bros. Discovery, with Vodafone TV in Greece, various TV operators in Turkey, including Digiturk, and Go3 and Telia in the Baltic states instead getting the rights for various HBO and Max programming.

On December 6, 2023, Warner Bros. Discovery (WBD) fully acquired the Turkish streaming service BluTV, and on March 4, 2025, it was announced that BluTV would be relaunched as Max on April 15, 2025, as part of WBD's global streaming consolidation strategy.

In Greece, the offer present in Vodafone TV was relaunched as Max on February 20, 2025, and all Max content was made available across all TV packages in Vodafone Greece. On January 13, 2026, marked the launch date of HBO Max as a standalone service in Greece.

On June 10, 2025, it was announced that HBO Max would finally launch in the Baltic states, as well as in other post-Soviet states, including Armenia, Georgia, Kazakhstan, Kyrgyzstan and Tajikistan, on July 22, 2025. Launches for Albania, Cyprus, and Malta were also announced for that same time frame.

===== United Kingdom, Ireland, Germany, Switzerland, Austria, and Italy =====
Under a long-term agreement until 2025 between HBO and Sky Group (Comcast), Sky operates Sky Atlantic which broadcasts the majority of HBO's programming. Sky Atlantic is available in the UK, Ireland, Germany, Switzerland, Austria, and Italy. In February 2011, Sky Atlantic launched on the Sky platforms in the United Kingdom and Ireland, which maintains a distribution deal with HBO to offer the majority of its programming on the channel. Under the five-year agreement between HBO and Sky, newer HBO programs will air on Sky Atlantic before airing on other television channels within the United Kingdom and Ireland. Before 2011, TG4 in Ireland had a long-term agreement to broadcast HBO programming free-to-air, this ceased following the creation of Sky Atlantic. In many other countries, HBO Max has licensed exclusive rights to its programming to television networks owned by third parties, including Sky Atlantic in the United Kingdom.

In March 2021, WarnerMedia confirmed that HBO Max would not launch in the UK, Ireland, Germany, Switzerland, Austria, and Italy before 2025 due to an existing deal for HBO programming with Sky Group which was renewed in 2019 but does not automatically include Max Originals produced by third-party companies or Warner Bros. Television themselves.

On December 9, 2024, Warner Bros. Discovery and Sky announced a brand new non-exclusive bundling partnership in the UK and Ireland, where HBO Max is expected to launch in March 2026. Following its launch, Sky customers will gain access to the ad-supported version of HBO Max at no additional cost.

HBO Max launched on January 13, 2026 in Germany, Italy, Austria, Switzerland, Luxembourg, and Liechtenstein. The service launched on March 26, 2026 in the UK and Ireland, completing its European roll-out.

==== Asia-Pacific ====
===== Australia and New Zealand =====
Fox Showcase, an Australian premium television service, began airing HBO original programming in 2012, through a licensed distribution arrangement with subscription television provider Foxtel. Before this, limited HBO content was broadcast through the now-defunct Movie Network, which was founded by HBO (through Time Warner), Village Roadshow, Metro-Goldwyn-Mayer and Disney–ABC International Television. HBO Originals are also available on-demand via Foxtel services Foxtel Now and Binge. Sky Movies in New Zealand originally operated as a joint venture between HBO and Sky Network Television. The channel was renamed HBO in 1993; Time Warner later sold its share in the service to Sky in 1998, and it was renamed back to Sky Movies. HBO programming is currently shown by Sky channel HBO, and its subscription streaming service Neon, in New Zealand. Deals with some other partners including Foxtel in Australia and Sky in New Zealand which includes a significant portion of HBO Max's original programming were agreed or renewed between 2019 and 2021.

Foxtel and Warner Bros Discovery renewed their partnership in February 2023, making HBO and Warner Bros. content available across Foxtel's pay-TV channels as well as its Foxtel Now and Binge streaming services. In mid-October 2024, Warner Bros. Discovery (WBD) and Sky New Zealand signed a new partnership agreement that would allow Sky to remain the exclusive distributor of both HBO and Max content in New Zealand from October 30, 2024. Under the partnership, Sky New Zealand would host Max as a hub on its Sky Box, Sky Pod and Sky Go platforms and its Neon streaming service. The SoHo channel would also be revamped as a linear HBO channel featuring HBO Original content.

On February 25, 2025, WBD announced that Max would be launched as a standalone service in Australia on March 31, 2025. Foxtel and Binge will lose access to most HBO and Max Originals, but Foxtel subscribers will be provided a 'Basic with Ads' plan at no extra cost if they have a compatible Foxtel IQ box. On February 17, 2026, WBD confirmed that it would be launching HBO Max as a standalone service in New Zealand from mid-2026. HBO Max was launched in New Zealand on June 16 as both a standalone service and as a bundle with Prime Video.

===== Southeast Asia, Hong Kong, Macau, Mongolia, and Taiwan =====
In June 2021, WarnerMedia appointed a managing director for the launch of HBO Max in eight territories across Southeast Asia.

In 2023, HBO Max was planned to launch in selected Southeast Asian countries and Hong Kong and Taiwan, but the launch was postponed until late 2024. Finally, the service launched as Max in Malaysia, Indonesia, Thailand, Singapore, the Philippines, Hong Kong, and Taiwan on November 19, 2024, replacing the HBO Go Asia services. The service later expanded to Brunei, Cambodia, Laos, Myanmar, Timor-Leste, as well as Macau and Mongolia on October 15, 2025.

HBO Max was launched in Vietnam on June 16, 2026, replacing the former HBO Go services.

===== India and South Asia =====
In June 2021, HBO Max has begun the exploration of the possibilities to launch HBO Max in the Indian market. Warner Bros. Discovery India decided to premiere their HBO Max original programming, including their original films, on Amazon Prime Video. It later started to gradually migrate to Viacom18's JioCinema from May 13, 2023 onwards and finished by late 2023. On February 14, 2025, JioCinema merged with Disney+ Hotstar to form JioHotstar which integrates HBO contents that were previously on JioCinema. On April 15, 2026, HBO Max was introduced as an integrated brand hub within JioHotstar in India, consolidating content from HBO, Warner Bros., DC, the Wizarding World, Max Originals, and selected Cartoon Network titles into a single platform, while Discovery+ remains available as a standalone service.

On September 15, 2025, WBD announced that HBO Max would be launched as a standalone service in Bangladesh, Pakistan, Nepal, and Sri Lanka on October 15, 2025. It later expanded to Bhutan and the Maldives on March 26, 2026.

===== Japan =====
In Japan, U-Next reached a deal to carry HBO and HBO Max original programs in Japan beginning on April 1, 2021. This replaced a previous deal between HBO and Amazon Prime Video Japan. This deal between Warner Bros. Discovery and U-Next was renewed in March 2023, making the streaming service the home of HBO content in the country in a "multi-year" deal between the two. On September 18, 2024, Warner Bros. Discovery signed an exclusive partnership agreement with U-Next. The deal allows Max to launch within the U-Next system featuring a library of more than 2,500 works and 16,000 episodes from 8 brands including HBO, Max Originals, Harry Potter, DC, Warner Bros., Cartoon Network, Discovery Channel, and Animal Planet. It officially launched on September 25, 2024. Starting on October 1, 2026, the HBO Max library would move to Hulu and Amazon Prime Video.

===== Mainland China and South Korea =====
In Mainland China and South Korea, HBO Max exclusively operates through third-party distribution partners.

In Mainland China, regulatory restrictions prevent HBO Max from operating as a standalone subscription service. Consequently, content distribution is conducted via licensing agreements with domestic digital platforms Tencent Video and Bilibili, respectively for TV series and for movies.

In South Korea, HBO Max content is distributed through specialized licensing agreements with local platforms SK Telecom (via the Wavve service) and Coupang Play. As of March 21, 2025, Coupang Play became the exclusive streaming home for the full slate of HBO and Max original content in South Korea, and as of 2026 all Wavve-distributed contents migrated to Coupang Play.

==== Middle East and North Africa ====
OSN currently carries HBO, Discovery+, some Cartoon Network series, some Warner Bros. movies and series content across 22 countries in the Middle East and North Africa region on its linear channels as well as its OSN+ streaming service. An exclusive, multi-year licensing deal was renewed in March 2023, meaning a HBO Max launch is unlikely in this region in the near future.

== Launch ==
Availability of HBO Max, as of September 11, 2026: Available Available via partnership Upcoming launch Third-party distribution Not available

Launch rollout timeline
Release date	Country/territory	Refs.
May 27, 2020 (Note: The service was relaunched as "Max" on May 23, 2023, and later reverted to its original "HBO Max" branding on July 9, 2025.)	United States (Note: Including the territories of American Samoa, Guam, Northern Mariana Islands, Puerto Rico, and the United States Virgin Islands)	
June 29, 2021 (Note: The service was relaunched as "Max" on February 27, 2024, and later reverted to its original "HBO Max" branding on July 9, 2025.)	Anguilla	
June 29, 2021	Antigua and Barbuda	
June 29, 2021	Argentina	
June 29, 2021	Aruba	
June 29, 2021	Bahamas	
June 29, 2021	Barbados	
June 29, 2021	Belize	
June 29, 2021	Bolivia	
June 29, 2021	Brazil	
June 29, 2021	British Virgin Islands	
June 29, 2021	Cayman Islands	
June 29, 2021	Chile	
June 29, 2021	Colombia	
June 29, 2021	Costa Rica	
June 29, 2021	Curaçao	
June 29, 2021	Dominica	
June 29, 2021	Dominican Republic	
June 29, 2021	Ecuador	
June 29, 2021	El Salvador	
June 29, 2021	Grenada	
June 29, 2021	Guatemala	
June 29, 2021	Guyana	
June 29, 2021	Haiti	
June 29, 2021	Honduras	
June 29, 2021	Jamaica	
June 29, 2021	Mexico	
June 29, 2021	Montserrat	
June 29, 2021	Nicaragua	
June 29, 2021	Panama	
June 29, 2021	Paraguay	
June 29, 2021	Peru	
June 29, 2021	Saint Kitts and Nevis	
June 29, 2021	Saint Lucia	
June 29, 2021	Saint Vincent and the Grenadines	
June 29, 2021	Suriname	
June 29, 2021	Trinidad and Tobago	
June 29, 2021	Turks and Caicos Islands	
June 29, 2021	Uruguay	
June 29, 2021	Venezuela	
October 26, 2021 (Note: The service was relaunched as "Max" on May 21, 2024, and later reverted to its original "HBO Max" branding on July 9, 2025.)	Andorra	
October 26, 2021	Denmark (Note: Including the territories of the Faroe Islands and Greenland)	
October 26, 2021	Finland (Note: Including the Autonomous Region of Åland)	
October 26, 2021	Norway (Note: Including the territories of Svalbard and Jan Mayen)	
October 26, 2021	Spain	
October 26, 2021	Sweden	
March 8, 2022 (Note: The service was relaunched as "Max" on May 21, 2024, except in the Netherlands and Poland, and later reverted to its original "HBO Max" branding on July 9, 2025.) (Note: In the Netherlands, the service was relaunched with retaining the original name "HBO Max" on June 11, 2024.) (Note: In Poland, the service was relaunched as "Max" on June 11, 2024, and later reverted to its original name "HBO Max" on July 9, 2025.)	Bosnia and Herzegovina	
March 8, 2022	Bulgaria	
March 8, 2022	Croatia	
March 8, 2022	Czech Republic	
March 8, 2022	Hungary	
March 8, 2022	Kosovo (Note: Although Kosovo is not currently mentioned on HBO Max websites for political reasons, the service is available there and it was previously referenced in the Help Center before the rebrand to Max. The service's source code also includes references to the country.)	
March 8, 2022	Moldova	
March 8, 2022	Montenegro	
March 8, 2022	Netherlands (Note: Including the constituent country Sint Maarten, and the special municipalities of Bonaire, Sint Eustatius and Saba)	
March 8, 2022	North Macedonia	
March 8, 2022	Poland	
March 8, 2022	Portugal	
March 8, 2022	Romania	
March 8, 2022	Serbia	
March 8, 2022	Slovakia	
March 8, 2022	Slovenia	
June 11, 2024 (Note: In France, the service was launched as "Max", later was rebranding to "HBO Max" on July 9, 2025.) (Note: The service had a pre-launch in Belgium on June 11, 2024, with French and English content, and officially launched as "HBO Max" on July 1, 2024.)	France (Note: Including the country of Monaco, the sui generis collectivity of New Caledonia, the territory of French Southern and Antarctic Lands, the overseas collectivities of French Polynesia, Saint Barthélemy, Saint Martin, Saint Pierre and Miquelon and Wallis and Futuna, and the overseas regions and departments of French Guiana, Guadeloupe, Martinique, Mayotte and Réunion)	
June 11, 2024	Belgium	
September 25, 2024 (via U-Next) (Note: The service was launched as "Max", later rebranding to "HBO Max" on July 9, 2025.)	Japan	
October 30, 2024 (via Sky and Neon) June 16, 2026 (standalone service)	New Zealand	
November 19, 2024	Hong Kong	
November 19, 2024	Indonesia	
November 19, 2024	Malaysia	
November 19, 2024	Philippines	
November 19, 2024	Singapore	
November 19, 2024	Taiwan	
November 19, 2024	Thailand	
February 20, 2025 (via Vodafone Greece) January 13, 2026 (standalone service)	Greece	
March 31, 2025	Australia (Note: Including the external territories of Christmas Island, Cocos (Keeling) Islands, Heard Island and McDonald Islands and Norfolk Island)	
April 15, 2025	Turkey	
June 19, 2025 (via Megogo) October 14, 2025 (standalone service)	Ukraine	
July 22, 2025	Albania	
July 22, 2025	Armenia	
July 22, 2025	Cyprus	
July 22, 2025	Estonia	
July 22, 2025	Georgia	
July 22, 2025	Iceland	
July 22, 2025	Kazakhstan	
July 22, 2025	Kyrgyzstan	
July 22, 2025	Latvia	
July 22, 2025	Lithuania	
July 22, 2025	Malta	
July 22, 2025	Tajikistan	
October 15, 2025	Bangladesh	
October 15, 2025	Brunei	
October 15, 2025	Cambodia	
October 15, 2025	Laos	
October 15, 2025	Macau	
October 15, 2025	Mongolia	
October 15, 2025	Myanmar	
October 15, 2025	Nepal	
October 15, 2025	Pakistan	
October 15, 2025	Palau	
October 15, 2025	Papua New Guinea	
October 15, 2025	Solomon Islands	
October 15, 2025	Sri Lanka	
October 15, 2025	Timor-Leste	
October 29, 2025 (via Amediateka)	Azerbaijan	
October 29, 2025 (via Amediateka)	Uzbekistan	
January 13, 2026	Austria	
January 13, 2026	Germany	
January 13, 2026	Israel	
January 13, 2026	Italy (Note: Including the countries of San Marino and Vatican City)	
January 13, 2026	Liechtenstein	
January 13, 2026	Luxembourg	
January 13, 2026	Switzerland	
March 26, 2026	Bhutan	
March 26, 2026	Fiji	
March 26, 2026	Ireland	
March 26, 2026	Kiribati	
March 26, 2026	Maldives	
March 26, 2026	Marshall Islands	
March 26, 2026	Micronesia	
March 26, 2026	Nauru	
March 26, 2026	Niue	
March 26, 2026	Samoa	
March 26, 2026	Tonga	
March 26, 2026	Tuvalu	
March 26, 2026	United Kingdom (Note: Including the Overseas Territories of Bermuda, the British Indian Ocean Territory, the Falkland Islands, Gibraltar, Pitcairn Islands, Saint Helena and South Georgia and the South Sandwich Islands, and the Crown Dependencies of Guernsey, Isle of Man and Jersey)	
March 26, 2026	Vanuatu	
April 15, 2026 (via JioHotstar)	India	
June 16, 2026	Cook Islands	
June 16, 2026	Tokelau	
June 16, 2026	Vietnam	

== Current distribution partners ==
Country/territory	Partner (main services)	Expiry	Refs.
Belarus Russia Turkmenistan	Amediateka	N/A	
China	Tencent Video	N/A	
China	Bilibili (films only)	N/A	
MENA	OSN (OSN+)	N/A	
South Korea	Coupang Play	N/A	

== Reception ==
=== As HBO Max ===
HBO Max received mixed reception from media observers on launch. The range of available content was generally well received, but many commented on the likelihood of confusion with HBO's other since-deprecated streaming platforms, HBO Go and HBO Now, and the service's higher subscription price compared to other newly launched streaming platforms like Disney+. Television critics also expressed frustration that the library of original series (not including its former late night adult content) for sister network Cinemax was not originally available on HBO Max, though much of its output had arrived on the service by the end of 2021.

AT&T announced in July 2020 that HBO Max had nominally achieved 26.6 million subscribers after its first month of operation, including 23.6 million wholesale customers, primarily legacy HBO pay TV subscribers that were covered by new agreements that added access to HBO Max at no extra charge. However, only 4.1 million customers had activated their HBO Max accounts by the same date. The latter figure was seen by many observers as a disappointment, particularly in light of Disney+ having reached 10 million subscribers within a day of launch; The New York Times's media critic Ben Smith wrote that WarnerMedia had "badly botched" the launch.

However, AT&T executives contended that it had been a "flawless launch" citing increased customer engagement compared to HBO Now and overall growth in total subscriptions to either HBO or HBO Max (36.3 million, vs. 34.6 million HBO or HBO Now subscribers at the end of 2019), while acknowledging that there was more to do to persuade existing HBO subscribers to start using the HBO Max apps. Executives had previously noted that HBO Max was starting from a different place than other streaming services as it was building on the existing HBO subscriber base, and had to work within the constraints of many of HBO's pre-existing deals (such as those with Amazon and Roku).

In October 2020, AT&T revealed that the number of activated HBO Max subscribers had reached 8.6 million by the end of September, while the number of nominal (eligible) subscribers reached 28.7 million. The total number of HBO / HBO Max subscriptions in the U.S. also increased to 28 million. With an agreement being reached the following month with Amazon (which is reported to have had 5 million HBO subscribers through Prime Video Channels), the number of HBO Max-eligible subscribers is understood to have increased to over 33 million. In September 2022, Warner Bros. Discovery was sued by a shareholder, alleging that WarnerMedia had overstated the number of HBO Max subscribers by including unactivated subscriptions bundled with AT&T services.

=== As Max ===
Upon its launch, it was noted that Max had grouped directors and writers for its films and television series under a singular "creators" credit. The Directors Guild of America and Writers Guild of America West condemned the move amidst the 2023 Hollywood labor disputes. Max announced that they would fix the credits, agreeing with the outcry from the guilds regarding proper credit for its creators, noting the altered credits were a result of "an oversight in the technical transition" from HBO Max to Max. Deadline Hollywood reported the consolidation was a result of WBD's IT departments creating the "catch all" for the credits to be in place for launch, and that executives, who could have intervened, had been unaware of the single credit until the discourse arose online after its launch. Additionally, it was reported that it would take "weeks" to fix, given the service would need to make the adjustment on each platform. The credits would later be fixed, beginning in late June.

== See also ==
- List of streaming media services
