= Eszter Ónodi =

Hungarian actress (born 1973)

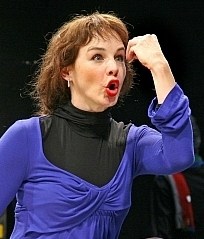
- Born: Eszter Kovács; 17 February 1973 (age 53); Budapest, Hungary
- Occupation: Actor

Eszter Ónodi (née Kovács; born 17 February 1973) is a Hungarian film and theater actress.

== Life ==
She obtained a Bachelor of Arts degree in English and Hungarian from ELTE Faculty of Humanities in 1999.

== Selected filmography ==
- Az alkimista és a szűz (1998) – Eszténa
- Portugál (1999) – Wife
- Meseautó (2000) – Vera
- A Kind of America (2002) – Eszter
- Boldog születésnapot! (2003) – Gyöngyi
- A Kind of America 2 (2008) – Eszter
- Aglaya (2012) – Sabine
- Anyám és más futóbolondok a családból (2015) – Mom
- Aranyélet (TV series (2015–) – Janka
