= Van Toffler =

American television executive

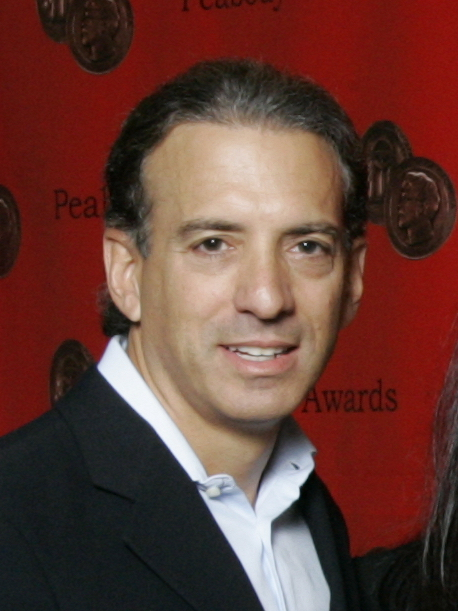
- Toffler at the 67th Annual Peabody Awards Luncheon in 2008
- Born: December 5, 1958 (age 66); Staten Island, New York, US
- Occupation(s): CEO of Gunpowder & Sky

Van Toffler (born December 5, 1958) is an American businessman who is the CEO of digital media production and distribution company Gunpowder & Sky, which he co-founded in 2016. He was formerly the President of Viacom Media Networks Music & Logo Group at Viacom from March 2008 to April 2015.

== Career ==
Toffler was the former President of Viacom Media Networks Music & Logo Group at Viacom from March 2008 until he announced on February 17, 2015 he was leaving Viacom Media Networks in April 2015 to "launch a content creation and acquisition company tentatively named Below the Radar. Toffler will be leaving his post in April, but will continue to executive produce a number of Viacom's flagship events including the VMAs, one of the signature franchises he launched." He joined the start-up networks in 1987. On February 19, 2015, Viacom announced that Doug Herzog would replace him.

In January 2016, Toffler, together with Floris Bauer and Otter Media formed Gunpowder & Sky, a digital content company aimed at millennials.

He was also an associate with the law firm of Kaye, Scholer, Fierman, Hays and Handler.

== Education ==
Toffler graduated from George W. Hewlett High School in 1976, The George Washington University in 1980 and has a Juris Doctor degree from the University of Pennsylvania (1983).

== Honors ==
In 2012, Billboard listed him as #35 in the Billboard Power 100.

In 2004, he was named the City of Hope's 2004 Spirit of Life honoree for "raising awareness of social and health issues through such programming as The Osbournes and Tom Green Cancer Special."

== Personal life ==
Toffler has two children, Matthew and Rachel, from his marriage to Cheryl Brahen (married July 12, 1987).
