= Heist 88 =

- Release poster
- Directed by: Menhaj Huda
- Written by: Dwayne Johnson-Cochran
- Produced by: Cherelle George
- Starring: Courtney B. Vance
- Cinematography: Thomas M. Harting
- Edited by: Tim Mirkovich
- Music by: The Angel
- Production companies: MTV Entertainment Studios; Gunpowder & Sky; Bassett Vance Productions
- Release date: September 29, 2023 (Paramount+)
- Running time: 84 minutes
- Country: United States
- Language: English

Heist 88 is a 2023 American crime drama film written by Dwayne Johnson-Cochran, directed by Menhaj Huda and starring Courtney B. Vance.

== Plot ==
Heist 88 is a crime drama inspired by the real life events of Armand Moore. The story follows Jeremy Horne (played by Courtney B. Vance), a charismatic criminal mastermind in Chicago. Set in 1988, just before stricter banking regulations were put in place, Horne sees one last chance to pull off a major score. He recruits four young bank employees—each disillusioned with their lives and eager for something more—to help him execute a daring scheme. The plan? To rob nearly $80 million from the banking system without ever touching a weapon. As Horne trains and manipulates the crew, they face temptations, moral dilemmas, and the lure of quick riches. But loyalty, trust, and greed test the fragile alliance. With the FBI closing in and the pressure mounting, Horne's smooth-talking confidence clashes with the harsh realities of betrayal and consequence. At its core, Heist 88 is about ambition, manipulation, and the cost of chasing easy money in a world about to change forever.

== Cast ==
- Courtney B. Vance as Jeremy Horne
- Keith David as Buddha Ray
- Keesha Sharp as Bree Newson
- Precious Way as Ladonna Page
- Nican Robinson as Rick Lewis
- Rebecca Spence as Harriet Weinstock
- Bentley Green as Marshall Green
- Mariah Gordon as Brandy
- Xavier Clyde as Danny Pugh

== Production ==
Vance had been attached to the project since 2017. Principal photography began in Chicago in August 2022.

In August 2022, MTV Entertainment Studios whom in which Angela Bassett and Courtney B. Vance had a first-look deal announced that they've joined the upcoming feature Heist 88 as they would produce the upcoming film with the two producers through its production company Bassett Vance Productions as the cast of the upcoming film was revealed.

In April 2023, Gunpowder & Sky had joined the upcoming film as co-producer.

== Release ==
The film was released on Paramount+ on September 29, 2023.

== Reception ==
The film has a 33% rating on Rotten Tomatoes based on six reviews.

J. Kim Murphy of Variety gave the film a negative review and wrote, "It's a crime film that finds little joy in criminality, crammed with characters who've been backed into a corner, hindered by an overarching morality that doesn't match the material."
