= Tony Goncalves =

Portuguese and American businessman

Tony Goncalves is a Portuguese-American media executive. He previously served as Chief Revenue Officer of WarnerMedia and Chief Executive Officer of Otter Media.

He is the founder of The Evrose Group, an advisory firm focused on companies operating between Portugal and the United States in the media, technology and entertainment sectors, and a co-founder of Open Cities, a Lisbon based film accelerator and production company supporting independent filmmakers. Goncalves also serves as executive producer of the Tribeca Festival Lisboa.

Goncalves created and hosts the podcast The Heart and Hustle of Portugal. The podcast features interviews with Portuguese artists, entrepreneurs and cultural figures with global influence and is the first English language podcast produced by Expresso. He also writes a monthly column for maisM, the marketing, advertising and entertainment platform of ECO Economia Online.

In addition to his media ventures, Goncalves serves as an advisor and mentor to businesses and entrepreneurs.

== Early life ==
Goncalves was born in Xertelo, a village in the Gerês region of northern Portugal. At the age of four he immigrated to the United States with his family, settling in Mount Vernon, New York, a city with a strong Portuguese American community.

His first job was delivering newspapers, earning $20 per week.

He earned a degree in Business Administration in Marketing from Iona University.

== Career ==
Goncalves joined DirecTV in 2007. During his decade-long tenure, he held various roles, eventually serving as Senior Vice President of Digital Entertainment Products, where he managed the company's digital media services and launch strategies.

Following AT&T's acquisition of DirecTV, Goncalves became Chief Executive Officer of Digital Brands for AT&T, and SVP of Strategy and Business Development where he participated in the strategy for the second Virtual PayTV provider, DirecTV Now.

In 2018 Goncalves was named Chief Executive Officer of Otter Media, a digital media company owned by The Chernin Group and AT&T.

During this period Otter Media was involved in several transactions, including the sale of Reese Witherspoon’s media company Hello Sunshine to Blackstone and the sale of the anime streaming platform Crunchyroll to Sony.

Goncalves then went on to become Chief Revenue Officer of WarnerMedia, where he managed revenue across brands including HBO, Warner Bros., CNN, TBS, TNT, Cartoon Network and Adult Swim. During the COVID-19 pandemic he led the development and global launch of HBO Max.

Since 2023 Goncalves has served as a strategic advisor to Grupo Impresa, one of Portugal’s leading media companies. His work has included advising on revenue strategy, growth opportunities and elements of the group’s strategic plan.

In 2026 Goncalves, together with Joana Vicente, Jason Kliot and Filipe de Botton, founded Open Cities, a Lisbon based film accelerator and production company focused on supporting independent filmmakers through financing, mentorship and emerging technologies including artificial intelligence.

He has also partnered with StreamTV Europe to launch the inaugural StreamTV Europe conference in Lisbon. The event brings together media and technology executives to discuss developments in streaming, content distribution and advertising in the European market.

=== Advisory and mentorship ===
In 2024 Goncalves founded The Evrose Group, an advisory firm focused on companies operating between Portugal and the United States in the media, technology and entertainment sectors.

He has served in advisory and mentorship roles with organizations including Mediaprobe, Unicorn Factory Lisboa and the Hynes Institute for Entrepreneurship and Innovation at Iona University.

=== Boards ===
Goncalves serves on the board of Upwardly Global, a nonprofit organization that assists immigrants and refugees in building professional careers in the United States.

== Awards and honors ==
- 2016 — Outstanding Leadership Award, Upwardly Global
- 2019, 2020, 2021 — Variety 500 Entertainment Leaders
