= Kills on Wheels =

2016 film

- Film poster
- Directed by: Attila Till
- Written by: Attila Till
- Starring: Szabolcs Thuróczy
- Release date: 28 April 2016
- Running time: 105 minutes
- Country: Hungary
- Language: Hungarian
- Box office: $23,375

Kills on Wheels (Hungarian: Tiszta szívvel) is a 2016 Hungarian black comedy crime film written and directed by Attila Till. It was selected as the Hungarian entry for the Best Foreign Language Film at the 89th Academy Awards but it was not nominated.

== Plot ==
Three young men who use wheelchairs, unsure of their future and lacking familial support, decide to become assassins for hire.

== Cast ==
- Szabolcs Thuróczy as Rupaszov
- Zoltán Fenyvesi as Zolika
- Ádám Fekete as Barba Papa
- Mónika Balsai as Zita
- Lídia Danis as Évi

== See also ==
- List of submissions to the 89th Academy Awards for Best Foreign Language Film
- List of Hungarian submissions for the Academy Award for Best Foreign Language Film
