= Otter Media =

American media company

Otter Media Holdings, LLC
- Type: Subsidiary
- Industry: Mass media
- Founded: April 2014; 12 years ago
- Defunct: May 31, 2019; 7 years ago
- Fate: Folded into WarnerMedia Entertainment
- Headquarters: Santa Monica, California, U.S.
- Key people: Tony Goncalves (CEO); Andy Forssell (COO); Sean Kisker (CSO)
- Products: OTT Services; Digital Networks; Film Production; Film Distribution; Online Television Programming; Events
- Operating income: $500 million (2014)
- Number of employees: 1,400 (2018)
- Parent: AT&T (2014–2019); The Chernin Group (2014–2018); Warner Bros. Entertainment (2019)

Otter Media Holdings, LLC was an American digital media company owned by AT&T. The company was founded in April 2014 by AT&T and The Chernin Group as a holding company of the anime streaming service Crunchyroll, in which the latter invested in 2013.

In addition to Crunchyroll, it owned Rooster Teeth and held an ownership stake in Gunpowder & Sky with Floris Bauer. AT&T would later acquire the remaining stake of Otter Media in 2018, which the subsidiary was folded into the WarnerMedia subsidiary, and later divested Crunchyroll to Sony Pictures Television's subsidiary company Funimation Global Group, LLC in 2021.

== History ==
In April 2014, AT&T and the Chernin Group established Otter Media as the 50:50 joint venture to offer OTT services.

In January 2016, Otter Media invested in Van Toffler (former CEO of Viacom Media Networks Music Group) and Floris Bauer's Gunpowder & Sky, a digital content company, which eventually merged with FilmBuff. In November 2016, Otter Media and actress Reese Witherspoon formed Hello Sunshine, a joint venture focused on telling female-driven stories on film, TV, and digital platforms; the company was later sold to a media company backed by the Blackstone Group.

In January 2018, Otter Media bought the remaining stake in Ellation, the owner of VRV and Crunchyroll, and integrated it as Otter Media's Consumer Division. On June 20, 2018, Recode reported that AT&T could buy Chernin's stake in Otter Media, ahead of its acquisition of Time Warner (whose digital media holdings included Machinima). On August 7, 2018, AT&T announced their acquisition of Chernin Group's stake in Otter Media for an undisclosed amount, believed to be around $1 billion. On August 22, 2018, Ellation formed Ellation Studios, a production studio with facilities in both the U.S. and Japan, to produce original content for Crunchyroll and VRV. On December 4, 2018, Otter announced a broad restructuring that would result in the layoff of about ten percent of its staff. As part of the reorganization, Machinima, which had been part of Warner Bros. Digital Networks, was re-organized under Otter Media. Ellation will now house Rooster Teeth, Crunchyroll, and VRV, while Machinima became a unit of Fullscreen.

On March 4, 2019, following the reconstruction of WarnerMedia's businesses, Otter Media became part of Warner Bros. Entertainment. However, on May 31, it was folded into the WarnerMedia Entertainment division.

On December 9, 2020, Sony-owned Funimation Global Group, LLC announced its acquisition of Crunchyroll from WarnerMedia for $1.175 billion. The deal was finalized on August 9, 2021.

== Assets ==
- Rooster Teeth - formerly a division of Warner Bros. Discovery Global Streaming and Interactive Entertainment
- Fullscreen - team laid off and company absorbed into WBD Ad Sales
  - McBeard
  - Reelio
  - Machinima, Inc. - merged into Fullscreen in 2019
- Hello Sunshine (joint venture with Reese Witherspoon, Seth Rodsky and Emerson Creative) - sold
- Ellation – sold to Sony's Funimation Global Group in 2021
  - Crunchyroll
  - Crunchyroll EMEA
  - VRV
  - Crunchyroll Expo
  - Crunchyroll Anime Awards
  - Crunchyroll Games
- Gunpowder & Sky (Joint venture with Floris Bauer)
