= Be 1 =

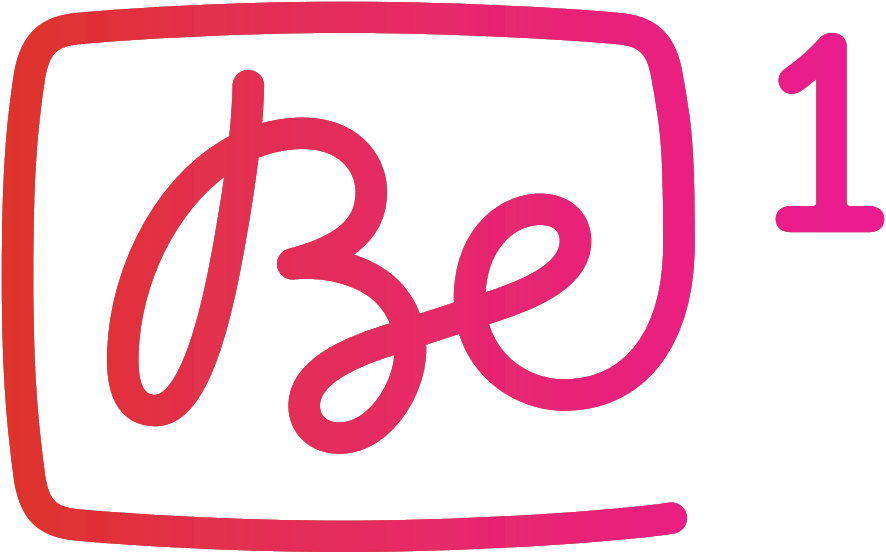
- Country: Belgium
- Broadcast area: Belgium

Ownership
- Sister channels: Be 3D; Be Séries; Be Ciné

History
- Launched: 29 October 2004
- Former names: Canal+ Belgique

Links
- Website: Official site of Be TV

Availability

Terrestrial
- Analogue: Liège: Channel 39
- Analogue: Wavre: Channel 50
- Analogue: Anderlues: Channel 58
- Analogue: Léglise: Channel 63
- Digital: Brussels: Channel 63

Be 1 is a Belgian premium television channel, owned by BeTV.

== History ==
Be 1 is the successor of Canal+ Belgique. In 2004, BeTV announced Canal+ would become Be 1. The channel is owned 100% by the group BeTV.

== Programmes ==
Be 1 broadcasts many programmes made by Canal+ France.

- Le Grand Journal
- Les Guignols de l'info
- 7 jours au Groland
- + clair
- Al Dente
- Fais pas le sorcier

== Transmission ==
In 2007 Conseil supérieur de l'audiovisuel (CSA) announced that Be 1 would stop broadcasting via the analogue network on 31 December 2007 because its contract linking it with RTBF, the owner of television transmitters in Belgium, would end on that date.

== See also ==
- Canal+
