= Aranyélet =

Hungarian television series

- Genre: Crime drama
- Created by: Mikko Pöllä; Roope Lehtinen
- Written by: István Tasnádi; Virág Zomborácz; Márton Bárány
- Directed by: Áron Mátyássy; Zsombor Dyga
- Starring: Szabolcs Thuróczy; Eszter Ónodi; Renátó Olasz; Laura Döbrösi; Zsolt Anger; Zsolt Végh
- Opening theme: "Family" by Fancy Dress Party
- Country of origin: Hungary
- Original language: Hungarian
- No. of series: 3
- No. of episodes: 24

Production
- Running time: 48-57 minutes

Original release
- Network: HBO Hungary
- Release: 8 November 2015 – 2 December 2018

Aranyélet ([ˈɒrɒɲeːlɛt]; Golden Life) is a Hungarian crime drama television series loosely based on Finnish series Helppo elämä. The show was produced by HBO Europe and originally aired from November 8, 2015 to December 2, 2018 on HBO Hungary starring Szabolcs Thuróczy, Eszter Ónodi, Renátó Olasz, Laura Döbrösi and Zsolt Anger. After the commercial and critical success of the first season, HBO Europe renewed Aranyélet for a second season, which premiered on November 6, 2016. The complete third and final season was released via HBO Go on October 14, 2018, and premiered on the same day on HBO Hungary and on all of the European HBO3 channels.

== Plot ==
Attila Miklósi (Szabolcs Thuróczy) provides his family a rich and easy life in the elite suburb of Budapest. Their fortune is based on his mostly low-profile criminal activities. When Attila's father dies, he decides to give up his way of living and become a decent person, however, this transformation challenges the very foundations of his family.

== Cast and characters ==
=== Main cast ===
- Szabolcs Thuróczy as Attila Miklósi, an entrepreneur making a living from various crime-related activities
- Eszter Ónodi as Janka Miklósi, Attila's wife
- Renátó Olasz as Márk Miklósi, Janka and Attila's son
- Laura Döbrösi as Mira Miklósi, Janka and Attila's daughter
- Zsolt Anger as Endre Hollós, Attila's old-time friend and business partner in crime
- Zsolt Végh (Season 2–3) as Ferenc Gál, former partner and friend of Attila and Endre

=== Recurring cast ===
- Tamás Lengyel as Tibor Miklósi, Attila's brother
- Béla Mészáros as Zsolt Komáromi, police officer
- Éva Vándor as Klári, the Miklósis' neighbour
- Sándor Lukács as Ambrus, Klári's husband
- Franciska Farkas as "Oszi", Mira's friend

== Concept ==
Although being a remake of a Finnish series, Aranyélet is only loosely based on the original material, and from the show's second episode on the plot develops differently. The creators intended to reflect more on the Hungarian society involving new themes and characters.

== Reception ==
=== Critical reception ===
Aranyélet has received widespread critical acclaim and has been praised by many critics as the greatest Hungarian television show of all time.

After the first season, IGN Hungary wrote "Aranyélet is not just the best Hungarian television series ever made, but it is also one of HBO's best thrillers. It is characterized by steadily high-quality acting and creative work, a great plot and perfect way of storytelling, not to mention the unforgattable characters, who are defined by our problems, our narrow-mindedness, and our country. Be very proud of them." Player.hu wrote "Without doubt, HBO's original crime family drama seems to be the best Hungarian series, every actor is a perfect choice, it looks good, and tells the story in an excellent way. What's more, it is quite addictive."

The second season met with positive critical reception as well, IGN Hungary described the season as "more exciting, crazier, darker, has more plot twists, but it is more human than the first season. In conclusion despite the exaggerations and being too action-packed sometimes, it is still a masterpiece, which makes our expectations even higher for the next round."

Season 3 met mixed reviews - critics praised the season's political themes, acting, and being even more reflective on Hungarian politics and corruption in general, while many criticizing the plot, character development and the ending. Judit Lola Bodnár from 24.hu wrote "[…] the final season of Aranyélet knows no mercy: it reflects [the Hungarian reality] so much, that only those won't see the country in it who live in total ignorance." Tamás Hauschel from Player.hu wrote "The third season of Aranyélet was the best thing that could happen to Hungarian television", while Zsolt Sarkadi from 444.hu wrote "HBO's once promising series turned into the most shameless garbage".

== In other media ==
Aranyélet had a great impact on Hungarian pop culture with Anger's character, Endre Hollós became the breakout character of the show. Anger reprised his role as Hollós in Hungarian pop-rap duo Wellhello's music video Hentesék and in a television promo on RTL Klub advertising the Christmas broadcast of Home Alone with Thuróczy as Attila Miklósi. The characters wore the costumes of Harry and Marv, as a reference to Home Alone.

Eszter Ónodi also reprised her role as Janka Miklósi in a fake campaign video for mayoral election in the fictional town of Szentvázsony.
