= Larger Than Life: Reign of the Boybands =

2024 documentary film

Larger Than Life: Reign of the Boybands is a 2024 documentary film which explores the rise of the boy band from The Beatles, the 90s/2000s boy bands, to contemporary K-pop.
