= The Informant (TV series) =

Hungarian television series

The Informant (Hungarian title: A besúgó) is a television series produced for HBO Max and created by Bálint Szentgyörgyi. The series follows a pro-democracy movement emerging at a Budapest-based university in 1985. It was a huge success among local audiences, and became the most watched HBO Max content in Hungary in both April and May 2022, even surpassing The Batman, released on the platform simultaneously. The series was nevertheless critiqued by some academics, who found the depiction of the opposition to the communist government to be inaccurate.

The series was removed from HBO Max in June 2022 as a result of the Warner Bros. Discovery merger. It was added to SkyShowtime in March 2023, as part of an acquisition deal, which includes 21 previously removed European HBO Max originals.
