= HBO Portugal =

Portuguese video on demand streaming service

HBO Portugal was a streaming service of video on demand under fixed subscription offered by HBO Max Nordic, which provides a catalogue of own productions of the American cable television channel HBO, a subsidiary of WarnerMedia, owned by AT&T. It also has films, series and documentaries from the other properties of WarnerMedia, as well as from other international studios. The platform changed its name to HBO Max on 8 March 2022, which in turn was briefly changed the name once again to Max on 21 May 2024, before it reverted again into HBO Max on 9 July 2025.

== History ==
In 2019, Vodafone Portugal confirmed the agreement with HBO Portugal that will allow the operator's clients to access the streaming service. HBO Portugal's official website has been launched. This action gave the operator's non-customers the opportunity to use the platform on mobile devices, tablets and computers.

The availability of the service was launched with a catalogue of films, series, documentaries and other HBO productions for 4.99 euros per month.

HBO Portugal is a brand of HBO Nordic, a subsidiary of HBO Europe, which from 2012 offers on-demand fixed subscription services in countries such as Denmark, Finland, Norway and Sweden (HBO Nordic is owned by Home Box Office, Inc, a subsidiary of WarnerMedia, LLC).

As in Spain, the service works by subscription from the HBO Portugal website. Once the user has registered, he or she receives one month of the entire catalogue service free of charge. If the user is not satisfied with the service, he can cancel his subscription one day before the end of the month without any cost. At the end of the free month, a fixed monthly fee is charged. Customers who have contracted Vodafone TV services have between three months and two years of free subscription to HBO Portugal, depending on the package contracted with the Vodafone operator.

HBO Portugal has the entire HBO catalogue (United States) on its platform.

For each registered user, it is possible to connect up to five different devices, regardless of the platform used. It is not possible to add more, but you must remove one of the five devices to change the device. To enjoy the content, it is necessary to download the official HBO Portugal application to the devices through different digital distribution platforms for mobile applications.

The maximum playback quality allowed by the platform is 1080p, a resolution in HD.

HBO Portugal was replaced by HBO Max on 8 March 2022, which in turn was replaced for once again by Max on 21 May 2024, before it has reverted again into HBO Max on 9 July 2025. Existing customers will be automatically migrated.

== Programme ==
The entire catalogue of the American channel HBO (series, films, documentaries), as well as its sister channel Cinemax, are available on request in Portuguese territory.
