= Be TV (Belgium) =

Belgian cable television platform

BeTV
- Type: Société anonyme
- Industry: Broadcasting
- Genre: Pay TV
- Founded: 29 August 2004; 22 years ago
- Headquarters: Evere, Belgium
- Area served: Belgium and Luxembourg
- Products: Nº HD Channel = Be 1 HD - 40; Be 1 +1h HD - 41; Be Séries HD - 42; Be Ciné HD - 43
- Website: www.betv.be

Be TV (formerly Canal+ Belgique) is a Belgian cable television platform launched on 29 August 2004, when the former platform Vivendi sold Canal+ Benelux.

== History ==
Be TV was operated on August 29, 2004, as Canal+ Belgique, the first (now defunct) cable television in Belgium, but Vivendi sold Canal+ Belgique in 2004. Be TV is a successor of Canal+ Belgique.

== Description ==
The platform offers many channels, and HBO Max may be included for an additional fee.

The company headquarters are in Evere, Belgium,, and broadcasts in Belgium and Luxembourg.

== Sponsorships ==
The "Be Tv" Award is awarded in the National Competition of the Brussels Short Film Festival, by which Be TV acquires broadcasting rights of the winning film.

== See also ==
- Vivendi
- Canal+
