= Warner Bros. Discovery =

Former American mass media and entertainment conglomerate

Warner Bros. Discovery, Inc.
- Type: Public
- Traded as: Nasdaq: WBD (2022–2026); Nasdaq-100 component (2022–2026); S&P 500 component (2022–2026)
- ISIN: US9344231041
- Industry: Media; Entertainment
- Predecessors: Discovery, Inc.; WarnerMedia
- Founded: April 8, 2022; 4 years ago
- Defunct: October 6, 2026; 47 days ago
- Fate: Acquired by Paramount Skydance
- Successor: Skydance
- Headquarters: 230 Park Avenue South, New York City, United States
- Area served: Worldwide (except Russia, Belarus and North Korea)
- Key people: Samuel DiPiazza (chairman); David Zaslav (president and CEO); John C. Malone (chairman emeritus)
- Brands: List: HBO Max/HBO; Warner Bros. Entertainment; Discovery/Discovery+; CNN/CNN International; Turner Broadcasting System; DC Entertainment; TNT Sports International; Cartoon Network; New Line Cinema; Science Channel; American Heroes Channel; Asian Food Network; Bleacher Report; Destination America; Turner Classic Movies
- Revenue: ▲US$37.3 billion (2025)
- Operating income: ▲US$738 million (2025)
- Net income: ▲US$727 million (2025)
- Total assets: ▼US$100.1 billion (2025)
- Total equity: ▲US$37.1 billion (2025)
- Number of employees: 35,500 (2025)
- Divisions: Streaming and Studios; Global Linear Networks
- Website: wbd.com (Archived October 5, 2026, now redirects to skydance.com)

Warner Bros. Discovery, Inc. was an American multinational mass media and entertainment conglomerate headquartered in New York City. It was formed on April 8, 2022, by the merger of Discovery, Inc. with AT&T subsidiary WarnerMedia, with the latter being the successor of Kinney National Company and Time Inc.

Warner Bros. Discovery operated via two divisions: Streaming & Studios and Global Linear Networks. Streaming & Studios included the flagship Warner Bros. studios, HBO, DC Entertainment, and streaming services such as HBO Max and Discovery+. Global Linear Networks largely included advertising-supported cable networks. Those networks were inherited from its predecessors Discovery (such as the Discovery Channel among others), Scripps Networks Interactive (such as HGTV among others), and Turner Broadcasting System (such as CNN, TBS, and TNT among others). Warner Bros. Discovery International was also included in the division, which managed broadcasting operations outside of the United States.

In June 2025, Warner Bros. Discovery announced plans to spin off the less-profitable Global Linear Networks division, and its debt– into a separate company called Discovery Global, retaining the more profitable Streaming & Studios division as Warner Bros. However, on October 21, 2025, the company changed course and was put up for sale, resulting in a bidding war that involved Paramount Skydance, Comcast, and Netflix. In December 2025, Netflix won the bidding war to buy the Streaming & Studios business for $82.7 billion– but was later outbid by Paramount Skydance, which made a $110.9 billion offer for the entire company on February 24, 2026; with the acquisition agreement confirmed three days later. The acquisition closed on October 6, 2026, with Paramount Skydance being restructured and renamed Skydance; and its stock was transferred to the New York Stock Exchange under the ticker symbol "SKYD".

== Background ==
=== 1923–1979 ===
Warner Bros., Turner Broadcasting System, Scripps Networks Interactive, and Discovery, Inc. have conjoined histories. Warner Bros. was founded on April 4, 1923, by four brothers, Harry, Albert, Sam, and Jack Warner in Hollywood. Warner Bros. established itself as a leader in the American film industry before diversifying into animation, television, and video games. It is one of the "Big Five" American film studios, as well as a member of the Motion Picture Association (MPA). In 1965, Turner Broadcasting System was founded by Ted Turner in Atlanta, Georgia. A year later, Kinney National Company came into existence. It reincorporated as Warner Communications in 1972.

=== 1979–1996 ===
In 1979, Warner Communications formed a joint venture, with credit card company American Express, called Warner-Amex Satellite Entertainment. American Express acquired a 50% stake in Warner Communications' cable television holdings for $175 million. This company owned such cable channels as MTV, Nickelodeon, The Movie Channel, and VH1 (which was launched in 1985 on the channel space left by Turner's Cable Music Channel). Warner Communications bought American Express's half in 1984 and sold the venture a year later to the original iteration of Viacom, which renamed it MTV Networks (now known as Paramount Media Networks). In 1982, Warner Communications purchased Popular Library from CBS Publications. Warner Communications merged with Time Inc. in 1990 to become Time Warner.

In 1982, Cable Education Network was founded, launching The Discovery Channel three years later. It was named Discovery Communications in 1994.

=== 1996–2021 ===
Time Warner acquired Turner Broadcasting System in 1996, allowing it to reenter the cable industry. In 2001, it merged with America Online (AOL) to form AOL Time Warner, but the merger proved disastrous, and the company reverted to its former name, Time Warner, in 2003. Time Warner spun off its cable division (later known as Spectrum, owned by Charter Communications) and AOL (later owned by Yahoo! Inc.) in 2009, and Time Inc. in 2013, which was later acquired by Meredith Corporation, which became Dotdash Meredith.

2019–2022 WarnerMedia logo

In 2018, Discovery Communications acquired Scripps Networks Interactive (a 2008 spin-off from E. W. Scripps Company's cable division) and was renamed Discovery, Inc. AT&T acquired Time Warner, becoming WarnerMedia. In 2019, AT&T integrated its related assets into Warner's business divisions as part of its reorganization, effectively breaking up Turner Broadcasting System.

== History ==
=== Formation (2021–2022) ===
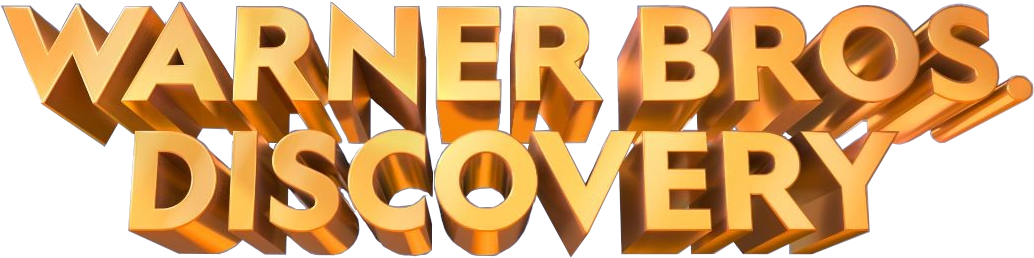
The company's initial wordmark logo

On May 17, 2021, AT&T and Discovery announced that AT&T would spin off WarnerMedia to its shareholders, which in turn would be merged with Discovery Inc. to form Warner Bros. Discovery (WBD). The merger would be structured as a Reverse Morris Trust, with AT&T shareholders holding a 71% interest in the new company's stock and appointing seven board members, and Discovery shareholders holding a 29% interest and appointing six board members. AT&T would receive US$43 billion in cash and debt. The merger was expected to be completed in mid-2022.

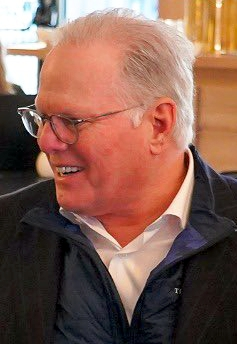
Zaslav in February 2026

The merged company would be led by Discovery's CEO, David Zaslav; WarnerMedia's CEO Jason Kilar's position in the new company was uncertain. Zaslav stated that the two companies would spend a combined US$20 billion annually on content (outpacing Netflix). The company aimed to expand their streaming services, which included WarnerMedia's HBO Max, to reach 400 million global subscribers.

On June 1, 2021, it was announced that the merged company would be known as Warner Bros. Discovery, and an interim wordmark was unveiled with the tagline "The stuff that dreams are made of"—a quote from the 1941 Warner Bros. film The Maltese Falcon, itself paraphrasing Shakespeare's The Tempest.

In an SEC Filing on November 18, 2021, Discovery revealed that talks with AT&T had fallen through, in April 2021, due to disagreements over the ownership of the new company between AT&T and Discovery shareholders, and the amount of debt transferred to Discovery when they merged with WarnerMedia, before talks resumed on May 17, 2021.

In November 2021, during an earnings call, Discovery Streaming CEO JB Perrette discussed possible options for its Discovery+ streaming service post-merger, including bundling the service with HBO Max and eventually merging the two under a single platform with a mixture of both companies' technologies. He noted that WBD may prioritize launching Discovery+ and HBO Max as a unified platform in markets where Discovery+ had yet to launch, such as parts of the Asia-Pacific region.

On December 22, 2021, the transaction was approved by the European Commission. On January 5, 2022, The Wall Street Journal reported that WarnerMedia and Paramount Global (at the time named ViacomCBS) were exploring a possible sale of either a majority stake or all of The CW, and that Nexstar Media Group was considered a leading bidder. The reports also indicated that WarnerMedia and ViacomCBS could include a contractual commitment that would require any new owner to buy new programming from those companies, allowing them to reap some continual revenue through the network. The CW's then-president-and-CEO Mark Pedowitz confirmed talks of a potential sale in a memo to CW staffers, but added that "It's too early to speculate what might happen."

On January 26, 2022, AT&T CEO John Stankey stated that the merger was expected to close sometime during the second quarter of 2022. On February 1, 2022, it was reported that AT&T had finalized the structure of the merger: WarnerMedia would be spun off pro rata to AT&T's shareholders, and then merge into Discovery Inc. to form the new company. The transaction was approved by the Brazilian antitrust regulator Cade on February 7, followed by the United States Department of Justice on February 9. On March 11, 2022, the merger was approved by Discovery's shareholders. Due to the structure of the merger, it did not require separate approval from AT&T shareholders.

Textless version of the Warner Bros. Discovery logo. It is based on the 1999 variant of the 1998 Warner Bros. Pictures on-screen logo.

In an SEC filing on March 25, 2022, AT&T stated that two-way trading of WBD stock with that of AT&T would begin on April 4, 2022, and that a special dividend would be issued the next day to give AT&T shareholders a 0.24 share in WBD for each share of AT&T common stock they held. The merger was officially completed on April 8, 2022. Trading began on Nasdaq on April 11. At this time the company unveiled its final logo, designed by Chermayeff & Geismar & Haviv, which features a rendition of Warner Bros.' long-time shield logo. The company also had a new tagline, "Our story starts with you".

The combined company retained several top executives from WarnerMedia, including film and television heads Toby Emmerich and Channing Dungey, and HBO and HBO Max chief content officer (CCO) Casey Bloys. Most of the company's top executive roles were filled by their Discovery counterparts, including Gunnar Wiedenfels as Warner Bros. Discovery's chief financial officer (CFO), JB Perrette as president and CEO of global streaming and interactive, and Discovery's chief lifestyle brands officer Kathleen Finch—whose role was expanded to cover most of the combined company's U.S. linear networks, besides CNN (which was taken over by Chris Licht, replacing the outgoing Jeff Zucker)— Magnolia Network (which reported to Bloys, after reporting directly to Zaslav under Discovery), and the Turner Sports unit (which would be overseen by the newly formed Warner Bros. Discovery Sports division).

In an introductory town hall hosted by Oprah Winfrey, Zaslav stated that the combined company would need to have "one culture" that "starts with people feeling safe, people feeling valued for who they are", as opposed what he described as a culture of internal competition between WarnerMedia's businesses. He expected that "investment avoidance" via the consolidation of redundant business units (such as streaming) and staff would be one of the main ways for the company to achieve its promised $3 billion in cost savings. On April 21, 2022, Licht and Perrette announced the shutdown of CNN's streaming service CNN+, which had launched only two weeks prior to the completion of the merger; the new leadership considered it to be incompatible with their goal of a unified streaming service for WBD properties.

In an investors' call on April 26 (concurrent with the first quarter earnings reports for Discovery Inc., its last prior to the merger), Zaslav contrasted the company's streaming businesses with Netflix (whose stock declined after a quarterly loss in subscribers), describing Warner Bros. Discovery as a "far more balanced and competitive company" that would "invest at scale smartly" and not "overspend" on growth and that its streaming businesses would complement its linear networks. He stated that HBO Max had "meaningful subscriber churn", and that the planned merger of it with Discovery+ would help to reduce churn by offering a broader content mix. It was reported that the company had suspended scripted development at TBS and TNT, to evaluate their strategies. The following day, Zaslav purchased approximately $1 million worth of WBD stock.

On May 11, 2022, Warner Bros. Discovery eliminated several executive positions carried over from WarnerMedia, including Kids, Young Adults and Classics head Tom Ascheim, and general manager of TBS, TNT, and TruTV Brett Weitz. These networks would be overseen by Finch as head of U.S. Networks, while the studios and one network under the Kids, Young Adults and Classics division (Warner Bros. Animation, Cartoon Network Studios, Turner Classic Movies and Hanna-Barbera Studios Europe) was moved under Warner Bros. Television. That day, WBD announced an agreement with British telecom company BT Group for it to contribute its BT Sport channels in a 50/50 joint venture with its UK Eurosport channels, and eventually merge them.

On June 1, 2022, Warner Bros. Pictures head Toby Emmerich announced his departure to establish a new studio, to be funded and distributed exclusively (for five-years) by Warner Bros. Pictures. Warner Bros. Pictures was then divided into three business units with separate leadership: former MGM executives Michael De Luca and Pamela Abdy became the co-chairs of Warner Bros. Pictures and New Line Cinema, and temporarily oversaw the DC Films and Warner Animation Group units. Eight days later, WBD named former Discovery and Univision executive Luis Silberwasser as chairman of Sports. In July 2022, Alan Horn rejoined Warner Bros. as a consultant.

WBD delivered its second-quarter earnings report on August 4, 2022. Ahead of the report, the company performed surgery on HBO Max, including cutting new programming development in much of Europe, live-action children's programming development, and direct-to-streaming films—including notable August 3 cancellations of the nearly completed films Batgirl and Scoob! Holiday Haunt as tax write-offs—and the quiet removals of multiple HBO Max original films from the platform along with upcoming releases.

In the second quarter of 2022, WBD showed $9.8 billion in revenue and a net loss of $2.2 billion pro forma, primarily from integration and restructuring expenses. The company took $825 million in write-offs on "content impairments and development". The company confirmed cuts to children's program development, and abandoned the production of direct-to-streaming films for HBO Max—with Zaslav arguing that they lacked economic value and impact in comparison to theatrical releases. WBD renewed its contracts with Bloys and other key HBO executives; Zaslav praised Bloys' performance as chief content officer. Zaslav stated that a "10-year plan" was in development for DC Films, modeled after those of Marvel Studios, while Perrette stated that the planned merger of Discovery+ and HBO Max would occur by summer 2023 in the United States, followed by other markets.

HBO subsequently reorganized on August 15 to dismantle most of HBO Max's autonomous units. HBO Max's head of comedy Suzanna Makkos began reporting to HBO's head of comedy Amy Gravitt. Layoffs hit HBO Max's non-scripted, live-action family entertainment, international originals, and casting units, as well as HBO's acquisitions unit. HBO Max also continued to remove and cancel some of its lesser-viewed original programming, particularly family-oriented and animated series.

On August 15, 2022, Nexstar confirmed that it would buy a controlling 75% interest in The CW; WBD and Paramount would each retain a 12.5% ownership interest. Nexstar stated that Mark Pedowitz would remain its chairman and CEO. WBD and Paramount would remain the network's main content suppliers, but Nexstar stated that the arrangement would be for the 2022–23 broadcast season, and it retained the option to extend the partnership. As the transaction did not require regulatory approval (unlike the "Big Four" networks, The CW does not own stations), Nexstar immediately took over the network's operations.

In September 2022, WBD became the subject of a proposed class-action lawsuit by one of its shareholders, alleging that WarnerMedia was over investing in streaming content "without sufficient concern for return on investments", and had overstated the number of HBO Max subscribers by at least 10 million by counting unactivated subscriptions bundled with AT&T services—thus misleading investors in violation of the Securities Act. It also alleged that Discovery executives failed to warn investors that WarnerMedia's prospectus contained misleading statements.

On September 28, during a company town hall, Zaslav addressed speculation that WBD was pursuing a possible sale as early as 2024, stating that it was "absolutely not for sale", and "[we] have everything we need to be successful". On October 11, Warner Bros. Television Group laid off 82 employees and eliminated 43 vacant positions as part of a restructuring that primarily impacted its unscripted and animation units. The restructuring saw the consolidation of Warner Horizon's and Telepictures' creative operations, and the consolidation of Cartoon Network Studios' and Warner Bros. Animation's development and production teams (with the two studios retaining separate labels with distinct output).

On October 3, 2022, Nexstar closed its deal to acquire a controlling interest in The CW. Mark Pedowitz resigned from his position as the network's chairman and CEO, replaced by Dennis Miller as president. Later that month, it was announced that filmmaker James Gunn and producer Peter Safran would serve as co-CEOs and co-chairs of DC Films which rebranded as DC Studios. The duo signed a four-year deal to oversee film, television, and animation production for DC. The pair reported directly to Zaslav, while working independently with other members of the studio. Gunn would oversee creative development on DC projects, while Safran took the business aspect. A November 2022 earnings report announced that the launch of WBD's streaming service had been moved up to spring 2023. Max was unveiled April 12, 2023. In December 2022, CNN announced cutbacks and a reorganization to prioritize its "core" operations, resulting in sister channel HLN being brought under the auspices of Investigation Discovery and abandoning its remaining original live news programming.

=== Declining turnover, cutbacks and restructuring (2023–2025) ===
In January 2023, WBD announced licensing agreements with free ad-supported streaming television (FAST) services The Roku Channel and Fox Corporation's Tubi, featuring library content from Discovery, TLC, HGTV, Food Network, Warner Bros. Pictures, Warner Bros. Television, and HBO (including series that were pulled from HBO Max).

On February 8, 2023, The Wall Street Journal reported that WBD had amended its plans to merge Discovery+ with HBO Max, with HBO Max's successor slated to include "most" Discovery content, and Discovery+ remaining operational to retain its subscriber base, and provide an alternative option for customers not interested in the higher-priced unified service. On February 24, WBD CEO David Zaslav confirmed the change of plans, saying that Discovery+ has "profitable subscribers that are very happy with the product offering".

In early-June, Licht was fired from CNN. On June 20, WBD underwent a round of layoffs affecting around 100 employees in the U.S. Networks division, most notably including multiple Turner Classic Movies (TCM) executives such as Pola Changnon (who had been with Turner for over 25 years). WBD announced plans to place the channel under Cartoon Network head Michael Ouweleen. It was also reported that WBD was preparing a deal to sell half of the published music catalog of Warner Bros. Entertainment (the catalog contains film and television scores, and is administered by Universal Music Publishing Group) for around $500 million. Amid concerns over the future of TCM, Martin Scorsese, Steven Spielberg, and Paul Thomas Anderson met with Zaslav, and on June 23 the company announced that the channel would move under Warner Bros. Pictures Group heads Michael De Luca and Pamela Abdy—who both affirmed the cultural significance of TCM and pledged to keep its programming "untouched and protected".

In December 2023, WBD announced the purchase of Turkish streaming platform BluTV, with operations in the MENA region. On February 16, 2024, RedBird Capital Partners (via its United Arab Emirates-backed partnership RedBird IMI) announced its intent to acquire All3Media—a WBD joint venture with Liberty Global—for £1.15 billion. The acquisition was completed on May 16, 2024.

In April 2024, Warner Bros. Discovery New Zealand announced that it would shut down Newshub (which produced bulletins for its free-to-air channel Three) in July 2024, citing declining local advertising revenue. Newshub was supplanted by a partnership with local media company Stuff, which launched an evening newscast under the ThreeNews banner. In July 2024, CNN CEO Mark Thompson announced 100 layoffs. A week later, additional WBD employees at Max and in production, business affairs, and finance were also let go.

On July 24, the NBA announced new media rights agreements with Disney (ESPN and ABC), NBCUniversal (NBC and Peacock), and Amazon Prime Video beginning with the 2025–26 season, ending a nearly 36-year association between the NBA and TNT. WBD had attempted to invoke a condition in its contract allowing it to match offers made by competitors (targeting the package sold to Amazon), but the league argued that it did not sufficiently match Amazon's offer. WBD threatened legal action, claiming that the NBA had "grossly misinterpreted our contractual rights".

In August, WBD reported that it had lost $10 billion in the second quarter of 2024, relating to continued losses from its direct-to-consumer segment and the devaluation of its linear television assets.

In November, WBD agreed to a settlement with the NBA that allowed TNT Sports continued access to highlights for its digital platforms Bleacher Report and House of Highlights, international rights for selected markets in Nordic Europe and South America, a package of Big 12 Conference basketball and football games sublicensed from ESPN, and an agreement for TNT Sports to continue producing its popular NBA studio show Inside the NBA to air on ESPN and ABC in conjunction with their own NBA coverage.

On December 12, 2024, Zaslav announced a restructuring of WBD into two divisions, known as "Streaming & Studios" and "Global Linear Networks"; the reorganization was to allow for greater flexibility and "potential future strategic opportunities", separating the company's cable television operations from its more profitable studio and direct-to-consumer businesses (including Warner Bros., HBO, and Max).

On March 24, 2025, WBD announced that it would buy a 30% minority stake in Dubai-based OSN Streaming Limited for $57 million.

In July 2025, WBD announced that it would divest its New Zealand television operations Three and ThreeNow to local competitor Sky Network Television for $1. WBD would be retaining its subscription television and production operations in the region.

=== Attempted separation and sale to Paramount Skydance (2025–2026) ===
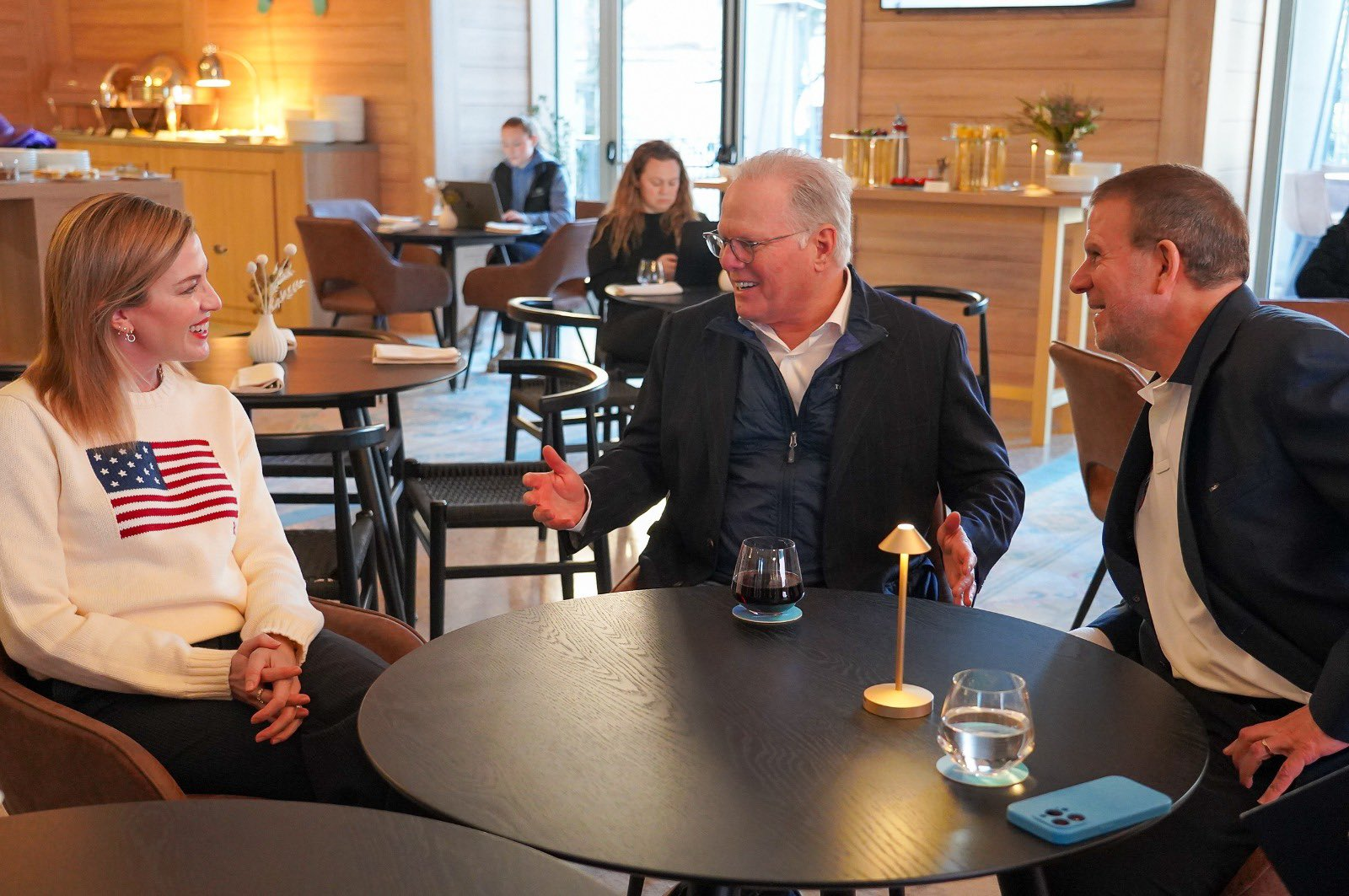
Zaslav during a meeting with United States ambassador to Italy and San Marino Tilman Fertitta in February 2026

On June 9, 2025, WBD announced plans to split its two operational units into separate companies. The two companies—which would later be referred to as "Warner Bros." and "Discovery Global"—would be led by Zaslav and WBD CFO Gunnar Wiedenfels, respectively. The transactions were expected to be completed by mid-2026; the split was structured to be tax-free, with Discovery Global assuming Warner Bros.' debt. On September 10, 2025, Zaslav stated that the split was on track for completion by April 2026.

On September 11, 2025, The Wall Street Journal reported that David Ellison—who had recently acquired Paramount Global via Skydance Media—was exploring a bid to acquire the entirety of WBD via Paramount Skydance. Such an acquisition would integrate overlapping assets between the two companies, including two of the five major film studios (Warner Bros. and Paramount Pictures), streaming services HBO Max and Paramount+, TNT Sports and CBS Sports, and CNN and CBS News. An analyst suggested that the bid was meant to preempt potential interest in the studio's business post-split, and take advantage of a "period of industry-wide instability". WBD's share prices increased by 33% following the reports.

Paramount made multiple unsolicited bids in October 2025, insisting that its offers would "[deliver] superior value" to shareholders in comparison to the previously-proposed split. On October 31, Netflix, Inc. was reported to be actively exploring a bid for the studio and streaming unit; the company stressed that it remained "predominantly focused on growing organically", and was not interested in WBD's legacy linear television businesses. On November 20, Paramount Skydance, Netflix, and Comcast (which was in the process of similarly divesting its cable television assets) formally submitted bids; Comcast and Netflix made cash-and-stock and mostly-cash bids for the studio's company, respectively, while Paramount Skydance made an all-cash offer for the entirety of WBD, backed by debt financing from Apollo Global Management and Middle-Eastern sovereign wealth funds.

While WBD initially accepted a $72 billion offer from Netflix to acquire the streaming and studios division (valuing WBD as a whole at $82.7 billion), Paramount Skydance argued that its bid would face fewer regulatory obstacles than the Netflix offer, arguing that Netflix wanted to use WBD's properties to enrich their dominant position in streaming and cut back on theatrical releases. Netflix co-CEO Ted Sarandos stated that Netflix would break from its usual streaming-first strategy and continue to release films theatrically through Warner Bros. with a standard 45-day window, arguing that Warner's films represented "billions of dollars" of potential revenue.

Paramount Skydance subsequently made multiple hostile bids in December and February, with the later bids offering to cover Netflix's breakup fee, and pay WBD shareholders a "ticking fee" of approximately $650 million per-quarter if the acquisition would not close by the end of 2026, as a display of confidence that regulatory approval would be achieved quickly. Ellison stated that a combined Paramount–WBD would commit to releasing 30 "high-quality" theatrical films per-year, maintain theatrical and home video windows, continue acquiring third-party content, and continue to allow HBO to operate independently. Paramount's chief legal officer Makan Delrahim stated that the acquisition would give it the economy of scale needed to compete in the streaming market with Disney and tech companies such as Amazon and Netflix, and that Paramount would continue to respect a 45-day theatrical window to "create momentum behind films before they reach streaming services."

On February 26, 2026, Warner Bros. Discovery confirmed that it considered Paramount's updated bid to be superior to Netflix's current offer. Netflix subsequently declined to increase its bid, stating that the deal was "no longer financially attractive." On February 27, 2026, Paramount Skydance confirmed its deal to acquire all of Warner Bros. Discovery for $110 billion. The deal was expected to be closed by September 30, 2026, at the earliest. On April 23, 2026, WBD's shareholders approved the sale to Paramount Skydance. However, an offer to have the sale include a golden parachute for Zaslav and other WBD executives was rejected.

The Paramount offer faced the possibility of antitrust issues due to its horizontal integration of two legacy media conglomerates and film studios, and a resulting reduction in viewpoint diversity; such a merger would resemble the larger Disney acquisition of 21st Century Fox in 2019. Concerns were raised that Paramount would utilize its market position in box office and cable television share to increase its leverage over cinemas and television providers, and over the editorial independence of CNN, citing the changes made to CBS News after the Paramount Skydance merger (including appointing right-wing commentator Bari Weiss as editor-in-chief). Delrahim contrasted the purchase to the Disney–Fox merger, stating that the merged company would not consolidate studios nor cut back on theatrical releases, with the promised slate of 30 films being split evenly between Paramount and Warner Bros., and with both studios "[maintaining] full staff to support production and distribution."

On June 12, 2026, the sale was approved by the U.S. Department of Justice's Antitrust Division. The deal was approved by the European Commission in July 2026, with Paramount being required to exit its United International Pictures distribution venture with Universal, not enter into any distribution agreements with Universal in the European Economic Area (EEA) for 10 years, and—in the 19 European territories that UIP served—not enter into distribution agreements for Warner Bros. films with companies that distribute Disney and/or Universal films in that territory. The United Kingdom's minister for culture imposed conditions on its television operations, requiring the merged company to not combine linear and on-demand services for five years, maintain editorial independence among its news (including CNN and 5 News) and children's divisions, and maintain its commitments to UK-produced programming for 5.

On July 13, 2026, California and 11 other states filed an antitrust lawsuit in the U.S. District Court for the Northern District of California, seeking to halt the acquisition. The lawsuit argued that the combined company's control of a quarter of U.S. box office and cable television revenue would give it undue leverage on film exhibitors and television providers, respectively, and that the company could still "harm competition by reducing investment and innovation, degrading quality, and raising the price of those 30 films they produce." The Writers Guild of America (WGA) filed its own lawsuit the next day, stating that the acquisition would give Paramount the incentive to reduce output and suppress writers' wages. On July 20, Judge Araceli Martínez-Olguín granted a two-week temporary restraining order in the California lawsuit. On July 23, Judge Martínez-Olguín extended the temporary restraining order through August 17, 2026, in order to provide more time for legal proceedings, after which Paramount Skydance entered a joint stipulation promising to not close the WBD acquisition until June 1, 2027, or a ruling in the antitrust case, whichever comes first. A trial was scheduled for March 2027, while Paramount would become subject to the aforementioned "ticking fee" beginning in October 2026.

AMC Theatres, Cinemark, Regal Cinemas, and the trade association Cinema United all called for Paramount and California attorney general Rob Bonta to reach a settlement, stating that they were confident that Ellison would adhere to his commitments to theatrical releases, and believed that a prolonged antitrust trial could cause uncertainty within the film industry. California governor Gavin Newsom also pushed for a settlement, arguing that blocking the acquisition would be detrimental to the state's job market; reports emerged that Ellison had considered beginning the process of relocating Paramount out of California to a different, Republican-led state (such as Georgia, Tennessee, or Texas) as early as October if it could not settle with Bonta.

In mid-August 2026, Paramount demanded that the plaintiffs pay a $1.8 billion bond on the antitrust case to cover legal and regulatory costs, including the cost of the "ticking fee" to March 2027, citing obligations under the Clayton Act and the Federal Rules of Civil Procedure. Bonta criticized the move as blackmail, arguing that Paramount had wilfully negotiated the "ticking fee" while being fully aware that the deal would face antitrust scrutiny. On August 26, 2026, the states of Iowa and Montana filed a motion for leave to file a bill of complaint in the U.S. Supreme Court, seeking to halt the antitrust trial, considering it "politicized antitrust enforcement by a small handful of states seeking to enjoin a $110 billion merger that the United States, most American states, and competition regulators worldwide have cleared." Paramount made a court filing similarly arguing that the 12 states "lack[ed] regulatory authority over the merger, which is vested in the U.S. Department of Justice".

On September 17, 2026, the Federal Communications Commission approved a waiver for Paramount's increased foreign ownership following the acquisition. On September 21, 2026, California announced that it had reached an out-of-court settlement that would allow Paramount's acquisition of WBD to move forward. Paramount agreed to a five-year consent decree that requires Paramount to uphold its promised investments in film production (including the 30-film quota, as well as specific commitments to spending $1.5 billion over five years on productions in the United States, and $5 million per-year into acquiring independent films), restrictions on how the company negotiates with cinemas and television providers, and establishing an independent oversight board to ensure that CNN and CBS News adhere to editorial independence and practice ethical journalism, among other provisions. In a memo to staff, Ellison stated that the sale would be completed in "approximately two weeks". However, on September 29, 2026, it was reported that Paramount Skydance's share price had dropped 3%, was 25% below its year-begin price, and that the company had marketed $44.4B in secured notes to acquire Warner Bros. Discovery.

On September 30, 2026, it was reported that Paramount intended to complete the Warner Bros. acquisition on October 6, 2026. It was also reported that the company's new name and logo would be announced before this date.

On October 2, 2026, co-chairs and CEOs of Warner Bros. Pictures Pamela Abdy and Michael De Luca announced that they would exit after the closing of the acquisition by Paramount. It was also announced that the combined entity would be known as Skydance.

On October 6, 2026, it was announced that Paramount Skydance had completed its acquisition of Warner Bros. Discovery.

== Assets ==
Warner Bros. Discovery included two primary business divisions: Streaming & Studios and Global Linear Networks.

Streaming & Studios had the following divisions:

- Warner Bros. Entertainment
  - Warner Bros. Motion Picture Group included the company's filmed entertainment and theatrical entertainment businesses, including Warner Bros. Pictures, New Line Cinema, Warner Bros. Pictures Animation, Warner Bros. Clockwork and Castle Rock Entertainment. The division was led by Michael De Luca and Pamela Abdy.
  - Warner Bros. Television Group included domestic and international television production companies, including the flagship Warner Bros. Television label, Telepictures, Alloy Entertainment, Warner Bros. Animation, Cartoon Network Studios, and Warner Horizon Unscripted Television, and Turner Classic Movies. The division was led by Channing Dungey.
  - DC Studios oversaw DC Comics and was the film and series production site of WBD for DC media in the new film and series franchise DC Universe. The division was led by James Gunn and Peter Safran. It continues to operate under Skydance in its original structure as it did under WBD.
- Warner Bros. Streaming managed the company's direct-to-consumer platforms, online brands, and gaming businesses, including HBO Max and TNT Sports International. It also housed Home Box Office, Inc., the parent company of HBO, and Cinemax.
- Warner Bros. Discovery Global Experiences managed Warner Bros. theme parks and studio tours. Additional business segments included divisions responsible for Global Content Distribution (Warner Bros. Worldwide Television Distribution), and Advertising Sales.
- Other components included Warner Bros. Theater Ventures, Warner Bros. Games, Warner Bros. Home Entertainment, Turner Entertainment Co., The Wolper Organization, WaterTower Music, and Warner Bros. Studio Operations.

Global Linear Networks included the company's linear cable networks, such as Discovery+, Discovery Channel, TLC, Animal Planet, Oprah Winfrey Network, Investigation Discovery, Food Network and Cooking Channel, HGTV, TBS, TNT, TruTV, and The Cartoon Network, Inc. (Cartoon Network, Adult Swim, Boomerang, and Williams Street). The division was also led by Channing Dungey.

- CNN Worldwide operates CNN and other news assets owned by Warner Bros. Discovery, including various international CNN branches and HLN. The division is led by Mark Thompson. It continues to operate under Skydance in its original structure as it did under WBD.
- TNT Sports is the brand name that was used by WBD for the sports-related divisions. The American division managed the company's domestic broadcast sports businesses, including MLB Network (formerly NBA TV), the sports media website Bleacher Report, and previously AT&T SportsNet until it shut down in 2023, while the European division handled international sports operations, including Eurosport and TNT Sports UK, and Warner Bros. Discovery Sports Latin America, which owned the sports channel TNT Sports LATAM which replaced Esporte Interativo. Both divisions were led by Luis Silberwasser.
- Warner Bros. Discovery International focused on local and regional variations that pipeline with global market through operations for its domestic television channels, including region-specific operations such as TVN Group in Poland, as well as the distribution of linear networks from CNN Worldwide and TNT Sports, including Eurosport. The division was led by Gerhard Zeiler. It was split into four regional hubs: Warner Bros. Discovery Asia-Pacific, Warner Bros. Discovery EMEA, TVN Warner Bros. Discovery (Poland), and Warner Bros. Discovery Americas.

Warner Bros. Discovery used to have a minority share in Vox Media and it held a minority share in All Elite Wrestling, before the stake was transferred to Skydance.

== Leadership ==
Board of directors

- Samuel A. DiPiazza Jr. (chair)
- John C. Malone (chair emeritus)
- David Zaslav (president and CEO)
- Richard W. Fisher
- Paul A. Gould
- Debra L. Lee
- Joey Levin
- Anton Levy
- Kenneth W. Lowe
- Fazal Merchant
- Anthony Noto
- Paula A. Price
- Daniel E. Sanchez
- Geoffrey Y. Yang

Executives

- David Zaslav, president and CEO
  - Pamela Abdy and Michael De Luca, co-chair and CEO Warner Bros. Motion Picture Group
  - Priya Aiyar, chief legal officer
  - Casey Bloys, chairman and CEO, HBO and HBO Max content
  - Bruce Campbell, chief revenue and strategy officer
  - Channing Dungey, chairman and CEO, Warner Bros. Television Group and US Networks
  - Robert Gibbs, chief communications and public affairs officer
  - Amy Girdwood, chief people and culture officer
  - James Gunn and Peter Safran, co-chairman and CEO of DC Studios
  - JB Perrette, CEO and president, global streaming and games
  - Asif Sadiq, chief inclusion officer
  - Avi Saxena, chief technology officer
  - Luis Silberwasser, chairman and CEO of TNT Sports
  - Mark Thompson, chairman and CEO, CNN Worldwide
  - Gunnar Wiedenfels, chief financial officer
    - Dave Duvall, chief information officer
    - Lori Locke, chief accounting officer
  - Gerhard Zeiler, president, International
