= Go90 =

American video streaming service

go90
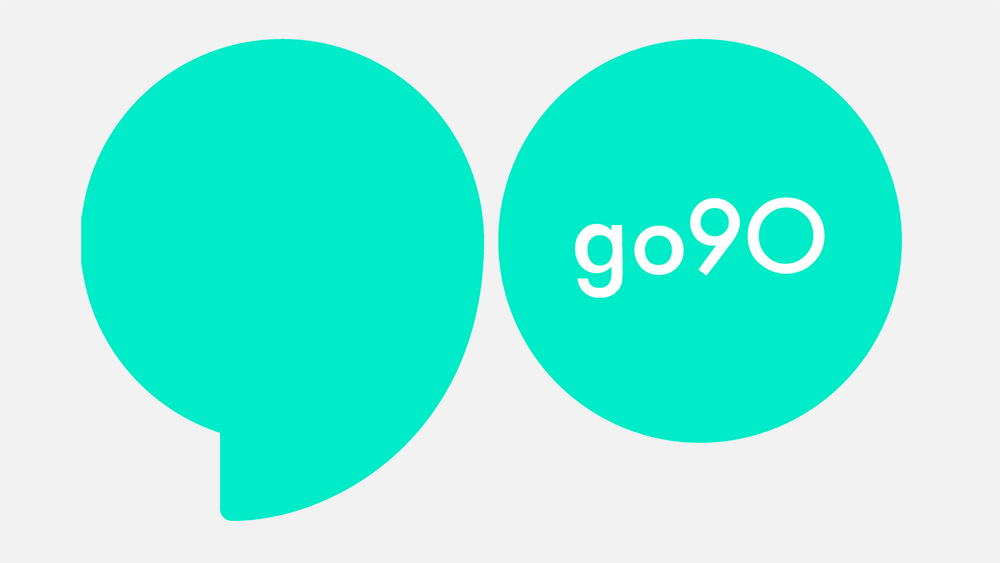
- Industry: Online video
- Founded: October 1, 2015; 11 years ago
- Defunct: July 31, 2018; 8 years ago
- Headquarters: United States
- Key people: Brian Angiolet (SVP Chief Content Officer), Richard Tom (GM and CTO, Verizon Digital Entertainment)
- Products: Streaming service Television; Movies
- Owner: Verizon Communications
- Website: www.go90.com

go90 was an American Internet television service and mobile app owned and operated by Verizon Communications. The service was positioned as a mobile-oriented "social entertainment platform" targeted primarily towards millennials, featuring a mixture of original and acquired content from various providers. The service was available exclusively within the United States.

The service was plagued by an unsuccessful launch, credited to poor content discoverability and a lack of firm content strategy, resulting in managerial turnover. Including acquisitions that became the basis of the service (such as Intel's OnCue project, and later Vessel), it was estimated that Verizon had spent $1.2 billion on the service.

On July 31, 2018, after attempts to promote go90's content via Verizon's AOL and Yahoo! properties (including blogging platform Tumblr), the service was shut down.

== History ==
In January 2014, Verizon acquired the talent and assets of OnCue—a then-planned subscription streaming service in development by Intel—for around $200 million. In September 2015, Verizon unveiled a streaming service based on the assets, known as go90. It was described as being a mobile-first "social entertainment platform" targeting millennial demographics, featuring video content from various partners, as well as features such as the ability to join "crews" related to shows, and to create clips from its shows and share them on social networks. The name "go90" referred to the practice of rotating a smartphone to landscape orientation to watch videos, a 90-degree rotation. Verizon planned to leverage ad technology and content assets it acquired in its purchase of AOL, and to release 50-55 new, short episode series.

Brian Angiolet, Verizon's senior vice president of consumer products, served as initial head of the service. Chip Canter, formerly of NBCUniversal, was brought on as general manager in March 2016, and hired Ivana Kirkbride, formerly of YouTube, as chief content officer. Under Canter, the service's content strategy shifted to one focusing on a wider variety of content in genres that had been performing well, such as gaming, music, sci-fi, sports (including live events), and dramas targeting young women. The service also planned to take a more granular approach to content acquisition, and lessen its aggressive focus on primarily targeting mobile platforms.

Under Angiolet's direction as Global Content Chief, Verizon made multiple investments and acquisitions in an effort to bolster go90. In April 2016, Verizon acquired a 24.5% stake in AwesomenessTV, a digital media studio and YouTube MCN targeting youth and teenagers, for around $159 million (valuing AwesomenessTV at $650 million). DreamWorks Animation and Hearst Corporation also owned stakes in the company. Verizon invested $180 million over multiple years for AwesomenessTV to produce content for go90. A joint venture with Hearst, Verizon Hearst Media Partners, also acquired Complex Media in a deal reportedly valuing the company at $250 to $300 million.

=== Failed launch, Vessel acquisition ===
Despite high expectations from Verizon, go90's first year of operations was unsuccessful; partners reported that their content was drawing a minuscule audience (with most content only receiving view counts within the thousands, although some, such as The Runner, were able to reach at least a million), and that even under Canter's leadership, the service lacked clear content and distribution strategies. Digiday reported via go90 employees that Verizon's executives "were so consumed early on with the idea of providing a large quantity of high-quality content, that they never showed any focus. There was no indication that Verizon actually knew the audience that they were trying to reach." Insiders also noted that not enough internal metadata was provided to categorize go90's videos, which hampered search and discoverability. Verizon hired contractors to manually compose this information in a process only intended to take three months, however, the process took nearly a year to complete. In May 2016, Verizon CEO Lowell McAdam admitted that go90 may have been "a little bit overhyped," backpedaling on previous pronouncements and the implications of major business and media investments.

On October 26, 2016, Verizon acquired Vessel, a streaming video startup led by former Hulu executives Jason Kilar and Richard Tom. The purchase was a talent acquisition, resulting in Vessel being shut down at the end of the month, and its staff re-assigned to work on go90. Kilar departed from the company. On January 23, 2017, it was reported that Verizon had laid off 155 go90 employees from its San Jose office, which had been displaced by the acquired Vessel staff. Tom was appointed as chief technology officer of Verizon Digital Entertainment. During Verizon's fourth-quarter earnings report the next day, it was revealed that average daily usage of the go90 app was "consistent sequentially at about 30 minutes per viewer." In early February, a Verizon spokesperson told FierceVideo that the service had seen organic growth over the past two months.

In late March 2017, go90 released a significant redesign of its mobile app, which was designed to help improve discovery and content recommendations and prioritize live content (such as sports) within the interface. The redesign also incorporated the "motion poster" concept for advertisement displays that originated from Vessel. Chip Canter was replaced as general manager in April 2017 by Tom. The following month, it was reported that go90's app had 2.1 million average monthly users.

== Original content ==
go90 featured original series, such as Mr. Student Body President, My Dead Ex, The Runner (which was produced by Ben Affleck and Matt Damon), T@gged, Tween Fest, Street Fighter: Resurrection and Transformers: Prime Wars Trilogy. Its original series were acquired from studios such as CollegeHumor, Funny or Die, Nerdist Industries, Machinima, MTV, and Rooster Teeth Productions, among others., as well as producers like Ben Affleck, Matt Damon, LeBron James, and Rob Gronkowski (who hosted and executive produced a Shark Tank-like series entitled MVP for two seasons).

In 2017, go90 began a three-year deal with the National Women's Soccer League (NWSL) to stream all matches not aired on television.

=== Original series ===
Title	Genre	Premiere	Seasons/Episodes	Status
Betch	Comedy	October 1, 2015	4 season, 42 episodes	Ended
Guidance	Teen drama	October 18, 2015	3 season, 27 episodes	Ended
The Bacca Chronicles	Animation; Adventure; Comedy	November 24, 2015	1 season, 10 episodes	Ended
Lizzie	Animation	January 22, 2016	1 season, 13 episodes	Ended
Street Fighter: Resurrection	Action	March 15, 2016	1 season, 4 episodes	Ended
Relationship Status	Drama	April 29, 2016	3 season, 35 episodes	Ended
Miss 2059	Science fiction Comedy	June 21, 2016	2 season, 24 episodes	Ended
The Runner	Reality	July 1, 2016	1 season, 30 episodes	Ended
T@gged	Teen drama	July 19, 2016	2 season, 23 episodes	Moved to Hulu (season 3)
Transformers: Prime Wars Trilogy	Science fiction Animation	August 2, 2016	3 season, 28 episodes	Ended
Tween Fest	Comedy	August 3, 2016	1 season, 8 episodes	Ended
Rush	Drama; Action	September 20, 2016	1 season, 5 episodes	Ended
Mr Student Body President	Comedy	September 22, 2016	4 season, 40 episodes	Ended
Sleep Tight	Horror	October 4, 2016	1 season, 9 episodes	Ended
The Movement	Docuseries	October 10, 2016	1 season, 12 episodes	Ended
Raising Heaven	Docuseries	October 24, 2016	1 season, 6 episodes	Ended
Happy Wheels: The Series	Adult animation Comedy	November 15, 2016	1 season, 9 episodes	Ended
Thankgiving	Comedy	November 16, 2016	1 season, 8 episodes	Ended
Embeds	Comedy	January 18, 2017	1 season, 6 episodes	Ended
Drive Share	Sketch Comedy	January 30, 2017	1 season, 30 episodes	Ended
QB1: Beyond the Lights	Documentary; Sports	February 13, 2017	2 season, 20 episodes	Moved to Netflix (season 3); Tubi (season 4)
Confess	Drama	April 7, 2017	1 season, 7 episodes	Ended
Snatchers	Horror Comedy	June 22, 2017	1 season, 8 episodes	Ended
Threads	Comedy; Thriller	July 25, 2017	1 season, 20 episodes	Ended
Explosion Jones	Adult animation Action	September 5, 2017	1 season, 12 episodes	Ended
In the Vault	Drama; Thriller	September 13, 2017	1 season, 8 episodes	Moved to Crackle (season 2)
Two Sentence Horror Stories	Horror; Anthology	October 3, 2017	1 season, 5 episodes	Moved to The CW (season 2-4)
Zac & Mia	Drama	November 7, 2017	1 season, 12 episodes	Moved to Hulu (Season 2)
Love Daily	Drama; Anthology	February 7, 2018	1 season, 7 episodes	Ended
Rebel Without a Crew: The Series	Reality	March 19, 2018	1 season, 12 episodes	Ended
My Dead Ex	Teen comedy	March 20, 2018	1 season, 8 episodes	Ended
Ture North	Docuseries	April 19, 2018	1 season, 15 episodes	Ended

=== Continuations ===
Title	Genre	Previous network	Premiere	Seasons/Episodes	Status
Defining Beauty	Reality	The Platform	March 2, 2016	1 season, 5 episodes	Ended

=== Cancelled ===
Title	Genre	Notes
Oishi: Demon Hunter	Adult animated adventure	

== Reception ==
From the onset, Mari Silbey of Light Reading felt that much of go90's library consisted of content that could already be found elsewhere, and contested whether Verizon's planned original content for the service would be compelling enough. In addition, Silbey argued that go90's announced social networking features were not inherently innovative for a video service and that it was "hard to turn social media features into a driving force for popularity." Advertisers had been critical of the service, citing slower user adoption than expected. Warren Zenna of Havas Media felt that the app's user experience was inferior to that of YouTube.

Concerns were also displayed over Verizon's announced intent to not have go90 content count towards its subscribers' data caps, noting the company's stance against net neutrality.

The NWSL's streams on go90 faced sustained criticism from sportswriters: The Equalizer felt that the app was buggy and did not have the same wide device support as YouTube, while it was also argued that the relative obscurity of go90, and the inconsistent quality of the matches' streams, could harm the league's growth. After repeated technical issues, the league would live-stream several weeks of matches domestically on the NWSL website.

== Demise ==
By 2017, as the service faltered, insiders suggested that Verizon had been aggressively overpaying on content deals (describing the company as having made deals "guns blazing"), on the assumed basis that making large content investments would ensure growth.

Verizon subsequently acquired Yahoo!, and merged it with AOL into the subsidiary Oath. Its lead executive Tim Armstrong stated in February 2018 that go90 had been placed within the Oath division, but would likely be wound-down in the future. Armstrong admitted that go90 was a "super ambitious project", but that it was difficult to build its brand, and that its content deals could be better leveraged by Oath's individual properties instead. In March 2018, Oath-owned blog platform Tumblr began to syndicate some of go90's original series internationally—which Digiday considered as being a pilot project for this strategy.

After the more aggressive promotion of its content across AOL and Yahoo properties, go90 had managed to increase its average monthly user count to 17 million. On June 29, 2018, Oath officially announced that go90 would shut down on July 31, 2018. The company stated that it would be evaluating the future of go90's original series and that it would "focus on building its digital-first brands at scale in sports, finance, news and entertainment for today's mobile consumers and tomorrow's 5G applications."

Estimates vary on the losses attributed to the failed service. Digiday cited two sources close to go90 who estimated total spending of $1.2 billion, including the Vessel and OnCue acquisitions. In Verizon's filing for the third quarter of 2018, it cited $913 million in charges related to "product realignment" attributable to shutting down go90. In September 2018, Verizon laid off 50 employees in the Content Operations group managed by Brian Angiolet and eliminated the group. Ivana Kirkbride and Richard Tom were among the departing employees.

At least two of the initiatives launched by Verizon Hearst Media Partners—Seriously.TV and Rated Red—were shuttered in 2017 and 2018 respectively. In 2018, AwesomenessTV was sold to Viacom for $50 million—a fraction of Verizon's $650 million valuation. Digiday reported that the company had depended strongly on content investments by Verizon for around 40% of its revenue, and that there had been animosity within the venture due to its majority partner DreamWorks Animation being acquired by Verizon competitor Comcast (via NBCUniversal). Comcast did not believe that AwesomenessTV aligned well with its other digital media investments, such as BuzzFeed and Vox Media. In June 2021 as part of its upcoming IPO, BuzzFeed announced that it would acquire Complex Media from Verizon Hearst Media Partners.

For the final year of its contract with Verizon Media, go90's rights to the NWSL would move to Yahoo Sports for the 2019 season, and the league then signed with CBS Sports and Twitch for the 2020 season.

== See also ==
- Quibi
