= Gerhard Zeiler =

Austrian businessman (born 1955)

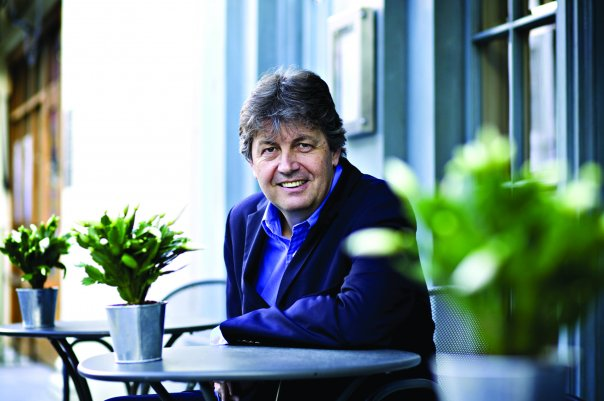
Zeiler in 2012

Gerhard Zeiler (born 20 July 1955) is an Austrian businessman who was most recently the president of Warner Bros. Discovery International. He previously served as the chief executive officer of German media company RTL Group and a member of the executive board of its parent company Bertelsmann.

== Early life ==
Zeiler was born in Ottakring, Vienna, to Hans and Dorothea Zeiler, a family of social democrats. He is the first born of identical twins.

His early education took place in his native Vienna, after which he studied psychology, sociology and educational science at the University of Vienna, without completing a degree.

== Career history ==
=== Summary ===
Zeiler has worked in television for 23 years—eight in the public service broadcasting sector; the remainder in commercial television.

His former employer, RTL Group, operates 40 TV channels in 10 countries, and owns FremantleMedia, a content and production company that operates in 25 countries and exports its programming to over 150 countries.

=== Early years ===
Zeiler began his early career in 1976 working as a scientific assistant at the Austrian Institute for Vocational Training Research. After three years at the institute, his career took a change of direction when he began working as a freelance journalist. In 1979 he was appointed press secretary and spokesperson for the Austrian minister for education and the arts, Dr Fred Sinowatz. He followed Dr Sinowatz to the federal chancellor's office in 1983, going on to work for a few months for federal chancellor Dr Franz Vranitzky.

=== Television ===
In 1986, Zeiler became secretary general of the Austrian Broadcasting Corporation (ORF) in Vienna. Despite being only 24, Zeiler had already realised that "television is part of my life".

In 1991, he moved to Munich when he was appointed CEO of German commercial TV channel, Tele 5. In 1992 he became CEO of RTL II. Two years later, in 1994, Zeiler returned to Vienna when he was appointed CEO of ORF.

=== RTL Group ===
In November 1998, Zeiler joined RTL Group, being appointed CEO of RTL Television in Cologne. He succeeded Helmut Thoma. The role gave him responsibility for the German television channels RTL Television, Vox, RTL II, Super RTL, and N-TV.

In March 2003 Zeiler became CEO of RTL Group. In 2005, he passed the management of RTL Television to Anke Schäferkordt, so that he could focus solely on the company's international entertainment network.

Zeiler has been a member of the executive board of Bertelsmann AG since October 2005. He is also a member of the supervisory boards of Groupe M6 in France and RTL Television in Germany, and vice chairman of the board of the Greek Alpha Media Group.

In August 2010, Zeiler's contract was renewed until the end of 2015. On April 18, 2012, Zeiler left RTL "by mutual and amicable agreement" and "at his own request" to take over the international business at Turner Broadcasting System.

=== Warner Bros. Discovery ===
In April 2012, Zeiler became president of the Turner Broadcasting System International group, WarnerMedia's TV subsidiary, which also operates channels such as Turner Network Television (TNT), Cartoon Network and CNN. Zeiler's new activities include responsibility for all entertainment and children's channels and associated media services outside North America, as well as the distribution and commercial activities of CNN International. This is 130 channels in more than 200 countries with 3800 employees and $2 billion in revenue. In March 2019, WarnerMedia's new CEO, John Stankey, also put him in charge of the company's entire advertising business. The latter's successor, Jason Kilar, made Zeiler head of WarnerMedia's reorganized international division. Zeiler is responsible for WarnerMedia's entire international business, as well as program production for all stations, including the new streaming service HBO Max, on an international level. After Paramount's takeover of Warner in late 2026, Zeiler left Skydance.

=== Other activities ===
From 2002 to 2004, Zeiler was a member of the Board of Trustees of the Bertelsmann Stiftung, which holds a majority in Bertelsmann.

Zeiler is a member of the Steering Committee of the Bilderberg Group, a private, annual gathering of intellectual figures, political leaders, and business executives.

In 2016, Zeiler was one of the candidates for SPOe chairperson. Ten years later, in September 2026, Zeiler announced via the Austrian tabloid Kronen Zeitung a second shot at becoming chairman of the SPOe. In October 2026, the Austrian Greens publicized a past engagement of Zeiler's at Vonovia, meanwhile Europe’s largest publicly traded landlord.

== Views ==
Zeiler is often outspoken in his views on the value of television as a medium, despite often challenging evidence to the contrary. In a 2010 interview with Dutch newspaper, NRC Handelsblad, Zeiler commented on the recovery of the television advertising market in 2010. "In Western Europe, our channels are now performing at the same level as in 2008… Other media, such as the publishing sector, have not bounced back anything like as strongly".

He is convinced that advertisers believe in the effectiveness of television – "TV is bigger than ever" – and believes "Television will remain the mass medium – the only medium capable of assembling truly mass audiences".

Zeiler has long been a strong supporter of British television. Speaking at the 2009 worldview address in Edinburgh, he said European television makers had a huge amount to learn from the UK.

He is one of the few non-British recipients of the Royal Television Society (RTS) fellowship, and was chair of the 2008 RTS international conference 'Opportunity Knocks'.

He believes "Britain is an incredible centre for talent, creativity and ideas", and that even the US networks look to the UK for inspiration. He went on to say, "British production companies are the absolute best in the world when it comes to non-scripted, non-fiction formats".

Zeiler has also been outspoken in his support of calls to relax UK product placement rules, to help struggling commercial broadcasters. He believes, "Product placement is a commercial fact of life… Carefully regulated product placement is a legitimate revenue stream and the money raised could be used to support the production of original content – content viewers want to watch".

Summarising his objective for RTL for the future, Zeiler commented: "We are developing our broadcasting operations into digital TV families with a presence on all new platforms. We will systematically meet the rising demand for attractive content and expand our production arm, FremantleMedia, with new talent, new formats and by doing business in new markets".

== Recognition ==
In 2004, Zeiler was voted media personality of the year at the Mipcom audiovisual content trade show in Cannes. The award came at a time when RTL Group continued to set new records, despite the crisis evident in the media sector.

In January 2011, Zeiler became the first non-American to receive NATPE's Brandon Tartikoff legacy award. Named after arguably one of television's greatest programmers, the award was created to recognise television professionals who exhibit extraordinary passion, leadership, independence and vision in the process of creating television programming.

Zeiler shares the eighth annual award with Dick Ebersol, Mary Hart and Regis Philbin.

Commenting on the award, Rick Feldman, NATPE president and CEO, said, "We believe that Dick, Mary, Regis and Gerhard have remarkably shaped the global television industry on both business and pop cultural levels, and truly embody the spirit of the Brandon Tartikoff Legacy Award".
