= Luis Silberwasser =

Colombian-American media executive

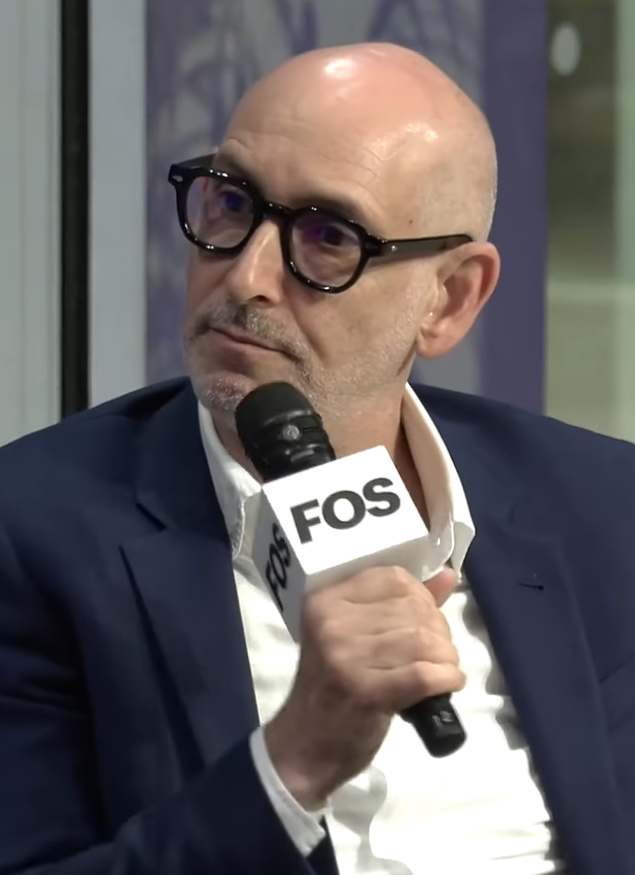
- Silberwasser in 2025
- Education: Harvard Business School
- Occupation: Media executive
- Known for: Chairman and CEO of TNT Sports

Luis Silberwasser is a Colombian-American media executive who is currently chairman and CEO of TNT Sports. He previously served as president of Telemundo Networks from 2014 to 2018. Prior to joining Telemundo, Silberwasser served as executive vice president and chief content officer for Discovery Networks International.

== Early life and education ==
Luis Silberwasser was born in New York City on October 21, 1964, to Jaime Silberwasser and Fanny Bacal. His family moved to Cali, Colombia when he was five years old. Luis returned to study in the U.S. in 1981. He graduated from Georgia Institute of Technology in 1986 where he completed a degree in industrial engineering. He later attended Harvard Business School where he earned an MBA in 1991.

== Career ==
Silberwasser started his role as president of Telemundo Networks, in August 2014 and oversees the development and execution of the entertainment content strategy. He is often quoted and cited in articles and interviews related to Telemundo's content and programming.

Before joining Telemundo, Silberwasser was executive vice president and chief content officer for Discovery International based in London. He oversaw the DNI's production and development unit, developing global content for Discovery's portfolio of international networks in 225 countries and territories worldwide. Silberwasser also held leadership positions in marketing, sales and business development within the division. He led new business opportunities as senior vice president for strategic planning, including the division's entry into the Lifestyle category and the U.S. Hispanic market.

Silberwasser has also served as senior vice president, Content Group, for Discovery Networks Latin America/US Hispanic, managing programming, production and marketing for the region's 15 channels, including the flagship Discovery Channel.

Before joining Discovery in 1998, Silberwasser was vice president and general manager of the Personal Care and Comfort division of Sunbeam Corporation in Delray Beach, Florida. He also served as Brand Manager in the Beauty Care division at Procter & Gamble.

In January 2021, he joined Univision as president of the Univision Television Networks Group. In June 2022, it was announced that Silberwasser would return to Discovery, this time as chairman of sports for Warner Bros. Discovery; he will oversee the U.S. Turner Sports division, as well as international operations such as Eurosport.

=== Organizations ===
Silberwasser has been a board director of the National Association of Television Program Executives (NATPE), since 2015

=== Awards ===
- CableFax Most Influential Minorities (2017)
- CableFax 100 (2015–17)
- B&C and Multichannel News Power 100 Media Executives (2015)
- NAMIC Leadership Luminary Award (2006)
