= The Runner (TV series) =

2016 American TV series

- Logo used for the first season.
- Genre: Reality competition
- Presented by: Matthew Patrick; Kaj Larsen
- Country of origin: United States
- Original language: English
- No. of seasons: 1
- No. of episodes: 30

Production
- Executive producers: Matt Damon; Ben Affleck; Craig Piligian; Mike Nichols
- Running time: 26–118 minutes
- Production companies: go90; Adaptative Studios; Pilgrim Media Group; Pearl Street Films

Original release
- Network: go90
- Release: July 1 – July 31, 2016

The Runner is a reality series on the streaming service go90. The show has five "Chaser Teams" of two people each chasing down the runner around the United States of America in 30 days. The viewers have the opportunity to also win money by answering questions and/or befriending chasers. Every second the prize money goes up starting at $15,000 on July 1, 2016 and ending with $500,000 on July 30, 2016. The Runner and Chase Teams start off in Richmond, Virginia.

The Runner could be watched live during the month of July 2016 at certain times in the United States. In the situation where the runner is caught, the team who caught them gets the current bounty and a new runner starts where the last one left off. The show is co-hosted by Matthew Patrick (MatPat) and Kaj Larsen. The show went through many years of development, picked up and dropped by ABC in 2002 and later, picked up and dropped by Verizon in 2016.

== History ==
Matt Damon and Ben Affleck first sold The Runner to ABC in 2000. The series was slated for a midseason launch during the 2001-2002 season but was halted in the aftermath of 9/11 when security concerns compounded the already big challenges of the complex and expensive production. A later attempt was considered in 2006 for Yahoo! by producer Mark Burnett, but never came to fruition due to technology issues. The show was redeveloped by Pilgrim Media Group for go90 in 2016.

== Overview ==
The Runner is a reality television competition, which consists of teams of five ("Chaser Teams") attempting to catch a runner, whose goal is to race across the USA. The race is divided into daily segments, which end when the Runner gets to the Safe Zone or is caught. If the Runner is caught, the Chase Team who caught the Runner is awarded the Runner's bounty, which starts at $15,000 and increases by $15,000 every day. If the Runner makes it to the end without getting caught, the Runner is awarded $500,000. The viewers are also eligible to win money. Every day, the Chase Teams and runner give out a cash prize in "Chaser" or "Runner Cash" to whomever they deem worthy of it.

"America's Cash Task" are clues that are given twice daily that point in the direction of the Runner. Viewers can submit the answer online, and 10 people are drawn for each ACT to win a cash prize.

=== Competition structure ===
There are 3 episodes aired live every day for a month, at 12pm, 3pm, and 10pm EDT. The 12pm episode begins with co-host Kaj Larsen giving the Chaser Teams a task, which usually provides a clue which needs the ACT 1 answer to be completed. The first ACT normally gives a city name or general location, which the Chaser Teams then begin driving to. The Runner is simultaneously provided his "Daily Op", which he must complete in order to escape for the day.

The second ACT clue is released to the Chaser Teams when they are within a certain radius of the Runner, or during the 3pm episode, whichever one comes first. The clue, when deciphered, contains the exact location of the Runner's Daily Op.

The Runner's Daily Op consists of a challenge, which when completed awards a Checkpoint Key. Every 5 days, the Runner must perform a "Daily Op on steroids", where they must use the past Checkpoint Keys to unlock a Finale Key, to be used on the final day. After every Op, the Runner is given instructions to an escape vehicle, and once they enter a certain area, they are deemed safe for the day.

=== Season One ===
The first season consisted of five original Chase Teams, followed by the addition of #RunnerAllstars midway through the season. The Chase Teams are:

- #TheBrogrammers, consisting of James Stern and Alex Dadds.
- #BrotherNature, consisting of Travis Smith and Koa Smith.
- #SweetNSavage, consisting of Ashley Kelsey of MTV's The Real World: San Diego (2011) and The Challenge: Battle of the Seasons, and Heather Rae El Moussa.
- #FriendZone, consisting of Rafael Melo and Jen Brill.
- #BravoSquare, consisting of Brandon Saunders and Brent Saunders, brothers.
- #RunnerAllstars, consisting of the first two Runners, Bri Hill and Steve Young, introduced mid-season after they were caught.

=== Second season (canceled) ===
Season Two was confirmed by MatPat on July 30, 2016 at the end of the final episode of Season One. go90 was expected to continue to host the show.

On July 31, 2018, go90 shut down its operations, leaving the show's future in doubt.
