= Vessel (website) =

Defunct video streaming service

Vessel Group, Inc.
- Industry: Online video
- Founded: January 21, 2015; 11 years ago
- Defunct: October 31, 2016
- Fate: Acquired by Verizon
- Key people: Jason Kilar; Richard Tom

Vessel was a commercial video service launched in early 2015 by former Hulu executives Jason Kilar and Richard Tom. Vessel was acquired by Verizon on October 26, 2016 and was closed on October 31, 2016.

== History ==
The service resembled YouTube, whereby a viewer could watch videos for free. However, viewers could add "Early Access" at a $3 monthly or $20 annual fee to their account, which allowed them to view videos a minimum of 72 hours before the video is released to the general public. Vessel then created mobile applications for iOS and Android devices which optimized the videos for mobile viewing. The idea behind the site was that creators would be able to gain more revenue from their videos than on YouTube due to the subscription fee as well as advertisements.

After the site was created, YouTube personalities such as LinusTechTips, Craig Benzine, Connor Franta, Shane Dawson, Doug Walker, Caspar Lee, Tanya Burr, Good Mythical Morning, Epic Meal Time, Element animation, Marcus Butler, Kent Heckel, LaToya Forever, Delaila Johnson, Tre Melvin and Jack Vale signed up to have their content streamed on Vessel.

On October 26, 2016, Verizon Communications announced that it had acquired Vessel, and that it would be shut down on October 31. Vessel's team was hired to revamp Verizon's fledgling video streaming service go90 (resulting in 155 members of the service's existing staff being laid off), with Richard Tom retained and appointed as chief technology officer of Verizon Digital Entertainment. Kilar departed after the sale.

== See also ==
- Alternative media
- List of Internet phenomena
- List of video hosting services
- YouTube Premium
- YouTube
