= J. Richard Munro =

American media executive (1931–2024)

- Born: January 26, 1931; Syracuse, New York, U.S.
- Died: August 11, 2024 (aged 93); Naples, Florida, U.S.

J. Richard Munro (January 26, 1931 – August 11, 2024) was an American media executive.

== Career ==
He served in the United States Marines in the Korean War. He graduated from Colgate University.

As a vice-president at Time Inc., he was involved in the launch of HBO. From 1980 to 1986, he was president of Time Inc.

In 1989, he was instrumental in the merger between Time Inc. and Warner Communications Inc. He was co-founder and co-chairman of Time-Warner, with Steven J. Ross. He retired in 1990.

From 1984 to 1994, he was a trustee of RAND Corporation.
