= WarnerMedia =

American media conglomerate (1972–2022)

Warner Media, LLC.
- Final logo created by Wolff Olins and used from 2019 to 2022

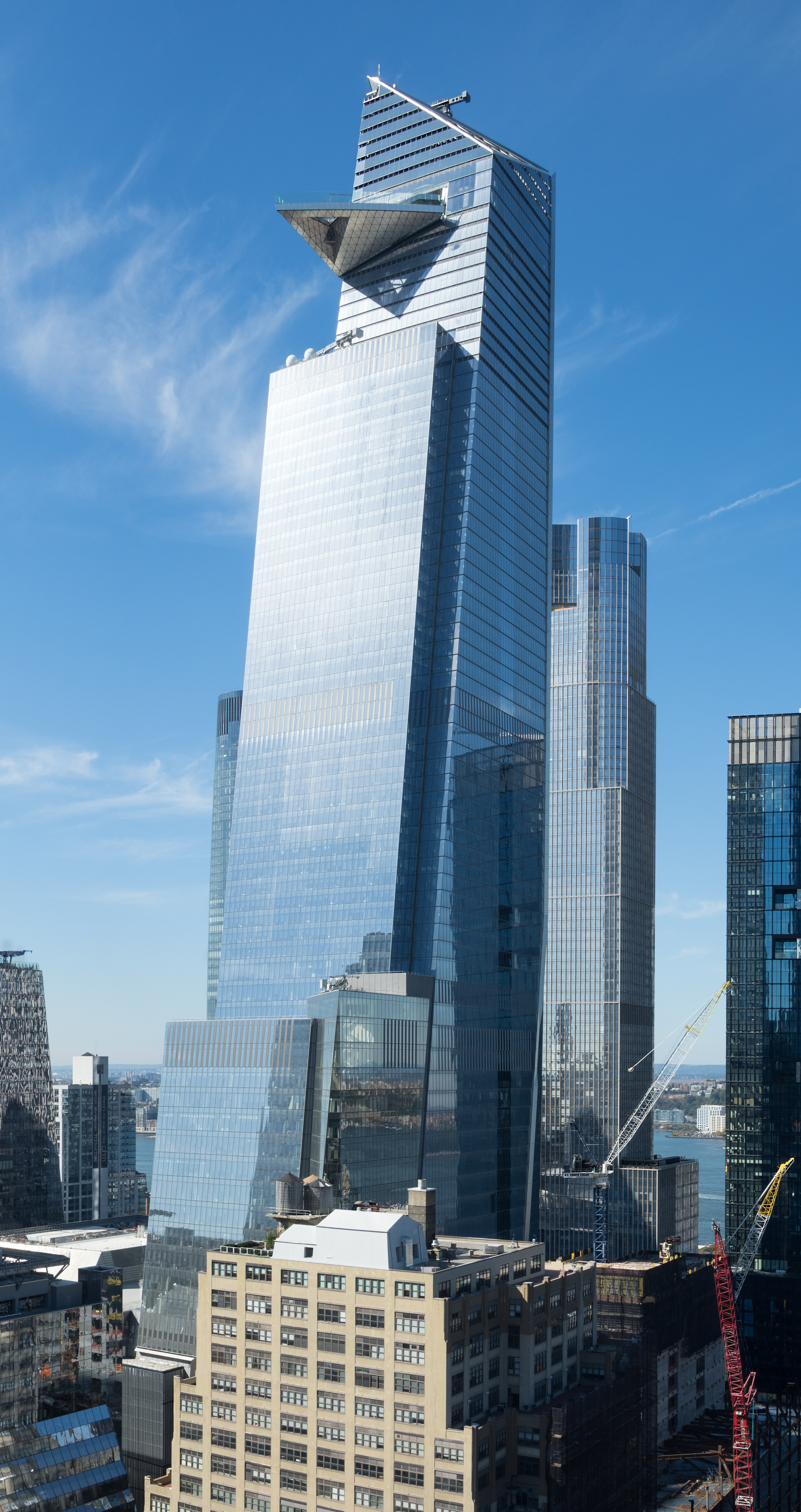
- 30 Hudson Yards, WarnerMedia's final headquarters
- Trade name: WarnerMedia
- Formerly: Warner Communications Inc. (1972–1990); Time Warner Inc. (1990–2001; 2003–2018); Time Warner Entertainment Company, L.P. (1992–2001); AOL Time Warner Inc. (2001–2003)
- Type: Public (1972–2018); Subsidiary (2018–2022)
- Traded as: NYSE: WCI (1972–1990); NYSE: TWX (1990–2001; 2003–2018); NYSE: AOL (2001–2003); S&P 100 component (until 2018); S&P 500 component (until 2018)
- Industry: Mass media; Entertainment
- Predecessors: Kinney National Company (1961–1972); Time Inc. (1922–2018); America Online; Turner Broadcasting System
- Founded: February 10, 1972; 54 years ago (as Warner Communications); January 10, 1990; 36 years ago (as Time Warner); June 30, 1992; 34 years ago (merged entertainment operations to form Time Warner Entertainment Company L.P.); January 11, 2001; 25 years ago (Merged to form AOL Time Warner); June 15, 2018; 8 years ago (as WarnerMedia)
- Founder: Steve Ross (WCI); Richard Munro (Time)
- Defunct: April 8, 2022; 4 years ago
- Fate: Spun off from AT&T and merged with Discovery, Inc.
- Successor: Warner Bros. Discovery
- Headquarters: 30 Hudson Yards, New York City, United States
- Area served: Worldwide
- Revenue: ▲US$35.63 billion (2021)
- Operating income: ▼US$1.9 billion (2021)
- Number of employees: 30,000 (2021)
- Parent: AT&T (2018–2022)
- Divisions: WarnerMedia Studios & Networks; WarnerMedia News & Sports; WarnerMedia Sales & Distribution; WarnerMedia Direct; WarnerMedia International
- Website: warnermedia.com; timewarner.com; aoltimewarner.com (archived websites)

Warner Media, LLC. was an American multinational entertainment and media conglomerate headquartered at 30 Hudson Yards in Manhattan, New York City. After being acquired by AT&T in June 2018, WarnerMedia was reorganized as a privately-owned subsidiary.

The corporate predecessors to WarnerMedia are Time Inc. and Warner Communications Inc. (WCI) By the late 1960s, both companies began repositioning themselves as major players in cable television and mass media through multiple acquisitions. In 1990, both companies merged to form Time Warner, which was the world's largest media conglomerate for 18 years. Time Warner expanded by forming Time Warner Cable in 1992 and acquiring Turner Broadcasting System in 1996. Its 2001 merger with AOL, which formed AOL Time Warner, became one of the worst business deals in corporate history, which led the company to revert its name to Time Warner in 2003.

Heavy losses from within AOL led Time Warner to pursue a years-long divestment strategy that culminated with Time Inc.'s spin-off in 2014. Despite spinning off Time Inc., the Time Warner name was kept until June 15, 2018, when AT&T completed its $108.7 billion acquisition of the company and renamed it to WarnerMedia. Under AT&T, a centralized approach was adopted, with the company's subsidiaries being consolidated into five divisions and HBO Max being launched in 2020, as the company's primary streaming service. These moves were intended to synergize WarnerMedia's content libraries with AT&T's wireless distribution, to reposition the telecom giant as a diversified entertainment giant, but lackluster results led AT&T to reverse course.

On May 17, 2021, AT&T announced its spin-off of WarnerMedia through a Reverse Morris Trust, and it subsequently merged with Discovery, Inc. to form Warner Bros. Discovery (WBD) in April 2022. After the merger closed, WarnerMedia became an inactive shell corporation. In 2018, the company was ranked number 130 on the Fortune 500 list. Throughout its nearly 32-year run as a company, WarnerMedia owned a variety of large media companies (including AOL, Time Inc., TW Telecom, Time Warner Cable, AOL Time Warner Book Group, Six Flags, and Warner Music Group). These companies were either sold or spun off as independent companies.

Warner Communications and Time Warner's founder, Steve Ross, died on December 20, 1992, at the age of 65, due to complications of prostate cancer, from which he suffered in his final years. Time Warner's co-founder, Richard Munro, later died on May 9, 2024, at the age of 93.

== History ==
=== Kinney National and Warner Communications (1969–1990) ===
The "Big W" logo was designed by Saul Bass and is currently used by Warner Music Group

WCI's history stems back to Kinney National Services, which purchased the Warner Bros.-Seven Arts film studio in 1969, and later reincorporated as Warner Communications Inc. (WCI) in 1972 after divesting non-core businesses. Kinney National (renamed to Kinney Services) originally began as a service-based conglomerate, but after purchasing several entertainment businesses during the late 1960s, Kinney soon pivoted away from the service industry. By mid-1971, Kinney separated its non-media businesses into National Kinney Corporation.

At its reincorporation, Warner Communications was the parent company for Warner Bros, National Periodical Publications (predecessor to DC Comics), Warner Cable (later Time Warner Cable), and Kinney Record Group International (renamed Warner-Elektra-Atlantic). Warner's longest-serving executive was Steven Ross. By 1984, Steven Ross was the sole Chairman, Chief Executive, and President of Warner Communications. The company made investments into the Sports Industry through Global Soccer Inc. and formed a joint venture with American Express known as Warner-Amex Satellite Entertainment. Warner-Amex would launch several cable channels, including MTV, Nickelodeon, and VH1. In May 1986, this venture was sold to the original Viacom. A noteworthy acquisition done by Warner Communications was its purchase of Atari Inc. in 1976. For several years, Warner enjoyed success with the gaming company until the sudden Video Game Crash of 1983. Suffering extensive losses, Warner divested parts of Atari along with several other companies it owned, and by the mid-1980s, WCI had rebounded in its financial performance.

Warner Communications' headquarters were at 75 Rockefeller Plaza in New York City. It had 26,300 employees in 1985, and operating income of US$7.965 billion in 1986. Its main divisions were:

- Warner Bros., Inc.
- Warner-Elektra-Atlantic
- Warner Cable
- Warner Books
- Lorimar-Telepictures
- Atari Games Inc.

=== Time Warner (1990–2001) ===
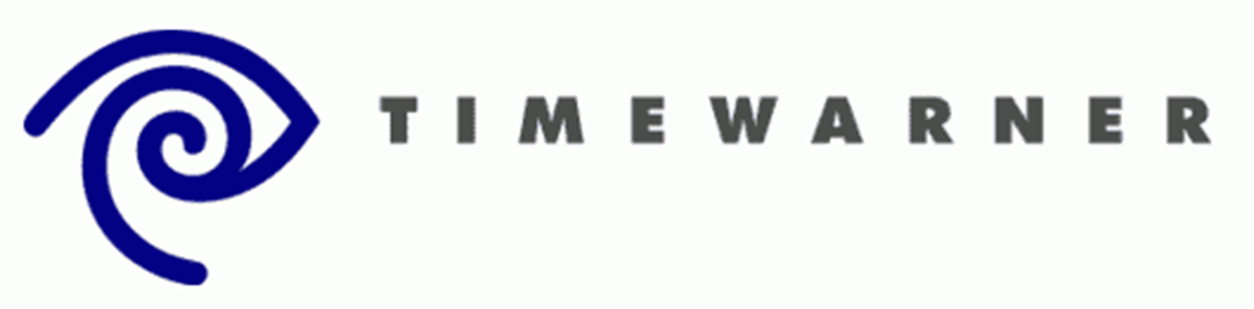
First Time Warner logo (1990–1993)

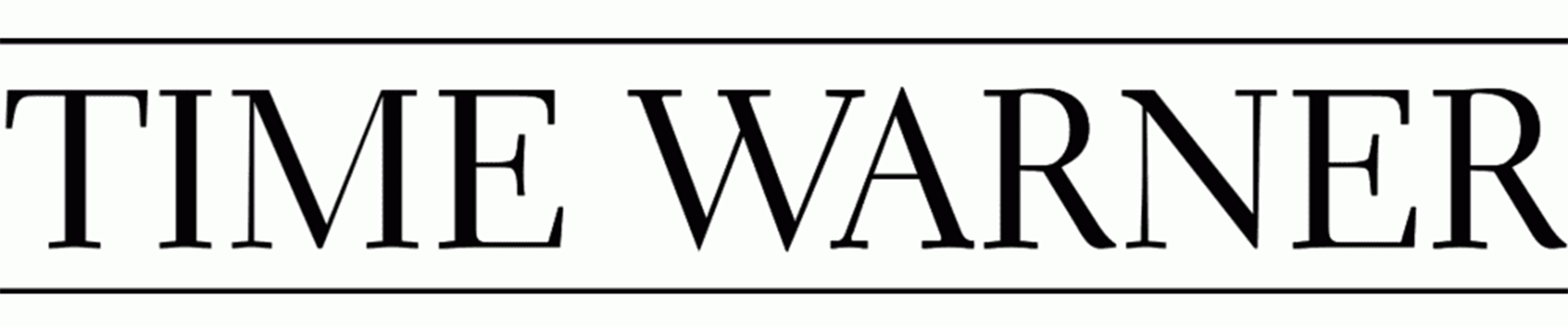
Second Time Warner logo (1993–2001)

After several rounds of merger discussions, Time Inc. announced on March 4, 1989, that the two companies were to merge. If Warner and Time were to be successful in their merger, it would result in the world's largest media company. In response, Paramount Communications launched a counterbid of $12.2 billion to acquire Time Inc. in a stock-swap deal to block the merger. Time rejected Paramount's offer and requested a bigger bid of $14.9 billion. In response, Paramount filed a lawsuit in a Delaware Court to block the Time/Warner merger. The courts ruled in Time's favor twice, leading Paramount to end both its Time Inc. bids and the lawsuit and allowing the Time Warner merger to proceed on January 10, 1990.

Legally, the merger was structured as an acquisition of Warner Communications Inc. by Time Inc., with the latter changing its name to Time Warner Inc. The lawsuit by Paramount caused the mechanism of the merger to be changed such that Time Inc. had to take on significant debt to outright purchase all Warner Communications Inc.'s outstanding shares, which would not have been necessary in the original merger mechanism.

==== Time Warner Entertainment (1992–2001) ====
On June 30, 1992, Time Warner transferred most of its film, television production, music and cable businesses, including the Warner Bros., HBO, and Time Warner Cable assets, into Time Warner Entertainment Company, L.P. (TWEC), a new limited partnership with Toshiba and C. Itoh & Co. where each invested US$500 million for a 6.25% share. The deal announced in October 1991 was intended to relieve debt pressure from the Time Inc.–Warner Communications merger.

In 1993, US West joined the partnership with a US$2.5 billion investment for a 25% share. As part of the partnership, US West formed Time Warner Communications (also utilized as the brand name for cable operation previously under the ATC name), in order to bring telephone via fiber to the masses. By 1996, TWEC was owned 74.49% by Time Warner and the remainder by US West.

US West's stake eventually passed to acquired cable company MediaOne, then to AT&T Broadband in 1999 when that company acquired MediaOne, then finally to Comcast in 2001 when that company bought the AT&T Broadband division. Comcast sold their stake in the company in 2003, relegating the name to a subdivision under Time Warner Cable.

==== Other operations ====
In 1991, HBO and Cinemax became the first premium pay services to offer multiplexing to cable customers, with companion channels supplementing the main networks. In 1993, HBO became the world's first digitally transmitted television service. In 1995, CNN introduced CNN.com which later became a leading destination for global digital news, both online and mobile. In 1996, Warner Bros. spearheaded the introduction of the DVD, which gradually replaced VHS tapes as the standard format for home video in the late 1990s and early to mid-2000s. In 1999, HBO became the first national cable television network to broadcast a high–definition version of its channel.

Time Warner Entertainment completed its purchase of Six Flags Theme Parks in 1993 after buying half of the company in 1991, saving it from financial trouble. The company was later sold to Oklahoma-based theme park operator Premier Parks under certain terms and conditions on April 1, 1998. Dick Parsons, already a director on the board since 1991, was hired as Time Warner president in 1995, although the division operational heads continued to report directly to chairman and CEO Gerald Levin.

==== Turner Broadcasting System acquisition ====
On October 10, 1996, Time Warner acquired Turner Broadcasting System, which was established by Ted Turner in 1965. The deal resulted in the company gaining a multitude of cable channels, as well as two separate film companies, New Line Cinema and Castle Rock Entertainment. Time Warner was labelled as the world's largest media company following the acquisition of Turner Broadcasting System.

The deal also allowed Warner Bros. to regain the rights to their pre-1950 film library, which by then had been owned by Turner (the films are still technically held by Turner, but Warner Bros. is responsible for sales and distribution), while Turner gained access to Warner Bros.' post-1950 library, as well as other Warner Bros.-owned properties. The Turner deal also gave Time Warner access to Metro-Goldwyn-Mayer (MGM)'s pre-May 1986 library and the pre-1991 libraries of animation studios Hanna-Barbera and Ruby-Spears.

The deal was legally structured such that a new Time Warner Inc. corporate entity was formed that contained the "old" Time Warner Inc., which was renamed to Time Warner Companies, Inc.; as well as Turner Broadcasting System, Inc.

=== AOL Time Warner (2001–2003) ===
==== Formation ====
AOL Time Warner logo (2001–2003)

In January 2000, America Online (AOL) stated its intentions to purchase Time Warner for $183 billion. Due to the larger market capitalization of AOL, their shareholders would own 55% of the new company while Time Warner shareholders owned only 45%, so in actual practice AOL had merged with Time Warner, even though Time Warner had far more assets and revenues. Time Warner had been looking for a way to embrace the digital revolution, while AOL wanted to anchor its stock price with more tangible assets.

The deal, officially filed on February 11, 2000, employed a merger structure in which each original company merged into a newly created entity. The Federal Trade Commission (FTC) cleared the deal on December 14, 2000, and gave final approval on January 11, 2001; the company completed the merger later that day. The deal was approved on the same day by the Federal Communications Commission (FCC), and had already been cleared by the European Commission (EC) on October 11, 2000.

AOL Time Warner was supposed to be a merger of equals with top executives from both sides. Gerald Levin, who had been chairman and CEO of Time Warner Entertainment, was CEO of the new company. AOL co-founder Steve Case was executive chairman of the board of directors, Robert W. Pittman (president and COO of AOL) and Dick Parsons (president of Time Warner) was co-chief operating officers, and J. Michael Kelly (the CFO from AOL) became the chief financial officer.

According to AOL president and COO Bob Pittman, the slow-moving Time Warner Entertainment would now take off at Internet speed, accelerated by AOL: "All you need to do is put a catalyst to [Time Warner Entertainment], and in a short period, you can alter the growth rate. The growth rate will be like an Internet company." The vision for Time Warner's future seemed clear and straightforward; by tapping into AOL, Time Warner would reach deep into the homes of tens of millions of new customers. AOL would use Time Warner's high-speed cable lines to deliver to its subscribers Time Warner's branded magazines, books, music, and movies. This would have created 130 million subscription relationships.

==== Operations ====
However, the growth and profitability of the AOL division stalled due to advertising and loss of market share to the growth of high-speed broadband providers. The value of the AOL division dropped significantly, not unlike the market valuation of similar independent internet companies that drastically fell, and forced a goodwill write-off, causing AOL Time Warner to report a loss of $99 billion in 2002 — at the time, the largest loss ever reported by a company. The total value of AOL stock subsequently went from $226 billion to about $20 billion.

An outburst by Vice-Chairman Ted Turner at a board meeting prompted Steve Case to contact each of the directors and push for CEO Gerald Levin's ouster. Although Case's coup attempt was rebuffed by Parsons and several other directors, Levin became frustrated with being unable to "regain the rhythm" at the combined company and handed in his resignation in the fall of 2001, effective in May 2002. Although Co-COO Bob Pittman was the strongest supporter of Levin and largely seen as the heir-apparent, Dick Parsons was instead chosen as CEO. Time Warner Entertainment CFO J. Michael Kelly was demoted to COO of the AOL division and replaced as CFO by Wayne Pace. AOL chairman and CEO Barry Schuler was removed from his position and placed in charge of a new "content creation division", being replaced on an interim basis by Pittman, who was already serving as the sole COO after Parsons' promotion.

Many of the expected synergies between AOL and other Time Warner divisions never materialized, as most Time Warner divisions were considered independent fiefs that rarely cooperated prior to the merger. A new incentive program that granted options based on the performance of AOL Time Warner, replacing the cash bonuses for the results of their own division, caused resentment among Time Warner division heads who blamed the AOL division for failing to meet expectations and dragging down the combined company. AOL Time Warner COO Pittman, who expected to have the divisions working closely towards convergence instead found heavy resistance from many division executives, who also criticized Pittman for adhering to optimistic growth targets for AOL Time Warner that were never met. Some of the attacks on Pittman were reported to come from the print media in the Time, Inc. division under Don Logan. Furthermore, CEO Parsons' democratic style prevented Pittman from exercising authority over the "old-guard" division heads who resisted Pittman's synergy initiatives.

Pittman resigned as AOL Time Warner COO after July 4, 2002, being reportedly burned out by the AOL special assignment and almost hospitalized, unhappy about the criticism from Time Warner executives, and seeing nowhere to move up in firm as Parsons was firmly entrenched as CEO. Pittman's departure was seen as a great victory to Time Warner executives who wanted to undo the merger. In a sign of AOL's diminishing importance to the media conglomerate, Pittman's responsibilities were divided between two Time Warner veterans; Jeffrey Bewkes who was CEO of Home Box Office, and Don Logan who had been CEO of Time. Logan became chairman of the newly created media and communications group, overseeing America Online, Time, Time Warner Cable, the AOL Time Warner Book Group, and the Interactive Video unit, relegating AOL to being just another division in the conglomerate. Bewkes became chairman of the entertainment and networks group, comprising HBO, Cinemax, New Line Cinema, The WB, TNT, Turner Networks, Warner Bros., and Warner Music Group. Both Logan and Bewkes, who had initially opposed the merger, were chosen because they were considered the most successful operational executives in the conglomerate and they would report to AOL Time Warner CEO Richard Parsons. Logan, generally admired at Time Warner and reviled by AOL for being a corporate timeserver who stressed incremental steady growth and not much of a risk-taker, moved to purge AOL of Pittman allies.

AOL Time Warner chairman Steve Case took on added prominence as the co-head of a new strategy committee of the board, making speeches to divisions on synergism and the promise of the Internet. However, under pressure from institutional investor vice-president Gordon Crawford who lined up dissenters, Case stated in January 2003 that he would not stand for re-election as executive chairman in the upcoming annual meeting, making CEO Richard Parsons the chairman-elect.

In March 2003, AOL Time Warner regained full control of the film and television production assets from the Time Warner Entertainment Company, L.P. (TWEC) partnership. The Warner Bros. assets then were placed into the newly formed Warner Bros. Entertainment Inc. wholly-owned subsidiary, which had been formed on December 3, 2002. TWEC retained only Time Warner Cable.

=== Time Warner (2003–2018) ===
Time Warner logo (2003–2018)

In June 2003, the company dropped the "AOL" from its name, and reverted itself to Time Warner, (Note: The logo is stylized as "TimeWarner" (in camel case).) with its ticker on the New York Stock Exchange also being reverted to "TWX" from "AOL". The company also spun off Time-Life's ownership under the legal name Direct Holdings Americas, Inc. Case resigned from the Time Warner board on October 31, 2005. Jeff Bewkes, who eventually became CEO of Time Warner in 2008, described the 2001 merger with AOL as 'the biggest mistake in corporate history' in 2010.

==== Divestments ====
In November 2003, Time Warner announced they would sell Warner Music Group, which hosted a variety of acts such as Madonna and Prince, to an investor group led by Edgar Bronfman Jr. and Thomas H. Lee Partners, in order to cut its debt down to US $20 billion. Time Warner then sold its books group to Lagardère in 2006.

On December 27, 2007, newly installed Time Warner CEO Jeffrey Bewkes discussed possible plans to spin off Time Warner Cable and sell off AOL and Time Inc. This would leave a smaller company made up of Turner Broadcasting, Warner Bros. and HBO. In 2009, Time Warner spun out its Time Warner Cable division (which is now part of Charter Communications), and later AOL, as independent companies; AOL was later purchased by Verizon in 2015.

On March 6, 2013, Time Warner intended to spin off its publishing division Time Inc. as a separate, publicly traded company. The transaction was completed on June 6, 2014.

==== Other operations ====
In 2005, Time Warner was among 53 entities that contributed the maximum of $250,000 to the second inauguration of President George W. Bush.

On February 28, 2008, co-chairmen and co-CEOs of New Line Cinema Bob Shaye and Michael Lynne resigned from the 40-year-old movie studio in response to Jeffrey Bewkes' demand for cost-cutting measures at the studio, which he intended to dissolve into the Warner Bros. Entertainment subsidiary.

In the first quarter of 2010, Time Warner purchased additional interests in HBO Latin America Group for $217 million, which resulted in HBO owning 80% of the equity interests of HBO LAG. In 2010, HBO purchased the remainder of its partners' interests in HBO Europe (formerly HBO Central Europe) for $136 million, net of cash acquired. In August 2010, Time Warner agreed to acquire Shed Media, a television production company, for £100 million. Its distribution operation, Outright Distribution, was folded into Warner Bros. International Television Production. On August 26, 2010, Turner acquired Chilevisión. Turner already operated in the country with CNN Chile.

In May 2011, Warner Bros. Home Entertainment Group acquired Flixster, a movie discovery application company. The acquisition also includes Rotten Tomatoes, a movie review aggregator.

In June 2012, Time Warner (through Warner Bros. Television) acquired Alloy Entertainment, a publisher and television studio whose works are aimed at teen girls and young women. On August 6, 2012, Time Warner acquired Bleacher Report, a sports news website. The property was placed under the control of the Turner Sports division.

In January 2014, Time Warner, Related Companies, and Oxford Properties Group announced that the then Time Warner intended to relocate the company's corporate headquarters and its New York City-based employees to 30 Hudson Yards in the Hudson Yards neighborhood in Chelsea, Manhattan, and has accordingly made an initial financial commitment. Time Warner sold its stake in the Columbus Circle building for $1.3 billion to Related and two wealth funds. The move would be completed in 2019.

In June 2014, Rupert Murdoch made a bid for Time Warner at $85 per share in stock and cash ($80 billion total) which Time Warner's board of directors turned down in July. Time Warner's CNN unit would have been sold to ease antitrust issues of the purchase. On August 5, 2014, Murdoch withdrew his offer to purchase Time Warner.

=== Acquisition by AT&T ===
On October 20, 2016, it was reported that AT&T was in talks to acquire Time Warner. The proposed deal would give AT&T significant holdings in the media industry. AT&T's competitor Comcast had previously acquired NBCUniversal in a similar bid to increase its media holdings, in concert with its ownership of television and internet providers. On October 22, 2016, AT&T reached a deal to buy Time Warner for $85.4 billion. The merger would bring Time Warner's properties under the same umbrella as AT&T's telecommunication holdings, including satellite provider DirecTV. The deal faced criticism for the possibility that AT&T could use Time Warner content as leverage to discriminate against or limit access to the content by competing providers.

On February 15, 2017, Time Warner shareholders approved the merger. On February 28, Federal Communications Commission (FCC) chairman Ajit Pai refused to review the deal, leaving the review to the Department of Justice (DOJ). On March 15, 2017, the merger was approved by the European Commission (EC). On August 22, 2017, the merger was approved by the Mexican Comisión Federal de Competencia. On September 5, 2017, the merger was approved by the Chilean Fiscalía Nacional Económica.

In the wake of the U.S. presidency of Donald Trump, Time Warner's ownership of CNN was considered a potential source of scrutiny for the deal, as Trump had repeatedly criticized CNN for how it covered his administration, and stated during his campaign that he planned to block the acquisition because of the potential impact of the resulting consolidation. Following his election, however, his transition team stated that the government planned to evaluate the deal without prejudice.

On November 8, 2017, reports of a meeting between AT&T CEO Randall L. Stephenson and Makan Delrahim, assistant attorney general of the Department of Justice's Antitrust Division, indicated that AT&T had been recommended to divest DirecTV or Turner Broadcasting, seek alternative antitrust remedies, or abandon the acquisition. Some news outlets reported that AT&T had been ordered to specifically divest CNN, but these claims were denied by both Stephenson and a government official the following day, with the latter criticizing the reports as being an effort to politicize the deal. Stephenson also disputed the relevance of CNN to the antitrust concerns surrounding the acquisition, as AT&T did not already own a national news channel.

On November 20, 2017, the Department of Justice filed an antitrust lawsuit over the acquisition; Delrahim stated that the deal would "greatly harm American consumers". AT&T asserted that this suit was a "radical and inexplicable departure from decades of antitrust precedent". On December 22, 2017, the merger agreement deadline was extended to June 21, 2018, under a vote of confidence.

On June 12, 2018, district judge Richard J. Leon ruled in favor of AT&T, thus allowing the acquisition to go ahead with no conditions or remedies. Leon argued that the Department of Justice provided insufficient evidence that the proposed transaction would result in lessened competition. He also warned the government that attempting to obtain an appeal or stay on the ruling would be manifest unjust, as it would cause "certain irreparable harm to the defendants".

==== WarnerMedia (2018–2022) ====
Former logo for WarnerMedia (2018–2020)

On June 14, 2018, AT&T announced that it had closed the acquisition of Time Warner. Jeff Bewkes stepped down as CEO of Time Warner while retaining ties with the company as senior advisor of AT&T. John Stankey, who headed the AT&T/Time Warner integration team, took over as CEO. On the next day, AT&T renamed the company as WarnerMedia (legally Warner Media, LLC).

On July 12, 2018, the Department of Justice filed a notice of appeal with the D.C. Circuit to reverse the District Court's approval. Although the Department of Justice reportedly contemplated requesting an injunction to stop the deal from closing after the District Court's ruling, the department ultimately did not file the motion because WarnerMedia's operation as a separate group from the rest of AT&T would make the business relatively easy to unwind should the appeal be successful. The next day, however, AT&T CEO Randall Stephenson told CNBC that the appeal would not affect its plans to integrate WarnerMedia into AT&T, or services already launched. In a brief filed by the Justice Department, it was argued that the decision to approve the acquisition ran "contrary to fundamental economic logic and the evidence".

On August 7, 2018, AT&T acquired the remaining controlling stake in Otter Media from the Chernin Group for an undisclosed amount. The company operated as a division of WarnerMedia.

On August 29, 2018, Makan Delrahim told Recode that if the government were to win the appeal, AT&T would only sell Turner and if they lost the appeal then the February 2019 expiration of a consent decree AT&T reached with the Justice Department shortly before the deal closed would allow AT&T to do what they want with Turner. The appeal was expected to have zero impact on the integration. By September 2018, nine state attorneys general sided with AT&T on the case.

On October 10, 2018, WarnerMedia announced that it would launch an over-the-top streaming service in late 2019, featuring content from its entertainment brands. On December 14, 2018, Kevin Reilly, president of TNT and TBS, was promoted to chief content officer of all WarnerMedia digital and subscription activities, including HBO Max, reporting to both Turner's president David Levy and WarnerMedia's CEO John Stankey. The U.S. Court of Appeals in Washington D.C. unanimously upheld the lower court's ruling in favor of AT&T on February 26, 2019, stating it did not believe the merger with Time Warner would have a negative impact on either consumers or competition. The Justice Department declined to appeal the decision further, thus allowing the consent decree to expire.

On March 4, 2019, AT&T announced a major reorganization of its broadcasting assets to effectively break-up the Turner Broadcasting System. Its assets were dispersed across two new camps, WarnerMedia Entertainment and WarnerMedia News & Sports. WarnerMedia Entertainment would consist of HBO, TBS, TNT, TruTV, and the direct-to-consumer video service HBO Max. WarnerMedia News & Sports would have CNN Worldwide, Turner Sports (later known briefly as Warner Bros. Discovery Sports, and TNT Sports from 2023), and the AT&T SportsNet regional networks led by CNN president Jeff Zucker. Cartoon Network, Adult Swim, Boomerang, their respective production studios, as well as Turner Classic Movies and Otter Media would be moved directly under Warner Bros. Gerhard Zeiler moved from being president of Turner International to chief revenue officer of WarnerMedia, and would oversee the consolidated advertising and affiliation sales. David Levy and HBO chief Richard Plepler stepped down as part of the reorganization, which was described by The Wall Street Journal as being intended to end "fiefdoms". Turner Podcast Network, formed within Turner Content Distribution in 2017, became WarnerMedia Podcast Network by May 2019.

In May 2019, Kevin Reilly signed a four-year extension of his contract with the company, which additionally made him president of TruTV (alongside the other three WarnerMedia Entertainment basic cable networks), and chief content officer of direct-to-consumer for the new streaming service. On May 31, 2019, Otter Media was transferred from Warner Bros. to WarnerMedia Entertainment, and Otter's COO Andy Forssell became the executive vice president and general manager of the streaming service, while still reporting to Otter CEO Tony Goncalves — who would lead development. On July 9, 2019, it was announced that the new streaming service would be known as HBO Max, which was launched on May 27, 2020.

In September 2019, Stankey was promoted to AT&T president and chief operating officer. By April 1, 2020, former Hulu chief Jason Kilar took over as WarnerMedia CEO.

In August 2020, the company had a significant restructuring laying off around 800 employees including around 600 from Warner and 150+ from HBO. At WarnerMedia's Atlanta base, marketing and cable operations teams were particularly affected.

On August 10, 2020, WarnerMedia restructured several of its units in a major corporate revamp that resulted in TBS, TNT and TruTV being brought back under the same umbrella as Cartoon Network/Adult Swim, Boomerang and TCM, under a consolidation of WarnerMedia Entertainment and Warner Bros. Entertainment's respective assets that formed the combined WarnerMedia Studios & Networks Group unit. Casey Bloys—who has been with WarnerMedia since 2004 (as director of development at HBO Independent Productions), and was eventually elevated to President of Programming at HBO and Cinemax in May 2016—added oversight of WarnerMedia's basic cable networks and HBO Max to his purview. In October 2020, it was announced that the company was planning to execute over a 1,000 job cuts in order to reduce costs. WarnerMedia plans to reduce costs by at least 20% in order to deal with the profit shortage caused by the COVID-19 pandemic.

As a result of planned cost cutting programs, the sale of Warner Bros. Interactive Entertainment was proposed, but ultimately abandoned due to COVID-19 related growth in the Gaming industry, as well as a positive reception to upcoming DC Comics, Lego Star Wars, and Harry Potter titles from fans and critics.

Crunchyroll was sold to Sony's Funimation for US$1.175 billion in December 2020, with the acquisition closing in August 2021.

On December 21, 2020, WarnerMedia acquired You.i TV, an Ottawa, Ontario-based developer of tools for building cross-platform video streaming apps. The company's products have been the basis of various WarnerMedia streaming platforms, including AT&T TV Now and the Turner channels' apps, and would be used as part of international expansion of HBO Max.

=== Spin-off from AT&T and merger with Discovery, Inc. ===
On May 16, 2021, it was reported that AT&T was in talks with Discovery, Inc.—which primarily operated television channels and platforms devoted to non-fiction and unscripted content—for it to merge with WarnerMedia, forming a publicly traded company that would be divided between its shareholders. The proposed spin-off and merger was officially announced the next day, which is to be structured as a Reverse Morris Trust. AT&T shareholders would receive a 71% stake in the merged company, which is expected to be led by Discovery's current CEO David Zaslav.

Electronic Arts, who were a bidder in the proposed sale of Warner Bros. Interactive Entertainment, purchased the mobile gaming studio Playdemic from WBIE for US$1.4 billion in June 2021.

In September 2021, WarnerMedia sold TMZ to Fox Corporation in a deal worth about $50 million, with TMZ being operated under the Fox Entertainment division.

In November 2021, Discovery and WarnerMedia discussed a plan to combine the two streaming services, HBO Max and Discovery+, into one streaming service in two phases: an initial phase that allows for quick bundling of the services and a second phase that allows for a common service on one tech platform. In the same month, it was announced that Discovery would rename itself Warner Bros. and reclassify and convert its stock into stock of WBD.

On December 22, 2021, it was announced that the deal was approved by the European Commission and it was scheduled to be completed on April 8, 2022, subject to approval by Discovery shareholders and additional closing conditions.

On January 5, 2022, The Wall Street Journal reported that WarnerMedia and ViacomCBS (now known as Paramount Global) were exploring a possible sale of either a majority stake or all of The CW, and that Nexstar Media Group was considered a leading bidder. The reports indicated that WarnerMedia and ViacomCBS could include a contractual commitment that would require any new owner to buy new programming from those companies, allowing them to reap some continual revenue through the network. The network's then-president and CEO Mark Pedowitz at the time confirmed talks of a potential sale in a memo to CW staffers, but added that "It's too early to speculate what might happen."

On January 26, 2022, it was reported that the merger between WarnerMedia and Discovery, Inc. was expected to close sometime during the second quarter of 2022.

On February 1, 2022, it was reported that AT&T was going to spin off WarnerMedia in a $43 billion deal. Also on the same month, it was announced that the WarnerMedia and Discovery merger was approved by the Brazilian antitrust regulator Cade.

On February 9, 2022, it was announced that the deal was approved by the United States Department of Justice. A day later, it was announced that Discovery's shareholders would board on meeting on March 11 to vote on the WarnerMedia merger. The deal was approved by Discovery shareholders on the same date.

On February 23, 2022, it was announced that the WarnerMedia-Discovery merger would close on April 8. On March 25, it was announced that AT&T would spin off WarnerMedia on April 8, marking AT&T's official exit from the entertainment business.

On April 5, it was announced that Kilar; Ann Sarnoff, Chair and CEO of WarnerMedia Studios and Networks Group; as well as Andy Forssell, executive vice president and general manager of HBO Max; were stepping down from their roles. The next day, chief financial officer Jennifer Biry, chief human resources officer Jim Cummings, chief revenue officer Tony Goncalves, communications and chief inclusion officer Christy Haubegger, WarnerMedia general counsel Jim Meza and chief technology officer Richard Tom were confirmed to be stepping down. The merger was completed on April 8.

After its merger with Discovery, Inc. to become Warner Bros. Discovery (WBD), WarnerMedia became defunct on April 8 but its corporate name is still used, such as on products of WBD's subsidiaries like on the DVDs of Cartoon Network and Adult Swim shows and movies.

== Corporate structure ==
As of April 2022, just prior to the Warner Bros. Discovery merger, WarnerMedia's executives were

- Jason Kilar (Chief Executive)
- Tony Goncalves (Executive Vice President, Chief Revenue Officer, Otter Media CEO)
- Ann Sarnoff (Chair and CEO of WarnerMedia Studios & Networks)
- Jennifer Biry (Chief Financial Officer)
- Gerhard Zeiler (President of WarnerMedia International)
- Richard Tom (Chief Technology Officer)
- James Cummings (Executive Vice President, Chief Human Resources Officer)
- Andy Forsell (EVP & General Manager of HBO Max)
- David Haddad (President of Warner Bros. Games)
- Christy Haubegger (Executive Vice President, Communications, Chief Inclusion Officer)
- Jim Meza (Executive Vice President and General Counsel)
- Michael Bass, Amy Entelis and Ken Jautz (Interim Co-Heads, CNN)

As of April 2022, its business divisions were:

WarnerMedia Studios & Networks	WarnerMedia News & Sports	WarnerMedia Sales & Distribution	WarnerMedia International	WarnerMedia Direct
Warner Bros. Entertainment; Home Box Office, Inc.; TNets (TBS, TNT, TruTV); The CW (50% stake)	CNN Worldwide; Turner Sports; Bleacher Report; AT&T SportsNet	Otter Media; WarnerMedia's Advertising, Distribution and Content Liscensing	WarnerMedia EMEA; WarnerMedia Latin America; WarnerMedia Asia Pacific	HBO Max

WarnerMedia Studios & Networks was created in August 2020 from the consolidation of WarnerMedia Entertainment's assets with Warner Bros. Entertainment.

WarnerMedia News & Sports was formed March 4, 2019, to handle Turner Broadcasting's news and sports assets.

WarnerMedia Sales & Distribution and WarnerMedia International were a part of the much bigger WarnerMedia Sales & International prior to it splitting

WarnerMedia Direct, LLC was a subsidiary of Warner Bros. Discovery, handling HBO Max's operations.
