= The Bacca Chronicles =

American animated web series

- Genre: Comedy; Adventure
- Created by: Jerome Aceti
- Written by: Jim Schwertfeger
- Directed by: Jerome Aceti
- Voices of: Jerome Aceti; ChimneySwift11; Eddie Pepitone; Natalie Casanova
- Country of origin: United States
- Original language: English
- No. of episodes: 10

Production
- Executive producer: Matty Kirsch
- Running time: 3–4 minutes
- Production company: Machinima, Inc.

Original release
- Network: go90
- Release: November 24 – December 29, 2015

The Bacca Chronicles is an American animated web series created by Jerome Aceti and produced by Machinima, the series debut on go90 to 2015.

== Episodes ==
| No. | Title | Original release date |
|---|---|---|
| 1 | "Bacca to the Future" | November 24, 2015 |
A Minecraft player name Kyle turn upside down after another player name Bacca fell and accidentally crash his house, angers to him for destroyed his house. He call moderator for bans him, but morderator refuse to bans Bacca.
| 2 | "Training Daze" | November 27, 2015 |
