= Pamela Abdy =

American film producer (born 1973)

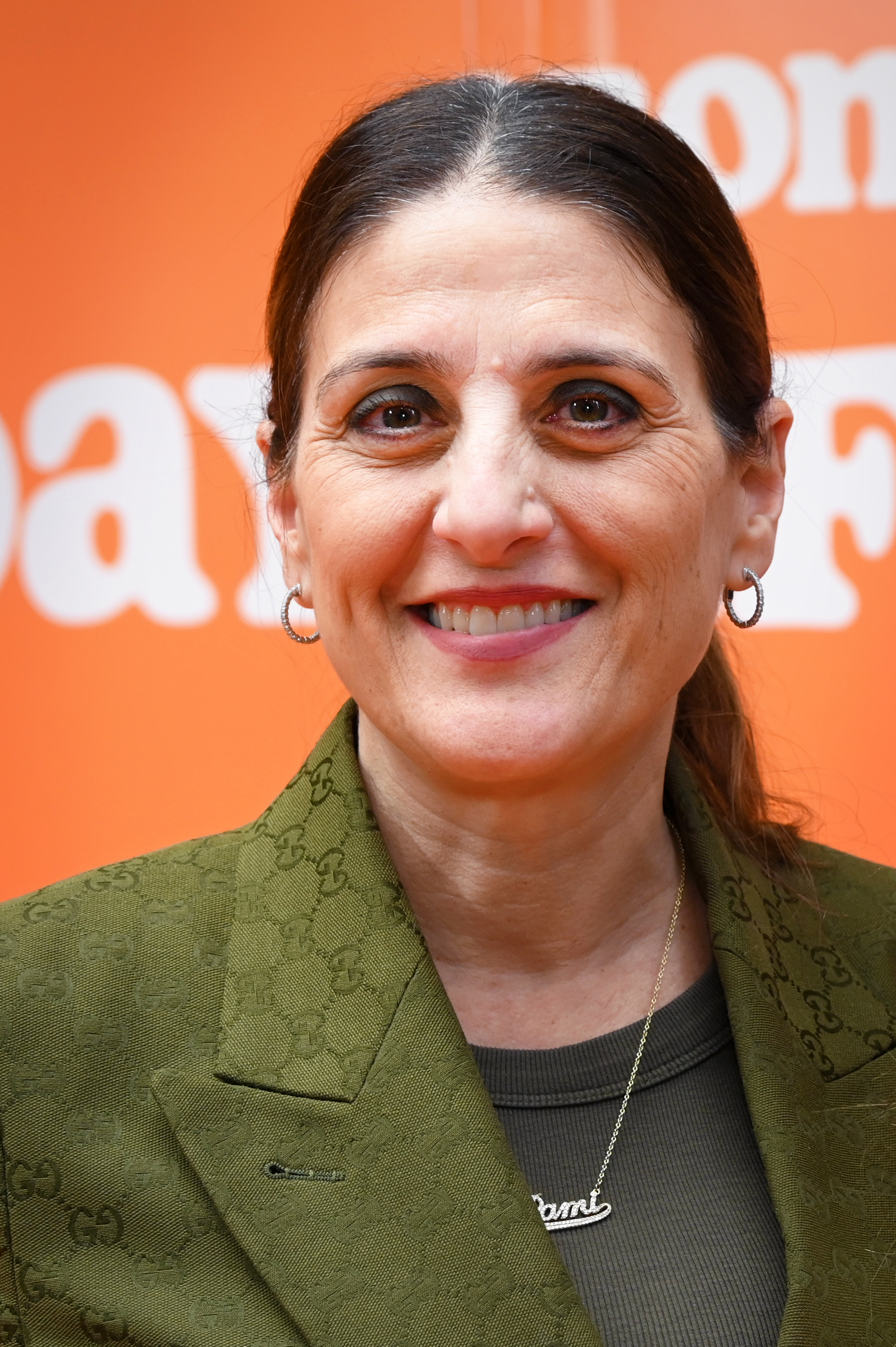
- Abdy in 2026
- Born: November 22, 1973 (age 52); United States
- Education: Emerson College
- Occupations: Film producer, film studio executive
- Years active: 1996–present

Pamela Abdy (born November 22, 1973) is an American film producer and studio executive. From 2022 to 2026, she served as co-chair and co-CEO of Warner Bros. Motion Picture Group along with Michael De Luca.

== Early life and career ==
Abdy was born to a Syrian American father and an Italian American mother. She danced competitively as a teenager and later graduated from Emerson College.

She began her film career at Jersey Films as an intern, and eventually became assistant to Danny DeVito. Through Jersey Films her first film as co-producer was Garden State in 2004. Subsequent executive roles include working at Makeready, New Regency, Bluegrass Films and Paramount. She was included in Variety's 2023 "Variety500", its list of influential global media leaders.

In 2026, she was awarded the inaugural Vanguard Award at the Women in Film Honors recognising breadth of her career, with a particular acknowledgment of her tenure at the Warner Bros. Motion Picture Group.

On October 2, 2026, it was announced that Abdy and Michael De Luca would be exiting Warner Bros. after the close of the Paramount and Warner Bros. merger. The merger closed on October 6, 2026.

== Selected filmography ==
Title	Year	Role
2004	Garden State	Producer
2013	Identity Thief	Producer
2013	47 Ronin	Producer
2014	Endless Love	Producer
2018	A Million Little Pieces	Producer
2019	Queen & Slim	Producer
