= Jason Kilar =

American technology and media executive

- Born: Jason Alan Kilar; April 26, 1971 (age 55); Pittsburgh, Pennsylvania, U.S.
- Education: University of North Carolina at Chapel Hill (BBA); Harvard University (MBA)
- Occupation: CEO of WarnerMedia
- Employer: WarnerMedia
- Known for: Co-founder and CEO of Hulu; Co-founder and CEO of Vessel; SVP at Amazon; CEO of WarnerMedia
- Board member of: Roblox; Wealthfront
- Spouse: Jamie Kilar
- Children: 4

Jason Alan Kilar (/ˈkaɪlər/; born April 26, 1971) is an American businessman. He is a member of the boards of Wealthfront and Roblox, and was CEO of WarnerMedia, from May 2020 to April 2022. He was previously a five-year board member of Opendoor and was an Amazon executive. Kilar is a co-founder of Vessel, and an initial executive of Hulu.

== Early life and education ==
Kilar was born on April 26, 1971, in Pittsburgh, Pennsylvania. His family moved to Boca Raton, Florida, during his junior year and ended up graduating from Spanish River Community High School in 1989. He attended the University of North Carolina at Chapel Hill, where he was a member of Sigma Nu fraternity. He graduated in 1993 and continued his education at Harvard Business School, earning an MBA in 1997.

== Career ==
Kilar was an executive at Amazon from 1997 to 2006, including as the senior vice president of its worldwide application software division. He helped found the streaming company Hulu in 2007 and became its CEO. On January 4, 2013, he announced his resignation from the company after five years, together with Hulu CTO Rich Tom. The next month, Kilar joined the board of directors for DreamWorks Animation.

In 2014, he announced Vessel, a subscription video service, of which he was CEO. The company was backed by investment firms Benchmark, Greylock Partners, and Bezos Expeditions, and then sold to Verizon Communications in 2016.

On April 1, 2020, WarnerMedia then-CEO John Stankey announced that Kilar would be assuming his CEO role effective May 1, 2020, and that Kilar would be reporting to Stankey, set to remain COO of AT&T. On April 24, 2020, it was announced that Stankey would become CEO of AT&T on July 1, 2020.

In December 2020, Kilar announced that Warner Bros. films released in 2021 would be released on HBO Max at the same time as they were released in theaters. The prior practice was to release films to theaters for a 90-day period before releasing them in other formats. The move was decried by many in Hollywood, including Christopher Nolan and Denis Villeneuve, while also being described as plainly violating the contractual rights of some of those who worked on the films. In March 2021, Kilar drew more ire by claiming that the COVID-19 pandemic was "really good for ratings" in conversation with Fox Corporation's Lachlan Murdoch. He later apologized for making this comment and added that "I would like nothing more than for this pandemic to be well behind us".

Kilar announced on April 5, 2022, that he would be stepping down as the WarnerMedia CEO, amid the merger of WarnerMedia and Discovery, Inc.

== Additional posts ==
He is a member of the board of directors of Wealthfront, and joined the Roblox board in September 2023. In June 2024, he resigned from the board of directors of Opendoor, which he'd joined in 2019. Kilar has also been a board member of DreamWorks Animation, which he'd joined in 2013, Univision, Habitat for Humanity, and Brighter.

Business positions
Preceded by John Stankey	WarnerMedia CEO; 2020–2022	Succeeded by David Zaslav
