= List of programmes broadcast by Nickelodeon Sonic =

This is a list of television programs currently and formerly broadcast by Sonic. The channel was launched on 20 December 2011.

== Current programming ==
- Pak Pak Pakau
- Pakdam Pakdai
- Pinaki & Happy – The Bhoot Bandhus
- Shiva
- The Adventures of Bernie
- Zig & Sharko
- Jungle Box
- Kamen Rider Gavv

== Former programming ==
=== Animated series ===
- Avatar: The Last Airbender
- Blackie the Funny Dog
- The Daltons
- Danger Mouse
- Dennis the Menace and Gnasher
- Dinobob
- Dinosaur King
- Ejen Ali
- Galactik Football
- Ghosts at School
- Ginga Densetsu Weed
- Sugarbunnies
- Hubert & Takako
- Hyperdimension Neptunia: The Animation
- Idaten Jump
- Jackie Chan's Fantasia
- Johnny Test
- Keymon Ache
- Kickers
- Kong: The Animated Series
- Kung Fu Panda: Legends of Awesomeness
- Motu Patlu
- Mighty Cat Masked Niyander
- Monsuno
- Ninja Hattori
- Oggy and the Cockroaches
- The Penguins of Madagascar
- Perman
- Rimba Racer
- Rock Lee & His Ninja Pals
- Rocket Monkeys
- Shaktimaan: The Animated Series
- Shaun the Sheep
- The Smurfs
- SpongeBob SquarePants
- Sonic Boom
- Supa Strikas
- Suraj: The Rising Star
- Teenage Mutant Ninja Turtles
- The Legend of Hanuman
- Ting Tong
- Zatchbell

=== Live-action ===
- Are You Afraid of the Dark?
- The Adrenaline Project
- Drake & Josh
- House of Anubis
- Ninja Turtles: The Next Mutation
- Power Rangers
  - Power Rangers Beast Morphers
  - Power Rangers Samurai
- Supah Ninjas
- Ultraman Mebius
