= Sourav Chakraborty (comedian) =

Indian actor and comedian

- Born: Sourav Satish Chakraborty Jamshedpur, Jharkhand, India
- Other name: Sourabh Jharkhandi
- Occupations: Actor; comedian
- Years active: 2006–present
- Known for: Motu Patlu; Oggy and the Cockroaches

Sourav Satish Chakraborty is an Indian actor and comedian who is most known for voicing the titular characters of the popular Indian television animated series Motu Patlu.

== Career ==
Sourav appeared in many programs as a comedian in mid-2000s. He became popular for mimicking various Bollywood actors e.g. Shah Rukh Khan, Sunny Deol, Paresh Rawal, Sunil Shetty, Mithun Chakraborty, Akshay Kumar, etc. in the 1999 animated TV series Oggy and the Cockroaches for Nickelodeon.

Sourav has appeared in various television serials among which are F.I.R., Bhabiji Ghar Par Hain!. He also runs Siddha Tara Productions studio in his hometown.

== Dubbing roles ==
=== Animated series ===
Program title	Character	Dub Language	Original language	Number of episodes	Original airdate	Dubbed airdate	Ref.
Oggy and the Cockroaches	Oggy	Hindi		169	6 September 1999	August 24, 2009	
Oggy and the Cockroaches	Jack	Hindi		169	6 September 1999	August 24, 2009	
Oggy and the Cockroaches	Dee Dee (Motu)	Hindi		169	6 September 1999	August 24, 2009	
Oggy and the Cockroaches	Marky (Lambu)	Hindi		169	6 September 1999	August 24, 2009	
Oggy and the Cockroaches	Joey (Chhotu)	Hindi		169	6 September 1999	August 24, 2009	
Oggy and the Cockroaches	Bob	Hindi		169	6 September 1999	August 24, 2009	
Motu Patlu	Motu	Hindi	Hindi	468	16 October 2012		
Motu Patlu	Patlu	Hindi	Hindi	468	16 October 2012		
Motu Patlu	John	Hindi	Hindi	468	16 October 2012		
Motu Patlu	Doctor Jhatka	Hindi	Hindi	468	16 October 2012		
Motu Patlu	Ghasitaram	Hindi	Hindi	468	16 October 2012		
Motu Patlu	Inspector Chingum	Hindi	Hindi	468	16 October 2012		
Motu Patlu	Boxer	Hindi	Hindi	468	16 October 2012		
Shaun the Sheep	Shaun	Hindi			5 March 2007		
Shaun the Sheep	Bitzer (Captain)	Hindi			5 March 2007		
Shaun the Sheep	The Farmer (Kishanlal)	Hindi			5 March 2007		
Shaun the Sheep	The Naughty Pigs (Golu, Molu, Bholu)	Hindi			5 March 2007		
Zig & Sharko	Zig	Hindi		104	21 December 2010		
Zig & Sharko	Bernie (Circuit)	Hindi		104	21 December 2010		
Zig & Sharko	Sharko	Hindi		104	21 December 2010		
Pakdam Pakdai	Doggy Don	Hindi		691	27 May 2013		
Pakdam Pakdai	Colonel	Hindi		691	27 May 2013		
Pakdam Pakdai	Chhotu	Hindi		691	27 May 2013		
Pakdam Pakdai	Lambu	Hindi		691	27 May 2013		
Pakdam Pakdai	Motu	Hindi		691	27 May 2013		
Pakdam Pakdai	Ballu	Hindi		691	27 May 2013		
Gattu Battu	Ting Tong	Hindi	Hindi		1 May 2017		
Gattu Battu	Wring Wrong	Hindi	Hindi		1 May 2017		
Gattu Battu	Bhatawadekar	Hindi	Hindi		1 May 2017		
Gattu Battu	Manmani	Hindi	Hindi		1 May 2017		
Gattu Battu	Chamach Singh	Hindi	Hindi		1 May 2017		
Gattu Battu	Sher Singh	Hindi	Hindi		1 May 2017		
Gattu Battu	Daya	Hindi	Hindi		1 May 2017		
Gattu Battu	Baya	Hindi	Hindi		1 May 2017		
Gattu Battu	Bheema	Hindi	Hindi		1 May 2017		
Ting Tong	Ting Tong	Hindi	Hindi		28 September 2020		
Ting Tong	Wring Wrong	Hindi	Hindi		28 September 2020		

=== Animated films ===
Year	Film title	Character	Language	Ref.
2013	Motu Patlu: Mission Moon	Motu	Hindi	
2014	Motu Patlu: Deep Sea Adventure	Motu	Hindi	
2014	Motu Patlu: Kung Fu Kings	Motu	Hindi	
2015	Motu Patlu Aur Khazaane Ki Race	Motu	Hindi	
2015	Motu Patlu in Carnival Island	Motu	Hindi	
2015	Motu Patlu 36 Ghantey - Race against time	Motu	Hindi	
2016	Motu Patlu: King of Kings	Motu	Hindi	
2017	Motu Patlu in Hong Kong: Kung Fu Kings 3	Motu	Hindi	
2017	Motu Patlu in Octopus World	Motu	Hindi	
2017	Motu Patlu in Dragon's World	Motu	Hindi	
2018	Motu Patlu Kung Fu Kings 4 The Challenge of Kung Fu Brothers	Motu	Hindi	
2018	Motu Patlu in the City of Gold	Motu	Hindi	
2018	Motu Patlu Dino Invasion	Motu	Hindi	
2019	Motu Patlu VS Robo Kids	Motu	Hindi	
2019	Motu Patlu in the Game of Zones	Motu	Hindi	
2019	Motu Patlu the Superheroes – Super Villains from Mars	Motu	Hindi	
2020	Motu Patlu The Superheroes VS Alien Ghost	Motu	Hindi	
2021	Motu Patlu in the Planet of No Return	Motu	Hindi	
2021	Motu Patlu In The Toy World	Motu	Hindi	
2021	Motu Patlu VS Dr. Destroyer	Motu	Hindi	
2021	Motu Patlu Kung Fu Kings Returns	Motu	Hindi	
2022	Motu Patlu and The Secrets of Devil's Heart	Motu	Hindi	
2023	Motu Patlu In The Metal World	Motu	Hindi	
2024	Motu Patlu & The Race to the Diamond Valley			
2024	Motu Patlu & The Rise of Zombies			

=== Films ===
Year	Film	Dubbing for	Dub Language	Original language	Hindi Dubbed Title
2005	Athadu	Brahmanandam	Hindi	Telugu	Cheetah The Power Of One
2006	Samanyudu	M.S. Narayana	Hindi	Telugu	Mission To Finish Corruption
2006	Khatarnak	Venu Madhav	Hindi	Telugu	Main Hoon Khatarnak
2007	Chirutha	Brahmanandam	Hindi	Telugu	
2007	Dhee	Brahmanandam	Hindi	Telugu	Sabse Badi Hera Pheri
2008	Krishna	Brahmanandam	Hindi	Telugu	
2009	Magadheera	Brahmanandam	Hindi	Telugu	
2010	Porki	Sadhu Kokila	Hindi	Kannada	
2010	Darling	M.S. Narayana	Hindi	Telugu	Sabse Badhkar Hum
2010	Brindaavanam	Brahmanandam	Hindi	Telugu	The Super Khiladi
2011	Gaganam	Brahmanandam	Hindi	Telugu	Mere Hindustan Ki Kasam
2011	Sakthi	Brahmanandam	Hindi	Telugu	Ek Tha Soldier
2011	Mr. Perfect	Brahmanandam	Hindi	Telugu	No. 1 Mr. Perfect
2011	Dhada	Brahmanandam	Hindi	Telugu	
2012	Nippu	Brahmanandam	Hindi	Telugu	Main Insaaf Karoonga
2012	Gabbar Singh	Brahmanandam	Hindi	Telugu	Policewala Gunda
2012	Daruvu	Brahmanandam	Hindi	Telugu	Jeene Nahi Doonga
2012	Devudu Chesina Manushulu	Brahmanandam	Hindi	Telugu	Dadagiri

== Filmography ==
Year	Film	Role	Language	Notes
2012	Masala		Marathi	
2012	Maximum	Shuklaji	Hindi	

=== Television ===
Year	Title	Role	Notes	Ref.
2006	Johny Aala Re	Contestant	Segment 3 - Main Bhi Johny	
2007	Comedy Ka Badsshah – Hasega India	Contestant		
2008	The Great Indian Laughter Challenge	Contestant	Season 4 - Episode 1, 3	
2008	Comedy Champions	Contestant		
2009	Star Gold Lux Comedy Honors	Gag actor		
2009	Idea Bollywood Club	Contestant		
2009	Maniben.com	Baake Bihari		
2009-2010	Yeh Chanda Kanoon Hai	Duryodhan	Episode 29, 30	
2009-2010	Yeh Chanda Kanoon Hai	Samar Singh	Episode 58	
2009-2010	Yeh Chanda Kanoon Hai	Jatin Pendulkar	Episode 59, 60	
2006-2015	F.I.R.	Various characters	Episode 805, 806, 807, 808, 809	
2017	May I Come In Madam?	Shatru (CEO kidnapper)	Episode 373, 374	
2024	Bhabiji Ghar Par Hain!	Saumitra Babu's Spirit	Episode 2443, 2444	
2024	Happu Ki Ultan Paltan	Railway employee	Episode 1387, 1388	

== Awards & nominations ==
Year	Award	Category	Result	Notes	Ref.
2016	Nickelodeon Kids’ Choice Awards	Favorite Indian Cartoon Character	Won		
2016	Orbit Live - Animation Voice Artiste Awards	Popular Animation Voice - Male	Won		

== See also ==
- List of Indian dubbing artists
