= TeenNick =

American pay television channel

- Logo used since January 1, 2024 (Note: The logo's wordmark has been in use since September 28, 2009. Additionally, this is a variant meant to be used for white backgrounds; the main variant has a yellow (for Teen) and white (for Nick) wordmark in conjunction with a fully orange splat.)
- Country: United States
- Broadcast area: Nationwide
- Headquarters: One Astor Plaza; New York City, U.S.

Programming
- Languages: English; Spanish (via SAP audio track)
- Picture format: 1080i HDTV (downscaled to letterboxed 480i for the SDTV feed)

Ownership
- Owner: Skydance Corporation
- Parent: Nickelodeon Group
- Sister channels: List: Adult Swim; Boomerang; Cartoon Network; Cartoonito; Discovery Familia; Discovery Family; Nickelodeon; Nick at Nite; Nick Jr.; NickMusic; Nicktoons

History
- Launched: September 28, 2009; 17 years ago
- Replaced: Nickelodeon Games and Sports for Kids; The N

Availability

Streaming media
- Affiliated streaming service: Paramount+
- Service(s): Hulu + Live TV, Philo, Sling TV, YouTube TV

TeenNick is an American pay television channel owned by the Nickelodeon Group, a subdivision of the television division of Skydance Corporation. Aimed primarily at preteens and teenagers, its lineup includes a variety of live-action series inherited from Nickelodeon.

The channel launched on September 28, 2009, supplanting two defunct programming blocks which also targeted teenagers: the namesake TEENick on Nickelodeon and The N on Noggin. TeenNick's channel space was first occupied by Nickelodeon Games and Sports for Kids from March 1999 to December 2007, followed by a short-lived, 24-hour version of The N. Nick Cannon, the original host of TEENick, was described in publicity materials as the new channel's "chairman" and programming consultant. Cannon also hosted several shows on TeenNick, including TeenNick Top 10.

As of November 2023, TeenNick is available to approximately 44 million pay television households in the United States, down from its peak of 75 million in 2013.

== History ==
=== Precursor programming blocks (2001–2009) ===
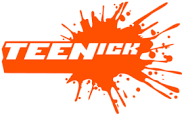
TEENick logo (with a splat version used from January 7, 2007 to February 1, 2009) during its run as a programming block

TEENick was a tween-oriented programming block on Nickelodeon that ran from March 4, 2001, to February 1, 2009. It originally aired on Sunday nights from 6:00 to 9:00 p.m. Eastern Time; a Saturday night edition, airing from 8:00 to 10:00 p.m. Eastern Time, was introduced in 2005 as a replacement for SNICK. The Saturday night block was branded "TEENick Saturday Night" until 2006, when both broadcasts were unified under the TEENick name. It was first hosted by Nick Cannon, followed by Jason "J. Boogie" Everhart. TEENick's programming mainly consisted of live-action comedies, such as Drake & Josh, Ned's Declassified School Survival Guide, Zoey 101, True Jackson, VP, and iCarly, as well as occasional reruns of animated shows such as All Grown Up! and My Life as a Teenage Robot.

A year after TEENick's debut, Noggin introduced The N as an overnight block on April 1, 2002, airing daily from 6:00 p.m. to 6:00 a.m. Eastern Time. Series previously featured during Noggin's time as an all-ages channel, such as A Walk in Your Shoes and Sponk!, migrated to The N. The block spawned several original series, including the animated comedy O'Grady and the live-action dramas Out There and South of Nowhere. The N was also the U.S. broadcast home of Canada's Degrassi: The Next Generation. As with Noggin, The N's programming was developed with educational goals, which was uncommon for teen programming at the time.

On August 13, 2007, Viacom announced it would shut down Nickelodeon Games and Sports for Kids at the end of the year, with a 24-hour version of The N taking over its channel space. The N's standalone network ran for less than two years, from December 31, 2007 to September 28, 2009. A block known as "TEENick on The N" introduced several TEENick series into the channel's daytime lineup, including Drake & Josh, Ned's Declassified School Survival Guide, and Zoey 101. Over time, The N's programming would slowly be phased out.

=== TeenNick channel (2009–present) ===
The TeenNick logo from January 1, 2019 to January 1, 2024

Splatless version of the 2023 TeenNick logo, with "teen" in yellow, concurrently used alongside the main version since January 1, 2024

The TeenNick channel debuted on September 28, 2009, at 6 a.m. ET, accompanied by the debut of a new logo, designed by New York-based creative director/designer Eric Zim. Nick Cannon, the original host of the TEENick block itself, was declared in publicity materials as the "Chairman of TeenNick." Cannon had a major presence on the channel, appearing in network promotions, continuing to be associated in some way with the network until the cancellation of the TeenNick Top 10 in 2018. Several shows from TEENick and The N's program libraries were carried over to the TeenNick channel, though the majority of the programming came from TEENick's library rather than The N's.

On February 1, 2010, TeenNick began incorporating music videos into its morning and afternoon schedule on a regular basis, airing between certain programs and effectively reducing commercial breaks within programs where a music video is to be aired afterward from 6 a.m. to 3 p.m. ET (this had been done periodically for some time before that date, usually airing between 6 and 8 a.m. ET, although not every day), same thing as Nickelodeon did with programs such as iCarly, Big Time Rush, Victorious, and How to Rock. In July 2011, TeenNick began carrying programs originally filmed for high-definition broadcast in a letterboxed format, due to the absence of an HD simulcast feed of the channel at the time. After Nicktoons and Nick Jr. launched HD services in 2013, TeenNick was the only Nickelodeon-branded network without an HD simulcast network until September 2016; this remains limited to IPTV providers and some cable company mobile and digital media player apps, such as that of Spectrum.

On January 1, 2024, TeenNick (along with Nicktoons) rebranded to use the refreshed Splat logo and new on-air interstitials, similar to Nickelodeon, which debuted this logo on March 4, 2023. This refresh also changes the color for "Teen" from pink to yellow.

==== Nighttime programming block ====
From 2011 to 2022, TeenNick aired a "retro" programming block dedicated to reruns of classic Nickelodeon series. It was inspired by a large amount of interest in Nickelodeon's programs from the 1990s on social media outlets. The block was originally known as "The '90s Are All That," in reference to the sketch comedy series All That that was a fixture on Nickelodeon throughout the 1990s and 2000s. To align itself with Nickelodeon's cross-platform branding, the block was renamed three times: to "The Splat" on October 5, 2015; to "NickSplat" on May 1, 2017; and to its final name "NickRewind" on March 18, 2019. NickRewind was closed on January 31, 2022, returning the channel to a 24-hour regular channel with no specific theming or programming blocks.

== Programming ==
As of 2024, the network's main programming consists of reruns of Nickelodeon-produced series and specials, feature films, and acquired programs broadcast in multi-hour blocks.

=== Programming history ===
In the early years following its launch, TeenNick had somewhat lightened programming content standards than the other Nickelodeon channels. In addition to reruns of the TEENick block's tween-targeted shows, the TeenNick channel acquired several foreign shows with more mature content (such as profanity or suggestive dialogue), like Open Heart and Degrassi. Following Degrassi's cancellation in summer 2015, the channel had removed most of the other programming to almost exclusively air reruns of Nickelodeon's original series. By 2019, TeenNick de facto shared the same content standards as other Nickelodeon networks. This year also marked another rebranding, which saw the network billed as "Viacom's tween-oriented cable network" instead of a network for teenagers.

Many programs that had aired on TEENick, and several programs that had aired on The N, were carried over to TeenNick. These were mixed with some syndicated shows from other networks. On April 20, 2011, TeenNick announced that it had acquired the rights to air Buffy the Vampire Slayer starting in May, though this was short-lived and it returned to FX (and later Pivot) within a matter of months.

TeenNick produced few original shows. The first original series produced under the TeenNick name, the half-hour teen drama Gigantic, ran from October 2010 to April 22, 2011. The last original program exclusive to TeenNick, the music video countdown show TeenNick Top 10, was cancelled in 2018, commensurate with Viacom's "six prime networks" strategy introduced the previous year effectively cutting out all but Nickelodeon and Nick Jr. from airing original children's series on their network spaces. First-run episodes of series airing on TeenNick since then have been primarily unaired episodes of Nickelodeon series that were canceled due to low ratings on the flagship channel, such as Hollywood Heights, House of Anubis, Bucket & Skinner's Epic Adventures, and Star Falls. Also, Alien Dawn, and foreign shows from international Nickelodeon networks which receive a minimum US run to fulfill contracts, such as Life with Boys, Dance Academy, H_{2}O: Just Add Water, and Alien Surf Girls. As TeenNick has a high definition feed with very limited distribution, and is nearly exclusive to higher-cost digital cable tiers, ratings for those shows traditionally have a drastic fall with a move to TeenNick, alongside the network producing few promotions referring the transplanted programming.

On July 15, 2019, the network began programming its primetime lineup with a mix of content from MTV, including reruns of Teen Wolf and My Super Sweet 16, and series which originated as YouTube Originals from AwesomenessTV (a company founded by Nickelodeon president Brian Robbins and frequent co-collaborator Joe Davola). Season three of Hunter Street (which airs on weeknights over a month), initially meant for Nickelodeon, began to air on the channel on July 29, 2019. By December 2019, regular Nickelodeon repeats had returned to the primetime lineup.

Nick Cannon's on-air role as chairman of the network ended after TeenNick Top 10 was canceled in March 2018. This was the last series produced by Cannon's company, NCredible Entertainment, for the network. In July 2020, Cannon was fired from all roles at ViacomCBS due to antisemitic statements, though later returned after making several apologies and amends for his behavior.

=== NickRewind ===
NickRewind was TeenNick's late-night programming block dedicated to Nickelodeon's former programs, mainly from the 1990s. Originally launched on July 25, 2011, as The '90s Are All That, NickRewind operated in much the similar way as Nick at Nite, which serves as a separate identity for the overnight programming on Nickelodeon, though NickRewind was not considered its own network in Nielsen ratings due to targeting the same demographic as TeenNick. After relaunching as The Splat in 2015, the block expanded to include programming from the 1980s to early-mid 2000s. The block was closed on January 31, 2022.

== International versions ==
=== Current ===
- Israel – launched on March 20, 2017.
- Poland – launched on September 1, 2021 as a television channel.
- Germany, Austria, and Switzerland – in May 2020, Pluto TV launched international feeds in these countries.
- Australia – launched on August 1, 2023 as a FAST channel on 10Play (as NickTeen)

=== Defunct ===
- Middle East & North Africa – launched on April 15, 2017. Closed on November 25, 2024
- UK & Ireland – Launched on 2009 as a programming block on Nickelodeon. Closed on July 30, 2010.
- Netherlands and Flanders – launched on February 14, 2011, as a programming block on Nickelodeon. Closed down on September 30, 2015 and replaced by Spike, now Paramount Network.
- India – launched on November 21, 2012, as a programming block on Nick Jr. Closed on February 1, 2017.
- Italy – launched on December 4, 2015. Closed down on May 2, 2020.
- France – launched on November 19, 2014, as Nickelodeon 4Teen, rebranded as Nickelodeon Teen on August 26, 2017. Replaced by Nicktoons on July 15, 2025.
- Vietnam – a TeenNick block was launched on HTV3 on September 28, 2018. Closed in 2022.
- Greece – available as a programming block on Rise TV. Closen in July 2022.
- Brazil – launched on Pluto TV on September 21, 2021 as NickTeen.
- Latin America – launched on September 14, 2020, replacing the former Nick HD feed known as Nick 2. Closed on December 31, 2025.
- Hungary – launched on January 12, 2021, replacing RTL Spike. Closed on December 31, 2025.
- Romania – launched on January 12, 2021, replacing Paramount Channel. Closed on December 31, 2025.
