= Kal Kissne Dekha =

2009 Indian film by Vivek Sharma

- Theatrical release poster
- Directed by: Vivek Sharma
- Written by: Vivek Sharma; Shyam Goel; Sudhanshu Dube
- Produced by: Vashu Bhagnani
- Starring: Jackky Bhagnani; Vaishali Desai; Rishi Kapoor; Akshay Kapoor; Nushrat Bharucha
- Cinematography: Johny Lal
- Edited by: Sanjay Verma
- Music by: Sajid–Wajid
- Production company: Pooja Entertainment
- Distributed by: BIG Pictures
- Release date: 12 June 2009
- Running time: 134 minutes
- Country: India
- Language: Hindi

Kal Kissne Dekha (lit. 'Who has seen tomorrow?'; contextually: Who knows what will happen tomorrow?) is a 2009 Indian Hindi-language romantic science fiction film directed by Vivek Sharma, who earlier directed Bhootnath. The film introduces debutantes Jackky Bhagnani and Vaishali Desai. It has been reported to have similarities with the 2007 American film Next, starring Nicolas Cage. Kal Kissne Dekha was released on 12 June 2009. Upon release, it received negative reviews.

== Plot ==
Nihal Singh is a teen from Chandigarh who loves to build complicated gadgets to learn what is behind science. He has a brilliant mind and dreams of studying at an elite science institute. When he is accepted into his dream college in Mumbai, he discovers college is a whole new world, with new people and new challenges. At college, Nihal is attracted to Meesha, a proud, rude brat. She cannot accept that Nihal is managing to charm everyone his way, including Professor Siddharth Verma, the warden of the college.

Nihal starts to get visions of Meesha being in danger. He saves her life, and his secret is revealed: he can see the future. After this incident, love blossoms between Nihal and Meesha. Meanwhile, media exposure results in attention from anti-social elements, including an explosion at a mall. Nihal sees the explosion before it takes place and manages to rescue most people. It turns out one of Nihal's friends is behind the attack. Despite seeing the bomber, he keeps quiet and doesn't tell the police department. He strengthens up and decides to fight the attacker himself. At the end, it was found that the attacker was none other than Professor Siddharth Verma. He reached his house, and after leaving from there, he took a car from there and ran to the hotel where many people were residing. At last, he got to know that bomb was planted in the car he took from the professor's house. In the end, he saved the people from the bomb blast, and the professor was killed in his own blast. The movie ends with Nihal and Meesha's marriage, where the media interrupts them by asking whether they will have a boy or girl.

== Cast ==
- Jackky Bhagnani as Nihaal Singh
- Vaishali Desai as Misha Kapoor
- Akshay Kapoor as Kabir Ahuja
- Rishi Kapoor as Professor Siddharth Verma
- Nushrat Bharucha as Ria
- Ishita Raj Sharma as Bhumi
- Ritesh Deshmukh as Kali Charan (extended cameo appearance)
- Archana Puran Singh as Bebe (Nihaal's mother)
- Satish Shah as Mr. Vinod Kapoor (Misha's father)
- Rahul Dev as Marshal
- Vrajesh Hirjee as Police Inspector
- Farida Jalal as Maria
- Sanjay Dutt as DJ (special appearance)
- Juhi Chawla (special appearance)
- Rajpal Yadav as Jailor Of Central Jail
- Rachna Shah as Yana
- Vishwajeet Pradhan as Bomb Disposal

== Music ==
Kal Kissne Dekha

Soundtrack album by Sajid–Wajid with lyrics by Sameer
- Released: 17 March 2009 (India)
- Genre: Feature film soundtrack
- Length: 42:33
- Label: Big Music

The music was composed by Sajid–Wajid, with lyrics by Sameer.

Track listing
No.	Title	Artist(s)	Length
1.	"Alam Guzarne Ko"	Sonu Nigam, Suzanne D'Mello	4:40
2.	"Kal Kissne Dekha"	Shaan, Shreya Ghoshal, Bob	4:58
3.	"Kal Kissne Dekha" (Club Mix)	Shaan, Shreya Ghoshal, Bob	4:59
4.	"Soniye Billori"	Sonu Nigam, Suzanne D'Mello	5:15
5.	"Jashn Hai"	Alisha Chinoy, Neeraj Shridhar, Wajid	4:43
6.	"Bin Tere Mar Jawan"	Shreya Ghoshal	1:26
7.	"Tere Bina Lagta Nahi Mera Jiya"	Wajid	4:41
8.	"Soniye Billori" (Club Mix)	Sonu Nigam, Suzanne D'Mello	5:29
9.	"Kal Kissne Dekha" (Romantic Version)	Wajid	1:46
10.	"Aasmaan Jhuk Gaya"	Shaan, Shreya Ghoshal	4:33

== Production ==
The film commenced shooting on 18 June 2008 in the University of the Witwatersrand in Johannesburg, South Africa. Durban, Cape Town, Stellenbosch (a town near Cape Town) and the University of Stellenbosch were the other locations. The prominent oaks in Stellenbosch can be clearly seen in many of the scenes. One of the dance numbers was shot in the university's library.

In March 2009, it was announced that Azharuddin Mohammed Ismail and Rubina Ali, two of the child stars of Slumdog Millionaire (2008), were cast in Kal Kissne Dekha.
