= Rimba Racer =

Malaysian animated series

- Genre: Sports; Adventure; Comedy
- Created by: Tariq Mohd. Noh (Executive Producer)
- Developed by: Glue Studios
- Written by: Choong Chi-Ren
- Directed by: Mohd. Azizul Hakim Md. Hussin (Season 1)
- Voices of: Steven Tan; Iain McNally; Choong Chi-Ren; Sherilyn Pang Li Ching; Assila Liyana Ahmad Badri; Kevin Adrian Barnaby; Tikriti Shabudin; Azman Zulkiply; Chan Su Ling; Nadia Mahmud; Fadhil Luqman; Yvonne Chong Shin Vun
- Theme music composer: Shaheir Jibin, Izzy Musa
- Opening theme: Rimba Racer Opening Theme
- Country of origin: Malaysia
- Original languages: Malay; English
- No. of seasons: 2
- No. of episodes: 26

Production
- Producer: Muhamad Ayman Jamaludin
- Running time: 22 minutes
- Production company: Glue Studios

Original release
- Network: TV9 (season 1); TV3 (season 2)
- Release: December 25, 2014 – June 21, 2019

Rimba Racer is a Malaysian animated television series created by Glue Studios. The series follows a young, aspiring racer named Tag who enters the prestigious auto racing league, the Rimba Grand Prix, to fulfill his dream of racing, but also discovers a conspiracy in its midst and collaborates with other racers to unravel the subversive forces behind the sport. Rimba Racer is Malaysia's first anthropomorphic themed cartoon. Its first episode premiered on 25 December 2014 on Nickelodeon India before its airing in its home country on TV3. This animation is currently airing on TV9.

The show is noted as one of the success stories of local Malaysian animation startups.

== Premise ==
=== Setting ===
The series is set in a fictional futuristic world of anthropomorphic animals, and focuses on the Rimba Grand Prix (RGP), a professional racing competition involving drivers in high-tech vehicles. Each vehicle is equipped with a special ability that allows the driver to gain the advantage or inhibit opponents, but can only be used once per race. These special abilities are unique to each vehicle and the driver. For example, the Thunder Strike ability allows Tag's car to leap into the air over a small distance, and Axle's car, the Falcon Mach-1, uses hyperspeed for a brief burst of acceleration.

Most of the narrative takes place aboard an expansive RGP-branded airship The Ark, which ferries the racers and their cars, along with RGP officials and crews, to locations across the world. In addition to living quarters for the racers, the ship features servicing garages for each vehicle complete with a fuel pump, large computer monitors, and an elevator that transports the car directly to a launch hangar below deck. There are also TV broadcasting studios, a luxury lounge, an executive office, and a simulation room, among other onboard amenities. In the second season, the ship is retrofitted with a virtual racing facility lined with pods for each racer for competing on virtual tracks, but has been used at least once in the series.

=== Synopsis ===
==== Season 1 ====
21-year-old street-racing prodigy Tag pilots the Ripper, a race car inherited from his father, legendary racer Riq the Ripper who died in a racing accident thirteen years prior. He lives in poverty with Miles, a mechanic and his personal guardian. Tag and Miles are soon recruited to the RGP by King, head of the organization. Tag eagerly joins the race, which consists of Sonny, Meika, Meelo, Tamira, Krom, Wrecks, Cuckoo, Ooaa, and repeat racing champion Axle. Tag initially struggles in the races and confronts difficulties of being accepted by the other racers, except for Sonny, Meika, and Meelo whom he quickly befriends. Eventually, however, his improving performance on the track makes him a public sensation, and the media dubs him the "Super Rookie."

Tag and Miles become suspicious when King offers them a personal financial backing in exchange for their loyalty. This is vindicated when King instructs Tamira to sideline Tag from a race as reprisal for rejecting the offer. Tag and Miles conclude that King is scripting the races with drivers and enlist Sonny, Meika, and Meelo to take him on for his actions. Anticipating this, King orchestrates a team race during which the Ripper is totaled, and Sonny is rendered comatose. Dejected by the chain of events, Tag resigns from the RGP in protest, causing the public to distrust King. Meanwhile, Tamira, who has been feigning alliance with King, attempts to steal incriminating data from his office computer, but she is spotted and flees. Pursued by King's henchmen, she goes into hiding with a covert partner and gives Tag her money to repair his car, urging him to rejoin the RGP. Elsewhere, Sonny fully recovers from his injuries, and he, Meika, and Meelo assist Tag and Miles in successfully rebuilding the Ripper. Tag then returns to the races, much to King's chagrin.

Tag and his friends continue working together in the final race to prevent Axle from finishing in the lead. At the same time, Tamira and Miles sneak into the RPG headquarters building to steal a black box containing evidence of King's wrongdoings. On the final approach, Tag manages to stop Axle but crashes out in the process; this allows Tamira and Miles to escape with the box. Axle retains his championship title, while Tag wins a silver medal. After the award ceremony, Tag and the others confront King over the box and reach a pact requiring him to keep out of the races in exchange for withholding the evidence from the public. However, King reports this incident to his employers, the Ringmasters, who reprimand him and reveal that Meika has been in league with them all along. Later, Tamira brings Tag and Miles to her partner, who turns out to be Riq, who still had been alive.

==== Season 2 ====
Six months later, Tag and Miles enter their second year with the RGP, which sees three newer recruits: Pike, Vyxx, and Xeno (Cuckoo, Ooaa, and Wrecks have since left the races). Despite their nascent position, the threesome fervently outperform the veteran racers. Worsening matters, Tag blames Miles for his father's supposed death, creating a rift that causes his performance to suffer. Seeking to mend their relationship, Riq secretly meets with his son and Miles to explain that his accident was staged, and that he has since faked death to get close to those involved in the attempt on his life. Tag and Miles reconcile upon learning the truth.

Meanwhile, Meelo and Tamira make several unsuccessful attempts to access data about the Ringmasters in the box, which Meika had secretly encrypted to protect their identities. Tag and his friends catch Meika trespassing in Meelo's private quarters where the box is stashed and deduce her alliance with the Ringmasters. Riq also shares intelligence that Vyxx, Xeno, and Pike are in fact career criminals hired by them. Meika soon has a change of heart and tricks the Ringmasters into providing Meelo a cipher key needed to decode the files. However, Xeno's nanobots that she had unknowingly planted on the box alert the trio to Meelo's hacking attempt, and they set the device to self-destruct, destroying all criminal evidence.

Now seeing Tag as an impediment, Pike pursues multiple methods of removing him from the tournament, such as falsely accusing him of racketeering and cheating, which prompts a formal investigation by Inspector Hart, and choreographing a race to annihilate him. Each effort fails because of King and Meika's intercession. Wary of this, the Ringmasters assign Pike and Vyxx to closely monitor them. During the final race wherein only Tag, Axle, Pike, Xeno, and Meelo qualify, Vyxx confronts King with a recording of him consorting with Miles and attempts to kill him for double-crossing the Ringmasters, but Riq helps King escape. Axle, who has been abetting the Ringmasters, defects to Tag and knocks Pike out of the races. However, Meelo finishes as the champion, breaking Axle's winning streak. Vyxx is arrested, and King is declared a fugitive, though Pike and Xeno have vanished. Hart, a member of the Ringmasters, is named RGP's new chief, giving them greater leverage on the racing company.

== Characters ==
Racer	Animal	Vehicle	Voiced by	
Racer	Animal	Vehicle	Malay	English
Tag	Malayan tiger	Ripper	Azman Zulkiply	Steven Tan
Axle	eagle	Falcon Mach-1	Azman Zulkiply	Steven Tan
Sonny	sun bear	Boomboxer	Fuad Md. Din	Choong Chi-Ren
Meika	fox	Belladonna	Ida Rahayu	Assila Liyana Ahmad Badri
Meelo	chameleon	Azureus Dart	Usamah Zaid	Tikriti Shabudin
Tamira	black panther	Lunar Shadow	Aina Nadzir	Sherilyn Pang Li Ching
Krom	saltwater crocodile	Heavy Metal	Shafiq Isa	Azman Zulkiply
Wrecks	Indian rhinoceros	Atlas	Megat Zahrin	Kevin Adrian Barnaby
Cuckoo	rooster	Ruby Star	Shafiq Isa	Azman Zulkiply
Ooaa	chimpanzee	Golden Cosmos	Iain McNally	Azman Zulkiply
Pike	Eurasian wolf	Cerberus	Khairul Azmi Bin Abd Rahman	Fadhil Luqman
Vyxx	spotted hyena	Daisy Doll	Nur Aleesya Wong Lee Yien	Yvonne Chong Shin Vun
Xeno	toad	Andromeda	-	

== Reception ==
Rimba Racer received an award for best animation series at the 2015 Malaysian Film Festival. Rimba Racer has been positively received on IMDb, with the rating at 8.4/10.

== Broadcast ==
Rimba Racer was first exported to Nickelodeon India on 25 December 2014. The first season of the series aired on Disney XD and Daily Motion on 27 September 2017. Season 2 premiered on YouTube before it aired on TV9 in Malaysia by 4 January 2019. So far, all 13 episodes of the first season have aired on Netflix. The first season was aired in India in Hindi dub on Nickelodeon Sonic in the year 2016 (or) 2017 and it aired till late 2018 and also in Nick HD+ in the year middle 2017 and it aired till early 2019. The series is currently available to watch for free on YouTube and Amazon Prime Video in the United States.

== In other media ==
On 1 October 2016, Rimba Racer Rush: Endless Race mobile game was released by Spacepup Entertainment in collaboration with Glue Studios. The game currently has 100,000+ downloads on the Google Play Store.
