= Keymon & Nani in Space Adventure =

2012 Indian animated film

Keymon & Nani In Space Adventure
- Directed by: Swarna Prasad
- Starring: Brian D'costa; Usha Uthup
- Edited by: Vinayak Raj; Venkat Reddy; Venugopal Reddy; Sarath Babu
- Production companies: Nickelodeon India; DQ Entertainment International
- Distributed by: Viacom18 Motion Pictures
- Release date: 9 November 2012
- Running time: 76 minutes
- Country: India
- Language: Hindi
- Box office: ₹525,000

Keymon & Nani In Space Adventure is a 2012 Indian animated film based on the series Keymon Ache. It was released in theatres on 9 November 2012. The character of Nani in this film was voiced by Usha Uthup.

== Plot ==
Rohan and Keymon have to go to Panaji without their parents to their maternal grandmother during their summer holidays. They quickly find her to be strict, but later become good friends with her. One day during camping night, they hear some unusual noises. Their grandmother goes to see what happened, but when she came back, she was talking and walking unusually. Keymon and Rohan soon find that their grandmother has been abducted by aliens and the grandmother who has been with them is controlled by an alien. They then embark on a journey to find their grandmother.

The alien informs them about uddibaba, an alien who is very strong and powerful who has taken over planet kya naam hai. The alien disappears after that. Next they feel extremely sorry for their'nani boss'. keymon uses his magic to make a spaceship and go to the planet kya naam hai? They go to the planet and then get arrested by the police. When they were imprisoned they meet an alien who tells them about the story of kya naam hai? He starts by saying "our planet was very good when our princess hihi haha was on a journey to marry and find captain daro mat in occasion of their wedding, the princess then releases everyone from jail. Then uddibaba conquers the empire and imprisoned everyone. Keymon then escapes from the jail and reaches the palace and help Nani boss but when they helped others they refused to go out because it was so relaxing. They also help and escape but then get stopped by soldiers and meet Uddibaba. Nani made fun of him which makes uddibaba angry. He also says he is doing this because nanis are tasty. After that Keymon says he will entertain guests and hence don't make them his food. Uddibaba agrees and then on the day of dancing they use magic during the dance and kill soldiers after which Nani defeats uddibaba's grandmother. Hence, the planet thank them.

== Release ==
The film was released theatrically in six cities, Mumbai, Pune, Delhi, Bengaluru, Gurgaon, and Ahmedabad on 9 November 2012. It was released on Netflix on 20 April 2021.

== Reception ==
The Shillong Times called it a "fun watch". They further wrote, "Animation is good if not first rate. Music is decent and voice-overs ‘cool’ in Keymon’s language. Story moves fast but the pace drops once the trio reaches the alien planet."

The film earned ₹525,000 (equivalent to ₹990,000 or US$10,000 in 2023) against a budget of ₹15 million (equivalent to ₹28 million or US$290,000 in 2023).
