= Sourav Chakraborty =

Sourav Chakraborty may refer to:

- Sourav Chakraborty (politician) (b. 1 September 1973), Indian politician
- Sourav Chakraborty (actor) (b. 11 October 1988), Indian actor, director, writer and producer
- Sourav Chakraborty (comedian), Indian actor, comedian and voice artist
