= Viacom18 Studios =

Indian film studio

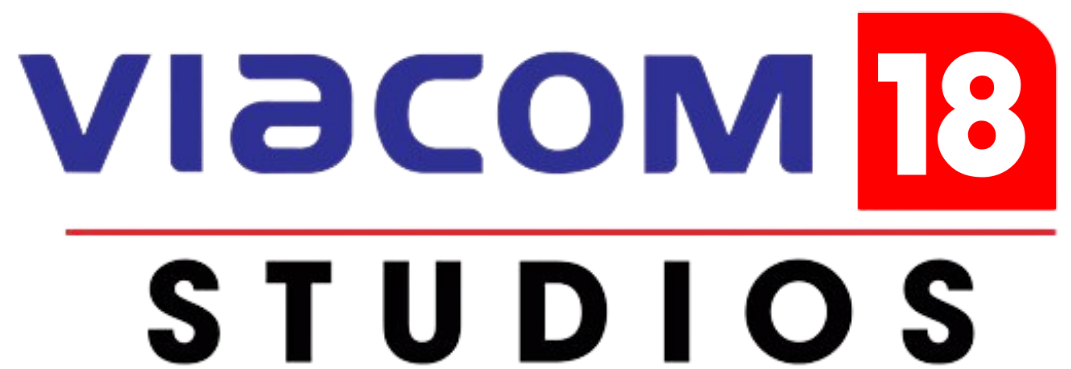
- Formerly: Indian Films; Studio 18; Viacom18 Motion Pictures
- Type: Subsidiary
- Industry: Film
- Founded: 2006; 20 years ago
- Defunct: 2025; 1 year ago
- Fate: Merged into Star Studios
- Successor: Star Studio18
- Headquarters: Mumbai, India
- Area served: Worldwide
- Key people: Ajit Andhare (COO)
- Owner: JioStar
- Subsidiaries: Tipping Point Films
- Website: Discontinued

Viacom18 Studios was an Indian film distribution and production company. It was a subsidiary of JioStar, a joint venture between Reliance Industries, Viacom18 and Disney India. Based in Mumbai, it was one of the first studio model based motion picture & content production business in India, with an operation that involves acquisition, production, syndication, marketing and worldwide distribution of full-length feature films as well as digital only films, web series, short films.

Due to Viacom being one of the partners in the company at that time, they also distribute films from Paramount Pictures in India, Bangladesh, and Sri Lanka since 2011, starting with Transformers: Dark of the Moon.

Following the merger of Viacom18 and Disney Star, the company was merged with Star Studio, Disney Star's production company, to form Star Studio18.

== Filmography ==
=== Films produced ===
Release date	Film	Director	Notes
2006	Bas Ek Pal	Onir	As Indian Films
2006	Bhagam Bhag	Priyadarshan	As Indian Films
2007	1971	Amrit Sagar	As Studio 18
2007	Kya Love Story Hai	Lovely Singh	As Studio 18
2007	Jab We Met	Imtiaz Ali	As Indian Films
2007	Welcome	Anees Bazmee	As Indian Films
2008	Halla Bol	Rajkumar Santoshi	As Indian Films
2008	Bhoothnath	Vivek Sharma	As Indian Films
2008	Singh Is Kinng	Anees Bazmee	As Indian Films
2008	Kidnap	Sanjay Gadhvi	As Indian Films
2008	Golmaal Returns	Rohit Shetty	As Indian Films
2008	Little Zizou	Sooni Taraporevala	As Indian Films and Studio 18
2008	Dil Kabaddi	Anil Sharma	As Indian Films and Studio 18
2008	Ghajini	AR Murugadoss	As Indian Films
2009	Short Kut	Neeraj Vora	As Indian Films; remake of Malayalam movie Udayananu Tharam
2009	Luck	Soham Shah	As Indian Films; adaptation of 2001 Spanish thriller film Intacto
2009	Life Partner	Rumi Jaffery	As Indian Films and Studio 18
2009	Road, Movie	Dev Benegal	As Indian Films and Studio 18
2009	Fruit and Nut	Kunal Vijaykar	As Indian Films and Studio 18
2010	It's a Wonderful Afterlife	Gurinder Chadha	As Indian Films and Studio 18
2010	Striker	Chandan Arora	As Indian Films and Studio 18
2010	Hum Tum Aur Ghost	Kabeer Kaushik	As Indian Films and Studio 18; remake of 2008 Hollywood film Ghost Town, Inspired from the Hollywood films The Sixth Sense (1999), Heart and Souls (1993)
2010	That Girl in Yellow Boots	Anurag Kashyap	
2011	Tanu Weds Manu	Aanand L. Rai	
2011	Pyaar Ka Punchnama	Luv Ranjan	
2011	Shaitan	Bejoy Nambiar	
2011	Bbuddah... Hoga Terra Baap	Puri Jagannadh	
2011	Speedy Singhs	Robert Lieberman	English film, Dubbed in Hindi language.
2011	Loot	Rajnish Raj Thakur	
2012	Players	Abbas–Mustan	Remake of 1969 British film The Italian Job
2012	Kahaani	Sujoy Ghosh	
2012	Blood Money	Vishal Mahadkar	
2012	Bittoo Boss	Supavitra Babul	
2012	Department	Ram Gopal Varma	
2012	Gangs of Wasseypur - Part 1	Anurag Kashyap	First Installment of Gangs of Wasseypur
2012	Gangs of Wasseypur - Part 2	Anurag Kashyap	Second Installment of Gangs of Wasseypur
2012	OMG – Oh My God!	Umesh Shukla	Based on the 2001 Australian film The Man Who Sued God and the storyline is based on Gujarati Stage play Kanji Virudh Kanji
2012	Aiyyaa	Sachin Kundalkar	
2012	Keymon & Nani In Space Adventure	DQ Entertainment	Animated Film
2012	Son of Sardaar	Ashwni Dhir	Remake of Telugu film Maryada Ramanna
2013	Inkaar	Sudhir Mishra	
2013	Special 26	Neeraj Pandey	Based on the 1987 Opera House heist in Mumbai, Maharashtra
2013	Saheb, Biwi Aur Gangster Returns	Tigmanshu Dhulia	Second Installment of Saheb, Biwi Aur Gangster
2013	Chasme Baddoor	David Dhawan	Remake of 1981 Bollywood film Chashme Buddoor
2013	Bombay Talkies	Karan Johar, Dibakar Banerjee, Zoya Akhtar, Anurag Kashyap	Anthology film
2013	Zapatlela 2	Mahesh Kothare	Based on the Don Mancini's Hollywood movie Child's Play. It was the first Marathi Cinema film to be shot in 3D.
2013	Bhaag Milkha Bhaag	Rakeysh Omprakash Mehra	Life of an Indian Athlete Milkha Singh
2013	Luv U Soniyo	Joe Rajan	
2013	Madras Cafe	Shoojit Sircar	Debut film of Bollywood South Indian actress Raashi Khanna
2013	Boss	Anthony D'Souza	Remake of 2010 Malayalam film Pokkiri Raja; co-produced with Cape of Good Films, Ashwin Varde Production
2013	Bhaji in Problem	Smeep Kang	Punjabi film
2013	What the Fish	Gurmeet Singh	
2014	One By Two	Devika Bhagat	
2014	The Royal Bengal Tiger	Neeraj Pandey	Based on the Chuck Palahniuk's English Novel Fight Club
2014	Queen	Vikas Bahl	
2014	Manjunath	Sandeep A.	Based on the Indian Institute of Management Lucknow graduate Shanmugam Manjunath who was killed in Lakhimpur Kheri district, Uttar Pradesh in November 2005
2014	Mary Kom	Omung Kumar	Based on the life of Indian Boxer Mary Kom.
2014	Gollu Aur Pappu	Kabir Sadanand	
2014	Mumbai Delhi Mumbai	Satish Rajwade	Remake of 2010 Marathi film Mumbai-Pune-Mumbai
2014	Margarita with a Straw	Shonali Bose	
2015	Rahasya	Manish Gupta	
2015	Dharam Sankat Mein	Fuwad Khan	Remake of 2010 British film The Infidel
2015	Gabbar Is Back	Krish Jagarlamudi	Remake of 2002 Tamil movie Ramanaa
2015	Drishyam	Nishikant Kamat	
2015	Manjhi – The Mountain Man	Ketan Mehta	Based on the life of Mountain Man Dashrath Manjhi Jointly produced by NFDC India
2015	Time Out	Rikhil Bahadur	
2015	Pyaar Ka Punchnama 2	Luv Ranjan	
2015	Black	Raja Chanda	Indo-Bangladesh film
2016	Airlift	Raja Krishna Menon	
2016	Santa Banta Pvt Ltd	Akashdeep Sahir	
2016	Budhia Singh – Born to Run	Soumendra Padhi	Based on the Life of India's Youngest Marathon Runner Budhia Singh
2016	Photocopy	Vijay Maurya	Marathi Film, co-production with Neha Rajpal Productions
2016	Motu Patlu: King of Kings	Suhas D. Kadav	Animated Film
2016	Force 2	Abhinay Deo	
2017	Rangoon	Vishal Bhardwaj	Based on the life and times of Mary Ann Evans aka Fearless Nadia
2017	Toilet: Ek Prem Katha	Shree Narayan Singh	
2017	Lucknow Central	Nikkhil Adwani	Based on the Bengali film Muktodhara
2017	Aval (The House Next Door) in Hindi	Milind Rau	Released in Tamil, Hindi languages and dubbed in Telugu as Gruham
2018	Padmaavat	Sanjay Leela Bhansali	Based on the epic poem of the same name by Malik Muhammad Jayasi
2018	Aapla Manus	Satish Rajwade	Marathi film, A film adaptation of the Marathi play Katkon Trikon by Dr Vivek Bele
2018	Manto	Nandita Das	Based on the Prominent Urdu Novelist Saadat Hasan Manto.
2018	Andhadhun	Sriram Raghavan	
2018	Jalebi: The Everlasting Taste of Love	Pushpdeep Bhardwaj	
2018	Baazaar	Gauravv K. Chawla	
2019	Bhai: Vyakti Ki Valli	Mahesh Manjrekar	Based on the life of Marathi writer and humorist Pu La Deshpande
2019	Thackeray	Abhijit Panse	Based on the life of Shiv Sena Party leader Bal Thackeray, Released in Hindi, Marathi languages
2019	Kodathi Samaksham Balan Vakeel	B. Unnikrishnan	Malayalam film
2019	Romeo Akbar Walter	Robbie Grewal	
2019	Manmadhudu 2	Rahul Ravindran	Telugu film, Sequel of 2002 film Manmadhudu, Remake of 2006 French film I Do
2019	Motichoor Chaknachoor	Debamitra Biswal	
2019	The Body	Jeethu Joseph	Remake of 2012 Spanish film The Body. It was Already remade in 2016 Tamil-Kannada film Game and Oru Melliya Kodu
2019	Thambi	Jeethu Joseph	Tamil film
2020	Shimla Mirchi	Ramesh Sippy	
2020	Kannum Kannum Kollaiyadithaal	Desingh Periyasamy	
2020	Krishna and His Leela	Ravikanth Perepu	
2021	Sarbath	Prabhakaran	Tamil film
2021	Bhramam	Ravi K. Chandran	Remake of 2018 Bollywood film Andhadhun
2022	Hey Sinamika	Brinda	Tamil film
2022	Gehraiyaan	Shakun Batra	
2022	Jugjugg Jeeyo	Raj Mehta	
2022	Shabaash Mithu	Srijit Mukherji	Based on the life of current Test and ODI captain of the India women's national cricket team, Mithali Raj
2022	Nitham Oru Vaanam	Ra. Karthik	Co-produced with Rise East Entertainment
2022	Laal Singh Chaddha	Advait Chandan	Remake of 1994 Hollywood film Forrest Gump.
2022	Drishyam 2	Abhishek Pathak	Second part of Drishyam film
2022	Govinda Naam Mera	Shashank Khaitan	Co-produced with Dharma Productions
2023	Zwigato	Nandita Das	
2023	Rocky Aur Rani Kii Prem Kahaani	Karan Johar	
2023	OMG 2	Amit Rai	
2023	Suspect	Samir Karnik	
2023	Dhak Dhak	Tarun Dudeja	
2023	Shastry Viruddh Shastry	Nandita Roy; Shiboprosad Mukherjee	
2024	Fighter	Siddharth Anand	Also distributor
2024	Jigra	Vasan Bala	
2025	Logout	Amit Golani	

=== Films distributed ===
Year	Film	Director	Production Company	Notes
2007	Kya Love Story Hai	Lovely Singh	VR Entertainers; Adlabs Films	As Studio 18
2007	Jab We Met	Imtiaz Ali	Shree Ashtavinayak Cine Vision	As Indian Films
2007	Welcome	Anees Bazmee	UTV Motion Pictures; Base Industries Group	As Indian Films
2008	Bhoothnath	Vivek Sharma	Eros International; B.R. Films	As Indian Films
2008	Singh Is Kinng	Anees Bazmee	Big Pictures; Hari Om Entertainment; Blockbuster Movie Entertainers; Adlabs Films	As Indian Films
2008	Kidnap	Sanjay Gadhvi	Shree Ashtavinayak Cine Vision	As Indian Films
2008	Golmaal Returns	Rohit Shetty	Shree Ashtavinayak Cine Vision	As Indian Films
2008	Little Zizou	Sooni Taraporevala		As Indian Films and Studio 18
2008	Dil Kabaddi	Anil Sharma	Paramhans Creations	As Indian Films and Studio 18
2009	Short Kut	Neeraj Vora	Anil Kapoor Film Company	As Indian Films
2009	Luck	Soham Shah	Shree Ashtavinayak Cine Vision	As Indian Films
2009	Life Partner	Rumi Jaffery	Burmawala Bros	As Indian Films and Studio 18
2009	Road, Movie	Dev Benegal	August Entertainment	As Indian Films and Studio 18
2010	It's a Wonderful Afterlife	Gurinder Chadha	Icon Productions; Bend It Films	As Indian Films and Studio 18
2010	Striker	Chandan Arora	Makefilms	As Indian Films and Studio 18
2010	Hum Tum Aur Ghost	Kabeer Kaushik	Shooting Star Films	As Indian Films and Studio 18
2011	Tanu Weds Manu	Aanand L. Rai	Soundrya Production	
2011	Shaitan	Bejoy Nambiar	Tipping Point Films, Anurag Kashyap Films, Getaway Films	
2011	Keymon & Nani in Space Adventure	Swarna Prasad	Nickelodeon India, DQ Entertainment International	
2011	Loot	Rajnish Raj Thakur	Popcorn Motion Pictures	
2012	Players	Abbas–Mustan	Paramount Pictures, Viacom18 Motion Pictures	
2012	Gangs of Wasseypur – Part 2	Anurag Kashyap	AKFPL	Sequel of Gangs of Wasseypur
2013	Luv U Soniyo	Joe Rajan	Viacom18 Motion Pictures	
2014	Anaamika	Sekhar Kammula	Endemol India	
2015	Drishyam	Nishikant Kamat	Viacom18 Motion Pictures, Panorama Studios	
2015	Pyaar Ka Punchnama 2	Luv Ranjan	Viacom18 Motion Pictures, Luv Films	Second installment of Pyaar Ka Punchnama
2015	Nanak Shah Fakir	Sartaj Singh Pannu	Gurbani Media	Punjabi film
2016	Force 2	Abhinay Deo	Viacom18 Motion Pictures, JA Entertainment, Sunshine Pictures	Second installment of Force
2016	Gods of Egypt	Alex Proyas	Summit Entertainment, Mystery Clock Cinema	Indian theatrical distribution only
2016	Nerve	Henry Joost, Ariel Schulman	Lionsgate, Allison Shearmur Productions	Indian theatrical distribution only
2016	Deepwater Horizon	Peter Berg	Summit Entertainment, Participant Media, Di Bonaventura Pictures, Closest to the Hole Productions, Leverage	Indian theatrical distribution only
2016	La La Land	Damien Chazelle	Summit Entertainment	Indian theatrical distribution only
2016	Patriots Day	Peter Berg	Lionsgate, CBS Films, Bluegrass Films, Closest to the Hole Productions	Indian theatrical distribution only
2017	Power Rangers	Dean Israelite	Lionsgate, SCG Films, Temple Hill Entertainment	Indian theatrical distribution only
2018	Andhadhun	Sriram Raghavan	Viacom18 Motion Pictures, Matchbox Pictures	
2018	Jalebi: The Everlasting Taste of Love	Pushpdeep Bhardwaj	Vishesh Films	Remake of 2016 Bengali film Praktan
2022	Gangubai Kathiawadi	Sanjay Leela Bhansali	Pen India Limited, Bhansali Productions	International distribution only; distributed by Pen Marudhar Cine Entertainment in India
2022	Cobra	R. Ajay Gnanamuthu	Viacom18 Studios	Tamil Film
2022	Jugjugg Jeeyo	Raj Mehta	Dharma Productions	
2022	Doctor G	Anubhti Kashyap	Junglee Pictures	International distribution only; distributed by Anand Pandit Motion Pictures in India
2024	Jigra	Vasan Bala	Dharma Productions, Eternal Sunshine Productions	

=== Web series ===
Year	Title	Language	Network	Notes	Ref(s)
2020	Jamtara – Sabka Number Ayega	Hindi	Netflix		
2020	Taj Mahal 1989	Hindi	Netflix		
2020	She	Hindi	Netflix		
2021	Ray	Hindi	Netflix		
2023	Kaalkoot	Hindi	JioCinema		
2024	Murder In Mahim	Hindi	JioCinema		
2024	Gaanth Chapter 1: Jamnaa Paar	Hindi	JioCinema		
