= Chikoo Aur Bunty =

Indian animated television series

- Genre: Comedy; Action; Slapstick comedy
- Created by: Chikoo Aur Bunty
- Written by: Gaurav Malani; Seema Malani; Gulzar (lyrics)
- Directed by: Vishwajeet Shinde
- Voices of: See below
- Country of origin: India
- Original languages: Hindi; Tamil; Bengali; Telugu; Marathi; Malayalam; Kannada; English; Urdu
- No. of seasons: 3
- No. of episodes: 277+

Production
- Running time: 11–15 minutes
- Production company: Hitech Studio

Original release
- Network: Nickelodeon
- Release: 18 October 2021 – present

Chikoo Aur Bunty is an Indian animated television series, produced by Hitech Studio, which airs on Nickelodeon. The series premiered on 18 October 2021.

The show typically follows a format of two 11–13 minute-long independent segments per episode. The series showcases the story of two siblings named Chikoo and Bunty, who compete for affection and goodies while avoiding being reprimanded by their parents. The lyrics of the show's title song was written by poet and lyricist Gulzar.

== Synopsis ==
Chikoo Aur Bunty is a comedy series focused on the relationship between siblings. It revolves around the rivalry between two teenage brothers Chikoo and Bunty, competing for affection, goodies, and often escaping the parents' attention, mainly when they create mayhem at home, neighbourhood, school, or playground.

== Episode List ==
=== Season 1 ===
| Episode No. | Title |
|---|---|
| Ep 1 | Chutti Ho Gayi |
| Ep 2 | Barfi Ka Bath |
| Ep 3 | Butler Bhai |
| Ep 4 | Guest Room |
| Ep 5 | Sunday Special |
| Ep 6 | Lambu Lambuer |
| Ep 7 | Hume Darr Nahi Lagta |
| Ep 8 | Rang Bares |
| Ep 9 | Pigeon Party |
| Ep 10 | Marksheet Ki Hera Pheri |
| Ep 11 | Car Ya Bike |
| Ep 12 | Mummy Naraaz Hai |
| Ep 13 | Party Ho Rahi Hai |
| Ep 14 | Happy Anniversary |
| Ep 15 | Mouse Trap |
| Ep 16 | Lock Kiya Jaye |
| Ep 17 | Bunty Ka Dance Video |
| Ep 18 | Papa Se Peecha Chudao |
| Ep 19 | Bunty Ki Baji Ghanti |
| Ep 20 | Dog Not Allowed |
| Ep 21 | War On Pizza |
| Ep 22 | Jhumka Gira Re |
| Ep 23 | Not A Cakewalk |
| Ep 24 | Dadaji Se Bachke |
| Ep 25 | Kissa Kursi Ka |
| Ep 26 | Family Photograph |
| Ep 27 | Yoga Se Hi Hoga |
| Ep 28 | Daadi Cool! |
| Ep 29 | Surprise Party Ka Chakkar |
| Ep 30 | Chikoo Ka Wicket Down |
| Ep 31 | Nani Yaad Agayi |
| Ep 32 | Gulab Jamun Gayaab |
| Ep 33 | Kaun Banega Champu |
| Ep 34 | Dashing Dadaji |
| Ep 35 | Nani Ka Shopping Coupon |
| Ep 36 | Andaz Apna Apna |
| Ep 37 | Bhaago Boss Aaya |
| Ep 38 | Dil Garden Garden |
| Ep 39 | Rang Barse |
| Ep 40 | Inspector Barfi |
| Ep 41 | Muh Khulwake Rahunga |
| Ep 42 | Earbuds Wali Biryani |
| Ep 43 | Khel Khatam |
| Ep 44 | Dadaji Ke Kharrate |
| Ep 45 | Nanaji Sweet Nanaji |
| Ep 46 | Bhai Bhai |
| Ep 47 | Bat Bigad Gayi |
| Ep 48 | Bhool Gaya Sab Kuch |
| Ep 49 | Barfi Kahan Hain |
| Ep 50 | Tere Mere Beach Mein |
| Ep 51 | Saree Ke Chakkar |
| Ep 52 | Mummy Ka Holiday |
| Ep 53 | Maska Maar Ke |
| Ep 54 | Chor Machaye Shor |
| Ep 55 | Sign It |
| Ep 56 | Bandarchaap |
| Ep 57 | Raddi Mein Gaya |
| Ep 58 | Nahi Nahane Ka Bahana |
| Ep 59 | Pet Problem |
| Ep 60 | Mummy Cool |
| Ep 61 | Barfi Ka Mood Off |
| Ep 62 | Favourite Beta Kaun |
| Ep 63 | Baby O Baby |
| Ep 64 | No Return |
| Ep 65 | Role Reversal |
| Ep 66 | Society Ka Function |
| Ep 67 | Party Problem |
| Ep 68 | Bhagam Bhaag |
| Ep 69 | Papa Sleep Walking |
| Ep 70 | Jaagte Raho |
| Ep 71 | Toot Gaya |
| Ep 72 | Pocket Money |
| Ep 73 | Under Surveillance |
| Ep 74 | Teacher Ji Ghar Aaya |
| Ep 75 | Mission Mobile |
| Ep 76 | Jaasoos Bunty |
| Ep 77 | Practical Papa |
| Ep 78 | Kissa Cupboard Ka |
| Ep 79 | Bura Na Mano Holi Hain |
| Ep 80 | Batti Gul |
| Ep 81 | Kuch Khatti Kuch Teekhi |
| Ep 82 | Dushman Ka Dushman |
| Ep 83 | Treasure Hunt |
| Ep 84 | Chikoo Bunty Ka Viral Video |
| Ep 85 | Saari Problems Saari Ki |
| Ep 86 | Mummy Hartal |
| Ep 87 | Meri Loot |
| Ep 88 | Pehle Tum Pehle Tum |
| Ep 89 | Scream For Ice-Cream |
| Ep 90 | Bua Ka Bhuchal |
| Ep 91 | Kiska Patta Khulega |
| Ep 92 | Jo Bolega Woh Loser |
| Ep 93 | Dance Dekhe Yaa Cricket |
| Ep 94 | Hostel Ka Chakkar |
| Ep 95 | Front Seat |
| Ep 96 | Cycle Recycle |
| Ep 97 | Gullak Phod Dunga |
| Ep 98 | Tutu Main Main |
| Ep 99 | The Case Of Suitcase |
| Ep 100 | Baarish Barsa Bunty Tarsa |
| Ep 101 | Ab Goli Kha |
| Ep 102 | Hypnosis Ka Hungama |
| Ep 103 | Chaat Ka Chaanta |
| Ep 104 | Bedtime Stories |

=== Season 2 ===
| Episode No. | Title |
|---|---|
| Ep 105 | Phirkee Le Li |
| Ep 106 | Boarding school |
| Ep 107 | Bunty Ki Bhook Hadtaal |
| Ep 108 | Menhadi Wale Hath |
| Ep 109 | Night out |
| Ep 110 | School Bunk |
| Ep 111 | Mummy Ka Business |
| Ep 112 | Doodh Se Duri |
| Ep 113 | Madan Mohan Ka Bhaichaara |
| Ep 114 | Mobile Lessons |
| Ep 115 | Topi Pehna Diya |
| Ep 116 | Mela Ka Jhamela |
| Ep 117 | Emergency Ptm |
| Ep 118 | Gift Nahi Dunga |
| Ep 119 | Bijli Bachao |
| Ep 120 | Falana Dhimkana |
| Ep 121 | Aam ki khaas jung |
| Ep 122 | Party Tho Abhi Baki Hai |
| Ep 123 | Barfi Kiska Pet Banega |
| Ep 124 | Muh Mat Dikhana |
| Ep 125 | Do Bucket Ki Ek Kahani |
| Ep 126 | New Year Party Ka Dhindhora |
| Ep 127 | Dhulaai Ho Gayi |
| Ep 128 | TV band |
| Ep 129 | Nahane ka bahana |
| Ep 130 | Hathkadi ki kadi |
| Ep 131 | Khel khel main |
| Ep 132 | Jo tera hai wo mera hai |
| Ep 133 | Roll baby roll |
| Ep 134 | Jungle safari |
| Ep 135 | Adventurous anniversary |
| Ep 136 | Return gift ka halla |
| Ep 137 | Machchli phas gaye |
| Ep 138 | Museebat Rang Laayi |
| Ep 139 | Resort mein rukho |
| Ep 140 | Liberal papa |
| Ep 141 | Tu kya banega |
| Ep 142 | No agreement for tent |
| Ep 143 | Mummy ka missing mobile |
| Ep 144 | Idli hi mili |
| Ep 145 | Geeta Masi Ka Gift |
| Ep 146 | Mummy ka driving test |
| Ep 147 | Bunty Bana Batsman |
| Ep 148 | Bunty Ka Birthday Surprise |
| Ep 149 | Dada Ji Ki Birthday Party |
| Ep 150 | Divide And Rule |
| Ep 151 | Favourite Bhaiyya Kaun |
| Ep 152 | Gas Problem |
| Ep 153 | Kiska Number Lagega |
| Ep 154 | Nanaji Ka Game |
| Ep 155 | On schedule |
| Ep 156 | Society Election |
| Ep 157 | Tareef karegi teacher |
| Ep 158 | Trekking To Resort |
| Ep 159 | Virat Vs Ice Cream |
| Ep 160 | Dadaji Ki Shabashi |
| Ep 161 | Bekar Ka Tension |
| Ep 162 | Chakkar Karate Ka |
| Ep 163 | Cycle Chor |
| Ep 164 | Lights Ki Fight |
| Ep 165 | Family fun time |
| Ep 166 | Mood Kharab Hai |
| Ep 167 | Museum Mein Masti |
| Ep 168 | Raat bhar padhai |
| Ep 169 | Sewa Ka Mewa |
| Ep 170 | Bus Ho Gaya |
| Ep 171 | Raat Akeli Hai |
| Ep 172 | Skateboards ke stunts |
| Ep 173 | Papa Ka Transfer |
| Ep 174 | Kaun Banega Superstar |
| Ep 175 | Chikoo Ka Birthday Bouncer |
| Ep 176 | Chikoo Badal Gaya |
| Ep 177 | Laptop Ki Ladaai |
| Ep 178 | Cricket Turf Ya Dance Studio |
| Ep 179 | Do Not Disturb |
| Ep 180 | Judwe Jacket Ka Jhol |
| Ep 181 | Bunty Ki Dance Class |
| Ep 182 | Family Dieting |
| Ep 183 | Bal Bal Bache |
| Ep 184 | Tiffin Ka Tanta |
| Ep 185 | Nachna Mana Hain |
| Ep 186 | Bunty Ki Identity |
| Ep 187 | Story Shirt Ki |
| Ep 188 | Kaun Jayega Dadi Ke Ghar |
| Ep 189 | Kitty Party Ki Kit-Pit |
| Ep 190 | Pizza Vs Bhajiya |
| Ep 191 | Meow Meow |
| Ep 192 | Band Bajegi Friendship Ki |
| Ep 193 | Papa Ki Chutti |
| Ep 194 | Jaago Sone Walo |
| Ep 195 | Thanda Thanda Paani |
| Ep 196 | Kaun Jeetega Bumper Prize |
| Ep 197 | Pasta V/S Noodles |
| Ep 198 | Ball Se Behaal |
| Ep 199 | Darpok Kaun Hai |
| Ep 200 | Book Set Ki Setting |
| Ep 201 | Project Do Pizza Lo |
| Ep 202 | Badminton Champion |
| Ep 203 | Kheech Meri Photo |
| Ep 204 | Girgit Ki Khitpit |
| Ep 205 | Ghoomte Phirte |
| Ep 206 | Papa Ka Top Secret |
| Ep 207 | Thanda Thanda Pool Pool |
| Ep 208 | Office Office |
| Ep 209 | Board Crack Kiya |
| Ep 210 | Sketch Ki Kich Kich |
| Ep 211 | Cricket Nahi Khelunga |
| Ep 212 | Machan Ghar |

=== Season 3 ===
| Episode No. | Title |
|---|---|
| Ep 213 | Bunty Bana Superstar |
| Ep 214 | Dahi Handi |
| Ep 215 | Fitness Ka Keeda |
| Ep 216 | Cupcake Chor Kaun |
| Ep 217 | School Jane Nahi Dunga |
| Ep 218 | Family Melodrama |
| Ep 219 | Game Over |
| Ep 220 | Happy Diwali |
| Ep 221 | Mere Liye Naach |
| Ep 222 | Kabadd Khali Karo |
| Ep 223 | Dad Vs Dadaji Ka Car |
| Ep 224 | Raat Ki Baat |
| Ep 225 | Mother's Day Bakeout |
| Ep 226 | Timmy Bhaiyya Sabse Cool |
| Ep 227 | Chikoo Bunty In Tribal Land |
| Ep 228 | Dance Bunty Dance |
| Ep 229 | Bunty Ki Nautanki |
| Ep 230 | Yummy In My Tummy |
| Ep 231 | Bunty Bana Rapper |
| Ep 232 | Nani Ki party |
| Ep 233 | Chikoo Ka Naya Style |
| Ep 234 | Dil Toot Gaya |
| Ep 235 | Dadaji Cool |
| Ep 236 | Scooter Ka Chakker |
| Ep 237 | Picture Abhi Baaki Hain |
| Ep 238 | Darwaja Band Karo |
| Ep 239 | Christmas Cake Ka Chakkar |
| Ep 240 | Kathal Ka Hal |
| Ep 241 | Naiyaa Doob Gayi |
| Ep 242 | AC Ki Taise |
| Ep 243 | Videogame Ka Next Level |
| Ep 244 | Gadbad Golf Ki |
| Ep 245 | Mummy, Masi Aur Musical Chairs |
| Ep 246 | Chor Nikal Ke Bhaaga |
| Ep 247 | Pol Khol Dunga |
| Ep 248 | Phool Or Kantae |
| Ep 249 | Photo Fiasco! |
| Ep 250 | Baal Ka Bawal |
| Ep 251 | Grandpa's Gift |
| Ep 252 | Cookie Sale Ka Khel |
| Ep 253 | Shell Ka Khel |
| Ep 254 | Society Ka Shaitan |
| Ep 255 | Party Ka Punchnama |
| Ep 256 | Nana vs Naani |
| Ep 257 | Chal Mere Barfi |
| Ep 258 | The Batra Bros |
| Ep 259 | Barfi Meets Kulfi |
| Ep 260 | Picnic Cancel |
| Ep 261 | Batra Karate Class |
| Ep 262 | Chhaata Kaha Tha |
| Ep 263 | Chikoo Bana Chipkoo |
| Ep 264 | Bahar Baarish Ho Rahi Hai |
| Ep 265 | Mobile Mana Hai |
| Ep 266 | Chakkar Cycle Ka |
| Ep 267 | Papad Ka Peheradar |
| Ep 268 | Cab Carnama |
| Ep 269 | Mummy Ka Master Piece |
| Ep 270 | Skater Kaun |
| Ep 271 | Games Night |
| Ep 272 | Museebat Ka Pahad |
| Ep 273 | Tension Tiffin Ka |
| Ep 274 | Punishment Pakda Gaya |
| Ep 275 | Ek Se Badhkar Ek |
| Ep 276 | Kya Pak Raha Hai |
| Ep 277 | The Missing Trophy |

== Movie List ==
| Sequence No. | Title |
|---|---|
| Movie 1 | Best Siblings Kaun |
| Movie 2 | Haunted House |
| Movie 3 | Bhagam Bhaag Express |
| Movie 4 | Ultimate Dream Chase |
| Movie 5 | Siblings Not Allowed |
| Movie 6 | Raja Beta Kaun |
| Movie 7 | The Detective Bross |
| Movie 8 | Kushti Ki Jung |

== Characters ==
- Chikoo Batra (Voiced by Shaily Dubey): He is a 11 year old boy who is the older brother of Bunty. He is calm and relaxed, optimistic, friendly, reliable, witty, fun-loving and a quick thinker. His best friend is Vicky and normal friend is Sonu.
- Bunty Batra (Voices by Khushboo Atre): He is the 10 year old younger brother of Chikoo. He is a cheerful ball of energy, crafty, attention-seeking, provocative, sarcastic, outgoing, quick learner, fast on his feet, has an entrepreneurial spirit and is a jack of all trades. His best friend is Twinkle and normal friend is Fifi.
- Rajeev Batra (Voiced by Shanoor Mirza): The Boys' dad. He is a rational, perpetually tired, non-interfering, practical, naïve and humble father.
- Megha Batra (Voiced by Meghana Erande Joshi): The Boys' mom. She is cute, loving, anxious, borderline obsessive, sensible and straightforward. She is constantly finding ways to motivate her boys to do well in life. She is not as easy to fool as the father.
- Barfi: He is the family's pet dog, who is playful, intelligent and quick-learner. Barfi is not even remotely as ferocious as he looks. He loves to eat bread and butter and he hates to cats.
- Dadaji (Mr. Batra) (Voiced by Anita Dokania): He is a disciplinarian who believes in living by a schedule.
- Dadi (Mrs. Batra) (Voiced by Manoj Pandey): She is quite the opposite of Dada. She supports the boys' extracurricular activities and believes there are alternate career paths that can be successful.
- Nani (Voiced by Mahendra Bhatnagar): She is maternal grandmother of the Boys. She is thrifty.
- Nanaji (Voiced by Rupa Bhimani): He is maternal Grandfather of the boys. He is so playful and happy with Chikoo and Bunty.
- Vicky Sharma (Voiced by Sabina Malik Mausam): He is a 11 years old youngest boy in friends, school head boy class topper and Chikoo's best friend.He is a calm, strong, friendly, soft-spoken, deep thinker, aggressive and playful kid.
- Sonu Ghoshla (Voiced by Shreya Ghoshal): He is a 11 year old second youngest boy in friends and he is also Dhindora uncle's nephew.
- Mr. Ghoshla: He is the father of Sonu Ghoshla
- Mrs. Ghoshla: She is the mother of Sonu Ghoshla
- Twinkle Singhania (Voiced by Katrina Kaif): Bunty's best friend.
- Dhindora: He is chairman of the society.
- Mr Singhania: He is announcer of model town and He is the dad of Twinkle and Tara.
- Mrs.Meenakshi Singhania: She is an English teacher in Model City Public school, class teacher of Tara's class and mother of twinkle and tara She is also a wife of mr singhania. She wears a pink suit with blue border and blue pants.
- Kitty: Dhindora's pet cat.
- Geeta Masi ( Voiced by Roop Thakkar): Megha's younger sister and The Boys' aunt.
- Munna: Geeta's son and The Boys' younger cousin.
- Bachha Bhopali: He is the autorickshaw driver.
- Tutu Tiger (Voiced by rohan Jadhav) : He is the rival of Chikoo.
- Pablu: He is the sidekick of Tutu Tiger and rival of Vicky and Sonu.
- Bablu: He is the sidekick of Tutu Tiger and rival of Vicky and Sonu.
- Malvinder: He is the shopkeeper of the model town shop.
- Mr. Modkar (Voiced by Sanchit Wartak): He is the boss of Rajeev.
- Madan (Voiced by Aastha Gill) He is a 11 year old second oldest boy. He is older brother of Mohan.
- Mohan (Voiced by Kareena Kapoor): He is a 10 years old second youngest boy. He is younger brother of Madan.
- Kusum (Voiced by Deepika Padukone): She is mother of madan and mohan.
- Bhalla Verma: He is friend of dadaji(Mr. Batra).
- Tara Singhania (Voiced by Alia Bhatt): 11 years old , Twinkle's older sister, Head girl of the school.
- Fifi Sharma ( Voiced by Kangana Ranaut): He is a 10 years old, Vicky's younger brother and Bunty's normal friend. He is also a topper of Class 6th
- Kunwar Samar Pratap Singh: He is a 6 year old boy. He is a friend of Bunty.
- Caretaker: He is unnamed caretaker of Samar.
- Akshita Sharma: Tara's best friend and Vicky's cousin sister.
- Monika Bhatt: Tara's normal friend.
- Mrs Sharma: She is the mother of Vicky and Fifi and aunt of Akshita.
- Mr Sharma: He is the father of Vicky and Fifi .He is also the husband of Mrs Sharma.
- Pooja Handa Mam: She is the school co-ordinator of Chikoo and Bunty's school and college friend of Megha Batra.
- Chitrolekha Aunt (Chipku Aunt): She is the aunt of Megha Batra.
- Cheenu: She is the granddaughter of Chitrolekha Aunt.
- Nathu Khera: He appeared in the 4th movie and he abducted Chikoo then Bunty.
- Momo Khera: She is the Daughter of Nathu Khera.
- Chintu (Chameleon):It is a chameleon and Vicky's pet chameleon
- ID Kumar: He is the ID checker officer.
- Minku Mishra: He appeared in the fifth movie.
- Pinku Mishra: He appeared in the fifth movie. He is the elder brother of Minku Mishra.
- Banku Batra: She is the younger cousin of Chikoo Bunty and Megha Batra 's niece.
- Mintu: Geeta Aunt' s Pet chameleon.
- Milan Babu: He is the TC of chuk chuk express.
- Chintamoni Sir: He is the orderer of the Summer Camp. He appeared in the 5th movie.
- Mr Barasingha: He is the manager of Barasingha Resort.
- Timmy: He is older friend of Chikoo and Bunty.
