= Nickelodeon (Indian TV channel) =

Indian television channel counterpart of Nickelodeon

- Logo used since 2024
- Country: India
- Broadcast area: India; Bangladesh; Nepal; Sri Lanka

Programming
- Languages: Hindi; Kannada; Telugu; Tamil; Malayalam; Bengali; Marathi
- Picture format: 1080p HDTV

Ownership
- Owner: JioStar (branding licensed from Skydance EMEA)
- Parent: Nickelodeon Group
- Sister channels: Prominent List: Cartoon Network; Disney Channel; Hungama TV; Pogo TV; Discovery Kids; Nickelodeon Sonic

History
- Launched: 16 October 1999; 27 years ago (SD) 5 December 2015; 10 years ago (HD)
- Closed: 15 June 2026; 5 months ago (Nickelodeon HD+)

Links
- Website: www.nickindia.com

Nickelodeon, or simply Nick, is an Indian children's pay-TV channel based in Mumbai, Maharashtra, India. The local equivalent of the original U.S. network, it is owned by JioStar, a joint venture between Disney India and Reliance Industries, under license from Skydance EMEA. Despite using the "Nickelodeon" branding, it does not air any content from the original channel as part of a localisation strategy since the 2010s. As of October 2020, Nickelodeon is the most-watched children's TV channel in India.

== History ==
Logo used from 2004 to 2010

Nickelodeon was launched in India on 16 October 1999. Zee TV was in charge of distributing the channel to cable TV operators, in a deal made with Viacom. Zee TV also launched a Nickelodeon-branded programming block on its main channel as part of a distribution deal between Viacom International and Zee Entertainment Enterprises. It was replaced by the Cartoon Network block in 2002.

In 2004, Viacom revamped Nickelodeon in India to increase its viewership, including branding the channel just as Nick, creating local programs and launching a Hindi audio track.

On 23 November 2006, Nickelodeon India ceased to be distributed in Pakistan and was replaced with a dedicated local version of Nickelodeon in that country.

Viacom signed a programming deal with Sun TV Network in 2007 according to which Nickelodeon shows will air on Chutti TV dubbed in Tamil and Telugu. This deal was later cancelled when Nickelodeon decided to add Tamil and Telugu audio tracks to their own channel.

In 2007, the joint venture between Viacom and TV18 called Viacom18 was formed, and three channels MTV (music), Nick India and VH1 became part of the new company.

Shortened version and former logo until 2024

Nickelodeon Wordmark logo since 2009, given the slight vermillion tint in 2017

On 25 June 2010, Nick India was rebranded, using the newly-launched logo used in the U.S. It was the last major market to undergo this makeover. In December 2011, Viacom 18 launched a new channel called Sonic. Originally, the channel was focused on action and adventure before shifting their focus to comedy in 2016.

Viacom18 Motion Pictures distributed Keymon Ache & Nani in Space Adventure, a film based on the Nickelodeon India series Keymon Ache in 2012. Another theatrical film, Motu Patlu: King Of Kings from the Motu Patlu franchise was released in Hindi and Tamil on 14 October 2016.

Nick Jr. was launched in late 2012 after being spun off from the main channel. As the main channel did not air any live-action shows, these shows aired on TeenNick, which was aired in the evenings on Nick Jr. until 1 February 2017, when it was discontinued.

In 2013, the channel hosted its first localised Kids Choice Awards.

On 5 December 2015, Viacom18 launched Nickelodeon HD+, the first children's channel in High Definition in India. It originates a different schedule than the main network, including formerly unaired international programming such as The Legend of Korra.

In March 2016, Viacom18 launched a Nick-themed programming block named "Nick Hour" on their free-to-air channel Colors Rishtey. The programming consists of shows such as Motu Patlu, Pakdam Pakdai, The Jungle Book, Go, Diego, Go!, Keymon Ache and Chhoti Anandi (Colors TV series).

Nick India replaced the English audio track with the Kannada audio track on 1 September 2018 along with Nickelodeon Sonic. Four additional language tracks in Marathi, Bengali, Gujarati and Malayalam were added in 2019.

Nick India announced its first animated co-production with Nickelodeon International titled The Twisted Timeline of Sammy & Raj, which first premiered internationally in late 2022. It premiered in India on 15 October 2023.

On 24 January 2022, in association with Nickelodeon India, Colors Tamil launched the "Nick Neram" block, airing Rudra: Boom Chik Chik Boom and Golmaal Jr..

On 15 April 2024, the channel, along with its spin-off channel Nick Jr., started to use the New Splat rebrand being used internationally. Unlike most Nickelodeon feeds utilising the Nickelodeon logo, the channel retained its on-air name as Nick.

In June 2026, Nickelodeon HD+ was replaced with an HD simulcast of the regular Nick channel in India, with programming omitted from broadcast due to the transition being available to stream on JioHotstar.

== Programming ==
In the channel's early years of broadcasting it aired mostly original programs from the U.S. version of the channel, such as Rugrats, Aaahh!!! Real Monsters, As Told by Ginger, Rocket Power, The Wild Thornberrys, The Adventures of Jimmy Neutron: Boy Genius, Rocko's Modern Life, The Angry Beavers, CatDog, Hey Arnold!, The Fairly OddParents, SpongeBob SquarePants, Danny Phantom, Avatar: The Last Airbender, along live-action shows such as Kenan & Kel, Drake & Josh, Clarissa Explains It All, Legends of the Hidden Temple, and others.

After the success of U.S. Nickelodeon's game shows, Nick India produced two local game shows, Dum Dama Dum and Gilli Gilli Gappa. They launched J Bole Toh Jadoo, a spin-off series of 2003's Koi... Mil Gaya. The series premiered on 14 November 2004 on Children's Day.

In 2006, Nick India started acquiring Japanese anime such as Ninja Hattori, Perman and Mighty Cat Masked Niyander. Due to its underperformance of original series content, the channel started to rely more on third-party programming and focused on animated content only. Newer live-action shows such as iCarly were not aired until the launch of TeenNick in 2012 and some ongoing Nickelodeon animated shows at that time such as The Fairly OddParents were permanently removed from the channel. Other shows such as Tak and the Power of Juju and DreamWorks' The Penguins of Madagascar premiered in later years.

Nick started airing Colors' show Jai Shri Krishna in 2009. The show was re-edited and customised for a younger audience. They also acquired Little Krishna, an animated series produced by BIG Animation India and The Indian Heritage Foundation in May 2009. Also, in 2009 the channel started acquiring the French series Oggy and the Cockroaches.

In 2011, Nickelodeon India started producing local animated shows, starting with Keymon Ache and a theatrical film based on the series. Motu Patlu premiered in 2012, and was followed by more local animated series such as Pakdam Pakdai in 2013 (which later moved to Nickelodeon Sonic), Shiva in 2015, Gattu Battu in 2017, Rudra in 2018, Ting Tong in 2020 and Chikoo aur Bunty in 2021. The original shows from the U.S. network migrated to Nickelodeon HD+ in 2015.

== Sister channels ==
=== Nick HD+ ===
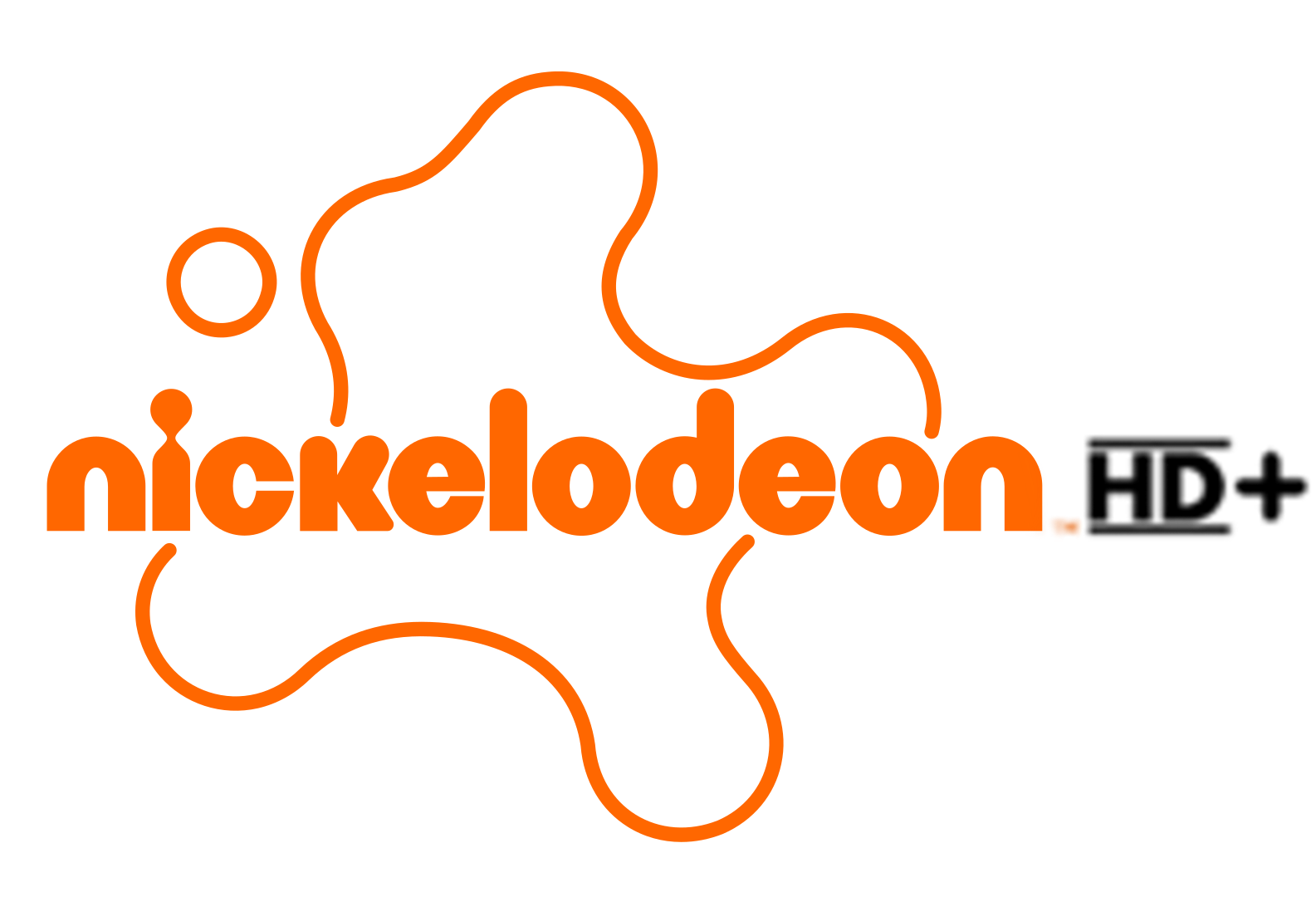
Nickelodeon HD+ final logo, used from 2024 to 2026

Nick HD+ (also known as Nickelodeon HD+) launched on 5 December 2015 in English and Hindi audio feeds. It is the high-definition counterpart of Nickelodeon India. Upon its launch, it was the first children's TV channel in high definition in India. As of 15 June 2026, Nickelodeon HD+ stopped airing U.S. Nickelodeon shows and is now a simulcast of Nick SD with the same schedule. The channel only broadcasts in Hindi

=== Nick Jr. ===
Before the launch of the channel, Nick Jr. (also known as Nickelodeon Jr.) was started as a block on Nickelodeon at morning times which broadcast shows for little kids such as Dora the Explorer, Go Diego Go, etc. On 21 November 2012, Viacom18 launched TeenNick and Nick Jr. as a single channel in which Nick Jr. airs in the daytime while TeenNick aired at night. However, TeenNick was discontinued on 1 February 2017, which made Nick Jr. a 24-hour channel. The block on Nickelodeon was discontinued in 2018.

=== Sonic ===
Nickelodeon's spin-off Sonic was launched on 20 December 2011, focusing on action and adventure (later humour currently), but aimed at preteens. In 2016, the channel changed strategy to attract younger audiences, including producing local original content for the channel.

== See also ==
- Sonic
- Disney Junior
