= Vivek Sharma =

Indian filmmaker (born 1969)

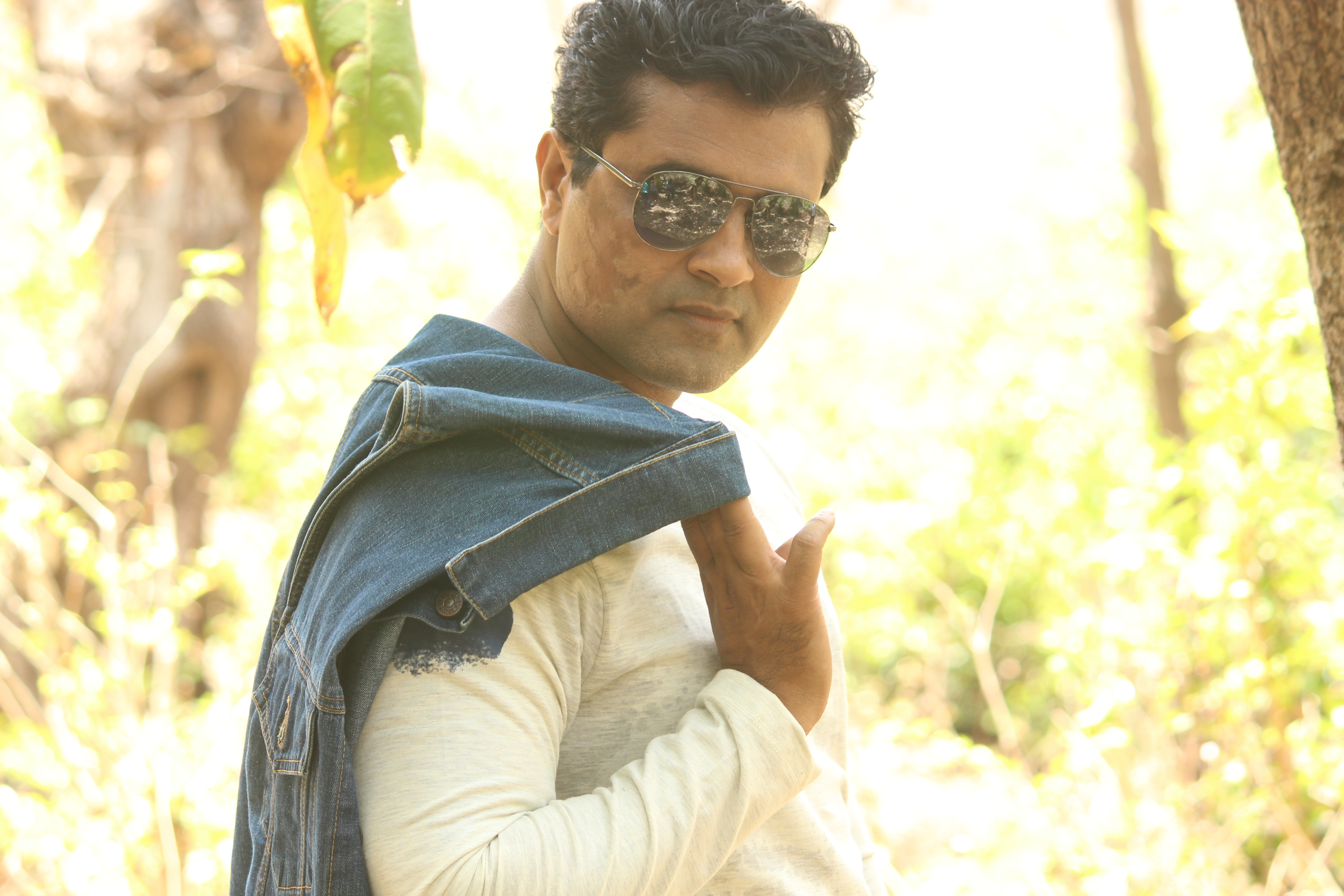
- Vivek Sharma in 2021
- Born: 27 August 1969 (age 56); Jabalpur, Madhya Pradesh, India
- Occupations: Director, script-writer

Vivek Sharma is an Indian filmmaker. He became recognised for his work when Amitabh Bachchan himself agreed to work with his directorial debut Bhoothnath.

== Early life ==
Vivek Sharma was born in a Brahmin family in Jabalpur, Madhya Pradesh, India. He completed his Master Of Science in Physics and topped the Computer Branch. His inclination towards Cinema and writing was inborn and he aspired to become a filmmaker.

== Career ==
In 1992 Vivek Sharma shifted to his dream city Mumbai and joined Mr. Mahesh Bhatt as assistant director. He continued working with him for long six years and did many big films like Hum Hain Rahi Pyar Ke, Naajayaz, Chaahat (1996 film), Duplicate (1998 film), Angaaray (1998 film) etc. He became close to Shah Rukh Khan and Juhi Chawla and eventually joined their company Dreamz Unlimited which produced many hit films like Phir Bhi Dil Hai Hindustani, Aśoka (film), Chalte Chalte (2003 film) etc. Vivek Sharma's good command over languages specially Hindi became a big help for actors and he became integral part of their journey. In a very short span of time he became part of 25 films. Directed many ads. Launch ad for Santro car was his big achievement as it was produced by his own banner Filmzone Creations LLP known as Filmzone. In year 2008 Vivek Sharma turned independent filmmaker with one the biggest block buster Bhoothnath which was a very big cast film ( Amitabh Bachchan, Juhi Chawla and Shahrukh Khan). In Kal Kissne Dekha he launched many new faces Like Jackky Bhagnani, Nushrat Bharucha and Vaishali Desai. His latest romantic comedy A Game Called Relationship marked his acting debut also.

== Filmography ==
Year	Film	Language	Director	Producer	Writer	Actor
1993	Sir	Hindi	Assistant	No	No	No
1993	Gumrah	Hindi	Assistant	No	No	No
1993	Hum Hain Rahi Pyar Ke	Hindi	Assistant	No	No	No
1993	Gunaah	Hindi	Assistant	No	No	No
1993	Tadipaar	Hindi	Assistant	No	No	No
1993	Phir Teri Kahani Yaad Aai	Hindi	Assistant	No	No	No
1994	Naaraz	Hindi	Assistant	No	No	No
1995	Milan	Hindi	Assistant	No	No	No
1996	Chahat	Hindi	Assistant	No	No	No
1999	Love You Hamesha	Hindi	No	No	Yes	No
2008	Bhoothnath	Hindi	Yes	No	No	No
2009	Kal Kissne Dekha	Hindi	Yes	No	No	No
2020	A Game Called Relationship	Hindi	Yes	Yes	Yes	Yes

=== Music videos ===
Year	Song	Language	Ref.
2014	Naro Mein Indra Hai	Hindi	
2015	Dhikkar Hai	Hindi	
2018	Jaane Kya Modd Aaya	Hindi	
