= Bhoothnath =

2008 Indian film by Vivek Sharma

- Theatrical release poster
- Directed by: Vivek Sharma
- Written by: Vivek Sharma; Sudhanshu Dube
- Story by: Vivek Sharma
- Based on: The Canterville Ghost by Oscar Wilde
- Produced by: Ravi Chopra
- Starring: Amitabh Bachchan; Juhi Chawla; Shah Rukh Khan; Aman Siddiqui; Rajpal Yadav; Priyanshu Chatterjee
- Cinematography: Vishnu Rao
- Edited by: K. Vikas
- Music by: Songs: Vishal–Shekhar; Background Score: Salim–Sulaiman
- Production company: B.R. Films
- Distributed by: Indian Films (India); Eros International (International)
- Release date: 9 May 2008
- Running time: 136 minutes
- Country: India
- Language: Hindi
- Budget: ₹20 crore (equivalent to ₹61 crore or US$6.3 million in 2026)
- Box office: ₹38.8 crore (equivalent to ₹118 crore or US$12 million in 2026)

Bhoothnath (transl. Lord of ghosts) is a 2008 Indian Hindi-language supernatural comedy film written and directed by debutant Vivek Sharma and produced by Ravi Chopra in his final film project before his death. An adaptation of Oscar Wilde's 1887 short story "The Canterville Ghost", the film stars Amitabh Bachchan as the titular character Kailash, with Juhi Chawla, debutante Aman Siddiqui, Priyanshu Chatterjee and Rajpal Yadav, while Shah Rukh Khan appears in an extended cameo.

Bhoothnath was released on 9 May 2008, receiving positive reviews from critics. It was well received by audiences and popular among children, becoming a success at the box office. The performances of the main cast were praised by critics and audiences alike. A sequel titled Bhoothnath Returns, written and directed by Nitesh Tiwari, was released on 11 April 2014; it shares a remote connection with the original.

== Plot ==
One windy night, a young couple sneaks into the Nath Villa, a huge bungalow in Goa, only to discover that a ghost haunts the house, causing them to flee.

Days later, Aditya, an engineer working on a cruise line, temporarily moves into the villa with his wife Anjali and son Aman, nicknamed "Banku". The next day, he bids them a brief farewell due to work commitments, with Banku attending his first day at the new school, meeting rival student Jojo. The two then exchange pranks, with Banku tricked into pranking their principal. After getting in trouble, Banku and Jojo become friends.

Later that night, Banku sneaks into the living room to eat ice cream and encounters a ghost named Kailash Nath. Banku, however, was told by his mother that ghosts do not exist but angels do, considers him to be one, nicknaming him Bhoothnath (from bhoot, ghost, and "Nath", being his surname). Banku and Bhoothnath then become entangled in a series of pranks, which don't work out in the ghost's favor, as the kid is unafraid.

Bhoothnath tries to scare Banku while he is on the edge of the stairs, but it instead results in Banku falling down and incurring a head injury, much to Bhoothnath's shock. Anjali rushes him to the doctor and Bhoothnath follows, relieved that Banku is saved. A tearful Bhoothnath apologizes to Banku and the two then become best friends.

Banku takes Bhoothnath with him to school, with the ghost playing pranks on the school principal, making everyone laugh, to the principal's chagrin. Anjali hears of the incidents at school and punishes Banku, thinking that he is acting out. Banku tries to convince his mother of Bhoothnath's existence, but Anjali cannot see the ghost, leading to Banku's frustration. Eventually, they reconcile.

Two days later, Banku defeats Jojo in the annual sports meet and wins a prize. After the sports meet, Jojo, jealous of Banku winning, tries to trap his friend by throwing him down a well, but accidentally falls in himself, leaving him to be rescued by Banku. They reconcile with Bhoothnath's help and agree to maintain the secret.

Later, Banku and Jojo participate in the fancy dress competition and act out the scene of Banku's first encounter with Bhoothnath, surprising the ghost and confusing Anjali after she is told by Jojo's mother about Kailash Nath, the ghost living in their house. In the midst of the confusion, Bhoothnath's son, Vijay Nath, suddenly returns from the United States to sell off the house. This angers the ghost, as he does not want his home to be demolished, frightening off the potential buyers. Banku calms Bhoothnath down, to which he explains his story.

Many years ago, Kailash had a happy family with his wife Nirmala and his son Vijay. Some time later, Vijay moved to the States for school, later staying there, to the dismay of his parents. His mother yearned for him to visit, but he hardly contacted them, eventually returning on the day of Nirmala's funeral, quickly trying to sell off his parents' house. Kailash turned down the buyers, angering Vijay and his wife, with the two requesting his father to move with them to America, saying that nothing is left for them in the house but him, who was (and still is) emotionally attached to it. Kailash declined the offer, to which Vijay then left with his family to the airport the next day, all the while Kailash desperately trying to convince him not to leave him and the house. In his futile attempt to save his son, Kailash tripped down the stairs, accidentally killing himself.

Unaware that he has just died, Kailash's ghost rose after Vijay to bring him back home, but his son could not see or hear him. Devastated, he returned to the house, and found his body lying on the bottom of the stairs, realizing he had become a ghost.

Aditya, returning from his work after hearing the story, believes in Bhoothnath's existence after Banku points to a moving chair. Aditya and Anjali decide to perform Bhoothnath's final rites to give him salvation, though Banku is only told that they are "celebrating his birthday". Aditya meets Vijay and confronts him. Guilt-ridden, Vijay arrives during the ceremony and apologizes for his mistakes and tells Aditya and Anjali that they can permanently live in the house. Bhoothnath forgives his son, immediately ascending to heaven, having attained peace. Banku, seeing a tearful Bhoothnath disappear, is distraught.

The next day he is leaving for school, Banku is heartbroken without Bhoothnath. But, shockingly, Bhoothnath appears again, and the two are happily reunited. He requests Banku and, through a fourth-wall break, the viewers, to keep their secret. The film ends with "to be continued", setting the stage for a sequel.

== Cast ==
- Amitabh Bachchan as Kailash Nath a.k.a. Bhoothnath
- Shah Rukh Khan as Aditya "Adi" Sharma (extended cameo appearance)
- Juhi Chawla as Anjali Sharma, Aditya's wife
- Aman Siddiqui as Aman "Banku" Sharma, Aditya and Anjali's son
- Priyanshu Chatterjee as Vijay Nath, Kailash and Nirmala's son
- Satish Shah as Principal J.J. Irani
- Rajpal Yadav as Anthony
- Delnaaz Paul as Jojo's mother
- Amit Behl as Dr. Behl
- Anup Upadhyay as Teacher
- Achyut Potdar as Temple Priest
- Atul Srivastava as Jagan
- Devendra as Jojo, Aman "Banku" Sharma's friend
- Amay Kadakia as Amit

Cameo appearances

- Ashish Chaudhary as Rohan
- Nauheed Cyrusi as Tina
- Neena Kulkarni as Nirmala Nath, Kailash's late wife and Vijay's late mother
- Shaana Diya as Shaana Nath, Vijay's wife and Kailash's daughter in law
- Shrey Bawa as Vibhu Nath, Vijay's son and Kailash's grandson

== Music ==
Bhoothnath

Soundtrack album by Vishal–Shekhar
- Released: 8 April 2008
- Recorded: 6:28
- Genre: Film soundtrack
- Label: T-Series
- Producer: Vishal–Shekhar

Vishal–Shekhar chronology
Tashan (2008)	Bhoothnath (2008)	Bachna Ae Haseeno (2008)

All songs are composed by Vishal–Shekhar with lyrics by Javed Akhtar.

Song title	Singer(s)
Mere Buddy	Amitabh Bachchan, Armaan Malik
Hum Toh Hain Aandhi	Koushtuv Ghosh, Aparna Bhagwat, Sharavan Suresh & Sneha Suresh
Banku Bhaiya	Sukhwinder Singh
Samay Ka Pahiya	Hariharan, Sukhwinder Singh
Chalo Jaane Do	Amitabh Bachchan, Juhi Chawla
Mere Buddy (Repeat)	Amitabh Bachchan, Armaan Malik
Bhoothnath Theme	Instrumental

== Reception ==
The film received generally positive response from critics. As of June 2020, the film holds a 60% approval rating on Rotten Tomatoes, based on five reviews with an average rating of 6.25/10. At the box office, the film had a slow opening, though it managed to gross ₹68 million (US$710,000) among its theatrical run and was declared a semi-hit by Box Office India.

== Sequel ==
As the film finished with a "to-be-continued" ending, a sequel to Bhoothnath was expected, but there was no clear intention. Bachchan and the original production team announced a sequel, titled Bhoothnath Returns, which was co-written and directed by Nitesh Tiwari, and released on 11 April 2014. Bachchan and Khan reprised their roles, though the latter only had a cameo appearance.

== See also ==
- List of ghost films
- The Canterville Ghost
