= Nick Jr. (India) =

Indian pay television channel

- Logo used since 2024
- Country: India
- Broadcast area: India; Bangladesh; Pakistan; Bhutan; Nepal
- Headquarters: Mumbai, India

Programming
- Languages: English; Telugu; Kannada; Malayalam; Tamil; Bengali; Marathi; Hindi
- Picture format: 576p SDTV

Ownership
- Owner: JioStar (branding licensed from Skydance Corporation)
- Parent: Nickelodeon Group
- Sister channels: Nickelodeon; Nickelodeon HD+; Sonic

History
- Launched: 21 November 2012; 13 years ago

Links
- Website: www.nickjrindia.com

Nick Jr. is an Indian children's pay television kids channel which is devoted to toddlers. The channel is the Indian equivalent to the American Nick Jr. and a sister channel to Nickelodeon India.

== History ==
Logo used from 2012 to 2024

Nick Jr. was originally a block on Nickelodeon before Viacom18 launched it as a separate channel in fall 2012.

Viacom18 launched TeenNick and Nick Jr. as a single channel on 21 November 2012 in English and Hindi audio feeds. Initially, Nick Jr. aired in the daytime while TeenNick aired at night. However, TeenNick was discontinued on 1 February 2017, which made Nick Jr. a 24-hour channel.
