= TeenNick (Indian TV programming block) =

Defunct Indian television block

TeenNick India
- Country: India
- Broadcast area: India; Bangladesh; Bhutan; Nepal
- Headquarters: Mumbai, India

Programming
- Languages: English; Hindi

Ownership
- Owner: Viacom18

History
- Launched: November 21, 2012
- Closed: February 1, 2017

Links
- Website: teenick.in

TeenNick India was a programming block devoted to teens, it was part of Nickelodeon India from 2012 to 2017.

== History ==
Nickelodeon India air Nickelodeon programming on the main channel and decided to launch those shows as part of a night time programming block in 2012 on Nick Jr. India., When it launched, the channel mostly aired action shows like Power Rangers. Nick HD+ launched in 2015 also had some live action programming.

On 1 February 2017 the block was discontinued, making Nick Jr. a 24-hour channel. Nickelodeon HD+ also stopped airing live action programs from that date however they were again started from 2 August 2021.

== Programming ==
- Are You Afraid of the Dark?
- The Adrenaline Project
- Bella and the Bulldogs
- Big Time Rush
- Clarissa Explains It All
- Drake & Josh
- Dum Dama Dum
- The Haunted Hathaways
- Game Shakers
- Figure It Out
- Genie in the House
- Gilli Gilli Gappa
- Globo Loco
- J Bole Toh Jadoo
- Jai Shri Krishna
- The Journey of Allen Strange
- Junior G
- Kenan & Kel
- Legends of the Hidden Temple
- Henry Danger
- House of Anubis
- iCarly
- Mr. Meaty
- Marvin Marvin
- Nicky, Ricky, Dicky & Dawn
- Ninja Turtles: The Next Mutation
- Nickelodeon Guts
- Power Rangers
  - Power Rangers Super Ninja Steel
  - Power Rangers Ninja Steel
  - Power Rangers Dino Super Charge
  - Power Rangers Dino Charge
  - Power Rangers Super Samurai
  - Power Rangers Samurai
  - Power Rangers Megaforce
  - Power Rangers Beast Morphers
- Sam & Cat
- Supah Ninjas
- Tricky TV
- The Thundermans
- The Troop
- True Jackson, VP
- Unfabulous
- Ultraman Mebius
- Uncle Max
- Victorious
