= Keymon Ache =

Television series

- A wallpaper created by Nickelodeon. From left to right: Mishra Sir, Sid, Rahul, Mini, Rohan, Keymon, Mom (Radha), and Dad (Shyam).
- Genre: Comedy
- Voices of: Brian D'costa
- Country of origin: India
- Original language: Hindi
- No. of episodes: 164

Production
- Editors: Vinayak Raj; Venkat Reddy; Venugopal Reddy; Sarath Babu
- Production company: DQ Entertainment International

Original release
- Network: Nickelodeon India
- Release: 2011

Keymon Ache is an Indian animated television series produced by DQ Entertainment International, which aired on Nickelodeon India. It was the first Indian non-mythological animated show that was produced completely locally.

The show is about the life of an ordinary boy who has a magical school bag named Keymon which was brought by his dad from Japan.

Mobile video games based on the series have been released by Indian software companies such as MobiTrail.

== Synopsis ==
9 year old Rohan Tendulkar gets a gift from his father. The gift is a magical school bag from Toyland called Keymon Ache from Japan. It can speak and enchant other toys. This changes Rohan's life forever.

== Characters ==
=== Main characters ===
- Keymon Ache: Keymon is a magical school bag which was gifted to Rohan by his father, who had brought it from a trip to Japan. Keymon has the ability to speak and enchant other toys. He is from Toyland, Japan, and can speak the 'Toylish' language, the language of the toys of Japan. His magical chant is 'appal pappal chappal chaat, Toylish me sunlo meri baat'. His magic mostly ends up creating trouble. He is like a brother to Rohan.
- Rohan Tendulkar: Rohan is an ordinary student of K A Concept School who lives with his parents and Keymon. He sometimes misuses Keymon's magic. His friends are Rahul and Mini, while his rival is Sid. He often gets scolded by his mother and gets punished by his class teacher. He loves watching cartoons and playing with Khel Singh and Ballji Bopta.

=== Supporting characters ===
- Mini: She is Rohan's school friend. Rohan and Rahul have a crush on her. She is not interested in Keymon's magic and not afraid of Sid, unlike Rohan and Rahul.
- Rahul: He is Rohan's school friend. He never misuses Keymon's magic. He gets jealous of Rohan when he misuses Keymon's magic to show off. He wears round glasses and has a small height. He belongs to a rich family.
- Sid: He is the school bully and always troubles Rohan and Rahul. He mostly takes Rahul's tiffin. He is very good as a batsman in cricket. He even steals the stuff belonging to Rohan when they are enchanted by Keymon.
- Radha Tendulkar: She is Rohan's mother, Shyam Tendulkar's wife. She often scolds Rohan and Keymon, but loves them a lot.
- Shyam Tendulkar: He is Rohan's father, Radha's husband. He rarely scolds Keymon and Rohan. He works in an office. His boss in his office calls him 'Tendulkar saahab'.
- Mishra Sir: He is Rohan's class teacher. He often scolds Rohan due to Keymon's antics. He has a black mustache and black hair.
- Tyrus Sir: He is the principal of K A Concept School. He is very strict.
- Khel Singh: He is a portable gaming console enchanted by Keymon to help Rohan. He has a Bihari accent. He is red-colored. He is very talkative and says 'khaamosh' most of the time.
- Ballchi Bopta: He is a football enchanted by Keymon to win a football match. He is yellow and black colored. He has a Nepali accent.
- Cartoon: He is a toy car enchanted by Keymon. He makes a siren sound with a red light if their parents are coming to their room. He also agrees with what Keymon says. He is red-colored.
- Mr. Sharma: He is a neighbour of the Tendulkar family. His car was always being damaged by Keymon and Rohan, so he hates Keymon and Rohan.
- Dadaji: He is Rohan's grandfather, Radha's father-in-law, Shyam Tendulkar's father. He doesn't have teeth, so he eats with the help of Denture.
- Raja and Baja: Raja and Baja are sidekick of Sid.
- Neha: She is Rohan and Rahul's old friend. She always cried for small things. So, Rohan and Rahul broke her friendship.
- DJ Danger: He is a DJ controller enchanted by Keymon. He plays music.

== Episodes ==
- Episode 1: Monkey Keymon
- Episode 2: Keymon in School
- Episode 3: Burger
- Episode 4: House Cleaning
- Episode 5: Khaamoshi
- Episode 6: Ballji
- Episode 7: Dancing Shoes
- Episode 8: A Different Cow
- Episode 9 : Magical Clock
- Episode 10: Talent Show
- Episode 11: Magic Spray
- Episode 12: Sports Day
- Episode 13: Double Trouble
- Episode 14: Double Trouble (Part 2)
- Episode 15: Report Card
- Episode 16: Rohan becomes Ill
- Episode 17: Tuition Teacher
- Episode 18: Chocolate Keymon
- Episode 19: Keymon @ Filmstar
- Episode 20: Khel Singh becomes Ill
- Episode 21: The Legends of Holi
- Episode 22: Holi hai Holi
- Episode 23: Crazy Keymon
- Episode 24: Fight between Mom and Dad
- Episode 25: Majestic Maestro
- Episode 26: Tooth Ache ka Saath
- Episode 27: Neha a new girl friend
- Episode 28: Tiffangiri
- Episode 29: Dabaang Keymon
- Episode 30: Rohan & Rahul Friendship
- Episode 31: Diwali ka School Drama
- Episode 32: Diwali Dhamaka
- Episode 33: Bhoot Bungalow
- Episode 34: Bhool Bulaya
- Episode 35: Cartoon race
- Episode 36: Mummicopter
- Episode 37: Mini's Birthday Gift
- Episode 38: Pyramid Power
- Episode 39: Rahul Vs Sid
- Episode 40: TV Trouble
- Episode 41: Amusement Park
- Episode 42: Metro Train
- Episode 43: Goodbye Keymon!!

== Film ==
A film named Keymon & Nani in Space Adventure based on the series was released in theatres on 9 November 2012. The character of Nani in this film was played by an animated version of Usha Uthup.

== Home video ==
Nickelodeon released a DVD containing 6 episodes of 11 minutes of Dance Dance, featuring Keymon doing dance sequences. Each episode has a theme that teaches children the importance of values such as cleanliness or friendship.
