= Motu Patlu: King of Kings =

Motu Patlu King of Kings
- Theatrical Release Poster
- Directed by: Suhas D. Kadav
- Based on: Motu Patlu by Kripa Shankar Bhardwaj
- Produced by: Ketan Mehta
- Starring: Sourav Chakraborty; Vinay Pathak
- Music by: Vishal Bhardwaj
- Production companies: Viacom 18 Motion Pictures; Cosmos-Maya
- Distributed by: Viacom 18 Motion Pictures
- Release date: 14 October 2016
- Running time: 110 minutes
- Country: India
- Language: Hindi
- Box office: ₹4.27 crore (US$440,000)

Motu Patlu: King of Kings is a 2016 Indian animated action thriller film directed by Suhas D. Kadav and produced by Ketan Mehta. The film is based on the popular TV series Motu Patlu, which itself was adapted from characters published by Lotpot magazine. It is the first feature-length film based on the characters. The film was released on 14 October 2016 and became a successful venture at the box office. It received mixed reviews from critics, who appreciated its voice performances, humor, and animation but criticized its plot, violence and editing.

== Plot ==
The film opens in a circus where a vegetarian lion named Guddu Ghalib performs tricks like juggling vegetables and riding a unicycle. During one act, he accidentally causes a fire, leading to chaos. Guddu escapes in the trunk of a car and ends up in Furfuri Nagar, where his presence frightens the townspeople. Mistaking Guddu for a costumed performer, Motu and Patlu eventually discover he's a real lion with circus skills. Using an animal-translation device, they learn that Guddu wishes to return to the jungle.

Patlu suggests sending Guddu to a national park, as he lacks survival skills. Meanwhile, in the jungle, poachers led by Narasimha invade and capture King Singha, the lion ruler, to search for hidden gold. Though the animals fight back, Narasimha succeeds in imprisoning the king and begins exploiting the jungle.

Motu and friends, unaware of Narasimha's true intentions, are manipulated into believing that King Singha is a threat. After a misunderstanding, they confront the real king, who warns them about Narasimha. Motu realizes the truth too late, and King Singha is fatally injured while saving animals during an attack. Before dying, he asks Motu to protect the jungle.

Motu, Patlu, and friends attempt to rally the animals by having Guddu impersonate King Singha. Though reluctant, Guddu agrees. Narasimha, meanwhile, enlists a mad scientist to release genetically modified creatures called Donthers and later a powerful hybrid beast named Goratto. As Guddu leads the animals into battle, he panics and runs away, leaving Motu disheartened.

Motu tries to inspire the animals to resist without Guddu, but they are demoralized. Eventually, Guddu regains courage after a moment of introspection and rejoins the battle. His roar reinvigorates the animals, who fight back against Narasimha's forces. Guddu defeats Goratto in a final showdown, while Motu and Patlu subdue Narasimha and his men.

With peace restored, the animals accept Guddu as their new king. Narasimha and his allies are imprisoned, and the jungle is saved.

== Voice cast ==
- Sourav Chakraborty as Motu / Patlu / Dr.Jhatka / Ghasitaram / Inspector Chingum
- Vinay Pathak as Guddu, the circus lion
- Uday Sabnis as Narsimha, he is the main antagonist and he's a hunter and Singha's rival
- Vinod Kulkarni as Avishkari Lal, a mad scientist who has the ability to create hybrid animals and keep the jungle animals and their king at bay
- Parminder Ghumman as Viru, a rhino
- Rajesh Jolly as Singha, the lion who was the king of the jungle before Guddu.

== Release ==
The film was released theatrically on 14 October 2016, in 700 screens across India.

== Reception ==
The Times of India gave the film 3 stars. DNA gave the film 2 stars. Economic Times gave the film 3 stars.

== See also ==
- Indian animation industry
- List of Indian animated films
