= Ting Tong (TV series) =

- Promotional poster
- Genre: Comedy
- Inspired by: Gattu Battu
- Written by: Niraj Vikram
- Directed by: Shubra Chakraborty; Vijay Raibole
- Creative director: Amit Gulati
- Voices of: Sourav Chakraborty; Parminder Ghumman; Aaditya Raj; Sudhir Rewadi; Ghanshyam Shukla
- Theme music composer: Simaab Sen
- Country of origin: India
- Original language: Hindi

Production
- Executive producer: Anu Sikka
- Producer: Fable Spinners Studio
- Production company: Fable Spinners Studio

Original release
- Network: Nickelodeon Sonic; Nickelodeon India
- Release: 28 September 2020

Ting Tong is a 2020 Indian animated television series directed by Shubra Chakraborty and Vijay Raibole for Nickelodeon India. It is a spin-off created around a character named Ting Tong from Gattu Battu, a Nickelodeon India original series. The series is produced by Fable Spinners Studio and distributed by Viacom 18. It was premiered on 28 September 2020.

== Synopsis ==
The series is a spin-off made around a character named Ting Tong from the well-known series called Gattu Battu. The story revolves around the daily adventures of fun and adorable character named Ting Tong who has a temporary memory loss issue and transforms into whatever character he sees before him when he loses his memory which transforms him into an accidental hero of the town comically catching bad guys.

== Cast ==
- Sourav Chakraborty as Ting Tong
- Parminder Ghumman as Single Dose
- Aaditya Raj as Double Dose
- Sudhir Rewadi as Meeru
- Ghanshyam Shukla as Khoonkhar Singh

== Characters ==
- Ting Tong: He is a simple, innocent, and grounded character. He has long hair falling over his eyes covering his vision consistently because of which he can't see where he is going and often ends up banging into walls, tumbling off steps, slipping of banana peels, etc. Yet that isn't all. Each time something hits his head, he loses his memory temporarily. As soon as that happens, he totally changes into any character in front of him at the time , soaking up all the characteristics; be it a human or a creature. His memory is restored only if and when his head is hit once more.
- Single Dose: He is one of the two thug siblings in Ting Tong's town. They are consistently up to some mischief. Single Dose is infamous and is the super psyche between the two. Single Dose spends all his time planning and plotting mischief/robbery. He is thin and just 3 feet tall. He is very talkative and is the leader amongst the duo.
- Double Dose: Unlike his sibling Single Dose, he is tall and physically well built. However, what he makes up for in height and body, Double Dose lacks in brains and energy. He is a character who is quite dumb and lazy, who hardly speaks, even if he does, he talks slowly. He is frequently seen around following his brother Single Dose's orders and carrying out his plans only to goof up.
- Meeru: Meeru is Ting Tong's pet and friend. Meeru is faithful to Ting Tong and their friendship is unbreakable. Meeru is the one who deals with Ting Tong when he loses memory and makes a decent attempt to take his memory back to avoid misadventures, however hilariously fails to do so. He has a Hyderabadi accent. He generally refers to himself as Nanhi si Jaan (Little sweetheart) at whatever point he is in a difficult situation.
- Khoonkhar Singh: He is the Police inspector of the town with Hoshiyaar Singh as his sergeant. He is always late at the incident, always trying to catch the Dose brothers (goons). His accent is that of Shatrughan Sinha.
- Hoshiyaar Singh: He is the sergeant (police) of the town. He is faithful to inspector Khoonkhar Singh. He is goofy.
- Wring Wrong: He is the mad scientist, arrogant and over-confident on his intelligence, who is friends with Dose brothers. He has the capability to invent things. However, he is a lot of interested with Ting Tong's capacity to change into anything. Ting Tong hurts Wring Wrong's ego, therefore he wants to make him his research project.

== Broadcast ==
- The series is being aired on Nickelodeon Sonic since September 2020.
- It aired on Nickelodeon Sonic Monday through Friday at 9 am

== See also ==
- Gattu Battu
