= Vaishali Desai =

Indian model and actress

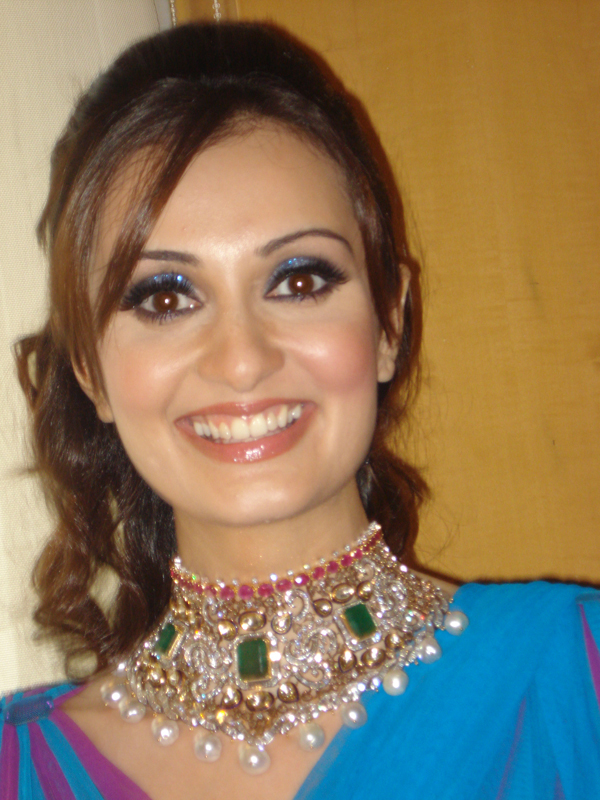
- Vaishali at the IIJW,2010 as the Show Stopper for a jewellery Brand.
- Occupations: Model, Bollywood actress
- Relatives: Manmohan Desai (grand father)

Vaishali Desai is an Indian actress, model and beauty pageant titleholder. She is the granddaughter of veteran filmmaker Manmohan Desai. She won the title of Femina Miss India International 2005 and represented India at Miss International 2005 pageant held in Tokyo. She started her acting career with in the film Kal Kissne Dekha.

== Early life ==
Vaishali Desai is a Gujarati. She is the grandniece of filmmaker Manmohan Desai.

Vaishali was brought up in Bangalore. Vaishali did her schooling in Sophia High School, Bangalore. She finished her graduation from Mount Carmel College, Bangalore. After her Miss India contest she shifted her base to Mumbai with her family for modelling and further studies.

Vaishali was doing ramp shows in Bangalore and was a top model. Her first show was when she was fourteen. Her major break and entry in the acting world was with her first commercial for Ponds Dreamflower Talc. She later was seen in ads like Tanishq, Compaq, Raymonds. Vaishali has, however, not changed her name to Vyshalee Desai as given in her debut film Kal Kissne Dekha. Vaishali recently starred in a short psychological horror film titled Similitude, the film was officially selected at the 23rd Busan International Film Festival and competed under the Asian Short Film Competition Category.

== Modelling and advertisements ==
She was seen in a Compaq laptop ad and in the very famous Raymond ad. She is now being seen in another Tanishq ad with Nafisa Ali. She has done ads for products like Swarnam Oil and Power detergent. Vaishali was seen in an ad with Shah Rukh Khan for Sunfeast, and in a Dabur Gulabari ad.

Vaishali did her first video for Kumar Sanu for the song 'Aisa na dekho Mujhe.' She did three videos for the band Euphoria. She did "Soneya" with them which was followed by "Mehfuz" which was directed by Pradeep Sarkar.

Vaishali had participated in the Elite Look of the Year contest and was the second runner-up. Vaishali participated in the Pond's Femina Miss India contest and was the third runner-up becoming the Miss India International even though she wasn't in the five finalists. Vaishali then left in the same year for the Miss International contest in Tokyo but failed to win due to her having conjunctivitis.

Vaishali has done ramp shows for top Indian designers. She has participated in the Lakme Fashion Week, Dhaka Fashion Week, and Sri Lankan Fashion week and done shows for L'Oréal, Moschino, etc. She has done a lot of print and editorial work as well.

== Filmography ==
Year	Film	Role	Language	Notes
2009	Kal Kissne Dekha	Misha Kapoor	Hindi	
2012	Tukkaa Fitt	Priya	Hindi	
2015	Solid Patels	Aliya Desai	Hindi	
2018	Similitude	Amyra Shroff	English	

Awards and achievements
Preceded by Mihika Verma	Miss International India; 2005	Succeeded by Sonnalli Seygall
