= Pakdam Pakdai =

Indian kids comedy animated series

- Also known as: Rat-a-Tat
- Genre: Comedy; Slapstick
- Voices of: Shah Rukh Khan; Sunny Deol; Paresh Rawal; Akshay Kumar; Suneil Shetty
- Composers: Rotem Hecht; Guy Dagul; Tony Wilson
- Country of origin: India
- Original language: Hindi
- No. of seasons: 14
- No. of episodes: 735

Production
- Running time: 6-11 minutes
- Production company: Toonz Media Group

Original release
- Network: Nickelodeon India; Nickelodeon Sonic
- Release: 27 May 2013

Pakdam Pakdai (transl. Chasing), known internationally as Rat-a-Tat, is an Indian Hindi Flash-animated comedy television series, formerly on Nickelodeon India and later on Nickelodeon Sonic. It chronicles the comedic adventures of a slim, pink dog named Doggy Don, whose life is constantly disrupted by three mice - Chhotu, Lambu and Motu respectively, who regularly cause mischief in his life.

The show began airing on 27 May 2013. Pakdam Pakdai is narrated by Nana, the eponymous narrator. Worldwide releases of the show, however, omit this in favor of silent comedy.

== Synopsis ==
Doggy Don is an anthropomorphic little pink dog, who resides in the modern suburbs of an unspecified location somewhere in India. Unfortunately, he shares his house with three troublemaking mice: Chhotu, Lambu and Motu, dubbed the "Chuha Party" ("transl. Rat Party"). Don is usually accompanied by his older brother, Colonel, an ex-army dog who has a stronger grudge against the mice with his shorter temper, and Ballu, a cranky and aggressive Great Dane, who is Don's neighbor.

Every episode in the series circulates around some type of chaos that the mice produce and the havoc that ensues as the dogs attempt to stop the situation from escalating further, only to either make things worse or take the blame for the mice's shenanigans. Ranging from stealing food to framing others for their own misdeeds and even hijacking vehicles to go on joyrides, the mice will go to any length possible to wreak havoc and irritate the people around them and escalate their situations to extremely outrageous heights, usually, but not exclusively the dogs.

== Characters ==
=== Main ===
- Doggy Don is a pink Dachshund who is usually irritated by the mice. His days are always ruined by them - therefore, he always plans to get revenge on them by retaliating in a multitude of different ways, and rarely succeeds. In spite of his luck, he is quite intelligent and can quickly solve his way out of a situation if the mice don't interfere (unfortunately, they rarely don't). His catchphrase is "Don se bachna mushkil hi nahi, naa mumkin hai" (Escaping from Don is not only difficult, it is impossible). Don lives in a house with his elder brother, the three mice, and later Tau. His house has a built-in laboratory, which he occasionally uses to conspire plans against the mice.
- The Mice
  - Chhotu is the leader of the Chuha Party and is the oldest out of all of them. He is a yellow mouse with brown hair and spectacles. Chhotu is funny, smart, hyperactive, and impish for pranking Don with his group. He's also the most ingenious for coming up with ideas on situations or methods. Despite this, he has himself defeated of others, which frequently leads to his defeat at the hands of the dogs and sometimes his own friends.
  - Lambu is a purple mouse with black hair who is the middle child of the group. He is described as cool, laid-back and chill compared to the others, but still doesn't shy away from having fun with his friends and generally wreaking havoc. He is quite the jokester and he likes to hang around with others. His catchphrase is "Don't make me angry".
  - Motu is the youngest of the Chuha Party. He is a fat grayish-blue mouse with a big appetite. As the glutton of the trio, he is fixated on food most of the time, which drives his group nuts.

=== Recurring ===
- Colonel is the overprotective, aggressive and occasionally arrogant older brother of Don. He is a muscular green Rottweiler with a soldier's hat (as he was a former soldier), tags, and white gloves. He almost always helps Don for dealing with the mice's shenanigans. He's quite strong compared to the others.
- Ballu is a cranky, easily angered, muscular-looking Great Dane who lives in the house next door. A running gag of the show has Don, Karnal or the mice doing something which aggravates him or causes him to suffer in a situation, and as punishment, he'll pummel them in various fashions, either onscreen or offscreen. He and Karnal are of the same age, and are sometimes shown to be friends.
- Major Saab Jr. is Don and Karnal's friend, who is also a dog. The brothers adopted him when Tau's father, who was part of the Air Force, was killed in a helicopter accident. He is younger in age and smaller in size compared to both Don and Karnal. He is often seen hanging out with Don and Karnal and competing against the mice. He seems to be quite a gourmand, and will usually tend to eat everything in the refrigerator for a single meal.

== Broadcast ==
Network	Release years
Nickelodeon India	2013–2014; 2017–2018
Nickelodeon Sonic	2014–2020; 2022–present
Nickelodeon HD+	2015–2020
Rishtey	2016–present
ETV Bal Bharat	2021–present

== Episodes ==
=== Season 1 (2013–14) ===
No. overall	No. in season	Title	Original release date
1	1	"Beach Boys"	27 May 2013
Doggy Don and Colonel go to the beach, followed by some chaos.
2	2	"Remote War"	28 May 2013
Doggy Don and the mice fight over the TV remote.
3	3	"The Date"	29 May 2013
Doggy Don goes on a date, but disaster ensues when the mice come along.
4	4	"Chill Out"	30 May 2013
On a hot day, the mice drop the fridge on Doggy Don and Colonel must save him.
5	5	"A Wild Pitch"	1 June 2013
Doggy Don and Colonel play cricket, but things go horribly wrong.
6	6	"Catch That Bird"	2 June 2013
Doggy Don finds a baby bird, but the mice, Colonel, and Rox want to eat it.
7	7	"I Gotta Go!"	3 June 2013
Doggy Don tries to pee but the mice take advantage of it.
8	8	"Moo-ing Trouble"	4 June 2013
A cow shows up in Doggy Don's bathroom.
9	9	"An Eerie Hustle"	5 June 2013
After getting blown up, Doggy Don turns into a ghost and starts haunting the mice.
10	10	"A Zoo Trip"	6 June 2013
Doggy Don and Colonel go to a zoo, but disaster follows.
11	11	"Airborne"	7 June 2013
Doggy Don and Colonel build an airplane followed by some mid-air chase comedy.
12	12	"A Sweet Rush"	8 June 2013
Doggy Don and the mice fight over a layered cake.
13	13	"Rest-O-War"	9 June 2013
At a restaurant, Doggy Don tries to make an onion fritter but it keeps getting eaten by the mice.
14	14	"Dimsum to Go"	10 June 2013
Doggy Don and the mice engage into a tussle over a bowl of dimsums.
15	15	"Health on My Mind"	11 June 2013
Doggy Don and Colonel visit a hospital, but the mice constantly torture Colonel.
16	16	"Music Mayhem"	12 June 2013
Doggy Don listens to music, but the mice intervene.
17	17	"Cuppa Chase"	13 June 2013
Doggy Don tries to peacefully drink tea, but the mice thwart each attempt.
18	18	"Baby on Loose"	14 June 2013
Doggy Don finds a baby.
19	19	"Mango Rush"	15 June 2013
Doggy Don tries to eat mangoes, but the mice ruin his attempt.
20	20	"Shopping Mad"	16 June 2013
Doggy Don and Colonel go the shopping mall followed by chaos.
21	21	"Rainy Blues"	17 June 2013
After Colonel breaks a hole in the ceiling, Doggy Don and Colonel try to rebuild their roof with the mice ruining the attempt.
22	22	"Frequent Flyer"	18 June 2013
Doggy Don and Colonel go to the airport and visit a plane, followed by the mischiveous mice.
23	23	"How To Ride a Bike"	19 June 2013
Colonel tries to teach Doggy Don how to ride a bike, but the mice violently ruin each try,
24	24	"A Fishy Chase"	20 June 2013
Don orders a fish, but the mice want to eat it.
25	25	"Poolside Fun"	21 June 2013
Doggy Don and Colonel go to a community pool, but the mice ruin the fun.
26	26	"A Merry Ride"	22 June 2013
The dogs visit a fair, but things turn around horribly.
27	27	"A Bumpy Trek"	23 June 2013
The dogs try mountain trekking, in spite of the mice.
28	28	"A Slice of Fun"	24 June 2013
Doggy Don orders a pizza, but the mice keep eating every pizza that he gets.
29	29	"Down With Flu"	25 June 2013
Doggy Don comes down with flu and Colonel must take care of him. The mice take advantage of this.
30	30	"Gaming Trouble"	26 June 2013
Doggy Don is addicted to a game and the mice do everything possible to make Doggy Don lose his focus.
31	31	"The Big Clean Up"	27 June 2013
Doggy Don tries to clean his messy house but the mice do everything in their power to make sure it stays dirty.
32	32	"Paint Job"	28 June 2013
The dogs try to paint their house followed by a heap of disaster.
33	33	"Cruise Blues"	29 June 2013
The dogs visit a cruise ship, followed by the mice.
34	34	"Flash Blind"	30 June 2013
Don gets a camera, leading to some chaos.
35	35	"Crazy Cricket"	1 July 2013
A game of cricket goes out of control.
36	36	"Python Problem"	2 July 2013
A python causes trouble for the gang.
37	37	"Camping Trip"	3 July 2013
A camping trip goes wrong and attracts a bear.
38	38	"Mini Fix"	4 July 2013
Doggy Don tries to keep Colonel's Legos undamaged while the mice try to make sure that Doggy Don ends up destroying them.
39	39	"Space Ride"	5 July 2013
The dogs go on a space ride.
40	40	"Shrunken Jam"	6 July 2013
Doggy Don shrinks himself to take his precious cake back from the mice.
41	41	"Love Me Not"	7 July 2013
The dogs and the mice go on a hilarious deep sea adventure.
42	42	"A Cold Crunch"	8 July 2013
Don and the mice get into a fight including an electric blanket.
43	43	"Don in Pain"	9 July 2013
Doggy Don eats a metallic hotdog, causing him pain. Colonel tries his best attempts to remove his pained tooth.
44	44	"Just A Day's Work"	10 July 2013
This episode shows a typical day of the dogs and the mice's hilarious antics.
45	45	"Rat Control"	11 July 2013
Doggy Don becomes friends with the mice, but Colonel is not convinced and decides to get rid of the mice by calling rat control.
46	46	"Holiday Resort"	12 July 2013
Don and Colonel go to a resort for their holiday, but they are unaware of the following disaster.
47	47	"Misadventure"	13 July 2013
Doggy Don tries to paint a painting, despite the mice's efforts to ruin his attempts.
48	48	"Cinema Night"	14 July 2013
Colonel and Doggy Don go to the theater to watch a movie, but things go awry.
49	49	"Fright Night"	15 July 2013
Don and Colonel watch a scary movie at night. The mice make things even more horryifying.
50	50	"Universal Remote"	16 July 2013
The mice make a universal remote to control Colonel, which causes problems.
51	51	"Monkey Business"	17 July 2013
A monkey invades the house and causes trouble for the animals.
52	52	"Laundry Business"	20 July 2013
Don and the mice start a fight including laundry.
53	53	"Yogi Don"	24 July 2013
Doggy Don tries yoga, but the mice mess things up.
54	54	"Invisible Don"	27 July 2013
Don is tired of the trio and decides to turn himself invisible to turn the tables. This backfires when the mice find out about his plan.
55	55	"Rock-N-Roll Don"	2 August 2013
Doggy Don finds a ukulele in the basement and decides to play it, but it turns out that he is a bad ukulele player. Then Charly offers him an electric guitar. The music is so loud that no one can stand it. After a while, Colonel decides to join him, causing more chaos.
56	56	"Ant Attack"	4 August 2013
A colony of ants raid the house, triggering a wild frenzy.
57	57	"Sleepy Colonel"	7 August 2013
Colonel is extremely tired and must have some rest. Doggy Don tries everything to make sure he stays asleep, but the mice do the opposite.
58	58	"Eye Strain"	17 August 2013
The rat trio messes with Don's contact lenses, causing Don to think he is blind. It gets even worse when they play video clips in his eyes.
59	59	"Electric Chase"	23 August 2013
The dogs build an electric robot cat to chase the mice, but it turns out to become a big problem.
60	60	"Car Naama"	28 August 2013
A car ride whips into a frenzy.
61	61	"Kites Away"	5 September 2013
Don and the mice engage in a tussle over flying kites in the sky. To make matters worse, Rox appears in the battle.
62	62	"Field Trip Fiasco"	10 September 2013
The dogs visit Qutab Minar, but the mice make sure their trip is ruined.
63	63	"Diver Bros"	16 September 2013
The dogs go sea diving, but the mice turn things around for the worse.
64	64	"Neighbor Watch"	19 September 2013
A lady cat shows up next to Don's house and everyone except for Marly falls for her, which causes a fight.
65	65	"Train Ride"	26 September 2013
The dogs go on a train ride, but the mice cause danger on the rails.
66	66	"Money In The Bank"	9 October 2013
Doggy Don ends up with a heap of money so he decides to put it in the bank, but the mice want to be rich.
67	67	"Road Trip Snag"	20 October 2013
Don and Colonel go on a trip, but it is constantly foiled by the mice.
68	68	"A Rodent Fix"	2 November 2013
Don and the mice join together to stop a food-stealing squirrel named Sammy.
69	69	"A Day At The Museum"	5 November 2013
The dogs go to the museum with disaster in the air.
70	70	"Super Hero Don"	8 November 2013
Don gets super powers and uses them to defeat the mice, triggering mayhem.
71	71	"Library Trouble"	10 November 2013
Don and Colonel are in the library. Don tries not to disturb the librarian Rox whilst the mice try to make as much noise as they can.
72	72	"Magic Shoes"	13 November 2013
Don finds a pair of magic shoes and uses them to fight the mice which spirals into a disaster.
73	73	"Maraton Hitch"	28 November 2013
The dogs and the mice start a rollicking, hilarious race to the finish.
74	74	"Ski Trip Fun"	18 December 2013
Don and Colonel go on a ski trip with Betty, but the mice obviously want to ruin the fun. Note: This is Betty's second appearance in the series. Her first was "The Date".
75	75	"Day At The Spa"	3 January 2014
The dogs go to a spa, despite the constant chaos of it.
76	76	"Dinner Plans"	28 January 2014
The dogs enter a fancy hotel, but disaster follows with the mice.
77	77	"Office Fiasco"	1 March 2014
Don gets a new job, but the mice try to ruin it.
78	78	"A Cola Fix"	7 March 2014
Doggy Don and Colonel open a new cola business, but the mice try to drink all of the cola.

== Movies ==
The series has 5 feature-length films, all of which have been released direct-to-television.

No.	Title	Premiere date	Ref
1	Pakdam Pakdai Doggy Don vs. Billiman	19 December 2014	
Doggy Don and Karnal take a trip to the future and befriend a cat named Billiman, who turns out to be a villain with a facade and conquers the city. They, along with Chhotu, Motu, Lambu and the residents of the town, team up to defeat Billiman together.
2	Pakdam Pakdai Ocean Attack	22 November 2015	
Doggy Don, Karnal and their brother, Major Saab along with the mice are urged to save the world from an evil shark, called Surmai Bhopali, who destines to transform the world into an ocean only resided by sea creatures by the destroying the balance between sea and land, which is located at the heart of the ocean. Along with their new friends, Boodhababa, Manumaan and Yeti, they defeat Surmai and successfully capture him and his fish army in a jail.
3	Pakdam Pakdai: Doggy Don in Egypt	21 January 2018	
Doggy Don, Karnal, the mice brothers and an Egyptian cousin of Don work together to defeat an evil magician called Hairis who wants to take over the world.
4	Pakdam Pakdai Space Attack	13 May 2018	
Doggy Don, Karnal and the mice brothers try to save the world from an alien monkey named Hyper Bunder.
5	Pakdam Pakdai Attack on Tokyo	16 December 2018	

== Video games ==
Mobile video games based on the series have been released by Indian software companies such as Tangiapps and Toonz Games.

== Awards ==
The show is a coproduction between Nickelodeon and was launched in May 2013. It won the "Best Animated TV Episode" award at the 2014 BAF Awards, organised by FICCI, for the episode "Safari Don".

== See also ==
- Lamput, another Indian animated series in the "cat and mouse"-style slapstick genre
- Oggy and the Cockroaches, a 1998 French animated series based around a cat and three cockroaches by Jean-Yves Raimbaud
- Tom and Jerry, a 1940 American animated series based around a cat and mouse by William Hanna and Joseph Barbera
