= Nickelodeon Sonic =

Indian children's television channel

Sonic
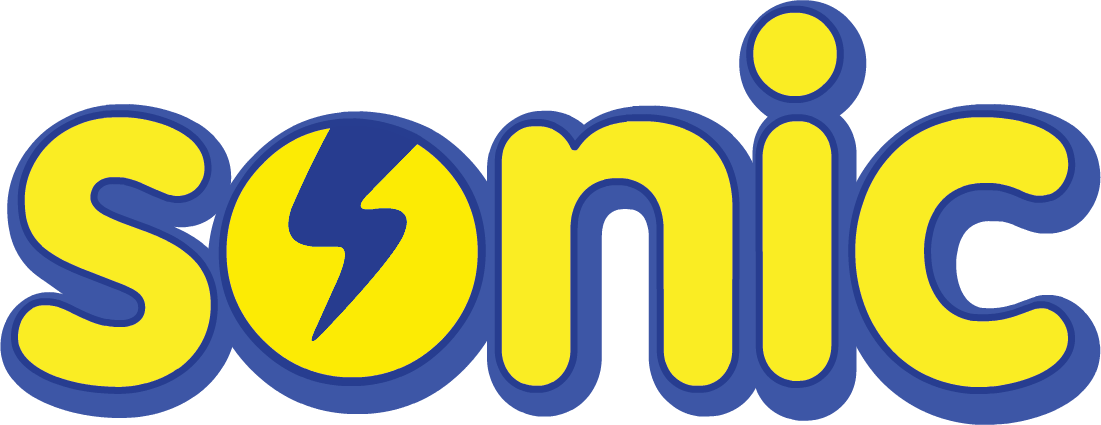
- Logo used since 2025
- Country: India
- Broadcast area: India; Nepal; Bangladesh

Programming
- Languages: Hindi; Kannada; Telugu; Tamil; Malayalam; Bengali; Marathi
- Picture format: 576p SDTV

Ownership
- Owner: JioStar
- Parent: Nickelodeon
- Sister channels: Nick; Nick HD+; Nick Jr.

History
- Launched: 20 December 2011; 14 years ago
- Former names: Sonic Nickelodeon (2011-2016); Nickelodeon Sonic (2016-2025); Sonic (2025-present)

Links
- Website: www.sonicgang.com

Availability

Streaming media
- Airtel Digital TV (India): SD
- JioTV (India): SD
- JioHotstar (India): SD

Sonic TV (formerly Nickelodeon Sonic, Sonic Nickelodeon) is an Indian children's pay television channel based in Mumbai, Maharashtra, India. It is owned by JioStar, a joint venture between Disney India and Viacom18 under license from Paramount Skydance Corporation (now Skydance as of October 6, 2026) as part of Nickelodeon India Network. After 9 years on the air, Sonic became the fourth most watched channel across all genres with TRP in December 2020.

== History ==
Viacom18 launched the channel in December 2011 in Hindi, English, Tamil. When it launched, the channel mostly aired action shows like Power Rangers, Kung Fu Panda and Teenage Mutant Ninja Turtles. On 3 May 2016, the channel was rebranded with the tag line "Destination of high decibel comedy and action", and was given a new logo.

Since the rebrand, the channel has shifted its focus to comedy and started producing some original local shows.

Sonic Nickelodeon began broadcasting in Bengali, Malayalam, Marathi, Kannada and Gujarati languages from 2 December 2019.
