= Shurugwi Rural Areas =

Area around Shurugwi, Zimbabwe

Shurugwi Rural Areas, also known as Shurugwi District, is a rural area around Shurugwi, Zimbabwe, mainly to the east, beginning 20 kilometres (12 miles) from the town centre. The area between the town and the rural areas was mainly occupied by white commercial farmers. It is thought that at one time, these farms were owned by three families who were all related. The total area of these farms is approximately 60 km x 40 km similar to an area that was occupied by more than 4,000 African families. Most of the black families are subsistence farmers. Maize is generally grown by the majority.

== Education ==
=== Primary schools ===
There are a number of primary schools in Shurugwi Rural. Most of them, like Vungwi Primary School, were built as far back as 1905. The list includes: Banga, Bokai, Chekenyu, Dhlemiti, Chikato, Dombwe, Hanke, Makonde (St Monica), Makotore, Matamba, Mavedzenge (St Peter), Mhangami (St Pius), Ndaora (St Paul), Nhema (St Francis), Pakame, Rusike Shamba, Tumba, Vungwi, Gundura, Wida, Sibolise, Charles Wreath, Zvishazha, Zvamatenga, Dhlodhlo, New Gato, Old Gato, Jongwe, Gamwa.

=== Secondary schools ===
There are a number of secondary schools in Shurugwi Rural, most notably Sibolise Secondary School, Mupangai Secondary School, Gato secondary school, Gamwa secondary school, Chivakanenyanga Secondary School, Batanai Secondary School, Rusungunuko Secondary School, Dombotombo Secondary School, Chironde-Kwagweya Secondary School, and Bokai Secondary School. The academic results from year to year are poor, which is generally blamed on the teachers.

=== High schools ===
There are only three boarding schools in Shurugwi which are all in rural areas:

Hanke Adventist High School, a Seventh-day Adventist school which traditionally offered up to 0-Levels and was called Hanke Adventist Secondary School. It was recently upgraded to offer all levels through A-Levels and changed its name to reflect that. As it is a mission school, both the primary school and the high school are on the same campus which can cause confusion between them.

Tongogara High School, only 10 km from Hanke, is a government-run high school. The boarding facilities are generally reserved for A-Levels students while the Form 1s to Form 4s are general day-schoolers (although a limited number of lower grade students have been admitted into boarding since 1990). Tongogara was founded as a secondary school in the early 1980s, and A-Level was only introduced in 1989. It is the biggest high school in Shurugwi by student population.

Pakame Mission, about 40 km to the southwest, is a Methodist-run mission. Like Hanke, it traditionally offered classes up to form 4 (O-Levels), but was recently upgraded to offer up to A-Levels. Pakame is considered the best of the three in terms of O-Level pass rate. Rusununguko is now a high school offering A levels as well.

Rusununguko High School which is 4 km was of late upgraded to offer A levels; this is the only non boarding high school in Shurugwi. This schools caters for talented students from disadvantaged families mainly from its neighboring secondary schools such as Mupangai, Bokai. The pass rate from Rusununguko is not bad, most students walk +/- 15 km to and from school. Most students who come through these walls normally fails to progress with their education because of university fees challenges

== Health ==
=== Hospitals ===
Zvamavande Rural Hospital is the only hospital in Shurugwi Rural. It is located 2 km southeast of Cha Cha Cha Township, 2 km southwest of Vungwi Primary School and 7 km northeast of Rusununguko Secondary School.

=== Clinics ===
There are a number of rural clinics in Shurugwi Rural. Notable clinics include Banga Clinic in Mfiri village which is along Beitbridge road close to the boarders of Midlands and Masvingo provinces, Hanke Clinic, on the same campus as Hanke Mission; Saint Francis Clinic, near the residence of Chief Nhema and facilitated by his politician son, Francis Nhema, about 40 km northeast of Cha Cha Cha Township and 20 km northeast of Hanke Adventist Secondary School; and Tongogara Clinic, situated at Tongogara Shopping Centre. There is also Gundura clinic, about 5 km from Pakame Mission. There is also Rusike clinic about 15 km south of Cha Cha Cha.

Zvamavande Hospital is the referral centre for all other clinics in the region which often transfers patients to Shurugwi Hospital in Shurugwi.

People still walk long distances to health centres. Serious cases are sometimes transported up to 10 km by ox-drawn carts. This happens especially to those that are from areas that are not easily accessed by cars such as resettlement areas commonly known as "minda murefu" (literally, "long fields").

=== HIV and AIDS ===
Like other rural areas, Shurugwi Rural Areas has suffered the wrath of HIV and AIDS, partly because of unawareness and poverty. Sex is considered the only form of entertainment in rural areas, given that many families do not have televisions and there are no cinemas to watch movies. Due to an unexpected number of deaths between the middle 1990s and the early 2000s, people have been frightened by the consequences of AIDS and the HIV rate in the area has recently declined.

== Resettlement areas ==
There has been considerable resettlement, since 80% of the area around Shurugwi was owned by commercial farmers (generally Caucasians) who lost their farms because of the domestic land policy of President Mugabe. The people who claimed these farms (mostly black families without land) have struggled to survive due to lack of knowledge regarding good agricultural methods. Most of the beneficiaries are not originally from Shurugwi.

== Politics ==
Home to the late freedom fighter and Commander in Chief of Zanla forces, Josiah Magama Tongogara, other notable politicians include late Midland governor and resident minister Herbert S.M Mahlaba, Francis Nhema, the Minister of Tourism in the Mugabe cabinet and an MP of Shurugwi, first Shurugwi MP at independence and now Foreign Affairs Minister Dr Simbarashe Mumbengegwi, Dr Lucia Matibenga, and Emmerson Mnangagwa, by virtue of marriage to Tongogara's sister and coming from Chirumhanzu, and Dr Frank Mbengo.

Due to patronage, MPs have since independence come from the north (15 km north of Cha Cha Cha Township), an area under the guardianship of Chief Nhema, as opposed to the south which is under Chief Ndanga. David Ruzive, a former MP who has been heavily criticized, was also from Nhema. This has caused more development in the Nhema area than in the Ndanga Area.

Cha Cha Cha Township is the best-located township in Shurugwi Rural because it is where major roads meet. Unfortunately it has been neglected and the growth point was placed at Tongogara Township. For the growth of Shurugwi Chachacha must be upgraded for it to get government funding to provide work for the local community

== Natural resources ==
The district is located on the mineral-rich belt, commonly known as the Great Dyke in Zimbabwe, known locally as Chironde Mountain range, making it one of the most mineral-rich areas in the country. Chromite, Platinum, Gold and Nickel are all mined around Shurugwi. This mountain range stretches all the way from Cape Town through to the copper belt regions of Zambia. Places of interest include Wolfshall Pass, commonly known as Boterekwa due to the winding of the road as it negotiates its way up and between mountains. Midway through Boterekwa, there is Dun raven Falls which is about 100m from the road. Boterekwa is very similar to the pass close to Louis Trichardt in South Africa since both were constructed by an Italian firm, the difference only being there are tunnels in Louis Trichardt. It has been a scene of many road accidents with most of them fatal. The most notable of these accidents occurred in 1976 when a bus load of students from Chrome Secondary School overturned. Only three teachers survived the crash. Almost every year, a serious accident do occur at Boterekwa, this is attributed to the narrow road, steep slopes and sharp curves.

Another place of interest can be the Guruguru (which means very huge) mountain, the mountain is a bare granite rock which a few kilometers east of Pakame High School. Getting to the top of this mountain can be a mission due to the absence of supporting trees and slippery rock surfaces.

Generally, Shurugwi is very scenic districts which a sizeable hills all over the place, this include Bokai, Chikomo Chirefu, Magomana, Shamba, Rasha close to Chachacha and Gururuguru. Unfortunately, due to resettlement in the area, most of the wild animals have been driven away or killed.

== See also ==
- Geography of Zimbabwe
