= Chachi =

Chachi may refer to:

- Chachi people, an indigenous people of Ecuador
- Chachi language, the Barbacoan language spoken by them
- anything of, from, or related to Chhachh, a region in Punjab, Pakistan
  - Chhachi dialect, an Indo-Aryan dialect spoken there
  - Chhachi (Punjabi clan), a sub-section of the Kohli Khokran clan in India and Pakistan
  - Chhachi (Pashtun tribe)
- Chachi Arcola, character on American television sitcom Happy Days
- Chachi Gonzales (born 1996), dancer and member of dance crew I.aM.mE, winners of America's Best Dance Crew (season 6)
- Chachi Mug, a mountain in India
- Aleks Çaçi (1916–1989), Albanian writer
- Chachi, a fictional character in the Indian comic Chacha Chaudhary

== See also ==
- Chachi 420, a 1997 Indian film
- Chhachi (disambiguation)
- Cha-Cha (disambiguation)
- Cha Chi Ming, Hong Kong businessman
