= Cha-cha-cha =

Cha cha cha may refer to:

- Cha-cha-chá (music), a style of Cuban dance music
- Cha-cha-cha (dance), a Latin American dance accompanying the music

== Film and television ==
- Cha Cha Cha (film), a 2013 Italian crime film
- Cha Cha Cha (1964 film), a 1964 Indian film
- Cha Cha Cha (TV series), a TV show from Argentina
- Cha Cha Cha Films, a film production company

== Music ==
- Cha Cha Cha (album), a 1995 album by EMF
- Cha Cha Cha, 1955 album by Monchito and the Mambo Royals
- Cha Cha Cha, 1982 album by Anne Linnet Band
- Cha Cha Cha, 1977 album by Irwin Goodman
- Cha Cha Cha, 2014 album by Abelardo Barroso
- "Cha Cha Cha" (Bruno Mars song), 2026
- "Cha Cha Cha" (MC Lyte song), 1989
- "Cha Cha Cha" (Käärijä song), 2023, the Finnish entry in the Eurovision Song Contest 2023
- "The Cha-Cha-Cha", a 1962 song by Bobby Rydell
- "Cha Cha Cha", by The Little Ones, 2006

== Other ==
- Cha Cha Cha (restaurant), a restaurant chain in Portland, Oregon, United States
- Cha Cha Cha Township, a shopping centre in rural Zimbabwe
- ChaChaCha, a team playing format in golf

== See also ==
- Cha-Cha (disambiguation)
