= Diamond Comics =

Indian comic book publishing company

- Parent company: Bhartiya Bhandar Pustakalaya
- Status: Active
- Founded: 1978; 47 years ago
- Founder: Anshul Verma & Late Gulshan Rai Verma
- Country of origin: India
- Headquarters location: Delhi, India
- Key people: Anshul Verma (Director)
- Publication types: Comics; Books
- Fiction genres: Humour; Satire
- Official website: www.diamondbooks.in

Diamond Comics is an Indian comic book publisher and distribution company, headquartered in Delhi, India. It is the largest comic book distributor and publisher in India. Diamond Comics created several original Indian comic characters like Chacha Chaudhary, Billoo, Pinki and Motu Patlu.

Diamond Group of Publications is an associated publishing house which also produces magazines. Diamond Books is another associated publishing venture with a large backlist of titles.

== Major characters of Diamond Comics ==
=== Cartoonist Pran's characters ===
- Chacha Chaudhary, main characters: Chacha Chaudhary (Chachaji), Sabu (Chachaji's faithful assistant who has come from Jupiter), Bini (Chachaji's wife) Raaket (Chachaji's dog), Raakaa (a villain who drank an 'immortality' potion), Gobar Singh (a bandit), Dhamaka Singh (Gobar's aide)
- Billoo, main characters: Billoo, Joji, Gabdu, Bajrangi Pahalwan
- Pinki, main characters: Pinki, Grandma, Grandpa, Champu, Jhapatji
- Raman - a middle class office-worker, main characters: Raman, Kamli, Khalifa, Moga Singh, Office Boss
- Shrimati Ji - a mid-class simple housewife
- Daabu
- Channi Chachi
- Soni-Sampat - a mid-class young couple

=== Teamed-up characters ===
- Chacha-Bhatija
- Sunny Gill & the Agents of Sniff (based on Sniff film) (co-operation with Eros's Trinity Pictures)
- Agniputra-Abhay
- Tau Ji (with Rumjhum)
- Motu-Patlu
- Motu-Chhotu
- Chhotu-Lamboo
- Lamboo-Motu
- Anderam-Danderam
- Alturam-Falturam
- Manglu Madari - Bander Bihari
- Mama-Bhanja
- Raajan-Iqbal
- Fauladi Singh (with Lamboo, Dr. John)
- Chacha Chaudhry (With Sabu)

=== Fun/family characters ===
- Ankur
- Chimpoo
- Paltu the mouse
- Picklu the teenage rabbit
- Meeku the pup

=== Action figures ===
- Mahabali Shaka
- Jasoos Chakram
- Dynamite
- Jimmy Hendricks

=== Foreign characters (licensed) ===
- Phantom
- Flash Gordon
- Mandrake
- James Bond
- He-Man
- Tarzan
- Spider-Man
- Superman
- Batman
- Archie Andrews
- Jughead Jones
- Garfield

=== Advertisements/endorsement/TV series ===
- Shaktimaan (Based on the popular TV serial for children, Shaktimaan starring Mukesh Khanna, an Indian Superhero.)
- Rasna Genie (Rasna is one of the biggest drinks in India.)
- Kapil Dev (Prithvi Ke Rakshak - Action Grahvasi) (Comic produce as an ad campaign for Action Shoes)
- Big Babool Children (Distributed free with Perfetti's popular Big Babool Bubble Gum)
- Captain Vyom (Comic version of a space adventure TV series of the same name starring Milind Soman in the title role)

=== 3D comics ===
- Diamond Comics 3D Series

== List of Diamond Comics ==
DC#	Character / Series	Name	Artist	Writer
1	लम्बू - मोटू	लम्बू - मोटू मुर्दों की बस्ती में	A. S. Chitrak	Gulshan Rai
2	चाचा - भतीजा	चाचा - भतीजा और जादुई चिराग	Ravi Kohli	Rajiv
3	मामा - भांजा	मामा - भांजा और चतुर खरगोश	Sukhjeet Singh	
4	फौलादी सिंह	फौलादी सिंह और लौह मानव	Baldev Singh	Rajiv
5	लम्बू - मोटू	लम्बू - मोटू स्मगलरों के बीच में	A. S. Chitrak	
6	चाचा - भतीजा	चाचा - भतीजा और खतरनाक जादूगर		
7	मामा - भांजा	मामा - भांजा और चतुर गीदड़		
8	फौलादी सिंह	फौलादी सिंह और विचित्र अंडा	Baldev Singh	
9	लम्बू - मोटू	लम्बू - मोटू और मौत का कुआ	A. S. Chitrak	
10	चाचा - भतीजा	चाचा - भतीजा और विचित्र दानव		
11	मामा - भांजा	मामा - भांजा और चतुर केकड़ा		
12	फौलादी सिंह	फौलादी सिंह और डालौर का अंत	Baldev Singh	
13	राजन - इकबाल	राजन - इकबाल और अद्भुत मानव	Sukhwant	S. C. Bedi
14	चाचा - भतीजा	चाचा - भतीजा और तिलिस्मी समुद्र		
15	मामा - भांजा	मामा - भांजा और इमानदार चोर	Sukhjeet Singh	Prem Kishore
16	फौलादी सिंह	फौलादी सिंह और अन्तरिक्ष के डाकू	Baldev Singh	
17	राजन - इकबाल	राजन - इकबाल और लाल हवेली का प्रेत	Sukhwant	S. C. Bedi
18	चाचा - भतीजा	चाचा - भतीजा और तिलस्मी तलवार		
19	मामा - भांजा	मामा - भांजा और सिक्खों के दस गुरु (प्रथम भाग)	Sukhjeet Singh	Prem Kishore
20	फौलादी सिंह	फौलादी सिंह और उड़न तस्तरी का रहस्य	Baldev Singh	
21	लम्बू - मोटू	लम्बू - मोटू और खतरनाक चिट्ठी	Pramod Ganpate	Rajiv
22	फौलादी सिंह	फौलादी सिंह और अंतरिक्ष यानों के चोर	Baldev Singh	
23	चाचा चौधरी	चाचा चौधरी अन्तरिक्ष में		
24	राजन - इकबाल	राजन - इकबाल और मुर्दा डाकू का आतंक	Sukhwant	S. C. Bedi
25	चाचा - भतीजा	चाचा - भतीजा और जम्बू से टक्कर		
26	फौलादी सिंह	फौलादी सिंह और समुद्र नगर	Baldev Singh	
27	मामा - भांजा	मामा - भांजा और जातक कथाएँ		
28	राजन - इकबाल	राजन - इकबाल और मौत का फंदा	Sukhwant	S. C. Bedi
29	चाचा चौधरी	चाचा चौधरी और आदमखोर		
30	लम्बू - मोटू	लम्बू - मोटू और अंतरिक्ष में सैर	Rita Nayyar	
31	चाचा - भतीजा	चाचा - भतीजा और पर्वत देवता		
32	फौलादी सिंह	फौलादी सिंह और खतरनाक षड़यंत्र	Anupam Sinha	
33	राजन - इकबाल	राजन - इकबाल और खूनी अड्डा	Sukhwant	S. C. Bedi
34	लम्बू - मोटू	लम्बू - मोटू और डाकुओं के लुटेरे		
35	चाचा चौधरी	चाचा चौधरी और साबू का अपहरण		
36	मामा - भांजा	मामा - भांजा और अलीबाबा और चालीस चोर		
37	चाचा - भतीजा	चाचा - भतीजा और नील मणि		
38	राजन - इकबाल	राजन - इकबाल और नकाबपोश ब्लैकमेलर	Sukhwant	S. C. Bedi
39	लम्बू - मोटू	लम्बू - मोटू और भयानक ऑक्टोपस		
40	फौलादी सिंह	फौलादी सिंह और परमाणु बम्ब के चोर	Anupam Sinha	
41	चाचा चौधरी	चाचा चौधरी और बैंक के लुटेरे		
42	फौलादी सिंह	फौलादी सिंह का शिकंजा	Anupam Sinha	
43	चाचा - भतीजा	चाचा - भतीजा और जालिम जादूगरनी		
44	मामा - भांजा	मामा - भांजा और मुग़ल खानदान		
45	राजन - इकबाल	राजन - इकबाल और इंटरनेश्नल गैंग	Sukhwant	S. C. Bedi
46	लम्बू - मोटू	लम्बू - मोटू और नीलगढ़ी का खज़ाना	Sudhir Tailang	
47 77 number fuladi singer	फौलादी सिंह	फौलादी सिंह और पृथ्वी के चोर	Baldev Singh	
48	राजन - इकबाल	राजन - इकबाल और मौत से टक्कर	Sukhwant	S. C. Bedi
49	ताऊ जी	ताऊ जी और जादू का डंडा		
50	बिल्लू	बिल्लू - 1		
51	फौलादी सिंह	फौलादी सिंह और शैतान टारविल	Anupam Sinha	
52	चाचा चौधरी	कराटे सम्राट		
53	मामा - भांजा	मामा - भांजा और राजपूतों के जौहर		
54	लम्बू - मोटू	लम्बू - मोटू और रहस्यमय हत्यारा		
55	चाचा - भतीजा	चाचा - भतीजा और मायावी राक्षस		
56	राजन - इकबाल	राजन - इकबाल और मूर्ति के चोर	Sukhwant	S. C. Bedi
57	राजन - इकबाल	राजन - इकबाल और मूर्ति का रहस्य	Sukhwant	S. C. Bedi
58	फौलादी सिंह	फौलादी सिंह और टारविल से टक्कर	Anupam Sinha	
59	बिल्लू	बिल्लू - 2		
60	ताऊ जी	ताऊ जी और जादूगर साम्बा		
61	चाचा चौधरी	चाचा चौधरी और अकबरी खज़ाना		
62	लम्बू - मोटू	लम्बू - मोटू और तिरंगे के दुश्मन		
63	चाचा - भतीजा	चाचा - भतीजा और मौत की घाटी		
64	फौलादी सिंह	फौलादी सिंह और कारकोला का चक्रव्यूह		
65	राजन - इकबाल	राजन - इकबाल और खज़ाने के दीवाने	Ajay Bhardwaj	S. C. Bedi
66	मामा - भांजा	मामा - भांजा और जादुई कलम		
67	चाचा चौधरी	चाचा चौधरी की गब्बर सिंह से टक्कर		
68	लम्बू - मोटू	लम्बू - मोटू और वतन के मतवाले	Sudhir Tailang	Ashwani (Ashu)
69	राजन - इकबाल	राजन - इकबाल और कब्रिस्तान के चोर	Sukhwant	S. C. Bedi
70	चाचा - भतीजा	चाचा - भतीजा और अन्तरिक्ष के बौने		
71	फौलादी सिंह	फौलादी सिंह अजनबी ग्रह में		
72	मामा - भांजा	मामा - भांजा और जादुई मूर्ती		
73	चाचा चौधरी	चाचा चौधरी - बोतल का जिन्न		
74	लम्बू - मोटू	लम्बू - मोटू की ड्रैक्युला से टक्कर		
75	बिल्लू	बिल्लू - 3		
76	ताऊ जी	ताऊ जी और लालची जादूगर		
77	फौलादी सिंह	फौलादी सिंह और अन्तरिक्ष में तबाही		
78	चाचा - भतीजा	चाचा - भतीजा और दाढ़ी वाली बुढिया		
79	राजन - इकबाल	राजन - इकबाल और खून पीने वाले	Ajay Bhardwaj	S. C. Bedi
80	मामा - भांजा	मामा - भांजा और बीरबल की 77 सूझभूझ		
81	चाचा चौधरी	चाचा चौधरी और शिकारी लक्कड़बग्घा सिंह		
82	लम्बू - मोटू	लम्बू - मोटू और गद्दारों की टोली		
83	फौलादी सिंह	फौलादी सिंह और ग्लोब का आतंक		
84	चाचा - भतीजा	चाचा - भतीजा और प्रेतों की रानी		
85	लम्बू - मोटू	लम्बू - मोटू और गद्दारों का विनाश		
86	फौलादी सिंह	फौलादी सिंह और ड्रीमलैंड का बादशाह		
87	राजन - इकबाल	राजन - इकबाल और खतरनाक खेल	Sukhwant	S. C. Bedi
88	मामा - भांजा	मामा - भांजा और इन्कलाब के पुजारी		
89	पिंकी	पिंकी की नानी की कहानी		
90	चाचा चौधरी	चाचा चौधरी और साबू पे हमला		
91	फौलादी सिंह	फौलादी सिंह और अन्तरिक्ष में संग्राम		
92	मोटू - पतलू	मोटू - पतलू और मछली का शिकार		
93	चाचा - भतीजा	चाचा - भतीजा और पाताल लोक		
94	मोटू - पतलू	मोटू - पतलू और एशियन गेम्स		
95	ताऊ जी	ताऊ जी और तिलिस्मी षड़यंत्र		
96	पिंकी	पिंकी और मुफ्त के बेर		
97	राजन - इकबाल	राजन - इकबाल और काला शैतान	Sukhwant	S. C. Bedi
98	मामा - भांजा	मामा - भांजा और जादुई तालाब		
99	युद्ध चित्र कथा	लहू मांगे इन्साफ		
100	चाचा चौधरी	चाचा चौधरी और राका		
101	फौलादी सिंह	फौलादी सिंह और विनाश के पुजारी		
102	युद्ध चित्र कथा	अब वतन आज़ाद है		
103	लम्बू - मोटू	लम्बू - मोटू और धरती का संग्राम		
104	चाचा - भतीजा	चाचा - भतीजा और बंदरो का देश		
105	मोटू - पतलू	मोटू - पतलू और भूत महल		
106	राजन - इकबाल	राजन - इकबाल और नकली नोट	Sukhwant	S. C. Bedi
107	युद्ध चित्र कथा	माटी मांगे खून		
108	पिंकी	पिंकी और साबुन के बुलबुले		
109	लम्बू - मोटू	लम्बू - मोटू और मौत का युद्ध		
110	मामा - भांजा	मामा - भांजा और चालाक बनिया		
111	युद्ध चित्र कथा	माटी मेरे देश की		
112	चाचा चौधरी	चाचा चौधरी साबू काले टापू में		
113	फौलादी सिंह	फौलादी सिंह और अन्तरिक्ष का भगवान		
114	मोटू - पतलू	मोटू - पतलू पागल खाने में		
115	युद्ध चित्र कथा	धरती मांग रही बलिदान		
116	बिल्लू	बिल्लू का हंगामा		
117	ताऊ जी	ताऊ जी और शकराल की राजकुमारी		
118	राजन - इकबाल	राजन - इकबाल और खतरनाक मुजरिम	Ajay Bhardwaj	
119	युद्ध चित्र कथा	वतन की कसम		
120	चाचा - भतीजा	चाचा - भतीजा और मौत का गीत		
121	लम्बू - मोटू	लम्बू - मोटू और नर्क का ड्रैकुला		
122	फौलादी सिंह	फौलादी सिंह और सितारों का युद्ध		
123	युद्ध चित्र कथा	मेरा वतन मेरा चमन		
124	मोटू - पतलू	मोटू - पतलू और हीरों का द्वीप		
125				
126	ढब्बू जी	ढब्बू जी नेता बनने चले		
127	युद्ध चित्र कथा	नहीं बिकेगी ये धरती		
128	पिंकी	पिंकी और दादा जी का अख़बार		
129	मामा - भांजा	मामा - भांजा और चौबे जी का जूता		
130	लम्बू - मोटू	लम्बू - मोटू और मौत का बादशाह		
131	कैप्टेन विकास	कैप्टेन विकास और डैथ मिरर		
132				
133	चाचा - भतीजा	चाचा - भतीजा और खतरनाक यन्त्र		
134	ताऊ जी	ताऊ जी और अत्याचारी का आतंक		
135	कैप्टेन विकास	कैप्टेन विकास और अंतरिक्ष में सर्वनाश		
136	मोटू - पतलू	मोटू - पतलू और मौत का जाल {Reprint 696}		
137				
138	चाचा चौधरी	चाचा चौधरी और रहस्यमय चोर		
139	फौलादी सिंह	फौलादी सिंह और डार्क लैण्ड का शैतान		
140	लम्बू - मोटू	लम्बू - मोटू और सरहद की ज्वाला		
141	मामा - भांजा	मामा - भांजा और कंजूस सेठ		
142	बिल्लू	बिल्लू और गर्मी की छुट्टियाँ		
143	मोटू - पतलू	मोटू - पतलू बौनों के देश में		
144	रमन	रमन दस लाख की लाटरी		
145	मामा - भांजा	मामा - भांजा और दस अवतार		
146	राजन - इकबाल	राजन - इकबाल और सफ़ेद बिल्ली	Jugal Kishore	
147	लम्बू - मोटू	लम्बू - मोटू और युद्ध की आग		
148	ढब्बू जी	ढब्बू जी और बुद्धू राम		
149	मामा - भांजा	मामा - भांजा और बातूनी औरत		
150	रमन	रमन हम एक हैं		
151				
152	चाचा चौधरी	चाचा चौधरी - साबू का बूट		
153	मोटू - पतलू	मोटू - पतलू और गुफा का खज़ाना		
154	पिंकी	पिंकी और बंगाली रसगुल्ले		
155	ताऊ जी	ताऊ जी और सोनपरी का अपहरण		
156	चाचा चौधरी	चाचा चौधरी - क्रिकेट मैच		
157	मामा - भांजा	मामा - भांजा और भैंस की पूँछ		
158	राजन - इकबाल	राजन - इकबाल और आठ करोड़ का हीरा		
159***	ताऊ जी	ताऊ जी और पूँछ वाला दैत्य		
160	चाचा - भतीजा	चाचा - भतीजा और पत्थर की देवी		
161	फौलादी सिंह	फौलादी सिंह और छिपकली का प्रतिशोध		
162	लम्बू - मोटू	लम्बू - मोटू और मौत से संग्राम		
163	मामा - भांजा	मामा - भांजा और दस अवतार		
164	पिंकी	पिंकी और झपट जी की पतंग		
165				
166	राजन - इकबाल	राजन - इकबाल और चौराहे के कातिल		
167	चाचा चौधरी	चाचा चौधरी अमेरिका में		
168	मोटू - पतलू	मोटू - पतलू और उड़न-तश्तरी		
169***	ताऊ जी	ताऊ जी और पूँछ वाला दैत्य		
170				
171	मामा - भांजा	मामा - भांजा और ताऊ जी की मूंछ		
172	बिल्लू	बिल्लू की सोफ्टी		
173	फौलादी सिंह	फौलादी सिंह और चक्रव्यूह का मसीहा		
174	राजन - इकबाल	राजन - इकबाल और भूतिया खंडहर		
175				
176	चाचा चौधरी	चाचा चौधरी और साबू की शादी		
177				
178	लम्बू - मोटू	लम्बू - मोटू और वतन के पहरेदार		
179	रमन	रमन और पड़ोसी का चूहा		
180	मोटू - पतलू	मोटू - पतलू और पागल घसीटा		
181	लम्बू - मोटू	लम्बू - मोटू और सरहद के अंगारे		
182	चाचा - भतीजा	चाचा - भतीजा और तिलिस्मी फूल		
183	छोटू - लम्बू	छोटू - लम्बू और हीरा		
184	ढब्बू जी	ढब्बू जी पागल बने		
185	मामा - भांजा	मामा - भांजा और महामूर्ख पिल्लू		
186				
187	चाचा चौधरी	चाचा चौधरी का धमाका		
188	फौलादी सिंह	फौलादी सिंह और डिक्टेटर की तबाही		
189	लम्बू - मोटू	लम्बू - मोटू - दो दीवाने		
190	महाबली शाका	महाबली शाका और अजनबी शिकारी		
191				
192	ताऊ जी	ताऊ जी और तिलस्मी खंजर		
193	मोटू - पतलू	मोटू - पतलू और परियों का हंगामा		
194	पिंकी	पिंकी और मियां चिलगोजा		
195	राजन - इकबाल	राजन - इकबाल और काला भेड़िया		
196	छोटू - लम्बू	छोटू - लम्बू और बांके बिहारी		
197	मामा - भांजा	मामा - भांजा और लंगडी चुड़ैल		
198***	चाचा - भतीजा	चाचा - भतीजा और नागिन राजकुमारी		
199	रमन	रमन का टेलीविजन		
200	चाचा चौधरी	चाचा चौधरी और राका की वापसी		
201	ताऊ जी	ताऊ जी और रुमझुम का हंगामा		
202	लम्बू - मोटू	लम्बू - मोटू और कानून का हत्यारा		
203	फौलादी सिंह	फौलादी सिंह का आखिरी संग्राम		
204	पिंकी	पिंकी और मल्लिका का खिताब		
205	मोटू - पतलू	मोटू - पतलू और चेलाराम का अपहरण		
206	ढब्बू जी	ढब्बू जी और चंदू लाल		
207	राजन - इकबाल	राजन - इकबाल और विचित्र अपराधी	Ruby	
208				
209***	चाचा - भतीजा	चाचा - भतीजा और मटकी चुड़ैल		
210	रमन	रमन सर्कस में		
211	छोटू - लम्बू	छोटू - लम्बू की अनोखी सजा		
212	मामा - भांजा	मामा - भांजा और बेईमान नाटे चंद		
213	राजन - इकबाल	राजन - इकबाल और अपराधी का चैलेन्ज	Ruby	
214	चाचा चौधरी + बिल्लू + पिंकी	चाचा चौधरी बिल्लू और पिंकी		
215	लम्बू - मोटू	लम्बू - मोटू और पिशाच मानव		
216	चाचा - भतीजा	चाचा - भतीजा और बौना राक्षस		
217	फौलादी सिंह	फौलादी सिंह और अंतरिक्ष की प्रेतात्मा		
218	मोटू - छोटू	मोटू - छोटू और मूछों का कमाल		
219	महाबली शाका	महाबली शाका और अफ्रीका का दैत्य		
220	बिल्लू	बिल्लू पिकनिक पर		
221	मोटू - पतलू	मोटू - पतलू और खोटी किस्मत		
222	ताऊ जी	ताऊ जी और लाठी वाला दानव		
223	3D	चिम्पू, पिकलू और भोलू गोलू		
224	अंडेराम - डंडेराम	अंडेराम - डंडेराम और खटारा कार		
225	जासूस चक्रम	जासूस चक्रम और अनोखा ब्लैक मेलर		
226	महाबली शाका	महाबली शाका और दैत्यों का खज़ाना		
227	चाचा चौधरी	चाचा चौधरी और हाथी का व्यापार		
228	राजन - इकबाल	राजन - इकबाल और डम डम का हंगामा		
229	छोटू - लम्बू	छोटू - लम्बू और देश के दुश्मन		
230	आलतूराम - फालतूराम	आलतूराम - फालतूराम चले सुबह की सैर		
231	चिम्पू	चिम्पू और नीली गुफाओं का दैत्य		
232	मामा - भांजा	मामा - भांजा और मंत्री का बेटा		
233	पिंकी	पिंकी और चैरिटी का टिकेट		
234	चाचा - भतीजा	चाचा - भतीजा और सोने का शेर		
235	मोटू - पतलू	मोटू - पतलू और खजाने की खोज		
236	फौलादी सिंह	फौलादी सिंह और धुएं की औरत		
237	3D	जंगल की रानी		
238	लम्बू - मोटू	लम्बू - मोटू और पत्थर की लाश		
239	महाबली शाका	महाबली शाका और काला बाज़/मौत का देवता {Reprint # 0291}		
240	अण्डेराम डण्डेराम	अण्डेराम डण्डेराम और होटल में हंगामा		
241	रमन	रमन और मसाला डोसा		
242	3D	भयानक मौत		
243	चाचा चौधरी	चाचा चौधरी और चंपत संपत {Reprint No. 1893}		
244	राजन - इकबाल	राजन - इकबाल और बौने कातिल		
245	ताऊ जी	ताऊ जी और लकड़ी का बन्दर		
246	मोटू - छोटू	मोटू - छोटू और मकड़ दादा		
247	3D	अनोखा चिड़िया घर		
248	पिंकी	पिंकी का रंगीन केमरा		
249	मोटू - पतलू	मोटू - पतलू और जंगल में मंगल		
250	महाबली शाका + 3D	महाबली शाका और जन्नत महल		
251	चिम्पू	चिम्पू और कातिलों की टोली		
252	मामा - भांजा	मामा - भांजा और बुद्धुराम		
253	हास्य चित्र कथा	महाचोर		
254	छोटू - लम्बू	छोटू - लम्बू और मिस्टर एक्स		
255	चाचा चौधरी	चाचा चौधरी और उड़ने वाली कार		
256	फौलादी सिंह	फौलादी सिंह और मौत की धरती		
257	राजन - इकबाल	राजन - इकबाल और डम डम का कमाल		
258	रमन	रमन की दाढ़ी		
259	चाचा - भतीजा	चाचा - भतीजा और सर्प भवानी		
260	लम्बू - मोटू	लम्बू - मोटू और खतरनाक मिशन		
261	महाबली शाका	महाबली शाका और बौनों का संग्राम		
262	पिंकी	पिंकी की पूसी		
263	ताऊजी	ताऊजी और चाँदी का किला		
264	मोटू - पतलू	मोटू - पतलू और अंगूठी का हंगामा {Reprint # 1141 # 1614}		
265	राजन - इकबाल	राजन - इकबाल और अनोखा इंतकाम		
0266***	छोटू - लम्बू	छोटू - लम्बू और अंजाना अपराध		
267	चाचा चौधरी	चाचा चौधरी - साबू का हथोड़ा		
268	रमन	रमन और रहस्यमय खजाना		
269	चाचा - भतीजा	चाचा - भतीजा और बनमानुष का रहस्य		
270	फौलादी सिंह	फौलादी सिंह और अन्तरिक्ष की अप्सरा		
271	चाचा चौधरी	चाचा चौधरी - पतीले की कमर		
272	ताऊ जी	ताऊ जी और जादुई सेब		
273	ढब्बू जी	ढब्बू जी और उलटी गंगा		
274	फौलादी सिंह	फौलादी सिंह और स्वर्ग के भगवान		
275	बिल्लू	बिल्लू का होमवर्क		
276	मोटू - पतलू	मोटू - पतलू और मुफ्त का कुत्ता		
277	पिंकी	पिंकी का पिल्ला		
278	लम्बू - मोटू	लम्बू - मोटू और किले की तबाही		
279	राजन - इकबाल	राजन - इकबाल और सांपो का सौदागर		
280	चाचा चौधरी	चाचा चौधरी और पोपटलाल		
281	ताऊ जी	ताऊ जी और जादूगर नागमणि		
282	छोटू - लम्बू	छोटू - लम्बू और अद्भुत ड्रम		
283	चन्नी चाची	चन्नी चाची		
284	चाचा - भतीजा	चाचा - भतीजा और हत्यारी तलवार		
285	मामा - भांजा	मामा - भांजा और अंधी औरत		
286	रमन	रमन और चौक छक्का		
287	मोटू - पतलू	मोटू - पतलू और जूते का हंगामा		
288	राजन - इकबाल	राजन - इकबाल और कानी औरत		
289	छोटू - लम्बू	छोटू - लम्बू और स्पाईडर डैन		
290	चाचा चौधरी	चाचा चौधरी और हकीम जमालगोटा		
291	महाबली शाका	महाबली शाका और मौत का देवता Reprint of 239		
292	चाचा - भतीजा	चाचा - भतीजा और कातिल मशीने		
293	फौलादी सिंह	फौलादी सिंह और जहरीला षड़यंत्र		
294	लम्बू - मोटू	लम्बू - मोटू और डाक्टर अफलातून		
295	राजन - इकबाल	राजन - इकबाल और खूनी दरिंदे		
296	ताऊ जी	ताऊ जी और बोतल में बंद वैज्ञानिक		
297	मोटू - पतलू	मोटू - पतलू और लाइट हाउस		
298	महाबली शाका	महाबली शाका और खण्डहर के शैतान		
299	लम्बू - मोटू	लम्बू - मोटू और पागलों का बादशाह		
300	चाचा चौधरी	चाचा चौधरी और राका का इंतकाम		
301	रमन	रमन और पोप म्यूजिक		
302	चाचा - भतीजा	चाचा - भतीजा और महामाया का जाल		
303	मामा - भांजा	मामा - भांजा और बांसुरी का कमाल		
304	चन्नी चाची	चन्नी चाची का फोटो		
305	ताऊ जी	ताऊ जी और चाण्डाल मणि		
306	महाबली शाका	महाबली शाका और स्पाइडर किंग		
307	दाबू	दाबू और विशाल बंदर		
308	राजन - इकबाल	राजन - इकबाल और चाँदी का पुतला		
309	फौलादी सिंह	फौलादी सिंह और पागल रोबोट		
310	अंडेराम - डंडेराम	अंडेराम - डंडेराम और चोखे चाचा		
311	मोटू - पतलू	मोटू - पतलू और लाखों के हीरे		
312	बिल्लू	बिल्लू हॉस्टल में		
313	चाचा - भतीजा	चाचा - भतीजा और पानी का दैत्य		
314	ढब्बूजी	ढब्बूजी और दांतों का डॉक्टर		
315	आलतूराम - फालतूराम	आलतूराम - फालतूराम और सुपर स्टार		
316	छोटू - लम्बू	छोटू - लम्बू और जम्बू		
317	चाचा चौधरी	चाचा चौधरी और हीरों की खेती		
318	ताऊ जी	ताऊ जी और जादूगर नरहरी		
319	लम्बू - मोटू	लम्बू - मोटू और डायना का षड़यंत्र		
320	जासूस चक्रम	जासूस चक्रम और नकली भगवान		
321	फौलादी सिंह	फौलादी सिंह और सितारों का दुश्मन		
322	पिंकी	पिंकी और हातिमताई		
323	राजन - इकबाल	राजन - इकबाल और चाबी का रहस्य		
324	मामा - भांजा	मामा - भांजा और मुर्ख कुत्ता		
325	रमन	रमन का स्कूटर		
326	ताऊ जी	ताऊ जी और चार हाथों वाला राक्षस		
327	महाबली शाका	महाबली शाका और पाताल के दानव		
328	दाबू	दाबू और खतरनाक कैप्सूल		
329	मोटू - पतलू	मोटू - पतलू और डॉक्टर झटका		
330	फौलादी सिंह	फौलादी सिंह और आपरेशन मर्डरलैंड		
331	चन्नी चाची	चन्नी चाची का मोटापा		
332	छोटू - लम्बू	छोटू - लम्बू और खुनी चमगादड़		
333	चाचा - भतीजा	चाचा - भतीजा और सर्प दानव		
334	ताऊ जी	ताऊ जी और कालचक्र		
335***	रमन	रमन का कूलर		
335***	मामा - भांजा	मामा - भांजा और बौने राजा		
0336***	राजन - इकबाल	राजन - इकबाल और डाक्टर डॉन		
0336***	लम्बू - मोटू	लम्बू - मोटू और अनोखी साज़िश		
337	फौलादी सिंह	फौलादी सिंह और पारस के चोर		
338	मोटू - पतलू	मोटू - पतलू और बेचारा घसीटाराम		
339	चाचा - भतीजा	चाचा - भतीजा और हत्यारा जिन्न		
340***	महाबली शाका	महाबली शाका और भूखे भेड़िये		
341	दाबू	दाबू और अप्सरा की मूर्ति		
342	लम्बू मोटू	लम्बू मोटू और ब्लैक शैडो		
343	मामा - भांजा	मामा - भांजा और दयालू दानव		
344	रमन	रमन हिलस्टेशन पर		
345	छोटू - लम्बू	छोटू - लम्बू और नशे के सौदागर		
346	ताऊ जी	ताऊ जी और रुमझुम का अपहरण		
347	फौलादी सिंह	फौलादी सिंह और मायावी सुंदरी		
348	राजन - इकबाल	राजन - इकबाल और बंगला न० 420		
349	लम्बू - मोटू	लम्बू - मोटू और एक करोड़ की गोली		
350	चाचा चौधरी	चाचा चौधरी और मैडम जारो		
351	मीकू	मीकू और अखरोट		
352	मामा - भांजा	मामा - भांजा और पैदल राम		
353	पिंकी	पिंकी और जोकर		
354	दाबू	दाबू और जादूगर पाशा		
355	चाचा - भतीजा	चाचा - भतीजा और रहस्यमय दानव		
356	महाबली शाका	महाबली शाका और शैतान भिखारी		
357	ताऊ जी	ताऊ जी और मौत का घेरा		
358	मोटू - छोटू	मोटू - छोटू बने डॉक्टर		
359	मोटू - पतलू	मोटू - पतलू और तूफ़ान से टक्कर		
360	बिल्लू	बिल्लू का दोस्त		
361	मामा - भांजा	मामा - भांजा और पंच परमेश्वर		
362	राजन - इकबाल	राजन - इकबाल और काली चिड़ियों का बादशाह		
363	फौलादी सिंह	फौलादी सिंह और पृथ्वी पर हंगामा		
364	रमन	रमन का ताऊ		
365	चन्नी चाची	चन्नी चाची का पडोसी		
366	ताऊ जी	ताऊ जी और खोपड़ी का रहस्य		
367	छोटू - लम्बू	छोटू - लम्बू और शेर का हंगामा		
368	मिकी और अंकल विनायक	रॉन 333		
369	राजन - इकबाल	राजन = इकबाल और दौलत के पुजारी		
370	चाचा चौधरी	चाचा चौधरी और रोबोट		
371	ढब्बू जी	ढब्बू जी और चोर उचक्के		
372	महाबली शाका	महाबली शाका और नाग का खजाना		
373	रमन	रमन की पेंट		
374	चाचा - भतीजा	चाचा भतीजा और मरघट की रानी		
375	मामा - भांजा	मामा - भांजा और यमराज की हार		
376	फौलादी सिंह	फौलादी सिंह और परोपकारी पिशाच		
377	पिंकी	पिंकी और छू -मंतर		
378	महाबली शाका	महाबली शाका और नाग मंदिर		
379	लम्बू - मोटू	लम्बू - मोटू और राडार स्टेशन		
380	ताऊ जी	ताऊ जी और जादू की देवी		
381	मीकू	मीकू और बेचारा शेरखान		
382	मामा - भांजा	मामा - भांजा और अनोखी शर्त		
383	मोटू - पतलू	मोटू - पतलू और विचित्र नगरी		
384	फौलादी सिंह	फौलादी सिंह और गुप्त घाटी		
385	चाचा चौधरी	चाचा चौधरी और गुलामों की बिक्री		
386	महाबली शाका	महाबली शाका और रहस्यमय नगरी		
387	चाचा - भतीजा	चाचा - भतीजा और दुष्ट महाकाल		
388	राजन - इकबाल	राजन - इकबाल और कातिल किंग		
389	रमन	रमन की कार		
390	मामा - भांजा	मामा - भांजा और जादू की गुफा		
391	मोटू - पतलू	मोटू - पतलू और अनमोल खज़ाना		
392	फौलादी सिंह	फौलादी सिंह और इंद्रजाल		
393		लव कुश		
394	चन्नी चाची	चन्नी चाची का फिल्मी कुत्ता		
395	ताऊ जी	ताऊ जी और अटकन झटकन		
396	लम्बू - मोटू	लम्बू - मोटू और गुनाहों का बादशाह		
397	राजन - इकबाल	राजन - इकबाल और डायमंड किंग		
398	मामा - भांजा	मामा - भांजा और चालबाज शेर		
399	मोटू - पतलू	मोटू - पतलू और शौकिया होटल		
400	चाचा चौधरी	राका से मुठभेड़		
401	महाबली शाका	महाबली शाका और पाताल दानव		
402	पिंकी	पिंकी के मम्मी पापा		
403	चाचा - भतीजा	चाचा - भतीजा और उड़ने वाली छिपकली		
404	फौलादी सिंह	फौलादी सिंह और शैतानो की टोली		
405	मोटू - छोटू	मोटू - छोटू और खजाने की लूट		
406	राजन - इकबाल	राजन - इकबाल और अदभुत डकैती		
407	छोटू - लम्बू	छोटू - लम्बू और भिखारी का प्रेत		
408	बिल्लू	बिल्लू और फिल्म शो		
409	मोटू - पतलू	मोटू - पतलू और फिल्म की शूटिंग		
410	मामा - भांजा	मामा - भांजा और ड्रैकुला जादूगर		
411	ताऊ जी	ताऊ जी और अनोखी साजिश		
412	ढब्बू जी	ढब्बू जी के धमाके		
413	महाबली शाका	महाबली शाका और तोप का कमाल		
414		क्रिकेट कैसे खेलें?		
415	चाचा चौधरी	चाचा चौधरी का इंसाफ		
416	फौलादी सिंह	फौलादी सिंह और अंतरिक्ष के सम्राट		
417	छोटू - मोटू	छोटू - मोटू और रहस्यमय नकाबपोश		
418	राजन - इकबाल	राजन - इकबाल और मौत का नाच		
419	लम्बू - मोटू	लम्बू - मोटू और अजनबी कातिल		
420	जासूस चक्रम	जासूस चक्रम और पार्सल का रहस्य		
421	रमन	रमन और रोलर स्केट		
422	चाचा - भतीजा	चाचा - भतीजा और अघोरी तांत्रिक		
423	मोटू - पतलू	मोटू - पतलू और खौफनाक डाकू		
424	महाबली शाका	महाबली शाका और देश की अमानत		
425	पिंकी	पिंकी और टू इन वन		
426	ताऊ जी	ताऊ जी और अनोखी परीक्षा		
427	फौलादी सिंह	फौलादी सिंह और अंतरिक्ष के डाकू		
428	लम्बू - मोटू	लम्बू - मोटू और अजगरों की गुफा		
429	मामा - भांजा	मामा - भांजा और भैंस की पूंछ		
430	चाचा चौधरी	चाचा चौधरी और हाइवे के लुटेरे		
431	चाचा - भतीजा	चाचा - भतीजा और सिंह मानव		
432	महाबली शाका	महाबली शाका और नशे के गुलाम		
433	मामा - भांजा	मामा - भांजा और चतुर बनिया		
434	लम्बू - मोटू	लम्बू - मोटू और गुप्त मिशन		
435	रमन	रमन और खलीफा का कुर्ता		
436	ताऊ जी	ताऊ जी और विनाशकारी मानव		
437	छोटू - मोटू	छोटू - मोटू और डॉक्टर फंटूश		
438	राजन - इकबाल	राजन - इकबाल और मौत के वारिस		
439	दाबू	दाबू और शीरी		
440	मामा - भांजा	मामा - भांजा और मूर्ख होशियार सिंह		
441	फौलादी सिंह	फौलादी सिंह और अन्तरिक्ष का महात्मा		
442	चाचा - भतीजा	चाचा - भतीजा और चार चोर		
443	चाचा चौधरी	चाचा चौधरी - अरमान अली फरमान अली		
444	महाबली शाका	महाबली शाका और गुप्त घाटी		
445	मोटू - छोटू	मोटू - छोटू और हवेली का भूत		
446	ताऊ जी	ताऊ जी और अनोखा शैतान		
447	लम्बू - मोटू	लम्बू - मोटू और शैतान कोबरा		
448	रमन	रमन और दस का नोट		
449	ताऊ जी	ताऊ जी और सोनपरी का अपहरण		
450	मामा - भांजा	मामा - भांजा और किस्मत का तीर		
451	मोटू - पतलू	मोटू - पतलू और खूनी दरिंदे		
452	फौलादी सिंह	फौलादी सिंह और पागल सम्राट		
453	पिंकी	पिंकी और कुंदनलाल पगड़ीवाला		
454	लम्बू - मोटू	लम्बू - मोटू और फौलादी हाथ		
455	महाबली शाका	महाबली शाका और स्पाई स्टेशन		
456	ताऊ जी	ताऊ जी और मौत की दलदल		
457	मोटू - छोटू	मोटू - छोटू और शादी का चक्कर		
458	चाचा चौधरी	चाचा चौधरी और एक करोड़ का हीरा		
459	चाचा - भतीजा	चाचा - भतीजा और मियां पानसेन		
460	मामा - भांजा	मामा - भांजा और चार मूर्खों की दास्तान		
461	फौलादी सिंह	फौलादी सिंह और महाविनाश		
462	चिम्पू	चिम्पू और खूनी तस्कर		
463	बिल्लू	बिल्लू और हाथी की सैर		
464	ताऊ जी	ताऊ जी और मुर्दा राजकुमारी		
465	मोटू - छोटू	मोटू - छोटू और बैंक लुटेरा		
466	लम्बू - मोटू	लम्बू - मोटू और क़त्ल की वारदात		
467	महाबली शाका	महाबली शाका और शैतान मुजरिम		
468				
469	चाचा - भतीजा	चाचा - भतीजा और अनोखा अपहरण		
470	पिंकी	पिंकी और चाचा सुलेमानी		
471	मोटू - पतलू	मोटू - पतलू और करोडों की जायदाद		
472	राजन - इकबाल	राजन - इकबाल और चार्ली चोर		
473	फौलादी सिंह	फौलादी सिंह और शैतानों का मंदिर		
474	ढब्बू जी	ढब्बू जी और चंदू लाल		
475	चाचा चौधरी	चाचा चौधरी और युधिष्ठिर का मुकुट {Reprint No. 1900}		
476	ताऊ जी	ताऊ जी और शैतान का चेला		
477	महाबली शाका	महाबली शाका और अग्नि मानव		
478	चिम्पू	चिम्पू और खतरनाक साजिश		
479	लम्बू - मोटू	लम्बू - मोटू और अपराधी की खोज		
0480***	मामा - भांजा	मामा - भांजा और कंजूस सेठ		
0480***	रमन	रमन और खलीफा की शादी		
481				
482	दाबू	दाबू समुद्र में		
483	चाचा - भतीजा	चाचा - भतीजा और चीनी जादूगर		
484	महाबली शाका	महाबली शाका और अग्नि मानव की तबाही		
485***	राजन - इकबाल	राजन - इकबाल और जहरीले सौदागर		
485***	पिंकी	पिंकी का जन्मदिन		
486	ताऊ जी	ताऊ जी और लालची जादूगर		
487	मामा - भांजा	मामा - भांजा और बालक का बलिदान		
488	राजन - इकबाल	राजन - इकबाल और ब्लैक स्नेक		
489	फौलादी सिंह	फौलादी सिंह और लम्बू का अपहरण		
490	चाचा - भतीजा	चाचा - भतीजा और नागलोक की यात्रा		
491	महाबली शाका	महाबली शाका और पाप की देवी		
492	लम्बू - मोटू	लम्बू - मोटू और बोलती खोपड़ी		
493	मियां मिटठू हीरामन	मियां मिटठू हीरामन और कैमरे का रहस्य		
494	बिल्लू	बिल्लू और रावण के सिर		
495	ताऊ जी	ताऊ जी और मतस्य मानव		
496	राजन - इकबाल	राजन - इकबाल और खूंखार आतंकवादी		
497	मोटू - छोटू	मोटू - छोटू और पागल कुत्ता		
498	फौलादी सिंह	फौलादी सिंह और खतरनाक संपोला		
499	लम्बू - मोटू	लम्बू - मोटू फांसी के फंदे पर		
500	चाचा चौधरी	राका का तूफ़ान		
501	रमन	रमन और कुम्भकरण की नींद		
502	चन्नी चाची	चन्नी चाची का चित्रहार		
503	चाचा - भतीजा	चाचा - भतीजा और ठगसेन		
504	महाबली शाका	महाबली शाका और तिलस्मी तावीज		
505	चाचा चौधरी	चाचा चौधरी और शेख इब्नबतूता		
506	ताऊ जी	ताऊ जी और दैत्य का आतंक		
507	चिम्पू	चिम्पू और नकाबधारी शत्रु		
508	फौलादी सिंह	फौलादी सिंह और पाताल लोक की रानी		
509	राजन - इकबाल	राजन - इकबाल और हत्यारा पत्थर		
510	पिंकी	पिंकी और विश्व रिकॉर्ड		
511	महाबली शाका	महाबली शाका और खून के व्यापारी		
512	मोटू - छोटू	मोटू - छोटू की समुद्री यात्रा		
513	चाचा - भतीजा	चाचा - भतीजा और तिलस्मी कैदखाना		
514	लम्बू - मोटू	लम्बू - मोटू और विमान दुर्घटना		
515				
516	रमन	रमन की छतरी		
517	दाबू	दाबू और नरभक्षी पेड़		
518	चाचा - भतीजा	चाचा - भतीजा और काला टापू		
519	राजन - इकबाल	राजन - इकबाल और बूटी का रहस्य		
520	फौलादी सिंह	फौलादी सिंह और पृथ्वी के दुश्मन		
521	जासूस चक्रम	जासूस चक्रम और पार्सल का रहस्य		
522	बिल्लू	बिल्लू फाइव स्टार होटल में		
523	महाबली शाका	महाबली शाका और अनोखा अपहरण		
524	लम्बू - मोटू	लम्बू - मोटू और सोने का गुलदस्ता		
525	ताऊजी	ताऊजी और चीनी तस्कर		
526	मामा - भांजा	मामा - भांजा और निर्धन ब्राह्मण		
527	पिंकी	पिंकी और रुस्तम		
528	राजन - इकबाल	राजन - इकबाल और आधी रात का हंगामा		
529	फौलादी सिंह	फौलादी सिंह और डॉक्टर डेविल		
530	चिम्पू	चिम्पू और अँधेरे का राजा		
531	मोटू - छोटू	मोटू - छोटू और संदूक का रहस्य		
532	चाचा - भतीजा	चाचा - भतीजा और इच्छाधारी साँप		
533				
534				
535	चाचा चौधरी	चाचा चौधरी और चोर की तलाश		
536	महाबली शाका	महाबली शाका और गुलामों का द्धीप		
537	लम्बू - मोटू	लम्बू - मोटू और प्रतिशोध के अंगारे		
538	मामा - भांजा	मामा - भांजा और चमत्कारी रोबोट		
539	जेम्स बाण्ड	007 जेम्स बाण्ड-1 {जेम्स बाण्ड और पोलस्टार पेट्रोलियम कम्पनी}		
540	मोटू - छोटू	मोटू - छोटू और मूंछों का कमाल		
541	बिल्लू	बिल्लू का केक		
542	ताऊ जी	ताऊ जी और कुबड़ी का मायाजाल		
543	चाचा - भतीजा	चाचा - भतीजा और महाकाल की पुजारिन		
544	चिम्पू	चिम्पू और शत्रु की चाल		
545	जेम्स बाण्ड	007 जेम्स बाण्ड-2 {जेम्स बाण्ड - जियो और मरने दो }		
546	चाचा चौधरी	चाचा चौधरी और बनारसी ठग		
547	महाबली शाका	महाबली शाका और नागदेवता का अपहरण		
548	मामा - भांजा	मामा - भांजा और काठ का पुतला		
549	चाचा - भतीजा	चाचा - भतीजा और महाकाल का अंत		
550	जेम्स बाण्ड	007 जेम्स बाण्ड-3 {जेम्स बाण्ड - बदले कि आग} Reprint No. 1928		
551	Historical	चाणक्य		
552				
553				
554				
555	राजन - इकबाल	राजन - इकबाल और खंडहरों का प्रेत		
556				
557	पिंकी	पिंकी के जूते		
558				
559				
560				
561				
562	मामा - भांजा	मामा - भांजा और गधा राजकुमार		
563	लम्बू - मोटू	लम्बू - मोटू और हत्यारा वकील		
564				
565				
566				
567				
568				
569	फौलादी सिंह	फौलादी सिंह और रहस्यमय धमाके		
570	चाचा चौधरी	चाचा चौधरी जुपिटर पर		
571				
572				
573	जेम्स बाण्ड	007 जेम्स बाण्ड-4 {जेम्स बाण्ड - सितारों की आग }		
574	दाबू	दाबू और जांगो		
575	बिल्लू	बिल्लू और बजरंगी पहलवान		
576	ताऊ जी	रहस्यमय छुटकी		
577	महाबली शाका	महाबली शाका और मौत का दूत		
578	मामा - भांजा	मामा - भांजा और विचित्र छापामार		
579				
580	पिंकी	पिंकी की गुडिया		
581	फौलादी सिंह	फौलादी सिंह और नीली आंधी		
582	छोटू - मोटू	छोटू - मोटू और भयानक षड़यंत्र		
583				
584	चाचा - भतीजा	चाचा - भतीजा और शैतान वैज्ञानिक		
585	जाब	जाब और पूर्ण चंद्रमा की रात		
586				
587	चाचा चौधरी	प्रो० शटलकोक		
588	महाबली शाका	महाबली शाका और जालिम जंगूरा		
589				
590				
591	ताऊ जी	ताऊ जी और जादूगर ताराकीमो		
592				
593	दाबू	दाबू और अन्तरिक्ष यात्रियों का अपहरण		
594	फौलादी सिंह	फौलादी सिंह और तबाही के दूत {Reprint No. 1555, 1816}		
595				
596				
597	ताऊ जी	ताऊ जी और ताराकीमो का अंत		
598				
599				
600	चाचा चौधरी	चाचा चौधरी - राका का हमला		
601	पिंकी	पिंकी और स्कूल की घंटी		
602	बिल्लू	बिल्लू और करोड़ रूपये		
603	मामा - भांजा	मामा - भांजा और बेवकूफ औरत		
604	लम्बू - मोटू	लम्बू - मोटू और अपराधियों का शहंशाह		
605				
606				
607				
608				
609				
610				
611	फौलादी सिंह	फौलादी सिंह और अंतरिक्ष में तबाही		
612	राजन - इकबाल	राजन - इकबाल और भटकती आत्मा		
613	महाबली शाका	महाबली शाका और खतरनाक लूसा		
614	ताऊ जी	ताऊ जी और महाबली शकराल		
615				
616				
617				
618	चाचा चौधरी	चाचा चौधरी और सड़क का भूत		
619	फौलादी सिंह	फौलादी सिंह और शून्य का घेरा		
620				
621	दाबू	दाबू और जकारियस सम्राट		
622				
623				
624	चन्नी चाची	चन्नी चाची की दुनिया		
625	जेम्स बाण्ड	007 जेम्स बाण्ड-7		
626	महाबली शाका	महाबली शाका और जंगल के गद्दार		
627	रमन	रमन और लिफ्ट		
628	छोटू - लम्बू	छोटू - लम्बू और लखना डकैत		
629	मामा - भांजा	मामा - भांजा और चालाक गिलहरी		
630				
631	रमन	रमन और चमत्कारी तेल		
632				
633				
634	राजन - इकबाल	राजन - इकबाल और डैड मैन		
635	मामा - भांजा	मामा - भांजा और हुनरमंद लड़का		
636	फौलादी सिंह	फौलादी सिंह और गद्दार रोबोट		
637				
638				
639	चाचा चौधरी	चाचा चौधरी और चालाक गोशा		
640				
641	फौलादी सिंह	फौलादी सिंह और पारस के चोर		
642				
643	बिल्लू	मिस्टर इंडिया		
644	चिम्पू	चिम्पू और सोने के तस्कर		
645				
646				
647	फौलादी सिंह	फौलादी सिंह और अंतरिक्ष का नगर		
648	दाबू	खजाने के लुटेरे		
649	महाबली शाका	महाबली शाका और नागरत्न का हंगामा		
650	चाचा चौधरी	साबू का वतन		
651	रमन	रमन और चमत्कारी तेल		
652				
653	चिम्पू	चिम्पू और ऑपरेशन गोल्ड स्टार		
654	राजन - इकबाल	राजन - इकबाल और मौत के व्यापारी		
655	मामा - भांजा	मामा - भांजा और कामयाब तरकीब		
656	पिंकी	पिंकी और मिटठू		
657				
658	फौलादी सिंह	फौलादी सिंह और अंतरिक्ष में विष्फोट		
659				
660				
661				
662				
663				
664				
665				
666				
667				
668	जेम्स बाण्ड	007 जेम्स बाण्ड-10 {जेम्स बाण्ड - नाग देवी }		
669				
670	अण्डेराम डण्डेराम	अण्डेराम डण्डेराम का अजूबा		
671	चाचा चौधरी	चाचा चौधरी और गाजा{gaza}		
672	फौलादी सिंह	फौलादी सिंह और समुद्र में हंगामा		
673	लम्बू - मोटू	लम्बू - मोटू और उल्लू का प्रेत		
674	ताऊ जी	ताऊ जी और मौत का मंत्र		
675	छोटू - लम्बू	छोटू - लम्बू और सुपर डुपर मैन		
676				
677				
678	मोटू - पतलू	मोटू - पतलू और लाइट हाउस		
679	महाबली शाका	महाबली शाका और लोहे का शैतान		
680	पिंकी	पिंकी और चोकलेट टोफ्फियाँ		
681	दाबू	दाबू और बिओ पकान के बौने		
682				
683	राजन - इकबाल	राजन - इकबाल और लाल मारुती		
684				
685				
686	फौलादी सिंह	फौलादी सिंह और ब्लैक होल		
687	चाचा - भतीजा	चाचा - भतीजा और साँपों का महल		
688				
689	मामा - भांजा	मामा - भांजा और लोमड़ी का जादू		
690	रमन	बीमा एजेंट		
691				
692				
693				
694	मामा - भांजा	मामा - भांजा और आलसी ब्राह्मण		
695				
696	मोटू - पतलू	Reprint of 136		
697				
698	रमन	रमन और विडियो कैसेट		
699	फौलादी सिंह	फौलादी सिंह और डॉ० जॉन का आतंक		
700	चाचा चौधरी	चाचा चौधरी और ट्रिपल नाइन		
701	चाचा - भतीजा	चाचा - भतीजा और शीशे का लोटा		
702	लम्बू - मोटू	लम्बू - मोटू और बर्फ का दैत्य		
703	स्पाईडर-मैन	स्पाईडर-मैन - 1		
704	बिल्लू	बिल्लू की तोप		
705				
706				
707	फौलादी सिंह	फौलादी सिंह और हाडकू		
708	स्पाईडर-मैन	स्पाईडर-मैन - 2		
709	चाचा चौधरी	चाचा चौधरी - सम्राट अशोक का खजाना		
710	अग्निपुत्र - अभय	अग्निपुत्र - अभय और फंडारा {Agniputra Abhay aur Fandara}		
711				
712	ताऊ जी	पागल रुमझुम		
713	श्रीमती जी	श्रीमती जी - 01		
714	चाचा चौधरी	चाचा चौधरी और विचित्र चिड़िया घर		
715	अग्निपुत्र - अभय	अग्निपुत्र - अभय और ओईंग चिक पैंग		
716				
717				
718				
719	जेम्स बाण्ड	007 जेम्स बाण्ड-13 {जेम्स बाण्ड - 007 और रहस्यमयी परी}		
720	पिंकी	कुटकुट गिलहरी		
721				
722	फौलादी सिंह	फौलादी सिंह और शैतान अदनान		
723				
724				
725				
726	श्रीमती जी	शादी की वर्षगाँठ		
727	रमन	रमन और मकान		
728				
729				
730				
731				
732	अग्निपुत्र - अभय	अग्निपुत्र - अभय और टोमांगो		
733	चाचा चौधरी	चाचा चौधरी और फिल्म स्टार		
734	फौलादी सिंह	फौलादी सिंह और ऐसीटोमा का विचित्र मानव		
735				
736	महाबली शाका	महाबली शाका और खूनी चमगादड़		
737				
738	चाचा - भतीजा	चाचा - भतीजा और समुद्री शैतान		
739	रमन	रमन और राम लीला		
740				
741	जेम्स बाण्ड	007 जेम्स बाण्ड-14 {जेम्स बाण्ड - प्रेतो का आतंक भाग-1}		
742				
743				
744	राजन - इकबाल	राजन - इकबाल और पांडवों का खज़ाना		
745	मोटू - छोटू	मोटू - छोटू और सुपर स्टार		
746	फौलादी सिंह	फौलादी सिंह और लावासुर		
747				
748	बिल्लू	बिल्लू और क्रिकेट		
749	लम्बू - मोटू	लम्बू - मोटू और परमाणु रिएक्टर		
750				
751	महाबली शाका	महाबली शाका और शैतान से मुठभेड़		
752				
753				
754	राजन - इकबाल	राजन - इकबाल और चालाक किंग		
755				
756	मामा - भांजा	मामा - भांजा और दूध कुमार की नानी		
757	ताऊ जी	ताऊ जी और मुर्दों का मसीहा		
758				
759				
760				
761				
762				
763				
764				
765				
766	चाचा - भतीजा	चाचा - भतीजा और इंतकाम का अंजाम		
767				
768	फौलादी सिंह	फौलादी सिंह और जानसन {Janasan}		
769				
770	श्रीमती जी	श्रीमती जी और तोहफा		
771				
772	मामा - भांजा	मामा - भांजा और कोड़ों की मार		
773				
774	लम्बू - मोटू	लम्बू - मोटू और जालिम शैतान		
775				
776	जाब	जाब और कंसकोन		
777	चाचा - भतीजा	चाचा - भतीजा और जादूगर पाताल फोड़		
778	फौलादी सिंह	फौलादी सिंह और महायात्रा		
779	राजन - इकबाल	राजन - इकबाल और आजादी के दुश्मन		
780				
781				
782				
783				
784	पिंकी	पिंकी और तितली		
785				
786				
787				
788				
789	फौलादी सिंह	फौलादी सिंह और ब्लुनिया		
790	जेम्स बाण्ड	007 जेम्स बाण्ड-20		
791	डायनामाइट	डायनामाइट		
792				
793				
794				
795	मैनड्रेक-17	मैनड्रेक-17		
796	मैनड्रेक-18	मैनड्रेक-18		
797	जेम्स बाण्ड	007 जेम्स बाण्ड-21		
798				
799	अग्निपुत्र - अभय+फौलादी सिंह+महाबली शाका+फैण्टम	अग्निपुत्र - अभय और महासंग्राम		
800	चाचा चौधरी	राका का चैलेंज		
801				
802	स्पाईडर-मैन	स्पाईडर-मैन - 3 {अद्भुत स्पाईडर-मैन + अजेय लौह मानव : उगते सूर्य की रात}		
803	बिल्लू	बिल्लू और गर्मियों की छुट्टियाँ		
804	चाचा चौधरी	जहरीला इंसान नोरा		
805				
806	फौलादी सिंह	फौलादी सिंह और खतरनाक दुल्हन		
807				
808	मैनड्रेक-19	मैनड्रेक - विचित्र हत्यारे		
809	अग्निपुत्र - अभय	अग्निपुत्र - अभय और चुम्ब चुम्बा		
810	डायनामाइट	ज्वालामुखी		
811	रमन	डॉक्टर साहब		
812	श्रीमती जी	श्रीमती जी और चूहा		
813				
814	रसना जीनी	रसना जीनी और टारविल		
815	चाचा चौधरी	चाचा चौधरी और बिंग बेन		
816	पिंकी	पिंकी का नया फ्रोक		
817	जेम्स बाण्ड	007 जेम्स बाण्ड-23 {जेम्स बाण्ड - तूफान का अंत}		
818	स्पाईडर-मैन	स्पाईडर-मैन - 4		
819				
820				
821	महाबली शाका	महाबली शाका और वर्दी वाले भूत		
822	मैनड्रेक-20	मैनड्रेक और हवा में युद्ध		
823	रमन	रमन और डिश एंटीना		
824	श्रीमती जी	श्रीमती जी हिल स्टेशन पर		
825				
826	डायनामाइट	विस्फोट		
827	फौलादी सिंह	फौलादी सिंह दुश्मन के जाल में		
828	जेम्स बाण्ड	007 जेम्स बाण्ड-24 {जेम्स बाण्ड - बहुमूल्य हीरे }		
0829***	मैनड्रेक-21 Or 22***	मैनड्रेक-21 Or 22***		
830	मोटू - छोटू	मोटू - छोटू और एक रूपये की मुसीबत		
831				
832	राजन - इकबाल	राजन - इकबाल और समुद्र का जलजला		
833	फौलादी सिंह	फौलादी सिंह और महाचालबाज		
834	महाबली शाका	महाबली शाका और कालनूर की तबाही		
835				
836				
837				
838				
839	बिल्लू	बिल्लू की साइकिल		
840	अग्निपुत्र - अभय	अग्निपुत्र - अभय और आलराऊंडर		
841				
842	रसना जीनी	रसना जीनी और यती		
843	चाचा चौधरी	चाचा चौधरी और रेम्बो		
844				
845	ताऊ जी	ताऊ जी और अन्तरिक्ष से बुलावा		
846	लम्बू - मोटू	लम्बू - मोटू और इंस्पेक्टर की हत्या		
847	महाबली शाका	महाबली शाका और जिंग डोंग {zing dong}		
848				
849	फौलादी सिंह	फौलादी सिंह और लक्कड़ बग्घा		
850	पिंकी	पिंकी की पिकनिक		
851				
852				
853	ताऊ जी	ताऊ जी और मोक्रा		
854	जेम्स बाण्ड	007 जेम्स बाण्ड-27		
855	मैनड्रेक-24	मैनड्रेक-24		
856				
857				
858				
859				
860	जेम्स बाण्ड	007 जेम्स बाण्ड-28 {जेम्स बाण्ड - रहस्यमय बक्सा}		
861	मैनड्रेक-25	मैनड्रेक-25		
862				
863				
864	ताऊ जी	ताऊ जी और नरकवासी शैतान		
865				
866				
867				
868				
869	चाचा चौधरी	चाचा चौधरी और स्कॉटलैंड यार्ड		
870				
871	फौलादी सिंह	फौलादी सिंह और आतंक दूत		
872	जाब	जाब और सूर्यदूत		
873	लम्बू - मोटू	लम्बू - मोटू और मौत के खिलाडी		
874	महाबली शाका	महाबली शाका और आदमखोर जंगली		
875	चाचा - भतीजा	चाचा - भतीजा और काली दुनिया		
876				
877				
878	अग्निपुत्र - अभय	अग्निपुत्र - अभय और ब्लैक बाल		
879	श्रीमती जी	श्रीमती जी और साडी		
880				
881				
882	महाबली शाका	महाबली शाका और जंगल का राक्षस		
883	बिल्लू	बिल्लू और टेडी बीयर		
884	जेम्स बाण्ड	007 जेम्स बाण्ड-31		
885	ताऊ जी	ताऊ जी और आत्मा का अपहरण		
886	फौलादी सिंह	फौलादी सिंह और परछाई का हंगामा		
887				
888				
889				
890	फौलादी सिंह	फौलादी सिंह और गोटार		
891				
892				
893				
894				
895	जेम्स बाण्ड	007 जेम्स बाण्ड-32 {जेम्स बाण्ड - रूसी जासूसों से मुठभेड } Reprint No. 1563		
896				
897				
898	चाचा चौधरी	चाचा चौधरी और पोप शो		
899	बिल्लू	बिल्लू की साइकिल		
900	चाचा चौधरी	चाचा चौधरी और राका का खेल		
901	महाबली शाका	महाबली शाका और विष डंकिनी		
902	चाचा चौधरी	चाचा चौधरी और बंदरों का देश		
903	बिल्लू	बिल्लू और सैर सपाटा		
904	डायनामाइट	तेज़ाब		
905				
906				
907				
908	फौलादी सिंह	फौलादी सिंह और आपरेशन जिब्रान		
909	लम्बू - मोटू	लम्बू - मोटू और मास्टर प्लान		
910				
911				
912				
913	चाचा चौधरी	चाचा चौधरी और अफलातून		
914				
915				
916				
917				
918				
919	डायनामाइट	मौत के मुहूँ में		
920	फौलादी सिंह	फौलादी सिंह और फोल्डिंग मैन		
921	चाचा - भतीजा	चाचा - भतीजा और राजा की आजादी		
922				
923				
924				
925				
926	चाचा चौधरी	चाचा चौधरी और राका का खेल		
927				
928	महाबली शाका	महाबली शाका और सिकरा {Sikra}		
929				
930	राजन - इकबाल	राजन - इकबाल और क्लेरो {Claro}		
931	मोटू - छोटू	मोटू - छोटू और अनोखा द्वीप		
932				
933	जेम्स बाण्ड	007 जेम्स बाण्ड-37 {जेम्स बाण्ड - आपरेशन डैथ विंग}		
934				
935				
936				
937	चन्नी चाची	चन्नी चाची की घुड़सवारी		
938	डायनामाइट	क्राइम यूनियन		
939				
940	चाचा - भतीजा	चाचा - भतीजा और खूनी शैतान		
941	फौलादी सिंह	फौलादी सिंह और मैडम स्टेनलेस		
942	बिल्लू	बिल्लू और फिल्म की हीरोइन		
943	अग्निपुत्र - अभय	अग्निपुत्र - अभय और स्कोर्पियन		
944	चाचा - भतीजा	चाचा - भतीजा और कुटुम्बा का मायाजाल		
945				
946	राजन - इकबाल	राजन - इकबाल और हत्यारा टिकट		
947	मामा - भांजा	मामा - भांजा और सूर्यकान्ति		
948	मैनड्रेक-36	मैनड्रेक - अंधेरो का बादशाह + मिटठू और बेईमन कछुआ		
949				
950				
951				
952	फौलादी सिंह	फौलादी सिंह और कैक्टस क्वीन		
953				
954				
955	लम्बू - मोटू	शैतान जाग उठा		
956				
957				
958				
959				
960				
961				
962				
963				
964	राजन - इकबाल	राजन - इकबाल और लंगड़ा कंकाल		
965	पिंकी	पिंकी की नाव		
966				
967				
968				
969				
970				
971				
972	राजन - इकबाल	राजन - इकबाल और जांग जूं जा		
973	चाचा चौधरी	चाचा चौधरी और वर्ल्ड कप		
974				
975				
976	चाचा - भतीजा	चाचा - भतीजा और दानवलोक में हंगामा		
977				
978				
979	फौलादी सिंह	फौलादी सिंह और ग्रैण्ड मास्टर		
980				
0981***	बिल्लू	बिल्लू का स्कूल		
0981***	रमन	रमन की मुर्गी		
982				
983				
984				
985				
986				
987				
988	महाबली शाका	महाबली शाका और ब्लैक टाईगर		
989				
990				
991	फौलादी सिंह	फौलादी सिंह और मशीनी अमिताभ		
992				
993				
994				
995				
996	रमन	रमन और हा हा		
997				
998	चाचा चौधरी	चाचा चौधरी टोक्यो में		
999				
1000	चाचा चौधरी	चाचा चौधरी - राका की तबाही		
1001	डायनामाइट	मौत का तूफ़ान		
1002				
1003				
1004				
1005	चाचा चौधरी	चाचा चौधरी और देहरादून एक्सप्रेस		
1006	चाचा चौधरी	चाचा चौधरी और चमत्कारी इत्र		
1007				
1008				
1009				
1010	दाबू	दाबू और चंगेजखान का खजाना		
1011				
1012				
1013	बिल्लू	बिल्लू की बहादुरी		
1014				
1015				
1016				
1017				
1018				
1019				
1020				
1021				
1022	पिंकी	पिंकी और बगीचा		
1023				
1024				
1025	डायनामाइट	वन मैन आर्मी		
1026				
1027				
1028				
1029	बिल्लू	बिल्लू और अच्छा पड़ोसी		
1030				
1031	बिल्लू	बिल्लू और जोजी		
1032				
1033				
1034				
1035	मोटू - पतलू	मोटू - पतलू और खूनी दरिन्दे		
1036				
1037				
1038				
1039				
1040				
1041	डायनामाइट	पोस्टमार्टम		
1042	फौलादी सिंह	फौलादी सिंह और ब्रह्माण्ड भक्षी		
1043				
1044				
1045				
1046				
1047				
1048				
1049	लम्बू - मोटू	लम्बू - मोटू और मि० ग्रेजुएट		
1050	चिम्पू	चिम्पू और गरुड़ देवता		
1051				
1052				
1053	अग्निपुत्र - अभय	अग्निपुत्र - अभय और मौत का जलजला		
1054				
1055	पिंकी	पिंकी मिस वर्ल्ड		
1056				
1057	फौलादी सिंह	फौलादी सिंह और अंतरिक्ष के शैतान		
1058				
1059				
1060				
1061				
1062				
1063				
1064				
1065				
1066	चाचा चौधरी	चाचा चौधरी और चमत्कारी इत्र		
1067				
1068				
1069				
1070				
1071	फौलादी सिंह	फौलादी सिंह और अनोखा षड़यंत्र		
1072				
1073				
1074				
1075	राजन - इकबाल	राजन - इकबाल और ठगराज छगन		
1076				
1077				
1078	अग्निपुत्र - अभय	अग्निपुत्र - अभय और डायनासोर		
1079				
1080	बिल्लू	बिल्लू और स्टंट मेन		
1081	चाचा चौधरी	चाचा चौधरी और चमत्कारी मुर्गी		
1082				
1083	चाचा - भतीजा	Chacha Bhatija Aur Jhikando Ka Chakravahuy		
1084	लम्बू - मोटू	लम्बू - मोटू और नटवर लाल		
1085	ताई जी	ताई जी और चालाक पड़ोसन		
1086	फौलादी सिंह	Fauladi Singh aur Surama Kritonse		
1087	चाचा चौधरी	चाचा चौधरी और सोने की ईंट		
1088				
1089				
1090	ताऊ जी	ताऊ जी और पिशाचों का षड़यंत्र		
1091				
1092				
1093	सोनी - संपत	सोनी - संपत और कोट		
1094				
1095				
1096				
1097				
1098				
1099				
1100				
1101				
1102				
1103	सोनी - संपत	सोनी - संपत और प्रो० साहब		
1104				
1105				
1106				
1107				
1108				
1109				
1110	पिंकी	पिंकी और अंकल जी		
1111	फौलादी सिंह	फौलादी सिंह और टाइम बम्ब		
1112				
1113				
1114	बिल्लू	बिल्लू का समोसा		
1115				
1116				
1117				
1118				
1119				
1120				
1121	चाचा चौधरी	चाचा चौधरी और हिममानव		
1122				
1123				
1124				
1125				
1126				
1127				
1128	सोनी - संपत	सोनी - संपत और ब्यूटी क्वीन		
1129				
1130				
1131				
1132				
1133	मोटू - छोटू	मोटू - छोटू और हीरो नम्बर वन		
1134				
1135				
1136				
1137				
1138				
1139	पिंकी	पिंकी और मिसेज चमचम		
1140				
1141	मोटू - पतलू	Reprint of 264		
1142	चाचा - भतीजा	चाचा - भतीजा और शैतान का अंत		
1143	महाबली शाका	महाबली शाका और Doctor Qyuz		
1144				
1145				
1146	बिल्लू	बिल्लू और कर्नल साहब की दौड़		
1147	दाबू	दाबू और शादाब		
1148				
1149				
1150				
1151				
1152				
1153				
1154	डायनामाइट	डगलस दी ग्रेट		
1155	मोटू - पतलू	मोटू - पतलू और लाखों के हीरे		
1156	लम्बू - मोटू	लम्बू - मोटू और असली नकली		
1157	फौलादी सिंह	फौलादी सिंह और दानावासुर		
1158				
1159				
1160				
1161				
1162				
1163				
1164				
1165				
1166	चाचा चौधरी	चाचा चौधरी और आज का रॉबिनहुड		
1167				
1168	पिंकी	पिंकी और टोकन टोपी वाला		
1169				
1170				
1171	छोटू - लम्बू	छोटू - लम्बू और सुपर रोबोट		
1172				

== See also ==
- Pran Kumar Sharma
