= Cha Cha Cha Township =

Shopping center near Shurugwi, Zimbabwe

Cha Cha Cha Township simply known as Cha Cha Cha is a rural shopping centre in Shurugwi Rural Areas, 24 km South East of Shurugwi along the Beit Bridge road and 60 km (37 mi) from Gweru. The tarred road from 12 km before Shurugwi was constructed by a Chinese company called China-Gansui. It is considered strategically located for accessibility within the rural areas of Zimbabwe, therefore it can not be considered a remote area. It is relatively below standards with potholes experienced sinking in some stages, and was heavily affected by the floods during the summer of 2000.

The shopping centre, township as it is known in Zimbabwe, was at one stage bigger than some of the small towns such as Shurugwi and Zvishavane but things started deteriorating due to the economic meltdown experienced in the country.

== History ==
Cha Cha Cha was derived from the name of the hotel in the township which is called Happy Cha Cha Cha Hotel. It was known for organizing events that featured local Cha Cha Cha dancers. Cha Cha Cha was an administration centre for the Boers mainly of them farmers during its early days, but was later turned into a camp for the soldiers during the days of Ian Smith. The idea was to develop it into one of the biggest towns, if not cities since there was a hospital and an 'airport' nearby.

The original name was Donga Township, which was due to the vast number amount of dongas through that had been lost due to erosion. In 1980, it was renamed Herbert Chitepo Business Centre after the late liberation struggle hero but that name failed to be recognised.

== Main routes ==
It is at a confluence where major road routes meet. All traffic flows from Shurugwi on one road only to divert into different roads at Cha Cha Cha. The main road continues to Beit Bridge where traffic to Mashava and Masvingo will divert to the east while Zvishavane and Bulawayo will divert west-wards after 49 km. The Beit Bridge road will continue straight on.

== Other rural links ==
Roads to Pakame Mission will take the southwestern direction from Cha Cha Cha while the Tongogara route takes the Eastern direction. Tongogara High School is 17 km to the east while Pakame Mission is 20 km to the southwest. Hanke Mission is 20 km to the North. Vungwi Primary School is 2 km along the Tongogara road. Zvamabande Hospital is 2 km to the southeast, 1 km along the main Beit Bridge road, and 1 km off the highway to the east.

== Landing ground ==
There is a landing ground for small to medium airplanes. Mugabe makes use of it when he visits the area which happens once every 25 years, as in January 2006 he had only visited the area twice making him a generally unknown figure among the rural people who voted him into power. Due to the poor state of the dusty/dirty road, motorists have opened up several tracks through the landing area which is an even more clear sign of economic hardship.

== Main schools ==
Vungwi Primary School, Wida Primary School, Mhangami Primary School, Ndawora Primary, Mupangai Secondary School, and Rusununguko High School are all within 5 km from Cha Cha Cha Township.

== Main shops ==
The major business at Cha Cha Cha is retail. Most of the businessmen are general dealers, and two bakers are operating in the township and about four millers. Ganyani was traditionally the biggest shop due to its business diversity. There are also several bottle stores and two beer halls making it the 'only' best place to relax.

== Growth point statures ==
After the demise of Tongogara Township to be the growth point in Shurugwi mainly due to its location, the status was moved to Cha Cha Cha. This has seen a Post Office being opened at the centre and several supermarket chains have since tried their luck there. During the early years of the two townships, there was a competition to grow but Cha Cha Cha easily won it because of its location. There is only one bus route passing through Tongogara.

== Residential areas ==
After 1990 residential stands were allocated to develop a residential suburb-like area which was to kick start the development of Cha Cha Cha Township towards a town status but the economic conditions have hampered such aspirations. The combination of available facilities and improved access has established Cha Cha Cha as a functional regional center. Meanwhile, new residential buildings are being developed, with several companies locating their regional offices there.

== Surrounding villages ==
Mashoko, Marira, Mbengo, Ndanga, Ndawana, Mhangami, Kuziyamisa and others all are the sphere of influence of Cha Cha Cha Township.
