= Guruguru Mountain =

Mountain in Zimbabwe

Coordinates: 19.946726°S 30.092111°E

Guruguru Mountain is a solid dome-shaped volcanic rock in Shurugwi, Zimbabwe, near Pakame Mission. Guruguru, its Shona name, and Nkulunkulu, its Ndebele name, both mean "the biggest". It is by far the highest mountain in the Shurugwi Rural Areas and the Midlands Province of Zimbabwe.

Guruguru is a solid rock mountain formed when a volcanic eruption pushed lava up through a central core. It has a radius of over three kilometers and a height of over 500 meters. There is a spring of water at its summit. Little vegetation grows on the mountain except near the base.

Local people believe that the mountain is sacred.

For many years the cadet pilots in the RRAF (Royal Rhodesian Air Force) would climb it to paint their course number on the top. The tradition was that each course had to paint it twice the size of the previous course's number. For many years they could be read from miles away. It is under Chief Mpakami's jurisdiction.
