= Cha-Cha =

Cha-Cha, Cha Cha, ChaCha or Chacha may refer to:

== Music ==
- Cha-cha-cha (dance), a dance of Cuban origin
- Cha-cha-cha (music), a genre of Cuban music
- Cha Cha (album), a 1978 album by Herman Brood & His Wild Romance
- Cha Cha (soundtrack), the soundtrack for the 1979 film
- Cha Cha Real Smooth (EP), the film score from the 2022 film
- "Cha Cha Slide", a 2000 dance song by DJ Casper
- "Cha Cha" (song), a 2006 song by Latin artist, Chelo
- Cha Cha Cohen, 1990s band name

== People ==
- Benjamin Chaha (1940–2022), Nigerian politician
- Jaha Koo, South Korean artist whose given name is spelled "Chaha" in McCune–Reischauer romanization
- Jawaharlal Nehru (1889–1964), or Chacha Nehru, as he was known among the children.
- Yodo-dono (1569–1615), also known as Lady Chacha, a concubine of Hideyoshi Toyotomi
- Czarina Marie Guevara (born 1987), also known as DJ Chacha, cohost of Ted Failon at DJ Chacha sa Radyo5, a sister radio program for Failon Ngayon
- Shirley Muldowney (born 1940), former top fuel drag racer often referred to by the nickname "Cha Cha"
- Chacha Cricket (born 1949), famous Pakistani cricket fan, literally "Uncle Cricket"
- Cha Cha (rapper), American rapper
- Chacha Cañete (born 2004), Filipino actress
- Cha Cha Namdar (born 1956), nickname of Asghar Shadin Namdar, Iranian-American soccer player
- Cha Cha Malone (born 1987), nickname of Chase Vincent Malone, American entertainer
- Jose Cha Cha Jimenez (born 1948), American political activist
- José Rubens Chachá (born 1954), Brazilian actor, author and screenwriter
- Cha Cha, stage name of Cha Seung-woo (born 1978), South Korean singer and actor
- Serena ChaCha (born 1990), stagename of Myron Morgan, Panamanian-American drag performer and wig maker

== History ==
- Chacha Empire, Hindu empire which ruled over Sindh
- Chacha dynasty, Hindu Brahmin dynasty

== Books and films ==
- Cha Cha (film), a 1979 Dutch cult film
- Cha Cha Real Smooth, a 2022 American romantic dramedy film
- Chacha Chaudhary, an Indian comic book hero
- Chacha, a cartoon Chinese Internet police officer from Jingjing and Chacha
- Bubu Chacha, a Japanese anime series
- Akazukin Chacha or Red Riding Hood Chacha, a Japanese manga series created by Min Ayahana

== Places ==
- Chaha, Bushehr, village in Iran
- Chaha, Kohgiluyeh and Boyer-Ahmad, village in Iran
- Chacha (Shilka tributary), river in Russia, a Shilka tributary
- Mount Chacha, a mountain in Kunashiri, Japan

== Technology ==
- ChaCha (search engine), a search engine with a guided search function
- ChaCha (cipher), a stream cipher
- HTC ChaCha, a smartphone by HTC
- Cha-Cha, a method of creating stereo images by moving one camera along a sliding baseline; see Stereoscopy

== Other uses ==
- Chaha language, Gurage dialect of Ethiopia
- Extinct languages of northern Peru, the name sometimes given to the language of the Chachapoya people
- Chacha (brandy), a Georgian grape vodka
- Charter Change, a popular nickname for proposed amendments to the Constitution of the Philippines

== See also ==
- Cha-cha-cha (disambiguation)
- Chachi (disambiguation)
- Chacha Chaudhary (disambiguation), the Indian comic and its adaptations
- Chachas District, Areuipa, Peru
