= Chacha Chaudhary (disambiguation) =

Chacha Chaudhary is an Indian comic book character and series created by Pran Kumar Sharma and published by Diamond Comics.

Chacha Chaudhary may also refer to these adaptations:

- Chacha Chaudhary (2002 TV series), a live-action comedy television series
- Chacha Chaudhary (2019 TV series), an animated television series

== See also ==
- Chacha (disambiguation)
- Chowdhury, an Indian title and surname
