= Pow Pow =

Pow Pow may refer to:

- "Pow Pow" (song), 2010 song by American rock band LCD Soundsystem
- "Pow Pow", 2013 single by LPG (South Korean group)
- Christopher Powell (musician), 21st-century American drummer who performs under the stage name Pow Pow

== See also ==
- POW (disambiguation)
- Pao Pao (disambiguation)
- Bang Bang (disambiguation)
