= Everjoice Win =

Zimbabwean feminist activist

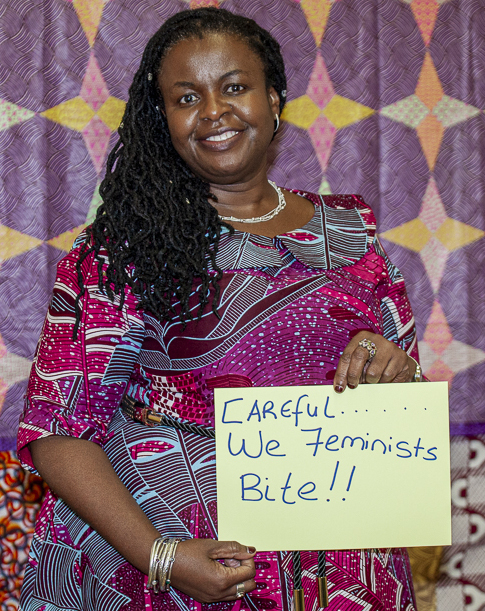
- Everjoice Win at the 4th Regional African Feminist Forum in Zimbabwe, 2016
- Born: 12 February 1965; Shurugwi, Rhodesia (now Zimbabwe)
- Died: 9 March 2025 (aged 60); Johannesburg, South Africa
- Other name: EJ
- Citizenship: Zimbabwean
- Education: University of Zimbabwe (BA Hons Economic History)
- Occupations: Feminist activist; writer; development practitioner
- Years active: 1989–2025
- Employer: ActionAid International
- Organizations: Women's Action Group; WiLDAF; National Constitutional Assembly; Crisis in Zimbabwe Coalition; AWID
- Known for: Women's rights advocacy; leadership in ActionAid International
- Notable work: To Live a Better Life; Beating Hunger, the Chivi Experience
- Title: International Programmes Director

Everjoice Win (12 February 1965 - 9 March 2025), known as EJ, was a Zimbabwean feminist activist, and the international programmes director of ActionAid International.

== Early life ==
Everjoice Win was born on 12 February 1965 in Shurugwi, Rhodesia (now Zimbabwe). In 1988, she earned a bachelor's degree in economic history from the University of Zimbabwe. She graduated with Honours in Economic History. Win began her development career with the Women’s Action Group, a feminist organisation in Zimbabwe focusing on women’s legal and health rights, where she served as Editor of their popular education publication SPEAK OUT/TAURAI/KHULUMANI. In the 1990s, she joined the Pan-African Women in Law and Development in Africa (WiLDAF), where she headed the Zimbabwe programme and helped African women’s rights organizations participate in international conferences including the Vienna Conference on Human Rights, the Copenhagen Social Summit, and the Beijing conference.

== Career ==
From 1989 to 1993, Win worked for Women's Action Group.

In 1992, together with Terri Barnes, Win published To Live a Better Life: An Oral History of Women in the City of Harare, 1930-70.

From 1993 to 1997, Win was programme director for the Zimbabwe chapter of Women in Law and Development in Africa (WiLDAF). In 1997, she was one of the founding members of the National Constitutional Assembly of Zimbabwe.

From 2002 to 2003, Win was the spokesperson for the Crisis in Zimbabwe Coalition.

From 2004 to 2007, Win was a board member of the Association of Women's Rights in Development (AWID), in Toronto, Canada.

Win was the international head/ international director of programmes and global engagement for ActionAid International since 2002. She was the International Programmes Director at ActionAid.

== Personal life ==
Win was based in Johannesburg, South Africa. She was known professionally and personally as “EJ” among colleagues and in feminist movements globally. Win was a writer, blogger, and active social media influencer who contributed to various print and online publications on women’s rights and social justice. In 2020, she was appointed Professor of Practice – Women’s Rights by the School of Oriental and African Studies (SOAS), University of London. She died on 9 March 2025 in Johannesburg, South Africa, aged 60.

== Publications ==
- To Live a Better Life: An Oral History of Women in the City of Harare, 1930-70 (Baobab Books, 1992)
- Beating Hunger, the Chivi Experience: A Community-Based Approach to Food Security in Zimbabwe (with Kuda Murwira, Cathy Watson, Clare Tawney, et al.) (Intermediate Technology Publications, 2000)
