= Pinki (comics) =

Indian comic book series

Pinki with her parents

Pinki (Hindi: पिंकी) a comics series by Diamond Comics characterizes a five-year-old girl. The Character of Pinki was created by Cartoonist Pran Kumar Sharma in year 1978. The comic is distributed in 10 languages. Pinki is often seen with her pet squirrel named Kut-Kut.

== Adaptation ==
In 2009, Diamond Comics—the owner of characters Chacha Chaudhary, Sabu, and Pinki—partnered with License India to develop an animated film.
