= Shurugwi =

Shurugwi mthambeka Thembisa
- Town
- Location of Shurugwi
- Coordinates: 19°40′S 30°00′E
- Country: Zimbabwe
- Province: Midlands Province
- Established: 1899
- Founder: British South Africa Company and Willoughby's Consolidated Company

Population (2022 census)
  - Total: 22,900
- Time zone: UTC+2 (CAT)
- Climate: Cwb

Shurugwi, originally known as Selukwe, is a small town and administrative centre in Midlands Province, southern Zimbabwe, located about 350 km (220 mi) south of Harare, with a population of 22,900 according to the 2022 census. The town was established in 1899 on the Selukwe Goldfield, which itself was discovered in the early 1890s, not long after the annexation of Rhodesia by the Pioneer Column.

The town lies in well wooded, hilly and picturesque country at an altitude of about 1,440 metres (4,720 ft) and is well watered having a typical annual rainfall of 890 millimetres (35 in). On a clear day, it is quite possible to see the hills around Masvingo and Great Zimbabwe, with the latter being over 145 km (90 mi) away.

== History ==
Selukwe was established in 1899 by the British South Africa Company and Willoughby's Consolidated Company. Its name was derived from the local Ndebele chief Selukwe Dlodlo, the brother of Somabhulane Dlodlo of Somabhula and Nalatale Dlodlo of the Great Dlodlo and Nalatale Ruins.

The district remains an important centre for gold, chrome and platinum mining, but it is perhaps best known as the home district of Ian Douglas Smith, a former Prime Minister of Rhodesia, who owned the 1,600 ha (4,000 acres) Gwenoro Farm near Gwenoro Dam.

== Industry and agriculture ==
The town is the terminus of a branch rail line from Gweru (formerly Gwelo), 32 km (20 mi) to the north. Shurugwi is one of Zimbabwe's largest producers of chrome; other metals also are mined there. Its healthful climate and scenic location attract tourists and retired people. The largest employers are ZIMASCO, Unki mine (a subsidiary of Anglo-American through its platinum wing, Angloplats), the government (through education), agriculture and health care.

Most farmers are peasant farmers who grow maize and other high grain-producing crops. Animal husbandry is also practised to some extent.

== Natural resources ==
The town is located on a mineral-rich Archaean greenstone belt, known in this area as the Selukwe Schist Belt, making it one of the most mineral-rich towns in the country. Chromite, gold and nickel are all mined around Shurugwi. The town is also located on one of the most beautiful places in Zimbabwe, Wolfshall Pass, commonly known as Boterekwa due to the winding of the road as it negotiates its way up and between mountains. This is very similar to the pass close to Louis Trichardt in South Africa since both were constructed by an Italian firm, the only difference being that there are tunnels in Louis Trichardt. It has been the scene of many road accidents, with most of them fatal. The most notable of these accidents occurred in 1966, when a bus load of students from Chrome Secondary School overturned; only three teachers survived the crash.

== Facilities ==
Most of the infrastructure in Shurugwi is old. There was only one hotel in the town center – the Grand Hotel, which used to operate as a bar before it was turned into a shop for building materials and motor spare parts. Slowly, the town of Shurugwi is being transformed to suit all kinds of business activities, contrary to its past as a gold trade center. The population have doubled compared to the previous decade. Apart from mining, it is now growing into an agriculture sector.

== Education ==
There are a number of schools in Shurugwi, including Parkinson High, Chrome High, Shurugwi 2, Batanai High School, Charles Wraith Primary, Railway Block Primary School, Peak Mine Primary, Selukwe Primary, Ironsides Primary Impali primary (Owned by Unkie Mineetc. Most of the better secondary schools are found in the Shurugwi rural area, such as Pakame Mission, one of the oldest schools in the country, a Methodist-run mission school which is about 40 km (25 mi) by road on the South towards Zvishavane, close to Guruguru Mountain, a volcanic solid rock mountain in Shurugwi Rural Areas; Tongogara High School, a government operated boarding school 40 km (25 mi) to the East and Hanke Adventist High School, an SDA run school 10 km (6.2 mi) on the North of Tongogara. Next to Hanke, there is a school called Svika High, named after a nearby Svika mountain, which are the rural areas of Francis Nhema, the Zanu Pf Member of Parliament for Shurugwi North. All these schools offer up to Advanced Level ("A-Level") education.

There also are some post-independence-era schools with basically poor standards of education, with pass rates of below 5% on Ordinary Level (O-levels), which is due to a lack of quality teachers who normally do not want to teach in rural areas. Rusununguko Secondary School, which is along the Chivi/Beit Bridge road, is one of the few schools to attain A-level status in its class.

Shurugwi also has rural primary schools, such as Vungwi Primary School, Matamba Primary School, Tumba Primary Schools, Dhlemiti Primary school, Chironde Primary school, Zvizhazha Primary School, Mavedzenge Primary School, Musavezi Primary School and Nhema Primary School. Most of the graduates leave Shurugwi after primary/secondary education to pursue further education, usually A levels, in other towns as far as Harare. A relative minority ultimately end up studying at the University of Zimbabwe and other post independent universities in Zimbabwe or even at universities abroad. Shurugwi has produced a considerable number of professionals, notably Chartered Accountants, lawyers, engineers and medical doctors. There is a private college Institute of Business Technology, popularly known as IBT College, founded by Dr Godfrey Gandawa, that offers academic school forms 1 to 6, and professional and computing courses at national foundation certificate, national certificate and national diploma levels with HEXCO examination status.

Mhangami Primary School is an Anglican church-run school. Originally called St Pius, it was renamed Mhangami in honour of the local Chief Mhangami. The school was established in 1943 and offers up to grade 7.

Shurugwi has quite a number of notable schools that drive the academic excellence of the town, which are notably:

- Selukwe Primary School
- Charles Wraith Primary School
- Railway Block Primary School
- Peak Mine Primary School
- Ironsides Primary School
- Shurugwi Chrome Secondary School
- Shurugwi 2 High School
- Parkinson High School
- Batanai High School
- Pakame High School
- Tongogara High School
- Rusununguko Secondary School
- Hanke Adventist High School
- Vungwi Primary School
- Matamba Primary School
- Tumba Primary Schools
- Dhlemiti Primary school
- Chironde Primary school
- Zvizhazha Primary School
- Mavedzenge Primary School
- Musavezi Primary School
- Nhema Primary School

== Notable residents ==
- Nyaradzo Mashayamombe, activist, musician and founder of Tag A Life International Trust
- Ian Smith, Prime Minister of Rhodesia and Member of Parliament of Zimbabwe
- Everjoice Win, feminist activist and the international programmes director of ActionAid
