= Unki mine =

Coordinates: 19.6246°S 30.0950°E

- Interactive map of Unki mine
- Location: Shurugwi, Midlands Province, Zimbabwe
- Products: platinum, palladium, rhodium, ruthenium, gold
- Company: Valterra Platinum

The Unki mine is an underground mine located in the central part of Zimbabwe in Shurugwi, Midlands Province. Unki represents one of the largest platinum reserves in Zimbabwe having estimated reserves of 34 million oz (964 tonnes) of platinum. The mine produces around 64,000 oz (1814 kg) of platinum/year.
