= Pao Pao (disambiguation) =

Pao Pao is a village on the island of Mo'orea in French Polynesia.

Pao Pao or Paopao may also refer to:

- "Pao Pao", a 1959 song by Monchito and His Mambo Royals
- "Pao Pao" (Kokkinou song), a 2000 hit by Elli Kokkinou
- Pao Pao, a story by Pier Vittorio Tondelli
- Pao Pao Bay, Mo'orea, Tahiti
- Paopao (canoe), a single-outrigger canoe made from a single log in the Pacific islands of Tuvalu
- Pao-pao ("Cannonball"), childhood nickname of Jackie Chan (born 1954), Hong Kong actor and filmmaker
- Joe Paopao (born 1955), American former quarterback and coach in the Canadian Football League
- Jordan Paopao (born 1986), American former offensive lineman and special teams coordinator and tight ends coach for the Washington Huskies
- Te-Hina Paopao (born 2002), American basketball player for the Atlanta Dream
