= Chhachi =

Chhachi may refer to:

- something of, from, or related to Chhachh, a region of Pakistan
- Chhachi dialect, an Indo-Aryan dialect of Punjab, Pakistan

== See also ==
- Chachi (disambiguation)
