= Pran Kumar Sharma =

Indian cartoonist (1938-2014)

- Born: 15 August 1938; Kasur, British India (present day Lahore, Pakistan)
- Died: 5 August 2014 (aged 75); Gurgaon, India
- Occupation: Cartoonist
- Known for: Creator of Chacha Chaudhary
- Awards: Padma Shri 2015

Pran Kumar Sharma (15 August 1938 – 5 August 2014), better known as Pran, was an Indian cartoonist best known as the creator of Chacha Chaudhary (1971). He also created other characters like Shrimatiji, Pinki, Billoo, Raman, and Channi Chachi.

== Early life and education ==
Born in Kasur, British India, in a Punjabi Hindu Brahmin family. Pran graduated with a BA from Gwalior and Master of Arts (Political Science) degree from evening Camp College, Delhi. He then pursued a five-year course in Fine Arts from Sir J. J. School of Art, Mumbai through distance as a private student while in Delhi, so that he could apply as a drawing teacher at schools, but he discontinued.

== Career ==
Pran began his career in 1960 as a cartoonist for the Delhi-based newspaper Milap with comic strip Daabu. Apart from 'this, Indian comics scenario was largely based on reprints of The Phantom and Superman. In 1969, Pran sketched Chacha Chaudhary for the Hindi magazine Lotpot, which made him famous. Pran has also created other cartoon characters like Shrimatiji, Pinki, Billoo, Raman, Channi Chachi and others, which are regularly published in Indian magazines. Pran reached lakhs of Kannadigas through his Putti, Raman that were published in Kannada daily Prajavani and Shrimathi which publishes in Kannada magazine Sudha. He was included in People of the Year 1995 by Limca Book of Records for popularizing comics in India. In 1983, the then Prime Minister of India, Mrs. Indira Gandhi released Pran's comics "Raman – Ham Ek Hain" which promoted national integration. Pran received a Lifetime Achievement Award 2001, from Indian Institute of Cartoonists. Pran has also given lessons in cartooning at the Pran's Media Institute, run by his son Nikhil.

Maurice Horn notes that Pran has been given the title of "Walt Disney of India" in The World Encyclopedia of Comics. The Chacha Chaudhary strips find permanent place in International Museum of Cartoon Art, United States.

== Death ==
He had been suffering from colon cancer and subsequently was admitted to a hospital in Gurgaon, where he died on 5 August 2014 at approximately 9:30 pm local time. He was posthumously awarded the Padma Shri, the fourth highest civilian award of India, in 2015.
