= Billoo =

- Illustration by Pran Kumar Sharma

Publication information
- Publisher: Diamond Comics
- Created by: Pran Kumar Sharma

Billoo (Hindi: बिल्लू) is an Indian comic character created by Pran Kumar Sharma and first appeared in print in 1973 in his self-titled series, published by Diamond Comics. The stories are set in and around Delhi circa seventies and eighties.

== Character and appearance ==
Billoo is describable as a fun-loving and charismatic teenager with a passion for cricket and TV. He is a prankster whose pranks tend to backfire on him, but manages to resolve them all at the end of the day with his wit. Billoo's eyes always remain obscured by his hair, with the exception of the issue Billoo's Valentine's Day, story "Ek din" (literal translation: "One day").

Early stories showed Billoo as a child rather than a teenager.

== Supporting cast ==
- Moti. Billoo's pet dog.
- Jozi. A neighborhood girl who is a childhood friend and eventual love interest to Billoo.
- Mona. Billoo's mother.
- Gabdu. One of Billoo's friends.
- Monu. One of Billoo's friends.
- Bishamber. One of Billoo's friends.
- Bajrangi. A local wrestler, who has a rivalry with Billoo.
- Dhakkan. Bajrangi's sidekick.
- Nattu. Bajrangi's son who considers Billoo as his enemy.
- Colonel Three Nought Three. Jozi's father, who has an immense dislike for Billoo, threatening to shoot him whenever they encounter each other.
