= ActionAid =

International non-governmental organization

- Formation: 1972; 54 years ago
- Founder: Cecil Jackson-Cole
- Type: International NGO
- Legal status: Nonprofit organization
- Purpose: ActionAid works with communities to reduce poverty and promote human rights
- Headquarters: Johannesburg, South Africa
- Region served: Africa, Asia, Europe, Australia, the Middle East, Americas
- Members: Child sponsors
- Secretary General: Arthur Larok
- Website: www.actionaid.org

ActionAid is an international non-governmental organization whose stated primary aim is to work against poverty and injustice worldwide. It is a federation of 45 country offices that works with communities, often via local partner organisations, on a range of development issues.

It was founded in 1972 by Cecil Jackson-Cole as a Christian child sponsorship charity (originally called Action in Distress) when 88 UK supporters sponsored 88 children in India and Kenya. Its primary focus is providing children with an education, furthering human rights for all, assisting people who are in poverty, and assisting people who face discrimination and injustice. ActionAid works with over 15 million people in 45 countries to assist those people.

Today its head office is located in South Africa with hubs in Asia, the Americas and Europe. ActionAid was the first big INGO to move its headquarters from the global north to the global south. ActionAid's current strategy aims to "build international momentum for social, economic and environmental justice, driven by people living in poverty and exclusion". This includes running campaigns and providing training and resources for social movements.

== Tax and economic justice ==
ActionAid has been campaigning for tax justice since 2008, conducting research into the effects of various international tax treaties and supporting local people and organizations to hold their governments to account. It argues that losing tax revenue to avoidance harms the world's poorest and most marginalized people, who depend on tax-funded public services. It is also often the case that the tax revenue lost in these treaties can exceed the amount of international aid money send to developing countries.

In 2011, ActionAid revealed that 98% of the UK's FTSE 100 companies use tax havens. In 2013 its research into corporate tax avoidance in Zambia showed that Associated British Foods were avoiding paying millions of dollars in corporate tax.

== Women's rights ==
ActionAid integrates women's rights into all of its programming and project work, but also undertakes campaigns that focus specifically on these issues.

Notable examples have included raising awareness about unpaid care work and sexual harassment and violence (including acid attacks) in Bangladesh, offering free cancer tests to women in Nigeria who could not afford them, and tackling female genital mutilation in Sweden. ActionAid's Who pays? report concerning the impact of supermarket price wars on the income and lives of women in the developing world was listed for debate under an early day motion in the UK's House of Commons in 2007.

== Climate justice ==
ActionAid's advocacy work on climate change focuses on climate justice, guided by the experiences and needs of its country's programmes. Its most prominent engagement comes through the annual Conference of Parties, where it supports communities vulnerable to climate change to influence decision-making processes.

It calls for rich countries to live up to pledges of providing climate adaptation grants and pushes for agreements to improve the lives of those most vulnerable to the impacts of climate change. ActionAid was also critical of climate insurance policies, such as those purchased by Malawi in 2015, since those insurance policies fail to deliver when they are desperately needed.

== Emergencies and humanitarian aid ==
ActionAid promotes women's leadership in humanitarian responses, arguing that women are best positioned to identify their needs and those of the communities around them in times of crisis. Strengthening citizens' rights is also a focus, such as campaigning with Haitians for greater transparency and accountability in how aid money was spent after the 2010 Haiti earthquake.

As it has established relationships with communities and other NGOs in countries that are prone to ecological events, ActionAid is often able to respond quickly to emergencies. Notable crises and responses have included the Boxing Day tsunami in 2004 in the Indian Ocean, drought in East Africa and India, and floods in Ghana, Rwanda, Sierra Leone, Bangladesh and Nepal.

On 4 October 2018 ActionAid announced that Pakistan government had ordered 18 international aid groups (including itself) to leave the country.

== Child sponsorship ==
Child sponsorship used to be one of ActionAid's primary sources of income. Donors sponsored an individual child from a community in a developing country and received regular updates about the child's progress and development.

Sponsorship funded support for the child's whole community, "so children have a healthy and safe place to live and grow up." This support took the form of providing clean water, healthcare, agricultural programmes, education centres in areas where schools are not available, and community income generation schemes.

In 2018, ActionAid USA stopped using the child sponsorship method of fundraising, and switched to a monthly giving program.

== Alliance-building ==
As ActionAid has grown in influence, building alliances with like-minded organisations has become a key focus area. Announcing this approach at the World Social Forum in 2015, ActionAid has played a role in convening civil society and community groups to tackle issues of youth political participation in the Middle East and global inequality.

== Supporting social causes through the mass media ==
ActionAid made India's first Bollywood film focusing on AIDS, Ek Alag Mausam, a love story involving HIV positive people, based on a script by playwright Mahesh Dattani.

ActionAid also supported Shyam Benegal's film, Samar, which is based on the book Unheard Voices: Stories of Forgotten Lives by Harsh Mander. The film raises issues about Dalits.

== Notable leaders ==
Everjoice Win was active in feminist and social justice movements in her country, Zimbabwe, the African continent, and globally for over 30 years. She was ActionAid International’s Global Head of Women’s Rights from 2002-2011, and the International Programmes Director between 2014-2020. She provided strategic leadership, guidance, and support across ActionAid’s federation, shaping its women’s rights, programs, advocacy, and campaigns work.

Javeria Malik is the first Pakistani woman to lead the Global Safety and Security Unit at ActionAid International and was featured on the website of International Women's Day 2022. INSSA Insights has featured Javeria as the first female Chairperson of the International NGO Safety & Security Association. Her interview published by the city security magazine was nominated for the best article of the year award. She was interviewed by Global Interagency Security Forum to speak on the topic of inclusivity and anti racism in the nonprofit and aid sector.

Marco De Ponte is currently the Chief Executive of Hivos and has been a member of the Global Leadership Team and also at the helm of ActionAid Italia between 2001 and 2025. He has led ActionAid's expansion into new countries and is a well known civil society leader in Italy and internationally. He has previously engaged extensively, in particular as a human rights activist with Amnesty International and in the field of humanitarian assistance. He is on the coordination committee of the Italian Inequality Forum Forum Diseguaglianze e Diversità and has published extensively on issue of social justice and public policy.
