= Chachi Mug =

Mountain in India

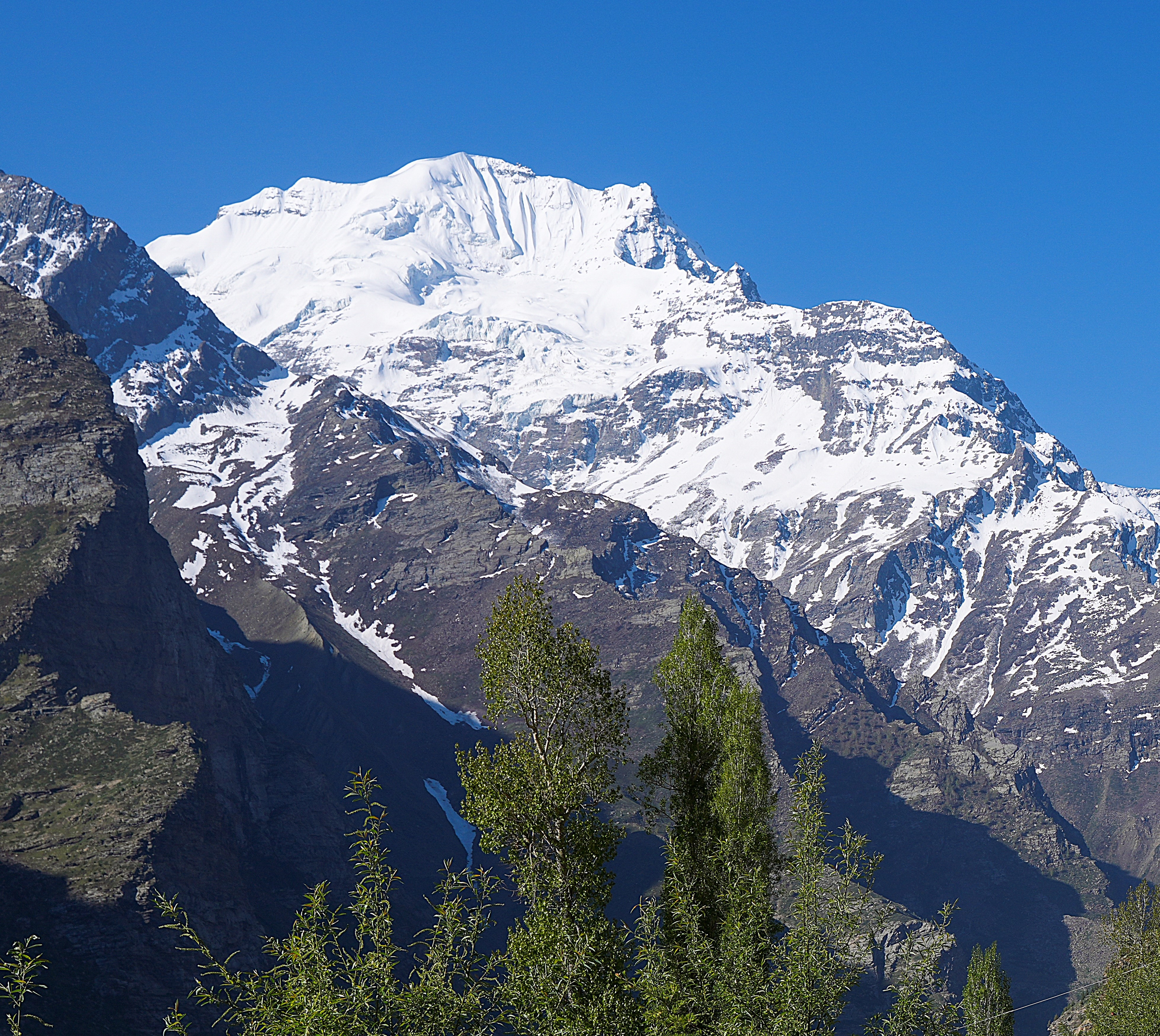
- North aspect

Highest point
- Elevation: 5,768 m (18,924 ft)
- Prominence: 805 m (2,641 ft)
- Parent peak: Goplang Goh
- Isolation: 5.47 km (3.40 mi)
- Coordinates: 32°32′01″N 77°08′03″E

Geography
- Location within India
- Interactive map of Chachi Mug
- Country: India
- State: Himachal Pradesh
- District: Lahaul and Spiti
- Parent range: Himalayas

Chachi Mug is a mountain in India.

== Description ==
Chachi Mug is a 5,768-metre (18,924-foot) summit in the Himalayas. The mountain is situated in the state of Himachal Pradesh, 150 kilometres (93 mi) north of the capital city of Shimla. Precipitation runoff from this mountain's south slope drains into the Chandra River and the north slope drains into the Bhaga River, and these two rivers converge 12 kilometres (7.5 mi) west of the peak to form the Chenab River. Topographic relief is significant as the summit rises 2,770 metres (9,088 ft) above the Chandra valley in six kilometres (3.7 mi) and 2,620 metres (8,596 ft) above the Bhaga valley in five kilometres (3.1 mi). The summit elevation is also reported as 5,765 metres, and 5,730 metres.

== Climate ==
Based on the Köppen climate classification, Chachi Mug is located in a tundra climate zone with cold, snowy winters, and cool summers. Weather systems are forced upwards by the Himalaya mountains (orographic lift), causing heavy precipitation in the form of rainfall and snowfall. July through September is the monsoon season. The months of April, May and June offer the most favorable weather for viewing or climbing this mountain.

== Gallery ==
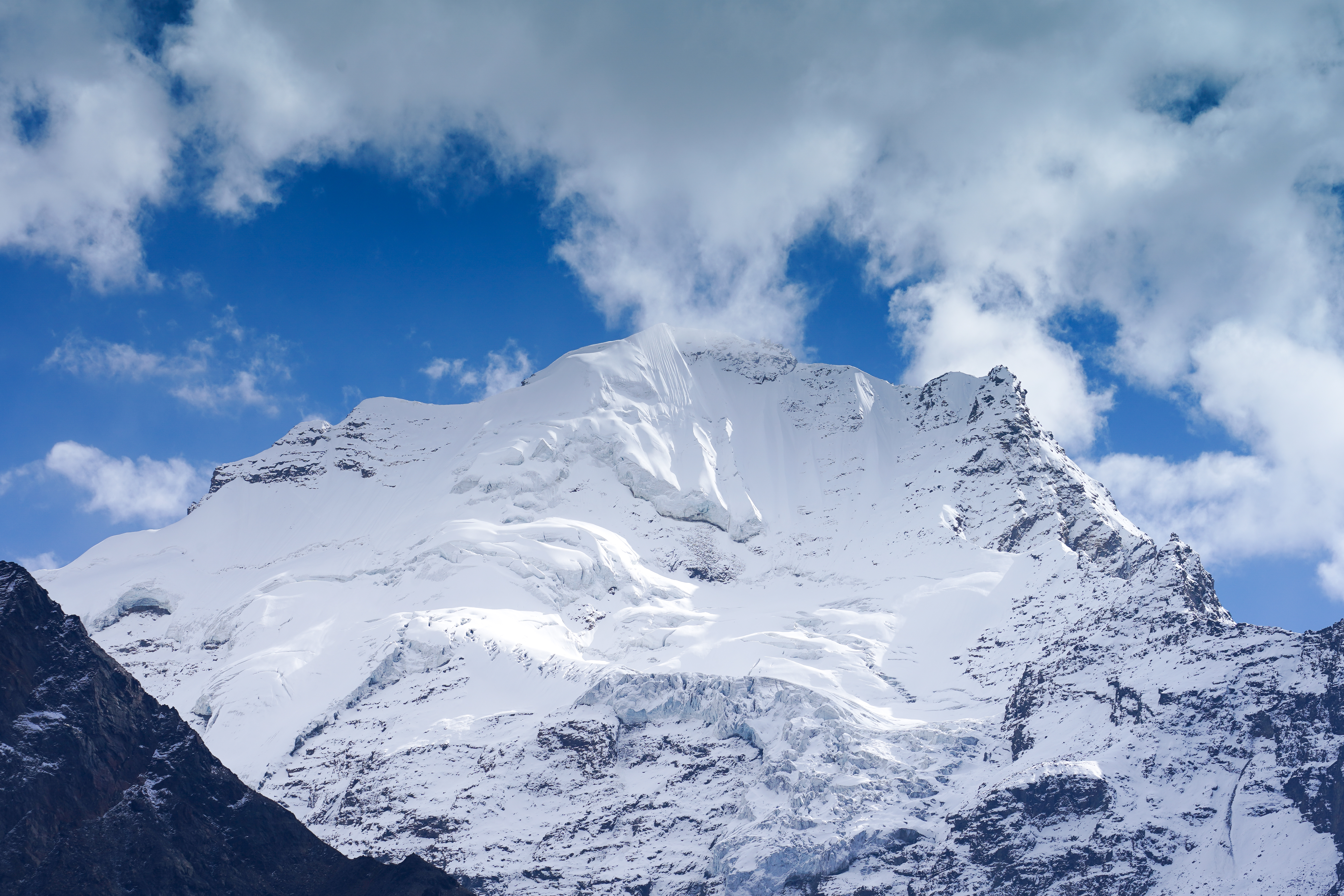
North face

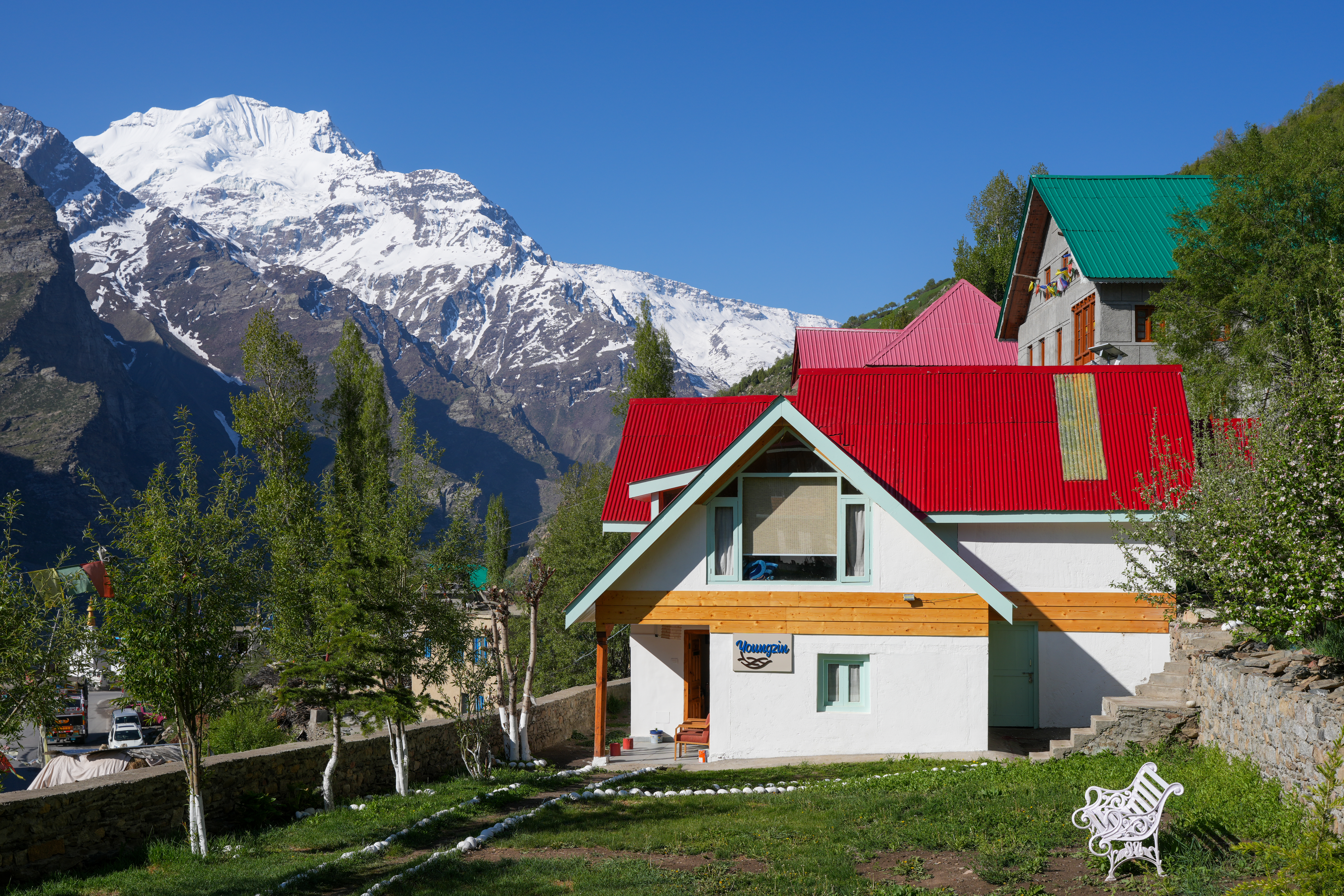
from Gemur

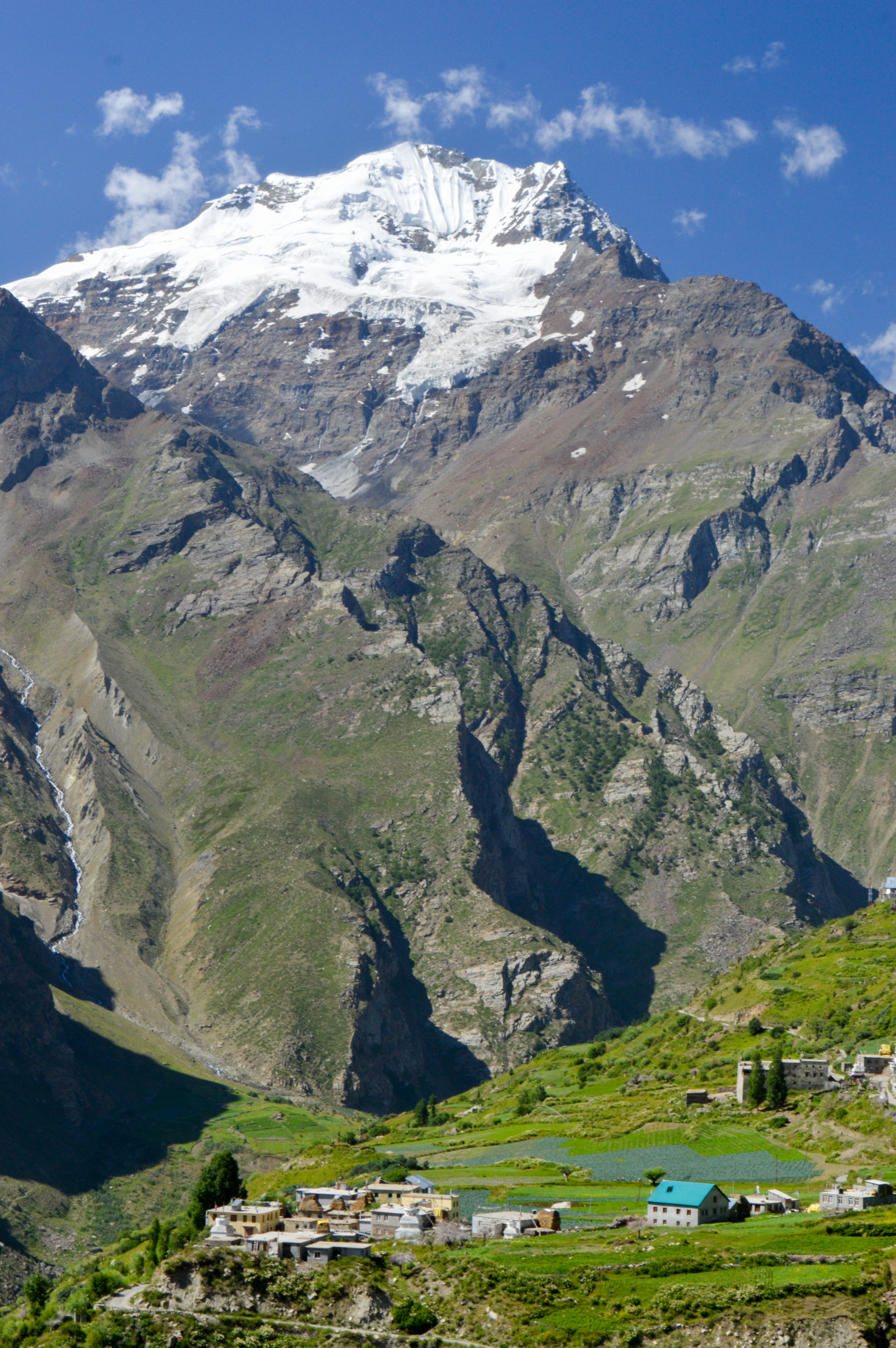

== See also ==
- Geology of the Himalayas
