= Shrimatiji =

Shrimatiji is an Indian comic based on a middle class housewife Sheela, popularly known as Shrimatiji. The series started in magazine Sarita. It was created by Pran Kumar Sharma. Her first appearance was in 1968. She has a husband and two kids.
