= Hanke Adventist High School =

Information
- School type: High school
- Capacity: c.600

Hanke Adventist High School is a high school in Shurugwi, Zimbabwe. It is a part of Hank Adventist Mission, including Hanke Adventist Primary School (HAPS). The school has been in existence for over a hundred years. The buildings are now very old, with the recent construction being the secondary school dining hall. The school accommodates both boarders and day scholars. The maximum number of students accommodated can reach approximately 600 pupils.
