= Tongogara High School =

High school in Zimbabwe

Coordinates: 19.7227°S 30.1997°E

Tongogara High School is a government-run high school in the rural areas of Chief Nhema in Shurugwi, Zimbabwe which offers classes up to A-level. It is in Mvura village.

As one of many post-independence secondary schools to be built in Zimbabwe, it was named after a freedom fighter, Josiah Tongogara, in honour of his exploits in the Rhodesian Bush War. The school is in his homeland. It is 15 km from Chachacha business centre, 18 km from the Chinogwenya village and the District Heroes Acre. The first A-level enrollment was in 1989. Boarding facilities were extended to the lower grades from 1990. There is also a continuing education program for those who would like to advance their education.

The first students to attend the school were 120, coming from Matamba Primary, Mavedzenge Primary and Tumba in 1982. The First Headmaster was Mr. W Chikumba. He was succeeded by Mr. C Magoma, Mr Makamure, Mr. Chikondo and Mrs. Musvavairi. The first O Levels were in November 1985, and the first intake for A Level was in 1986. Tongogara was once headed by Amai Mangoma the headmistress.

On the 23rd of October 2019, there was a fire incident which reduced the boys hostel to ashes. The origins of the fire were unclear, it is believed that someone left his candle burning as there was no electricity due to load shedding. On the 24th of October 2019, Unki mine offered accommodation to all the boys in the boarding and also to transport them to school every morning until the hostel is completely restored.
