= Chacha Chaudhary =

Indian comic book series

- Chacha Chaudhary with his dog Rocket or Rokket

Publication information
- Publisher: Diamond Comics
- Publication date: 1971
- Main characters: Chacha Chaudhary; Sabu; Rocket

Creative team
- Written by: Pran Kumar Sharma
- Artist: Pran Kumar Sharma

Chacha Chaudhary is an Indian comic book series, created by cartoonist Pran Kumar Sharma. The comic comes in ten Indian languages including Hindi and English and has sold over ten million copies. It has also been made into a 2002 live action television series, with Raghubir Yadav playing the role of Chacha Chaudhary, and a 2019 animated television series by Toonz Animation.

== History ==
Chacha Chaudhary was created in 1971 for the Hindi magazine Lotpot. It soon became popular among kids and the elderly alike. Pran was inspired from the ancient philosopher Chanakya and elder people of every village who help and solve problems by their elderly experience.

According to a Pran's Features press release, Indian children aged 10–13 years ranked Chacha Chaudhary as their most recognizable comic book character.

Chacha Chaudhary has also been featured as a guest in other Pran's Features series, with Billoo, Pinki.

== Synopsis ==
Chacha Chaudhary is a middle class Indian, an extremely intelligent old man. The word chacha means uncle in Hindi, while Chaudhary is a term used for landlords. A common saying about him is that "Chacha Chaudhary ka dimagh computer se bhi tez chalta hai" (Chacha Chaudhary's brain works faster than a computer), which is a testament to his unparalleled wisdom and wits.

Chacha Chaudhary's attire includes his red turban, a wooden stick, a waistcoat with a double inside pocket, and a pocket watch. His household consists of his wife Bini Chachi, a faithful street dog called Rocket and a giant alien from Jupiter named Sabu. He has an identical twin brother Chhajju Chaudhary, who visits him very rarely but whenever he arrives creates a funny situation. Sometimes, a tiny man called 'Tingu Master' is also shown to live with them. Chacha Chaudhary enjoys eating watermelon with relish but mangoes are his weakness, and often takes off for a walk with Sabu and Rocket, whenever Chaachi nags him. When he takes off his turban, it is shown that he is completely bald.

Everybody in town knows that whenever Chacha Chaudhary goes out with his family, he never locks the door of his house; but nobody has been successful in robbing his house. However, in certain stories, Chaachi (his wife) has been seen locking the house.

Sometimes his head or nose itches when any trouble is going to happen.

== Analysis ==
When asked about the inspiration for the series, Pran said, "Each family has its own wise old man. He solved his problems with common sense, but with a touch of humor. Humor is the basis of my cartoon." According to Pran, it was his pleasure to bring relief to the common man suppressed by various work loads of that era. Pran's hometown was Lahore, and came to India during partition of Indo-Pakistan.

Chacha Chaudhary is remarkably different from most other comic-book superheroes in that he is not a muscleman, nor does he have any extraordinary powers or modern gadgets. Instead, he uses "a brain sharper than a needle and faster than a super-computer" (Chacha Chaudhary ka dimaag computer se bhi tez chalta hai), and a wooden stick, to fight evil-doers. Many times, he takes help of a faithful alien from Jupiter, Sabu, who is like a son to him.

Chacha Chaudhary's characterization, like that of Pran's other characters, is around middle class typical Indian metro surroundings of the 1970s and 1980s, and it has kept evolving. The usual villains are corrupt government officials, thieves, roadside goons & bullies, tricksters, cons and local thugs. He not only fights them and helps the common man but also teaches them moral lessons and good behavior. Most of the events end up with goons embarrassed by their deeds. One can see the middle class dealing with everyday problems. In a way Pran takes a whip at those problems but still maintains a happy-go-lucky feel with twinkling eyes and smiling faces.

== Characters ==
=== Sabu ===
Sabu is an alien from the planet Jupiter, always faithful to Chacha and provides the physical strength in time of need. He is huge and incredibly strong, standing at about 15 feet tall. Though his size has been highly inconsistent throughout the comic series. In some comics he is able to increase his size. In certain other stories he also comes out only when Chacha Chaudhary rubs a lamp (much like Aladdin). He wears only a wrestler's kachha (briefs), a pair of ear-rings and a pair of gum-boots. But in some comics, Sabu was shown wearing slim fit green trousers.

Sabu decided to stay on Earth with Chacha when he tasted delicious paratha and halwa made by Chachi during his visit to earth. Both Chacha and Chachi treat Sabu like their own son and in certain stories Chachi is shown to have more affection for Sabu than even Chacha Chaudhary. Sabu has a twin brother called Dabu and the giant earrings that Sabu wears were gifted to him by his mother when he left Jupiter. According to the comics, whenever Sabu gets angry, a volcano erupts at some distant place (this is stated in a panel with a picture of a volcano erupting, which says, "When Sabu is Angry, a Volcano Erupts at some distant place in Jupiter"). Whenever he performs an act of great strength, he utters the cry, "Hu-Huba!". Sometimes he has been found to utter "Jai Bajrang Bali" which roughly translates to "Hail Hanuman" (a popular Hindu God). It is revealed in some comics that and Sabu eats 202 chapatis, 14 kilos of halwa, 22 kilos of rice / pulao, 7 kilos of vegetable preparations, 10 kilos curry, and about 18 litres of lassi (the favourite part of his meal) in one meal. He often finishes the meal with a basketful of fruit. He is often served lassi, tea, juice or some other non-alcoholic drink in a large bucket or pot. He is not married, and avoids the topic.

Unlike Chacha, Sabu does not have much wisdom, intelligence or wits and mainly relies on his physical strength. However, he has quick reflexes and has often saved the life of Chacha with his immense power and lightning-fast reflexes, often acting at the last moment when any goon tries to kill Chacha. In certain stories, Sabu is also shown to be wise, but not like Chacha Chaudhary (like the one where he finds out about an escaped prisoner or the one where he throws his huge umbrella to save people from drowning).

Sabu's biggest enemy is Raaka, who is of the same size as that of Sabu, and is immortal, thanks to a special Ayurvedic medicine he accidentally consumed. Raaka and Sabu are both strong but Sabu always wins in their fights. Since Sabu can't kill Raaka, he always leaves him at a place where he cannot bother humanity. However, somehow Raaka manages to escape and wreak havoc upon return. This has resulted in a series of comics on Raaka, which have been very popular and well received.

=== Bini Chachi ===
Chacha Chaudhary's wife Bini is a dominating lady who is the boss of the house and occasionally battles the thieves with her belan (rolling pin). She is usually dressed in polka dotted sari and has a hair style matching 1970s style of Indian actresses. Although very kind hearted with all the attributes of a strict but caring wife, she often nags Chacha of not buying her gold bangles, not taking her out, and the fact that she has to cook a lot for Sabu although she serves as a motherly figure for Sabu. In one comic she is shown stirring a giant pot with a ladle for Sabu and serving him more affectionately than Chacha.

In one of the comics, Bini's history was revealed. She was actually an actress who decided to marry Chacha Chaudhary after he saved her life from goons who were threatening her to give them all her jewellery or they would kill her.

=== Chhajju Chaudhary ===
A secret that many of the characters in the comics do not know is that Chacha Chaudhary has a twin brother named Chhajju Chaudhary, who is mentally not as gifted as Chacha Chaudhary. In many stories he proves to be the secret weapon to dodge the corrupts and goons. He was once taken to Mars by aliens mistaking him as Chacha Chaudhary.

=== Rocket (Raket) ===
Rocket is Chacha Chaudhary's pet dog. He was found as a stray dog and was adopted by Chacha, much to the dismay of his wife, who said that raising Sabu in itself was a handful for her. Though she later accepted the dog when it attacked the burglars in the house. He is rather well known as Raket. The only characteristic of this dog is defined in the line "Chacha Chaudhary ka kutta ssurrlup ssurrlup doodh peeta hai" (Chacha Chaudhary's dog drinks milk) and the fact that he is the only vegetarian dog in the whole world. The dog has proven himself at occasions, attacking his foes on command.

=== Tingu Master ===
Tingu Master is a tiny man (probably a midget) who is often seen in the comics along with Chacha Chaudhary and Sabu. He usually is shown to be a very unlucky person, falling into problems and danger which are either aimed at Chacha Chaudhary or are purely situational. However, at certain points he has come to the forefront to actually save Chacha Chaudhary from a potential death or defeat. Like Sabu, he is shown to be loyal, albeit, he is not as significant a character as the former. Many times, the comic situations in the stories have revolved around Tingu Master being very tiny, which makes others fail to notice him and accidentally perform actions like dumping him away with garbage.

=== Dag Dag ===
Dag Dag is actually Chacha Chaudhary's truck which he drives. However, with a twist, It is revealed that Dag Dag is actually half machine and half human. On several occasions when thieves try to steal Dag Dag, it refuses to start. Also, if Chacha Chaudhary is in trouble, as soon as he whistles, Dag Dag comes at full speed and collides with the one who is troubling him.

=== Gobar Singh and Dhamaka Singh ===
Main enemies of Chacha Chaudhary are Gobar Singh and Dhamaka Singh. They are robbers who are always punished by Chacha Chaudhary. Sometimes they try to harm Chacha Chaudhary but end up harming themselves. Dhamaka Singh often brings his other stooges to attack Chacha and Sabu but his plans always backfire. Two of Dhamaka Singh's recurring accomplices are Paleeta and Ruldu.

=== Raaka ===
A significant enemy of both Chacha and Sabu is Raaka and the main antagonist of the Chacha Chaudhary series. Raaka was once a dacoit who was chased by cops. Trying to evade the cops, he hid in a building and a gunfight ensued. When out of ammunition, he tried to commit suicide by drinking poison he found in the house he was hiding in. Unknown to him, the house belonged to a great knowledgeable sage called Chakramacharya, who had developed a potion of immortality. Fearing it would be misused, he had labeled the potion as "Poison". Raaka mistakenly eats the immortality potion believing it to be poison and kills Chakramacharya who tries to stop him from doing so. Once he notices he has become immortal, his mischief increases and he no longer remains a mere dacoit. There's a comic series on Raaka and his fights with Sabu which Sabu manages to win with the wisdom of Chacha helping him. Since Sabu cannot kill Raaka, Chacha always advises him to dump Raaka somewhere where he cannot harm humans. The places comprise space, deep inside the ocean, frozen on the North pole, etc. However, Raaka somehow manages to escape and that's what subsequent comics narrate. Chacha Chaudhary and Sabu have once forced Raaka to shave off his mustache as a result of some competition which was won by Chacha. Chacha's comic with Raaka, Raaka ki Waapsi (The Return of Raaka) is one of the best selling comics of Pran's Features. Raaka was put to sleep by some potion given by a saint from the Himalayas (who happened to be the Guru of Chakramacharya) and buried in the ocean on the first encounter. On his return by another potion he was reduced to a small size, closed in a bottle and buried in a grave. But this was not the end. He returned several times again to wreak havoc in the city. Finally Chacha Chaudhary and Sabu buried him in an endless hole somewhere near a rocket launch site. But for the last time (Comic- Raaka ki Akhiri Jung) he was thrown in a whirlpool in an ocean. He returned from whirlpool in Raaka's anger and is thrown into space In the latest comic (Raaka's terror) Raaka returns back this time from space,. He was defeated again by chacha chaudhary and sabu and thrown in an acid tank where his body get dissolved in acid and he is converted into liquid state. This liquid state has been stored securely to prevent any escape route for Raaka.

== Adaptations ==
=== Live action television series ===
Chacha Chaudhary
- Based on: Chacha Chaudhary by: Pran Kumar Sharma
- Written by: M. Salim
- Directed by: Jayant Gilatar; Mohit Jha
- Country of origin: India
- Original language: Hindi
- No. of seasons: 2
- No. of episodes: 415

Production
- Producers: Ketan Mehta; Ashwin Verma
- Camera setup: Multi-camera
- Running time: ~ 24 minutes
- Production companies: Maya Entertainment; Televista

Original release
- Network: Sahara One
- Release: 13 May 2002

Related
- Chacha Chaudhary (2019 TV series)

A television series Chacha Chaudhary was launched on 13 May 2002 on Sahara One. The series stars known Indian television actor Raghubir Yadav as Chacha Chaudhary.

=== Animated television series ===
Chacha Chaudhary
- Based on: Chacha Chaudhary by Pran Kumar Sharma
- Written by: Sandiip Paatil; Aarsh Vora
- Music by: Abhijeet Hegdepatil
- Country of origin: India
- Original languages: Hindi; Tamil; Telugu
- No. of seasons: 1

Production
- Production company: Toonz Animation

Original release
- Network: Disney Channel India; Hungama TV
- Release: 10 June 2019

An animated series produced by Toonz Animation (based in Trivandrum) premiered on Hungama TV and on Disney Channel India on 10 June 2019.

=== Films ===
In 2009, Pran's Features, the owner of characters Chacha Chaudhary, Sabu and Pinki tied up with License India, to bring them to silver screen as animation characters.
