= Monchito =

Raymond Muñoz Rodriguez, known as Monchito, is a Latin music bandleader and percussionist popular during the New York mambo and cha cha cha boom of the 1950s. Monchito played bongo for Tito Puente, but in 1959 moved to Tito Rodriguez' band to be able to play timbal.

== Discography ==
- Cha Cha Cha, album 1955 Monchito and the Mambo Royals
