= Pakame Mission =

Coordinates: 19°56′S 30°03′E

Information
- School type: Boarding school
- Religious affiliation(s): Methodism

Pakame Mission is a Methodist-run boarding school in Shurugwi, Zimbabwe which offers classes up to A-level. The mission consists of a primary school and a high school. The school was started by Esau Nemapare, an Ethiopianist clergyman. For a time, it was operated by Thompson Samkange.

== Sources ==
- Ranger, Terence (1 January 1993). "Thompson Samkange: Tambaram and Beyond". Journal of Religion in Africa. 23 (1–4): 318–346. doi:10.1163/157006693X00184. ISSN 1570-0666.
