= Guadagnini (surname) =

Guadagnini is an Italian surname. Notable people with the surname include:

- Antonio Guadagnini (born 1966), Italian politician
- Giovanni Battista Guadagnini (1711–1786), Italian luthier
- Mattia Guadagnini (born 2002), Italian motocross rider
- Paolo Guadagnini (1908–1942), Italian violin maker

== See also ==
- Guadagnino
