= Batu =

Batu may refer to:

== Geography ==
- Batu City, a city in East Java, Indonesia
- Batu Islands, an archipelago of Indonesia
- Batu, Iran, a village in Razavi Khorasan Province, Iran
- Batu, Kuala Lumpur, an area in Malaysia
- Batu (town), Ethiopia
- Batu Lintang camp, a World War II Japanese POW and civilian internee camp at Kuching, Sarawak
- Batu Tara, a small isolated island of Indonesia in the Flores Sea
- Mount Batu, Ethiopia
- Batu (federal constituency), represented in the Dewan Rakyat (Malaysian Parliament)

== People ==
- Batu (given name), Turkic given name
- Batu (surname), list of people with the surname
- Batu Khan (c. 1205 – 1255), a Mongol ruler and founder of the Golden Horde
- Batu (group), a Brazilian-influenced music group from London
- Batu or Batupuei people in Matupi, Chin State, Myanmar (Burma)
- Saru Batu Savcı Bey (died 1287), elder brother of Osman I, the founder of the Ottoman Empire.

== Education ==
- BATU, abbreviation for Babasaheb Ambedkar Technological University, Lonere, Raigad, Maharashtra, India

== Trade unions ==
- Brotherhood of Asian Trade Unionists, former trade union federation
- Building and Allied Trades' Union, Irish trade union

== Other uses ==
- Batu, slang used in Hawaii to describe crystal methamphetamine
- Batu, ball game of Taíno origin, similar to volleyball.
- Batu, a fictional character in the book Skulduggery Pleasant: The Faceless Ones
- Batu language, a Tivoid language of Nigeria
- Battu, a fictional character in the Nickelodeon India animated TV series Gattu Battu
