= List of programmes broadcast by Nickelodeon (India) =

This is a list of television programmes broadcast by Nickelodeon in India. The channel was launched on 16 October 1999.

Nickelodeon India's current logo, used since 2024.

== Current programming ==
=== Nickelodeon SD & HD+ ===
- Bittu Bahanebaaz
- Chikoo Aur Bunty
- Gattu Battu
- Motu Patlu
- Daaduji

== Former programming ==
=== Live action/mixed ===
- 100 Deeds for Eddie McDowd
- Action League Now!
- Allegra's Window
- The Amanda Show
- Artzooka!
- The Brothers García
- Clarissa Explains It All
- Drake & Josh
- Dum Duma Dum
- Figure It Out
- Genie in the House
- Gilli Gilli Gappa
- Globo Loco
- J Bole Toh Jadoo
- Jai Shri Krishna
- The Journey of Allen Strange
- Junior G
- Kenan & Kel
- Khushi Ki Duniya
- LazyTown
- Legends of the Hidden Temple
- Mr. Meaty
- NG Knight Ramune & 40
- Nick Kathakali
- Nickelodeon Guts
- The Munnabhai Show
- Pick-a-Trick
- Power Rangers
  - Power Rangers Super Ninja Steel
  - Power Rangers Ninja Steel
  - Power Rangers Dino Super Charge
  - Power Rangers Dino Charge
  - Power Rangers Super Samurai
  - Power Rangers Samurai
  - Power Rangers Megaforce
  - Power Rangers Beast Morphers
- Sam & Cat
- Say Please!
- Spellz
- Tricky TV
- Unfabulous
- Uncle Max

=== Animated series ===
- Aaahh!!! Real Monsters
- Abhimanyu Ki Alien Family
- The Adventures of Jimmy Neutron, Boy Genius
- All Grown Up!
- The Angry Beavers
- As Told by Ginger
- Atashin'chi
- Avatar: The Last Airbender
- Back at the Barnyard
- Backkom
- Batfink
- Bigfoot Presents: Meteor and the Mighty Monster Trucks
- Blue's Clues
- CatDog
- Cédric
- ChalkZone
- Chibi Maruko-chan
- Chicken Stew
- The Daltons
- Danger Mouse
- Danny Phantom
- Dennis the Menace
- Dinosaur King
- Dora the Explorer
- Dougie in Disguise
- Dreamkix
- Engie Benjy
- The Fairly OddParents
- Fetch the Vet
- Go, Diego, Go!
- The Harveytoons Show
- Hey Arnold!
- Hubert & Takako
- Idaten Jump
- Invader Zim
- Jankenman
- Journey to the West: Legends of the Monkey King
- The Jungle Book
- Kaeloo
- Kanha – Morpankh Samrat (only aired for two days)
- Keymon Ache
- Kiri the Clown
- Little Bill
- Little Krishna
- Little Spirou
- The Loud House
- Max & Ruby
- Mighty Cat Masked Niyander
- Minuscule
- Ninja Hattori
- Ninjago: Masters of Spinjitzu
- Oggy and the Cockroaches
- Pakdam Pakdai
- The Penguins of Madagascar
- Perman
- Roary the Racing Car
- Rocket Monkeys
- Rocket Power
- Rocko's Modern Life
- Rudra
- Rugrats
- Shaktimaan: The Animated Series
- Shiva
- Skyland
- Speed Racer X
- SpongeBob SquarePants
- Tak and the Power of Juju
- Teenage Mutant Ninja Turtles
- Titeuf
- Tony & Alberto
- Trollz
- Tumoya Island
- Turbo Dogs
- The Twisted Timeline of Sammy & Raj
- The Wild Thornberrys
- Winx Club
- Yakkity Yak

== See also ==
- Nickelodeon (Pakistan)
- List of programs broadcast by Nickelodeon (Pakistan)
- Sonic
- List of Indian animated television series
- List of programmes broadcast by Cartoon Network (India)
- List of programmes broadcast by Disney Channel (India)
- List of programmes broadcast by Hungama TV
- List of programmes broadcast by Discovery Kids (India)
- Marvel HQ (India)
- Sony Yay
