= Millfield =

Public school in Street, Somerset, England

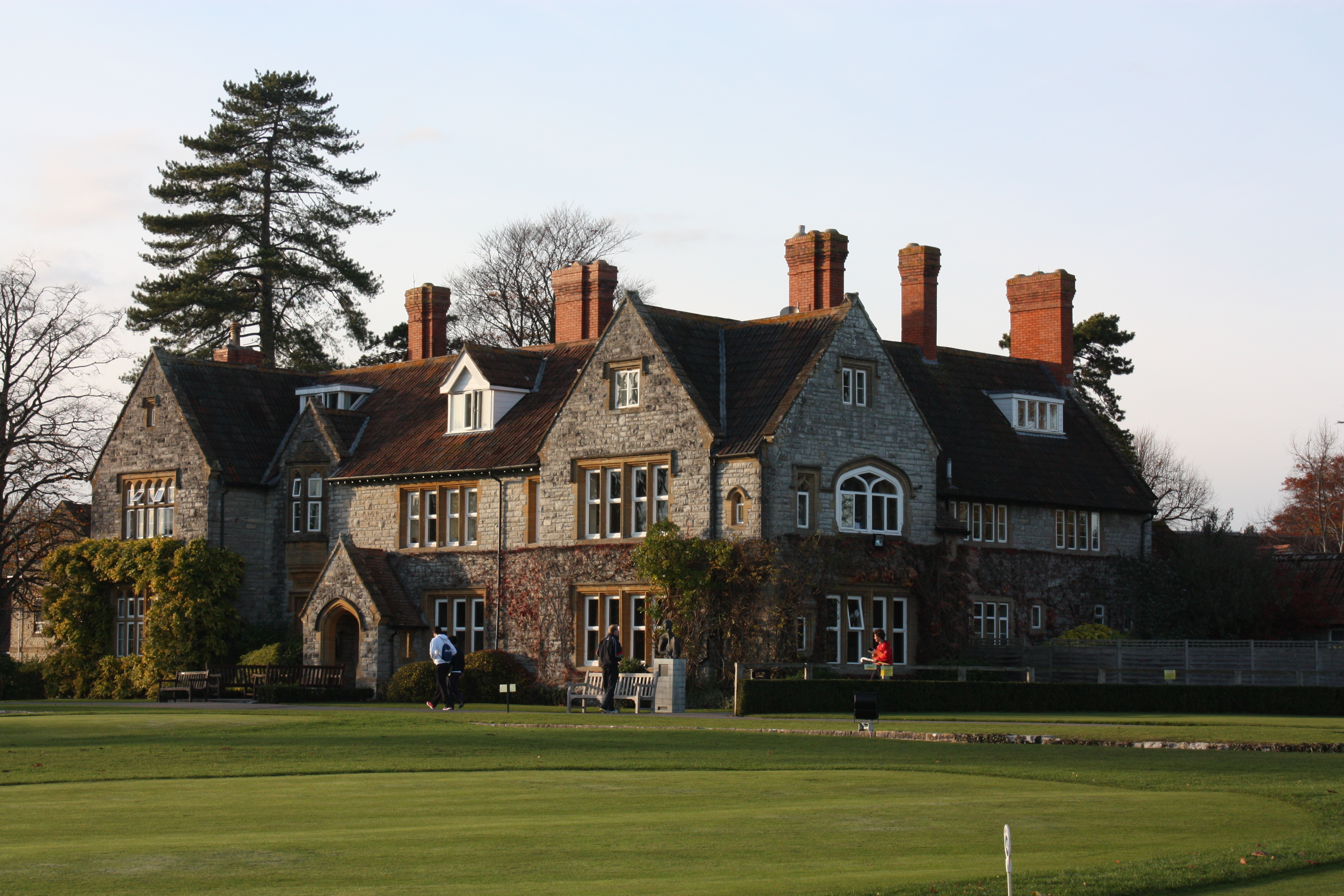

Location
- Butleigh Road; Street, Somerset, BA16 0YD; England; 51.1225°N 2.7275°W

Information
- Type: Private school; Boarding school; Day school; Public school
- Established: 1935
- Founder: Jack Meyer
- Department for Education URN: 123911 Tables
- Headmaster: Gavin Horgan
- Gender: Co-educational
- Age: 2 to 18
- Enrollment: 1,240
- Houses: 19 boarding, 5 day
- Colour
- Slogan: Molire Molendo
- Alumni: Old Millfieldians
- Website: www.millfieldschool.com

Millfield is a public school (fee paying school) with boarding and day school facilities for pupils aged 13–18 in Street, Somerset, England. It was founded in 1935.

Millfield is the largest co-educational boarding school in the UK with about 1,330 students, of whom over 990 are full boarders from 75 countries. Millfield Development and the Millfield Foundation raise money to fund scholarships and bursaries. The school is a member of the G30 Schools group and a member of the Headmasters' and Headmistresses' Conference. Its campus is based over 240 acres.

Millfield has its own pre-prep and preparatory school, Millfield Preparatory School (also known as Edgarley) in nearby Glastonbury, which takes children from 2 to 13 years old. The prep school shares some of Millfield's facilities.

== History ==
Millfield was founded in 1935 by Jack Meyer (referred to at Millfield as "Boss"), following his return from India with seven Indian boys, six of whom were princes. Among these Indian princes included Meghrajji III, the last ruling Maharaja of Dhrangadhra-Halvad. The school started in the mansion built and originally owned by the Clark family, who owned and ran the shoe manufacturer Clarks.

Meyer, educated at Haileybury and Imperial Service College, adhered to the philanthropic aim, known at the school as The Millfield Mix: "to nurture talent by providing the very best facilities, teaching, coaching and opportunities in which young people can exercise and explore their abilities; and to give awards to those in financial need."

In 1939, Millfield was one of the first independent schools to become co-educational. Over the years, the school acquired land and houses within 10 miles (16 kilometres) of its campus. These were largely turned into boarding houses for students. The girls' boarding house was at Ashcott House from 1967 until 1984. Many of these houses have been sold and the proceeds invested in new on-campus boarding houses. There are three remaining country boarding houses occupied by male pupils.

In the 1990s, the school gained a reputation for drug and alcohol use among the pupils and a teacher was charged with assaulting a female pupil. Any pupils found with any illegal substances are immediately expelled.

In 2005, the school was one of fifty independent schools found guilty of running an illegal price-fixing cartel, exposed by The Times, which allowed them to drive up fees for thousands of parents. Each school was required to pay a nominal penalty of £10,000 and all agreed to make ex gratia payments totalling £3 million into a trust designed to benefit pupils who attended the schools when the collusion took place.

In 2018, the school made national news when allegations of bullying arose after a student reported that Year 10 pupils were beaten with cricket bats and belts for an initiation ceremony.An investigation was conducted and two pupils were suspended. According to a Freedom of Information request the school left the Teacher's Pension Scheme on 31 August 2021.

== Houses ==
Millfield is predominantly a boarding school, having around 75% of its pupils as full boarders. The school operates a house system, which is based on sex and status as a day pupil or boarder. With the introduction of 'Nine at Millfield' in 2014, Year 9 is now treated as a transitional year with the school having 'Year 9 only' day and boarding houses. All of the other houses are Years 10–13 boarders, and two are exclusively for sixth formers (i.e., Years 12 and 13). The boarding houses are supervised by house parents, assisted by assistant house parents, tutors, and matrons. Each house generally has around 40 to 50 pupils.

There are fourteen boys' and nine girls' houses; the oldest house is Millfield House, which is the original building in which the school first began operating. The house opened when the school was established in 1935 and is now one of Year 9 boarding houses. The house, designed by the architect George Skipper, and built in 1888, used to be the mansion of the Clark family, whose shoe business, Clarks, is based in the town.

Girls

House	Year groups^{1}	Day/boarding
Abbey	Senior	Boarding
Acacia	Year 9	Boarding
Kernick	Senior	Boarding
The Lakes	Senior	Day
Martins	Senior	Boarding
Overleigh	Senior	Day
Portway	Senior	Boarding
Southfield	Senior	Boarding
The Grange	Sixth form	Boarding
Warner	Senior	Boarding

Boys

House	Year group^{1}	Day/boarding
Butleigh	Sixth form	Boarding
Etonhurst	Senior	Boarding
Great	Senior	Day
Holmcroft	Senior	Boarding
Joan's Kitchen	Senior	Boarding
Keen's Elm	Year 9	Boarding
Kingweston	Senior	Boarding
Mill	Senior	Day
Millfield	Year 9	Boarding
Orchards	Senior	Boarding
St Anne's	Senior	Boarding
Shapwick	Senior	Boarding
Walton	Senior	Boarding

== Sports ==
Millfield is known for its sporting prowess, and has produced many international and Olympic athletes; its campus houses a wide range of sports facilities. 130 staff sports coaches oversee the 29 different sports on offer, including athletics, badminton, basketball, chess, clay shooting, cricket, cross country, dance, equestrian, fencing, football, golf, hockey, karate, modern pentathlon, netball, outdoor activities, rowing, rugby, ski racing, squash, swimming, tennis, trampolining and triathlon.

=== Olympic Games ===
Millfield has been represented at every Olympic Games since 1956. At the London 2012 Games, Millfield was the most represented UK school. At the Rio Games in 2016, eight Millfieldians took part and won a total of four medals in rowing, swimming and rugby sevens.

Millfield has an indoor and outdoor riding arena and golf courses, as well as a 50 metre swimming pool. The Russian swimming team used the school as its training base before the London Olympics, and the Great Britain modern pentathlon squad also used the school's facilities in preparation for the games.

== Preparatory school ==
Millfield Preparatory School

Location
- Glastonbury, Somerset, BA6 8LD; England; 51.139°N 2.689°W

Information
- Type: Preparatory day and boarding
- Established: 1946
- Founder: Jack "Boss" Meyer
- Department for Education URN: 123921 Tables
- Head teacher: Dan Thornburn
- Gender: Coeducational
- Age: 2 to 13
- Website: millfieldschool.com/prep

Millfield Preparatory School is a coeducational preparatory school in Glastonbury and is the feeder for the senior school.

=== History ===
The school was founded in 1946 by Jack 'Boss' Meyer, who also founded and ran Millfield and later became the headteacher. He bought Edgarley Hall and its grounds from the Thomas-Ferrands, following use by the army in World War II.

Meyer's philosophy was "to nurture talent by providing the very best facilities, teaching, coaching and opportunities in which young people can exercise and explore their abilities; and to give awards to those in financial need."

A pre-preparatory department was initially started at the 19th-century house, The Hollies, in the centre of Glastonbury in the mid-1980s, later moving to the main preparatory school site.

=== Boarding ===
Around 43% of pupils are boarders. Boarding has been an integral part of the school for most of its history. There are three boys' boarding houses and two girls' houses, each housing between 30 and 40 pupils. Flexi-boarding is also available.

House	Gender
Berewall	Boys
Champion	Boys
Chestnut	Girls
Hollies	Girls

=== Sport ===
There are 24 sports on offer and over 70 co-curricular activities. Sports facilities include a 50m swimming pool, an equestrian centre, sports halls, cricket nets, putting green, squash courts, AstroTurf hockey pitch, outdoor tennis courts, netball courts and a 9-hole golf course.

=== Chapel ===
The school chapel was opened in 1897 as a mission church serving Edgarley.

=== Notable former masters ===
- Geoff Keating, founder member of The Master Singers
- John le Carré, author and secret service operative

== Headmasters ==
1. 1935–1971 Jack Meyer
2. 1971–1986 Colin Atkinson
3. 1986–1990 Brian Gaskell
4. 1990–1998 Christopher Martin
5. 1998–2008 Peter Johnson
6. 2008–2018 Craig Considine
7. 2018– Gavin Horgan

== Images ==
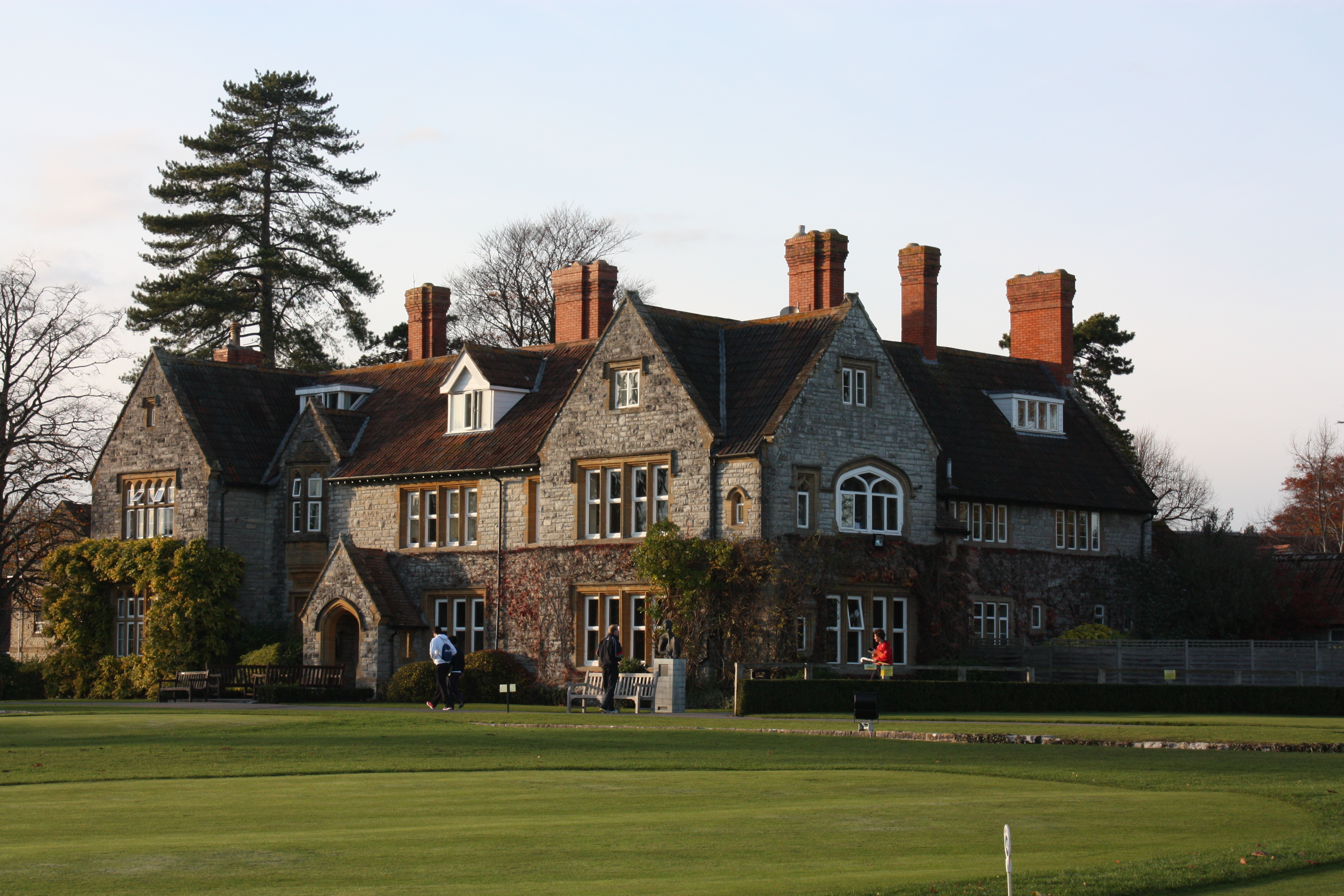
Millfield House

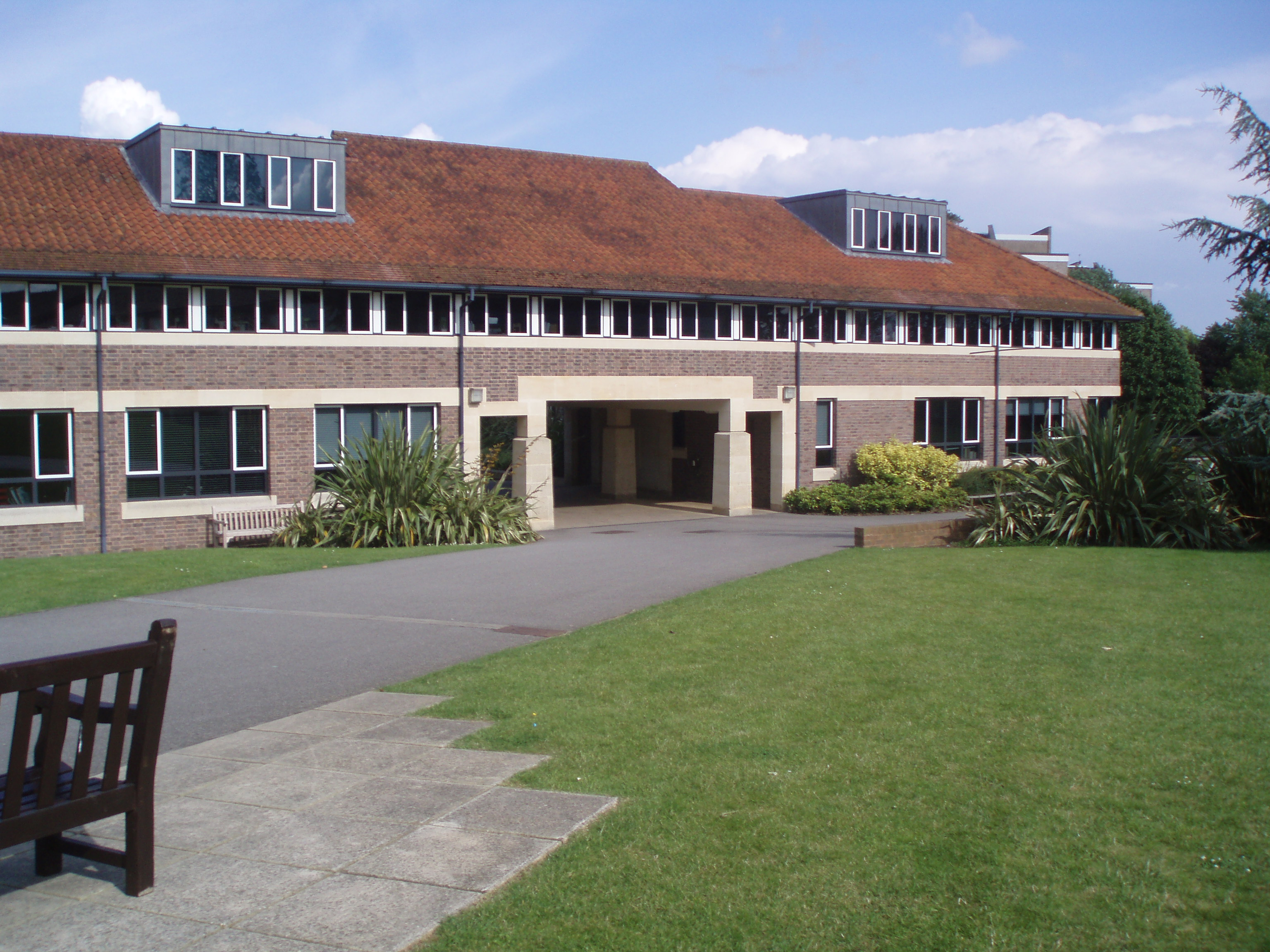
The new maths block

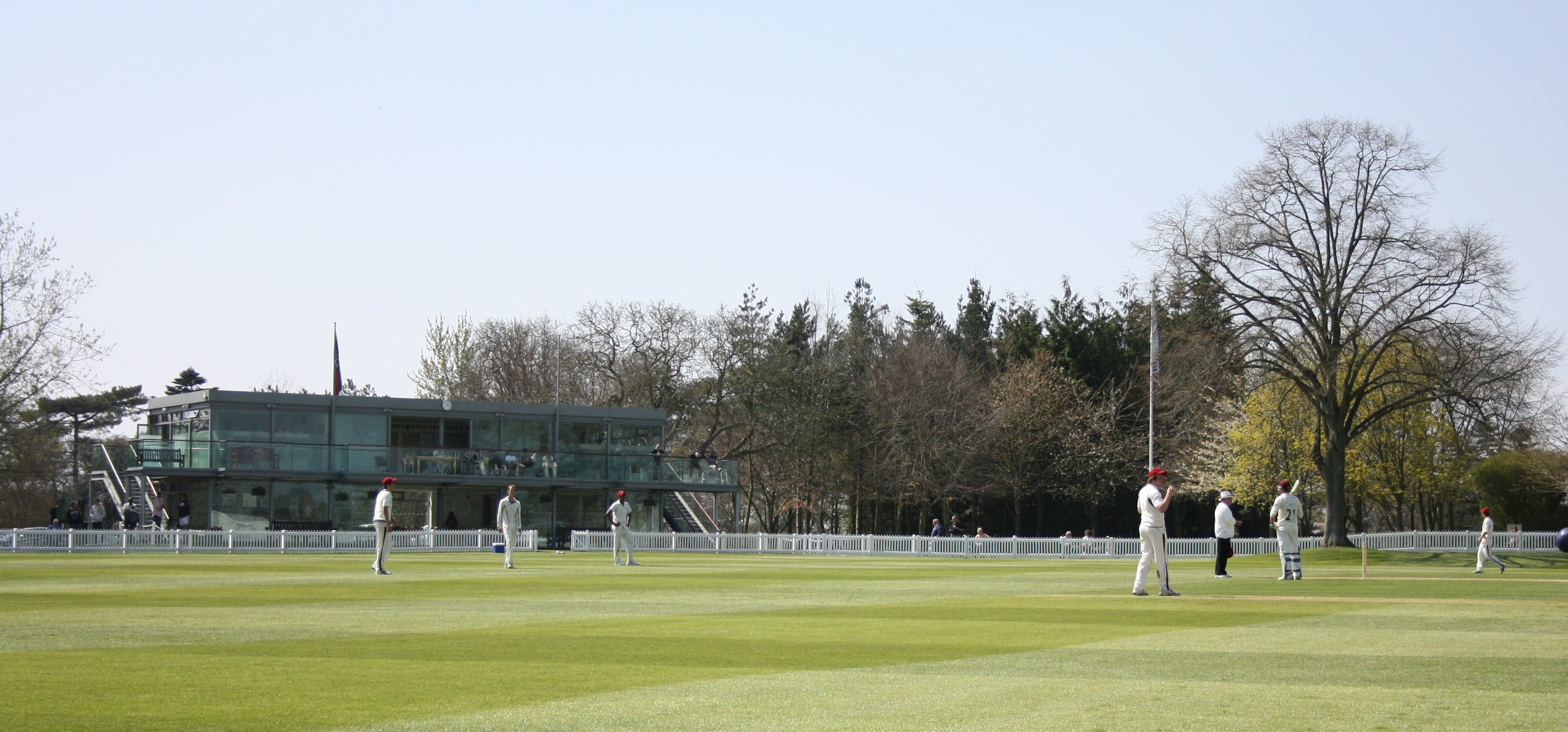
The school cricket ground and pavilion

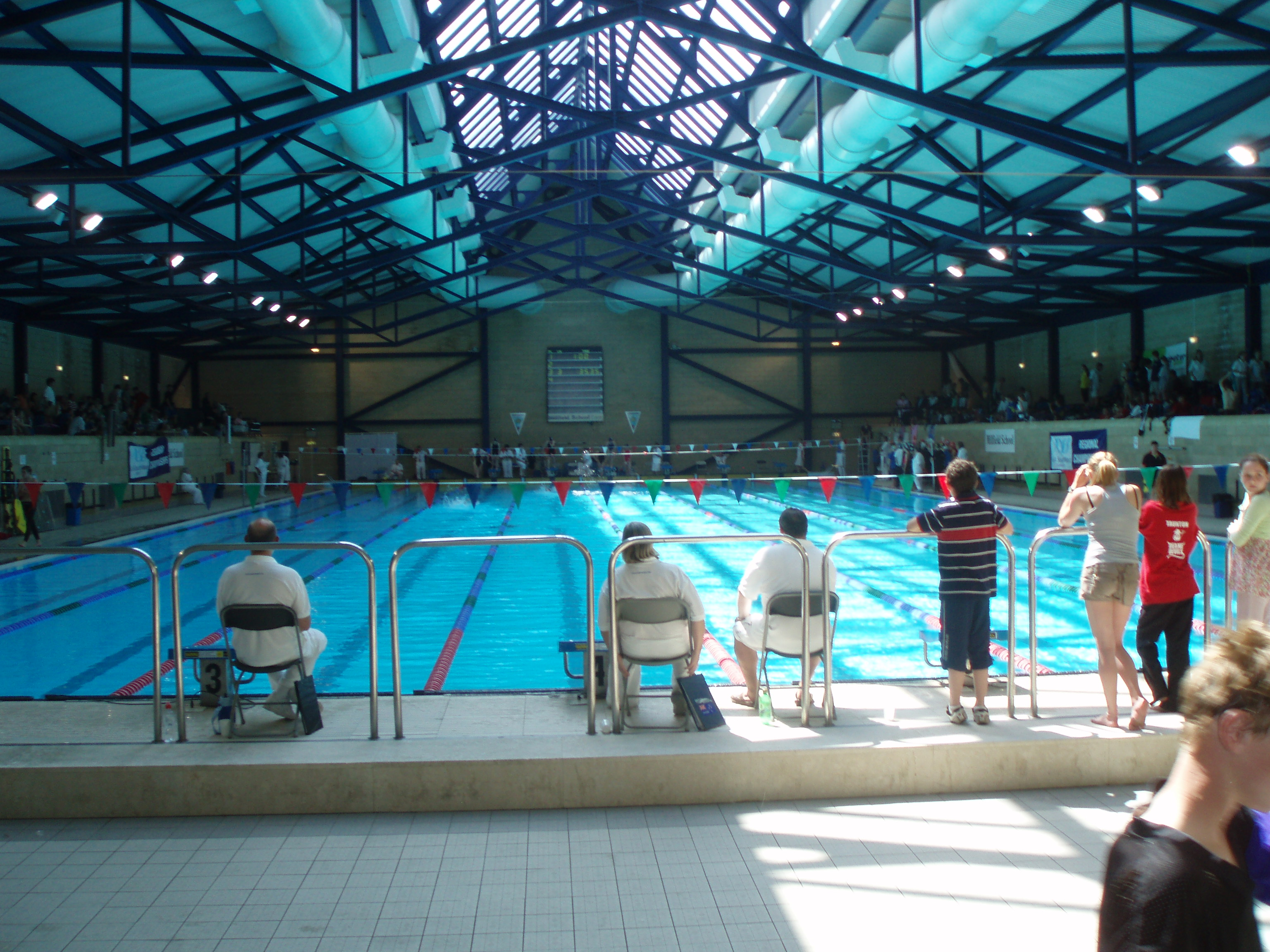
The 50m Olympic pool at Millfield

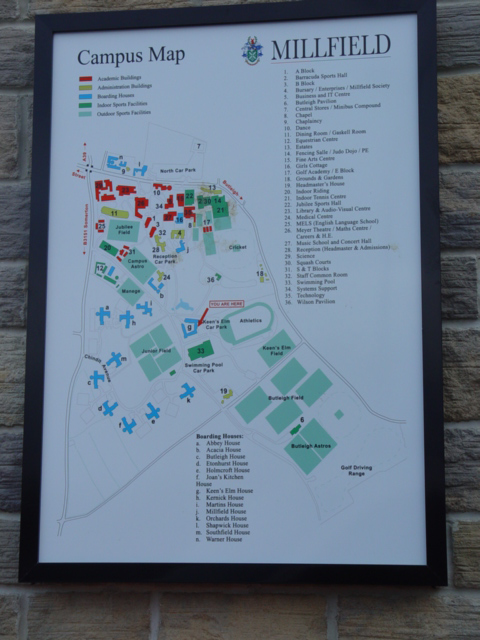
A map of the campus showing the facilities

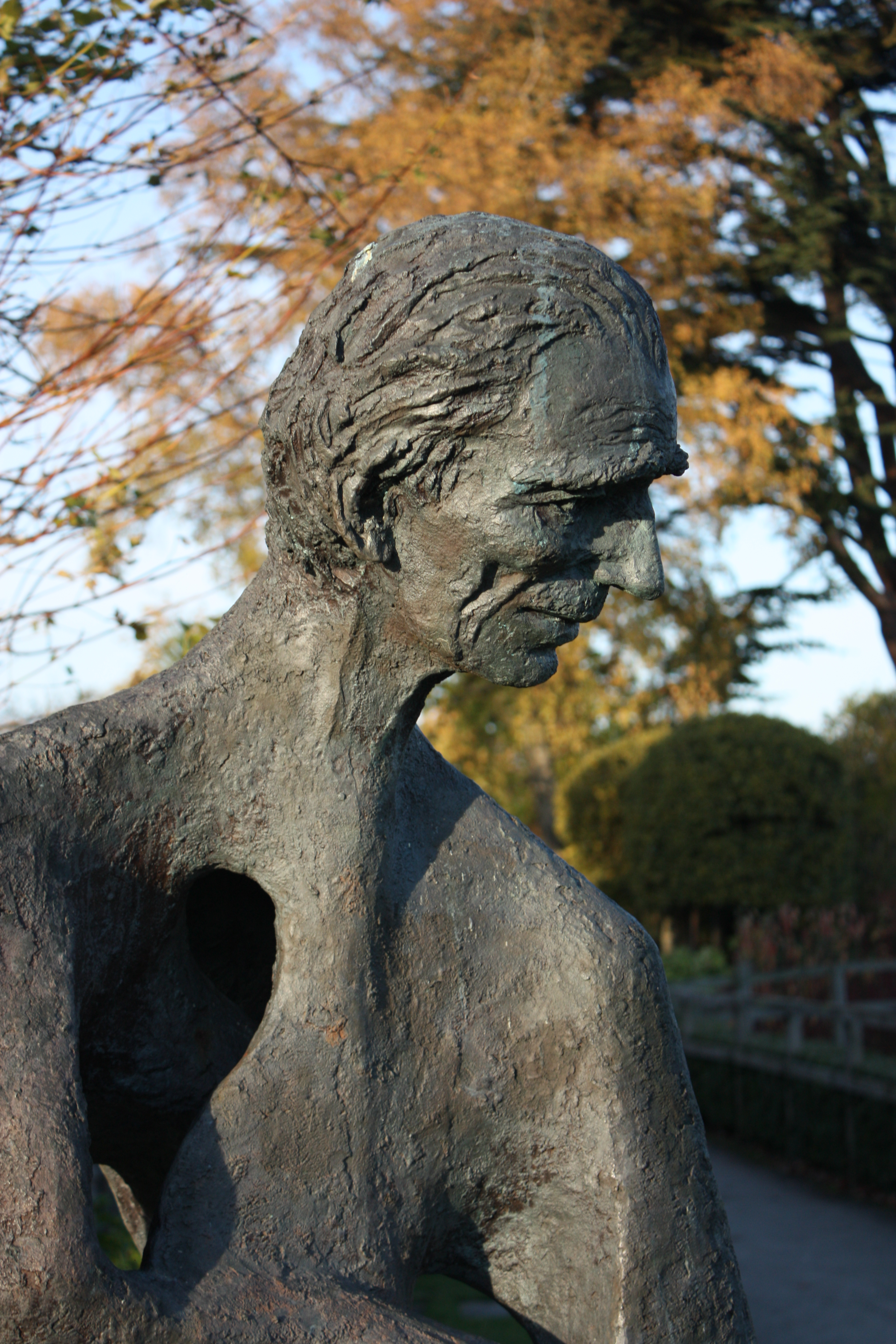
Boss Meyer's bust outside Millfield House

== Arms ==
Coat of arms of Millfield
Crest On a wreath Argent and Azure kn a mount vert a windmill Gules between two branches of hawthorn Proper. Escutcheon Vert the sails of a windmill saltirewise between four crosses bottonee Argent. Motto Molire Molendo (Success by Grinding)
