= Bartu (name) =

Bartu is a Turkish surname and a male given name. Its meaning is existence and the destination. Notable people with the name include:

== Surname ==
- Can Bartu (1936–2019), Turkish basketball and football player
- Jan Bártů (born 1955), Czech pentathlete and coach
- Joplo Bartu (born 1989), American football player
- Karel Bártů (1916–2008), Czech pentathlete

== Given name ==
- Bartu Elci-Ozsoy, Turkish-French violinist, conductor, and composer.
