= List of programmes broadcast by Cartoon Network (India) =

This is a list of television programs currently and formerly broadcast by Cartoon Network in India. The network was launched on 1 May 1995 and airs mainly animated programmings.

A variation of Cartoon Network's current logo, which resembles the network's original logo, used since 2010.

== Current programming ==
- Banbudh Aur Budbak
- Ben 10
  - Ben 10 (2005)
  - Ben 10: Alien Force
  - Ben 10: Ultimate Alien
  - Ben 10: Omniverse
- Bionic Max
- Courage the Cowardly Dog
- Digimon Adventure
- Dragon Ball
- Dragon Ball Super
- Dragon Ball Z
- Dragon Ball Z Kai
- Grizzy & the Lemmings
- Larva
- Lamput
- My Hero Academia
- One Piece
- Scooby-Doo
- Teen Titans
- Teen Titans Go!
- The Tom and Jerry Show

== Former programming ==
=== Animated series ===
- 2 Stupid Dogs
- The 13 Ghosts of Scooby-Doo
- 50/50 Heroes
- The Addams Family
- The Adventures of Chhota Birbal
- The Adventures of Tenali Raman
- The Adventures of Tintin
- Adventure Time
- Akbar and Birbal
- The All New Popeye Hour
- Alvin and the Chipmunks
- Amar Chitra Katha
- The Amazing World of Gumball
- Andy Pandy
- Angelina Ballerina
- Angelo Rules
- Angry Birds Toons
- Animal Control
- Animalia
- Anpanman
- Apple & Onion
- Aqua Teen Hunger Force
- Archie's Weird Mysteries
- Astro Boy
- The Avengers: Earth's Mightiest Heroes
- Baby Looney Tunes
- The Backyardigans
- Bakugan Battle Brawlers
- Bakugan Battle Brawlers: New Vestroia
- Bandbudh Aur Budbak
- Batman: The Animated Series
- Batman Beyond
- Batman: The Brave and the Bold
- Batwheels
- Battle B-Daman
- Be Cool, Scooby-Doo!
- Beast Machines: Transformers
- Beat Monsters
- Ben 10 (2005)
- Ben 10 (2016)
- Ben 10: Alien Force
- Ben 10: Omniverse
- Ben 10: Ultimate Alien
- Beware the Batman
- Beyblade
- Beyblade: Metal Fusion
- Birdman and the Galaxy Trio
- Blue Dragon
- Bob the Builder
- Bob the Builder: Project: Build It
- Bobobo-bo Bo-bobo
- Boo!
- The Brak Show
- The Bugs Bunny Show
- Camp Lazlo
- Capeta
- Captain Planet and the Planeteers
- Cardcaptor Sakura
- Chowder
- Clarence
- Cloudy with a Chance of Meatballs
- Code Lyoko
- Codename: Kids Next Door
- Courage the Cowardly Dog
- Cow and Chicken
- Craig of the Creek
- Crime Time
- Dabangg
- DC Super Hero Girls
- DC Super Hero Girls: Super Hero High
- Dexter's Laboratory
- Digimon
- Digimon Adventure
- Dragon Ball
- Dragon Ball GT
- Dragon Ball Kai
- Dragon Ball Super
- Dragon Ball Z
- Dragon Tales
- DreamWorks Dragons
- Duck Dodgers
- Duel Masters
- Ed, Edd n Eddy
- Ekans – Snakes Awake'
- Exchange Student Zero
- Fantastic Max
- Firehouse Tales
- Fish Police
- The Flintstones
- The Flintstone Comedy Show
- The Flintstone Funnies
- The Flintstone Kids
- Foster's Home for Imaginary Friends
- Franklin
- Fred Flintstone and Friends
- Fukrey Boyzzz
- G.I. Joe: A Real American Hero (1983)
- G.I. Joe: A Real American Hero (1989)
- Galtar and the Golden Lance
- Garfield and Friends
- Generator Rex
- Gon
- Green Lantern: The Animated Series
- The Grim Adventures of Billy & Mandy and Haddi Mera Buddy (My friend Grim)
- Grim & Evil
- Hagemaru
- Harry and His Bucket Full of Dinosaurs
- Harvey Birdman, Attorney at Law
- He-Man and the Masters of the Universe
- Heidi
- The Herculoids
- Hero: 108
- Hi Hi Puffy AmiYumi
- Hikari Sentai Maskman
- Home Movies
- Hong Kong Phooey
- Horrid Henry
- Hot Wheels: AcceleRacers
- Hot Wheels Battle Force 5
- Hunter × Hunter
- I Am Weasel
- Inazuma Eleven
- Iron Man: Armored Adventures
- Jackie Chan Adventures
- Jellystone!
- The Jetsons
- Johnny Bravo
- Johnny Test
- Jonny Quest
- Josie and the Pussycats
- Jumanji
- Jungle Tales
- Justice League
- Justice League Action
- Justice League Unlimited
- Kaiketsu Zorori
- Kiba
- Kid Krrish
- Kipper the Dog
- Kiteretsu
- The Koala Brothers
- Krish, Trish and Baltiboy
- Krypto the Superdog
- Lamput
- The Land Before Time
- Larva
- League of Super Evil
- Legends of Chima
- The Legend of Snow White
- Lego Ninjago: Masters of Spinjitzu
- The Life and Times of Juniper Lee
- Looney Tunes
- Looney Tunes Cartoons
- The Looney Tunes Show
- Maca & Roni
- Mad: The Animated Series
- Make Way for Noddy
- Mao Mao: Heroes of Pure Heart
- The Marvelous Misadventures of Flapjack
- The Mask: Animated Series
- Matt Hatter Chronicles
- Max Steel (2000)
- Max Steel (2013)
- Mechamato
- Megas XLR
- Men in Black: The Series
- Mighty Magiswords
- Mike, Lu & Og
- Miss Spider's Sunny Patch Friends
- Mix Master
- Mixels
- Mobile Suit Gundam
- Moby Dick and Mighty Mightor
- The Moxy Show
- Mr. Bean: The Animated Series
- Mr. Magoo
- ¡Mucha Lucha!
- The Mummy: The Animated Series
- My Gym Partner's a Monkey
- My Hero Academia
- My Knight and Me
- Naruto
- Nate Is Late
- The New Adventures of Captain Planet
- The New Adventures of Hanuman'
- The New Adventures of Jonny Quest
- The New Adventures of Speed Racer
- The New Batman Adventures
- The New Fred and Barney Show
- The New Scooby and Scrappy-Doo Show
- The New Scooby-Doo Movies
- Ninja Robots
- Obocchama Kun
- Oggy and the Cockroaches
- OK K.O.! Let's Be Heroes
- One Piece
- Oswald
- Over the Garden Wall
- Ozzy & Drix
- The Pebbles and Bamm-Bamm Show
- The Perils of Penelope Pitstop
- Pet Alien
- Pingu
- Pinky and the Brain
- Pinky, Elmyra & the Brain
- The Plucky Duck Show
- Pokémon
- Popeye and Son
- Popeye the Sailor
- The Popeye Show
- The Porky Pig Show
- Postman Pat
- The Powerpuff Girls (1998)
- The Powerpuff Girls (2016)
- Powerpuff Girls Z
- A Pup Named Scooby-Doo
- The Real Adventures of Jonny Quest
- Regular Show
- Richie Rich
- Ricochet Rabbit & Droop-a-Long
- The Road Runner Show
- Robotboy
- Roll No 21
- Rubbadubbers
- Running Man
- Sabrina: The Animated Series
- Samurai Jack
- Scooby-Doo and Guess Who?
- Scooby-Doo! Mystery Incorporated
- Scooby-Doo and Scrappy-Doo (1979)
- Scooby-Doo and Scrappy-Doo (1980)
- The Scooby-Doo Show
- Scooby-Doo, Where Are You!
- Sealab 2021
- Secret Mountain Fort Awesome
- The Secret Saturdays
- Shaggy & Scooby-Doo Get a Clue!
- Shazzan
- Sheep in the Big City
- Sitting Ducks
- Skunk Fu!
- The Smurfs
- Sonic Boom
- Space Ghost
- Space Ghost Coast to Coast
- The Spectacular Spider-Man
- Spider-Man: The New Animated Series
- Star Wars: Clone Wars
- Star Wars: The Clone Wars
- Static Shock
- Steven Universe
- Steven Universe Future
- Strawberry Shortcake
- Stuart Little: The Animated Series
- Summer Camp Island
- Super Bheem
- Super Friends
- The Super Hero Squad Show
- Super Shiro
- Superman: The Animated Series
- Supernoobs
- SWAT Kats: The Radical Squadron
- The Sylvester & Tweety Mysteries
- Sym-Bionic Titan
- Taffy
- Taz-Mania
- TDPI
- Teen Titans
- Teen Titans Go!
- Teenage Mutant Ninja Turtles
- Thomas & Friends
- ThunderCats (1985)
- ThunderCats (2011)
- ThunderCats Roar
- Tik Tak Tail
- Time Squad
- Tiny Toon Adventures
- Tom and Jerry
- Tom and Jerry (2023)
- The Tom and Jerry Comedy Show
- Tom & Jerry Kids
- Tom and Jerry in New York
- The Tom and Jerry Show (1975)
- The Tom and Jerry Show (2014)
- Tom and Jerry Tales
- Top Cat
- Transformers: Animated
- Transformers: Armada
- Transformers: Cybertron
- Transformers: Cyberverse
- Transformers: Energon
- Transformers: Prime
- Transformers: Robots in Disguise
- Trouble Chocolate
- Ultimate Muscle
- Uncle Grandpa
- Unikitty!
- Victor and Valentino
- We Baby Bears
- We Bare Bears
- What a Cartoon!
- What's New, Scooby-Doo?
- Whatever Happened to... Robot Jones?
- Wolverine and the X-Men
- Wow! Wow! Wubbzy!
- Xiaolin Chronicles
- Xiaolin Showdown
- X-Men: Evolution
- Yo-kai Watch
- The Yogi Bear Show
- Yogi's Treasure Hunt
- Young Justice
- Zatch Bell!

=== Live-action/mixed ===
- Cambala Investigation Agency
- Chouseishin Gransazer
- Galli Galli Sim Sim
- Genseishin Justirisers
- Sazer X
- Skatoony
- Teletubbies

== Films ==
- Arnab aur Jadui Locket (2014)
- Bhootraja Aur Ronnie 2 (2014)
- Chakra: The Invincible (2013)
- Kid Krrish (2013)
- Kid Krrish: Mission Bhutan (2014)
- Kid Krrish: Mystery in Mongolia (2014)
- Kid Krrish: Shakalaka Africa (2015)
- Krishna: The Birth (2006)
- Krishna in Vrindavan (2007)
- Krishna: Kansa Vadha (2007)
- Krishna: Maakhan Chor (2007)
- My Name Is Raj (2011)
- My Name Is Raj 2 (2012)
- My Name Is Raj 3: Attack of Demons (2013)
- My Name Is Raj 4: Vizukama Ki Takaar (2014)
- My Name is Raj 5: Return of Zohak (2015)
- Vikram Betal (2005)
- Tripura - The Three Cities of Maya (2011)

== Specials ==
- Mangal Pandey Special (2005)
- Johnny Goes to Bollywood (2009)
- Kris Aur Sharukhan Khan Ki Dilwale Bollywood Class (2015)
- Oggy Ki Birthday Party (2015)
- Dragon Ball Z Blockbuster (2023)

== Programming blocks ==
Title	Year(s) aired	Note(s)
Night Shift	2001–2002	
Toonami	2001–2010	Got separate channel in 2015
Acme Hour	2001–2002	
Tiny TV	2003–2004	Shifted to Pogo in 2004
Half Ticket Express	2005–2007	
Thoda Meow Thoda Bow	2005–2007	
Boomerang	2007	
Cartoon Network Popcorn	2009	
Happy Birthday Cartoon Network	2015	
Morning Laughter Club	2022	
Superhero Summer	2023	
Big Block Anime	2024	

== See also ==
- List of programmes broadcast by Discovery Kids (India)
