= Batu (surname) =

Batu is a Turkish surname. The Turkish Language Association defines it as superior, victorious and powerful. Notable people with the surname include:

- İnal Batu (1936–2013), Turkish diplomat and politician
- Jennifer Batu (born 1993), Franco-Congolese athlete
- Pelin Batu (born 1978), Turkish actress

== See also ==
- Bartu (name), list of people with a similar name
