= David Halen =

American violinist (born 1959)

- Born: October 1, 1959 (age 65); Bellevue, Ohio
- Genres: Classical
- Occupation(s): Violinist, teacher, concertmaster of the St. Louis Symphony Orchestra
- Instrument: 1753 Giovanni Battista Guadagnini violin

David Halen (born 1959) is an American violinist and concertmaster of the St. Louis Symphony Orchestra.

== Early life and education ==
Halen was born in Bellevue, Ohio and grew up in Warrensburg, Missouri. Both of his parents were violinists; his father, Walter J. Halen, taught violin at Central Missouri State University and his mother, Thalia, played violin with the Kansas City Symphony for 30 years. He earned his bachelor's degree at the age of 19 from Central Missouri State University where he studied with his father, and then earned his master's degree from the University of Illinois Urbana-Champaign where he studied with Sergiu Luca. He then was granted a Fulbright scholarship to study with Wolfgang Marschner at the Hochschule für Musik Freiburg in Germany, and was the youngest recipient ever to earn the prestigious award.

== Career ==
From 1982 until 1991, he served as assistant concertmaster of the Houston Symphony and was named concertmaster of the St. Louis Symphony Orchestra in 1995, without audition, by the orchestra and with the endorsements of then-music directors Leonard Slatkin and Hans Vonk.

Halen has appeared as soloist with the orchestras of St. Louis, WDR in Cologne, San Francisco Symphony, Houston, Detroit, and Toronto. Additionally, he has served as the violinist in the Eliot Trio of Washington University in St. Louis with cellist Bjorn Ranheim and pianist Seth Carlin.

In 2002 Halen received the Saint Louis Arts and Entertainment Award for excellence. In the fall of 2012, Halen joined the string faculty of the University of Michigan School of Music, Theatre & Dance. In addition, he teaches at the Aspen Music Festival and School in the summer, and co-founded the Innsbrook Institute in Innsbrook, Missouri, where he serves as artistic director.

Halen is also the artistic director for the Missouri River Festival of the Arts in Boonville, Missouri, held annually at the historic Thespian Hall.

Halen plays on a 1753 Giovanni Battista Guadagnini violin made in Milan, Italy.

== Personal life ==
Halen is married to Korean-born soprano Miran Cha Halen and has a son, Christopher.
