= Abhimanyu Ki Alien Family =

- Promotional poster
- Genre: Science fiction Comedy
- Created by: Hi-Tech Animation
- Written by: Gaurav Malani; Seema Malani; Gulzar (title track)
- Directed by: Abhijit Daripkar; Santosh Pednekar
- Voices of: Jasleen Singh; Merlin James; Mohit Sinha; Roop Thakkar; Sanchit Wartak; Asavari Ajinkya; Pratik Verma
- Theme music composer: Simaab Sen
- Country of origin: India
- Original language: Various

Production
- Executive producers: Anu Sikka; Ashish Thapar
- Production company: Hi-Tech Animation

Original release
- Network: Nickelodeon India
- Release: April 24, 2023

Abhimanyu Ki Alien Family is an Indian animated television science fiction comedy series, directed by Abhijit Daripkar and Santosh Pednekar for Nickelodeon India. The series revolves around the adventures of Abhimanyu, a 12-year-old boy who can transform into an alien. The show follows his efforts to integrate into human society, make friends, conceal his true identity, and overcome challenges. The lyrics for the title track of the series are written by lyricist Gulzar and the music is created by Simaab Sen. The series premiered on 24 April 2023.

It is the first Indian science fiction comedy series in the kids' category that is based on an extraterrestrial theme.

== Synopsis ==
The series portrays the story of Abhimanyu, a 12-year-old boy who can transform into an alien. It showcases his journey of fitting in with humans, making friends, hiding his true identity, and overcoming challenges, while also highlighting his family's struggles to adapt. The characters are portrayed in both human and alien avatars.

== Characters ==
- Abhimanyu (Voiced by Jasleen Singh): A smart problem-solver and the strongest alien in the group. He possesses super strength but must hide his abilities to maintain his human facade. Abhimanyu also has the power to assimilate powers from objects, albeit with occasional chaos and confusion.
- Arya (Voiced by Merlin James): The first-in-command on the Earth mission, acting as the eyes and ears of Supremo. Arya's elastic tongue aids her in solving problems and completing daily tasks.
- Naveen (Voiced by Mohit Sinha): Capable of turning anyone into a statue with a touch, Naveen struggles with physical contact and often appears timid and clumsy.
- Kookie (Voiced by Roop Thakkar): Possessing the power to push massive objects and manipulate wind, Kookie uses her abilities for daily convenience. She is fascinated by Earthlings' fashion sense and enjoys shopping.
- Supremo of Planet Zonga (Voiced by Sanchit Wartak): The disciplined commander of the aliens' Earth mission, instructing them to maintain human forms while on Earth.
- Mr. Ghotala (Voiced by Sanchit Wartak): The neighbor of the Kumar family. He is an alien research scientist and is always suspicious that aliens are around. His catchphrase is "Aiga!".
- Mrs. Ghotala (Voiced by Asavari Ajinkya): The neighbor and a friend of the Kumar family, especially Kookie. Her catchphrase is "Sahi samay par sahi jagah tapakne ki toh meri aadat hai!".
- Ronnie (Voiced by Pratik Verma): The son of Mr. and Mrs. Ghotala, a cocky and self-obsessed bully who uses his height and eccentric fashion sense to trouble others.He is enemy of Abhimanyu.

== Production ==
The series is produced by Viacom18's Kids TV Network and distributed by Nickelodeon. It is conceptualized by Hi-Tech Animation and was produced using 3D animation techniques with 2D rendering.

== Episodes list ==
No.	Title
S1 1	Being human
S1 2	Ghotala dinner
S1 3	Alien sunglasses
S1 4	Beware of dog
S1 5	Charge ho jao
S1 6	Shaana kauwa
S1 7	Mehman nawazi
S1 8	Aunty ya alien
S1 9	Alien trap
S1 10	Rain rain
S1 11	Alien rescue
S1 12	Zubaan sambhal ke
S1 13	Aasmaan se girra
S1 14	Apni kursi sambhalo
S1 15	Abhimanyu supercharged
S1 16	Mamla jam gaya
S1 17	Earth pe atka
S1 18	Bhoot bangla
S1 19	Chakkar kumar ka
S1 20	Khel khel mein
S1 21	Double Ghotala
S1 22	Hawa Hawai
S1 23	Alien tree
S1 24	Ankhiyon se goli maare
S1 25	Cross connection
S1 26	Batti gul
S1 27	Car ka karnama
S1 28	Bee se bachao
S1 29	Alien festival
S1 30	Kite Flying
S1 31	Nimbu petrol
S1 32	Aadha adhura
S1 33	Beware of chair
S1 34	Rat race
S1 35	Alien hunter Ronnie
S1 36	Chori chori chupke chupke
S1 37	Tommy se panga
S1 38	Choti si baat
S1 39	Watch out
S1 40	Zordaar Zumba
S1 41	Lucky stone
S1 42	Rob The Robot
S1 43	Ek Din Ka Human
S1 44	Family No.1
S1 45	Ghotala's uncle
S1 46	Chabi Kho Jae
S1 47	Dog saliva
S1 48	Robot Yaa Alien
S1 49	Naveen Bade Darshan Chote
S1 50	Cooking With Kookie
S1 51	Low Gravity
S1 52	Holi Hai
S1 53	Taang Ada Ke
S1 54	Naveen ka Ghotala
S1 55	Kookie Ka Haircut
S1 56	Alien Bana Superhero
S1 57	Power On Off
S1 58	Dinosaur Zinda Hain
S1 59	Yoga Se Hi Hoga
S1 60	Tote Udd Gaye
S1 61	Tower Ka Terror
S1 62	Machli Phas Gayi
S1 63	Jungle Mein Dangal
S1 64	Pipe Burst
S1 65	Kookie's Practice Session
S1 66	Arya 2.0
S1 67	Cafe Galactica
S1 68	Zhumbak Power
S1 69	Haye Garmi
S1 70	Happy Birthday Kumar
S1 71	Food truck frenzy
S1 72	Naveen Ka Horror
S1 73	Zonga Ki Keede
S1 74	Zor Ka Jhatka
S1 75	Plastic To Elastic
S1 76	Chumbak ka zumbak
S1 77	Mehmaan badal gaya
S1 78	Boat Battle
S1 79	TV trouble
S1 80	Hockey horror
S1 81	Loka
S1 82	Arya In The Limelight
S1 83	Gol ghuma diya
S1 84	Naveen ki chhutti
S1 85	Power Booster
S1 86	Daant deni padhegi
S1 87	Alien ki insaniyat
S1 88	Construction chaos
S1 89	Census Sangharsh
S1 90	Diwali Alienwali
S1 91	Chipku chipki
S1 92	Bhool Gayi Cookie
S1 93	Fool ya cool
S1 94	Tina ki zid
S1 95	Genius friendship
S1 96	Dream drama
S1 97	Buaji
S1 98	Hasna Mana Hai
S1 99	Nakalbazi
S1 100	Merry Christmas
S1 101	Problem party
S1 102	Handi Phod
S1 103	Halloween Hungama
S1 104	Mission sleep
S1 105	School mein battery down
S1 106	Tiffin Trouble
S1 107	Monitor kaun banega
S1 108	Udan Choo
S1 109	Ghanti Bajj Gayi
S1 110	First day at school
S1 111	Cricket Match
S1 112	Mani bhula Money
S1 113	Inspection Destruction
S1 114	Halloween Heropanti
S1 115	Alienpanti Ki No Entry
S1 116	Achar Chor Supremo
S1 117	Mutter Mania
S1 118	Genius Solution
S1 119	Abhimanyu Ki Cut Cut
S1 120	Zada Udd Mat
S1 121	Pranks Ka Panchnama
S1 122	Camp Vamp Chair Vair
S1 123	Parent Teacher Meeting
S1 124	Supremo School Surprise
S1 125	Chocolate Day
S1 126	Dramebaaz Abhimanyu
S1 127	Principal Supremo
S1 128	Shahi Swagat
S1 129	Alien Watch
S1 130	Trekking Tashan Premaster
S1 131	White Uniform
S1 132	Monkey trouble
S1 133	Alien Project
S1 134	Chalk Ka Chor
S1 135	Alien Master
S1 136	Billi Ki Khoj
S1 137	Alien ki Bow Bow
S1 138	Mascot Masti
S1 139	Lunch Monitor Mona
S1 140	Picnic Problem
S1 141	Tinku Ka Birthday Wish
S1 142	Tinku se Tooti Friendship
S1 143	London ka Tension
S1 144	Hathoda Ka Makoda
S1 145	Naveen Under Pressure
S1 146	Mother's Day
S1 147	Khana Khake Jaana
S1 148	Baal Ki Khaal
S1 149	Adla Badli
S1 150	Alien acche hote hai
S1 151	Navin Ka pehla Job
S1 152	Bandar Bawal
S1 153	Space Mein No Space
S1 154	Chance Pe Dance
S1 155	Space Mein Ghotala
S1 156	Badlu Ka Badla
S1 157	Hum Hai Rahi VR Ke
S1 158	Supremo Ka Wallet
S1 159	Alien Ghotala
S1 160	When Jimmy Met Commet
S1 161	Tunta Munta
S1 162	Age ka Aflaatoonv
S1 163	Supremo ki Gaadi
S1 164	Bouncer Idea

== Reception ==
In an article for Outlook India, Garima Das included the show, Abhimanyu Ki Alien Family in her list titled "5 Movies And Shows A Sci-Fi Lover Should Definitely Watch." Das highlighted the show's intriguing premise, stating, "What makes it interesting is the challenges faced by the alien team as they navigate the complexities of human life, forge friendships, conceal their true identities, and overcome various adversities and threats."

== See also ==
- List of programmes broadcast by Nickelodeon (India)
- List of Indian animated television series
