= Seth Carlin =

American pianist (1945–2016)

- Born: February 8, 1945; East Orange, New Jersey, U.S.
- Died: July 28, 2016 (aged 71) Mont-de-Marsan, France
- Occupations: Pianist, music professor
- Instruments: Piano, fortepiano

Seth Carlin (February 8, 1945 – July 28, 2016) was an American pianist and fortepianist. A student of Morton Estrin, Jules Gentil, Wilhelm Kempff, and Rosina Lhévinne, Carlin was especially noted for his performances of the music of Schubert. He appeared on French, Swedish, Chinese and German national television and radio and performed as soloist with orchestras including the Boston Pops and St. Louis Symphony under such conductors as Leonard Slatkin and Nicholas McGegan. He was a prizewinner in the Ferruccio Busoni International Piano Competition and the International Tchaikovsky Competition, and performed a complete cycle of Schubert piano sonatas in New York broadcast by NPR.

== Early life and education ==
A native of East Orange, New Jersey, Carlin began playing piano at the age of 6. At the age of 9, he made his public debut on New York radio station WNYC.

Carlin studied at the École Normale de Musique de Paris with Jules Gentil. He earned a bachelor's degree in music from Harvard University in 1969 and a master's degree in piano from the Juilliard School in 1970. He studied with Rosina Lhévinne, Wilhelm Kempff and Morton Estrin.

== Career ==
In 1973, Carlin won fifth prize at the Ferruccio Busoni International Piano Competition. He was a semifinalist in the International Tchaikovsky Competition in 1970. In 1977, he made his debut recital in New York, performing all three of Schubert's last sonatas. He taught at Hiram College and Phillips Exeter Academy before joining Washington University in St. Louis as director of the piano program in 1979.

In 1989, Carlin was one of two winners of a recitalist grant from the National Endowment for the Arts. From 1991-1992, he performed the complete cycle of Schubert piano sonatas on fortepiano in five concerts in New York; these concerts were broadcast on NPR. In 1992, he performed at Lincoln Center's Alice Tully Hall; his performance was described by The New York Times as "sparklingly transparent".

Carlin appeared as soloist with conductors Roger Norrington, Nicholas McGegan and Leonard Slatkin with such orchestras as the Boston Pops, St. Louis Symphony Orchestra, San Francisco Philharmonia Baroque. He was the soloist in the St. Louis Symphony premiere of Dmitri Shostakovich's Piano Concerto No. 2. Additionally he performed in recital with such artists as Pinchas Zukerman, Yo-Yo Ma, James Buswell, Anner Bylsma and Malcolm Bilson. Additionally, Carlin was a founding member of the Eliot Trio of Washington University with violinist David Halen and cellist Bjorn Ranheim.

== Personal life and death ==
Carlin was married to harpsichordist Maryse Carlin, and had two children. He died following a swimming accident in Mont-de-Marsan, France on July 28, 2016, at the age of 71.
