= St Andrew's Church, Edgarley =

Church in Somerset, England

St Andrew's Church
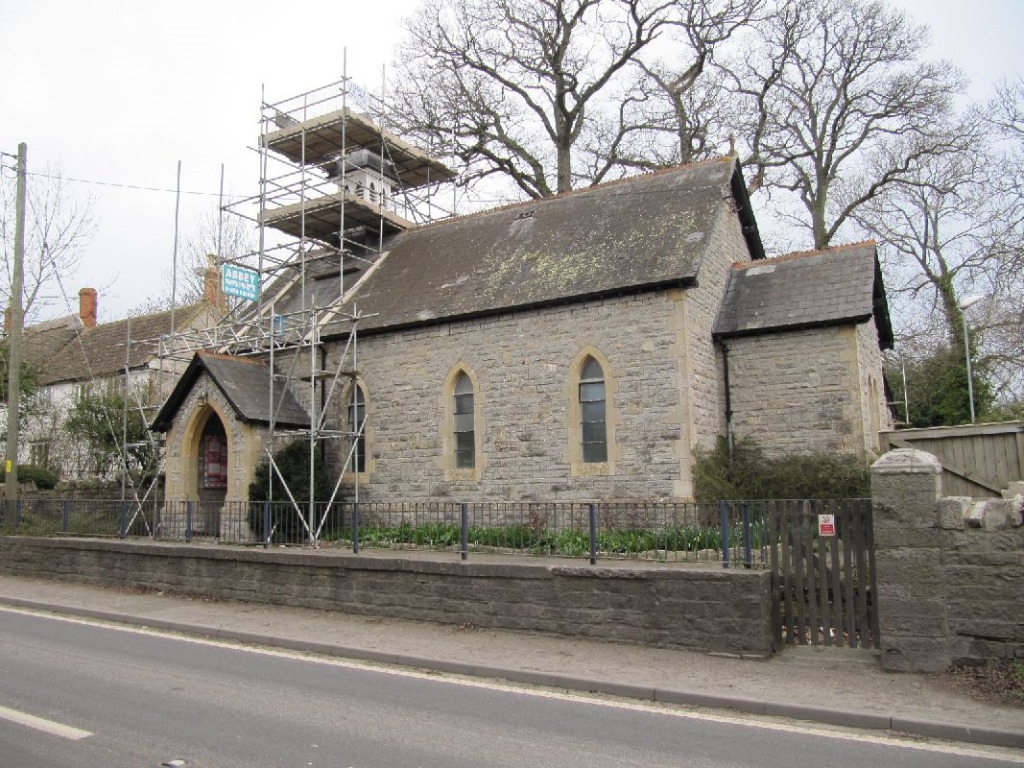

Religion
- Affiliation: Church of England
- Ecclesiastical or organizational status: Private

Location
- Location: Edgarley, Somerset, England
- Interactive map of St Andrew's Church
- Coordinates: 51.1399°N 2.6894°W

Architecture
- Type: Church
- Completed: 1897

St Andrew's Church is a former Church of England mission church in Edgarley, Somerset, England. It was built in 1897 and is now used as a private chapel by Millfield Preparatory School.

== History ==
St Andrew's was built in 1897 as a mission church connected to St John's in Glastonbury. It was built to serve the inhabitants of Edgarley and Havyatt, all of whom were at least a mile and a half away from St John's. The idea for the mission church/room stemmed back to around 1892, when Edward Bath offered the parish vicar Rev. Charles Sydenham Ross a plot of land at Havyatt. Although the offer was accepted, the scheme failed to make any progress owing to Rev. Ross' poor health. After his death in 1893, his successor, Rev. Henry Lowry Barnwell, took up the scheme in 1894.

Rev. Barnwell considered the site at Havyatt to be too far away from St John's and he subsequently accepted an alternative site at Edgarley from Mr. J. A. Porch. To determine whether there was sufficient demand for a mission church to be built, Mr. Porch allowed weekly services to be held in a nearby room, then in a newly built coach house. The services were well-attended and preparations towards the church's construction began in 1895. The borough surveyor, Mr. G. Alves, drew up the plans for a church capable of accommodating 100 people and Mr. R. T. Fisher was hired as the builder.

By September 1895, around £75 of an estimated £150 had been raised towards the building fund, and this sum had risen to over £84 by December 1895. Fundraising continued during 1896, which included a rummage sale held at St John's parish room in April and an amateur drama performance held in the Assembly Rooms in May. In June 1896, the Bath and Wells Diocesan Church Building Society granted £20 towards the fund.

Construction of the church was carried out in 1897 and it opened for Divine service on 30 November 1897, when the Bishop of Bath and Wells, the Right Rev. George Kennion, dedicated it to St Andrew. It cost £260 to build, of which £50 had left to be raised at time of opening. In order to allow the building to be used for functions as well as services, the nave and chancel were separated by folding doors.

On 5 December 1954, the Bishop of Bath and Wells, the Right Rev. Harold Bradfield, consecrated a new altar at the church, which was gifted by the governors of Millfield School. The school, which was established in 1945 at Edgarley Hall, began using St Andrew's from an early time. The chapel is now used for services and ceremonies in connection with the school.

== Architecture ==
St Andrew's is built of Blue Lias stone with freestone dressings. The building measures 36 feet by 18 feet and has a bell-cot on the roof. There are four windows on the north side, three on the south, and one each on the west and east sides. The entrance is through a porch on the south side. The roof beams and all original wooden furnishings are made of pitch pine.
