= Guadagnino =

Guadagnino is a surname. Notable people with the surname include:

- Kathy Guadagnino (born 1961), American golfer
- Luca Guadagnino (born 1971), Italian director and screenwriter
- Vinny Guadagnino (born 1987), American Jersey Shore star and actor

== See also ==
- Guadagnini (surname)
