= Enrico Marchetti =

Enrico Marchetti (1855–1930) was a violin maker from Turin, Italy. He was born in Milan, and is regarded as one of the finest violin makers of the Guadagnini school.

Marchetti was first taught by Milanese violin makers Bajoni and Rossi. Marchetti later moved to Turin and learned from Antonio Guadagnini.
