= Li-Kuo Chang =

- Born: July 25, 1949 (age 76)
- Origin: Shanghai, China
- Genres: Classical Music
- Occupation: Violist at Chicago Symphony Orchestra
- Instrument: Viola

== Early life and studies ==
Li-Kuo Chang, born in Shanghai, China, on January 25, 1949, began his studies at the Shanghai Conservatory in piano and violin. In 1978, his playing gained him the first prize in the Chinese Young Artist Competition. He traveled to the U.S. in 1979 to study at Eastman School of Music in New York where he was awarded a full-tuition scholarship. He also received a young artist fellowship to study at California's Music Academy of the West. Li-Kuo has studied with renowned teachers such as Francis Tursi, Paul Doktor, Donald McInnes, William Magers, Milton Thomas, and has also played in master classes led by William Primrose.

== Career ==
In his early career, Li-Kuo was a member of the Shanghai Symphony Orchestra. Winning the audition in 1988, he has held the position of assistant principal violist in the Chicago Symphony Orchestra, and between 1998 and 1999, he served as the viola section principal. He has been on the faculty at many prestigious schools, including Northwestern University's Bienen School of Music (1993–2008), Roosevelt University (1998-), and Peabody Institute (2011-), and he presently teaches at the Music Institute of Chicago in Illinois. He has also been an affiliate of the faculty at Affinis Music Festival in Japan since 1992. He is also the Artistic Advisor of the Chinese Fine Arts Society. Many of his students were awarded various positions in well-known orchestras, including the Indianapolis Symphony Orchestra, Chicago Symphony Orchestra, St. Louis Symphony, and Detroit Symphony Orchestra.

== Performances and collaborations ==
Li-Kuo has performed alongside and worked with many well-known artists, including Daniel Barenboim, Pinchas Zukerman, Gabor Rejto, Christoph Eschenbach, and Henry Tamianka. He has given performances in many locations, including the Ravinia Music Festival, Staatsoper in Berlin, Orchestra Hall in Chicago's Symphony Center, Jerusalem Chamber Music Festival, and Lucerne Music Festival. His instrument is a G.B. Guadagnini viola, which was made in Turin in 1770.

== Personal life ==
Li-Kuo lives in Chicago with his wife, Maggie, and their son, Daniel.
