= Giovanni Battista Guadagnini =

Italian luthier

- Born: 23 June 1711; Bilegno in Val Tidone, Italy
- Died: 18 September 1786 (aged 75); Turin, Italy
- Known for: Luthier; pedagogue
- Notable work: Baron Knoop (1744, Piacenza); Ex-Lorenzo (c.1745, Piacenza); Baron Köhner (1752, Milan); Campoli, Grumiaux (1773, Turin); Salabue (1774, Turin); Bryant (1775, Turin)
- Style: Guadagnini style; Piacenza period; Milan period; Parma period; Turin period; Stradivarius style
- Movement: Guadagnini school
- Elected: Court luthier of Duchy of Parma
- Patrons: Duke of Parma; Count Cozio di Salabue
- Website: www.guadagnini.org

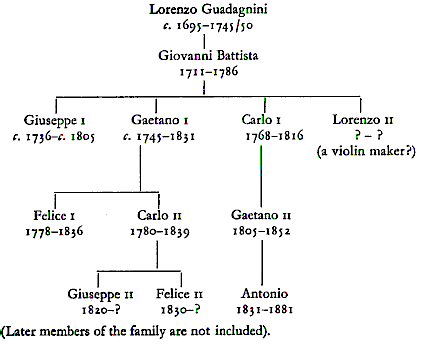
Guadagnini family tree

Giovanni Battista Guadagnini (often shortened to G. B. Guadagnini; 23 June 1711 – 18 September 1786) was an Italian luthier, regarded as one of the finest craftsmen of string instruments in history. The Guadagnini family was known for their violins, guitars and mandolins.

== Biography ==
Giovanni Battista Guadagnini was born on 23 June 1711, in the hamlet of Bilegno, in what is now the Province of Piacenza in Northern Italy. Both his life and his career can be divided into four distinct periods, which correspond to the four cities in which he would live and work, Piacenza, Milan, Parma, and Turin.

Almost nothing is known about his early years until he moved to the nearby city of Piacenza in 1738. In 1742, his first violins start to appear. It is unclear from whom or where he learned his trade. Since he joined the woodworking guild, it is likely that he underwent an apprenticeship with a local woodworker; however, there is no evidence of any local instrument makers in Piacenza at the time.

In 1749 Guadagnini moved to Milan, where he continued to make instruments. The reason for his move is unknown, but was perhaps economically motivated as Milan was a much larger city with a larger and more active music scene. During this time a few of his instruments bear labels implying a relationship to Cremona—the home of the renowned violin makers Amati, Stradivari, and Guarneri—however no evidence exists that Guadagnini ever lived in Cremona.

In 1758 Guadagnini moved again, this time to Parma. He may have been drawn to the city by the recent appointment of Carlo Ferarri, a close musician friend from his time in Piacenza, to a position with the Ducal Court. During his time in Parma Guadagnini was also closely connected to the court, and in particular to the musical patronage of the Prime Minister Guillaume du Tillot. In his later years in Parma Guadagnini even received a direct salary from the court. In 1771, with the Court's financial fortunes in decline, Guadagnini asked to be allowed to leave.

He next moved to Turin. Two years later, in 1773, he began his historically important relationship with notable violin collector Count Cozio. Cozio purchased most, if not all, of Guadagnini's output during this time, and also supplied him with most of his wood and other materials. His business partnership with Cozio ended in 1777, though they continued to have dealings with each other. The Count is likely responsible for Guadagnini's marked shift to a more Stradivari-like style during this time, both by pressuring Guadagnini to more closely copy Stradivari and by providing Guadagnini with access to examples of Stradivari's work.

Giovanni Battista Guadagnini died in Turin on 18 September 1786.

== Violin maker ==
Guadagnini's work is divided into four distinct periods, which correspond to the four cities in which he worked over the span of his career, Piacenza, Milan, Parma, and Turin. His work in each new city changed in response to the availability of materials, the needs of the local musicians, and finally in Turin, his relationship with Count Cozio. Stylistically Guadagnini's work is generally less refined and polished than that of makers such as the Amatis or Stradivari, however with the same focus on tonal success. He is generally considered to be the last of the great historical makers, ranking just behind Stradivari and Guarneri. He is also possibly the last of historical makers to have used a varnish similar to what was used by classical Cremonese makers.

His instruments have sold for over $2,000,000 at auction.

== Performers with Guadagnini instruments ==
Violinists

Violinist	Date & place of manufacture	Sobriquet	Comments	Reference
Madeline Adkins	1782	ex-Chardon	On loan from Gabrielle Israelievitch, previously played by Jacques Israelievitch	
Felix Ayo	1744			
Riccardo Brengola	1747, Piacenza	Contessa Crespi		
Adolf Brodsky	1751, Milan	ex-Brodsky		
Zakhar Bron	1757, Milan			
Chloe Chua	1753, Milan			
Bartu Elci-Ozsoy	1760	ex-Vidas	Loaned by Conservatoire de Paris. The violin, made by Giovanni Battista Guadagnini, was previously owned by Romanian-born violinist Raoul Georges Vidas (1901–1978) and was donated to the Conservatoire de Paris by the late virtuoso's mother Anna Vidas.	
Chloe Chua	1753		On Loan from the Rin Collection	
Amaury Coeytaux	1773			
Andrew Dawes, Robert Uchida	1770, Parma	Dawes, de Long Tearse		
Richard Deakin			English chamber musician and soloist, currently teaching at RAM in London, was using one in 1980s and likely still is.	
Dorothy DeLay	1778, Turin			
Julia Fischer	1742			
Carl Flesch	1750s	ex-Henri Vieuxtemps		
David Garrett	1772		In December 2007, Garrett fell after a performance and smashed his Guadagnini, which he had purchased four years earlier for US$1 million. He now uses it for mainly his outdoor crossover performances.	
Kai Gleusteen	1781	the tiger		
David Greed	1757		Owned by the Yorkshire Guadagini 1757 Syndicate.	
Arthur Grumiaux	1752	ex-Grumiaux		
David Halen	1753			
Jascha Heifetz	1741, Piacenza	ex-Heifetz	Provenance – by Rembert Wurlitzer in 1946 and Dario D'Attili in 1991	
Marlene Hemmer	1764			
Peter Herresthal	1753, Milan			
Willy Hess	1740s			
Joseph Joachim	1767, Parma	ex-Joachim		
Ida Kavafian	1751			
Bomsori Kim	1774, Turin			
David Kim	1757		On loan from The Philadelphia Orchestra	
Min-Jeong Koh	1767			
Goran Končar	1753, Milan			
Mikhail Kopelman	1773			
Jan Kubelik	1750	ex-Kubelik		
Pekka Kuusisto	1752		On loan from the Finnish Cultural Foundation	
Jack Liebeck	1785	ex-Wilhelmj		
Wayne Lin	1779, Turin			
Tasmin Little	1757, Milan			
Mauro Lopes Ferreira				
Haldon Martinson	1750		Being used in the Boston Symphony Orchestra	
Lorin Maazel	1783, Turin			
Stefan Milenkovich	1780, Turin			
Viktoria Mullova	1750			
Ginette Neveu			Purchased early spring, 1949. Involved in an air crash later that year, in which Neveu died. Scroll later apparently appeared in Paris, having changed hands several times.	
David Plantier	1766			
Simone Porter	1745		On loan from The Mandell Collection of Southern California	
William E. Pynchon	1779, Turin		Purchased 26 March 1957. Played in San Francisco Opera until 1998	
Linda Rosenthal	1772, Turin			
Leon Sametini	1751	ex-Sametini		
Mari Samuelsen	1773, Turin		On loan from ASAF (Anders Sveeas Charitable Foundation, Oslo).	
Stephanie Sant’Ambrogio	1757			
Mayumi Seiler	1740, Piacenza			
Ittai Shapira	1745, Piacenza			
Sini-Maaria Simonen	1760		On loan from the Finnish Cultural Foundation	
Roman Simovic	1752		On loan from Jonathan Moulds	
Yvonne Smeulers	1757		Called the "Lady S"	
Lara St. John	1779	Salabue	Called "The Resurrection" by St. John	
Lyndon Johnston Taylor	1777			
Veriko Tchumburidze	1756, Milan		loaned by Deutsche Stiftung Musikleben	
Henri Temianka	1752		Built based on the Petro Guarnerius model. Certificate of Joseph Vedral, violinmaker, Holland, 28 September 1929	
Vanessa-Mae	1761	Gizmo		
Pablo Valetti	1758			
Pavel Vernikov	1747, Piacenza	ex-Contessa Crespi, ex-Brengola	On loan from Fondazione Pro Canale. Worth $1.5 million in 2016. Stolen in December 2016.	
Henri Vieuxtemps	1750s	ex-Henri Vieuxtemps		
Henryk Wieniawski	1750	ex-Wieniawski		
Bob Wills	1784		Described as 157 years old when bought in 1941 for $3,000, Wills later claimed in an interview that he gave it away "to a friend of mine in Tayxas" and bought another for $5,000.	
Audrey Wright	1753	ex-Alsop	On loan from the Alsop Trust. Previously played by Madeline Adkins	
Eugène Ysaÿe	1754, Milan	ex-Eugène Ysaÿe		
Li Chuan Yun	1784		On loan from the Stradivari Society	
Elina Vähälä	1780			

Violists

- Li-Kuo Chang plays the 'ex-Vieuxtemps' G.B. Guadagnini viola, Parma c.1768.
- Geraldine Walther plays a G.B. Guadagnini viola, Turin 1774.

Cellists

- Nicolas Altstaedt plays a G.B. Guadagnini cello made in 1749 (body size: 70 centimeters)
- Natalie Clein plays the "Simpson" Guadagnini cello (1777).
- Kristina Reiko Cooper plays the "ex-Havemeyer" Guadagnini cello made in 1743.
- David Geringas plays a G.B. Guadagnini cello made in 1761.
- Maxine Neuman plays a 1772 Guadagnini.
- Han-na Chang plays the G.B. Guadagnini cello made in Milan in 1757.
- Gilberto Munguia plays a G.B. Guadagnini cello (1748).
- Saša Večtomov played a G.B. Guadagnini cello made in Milan in 1754.
- Sol Gabetta plays a G.B. Guadagnini cello (1759).
- Carter Brey, principal cellist of the New York Philharmonic Orchestra, plays a Guadagnini made in Milan in 1754.
- David Finckel plays a G.B. Guadagnini cello (1754)

Groups

- Australian String Quartet (ASQ) plays four matched instruments: a violoncello (c.1743), and a violin (1748–49), both made in Piacenza, and a viola (1783) and another violin (1784) made in Turin.

== See also ==
- Enrico Marchetti
- Paolo Guadagnini

== Bibliography ==
- Cozio Archive Giovanni Batista Guadagnini.
- Grove, George, ed. (1900). "Guadagnini". A Dictionary of Music and Musicians. London: Macmillan and Company.
- Mnatzaganian, Sarah (2004). "G. B. Guadagnini". Aitchison Mnatzaganian. Archived from the original on 2 June 2008.
- Doring, Ernest N. (1949). The Guadagnini Family of Violin Makers. Chicago: Lewis & Sons.
- König, Adolf H., ed. (1981). Die Geigenbauer der Guadagnini-Familie: Die Turiner Schule [The violin makers of the Guadagnini family: The Turin School] (in German). Frankfurt: Verlag Das Musikinstrument. ISBN 978-3-92011-265-7.
- Fiori, G. (1994). "Documenti biografici di artisti e personaggi piacentini dal '600 all' '800 nell' Archivo Vescovile di Piacenza" [Biographical documents of Piacenza artists and characters from the 600s to the 1800s in the Archdiocese of Piacenza]. Strenna Piacentina (in Italian): 67–111.
- Kass, P.J. Violin Makers of the Piedmontese School.
- Vannes, Rene (1985) [1951]. Dictionnaire Universel del Luthiers (vol.3) (in French). Bruxelles: Les Amis de la musique. OCLC 53749830.
- Henley, William (1969). Universal Dictionary of Violin & Bow Makers. Brighton, England: Amati. ISBN 0-901424-00-5.
- Hamma, Walter (1993). Meister Italienischer Geigenbaukunst [Master of Italian violin making] (in German). Wilhelmshaven: F. Noetzel. ISBN 3-7959-0537-0.
- Rosengard, Duane (2000). Giovanni Battista Guadagnini: The Life and Achievement of a Master Maker of Violins. Haddonfield, New Jersey: Carteggio Media. ISBN 978-0-97042-290-3.
