= Modern Pentathlon Association Great Britain =

Modern Pentathlon Association Great Britain MPAGB
- IOC nation: Great Britain and Northern Ireland (GBR)
- Sport: modern pentathlon
- Official website: www.pentathlongb.org

HISTORY
- Year of formation: 1923

AFFILIATIONS
- International federation: Union Internationale de Pentathlon Moderne (UIPM)
- UIPM members page: www.uipmworld.org
- UIPM member since: 1948
- National Olympic Committee: British Olympic Committee

ELECTED
- President: Anthony Temple

SECRETARIAT
- Address: Wessex House 6.11; University of Bath; Claverton Down, Bath, BA2 7AY
- Country: United Kingdom
- Chief Executive: Jon Austin
- National Competitions & Events Manager: Sue Hyde
- Performance Director: Jan Bártů
- Women's Head Coach: Istvan Nemeth

FINANCE
- Company status: Association

REGIONS
- North; North West; Yorkshire; West Midlands; East Midlands; East; South West; South; South East

The Modern Pentathlon Association Great Britain is the national governing body for the sport of modern pentathlon in Great Britain, recognised by the Union Internationale de Pentathlon Moderne. Modern Pentathlon, the sport Baron Pierre de Coubertin called ‘the veritable consecration of the complete athlete’ comprises five events: fencing, swimming, riding, shooting and running. Today's competition involves fencing épée for a single hit against each of the other competitors; swimming 200 metres freestyle; riding an unknown horse round a show-jumping course, and then running four 800 metre laps each preceded by shooting at five targets with a laser pistol. First appearing in the Olympic Games of 1912 at the specific request of de Coubertin, founder of the Modern Olympic Games, the same five sports have comprised this greatest of all Olympic challenges and the sport completed one hundred years of unbroken Olympic participation in 2012. Despite technological changes the five events have remained essentially the same. In Stockholm in 1912, competitors brought their own horses, fenced outdoors without electric equipment, used military pistols and swam and ran outdoors. The Stockholm event took six days to complete while the super-athletes of today finish in a single day; in 1912 only men competed while today women share equal billing; the 1912 competitors were nearly all military men while today civilians generally dominate the sport.

== Competitions ==
There have been British Championships for men since 1924 and for women since 1977. There are also age group competitions at every level with World Championships held for Under 22, Under 18 and Under 16 competitors.

== History ==
Great Britain is unique in being the only country in the world to have been represented in the Modern Pentathlon at every single Olympic Games since 1912. Initially, the British Olympic Association (BOA) oversaw the British administration but, late in 1923, the MPAGB was founded at a meeting at the BOA offices in Picadilly and the first British Championships were held in 1924. Although university and police groups were also invited to attend meetings from the outset, the sport was organized entirely by military officials until late in the 1960s. In the 1970s, as the sport became increasingly a civilian activity, paid officials became part of the organization. In 1998, Jan Bartu, Olympic silver and bronze medallist, was appointed Performance Director. Jan and his team were able to benefit from the UK Lottery Fund supporting the squad. This important increase in revenue resulted in the MPAGB becoming a limited company in 2003 and re-branding itself Pentathlon GB, although it remains the MPAGB for many administrative matters. In 1948, at the London Olympic Games, the UIPM (Union Internationale de Pentathlon Moderne) was founded at Sandhurst Military Academy. Until that time, the Modern Pentathlon Olympic event had been organized by members of the constituent sports who sometimes did not fully understand the specific demands of combining five sports together in a single competition. Thus, Modern Pentathlon formed its own organization which continues to oversee developments in over 90 participating countries.

== Famous Pentathletes ==
At the Olympic Games, Great Britain has won two gold medals: in 1976, the team of Adrian Parker, Danny Nightingale and Jim Fox won the team gold and in the inaugural Women's event in 2000, Steph Cook took the gold medal. In 1988 the Men's Team of Graham Brookhouse, Richard Phelps and Dominic Mahony won the bronze medal. Great Britain's women have achieved the remarkable feat of winning medals at every Olympic Games since women were admitted in 2000. They were: 2000 Steph Cook (gold), Kate Allenby (bronze); 2004 Georgina Harland (bronze); 2008 Heather Fell (silver); 2012 Samantha Murray (silver). Great Britain has had six individual World Champions: 1982 Wendy Norman; 1993 Richard Phelps; 2001 Steph Cook; 2012 Mhairi Spence; 2014 Samantha Murray; and 2018 Jamie Cooke. In addition, there have been numerous team successes, the most notable being in 1982 when the British team of Wendy Norman, Sarah Parker and Kathy Tayler came 1st, 2nd and 3rd individually.
