= Bartu Elci-Ozsoy =

Classical musician working in France

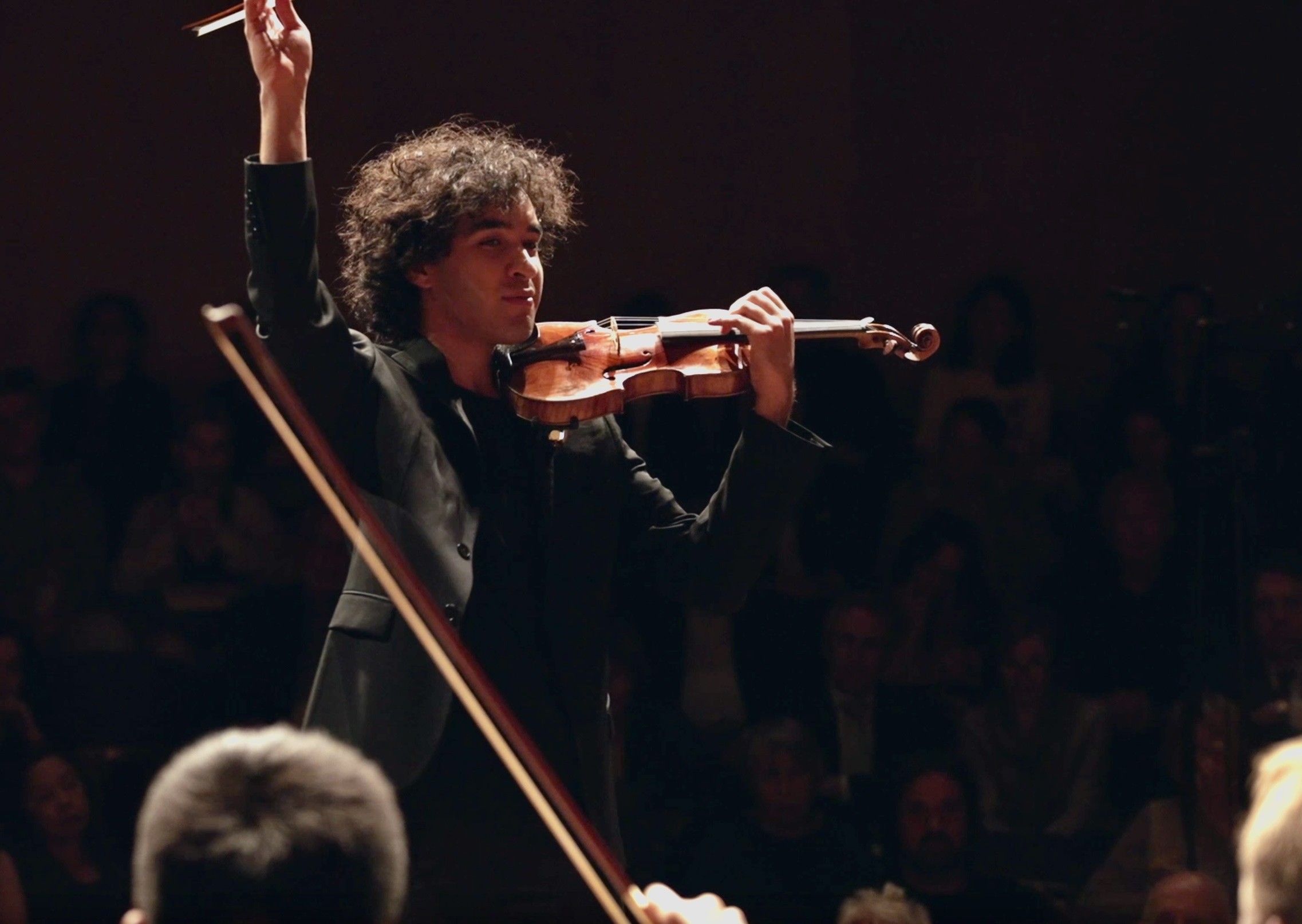

Background information
- Born: August 31, 2003 (age 23)
- Occupations: Violinist, conductor, composer
- Instrument: Violin 1760 J.B. Guadagnini (ex-Vidas)
- Years active: 2014-present
- Website: www.bartu.fr

Bartu Elci-Ozsoy (born August 31, 2003) is a French-Turkish violinist, conductor, and composer. He made his triple debut in Paris at the age of 15 by conducting his 1st Symphony and playing the Violin Concerto of Mendelssohn on 26 May 2019 with the Orchestre Sinfonietta at the Théâtre des Variétés. He also conducted the 29th Symphony of Mozart at the same concert. He is also a European Climate Pact Ambassador for the European Commission and a "Personnalité Amie du Comité UNICEF Île-de-France".

== Early life and education ==
Elci-Ozsoy started to play the violin at the age of 4, composing at 5 and conducting at 14. Piano pieces composed by Elci-Ozsoy when he was five were presented to the American President in 2010 at the Presidential Summit on Entrepreneurship.

At ten, Elci-Ozsoy gave his first concert with an orchestra. He was invited by the French government when he was 11 to study classical music in France and moved to Paris.

He earned a diploma in orchestral conducting from the École Normale de Musique de Paris at 17 and a bachelor's degree in violin from the Paris Conservatoire where he studied with Alexis Galpérine. Elci-Ozsoy is also a graduate of the American Conservatory in Fontainebleau. At the age of 20, he received his master's degree with distinction from the class of Sarah Nemtanu, concertmaster of the Orchestre National de France. The same year, he also completed his four-year studies in conducting from the "perfectionnement" class of Julien Masmondet. His Master's thesis at the Paris Conservatoire focused on raising awareness of environmental sustainability through collaboration between classical music and other forms of art. The Conservatoire loaned him the 1760 Giovanni Battista Guadagnini which belonged to Romanian-born violinist Raoul Georges Vidas (1901–1978). As a tribute to its owner, Elci-Ozsoy called it "ex-Vidas" Guadagnini and said "As I embark on this new chapter with the 'ex-Vidas' Guadagnini, I am reminded of the power of music to connect, inspire and transcend. It is an honor to be a part of this story, to contribute to the legacy of this magnificent instrument, and to share it with audiences around the world."

In 2024, he was selected by Académie Jaroussky to study with Nemanja Radulović and perform at the La Seine Musicale.

== Career ==
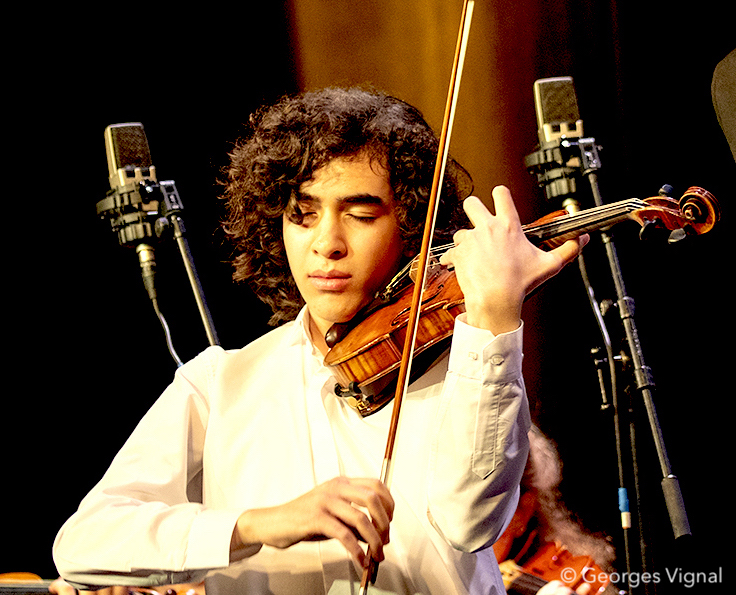
Bartu Elçi-Özsoy playing Mendelssohn's Violin Concerto at the premiere of his 1st Symphony at Theatre des Variétés in Paris, France on May 26th, 2019

At the age of 14, Elci-Ozsoy wrote his first symphony. The "avant-première" of the first symphony took place on 17 May 2019 in Le Mans, conducted by the composer.

Elci-Ozsoy appeared as a conductor, violinist, and composer and premiered his Symphony No.1 on 26 May 2019 at the same concert in Théâtre des Variétés. He donated the profit of the concert for the restoration of Notre-Dame Cathedral after the fire. At this concert, he also conducted Mozart's Symphony No. 29 with the Sinfonietta de Paris Symphony Orchestra and played Mendelssohn's Violin Concerto conducted by Dominique Fanal. The concert was also attended by the former Prime Minister of France Bernard Cazeneuve. After the concert, Jean-Claude Casadesus began to teach and mentor Elci-Ozsoy.

Elci-Ozsoy played at several concerts and conducted the youth orchestra Petites Mains Symphoniques in August 2019, at the 5th Festival des Étoiles Symphoniques.

In 2021, Elci-Ozsoy performed at the Centenary Festival of the American Fontainebleau Schools of Art and played at several concerts including one with Martha Argerich.

Elci-Ozsoy was invited as a guest conductor and soloist at the 18th Festival de Musique in Rochefort in May 2022. Elci-Ozsoy's performance of Ravel's Tzigane was featured at the Young Artists Showcase of the WQXR hosted by Midge Woolsey on 15 February 2023 dedicated to the Fontainebleau Conservatory's 2021 Centennial Celebration.

In 2023, he was commissioned to compose and play for a theatrical show with the actor Emmanuel Houzé for the inauguration of Musée Bourdelle and invited to play at the events organized by Laurence Cohen to pay tribute to Sarah Bernhardt for the centenary of her death. His recent notable performances included concerts at the Festival Les Arcs, a gala concert for the Triomphe de l'Art competition at the Musical Instrument Museum, Brussels, where he won the Grand Prix, a concert at the Ministry of Europe and Foreign Affairs by the French National Commission for UNESCO in tribute to Sarah Bernhardt; two chamber music concerts in Rome at the Theatre of Marcellus; concerts in Paris with the Ellipsos saxophone quartet and with the composer Kryštof Mařatka; chamber music concerts in Vienna.

He made his US debut in November 2023 with several concerts and events in New York, Chicago and Washington, which also included a performance at the UN headquarters sponsored by the Permanent Mission of France to the United Nations and a concert organized by the American Art Schools in Fontainebleau.

In September 2024, he was invited to perform at the 80th Anniversary of the Le Monde in Paris where he also premiered his compositions.

== Social work ==
Elci-Ozsoy implemented solidarity projects with the outbreak of COVID-19 in collaboration with other artists.

In August 2020, Elci-Ozsoy led a project in which he composed and performed a piece for six violins on four themes (The River, Rainforest, Destruction, and Regrowth) to raise awareness of the challenges facing the Amazon Rainforest in collaboration with Emil Lidé, a Swedish LEGO artist. Elci-Ozsoy then became an Artist for the Amazon of the Amazon Aid Foundation.

In April 2023, he collaborated with the Jeunes Talents Association in Paris to organize a benefit concert to raise and donate funds to UNICEF for helping children affected from the earthquakes in Turkey and Syria. The concert was organized under the patronage of the French president, Emmanuel Macron. An interview and performance by Elci-Ozsoy after the concert were featured on the award-winning 'Soul Music,' produced by Maggie Ayre on BBC Radio 4, on November 11, 2023.

Combining his two missions with the European Climate Pact and UNICEF, he gave benefit concerts and participated in other community engagement events in Suriname under the patronage of the French Ambassador of Suriname and Guyana in April 2024. All proceeds of the concert were donated to UNICEF to support their response to children in Suriname's interior impacted by the consequences of climate change.
