= Paolo Guadagnini =

Italian violin maker

Paolo Guadagnini (1908–1942) was an Italian violin maker, the last member of the famous Guadagnini family of luthiers, who worked in Turin. He died as a soldier in the Second World War.
