= List of programmes broadcast by Discovery Kids (India) =

Warner Bros Discovery

This is a list of television programs currently and formerly broadcast by Discovery Kids in India. The channel was launched on 7 August 2012.

== Current programming ==
- Bunty Billa Aur Babban
- Fukrey Boyzzz
- Haddi Mera Buddy
- Kisna
- Little Krishna
- Larva
- Mr. Bean
- Mr. Bean: The Animated Series
- Roll No 21
- Shaun the Sheep
- Smaashhing Simmba
- We Bare Bears

== Former programming ==
- 1001 Nights
- Adiboo Adventures
- Adventure 8: Zoo Games
- The Adventures of Chuck and Friends
- The Adventures of Tintin
- Akbar and Birbal
- The Amazing Spiez!
- Angry Birds Blues
- Angry Birds Stella
- Angry Birds Toons
- Animal Atlas
- Art Ninja
- Bablu Dablu
- Bandbudh Aur Budbak
- Batwheels
- Bindi the Jungle Girl
- Bump
- Bunty Billa Aur Babban
- Care Bears
- Chaplin & Co
- Chimpui
- Classmate Spell Bee
- Clifford the Big Red Dog
- Dex Hamilton: Alien Entomologist
- Dick 'N' Dom Go Wild
- Dino Dan
- Dinofroz
- Discovery School Super League
- Doki
- Finding Stuff Out
- G.I. Joe: Renegades
- Gadget Boy
- Howzzattt
- Kim
- Insectibles
- Legend of Enyo
- Little Singham
- Luv Kushh
- Maya the Bee
- Mister Maker
- Molly of Denali
- The Monster Kid
- The Mysteries of Alfred Hedgehog
- Mystery Hunters India
- Nature Cat
- The New Woody Woodpecker Show
- Nils Holgersson
- Oscar's Oasis
- Pac-Man and the Ghostly Adventures
- Papyrus
- Piggy Tales
- Pinkalicious & Peterrific
- Robin Hood: Mischief in Sherwood
- Sally Bollywood
- Shaktimaan: The Animated Series
- Sheik
- Sheikh Chilli and Friendz
- Sunny Bunnies
- Tenali Raman
- Tiny Toon Adventures
- The Tom and Jerry Show (2014)
- Tom and Jerry Tales
- Transformers: Animated
- Transformers: Armada
- Transformers: Cybertron
- Transformers: Cyberverse
- Transformers: Energon
- Transformers: Prime
- Transformers: Rescue Bots
- Wild Kratts
- Wild Tales
- The Woody Woodpecker Show
- Zak Storm
