= Karel Bártů =

Czech modern pentathlete (1916–2008)

Personal information
- Born: 22 September 1916 Třeboň, Austria-Hungary
- Died: 25 July 2008 (aged 91)

Sport
- Sport: Modern pentathlon

Karel Bártů (22 September 1916 – 25 July 2008) was a Czech modern pentathlete who competed in the 1948 Summer Olympics. After retiring from competition he became a coach, training the Czechoslovak modern pentathlon team, including his son Jan Bártů.
