= Larva (TV series) =

South Korean animated television series

- Also known as: Larvae
- Genre: Comedy; Slapstick
- Created by: TUBAⁿ
- Directed by: Joo-gong Maeng
- Voices of: Bum-ki Hong
- Composer: Great Park
- Country of origin: South Korea
- Original languages: None (seasons 1–3; 5–6); English (season 4)
- No. of seasons: 6
- No. of episodes: 332

Production
- Executive producers: Sungjai Ahn; Eugene Kang
- Producers: Ki-tae Kim; Ji-na Kim; Sang-koo Lee; Sean Song; Alex Sung; Catherine Yoon
- Editors: Byuong-wook Ahn; Yoon-hee Jong
- Running time: 2–3 minutes (seasons 1–3; 6); 7 minutes (seasons 4–5)
- Production company: TUBAⁿ

Original release
- Network: KBS 1TV (season 1); KBS 2TV (season 2); JEI TV (season 3); Netflix (seasons 4–6); SBS TV (season 6)
- Release: 26 March 2011 – present

Larva (Korean: 라바) is a South Korean 3D computer-animated comedy television series produced by TUBA Entertainment in Seoul. Its main characters are two larvae that never speak, although they do make expressive sounds. The cartoon exists in their small world where miniature adventures occur.

== Characters ==
=== Main ===
- Red – A hot-tempered, selfish and greedy red-colored caterpillar with orange stripes on his abdomen. Red has tried to steal Yellow's love interest, Pink, but he always ends up alone. He shrieks, shouts and screams when in anger, fear, frustration and in a horrible panic. He is always showing off and abusing Yellow, but he often ends up hurting himself instead.
- Yellow - A dimwitted and happy-go-lucky yellow-colored caterpillar with one antenna, pink blushed cheeks, and also has orange stripes on his abdomen. He has a contentious friendship with Red. Although he usually obeys Red, he loses his mind in front of food. He changes color from yellow to brown and he grows dark green shades around his mouth when feeling extreme emotions.

=== Recurring ===
- Violet – An oversized light purple ghost slug. He has an exposed inner body and roar, showing his sharp teeth.
- Brown – A brown and red dung beetle that gathers dung. To him, dung is a treasure, though it makes his breath stink. He hates it when other insects touch his dungball. He has a long strand of hair on his right cheek.
- Black – A horned atlas beetle that has great strength and is usually punching a cocoon (which he uses as punching bag). He's aggressive and will beat up whoever he thinks is messing with him. In the episode "Black's Back" he turns out to be a slug wearing beetle armor.
- Rainbow – A dark tan snail with a red and green shell. When in his shell, he moves slowly, but under that, he has a muscular human-like body and can function as humans do.
- Pink – A pink caterpillar with two antennae. She loves Yellow and Yellow loves her as well, but her presence often causes conflict between him and Red, who has a one-sided crush on her.
- Ivory - A stick bug with brown skin, Ivory has a very thin body with brown skin color. He has black eyes and darker colored areas by his eyelids. He is often seen flying from a gust of wind due to his light weight. He has 2 antennae and little pink studs on. His girlfriend is Cocoa.

=== Minor ===
- Blue – A housefly that has numerous smells. Nobody can get close to him because of his repugnant smell. He often feels gloomy and lonely because nobody can approach him.
- Mosquito – A Mosquito who likes the taste of blood. He uses his fangs to take all of the blood from other characters. He is often hungry, but also lonely due to his hunger.
- Pink's doppelgänger — a pink Caterpillar that only appeared at the end of “love love love 2”. She looks exactly like pink except she has hot pink stripes on her abdomen and has blonde hair and a mole. Yellow mistook her for the real pink in the episode she appeared in.
- Navy – A deep-sea fish appears when the sewerage is sunk. He appeared as a goldfish. When Red and Yellow threw him into a sardine can full of warm water, he changed into a deep-sea fish which is often seen whenever the sewer floods. He has a good enough appetite to eat up the caterpillars and other insects.
- Venus flytrap – A venus flytrap who eats up anything on the ground. In season 1, he is an enemy to all insects because he tries to swallow the other insects when he encounters them. But he is weaker than Violet. He appears to have a menacing set of teeth.
- Green (also known as Frog) – A green frog which often appears in the sewer, is sensitive, and tries to monopolize all power by eating insects and larvae. He is several times bigger than other normal frogs. He escaped from the sewer and went into the house where Red and Yellow lived in season 2. In season 3, he lives on the streets along with Grey & the Silvers.
- Bee – A honey bee who collects honey. She stings when someone touches the honey that she collected or makes her angry.
- Maroon – A brown and cream dachshund who wears a blue and yellow sweater who only appeared in season 2. He attacks when he sees moving things. He buries his valued bones in the ground and is quite temperamental. In the episode "Whistle", he does certain things when he hears yellow's certain whistling.
- Prussian – A hyacinth macaw which only appeared in season 2. He observes other friends and gives a sardonic laugh before attacking. He is also a predator to the caterpillars. The episode "Nanta" revealed that he used to live in the Amazon rainforest as a hatchling.
- Prism – A chameleon which appears intermittently in various areas of season 2, such as the living room, bathroom, rooftop, and even bedroom; he suddenly appears and attacks Red and Yellow without reason.
- Ephemera – A mayfly who appears in the titular episode. Red has a crush on her, but she dies quickly due to the lifespan of an average mayfly.
- Bomber bug – A bombardier beetle which bombed Yellow, Red, and Brown in the episode "Bomb Bug" in Season 2. He has the ability to bomb a place with acid which comes out from his bottom. He usually does that when he's angry, sad, or feeling disgusted.
- Grey – A hideous gray-colored rat that appears in season 3 and 5. He is an enemy to all larvae and other insects.
- Silvers – A pigeon duo using food scraps (a banana peel and a carved-out half watermelon) to protect their super reflective heads from the sun, they are enemies of the larvae. Each pigeon communicates with one word, "Yah" for the pigeon wearing the banana peel, and "Huh" for the pigeon wearing the carved out watermelon. These pigeons appear in Seasons 3, 4 and 5.
- Cocoa - A brown cricket. She is Ivory's girlfriend.
- Mite - A baby light-green mite who Yellow initially adopts, but turns out to parasitically prey on Yellow and the others. Then Yellow leaves it in a zoo.
- Mudskippers - A pair of fish. They live underground under the sands and can slap each other with their fins.
- Booby - A Blue-footed booby bird. He met the larvae when they landed on his island.
- Mango - An orange-yellow caterpillar Red has fallen in love with. When she first meets Red, she couples with him. When Red and Yellow escaped the island, she knew she had to leave her home to find her boyfriend.
- Chuck (voiced by Eddy Lee) - A human. He is the first character who can speak properly, although previously other characters occasionally spoke on occasion if it fits the scene.
- Clara - A seal that Red and Yellow befriended. She is playful and charming and has the same name as Chuck's girlfriend.
- Whale - A whale who appears in season 4.
- Crabsformer - A crab who accidentally ate an alien spaceship that turned him into a robotic crab. He has a crush on a lady crab; however, she and the other crabs are scared of his powers. This character appears in season 4 and 5.
- Malt - A dark grey tabby cat & the assistant of the bald bug capturing scientist who plans to use the captured bugs for his invention that uses bugs to create a hair-growth solution to restore his hair. He first debuts in Larva Pendant.
- Magenta - A young magenta caterpillar who was born in season 5 from Yellow who accidentally ate a pink egg, She would find care with Yellow and Red, who grew to care for the newborn. Eventually, she would metamorphose into a wasp.
- Big Brown - A easygoing pig-nosed turtle who is often seen meditating. He appears in season 5. He rarely gets upset and is a very good sensei, but he will stand up for his friends, should the need arise.
- Grizzly - A moth, that is as sneaky as he is greedy, can be invisible, and blind others with his smoke should his cover be blown. Despite this greed, he can protect others should push come to shove, and he has fallen in love with one of the bees that work in the hive. He appears in season 5.
- Mauve - An owl who is very protective of her little one, Tan. She may be fierce should anyone hurt her little one, but she means well, and while they got off on a rocky start she starts to think of Yellow, Red, and Magenta as friends. She would appear in season 5.
- Tan - Mauve's hatchling who became friends with Magenta, and like her, he would grow as well. He would appear in season 5.
- Parch - A robot who owns the convenience store in Mars. Parch hired Red and Yellow as employees, who usually cause mayhem at the store. Parch secretly works for an evil scientist who created the store in an attempt to collect gems and use them to take over the world. Parch appears in season 6.
- Bethes - A pink alien from Mars who is seemingly optimistic and joyful. Bethes was originally hired by Parch to work at the convenience store but Red and Yellow tricked him into taking a u-turn, therefore giving them the jobs instead. Bethes works as a music therapist for ill people, a job he generally dislikes, forcing him to take art therapy. He appears in season 6.

== Production ==
Larva was launched by TUBA Entertainment in 2011, with adult viewers in mind. The producers aimed to create a cartoon that could appeal to an audience of a wide age scale. It debuted on the national channel, KBS and on cable television with short, 90-second episodes. The series quickly became popular, and as of September 2015 was sold to more than 40 countries, including Canal Plus in France, as well as merchandising contracts taking place in Taiwan, Germany, Turkey and Chile, among others. The creators earned 1 million won in royalties in the first three months of launching related merchandise, including toys and stationery products. In 2018, Netflix acquired rights to the franchise and announced they would continue the series with Larva Island. In February 2019, it was announced that Larva Island was renewed for a second and final season. In 2023, it was announced that TUBAn and Astro-Nomical are set to produce a feature-length Larva film with a script written by Erica Rivinoja.

== Episode list ==
=== Series overview ===
Series	Episodes	Title	Originally released		
Series	Episodes	Title	First released	Last released	Network
1	104	-	26 March 2011	24 September 2011	KBS 1TV
2	52	-	5 January 2013	21 September 2013	KBS 2TV
3	104	Larva in New York	17 October 2014	7 September 2015	JEI TV
4	26	Larva Island	19 October 2018	1 March 2019	Netflix
The Larva Island Movie			23 July 2020		Netflix
Larva Pendant			25 May 2022		Netflix
5	26	Larva Family	4 May 2023		Netflix
6	78	Larva in Mars	13 January 2024	10 February 2024	SBS TV

=== Season 1: Grate/Sewers (2011) ===
No.	Original air date	Title	Storyboarded by
1	26 March 2011	Ice Cream	Joo-gong, Maeng
2	26 March 2011	Mosquito	Joo-gong, Maeng
3	26 March 2011	Dancing in the Rain	Joo-gong, Maeng
4	26 March 2011	Mushroom	Tea-sik, Shin
5	2 April 2011	Gum 1	Joo-gong, Maeng
6	2 April 2011	Ice Road	Joo-gong, Maeng
7	2 April 2011	Straw	Byoung-wook, Ahn
8	2 April 2011	Insectivorous Plant	Byoung-wook, Ahn
9	9 April 2011	Snail	Joo-gong, Maeng
10	9 April 2011	Snoring	Byoung-wook, Ahn
11	9 April 2011	Popcorn	Byoung-wook, Ahn
12	9 April 2011	Aquarium	Byoung-wook, Ahn; Dea-bum, Kim
13	23 April 2011	Ham	Joo-gong, Maeng
14	23 April 2011	Psychic	Byoung-wook, Ahn
15	23 April 2011	Fly	Byoung-wook, Ahn
16	23 April 2011	Spaghetti	Dea-bum, Kim
17	30 April 2011	Airform	Byoung-wook, Ahn
18	30 April 2011	Cocoon 1	Byoung-wook, Ahn
19	30 April 2011	Cocoon 2	Byoung-wook, Ahn
20	30 April 2011	Puding	Dea-bum, Kim
21	7 May 2011	Watermelon	Dea-bum, Kim
22	7 May 2011	UFO	Dea-bum, Kim
23	7 May 2011	Fishing	Dea-bum, Kim
24	7 May 2011	Out of Body	Dea-bum, Kim
25	14 May 2011	Hot Spring	Dea-bum, Kim
26	14 May 2011	Hide and Seek	Byoung-wook, Ahn
27	14 May 2011	Earthquake	Byoung-wook, Ahn
28	14 May 2011	Hair-growth Solution	Dea-bum, Kim
29	21 May 2011	Flood 1	Byoung-wook, Ahn
30	21 May 2011	Swamp	Dea-bum, Kim
31	21 May 2011	Walnut	Dea-bum, Kim
32	21 May 2011	Soda	Dea-bum, Kim
33	28 May 2011	Frog	Dea-bum, Kim; Byoung-wook, Ahn
34	28 May 2011	Typhoon 1	Byoung-wook, Ahn
35	28 May 2011	Cavity	Dea-bum, Kim
36	28 May 2011	Cointoss	Byoung-wook, Ahn
37	4 June 2011	Concert	Byoung-wook, Ahn; Dea-bum, Kim
38	4 June 2011	Snowball Fight	Byoung-wook, Ahn
39	4 June 2011	Flood 2	Byoung-wook, Ahn
40	4 June 2011	Ant	Dea-bum, Kim
41	11 June 2011	Stomachache	Dea-bum, Kim
42	11 June 2011	Mummy	Byoung-wook, Ahn
43	11 June 2011	Bee 1	Byoung-wook, Ahn
44	11 June 2011	Balloon	Byoung-wook, Ahn
45	18 June 2011	Love	Dea-bum, Kim
46	18 June 2011	Spring	Byoung-wook, Ahn
47	18 June 2011	Christmas	Dea-bum, Kim
48	18 June 2011	Yellow-terminator	Joo-gong, Maeng
49	25 June 2011	The Cement	Dea-bum, Kim
50	25 June 2011	Larvatar 1	Byoung-wook, Ahn
51	25 June 2011	Hip Hop	Dea-bum, Kim; Byoung-wook, Ahn
52	25 June 2011	Snot	Joo-gong, Maeng
53	2 July 2011	Hailing	Min-seong, Kang
54	2 July 2011	Pit	Byoung-wook, Ahn
55	2 July 2011	Gum2	Byoung-wook, Ahn
56	2 July 2011	Raining	Byoung-wook, Ahn
57	9 July 2011	Glove	Byoung-wook, Ahn
58	9 July 2011	Laughing	Byoung-wook, Ahn
59	9 July 2011	Eye Infection	Dea-bum, Kim
60	9 July 2011	Missing	Dea-bum, Kim
61	16 July 2011	Wig	Dea-bum, Kim
62	16 July 2011	Vampire	Dea-bum, Kim
63	16 July 2011	Clock	Min-seong, Kang
64	16 July 2011	Staring Contest	Byoung-wook, Ahn
65	23 July 2011	Perfume	Min-seong, Kang
66	23 July 2011	Super Glue	Dea-bum, Kim
67	23 July 2011	Swing	Dea-bum, Kim
68	23 July 2011	Growing a Plant	Dea-bum, Kim
69	30 July 2011	Bee 2	Byoung-wook, Ahn
70	30 July 2011	Scary Night	Byoung-wook, Ahn
71	30 July 2011	Rope	Dea-bum, Kim
72	30 July 2011	Spider	Min-seong, Kang
73	6 August 2011	Super Liquid	Dea-bum, Kim
74	6 August 2011	Nightmare	Joo-gong, Maeng
75	6 August 2011	Chick 1	Byoung-wook, Ahn
76	6 August 2011	Chick 2	Byoung-wook, Ahn
77	13 August 2011	Farting	Min-seong, Kang
78	13 August 2011	Secret of Snail	Byoung-wook, Ahn; Dea-bum, Kim; Min-seong, Kang
79	13 August 2011	Hand	Dea-bum, Kim
80	13 August 2011	Bottle	Dea-bum, Kim; Byoung-wook, Ahn
81	20 August 2011	Moonlight Waltz	Byoung-wook, Ahn
82	20 August 2011	Hair-growth Solution 2	Dea-bum, Kim
83	20 August 2011	Mantis	Min-seong, Kang
84	20 August 2011	Typhoon 2	Byoung-wook, Ahn
85	27 August 2011	Chili Show	Dea-bum, Kim
86	27 August 2011	Alien	Min-seong, Kahn
87	27 August 2011	Grape	Dea-bum, Kim
88	27 August 2011	Quick Sand	Min-seong, Kang
89	3 September 2011	Larvatar 2	Min-seong, Kang
90	3 September 2011	Toy Car	Dea-bum, Kim
91	3 September 2011	Love Love Love 1	Byoung-wook, Ahn
92	3 September 2011	Love Love Love 2	Byoung-wook, Ahn
93	10 September 2011	Swan Lake	Byoung-wook, Ahn
94	10 September 2011	Electronic Shock	Dea-bum, Kim
95	10 September 2011	Whistle	Min-seong, Kang
96	10 September 2011	Diving	Byoung-wook, Ahn
97	17 September 2011	Fire	Min-seong, Kang
98	17 September 2011	Balance	Dea-bum, Kim
99	17 September 2011	Water Show	Min-seong, Kang
100	17 September 2011	Flying Yellow	Byoung-wook, Ahn
101	24 September 2011	Short Arm Octopus	Dea-bum, Kim
102	24 September 2011	Wild Wild World 1	Joo-gong, Maeng
103	24 September 2011	Wild Wild World 2	Joo-gong, Maeng
104	24 September 2011	Wild Wild World 3	Joo-gong, Maeng

=== Season 2: House (2013) ===
No.	Original air date	Title	Storyboarded by
1	5 January 2013	Welcome Larva!	Min-Seong Kang
2	5 January 2013	Soap Bubbles	Min-Seong Kang
3	12 January 2013	Robot	Hun-Min Jang
4	12 January 2013	Brown's Back!	Seung-Ik Ahn
5	19 January 2013	Stop, Freeze!	Woo Seong-Jung
6	19 January 2013	Upstanding	Byoung-Wook Ahn
7	26 January 2013	Ski Jump	Min-Seong Kang
8	26 January 2013	Black's back	Min-Seong Kang
9	2 February 2013	Man Date	Min-Seong Kang
10	2 February 2013	Tomato	Byoung-Wook Ahn
11	9 February 2013	Make-up	Seung-Ik Ahn
12	9 February 2013	Gum	Byoung-Wook Ahn
13	16 February 2013	Sneeze	Min-U Kim and Byoung-Wook Ahn
14	15 June 2013	Magic Jar	Min-Seong Kang
15	23 February 2013	Roulette	Byoung-Wook Ahn
16	23 February 2013	Ping-Pong	Byoung-Wook Ahn
17	9 March 2013	Spider-Larva	Min-Seong Kang
18	9 March 2013	Bug Bomb	Min-Seong Kang
19	16 March 2013	Hello Pink!	Byoung-Wook Ahn
20	16 March 2013	Spinner	Byoung-Wook Ahn
21	23 March 2013	Speaker Dance	Byoung-Wook Ahn
22	23 March 2013	Limbs	Byoung-Wook Ahn
23	30 March 2013	Bath	Byoung-Wook Ahn
24	30 March 2013	Genius Yellow	Min-Seong Kang
25	6 April 2013	Hi Violet!	Hun-Min Jang
26	6 April 2013	Diet	Byoung-Wook Ahn
27	11 May 2013	Fan	Hun-Min Jang
28	20 April 2013	Sweat	Min-Seong Kang
29	18 May 2013	Nightmare	Ji-Yeon Kim
30	1 June 2013	Toilet	Hun-Min Jang and Byoung-Wook Ahn
31	25 May 2013	Yellow Chicken	Joo-Jae Beom
32	8 June 2013	Fortune Cookie	Seung-ik Ahn
33-34	22 June 2013	Mayfly 1–2	Min-Seong Kang
35	20 July 2013	Ice	Kang-Heon Ahn
36	29 June 2013	Lar-vengers	Hun-Min Jang
37	27 July 2013	Once Upon a Time	Min-Seong Kang
38	13 July 2013	Opera	Byoung-Wook Ahn
39	6 July 2013	Hide & Seek	Joo-Gong Meang
40	10 August 2013	Larva Car	Byoung-Wook Ahn
41	14 September 2013	Wild Red	Min-Seong Kang, and Ji-Yeon Kim
42	31 August 2013	Beanstalks	Min-Seong Kang, and Byoung-Wook Ahn
43	20 April 2013	Whistle	Min-U Kim
44	17 August 2013	Golden Brown	Min-Seong Kang
45	7 September 2013	Frog	Byoung-Wook Ahn
46	24 August 2013	Flower Farts	Byoung-Wook Ahn
47	20 July 2013	Cocoon	Min-seong Kang and Byoung-wook Ahn
48	11 May 2013	Nanta	Joo-Gong Meang
49	16 February 2013	Strange Berries	Byoung-Wook Ahn
50	14 September 2013	Wild Wild Wild World 1	Joo-Gong Meang
51	21 September 2013	Wild Wild Wild World 2	Joo-Gong Meang
52	21 September 2013	Wild Wild Wild World 3	Joo-Gong Meang

=== Season 3: Larva in New York (2014–15) ===
No. In Season	No. Overall	Original air date	Title	Storyboarded by
1	157	17 October 2014	Donut	Jee-hyun Kim
2	158	17 October 2014	Flare	Byoung-wook Ahn
3	159	24 October 2014	Box	Byoung-wook Ahn
4	160	24 October 2014	Typhoon	Tae-wook Koh
5	161	31 October 2014	Fireplug	Byoung-wook Ahn
6	162	31 October 2014	Lemon	Jee-hyun Kim
7	163	7 November 2014	Gum Fart	Min-seong Kang
8	164	7 November 2014	Shade	Ji-yeon Kim
9	165	14 November 2014	Ice	Jee-hyun Kim
10	166	14 November 2014	Stream	Mi-seon An and Min-seong Kang
11	167	21 November 2014	Basketball	Tae-wook Koh
12	168	21 November 2014	Tickle	Ji-yeon Kim
13	169	28 November 2014	Hiccup	Byoung-wook Ahn and Min-seong Kang
14	170	28 November 2014	Mouse	Byoung-wook Ahn and Min-seong Kang
15	171	5 December 2014	Garlic 1	Mi-seon An
16	172	5 December 2014	Garlic 2	Mi-seon An
17	173	12 December 2014	Wheel	Mi-seon An
18	174	12 December 2014	Magnet	Seung-hun Kim
19	175	19 December 2014	Stick Insect	Seung-hun Kim
20	176	19 December 2014	Oil	Seung-hun Kim
21	177	26 December 2014	Double Eyelids 1	Tae-wook Koh
22	178	26 December 2014	Double Eyelids 2	Tae-wook Koh
23	179	2 January 2015	Thunder Red	Ji-yeon Kim
24	180	2 January 2015	Cement	Jee-hyun Kim
25	181	9 January 2015	The Chaser	Ji-yeon Kim
26	182	9 January 2015	Wrap	Ye-ri Kim
27	183	16 January 2015	The Silver	Mi-seon An
28	184	16 January 2015	Ark	Ji-yeon Kim and Jee-hyun Kim
29	185	23 January 2015	Mite	Tae-wook Koh
30	186	23 January 2015	Cancan	Tae-wook Koh
31	187	29 January 2015	Pink's Secret	Min-seong Kang
32	188	29 January 2015	Massage	Jee-hyun Kim
33	189	5 February 2015	Loyalty	Tae-wook Koh
34	190	5 February 2015	Kung Fu	Tae-wook Koh
35	191	12 February 2015	Pipe	Tae-wook Koh
36	192	12 February 2015	Tag	Ji-yeon Kim
37	193	19 February 2015	Cup Noodle	Min-seong Kang
38	194	19 February 2015	Untidy Sleeper	Seung-hun Kim
39	195	26 February 2015	Sushi	Jee-hyun Kim
40	196	26 February 2015	Breath	Jee-hyun Kim
41	197	5 March 2015	Tower Stack	Ji-yeon Kim
42	198	5 March 2015	Tough Guy	Jee-hyun Kim
43	199	12 March 2015	Showdown	Tae-wook Koh
44	200	12 March 2015	Dance Battle	Tae-wook Koh
45	201	19 March 2015	Booger	Jee-hyun Kim
46	202	19 March 2015	Detective 1	Tae-wook Koh
47	203	26 March 2015	Detective 2	Tae-wook Koh
48	204	26 March 2015	Yellow's Secret	Ye-ri Kim and Jee-hyun Kim
49	205	2 April 2015	Straw	Seung-hun Kim
50	206	2 April 2015	Confetti Poppers	Tae-wook Koh
51	207	9 April 2015	Rain	Jee-hyun Kim
52	208	9 April 2015	A Day in the Life of Larva	Mi-seon An
53	209	16 April 2015	Wiper	Bo-ri Lee and Min-seong Kang
54	210	16 April 2015	Street Larva	Tae-wook Koh
55	211	23 April 2015	Yellow's Revenge 1	Seung-hun Kim
56	212	23 April 2015	Yellow's Revenge 2	Seung-hun Kim
57	213	30 April 2015	Snowball Fight	Byoung-wook Ahn and Tae-wook Koh
58	214	30 April 2015	Life of a Rat	Min-seong Kang
59	215	7 May 2015	Fighter in the Wind	Seung-hun Kim
60	216	7 May 2015	Larva of the Rings	Jee-hyun Kim
61	217	14 May 2015	Flash Light	Jee-hyun Kim
62	218	14 May 2015	Glue	Mi-seon An
63-69	219-225	21 May 2015 (1–2), 28 May 2015 (3–4), 4 June 2015 (5–6), 11 June 2015 (7)	Larva Rangers (1–7)	Byoung-wook Ahn, Tae-wook Koh, and Seung-hun Kim
70	226	11 June 2015	Feelers	Seung-hun Kim
71	227	18 June 2015	Fashion Show	Mi-seon An and Jee-hyun Kim
72	228	18 June 2015	Red, a Budding Comedian	Mi-seon An
73–75	229-231	25 June 2015 (1–2), 2 July 2015 (3)	Insect Killer (1–3)	Ji-yeon Kim; Seung-hun Kim (Part 3 only)
76	232	2 July 2015	Glove	Mi-seon An
77	233	9 July 2015	Troublemaker	Tae-wook Koh
78	234	9 July 2015	Sea Battle	Jee-hyun Kim
79	235	16 July 2015	Rubber Ball	Ye-ri Kim and Jee-hyun Kim
80	236	16 July 2015	Dizziness	Mi-seon An and Jee-hyun Kim
81	237	23 July 2015	Pitapat 1	Jee-hyun Kim
82	238	23 July 2015	Pitapat 2	Jee-hyun Kim
83	239	30 July 2015	Marathon	Ji-yeon Kim
84	240	30 July 2015	Tea	Tae-wook Koh
85	241	6 August 2015	Flood	Min-seong Kang
86–89	242-245	6 August 2015 (1), 13 August 2015 (2–3), 20 August 2015 (4)	New Friend (1–4)	Jee-hyun Kim
90	246	20 August 2015	Umbrella	Beop-seo Koo and Seung-hun Kim
91	247	27 August 2015	Cheese	Min-seong Kang
92	248	27 August 2015	Distress 1	Jee-hyun Kim
93	249	3 August 2015	Distress 2	Jee-hyun Kim
94	250	3 August 2015	An Out-of-Body Experience	Seung-Hun Kim
95	251	10 August 2015	Minicar	Hyo-bin Kang and Jee-hyun Kim
96	252	10 August 2015	One-sided Love 1	Taek-woo Koh
97	253	17 August 2015	One-sided Love 2	Taek-woo Koh
98	254	17 August 2015	Roll a Dung!	Mi-seon An
99	255	24 August 2015	Larvarta	Seung-hun Kim
100	256	24 August 2015	Bobsleigh	Jee-hyun Kim, Seung-hun Kim, and Tae-wook Koh
101	257	31 August 2015	Christmas	Joo-gong Maeng and Min-seong Kang
102	258	31 August 2015	As Time Goes By	Seung-hun Kim
103	259	7 September 2015	Goodbye New York 1	Byoung-wook Ahn
104	260	7 September 2015	Goodbye New York 2	Byoung-wook Ahn

=== Season 4: Larva Island (2018–19) ===
No. in season	No. Overall	Original air date	Title	Storyboarded by
Part 1
1	261	19 October 2018	Mango	Kim Jee-hyun
2	262	19 October 2018	Mango 2	Kim Jee-hyun
3	263	19 October 2018	Larva Island	Ahn Byoung-wook / Kim Seung-hun; Lee Sang-seon
4	264	19 October 2018	Chuck	Kang Min-seong / Lee Sang-seon
5	265	19 October 2018	Clara	Kim Seung-hun
6	266	19 October 2018	Crabsformer	Kim Seung-hun / Kim Jee-hyun
7	267	19 October 2018	Fishing	Kim Jee-hyun / Kim Seung-hun
8	268	19 October 2018	Pendant	Kim Jee-hyun
9	269	19 October 2018	Lala Island	Kim Jee-hyun
10	270	19 October 2018	Master Chef	Koh Tae-wook
11	271	19 October 2018	Farming	Kim Seung-hun
12	272	19 October 2018	Pirate	Kim Seung-hun / Jeong Mi-rin; Kim Jee-hyun
13	273	19 October 2018	Change	Jeong Mi-rin / Koh Tae-wook
Part 2
14	274	1 March 2019	Maze	Kim Seung-hun
15	275	1 March 2019	Fire	Kim Seung-hun / Jeong Mi-rin; Koh Tae-wook / Lee Sang-seon
16	276	1 March 2019	Beach Volleyball	Kim Pil-sung
17-18	277-278	1 March 2019 (Both)	Larva Rangers (1&2)	Koh Tae-wook
19	279	1 March 2019	A Lucky Day	Kim Pil-sung, Koh Tae-wook
20	280	1 March 2019	Crabsformer 2	Koh Tae-wook, Jeong Mi-rin
21	281	1 March 2019	Booby's Love	Kim Pil-sung
22	282	1 March 2019	Mango's Parents	Koh Tae-wook
23	283	1 March 2019	Iceberg	Jerong Mi-rin / Koh Tae-wook; Kim Seung-hun
24	284	1 March 2019	Storm	Kim Pil-sung
25	285	1 March 2019	Escape	Kim Seung-hun
26	286	1 March 2019	Drift	Jeong Mi-rin

=== Season 5: Larva Family (2023) ===
No. in season	No. Overall	Original air date	Title	Storyboarded by
1	287	4 May 2023	The Baby	Lee Ji-Yeon
2	288	4 May 2023	Fart	Jo In-taek, Oh Yeong-jun
3	289	4 May 2023	Magneta	Sung yu-jin, Oh Yeong-jun
4	290	4 May 2023	Buddy	Sung yu-jin
5	291	4 May 2023	Wild Life	Yeo Sang-eun, Sung Yu-jin
6	292	4 May 2023	Royal Jelly	Hong Gi-suk
7	293	4 May 2023	Firefly	Jung Yun-ji / Lee Ji-Yeon; Sung Yu-jin / Oh Yeong-jun
8	294	4 May 2023	Training	Jung Yun-ji / Hong Gi-suk; Kim Hack-geon
9	295	4 May 2023	Union	Jo In-taek
10	296	4 May 2023	Smartphone	Hong Gi-suk / Sung yu-jin Jo in-taek
11	297	4 May 2023	Trial	Lee Ji-Yeon
12	298	4 May 2023	Magic Clock	Oh Yeong-jun
13	299	4 May 2023	Crazy Love	Kim Hack-geon
14	300	4 May 2023	Island	Sung Yu-jin, Oh Yeong-jun
15	301	4 May 2023	Ping-Pong	Lee Ji-Yeon
16	302	4 May 2023	Larva Ranger 1	Ko Dong-Woo, Jung Yun-Ji
17	303	4 May 2023	Larva Ranger 2	Ko Dong-Woo, Kim Hack-geon
18	304	4 May 2023	Pupa 1	Jung Yun-Ji
19	305	4 May 2023	Pupa 2	Jung Yun-Ji
20	306	4 May 2023	Air Racing	Ko Dong-Woo
21	307	4 May 2023	Date	Oh young-jun, Lee Gyu-ri
22	308	4 May 2023	Puberty	Kim Hack-geon / Lee Gyu-ri; Sung yu-jin / Hong Gi-suk
23	309	4 May 2023	Christmas	Lee Gyu-ri, Lee Hyan-hee
24	310	4 May 2023	Guest	Kim Ji-yeon / Jung Yun-ji; Sung Yu-jin / Lee Gyu-ri
25	311	4 May 2023	Attack	Hong Gi-suk, Oh young-jun
26	312	4 May 2023	The Family	Oh young-jun

=== Season 6: Larva in Mars (2024) ===
No. in season	No. Overall	Original air date	Title	Storyboarded by
1	313	13 January 2024	Larva in Mars	TBA
2	314	13 January 2024	Gravity	TBA
3	315	13 January 2024	Nice to Meet You	TBA
4	316	20 January 2024	Who Are You?	TBA
5	317	20 January 2024	Secret Space	TBA
6	318	20 January 2024	Paparazzi	TBA
7	319	27 January 2024	Audition	TBA
8	320	27 January 2024	Fart Baby 1	TBA
9	321	27 January 2024	Customer	TBA
10	322	27 January 2024	Magic Carpet	TBA
11	323	27 January 2024	Hairstyle 1	TBA
12	324	27 January 2024	Hairstyle 2	TBA
13	325	3 February 2024	Live	TBA
14	326	3 February 2024	Music Therapy	TBA
15	327	3 February 2024	Spice	TBA
16	328	3 February 2024	Escape	TBA
17	329	10 February 2024	Slurp Slurp	TBA
18	330	10 February 2024	Free Seed 1	TBA
19	331	10 February 2024	Free Seed 2	TBA
20	332	10 February 2024	Blind Date	TBA

=== Netflix films (2020–22) ===
==== The Larva Island Movie ====
The Larva Island Movie is an animated Netflix film that serves as the canonical finale to Larva Island. The film focuses on Chuck, who has returned to civilization long after the events of "Drift", telling the events of the Island to a reporter named Grace. The film was released on 23 July 2020.

==== Larva Pendant ====
Larva Pendant is 2022 animated 33-minute special that is set after the events of Larva Island but before of The Larva Island Movie. The film is about Red and Yellow discovering a city but must stop an evil man who is using bugs to help him grow hair. The short film was released on 25 May 2022.

=== Feature film ===
==== Larva the Movie ====
Larva the Movie is an upcoming film that takes place either between the events of Larva Family and Larva in Mars or after Larva in Mars.

== Reception ==
Emily Ashby from the organization Common Sense Media rated Larva three stars. She praised the show for showing the perspective of Red and Yellow, stating "because the characters are the size of worms, everything around them is larger than life, and that perspective is always fun to see in action." Issac Butler of Slate described Larva as "the most terrifying show on Netflix" and mocked its excessive toilet humor in a tongue-in-cheek article. Ivan Lin of Asia First Media recognized the characters' innovative contributions in educational videos.
