= List of Motu Patlu episodes =

Motu Patlu is an Indian animated sitcom that premiered on Nickelodeon in India on 16 October 2012. The show is available in Hindi, Tamil, Telugu, Malayalam, Marathi, Kannada, Odia and Bengali. The series is adapted from the classic comic strip Lotpot. It focuses on the misadventures of two friends, Motu and Patlu, landing in trouble and comical situations, later being rescued only by luck. It is one of the most popular kids' shows in India.

== Episode list ==
=== Season 1 ===
Episode No.	Title
1	John Banega Don
2	Pilot Training
3	Scooter Race
4	Angry Clouds
5	Baby Dinosaur
6	Antriksh Yatra
7	Car Park
8	Time Machine
9	Animal Instinct
10	Diamond Robbery
11	Jagtey Raho
12	Bomb Ki Khabar
13	Chamatkari Mukut
14	Boxer's Baby
15	Super Duper Man
16	Race To Rock Garden
17	Flying Helmet
18	Road Roller
19	Ice Factory
20	Photography Competition
21	Motu Patlu MBBS
22	Mehnat Ki Kamayee
23	Lottery
24	Motu The Alien
25	Future Camera
26	Cross Connection
27	Robot Dog
28	Motu Banega Don
29	Super Murgiyan
30	Amir Chand Fakir Chand
31	Yamraj
32	FWWE Fight
33	Jinn
34	Murti Ki Khoj
35	Tigerrrrrrr
36	Ek Thee Heroine
37	Magician
38	Peacock Fish
39	Mela
40	Bhoot Bangla
41	Trekking
42	Salim Robot
43	Black Bull
44	Kite Competition
45	Hawaldar
46	Bodyguard
47	Giant Mosquitoes
48	Big John
49	Chamatkari Chashma
50	Mithai Ki Dukan
51	Samudri Khajana
52	Cricket League

=== Season 2 ===
Episode No.	Title
53 [1]	Snow Park
54 [2]	Ants Land
55 [3]	Circus
56 [4]	Gulabi Hathi
57 [5]	Film Producer
58 [6]	Soul Change
59 [7]	Gold Samosa
60 [8]	Army
61 [9]	Wishing Stone
62 [10]	Mermaid
63 [11]	Dance Competition
64 [12]	Hero Se Zero
65 [13]	Rock Band
66 [14]	Wajan
67 [15]	The Game
68 [16]	Lost Island
69 [17]	Jhatka Ki Shaadi
70 [18]	Chamatkari Joota
71 [19]	Motu Ka Birthday
72 [20]	Holi
73 [21]	Motu Ke Clones
74 [22]	Mummy
75 [23]	Madari
76 [24]	Memory Loss
77 [25]	Duplicate Patlu
78 [26]	Tel Malish
79 [27]	Ward Boys
80 [28]	Hero No 1
81 [29]	Car Mechanic
82 [30]	Reporter
83 [31]	Carrot Thief
84 [32]	Captain Crook
85 [33]	Patlu's Mustache
86 [34]	Prince Motu
87 [35]	Samosaaaaaaaa
88 [36]	Giant Tree
89 [37]	Car Wash
90 [38]	Football Match
91 [39]	Hawai Safar
92 [40]	Samaaj Sewa
93 [41]	Robot Hand
94 [42]	Shaving Foam
95 [43]	Furfuri Nagar And Bank
96 [44]	Boxing Competition
97 [45]	Bin Bulaye Baraati
98 [46]	Motu Ki Height
99 [47]	Third Eye
100 [48]	Hungry Motu
101 [49]	Makaan Malik
102 [50]	Dog Training Center
103 [51]	Pari Ka Vardaan
104 [52]	Tuition Teacher
105 [53]	Dragon Motu
106 [54]	John Ka Badla
107 [55]	Friendship Gift
108 [56]	Chote Chote Motu Patlu
109 [57]	Baby Alien
110 [58]	Ek Se Badhkar Ek
111 [59]	Office Cleaning
112 [60]	Ruk Motu Ruk
113 [61]	Fauji Uncle
114 [62]	Old Car Auction
115 [63]	The Golden Goose
116 [64]	Magical Scenery
117 [65]	Chotu Ka Homework
118 [66]	Chuha Daud Billi Ayee
119 [67]	Motu Patlu Ka Dhamal
120 [68]	Jhatka Experiment
121 [69]	Health Competition
122 [70]	John The Gentleman
123 [71]	Snow Man
124 [72]	Gold Coin
125 [73]	John Ka Jaal
126 [74]	Sleepy Motu
127 [75]	Mandir Ka Khajana
128 [76]	Shooting
129 [77]	Mobike Ride Mobike Ride
130 [78]	Motu Ka Jukam
131 [79]	Udhar
132 [80]	Bull Power
133 [81]	Robot Horse
134 [82]	Furniture Ki Dukaan
135 [83]	Dhaba
136 [84]	Giant Ka Muqabla
137 [85]	Hawa Mahal
138 [86]	Motu Ki Dosti
139 [87]	Alien's House
140 [88]	Magical Book
141 [89]	African Safari
142 [90]	Giant Roses
143 [91]	Cake Competition
144 [92]	Golf Course
145 [93]	Alien Ke Samose
146 [94]	Furfuri Nagar Bhoot
147 [95]	Humpty Dumpty
148 [96]	Magical Flute
149 [97]	Space Ship
150 [98]	Fancy Dress Party
151 [99]	Shaitan Ice Cubes
152 [100]	Motu Vs John
153 [101]	Monkey Kingdom
154 [102]	Motu Patlu in Hotel
155 [103]	Personality Change Machine
156 [104]	Photo Shop

=== Season 3 ===
Episode No.	Title
157 [1]	Bunty Bablu
158 [2]	Lambi Lambi Naak
159 [3]	Bura Na Mano Masti Hai
160 [4]	Motu Patlu Ka Makan
161 [5]	Bijli Gul
162 [6]	Dahi Handi
163 [7]	Golden Butterfly
164 [8]	Hawayee Dhaba
165 [9]	Animal Park
166 [10]	Shopping Mall
167 [11]	Holi Hai Bhai Holi Hai
168 [12]	Magic Bag
169 [13]	Magnetic Motu
170 [14]	The Kung Fu Master
171 [15]	Birthday Dhamal
172 [16]	Doggy Se Mukabla
173 [17]	Jungle Me Mangal
174 [18]	Hungama Ho Gaya
175 [19]	Future News Tab
176 [20]	Dog in the Well
177 [21]	Shadi Ka Dhamal
178 [22]	Alien Patlu
179 [23]	Motu Ka Sapna
180 [24]	Motu Patlu in Antarctica
181 [25]	Intelligent Motu
182 [26]	Cycle Race
183 [27]	Buzo Ko Bachana Hai
184 [28]	Motu Balloon
185 [29]	Timepass
186 [30]	The Electric Man
187 [31]	Magical Scissor
188 [32]	The Devil Toothpaste
189 [33]	John's Birthday Gift
190 [34]	Slow Motion Gadget
191 [35]	Don The Magician
192 [36]	The Life of Rat
193 [37]	Aadiwasi Ka Mukut
194 [38]	Robot of Furfuri Nagar
195 [39]	Motu Patlu Ki Jodi
196 [40]	Bravery Competition
197 [41]	1 Jinn 2 Malik
198 [42]	The Bulk
199 [43]	Rocky Ka Ghar
200 [44]	Cricket Match
201 [45]	The Battle of Tree
202 [46]	Naagon Se Panga
203 [47]	Cylinder Ki Sawaari
204 [48]	Positive Motu
205 [49]	The Treasure Hunt
206 [50]	John and the Hen
207 [51]	Motu The Scientist
208 [52]	Human Remote Control
209 [53]	Motu Patlu Ki Car
210 [54]	The Revenge of Crows
211 [55]	The Golden Chariot
212 [56]	Auto Rickshaw
213 [57]	Water Problem
214 [58]	Alien Hat
215 [59]	Wish Point
216 [60]	Dhongi Jyotishi
217 [61]	Motu Patlu The Fire Fighter
218 [62]	The Magical Album
219 [63]	Tabela
220 [64]	Traffic Police
221 [65]	Swimming Pool
222 [66]	Rupya Dus Karod
223 [67]	The Smart Missile
224 [68]	Athwa Ajooba
225 [69]	Fire Ball Aliens
226 [70]	Patakhey Ki Dukan
227 [71]	Yog Guru Motu
228 [72]	Satellite Patlu
229 [73]	House Cleaning
230 [74]	Samosey Wali Murgi
231 [75]	Ants Attack
232 [76]	Tiger John
233 [77]	Sevak John
234 [78]	Bahaduri Puruskar

=== Season 4 ===
Episode No.	Title
235[1]	Motu Ki Poonch
236[2]	Mermaid Patlu
237[3]	Baar Baar Lagataar
238[4]	April Fool
239[5]	Motu Ka Gadha
240[6]	Motu Ka Commitment
241[7]	Colour Changing Camera
242[8]	Khatrey Ki Ghanti
243[9]	Kal Karey So Aaj Kar
244[10]	Bada Kabutar
245[11]	Mimicry Parrot
246[12]	Motu Patlu Ki Bus
247[13]	Dost No. 1
248[14]	Motu Ka Smart Phone
249[15]	Furfuri Nagar Ka Mayor
250[16]	Motu Twister
251[17]	Motu Patlu Kidnapped
252[18]	Motu Patlu Ka Ghar
253[19]	Commando Training
254[20]	Bolney Wali Moorti
255[21]	The Magical Bells
256[22]	Buri Nazar Waaley Tera Munh Laal
257[23]	John The Bodyguard
258[24]	The Evil Goggles
259[25]	Motu The King of Tribe
260[26]	Slippery Motu
261[27]	Motu Patlu Canteen
262[28]	The Magical Laptop
263[29]	Motu Patlu Acchey Insaan
264[30]	Baby Alien
265[31]	Motu Patlu Jasoos
266[32]	Pizza Boys
267[33]	Furfuri Nagar Mein Bhoot
268[34]	Motu The Sun Flower
269[35]	Courier Company
270[36]	John’s Mask
271[37]	Motu-Patlu Jinn
272[38]	Motu-Patlu in Hotel
273[39]	Chingum Ek Roop Anek
274[40]	Bhukkad Patlu
275[41]	Sniffer Dog
276[42]	Teleporting Machine
277[43]	Bachche Motu Patlu
278[44]	Lie Detector Robot
279[45]	Kabaddi Kabaddi
280[46]	Party Aaj Raat Ko
281[47]	Motu Patlu in Balloon
282[48]	Motu Ka Darr
283[49]	Motu Ki Khushi
284[50]	Bahadur Motu
285[51]	Inaam Dus Karod
286[52]	Jyotishi Motu
287[53]	Shaitanee Zuban
288[54]	Motu Patlu Ki Dukan
289[55]	Puncture Shop
290[56]	Bat in the Town
291[57]	Supersonic Speed Band
292[58]	Motu Patlu Ki Tow Chain
293[59]	Singing Competition
294[60]	Action Duplicating Machine
295[61]	The Villain Mask
296[62]	Chacha Ki Tijori
297[63]	Alien Calling Machine
298[64]	Energy Charger
299[65]	Duplicate Chingum
300[66]	The Train
301[67]	Dog Show
302[68]	King Patlu
303[69]	Asli Raja Nakli Raja
304[70]	Magical Pencil
305[71]	Invisible Bomb
306[72]	Motu Ke Ghar Ka Renovation
307[73]	Best Friend Award
308[74]	Motu Patlu Ka ATM
309[75]	Gilli Danda Competition
310[76]	Motu Patlu in Pyramid
311[77]	Pirates of Furfuri Nagar
312[78]	Invisible John

=== Season 5 ===
Episode No.	Title
313[1]	Mr. Gayab
314[2]	Yam Hain Hum
315[3]	Murkh Nagari
316[4]	Chala Hai Motu Hero Banney
317[5]	Robotic Taanga
318[6]	Super Star Motu Patlu
319[7]	Don Ki Junglee Billian
320[8]	Flying Bus
321[9]	Alien Shankh
322[10]	Diamonds In The Train
323[11]	Motu Mobile
324[12]	The Magical Camera
325[13]	Ice Hockey
326[14]	Chamatkari Locket
327[15]	Chipko Stick Ka Dhamal
328[16]	Chingum Ki Chori
329[17]	Fortune Wheel
330[18]	Dr. Jhatka Ke Dadaji
331[19]	Don Ka Birthday
332[20]	Dr. Jhatka Ka Laser Cutter
333[21]	Message Ka Rahasya
334[22]	Mayor John
335[23]	Meals On Wheel
336[24]	Motu Ki Self Defence
337[25]	Motu Loudspeaker
338[26]	Motu Patlu Ki Deewar
339[27]	Patlu Ke Haath
340[28]	Police Station Mein Tabela
341[29]	Thanda Thanda Cold Cold
342[30]	Roller Skate Thief
343[31]	John Ke Missiles
344[32]	Badhti Ka Naam Dadhi
345[33]	Pigeon Paying Guest
346[34]	John's Certificate
347[35]	Lathi Charge
348[36]	Motu Ka Vachan
349[37]	Mobile Tower
350[38]	John The Superhero
351[39]	Body Control Machine
352[40]	Joker Motu Patlu
353[41]	Madari Ki Rassi
354[42]	Denture Alien
355[43]	Eyes Of Motu Patlu
356[44]	Glass Man Alien
357[45]	Motu Patlu Ka Photo Phone
358[46]	Motu's Friend Yeti
359[47]	Stone Man
360[48]	Toys Attack
361[49]	Ghasitaram The Cloud Man
362[50]	Revenge Of John
363[51]	Motu Patlu In Mines
364[52]	Motu Patlu Ka Aam
365[53]	Motu Ke Sapne
366[54]	Furfuri Marathon
367[55]	Motu Master Chef
368[56]	Burey Fansey
369[57]	John's Body Suit
370[58]	Lakshman Rekha
371[59]	Motu The Monkey Man
372[60]	John Ek Roop Anek
373[61]	Shaitan Murga
374[62]	John The Alien
375[63]	Ajab Gajab Poster
376[64]	Magical Coin
377[65]	Chalaak John
378[66]	Meteor Alien Attack
379[67]	Bahroopiye Patakhey
380[68]	Safety Book
381[69]	John Ka Challenge
382[70]	Electric Shoes
383[71]	Yamraj Ka Ear Phone
384[72]	Motu Ki Chheenk
385[73]	Motu Ki Shaadi
386[74]	John The Mosquito
387[75]	Phata Poster Nikla Motu
388[76]	Dr. Jhatka Ki Ulta Pulta Machine
389[77]	Tijori Ka Raaz
390[78]	Patlu Ki Beemari

=== Season 6 ===
Episode No.	Title
391[1]	Rangeela Baba
392[2]	Jadoogarini Ka Seb
393[3]	Shrinking Machine
394[4]	John Ka Bhoot
395[5]	John The Circus Man
396[6]	Alien Doll
397[7]	Doggy Days Out
398[8]	John Ka Bhookamp
399[9]	Magical Wrist Watch
400[10]	Sachha Mann
401[11]	Devil's Stone
402[12]	Anti Theft Medicine
403[13]	Karamati Binoculars
404[14]	Lucky Coin
405[15]	Mehman John
406[16]	Magical Tattoos
407[17]	Alien Ball
408[18]	Dayawan Motu
409[19]	Shaitan Murti
410[20]	Bakra
411[21]	Unbreakable
412[22]	Ear Man Motu
413[23]	Weight Machine
414[24]	Bold Se Old Laser Pen
415[25]	Police Van
416[26]	Motor Cycle Ka Dhamal
417[27]	Heerey Ki Talash
418[28]	Motu Ke Samose Ki Dukan
419[29]	Lost Island
420[30]	Furfuri Nagar Club
421[31]	Machine Man
422[32]	Sitar Wala Kungfu Master
423[33]	Super Duper Fan
424[34]	Battery Power
425[35]	Alarm Clock
426(36]	Judwa Boxer
427[37]	Chingum Ka Farm House
428[38]	Johnny Madadgar
429[39]	Samosa Vending Machine
430[40]	Boxing Gloves
431[41]	Bhalu Ka Aatank
432[42]	Patlu Pahlwan
433[43]	Badal Mein Ghar
434[44]	Motu Ke Baal
435[45]	Spin Rotator
436[46]	Laal Pari
437[47]	Daldali Teer
438[48]	Amusement Park Mein Dhamal
439[49]	Jadoogarni Ka Jhadu
440[50]	Jadoogar Joker
441[51]	Patlu Ki Race
442[52]	Inspector Patlu
443[53]	Motu Patlu Ball Game
444[54]	Motu Ka Rona
445[55]	Motu Ka Gussa
446[56]	Motu Ki Roshni
447[57]	Kushti Ka Mukabla
448[58]	Motu Patlu Ki Gift
449[59]	Dr Jhatka Ki Washing Machine
450[60]	Diamonds And Balloons
451[61]	Wo Bhi Kya Din Thhe
452[62]	Motu Patlu in Frog World
453[63]	Hum Chor Nahin
454[64]	Donkey With Horn
455[65]	Ajnabi Chor
456[66]	Motu Ki Umar
457[67]	John Ka Rumaal
458[68]	Power of Imagination
459[69]	Shocking News Ka Shock
460[70]	Jyotishi Tota
461[71]	Bubblegum Bomb
462[72]	Motu Patlu The Truck Driver
463[73]	Jailer Alien
464[74]	Motu Patlu The Plumber
465[75]	Khamosh Motu
466[76]	Hands Up Gun
467[77]	TV Antenna
468[78]	Motu The Super Dog Man

=== Season 7 ===
Episode No.	Title
469[1]	Alien Chasma
470[2]	Horn Please
471[3]	Adventure of Mansi And Akaash
472[4]	Motu Patlu in Jail
473[5]	Baazon Se Takkar
474[6]	Guru Ho Ja Shuru
475[7]	Motu Patlu Aur Madhumakkhi
476[8]	Animal Converting Gadget
477[9]	Jaadui Anguthi
478[10]	John Ki Chaal Motu Patlu Behal
479[11]	Khajaney Ki Taslash
480[12]	Motu Ka Phone Ka Shauk
481[13]	Na Kehna Mana Hai
482[14]	Dr Jhatka Ki Fighting Machine
483[15]	Motu Patlu Pareshan
484[16]	John's Air Line
485[17]	Chingum Hi Chingum
486[18]	John The Robot
487[19]	The Scientist Neighbour
488[20]	Naughty Motu
489[21]	Motu Eraser
490[22]	John Ek Icchhadhari Naag
491[23]	John Shrinks Motu Patlu
492[24]	Bhullakad Motu
493[25]	Motu The Roller Skate Coach
494[26]	Motu The Grass Eater
495[27]	Motu The Running Man
496[28]	Motu Patlu The Best Commandos
497[29]	Motu The King of Mummies
498[30]	Motu Ke Andey
499[31]	Remote Control
500[32]	Panni Ka Darr
501[33]	Motu The Alien
502[34]	John The Bee Man
503[35]	John Ka Body Guard
504[36]	Helpline
505[37]	Good Luck – Bad Luck
506[38]	The Crystal Camera
507[39]	Bahadur No. 1
508[40]	Motu Ke Sawal
509[41]	The Danger Man
510[42]	The Special Armour Suit
511[43]	The Agreement
512[44]	Motu Patlu Laundry Shop
513[45]	Motu – Akbar The Great
514[46]	The Golden Aliens
515[47]	Motu The Doctor
516[48]	Macchar In The Car
517[49]	The Root Attack
518[50]	Bhooton Ki Lottery
519[51]	The Flying Lift
520[52]	Hansna Zaroori Hai

=== Season 8 ===
Episode No.	Title
521[1]	Badshah Chingum
522[2]	Choron Ka Raja Chingum
523[3]	Motu Ka Power Nap
524[4]	Ziddi Motu
525[5]	Brake Machine
526[6]	Adbut Gadgeet
527[7]	Scientist Motu Patlu
528[8]	Dr Jhatka Ki All Weather Shirt
529[9]	Rat World
530[10]	Bees In The Home
531[11]	Motu The Judge
532[12]	Motu Patlu Ki Dosti Vs. Science
533[13]	Motu Ka Business
534[14]	Motu Patlu Air Bus
535[15]	Local Game Competition
536[16]	Jhatka Ka Power Download Gadget
537[17]	Chalak Singh Ki Chalaki
538[18]	The Gang of Thugs
539[19]	Children's Day
540[20]	Asli Doodh Aur Nakli Doodh
541[21]	Chotu Ki Car
542[22]	Motu The Director
543[23]	Furfuri Nagar Tower
544[24]	Motu Ke Haath
545[25]	Motu Ki Tez Aankhein
546[26]	Motu Ki Jaduyee Cheenk
547[27]	Doodh Ka Doodh Pani Ka Pani
548[28]	Boxer Ki Akad
549[29]	The Magical Crow
550[30]	Motu Ki Bhavishyavani
551[31]	Invisible Oil
552[32]	John The Dog Painter
553[33]	Motu Ka Cycle Chalana
554[34]	Motu Ki Haath Ki Safai
555[35]	Robot Uncle
556[36]	Bhuddu No. 1
557[37]	Motu Ka Selfie Shauk
558[38]	The Fake Jinn Lamp
559[39]	Ghasitaram Ki Bike
560[40]	Motu The Jinn
561[41]	Motu Patlu The Gardener
562[42]	Onions
563[43]	Motu Ki Beemari
564[44]	Motu Patlu Baby John
565[45]	Party Invitation
566[46]	Motu Bhag Bandar Aaya
567[47]	Circus Ka Ghoda
568[48]	Ped Wala Baba
569[49]	Pappe Da Dhaba
570[50]	Patlu Robot
571[51]	Motu Ka Laddu
572[52]	Motu The AC
573[53]	Motu Paltu Taxi Service
574[54]	Motu Ke Achaar
575[55]	Mr. Justice ka insaaf
576[56]	Moorti Ka Dhammal
577[57]	Doggy Pyar
578[58]	The Watchman
579[59]	Motu Bhaag Peechey Aag
580[60]	Loss Of Words
581[61]	John Ka Jaal
582[62]	Pigeon Courier Service
583[63]	John Ka Jigri Dost
584[64]	John Ka Samosa
585[65]	Smile Please
586[66]	Chingum ki Yaadddasht
587[67]	Chingum Ke Lambe Haath
588[68]	The Magical Trees
589[69]	Motu Ka Samosa Shauk
590[70]	John Ka Bhai Jonny
591[71]	John Ki Jungle Safari
592[72]	Dr Jhatka Ki Twister Lattu
593[73]	Furfuri Nagar Ki Diwali
594[74]	Chingum Ki Gun
595[75]	Jhatka Ka Choomantar Gadget
596[76]	Motu Patlu Ki Nursery
597[77]	Jasoos Motu
598[78]	Motu Ka Drawing Competition

=== Season 9 ===
Episode No.	Title
599[1]	Makdi Ka Jaala
600[2]	Boxer Ki Neend
601[3]	Motu Ki Teerandazi
602[4]	Bolna Mana Hai
603[5]	Motu Patlu Ki Roof Repair
604[6]	Jumping Jack Motu Patlu
605[7]	Motu Patlu Ki Murgi
606[8]	Driver No 1
607[9]	Motu Patlu Ka Mobile Theatre
608[10]	Chaalak Naukar
609[11]	Kaagaj Ka Aadmi
610[12]	Fighting Zone
611[13]	John The Hammer Man
612[14]	Rat Attack
613[15]	Motu Patlu Vs Dinosaur
614[16]	Motu The Chef
615[17]	Motu Patlu Aur Shaitani Putla
616[18]	Saanpon Ka Hungama
617[19]	Motu The Star
618[20]	John Ka Threadmill
619[21]	Dr Jhatka Ka Teleporting Machine
620[22]	Machhliyon Ki Azadi
621[23]	Motu's Kathak Dance
622[24]	Safed Hathi
623[25]	Robot Chingum
624[26]	Dhakka Maar
625[27]	Crying Magician
626[28]	Motu Patlu The Bodyguard
627[29]	Motu Ki Pitayi
628[30]	Ichhadhari Bhains
629[31]	Motu Ka Bachpana
630[32]	Chor Aliens
631[33]	Motu Ka Bull Dozer
632[34]	Motu Ki Train
633[35]	John The Jaldev
634[36]	Khazana Khazana
635[37]	Motu Ki Bike
636[38]	Motu Ka Doggy
637[39]	Dr Jhatka Ki Smart Dustbin
638[40]	Kaidi Chingum
639[41]	Motu Ki Madad
640[42]	Motu Saves Alien
641[43]	Snake In The Car
642[44]	Gusse Wali Chai
643[45]	Motu Ki Jaadu Ki Chadi
644[46]	Motu Aur Sher
645[47]	Patluji Ki Dulhania
646[48]	John Ka Baadal Bijli
647[49]	John Ka Birds
648[50]	Bure Kaam Ka Bura Nateeja
649[51]	John Ek Behrupiya Chor
650[52]	Motu Patlu Ki Naukri
651[53]	Dr Jhatka Ki Stone Age Machine
652[54]	Jhoot Bole Kauwa Kaate
653[55]	Motu Patlu In Mauritius
654[56]	Invisible Cage
655[57]	Kuch Kuch Dikta Hai
656[58]	Boxer Ki Car
657[59]	John Ke Bhoot
658[60]	Chand Pe Makan
659[61]	Motu Patlu Ki Painting
660[62]	Dr Jhatka Ka Umbrella
661[63]	John Ka Eye Checkup Camp
662[64]	Motu Ka Film Share Award
663[65]	Dr Jhatka Ka Mind Printer
664[66]	Motu Patlu Tree Eater Ghost
665[67]	Maan Na Maan Ma Tera Mehman
666[68]	Motu Ka Insaaf
667[69]	Boxer Ki Boxing
668[70]	Dr Jhatka Ka Mind Projector
669[71]	Motu Patlu Aur Lalchi Alien
670[72]	Chingum Ke Chacha
671[73]	Heeron Ki Pagdi
672[74]	Motu Ka Pollution
673[75]	Motu Ek Murtikar
674[76]	Motu On Demand
675[77]	Gravity Gel
676[78]	Motu Patlu Ki Inter Planet Diwali
677[79]	Diwali Me Samaj Seva
678[80]	John Ki Deemak
679[81]	Samose Samose Kaise Kahoon
680[82]	Dr. Jhatka Ki Lassi
681[83]	Motu Ka Robot
682[84]	Din Dahade Chori
683[85]	Motu Ki Son Chidiya
684[86]	Patlu Ki Dosti
685[87]	Weather Out Of Control
686[88]	Motu Patlu Ki Secretary
687[89]	Patlu Ki Choti
688[90]	Mermaid Ka Rahasya
689[91]	Patlu Ka Chasma
690[92]	Dr Jhatka Ka Street Signal
691[93]	Motu Ki Event Management
692[94]	Drone Delivery
693[95]	Inspired Motu
694[96]	John Ke Aliens
695[97]	Motu Patlu Ki Advertising Agency
696[98]	John Ka Self Damage Spray
697[99]	Motu Ka Teddy Bear
698[100]	Magnetic Ball
699[101]	Motu Patlu Ka Dhaba
700[102]	Udtha Motu
701[103]	Motu The Encyclopedia
702[104]	Flat Ki Talash

=== Season 10 ===
Episode No.	Title
703[1]	Motu Patlu Ki Help Agency
704[2]	Ek Kadam Aage
705[3]	Ghasitaram Ki Shaadi
706[4]	Motu The Diaper Man
707[5]	Military Land Ka Sauda
708[6]	Motu Ka Papa Ka Bungalow
709[7]	Motu Ke Bahaney
710[8]	Jhatka Kidnapped In Modern City
711[9]	John Ka Sneezing Spray
712[10]	Jadoogar Phislekar Ka Bunglow
713[11]	Aliens On Call
714[12]	John The ATM Thief
715[13]	Don Ka Master Plan
716[14]	Tricycle Race
717[15]	Jaadu Ki Jhappi
718[16]	Alien Ka Khana
719[17]	Kripalu Baba
720[18]	Dr Jhatka's Car In Space
721[19]	Motu Ki Cloud Agency
722[20]	Motu Ka Dost
723[21]	Motu Ka Marriage Dance
724[22]	Picnic Party
725[23]	Secret File
726[24]	Laughter Club Ka Asar
727[25]	John Ka Mission Samosa
728[26]	Jhatka Ki Cloud Car
729[27]	Motu Patlu Ki Watch Tower
730[28]	Safayee Abhiyan
731[29]	Ching Chang Ka Mukut
732[30]	Motu Patlu Ki Air Taxi
733[31]	Motu Ka Khazana
734[32]	Every Man Is A Police Man
735[33]	Motu Patlu Morcha
736[34]	Motu Patlu Ki Marathon
737[35]	Blue Fire
738[36]	Boxer's Car From Modern City
739[37]	Motu Ka Biliards
740[38]	Hero Don
741[39]	Machhron Ka Humla
742[40]	John The Jalpari
743[41]	Motu The Radio Jockey
744[42]	Motu Loves Dancing
745[43]	Alien Mirror
746[44]	Monkey Trouble
747[45]	Nagmani Wala Donkey
748[46]	Motu The Jungle King
749[47]	Mayor Ka Election
750[48]	John Ki Sun Cream
751[49]	Greedy Dog
752[50]	Lungi Dance
753[51]	Pet's Home
754[52]	Panther In Modern City
755[53]	Social Media
756[54]	Motu Ke Bol
757[55]	Motu Patlu The Bus Driver
758[56]	Motu Patlu Ki Lazer Power
759[57]	John The Kid
760[58]	Motu Ka Fan
761[59]	John Ka Gas Cylinder
762[60]	Ghoonse Waaley Baba
763[61]	Motu Patlu Ki Dairy
764[62]	John The Power Snatcher
765[63]	Motu Ka Bank Loan
766[64]	Motu Ka Jaadu
767[65]	John Ke Snake
768[66]	Dr Jhatka Ki Furtili Chai
769[67]	Motu Ki Pagdi
770[68]	Motu Patlu Omlete Pav Shop
771[69]	Jhatka Ka Eye Clinic
772[70]	Motu The Pilot
773[71]	John The Kite Man
774[72]	Chotu Ka Project
775[73]	Alien Bracelet
776[74]	Motu Ki Bachat
777[75]	Motu Ki Mausi Vs. John Ki Mausi
778[76]	John Ke Robot Tree
779[77]	Boxer Ki Nayee Car
780[78]	Motu Ka Fear Factor
781[79]	John Ki Running Road
782[80]	Discount Sale
783[81]	Motu Patlu Ka Fire Extinguisher
784(82]	Motu Ka Inaam
785[83]	John Ki Tijori
786[84]	Poultry Farm
787[85]	Boxer Ki Biopic
788[86]	Bhulakad Chachu
789[87]	Humshakal Ki Talash
790[88]	Motu Ke Kharate
791[89]	Minister John
792[90]	Fire Brigade
793[91]	Nakli Sher
794[92]	MP Bank
795[93]	Motu Patlu Ka Fashion Show
796[94]	Don the Wolf Boy
797[95]	Motu Patlu Ki Car Race
798[96]	Motu Patlu App
799[97]	Apna Hotel
800[98]	Mr. Badbadiya
801[99]	Motu Patlu's Photo With Superstar
802[100]	Online Interview
803[101]	Motu Ki Dadi
804[102]	Motu's House on Sale
805[103]	The Letter Box
806[104]	Motu Patlu The Press Reporter

=== Season 11 ===
Episode No.	Title
807[1]	Trapped In the Tower
808[2]	John The Iron Man
809[3]	Cheeze Rat Trap
810[4]	Motu Ka Charity Prize
811[5]	Dagmagta Motu
812[6]	Invisible Hathkadi
813[7]	Selfie Competition
814[8]	Welcome To Furfuri Nagar
815[9]	Detective Agency
816[10]	Holographic Order
817[11]	Chotu Ka Birthday
818[12]	Jhatka Ki Special Van
819[13]	John Ka Power Snatcher Powder
820[14]	Wrestlers in Motu Patlu's House
821[15]	John Ka Toofan
822[16]	John Ka Mineral Water
823[17]	Motu Patlu Ki Painting
824[18]	Motu The Hero
825[19]	Hi-Tech Gadget Agency
826[20]	Boxer Ki T-shirt
827[21]	Animals In The Home
828[22]	Motu Patlu In Enemy Camp
829[23]	Chaiwale Ki Memory Loss
830[24]	Motu Aur Jalpari
831[25]	Motu Patlu Ka Flying Ship
832[26]	Chala Hai Motu Actor Bananey
833[27]	Appu From Iceland
834[28]	Motu Bhag Chooha Ayaa
835[29]	Modern City Ki Sair
836[30]	Chingum Ka Walkie Talkie
837[31]	Asli John Ka Nakli Bhoot
838[32]	Crocodile Island
839[33]	Madadgar Motu
840[34]	Motu Patlu In Ant Land
841[35]	John Ka Karamati App
842[36]	Robotic Pixel Balls
843[37]	Motu And The Bone
844[38]	Crocodiles In The Lake
845[39]	Dustbin Gang
846[40]	John Ka Grand Plan
847[41]	Super Chalak Chor
848[42]	Patlu Ki Shadi
849[43]	Weight Loss Suit
850[44]	Butterfly Island
851[45]	Motu Ki Pareshani
852[46]	Modern City Vs. Hi-Tech City Cricket Match
853[47]	Motu Bhag Cheel Aayee
854[48]	Dhaki Chika Dhaki Chika Aliens
855[49]	Motu Patlu In Marriage
856[50]	Kite Festival
857[51]	Gold To Stone Gun
858[52]	Taka Jhaki
859[53]	Ghost Dost In Italy
860[54]	Motu Patlu Ka Target
861[55]	Motu Patlu In Star World
862[56]	Ghost Bungalow
863[57]	Mummy Attack
864[58]	Motu Patlu Save The World
865[59]	Bhar Pet Thali
866[60]	Mosquito's Promise
867[61]	Motu – King Alexander The Tenth
868[62]	Lion Zinda Hai
869[63]	Motu The Gladiator
870[64]	John The Baby Elephant
871[65]	The Atlas Man
872[66]	Magical Cannon Ball
873[67]	Missing Tower
874[68]	Birds' Navigation
875[69]	Samose In Paris
876[70]	Time Travel To Rome
877[71]	Giraffe Motu In Paris
878[72]	Speed King Robber
879[73]	Motu Patlu Ka Family Dinner In Paris
880[74]	Motu Patlu Ka Tabela
881[75]	King Uncle Ka Diamond
882[76]	The Kidnapping Of The Queen
883[77]	Football Games In England
884[78]	Theft On Stonehenge
885[79]	Motu Patlu Ka Car Wash
886[80]	Hotel Me Chori
887[81]	Top Of Europe
888[82]	Motu Patlu In Big Ben
889[83]	Diamonds On The Eiffel Tower
890[84]	John Ka Missile Attack
891[85]	Motu Patlu In London College
892[86]	The Secret Chip
893[87]	Motu Patlu The Dog Trainer
894[88]	Thieves In Louvre Pyramid
895[89]	Hostage On German Ship
896[90]	Motu Patlu At Buckingham Palace
897[91]	Haunted Palace In Rome
898[92]	Dr. Jhatka Ki Diary
899[93]	Motu The Hollywood Hero
900[94]	Advance Chariot Race
901[95]	Flat In Germany
902[96]	Motu Aur Giant Man
903[97]	Naughty Monkeys
904[98]	Statue In Museum
905[99]	Motu The Wrestling Champion
906[100]	Chor Ka Badla
907[101]	The Trembling Island
908[102]	Halloween In Germany
909[103]	Motu Ka Nakli Pair
910[104]	Motu Patlu Ki Car Race

=== Season 12 ===
Episode No.	Title
911[1]	Motu Ka Tabla Classes
912[2]	Motu Ka Kareedhari
913[3]	Mr Cheater Of Berlin
914[4]	Mystery Of Missing Scientist
915[5]	The Lost Train
916[6]	Motor Boat Competition Of Berlin
917[7]	Meals On Wings
918[8]	Cyrus Ka Virus
919[9]	Royal Horse Of London
920[10]	Crown Of Queen
921[11]	Tower Of Pisa Ki Chori
922[12]	Dr Missile
923[13]	Lucky Draw In London
924[14]	Saving Baby Reindeer
925[15]	Secret Agent In Rome
926[16]	The Killer Shark Of Berlin
927[17]	The Hypnotist Romeo In Rome
928[18]	The Ghost Train In Switzerland
929[19]	Bull Riding In Spain
930[20]	Picnic In Tree House
931[21]	House Arrest In Berlin
932[22]	Lion In The Train
933[23]	Bunkers In Albania
934[24]	The Giant Crab
935[25]	Motu Patlu Vs Dr Dino
936[26]	Birthday In Colosseum
937[27]	The Human Remote Control
938[28]	The Invisible Tribes Of Jungfraujoch
939[29]	International Don
940[30]	Motu Bhag Furniture Aaya
941[31]	Lake Of Fire
942[32]	Motu Patlu In Winter Palace
943[33]	Motu Bhag Froggy Aaya
944[34]	Motu The Uglu Buglu Man
945[35]	Twins Carnival In Jungfraujoch
946[36]	Curfew In Berlin
947[37]	Whistling Village
948[38]	Zebra Ants
949[39]	Angel Of Jungfraujoch
950[40]	Dr Jhatka Vs Dr Pathak
951[41]	The Chemical Reaction
952[42]	Gang Of Mr Snow
953[43]	Alien Castle
954[44]	Black Forest
955[45]	Khasna Mana Hai
956[46]	The Puppet Thieves
957[47]	Invisible Chor In Berlin
958[48]	Motu Patlu Vs Big Eye
959[49]	Mehnat Ki Kamayee
960[50]	Taj Mahal Ki Chori
961[51]	Motu Patlu In Rock Garden
962[52]	Motu The Anchor
963[53]	Do Karod Ke Joote
964[54]	Victoria 420
965[55]	Rhinoceros Gang
966[56]	Motu Patlu At Gateway Of India
967[57]	Ghar Pe Kabza
968[58]	Motu Patlu In Backwater
969[59]	Motu Patlu Vs Jinn
970[60]	Statue Of Rock Garden
971[61]	Rock Garden In Danger
972[62]	Intelligent Motu
973[63]	Udney Wala Gadget
974[64]	Sher Aaya Sher
975[65]	Ullu Banaya Bada Maza Aaya
976[66]	Juhu Beach Mein Dhammal
977[67]	Snake Bodyguards
978[68]	Motu Patlu In Hawa Mahal
979[69]	Motu Ki Handgun
980[70]	Invisible Qutub Minar
981[71]	Woodpecker Motu
982[72]	Motu Bhag Mummy Aayi
983[73]	Missing Doggy
984[74]	Baba Aur Bunty
985[75]	Motu Patlu Vs Chatur Lutera
986[76]	Chingum Hua Beghar
987[77]	Teleporting Toy Dog
988[78]	Victoria Memorial Ka Khazana
989[79]	Naughty Anaconda
990[80]	Motu Patlu Vs Werewolves
991[81]	Qutub Minar In Danger
992[82]	Motu Patlu In Elephanta Caves
993[83]	Totey Ki Bhavishyawani
994[84]	Typhoon The Havahavai
995[85]	Kissa Kahani Ka
996[86]	Relocating Charminar
997[87]	Head Ya Tail
998[88]	Motu Ka Horoscope
999[89]	Magician Of Vrindavan Garden
1000[90]	Motu Patlu Vs Naraz Chor
1001[91]	Motu Patlu Vs Denatasur
1002[92]	Motu Ke Message
1003[93]	Sea Creatures Attack
1004[94]	Motu Bana Badshah
1005[95]	The Train Robbery
1006[96]	Karey Koi Bharey Koi

=== Season 13 ===
Episode No.	Title
1007[1]	Golden Duck
1008[2]	Chalbaz Gang Of Bekal Fort
1009[3]	Motu Ke Aansoo
1010[4]	Flying Monkeys
1011[5]	Time Reversal Gadget
1012[6]	Motu Patlu In Red Fort
1013[7]	The Race To Howrah Bridge
1014[8]	Supernatural Men Of Bekal Fort
1015[9]	Hat Jo Bana De Hero
1016[10]	Mysterious Clouds Of Howrah Bridge
1017[11]	Bhoot Bulaya Motu Nay
1018[12]	Danda Gang
1019[13]	Toy Aliens
1020[14]	Khush Hona Mana Hai
1021[15]	Mystery Of Missing Tom
1022[16]	Bikers On Howrah Bridge
1023[17]	Detective Drone
1024[18]	Train Out Of Control
1025[19]	Meri Pareshani Teri Pareshani
1026[20]	Dog Trouble
1027[21]	Jaadugar Lambekaan
1028[22]	Aagyakari Gadget
1029[23]	The Mystery Of Elephanta Caves
1030[24]	Motu Patlu In Majestic Waterfall
1031[25]	Dr Wig Key Wigs
1032[26]	Kidnapping In Train
1033[27]	Big Toss Ka Task
1034[28]	Lizard Man In Howrah Bridge
1035[29]	The Stone Age
1036[30]	The Giant Lutera
1037[31]	The Mystery Of Missing Taj Mahal
1038[32]	Bhaaluon Ka Aatank
1039[33]	Run Monkey Motu Aaya
1040[34]	Terrorists Of Bekal Fort
1041[35]	John Ki Chaal
1042[36]	Dr Cactus Ke Cactus
1043[37]	Mano Ya Na Mano Yeti Hai
1044[38]	Motu The Spy
1045[39]	Dosti Gadget
1046[40]	Khatrey Mein Charminar
1047[41]	Baby Dinosaur Of Assam Tea Garden
1048[42]	Motu Patlu Vs Money Singh
1049[43]	The Golden Rat
1050[44]	Magical Glove
1051[45]	The Human Statue Garden
1052[46]	The Mask Gang
1053[47]	Flying Statues Of Rock Garden
1054[48]	Ninja Gang Of Vrindavan Garden
1055[49]	Train On The Road
1056[50]	Dreams Of Robot
1057[51]	Soldiers Of Red Fort
1058[52]	Magician Of Juhu Beach
1059[53]	Fighter Murga
1060[54]	Motu The Son Of Jinn
1061[55]	Robotic Jinn
1062[56]	Jasoos Ghasitaram
1063[57]	Chaiwala In Juhu Beach
1064[58]	Twister Mein Charminar
1065[59]	Ghost Of Charminar
1066[60]	Earthquake Of Victoria Memorial
1067[61]	Mumbai Ka Superhero
1068[62]	The Mystery Of Hot Water Spring
1069[63]	The Man From Future
1070[64]	Rabbit Thieves
1071[65]	Magical Trees
1072[66]	John Ke Bubble Gum
1073[67]	Chaiwala Kidnap
1074[68]	Monster Of Majestic Waterfall
1075[69]	Jungle On Howrah Bridge
1076[70]	Terrorist In Jaisalmer Fort
1077[71]	Magical Megaphone
1078[72]	Cycle Race
1079[73]	Crystal Aliens
1080[74]	John's Laughing Gas
1081[75]	Tea Man
1082[76]	Udneywala Auto
1083[77]	Trapped In Bhool Bhulaiyaa
1084[78]	Khopadi Ki Weighing Machine
1085[79]	Magical Stick
1086[80]	Boxing Championship In Juhu Beach
1087[81]	Magical Butterfly
1088[82]	Phati Jeans
1089[83]	The Umbrella Gang
1090[84]	John's Balloon Gun
1091[85]	Bolney Wala Camel
1092[86]	Bhootiya Haveli
1093[87]	Dosti Locket
1094[88]	John Ka Bhootia Plan
1095[89]	Motu Patlu In Film City
1096[90]	Locust Attack
1097[91]	Dolphins In Danger
1098[92]	Sand Ghost Of Howrah Bridge
1099[93]	Dinosaur Park
1100[94]	Rain Rain Go Away
1101[95]	Volleyball Match In Juhu Beach
1102[96]	The Liliputer King
1103[97]	Motu The Bat Boy
1104[98]	Animal Gang In Chandi Chowk
1105[99]	Aliens Of Howrah Bridge
1106[100]	Naarial Attack
1107[101]	Chingum The Superstar
1108[102]	Dicoits Of Chambal
1109[103]	Fun Without Fair
1110[104]	Trapped In Camera

=== Season 14 ===
Episode No.	Title
1111[1]	Chaos In Zoo
1112[2]	Bridge In Danger
1113[3]	The Angry Coalman
1114[4]	The Mysterious Baby
1115[5]	Boxer Ki Power
1116[6]	Shhhhhhhh Bhoot Hai
1117[7]	Boxer Vs Motu
1118[8]	Motu Ka Ped Lagao Abhiyan
1119[9]	Bubblegum Chor
1120[10]	Magical Moonchein
1121[11]	Bahar Ana Mana Hai
1122[12]	Boss No 1
1123[13]	Raja Ka Baj Gaya Baaja
1124[14]	Finding Bunny
1125[15]	Magical Wallet
1126[16]	Micky's Channel Hacked
1127[17]	Motu Patlu Ke Masterji
1128[18]	Ghasitaram Ki Power
1129[19]	Mr & Mrs Jack And Jill
1130[20]	The Magical Mask
1131[21]	Super Stars of Furfuri Nagar
1132[22]	Motu Patlu Ke Interview
1133[23]	Road Contractor
1134[24]	Motu Ki Akal
1135[25]	Ek Din Ka Inspector
1136[26]	Catch Me If You Can
1137[27]	Bath Tub On The Run
1138[28]	Motu Patlu Ki Circus
1139[29]	The Missing Home
1140[30]	Baar Baar Lagataar
1141[31]	Per Grooming Saloon
1142[32]	John Ke Shoes
1143[33]	Trekker In Danger
1144[34]	Motu Patlu Ki Driving School
1145[35]	Motu Bana Mor
1146[36]	The Mysterious Island
1147[37]	John Ki Mausi Return
1148[38]	Motu The Jungle Boy
1149[39]	John The Fear Man
1150[40]	Dr Jhatka Ki Cycle
1151[41]	Businessman Kidnapped
1152[42]	Race Down The Hill
1153[43]	Motu Ki Taarif
1154[44]	The Chocolate Factory
1155[45]	Sawaal Tumhara Jawaad Hamara
1156[46]	Motu The Postman
1157[47]	Motu's Strange Friend
1158[48]	Body Change Alien
1159[49]	Spider Ka Badla
1160[50]	Micky Ka Promotional Shoot
1161[51]	Mickey Kidnapped
1162[52]	The Fancy Dress Competition
1163[53]	The Magical Sage
1164[54]	Dr Jhatka Ka Eye Clinic
1165[55]	Cave Hunting Gadget
1166[56]	Motu Ka Gyan
1167[57]	Motu Patlu The Ticket Collector
1168[58]	Chingum Bana Thief
1169[59]	John Ka Ball Attack
1170[60]	Motu Bana Chuha
1171[61]	John The Principal
1172[62]	Motu Patlu School Get Together
1173[63]	Boxer Ka Gym
1174[64]	The Magical Water
1175[65]	John The Frog Rider
1176[66]	John Johnny Jonathan
1177[67]	Motu Ka Alien Fan
1178[68]	Motu Patlu The Mermaid
1179[69]	Motu The Destroyer
1180[70]	Picnic Mein Dhamaal
1181[71]	Furfuri Nagar Annual Competition
1182[72]	Motu Patlu The Ghost Hunter
1183[73]	Samurai Challenge
1184[74]	Night In Palace
1185[75]	Terror Of Jwala Singh
1186[76]	Electronic Hoardings
1187[77]	John The Electroman
1188[78]	John Ki Zombiestick

=== Season 15 ===
Episode No.	Title
1189[1]	Jadu Ki Potli
1190[2]	Motu John Ki Jodi
1191[3]	Motu Patlu And The Bull Ghost
1192[4]	Healthy Furfuri Nagar
1193[5]	Motu Patlu Games Of Tribe
1194[6]	Motu The Mango Man
1195[7]	Patlu Ka Idea Bulb Chori
1196[8]	Motu The Boss
1197[9]	Movers And Packers
1198[10]	John Ka Business
1199[11]	John The Ice Cream Seller
1200[12]	Cricket Match With Aliens
1201[13]	Motu Patlu Kung Fu School
1202[14]	Motu Patlu vs Kung Fu Master Cobra
1203[15]	Kung Fu Student Chingum
1204[16]	Motu Ki Samosa Power
1205[17]	Micky In Kung Fu School
1206[18]	Kung Fu Fighter Ghasitaram
1207[19]	Kung Fu vs Science
1208[20]	Motu Ki Sleeping Kung Fu
1209[21]	The Secret Of Kung Fu Dress
1210[22]	Kung Fu In The Mall
1211[23]	Motu Patlu Vs Evil Vamparina
1212[24]	Boxing Vs Kung Fu
1213[25]	Motu Patlu Vs Sumo King Bandora
1214[26]	Kung Fu Fever In The Town
1215[27]	Dr Jhatka Ka Kung-Fu
1216[28]	The Puppet Kung-Fu Fighter
1217[29]	Ding Bang The Time Stopper
1218[30]	Chameleon Kung-Fu Fighter
1219[31]	Kung-fu Student Of The Year
1220[32]	Tony The Twister
1221[33]	Kung-Fu In Museum
1222[34]	Motu Patlu Dragon Hunter
1223[35]	The Kung-Fu Ghost
1224[36]	Motu-Patlu Ka Kung-Fu Imtehan
1225[37]	Motu Patlu The Kung Fu Trainer
1226[38]	Motu Patlu The Kung Fu Soccer Championship
1227[39]	Motu Patlu The Police Inspector
1228[40]	Tornado In Town
1229[41]	Game Of John
1230[42]	Motu Patlu In Devil's Peak
1231[43]	Dr. Jhatka Ki Robotic Car
1232[44]	Motu Patlu Aur Underwater Champion
1233[45]	The Case Of Mrs Parrot Kidnapped
1234[46]	The Case Of Chingum Arrest
1235[47]	The Case Of Ghost Thief
1236[48]	Journey Of The Alien
1237[49]	The Case Of Fake Painting
1238[50]	The Case Of Haunted School
1239[51]	Patlu The Pirate
1240[52]	The Case Of Secret Code
1241[53]	The Thief Statues
1242[54]	The Case Of Bottle In River
1243[55]	The Case Of Lost Civilization
1244[56]	The Lost Mummy
1245[57]	The Case Of Stolen Guitar
1246[58]	The Case Of Super Hero Suit
1247[59]	The Case Of Futuristic Thief
1248[60]	The Case Of Missing Scientist
1249[61]	The Case Of Stolen Diwali Lights
1250[62]	The Case Of Spider Thief
1251[63]	The Case Of Leaf Thief
1252[64]	The Case Of John's Detective Agency
1253[65]	The Case Of Web Blackmailer
1254[66]	The Case Of Fake Currency
1255[67]	The Case Of Missing Jhatka
1256[68]	The Case Of Hypnotist Criminal
1257[69]	The Case Of Train Robbery
1258[70]	The Case Of London Eye

=== Season 16 ===
Episode No.	Title
1259[1]	Boxer Ki Kung Fu Training
1260[2]	Kung Fu Dadaji
1261[3]	Samurai Warrior From Future
1262[4]	The Statue Of Protector
1263[5]	The Return Of Vamperina
1264[6]	King Fu Hathkadi
1265[7]	Gorilla Kung Fu Master
1266[8]	Motu Patlu Vs Kung Chai Fu
1267[9]	Motu Patlu Vs Kung Fu Donkey
1268[10]	Motu Patlu Vs Leopard Chang
1269[11]	The Revenge Of Kung Fu King Cobra
1270[12]	Kung Fu In Hong Kong
1271[13]	Motu Patlu Vs Kung Fu Babies
1272[14]	Motu Patlu Vs Kung Fu Chef
1273[15]	Kung Fu Shooting Me Dhamal
1274[16]	Motu Patlu Vs Alien Kung Fu
1275[17]	Motu Patlu Vs Him Naresh
1276[18]	Kung Fu Clone Master
1277[19]	John Ka Samurai Boss
1278[20]	Motu Patlu Vs Kung Fu Magician
1279[21]	Motu Patlu The Kung Fu Champions
1280[22]	The Wooden Kung Fu Fighter
1281[23]	A Dancing Kung Fu Master
1282[24]	The Power Of Kung Fu Stone
1283[25]	Shadow Kung Fu Master
1284[26]	Motu Patlu Vs Hong Kong Kung Fu School

=== Special Episode ===
Episode No.	Title
Special Christmas EP	Merry Christmas
