= Lotpot =

Indian comic magazine

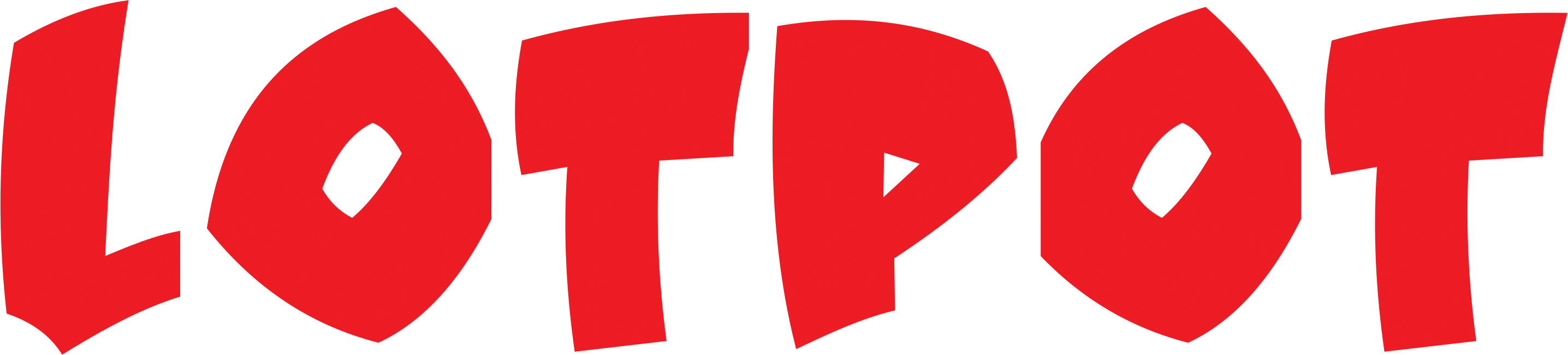
- Editor: P. K. Bajaj
- Categories: Comic book
- Frequency: Fortnightly
- First issue: 1969
- Company: Mayapuri Group
- Country: India
- Language: Hindi, English
- Website: lotpot.com

Lotpot is an Indian bilingual comic magazine published by Mayapuri Group. Lotpot title was registered by P. K. Bajaj in 1969 and the first issue came out in the same year and has been published without a break since then.

== History ==
Initially it was a weekly magazine which later on switched to fortnightly magazine after 2011. Later on, the magazine started publishing in English as well as Hindi. The circulation of Hindi versions reached 175,000 and of English version to 225,000.

Lotpot Comics belongs to the Mayapuri Group. It was started by late P. K. Bajaj, who successfully ran a printing press for calendars after he migrated from Pakistan to India in 1947. After the success of Lotpot Comics, he launched Mayapuri Magazine, which is for Bollywood journalism.

The characters of Motu Patlu, based on Handa Bhonda, were created by artist Kripa Shankar Bhardwaj.

Characters of Lotpot Comics got the opportunity to feature on air and became television shows for children such as Motu Patlu and Sheikh Chilli on Nickelodeon and Discovery Kids respectively.

Comic character Chacha Chaudhary was created by Pran Kumar Sharma in 1969 for Lotpot magazine, though it made its first appearance in 1971 in Lotpot.

== Associations ==
Lotpot Comics has had popular brand associations and collaborations in the past few years. Below are some of the associations.

- Nickelodeon (India): 3D animated series Motu Patlu on Nickelodeon India.
- Income Tax Department: Recently, the Income Tax Department created comic books where Motu Patlu explain the benefits of paying taxes and its use for the public good and infrastructure development in India. The comic books were launched by Indian Finance Minister Nirmala Sitaraman.
- Madame Tussauds India: Madame Tussauds India placed the Motu Patlu statues along with other famous known personalities at DLF Mall of India, Noida along with the Motu Patlu Statues there is also an interactive comic book screen with Lotpot characters and Neetu's Adventure Tapping Game for audiences to play. The same has been well-received and engaged audiences regularly. There is also a Motu Patlu–Madame Tussauds comic book available for sale at the merchandise counter.
- Austrian Embassy: The Austrian Embassy in Delhi collaborated with Lotpot Comics to release 2 comic books. Motu Patlu in Salzberg Motu Patlu in Vienna as part of boosting tourism in Austria.
- Pidilite Rangeela: The Mayapuri Group did a paid collaboration with Pidilite Rangeela wherein Pidilite gave free mini comic books along with its new range of crayons to children as a promotional gift in the Rangeela Khazana Pack.
- Toonpur Ka Super Hero: In December 2010, Lotpot had tied up with Ajay Devgan's animation film for children Toonpoor Ka Superhero and has come out with six special editions of the Lotpot.

== Characters ==
The main comic strip characters of the magazine are:

- Motu Patlu: Two friends, one fat man (Motu) and another slim man (Patlu), based on Stan Laurel and Oliver Hardy, who were shown being involved in comedic plots and appeared as foolish, but in the new strips, they were shown as heroes. The supporting characters with them were Dr. Jhatka, Ghasitaram, Chelaram, Dhelaram and Angoothanand. Kripa Shankar Bhardwaj was the original creator of these characters.
- Sheikh Chilli & Friendz: Sheikh Chilli and his friends Nuri Gin and Bulbul the Donkey lead their lives and come across various obstacles in their small town. Aired on Discovery Kids India from 2016 to 2018.
- Master Uncle: Master Uncle a humble but passionate school teacher who believes every child is special and enjoys teaching from books, along with play, activities, games and live examples. Students enjoy his class, and he is every student's favorite teacher. Gugli is the most mischievous student of his class, who keeps adding to the troubles in the class. Gugli and Master Uncle's challenges, fun and pranks to each other keep the class in good humour.
- Minni & the Girl Gang – The strip revolves around Minni and her gang of friends. Minni and her gang has a band called MINNI, an initialism Minni, Ira, Nandi, Notty (the squirrel) and Ikki. All four girls study in the same class. Minni's father is the principal of their school, due to which all of them also get into trouble sometimes due to Minni's mischief. Minni's mother loves to sing. Her voice is not melodious but keeps giving Minni's band suggestions on their music. Minni's gang is popular in their school, number one in studies, known for their mischief and not afraid of anyone. Their rivals are the Cheeka gang. Their gang members Punnu and Bonga always keep getting involved in fights with Minni.
- Mahabali Vishal: Vishal protects the dense forests of Southern India along with his Chimp, from poachers and sandalwood smugglers. The forest also has a secret nuclear lab of the Indian government and Dr. Bhama is in charge of the lab. He identifies Vishal's strength and superhuman abilities and equips him with new instruments which now enable the superhero to fly as well, in order to protect the lab.
- Banti & Chutki: Banti and Chutki are a pair of identical twins with intertwined traits and behaviours. If one gets hurt both feel pain. If one feels hungry both starts eating. Both are equally mischievous. Whoever's fault or mistake it might be, both take responsibility and support the other. The twins have a unique ability since birth that if they hold each other's hands they can jump very high.
- Natkhat Neetu: Natkhat Neetu has been a part of Lotpot Comics since 1979. Neetu is our main protagonist. He is depicted as kind, intelligent, and mischievous. Neetu is bold and always there when people need him. He has an energetic sense of humour and can be witty and excitable. He is very athletic and is a football captain at Dumdum Nagri School. He is in love with his football, Footi, and his special shoes, Rikki Tikki. Neetu loves his pet dog, Dogo. He is generally cheerful and adventurous. He is always excited and up for exploring new things, which often leads him to trouble. He experiences sheer panic when confronted with something unknown.
- Jaanbaaz Deva: Dr. Devkant is a scientist living in Devnagri. Devkant has done several discoveries in his lab to protect the earth. He keeps devising ways and means to protect earth. One night, Princess Sitara transfers magical powers when Devkant is asleep. When he wakes up, he finds himself extremely powerful and energized. His body is now rock solid, he can fly, and easily break heavy objects to pieces.
- Dipu – Master of Slingshot: Dipu is a brave and intelligent boy. He and his slingshot are both very popular in the entire town for their courage. Dipu's slingshot is not an ordinary one. Once, a spaceship drops a strange object in a nearby forest. Dipu's father, an inspector, finds it and brings it home. Dipu makes a slingshot from this object. However, he realizes the power of the object when he shoots a pebble which shoots at the speed of a rocket and destroys the object. Every thief in town is scared of him now.
- Kaka Shri – Kaka Shri is a mature old man who had started an orphanage and runs it with the help of Dara for children who are less fortunate. Well respected in the city Kaka Shri can solve any problem with his quick wit and Dara's strength.
- There were other comic strips, in the magazine of characters like Jasoos Champak & Chiller, Deepu, Chelaram, and Papitaram.
