= Motu Patlu =

Indian animated television show

- Genre: Comedy; Fantasy
- Created by: Jowthath Nadeem
- Based on: Motu Patlu by Kripa Shankar Bhardwaj
- Directed by: Suhas Kadav
- Voices of: Sourav Chakraborty; Omi Sharma; Sankalp; Brian D. Costa; Rajah; Renu Sharda; Umar Riaz
- Theme music composer: Sandesh Shandilya
- Opening theme: "Motu Aur Patlu Ki Jodi" by Sukhwinder Singh
- Ending theme: "Motu Aur Patlu Ki Jodi" by Sukhwinder Singh
- Composer: Sandesh Shandilya
- Country of origin: India
- Original language: Hindi
- No. of seasons: 16
- No. of episodes: 1,284 (list of episodes)

Production
- Executive producer: Anu Sikka
- Producers: Deepa Sahi; Anish JS Mehta
- Editor: Prasad K. Patil
- Running time: 9–12 minutes
- Production companies: Maya Digital Studios; Viacom18

Original release
- Network: Nickelodeon
- Release: 16 October 2012 – present

Related
- Inspector Chingum; Motu Patlu Stone Age Adventures

Motu Patlu is an Indian animated sitcom that premiered on Nickelodeon on 16 October 2012. Adapted from the classic comic strip Lotpot, the series focuses on the misadventures of two friends, Motu and Patlu, landing in trouble and comical situations, later being rescued only by luck.

One of the most popular kids' shows in India, the show is available in Hindi, Tamil, Telugu, Malayalam, Marathi, Kannada, Odia and Bengali. It started streaming digitally on Voot Kids in 2021.

== Premise ==
=== Setting ===
The series is set in the fictional town of Furfuri Nagar of India. It is a peaceful yet glamorous small town, simultaneously noble and squalid, adjoined by a river with a few shops, a large market area, a bus depot, a cluster of single-storeyed houses, temples, and a few recreational places. The town has three or more banks, three or more jewellery shops, Furfuri Nagar Police Station, Chingum's house, Boxer's house, Motu Patlu's house, Chaiwala's stall and house, Furfuri Nagar Central Jail, Furfuri Nagar Bus Stand, John's den, Dr. Jhatka's laboratory and house and Ghasitaram's house. There are a few villages and a few neighbouring cities around, such as Kamalpur, Sursuri Nagar and Modern City. Despite being a small town it has its own airport. It is not clearly mentioned where the town is exactly located, but most of the vehicles carry license plate numbers starting with "MH", which stands for the state of Maharashtra. The local police force wears uniforms of the Maharashtra Police.

However, in the later episodes, they moved to Modern City for unknown reasons (a quick trailer showcasing new episodes mentions the differences in their new setting), then go on a trip to countries in Europe and India. Some European and Indian countries and cities they visited include Pisa, Italy; Rome, Italy; Tuscany, Italy; London, England; Paris, France, Germany's Berlin, Switzerland's Top of Europe, Russia's St. Petersburg, England's Salisbury and Switzerland's Jungfraujoch, and the Taj Mahal (Agra), Gateway of India (Mumbai), Victoria Memorial (Kolkata), Qutub Minar (New Delhi), Hawa Mahal (Jaipur), Tea Plantation (Assam), Backwater (Kerala), Charminar (Hyderabad), Bandra-Worli Sea Link (Mumbai), Rock Garden (Chandigarh), Elephanta Caves (Mumbai), Bekal Fort (Kerala), Red Fort (New Delhi) and Howrah Bridge (Kolkata).

However, now they are back to Furfuri Nagar as same settings.

=== Plot ===
Motu and Patlu are two friends living in Furfuri Nagar. Samosas is Motu's favorite food, and he frequently tries to steal them from a small shopkeeper named Chaiwala, who makes the best samosas in the town, along with selling tea. After Motu eats samosas, he temporarily gains more energy and strength. Motu is mainly the black sheep of the duo, unintentionally creating problems due to his incompetency while Patlu is the smart one who always tries to stop him. The two land in trouble and comical situations, later being rescued only by luck. Ghasitaram occasionally misdirects and swindles them by making them try Dr. Jhatka's vast repertoire of quirky gadgets and gizmos.

The main antagonist of the series is a criminal named John the Don (briefly and very famously known as "John") who is accompanied by his two big but weak and dumb henchmen, Number 1 and Number 2, who steal people's money and jewelry and create havoc in Furfuri Nagar. John intends to become a don (gangster), but his plans always fail due to the heroic actions of Motu and Patlu, who trap and expose him and his plans tit for tat. In some episodes, John tries to harm them by stealing Dr. Jhatka's newest gadget and using it against Motu and Patlu, but they eventually manage to give John a taste of his own medicine.

== Characters ==
=== Main ===
- Motu: Motu is a fat man who serves as one of the central protagonists in this show. He loves to eat samosas. Motu's best friend is Patlu.
- Patlu: Patlu is a thin man who serves as one of the show's central protagonists. He is often portrayed as the smartest guy in the city; however, he often gets into a lot of trouble with Motu.

=== Recurring ===
- Inspector Chingum: Chingum is a police inspector. He believes that no criminal can escape from him, however, he manages to catch them mostly by the help of Motu and Patlu. He takes pride in the fact that no criminal can ever get away.
- Doctor Jhatka: Doctor Jhatka is an eccentric scientist, engineer, a doctor and an inventor, all skills combined together. His inventions are usually very impressive but are of little use to the townspeople, since some of them often gets someone in trouble.
- Ghasitaram: Ghasitaram is cowardly and often claims to have twenty years of experience in various stuff but only a very few of the experiences are useful to others.
- John: John serves as the main antagonist of the show. John's ambition is to become a Don. But his plans always fail very badly and thus end up in him getting arrested or being taunted by other people.
- Number 1: Number 1 is John's sidekick who serves as one of the supporting antagonists.
- Number 2: Number 2 is John's goon who rarely speaks.
- Chaiwala: Chaiwala owns a tea shop near Motu's house. He makes Motu's favorite samosas and Patlu's favorite tea in the city.
- Boxer: Boxer is Motu's neighbor, he is an aggressive man.

=== Other ===
- Khopdi: Khopdi is a goon in who always tries to defeat Motu Patlu. He is the Don of Modern City.
- Pappu-Haddi: They are two assistants of Khopadi.
- Skull: He is the elder brother of Khopdi. He likes to catch animals.
- Commissioner Bubblegum: Commissioner Bubblegum is Chingum's father and the police commissioner of Furfuri Nagar and adjoining villages.
- Hera Singh: Hera is Chingum's first Hawaldars.
- Pheri Lal: Pheri is Chingum's second Hawaldar.
- Sabziwali: Sabziwali sells the best vegetables in the whole Furfuri Nagar. Motu can be troublesome to her too at times and also owes her some money.
- Munni: Munni is Motu's sister who is shown very rarely in the episodes.
- Chotu: Chotu is Motu's nephew(Munni’s son). He wears a green T-shirt with a pink trousers. Sometimes, he wears a brown shirt with yellow trousers.
- Dr.Virus : Virus is a scientist, He always invents something for John. In return, he asks John for money but John somehow fools him and makes his run away. John uses his gadgets as a trial on him and puts Virus in trouble.
- Mickey: Mickey is Dr. Jhatka's nephew and is a video content creator and vlogger.

== Production ==
=== Music ===
The music featured in the series and film is written by Sandesh Shandilya, an Indian film composer. The theme song of the series, "Motu Aur Patlu Ki Jodi", is written by Gulzar and sung by Bollywood singer Sukhwinder Singh in Hindi.

== Films ==
No.	Title	Premiere date
1	Motu Patlu in Wonderland!	10 July 2013
2	Motu Patlu Mission Moon	25 December 2013
3	Motu Patlu Deep Sea Adventure	19 May 2014
4	Motu Patlu Kung Fu Kings	23 October 2014
5	Motu Patlu Khazaane Ki Race	26 January 2015
6	Motu Patlu Kung Fu King Returns	14 June 2015
7	Motu Patlu in Carnival Island	22 October 2015
8	Motu Patlu 36 Ghantey Race Against Time	25 December 2015
9	Motu Patlu in Alien World!	14 February 2016
10	Motu Patlu in Double Trouble	29 May 2016
11	Motu Patlu: King of Kings	14 October 2016
12	Motu Patlu the Invisible Plane	25 December 2016
13	Motu Patlu in Dragon's World	25 June 2017
14	Kung Fu Kings 3: Motu Patlu in Hong Kong	19 October 2017
15	Motu Patlu in Octopus World	24 December 2017
16	Motu Patlu in the City of Gold	29 April 2018
17	Motu Patlu Dino Invasion	24 June 2018
18	Kung Fu Kings 4: Motu Patlu and the Challenge of Kung Fu Brothers	21 October 2018
19	Motu Patlu the Superheroes vs. Supervillains from Mars	26 January 2019
20	Kung Fu Kings 5: Motu Patlu and Robo Kids	26 May 2019
21	Motu Patlu in the Game of Zones	25 December 2019
22	Motu Patlu the Superheroes vs. Alien Ghost	28 June 2020
23	Motu Patlu's Dangerous Road Trip in Switzerland	25 October 2020
24	Motu Patlu vs. Dr. Destroyer	3 January 2021
25	The Secret Mission of Motu Patlu	23 May 2021
26	Motu Patlu Planet of No Return	27 June 2021
27	Motu Patlu in Toy World	31 December 2021
28	Kung Fu Kings 6: Motu Patlu & The Secret of Devil's Heart	29 May 2022
29	Motu Patlu and the Terror of Giant Beasts	13 Nov 2022
30	Motu Patlu in Metal World	25 June 2023
31	Motu Patlu and the Race to the Diamond Valley	28 April 2024
32	Motu Patlu and Mission Kung Fu Kid	2 August 2024
33	Motu Patlu and the Rise of Zombies	31 October 2024
34	Motu Patlu and the Case of Project X	14 March 2025
35	Motu Patlu & The Mighty Magnathor	18 May 2025
36	Motu Patlu vs. the Ghost House	15 August 2025
37	Motu Patlu & The Madness of Multiverse	21 October 2025
38	Motu Patlu Ka Goa Dhamaal	3 March 2026
39	Motu Patlu in the World of Zombies	14 June 2026
40	Motu Patlu and the Mystery of Nagmani	8 November 2026

== Merchandising and promotion ==
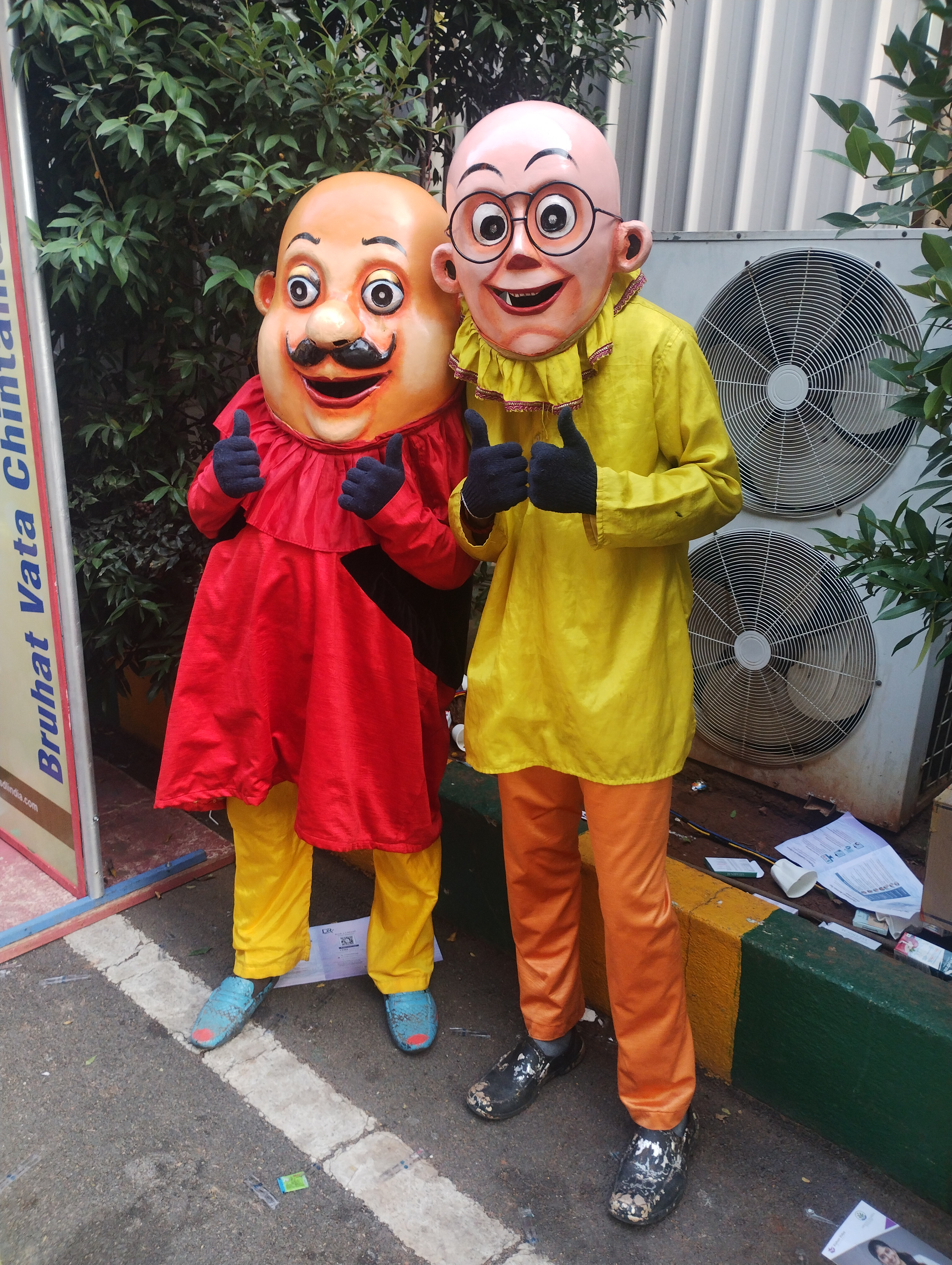
Motu Patlu cosplayers at Second Ayurveda World Summit, Palace grounds, Bengaluru (2025)

Since the inception of the television series, its creators, Lotpot magazine, Maya Digital Studios and Nickelodeon India are aggressively promoting its merchandising, the series products and tie-ups.

In March 2014, Nick India tied up with the Yellow Diamond chips brand for promotion of its products across various media. In November 2014 a major deal was signed by Horlicks for promotion of its brand with the series's characters in its marketing advertisements.

Numerous mobile video games based on the series have been released by Indian software companies such as Nazara Technologies and Tangiapps.
