= Madame Tussauds Delhi =

Wax museum in India

Noida
- Coordinates: 28°37′50″N 77°13′1″E
- Status: Closed
- Opening date: December 1, 2017 (Delhi); July 1, 2022 (Noida)
- Closing date: 2020 (Delhi); 2023 (Noida)

Ride statistics
- Attraction type: Wax Museum

Madame Tussauds Delhi was a wax museum and tourist attraction located in Delhi, India. It was the twenty-second location for the Tussauds, which was set up by French sculptor Marie Tussaud. Madame Tussauds is owned and operated by Merlin Entertainments.

On May 5, 2022, the attraction announced on its social media page that it would be relocated to DLF Mall of India, Noida as Madame Tussauds India. The Noida location closed in 2023.

== Wax Figures ==
=== Bollywood ===
Figure	Year Added	Ref.
Amitabh Bachchan	2017	
Anil Kapoor	2017	
Deepika Padukone	2018	
Diljit Dosanjh	2018	
Hrithik Roshan	2017	
Kareena Kapoor	2017	
Katrina Kaif	2017	
Shahid Kapoor	2018	
Madhubala	2017	
Madhuri Dixit	2017	
Raj Kapoor	2017	
Varun Dhawan	2019	
Ranbir Kapoor	2017	
Salman Khan	2017	
Shahrukh Khan	2018	
Sunny Leone	2018	
Anushka Sharma	2019	
Priyanka Chopra	2019	
Aishwarya Rai	2019	
Ranveer Singh	2019	

=== Hollywood ===
Figure	Year Added	Ref.
Anne Hathaway	2017	
Kate Winslet	2017	
Marilyn Monroe	2017	
Nicole Kidman	2017	
Richard Gere	2017	
Scarlett Johansson	2017	
Tom Cruise	2017	
Will Smith	2017	
Charlie Chaplin	2017	
Leonardo DiCaprio	2018	
Jennifer Aniston	2018	
Liam Hemsworth	2019	
Ryan Gosling	2019	
Dwayne Johnson	2018	
Angelina Jolie	2018	
Brad Pitt	2018	

=== Music ===
Figure	Year Added	Ref.
Asha Bhosle	2017	
Beyoncé	2018	
Jennifer Lopez	2017	
Kylie Minogue	2018	
Taylor Swift	2019	
Shawn Mendes	2019	
Ariana Grande	2018	
Justin Bieber	2017	
Lady Gaga	2017	
Madonna	2017	
Michael Jackson	2017	
Shreya Ghoshal	2017	
Sonu Nigam	2017	
Zakir Hussain	2017	

=== Sports ===
Figure	Year Added	Ref.
David Beckham	2017	
Kapil Dev	2017	
Lionel Messi	2017	
Mary Kom	2018	
Milkha Singh	2018	
Virat Kohli	2018	
Sachin Tendulkar	2018	
Serena Williams	2019	
Brian Lara	2019	
Usain Bolt	2017	

=== Animation ===
Figure	Year Added	Ref.
Motu	2020	
Patlu	2020	

=== Television ===
Figure	Year Added	Ref.
Kim Kardashian	2017	
Oprah Winfrey	2018	

=== Indian Leaders ===
Figure	Year Added	Ref.
A. P. J. Abdul Kalam	2017	
Mahatma Gandhi	2017	
Narendra Modi	2017	
Indira Gandhi	2018	
Jawaharlal Nehru	2018	
Rajiv Gandhi	2018	
Subhas Chandra Bose	2018	
Vallabhbhai Patel	2018	

== See also ==
- Madame Tussauds
- Marie Tussaud
- Merlin Entertainments
