= Inspector Chingum =

- Based on: Motu Patlu
- Country of origin: India
- Original language: Hindi
- No. of seasons: 2
- No. of episodes: 52

Production
- Running time: 22 minutes
- Production company: Cosmos Maya

Original release
- Network: Amazon Prime Video
- Release: 4 May 2018

Related
- Motu Patlu; Motu Patlu Stone Age Adventures

Inspector Chingum is an Indian 3D animated television series produced by Cosmos-Maya that premiered on 4 May 2018, on Amazon Prime Video. It is a spin-off of the show Motu Patlu.

Inspector Chingum was Cosmos-Maya's second show which premiered on online platforms before television channels, the first being Selfie with Bajrangi.

The show was televised on Hungama TV from 29 April 2019.

The series has 52 episodes across 2 seasons.

== Characters ==
- Inspector Chingum – He is the police inspector of the district 'Shantiwood'. He has a strong south Indian accent. He is often seen riding a bike. He loves his job and is a strict but extremely kind fellow. He is seen wearing a Khaki uniform for work.
- Hera and Pheri – They are the two cowardly constables who just handcuff the thieves after Inspector Chingum catches them. At times Pheri is seen to have a weak memory. This can be seen when he calls different restaurants and orders different dishes instead of ordering dosa from dosa Anna. They both wear Khaki uniforms.
- Khabrilaal – He is a friend of Inspector Chingum and can talk to animals and birds. He often helps Inspector Chingum via his agents that are spread all throughout the city.
- No baal – He is the local and main villain of the show who invades Shantiwood. He owns an institute named Crime University that train and turn people into professional criminals. He is often seen to have an intense amount of hatred for Shantiwood and Inspector Chingum and will do anything to get rid of them.
- Ek baal - He is one of the three most trusted goons of No Baal. He is the shortest among the three, but also the cleverest and most talkative one. He wears a red outfit consisting of a red shirt and pajama.
- Do baal - He is another one of the three most trusted goons of No Baal. He is taller than Ek Baal but is shorter than Teen Baal. He wears a green outfit consisting of a green shirt and pajama.
- Teen Baal - He is the tallest goon among the three most trusted goons of No Baal. He wears a blue outfit consisting of a blue shirt and pajama. He's often ignored and has the least importance among the three.
- Bozo - He is Inspector Chingum's pet dobermann dog and police dog as well. He's very intelligent and has proven himself to have an excellent physique. This is seen when in an episode, he becomes the goalkeeper for Shantiwood's football team.
- Dosa Anna - He is the man who helps Chingum at times when he's totally overwhelmed by his opponent. He cooks various types of dosa and sends it to Inspector Chingum. This gives him the power (super powers) to fight criminals.
- Dr. Bigadu - He is an evil scientist, much like the evil counterpart of Chatur, who works for No Baal. He often invents such things that wreak havoc in Shantiwood.
- Superstar Chocolate - He is the superstar of Shantiwood and a great friend to Inspector Chingum. He often enters the scene with dances and it at times helps Chingum to get past tough villains.
- Chatur - He is a friend of Inspector Chingum. He's a scientist, and he often helps Chingum by inventing really helpful things and by fixing things related to technology like finding out spy cameras, fixing robots etc.
- Mayor Jaldbole - She is Shantiwood's mayor. She does everything very slowly. Also anyone or anything who listens to her speaking slows down.
- Justick - He is Inspector Chingum's stick that's alive. He often gives valuable advice to Inspector Chingum when he's in trouble although it is in the form of proverbs.

== Locations ==
- Shantiwood – It is the district where all the characters live. It is a valley with 7 hills that hold the letters to form the word 'SHANTIWOOD'. If there is something going bad it becomes 'ASHANTIWOOD'.The word A stands before Shantiwood
- Police office – It is made out of glass and oak wood. Its interiors show one room with a table and chair.
- Tirumala Apartments – This is where Inspector Chingum and his friend lives. Chingum's room is 302 and his friend's room is 301.
- City Centre – These buildings consist of a school, hospital, fire station, and a supermarket.

== Episodes ==
=== Season 1 (2018) ===
No. overall	No. in season	Name of episode
1	1	Aakhri Raavan
2	2	5 Star Robber
3	3	Moving Paintings
4	4	Football Mein Golmaal
5	5	Rusty Gayab
6	6	Bozo Or Zobo
7	7	Invisible Man
8	8	Kohinoor Heera
9	9	Unstoppable Train
10	10	Speedo
11	11	Crying Bird
12	12	Sapera
13	13	Helicopter Ride
14	14	Robin Hooda
15	15	Bhool Gava Sub Kuch
16	16	Bade Chhote
17	17	Bhopu Topu
18	18	Robot Statue
19	19	Sukdu Pehlwan
20	20	Bubbly Bubbly Boo
21	21	Belt Trouble
22	22	Superstar Chocolate ka Kidnap
23	23	Bike Out of Control
24	24	Mad Hammer
25	25	Monkey Training
26	26	Hera ki Shaadi

=== Season 2 (2018) ===
No. overall	No. in season	Name of episode
27	1	Chorepati Chor
28	2	Horse Patrolling
29	3	Hasna Mana Hai
30	4	Happy Birthday Chingum
31	5	Golden Pearl
32	6	Transmit
33	7	Asli Nakli
34	8	Shadow Control
35	9	Sticky Car
36	10	Laughing Chingum
37	11	Santa in Trouble
38	12	Dinogame
39	13	Sumo Sossa
40	14	Shantiwood Ki Happy Diwali
41	15	Chicken Toofani
42	16	Holi Hai Bhai Holi Hai
43	17	Chingum ka Daar
44	18	Dragon Kite
45	19	Donation Box
46	20	Robotic Bat
47	21	Dragon Attack
48	22	Khabrilal Ka Brain Damage
49	23	Maharaja Chingum
50	24	Dil Dimag Pe Bhari
51	25	Alien Story
52	26	Tel Ka Khel

== Reception ==
"In addition to the classic "Bollywoodisque" style of storytelling that the studio is known for, Inspector Chingum also features rap songs by popular Indian rap artist, Baba Sehgal. Every episode will have a special song which is going to be the highlight of the series.", noted Animation Express. Other commentators also noted the prominence of funk and rap music in the spin-off.

== See also ==
- List of Indian animated television series
- Motu Patlu
- Singham (film series), the film series the character is based on/parodies
