= Mayapuri (magazine) =

Hindi film magazine

- Type: Weekly
- Founder: Anand Prakash Baja
- Founded: October 1882; 143 years ago
- Language: English and Hindi
- Website: mayapuri.com/en (in English)

Mayapuri is the oldest and largest circulated Hindi magazine weekly in India, with a circulation figure of over 3,40,000 per week and a readership of 30,60,000. It was first published in 1974 by the publication group also known by the same name i.e. Mayapuri Group.

== Mayapuri Group ==
Mayapuri Group of publications began in 1882 in Lahore, the capital of undivided Punjab by the name of Arorbans Press. The group later shifted its head office to Delhi. After partition, the torchbearer of this group, A.P Bajaj, took the group to new heights by making innovations in the field of media by expanding his printing facilities and successfully launching his first children's magazine Lotpot.

== Mayapuri magazine ==
In 1974, the Mayapuri Group launched the first weekly Hindi film magazine Mayapuri of India. It has been one of the most popular Hindi magazines in the northern Hindi belt of India, covering Bollywood film-gossip. Mayapuri also finds mention in the 2008 Bollywood film Ghajini and the popular Star One teen drama series Miley Jab Hum Tum. One could find this Mayapuri magazine at any barber shop in India. Some of the old issues from 1970–80s are considered vintage.

== English Version ==
An english version was created called Bollyy.
