= Second Ayurveda World Summit, Bangalore =

Second Ayurveda World Summit, Bangalore Ayurveda World Summit, Bangalore

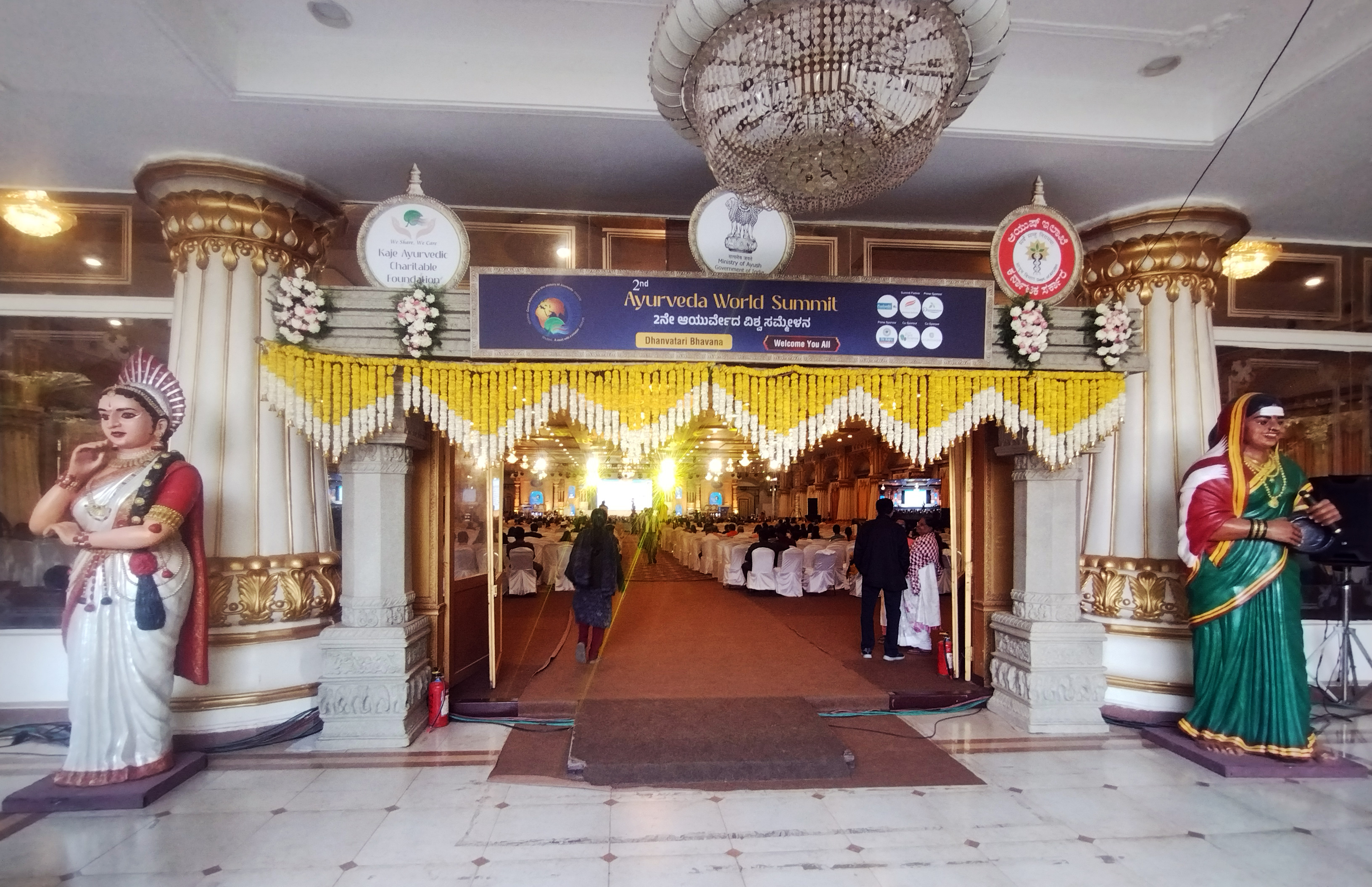
- Official entrance of the summit at The Royal Senate & The Grand Castle, Palace Grounds, Bangalore
- Host country: India
- Date: 25 to 28 December 2025
- Motto: A meet with a mission
- Cities: Bangalore
- Venues: Palace grounds
- Participants: Ayurveda priests, students, doctors, stores
- Website: ayurvedaworldsummit.com

The second edition of Ayurveda World Summit was held in Palace grounds, Bangalore, from 25 to 28 December 2025. It was organized by Kaje Ayurvedic Chartable Foundation, Ministry of Ayush.

== Media gallery ==
Second Ayurveda World Summit, Bangalore (2025)
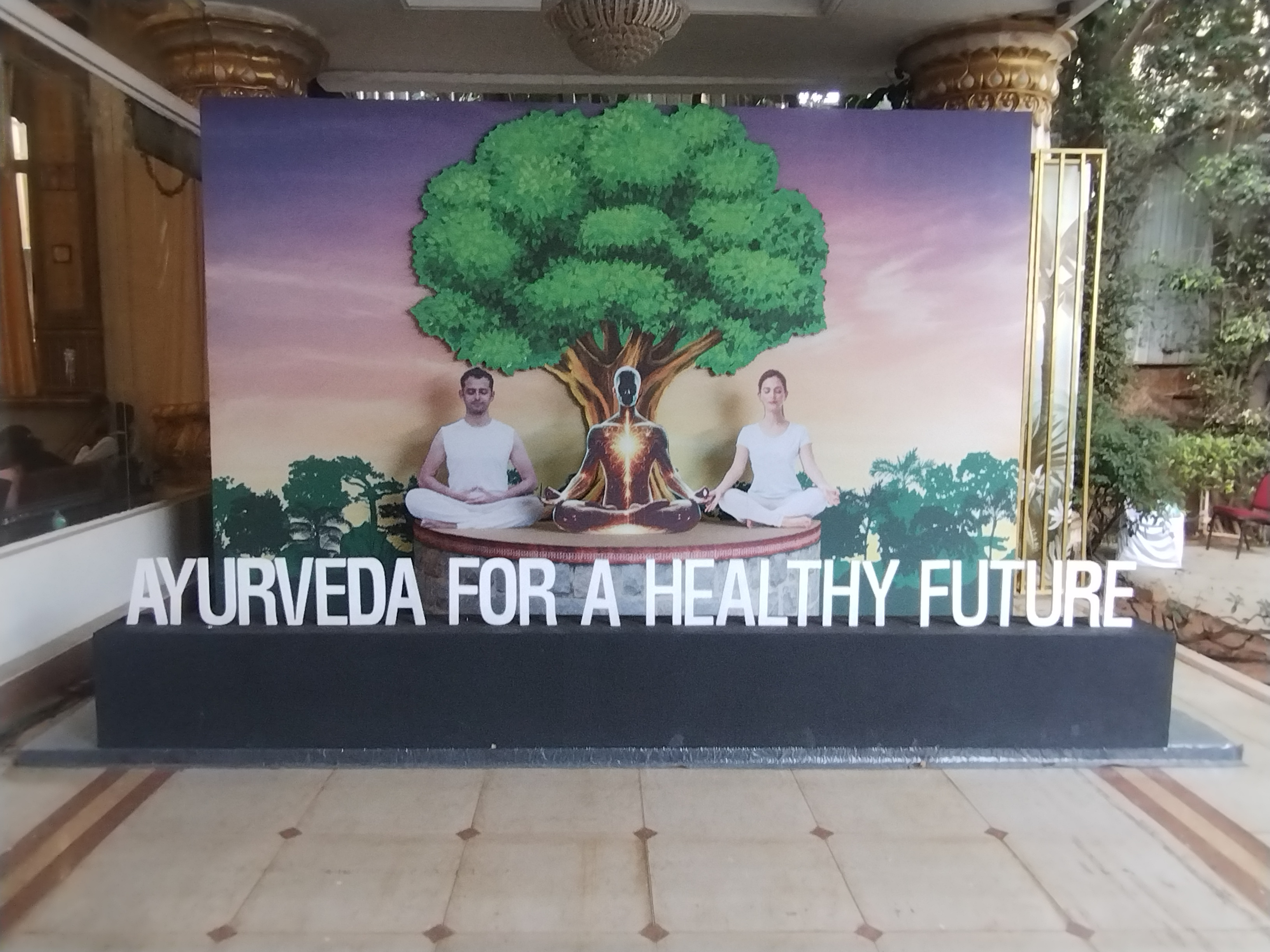
Ayurveda signboard

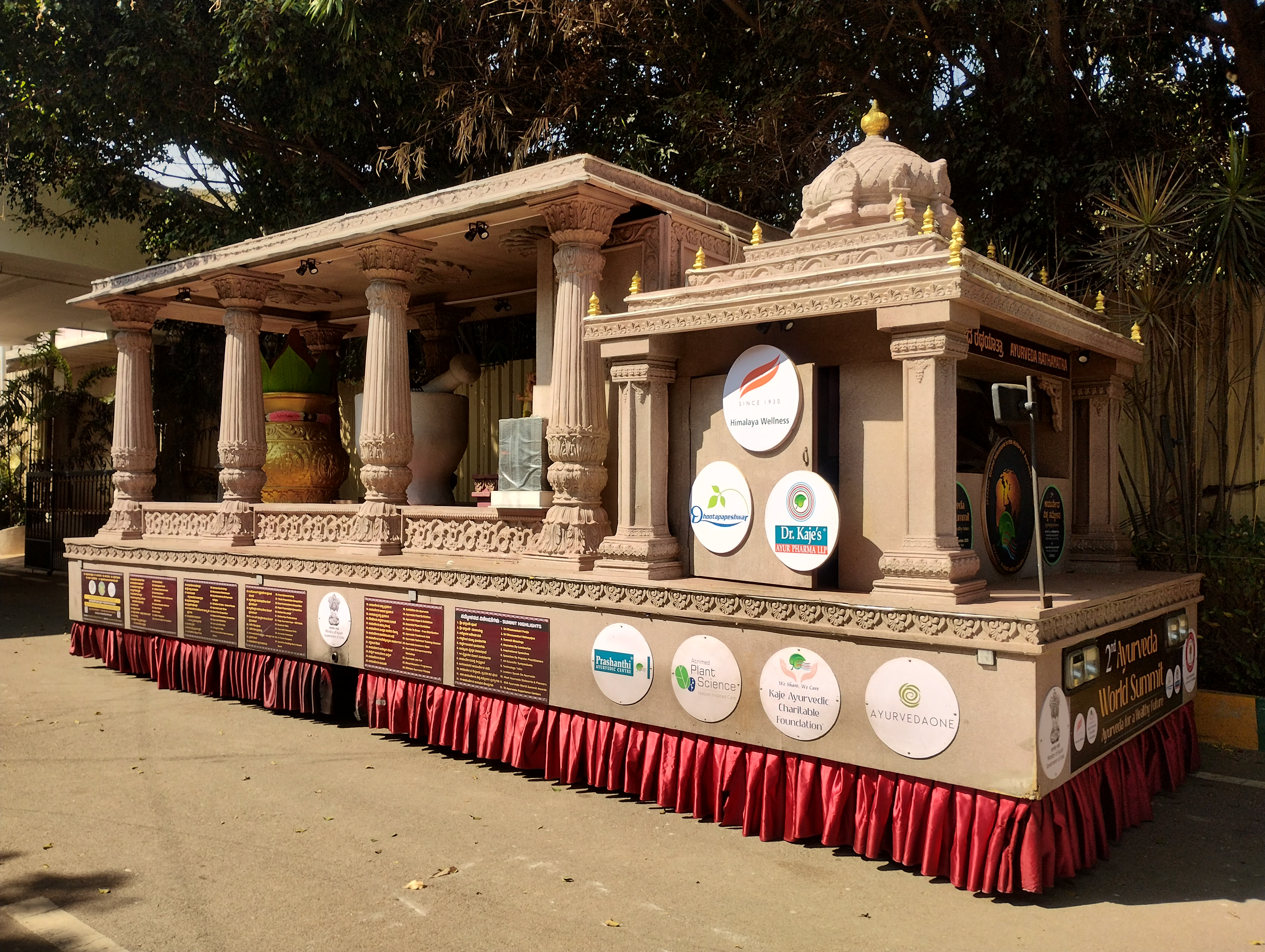
Dhanvantari Ratha Yatra at the summit

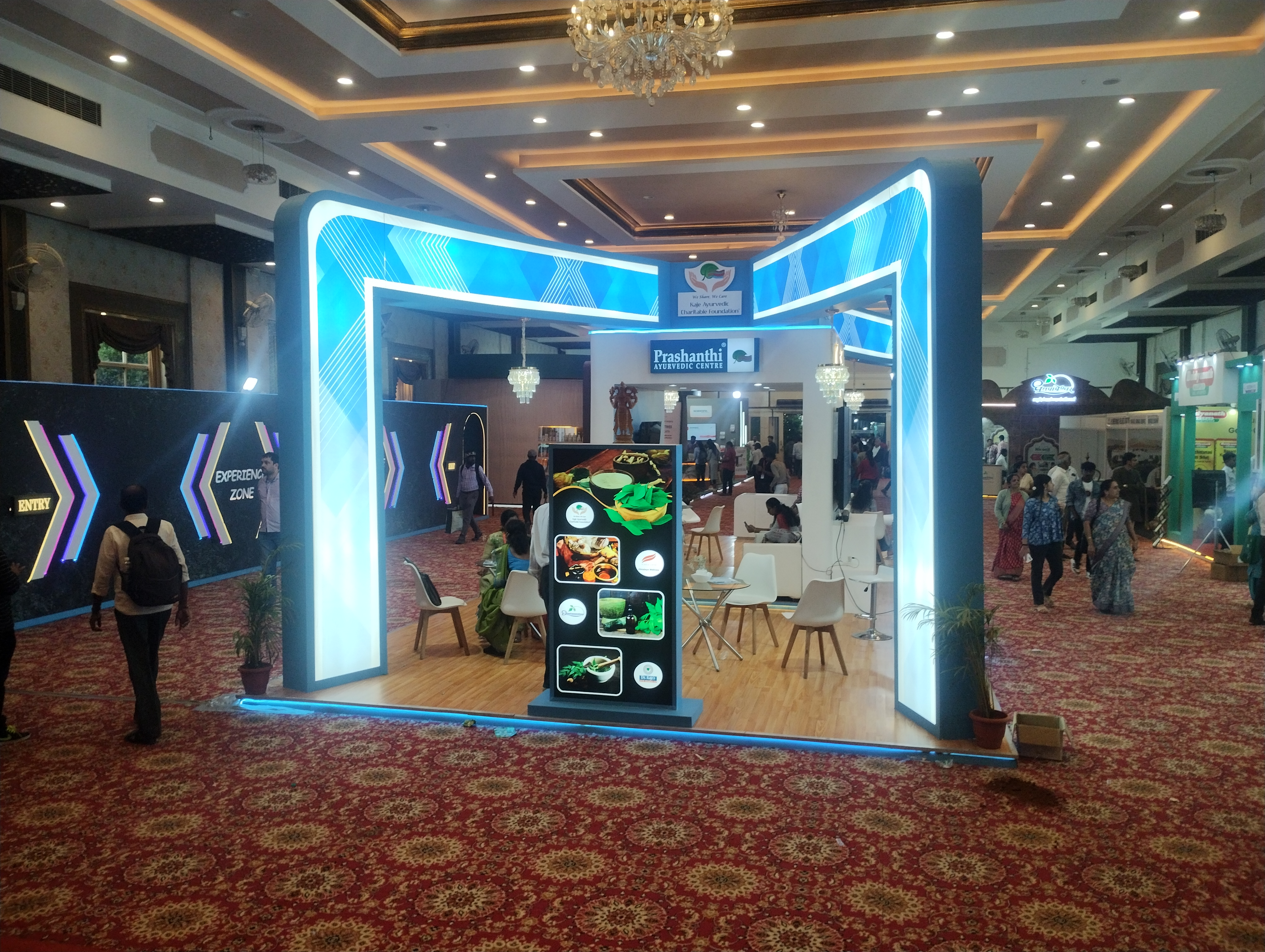
Exhibitor and organizer Kaje Ayurvedic Chartable Foundation

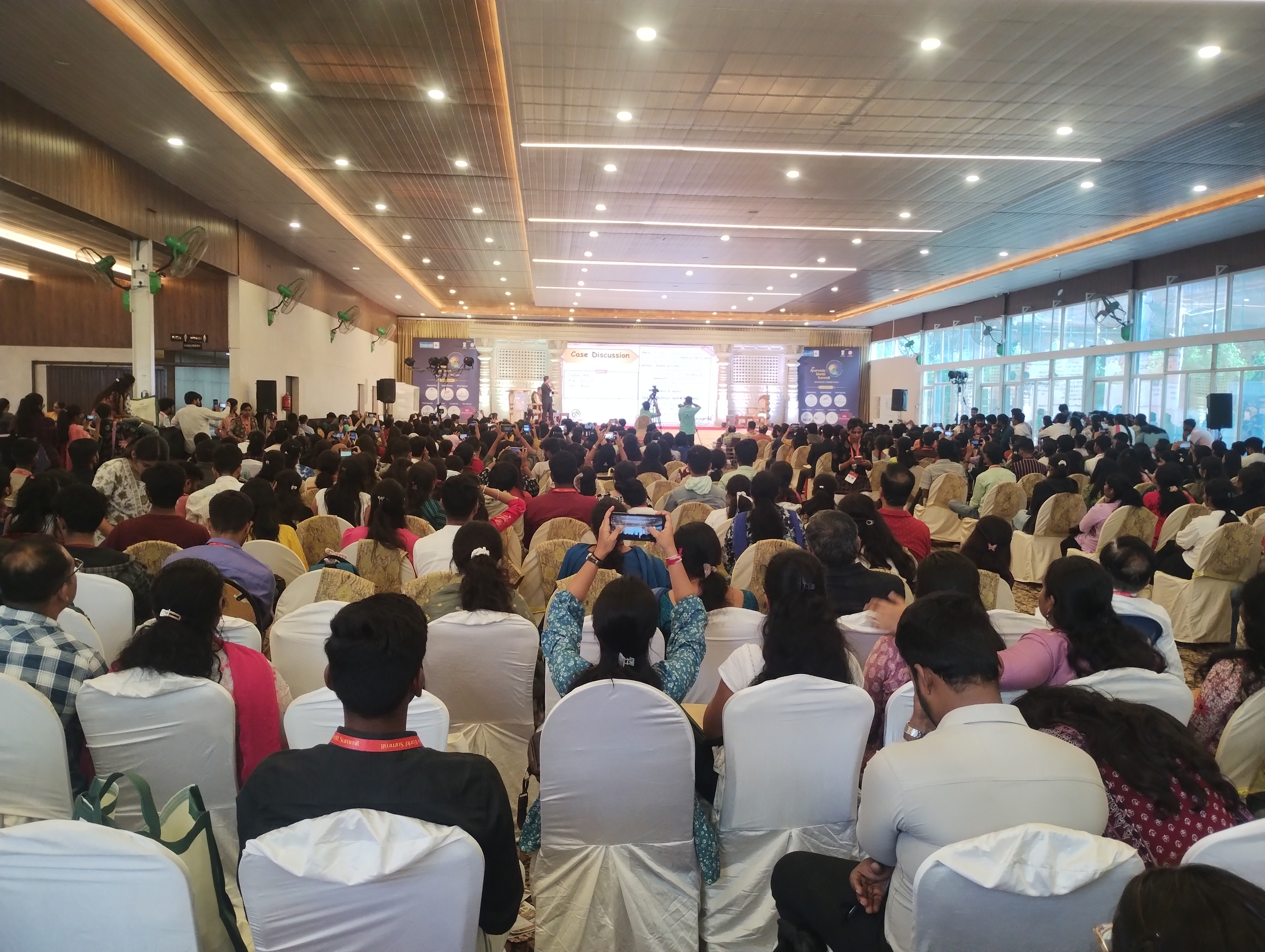
Conferences

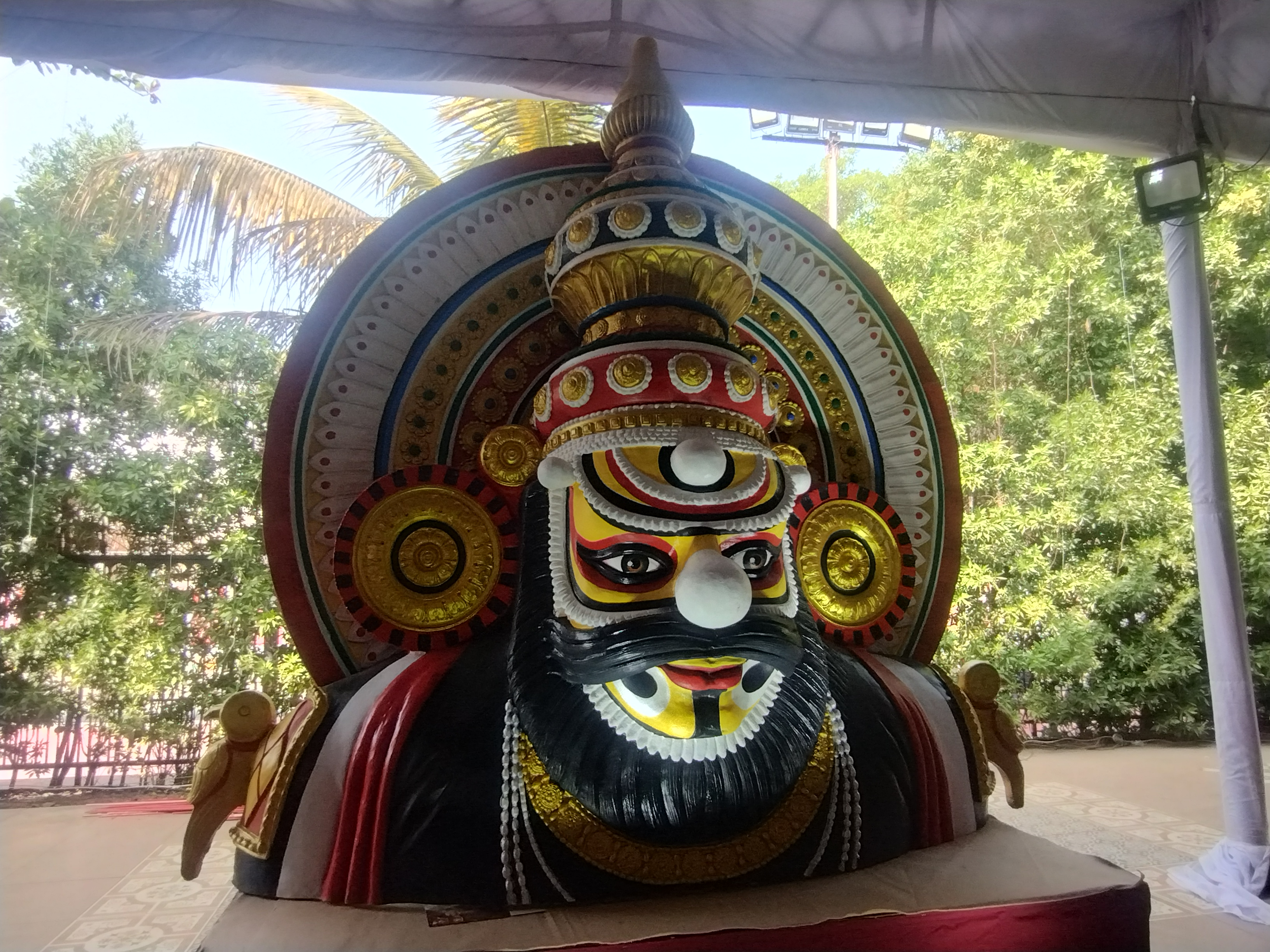
Sculptures

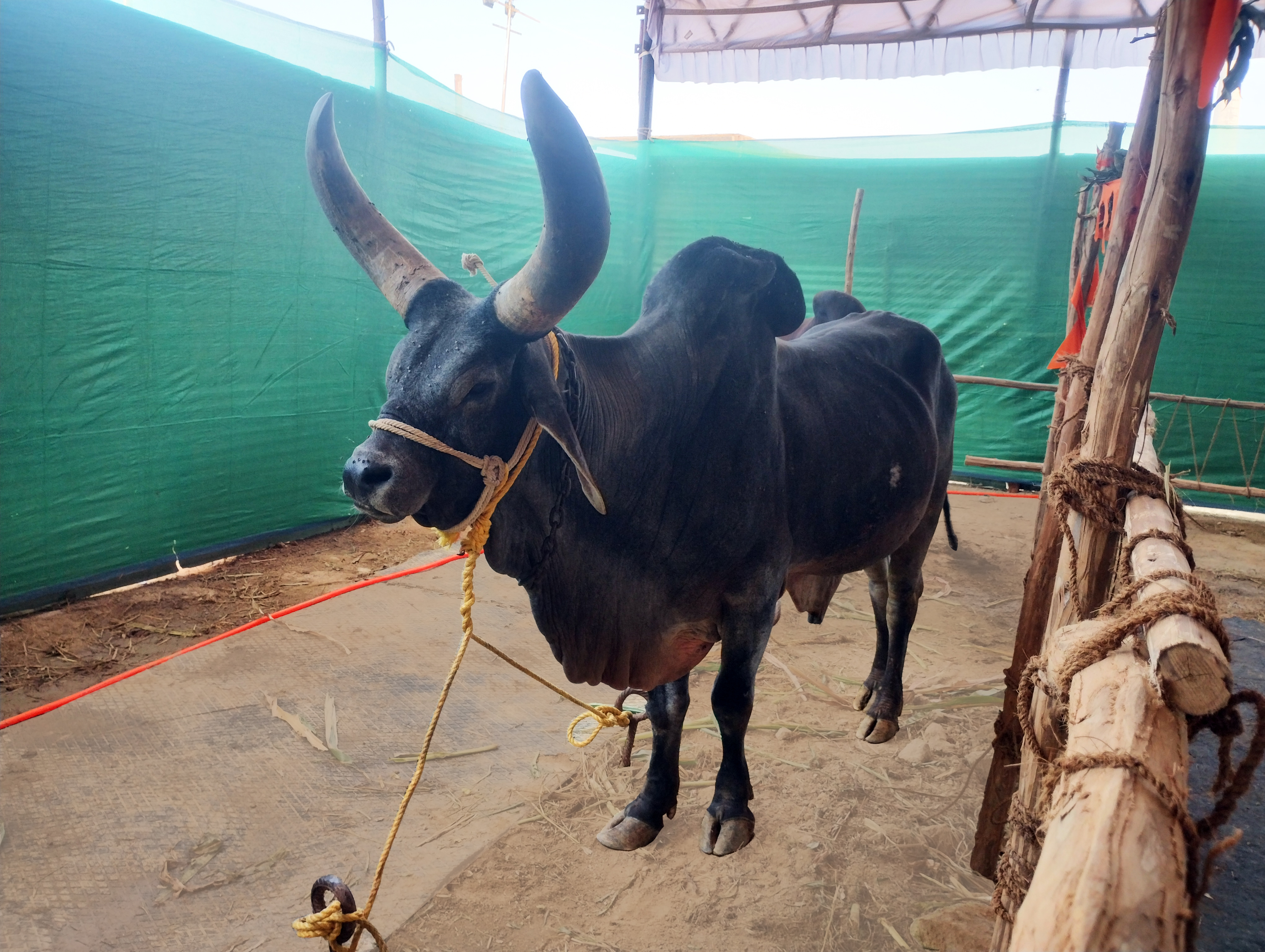
Cattle
