= List of Indian animated television series =

This is a list of animated television series produced in India. (this list does not include Western cartoons that are outsourced to India; example: Mickey Mouse Clubhouse (DQ Entertainment) & Megamind Rules! (88 Pictures)).

== Series ==
Series	Network	Production company	Original run	Refs
Adventures of Chhota Birbal	Cartoon Network	Climb Media	2003–2004	
Akbar Birbal	Cartoon Network	Phobeus Media	2006	
Akki Jaanbaaz	Gubbare	Toonz Animation	2021	
Amader Thakurmar Jhuli	Sony Aath	Ssoftoons	2024–present	
Amar Chitra Katha	Cartoon Network; ZeeQ	ACK Media	2010	
Andy Pirki	Pogo TV	AUM Animation Studios	2017–2018	
Animals of Mythology	Epic		2018–2020	
Appu – The Yogic Elephant	Pogo TV	Appu Series	2016–2017	
Arjun – Prince of Bali	Disney Channel India	Green Gold Animations	2014–2016	
Astra Force	Disney Channel India	Graphic India	2016–2017	
Bunty Billa aur Babban	Discovery Kids India	Toonz Media Group	2022–present	
Baahubali: The Lost Legends	Amazon Prime Video	Arka Media Works; Graphic India	2017–present	
Baahubali: Crown of Blood	Disney+ Hotstar	Arka Media Works; Graphic India	2024	
Bal Chanakya	Maha Cartoon TV	DV Group	2016	
Bandbudh Aur Budbak	ZeeQ	Paperboat Animation Studio	2015–present	
Bapu	Disney Channel India	Cosmos-Maya	2020–present	
Bantul the Great	Zee Bangla	Animatrix Multimedia	2014	
Bhaagam Bhaag	Disney Channel India	Cosmos Maya	2019–2023	
Bhootu	Zee Bangla	Animatrix Multimedia	2017	
Bunty Aur Billy	Hungama TV	Toonz Animation	2015–2016	
Bongo	DD National	Green Gold Animations	2004–2006	
Bommi & Friends	International syndication	Gusto Studios	2016	
Bujji and Bhairava	Amazon Prime Video	Green Gold Animations	2024	
Chander Buri O Magic Man	Zee Bangla	Animatrix Multimedia	2008	
Chacha Bhatija	Hungama TV	Cosmos Maya	2016–present	
Chai Chai	Hungama TV	Toonz Animation	2016	
Chacha Chaudhary	Disney Channel India	Toonz Animation India	2019	
Chamki Ki Duniya	Pogo TV	Sesame Workshop India	2014–2016	
Chhota Bheem	Pogo TV	Green Gold Animations	2008–present	
Chhoti Anandi	Colors TV	Sphere Origins; HopMotion Animation Studio	2016	
Chimpoo Simpoo	ZeeQ	Digitales Studio	2016–2017	
Chorr Police	Disney XD India	Green Gold Animations	2009–2012	
Chikoo Aur Bunty	Nickelodeon India	Hitech Studio	2021	
Ciko se Sikho	Maha Cartoon TV	DV Group	2016	
Crime Time	Cartoon Network India	Future Thought Productions	2008–2009	
Dabangg: The Animated Series	Cartoon Network India	Arbaaz Khan Productions; Cosmos Maya	2021	
Danpite Khadu Aar Tar Chemical Dadu	DD Bangla	Ssoftoons	2004	
Eena Meena Deeka	Hungama TV	Cosmos Maya	2015–2017	
Ek Tha Jungle (Indian Fables)	Disney Channel India	Karadi Tales; Accel Animation Studios	2010–2011	
Ekans : Ek Se Badhkar Snake	Cartoon Network; Pogo TV	Hi-tech Animation	2021	
Fab5 Mission Tango	Sony Yay		2017–2019	
Fatak Patak	Marvel HQ	Nihodo Media	2017	
Fukrey Boyzzz	Discovery Kids	Paperboat Design Studios	2019–present	
Gadget Guru Ganesha	Disney Channel India	Cosmos-Maya	2020–present	
Gaju Bhai	Disney Channel India	Toonz Animation	2016–2018	
Gattu Battu	Nickelodeon India; Nickelodeon Sonic	Toonz Animation	2017–2020	
Gini Zindabad	Zee Bangla	Fourth Dimension Visual Effects Pvt Ltd	2015–2016	
Ghayab Aya	DD National	Studio IFEKT	1986	
Golmaal Jr.	Nickelodeon Sonic (2019–2020), (2022-2024); Nickelodeon India (2020–2021)	Reliance Entertainment; Rohit Shetty Picturez	2019–present	
Gopal Bhar	Sony Aath	Ssoftoons	2015–present	
Guddu the Great	Hungama TV	Cosmos Maya	2019–present	
Gulte Mama	Sony Aath	Animatrix Multimedia	2023–present	
Guru Aur Bhole	Sony Yay	Cosmos Maya	2017–present	
Howzzattt	Disney XD India	Toonz Animation	2012	
Hum Chik Bum	Hungama TV	Afternoon Films	2015–2017	
Indian Folk Tales	Splash	Pentamedia Graphics	2001–2002	
Inspector Chingum	Hungama TV	Cosmos Maya	2018–present	
It's AumSum Time	YouTube	AumSum	2014–present	
J Bole Toh Jadoo	Nickelodeon India	Graphiti Multimedia	2004–2005	
Jungle Tales	Cartoon Network India	Moving Pictures Company	2004	
Jungle Tales with Mowgli	Disney Channel	JioStar India	2026	
Kalari Kids	Amazon Prime Video	Green Gold Animations	2017–2019	
Kalpopurer Galpo	Sony Aath	Ssoftoons	2023–present	*
Keymon Ache	Nickelodeon India; Nickelodeon Sonic	DQ Entertainment	2011–present	
Kicko & Super Speedo	Sony Yay	Green Gold Animations	2018–2019	
Kid Krrish	Cartoon Network	Toonz Animation; Film Kraft Productions; Turner International India	2013–2015	
Kisna	Discovery Kids India	Cosmos Maya	2014–2017	
Krishna	Cartoon Network	Green Gold Animations	2006–2007	
Krishna Balram	Cartoon Network	Green Gold Animations	2008–2010	
Krish Trish and Baltiboy	Cartoon Network	Children's Film Society India	2010	
Kuku Mey Mey	Toon Goggles	Hopmotion Animation Studio	2018	
Kumbh Karan	Pogo TV	Cornershop Animation	2010–2012	
Lamput	Cartoon Network India	Vaibhav Studios	2017–present	
Little Krishna	Discovery Kids India	Reliance Entertainment	2009	
Little Singham	Discovery Kids India (2018-2022); Pogo (2022-present)	Reliance Entertainment; Rohit Shetty Picturez	2018–present	
Lok Gatha	DD National	Climb Media	1991	
Luv Kushh	Disney XD India	Green Gold Animations	2012–2014	
Mahabharata	Sony Aath	Animatrix Multimedia	2016	
Meena	DD National	UNICEF; Hanna-Barbera	1993	
Mighty Raju	Pogo TV	Green Gold Animations	2015–2019	
Mighty Little Bheem	Netflix	Green Gold Animation	2019–present	
Mooshak Gungun	Maha Cartoon TV	DV Group	2016	
Motu Patlu	Nickelodeon India	Cosmos Maya	2012–present	
Mysteries and Feluda	Disney XD India	DQ Entertainment	2011	
Nandu Apna	DD National	Manorama Music; Bijaybawa Productions	2003	
Ninja Nontu	Cartoon Network India	Nihodo Media	2014	
NIX – Je Sob Pare	Sony Aath	Animatrix Multimedia	2017	
Nut Boltu	Sony Aath		2016	
Oye Golu	Disney Channel India	Popcorn Animation Studios	2019	
P5 – Pandavas 5	Disney XD India	Rudra Matsa Entertainment	2011–2012	
Paap-O-Meter	Sony Yay	Ssoftoons	2017–present	
Pakdam Pakdai (Rat-a-Tat)	Nickelodeon India (2013–2014; 2017–2018); Nickelodeon Sonic (2014–2020; 2022–present)	Toonz Animation	2013–present	
Panchatantram	ETV (Telugu)	Usha Kiran Television	2003–2007	
Panchatantra Stories	Maha Cartoon TV	DV Group	2016	
Panchotantrer Montro	Sony Aath		2017–2019	
Pinaki & Happy - The Bhoot Bandhus	Nickelodeon Sonic	Tavrohi Animations	2020–present	
Pot Pourri	Splash	Pentamedia Graphics	2001–2002	
Prince Jai aur Dumdaar Viru	Sony Yay	Phobeus Media	2017–2019	
Pyaar Mohabbat Happy Lucky	ZeeQ	Popcorn Animation Studios	2015–2017	
Raju The Rickshaw	International syndication	Accel Animation Studios	2009	
Robin Hood: Mischief in Sherwood	International syndication	DQ Entertainment; Method Animation	2016	
Roll No 21	Cartoon Network India	Animasia Studio	2010–present	
Rudra: Boom Chik Chik Boom	Nickelodeon India	Green Gold Animations	2018–present	
Sab Jholmaal Hai	Sony Yay	Toonz Animation	2017–present	
Selfie With Bajrangi	Amazon Prime Video (2017–2018); Disney+ Hotstar (2020–)	Cosmos Maya	2017–present	
Shaktimaan: The Animated Series	Nickelodeon Sonic	Reliance Entertainment; Paperboat Animation Studio	2011–2012	
Sheikh Chilli and Friendz	Discovery Kids India	Irealities Technology	2016–2017	
Shiva	Nickelodeon India (2015–2016) (2018–2021); Nickelodeon Sonic (2016–2018); Nickelodeon India (2021–present)	Cosmos Maya; Hi-Tech Animation	2015–present	
Smashing Simmba	Pogo TV	Reliance Animation	2020–present	
Singhasan Battisi	Pogo TV	Shethia Audio and Video	2011–2012	
Simple Samosa	Disney Channel India	Ice Candy	2018	
Sontu O Kakababu	Ruposhi Bangla	Ssoftoons	2010–2011	
Super V	Star India; Disney India	Cornerstone Animation; Star India	2019	
Suppandi Suppandi! The Animated Series	Cartoon Network	ACK Media	2012	
Super Bheem	Pogo TV	Green Gold Animations	2017–2020	
Suraj: The Rising Star	Colors TV	KODANSHA Inc. TMS Entertainment; DQ Entertainment	2012–2013	
Taarak Mehta Kka Chhota Chashmah	Sony Yay	Neela Tele Films	2021–present	
Tenida	Zee Bangla	Animatrix Multimedia	2007–2008	
Thakurmar Jhuli	Zee Bangla	Dawsen Infotech	2003–2008	
The Adventures of King Vikram	Disney XD		2012–2014	
The Adventures of Tenali Raman	Cartoon Network India	Toonz Animation	2003–2004	
The Jungle Book	International syndicate	DQ Entertainment; MoonScoop Group; Ellipsanime; ZDF Enterprises	2010–2020	
The Legend of Hanuman	Disney+ Hotstar	Graphic India	2021	
The New Adventures of Hanuman	Pogo TV; Cartoon Network	Percept Picture Company	2010–2011	
The Pandavas	Pogo	Hi-tech Animation	2022	
Ting Tong	Nickelodeon India; Nickelodeon Sonic	Fable Spinners Studio	2020–present	
Tik Tak Tail	Pogo TV; Cartoon Network	Cosmos Maya	2017–2019	
Titoo	Pogo TV	Cosmos Maya	2020–present	
Vartmaan	DD National	Climb Media	1994–1995	
ViR: The Robot Boy	Hungama TV	Cosmos Maya	2013–2016	
V 4 Viraat	Disney Channel India	Toonz Animation	2016	
Surya	Disney Channel India	Shrishti India	2017	
Yom	Disney Channel	Graphiti Multimedia	2017	The sisters

== See also ==
- Indian animation industry
- List of Indian animated films
