= Sate klatak =

Indonesian goat meat dish

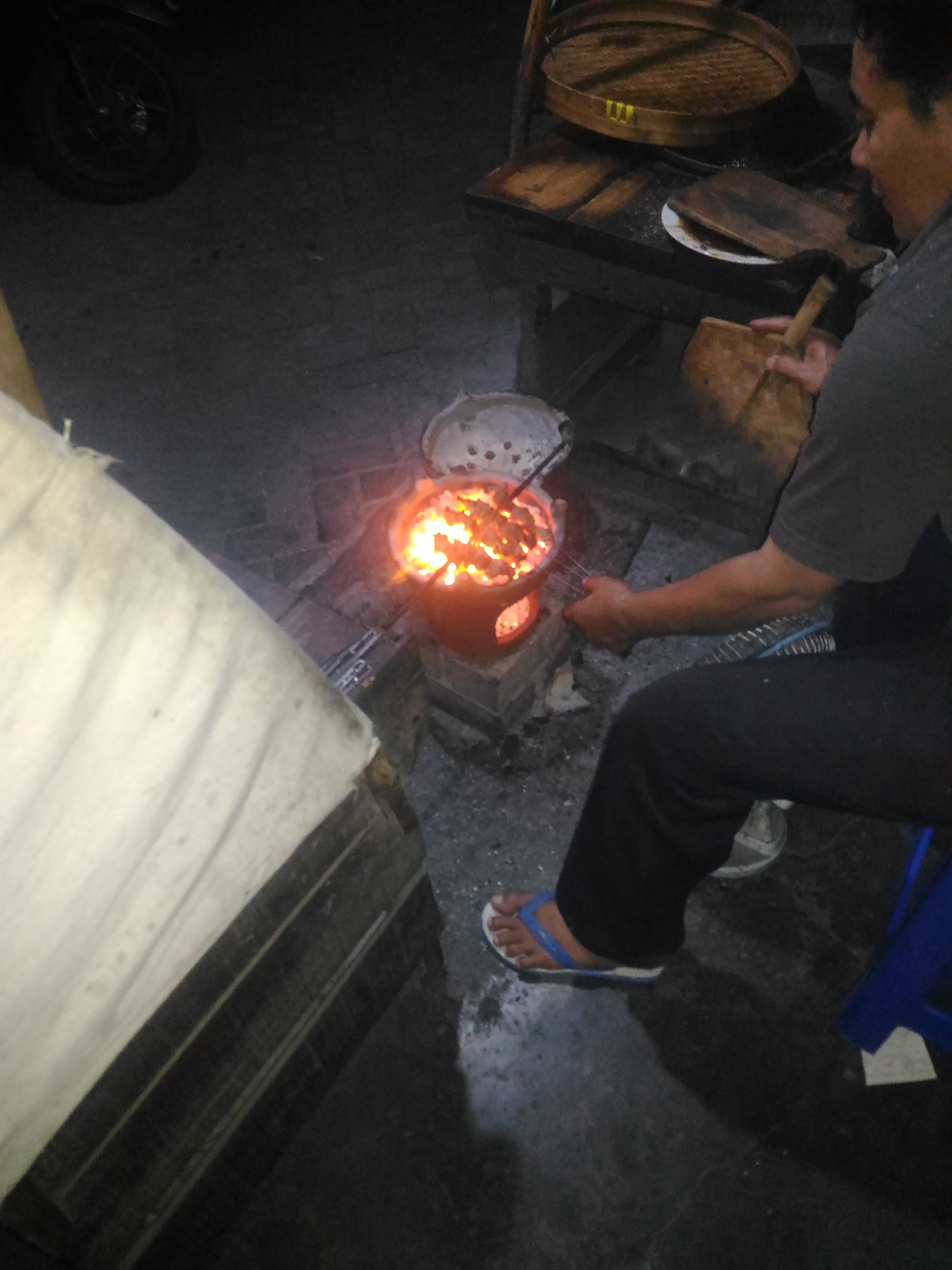
- Sate klatak being cooked
- Course: Main course
- Place of origin: Indonesia
- Region or state: Yogyakarta
- Serving temperature: Hot
- Main ingredients: goat or mutton, gulai

Sate klatak is a unique goat or mutton satay dish, originally from Pleret District, Bantul Regency in Yogyakarta. In Javanese, the act of roasting satay in an open fire is called "klathak".

This satay is quite different from other variants of satay, in that it uses mainly salt and a pinch of pepper as its main marinating seasoning. The skewers used to grill or roast the satay are made from iron, unlike other satays which use bamboo skewers. The iron skewers act as heat conductors and help the meat cook evenly from the inside.

The satay is usually served with gulai (curry soup). The gulai is richly spiced, sometimes cooked with lamb bone, and boiled using a small fire for approx. 30 minutes.

== See also ==
- Indonesian cuisine
- Javanese cuisine
- Satay
- Sate kambing
