= Gopal Bhar (disambiguation) =

Gopal Bhar may refer to:

- Gopal Bhar, a Medieval Bengali jester
- Gopal Bhar (TV series), an Indian Bengali-language animated TV series by Ssoftoons
