= Kumbha (disambiguation) =

A kumbha is a type of pottery in India.

Kumbha may also refer to:

- Kumbha Mela or Kumbh Mela, a Hindu festival and pilgrimage in India
  - Prayag Kumbh Mela, the festival in Prayagraj, India
- Kumbha of Mewar (r. 1433–1468), ruler of Mewar kingdom in India
- Kumbha Ram Arya, Indian politician from Rajasthan
- Kumbha (month), month in the Indian solar calendar
- Kumbha, the water-bearer sign in Hindu astrology
- Kumbha, a month in the Darian calendar
- Kumbha Express, Indian railways passenger train

== See also ==
- Kumbhakarana, character in the ancient Indian epic Ramayana
- Kumbh Karan, Indian children's animated TV show
