= Maha Cartoon TV =

- Maha Cartoon TV logo
- Country: India
- Broadcast area: India
- Network: Maha TV
- Affiliates: Maha Movie
- Headquarters: New Delhi, India

Programming
- Language: Hindi
- Picture format: 4:3 (576i, SDTV)

Ownership
- Owner: Teleone Consumers Product Private Ltd

History
- Launched: 1 November 2016; 8 years ago
- Closed: 1 March 2019
- Replaced by: Maha Punjabi

Maha Cartoon TV was a cable and satellite television channel that is owned by Teleone Consumers Product Pvt. Ltd. It was founded by Darshan Singh and Vishvajeet Sharma. The channel was launched on 1 November 2016. The channel is primarily aimed at children and adolescents aged 4–14 free-to-air channel. It was replaced by Maha Punjabi in 2019.

== History ==
Teleone Consumers Private Ltd came into existence in 1998 and is the parent company of Maha Cartoon TV. Maha Cartoon TV carries the franchise title that was incepted with the precursor channel Maha Movie. According to the official press release, the channel was created to fill the idle space for a Hindi free-to-air channel.

== Programming ==
Maha Cartoon TV’s current schedule consists largely of original series aimed at children and pre-teens. The shows that air on the channel are:

- Mooshak Gungun
- Bal Chanakya
- Panchatantra Stories
- Akbar & Birbal
- Ciko se Sikho
- Techno Kids

The channel also airs a variety of foreign content, including

- Plantimon – A Journey of an Adventure
- Super Ninjas
- Bali: The Jungle Warrior
- Sooryanagar Ke Saahasi
- Charlie Chaplin show
- Doraemon
- Pokémon
- Rubi
- Alien Zoo
- Samson and Neon (Samson et Néon)
- KungFu Dragon
- Abu: The Little Dinosaur
- Professor Thompson
- Raven Tales
- The Dream Town
- Ejen Ali

The channel has a future plan to air movies.
