= C.I.D. Kolkata Bureau =

Indian Bengali-language crime detective television Show

- Genre: Crime Fiction; Suspense
- Created by: B. P. Singh
- Directed by: B. P. Singh
- Starring: Sudip Mukherjee; Kaushik Chakraborty; Joy Bhattacharya; Biplab Banerjee; Tribikram Ghosh; Partha Pratim Dutta; Arindam Saha; Aatish Bhattacharya; Sanjukta Das; Debashree Chakraborty; Paulami Banerjee
- Country of origin: India
- Original language: Bengali
- No. of episodes: 135 (list of episodes)

Production
- Producers: B. P. Singh; Pradeep Uppoor
- Production locations: West Bengal, Kolkata, India
- Running time: 42–45 minutes approx.
- Production company: Fireworks Productions

Original release
- Network: Sony Aath
- Release: 12 November 2012 – 12 July 2014

Related
- CID

CID Kolkata Bureau is a Bengali crime detective television series in which Sudip Mukherjee plays the central role as the Senior ACP and the chief of the CID team who pursue criminals through detailed investigation. Launched in November 2012, it is a spin-off of the Hindi TV series CID.

== Cast ==
=== Main cast ===
- Sudip Mukherjee as ACP Ekalavya
- Kaushik Chakraborty as ACP Bir Singha
- Joy Bhattacharya as Senior Inspector Ronojoy
- Biplab Banerjee as Dr. Arrow
- Tribikram Ghosh as Sub-Inspector Tej
- Partha Pratim Dutta as Sub-Inspector Satyaki
- Aatish Bhattacharya as Inspector Indrajit
- Sanjukta Das as Sub-Inspector Damini
- Debashree Chakraborty as Inspector Gargi
- Paulami Banerjee as Inspector Jaggyaseni
- Arindam Saha Played Antagonist (Villain).
- B. P. Singh as DCP Shamsher Singh Chitrole

=== Episodic appearance ===
- Arindam Saha Main central villain and negative characters played in maximum stories of episodes.
- Debjoy Mallick as
  - Amit - A Gangster.
  - Barun - A Criminal.
  - Chayan
- Sabyasachi Chakrabarty as Amal Som - A Detective.
- Om Sahani as Arjun Singha - Amal's student.
- Judhajit Banerjee as Bhaskar Dutta - A women trafficking mafia
- Tanushree Goswami as Shweta
- Gora Dhar as Drug Dealer
- Ankush Hazra as Himself
- Nusrat Jahan as Herself
- Subhashree Ganguly as Herself
- Sanchari Mondal as Sreetama - An Actress.
- Sankar Sanku Chakrabarty as
  - Ashok - A criminal
  - Hrishikesh Roy Barman - A Gangster.
- Madhumita Chakrabarty as Shyamoli - A Criminal
- Sreetama Roy Chowdhury as Shima
- Prerona Bhattacharya as Chitra Mitra
- Amrita Mallick
