= Nut Boltu =

Indian animated TV series

- Title card
- Genre: Comedy
- Country of origin: India
- Original language: Bengali
- No. of seasons: 11
- No. of episodes: 1,032

Production
- Running time: 17-23 minutes
- Production company: Ssoftoons

Original release
- Network: Sony Aath
- Release: 2016 – present

Nut Boltu is an Indian Bengali language animated comedy television series. In 2016 the series began airing regularly on the Sony Aath television channel.

== Plot ==
Nut Boltu series is based on the life and activities of two boys named Nut and Boltu, who are around 10 years old living in the town "Daspara" studying in "N.B.School". Nut is fat and Boltu is skinny. They had a friend Chimti, the niece of Gopi Daroga, the inspector of the Daspara Police Station from later episodes. They are a bit mischievous, but stand by each other in good and bad times, when they clash with their rival party whom appears to cause harm to them. They always volunteer, being the active members of the "Chirantani Club" to solve the problems of others, but because of their personality and unique thinking, they always get into some trouble. Finally their friendship, honesty and trust helps to solve all the problems.

== Characters ==
- Nut: The central character, a healthy and intelligent boy. His complexion is light brown. He wears pale green T-shirt, orange pant and blue shoes most of the time, studies at Daspara 'N.B.' School.
- Boltu: Nut's friend studies at the same school. The second central character with thin health, wears purple T-shirt, khaki pant and pink shoes most of the time.
- Borobabu: Gopi Daroga, Inspector of Dashpara Police Station.
- S.P. Sir: The strict officer senior to Borobabu.
- Havildar: The only Constable of Dashpara Police Station.
- Rajani Babu: Nut's father. Member of Chirantani Club.
- Nut's mother: a strict and hard woman with a healthy figure, friend of Boltu's mother.
- Makhon Babu: Boltu's father. Member of Chirantani Club.
- Boltu's mother: Same as Nut's mother.
- Wrench: Ratan Chacchari, the head of Nut and Boltu's rival partys, studies at Dashpara 'N.B.' School.
- Wrench's mother: The strict mother of Ratan Chacchari
- Hulo: Wrench's assistant, member of Nut and Boltu's rival party. Mittir aunty's sister's son, studies at Dashpara 'N.B.' School from his aunt's house.
- Batali: Wrench's assistant, member of Nut and Boltu's rival party. Mittir aunty's sister's son and Hulo's brother, studies at the same school from the same place.
- Bheblai: Wrench, Hulo and Batali's assistant, member of Nut and Boltu's rival party, studies at the same School.
- Chimti: Nut and Boltu's friend (female), niece of Borobabu. Always wears magenta top and green apron dress.
- Karali Dadu: Retired lawyer. Member of Chirantani Club.
- Mittir Aunty: Mrs. Mitra, aunt of Hulo and Batali, member of Chirantani Club.
- Karmakarta: President of Daspara Chirantani Club.
- Wife of Karmakarta: A joly and music lover woman, member of Chirantani Club.
- Professor Babu: A scientist who lives in Dashpara, helps Nut, Boltu, Chimti and Borobabu in need.
- Ranga Dadu: Nut's mother's maternal uncle. Nut's distant grandfather.
- Panchu Dadu: Boltu's mother's paternal uncle. Boltu's distant grandfather.
- Murilal, Kanu, Kakatua, Cheala: Robbers, who are caught because of Nut and Boltu's intelligence every time they steal or rob.

== See also ==
- Gopal Bhar (Animated TV series)
- List of Indian animated television series
