= Crime Time =

- Created by: Santosh Sawant
- Written by: Kelly Ward; Steve Kasper; Nassos Vakalis
- Directed by: Nassos Vakalis
- Composers: Kostas Christides (117 episodes); Roto Shah (2 episodes)
- Country of origin: India
- No. of seasons: 1
- No. of episodes: 120

Production
- Executive producer: Jay Zaveri
- Producer: Steve Kasper
- Running time: 2 minutes
- Production company: Future Thought Productions

Original release
- Network: Cartoon Network
- Release: 1 December 2008 – 2009

Crime Time is a series of animated shorts produced by Future Thought Productions, produced by Jay Zaveri and Steve Kasper, and directed by Nassos Vakalis.

== Premise ==
Shifty (The Criminal) perpetrates crimes from the sublime to the ridiculous – and never quite pulls them off, resulting in hilarious consequences. It is rendered in a graphic style reminiscent of classic UPA shorts.

Crime Time gives the viewer a brief but comical look at the irony of crime. Taking on the spirit of old-world cartoons, the series uses sight gags and pacing to bring about a comedic scenario. Produced in a combination of Flash and CGI animation, the creators utilize classic elements of storytelling to give this series a unique personality. The series, which consists of shorts varying in length from 90 to 180 seconds, introduces a comic anti-hero character Shifty (The Criminal) who seems to always be just moments away from successfully beating the system only to have his plans derailed by some unforeseeable circumstance.

== Characters ==
Shifty – The series' main villain protagonist.

The Fat Cop – An unnamed overweight police officer. He partners up with The Skinny Cop.

Lance the Skinny Cop - A thin police officer and the partner of The Fat Cop.

Female Robber – A female robber who is Shifty's one-time girlfriend who only appears in The Girlfriend episode.

== Episodes ==
1. Electro-Phobia
2. The Bank Robbery
3. Paint Job
4. Statue
5. The Getaway
6. The Painting
7. Under Control
8. The Gift
9. The Car Robbery
10. Laundry
11. Night Job
12. Parking Meter
13. The Treasure
14. Masked Ball
15. Midnight Lover
16. Tracer
17. The Red Dye
18. Drive Thru
19. Wish Pond
20. Subway
21. Gooooal
22. Cleaning up
23. Monkey Business
24. Sleepwalker
25. Lost Cat
26. Vending Machine
27. Cruiseship
28. Fitting Room
29. No Strings Attached
30. Way Out West
31. At the Movies
32. Pharaohs Revenge
33. Going Batty
34. Grin and Bear It!
35. All That Glitters is Gold
36. At The Circus
37. The Hiker
38. The Black Pearl
39. The Baby
40. The Genie
41. The Barber
42. The Bridge
43. The Birthday Cake
44. The Transport
45. The Buffet
46. The Dollar Bill
47. The Musician
48. Minus Zero
49. The Golden Nugget
50. Tips
51. The Paparazzi
52. The Party
53. Shifty the Cyclist
54. The Horse Race
55. The Diver
56. UP, Up and Away
57. Bum Steer
58. Shifty Skywalker
59. The Masked Destroyer
60. I Smell a Rat
61. Pizza
62. The Camper
63. Public Restrooms
64. The Dog Walker
65. The Great Jump
66. Gopher Broke
67. A Clean Sweep
68. Spaced Out
69. Backyard Trouble
70. Easy Come Easy Go
71. The Fur Coats
72. Gardening
73. The Hitch Hiker
74. The Mountain Climber
75. The Valet
76. The Spa Treatment
77. Slope, Slope
78. The Funeral
79. The Map
80. The Talented Ant
81. The ATM
82. The Scrap Metal
83. Car Racing
84. Snap Shot
85. The Jackpot
86. The Hypnotist
87. The Pilot
88. The Bus Driver
89. Area 51
90. The Jeweler
91. The Chariot Driver
92. The Girlfriend
93. Halloween Ghosts
94. Hot Air
95. Ancestors
96. A Knights Tale
97. Oils Well that Ends Well
98. Rodeo Show
99. A Looney Tribute
100. Private Property
101. Monster Truck
102. Window Washer
103. Royal Jewels
104. The Clean Getaway
105. The Break In
106. First Impressions
107. Robin Hoodwinked
108. The Dummy
109. Mans Best Friend
110. Out of Sight
111. One Hell of a Day
112. Spooked
113. Batteries not Included
114. The Pirate
115. The Fall Guy
116. The Prize
117. The Airport
118. Have a Blast
119. Sweet Dreams
120. RobotFly 4000

== See also ==
- List of Indian animated television series
