= Nassos Vakalis =

American film director

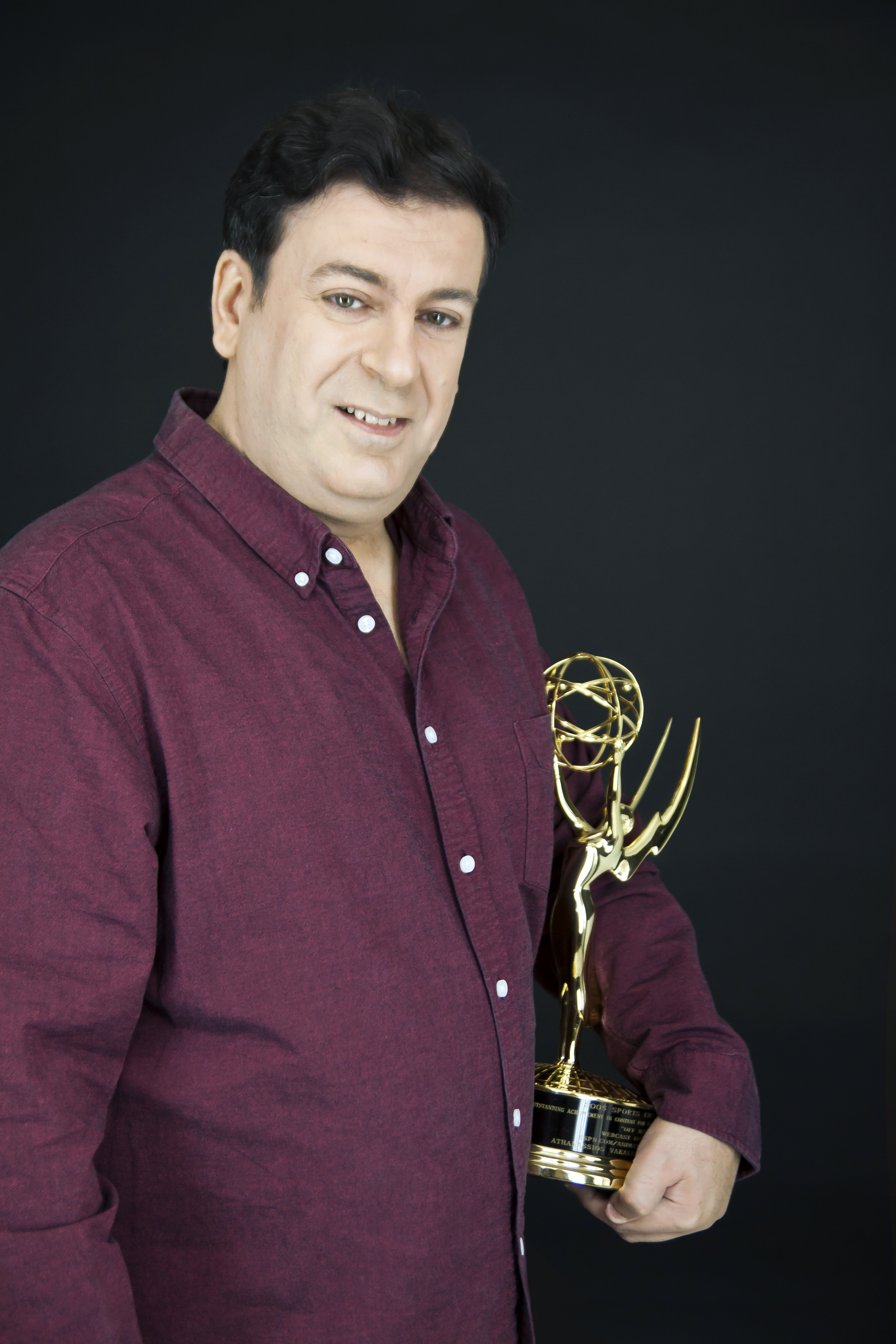
Nassos Vakalis holding his Emmy award

Nassos Vakalis (Greek: Νάσος Βακάλης) is an animation director and animator.

== Early life ==
Nassos (Athanassios) Vakalis was born and raised in Athens, Greece. Since childhood, he demonstrated an interest in art, submitting his early work in various contests and winning numerous prizes and distinctions.

== Education ==
During adolescence Nassos’ interest turned toward character animation. He got his start working as a cartoon and graphics artist for several advertising agencies and small studios in Athens and later pursued his studies in art and animation in the United States. Nassos attended the Department of Film and Video at Pratt Institute, New York and acquired his B.F.A. in Fine Arts, majoring in Character Animation from California Institute of the Arts, Valencia, California. During his senior year at college, Nassos participated in the Short Film Festival of Drama Greece where he premiered his animated debut film Don't Feed the Bear. This film attracted the attention of legendary animation director Don Bluth, who offered Nassos a permanent position with his company.

== Professional career ==
In Sullivan-Bluth Studios, Nassos began as an animation assistant but scant weeks later he was promoted to animator. In that position he completed the production of the films Rock-a-Doodle, A Troll in Central Park and Thumbelina, developing his talent and skills under real production conditions and requirements. Soon after he became Supervising Animator "The Great Animal and Crocodiles", "Footmen" for the film The Swan Princess for Rich Entertainment and simultaneously worked freelance on many advertising spots, shorts and other feature films.

In 1995, when Warner Bros. opened its new animation studios in Los Angeles, he became Supervising Animator and he was assigned to design and animate "Kayley", the lead character in the feature animated film The Magic Sword: Quest for Camelot. During his career at Warner Bros., Nassos explored story, storyboarding and conceptual development and was involved with the pre-production of many projects the studio had in development at the time.

In 1997, Nassos was appointed by his alma mater, the California Institute of the Arts, to teach Character animation. A year later he joined the newly founded DreamWorks, Character Builders where he worked closely with Steve Hickner, director of Prince of Egypt, with whom he formed a friendship. Between 1998 and 2000 at DreamWorks, Nassos completed Joseph: King of Dreams and storyboards for the films Outlaws, Tusker, Tortoise and Hare and the acclaimed Spirit: Stallion of the Cimarron.

At the end of the 90s, during a professional trip to London, Nassos met Panagiotis Rappas, another Greek animation artist and owner of Stardust studios. Together, they founded Time-Lapse Pictures LLC and signed a deal with Klasky Csupo for the production of the Paramount release Rugrats in Paris: The Movie. A year later, Time Lapse Pictures was relocated to Athens Greece, where Nassos returned to produce and supervise animation for several sequences of Sony's Eight Crazy Nights and Paramount's Rugrats Go Wild as well as El Cid the Legend for the Spanish Filmax and Jester Till for the German Munich Animation, as well as many 2D and 3D commercials for the Greek and international market.

In late 2004 Nassos returned to Los Angeles where he now lives with his wife.

In 2006 Nassos was awarded by the National Academy of Television Arts & Sciences with an Emmy for outstanding achievement in content for non-traditional delivery platforms for the ESPN show Off Mikes and in 2007 he was again nominated for an EMMY for the second season of "Off Mikes". Nassos has also worked on the popular short animated internet series Crime Time as a Director and has penned several of the shorts himself. Crime Time has reached 25 million views worldwide. During 2007-2009 Nassos and Time-Lapse PIctures co-produced the animated Christmas specials " The Little Mouse That Wanted to Touch a Star" and "The Boy and the Tree" based on a short stories by Eugene Trivizas. " The Little Mouse That Wanted to Touch a Star" received awards at the Cyprus International Film Festival, ANIMFEST '09, International Film Festival of Patras city-11th International Panorama and London Greek Film festival and "The Boy and the Tree" was voted by the EUROPEAN BROADCASTERS UNION (EBU) as the Second best production in Europe for children and juniors 2009.

Since 2009 Nassos has also completed two short animated films. "Human Nature" which received an honorary distinction at the 2011DIGI competition at the 34th Drama film festival and "Dinner For Few" (Special Mention to a Greek film in International Competition 2014, at Animasyros), an allegorical depiction of society. During its festival run "Dinner For Few" won over 78 international awards including the prestigious 2015 Borge Ring Award hosted by the Danish Animation Society (ANIS), in conjunction with the Odense International Film Festival. The film qualified for the 88th Academy awards and was nominated for the Silver Méliès Award at the Lund Fantastic Film Festival.
