= Gonu Jha =

Court jester in 13th-century

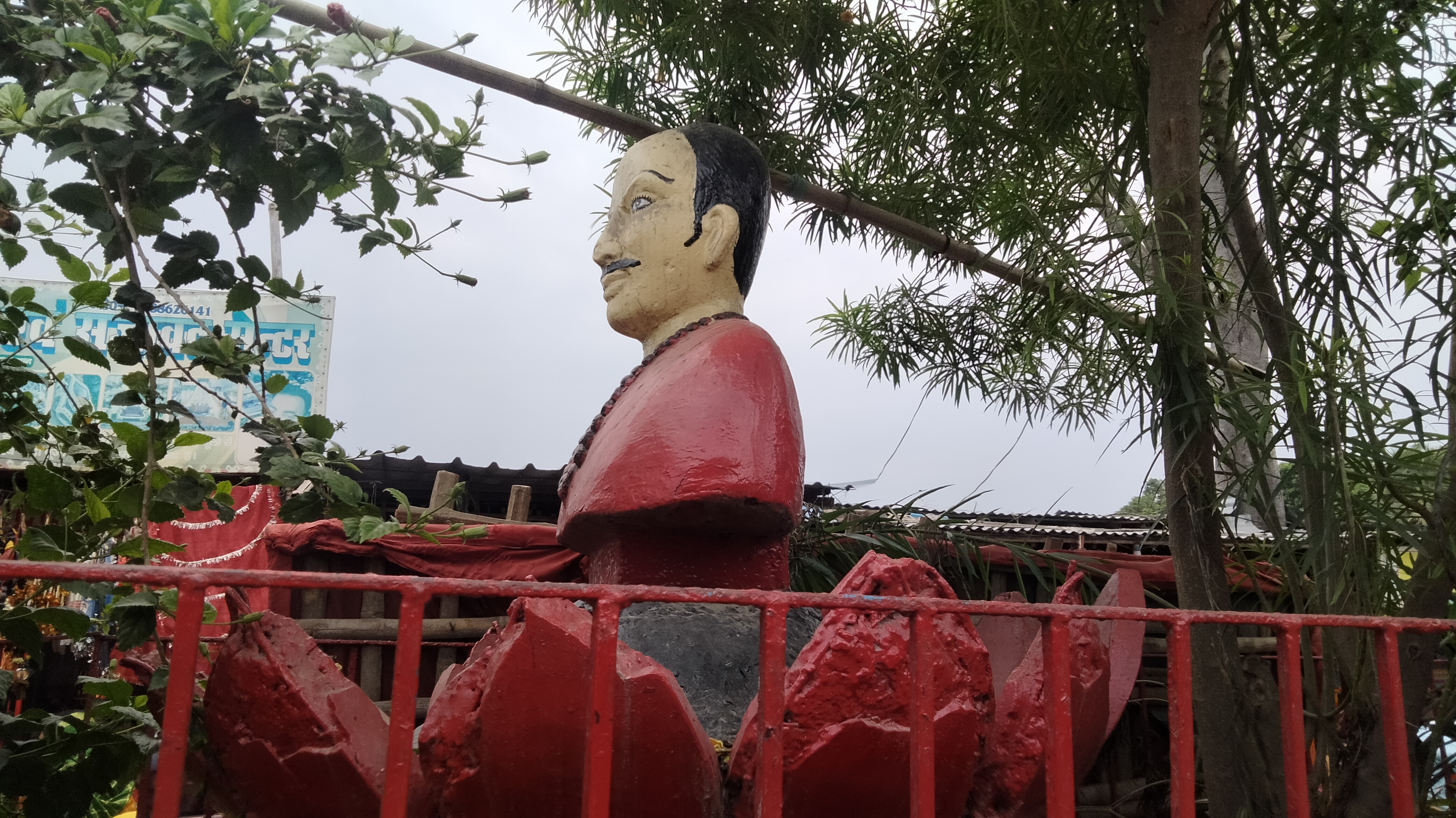
Memorial Statue of Gonu Jha at the entrance of the Uchchaith Bhagawati Mandir Complex

Gonu Jha was a "Pratyutpannamati" (ready-witted) character and a contemporary of King of Mithila in the 13th century CE. Renowned for his sharp wit, intelligence, and sense of humor, he is often referred to as the "Birbal of Bihar," drawing parallels with other iconic court jesters like Tenali Rama and Gopal Bhar. He was a military scholar of Mithila.

== Background ==
Gonu Jha is believed to have lived during the 13th or 14th century CE. He hailed from Bharwara village, in present-day Darbhanga district of Bihar.

He was a contemporary of King Hari Singh of Mithila and served as a courtier in his court.

== Folklore and legacy ==
Gonu Jha's tales are an integral part of Mithila's rich oral tradition. His stories often depict him using his cleverness to outsmart adversaries, challenge societal norms, and bring justice to the common people. The tales of Gonu Jha have been passed down through generations, primarily in the Maithili language, and continue to be a source of inspiration and amusement.

== In popular culture ==
- Gonu Jha (film), a Bhojpuri comedy film directed by Shreeman Mishra was released in 2014. In that film, Navin Mishra portrayed the character of Gonu Jha.

== See also ==
- Gopal Bhar
- Tenali Rama
- Birbal
- List of people from Bihar
