= List of C.I.D. Kolkata Bureau episodes =

This is a list of episodes of CID Kolkata Bureau.

== 2012 ==
| No. | Title | Original release date |
|---|---|---|
| 1 | "Apoharon Rahasyo" | 12 November 2012 |
A little girl goes missing from a mall where she has come to shop with her mother.
| 2 | "Bhuture Hotel" | 13 November 2012 |
A hotel manager and his security manager steal drugs from a dealer. The security manager hides the drugs in a pond, planning to keep the money for himself. After killing him, the manager disguises the body as the security manager and later haunts the hotel while searching for the drugs.
| 3 | "Blackmail" | 19 November 2012 |
Important government security information gets stolen by a gang of criminals.
| 4 | "Saharey Santrash" | 20 November 2012 |
| 5 | "Gaye Holud" | 26 November 2012 |
During the preparations of the Haldi ceremony, two people are found murdered.
| 6 | "Tatoo" | 27 November 2012 |
A former Kolkata Police sharpshooter is shot dead at a film shooting location.
| 7 | "Phobia" | 3 December 2012 |
| 8 | "Maron Phaand" | 4 December 2012 |
A headless woman's body is found in the river.
| 9 | "Protisodh" | 10 December 2012 |
Manoj, a police informer dies from a lethal electric shock while attempting to start his bike.
| 10 | "Narokhadok" | 11 December 2012 |
In Kolkata, black plastic bags with chopped body parts are being found all over the city.
| 11 | "Bishakto Gahona" | 17 December 2012 |
A dead body is found lying in a deserted corner of a shopping mall's parking area. The CID team finds a bottle of poison near the body and suspects that it is a case of suicide.
| 12 | "Maron Rashi" | 18 December 2012 |
The CID team receives a letter from an unknown person who challenges them to stop him from committing a murder. Along with the letter, he sends a secret code that the officers must solve to find a clue about the murder he is planning.
| 13 | "Joda Khuner Rahasyo" | 24 December 2012 |
An elderly woman and her neighbor, a young woman named Divya, are both found shot dead.
| 14 | "Serial Killer" | 25 December 2012 |
The CID team finds a woman tied to a tree with steel cords in the middle of a forest. Her eyes are wide open, and there are injuries all over her body. The officers begin investigating the case to find out what happened to her.
| 15 | "Premdando" | 31 December 2012 |

== 2013 ==
| No. | Title | Original release date |
|---|---|---|
| 16 | "Maatrireen" | 1 January 2013 |
| 17 | "Chorbazaar" | 7 January 2013 |
| 18 | "Durg-er-nesha" | 8 January 2013 |
Two students die from a drug overdose, leading the CID team to investigate their deaths and uncover a possible connection to Kolkata's drug mafia.
| 19 | "Aakrosh" | 14 January 2013 |
| 20 | "Hanabari" | 15 January 2013 |
| 21 | "Parinayer Parinam" | 21 January 2013 |
| 22 | "Adbhuture" | 22 January 2013 |
| 23 | "Jiban Niye Khela" | 28 January 2013 |
| 24 | "Khelar Naam Mrityu" | 29 January 2013 |
| 25 | "Samayer Bichar" | 4 February 2013 |
| 26 | "Parokiya" | 5 February 2013 |
| 27 | "Bishphorak" | 11 February 2013 |
| 28 | "Artho Anartho" | 12 February 2013 |
| 29 | "Pyanchar Pyanche" | 18 February 2013 |
| 30 | "Jighangsa" | 19 February 2013 |
| 31 | "Agyaato Atotayee" | 25 February 2013 |
| 32 | "Rashichakro" | 26 February 2013 |
| 33 | "Samayer Chakrabyuhe" | 4 March 2013 |
| 34 | "Ghatak Bullet" | 5 March 2013 |
| 35 | "Guptodhaner Sondhane" | 11 March 2013 |
| 36 | "Prem Aahuti" | 12 March 2013 |
| 37 | "Muktir Naam Mrityu" | 18 March 2013 |
| 38 | "Chhadmabeshi" | 19 March 2013 |
| 39 | "Aabir" | 25 March 2013 |
| 40 | "Mrityur Pheriwala" | 26 March 2013 |
| 41 | "Mrityur Magic" | 1 April 2013 |
| 42 | "Maron Prem" | 2 April 2013 |
| 43 | "Bandini" | 8 April 2013 |
| 44 | "Prem Aagun" | 9 April 2013 |
| 45 | "Gurudakshina" | 15 April 2013 |
| 46 | "Aaghat" | 16 April 2013 |
| 47 | "Sahosi Sei Meye" | 22 April 2013 |
| 48 | "Bandho Darjar Opare" | 23 April 2013 |
| 49 | "Nikhonj" | 29 April 2013 |
| 50 | "Chakrabuyhe Arjun" | 30 April 2013 |
| 51 | "Maron Khelay" | 6 May 2013 |
| 52 | "Adbhoot Atotayee" | 7 May 2013 |
| 53 | "Virus Juddho" | 13 May 2013 |
| 54 | "Mrityur Haatchhani" | 14 May 2013 |
| 55 | "Protarak" | 20 May 2013 |
| 56 | "Swarnodando" | 21 May 2013 |
| 57 | "Antorale" | 27 May 2013 |
| 58 | "Mrityubandhan" | 28 May 2013 |
| 59 | "Ranajoyee" | 3 June 2013 |
| 60 | "Nayikar Khonje" | 4 June 2013 |
| 61 | "Highway Ebong" | 10 June 2013 |
| 62 | "Achena Tara" | 11 June 2013 |
| 63 | "Chirkut" | 17 June 2013 |
| 64 | "Aadim Ripu" | 18 June 2013 |
| 65 | "Chhayamanobi" | 24 June 2013 |
| 66 | "Nodir Kinara" | 25 June 2013 |
| 67 | "Indraboloy" | 1 July 2013 |
| 68 | "Adrishyo Trikon" | 2 July 2013 |
| 69 | "Doshi Ke?" | 8 July 2013 |
| 70 | "...shudhu Bish" | 9 July 2013 |
| 71 | "Kencho Khunrte Keute" | 15 July 2013 |
| 72 | "Mrityubishad" | 16 July 2013 |
| 73 | "Bohuroopi" | 22 July 2013 |
| 74 | "Bhootrango" | 23 July 2013 |
| 75 | "Deya Neya" | 29 July 2013 |
| 76 | "Premroshe" | 30 July 2013 |
| 77 | "Ekdin Raate" | 5 August 2013 |
| 78 | "Shab Shaishab" | 6 August 2013 |
| 79 | "Prem Na Protishodh?" | 12 August 2013 |
| 80 | "Rakhibandhan" | 13 August 2013 |
| 81 | "Bhootbanglo" | 19 August 2013 |
When a NRI girl Puja comes to India to sell her ancestral bungalow, she discovers that the locals consider it a haunted property. Following the mysterious disappearance of a prospective buyer and her friend’s mental breakdown, Puja approaches the CID.
| 82 | "Mrityu Na Hatya" | 20 August 2013 |
A man jumps off a building in front of several residents of the society.
| 83 | "Mrityudoot" | 26 August 2013 |
CID team arrive at the murder scene and are shocked by the unusual pattern of the killings. After discussing the evidence, they conclude that a serial killer may be behind the murders.
| 84 | "Aaro Ekjan" | 27 August 2013 |
| 85 | "Shubho Janmodin" | 2 September 2013 |
A grand birthday celebration is organized by businessman Raghavendra for his son Rishabh. The festivities come to an abrupt end when Rishabh drinks from his glass and suddenly dies.
| 86 | "Aalor Dishari" | 3 September 2013 |
| 87 | "Kankal Rahasyo" | 9 September 2013 |
A heated argument between road workers leads the CID team to a shocking discovery. A skeleton is unearthed from beneath the road, revealing a mysterious cold case.
| 88 | "Mitro Sanhar" | 10 September 2013 |
| 89 | "Khela Bhangar Khela" | 16 September 2013 |
| 90 | "Agyaatobase Ekalabyo" | 17 September 2013 |
| 91 | "Khiladi Ebar Cid" | 23 September 2013 |
Film actress Nusrat receives a threatening call from an unknown person, warning her not to associate with her co-star Ankush, or else she will face serious consequences.
| 92 | "Bishkahini" | 24 September 2013 |
| 93 | "Gharer Shatru Bibheeshan" | 30 September 2013 |
| 94 | "Asampto Adhyay" | 1 October 2013 |
| 95 | "Mrityumichhil" | 7 October 2013 |
| 96 | "Lukochuri" | 8 October 2013 |
A dead body is found buried at an under-construction site. The CID team discovers that the victim was killed with an antique spear and finds a hidden map on his body. They begin investigating the victim's identity and the mystery behind his unusual murder.
| 97 | "Sesh Sakkhatkar" | 7 January 2014 |
ACP Bir Singha is on a mission to rescue a boy from a kidnapping gang. Using his intelligence, he breaks the gang's plans and gets the criminals arrested. However, ACP Bir Singha soon faces a serious threat when he discovers that the crime is much bigger than he expected.
| 98 | "Phire Dekha" | 14 October 2013 |
| 99 | "Mukh O Mukhosh" | 15 October 2013 |
| 100 | "Aarale Ke?" | 21 October 2013 |
| 101 | "Abhishapto Prasad" | 22 October 2013 |
| 102 | "Ratnogarbha" | 28 October 2013 |
| 103 | "Ek Lekhika Mrityu...ebong" | 29 October 2013 |
| 104 | "Ajana Ateet" | 4 November 2013 |
| 105 | "Khunjey Phiri" | 5 November 2013 |
| 106 | "Rakter Akkhorey" | 11 November 2013 |
| 107 | "Mrityur Gahwarey" | 12 November 2013 |
| 108 | "Damini Damaney" | 18 November 2013 |
| 109 | "Murtir Antorale" | 19 November 2013 |
| 110 | "Narighatok" | 25 November 2013 |
| 111 | "Badodiner Bado Gappo" | 26 November 2013 |
| 112 | "Doob Santar" | 2 December 2013 |
| 113 | "Ghor Atanko" | 3 December 2013 |
| 114 | "Patri Niruddesh" | 9 December 2013 |
| 115 | "Ashanto Swargodwar" | 10 December 2013 |
| 116 | "Ghare Pherar Daak" | 16 December 2013 |
| 117 | "Bish Najore" | 17 December 2013 |
| 118 | "Bishakto Phand" | 23 December 2013 |
| 119 | "Kriti Dampotir" | 24 December 2013 |
| 120 | "Bipader Gheratope" | 30 December 2013 |
| 121 | "Bipadseema Perie" | 31 December 2013 |

== 2014 ==
| No. | Title | Original release date |
|---|---|---|
| 122 | "Mon Ku-ashay" | 6 January 2014 |
| 123 | "Ansho Anuragi" | 13 January 2014 |
| 124 | "Mrityur Rasayan" | 14 January 2014 |
| 125 | "Khela Bhanglo Jakhon" | 20 January 2014 |
| 126 | "Cholakola" | 21 January 2014 |
| 127 | "Mrityukhela" | 27 January 2014 |
| 128 | "Roop Badole" | 28 January 2014 |
| 129 | "Bhulanko" | 3 February 2014 |
| 130 | "Badla" | 4 February 2014 |
During a birthday party, the CID team conducts a sudden raid after receiving information about illegal drugs. During the search a packet of drugs are found hidden inside a girl's mobile phone.
| 131 | "Sajano Saja" | 10 February 2014 |
Two men come on a bike and stop a car in the middle of the road. One of them gets off the bike, points a gun at the man inside the car, and robs him.
| 132 | "Abhishapto Choukath" | 11 February 2014 |
| 133 | "Antortadanto" | 17 February 2014 |
| 134 | "Atotayee" | 18 February 2014 |
| 135 | "Mrityur Aloy" | 24 February 2014 |
