= Gopal Bhar =

Court jester in 18th-century Bengal

- Court Jester of Krishnanagar
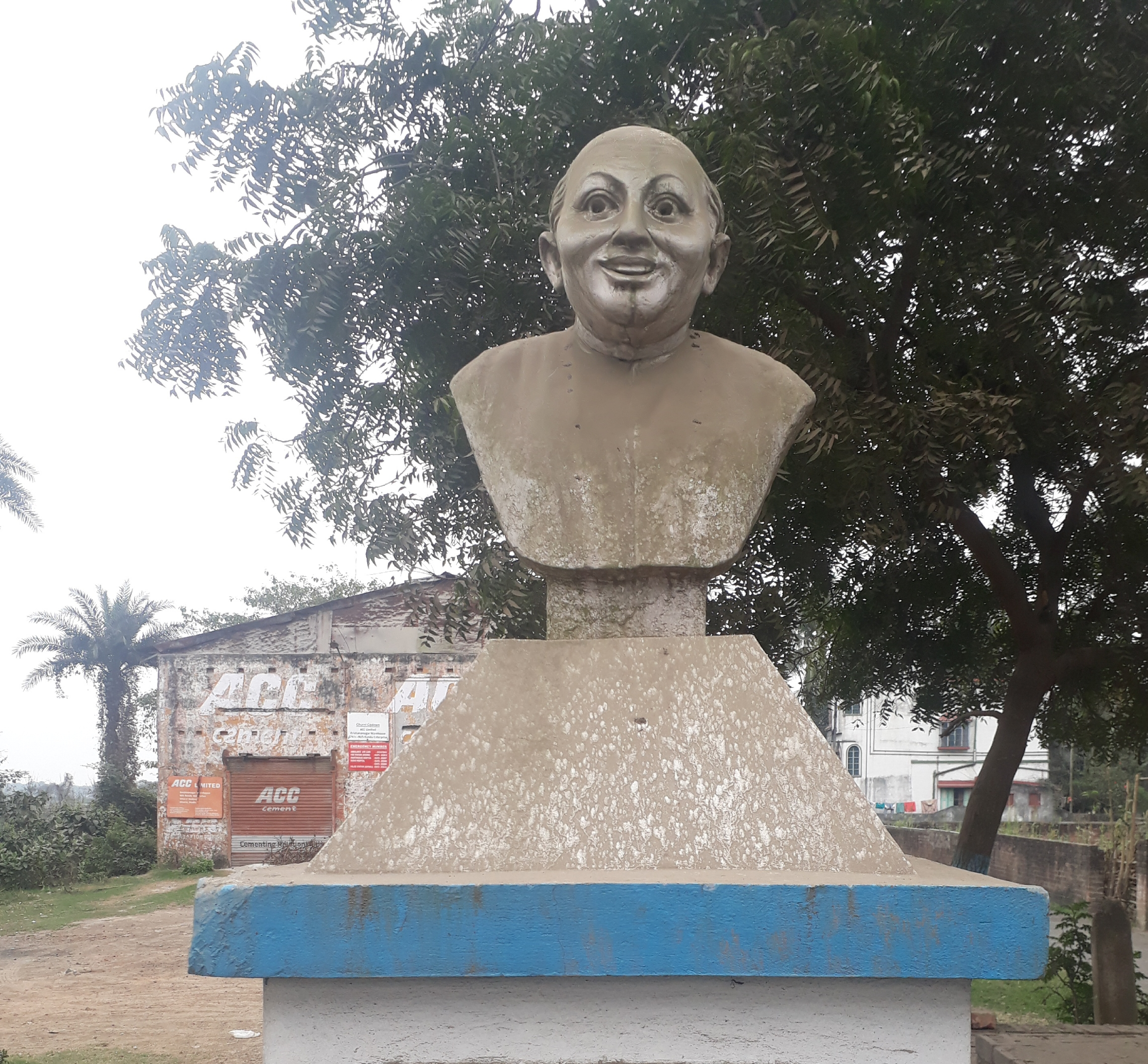
- Statue of Gopal Bhar at Krishnanagar, Nadia
- Born: Gopal Chandra Pramanik; 23 September 1701; Ghurni, Nadia Raj, Bengal, Mughal Empire
- Died: 1767 (aged 65–66); Krishnanagar, Nadia Raj, Bengal (present-day West Bengal, India)
- Occupation: Courtier and jester in the court of Raja Krishnachandra Roy

Gopal Chandra Pramanik (Note: Bengali: গোপালচন্দ্র প্রামাণিক, Bengali pronunciation: [ɡopal t͡ʃɔnd̪ɾo pɾamanik].) (1701–1767), popularly known as Gopal Bhar or Gopal Bhand (Note: Bengali: গোপাল ভাঁড়, Bengali pronunciation: [ɡopal bʱãɽ].) (Bengali: গোপাল ভাঁড়, Bengali pronunciation: [ɡopal bʱãɽ]), was an 18th-century figure in Bengal who is said to be a humorist, bhand, and jester in the court of Raja Krishnachandra Roy (r. 1710–1783), the king of Nadia Raj. Legends say that he was a part of the Navaratnas (lit. 'Nine-jewels') of Krishnachandra's court. His statue can still be seen in the Royal palace and in Ghurni, Krishnanagar town. Gopal is believed to have possessed a keen intelligence. Although the historicity of the figure remains disputed, he remains a revered character in Bangladesh and the Indian state of West Bengal.

== Stories ==
Tales of his exploits are narrated in West Bengal and Bangladesh to this day in numerous short stories. Their origin may be traced to local oral cultures of humour. The stories are popular and humorous, often ridiculing figures of authority, including the king, Krishnachandra, himself. Many of his stories depict him coming up with inventive and clever answers to satisfy the whimsical requests of royal personages, such as the Maharaja and the Rani. In some stories, Raja Krishnachandra asks him to complete certain tasks specifically to test his intelligence, or to embarrass him in public. Gopal Bhar always rebuffs the attempt successfully. The application of humour never crosses over to the realm of direct disrespect, but manages to point out the weakness in the opponent's argument or conviction. As such, his stories are comparable with those of Birbal, Tenali Raman, Gonu Jha and Nasreddin.

== Historicity ==
There exists widespread debate over the historicity of the figure "Gopal Bhar". Gopal Bhar's name was not mentioned in Bengali literature before 19th century. A 1926 book Nabadwip-Kahini (lit. 'The Nabadwip Tales') written by Nagendranath Das, a self-claimed descendent of Gopal Bhar, mentions Gopal's summarized biography. According to the book, Gopal's birth name was Gopalchandra Nai, who came from a Napit family. He was a Bhandar (caretaker) of Krishnachandra's court, from where the word Bhand or Bhar came. Gopal's father, Dulalchandra Nai, was a Vaidya at Nawab Alivardi Khan's court. Gopal's older brother Kalyan Dulal saved Prince (later Nawab) Siraj-ud-Daulah's life from severe fever. After hearing about Gopal's intelligence, Raja Krishnachandra appointed him as his court jester. Nagendranath also claimed that there is an oil painting of Gopal at Krishnachandra's palace.

No reference for Gopal can be found in the writings of Bharatchandra Raigunakar and Ramprasad Sen, both of whom were court poets in Raja Krishnachandra's court. According to Banglapedia, there was a person named Shankar Taranga, who is known to have been a bodyguard of Raja Krishnachandra and whom the raja regarded highly because of his wisdom and courage.

Despite the scarcity of evidence, researcher-journalist Sujit Roy supported the historical authenticity of Gopal Bhar, claiming that many documents about him had lost, destroyed or looted. Prominent Bengali linguist Sukumar Sen opined:

"The curiosity for Gopal Bhar among the modern Bengalis has given rise to a national tradition of folklore about this real or fictional person, and the seed of its arousal is the Bhar part of his name, by which many have identified the caste of Gopal considering the Bhar of Gopal Bhar to be a variant of the Sanskrit word Bhandar. Whatever the arguments for and against, Gopal Bhar remains ingrained in Bengali humour and folk culture."

== Politics ==
On 20 February 2024, after 2024 Bangladeshi general election, Gono Odhikar Parishad leader Nurul Haq Nur, criticising Sheikh Hasina, claimed that the Sangsad had turned into the "club of Gopal Bhar" where parliamentarians' work is to "entertain the king".

During 2024 Indian general election campaign, Trinamool Congress supporters, including the West Bengal government minister Ujjwal Roy, slammed BJP MP candidate from Krishnanagar Amrita Roy, who is the titular queen of Krishnanagar, accusing her ancestor Raja Krishnachandra Roy for the death of Gopal Bhar. Although, historian Goutam Bhadra claimed that there is no proof that Raja Krishnachandra was responsible for the death of Gopal Bhar.

== In popular culture ==
- Gopal Bhar (film), a Bengali comedy film directed by Amal Sur was released in 1980. In that film, Santosh Dutta portrayed the character of Gopal Bhar.
- Gopal Bhar (TV series), a Bengali television series was made where Raktim Samanta played the role of Gopal Bhar as a young child. The series aired on Star Jalsha from 2017 to 2018.
- Gopal Bhar (Animated TV series), an animation series also popular in Sony Aath YouTube channel. On YouTube, more than 1000 episodes are made and still counting.

== See also ==
- Gonu Jha
- Tenaliram
- Birbal
- Nasreddin
