= Jungle Tales with Mowgli =

2026 Indian animated television series

- Promotional poster
- Genre: Animation; Comedy; Slapstick
- Based on: Characters from The Jungle Book by Rudyard Kipling
- Written by: Praveen Fernandes; Jovita Dsouza
- Directed by: Santosh Pednekar; Abhijit Daripkar
- Voices of: Nilofer Middey Khan; Vinod Kulkarni; Anil Dutt; Waren Dsouza; Jigna Bharadwaj; Ankit Goswami; Gaurav Haldar; Shiney Prakash
- Music by: Simaab Sen; Nakash Aziz
- Composer: Simaab Sen
- Country of origin: India
- Original languages: Hindi, Tamil, Telugu, English

Production
- Production company: JioStar India

Original release
- Network: Disney Channel
- Release: 12 September 2026

Jungle Tales with Mowgli is an Indian animated slapstick comedy television series produced by JioStar and inspired by Rudyard Kipling's The Jungle Book stories. The series follows ten-year-old Mowgli on his jungle adventures with characters including Baloo, Bagheera and Sher Khan. It premiered on 12 September 2026 on the streaming service JioHotstar and the television channel Disney Channel.

== Premise ==
The series follows Mowgli, a curious and mischievous ten-year-old living in the jungle, whose tendency to get into trouble drives each story. Episodes feature situational comedy, chases and comic exchanges between characters. Mowgli is helped by his friends Baloo and Bagheera, while Sher Khan, Kaa and Tabaqui act as his rivals.

== Voice cast ==
- Nilofer Middey Khan as Mowgli
- Vinod Kulkarni as Sher Khan
- Anil Dutt as Baloo
- Waren Dsouza as Bagheera
- Jigna Bharadwaj as Bae
- Ankit Goswami as Kaa
- Gaurav Haldar as Tabaqui
- Shiney Prakash as Wolfeena

== Production and broadcast ==
JioStar announced Jungle Tales with Mowgli as the 16th local title in its Kids & Family portfolio in September 2026. Nivea and Tedibar were associated with the series as sponsors. The series airs on Disney Channel and is also available on JioHotstar. It airs from 2:00 to 2:30 pm and 7:30 to 8:00 pm.

== Reception ==
In September 2026, journalist Vaishnavi Gavankar included Jungle Tales with Mowgli in Moneycontrol's list of five shows and films to watch, alongside Bigg Boss 20, Daayra, Vibe and Papa Yaar. Gavankar described the series as a family-friendly animated adventure suited to younger viewers.

Vijaya Mishra of ABP News included the series in a weekend OTT watchlist, noting its slapstick humour, playful banter and jungle adventures. In November 2026, Bristi Dey of Indulge Express featured the series in a list of five shows and films to watch for Children's Day.

== See also ==
- The Jungle Book (2016 film)
- The Jungle Book (1989 TV series)
- The Jungle Book (2010 TV series)
- List of Indian animated television series
