= Bantul (disambiguation) =

Bantul is the capital of Bantul Regency in Indonesia.

Bantul may also refer to:

- Persiba Bantul, a football club based in Bantul
- Protaba Bantul, a football club based in Bantul
- Bantul the Great, an Indian comic strip character
- Bantul the Great (2010 animated series), an Indian animated television series produced by Animatrix Multimedia
- Bantul the Great (animated series), an Indian animated series released in Direct-to-video format and produced by Angel Television Private Limited
