= Future Thought Productions =

Future Thought Productions is a creative animation studio that creates, produces, or contributes to film, television, web, and mobile animation.

It is amongst the first studios in the world to have employed Macromedia's Flash software for the UNICEF television series Meena, with veteran Indian animator Ram Mohan in 2002. The show was a UNICEF effort to empower the girl child in South Asia and provide valuable education concerning problems related to the developing nation's children. The character has become a role model for girls in South Asia.

Thereafter, Future Thought was involved in a global effort to produce a series of public service announcements (PSAs) that would promote the prevention of HIV-AIDS through twenty comic, humorous shorts named The Three Amigos. The series has been a success throughout the world; it has been broadcast in over 20 languages, reaching several million youth aged 16 to 24. The Reverend Archbishop Desmond Tutu lent his support to the project. The series won the Golden Reel at the Chicago Film Festival and the Grand Festival Award at the Berkeley Film and Video Festival in 2004.

In 2006, Future Thought Productions contributed a 19-minute animated segment called That Darn Jesus (for the feature film Universal Remote), which is amongst the first known uses of Adobe's Flash software for the theatrical screen in full HD. Future Thought Productions have been involved in over twenty television, web and mobile projects in both Flash and 3D (computer generated animation) that have been broadcast in over 60 countries across North America, Europe and Asia since 1997.

Future Thought has won accolades at the Promax & BDA Awards (for a series of IDs produced for Nick Philippines), the Hollywood Film Festival (for Haptics, a 3D short film), and the Foyle Film Festival.

Future Thought has also been involved as a co-producer in the pre-school show OzieBoo!, which has distribution to 100 territories around the world. Future Thought's latest project Crime Time is a series of animated shorts with multi-platform distribution.

== Productions ==
- Crime Time
- Bizarre Love Trangle
- Feliz Navidad
