= Tenida (TV series) =

Indian bengali animated television series

- Genre: Animated series Comedy
- Based on: Tenida by Narayan Gangopadhyay
- Directed by: Tapan Chakraborty
- Voices of: Sabyasachi Chakraborty; Debashis Ghosh; Tapan Chakraborty; Abhijit Biswas; Manab Majumdar; Bhaskar Dasgupta; Mohan Bhoumik; Kanchan Gupta; Chaitali Moulik; Pradeep Poddar; Arindam Nath
- Theme music composer: Antu Shantanu
- Composer: Antu Shantanu
- Country of origin: India
- Original language: Bengali
- No. of seasons: 1
- No. of episodes: 52

Production
- Executive producer: Rajeshwari Roy
- Producer: Arijit Bhadra
- Editor: Vikash Shroff
- Running time: 16–22 minutes
- Production company: Animatrix Multimedia

Original release
- Network: Zee Bangla
- Release: 3 June 2007 – 25 May 2008

Tenida is an Indian animated television series based on same name fictional character by Bengali author Narayan Gangopadhyay. The series produced by Animatrix Multimedia and aired on Zee Bangla in 2007 to 2008. The story set on fictional town Potoldanga and four friends title character Teni and Kyabla, Habul, Pyalaram.

== Cast ==
=== Main voice ===
- Sabyasachi Chakraborty as Tenida
- Debashis Ghosh as Kyabla
- Tapan Chakraborty as Habul
- Abhijit Biswas as Pyalaram

=== Episodic voice ===
- Manab Majumdar
- Bhaskar Dasgupta
- Mohan Bhoumik
- Kanchan Gupta
- Chaitali Moulik
- Pradeep Poddar
- Arindam Nath

== Episode ==
| Episode No. | Title | Air Date |
|---|---|---|
| 1 | Sanghatik | 3 June 2007 |
| 2 | Chengis O Hamliner Banshiola | 10 June 2007 |
| 3 | Tenida Aar Yeti | 17 June 2007 |
| 4 | Dhaush | 24 June 2007 |
| 5 | Ekadoshir Ranchi Yatra | 1 July 2007 |
| 6 | Camouflage | 8 July 2007 |
| 7 | Honolulur Makuda | 15 July 2007 |
| 8 | Cricket Mane Jhijhi | 22 July 2007 |
| 9 | Dashanan Charit | 29 July 2007 |
| 10 | Prabhat Sangeet | 5 August 2007 |
| 11 | Halkhatar Khawadawa | 12 August 2007 |
| 12 | Charmurti (Part 1) | 19 August 2007 |
| 13 | Charmurti (Part 2) | 26 August 2007 |
| 14 | Bearing Chhat | 2 September 2007 |
| 15 | Bon Bhojon (Part 1) | 9 September 2007 |
| 16 | Bon Bhojon (Part 2) | 16 September 2007 |
| 17 | Porer Upokar Kario Na (Part 1) | 23 September 2007 |
| 18 | Porer Upokar Kario Na (Part 2) | 30 September 2007 |
| 19 | Bhajahori Film Corporation | 7 October 2007 |
| 20 | Chamchike Aar Ticket Checker | 14 October 2007 |
| 21 | Peshawar Ki Aamir | 21 October 2007 |
| 22 | Dadhichi, Poka o Bishwakarma | 28 October 2007 |
| 23 | Jhaw Banglar Rahasya (Part 1) | 4 November 2007 |
| 24 | Jhaw Banglar Rahasya (Part 2) | 11 November 2007 |
| 25 | Jhaw Banglar Rahasya (Part 3) | 18 November 2007 |
| 26 | Jhaw Banglar Rahasya (Part 4) | 25 November 2007 |
| 27 | Jhaw Banglar Rahasya (Part 5) | 2 December 2007 |
| 28 | Jhaw Banglar Rahasya (Part 6) | 9 December 2007 |
| 29 | Jhaw Banglar Rahasya (Part 7) | 16 December 2007 |
| 30 | Tattabodhan Mane Jibe Prem | 23 December 2007 |
| 31 | Kak Kahini | 30 December 2007 |
| 32 | Kutti Mamar Hater Kaj | 6 January 2008 |
| 33 | Kutti Mamar Donto Kahini | 13 January 2008 |
| 34 | Kankrabiche (Part 1) | 20 January 2008 |
| 35 | Kankrabiche (Part 2) | 27 January 2008 |
| 36 | Charmurtir Abhijan (Part 1) | 3 February 2008 |
| 37 | Charmurtir Abhijan (Part 2) | 10 February 2008 |
| 38 | Charmurtir Abhijan (Part 3) | 17 February 2008 |
| 39 | Charmurtir Abhijan (Part 4) | 24 February 2008 |
| 40 | Charmurtir Abhijan (Part 5) | 2 March 2008 |
| 41 | Bhaja Gauranga Katha | 9 March 2008 |
| 42 | Nangchadar Hahakar (Part 1) | 16 March 2008 |
| 43 | Nangchadar Hahakar (Part 2) | 23 March 2008 |
| 44 | Brahmabikasher Donto Bikash | 30 March 2008 |
| 45 | Matsho Puran | 6 April 2008 |
| 46 | Nidarun Protishodh | 13 April 2008 |
| 47 | TikTikir Lej | 20 April 2008 |
| 48 | The Great Chhatai | 27 April 2008 |
| 49 | Ekta Football Match | 4 May 2008 |
| 50 | Khattango O Palanno | 11 May 2008 |
| 51 | Kombol Niruddesh (Part 1) | 18 May 2008 |
| 52 | Kombol Niruddesh (Part 2) | 25 May 2008 |
