= Yogyakarta (disambiguation) =

Yogyakarta is a city and capital of the Special Region of Yogyakarta. Yogyakarta may also refer to:

- Yogyakarta International Airport (YIA)
- Yogyakarta Principles, a document about human rights with regard to sexual orientation.
- Special Region of Yogyakarta, a provincial-level autonomous region in Indonesia.
- Yogyakarta Sultanate, a Javanese monarchy in the Special Region of Yogyakarta.
