= Sony Aath =

Indian Bengali television channel

- Logo used since 2022
- Country: India
- Broadcast area: India; Bangladesh
- Headquarters: Kolkata, West Bengal, India

Programming
- Language: Bengali
- Picture format: 576i SDTV

Ownership
- Owner: Sony Pictures Networks
- Sister channels: See List of channels owned by Sony Pictures Networks

History
- Launched: March 2008; 18 years ago
- Former names: Channel 8 (2008–2010)

Links
- Website: Sony AATH

Availability

Streaming media
- SonyLIV: Sony AATH Shows

Sony Aath is an Indian Bengali-language general entertainment pay television channel owned by Sony Pictures Networks, with programming mostly consisting of television series from SET India dubbed in Bengali. It was launched in 2008 as Channel 8, and was later acquired by Sony in early 2009, which subsequently rebranded it as Sony Aath. It is Sony Pictures Networks India's first regional television channel, and in May 2020 was the fastest growing Bengali-language television channel in India over the past four years.

== History ==
In November 2007, Kolkata-based film production house Channel 8 announced to launch a Bengali-language film channel, Channel 8 Talkies, under the banner Bangla Entertainment Pvt. Ltd. The channel was planned to be launched the following month, but was delayed. The company also announced to launch a general entertainment channel by July 2008. Channel 8 was launched in March 2008 as a film channel, serving audiences in West Bengal and Tripura, as well as parts of Assam and Orissa. It was originally a free-to-air channel.

As part of Sony Pictures Television International's ambitions to enter the regional television market in India, Multi Screen Media acquired Channel 8 in early 2009. The channel was subsequently rebranded as Sony Aath, officially marking Sony's first entry into the non-Hindi Indian regional market. As senior vice president of Multi Screen Media, Tushar Shah handled the channel, who had been consulting the channel for a few months.

Sony Aath created C.I.D. Kolkata Bureau, a local adaptation of the Indian crime detective series CID, premiering in November 2012. The channel was the broadcaster for the Indian Bengali audiences of the 2014 FIFA World Cup, helping it with a whopping 265 per cent rise in viewership. On 8 March 2015, Sony Aath introduced a kids' slot airing on Sundays named "Sunday Funday", premiering with Gopal Bhar. It broadcast the 2015 Indian Premier League in the Bengali language.

Sony Aath began airing Hollywood movies dubbed in Bengali every weekend on 4 July 2021. On 24 October 2022, along with all other SPNI channels, Sony Aath changed its logo in order to align more with Sony's global ethos. In January 2026, Ambesh Tiwari was appointed to head Sony Aath, alongside Sony Pictures Networks' Kids and Animation Portfolio.

== Current programming ==
- CID
- Crime Patrol
- Mahabali Hanumaan
- Bade Acche Lagte Hain
- Hastinapurer Bir
- Kailash er Mahagatha
- Raandhuni na Kaanduni
- Premik Premika ar Petni

=== Animation ===
- Gopal Bhar
- Nut Boltu

== Former programming ==
=== Dubbed series ===
- Aahat
- Adaalat
- Aladdin – Naam Toh Suna Hoga
- Aamar Sai: Shroddha Aar Dhoiryo
- Baalveer
- Bhayanak
- Bhanwar
- Boogie Woogie Kids Championship
- Bharater Veer Putra – Maharana Pratap
- Eka
- Bir Hanuman
- Encounter
- Entertainment Ke Liye Kuch Bhi Karega
- F.I.R.
- Gutur Gu
- Hottath 37 Bochar Por
- Jakhon Bhoot Ashe
- Konta Satyi Konta Durghatona
- Ladies Special
- Maa Lokhir Aalo
- Surya: The Super Cop
- Shrimad Ramayan
- Tomar Meye Ki Kore?
- Virrudh

=== Animated shows ===
- Paap-O-Meter
- Taarak Mehta Kka Chhota Chashmah
- Oggy and the Cockroaches

=== Original programming ===
- C.I.D. Kolkata Bureau

=== Original animated shows ===
- Kalpopurer Galpo
- Mahabharat
- Nix Je Sob Pare
- Panchotantrer Mantro
- Amader Thakurmar Jhuli
- Gultemama
- Jiyo Gopuda

=== Animated movies ===
- Goyenda Gopal: Daaba'r Chaal
- Goyenda Gopal: Sesh Chakranto
- Goyenda Gopal: Antim Pratishodh
- Gopaler Buddhi Bhooter Mukti
- Nut-Boltu Aar Bhooter Bari
- Sarbamani Churi
- Gopal O Guptachar
- Cheetar Guhaye Nut Boltu
- Gopal Banam Alamgir

== See also ==
- Sony YAY!
