= Kuku Mey Mey =

- Also known as: Kuku and the Goat
- Genre: Slapstick comedy
- Written by: Carmen Zainabadi
- Directed by: Anish Patel
- Country of origin: India
- Original language: None
- No. of seasons: 1
- No. of episodes: 78

Production
- Running time: 7 minutes
- Production company: HopMotion Animation

Original release
- Network: Amazon Prime Video; Toon Goggles

Kuku Mey Mey is an Indian animated slapstick comedy television series produced by HopMotion Animation. It premiered on Toon Goggles and Amazon Prime Video simultaneously under the title Kuku and the Goat.

== Synopsis ==
Mey Mey lives in an inn in a jungle. Kuku, tries to break into the inn but Mey Mey has set up traps to dissuade Kuku.

== Characters ==
- Kuku: Kuku always tries to get into Mey Mey's inn. Despite being a lion, he is not violent.
- Mey Mey: Mey Mey is a goat who lives an inn in a forest. When Kuku tries to get in, he sets up traps.

== Reception ==
It was nominated for FICCI's Best Animated Frames award in the Episode (Indian) category.
