= Kumbh Karan =

Indian animated television series

- The show's characters (left to right): Dadi Maa, Kabira, Sardar, Kumbh (with Kaddu on top of his head), Karan, and Tara
- Also known as: Kumbh & Karan
- Genre: Comedy
- Written by: Divya Chandel; Vikas Chandra; Kaushik Chawla
- Creative directors: Silas Hickey; Uttam Pal Singh
- Country of origin: India
- Original language: Hindi

Production
- Executive producers: Mark Eyers; Rick Fernandes
- Running time: 22 minutes
- Production company: Cornershop Animation

Original release
- Network: Pogo
- Release: 1 June 2010 – 5 February 2011

Kumbh Karan is an Indian animated television series broadcast by the Indian kids channel Pogo. The show was released on 1 June 2010. The show earned a budget of more than $300,000.

Video games based on the show have been released including Kumbh Karan Quest for Sanjivani, a mobile video game by Jump Games.

== Plot ==
The show is centered on the adventures of Kumbh and Karan, two twin brothers who stay in the small colony of Ajab-Gajabpur. Kumbh is chubby, lazy, sleepy, and hungry, but awfully strong with a real soft heart. Karan, on the other hand, is an agile, sharp and better (looking) version of his twin. With their friend Tara, and Kumbh's pet porcupine Kaddu, the twins travel worldwide on various quests.

== Characters ==
- Kumbh is a plump cherubic 10-year-old boy. He's named after the mythic giant Kumbhakarana in the Ramayana who slept for six months straight and could be revived only with the aroma of food.
- As Kumbh's twin brother, Karan shares Kumbh's eyes, big ears, but the similarities ends there.
- 7 year old, Tara is Kumbh and Karan's best friend in Ajab-Gajabpur.
- Kaddu is Kumbh's pet porcupine who loves food as much as Kumbh. He follows his master everywhere like a Siamese twin.
- Sardar is the reluctant Chief of Ajab-Gajabpur.
- Kabira is the trusted lieutenant of Sardar and he is the one who trains Kumbh and Karan in everyday archery and warfare.
- Dadi Maa is the motherly caretaker of the two boys.
- Super Chacha is the one who always creates interesting things.

== Overseas ==
The cartoon was aired on Hiru TV, in Sri Lanka with the name "Kadiyay Thadiyay".

== See also ==
- List of Indian animated television series
