= Maha Movie =

Indian Hindi Movie Channel

- Country: India
- Broadcast area: India
- Headquarters: New Delhi, India

Programming
- Language: Hindi
- Picture format: 576i (SDTV)

Ownership
- Owner: DV Media & Entertainment Pvt. Ltd.
- Sister channels: Maha Punjabi, Maha Bangla

History
- Launched: 1 June 2014

Links
- Website: Official Website

Maha Movie is a Free-to-Air, Hindi movies channel owned by DV Media & Entertainment. The channel was announced in 2013 and launched on June 1, 2014.

== History ==
Maha Movie is the third channel launched by DV Group of Companies; the precursor company to Teleone Consumers Product Pvt Ltd.

== List of movies ==
- Luv Kush (1963)
- Daanveer Karn (1964)
- Om Namah Shivay (1965)
- Maa Shakti (1967)
- Veer Eklavya (1970)
- Aankh Micholi (1972)
- Jwaar Bhata (1973)
- Ganga Gowri (1973)
- Raja Kaka (1974)
- Apne Dushman (1975)
- Dasavatharam (1976)
- Raeeszada (1976)
- Ankh Ka Tara (1978)
- Hamara Sansar (1978)
- Maan Apmaan (1979)
- Rajnikanth The Boss (1982)
- Mujhe Insaaf Chahiye (1983)
- Bhishama (1983)
- Jai Shiv Shankar (1985)
- Niddar (1986)
- Sabse Bada Badshah (1990)
- Shakti Tera Naam (1990)
- Dharam Ki Jung (1991)
- Naseebwala (1992)
- Naag Mera Rakshak (1992)
- Akhiri Intaqam (1992)
- Mawaali Raj (1993)
- Prateeksha (1993)
- Chicken Mughlai (1993)
- Aag Aur Chingari (1994)
- Aaj Ka Shaktiman (1994)
- Mahanandi (1994)
- Aaj Ka Chinna (1994)
- Nazar Ke Zamne (1995)
- Sirf Tum Hi Tum (1996)
- Nazarr (1996)
- Mission Mera Maqsad (1998)
- Jallad No. 1 (2000)
- Chotta Johnny (2001)
- Saala Saheb (2001)
- Yes Or No (2001)
- Tum Jiyo Hazaron Saal (2002)
- Baaghi Aurat (2002)
- Kiccha (2003)
- Ramchandra (2003)
- Shikaar - The Musical Thriller (2004)
- Kalasi Palya Junction (2004)
- Ranga (2004)
- Relax (2005)
- Mestri (2005)
- Barf Ka Toofan (2005)
- Mar Mitenge (2006)
- Love In Japan (2006)
- Kasam Tere Ishq Ki (2006)
- Khaki Vardi (2007)
- Hukumat Ki Jung (2007)
- Tiger Siva (2007)
- Gundaraaj (2007)
- Ek Aur Jabaria Jodi (2007)
- Phir Aaya Deewana (2008)
- Navagraha (2008)
- Andhi Aur Toofan (2008)
- Mr. Medhavi (2008)
- Deepavali (2008)
- Chanchal (2008)
- Bombay Ka Baadshah (2008)
- Meri Padosan (2009)
- 16 Days (2009)
- Kahani Choron Ki (2009)
- Junction (2009)
- Crash Point (2009)
- The Hero - Abhimanyu (2009)
- Bhai Arjuna (2010)
- Mera Iraada (2010)
- Ek Aur Ladaku (2010)
- Drohi (2010)
- Kasam Mardangi Ki (2010)
- Kalyug Ka Sathyam (2010)
- Sapon Ka Humla (2010)
- Hoo (2010)
- Puzhal (2010)
- Meri Pukar (2010)
- Dildaar Ashique (2011)
- Mallikarjuna (2011)
- Jurassic Shark (2012)
- Khoonkhar Hasina (2012)
- Big Bad Bugs (2012)
- Guruvaram (2012)
- Ek Aur Wanted (2012)
- Do Janbaaz (2013)
- Vijayanagaram (2013)
- Operation Duryodhana 2 (2013)
- Dhoni VS Sehwag (2013)
- Tevar - The Real Story (2013)
- Hara (2014)
- Murari (2014)
- Veeran Muthu Rakku (2014)
- Ghar Ek Chambal (2014)
- Daring Revenge (2014)
- Ek Khiladi Ek Haseena (2014)
- Jai Lalitha (2014)
- Khel - The Dirty Game (2014)
- Kill Them Young (2015)
- Welcome God (2015)
- Neralu (2015)
- The Real Kidnap (2015)
- Angry Ganesha (2016)
- Demon Hunter (2016)
- Kiragoorina Gay Yaligalu (2016)
- Monkey Twins (2016)
- Nataraja Service (2016)
- The Real Policewala (2017)
- 1930 - A Devil Story (2017)
- Red Spring (2017)
- Reevolution (2017)
- Rakt Charitra (2017)
- Sabse Bade Thugg (2017)
- Vanavillu (2017)
- Do Partner (2017)
- Seedhi Takkar (2017)
- Sweetie Weds NRI (2017)
- India tour of West Indies (2017-2018)
- Prathikshanam (2017)
- Na Jaane Kaun (2017)
- HBD - Hacked By Devil (2018)
- Atone (2019)
- Simha Sena (2019)
- The Trees Have Red Eyes (2020)
