= Maha Punjabi =

Indian TV channel

- Country: India
- Broadcast area: India

Programming
- Language: Punjabi
- Picture format: 576i (SDTV)

Ownership
- Owner: DV Media & Entertainment Pvt. Ltd.
- Sister channels: Maha Movie, Maha Bangla

History
- Launched: 1 March 2019
- Former names: T TV

Links
- Website: Official Website

Maha Punjabi is a Punjabi music & movies channel launched on 1st of march, 2019. It is Free-to-air channel launched by Teleone Consumers Products which is part of DV Group.

== Programming ==
- Bhotu Da Vehra
- Dhansu Beats
- Swag Punjab Da
- Vardaat
- Daawat By Chef
