= Gopal Bhar (TV series) =

Indian animated TV series

- Title card
- Genre: Comedy
- Created by: Sourav Mondal; Hansa Mondal
- Based on: Gopal Bhar
- Written by: Sourav Mondal; Hansa Mondal
- Directed by: Sourav Mondal; Hansa Mondal
- Voices of: Rajendra Prasad Majumder; Partha Pratim Nath; Rabin Seth; Ujjwal Mondal; Parthasarathi Dasgupta; Manojit Bose; Sudipto Mitra; Ashish Ghosh; Hansa Mandal; Shippy Mitra; Shubhechchha Mitra
- Countries of origin: India, Bangladesh
- Original language: Bengali
- No. of seasons: 1
- No. of episodes: 1,321

Production
- Producers: Sourav Mondal; Hansa Mondal
- Production locations: Kolkata, West Bengal
- Animators: Sourav Mukherjee; Manoj Kumar Prasad; Banshari Samanta; Somnath Debnath; Subinoy Roy; Swadesh Mondal; Kapil Acharya; Rima Chakraborty; Pabitra Sadhu; Souradip Pradhan; Souma Prasad Yash; Aniruddha Mondal; Abhishek Dhara; Tarapada Chowdhury; Chiranjit Mondal; Bappaditya Das; Shubhadwip Dutta Bonik; Souvik Panchal
- Editors: Koushik Pyne; Koushik Sarkar
- Production company: Ssoftoons Production

Original release
- Network: Sony AATH; SonyLIV
- Release: March 8, 2015 – present

Gopal Bhar is an Indian animated comedy television series based on legendary Bengali court jester Gopal Bhar. Since 2015, the series start airing on Sony AATH television channel and after airing episode digitally available on SonyLIV.

== Characters ==
=== Main ===
- Gopal Bhar – jester at the royal court, the main character
- Krishnachandra Roy – King of Krishnanagar/Nadia/Nabadwip (older episodes)
- Rani/Maharani – Wife of Raja Krishnachandra Roy; queen consort of Krishnanagar and princess of Bijaygar
- Mantri (minister)
- Parbati (Gopal's wife)
- Mantri Ginni (Minister's wife)
- Raj Bigyani (court scientist)
- Sabha Kabi (court poet)
- Raj Pandit (court priest)
- Raj Baidya (court physician)
- Raj Jatishi (court astrologer)
- Amatya (minister)
- Senapati/Sanatan Sen (commander-in-chief)
- Siraj-ud-Daulah – Nawab of Murshidabad/Bengal
- Wazir (Ooajir) (Grand Vizier)
- Gopal's nominal grandchildren:
  - Gulte
  - Nyapla
  - Puti
  - Tepa (Puti's younger brother)
  - Puchke (Puti's younger brother)
- Mantri's associates:
  - Bota (Botokrishno)
  - Ghota (Ghotokrishno)
  - Bhagaban (acting minister in some later episodes)
- Kelepocha – Gopal's associate, previously a thief
- Bhola moyra –confectioner in Krishnanagar
- Khoka – Gopal's son
- Minu – Gopal's daughter
- Bishwambhar – Gopal's son-in-law
- Ramu – Puti's father
- Puti's mother

=== Minor ===
- Amatya (Member of the court of King Krishnachandra, a minor minister)
- King of Khambaj (Khambaj Raja)
- Minister of Khambaj Raja (Khambaj Mantri)
- Gopal's brother-in-law
- Gopal's mother-in-law
- Nawab's ambassador
- Raj Pandit's wife
- Raj Baidya's wife
- Raj Jatishi's wife
- Senapati's wife
- Begum of Murshidabad (Nawab's wife)
- Gopal's grandson

== See also ==
- Nut Boltu
- List of Indian animated television series
