= Paap-O-Meter =

Animated Canadian-Indian television show

- Voices of: Sourav Chakraborty
- Countries of origin: Canada; India
- Original languages: Hindi; English
- No. of seasons: 6
- No. of episodes: 173

Production
- Camera setup: Single-camera
- Running time: 11 minutes
- Production companies: Ssoftoons; Nelvana

Original release
- Network: Sony YAY! (India); YTV (Canada)
- Release: 14 April 2017

Paap-O-Meter (English: Meter-of-Sins) is a Canadian-Indian horror comedy cartoon show that airs on Indian television channel Sony YAY! and Canadian television channel YTV The show is available in Hindi, English, Tamil, Telugu, Bengali, Marathi and Malayalam across major DTH and Digital Cable Platforms.

== Plot ==
The story revolves around the adventures of Bhoot Boss and his assistants, Pakela and Thakela, who seek out sinners and teach them a lesson. Together, they live high in the sky, in the ghost world, and keep an eye on Earth to ensure that sinners are always under control. The Meter Of Sins (Paap-O-Meter) tells them if any human has committed a sin, and by pressing its button, they can see what the person has done. Along with the main assistants, Bhoot Boss has many more assistants who feature occasionally in the show like Hatela. According to 'Chidhaana Paap Hai' and 'Genie VS Bhoot', when Pakela and Thakela are sent to make things right without Bhoot Boss, they only make every situation worse; that's when Bhoot Boss intervenes and corrects the situation.

In the newer seasons (from Season 5), the ghosts live on Earth, which means that instead of knowing the sinner when the Paap-O-Meter rings, they will find the sinner after a person undergoes a plight tell them what their plight is, in addition to their visibility to that person. Other than correcting sinners, they solve many other people's plights which does not have a sinner involved.

== Characters ==
=== Main ===
- Bhoot Boss: Bhoot Boss is the noble, disciplined leader of the trio, who is in charge of the Paap-O-Meter, and is mainly responsible for keeping the level of sin on Earth in check. He is a mentor to Thakela and Pakela and always comes to their rescue, whenever they goof up their mission to reduce the amount of sins on the planet. (Voiced by Mahendra Bhatnagar)
- Thakela: Thakela is a lazy, junior ghost who works for Bhoot Boss and is a companion of Pakela. He is an adorable ghost boy who loves to sleep and eat. If given a chance, he will sleep for days. His sleeping routines have made him so lazy that he throws temper tantrums every time he is called for duty. His love for eating is shown in various episodes. (Voiced by Viral Shah)
- Pakela: Pakela is an equally lazy yet witty junior ghost, who also works for Bhoot Boss and is Thakela's partner. Like his associate, Pakela gets irritated when he has to work but does not throw temper tantrums like Thakela. He always tries to beat Thakela but fails miserably most of the time. He plays more pranks than Thakela does. (Voiced by Vaibhav Thakkar)
- The Sinners: The sinners are the people who sinned. They later become good people when Bhoot Boss teaches them about what they did wrong and how to prevent that in the future. Some sinners were spared by the ghosts, while others were sent to jail by the ghosts or themselves. They even were punished by getting their form changed, which was common in the show's fourth season (some were changed back to normal while one of them was not).

=== Recurring ===
- Hatela: He is a 13-year-old, more energetic ghost and always tricks Thakela and Pakela in whichever episode he appears in. He has a nice sense of humor, which causes Bhoot Boss to appreciate him, despite working with him less.
- Inspector Lobo: He is a 33-year-old police officer who, whilst claiming to be extremely brave and strong, proves to be quite cowardly and weak. Bhoot Boss sends a lot of criminals to his police station since he often does not catch a lot of them. (Voiced by Trilok Patel in earlier seasons)
- Changu and Mangu: Former sinners who did not allow kids to pass the exams, who are now police officers. They work with Inspector Lobo and prove to be smarter than him.
- The Paap-O-Meter: A machine with 4 heads that tells Bhoot Boss and his assistants when someone is committing a major sin. It can also serve as a residence, as shown in the first few episodes of the show. When a button is pressed, you can see what the sinner in question has done. (Appeared in seasons 1-4)
- Thakela Super Sr.: The grandfather of Thakela. His fashion sense matches the era of the Wild Wild West. He appears in the episode titled "TP Ke Dadaji" (Voiced by Viral Shah)
- Pakela Super Sr.: The grandfather of Pakela. His fashion sense also matches the era of the Wild Wild West. He also appears in the episode titled "TP Ke Dadaji" (Voiced by Vaibhav Thakkar)

== Episodes ==
- Season 1: 26 episodes (11 minutes each)
- Season 2: 26 episodes (11 minutes each)
- Season 3: 20 episodes (11 minutes each)
- Season 4: 32 episodes (11 minutes each)
- Season 5: 20 episodes (11 minutes each)
- Season 6: 51 episodes (11 minutes each)

=== Season 1 (2017) ===
The first season of Paap-O-Meter consists of 26 episodes.

No.	Name	Plot	Airdate				
No.	Name	Plot	Airdate	1a	Cycle Thief	The Ghosts come to Earth in order to stop their first sinner, the infamous cycle thief Johnny who has stolen many cycles from children.	14 April 2017
1b	Sonu Sleepwalker	Sonu, a 9-year old boy, fakes sleepwalking in order to make his walk to school more fun and causes chaos to his town.	15 April 2017				
2a	The Toy Thief	Hari Gopal, a 21-year old man, robs his customers' houses and even attacks them by scout-patrolling his toy army if they buy a toy from his shop, like a man who bought a teddy bear for his son Bablu.	16 April 2017				
2b	The Cream Thief	Raju, an employee of a biscuit factory eats all of the cream in the biscuits. This leads to some people, especially kids being upset and others getting scolded after being accused of eating cream.	17 April 2017				
3a	Batting Chor	Ballu never gives his friends the chance to bat and when his turn is over he throws the ball away.	18 April 2017				
3b	Math Stress	Sonu Rohan, a 9-year old child, hates Maths and troubles his teacher Gopu for it.	19 April 2017				
4a	Wood Smuggler	Jogi Seth cuts down thousands of trees in a jungle for making wooden furnitures, causing mass-deforestation. This troubles all of the animals who reside there and forces them to migrate somewhere.	20 April 2017				
4b	Back Bencher	Changu and Mangu scare all of the kids including the class toppers Venu and Rohan in order to get first in their school class, so they have to do little work.	21 April 2017				
5a	Video Game	Golu refuses to listen to his mom and repeatedly plays video games rather than playing with his friends or doing homework. When he is sent to play with his friends, he selfishly drops one of their beloved things at a location where they can never get it back, so that he can focus on going back to play video games.	22 April 2017				
5b	Puddle Lover	Jinu troubles his village's people by throwing mud at them.	23 April 2017				
6a	Kachra Monster	Shambu causes pollution by throwing trash in the entire city.	24 April 2017				
6b	Bhoot Bungalow	Some boys play cricket, making the ball enter through a bungalow. When one of them goes there, Mac Russell pretends to be a fake ghost, scares him away, and prints fake currencies.	25 April 2017				
7a	Race Driver	Rocky is a race driver who cheats to win a car race with the assistance of his allies, Changu & Mangu, who damage the engines of the other racers' cars.	26 April 2017				
7b	Shark Attack	Dr. Raka uses a fake robot shark to scare away fishermen, so the ghosts stop him.	27 April 2017				
8a	Monster Builder	Mr. Manu Seth clears out all the houses in the neighborhood to make a giant house.	28 April 2017				
8b	Online Product Chor	Sonu is assigned to deliver products to customers, but he robs them by filling the boxes with stones instead. When a customer finds out that the box had a stone instead of her product, Sonu just went away from the location in a flash.	29 April 2017				
9a	Circus	Rambo the ringmaster tortures his animals in the circus by forcing them to do super acts in front of everyone.	30 April 2017				
9b	Dhongi Baba	A sage and his assistant scare people by lying to them that there is a ghost to earn money.	1 May 2017				
10a	Hijackers Ki Aisi Ki Taisi	Three criminals known as Alpha, Delta, and Charlie hijack a plane.	2 May 2017				
10b	Jhoot Bole Kauwa Kaate	An advertiser makes ads about fake products to make people buy them to gain extra cash. He recently did that sin while describing a hair spray which strengthens someone's hair, which in reality is the exact opposite, and those who bought that product got their hair bald, much to their shock.	3 May 2017				
11a	Tyre Puncture Wala Paapi	Mahesh the mechanic lays nails on a desert road, so that passers-by puncture their cars' tyres. He then gets rich after these passers-by pay their money for him to fix the tyres.	4 May 2017				
11b	Mad Scientist	A man who is a mad scientist uses his humanoid robot named Django to loot houses and rob all of the city.	5 May 2017				
12a	Water Wastage	A little boy takes pleasure in wasting water and does not know the butterfly effect it has on the citizens, such as the road getting flooded.	6 May 2017				
12b	Animal Hunter	Raka the hunter is notorious for hunting innocent animals like a fawn.	7 May 2017				
13a	Chain Snatcher	The ghosts come to Earth to punish Tony, who steals chains from innocent women.	8 May 2017				
13b	Cheater Sportsman	While playing football, Sunny cheats by hurting other children to score a goal.	9 May 2017				

=== Season 2 (2017) ===
The second season of Paap-O-Meter has 26 episodes. The episode names are arranged in the order of production code.

No.	Name	Plot	Airdate				
No.	Name	Plot	Airdate	14a	Food Wastage	Jumbo and Jet always waste food and do not pay the money when they are confronted.	29 September 2017
14b	Food Mein Milawat	Gopichand mixes some toxic chemicals and powders in foods to get money.	16 July 2017				
15a	Museum Mein Chori	The duo Ranga and Billa rob expensive things from a museum, leaving the security guards shocked.	16 July 2017				
15b	Bank Robbers	Two robbers named Sannata and Jhannata rob money from multiple banks.	30 July 2017				
16a	TV Addict Teacher	Mr. Sajan watches cricket while checking his students' papers and his getting distracted causes them to have low grades. The children are sad over these low marks, which in reality are false.	1 August 2017				
16b	Annoying Uncle	Ganpat forces his nephew Gopu and niece Saloni to perform dances for him. This gives them a hard time.	1 August 2017				
17a	Lazy Uncle	Mr. Mohan is too lazy to travel in a bus, so he asks kids to take him on a ride on their bicycles, tiring them. He also lies about giving them treats.	27 July 2017				
17b	Bhoot vs Bhoot	A man scares people in a street. When the ghosts come to Earth, the man traps Bhoot Boss. After a scuffle, the man in a ghost's disguise is revealed to be Hatela, and those people were revealed to be some ghost allies.	8 August 2017				
18a	A Bad School Bus Driver	A bus driver rashly drives the school bus without thinking about the consequences that the children and their parents undergo.	9 August 2017				
18b	Nakli Dance Teacher	Mr. Bobby, an unqualified dance teacher, sets up a dance institute known as Aooo Dance Institute and scams students into going there. He slacks off by asking the children to dance after a person in the video, instead of teaching them proper dance steps, frustrating the students.	11 September 2017				
19a	Pencil Box Chor	Gogo steals pencil boxes from his classmates at school for the fiftieth time, and he even says there is a pencil box thief in the school, which is him.	11 September 2017				
19b	Tiffin Chor	Chunky steals food from shops without paying the shopkeepers and even steals lunches from schoolchildren when they are not there, leaving them hungrily sad.	13 September 2017				
20a	Bilwa Ko Sabak	Bilwa the barber becomes infamous for giving people bad haircuts on purpose.	1 October 2017				
20b	Gabru Rabbit Ko Sabak	Bablu's birthday party is held in Pushpa Nagar. Gabru, a man dressed as a rabbit refuses to do his job of entertaining the party-goers; instead, he only wants to eat the birthday cake.	13 September 2017				
21a	Package Deal Ya No Deal	The greedy principal of a school forces his students to get new clothes monthly.	3 October 2017				
21b	Lazy Servant	Ramu Kaka refuses to play with his nephews or give them anything to eat.	21 October 2017				
22a	Chocolate Thief	Champak steals every chocolate from his family's fridge and makes others accuse innocent children of these thefts.	30 September 2017				
22b	Bhoots vs Magician	Mr. Ghunghroo the magician goes to a village and troubles the villagers by asking them to give their money, and if they do not do so, he changes their form. The ghosts must find a way to defeat this magician through their magical powers.	21 October 2017				
23a	Monuments Destroyer	The mob leader Chandu Chandpuriya modifies the names of many landmarks by writing his name inside it, such as Taj Mahal to 'Chandu Mahal', Qutub Minar to 'Chandu Minar', and Lal Qila, to 'Chandu Qila'. Many people are worried that these landmarks may lose their significance with Chandu's name inside them.	22 December 2017				
23b	Cricket Coach	A cricket coach known as Mr. Verma only allows Rohan to bat after being bribed by Rohan's father.	23 December 2017				
24a	No Place For Kids	Mr. Khurana invades the space where children play for his car parking.	23 December 2017				
24b	Chidhana Paap Hai	Bhoot Boss tells his assistants that he is having a holiday for a few days. Later, Thakela and Pakela see that Jackie, a boy bullies many children at school, making those bullied children to tell their parents that they do not want to go to school at all. The duo go to Earth to stop him, and will they do so without Bhoot Boss?	24 December 2017				
25a	Electrician Chor	Chandu the electrician intentionally cuts down the power of many houses every night, so people will hire him to fix their electricity supply. This gives them a hard time with consumers at night.	30 December 2017				
25b	Rang Birange Bachche	Sotdu Singh, the lazy watchman of a swimming pool disallows kids from visiting there and puts pink chemicals in the pool.	26 January 2018				
26a	Shararati Bachcha	Bunty takes great pleasure in ringing his neighbors' doorbells and disappearing. This causes utter trouble to those people, as they get disturbed while doing their activities.	26 January 2018				
26b	Virus Attack	Mr. Khurana is a computer hacker who gives viruses to many computers and sells virus-free computers at a high price. This upsets many people, such as students from a school and computer technicians.	31 December 2017				

=== Season 3 (2017–18) ===
No.	Name	Plot			
No.	Name	Plot	27a	Anaath Piku	Sukhi harms Piku, a refugee dog, and disallows it from living in Heeramani Society, saddening his nephew and niece.
27b	Chandimal Ki Factory	Chandimal has a factory near a school that emits carbon dioxide there, harming the health of the students and the administration. The principal is concerned and asks Chandimal to move his factory to a place far away from the school, but Chandimal refuses to do so.			
28a	Chewing Gum Story	A teenage boy troubles the citizens of a city by using chewing gum for malicious purposes, like putting it into boys' hair to make them bald. These boys are filled with sadness because they lost their hair.			
28b	Aamon Ki Hera Pheri	Moolchand and his wife, the caretakers of a mango farm, lie to their owner that the mangoes are affected by pests, making him and his family go for a vacation. The duo later takes advantage of this by eating the farm's mangoes and selling the other mangoes to earn money.			
29a	Fun And Fair	A shopkeeper at one event in a funfair known as Babban Stall attaches the bottom tins, causing many children to get scammed like Mohit.			
29b	Fake Resort	Ronny, the owner of a resort, scams its visitors by lying to them that the resort has various amenities. He does not even give their money back by telling them that his resort has no refunds whenever they come with complaints about it.			
30a	Kite Monster	When children fly their kites at the terraces of their homes, a kite-thief, Pappu Patangbaaz, cuts all kites with his remote-controlled kite-monster drone, which even blows fires on them, ruining the children's happiness.			
30b	Toy Breaker	The teenage duo Dhinka and Chika take pleasure in breaking toys of children, making them feel depressed.			
31a	Superthief Librarian	Mr. Chandidas Chattopadhyay, the librarian of a school, cuts the pictures of comic-book superheroes for putting them in his scrapbook. Upon seeing this, the children feel shocked and disappointed.			
31b	Park Bullies	Raja and his friends claim that they have authority over a park which was recently constructed, and bully the children who visit the park, including Montu.			
32a	Kakkad Ke Business Ka Kachumbar	Kakkad sets up a store near a school, and schemes by increasing the prices of his snacks and lying to the children that they will receive health benefits after eating his snacks. Some of the children are irritated and annoyed with the fraudster's plans.			
32b	Doodh Mein Paani Yaad Dilayi Nani	Dhondu, a greedy milkman, dilutes the milk and sells it at a high price. His customers are disappointed due to his scamming behaviour.			
33a	Ice Cream Thief	Softie steals every ice-cream from every parlour in the city, which is later kept in his mega-factory. Due to this, kids are very sad that they could not get the chance to eat ice cream.			
33b	Prankster With Rubber Toys	Natti, who works as a school's peon, puts rubber toys out of nowhere to scare and prank the children, making them run away. He takes advantage of this by occupying the basketball court and eating the children's lunches.			
34a	Badtameez Autowala	An auto rickshaw driver named Mannu Manmauji is rude to his passengers and is uninterested in giving rides to them in Rocket, his rickshaw. Instead, he only wants to get a lot of money, which takes the name of rickshaw drivers in vain.			
34b	Cheater Vendor	Tony sets up a store which has school-based supplies at Sun International School, but he scams the school's students into buying low-quality items at high prices.			
35a	Shoes Chor	Montu, a thief, robs shoes when they aren't wearing it at the public and resells them to them at a price.			
35b	Monkey Man	A chimpanzee loots people's belongings at a park. When the ghosts see this, Bhoot Boss deduces that a human was dressing up as a chimpanzee since chimpanzees are not smart enough to loot. His guess was later right, after seeing that Dhurandhar was dressed up as a chimpanzee.			
36a	Animal-Disturbing Kids	Three boys named Chinku, Minku, and Pinku harass animals in a zoo, such as throwing balls at the zebras, making monkeys eat wooden bananas, and bursting fireworks at the foxes' cage. The three ghosts watch this and decide to teach them a tit-for-tat lesson.			
36b	Prank Caller	A teenage boy called Bobby troubles the people living in his apartment by giving them prank calls about bad news, which in reality are fake.			

=== Season 4 (2018–19) ===
No.	Name	Plot			
No.	Name	Plot	37a	Surila Shakaal	Surila Shakaal misuses his talent by busking in a village's street in order to hypnotize people using his music for the purpose of looting them.
37b	Pinku Popat	A lazy man called Pinku Popat takes advantage of the obliviousness of people by claiming their things and walks away, just for his benefit. This leaves those people frustrated.			
38a	Annoying Honker	Patrick is a selfish and lazy man who wakes up at a late time. Not wanting to be late to work, he honks at the road constantly for getting early to his office, oblivious of the problems it causes to those who hear it.			
38b	Flying Raja	Flying Raja, the current most wanted criminal of the police, who is on the loose misuses his talent by doing stunts, leaving many people irritated. Will the police catch him after seeing his channel's videos?			
39a	Baburam ka Horror Show	Baburam, a peon, scares children by lying to them that what happens in his horror storybook is real.			
39b	Homework Monitor	A boy named Jack is a homework monitor for his school's class because the teacher thinks that he does his homework sincerely. But the truth is that he forces his classmates to do his homework instead.			
40a	Line Tod Willy	Willy is an impatient man who fools others in order to cut lines, which he first did at a bus stop by lying to the passengers that he is a ticket conductor. The ghosts later see that Willy also tricked the movie-goers at a movie theater by telling that there is a free ticket stall.			
40b	Rude Bus Conductor	A bus conductor is rude and annoying to its passengers by doing things such as leaving the bus without them and putting animals inside the bus.			
41a	Guddu Guide	Guddu the guide, who in reality is just an unqualified person is annoying to the tourists and even asks them to buy low-quality items by lying to them that they are antiques. The other guides are sad and angry because Guddu's sins might give a bad name for being a guide.			
41b	Uncle Lolo	Bosco is a little boy who wants to ride with his Uncle Lolo in his car on Sunday. However, Lolo always breaks promises with Bosco and attends parties instead.			
42a	Daku Diwali	Daku Diwali and his gang raid a village by bursting fireworks everywhere, and even intimidate the villagers by stealing their money. The three ghosts learn about this and decide to seize this opportunity to cut him and his gang down to size Wild-Western-style.			
42b	Chindi Chand Chillar	Chindi Chand Chillar runs a canteen in a school, but he gives only chocolates rather than giving the change to the kids who buy food from there, making some complain a lot about his behavior. Instead, with his money, he buys luxurious things, such as a recliner worth 150 thousand bucks.			
43a	Pranky Baba	Pranky Baba, a mischievous teenager from Addis Ababa causes utter havoc on a town known as Sholaba by prank-calling authorities, such as the police, fire brigade and the deliveryman with others' phones, in which his own phone would not be tracked by them. His actions trouble several people day after day.			
43b	Do Not Spit Here	Phulilal, a selfish man from Phulpur, spits in public places such as playgrounds, street corners, markets and even signboards telling 'Do Not Spit Here' after eating betel, just to show his artwork. But on the flip side, he keeps his house clean.			
44a	Chiman Century	Chamanpur Cricket Team's batsman Chiman cheats by keeping a high tech computer in his bat to score centuries at every game he has played so far, out of all 99 games he has played in his career. This results in the umpires and fielders wearing protection gears, much to the bewilderment of the spectators and commentators.			
44b	Behram Bambawala	An arrogant man called Behram Bambawala defies traffic rules with his 1965 sports car, such as going beyond traffic limit and parking in wrong areas, just to reach the gallery which is owned by him. This causes chaos and trouble to pedestrians, roadside vendors and the other drivers.			
45a	Game Master Jojo	Jojo, a video-game master comes to a town and scams the children in buying his new video-game known as Hoho by not delivering them on time or at all for making money. The children get sad that their video-games were undelivered, while their parents think that Jojo is a fraudster.			
45b	Devil	Devil is a social media influencer who showoffs in front of everyone. But after he sees someone doing an act more super than him, he humiliates that person in front of public without their permission by recording a video of him scaring them. The humiliated people tear up over this act, since the likes of the videos are galore.			
46a	Babysitter Tiny Tina	A babysitter named Tina recklessly babysits the baby by doing activities such as not focusing on feeding the baby, watching videos and talking with her friends. She even stops the baby from going out of her reach by tying him through her braid.			
46b	Beimaan Contractor	Some children play cricket on a street, but they later go to a playground after being advised by Mishraji, the park's project manager, only to find it incomplete. This happened because a contractor named Bhura switched contracts to a mall when the playground was in the middle of construction.			
47a	Genie vs Bhoot	While escaping the forest from the police, Dodo the robber goes to a cabin and finds a lamp. Upon rubbing it, he frees a genie, and the two of them team up and commit crimes, causing trouble everywhere. When Thakela and Pakela are sent to stop them, will they do it for good?			
47b	Khaddar Singh Ka Museum	Khaddar Singh runs a museum with fake attractions, and lies to its visitors about several stuffs related to the museum. When two boys accidentally break a sword made up of glass worth a hundred bucks, he asks their fathers to pay a million bucks by lying to them that it is a steel sword.			
48a	Mobile Phone Addiction	Sonu and Monu, two boys who are hooked on their mobile phones, play video-games through those devices for a lot of time and henceforth, they do not play with their friend Tonu, making him feel disappointed.			
48b	Johnny Ka Paap	While playing football, Johnny, a boy who has bad sportsmanship bullies his teammate Abhi and disallows him from getting the ball just because of his stammer. Abhi feels left out since he also plays the sport exceptionally well like Johnny.			
49a	Chepu Sultan	A man called Chepu Sultan sticks posters in a city though he does this ubiquitously around unwanted areas, such as signboards, trees, and vehicles. This causes utter chaos to the public and hinders them from reading the text in the signboards and messages because his posters block the text shown.			
49b	Sukhiram Sabziwala	Sukhiram, a vegetable vendor, customers cannot select their own vegetables so that the sellers could pass on stale product; he even cheats them in weighing those vegetables. This troubles many villagers because the stale vegetables contain bacteria.			
50a	Reporter Rangeela	Rangeela the reporter and his cameraman Lallan take pleasure in pranking the watchers of his coverage by spreading fake news. His recent news coverage, which involved him describing a toy tiger washed up because of the heavy rains as a tiger in the river, had given holidays to several schools of a village.			
50b	Dhamaal Adventures	Mr. Dhamaal scams children by advertising that a campsite has a lot of amenities. He is uncaring about what the children's suffering through with the scarcity of the campsite's amenities.			
51a	Divide & Rule	Cheeku, a selfish boy, divides an item into three parts out of which one part is unequal. With this strategy, he makes people fight for the large part and then takes advantage of these brawls by stealing the large part, leaving those people disappointed.			
51b	Chakram Chutki	A sly thief called Chakram Chutki magically pickpockets people and due to this, kids did not get what they wanted.			
52a	Water Supply Mein Jhol	Tullulal, a selfish water-seller supplies very scarce numbers of water to the people of a village, making them suffer. Instead, he saves a plentiful supply of water for the 500 people-capacity rain-dance party that he is later organizing.			
52b	Time Ka Dushman Jalebiram	Jalebiram the deliveryman wastes time and does not deliver tiffin boxes to his customers, if at all and even wastes others' time. This gives problems to people such as the schoolchildren or the patients in a hospital since they are left hungry.			

=== Season 5 (2019–20) ===
No.	Name	Plot			
No.	Name	Plot	53a	Shomu Ka Hero	At Agra, Shomu does not feed his horse Hero properly, and only gives him water, making him feel totally weak. Not caring about his horse's health, he instead gives rides to local travelers in his chariot, which Hero is forced to pull it.
53b	Dagru Seth Ki Master Key	Mr Pandey, Happypur's stationmaster tells the ghosts that a robber named Dagru Seth stole the money from the passing trains and put it in Pandey's house through his master key to make him suffer things like ending up at jail, getting fired from the railway authority and losing his reputation.			
54a	Kabadiya Ka Keher	Kabadiya and his team use a factory which pollutes the water by adding chemicals. As a result, most marine life dies. Some sea creatures ask Bhoot Boss and his assistants for help.			
54b	Birthday Pe Bawaal	Today is Cheeku's birthday, but his dad does not show up because he comes late from work, making him sad. When the ghosts know about it, they go to his dad's office and find out that his employer is giving him loads of work in order to earn lots of money.			
55a	Lollakullu	When Thakela and Pakela were turned into dogs after Bhoot Boss considered them as 'useless', the ghosts later get kidnapped by Lollakullu, a pet shop owner who kidnaps other pets, and see the plights that the other animals undergo while living there. Will Bhoot Boss save them and teach Lollakullu a lesson?			
55b	Wi-Fi Papa	The three ghosts go to a place after their sleep was disturbed by fireworks and find out that people flock to see Wi-Fi Papa, a fraudster who along with his teammates plays with people's emotions by foretelling them that their respective plights will go away if they have a certain item.			
56a	Dumbola Beach Ke Dost	Three animal friends, namely Pari the woodpecker, Ruby the rabbit, and Jhony the dog live happily in Dumbola Beach until Pablo D'Costa and his two assistants attempt to destroy their houses using a bulldozer. When the worried animals reach out to the ghosts and tell their problem, the ghosts decide to prevent such things happening there.			
56b	Rinku Ke Daddu	Bemishal Gotalal Pandey, Rinku's grandfather could not get his pension from the bank because of its greedy manager Bansilal and officials Mrs. Sulekha and Mr. Mishra, who is uncaring about the plight that the other pensioners suffer.			
57a	Ghanshyam Bhoot Ki Aakhri Iccha	Ghanshyam the ghost is upset because his nephew Jabran cheated him by building a decoration center instead of a sports center.			
57b	Late Lateef Ka Long Wait	Lateef is a lazy man who wastes time and is a latecomer. This affects many people, such as two boys dancing for a play because if Lateef, who will come there as a chief-guest, does not appear, the dance will be cancelled for a third consecutive year.			
58a	Kaalakandi Bhoot Hunters	Thakela and Pakela get lost and kidnapped by the Kaalakandi ghost hunters. Meanwhile, Bhoot Boss receives news from a boy called Tikku about the kidnapping of his father & Bhoot Boss's two assistants. Will Bhoot Boss manage to save his assistants?			
58b	Reality Show Ki Reality	Ballu is a boy who registers for a reality show known as 'ApnaDancer'. The villagers and his friends from Surgaon want him to win, but Ballu does not show up, making them feel silenced and sad. Later it is revealed that Ballu did not come because the show's judge only gives the wins to his nephew Tinku.			
59a	Chor Pe Mor	Paresh the mechanic who shows his car Zoomie which can do several super acts in a convention. But on the next day, the judge Latesh Lafadiya robs Zoomie and claims that it was his invention the next day. Paresh argues with Latesh about the invention, but ends up getting arrested. The ghosts come to know about this and they plan to outwit Latesh.			
59b	Khokha Kho Gaya	A baby called Khokha gets lost from his parents in a funfair. The three ghosts ask the funfair-goers if they were Khokha's parents and go to Jooni the barber and his brother Looni because of the baby's haircut. But with the fact that Looni is forgetful, the ghosts need another way to find out the baby's parents.			
60a	Wish Come True	Danish, a boy, breaks his arm while playing football and becomes sad because he could not go to Manali along with his classmates for having fun. Thakela and Pakela see this and they, along with Bhoot Boss decide to give Danish an unforgettable experience.			
60b	Terrorika Mausi Ka Jhunjhuna	On Halloween, Manglu the ghost invites Thakela and Pakela to the home of his aunt Terrorika. When new ghosts arrive, they fight and break Terrorika's rattle in the process. Since Manglu will get scolded by her if the rattle got any scratches, the three ghosts go to Jhuman's shop to ask him for making another rattle, but unfortunately he is deaf and asks his customers to give him animals for their job to be done.			
61a	Ram Lakhan Pur Cricket Team	Ever since Ramlakhanpur's cricket team had been divided into Rampur & Lakhanpur because of the fight between the sarpanches of Rampur & Lakhanpur, namely Chunnilal & Munnilal, the players and captains became dispirited. When the ghosts know about this, they decide a way to make the sarpanches friends again.			
61b	Samandar Mein Shakalaka	Captain Katanga Katil and his pirate assistants raid a submarine, hold the crew captive and even ask them to search for Tanatan's treasure. Thakela and Pakela pose up as mermaids and decide to trick the pirates into not finding the treasure.			
62a	TP Ki Friendship Over	On Friendship Day, Thakela & Pakela are fooling around and pulling pranks on each other as usual, ending their friendship. Due to this, when they dividedly attempt to stop a robber, they make him escape. When Bhoot Boss finds this out, he decides to reunite Thakela & Pakela.			
62b	Tuntun Ki Tanatan Tale	Tuntun is a gardener who takes care of his garden very well, but he extinguishes the ants' anthill in the process because he thinks that it is only his garden. The ghosts decide to turn him into an ant-sized man for his misdeeds.			

=== Season 6 (2020) ===
No.	Name	Plot			
No.	Name	Plot	63a	Babbu Ki Badmaashi	A malicious boy named Babbu loves to abuse animals for fun, such as trapping a caterpillar with a twig, stuffing a dog's tail in a metal pipe, and pranking a cat using milk. Those animals feel uncomfortable with his antics.
63b	Nakal Mein Akal Nahi	A boy named Jimmy tells to the ghosts that Chintu, one of his classmates bullies him and the others, and even has assigned him to cheat in the upcoming exam. Will the ghosts prevent Chintu from making Jimmy cheat in exam?			
64a	Picture Abhi Baki Hai	The ghosts go to Manoranjan Cinema Hall, only to find Mr. Verma, its manager. Mr Verma tells to them that Raghu Bhai and his sidekicks Lefty and Righty annoy the wits out of not only him but also the movie-goers with their antics.			
64b	Shart Manjoor Hai	Three little boys love playing football in a park, but Rohit and his teenage group of friends tease them and disallow them from playing a sport. When the ghosts come and know about this, they organize a challenge between Rohit's team and the three boys.			
65a	Madari Ki Gaddari	The ghosts go to the beach and see a monkey named Charlie along with his juggler Chaman performing there. Charlie tells them that Chaman kidnapped him from his family, barely fed him, and forced him to do tricks galore, all for the purpose of personal gain. The ghosts then plan to teach Chaman a lesson.			
65b	Bin Bulaaye Mehmaan	Vicky and his family are troubled constantly, due to two uninvited guests, who claim to be distant relatives coming into their house and loitering there for a whopping 10 days. The lazy guests also force Vicky to do chores around the house, and they also force his mother to cook food for them.			
66a	Chor Machaaye Shor	While playing a game of police and thief, Thakela and Pakela encounter a depressed police officer. He states that he has been assigned to catch a thief named Kallu, but he eluded from his capture. This prompts the ghosts to find Kallu and arrest him.			
66b	Padosi Ki Pareshani	Natwarlal takes advantage of his neighbour named Tiwari.			

Seasons 1-6 can be watched on Amazon Prime Video, while the show's newer seasons can be watched at SonyLIV App.

== Films ==
- Paap-O-Meter Under Attack (2020)
- Paap-O-Meter: Defenders of Earth (2020)
- Paap-O-Meter: The Space Bandits (2021)
- Paap-O-Meter: Curse of Malika Toofani (2022)
