= Bantul the Great (TV series) =

Indian Bengali language animated TV series

- Title card
- বাঁটুল দি গ্রেট
- Genre: Detective; Thriller; Comedy
- Created by: Arijit Bhadra
- Screenplay by: Arijit Bhadra
- Directed by: Arijit Bhadra
- Voices of: Naren Bhattacharya; Rupan Dasgupta; Arijit Bhadra; Manas Kumar Kamila; Suman Banik; Rupak De; Baishakhi Bhowmik; Basudev Pal; Subinoy Ray; Arghya Mukherjee; Chiranjit Karmakar; Mintu Banerjee; Dhrubajyoti De; Dayal Das; Debaraj Sen; Saikat Hazra; Jaydeep Ganguly; Biswajit Biswas; Abhishek Sengupta; Samujjal Chakraborty; Prathika Basu; Joy Biswas; Shyam Sundar Haldar; Tanmoy Ghosh; Pritam Chatterjee; Sushanta Saha; Amrit Goswami; Moumita Das; Saheb Bera; Manisha Chatterjee; Sandeep Saha; Sarnya Chatterjee; Sharmistha Panja; Sandeepan De; Sanjay Bhattacharya; Saikat Manna; Dipankar Mondal
- Music by: Sudipto Saha
- Opening theme: "Bantul The Great"
- Country of origin: India
- Original language: Bengali
- No. of seasons: 1
- No. of episodes: 555 (as on Zee5)

Production
- Executive producer: Arpita Bose
- Producer: Arijit Bhadra
- Editor: Shyam Sundar Halder
- Production company: Animatrix Multimedia

Original release
- Network: Zee Bangla

Bantul The Great (Bengali: বাঁটুল দি গ্রেট) is an Indian animated series created and produced by Arijit Bhadra. The series based on Narayan Debnath's comic character of the same name. The series started airing on Zee Bangla from 4 July 2010, airing every Sunday and airing everyday from 29 March 2020 with some repeated episodes, making it one of the most successful animated cartoon series of Bengali Television. It now airs on Zee Bangla from 9am to 10am.

The series is also notable for keeping the faith and design from the comics.

== Plot ==
The protagonist is an immortal creation of Narayan Debnath, who is a superhero as well as an intelligent detective. With his allies Bachchu and Bichchu, he solves some mysterious cases as well as fights those who create havoc.

== Characters ==
- Bantul
- Bachchhu
- Bichchhu
- Lambakarna
- Nitai
- Batobyal sir
- Noshu Ghosh
- Ghansa
- Boccha
- Daroga Babu

== Voice cast ==
- Naren Bhattacharya as Bantul
- Rupan Dasgupta as Bachchhu
- Arijit Bhadra as Bichchhu

== Episode ==
Episode No.	Title	Airing Date
1	Patton Tank	4 July 2010
2		11 July 2010
3	Coaching Class	18 July 2010
4		25 July 2010
5		1 August 2010
6		8 August 2010
7		15 August 2010
8		22 August 2010
9		29 August 2010
10		5 September 2010
11		12 September 2010
12		19 September 2010
13		26 September 2010
14		3 October 2010
15	Traner Taka Lopat	10 October 2010
16	Artha Sangraha	17 October 2010
17		24 October 2010
18	Colonel-er Bari-te Churi	31 October 2010
19	School-er Natok-e Gondogol	7 November 2010
20	Adbhut Prani	14 November 2010
21		21 November 2010
22		28 November 2010
23		5 December 2010
24	Aeroplane-er Karsaji	12 December 2010
25		19 December 2010
26		26 December 2010
27	Boro Din-er Upohar	2 January 2011
28	Cinema Dekha	9 January 2011
29		16 January 2011
30	Dinosaur-er Akraman	23 January 2011
31	B.G. Virus	30 January 2011
32	Adbhut Pranee - Lizard	6 February 2011
33	Take Makorsha	13 February 2011
34	Cricket Match	20 February 2011
35	School Sports	27 February 2011
36	Rajasthan-e Gondogol	6 March 2011
37	Chocolate Rasta	13 March 2011
38		20 March 2011
39	Goalkeeper Kidnap	27 March 2011
40	Bantul-er Pipe	3 April 2011
41		10 April 2011
42	Boxing Match	17 April 2011
43		24 April 2011
44		1 May 2011
45		8 May 2011
46		15 May 2011
47		22 May 2011
48		29 May 2011
49		5 June 2011
50		12 June 2011
51		19 June 2011
52		26 June 2011
53	Jungle Rahasya Prothom Bhag	3 July 2011
54	Jungle Rahasya Dwitiya Bhag	10 July 2011
55	Dakbanglay Bantul	17 July 2011
56		24 July 2011
57		31 July 2011
58	Captain Hugo-r Gopon Dera	7 August 2011
59	Bike Abhijan	14 August 2011
59		21 August 2011
60	Onorup-e Bantul	28 August 2011
61	Bantul Ar Oi Bishakto Pranee	4 September 2011
62	Bantul Ar Oi Bishakto Pranee Shesh - Bhag	11 September 2011
63	TikTikir Volbodol	18 September 2011
64	Planchet	25 September 2011
65	Murti Rahasya Prothom Bhag	2 October 2011
66	Murti Rahasya Shesh-Bhag	9 October 2011
67		16 October 2011
68	Jellystar Prothom – Bhag	23 October 2011
69	Jellystar Dwitiya – Bhag	30 October 2011
70		6 November 2011
71	Tibet-e Bantul	13 November 2011
72	Durga Pujay Gondogol Prothom Bhag	20 November 2011
73	Durga Pujay Gondogol Shesh Parba	27 November 2011
74		4 December 2011
75	Sumsum Desh-er Rajputro	11 December 2011
76	Bantul Ar Ek Odhbhut Gari Prothom Parba	18 December 2011
77	Bantul Ar Ek Odhbhut Gari Shesh Parba	25 December 2011
78	Ghatsilay Ghot Prothom Bhag	1 January 2012
79	Ghatsilay Ghot Shesh Bhag	8 January 2012
80	Koborkhanay Ke? Prothom-Bhag	15 January 2012
81	Koborkhanay Ke? Shesh-Bhag	22 January 2012
82	Abar Tornedo	29 January 2012
83	Singha Rahasya Prothom Bhag	5 February 2012
84	Singha Rahasya Shesh Bhag	12 February 2012
85	Pisima-r Bari Gurudev	19 February 2012
86	Raybari-r Rahasya Prothom Bhag	26 February 2012
87	Raybari-r Rahasya Shesh-Bhag	4 March 2012
88	Aladdin-er Sathe Bichchu	11 March 2012
89	Goldo Goendagiri	18 March 2012
90	Sundariteelar Bagh Prothom Parba	25 March 2012
91	Sundariteelar Bagh Shesh Parba	1 April 2012
92	Ebar Kand Chandannagar-e Prothom Parba	8 April 2012
93	Ebar Kand Chandannagar-e Shesh Parba	15 April 2012
94	Kumudbabur Ambagane Prothom Parba	22 April 2012
95	Kumudbabur Ambagane Shesh Parba	29 April 2012
96	Black Diamond Prothom – Bhag	6 May 2012
97	Black Diamond Shesh – Bhag	13 May 2012
98	Shadbhuter Kanda Prothom Bhag	20 May 2012
99	Shadbhuter Kanda Shesh Bhag	27 May 2012
100	Dracular Kobole Bantul Prothom Bhag	3 June 2012
101	Dracular Kobole Bantul Shesh Bhag	10 June 2012
102	Panda-r Sathe Bantul-ra	17 June 2012
103	Bhu-Shwarge Bantul	24 June 2012
104	Bhu-Shwarge Bantul Shesh Bhag	1 July 2012
105	Guptodhoner Khoje Bantul Prothom Bhag	8 July 2012
106	Guptodhoner Khoje Bantul Shesh Bhag	15 July 2012
107	Ojanagraher Pranee Prothom Bhag	22 July 2012
108	Ojanagraher Pranee Shesh Bhag	29 July 2012
109	Bantul O Robot Bondhu Prothom Bhag	5 August 2012
110	Bantul O Robot Bondhu Shesh Bhag	12 August 2012
111	Jilipi-r Pyanch	19 August 2012
112	Bantul-er Chobi Aka Prothom Bhag	26 August 2012
113	Bantul-er Chobi Aka Shesh Bhag	2 September 2012
114	Natok Rahasya Prothom Bhag	9 September 2012
115	Natok Rahasya Shesh Bhag	16 September 2012
116	Cinema-r Shooting Prothom Bhag	23 September 2012
117	Cinema-r Shooting Shesh Bhag	30 September 2012
118	Gurukand	7 October 2012
119	Moyur Bhila Prothom Bhag	14 October 2012
120	Moyur Bhila Shesh Bhag	21 October 2012
121	Remote Gari	28 October 2012
122	Kamalakanta-r Sona Prothom Bhag	4 November 2012
123		11 November 2012
124	Bandhej Bhoot	18 November 2012
125	Chunchobaji	25 November 2012
126	Biyebari-r Rahasya Prothom Bhag	2 December 2012
127	Biyebari-r Rahasya Shesh Bhag	9 December 2012
128		16 December 2012
129	Jadukar Jbod	23 December 2012
130	Bhutbanglay Bantul	30 December 2012
131	Magic Spray	6 January 2013
132	Bhut Bhaonta	13 January 2013
133	Bantul-er Kobjay Jolodoshuy-ra	20 January 2013
134	Damascus-er Nawab	27 January 2013
135	Bhoutik Singhasan	3 February 2013
136	Sundarmohan O Bantul	10 February 2013
137	Kalopahari-r Jungle-e Bantul Prothom Bhag	17 February 2013
138	Kalopahari-r Jungle-e Bantul Shesh Bhag	24 February 2013
139	Bhoutik Borjatri	3 March 2013
140	Adbhut Jontu	10 March 2013
141	Bacchu Bichchur Langcha	17 March 2013
142	Boxiganj-er Sei Cha-er Dokan	24 March 2013
143	Ashchorjo Pranir Deshe Bantul	31 March 2013
144	Khelar Mathe Gondogol	7 April 2013
145	Ajab Deshe Bantul Prothom Bhag	14 April 2013
146	Ajab Deshe Bantul Shesh Bhag	21 April 2013
147	Football Match	28 April 2013
148	Bhuter Deshe	5 May 2013
149	Urochithir Somadhan	12 May 2013
150	Alo Kankal	19 May 2013
151	Oitihasik Poisha	26 May 2013
152	Pimpra Rahasya	2 June 2013
153	Dinosaur Rahasya	9 June 2013
154	Agunmukho Janowar	16 June 2013
155	Bantul Ar Sei Kakatuya Prothom Bhag	23 June 2013
156	Bantul Ar Sei Kakatuya Shesh Bhag	30 June 2013
157	Ojana Uronto Jaan (Prothom Parba)	7 July 2013
158	Ojana Uronto Jaan (Shesh Parba)	14 July 2013
159	Bantul-er Ghordour	21 July 2013
160	Bantul O Gorilla Rahasya Prothom Bhag	28 July 2013
161	Bantul O Gorilla Rahasya Shesh Bhag	4 August 2013
162	Time Machine	11 August 2013
163	Bantul Ar Pakhir Khacha	18 August 2013
164	Alibaba-r Guptodhon	25 August 2013
165	Singha Debata O Bantul	1 September 2013
166	Sei Lokta O Bantul	8 September 2013
167	Bantul Ar Nandogopal-er Murti	15 September 2013
168	Baghmar Palowan O Bantul	22 September 2013
169	Hyena-r Hana	29 September 2013
170	Rahasya Ebar Misre	6 October 2013
171	Sahebgong-er Rahasye Bantul	13 October 2013
172	Bantul-er Notun Bondhu Prothom Bhag	20 October 2013
173	Bantul-er Notun Bondhu Shesh Bhag	27 October 2013
174	Bantul-er Hati	3 November 2013
175		10 November 2013
176	Boxar Bantul Prothom Bhag	17 November 2013
177	Boxar Bantul Shesh Bhag	24 November 2013
178	Rahasymoy Mancho Prothom Bhag	1 December 2013
179	Rahasymoy Mancho Shesh Bhag	8 December 2013
180	Urojahaj Hijack	15 December 2013
181	Bantul Vs. Gombuj Singh	22 December 2013
182	Gondar Gondogol	29 December 2013
183	Bhoyonkor Pakhir Kobole	5 January 2014
184	Bhuture Camera	12 January 2014
185		19 January 2014
186	Bantul Ar Yeti	26 January 2014
187	Bhuture Cricket Match	2 February 2014
188	Dracula Pahar	9 February 2014
189	Magic Ice Cream	16 February 2014
190	Bantul Ar Ashchorjo Jharna	23 February 2014
191	Bhuter Ketton	2 March 2014
192	Bantul Ebar Kolkata-y	9 March 2014
193	Cycle Race-e Bantul	16 March 2014
194	Sonar Khoje Bantul	23 March 2014
195		30 March 2014
196	Rahasyojonok Dim	6 April 2014
197	Hukom Singh-er Hukom	13 April 2014
198	Mokkhirakhsho O Bantul	20 April 2014
199	Kathabola putul	27 April 2014
200	Shondo Kand	4 May 2014
201	Bhoutik Ayna	11 May 2014
202	Dourbir Ar Bantul	18 May 2014
203	Chand-er Pathor	25 May 2014
204	Jungle Rahasya	1 June 2014
205	Bhoutik Jatra Pala	8 June 2014
206	Obhishopt Neel Hira	15 June 2014
207	Football Match	22 June 2014
208	Magician Ar Bantul-er Tokkor	29 June 2014
209	Bhuture Churi	6 July 2014
210	Biral Rahasya	13 July 2014
211	Pipra Kand	20 July 2014
212	Sonar Bol	27 July 2014
213	Bantul-er Lokkho Bhed	3 August 2014
214	Khambar Juddhe Bantul	10 August 2014
215	Medal Chor	17 August 2014
216	Jokhdabon Ar Bantul	24 August 2014
217	Puroskar-e Gondogol	31 August 2014
218	Ghuri Kand	7 September 2014
219	Rangapishi-r Goyna	14 September 2014
220	Makorsha Rahasya	21 September 2014
221	Harmonium Rahasya	28 September 2014
222	Pokkhi Rahasya	5 October 2014
223	Bichchur Onoshon	12 October 2014
224	Bantul Ar Michin	19 October 2014
225	Neelkontho Pakhi	26 October 2014
226	Akash Juddhe Bantul	2 November 2014
227	Ojana Shotru-r Mukhomukhi	9 November 2014
228	Mohor Churi	16 November 2014
229	Poka	23 November 2014
230	Jomidar-er Pretatma	30 November 2014
231	Obhishopt Kodai Bridge	7 December 2014
232	Kankra Akraman	14 December 2014
233	Bantul Kothay?	21 December 2014
234	Neel Saheb-der Sada Ghora	28 December 2014
235	Bhudeb Sen-er Dalil	4 January 2015
236	L10-er Shesher Shuru	11 January 2015
237	L10 Khtom	18 January 2015
238	Golapi Hire Rahasya	25 January 2015
239	Vampire Princess Ar Bantul	1 February 2015
240	Vampire Princess-er Mukhomukhi Bantul	8 February 2015
241	Girgitir Rong	15 February 2015
242	London-er Prince	22 February 2015
243	Sona Pachhar	1 March 2015
244	Ek-ti Rahasya Golpo	8 March 2015
245	Mahakash Juddhe Bantul	15 March 2015
246	Surajmal-er Kella	22 March 2015
247	Bhubonsomer Bagan	29 March 2015
248	Sonamanik	5 April 2015
249	Sinduker Chabi	12 April 2015
250	Patalpuri Rahasya	19 April 2015
251	Surong Rahasya	26 April 2015
252		3 May 2015
253	Magician Mama	10 May 2015
254	Mastermoshai	17 May 2015
255	Tipai	24 May 2015
256	Indur Puran	31 May 2015
257	Gojai-er Adbhut Rog	7 June 2015
258	Amro Kahini	14 June 2015
259	Louh Danob	21 June 2015
260	Ek Joker-er Golpo	28 June 2015
261	Football Kand	5 July 2015
262	Monimala Rahasya	12 July 2015
263	Ashchorjo Prodip	19 July 2015
264	Swonbor Sobhay Somossa	26 July 2015
265	Yeti Ki?	2 August 2015
266	Hanusmar-e Bantul	9 August 2015
267		16 August 2015
268		23 August 2015
269		30 August 2015
270	Murti Rahasya	6 September 2015
271	Bheen Groher Putul	13 September 2015
272		20 September 2015
273	Dui Bigha Jomi	27 September 2015
274	Guptodhon Rahasya	4 October 2015
275	Ojana Bondhurer Khoje	11 October 2015
276	Tanzania-y Bantul	18 October 2015
277	Gorilla Manush Rahasya Bhed	25 October 2015
278	Kali Pujor Rahasya	1 November 2015
279	Pathor Rahasya	8 November 2015
280		15 November 2015
281		22 November 2015
282	Abar Vampire Princess	29 November 2015
283	Agnigoloker Mukhomukhi Bantul	6 December 2015
284		13 December 2015
285	Bantul-er Durgo Joy	20 December 2015
286	New Year Cake	27 December 2015
287		3 January 2016
288	Mimir Muktoral Mala	10 January 2016
289	Ghurir Deshe	17 January 2016
290	Swadhinatar Sainik	24 January 2016
291	Niruddesh Rahasya	31 January 2016
292	Noshi-r Kouto	7 February 2016
293	Hangor Debota	14 February 2016
294	Ek-ti Brishti-r Dine	21 February 2016
295	Football Match	28 February 2016
296	Tornado-r Mukhomukhi Bantul	6 March 2016
297	Trapeze-r Khela	13 March 2016
298	Bagh Debota	20 March 2016
299	Darogababu-r Goendagiri	27 March 2016
300	Udas Baul	3 April 2016
301		10 April 2016
302	Panja Ladai	17 April 2016
303		24 April 2016
304	Oloukik Pathor	1 May 2016
305	Bantul-er Pyanch	8 May 2016
306	Kidnapper Bantul	15 May 2016
307	Jungle-e Rahasya	22 May 2016
308	Ashchorjo Banomanush	29 May 2016
309	Kankal-er Magic	5 June 2016
310		12 June 2016
311	Changu	19 June 2016
312	Shad-der Bhelki	26 June 2016
313		3 July 2016
314		10 July 2016
315		17 July 2016
316		24 July 2016
317		31 July 2016
318		7 August 2016
319		14 August 2016
320	Bagh-er Deray Bantul	21 August 2016
321	Baiduryomani Rahasya	28 August 2016
322	Football Player	4 September 2016
323	Bantul Ar Kalo Hyena	11 September 2016
324	Bantul Ar Oi Dustu Makorsha	18 September 2016
325	Mushik Puran	25 September 2016
326		2 October 2016
327	Robot Bantul	9 October 2016
328	Bhuture Bhoot	16 October 2016
329	Pecha-r Pyanch	23 October 2016
330	Football Khela	30 October 2016
331	Khoobala Gang-er Mukhomukhi	6 November 2016
332		13 November 2016
333	Hire-r Khonir Map	20 November 2016
334	Gof Churi	27 November 2016
335		4 December 2016
336		11 December 2016
337	Atmaram Khachachara	18 December 2016
338	Cake Kand	25 December 2016
339	Jungle Bhromon	1 January 2017
340	Adbhut Abhijan-e Bantul	8 January 2017
341	Adrishyo Rohossho	15 January 2017
342	Bhuter Deray Bantul	22 January 2017
343		29 January 2017
344	Golden Chariot	5 February 2017
345	Robot Dakati	12 February 2017
346	Chimpu Nikhoj	19 February 2017
347	Nosuda Fire Elo	26 February 2017
348	Pahar Chura-y Rahasya	5 March 2017
349	Timi Rahasya	12 March 2017
350	Kumir Debota	19 March 2017
351	Cactus Snake	26 March 2017
352	Bojro Danob	2 April 2017
353	Pass Fail	9 April 2017
354	Raybari-r Guptodhon	16 April 2017
355	Comics Doitto	23 April 2017
356		30 April 2017
357		7 May 2017
358	Guptodhon	14 May 2017
359	Hanuman Palowan	21 May 2017
360	David Shaheber Hospital	28 May 2017
361		4 June 2017
362	Adbhut Koushol	11 June 2017
363	TikTiki Dragon	18 June 2017
364	Dracular Shakti	25 June 2017
365		2 July 2017
366		9 July 2017
367	Satyi Bhuter Golpo	16 July 2017
368		23 July 2017
369	Sammohoner khela	30 July 2017
370	Medal	6 August 2017
371		13 August 2017
372		20 August 2017
373		27 August 2017
374		3 September 2017
375		10 September 2017
376		17 September 2017
377		24 September 2017
378	Bantul Ar Saheb-er Atma	1 October 2017
379		8 October 2017
380		15 October 2017
381		22 October 2017
382		29 October 2017
383		5 November 2017
384		12 November 2017
385		19 November 2017
386		26 November 2017
387		3 December 2017
388		10 December 2017
389		17 December 2017
390		24 December 2017
391	Adbhut Roshmi	31 December 2017
392		7 January 2018
393		14 January 2018
394	Joggo Jobab	21 January 2018
395	Bhayankor Shorojontro	28 January 2018
396	Captain Sark-er Hamla	4 February 2018
397	Manush kheko machh	11 February 2018
398	Bhuture Chithi	18 February 2018
399	Beral-er Anchr	25 February 2018
400	Chita	4 March 2018
401	Tandob Doittyo-r Golpo	11 March 2018
402		18 March 2018
403	Bagh Rahasya	25 March 2018
404	Darpannagori-r Rupkotha	1 April 2018
405	Bhubongor-er Ghora	8 April 2018
406	Shyam Sundar-er Mrittur Rahasya	15 April 2018
407		22 April 2018
408	Din Dayal-er Shiksha	29 April 2018
409	Kaktarua bhoot	6 May 2018
410		13 May 2018
411	Ashchorjo Football	20 May 2018
412	Chandanpur Rahasya	27 May 2018
413	Kankal Kand	3 June 2018
414	Har Churi	10 June 2018
415		17 June 2018
416	Ghurnijhor	24 June 2018
417	Singha Debota Rahasya	1 July 2018
418	Porosh Pathor	8 July 2018
419	Hari Madhab-er Proyoshchitto	15 July 2018
420		22 July 2018
421	Shaper Deshe Bantul	29 July 2018
422	Bondho Darojar Rahasya	5 August 2018
423	Anubis	12 August 2018
424	Bhanugor Abhijan	19 August 2018
425	Girgit Rahasya	26 August 2018
426	Teacher's Day Celebration	2 September 2018
427	Ashol Nokol	9 September 2018
428	Kapalik-er Golpo	16 September 2018
429	Bantul Vs. Mecho Bhoot	23 September 2018
430	Buddhite Milay Bishoy	30 September 2018
431	Bondho Ghori	7 October 2018
432	Pahari Khade Durghotona	14 October 2018
433	Pocketmar Pakrao	21 October 2018
434	Dragon Kand	28 October 2018
435	Missile-r Kobole Bantul	4 November 2018
436	Nilgonj-er Rahasya	11 November 2018
437	Sonar Dweep Mambania	18 November 2018
438	Utopay Agnikando	25 November 2018
439	Radha Madhab-er Taka Churi	2 December 2018
440	Gorachand Ontardhan Rahasya	9 December 2018
441	Onko Bhoot	16 December 2018
442	Kalo Angur Rahasya	23 December 2018
443	Hire Rahasya	30 December 2018
444	Pakhi Chor-er Golpo	6 January 2019
445		13 January 2019
446	Dulkipara-y Bagh Rahasya	20 January 2019
447	Moja Bhoot	27 January 2019
448	Bigyani Mohan Bhattar Missile	3 February 2019
449	Bishakto Jol	10 February 2019
450	Shakalur Angti	17 February 2019
451	Sirikajor-er Murti Rahasya	24 February 2019
452	Bantul O Sei Kukurta	3 March 2019
453	Shooting-e Shihoron	10 March 2019
454	Ashchorjo Bol	17 March 2019
455	Oloukik Sei Chobi	24 March 2019
456	Bantul O Chaklulal	31 March 2019
457	Buddhite Boro Na Shokti Boro	7 April 2019
458	Aashchorjo Phool	14 April 2019
459	Nogen Khudur Mohor	21 April 2019
460	Gondare Gondogol	28 April 2019
461	Bantul O Rajkonna Fulmoti	5 May 2019
462	Bantul Jabe Phutuse	12 May 2019
463	Trapez Dweep-er Dragon	19 May 2019
464	Ajab Desher Gojb Sheikh	26 May 2019
465	Dhulguri Rahasya	2 June 2019
466	Sworno Jahaj Uddhar	9 June 2019
467	Blue Diamond Rahasya	16 June 2019
468	Odrisyo Chor	23 June 2019
469	Hobo Hati-r Kobole Bantul	30 June 2019
470	Rajkumar Suryer Uddhar Rahasya	7 July 2019
471	Suryakanta Monir Khoje Bantul	14 July 2019
472	Bantul-er Jol-e Dakater Dol	21 July 2019
473	Maharaj Shaktidombher Darpachurno	28 July 2019
474	Somudragor-er Bhoot Rahasya	4 August 2019
475	Bantul O Mohishashur	11 August 2019
476	Gorillar Rahasya Bhed	18 August 2019
477	Sonar Bol	25 August 2019
478	Haricharan-er Will Rahasya	1 September 2019
479	Botbyal Sir-er Medal Churi	8 September 2019
480		15 September 2019
481	Bantul O Poltu	22 September 2019
482	Bantul-er Buddhir Khel	29 September 2019
483	Bantul O L10 -er Juddho	6 October 2019
484	Bhuture Chobi	13 October 2019
485	Somudragor-e Madanmohan Rahasya	20 October 2019
486	Necklace Rahasya	27 October 2019
487	Bhuture Bok	3 November 2019
488	Devi Leader-er Golpo	10 November 2019
489	Bantul O Ashchorjo Dweep	17 November 2019
490	Bhuture Durbin	24 November 2019
491	Bantul O Hire-r Angti	1 December 2019
492	Bantul O Bishwa Dour Protijogita	8 December 2019
493	Jomidar Bireshwar Babu-r Mrittur Rahasya	15 December 2019
494	Jol Doitto	22 December 2019
495	Sahebkuthir Bagh Rahasya	29 December 2019
496	Hati O Hire Rahasya	5 January 2020
497	Sadhu Baba-r Murti Kand	12 January 2020
498	Bantul O Machi Rahasya	19 January 2020
499	Bantul O Arjun Rahasya	26 January 2020
500	Jadukar-er Boi	2 February 2020
501	Neel Pahari Rahasya	9 February 2020
502	Madhabpur-er Trishul Rahasya	16 February 2020
503	Ayna Rahasya	23 February 2020
504	Bantul-er Bhuter Golpo	1 March 2020
505	Dragon Deshe Bantul	8 March 2020
506	Bhooter Rajosobhay Bantul	15 March 2020
507	Bantul O Rajkumari Chandramala Uddhar Rahasya	22 March 2020
508	Nitai-r Biye	29 March 2020
509	Bantul O Somudro Doitto	5 April 2020
510	Guptodhoner Noksha	12 April 2020
511	Hire Churi	19 April 2020
512	Raja Toras-er Durmulyo Hire	26 April 2020
513	Bheen Groher Shompod	3 May 2020
514	Torobari Rahasya	10 May 2020
515	Rajendraprasad-er Hotya Rahasya	17 May 2020
516	Bantul O Mohadanob	24 May 2020
517	Bantul O Bagh Debota	31 May 2020
518	Shombhonath-er Ashrom	7 June 2020
519	Jonakpur Rahasya	14 June 2020
520	Bantul O Sada Payra	21 June 2020
521	Danob Loke Bantul	28 June 2020
522	Bichchur Bodhday	5 July 2020
523	Golokpur Rahasya	12 July 2020
524	Gari Rahasya	19 July 2020
525	Nawabgonj Rahasya	26 July 2020
526	Ulkapindo O Bantul	2 August 2020
527	Indumala Uddhar Rahasya	9 August 2020
528	Lal Kankrar Deshe Bantul	16 August 2020
529	Misti Rahasya	23 August 2020
530	Sirin Groher Kahini	30 August 2020
531	Gondogram-e Gondogol	6 September 2020
532	Lokkho Bhed	13 September 2020
533	Rahasymoy	20 September 2020
534	Sommohon-er Kobole	27 September 2020
535	Shaktiman Raja	4 October 2020
536	Bantul O Golpo Dadu	11 October 2020
537	Adbhut Todon	18 October 2020
538	Goenda-r Golpo	25 October 2020
539	Boxar Bantul	1 November 2020
540	Khuni Ke	8 November 2020
541	Ray Bari-r Mohor	15 November 2020
542	Jolonto Timi	22 November 2020
543	Chheldhorar Dol	29 November 2020
544	Hire-r Angti	6 December 2020
545	Bichchur Borolok Hoya	13 December 2020
546	Hire Churir Porda Fash	20 December 2020
547	Nephrodet-er Beral	27 December 2020
548	Bhuter Football	3 January 2021
549	Bhoot Rahasya	10 January 2021
550	Rahasymoy Neeldighi	17 January 2021
551	Bantul O Daku Shera Singh	24 January 2021
552	Chandnigor Rahasya	31 January 2021
553	Angel Grohe Bantul	7 February 2021
554	Roshikpur Rahasya	14 February 2021
555	Jungle Kand	21 February 2021
