= List of English-language television channels in India =

This is a list of English language television channels aired in India.

== Government-owned channels ==
Channel	Launch	Paid/Free	Video	Owner
DD India	1995	Free	SD+HD	Doordarshan
DD Sports	1998	Free	SD+HD	Doordarshan

=== Upcoming channel ===
Channel	Launch	Owner	Notes
Night 24x7	TBA	Star (Disney+) & The Tata Group	Launching Soon, Gets MIB only 2026, TBA will become after get's Ministry of Health and Family Welfare.

== General entertainment ==
Channel	Launch	Fresh Content	Paid/Free	Video	Owner
Colors Infinity	2015	No	Paid	SD+HD	JioStar (Replacing Star (Disney+) soon)
Disney International HD	2017	No	Paid	HD	JioStar (Replacing Star (Disney+) soon)

=== Defunct channels ===
Channel	Launch	Defunct	Owner
Star World	1991	2023	JioStar
FX	2007	2017	JioStar
Fox Crime	2012	2015	JioStar
Star World Premiere HD	2013	2023	JioStar
Comedy Central	2012	2025	JioStar
BBC Entertainment	2007	2012	BBC
Big CBS Spark	2010	2013	Reliance Broadcast Network Limited and CBS Studios International
Big CBS Prime	2010	2013	Reliance Broadcast Network Limited and CBS Studios International
Big CBS Love	2011	2013	Reliance Broadcast Network Limited and CBS Studios International
Big RTL Thrill	2012	2014	Reliance Broadcast Network Limited and RTL Group
AXN	1999	2020	Culver Max Entertainment
Zone Reality	2003	2011	CBS
ITV Choice	2012	2016	ITV plc
Woman TV	2023	2024	Media Worldwide Limited
Multi TV	2024	2026	Doddanekundi Network Services and Reliance Digital

== Movies ==
Channel	Launch	Paid/Free	Video	Owner
Star Movies	1994	Paid	SD+HD	JioStar
Star Movies Select	2015	Paid	SD+HD	JioStar
Sony Pix	2006	Paid	SD+HD	Culver Max Entertainment
Movies Now	2010	Paid	SD+HD	Times Network
Romedy Now	2013	Paid	SD	Times Network
MNX	2017	Paid	SD+HD	Times Network
MN +	2015	Paid	HD	Times Network

=== Defunct channels ===
Channel	Launch	Defunct	Owner
Zee Studio	2000	2018	Zee Entertainment Enterprises
&privé HD	2017	2026	Zee Entertainment Enterprises
PIX System	2015	2027	Bhartiya MySky Limited
Sony Le Plex HD	2016	2018	Culver Max Entertainment
Turner Classic Movies	1994	2012	Warner Bros. Discovery India
HBO India	2000	2020	Warner Bros. Discovery India
WB Channel	2009	2020	Warner Bros. Discovery India
HBO Hits	2013	2015	Warner Bros. Discovery India
HBO Defined	2013	2015	Warner Bros. Discovery India
Lumiere Movies	2009	2012	Warner Bros. Discovery India
Fox Action Movies	2012	2013	JioStar
Star Movies Action	2013	2017	JioStar
UTV World Movies	2008	2014	JioStar
MGM	2008	2015	Metro-Goldwyn-Mayer

== Kids ==
Channel	Launch	Paid/Free	Video	Owner
Cartoon Network	1995	Paid	SD+HD	Warner Bros. Discovery India
Pogo	2004	Paid	SD	Warner Bros. Discovery India
Discovery Kids	2012	Paid	SD	Warner Bros. Discovery India
Disney Channel	2004	Paid	SD+HD	JioStar
Super Hungama	2004	Paid	SD	JioStar
Disney Junior	2012	Paid	SD	JioStar
Nick HD+	2015	Paid	HD	JioStar
Nick Jr.	2013	Paid	SD	JioStar
Cbeebies	2020	Paid	SD	BBC Studios

=== Defunct channels ===
Channel	Launch	Defunct	Owner
Jetix	2007	2009	JioStar
Disney XD	2009	2019	JioStar
Marvel HQ	2019	2022	JioStar
BabyTV	2006	2023	JioStar
Animax India	2004	2017	Culver Max Entertainment
Spacetoon India	2005	2011	Spacetoon International
Toonami	2015	2018	Warner Bros. Discovery India
ZeeQ	2010	Zee Entertainment Enterprises	

=== Audio tracks ===
- ETV Bal Bharat (Formerly)
- Gubbare (Sometimes in place of Malayalam)
- Nickelodeon (Formerly)

== Infotainment & lifestyle ==
Channel	Launch	Paid/Free	Video	Owner
Discovery Channel	1995	Paid	SD+HD	Warner Bros. Discovery India
Animal Planet	1999	Paid	SD+HD	Warner Bros. Discovery India
TLC	2004	Paid	SD+HD	Warner Bros. Discovery India
Discovery Science	2010	Paid	SD	Warner Bros. Discovery India
Discovery Turbo	2010	Paid	SD	Warner Bros. Discovery India
Investigation Discovery	2020	Paid	SD+HD	Warner Bros. Discovery India
National Geographic	1998	Paid	SD+HD	JioStar
Nat Geo Wild	2009	Paid	SD+HD	JioStar
History TV18	2011	Paid	SD+HD	Network18 Group
Sony BBC Earth	2017	Paid	SD+HD	BBC Studios & Culver Max Entertainment
Good Times	2007	Paid	SD	Lifestyle and Media Broadcasting Limited
Zee Zest	2010	Paid	SD+HD	Zee Entertainment Enterprises
Travelxp	2011	Paid	SD+HD	Celebrities Management Private Limited
Foodxp	2022	Paid	SD	Celebrities Management Private Limited
FashionTV	1997	Free	SD+HD	Michel Adam Lisowski

=== Defunct channels ===
Channel	Launch	Defunct	Owner
StarLife	2008	2025	JioStar
Nat Geo People	2014	2021	JioStar
Zee Trendz	2003	2014	Zee Entertainment Enterprises
Living Foodz	2015	2020	Zee Entertainment Enterprises
Living Travelz	2017	2017	Zee Entertainment Enterprises
Green TV India	2014	2021	Nomad Films Ltd

== Music ==
=== Defunct channels ===
Channel	Launch	Defunct	Owner
9XO	2012	2020	9X Media
Nat Geo Music	2007	2019	JioStar
VH1	2005	2025	JioStar

== News & Business ==
=== National News channels ===
Channel	Launch	Paid/Free	Video	Owner
NDTV 24x7	2003	Paid	SD+HD	NDTV
NDTV World	2024	Paid	SD	NDTV
Times Now	2006	Paid	SD+HD	The Times Group
Times Now World	2019	Paid	SD	The Times Group
CNN-News18	2005	Paid	SD+HD	Network18 and Warner Bros. Discovery India
India Today	2003	Paid	SD	Living Media India
NewsX	2008	Paid	SD	ITV Network
NewsX World	2025	Paid	SD	ITV Network
Republic TV	2017	Free	SD	Republic Media Network
WION	2016	Paid	SD	Zee Entertainment Enterprises

=== Domestic channels ===
Channel	Launch	Paid/Free	Video	Owner
North East Live	2013	Free	SD	Pride East Entertainment Private Limited

=== International News channels ===
Channel	Launch	Paid/Free	Video	Owner
BBC World News	1995	Paid	SD	BBC Studios
RT	2005	Free	SD	ANO TV-Novosti
France 24	2006	Free	SD	France Médias Monde

- ABC Australia
- Al Jazeera English
- Bloomberg Television
- CNA
- CNN
- Deutsche Welle
- NHK World

=== Business News Channels ===
Channel	Launch	Paid/Free	Video	Owner
CNBC TV18	1999	Paid	SD+HD	Network18
NDTV Profit	2005	Paid	SD	NDTV
ET Now	2009	Paid	SD	The Times Group

=== Defunct channels ===
Channel	Launch	Defunct	Owner
BTVi	2008	2019	Business Broadcast News Pvt. Ltd
Magicbricks Now	2015	2017	The Times Group
Mirror Now	2017	2025	The Times Group
Tiranga TV	2019	2019	Veecon Media and Broadcasting Pvt Ltd

== Sports ==
Channel	Launch	Paid/Free	Video	Owner
Sony Sports Ten 1	2002	Paid	SD+HD	Culver Max Entertainment
Sony Sports Ten 2	2006	Paid	SD+HD	Culver Max Entertainment
Sony Sports Ten 5	2012	Paid	SD+HD	Culver Max Entertainment
Star Sports 1	1996	Paid	SD+HD	JioStar
Star Sports 2	2013	Paid	SD+HD	JioStar
Star Sports Select 1	2016	Paid	SD+HD	JioStar
Star Sports Select 2	2016	Paid	SD+HD	JioStar
Eurosport	2017	Paid	SD+HD	Warner Bros. Discovery India
Unite8 Sports 2	2026	Paid	SD+HD	Zee Entertainment Enterprises

=== Defunct channels ===
Channel	Launch	Defunct	Owner
Zee Sports	2005	2010	Zee Entertainment Enterprises
Neo Sports	2006	2018	Nimbus Communications
Neo Cricket	2008	2012	Nimbus Communications
Neo Prime	2012	2018	Nimbus Communications
Sports18 1	2022	2025	Viacom18
Sports18 2	2023	2025	Viacom18
Sports18 3	2023	2025	Viacom18
Sony ESPN	2015	2020	Culver Max Entertainment & ESPN
Sony Ten Golf HD	2015	2018	Culver Max Entertainment

== Defunct ==
- Boomerang
- CGTN
- Fox Sports News
- Star Sports 4
- Trace Sports

== See also ==
- List of HD channels in India
