= Warner Bros. Discovery Asia-Pacific =

Asia-Pacific regional hub of Warner Bros. Discovery

Skydance Asia-Pacific, Middle East and North Africa
- Type: Division
- Predecessor: ViacomCBS Networks EMEAA (2019–2022); Paramount Networks EMEAA (2022–2026); ViacomCBS Networks UK & Australia (2020–2022); Paramount Networks UK & Australia (2022–2026); Warner Bros. Discovery Asia-Pacific (1994–2022); WarnerMedia Entertainment Networks Asia Pacific (1989–2022); Time Warner Entertainment Australia (1989–2001)
- Founded: 1 January 1989; 37 years ago (original); 8 April 2022; 4 years ago (as Warner Bros. Discovery Asia-Pacific); 6 October 2026; 47 days ago (as Skydance Asia-Pacific, Middle East and North Africa)
- Headquarters: Singapore
- Area served: Asia-Pacific; MENA
- Key people: James Gibbons (President – Australia, New Zealand and Japan); Clement Schwebig (President – Southeast Asia, South Korea and India); Anna Pak Burdin (general manager)
- Products: Broadcasting; cable television; video streaming
- Owner: Skydance
- Parent: Skydance Global Content Sales
- Subsidiaries: Warner Bros. Discovery India; Skydance Japan; JTBC (5.72%) (Note: Initial public offering with JoongAng Group and other companies.)

Skydance Asia-Pacific, Middle East and North Africa (APAC and MENA) is a division of Skydance that operates several television channels in Asia, Australasia, Middle East and North Africa along with the Discovery+ streaming service.

In April 2022, WarnerMedia Entertainment Networks Asia-Pacific (founded in 1989) merged with Discovery Asia-Pacific (founded in 1994) after their owners, WarnerMedia (then owned by AT&T before being spun off), merged with Discovery, Inc. It has consequently been announced that Discovery+, which is currently available in India and was available in the Philippines, would be merged with HBO Go, to form simply Max on 19 November 2024.

== Current assets ==
- Animal Planet
  - Australia & New Zealand
  - India
  - Japan
- Asian Food Network
- Cartoon Network
  - Arabic
  - Australia & New Zealand
  - India
  - Japan
  - Korea
  - MENA
  - Pakistan
  - Philippines
- Cartoonito
  - MENA
  - South Korea
  - Taiwan
- Cinemax
- CNN US (distribution)
  - CNN Arabic
  - CNN International Asia Pacific
    - CNN-News18
    - CNN Indonesia (Indonesia; licensed to Trans Media)
  - Turkey
- Discovery Asia
- Discovery Channel
  - Australia & New Zealand
  - MENA
  - India
  - DTamil
  - Japan
  - Korea
  - Taiwan
  - Turkey
- Discovery Science
  - India
- DMAX
  - Discovery Turbo (India)
  - Turkey
  - Discovery Turbo Australia & New Zealand
- Discovery Kids India
- Food Network
  - Turkey
- HBO
  - HBO Family
  - HBO Hits
  - HBO Signature
- HGTV
  - Australia & New Zealand
- HLN (distribution)
- Investigation Discovery
  - Australia & New Zealand
  - India
  - Turkey
- MTV
  - India
  - Japan
  - Taiwan
- Nickelodeon
  - India
  - Sonic
  - Malaysia
  - Philippines
- Nick Jr.
  - India
  - MENA
- Nicktoons
  - MENA
- TLC
  - Australia
  - India
  - MENA
  - Turkey
- Travel Channel
  - India
  - Turkey
  - Australia & New Zealand
- Warner TV APAC and MENA
  - TCM MENA

=== Regional-specific ===
- Boing (MENA)
- CNN International South Asia
- Fatafeat (MENA)
- LaLa TV (Japan)
- Living (New Zealand)
- Mondo TV (Japan)
- Movieplus (Japan)
- Pogo (India)
- Network Ten Pty Limited (Australia)
  - Network 10
    - Sydney, Northern NSW & Gold Coast, Southern NSW & ACT
    - Melbourne and Regional Victoria
    - Brisbane and Regional Queensland
    - Adelaide
    - Perth
  - 10 Drama
  - 10 Comedy
  - Nickelodeon
  - Gecko TV
- Tabi Channel (Japan)
- World Heritage Channel

== Former assets ==
=== Defunct ===
- 7food network (licensed to Seven West Media)
- 9Rush (joint with Nine; Australia)
- Boomerang (Asia)
- Boomerang (Australia)
- Breeze TV
- CMT replaced by revival of CMC)
- DKids
- Nickelodeon
  - Japan
  - MENA
  - Pakistan
  - KiZmom (Korea)
  - Nick HD+ (India)
  - Australia & New Zealand (Note: in Australia, branded as Nick to differentiate it from the free-to-air channel of the same name)
- Nick Jr.
- Comedy Central Asia
- Comedy Central Australia & New Zealand
- NickMusic
- MTV Asia
  - China
  - SBS M
  - MENA
  - Pakistan
  - Vietnam
- MTV Australia & New Zealand (Note: localised feed replaced by a time-shifted version of the European feed in 2023.)
  - MTV Hits Australia & New Zealand
  - MTV Music (replaced by revival of MTV Hits)
  - Club MTV
  - MTV Classic (replaced by MTV 80s)
  - MTV 80s
  - MTV 90s
  - MTV 00s
- Spike
- Spree TV (50%)
- VH1 Australia (replaced by MTV Classic)
- China Entertainment Television (36%)
- Discovery Kids (Asia)
- The Edge TV
- EVE
- Food Network (New Zealand) - replaced by Investigation Discovery
- HBO (New Zealand)
- Imagine TV
- Imagine Showbiz
- Jeet Prime
- Oh!K
- Lumiere Movies
- Mondo Mah-jong TV
- Newshub
- Paramount Channel (Asia)
- Paramount Network (Philippines)
- Paramount Network (Vietnam)
- Real
- Red by HBO
- SBS Food Network (licensed to Special Broadcasting Service)
- Setanta Sports Asia
- Tabi Tele
- Toonami (Asia)
- Toonami (India)
- TruTV (Asia)
- Turner Classic Movies (Asia)
- WB Channel (India)

=== Divested ===
- Boom - sold to MVTV (Thailand)
- Discovery New Zealand
  - Bravo (joint with Comcast NBCUniversal; New Zealand)
  - Eden
  - Rush
  - Three

== Carriage disputes with StarHub ==
On 30 May 2018, StarHub announced their plans to discontinue 11 channels from Discovery's portfolio due to disputes of "recent carriage renewal talks and hinges on a disagreement over fees" with Discovery.

On 30 June 2018, Discovery Channel, Animal Planet, TLC, Discovery Asia, Discovery Science, Eurosport and Setanta Sports were let go of the channel line-up and were replaced by Gusto TV, CuriosityStream, Travelxp, Makeful, Fight Sports, GEM TV, and Colors Tamil. The other four channels that were part of the legacy Scripps contract with Discovery, namely HGTV, Asian Food Channel, Food Network and Travel Channel, ceased transmission on 31 August 2018.

In October 2023, StarHub has relaunched Discovery Channel and HGTV, joining with the Warner Bros. Discovery channel line-up that include CNN International, Cartoonito, Cartoon Network, HBO, HBO On Demand, HBO Signature, HBO Family, HBO Hits and Cinemax.

== See also ==
- Warner Bros. Discovery Americas
- Warner Bros. Discovery EMEA
