= WB Channel =

Indian pay television network

- Country: India
- Broadcast area: Indian subcontinent
- Headquarters: Mumbai, Maharashtra

Programming
- Language: English
- Picture format: 16:9 SDTV

Ownership
- Owner: Warner Bros. Discovery India
- Sister channels: Animal Planet; Cartoon Network; Cartoon Network HD+; CNN International; CNN News18; Discovery Channel; Discovery HD World; Discovery Jeet; Discovery Kids; Discovery Science; Discovery Tamil; Discovery Turbo; Eurosport; Eurosport HD; HBO; HBO Defined; HBO HD; HBO Hits; Imagine TV; Imagine Showbiz; Investigation Discovery; ID HD; Jeet Prime; Jeet Prime HD; Lumiere Movies; Pogo; Real; TCM; Toonami; TLC; TLC HD

History
- Launched: 15 March 2009
- Closed: 15 December 2020

WB Channel (short for Warner Bros.) was an Indian pay television channel. It was launched on 15 March 2009 by Warner Bros. Discovery India (then TimeWarner) through its international division exclusively for the Indian subcontinent. The channel featured a mix of Hollywood films and (formerly) television dramas from the Warner Bros. Vault. The channel was shut down on 15 December 2020 a little after midnight interrupting the airing of the Area 51 movie. The channel was closed along with HBO India.

== Closure ==
WarnerMedia announced on 15 October 2020 that HBO South Asia and WB Channel would close down on 15 December 2020. The HBO channel would no longer be available in India and Pakistan after this date, while WB Channel ceased to exist in India, Bangladesh, Pakistan and the Maldives.

HBO India had closed down at midnight with the last movie on the SD channel being Mad Max: Fury Road (completed 1 hour before the shutdown) and the last movie on the HD channel being Memoirs of a Geisha. HBO Pakistan was also closed down at midnight.
