= List of channels owned by Warner Bros. Discovery India =

This is list of channels that are owned by Warner Bros. Discovery in India.

== Operating channels ==
Warner Bros. Discovery India currently owns and operates 19 TV channels (12 SD, 7 HD) across English, Hindi, Tamil, Telugu, Malayalam, Kannada, Marathi and Bengali.

Channel	Logo	Launched	Language(s)	Category	SD/HD availability	Notes	Reference
Cartoon Network		1 May 1995	English; Hindi; Tamil; Telugu; Malayalam; Kannada	Kids	SD & HD (as Cartoon Network HD+)	1st kids channel in India and oldest among other sister channels.	
Pogo		1 January 2004	Hindi; Tamil; Telugu; Malayalam; Kannada; Marathi	Kids	SD		
Cartoon Network HD+		18 May 2018	Hindi; English; Tamil; Telugu	Kids	HD & SD (as Cartoon Network)	Different feed from Cartoon Network.	
CNN International		1 January 2000	English	News	SD		
Discovery Channel		15 August 1995; 5 March 2010 (HD feed)	Hindi; English; Tamil; Telugu; Malayalam; Kannada; Bengali; Marathi	Wildlife and Information	SD & HD		
Animal Planet		29, March 1999 (SD Feed) 23, July 2014 (HD feed)	Hindi; English; Tamil Telugu	Wildlife and Information	SD & HD		
TLC		October 2004 (SD) 2 June 2014 (HD)	English and Hindi	Knowledge and Lifestyle	SD & HD	Formerly Discovery Travel & Living	
Discovery Science		January, 2010	English and Hindi	Knowledge and Lifestyle	SD		
Discovery Turbo		January, 2010	English only	Knowledge and Lifestyle	SD		
Discovery Kids		7 August 2012	Hindi; Tamil; Telugu; Malayalam; Kannada; Marathi (Coming Soon)	Kids	SD		
Discovery Asia		February 2005	Various	General Entertainment	HD		
Investigation Discovery		1 June 2014 (SD) 31 January 2018 (HD)	English and Hindi	General Entertainment	SD & HD	Formerly Discovery Jeet (2018-2019) and Jeet Prime (2019-2020).	
Eurosport		6 February 2017 (SD & HD)	English	Sports	SD & HD	Formerly Dsport.	
DTamil		1 April 2003	Tamil	Hollywood entertainment and Information	SD	Formerly Discovery12 and Discovery Tamil.	

== Defunct channels ==
Channel	Discontinued	Launched	Replaced By	Language	SD/HD availability	Category	Reference
Real	March 2010	2 March 2009		Hindi	SD	General Entertainment	
Imagine Showbiz	September 2011	15 August 2008		Hindi	SD	Music	
Imagine TV	11 May 2012	21 January 2008		Hindi	SD	General Entertainment	
Lumiere Movies	5 July 2012	21 January 2008		English and Hindi	SD	Movies	
HBO Defined	31 December 2015	21 February 2013		English	SD	Movies	
HBO Hits	31 December 2015	21 February 2013		Hindi and English	SD & HD	Movies	
HBO Hits HD	31 December 2015	21 February 2013	HBO HD	Hindi and English	SD & HD	Movies	
Investigation Discovery	12 February 2018	1 June 2014	Discovery Jeet	Hindi and English	SD & HD	General Entertainment	
Toonami	15 May 2018	26 February 2015	Cartoon Network HD+	Hindi and English	SD	Kids	
Jeet Prime	13 January 2020	12 February 2018	Investigation Discovery	Hindi and English	SD & HD	General Entertainment	
WB Channel	15 December 2020	15 March 2009		English	SD	Movies	
HBO	15 December 2020	22 March 2000		English	SD & HD	Movies	
