= Warner Bros. Discovery India =

Division of Warner Bros. Discovery Asia-Pacific

- Formerly: Turner Broadcasting System India (1989–2020); Warner Media Entertainment Networks India (2020–2022)
- Company type: Division
- Predecessor: WarnerMedia India (2019-2022); Discovery India (1995–2022)
- Founded: 1995; 31 years ago 2022; 4 years ago (merger with Discovery India)
- Headquarters: India
- Area served: India
- Products: Broadcasting; cable television; video streaming
- Parent: Warner Bros. Discovery International

Warner Bros. Discovery India (also known as WBD or WBDI) is a division of Warner Bros. Discovery Asia-Pacific that operates several television channels in India. The division is responsible for delivering a range of content across various genres, catering to diverse audience interests. Additionally, Warner Bros. Discovery India manages the Discovery+ streaming service, which offers on-demand access to a variety of programming.

The company was initially established as two separate entities: Turner International India and Discovery India, both launched in 1995. Following the merger of their parent companies in the United States, these two entities subsequently combined to form Warner Bros. Discovery India, thereby consolidating their operations in the Indian media market.

== History ==
=== Turner International India (TimeWarner) ===
In 1995 Turner came to India with the launch of Cartoon Network, the first kids channel in India.

In 2004 the company launched Pogo.Turner's CNN International only reached the urban population in India. To reach the Indian masses Turner Broadcasting System together with an Indian company, Global Broadcast News (currently TV18 Broadcast Limited), launched the channel in India as CNN-IBN (now known as CNN-News18) on 18 December 2005. The channel was completely run by TV18 Broadcast Limited, which only used the Cable News Network (CNN) brand name.

The company launched WB Channel on 15 March 2009. The channel featured a mix of Hollywood films and (formerly) television dramas from the Warner Bros. Vault.

In 2009 Real TV was launched, Real was a Hindi entertainment channel launched by Turner International India in a 50:50 joint venture with Alva Brothers Entertainment on 2 March 2009 based in Mumbai, Maharashtra. The channel ceased all its operations in March 2010 due to low GRPs and minimum viewership. Also, the channel lacked sponsors and new shows since September 2009 and aired re-runs of its former shows.

On 8 December 2009, it was announced that Turner Asia Pacific Ventures (a wholly owned subsidiary of Turner Broadcasting System) had acquired a 92% stake in NDTV Imagine Ltd. NDTV's 76 percent stake in NDTV Imagine would be given to Turner for $67 million, and the Time Warner company would acquire fresh equity worth $50 million to get 92% control. NDTV Imagine Ltd. ran NDTV Imagine, NDTV Lumiere and NDTV Imagine Showbiz television channels and film production transfer of shares, amounting to 85.68% of NDTV Imagine Ltd, by NDTV Networks Plc to Turner Asia Pacific Ventures. The three channels will be under Turner General Entertainment Networks, a holding company that will infuse fresh capital to fund the network's growth. The 'NDTV' brand was dropped, and the channels were relabeled Imagine TV, Lumiere Movies and Imagine Showbiz. Imagine Showbiz was sold in January 2011 to Reliance Broadcast Network.

In 2015, the company launched Toonami.Before the launch of HBO India, HBO Asia tried replicating the premium model in India. But then HBO decided it wasn't commercially viable, so the channel was launched in India and also in Bangladesh, Pakistan and Maldives.

TiimeWarner in collaboration with Eros International launched HBO Defined and HBO Hits across India on 21 February 2013 on Tata Play, Dish TV and Airtel Digital TV. These channels were advertisement-free. Content on both channels included movies as well as most HBO original programming. When the channels launched, the main HBO channel stopped airing the original series.

In 2015, HBO Asia had decided to exit the Indian market and license the channel to Turner International India previously it was handled by Asian feed. The channel was revamped in February 2016 after a survey conducted by the channel team to better suit the masses. HBO Defined and HBO Hits would be handled by Star India, however HBO Defined and HBO Hits SD was shut down on 31 December 2015 while HBO Hits HD was replaced by HBO HD on 4 September 2016.On 15 May Toonami got shut down and Cartoon Network HD+ was launched on 18 May 2018.

=== WarnerMedia ===
After AT&T acquired Time Warner in the US, the company became known as WarnerMedia worldwide.

On October 15, 2020, WarnerMedia announced that HBO and The WB channel would shut down on December 15, 2020. As a result, the HBO channel ceased to be available in India and Pakistan, while The WB channel was discontinued in India, Bangladesh, Pakistan, and the Maldives.

HBO India closed down at midnight, with the last movie aired on the SD channel being Mad Max: Fury Road (which completed just one hour before the shutdown), and the last movie on the HD channel being Memoirs of a Geisha.

=== Warner Bros. Discovery ===
In July 2022, Discovery Communications and WarnerMedia merged in India. And announced a new team.In 2023 Warner Bros. Discovery and Viacom18 announced a new multi-year agreement, making JioCinema India's new streaming home of HBO, Max Original and Warner Bros. content.

== Units ==
- Discovery+
- Discovery School Super League
- CNN-News18- A 24-hour English news channel in partnership with GBN (a TV18 company)
- ZEDO

=== Warner Bros. Pictures India ===
Year	Film	Notes	Ref.
2008	Saas Bahu Aur Sensex	First Indian movie distributed by Warner Bros. India.	
2009	Chandni Chowk to China	Hindi movie	
2010	Atithi Tum Kab Jaoge	Hindi movie	
2010	Jaane Kahan Se Aayi Hai	Hindi movie	
2010	Phas Gaye Re Obama	Hindi movie	
2010	Utt Pataang	Hindi movie	

=== Former Units ===
- Media Pro Enterprise India Pvt. Ltd., in partnership with Star Den Media Services Pvt. Ltd. Formed in May 2011, the company distributes the largest channel bouquet covering a total of 65 channels.
- Real (a 50/50 joint partnership between Turner and Alva Brothers.)
- Zee Turner Limited, a TV distribution company, in partnership with Zee Entertainment Enterprises.

== Owned channels ==
=== Operating channels ===
Warner Bros. Discovery India currently owns and operates 18 TV channels (12 SD, 6 HD) across English, Hindi, Tamil, Telugu, Malayalam, Kannada, Marathi and Bengali.

Channel	Logo	Launched	Language(s)	Category	SD/HD availability	Notes	Reference
Cartoon Network		1 May 1995	English; Hindi; Tamil; Telugu; Malayalam; Kannada	Kids	SD & HD (as Cartoon Network HD+)	1st kids channel in India and oldest among other sister channels.	
Pogo		1 January 2004	Hindi; Tamil; Telugu; Malayalam; Kannada; Marathi	Kids	SD		
Cartoon Network HD+		18 May 2018	Hindi; English; Tamil; Telugu	Kids	HD & SD (as Cartoon Network)	Different feed from Cartoon Network.	
CNN International		1 January 2000	English	News	SD		
Discovery Channel		15 August 1995; 5 March 2010 (HD feed)	Hindi; English; Tamil; Telugu; Malayalam; Kannada; Bengali; Marathi	Wildlife and Information	SD & HD		
Animal Planet		29, March 1999 (SD Feed) 23, July 2014 (HD feed)	Hindi; English; Tamil Telugu	Wildlife and Information	SD & HD		
TLC		October 2004 (SD) 2 June 2014 (HD)	English and Hindi	Knowledge and Lifestyle	SD & HD	Formerly Discovery Travel & Living	
Discovery Science		January, 2010	English and Hindi	Knowledge and Lifestyle	SD		
Discovery Turbo		January, 2010	English only	Knowledge and Lifestyle	SD		
Discovery Kids		7 August 2012	Hindi; Tamil; Telugu; Malayalam; Kannada; Marathi (Coming Soon)	Kids	SD		
Investigation Discovery		1 June 2014 (SD) 31 January 2018 (HD)	English and Hindi	General Entertainment	SD & HD	Formerly Discovery Jeet (2018-2019) and Jeet Prime (2019-2020).	
Eurosport		6 February 2017 (SD & HD)	English	Sports	SD & HD	Formerly Dsport.	
DTamil		1 April 2003	Tamil	Hollywood entertainment and Information	SD	Formerly Discovery12 and Discovery Tamil.	

=== Defunct channels ===
Channel	Discontinued	Launched	Replaced By	Language	SD/HD availability	Category	Reference
Real	March 2010	2 March 2009		Hindi	SD	General Entertainment	
Imagine Showbiz	September 2011	15 August 2008		Hindi	SD	Music	
Imagine TV	11 May 2012	21 January 2008		Hindi	SD	General Entertainment	
Lumiere Movies	5 July 2012	21 January 2008		English and Hindi	SD	Movies	
HBO Defined	31 December 2015	21 February 2013		English	SD	Movies	
HBO Hits	31 December 2015	21 February 2013		Hindi and English	SD & HD	Movies	
HBO Hits HD	31 December 2015	21 February 2013	HBO HD	Hindi and English	SD & HD	Movies	
Investigation Discovery	12 February 2018	1 June 2014	Discovery Jeet	Hindi and English	SD & HD	General Entertainment	
Toonami	15 May 2018	26 February 2015	Cartoon Network HD+	Hindi and English	SD	Kids	
Jeet Prime	13 January 2020	12 February 2018	Investigation Discovery	Hindi and English	SD & HD	General Entertainment	
WB Channel	15 December 2020	15 March 2009		English	SD	Movies	
HBO	15 December 2020	22 March 2000		English	SD & HD	Movies	
