= Animal Planet (Indian TV channel) =

Indian television channel

- Logo used since 2019
- Country: India
- Broadcast area: Indian subcontinent
- Headquarters: Mumbai, Maharashtra, India

Programming
- Languages: English; Tamil; Hindi; Telugu
- Picture format: 1080i HDTV

Ownership
- Owner: Warner Bros. Discovery India
- Sister channels: See List of channels owned by Warner Bros. Discovery India

History
- Launched: 29 March 1999; 27 years ago 23 July 2014; 12 years ago (HD)

Links
- Website: Animal Planet India

Availability - Available on all major Indian DTH & Cables.

Terrestrial
- DVB-T2 (India): Check local frequencies

Streaming media
- Discovery+ (India): SD & HD
- Jio TV (India): SD & HD
- Amazon Prime Video (India): SD & HD

Animal Planet is an Indian pay television channel owned by Warner Bros. Discovery India for the Indian subcontinent, launched on 29 March 1999 as the Indian version of the original American network. It is available in three languages including English, Tamil , Telugu and Hindi. The channel can be viewed on digital cable and satellite television in India. The channel is also available on its OTT services Discovery Plus.

The channel launched on 29 March 1999. The launch was delayed by a few months. A Hindi language feed was introduced on 1 April 2008. The High Definition version was launched on 23 July 2014 along with TLC HD.

== History ==
Former logo used by the network.

On 3 February 2008, Animal Planet underwent a major revamp in its programming and branding. The new lineup placed a larger focus on series portraying animals as "characters" in their own right, and more "aggressive" and story-based entertainment series targeting mature viewers 13–49 (such as Escape to Chimp Eden and the reality documentary series Whale Wars), as opposed to traditional nature documentaries and family viewing. The network also adopted a new logo, replacing its previous "elephant and globe" emblem with a stylized wordmark, and the new slogan "Same Planet, Different World". Network president Marjorie Kaplan explained that Animal Planet had been too "soft" and family-oriented, and that it was aiming to be "more aggressive and tapping into the instinctual nature of compelling animal content."

In April 2010, Animal Planet introduced a new slogan and marketing campaign, "Surprisingly Human," as an evolution of the 2008 rebranding. The slogan reflected Animal Planet's increasing number of personality-based series following animal-related investigations and occupations, such as River Monsters.

In April 2012, Animal Planet's entertainment-oriented direction was criticised after it broadcast Mermaids: The Body Found—a fictional documentary suggesting that mermaids were real. Despite its fictitious content, the documentary was widely viewed, and a follow-up entitled Mermaids: The New Evidence set an all-time ratings record for the channel.

On 16 July 2019, a Tamil audio track was added.

== Programming ==
Additions to the channel in the late 2000s, such as Meerkat Manor and Orangutan Island, reflected its shift toward "predation programming" and more immersive storytelling. Animal Planet intended the new direction to help revitalize stagnating ratings, after primetime viewership of the network dropped by 9% in 2007. Animal Planet added pseudo-scientific documentary, reality television, and sitcom shows to its line-up.

Animal Planet is also well known for the Puppy Bowl, an annual special featuring puppies at play inside an American football-themed setting. The special airs on the afternoon prior to the NFL's Super Bowl, and was originally narrated by commentator and NFL Films narrator Harry Kalas before his death.

On 29 October 2022, months after the Merger of Discovery, Inc. and WarnerMedia into Warner Bros. Discovery, it was announced that Pit Bulls & Parolees would air its final season, while other shows like Lone Star Law and Louisiana Law moved to Discovery Channel. With the exception of Puppy Bowl XIX that aired on the network 12 February 2023, the latest programming moves left Animal Planet to air reruns of the network's programming as well as other shows from other Discovery properties pre-WBD merger.

== Animal Planet HD ==
Animal Planet HD
- Country: India
- Broadcast area: Indian subcontinent
- Headquarters: Mumbai, Maharashtra, India

Programming
- Languages: English; Tamil; Hindi; Telugu
- Picture format: 1080i HDTV

Ownership
- Owner: Warner Bros. Discovery India
- Sister channels: See List of channels owned by Warner Bros. Discovery in India

History
- Launched: 23 July 2014
- Former names: Animal Planet HD World

Availability

Streaming media
- Discovery+ (India): SD & HD
- Jio TV (India): SD & HD

Animal Planet HD (formerly Animal Planet HD World) is the HD time shift version of Animal Planet India operated by Warner Bros. Discovery for the Indian subcontinent, launched on 23 July 2023. The channel runs time shift to main channel. It is available in eight languages including English, Tamil, Telugu and Hindi The channel can be viewed on digital cable and satellite television in India.

== See also ==
- CNN International
- Discovery Channel
- Discovery Kids
- HBO
