= Ekans – Snakes Awake =

Indian animated series

- Also known as: Ekans - Ek Se Badhkar Snake; Ekans
- Genre: Action; Drama; Mythological; Science fiction; Superhero
- Written by: Yash Thakur
- Directed by: Yogesh Kawale
- Voices of: Vaibhav Thakkar; Prasad Barve; Araanya Kaur; Mukesh Pandey; Ghanshyam Shukla; Rohan jadhav
- Opening theme: "Hikari" by Elaina San
- Ending theme: "Koe" by Ajisai San
- Country of origin: India
- Original languages: English; Hindi; Tamil; Telugu
- No. of seasons: 6
- No. of episodes: 102

Production
- Executive producer: Meera Latkar Nemlekar
- Producer: Ashish J. Thapar
- Running time: 11–12 minutes
- Production companies: Hi-Tech Animation; WarnerMedia India

Original release
- Network: Cartoon Network
- Release: 27 June 2021 – present

Ekans – Snakes Awake (also known as Ekans – Ek Se Badhkar Snake or simply Ekans) is an Indian science fiction superhero computer-animated series produced by Hi-Tech Animation for Cartoon Network (India and Asia). The series centers around 13-year-old Ekans, whose name spelled backward would be "S, N, A, K, E". He has the ability to control snakes in form of robots and can also tackle real ones as well.

It is the first Cartoon Network Indian original computer-animated series.

== Premise ==
The series revolves around a 13-year-old street-smart wunderkind, Ekans, who is chosen as "the one" and is gifted a nagamani by the world's most powerful snakes. With his newfound snake-like powers, the tech-savvy youngster obtains heightened sensory perceptions, ability to camouflage, flexibility, and strength to keep humanity safe from evils. That's not all; his hi-tech superpower suit gives him additional abilities to outsmart villains.

The concept of snake-based powers in the series is derived from an old Indian legend revolving around snakes. In the legend, a community of snakes were granted sentience and powers such as metamorphosis by a magical stone called the Nagamani (lit. Serpent Gem).

== Characters ==
=== Main ===
- Ekans
- Chiku
- Kiara
- Diya
- Dr. Sanjay
- Chocho the Robot
- Naagrakshak
- Agent P
- Bunty
- Dheeraj
- Sonu and Monu

=== Villains ===
- Wire Z
- Shadow Fox
- Sandstorm
- Robotron
- Crazy Vulture
- Time Warp
- Dr. I
- Darkstone
- Elastiko
- Worm King
- Froggie
- Gazero
- Sapera
- Chemical King
- Crazy Collector
- Mongoose & Kanjoose
- Chen & Liu
- Octagon
- Gatoroid
- Danger Driller
- Cemento & Mixer
- Hathoda
- Maharoach
- Lathi & Kathi (Sapera's assistant)
- Grenade & Bicho
- Zahreela
- Ai Virus Black Gurd
- Flower Monster
- Spider Monster
- Bhujang
- Dhoomketu
- Nark Danav

== Broadcast ==
The series debuted on Cartoon Network on 27 June 2021 with first season titled Ekans - Ek Se Badhkar Snake. The second season of the series premiered on 2 August 2021. The third season of the series was premiered on 22 November 2021 under the title Ekans - Snakes Awake!. The series also premiered on Cartoon Network Asia in 25 April 2022. Cartoon Network India shifted the series to its sister channel Pogo on 22 August 2022. The fourth season of the series premiered on 5 September 2022 on Pogo. The fifth season of the series premiered on 25 January 2023 on Pogo. The show shifted to their new sister channel Discovery Kids on 14 October 2023.

== Episodes ==
=== Season 1 (2021) ===
No.	Title	Original air date	Description
1	Dark Dark Darkstone		Ekans springs into action to stop Wire Z when he gets wind of his plans to destroy earth with a rocket.
2	Space Center Pe Attack		Trouble unfolds when Dr. I uses his powers of invisibility to steal secrets.
3	Time Kya Hua Hai		Ekans investigates a strange police radio message broadcast.
4	Break the Snake		Ekans stops wire Z when he gets wind of his plans to destroy Earth.
5	Snake Chor		The evil Mangoose devises a plan to trap Ekans and rid him of his powers.
6	Football Match		Ekans stops Darkstone from disrupting a football match.
7	Snake vs. Mongoose		kans springs into action to stop Mangoose from kidnapping his friends.
8	Invisible Enemy		Chaos unfolds when Dr. I uses his powers of invisibility to steal secrets.
9	Science Science Science		Ekans springs into action to stop the Chemical King from spewing evil.
10	Shadow Fox Return		Trouble unfolds when Shadow Fox rises out of the sea and attacks the city.
11	Picnic Pe Vulture Attack		Trouble unfolds when Crazy Vulture kidnaps Ekans friends.
12	Elastiko Man		Trouble unfolds when an evil experiment goes awry at the Space Center.
13	Crazy Vulture		Chaos ensues when Crazy Vulture attacks the city and Ekans must stop him.

== Specials ==
=== Ekans – Origin Story ===
On 25 December 2021, Cartoon Network aired a special episode of the series titled Ekans Special: Ekans: Origin Story for the celebration of Christmas. In this special episode, it is revealed how Ekans got his super powers and nagamani. It also premiered on Pogo with the title Ekans: Origin Story on 4 September 2022.

== Movies ==
=== Hero Ek Villain Anek ===
A theatrical film titled Ekans – Hero Ek Villain Anek was released in PVR Cinemas on 19 August 2022 in three languages i.e. Hindi, Tamil and Telugu. The film later premiered on Pogo TV in 16 October 2022.

=== The Mystery of Three Gems ===
Pogo TV launched another feature film of the series titled Ekans – The Mystery of Three Gems on 9 October 2022. It is also an original film of Pogo TV of Ekans series.

=== Ekans Takshak Ka Ashirwad ===
Ekans Takshak Ka Ashirwad is the third film in the series. It was originally premiered on Pogo in 26 March 2023. The movie was also launched in Kannada and Malayalam with Hindi,
