= Tik Tak Tail =

- Genre: Comedy; Slapstick
- Country of origin: India
- No. of seasons: 3
- No. of episodes: 182

Production
- Running time: 5 minutes
- Production company: Cosmos Maya

Original release
- Network: Pogo
- Release: 4 September 2017 – 14 August 2019

Tik Tak Tail is an Indian animated slapstick comedy television series produced by Cosmos Maya. It premiered on 4 September 2017 on Pogo. The show is about three characters — Tik, a rabbit; Tak, a tiger and Tail, the tiger's tail.

== Premise ==
Tak and Tail co-operate to hunt down Tik. Tak wants to eat Tik and Tail wants the carrots from Tik. Tik escapes using his wit, sometimes creating a feud between Tak and Tail.

== Characters ==
- Tik: Tik is a sweet, yellow, smart and fast rabbit. Whenever in danger, he can burrow underground and can come up from anywhere on the terrain.
- Tak: Tak is a blue tiger who is constantly trying to capture and eat Tik. He is as fast as Tik but not as smart. He has wolverine-like claws and he can pull out stripes from his body and modify them to make a weapon.
- Tail: Tail is the living tail of Tak. Tail is a vegetarian and really likes carrots, which he tries to steal from Tik.
- Jolly: Jolly is an orange elephant who is Tik's Friend and Tik often calls him Jolly Bhai.
- Tikki: Tikki is a pink rabbit who is Tik's lover.
- Pape: Pape is brown squirrel who's Tik's best friend.
- Chimpu: Chimpu is a monkey/barber

== Broadcast ==
The series was originally premiered on Pogo TV on 4 September 2017. In 2019, the series was also broadcast on Cartoon Network.

== See also ==
- List of Indian animated television series
