= Mercy TV =

Indian Islamic satellite television channel

- Country: India
- Broadcast area: India
- Headquarters: Hyderabad, Telangana, India

Programming
- Languages: Urdu, Hindi, Telugu

Ownership
- Owner: Impact Television Private Limited

History
- Launched: 2020

Links
- Website: mercyTV.tv

Mercy TV is an Indian Islamic satellite television channel operated by Impact Television Private Limited. The channel is based in Hyderabad, Telangana, and broadcasts religious and educational content in Urdu, Hindi, and Telugu. It is approved by the Ministry of Information and Broadcasting (MIB) of India.

== History ==
The channel's license was originally issued in 2011 under the name Katha TV. It was later renamed to MU Odia and then RM – Rujumargam From Darkness to Light. The current name, Mercy TV, was approved by the MIB in 2020.

== Programming ==
Mercy TV broadcasts Islamic religious content, including Qur'anic recitations, lectures, and discussions on Islamic jurisprudence. The channel also airs educational programs for different audiences, including women and children.

== Distribution ==
=== Satellite ===
Mercy TV is broadcast via the Intelsat 17 satellite at 66° East. It is available as a free-to-air channel in MPEG-4 format.

=== Cable and Digital Platforms ===
Mercy TV is currently available on the Jio TV DTH and app. It is also carried by regional cable providers including Den Network, VK Digital, and NXT Digital.

=== OTT Platforms ===
In 2023, Mercy TV launched an over-the-top (OTT) application that provides live and on-demand content.
