= Going to School =

Non-profit organization in India

Going to School Fund, commonly known as Going to School, is a non-profit education trust established in New Delhi, India, in 2003. The organization takes its name from a children's book, Going to School in India, published by Penguin Random House in India in 2004. The book features 25 stories of how children go to school in India. Sections from the original children's book have been incorporated in National Council of Education Research and Training (NCERT) textbooks in India where 10 million children see the stories every year. The children's book was published in the US by Charlesbridge Publishers in 2005.

Going to School's first movies were a series of nine children's documentaries that explore what it is like to go to school in a tent in a desert to girls studying at night with solar lanterns. The movie series aired on POGO and National Geographic Channel in India from 2006 to 2007.

== Founder and Director ==
Lisa Heydluaff is the director and founder of Going to School. Lisa has lived in India for over 15 years and spends her time working to create the ultimate set of stories to teach children skills at school. Lisa is an author (once upon a time a teacher), an Ashoka Fellow, Ted Fellow and Young Global Leader of the World Economic Forum.

== History ==
The organization's most well-known project is Girl Stars. In 2006-7 supported by UNICEF, Girl Stars created new role models for girls, 15 movies, books, radio shows about 15 young women role models who used their education to transform their lives. Popular stories are Anita the Beekeeper and Kiran the Junkyard Dealer.
