= Roll No. 21 =

Indian animated series

- Also known as: Kris: Roll No. 21
- Genre: Action; Adventure; Comedy
- Written by: Avinash Aanand; Kaushik Chawla; Richa Deo; Alok Sharma; Swapnil Narendra
- Directed by: Ah Loong; Uttam Pal Singh
- Voices of: Pooja Punjabi; Vinod Kulkarni; Ganessh Divakar; Vaibhav Thakkar; Koustuv Gosh
- Opening theme: "Roll No. 21"
- Ending theme: "Roll No. 21" (Karaoke)
- Country of origin: India
- Original languages: English; Hindi; Tamil; Telugu; Malayalam; Kannada

Production
- Running time: 20 minutes
- Production companies: Animasia Studio; Cosmos Maya (last season)

Original release
- Network: Cartoon Network (India) Discovery Kids
- Release: 27 November 2010

Roll No. 21 (also known as Kris) is an Indian–Malaysian animated television series produced by Cartoon Network and Animasia Studio. The show is available in English, Hindi, Tamil, Telugu, Malayalam, and Kannada. It was premiered on 27 November 2010 as one of the first Indian originals of Cartoon Network India.

== Plot ==
Kris (orphaned kid granted power by Lord Krishna) is an intelligent and naughty kid who stays at an orphanage school along with his friends - Pinky, Bablu and Madhu. An evil demon king, posing as principal Kanishk (incarnation of Kansa) is out to create havoc in the school. He has ulterior motives to take over the world with his army of zombie demons asuras. To save his friends and school from annihilation, Kris prays to Lord Vishnu and is blessed with superpowers. Armed with a magical peacock feather and a flute, Kris is ready to take on Kanishk. Kanishk with the help of his minions always tries to takedown Kris and often brings demons from Paataal Nagri to do so but always fails.

== Characters ==
=== Main ===
- Kris: Kris is a godly child mostly known as neele gubbare (transl. blue balloon) by Golu. He is an incarnation of Lord Krishna. He has appeared in Mathura Anath Ashram to stop Kanishk and his evil plans, When Kanishk showed up at the school and started wreaking havoc, Kris prayed to Lord Krishna who gave him the powers of himself, he has a flute that he can use to attack or defend himself and a magical Peacock feather. Kris stays as a normal student in the school but secretly changes into Krishna, the divine boy with mystical powers whenever needed. He shows childish traits such as playing, disliking studies and homework, and enjoying playtime with his friends. Like Lord Krishna, Kris also likes butter, ice cream. His skin color is blue in this series.
- Kanishk: Kanishk is the incarnation of Kansa who is the principal of Mathura Anath Ashram. He initially came back on earth to take over the world but Krishna's appearance is 'delaying' his whole plan. He is the king of demons of the Netherworld. In order to get rid of Kris, He keeps coming with a new "Get Kris" plan in each story which forms the storyline for the series. However, since defeating Kris is not easy, and he also has to manage the whole school and its duties, Kanishk keeps summoning various demons from the Netherworld to fight Kris. Kanishk is very concerned about the performance of his school and its result. He is seen constantly nagging with his staff to get the kids' performance up all the time.
- Dr. J: Dr. J is Kanishk's most loyal minion. He is a dentist and stays by Kanishk all the time. He is the reincarnation of Jarasandh. J often keeps coming with new ideas to get rid of Kris. Unfortunately, all his ideas backfire on him and Kanishk. Besides being a dentist, J is also a scientist who keeps inventing various machines, devices, and traps mostly used to tackle Kris. However, he often desires to be the principal of the school and hopes to kick Kanishk out because Kanishk keeps whacking and humiliating him. He gets help from Kris at times.
- Pinky: Pinky is Kris' classmate and a student of Mathura Anath Ashram. She is the incarnation of Radha. She is one of the best friends that Kris has and worries about Kris, her friends, and the school. She is an activist who keeps coming up with different initiatives for the betterment of the school and its students. She also has a crush on Kris. Pinky is also a brainiac who is good with studies.
- Babloo: Babloo is Kris' best friend and the reincarnation of Sudama. He stays with Kris most of the time and backs Kris and his ideas when confronted by Pinky. He is an average student but really good with sports.
- Madhu: Madhu is a friend of Kris and the brains of the group. Among all the friends Kris has, Madhu is the smartest one. He keeps coming up with many innovative ideas of gadgets and devices useful for kids. He is also the smartest student in the school. He often gets bullied by Golu. He is the reincarnation of Madhumangal.
- Golu: Golu is the bully of Mathura Anath Ashram. His only job and recreation are to mess with the kids and to take their stuff or food by force. He is often confronted by Kris and his friends. He is called motu (Fatso) by many people and kids as he has loved any kind of food. He is the overweighted student of the school. Many times, Golu is let in by Kanishk and J in their plans to get back at Kris. Golu happily participates in Kanishk's plans as he likes getting an opportunity to get even with Kris and Kanishk also manages to get Golu's grades a little high. He is the reincarnation of Subala.
- Sukhi: Sukhi is the reincarnation of Narada Muni in the school. He is in the school to report everything to the gods. He owns a phone booth outside the school, where he has a divine phone which connects straight to heaven. He reports about how Kris is doing through this booth. He knows Kris' secret and helps him often by letting him know of Kanishk's evil plans.

=== Recurring ===
- Taarak: Taarak, an incarnation of Tarakasur, is Kanishk's cousin who is there in the school as a maths teacher. He is more of a 'Yes Sir' character who keeps nodding to all of Kanishk's plans to get back at Kris (no matter how ridiculous they are). He sometimes is shown wishing if Kanishk could let him be fit-free as he is constantly nagged by Kanishk to take more extra classes.
- Suparna: Suparna is the chemistry and music teacher of the school. She is the reincarnation of Putana. She is really fond of make-up and is a laid-back but strict teacher.
- Basu: Basu is the sports teacher of the Mathura Anath Ashram. He is loved by the kids and is their favorite teacher. He is the incarnation of Vasudeva and is the only human teacher, unlike the other teachers who are demons.
- Prashant: He is a student in Mathura Anath Ashram. He is somewhat good in studies but very good at sports and dancing. He is the reincarnation of Ujavala.
- Ballu: He is the elder brother of Kris and the incarnation of Balarama. In his first scene in the show, he is seen keeping a public eye on Kris. He is also seen being over-protective of Kris.
- Chimpu and Champu: They are the two sidekicks of Golu. They think Golu is the best.
- Guru Mahasur: He is teacher of all demons of Paataal-Nagri. He is the incarnation of Guru Shukracharya.
- Lord Aquarius: He is the overarching villain and is shown to be the strongest devil. He succeeds in beating Kris and Kanishk in the special episode "The Attack of the Shadow: Part I".
- Agent Veer: He is the protagonist of the show which is a favorite to Kris and his friends. He is a superhero and his enemy is Dr. Dhamaka. He is supported by Kris and his friends.
- Dr. Dhamaka: He is the antagonist of the same show in which Agent Veer is the protagonist. He fights against Agent Veer and is supported by Kanishk and his minions. His two robotic assistants are Babloo and Dabloo.

== Episodes ==
No. in season	Title
1	"Keede Makode/Stop Bugging Me"
It's raining bugs at school. There are bugs all around. In the shower, in Kanishk's Coffee, in Suparna's make up kit etc. And none other that Vrishchika - the scorpion lady from netherworld is responsible for this. She's come seeking revenge from Kris. Meanwhile Dr. J gives the kids an assignment to collect the highest number of bugs. The kids collect the bugs in jars.
2	"Madhu vs Maddy"
Madhu the geek creates his virtual alter ego, called Maddy, on a networking website. Its way of becoming a popular kid in class. Maddy is everything that Madhu had always wanted to be but cannot. Maddy is not a geek, looks suave, he is funny, he is a hero. Maddy has become the talk of the school. Dr. J hatches a plan to use Maddy to defeat Kris.
3	"Friendship Day"
A knock on the head, makes Kanishk lose his memory and he thinks that Kris is his best friend rather than his sworn enemy. He doesn't even remember that he's the school principal anymore. Kanishk begins acting like a kid and sticks to Kris like glue. Though it is fun at first, Kris soon becomes bored…no enemy, no Kanishk equals to zero fun.
4	"Yeh Kya Ho Raha Hai/Double Trouble"
Kris has been behaving strange at school. He paints a moustache on Pinky's doll's face. Kris helps Golu bully Babloo much to the surprise of both of them. Madhu's specs are missing and Kris makes fun of him. Kris trips Sukhi as he is raking the leaves. Everyone hates the way Kris is behaving and can't figure out why? Actually, this is Tarak and Kanishk's evil plan.
5	"Dho Dala/Pet Wash"
Pinky wants to keep a pet Puppy. But Kanishk would not allow that at all, as he hates animals and animals hate him! Kris gets an idea to make his friends' wish come true and also an opportunity to stoke the fire of Kanishk's wrath at the same time. Kris puts up a sign outside the ashram, "Free Pet Wash" and within no time, the ashram is filled with pets from all around Mathura.
6	"Inspection Day"
It's Babloo's birthday and the kids are preparing for a surprise birthday party. Kanishk has got a whiff of the surprise birthday plans and is plotting to make Babloo's birthday also Kris' last day on earth. To ruin the birthday plans and to get rid of Kris, Bun Bun mausi (demon spider) is called from the netherworld.
7	"Caw Caw "Kaka""
Kanishk has summoned Kaka/Bhusasur (The scary scarecrow) again to handle Kris and his friends. While Kanishk, Bhusasur and the 3 minions get ready for Kris, the kids are having fun playing a game of witch and wizards in the dorm. Golu dares Kris to sneak into the Principals office. Dr. J had bribed Golu with chocolates earlier to make him get Kris to the office.
8	"Villans Ki Paathshaala/Finishing School For Villains"
Kanishk's failure to defeat Kris has brought shame to his family in the netherworld. So this time his mom, dad and grandfather pay Kanishk a visit. They feel that Kanishk needs to brush up his evil demon skills and so appoint a teacher for him and the minions. the teacher is a magical stick and it'll train Kanishk and the minions to be the most horrible demons who can crush Kris like a fly.
9	"Jaagte Raho!/The Nap Trap!"
Yogachari arrives again from the netherworld to take revenge against Kris. He works his magic on the kids due to which the kids cannot sleep at night. The next morning when the kids are nodding off in class the 3 minions keep them awake in one pretext or the other. Slowly the sleep deprived kids begin to hallucinate. Yogachari uses the kids' deepest desires and make them turn against the kids.
10	"Dushman Bhagao Helmet/The Bully Proof Helmet"
Fed up of Golu's constant bullying, Madhu makes a bully-proof helmet. The helmet can use the opponents powers against him. So the next time Golu tries to Bully or hit anyone Madhu uses the helmet and Golu ends up hitting his ownself. Dr.J steals Madhu's helmet and shows it to Kanishk.
11	"Pinky Ki Chhaya/What's up with Pinky?"
Kanishk plans to attack Kris with the help of someone he least expects. What better than disguising as one of his best friends- Pinky! Kanishk's minion Chhaya Maya has come back and puts Pinky to sleep in Kanishk's office. Disguising herself as Pinky, Chhaya Maya starts behaving a little weird. She takes Kris to a black valley on the pretext of getting her a blue flower.
12	"Babloo Ka Kavach/Evil Armour"
For the 'Show and Tell' assignment, Babloo gets his hands on an ancient armor. But little does he know that the armor actually belongs to the netherworld and it was Kanishk's plan all along to make Babloo 'find' the armor. Once Babloo wears the evil armor, he feels and becomes all powerful. He even takes on the class bully Golu in a fight. Babloo's armor is a hit at the show and tell.
13	"Mathura High vs Lok Paataal Low"
At Mathura Anath Aashram holidays have been declared. This means no classes, no studies, no books for a whole week! Kanishka however is sad as this also means he can't summon any demons from the netherworld in the disguise of teachers. But Kanishk has another plan ready. The Lokpaatal school is also on a break. This is the first double–length and special episode of the Show.
14	"Besurdas vs Basu Sir"
Kanishk notices the uncanny resemblance between Besurdas, the demon musician and Basu Sir, the school's PT teacher. Kanishk gets an idea to do away with kris. He decides to replace Basu Sir with Besurdas. This way getting Kris would be a piece of cake. Basu Sir is locked up in a cupboard and Besurdas takes his place as the PT teacher.

== Movies ==
This is the list of the 17 feature films of the show. They are also one of the first original Indian movies of Cartoon Network India.

No.	Movie	Premiere Date
1	Roll No 21 - The Quest For Swarnamani	1 March 2012
2	Roll No 21 - Space Mein Dhoom Dhadaka	20 October 2013
3	Roll No 21 - Time Ki Bhool Bhulaiya	14 November 2014
4	Roll No 21 - Ticket To Australia	31 January 2015
5	Roll No 21 - Lights, Camera, Action Kris In Bollywood	14 November 2015
6	Roll No 21 - Kris Aur Scuba Dooba Ajooba	27 December 2015
7	Roll No 21 - Get Set Go Kris	17 August 2016
8	Roll No 21 - Kris Aur Phantom Ka Raaz	24 September 2016
9	Roll No 21 - Kris Aur Shoonya Registaan	14 November 2016
10	Roll No 21 - Kris vs Zombies	26 January 2017
11	Roll No 21 - Kris On Mission Hoola Boola	26 May 2017
12	Roll No 21 - Kris Aur Ulta Pulta Time	12 September 2017
13	Roll No 21 - Kris Aur Ande Ka Funda	14 November 2017
14	Roll No 21 - Kris Aur Barfeela Baffu	6 January 2018
15	Roll No 21 - Kris Chala Jadui Jimbura	2018
16	Roll No 21 - Kris Aur Japani Janjaal	2018
17	Roll No 21 - Kris Aur Aflatoon Africa	29 July 2018

== Games ==
The show has been adapted into video games including by Zapak, an Indian mobile video game developer, which has released games such as Roll No 21 Demon Tapdown, Roll No. 21 - Demon Slash, Run Kris Run, Cartoon Network Ludo.

== Broadcast ==
The series launched on Cartoon Network on 27 November 2010. From 21 February 2021 the rerun of series and its movies aired on Pogo with the title Kris Roll no 21. On 13 November 2022 the series was broadcast on their new sister channel Discovery Kids India.

== Awards ==
Roll No 21 received three awards in the Cartoon Network Super Toons Award 2013 and Indian Telly Award for Best Kids Programme.

== See also ==
- List of Indian animated television series
