= Andy Pirki =

Animated television series

- Characters of the show, Andy (left) and Pirki (right).
- Genre: Slapstick comedy
- Country of origin: India
- No. of seasons: 3
- No. of episodes: 80

Production
- Production company: AUM Animation Studios

Original release
- Network: Pogo
- Release: 3 December 2017

Andy Pirki is an Indian animated slapstick comedy television series produced by AUM Animation Studios (formerly Bluepixels Animation Studios). It premiered on 3 December 2017 on Pogo.

It showcases the story of a pink dinosaur and a caveman, who are best friends.

== Characters ==
=== Andy ===
Andy is a pink dinosaur who is the only remaining member of his species that became extinct when he was very young. He was feeling lonely and cast-out. But then he found Pirki and they became friends.

=== Pirki ===
Pirki is a human who was separated from the human world when he was a child in a sailing mishap. Andy found him and they became friends.

== Accolades ==
Year	Award	Category	Result	Ref.
2015	Digicon6 India Awards	NextGen India	Won	
2015	Best Animated Frames	Best Animated TV Episode [International]	Won	
2015	Best Animated Frames	Best Animated TV Episode [Indian]	Won	
2016	Best Animated Frames	Best Animated TV Episode [Indian]	Won	
2017	Best Animated Frames	Best Animated TV Episode [Indian]	Won	
2017	Best Animated Frames	Best Animated TV Episode [International]	Won	
