= CNN International South Asia =

CNN International
- Country: India
- Broadcast area: South Asia
- Network: CNN International
- Headquarters: New Delhi, India

Programming
- Language: English
- Picture format: 1080p HDTV

Ownership
- Parent: CNN
- Sister channels: Animal Planet; Cartoon Network; Cartoon Network HD+ CNN News18; Discovery Channel; Discovery HD World; Discovery Kids; Discovery Science; Discovery Tamil; Discovery Turbo; Eurosport; Investigation Discovery; Pogo; TLC

History
- Launched: June 1995

CNN International South Asia is a Pan-South Asian English-language news channel based in New Delhi, India. The channel is owned by CNN. It was launched on pay television, in 1995. The channel is targeted toward India, Pakistan, Bangladesh, Sri Lanka, Nepal, Bhutan, and Maldives.

== Programmes ==
- Africa Inc.
- African Voices
- Amanpour
- Anderson Cooper 360°
- CNN Creators
- CNN Freedom Project
- CNN Headline Express
- CNN Newsroom
- Connect the World with Becky Anderson
- Erin Burnett Outfront
- Fareed Zakaria GPS
- Inside Africa
- Isa Soares Tonight
- Marketplace Africa
- Marketplace Asia
- Marketplace Europe
- Marketplace Middle East
- One World with Zain Asher
- Quest Means Business
- Smerconish
- State of the Union
- The Amanpour Hour
- The Brief with Jim Sciutto
- WorldSport

== Joint venture with News18 ==
CNN International only reached the urban population in India. To reach the Indian masses, Turner Broadcasting System together with an Indian company, Global Broadcast News (currently TV18 Broadcast Limited), launched the channel in India as CNN-IBN on 18 December 2005. The channel was completely run by TV18 Broadcast Limited, which only used the Cable News Network (CNN) brand name.

== Concerns ==
In 2017, a retired Lieutenant General and now a frequent TV news analyst and commentatator, Talat Masood told CNN International about Pakistan's nuclear capabilities and nuclear deterrent against any attacks on the country.

In October 2018, the Supreme Court of Pakistan directed the Pakistan Electronic Media Regulatory Authority (PEMRA) to issue directives to all foreign channels broadcasting in Pakistan to make them aware that, under the existing Pakistani law, they are not permitted to have more than 10 per cent foreign content. This law's purpose was to have the foreign channels focus on local news events also, rather than rehash and rerun broadcasts of American and European TV programs.

== See also ==
- HBO (India)
- WB Channel
