= Discovery Turbo (India) =

- Type: Informative channel
- Country: India
- Broadcast area: India; Bangladesh; Sri Lanka
- Headquarters: Mumbai, Maharashtra, India

Programming
- Language: English
- Picture format: 1080i (HDTV)

Ownership
- Owner: Warner Bros. Discovery India
- Sister channels: See List of channels owned by Warner Bros. Discovery in India

History
- Launched: 2010; 16 years ago

Availability - Available on all major Indian DTH & Cables.

Terrestrial
- DVB-T2 (India): Check local frequencies

Streaming media
- Discovery+ (India): SD & HD
- Jio TV (India): SD & HD
- Amazon Prime Video (India): SD & HD

Discovery Turbo is an Indian male-oriented factual television channel devoted to programming regarding cars, bikes, boats, and planes. The channel is owned by Warner Bros. Discovery. The channel was launched in January 2010 and was later converted into a men's only channel on 1 December 2014.

== History ==
The channel was launched on 25 January 2010 along with Discovery Science.

== Programming ==
This is a list of programs broadcast by Discovery Turbo

- A Bike is Born
- The AA Torque Show
- Air Dogs
- Airplane Repo
- American Icon: The Hot Rod
- American Chopper
- American Hot Rod
- American Trucker
- Auto Trader
- Bangla Bangers
- Beetle Crisis
- Biker Build-Off
- British Biker Build-Off
- Campervan Crisis
- Car Crazy Central
- Car Science
- Carfellas
- Chasing Classic Cars
- Chop Shop: London Garage
- Classic Car Club
- Dallas Cars Sharks
- Desert Car Kings
- Drift Style
- Engineering The World Rally
- Extreme Car Hoarders
- Extreme Machines
- FantomWorks
- Fast N' Loud
- Fat N' Furious: Rolling Thunder
- Fifth Gear
- FlightPathTV
- Flying Heavy Metal
- The Great Biker Build-Off
- Hard Shine
- Heartland Thunder
- High Tech Rednecks
- Hot Rod TV
- I Could Do That
- In a Fix
- Inside West Coast Customs
- Kings of Crash
- Kit: An Autobody Experience
- Kustomizer
- Last Car Standing
- Martin Shaw: Aviators
- Mean Green Machines
- Million Dollar Auctions
- Motor City Motors
- Motor Morphers
- Monster Garage
- Off Limits
- Off The Road
- Overhaulin'
- Patrick Dempsey: Racing to Le Mans
- Pit Crews
- Playing Parking Only
- Racer Girls
- Railroad Alaska
- Redline TV
- Restoration Garage
- Retro Car Kings
- Rides
- The Road to Le Mans
- The Secret Club of Speed
- The Secret Life of Formula One
- Street Customs
- Top Marques
- Thunder Races
- Trick My Truck
- Trick My What?
- Twist the Throttle
- Ultimate Biker Challenge
- Ultimate Car Build-Off
- Unique Whips: Special Edition
- What's in the Barn?
- Wheeler Dealers
- Wrecked
- Wreck Rescue
- Wrecks to Riches

== See also ==
- CNN International
- Discovery Real Time
- Discovery Science
