= Multi TV =

- Country: Ghana
- Broadcast area: Africa
- Headquarters: Accra

Programming
- Language: English
- Picture format: 576i (SDTV) 16:9

Ownership
- Owner: Multimedia Group Limited

History
- Launched: February 21, 2009 (17 years ago)
- Replaced: JCTV (Ghana)
- Closed: June 10, 2024 (2 years ago)
- Replaced by: Multi TV (India)

Links
- Website: www.multitvworld.com

Multi TV is a privately owned satellite television service based in Ghana was launched on 21 February 2009. The service offers a variety of news, sports and entertainment channel in digital format. It was set up in 2009 by the Multimedia Group Limited. Ghana This channel will be changed to India on 10 June 2024 when rebranded as India.

== India ==
Multi TV
- Country: India
- Broadcast area: Africa
- Headquarters: Accra

Programming
- Language: English
- Picture format: 576i (SDTV) 16:9
- Timeshift service: 1st Birthday (2025); 2nd Birthday - Last year (2026)

Ownership
- Owner: Reliance Digital (2025-2026)

History
- Launched: 10 June 2024; 2 years ago
- Replaced: Multi TV (Ghana)
- Closed: 25 August 2026; 57 days ago
- Former names: Reliance Multi (10 June 2024 - 26 October 2024)

Links
- Website: www.multitvworld.com

Availability

Terrestrial
- Airtel digital TV: Channel 334
- Tata Play: Channel 507

Multi TV is a privately owned satellite television service based in India. The service offers a variety of news, sports and entertainment channel in digital format. It was set up in 2009 by the Multimedia Group Limited., This channel launched on 10 June 2024 in as Reliance Multi TV, This channel launched only in 4K. Launched only in Airtel and Tata Play only. Not available in JioTV.

=== India history ===
On 26 October 2024, Reliance Multi will be renamed as Multi TV. It was became first.

Multi TV - No.1 Program (10 June 2024 - 25 August 2026)
Year	Program
2024-2025	Night Breaking
2024-2025	738, 819, 382, 641, 785, 983, 999, Non-Stop Fast & Multi
2025-2026	Fast and Multi India
2024-2026	Good Morning Multi
2024-2026	1000% Multi
2024-2025	Multi and Top 100
2025	India Non-Stop Holiday 2025
2025-2026	Afternoon Multi
2024-2025	Holiday 500-500
2026	Shopping Special
2025-2026	Multi @ 4
2024	Happy 0.5th Birthday
2026	Multi TV's 2nd Birthday
2025	Multi TV's 1st Birthday

Multi TV is gets MIB licence on April 30, 2024.

On 10 June 2025, Multi TV gets 1st birthday party at the Multi TV.

On 10 June 2026, Multi TV gets 2nd birthday party at the Multi TV.

Happy Birthday
Date	Name
10 June 2025	1st Birthday
10 June 2026	2nd Birthday

Multi tv closed on 25th August 2026, This channel will be moved from Multi TV since August 2026.

== Scheduled replaced ==
Multi TV will be birthdays 10 June (2025 and 2026) for first and second birthday party. sing the Happy Birthday song, Used closed on 25 August 2026, you can also known as Tata Crucible Campus Quiz at the same TV channel.
