= Jungle Tales (TV series) =

- Country of origin: India

Production
- Production company: Moving Pictures Company India

Original release
- Network: Cartoon Network
- Release: 6 November 2004

Jungle Tales is an Indian animated television series produced by Moving Pictures Company India. It is an adaptation of stories from the Panchatantra and it was the first indigenous 3D animation programming on the small screen. It premiered on 6 November 2004 on Cartoon Network.

== See also ==
- The Jungle Book
