= TLC (Indian TV channel) =

- Logo used since 2010
- Country: India
- Broadcast area: Indian subcontinent
- Headquarters: Mumbai, Maharashtra, India

Programming
- Languages: English; Hindi
- Picture format: 1080i HDTV

Ownership
- Owner: Warner Bros. Discovery India
- Sister channels: See List of channels owned by Warner Bros. Discovery in India

History
- Launched: October 2004; 21 years ago
- Former names: Discovery Travel & Living (2004-2010)

Availability - Available on all major Indian DTH & Cables.

Terrestrial
- DVB-T2 (India): Check local frequencies

Streaming media
- Discovery+ (India): SD & HD
- Jio TV (India): SD & HD
- Amazon Prime Video (India): SD & HD

TLC is an Indian pay television channel owned by Warner Bros. Discovery for the Indian subcontinent. Launched in October 2004. Previously known as Discovery Travel & Living. It focuses on lifestyle programmes, with topics such health, cooking and travel. The channel can be viewed on digital cable and satellite television in India.

== History ==
The channel launched in October 2004 and was the first international channel launched under the "Discovery Travel & Living" name.

On 1 September 2010 Discovery Travel & Living India became TLC. TLC's HD feed was launched on 2 June 2014.

The channel features both original productions and imported programmes. The first local original production for the channel was The Great Indian Wedding. The series was produced by Blue Mango Films, a leading non-fiction film company in India. Following its success, the channel has started offering more Indian programming.

== Programming ==
Programmes shown in the channel include:

- Star vs Food
- Unique Sweets
- Gypsy Sisters
- Ultimate Cake Off
- Man v. Food
- Ravinder's Kitchen
- Fun Taiwan All-Stars
- Gordon's Great Escape
- Great Indian Global kitchen
- Food Fighters (TV series)
- Fast Food Mania
- Hell's Kitchen (American TV series)
- Planet Food
- Bizarre Foods with Andrew Zimmern
- Jamie at Home
- Nigel Slater's Dish of the Day
- World Cafe: Asia
- Luke Nguyen's Vietnam
- Off Road with Gul Panag
- Chuck's Week Off
- Bridget's Sexiest Beaches
- Outrageeous Kid Parties
- 90 Day Fiance
- Extreme Couponing
- Amazing Eats
- The Taste (British TV series)
- Kylie Kwong: My China
- Get Out!
- Wild Weddings
- Jamie's 30 minute meals
- Queens of Comedy

Logo Used As Discovery Travel And Living from 2004-2010

== TLC HD World ==
TLC HD (formerly known as TLC HD World) is an Indian pay television channel owned by Warner Bros. Discovery. The channel is a HD version of TLC. The channel broadcast same shows from main feed.

TLC HD World
- Country: India
- Broadcast area: Indian subcontinent
- Headquarters: Mumbai, Maharashtra, India

Programming
- Languages: English; Hindi
- Picture format: 1080i HDTV (downscaled to 576i for the SD feed)

Ownership
- Owner: Warner Bros. Discovery India
- Sister channels: See List of channels owned by Warner Bros. Discovery in India

History
- Launched: 2 June 2014

Availability - Available on all major Indian DTH & Cables.

Terrestrial
- DVB-T2 (India): Check local frequencies

Streaming media
- Discovery+ (India): SD & HD
- Jio TV (India): SD & HD
- Amazon Prime Video (India): SD & HD

== See also ==
- Cartoon Network
- CNN
- Discovery Channel
- Pogo
