= Wrecks to Riches =

Wrecks to Riches is an American reality television series that aired on Discovery Channel from March 28, 2006, to June 14, 2007, over two seasons. The show focuses on Barry White and his staff buying old cars for little money and turning them into Super Muscle cars. There was usually a deadline of between three and four weeks to complete the cars after which they were auctioned off at various locations around the United States. One of the completed cars has been auctioned on eBay.

== Episode list - Season 1 ==
No.	Title
1	"Frankenstein's Monster"
Barry White is looking to resurrect something special for the big Silver Auto Auction in Reno, Nevada. On the Internet, his daughter Jen tracks down '71 Plymouth Road Runner, which gets his blood pumping. The Chrysler model attracted MOPAR fans during the muscle car era and Barry’s hoping to do the same at auction, more than 30 years later. Trouble is, on inspection, the Road Runner’s riddled with rust. but Barry's already bought it over the net. He has to think quickly. He buys second Plymouth to get out of bind. Like Dr. Frankenstein, he plans to create one Super Muscle Car from the two donor wrecks. Then his designer, Chris Brown, suggests they crank the Frankenstein thing up another notch and make a GTX, the top-of-the-line Plymouth muscle car. But to pull it off, they need MOPAR Hemi engine. And that’s when things go down hill fast. The big MOPAR dream runs out of time and costs Barry way more than he wanted to spend. And the more they get into their Frankenstein creation, the more they find it was probably a big mistake. MOPAR fans are hard-markers and fiercely protective of their brand. Can Barry and the team create a GTX to loosen the cash from the pockets? Or will they be left with monster no one wants?
2	"Christine Camaro"
Barry White knows good wreck when he sees 1. at least he thought he did. The old '69 Camaro shell he bought from wrecking yard turns out to be cursed. Paint-stripper and angle-grinders reveal hidden rust and dodgy body work, delaying the build and forcing him to shell out more money than he planned on new sheet-metal. That's just the start of it. As the build goes on, strange things start happening. The super-charger doesn't fit the engine. Wrong parts are delivered. The engine bay catches fire. Wind sends newly painted parts crashing to the ground and back to the paint shop. The Team dub the Camaro "Christine" after the killer car in Stephen King's novel. but Barry gets help from an unusual source. The Corona Police Department have some muscle car fans who offer to get the build back on schedule. The well-drilled machine work like a dream and finally Christine is ready for auction at picturesque Jackson Hole. But Barry's had to spend way more than he planned. The Camaro owes him $40,000. Barry's nervous. Even more so when the auction gets underway and rival fully restored Camaro goes under the hammer for just $25,000. Will Christine's curse mean Barry loses his shirt?
3	"Dad Stole My Car"
Barry White has a problem. He may be a Hot Rod superstar, building some of America's coolest and expensive custom vehicles, but right now he can't even find a wreck to work on. The Kruse Auto Auction in Las Vegas is just four weeks away. Barry needs to be there with Stunning creation to catch cashed-up buyer with the big bucks. Barry wants to build 'super muscle' car, vehicle that looks like the 1960s but drives like 2005. He needs an old wreck, not too far gone, which he and his team can transform into showroom masterpiece. After trawling the junkyards he's found nothing appropriate and has run out of time. There is one wreck he could use. But it belongs to his daughter Jen. Could he just take it? You bet. Jen's reaction is no surprise. The teenager storms off on hearing the news and the Speed Shop emergency turns into a family feud. Will Jen come around and help work on her car, only to hand it over to some rich buyer in Vegas? Will she ever talk to her father again? Can Barry's Team, collection of characters and experts, turn a clapped-out Chevy Chevelle into show-stopping muscle car in just four weeks? How much will it cost Barry? Could he ever get his money back? It will take more than good luck to pull it off. And even if they get the car built on time, when they turn up at the auction, their fate lies in the hands of fickle buyers. Barry's money, his reputation, and his family relations are on the line.
4	"The Apprentices"
Class is in at Barry White’s Speed Shop. 5 Students from the local Hot Rod University volunteer to help Barry’s Team turn clapped-out ’70 Pontiac Le Mans into brand-new GTO for the Silver Auto Auction in Portland, Oregon. wIth just 4 weeks to complete the transformation, it seems like Good idea—until Barry finds the pitfalls of Playing Teacher and producing a Super Muscle Car at the same Yime. There are speed bumps at every turn. It seems no one did the homework on GTO parts—the crucial front-end is missing in action. and the Promise of Job to the best student turns the classroom into bullpen. The Students split into a and b Teams, creating distraction just when Barry needs results. If that isn’t enough, word is there is no money at the Portland auction. Barry’s favorite buyers aren’t coming. GTO 101 is shaping up for disaster.
5	"Mean Green"
Barry White's speed shop is in meltdown. They've committed to turning 10 wrecks into auction showpieces in as many months. And the strain is showing. Midway through, morale is at an all time low, but Barry has a plan to inject life back into his team. He sets out to build mean, Green, super-muscle dragster. car his Team can't help but get excited about. former drag racer himself, it is familiar turf for Barry and his wife Becky, who was towed to countless drag strips in their courting days. This should bring back some memories and motivate the crew, all of them drag fans. but Barry knows putting a drag car under the hammer is big gamble. There will be limited buyers and although it will be Street legal, it won't be the car to take shopping. It is based on 1960s Chevy Nova. They call it 'Gangreen'. Barry encourages his young paint and body guy, Todd, also drag racer, to Steer the Project. Then Barry challenges another of his young charges, Branden, to Get an old shop dragster ready for Showdown at the end of the build. How can you make race-certified, Street-legal, fire-breather monster in four weeks? and will there be Cashed-up drag fan at the Silver Auto Auction in Portland Oregon? The team is about to find out.
6	"Pony Race"
What's better than building a hot Mustang Muscle Car? Building TWO of them. Barry White has his hands full. The Shop is transforming 2 Pony cars for 2 very different events; new '05 car for the SEMA awards and Super Muscle '69 fastback for auction. On double duty, everyone needs to pitch in. Barry's wife and daughter get down and dirty and even designer and parts guy, Chris Brown, unplugs the Phone to roll in grease. The 1St priority is to transform brand-new '05 Mustang V8 into boss-inspired monster dreamed up by Barry and Chris. They're going for 'Best in Show' at SEMA, the auto industry's biggest showcase in Las Vegas. One hundred thousand visitors from 100 countries will be there. Reputations will be made and lost. Meantime, the old '69 resurrection risks taking back seat, so Barry invites his friends at the Beverly Hills Fire Department to pitch in after hours. To lure these muscle car fans, Barry Paints the car fire-engine red. The stage is set for Mustang duel, and double trouble for Barry White.
7	"The Fireman's Ball"
Barry White's Speed Shop has been taken over by the Beverly Hills Fire Department. Or at least, fire-fighting muscle car enthusiasts who've moved in to help him rebuild his latest wreck — and this one is something special. The 1969 Mustang Fastback was a classic of its era. With smooth lines, and powerful engine, it defined muscle car, and turned heads at every traffic light. but that was more than thirty years ago, and the wreck Barry has found wouldn't even turn heads in the junkyard. after 6 previous cars, Barry is used to the challenge. He has only month to turn this dilapidated Mustang, into the Pony car that Steals the show at the prestigious Kruse Auto Auction in Las Vegas. This time it should be easier. He has the fire fighters Providing much needed labor. Even better, so many want in on the act, they split into two shifts, prepared to keep working virtually around the clock. And that's where Barry's problems start. Who knew fire fighters could be so competitive? The rivalry between Shift and B Shift is fierce, with each trying to outdo the other, and Barry's Stuck in the middle playing peacemaker. They're working so fast, parts guy Chris Brown can't keep up. Before long, there's workshop full of agitated fire fighters, with nothing to do. It's recipe for disaster and Barry has never had to handle anything like this before. Will the fire fighters walk out? Will Chris find the parts they need? Will the Super Muscle Car version of the Mustang Fastback get finished? For Barry, making riches out of this wreck seems an impossible dream.
8	"The Legend"
Barry White's reputation as an award winning hot rod builder is on the line. He has a crazy idea to recreate '60s Stock Car — in race-trim, but street legal. and not just any Stock Car; he's asked legendary race car driver Parnelli Jones for permission to reproduce his 1964 Mercury Marauder and he doesn't want to let him down. Normally Barry needs four weeks to transform old wrecks into auction drawcards, but this time he only has three. He's thinking a rough and ready stock car should be any easy build. Until he finds out nobody makes the parts anymore. Adding to his worries, he doesn't have his normal team of workers and has to call in some family favors. The speed shop is Stressed to the max, so it's all hands on deck. But will everyone pull their weight? He has two deadlines, the McCormick auction in Palm Springs, and an assessment of his work from Parnelli Jones himself. Will he make the Grade and make some money?
9	"Plain Jane"
Barry White is learning the hard way that some wrecks are better than others. Despite 25 years in the Hot Rod business, he can Still find that he's bought himself lemon once his team strips it down. It's craps shoot, costing time and money just to get the body in shape before he can work his Super Muscle Car magic. Well, this time he's taking shortcut. He's found '71 Ford Torino in almost showroom condition. It's Perfect blank canvas to transform into hot street machine. Sure, it's more money upfront—$12k compared with his usual 3 to 6—but this thing looks like it has only been driven to Wal-Mart on Sundays. Tony Correia, the body guy, thinks Christmas has come early. for the first time he only has to tweak the panels to exaggerate the factory lines. Designer and parts guy Chris Brown thinks he's on easy Street. Just few Parts to find, nothing too exotic, and reasonable schedule compared to the normal race. and to cap it all off, a team of cyclists wants in on the build, taking even more heat off the team. What could go wrong with this cruise? Try aWOL engine, mismatched Paint, car accident and the wrong brakes. and the auction Price? You won't believe It.
10	"Poison Dart"
Barry White and the Speed Shop Team are exhausted. The challenge of transforming a rusted wreck into gleaming, powerful, super muscle car is enormous in itself. But every month, for the last 9 months, they've done exactly that. Now, there is just one car left to build. for the grand finale, Barry is looking to create something truly unique and buried away at the back of a scrap yard, he finds it. The Dodge Dart. Stock standard, this was not vehicle to get an enthusiast's heart racing. It was a compact, with good but not outstanding performance. That was until someone got the idea of dropping in massively powerful Hemi engine, and creating the fastest accelerating car on the road. Barry plans to recapture the spirit of that '69 legend, by building his own Hemi Dart. After completing nine previous cars on time, he's confident he can do it. Maybe too confident. Before he's even bought the wreck, Barry's committed to sell the Dart at the Russo and Steele auction, in Scottsdale Arizona, at any price. He has to get the car there, and unless it's perfect, he'll losefortune. Designer Chris Brown has a plan to bump up the price, by injecting little Rock and Roll into the Dart. He's got a contact with the 1980s band Poison. It's a perfect fit. The "Poison Dart". But can he convince drummer Ricky Rocket to come down the Speed Shop and give the car his blessing? 4 weeks. an implausibly powerful car. rock star to wrangle. Selling at any price. Can Barry White pull off perhaps the biggest challenge he's faced in the series? If the Dart misses the target, it will end up costing Barry fortune.

== Episode list - Season 2 ==
No.	Title
1	"Chevy El Camino"
Barry's looking for a new challenge and as far as he's concerned, there's only one choice - an El Camino. His newest fabricator, Bobby, has an emotional attachment to the El Camino; his dad gave him a '69 when he was a teenager. Although not Bobby's car, Barry's '70 El Camino wreck tugs at Bobby's heart. He's helping rebuild this one for his dad, who'll be 'looking over his shoulder' as fiercely as his boss. Barry's money and Bobby's family ties are at stake - and they only have four weeks to get the car ready for auction.
2	"Mercury Cougar"
Barry, Chris and Tony are looking for a racing legend. Two actually. The boys start searching for a '68 Mercury Cougar. Barry wants to transform it into a Super Muscle Car classic racer, the XR-7G. The G stands for Gurney, as in Dan Gurney. He is the second legend on their hit-list, an old-school racer who flew the U.S. flag around the world in Formula One, Indy, and the famous Le Mans behind the wheel of the Ford GT. To get Dan's blessing would be a dream come true. And having him sign the car would be the ultimate endorsement. But if that's gonna happen, there's a lot of work to do with no time for screw-ups. Everything will have to be perfect to entice the legend to join the project. Barry's daughter Jen has a thing for legends that belies her tender age. She loves the old-school monsters above modern race cars; the raw engineering and power of the early classics are what spins her wheels. Will she get the chance to meet the great man? Jen will move heaven and earth to make it happen. Jen is also moving herself. She's finally leaving home and living in her own apartment. It's a big turning point in the White's lives: Mom, Becky, has to say goodbye to her only child, while Barry gets her bedroom back for car stuff. But it's not as if they won't see each other every day at the shop.
3	"Ford Fairlane Thunderbolt"
When it comes to cars, Barry's mind is never far away from the drag strip. He's now set his staff to finding a '64 Fairlane to become nothing less than a Thunderbolt. What plans: a 427 V-8 engine, fibreglass hood, over-sized rears and racing seats, and it will be street-legal. Everyone's excited, including his regular parts suppliers. Two guys from O'Reilly's turn up to pitch in for the build. It's a laugh a minute as they verbally wrestle Barry about who knows best. And there's more; rather than risk an open auction as usual, Barry's going to start his own... at the Speed Shop! Barry, Becky and Chris hope to round up some high-rollers to duke it out in the bidding. Barry's DIY auction is a first. But if he can convert his building skills into entrepreneurship he stands a chance. And there's no commission! Becky and Jen become event managers, a first for both. Will they have to block off the street? Who's doing the catering? What about parking? Permits? Auctioneer? The event snowballs into a logistics nightmare. And there's another wildcard; paint and body guy Tony starts thinking he might just bid for the Thunderbolt himself! Barry has no idea. This could be their most eventful auction yet.
4	"Plymouth Satelite Roadrunner"
The Road Runner made the Coyote look stupid in cartoon land. How will Barry and the team go with their SMC version? This no-frills speedster was a favorite with moonshiners; it could outrun any police car. Barry doesn't plan to break the law, but he sure wants to break the rules. Helping him are some more guys from O'Reilly (Tim Porter and Scott Jensen) and MOPAR guru Ronnie Jenkins. It's the A-team turning this ugly duckling into a swaggering swan. And Barry has another auction brainstorm: "Sell it on the internet!" Barry's entrepreneurial spirit is ignited by his DIY auction, now he's putting his next creation online, hoping to flush out buyers from absolutely everywhere. Bidders can watch the build progress on Barry's website as they contemplate how much they think it's worth. What's more the last two days of auction will be watched at SEMA, by Barry, his team and thousands of SEMA visitors who have a chance to bid themselves through computers at the TURBO stand. A big screen projector and loud auctioneer calling the online action will be a SEMA showstopper. Then it's out to the SEMA skid pan to smoke up the Road Runner before adoring fans.
5	"1957 Chevrolet"
The Muscle Car Era has made Barry White a happy man, along with his high-dollar customers who buy his creations at auction. But this hot rodder and drag racer is always looking for a challenge and Barry finds it one morning during his pre-breakfast stroll. Outside his neighbor's house sits an American classic; a '57 Chevy, with a 4-sale sign that Barry can't walk past. The only question in Barry's mind is whether to turn it into restoration project or a quarter-mile burning dragster? The answer comes only too quickly, as the body turns out to be junk… too much time, too much money for restoration. Barry decides to head for the track and give it the Mother Of All nose jobs and a monster motor to try to hook a drag-racing fan. He decides to hold the auction at the Wally Parks National Hot Rod Association Museum. And if that's not risky enough, Barry wants to try a new way of selling; a silent auction, with sealed bids. It works for Real Estate auctions, but can it work for Barry? Turns out there's nothing 'silent' about this auction!
6	"Chevelle "The Green Car""
Barry White and his team have always been into recycling big time. They rebuild left-for-dead junkers into stunning showroom Super Muscle. But this time they're going for broke; full-on, tree-hugging torque with an enviro-friendly '71 Chevrolet Chevelle. Just how do you build a 'green' hot rod? You need more than a change of color. The plan for this eco-overhaul calls for improved mileage, reduced emissions and non-toxic paint, just for starters. And to help Barry 'correct' this former gas-guzzling Chevelle, he gets extra muscle from a possie of Prison Guards who know all about Correctional Facilities. In four weeks they'll need to bring the last of the original oil-thirsty Muscle Cars into the climate-aware 21st Century, in time for Barry's second 'home' auction. But who wants to buy a 'Hippy Hot Rod'? Paint and Body guy Tony can't think of anyone. But Barry, Jen and Chris think it's the way of the future. Can Barry's Speed Shop turn into a Green House?
