= Investigation Discovery (India) =

Television channel

- Logo used since 2020
- Country: India
- Broadcast area: Indian subcontinent
- Headquarters: Mumbai, Maharashtra, India

Programming
- Languages: English; Hindi
- Picture format: 1080i HDTV

Ownership
- Owner: Warner Bros. Discovery India
- Sister channels: See List of channels owned by Warner Bros. Discovery in India

History
- Launched: 2014; 12 years ago (ID); 12 February 2018; 8 years ago (Discovery Jeet); 13 January 2020; 6 years ago (second incarnation of ID)
- Replaced: Jeet Prime
- Closed: February 12, 2018 (original)
- Former names: Discovery Jeet (2018-19); Jeet Prime (2019-20)

Availability - Available on all major Indian DTH & Cables.

Terrestrial
- DVB-T2 (India): Check local frequencies

Streaming media
- Discovery+ (India): SD & HD
- Jio TV (India): SD & HD
- Amazon Prime Video (India): SD & HD

Investigation Discovery (abbreviated as ID) is an Indian multinational pay television network dedicated to true-crime documentaries owned by Warner Bros. Discovery broadcasting in English and Hindi. The channel was launched on 1 June 2014 then again relaunched in January 2020. The channel airs programming from its American counterpart and Scripps.

The channel was rebranded as Discovery Jeet in 2018, and later was rebranded as Jeet Prime. Due to poor ratings, the channel switched back as Investigation Discovery in 2020.

== History ==
Former logo as Discovery Jeet

Former logo as Jeet Prime

Investigation Discovery was launched in 2014 by Discovery Communications India as a Hindi-language entertainment channel. Later, on 1 February 2018, the channel rebranded as Discovery Jeet with English, Tamil, Telugu audio feeds.

The company also shifted their headquarters from Delhi to Mumbai which is more suited for building a national general entertainment channel. It aims to create 1000 hours of original content a year. The shows will also be available digitally via Netflix. The channel had a reach of 140 million on the day of launch.

Discovery announced plans to revamp the channel with dubbed content from Scripps after low ratings.

However, things did not work out as planned and on 13 January 2020, the channel was rebranded again to Investigation Discovery.

== See also ==
- CNN International
- Discovery Channel
- Pogo
