= Martin Shaw: Aviators =

British television series

Martin Shaw: Aviators is a six-part British television series produced by Twofour. It was first broadcast on Discovery Real Time in 2006.

Each episode of the series had a number of segments. Together, the segments gave us three key stories, which ran, more or less, in parallel.

Firstly, there is the story of the crash of actor Martin Shaw's, treasured Stearman biplane, G-BAVO, known as "Two-Six" and his project to get it flying again. The aeroplane, a Kaydet Stearman, was crashed on 1 August 2004 by another pilot after the aeroplane failed to climb. No one was injured. The air accident investigation branch released a report of the crash in PDF format on its website, but did not come to any definite conclusion as to the cause of the crash. Shaw states a new engine had been recently installed. He asked Blackbarn aviation to restore the plane. It is not an economically viable proposition, but he commented that it seemed to be the emotional and common sense thing to do.

Secondly, there is an outline of the history of flight from the earliest days of ballooning, through developments driven by war, to dreams of everyday travel into space.

Lastly, he gives us an insight into the world of the aviation fanatic. He took the opportunity to fly some of his all-time favourite aircraft. He took the controls of a Spitfire owned by Maurice Bayliss. At Cranfield Airport, he co-piloted an English Electric Lightning owned by Russell Carpenter. Although forbidden to take off, the jet did reach 150 mph in three seconds along the tarmac. He also compared notes with Wing Commander Ken Wallis, the nonagenarian builder and developer of the modern autogyro.

At the very end of the series, Shaw delights in the return of his Stearman to the skies above Norfolk. Following that first test flight, G-BAVO was grounded for several more months by aviation bureaucracy before finally receiving its new air safety certificate.
