= Real (TV channel) =

- Real
- Country: India
- Broadcast area: India
- Headquarters: Mumbai, Maharashtra, India

Ownership
- Owner: Turner International India (now known as Warner Bros. Discovery)

History
- Launched: 2 March 2009; 16 years ago
- Closed: March 2010; 15 years ago

Real was a Hindi entertainment channel launched by Turner International India in a 50:50 joint venture with Alva Brothers Entertainment on 2 March 2009 based in Mumbai, Maharashtra.

== Overview ==
This is the first Hindi entertainment channel launched by Turner Broadcasting System. The channel has been followed by an English general entertainment channel WB from the Turner stable.

== Shutdown ==
The channel ceased all its operations in March 2010 due to low GRPs and minimum viewership. Also, the channel lacked sponsors and new shows since September 2009 and aired re-runs of its former shows.

== Programmes ==
=== Drama ===
- Hindi Hai Hum
- Namak Haraam
- Ninja Pandav (2009)
- Vicky Ki Taxi

=== Reality ===
- Sarkaar Ki Duniya
- Sitaron Ko Choona Hai
- PokerFace: Dil Sachcha Chehra Jhootha
