= Travelxp =

Indian television channel

travelxp
- Logo used since 2015
- Country: India
- Broadcast area: Worldwide
- Headquarters: Tech Web Centre, Oshiwara, Mumbai, Maharashtra

Programming
- Languages: English, German, Polish, Serbian, Croatian, Bulgarian, Slovenian, Czech-Slovak, Russian, Tamil, Hindi,Portuguese, Bengali (Note: Depending on the region, Travelxp is localized in the local language of the region.)
- Picture format: 2160p UHDTV; 1080i HDTV

Ownership
- Owner: Celebrities Management Private Limited
- Sister channels: Hi-Dost! foodxp travelxp Tamil

History
- Launched: 2 February 2011; 15 years ago

Links
- Website: www.travelxp.com

Availability

Terrestrial
- Zuku TV (Kenya): Channel 730
- DishTV: 920
- Tata Play: 765

Streaming media
- travelxp: Website

Travelxp is a pay television channel in India, It airs travel shows. The channel is owned by Celebrities Management (Pvt) Ltd. Its primary language is English, viewers can switch to a number of other languages.

== Background ==
TravelXP started as a pay television channel in India and aired its first show, Xplore Austria, in 2008.

TravelXP is distributed in DTH, cable, IPTV, OTT and FAST platforms as a linear 24-hour television service. It has also licensed its content to various airlines for inflight entertainment in the past. Travelxp HD was amongst the first HD channels in India. In 2016, TravelXP became the first channel with 4K HDR content in the travel niche. Backpack was their first show to be shot in 4K definition, back in 2015.

== Broadcasting ==
TravelXP offers both high definition and standard definition feeds. Travelxp has 8 feeds under its name globally, with 3 channels live in India: Travelxp India (SD), Travelxp Tamil (SD), and Travelxp (HD).

The channel TravelXP HD Europe was launched back in August 2016 in Germany and later in other countries including Hungary and Poland. Travelxp UK covers England, Northern Ireland, Scotland and Wales. Travelxp primarily telecasts in India in English, Hindi and Bengali, and it also has a Tamil subsidiary channel, Travelxp Tamil. TravelXP HD also provides its content in German and Portuguese and provides subtitles in English, German, Czech, Slovenian, Serbian, Croatian and Bulgarian.

== Programmes ==
Travelxp airs following shows : Quest, Fooddicted, 10 days in Korea, XP guide, Xplore Jordan, Backpack, City break, World spas, Heritage, Landmark, Unwind etc.

== Digital ventures ==
With the onset of COVID-19, Travelxp launched its own video-on-demand platform in August 2021. The platform hosts content and travel booking services. The premium content is available only to users with TravelxpRED subscriptions. Currently, it has two subscription plans, RED and RED Plus.

Travelxp launched its TV app on Android TV in September 2021. In February 2022, Travelxp signed a deal with Xiaomi to bring their content to PatchWall- Xiaomi’s discovery platform users.
