= Cartoon Network (Pakistan) =

Pakistani television channel

- Country: Pakistan
- Broadcast area: Pakistan

Programming
- Language(s): Urdu (dubbing)
- Picture format: 576i SDTV

Ownership
- Owner: Warner Bros. Discovery Asia-Pacific

History
- Launched: 2 April 2004; 21 years ago

Links
- Website: www.cartoonnetworkasia.com

Cartoon Network is a Pakistani pay television channel operated by Warner Bros. Discovery. It was launched on 2 April 2004, dedicating itself to Pakistani viewers.

== History ==
On 1 October 2011, Cartoon Network Pakistan changed its logo along with the other Asian feeds, joining the ‘CN’ squares into a perfect rectangle. The channel also premiered The Amazing World of Gumball on the same day. Cartoon Network, along with all other foreign television channels, were suspended in Bangladesh on 2 October 2021, for not broadcasting a clean feed. The channel would start dubbing its programs in Urdu on 21 January 2022.

== Criticism and controversy ==
In 2005, PEMRA issued an order regarding the ban of several channels because they were airing programmes in Hindi as they were dubbed in India. Later, Cartoon Network switched to English versions. In 2010, PEMRA again issued a notice against the channels, the issue was the Hindi dubbed shows on schedule. The ban was not lifted till the end of July 2011.

== Programming ==
=== Current programming ===
- Mr. Bean: The Animated Series
- New Looney Tunes
- Scooby-Doo and Guess Who?
- Teen Titans Go!
- Tom and Jerry
- We Bare Bears

=== Former programming ===
- Archie's Weird Mysteries
- Ben 10 Classic
- Ben 10
- Ben 10: Alien Force
- Ben 10: Omniverse
- Ben 10: Ultimate Alien
- Dexter's Laboratory
- Generator Rex
- ¡Mucha Lucha!
- Pokémon
- Popeye the Sailor
- Talking Tom & Friends
- The Powerpuff Girls
