= Discovery Kids (India) =

Indian television channel

- Logo used since 2018.
- Country: India
- Broadcast area: Indian subcontinent; Afghanistan
- Headquarters: Mumbai, Maharashtra, India

Programming
- Languages: Hindi; Telugu; Kannada; Malayalam; Tamil; English
- Picture format: 576i SDTV

Ownership
- Owner: Warner Bros. Discovery India
- Sister channels: See List of channels owned by Warner Bros. Discovery India

History
- Launched: 7 August 2012

Links
- Website: DKids

Discovery Kids is an Indian cable and satellite television channel operated by Warner Bros. Discovery India. The channel launched on 7 August 2012. The channel primarily airs animated shows in Hindi, Telugu, Kannada, Malayalam, and Tamil.

== History ==
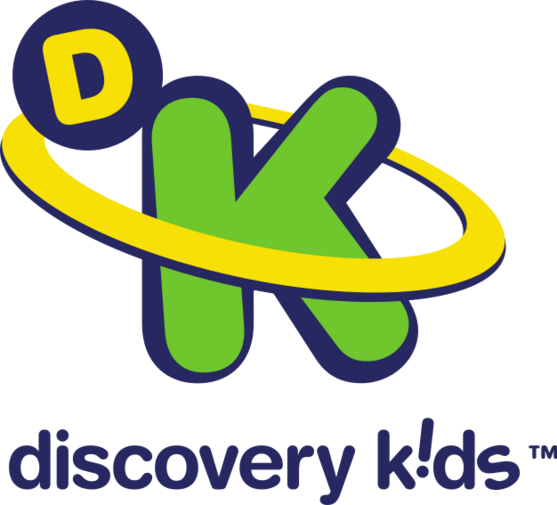
Logo formerly used by Discovery Kids since 2012 until 2018.

Discovery Kids is the first channel in the kids' genre in India by Discovery Networks Asia Pacific launched on 7 August 2012 in English, Hindi, and Tamil. Earlier it was the name of an Infotainment and edutainment kids programming block on Discovery Channel India which ran from 2001 to 2005.

Discovery India announced plans to revamp the channel in 2018 with new IPs. The revamp began the same day Discovery Jeet launched by removing all existing shows, except for Mister Maker at night and airing ZeeQ's Bandbudh Aur Budbak the whole day.

Later, the channel changed its logo to the current logo. To expand its reach in the South, a Tamil-language audio track was added again and later a Telugu-language audio track on 1 April 2018.

The revamp was ultimately completed on 21 April 2018, coinciding with the premiere of Discovery's latest local animation property at time, called Little Singham, based on the original Singham film from 2011. The show launched with 156 episodes and five TV feature films. The English Audio Track was added again in July and was removed on 22 April 2020. Kannada and Malayalam were added on 19 October 2019.

Discovery Kids saw an increase in ratings since the release of Bandbudh Aur Budbak on the channel. The launch of Little Singham helped the channel to achieve second position in the kids genre, with a reach of 24 million and 111 minutes per viewer.

On 8 November 2021, Discovery Kids India launched Doki from Latin America.

The Warner Bros. Discovery India merger was held in mid-July 2022, making both Cartoon Network and Pogo sister channels to Discovery Kids. Following the merger, on 13 November 2022, Discovery Kids stopped airing Little Singham and replaced it with Roll No 21. Little Singham moved to Pogo on 24 December 2022.

On 3 April 2023, the channel launched Mr. Bean: The Animated Series.

On 22 May 2023, the channel launched The Tom and Jerry Show and Tom and Jerry Tales.

The Grim Adventures of Billy & Mandy, an original show of Cartoon Network premiered on the channel on 19 June 2023.

The channel launched Batwheels, which is an original show of Cartoonito on 15 July 2023.

The channel launched the live action series of Mr. Bean on 9 September 2023.

In March 2026, the channel started airing another Cartoon Network original series i.e. We Bare Bears.
