= Discovery Channel (India) =

Indian television channel

- Logo used since 2019
- Country: India
- Broadcast area: Indian subcontinent
- Headquarters: Mumbai, Maharashtra, India

Programming
- Languages: English; Telugu; Tamil (as Discovery Tamil); Bengali; Hindi
- Picture format: 1080i HDTV

Ownership
- Owner: Warner Bros. Discovery India
- Sister channels: See List of channels owned by Warner Bros. Discovery India

History
- Launched: 15 August 1995; 31 years ago

Links
- Website: Discovery India

Availability - Available on all major Indian DTH & Cables.

Terrestrial
- DVB-T2 (India): Check local frequencies

Streaming media
- Discovery+ (India): SD & HD
- Jio TV (India): SD & HD
- Amazon Prime Video (India): SD & HD

Discovery Channel (often referred to as simply Discovery) is an Indian pay television channel owned by Warner Bros. Discovery for the Indian subcontinent. Launched on 15 August 1995. It is the Indian version of Discovery Channel. It is available in five languages including Hindi, English, Telugu and Bengali. while the Tamil language has a separate dedicated channel DTamil. The channel can be viewed on digital cable and satellite television in India. The channel also available on its OTT services Discovery Plus.

== History ==
The channel was launched on 15 August 1995. At that time the channel mostly aired shows from its American counterpart.

On March 31, 2008, Discovery unveiled a new logo, which took effect on-air on April 15, 2008 (coinciding with the fourth season premiere of Deadliest Catch). The new logo was designed by Viewpoint Creative, and integrated Discovery's long-time globe iconography into the "D" lettering of the wordmark, creating a monogram that was usable as a standalone icon. The launch was accompanied by a new advertising campaign, "The World is Just Awesome", which featured scenes of Discovery personalities singing an adapted version of the song "I Love the Mountains". Discovery Channel president John Ford explained that the campaign was intended to "showcase our earned place in the greater pop culture landscape".

In August 2013 (coinciding with Shark Week), the aforementioned monogram became the main on-air logo as part of a new imaging campaign, "Grab Life By the Globe", which was designed to emphasize the channel's current focus on personality-driven programming. The logo was portrayed in promos with visual effects relevant to their respective program.

On April 1, 2019, Discovery unveiled a new logo, maintaining a refreshed version of the previous globe and D monogram. The new branding is accompanied by another new imaging campaign, "The World is Ours", which features scenes of Discovery personalities singing the Blue Swede version of "Hooked on a Feeling". The static version of the globe icon uses a non-standard projection that shows all continents, reflecting Discovery's presence as an international brand.

In 2021, Amazon Prime Video started streaming Discovery Channel along with its sister channels.

Discovery also partnered with Byju's for Discovery School Super League, a critical thinking and aptitude-based quiz competition where students can go from representing their schools to representing their states in a nationally televised contest.

=== Logos ===
Logo Used by Discovery India from 2010 - 2016.

Logo Used by Discovery India From 2016 - 2019

Logo currently used by Discovery India

== Original programming ==
=== Current Programming ===
- A Haunting
- American Digger
- Asian Provocateur
- Bear Grylls Survival School
- Breaking Point: Commando School Belgaum
- Devil's Canyon
- Discovery Hits
- Dual Survival
- Ed Stafford: Into The Unknown
- Expedition Unknown With Josh Gates
- Gold Rush
- Food Factory
- Hour China
- How Do They Do It?
- How It's Made
- India's Best Jobs
- India's Citizen Squad
- India's Ultimate Warrior
- In Inner Mongolia
- Man vs. Wild
- My 600-lb Life
- Man, Woman, Wild
- Naked and Afraid
- River Monsters
- Real Story Of...
- Revealed: Slachen
- Ross Kemp: Extreme World
- Top 5 Stay Alive
- Veer by Discovery
- Walking The Himalayas
- What Went Down
- Wild Frank
- You Have Been Warned

=== Original Shows ===
This is the list of shows produced by Discovery India.

- Chadar, the Ice Trail
- Everest: Indian Army Women's Expedition
- Ganges
- Journey of India
- India's Best Jobs
- India's Citizen Squad
- India: Living Traditions/Medical Miracle India
- India's Ultimate Warrior
- Revealed: Rashtrapati Bhavan
- Revealed: The Golden Temple
- Revealed: The Line of Control
- Revealed: National Defense Academy
- Revealed: Rann of Kutch
- The Discovery of India
- Veer by Discover
- Wildest India

== Associated channels ==
=== Discovery HD ===
Discovery HD
- Country: India
- Broadcast area: Indian subcontinent
- Headquarters: Mumbai, Maharashtra, India

Programming
- Languages: English; Telugu; Tamil(as Discovery Tamil); Bengali; Hindi
- Picture format: 1080i HDTV

Ownership
- Owner: Warner Bros. Discovery India
- Sister channels: See List of channels owned by Warner Bros. Discovery in India

History
- Launched: 5 March 2010
- Former names: Discovery HD World

Availability

Streaming media
- Discovery+ (India): SD & HD
- Jio TV (India): SD & HD

Discovery HD (formerly known as Discovery HD World) is the HD time shift version of Discovery Channel India operated by Warner Bros. Discovery for the Indian subcontinent. Launched on 5 March 2010. The channel runs time shift to main channel. It is available in five languages including English, Hindi, Telugu and Bengali and while the Tamil language has a separate dedicated channel Discovery Tamil. The channel can be viewed on digital cable and satellite television in India. The Discovery Channel has also launched its OTT services Discovery Plus recently.

=== DTamil ===
DTamil is a separate Tamil dedicated channel of Discovery Channel. The channel can be viewed on digital cable and satellite television in India. The channel is also available on its OTT services Discovery Plus recently.

== Non-television ventures ==
=== Discovery School Super League ===
Discovery partnered with Byju's for Discovery School Super League, a critical thinking and aptitude-based quiz competition where students can go from representing their schools to representing their states in a nationally televised contest and win prizes along the way. DSSL is the national-level inter-school contest being telecasted on the Discovery channel. DSSL is an aptitude-based competition that provides a platform for students to compete and win awards. Students studying between Class 4 to Class 9 can apply for this contest. In 2022 season 5 was premiered.

== Digital channels ==
=== Veer by Discovery ===
Veer by Discovery is India's first dedicated digital channel for the Indian Armed Forces. The debut series, "Battle Ops", premiered on Discovery Channel & Veer by Discovery digital channel on 26 January 2018. Other series on Veer include "India's Citizen Squad" and "Breaking Point: Indian Air Force Academy" (part of the larger Breaking Point franchise) among other shows.

== Marketing and branding ==
On March 31, 2008, Discovery unveiled a new logo, which took effect on-air on April 15, 2008 (coinciding with the fourth season premiere of Deadliest Catch). The new logo was designed by Viewpoint Creative, and integrated Discovery's long-time globe iconography into the "D" lettering of the wordmark, creating a monogram that was usable as a standalone icon. The launch was accompanied by a new advertising campaign, "The World is Just Awesome", which featured scenes of Discovery personalities singing an adapted version of the song "I Love the Mountains". Discovery Channel president John Ford explained that the campaign was intended to "showcase our earned place in the greater pop culture landscape".

In August 2013 (coinciding with Shark Week), the aforementioned monogram became the main on-air logo as part of a new imaging campaign, "Grab Life By the Globe", which was designed to emphasize the channel's current focus on personality-driven programming. The logo was portrayed in promos with visual effects relevant to their respective program.

On April 1, 2019, Discovery unveiled a new logo, maintaining a refreshed version of the previous globe and D monogram. The new branding is accompanied by another new imaging campaign, "The World is Ours", which features scenes of Discovery personalities singing the Blue Swede version of "Hooked on a Feeling". The static version of the globe icon uses a non-standard projection that shows all continents, reflecting Discovery's presence as an international brand.

== See also ==
- Cartoon Network
- CNN International
- Discovery Science
- HBO
- Pogo
- WB Channel
