= Cartoon Network (India) =

Indian television channel

- Logo used since 2011
- Country: India
- Broadcast area: Indian subcontinent (except Bangladesh, Maldives and Pakistan)
- Headquarters: Mumbai, Maharashtra, India

Programming
- Languages: Hindi; English (Only GTPL); Telugu; Kannada; Malayalam; Marathi (Only JioTV); Tamil
- Picture format: 1080i HDTV

Ownership
- Owner: Warner Bros. Discovery India
- Sister channels: See List of channels owned by Warner Bros. Discovery India

History
- Launched: 1995; 31 years ago

Links
- Website: Cartoon Network India (defunct, redirects to network's YouTube channel.) (archived version)

Availability – Available on all major Indian DTH & cable providers.

Cartoon Network (often abbreviated as CN) is an Indian cable and satellite television channel owned and operated by Skydance under Warner Bros. Discovery India. It is the Indian equivalent of the original American network and was launched on 1 May 1995 as the first television channel in India dedicated to children. The channel primarily airs animated programming in Hindi, Telugu, Kannada, Malayalam, Marathi, and Tamil.

== History ==
=== Launch ===
The original Cartoon Network logo, used from 1 May 1995 to 30 September 2005. The logo is still in use as a trademark.

Cartoon Network was the first dedicated children's television channel in India, which was launched on 1 May 1995, as a dual-channel with Cartoon Network operating from 5:30 a.m. to 3:00 p.m. (later 4:00 p.m. in early 1997, followed by 5:30 p.m., 8p.m. by 1998, 9:00 p.m. from mid-1998 to 2001, and finally 10 p.m.) and Turner Classic Movies (formerly TNT) taking up the remainder of the daily schedule. On 1 July 2001, Cartoon Network India commenced daily full-day broadcasts.

In early 2004, a separate feed of the channel dedicated to Pakistani and Bangladeshi viewers was launched.

=== 1990s ===
Cartoon Network India initially only aired Hanna-Barbera cartoons such as The Yogi Bear Show, Top Cat, The Flintstones, and Scooby-Doo. The channel quickly started to develop, with them airing MGM cartoons such as Tom and Jerry, Droopy, and Spike and Tyke for the first time in 1996, and after Time Warner's purchase of Turner in 1996, Warner Bros. produced cartoons such as Looney Tunes in 1997. In 1998, Cartoon Network India began airing Cartoon Network originals, such as Space Ghost Coast to Coast and The Moxy Show. In its early years, the channel broadcast only in English. At the time, the Indian market was able to understand English without creating language barriers, as the "link language in the subcontinent". Turner's initial strategy for India was all in English, devoid of subtitles and dubbing in national and regional languages, and catered the English-speaking niche, unlike its competitor Star TV. Bob Ross, president of Turner International at the time, was aiming a certain percentage of the English-fluent market, using its vast library assets. After capturing such percentage, there were possible plans to localise the signal to Tamil and Hindi.

On 4 January 1999, the channel started to offer Hindi-dubbed versions of its shows, such as Scooby-Doo, Where Are You!, The Flintstones, The Jetsons, Speed Racer, SWAT Kats: The Radical Squadron, The Mask: Animated Series, The Addams Family, The Real Adventures of Jonny Quest, Captain Planet, Tom & Jerry Kids and certain other select programs. Initially they air as daily two hours blocks (3 to 5pm on weekdays and 2 to 4pm on weekends). Anshuman Mishra, head of the channel, believed that the step had to be taken in October 1998 in order to reduce the influence of violent cartoons.

On 23 August 1999, the channel received a rebrand, introducing new bumpers, new shows and a new "powerhouse" theme. The new shows for 1999 were its original shows Dexter's Laboratory, Cow and Chicken, I Am Weasel, Ed, Edd n Eddy, and Johnny Bravo.

=== 2000s ===
The following year, 2000, saw more Cartoon Network originals being introduced, including The Powerpuff Girls, Mike, Lu & Og, and Courage the Cowardly Dog. DC Animated Universe series started premiering in 2000s starting with Batman: The Animated Series, The Adventures of Batman and Robin, and The New Batman Adventures in 2000, Batman Beyond and Superman: The Animated Series in 2001, and Justice League in 2002. On 28 February 2000, a Tamil feed was launched on the network.

In 2001, Sheep in the Big City, Time Squad, and Samurai Jack premiered in India. On 1 July 2001, Cartoon Network became a 24-hour channel.

In September 2001, the Toonami block was introduced that primarily consists of Japanese anime and occasionally American action animation like Dragon Ball Z, Cardcaptors, Transformers: Robots in Disguise, and Superman: The Animated Series. A Night Shift block was introduced in November 2001 to target teens and adults. The programming included Birdman and the Galaxy Trio, The Brak Show, Galtar and the Golden Lance, and Harvey Birdman, Attorney at Law.

In 2002, Cartoon Network signed deal with Mattel to air Barbie films starting with Barbie as Rapunzel, which premiered on 4 November 2002.

On 27 January 2003, Tiny TV, a preschool programming block, was launched. This block was later moved to sister channel Pogo TV. The channel also started acquiring local series and films in 2003 starting with The Adventures of Tenali Raman. Other acquisitions include series like The Adventures of Chhota Birbal, Akbar and Birbal, Jungle Tales and television films like Vikram and Betaal. Pokémon series was launched on 26 May 2003.

The anime series Beyblade was also launched on 3 June 2005, which enjoyed a No. 1 or No. 2 position in the kids genre, along with Pokémon.

Cartoon Network's second logo, used in various forms and styles from 1 October 2005 to 30 September 2011

On 1 October 2005, the bumpers were replaced with 3D animations of the 'CN (Cartoon Network) City' that all the Cartoon Network toon characters lived in. Show-specific bumpers were replaced with 3D animations of a well-known scene from the particular show (e.g., a Dexter's Laboratory bumper would feature Dexter's house, a Powerpuff Girls bumper would feature most likely the PPG household, and so forth). The retro checkerboard logo was replaced with the new 'CN' city-style logo.

The Life and Times of Juniper Lee premiered on CN India on 11 September 2005.

Cartoon Network continued to air new episodes and seasons from Beyblade, Pokémon, and their movies, which continued to rank No. 1 and No. 2 in the kids' genre. Half Ticket Express a preschool block was launched which aired series like Dragon Tales, Franklin, and The Koala Brothers. Another programming block Thoda Meow Thoda Bow featuring Tom and Jerry, Scooby-Doo, and The Sylvester & Tweety Mysteries was launched on Children's Day.

On 12 April 2005, Cartoon Network aired Dragon Ball GT and a television special with Aamir Khan to promote Mangal Pandey: The Rising. In this interview style special Khan is interviewed by Johnny Bravo.

Camp Lazlo was launched on 12 February 2006.

On 10 October 2006, Cartoon Network began to air a new series, Ben 10.

Cartoon Network launched an action series titled Gransazers on the action block Toonami in January 2007 and later Justirisers on 7 March 2007, and the singer Shankar Mahadevan sang its title track in Hindi. The series after airing all episodes was replaced by Sazer X on 3 July 2007 in which Shaan sung the title track. The Boomerang programming block was launched in August 2007 which aired classic properties like Tom & Jerry, Scooby-Doo, Popeye, and Jackie Chan Adventures.

On 11 December 2008, Cartoon Network began to air the next series in the Ben 10 franchise, Ben 10: Alien Force. It also aired new Ben 10 movies.

On 28 June 2009, an episode of Johnny Bravo titled Johnny Goes to Bollywood was aired exclusively in India. The special was produced by Famous House of Animation in Mumbai.

Other notable series acquired by Cartoon Network India were The Adventures of Tintin (2001), Spider-Man: The New Animated Series (2003), Archie's Weird Mysteries (2004), Jumanji (2004), Transformers: Armada (2004), and The Spectacular Spider-Man (2009).

=== 2010s ===
Cartoon Network started the third series in the Ben 10 franchise, Ben 10: Ultimate Alien on 10 October 2010. Cartoon Network launched Roll No. 21 in November 2010, multiple season and TV movies were launched after the success of first season. The new Beyblade series, Beyblade: Metal Fusion started airing from 11 October 2010.

On 1 October 2011, Cartoon Network introduced its new branding and logo. Designed by Brand New School, it makes heavy use of the black and white checkerboard motif, as well as CMYK color variations and patterns. The slogan "It's a Fun Thing!" was also introduced. The second season Beyblade: Metal Masters started airing from 22 October 2011.

As the slogan suggests, comedy programs began to occupy most of the timeslots. While initially Tom and Jerry made up most of the time slots, later when Oggy and the Cockroaches was started on the Indian feed in July 2012, In 2012, Cartoon Network added a Telugu audio track. CN began to air Oggy and the Cockroaches and Tom and Jerry for hours together each day, which continued until 2014. In January 2015, Cartoon Network India lost the rights to Oggy and the Cockroaches Seasons 1 to 3, but continued to air Season 4.

CN started the fourth series in the hit Ben 10 franchise, Ben 10: Omniverse on 26 November 2012.

Starting from the new era, "It's a Fun Thing", CN began to air shows without providing any information through airings on the channel, like on-air promos and bumpers. ThunderCats, Beyblade Metal Masters, Beyblade Metal Fury, and Scooby-Doo! Mystery Incorporated were started with no information about air date and timings on the channel, and information present only on TV schedules.

Animated shows like Green Lantern: The Animated Series, DreamWorks Dragons, Scooby-Doo! Mystery Incorporated, The Looney Tunes Show, and ThunderCats aired, but for some reason all of these shows aired only the first seasons, and the second seasons haven't been aired yet. In 2013, The third season Beyblade: Metal Fury started airing from 27 October 2013. Cartoon Network acquired the rights of Krrish franchise's animated film series Kid Krrish. The first movie Kid Krrish on 2 October 2013. The film was followed by three additional movies Kid Krrish: Mission Bhutan (premiered on 19 July 2014), Kid Krrish: Mystery in Mongolia (premiered on 27 September 2014), and Kid Krrish: Shakalaka Africa (premiered on 25 April 2015).

A television film Chakra: The Invincible based on the character created by Stan Lee aired on 30 November 2013.

CN moved the hit series Pokémon to its sister channel Pogo in 2011, having aired until the eleventh season, but later brought it back on CN in 2014, starting from the fourteenth season of Pokémon Black and White.

In the summer of 2015, new shows like Uncle Grandpa, Beyblade: Shogun Steel, Clarence, and new episodes of Ben 10: Omniverse started to air. In May 2015, Cartoon Network India celebrated its 20th birthday with specials of various shows including specials from the classic The Flintstones. Starting June 2015, it started to air new promos for each new episode of weekly-once shows like Steven Universe, Ben 10: Omniverse, and Uncle Grandpa.

Cartoon Network celebrated the 20th anniversary of its Indian feed throughout May 2015. A programming block Happy Birthday Cartoon Network which aired ongoing series like Horrid Henry and Oggy and the Cockroaches as well as classic series like The Flintstones, The Grim Adventures of Billy & Mandy, and Courage the Cowardly Dog.

In December 2015, Cartoon Network aired two specials for the promotion of Hindi film Dilwale. The first special Kris Aur Shahrukh Khan Ki Dilwale Bollywood Class aired on 19 December while Oggy Ki Birthday Party aired on 25 December.

The Powerpuff Girls reboot series premiered on 9 April 2016 in India and other Asian Pacific countries while the Ben 10 reboot premiered on 8 October 2016.

Since 2016, CN India started showing the programmes in 16:9 aspect ratio, however Cartoon Network is still natively in 4:3.

In August 2017, Cartoon Network also aired some classic shows during weekend nights on a block called Get Tooned with Toonami, but was abruptly discontinued in October in favour of Dragon Ball Super.

On 10 June 2017, Cartoon Network premiered Craig of the Creek.

On 1 September 2017, the Bang Zoom dub of Dragon Ball Super started airing weekends on Cartoon Network at a later time slot without any promotion. It was previously aired on Toonami until it became a classic cartoon channel. In mid December 2017, Cartoon Network quietly started airing Dragon Ball Z movies on Sunday nights.

Dragon Ball Super replaced Dragon Ball Z's late night time slot from 1 January 2018 onwards.

In September 2018, Cartoon Network India started to premiere new shows such as Unikitty, OK K.O! Let's Be Heroes, Ben 10 Challenge, and Running Man.

The channel celebrated 20th anniversary of The Powerpuff Girls and announced a special "The Pow-fect Girls" (a list featuring 20 extraordinary women).

In July 2019, the channel premiered Mr. Magoo at 5PM (IST) every weekday.

Cartoon Network India brought back the Tom and Jerry franchise in 2019 with Tom and Jerry Tales and The Tom and Jerry Show (2014). It was previously moved to Pogo TV.

Other notable television series launched in 2010s were Horrid Henry (9 April 2012), Teen Titans Go! (23 March 2015), and Mighty Magiswords (6 May 2017).

=== 2020s ===
In April 2020, Cartoon Network India removed its English audio feed and acquired the ZeeQ television series Bandbudh Aur Budbak. The fourth season of The Tom and Jerry Show was premiered on 14 November 2020 with a new voiceover commentary.

On 22 February 2021, Super Shiro, a spin-off series of Crayon Shin-chan, made its debut in India on Cartoon Network. In March 2021, CN also started Nate Is Late. The channel created their own animated series titled Dabangg, based on the film series, on 31 May 2021. On 27 June 2021, the channel premiered its first original CGI animated series, Ekans: Ek Se Badhkar Snake.

The channel celebrated the International Cat Day, with back-to-back episodes of The Tom and Jerry Show broadcast on 8 August 2021, using the Cat-Toon Network moniker, which was also used by the American network to celebrate April Fools' Day. The third season of Grizzy & the Lemmings titled Grizzy & the Lemmings: World Tour was also started from 9 August 2021. A three seven-minute special episode of Lamput premiered on 14 August 2021. On 22 August 2021, the Ben 10,010 movie premiered on the channel in the form of Ben 10 Special.

In November 2021, Cartoon Network aired the Harry Potter film series. Cartoon Network also began airing Taffy on 24 January 2022.

For celebrating the 82nd anniversary of Tom and Jerry, the channel aired Tom and Jerry Tales from 7 to 11 February at 10:30 AM IST onwards. However, it was continued until late April 2022 at a different timing with the other series of Tom and Jerry like The Tom and Jerry Show (1975), The Tom and Jerry Show (2014), and its 1940–1975 theatrical shorts. The network also started newer series of Tom and Jerry like Tom and Jerry in New York from 18 March 2022.

On 30 March 2022, Cartoon Network India began using the "Redraw Your World" branding and graphics, like its US and Asian counterparts. With the rebrand, Cartoon Network also announced the launch of the Cartoonito block on the channel.

On 22 May 2022, Cartoon Network India aired the Dragon Ball Super marathon, Dragon Ball Super Sunday.

The new season of Teen Titans Go! was premiered on the channel on 26 June 2022 in the form of a marathon, Teen Titans Go! Super Sunday. In July 2022, the channel launched a new programming block Morning Laughter Club at 7:00 AM IST onwards. It mainly broadcast shows like The Tom and Jerry Show, Lamput, Maca & Roni and Taffy.

On 24 October 2022, the channel premiered Digimon Adventure.

On 15 January 2023, the channel premiered Mechamato, and relaunched Digimon Adventures on 19 February in the form of Digimon Adventures Super Sunday.

The channel premiered Dragon Ball Z Kai on 16 April 2023 in five languages including Hindi, Tamil, Telugu, Kannada and Malayalam.

From 23 April 2023, the channel began airing Dragon Ball movies on Sundays in the form of Dragon Ball Z Blockbuster, starting with Dragon Ball Z: Cooler's Revenge in five languages including Hindi, Tamil, Telugu, Kannada and Malayalam. And premiered Dragon Ball Z Kai: The Final Chapters in August 2023.

In August 2023, Cartoon Network announced that it would air the popular shōnen anime My Hero Academia on the channel. The channel premiered the series on 10 September 2023 in five languages including Hindi, Tamil, Telugu, Kannada and Malayalam.

On 16 September 2023, on the occasion of the 84th Batman Day, the channel aired Batman: The Animated Series at 6:30PM (Indian Standard Time).

In October 2023, the channel premiered Ben 10-Generator Rex: Heroes United for the first time in the form of Ben 10.10.10 Special on 10 October. And on 21 October 2023, the channel along with its sister channel Pogo premiered first ever localized version of Tom and Jerry animated by two Animation Studios based in India and Singapore.

The channel premiered the My Hero Academia movies on 3 December 2023 in the form of My Hero Academia Blockbuster.

In January 2024, the "Big Block Anime" (a programming block) was introduced on 21 January, featuring a lineup primarily consisting of anime animations such as Dragon Ball Super, Dragon Ball Z Kai, and My Hero Academia. Additionally, the channel premiered We Baby Bears on 29 January.

On 5 May 2024, the channel premiered One Piece.

The channel premiered Dragon Ball Z: Bardock – The Father of Goku on 1 September 2024, and Dragon Ball on 1 October 2024.

In October 2024, the channel announced that it will be bringing Dragon Ball Z's eighteenth animated feature film, Dragon Ball Z: Battle of Gods, to India.

Cartoon Network reintroduced One Piece to Indian audiences after 18 years, beginning with Season 1. This time, the channel aired the original Japanese version of the series, instead of the 4Kids adaptation that had previously been broadcast in 2006. Due to this shift to the Japanese version, the series had been redubbed in Hindi, Tamil, Telugu as well as receiving new dubbed versions in Kannada, and Malayalam to cater to a linguistically diverse audience across India. The premiere was scheduled for Sunday, December 8, 2024, at 1 PM IST.

In December 2024, the channel announced that it would air One Piece's first non-canon film, One Piece: The Movie, on 5 January 2025 in India.

During the same period, the channel announced that it would air Bionic Max on 23 December.

On December 22, 2025, the channel received an audio track in the Marathi language, aimed at Marathi-speaking audiences, via JioTV.

== Programming block ==
Logo used for Cartoon Network on Zee block during its broadcast

Zee TV launched a Cartoon Network programming block on 14 August 2002, replacing Nickelodeon's programming block. The block featured programs like Scooby-Doo, The Mask: Animated Series, The Powerpuff Girls, Dexter's Laboratory, Pinky and the Brain, Samurai Jack, The Real Adventures of Jonny Quest, The Flintstones, The Jetsons, Tom & Jerry Kids, Superman: The Animated Series, Captain Planet, Ed, Edd n Eddy, The Road Runner Show, Courage the Cowardly Dog, Sheep in the Big City, Mike, Lu & Og, Sylvester and Tweety Mysteries, and Batman: The Animated Series. It aired programs twice in a day.

On 8 July 2006, DD National introduced a Cartoon Network block named "Cartoon Network ki Duniya" which aired programs like Codename: Kids Next Door, M.A.D. (from sister channel Pogo), and Galli Galli Sim Sim.

== Related channels and services ==
=== Pogo TV ===
Logo used for POGO on its launch

Pogo was launched on January 1, 2004, as a companion channel of Cartoon Network. Broadcasting primarily animated and live action programming. From 2021, it airs only original Indian animation shows becoming WarnerMedia's only for Indian children's channel. But from 2022, the channel again started international shows like Mr. Bean: The Animated Series, Yo-kai Watch, Grizzy and the Lemmings etc. The channel broadcasts in Hindi, Tamil, Telugu, Kannada, Malayalam, Marathi.

=== Cartoon Network HD+ ===
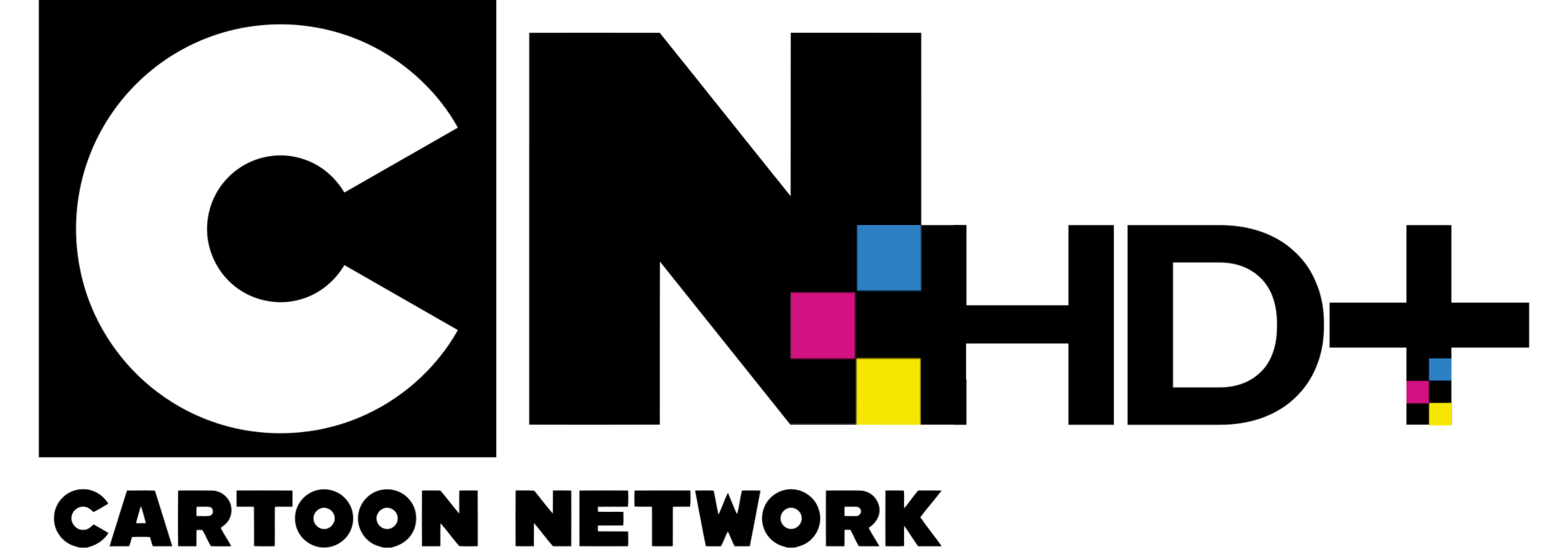
Logo used for Cartoon Network HD+

Cartoon Network HD+ (CN HD+) is a high-definition television channel launched on 15 April 2018. Operating as an ad-free platform, it initially debuted in India, it later expanded its reach to prominent operators in neighbouring countries. Notably, the channel offers content in four languages, including Hindi, Tamil, and Telugu, alongside English.

On December 22, 2025, the channel received three new audio tracks in Malayalam, Kannada, and Marathi via JioTV.

=== Toonami ===
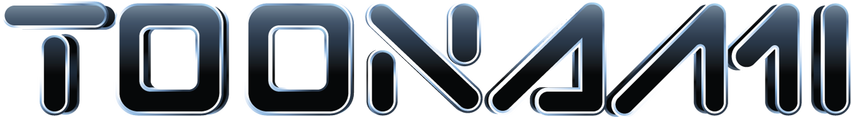
Logo used by the Indian feed of Toonami

Toonami, initially launched as a programming block in 2001, later transitioned into a channel on 26 February 2015 in English and Hindi, becoming a sister channel to Cartoon Network and Pogo. With a primary focus on showcasing mature animation content, it was based animation/anime genre, dedicated to catering to audiences seeking more mature-themed programming.

In July 2017, the channel underwent a significant revamp, transitioning into classic animation channel before ceasing operations completely at the end of 15 May 2018.

=== Digital and OTT deals ===
On 24 June 2016, Turner India signed a distribution deal with Viacom 18's OTT app Voot. Through this strategic tie-up Voot can stream Turner's properties from Cartoon Network and Pogo TV like The Powerpuff Girls, Ben 10, Dexter's Laboratory, Roll No. 21, Samurai Jack, Johnny Bravo, and M.A.D in their Kids section.

On 29 August 2017, Turner International India signed a deal with Amazon Prime Video India. Through this deal Amazon can stream Cartoon Network shows like Ben 10, Ben 10: Alien Force, Ben 10: Ultimate Alien, Ben 10: Omniverse, Johnny Bravo, The Powerpuff Girls, Kumbh Karan, Roll No. 21, and Dexter's Laboratory in their Kids and Family section.

In 2023, Warner Bros. Discovery India signed a deal with JioCinema. Through this deal JioCinema can stream Cartoon Network, Warner Bros. and HBO content on their OTT.

=== CN+ ===
In 2014, Cartoon Network partnered with Tata Sky to launch an active service called CN+. The service is available every day for about one to two hours. It aired select episodes from hit programmes such as Ben 10 (and related series), Beyblade: Metal Fusion (and related series), Cartoon Network Original Shows like The Amazing World of Gumball, League of Super Evil, Tom and Jerry (and related series), Ed, Edd n Eddy, and movies from Ben 10 and Pokémon among others.

=== CN Rewind ===
In 2024, Warner Bros. Discovery partnered with Prime Video to launch CN Rewind, a digital channel available as an add-on service exclusively in India. The channel features a curated collection of classic Cartoon Network shows, offering Indian audiences access to a wide range of iconic animated series. These include timeless favorites such as The Powerpuff Girls, Tom & Jerry, Scooby-Doo, Johnny Bravo, Looney Tunes, Dexter's Laboratory, Samurai Jack, Ed, Edd n Eddy, and many others, catering to fans of all ages.

== Transmission ==
The channel broadcasts in India as well as several neighbouring countries.

The channel used to broadcast in Pakistan till 2004 when the authorities issued an order regarding the ban of several channels because they were airing programmes in Hindi as they were dubbed in India. A separate feed of the channel dedicated to Pakistani and Bangladeshi viewers was launched in 2004.

In 2018 the separate HD feed of the channel was launched, that started broadcasting along with the main feed.

== See also ==
- Cartoon Network HD+
- Discovery Kids
- Pogo
- Tiny TV, a preschool programming block on Pogo.
- List of Indian animated television series
