= Imagine Showbiz =

- Country: India
- Headquarters: Mumbai, Maharashtra

Ownership
- Owner: Reliance Anil Dhirubhai Ambani Group

History
- Launched: August 15, 2008; 16 years ago
- Closed: April 4, 2011; 14 years ago
- Replaced by: Big Magic

Links
- Website: imagineshowbiz.com

Imagine Showbiz was a 24-hour Bollywood music channel catering to Indian youth owned by Reliance Anil Dhirubhai Ambani Group based in Mumbai.

== History ==
The channel went on air on 15 August 2008 as NDTV Imagine Showbiz. Imagine Showbiz Ltd. was a JV company between NDTV Group and Cinestar Advertising Private Ltd.

On 8 December 2009, it was announced that Turner Asia Pacific Ventures (a wholly owned subsidiary Turner Broadcasting System) had acquired a 92 per cent stake in NDTV Imagine Ltd. NDTV's 76 per cent stake in NDTV Imagine would be given to Turner for $67 million, the Time Warner company would acquire fresh equity worth $50 million to get 92 percent control. NDTV Imagine Ltd. runs NDTV Imagine, NDTV Lumiere and NDTV Imagine Showbiz television channels and film production and distribution company, NDTV Imagine Film Co. The purchase received approval from the Time Warner board on 17 December 2009. At the end of the $126.5 million deal, Turner held 92% in NDTV Imagine Ltd. while 3.2% was retained by NDTV Networks and the remaining 4.8% was held by its chief executive officer Sameer Nair and other Imagine employees.

NDTV announced on 24 February 2010 that it had received all the regulatory approvals and the transaction had been concluded on 23 February by transfer of shares, amounting to 85.68 per cent of NDTV Imagine Ltd, by NDTV Networks Plc to Turner Asia Pacific Ventures. The three channels would be under Turner General Entertainment Networks, a holding company that will infuse fresh capital to fund the network's growth. The 'NDTV' brand was dropped out and the channels were relabelled Imagine TV, Lumiere Movies and Imagine Showbiz.

In January 2011, Reliance Broadcast Network Ltd (RBNL), part of the Anil Dhirubhai Ambani Group, confirmed a proposed acquisition of Imagine Showbiz from Cinestar, who had bought the entire 51 percent stake held by its JV partner Turner International. The acquisition by RBNL was to included a 100% purchase of Imagine Showbiz's shareholding, along with other assets including intellectual property rights, music library, Bollywood content, technical expertise, including studios and equipment and the existing distribution network. Imagine Showbiz was to be renamed and repositioned as a full-on music channel.

This channel was removed in April 4, 2011.

== Programmes ==
- 99 Films You Must Watch Before You Die
- Angrezi Mein Kaise Kehte Hain
- Bollywood DéTales
- Baba's Cross Connection
- Crash Course
- Full Time Pass
- Haute Stuff
- Jeete Raho Bollywood
- Premix
- Look Hot And Fit Like Your Star
- Meter Down
- Mind Blowing
- No Biz Like Showbiz
- New & Improved
- Retake
- Showbiz Up To Date
- Spot In
- Tease Me
- Wanted
- Your Attention Please
