= Lumiere Movies =

- Lumiere Movies Logo
- Country: India
- Broadcast area: South Asia, particularly India
- Headquarters: Mumbai, Maharashtra, India

Programming
- Language: English (subtitles)
- Picture format: 480i (SDTV); 720p (HDTV)

Ownership
- Owner: Turner Broadcasting System (WarnerMedia)

History
- Launched: 2009
- Closed: 2012

Lumière Movies was an Indian 24-hour movie channel dedicated to foreign films owned by Turner Broadcasting System (a subsidiary of Time Warner) based in Mumbai.

The channel was launched by NDTV Group in joint venture with Alliance Lumière Pvt. Ltd as NDTV Lumière. The channel provided access to the worldwide films following their release. The channel also hosted events and promotions, such as conducting workshops with film personalities and interviews with the directors and the cast.

On 8 December 2009, it was announced that Turner Asia Pacific Ventures (a wholly owned subsidiary Turner Broadcasting System) had acquired a 92 per cent stake in NDTV Imagine Ltd. NDTV's 76 per cent stake in NDTV Imagine would be given to Turner for $67 million, the Time Warner company would acquire fresh equity worth $50 million to get 92 per cent control. NDTV Imagine Ltd. runs NDTV Imagine, NDTV Lumiere and NDTV Imagine Showbiz television channels and film production and distribution company, NDTV Imagine Film Co. The purchase received approval from the Time Warner board on 17 December 2009. At the end of the $126.5 million deal, Turner held 92% in NDTV Imagine Ltd. while 3.2% was retained by NDTV Networks and the remaining 4.8% was held by its chief executive officer Sameer Nair and other Imagine employees.

NDTV announced on 24 February 2010 that it received all the regulatory approvals and the transaction had been concluded on 23 February by transfer of shares, amounting to 85.68 per cent of NDTV Imagine Ltd, by NDTV Networks Plc to Turner Asia Pacific Ventures. The three channels were under Turner General Entertainment Networks, a holding company. The 'NDTV' brand was dropped and the channels labelled Imagine TV, Lumiere Movies and Imagine Showbiz.

The channel shut down, along with TCM India, on 5 July 2012. No DTH service or cable operator is broadcasting this channel.
