= Pogo (TV channel) =

Indian television channel

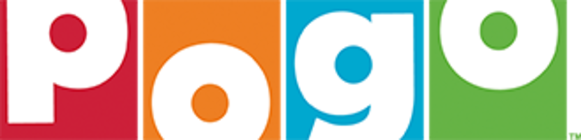
- Country: India
- Broadcast area: South Asia
- Headquarters: Mumbai, Maharashtra, India

Programming
- Languages: Hindi; English (Only GTPL); Tamil; Telugu; Kannada; Malayalam; Marathi
- Picture format: 16:9 partially letterboxed 576i SDTV

Ownership
- Owner: Warner Bros. Discovery India(Skydance Asia-Pacific, Middle East, and North Africa)
- Parent: Cartoon Network
- Sister channels: See List of channels owned by Warner Bros. Discovery India

History
- Launched: 1 January 2004; 22 years ago

Links
- Website: Pogo TV

Availability - Available on all major Indian DTH & Cables.

Terrestrial
- DVB-T2 (India): Check local frequencies

Streaming media
- Jio TV (India): Live TV
- Tata Play (India): Live TV

Pogo is an Indian pay television channel owned and operated by Skydance under Warner Bros. Discovery India. It is a sister channel of Cartoon Network India. It was launched on 1 January 2004. It broadcasts both animated and live action programming.

== Broadcast ==
In India, Sri Lanka and the Maldives, Pogo is available as a 24-hour channel. A time-based block version is shown in Nepal and Bhutan.

Pogo is available as a block in Bangladesh and Pakistan on Cartoon Network.

In Thailand Pogo is available as a block on Family Channel 13.

== History ==
=== 2004–2010 ===
The first logo, used from 2004 to 2016.

Pogo was officially launched on 1 January 2004 in English, Hindi, Tamil by Turner International India. After its launch, the channel primarily broadcast programming from Cartoon Network and Boomerang such as Tweenies, Beakman's World, Looney Tunes, and Scooby-Doo.

The channel aired Wallace & Gromit, Mr. Bean: The Animated Series, Lois & Clark: The New Adventures of Superman, and Walking with Dinosaurs. during its starting days.

In 2004, the channel launched Takeshi's Castle and premiered the Harry Potter movies.

On January 2005, the channel celebrated its 2nd anniversary by featuring a special programming franchise Ek Se Bhale Do that included double episodes of the most popular shows and blockbuster movies shown on the channel at that time. On 2 January 2005, the channel launched a new initiative called POGO Funtakshari.

On 1 March 2005, Pogo had Takeshi's Castle dubbed over with commentary from Bollywood personality and anchor, Jaaved Jaaferi.

On 6 June 2005, the channel premiered Shaktimaan.The channel became 2nd most viewed channel in ratings after its sister channel Cartoon Network which was on 1st.

The channel launched its Tiny TV block featuring preschool shows.

=== 2010–2013 ===
In 2010, Pogo began focusing more on live action programming than animated series.

In June 2010, the channel premiered Kumbh Karan, and relaunched its preschool featuring block Tiny TV.

In 2011, Pogo began to compete with its sister channel Cartoon Network in ratings which was leading in viewership at that time. The channel began airing shows such as Batman, The Powerpuff Girls, and more. Pogo acquired the rights of Chhota Bheem and subsequently began airing the show, which became hugely successful in India.

In 2012, Pogo became leading kids channel in India by surpassing its sister channel Cartoon Network in ratings and enjoyed to be the No. 1 kids channel in India. Chhota Bheem proven to be huge success for Pogo. The channel started airing more local shows including Chhota Bheem.

In February 2013, the Government of Bangladesh banned the broadcast of Pogo in the country, as it was accused of broadcasting there without authorisation.

On 6 June 2013, the channel premiered Krish, Trish and Baltiboy.

=== 2014–2017 ===
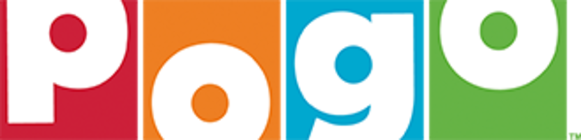
A variation of Pogo's current logo, used as of 7 November 2016.

In 2014, the channel celebrated its 10th anniversary.In January 2014, the channel premiered Obbochama-Kun and premiered Chhota Bheem - Neeli Pahaadi Movie on 26 January.

In 2015, the channel was launched in Thailand as a block on Family Channel 13.

On 19 December 2015, the channel premiered Wabbit.

In January 2016, Pogo premiered Yokai Watch on 11 January and Tashi on 23 January.

In 2017, Pogo rebranded with a new logo and look and the channel began classic shows from Hanna-Barbera, such as Tom and Jerry and Scooby-Doo. Grizzy & the Lemmings started to air on the channel on 2 January, Oddbods on 9 January and Andy Pirki on 3 December.

=== 2018–2021 ===
From 2018 to 2020, the channel started to shift its focus more on broadcasting mostly Indian animated series Chhota Bheem, Mighty Raju, Tik Tak Tail, etc. and hence stopped some of the international shows. In 2021, Pogo stopped all international shows altogether and only aired Indian animation, like Chhota Bheem, Dabangg, Roll No 21, Lambuji Tinguji and Bandbudh Aur Budbak.

Pogo TV became the third most watched kids channel across all genres with TRP in December 2020.

Pogo aired an animated movie Shaktimaan New TV Special on 14 November 2021. A Telugu-language audio track was added again to Pogo replacing the English-language audio track on 30 November 2021.

=== 2022–present ===
In 2022, Pogo resumed airing international shows such as Grizzy & the Lemmings, Mr. Bean: The Animated Series and Yo-kai Watch.

On 22 August 2022, Ekans – Snakes Awake, an original animated series of Cartoon Network (India) was shifted on Pogo TV.

On 4 September 2022, the channel premiered its special episode titled Ekans: Origin Story. The channel also launched an original movie of that series titled Ekans: The Mystery Of Three Gems on 9 October 2022, at 12:30 PM IST. The theatrical film of that series titled Ekans – Hero Ek Villain Anek was launched on the channel on 16 October 2022.

On 3 December 2022, Pogo launched Dennis the Menace and Gnasher.

Following the Warner Bros. Discovery India merger in mid-July 2022 (which made competitor Discovery Kids a sister network to both Pogo and Cartoon Network), on 24 December 2022, Little Singham was moved from Discovery Kids to Pogo.

On 1 March 2023, the channel launched a mini-series New Big Picture featuring Chhota Bheem.

In April 2023, the channel celebrated the 15th anniversary of Chhota Bheem with back-to-back episodes and movies.

On 15 August 2023, the channel celebrated the 6th anniversary of Little Singham and premiered Baby Little Singham on the same day.

On 21 October 2023, the channel, along with its sister channel Cartoon Network, premiered the first-ever localised version of Tom and Jerry, animated by two animation studios based in India and Singapore.

== See also ==
- Cartoon Network HD+
- Discovery Kids
