= JioTV =

Indian television streaming service

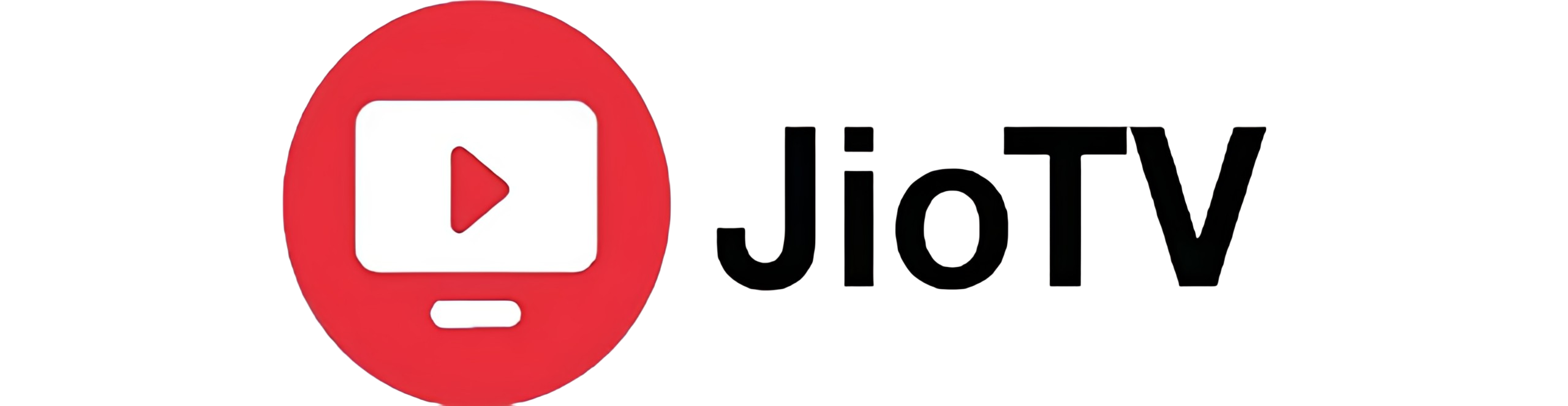
- Company type: Digital distribution
- Website type: Streaming television
- Available in: English; Hindi; Punjabi; Bhojpuri; Tamil; Telugu; Malayalam; Kannada; Marathi; Bengali; Gujarati
- Headquarters: Mumbai, India
- Area served: India
- Owner: Jio Platforms
- Founder: Mukesh Ambani
- Industry: Streaming; IPTV; Entertainment
- Products: Streaming media; Digital distribution
- Services: IPTV
- Website: JioTV
- Commercial: Yes
- Registration: Required
- Launched: 4 May 2016; 10 years ago

JioTV is an Indian streaming television service exclusively on Jio useres owned by Jio Platforms, a subsidiary of Reliance Industries. JioTV offers more than 1000 live channels with 7 days of catch up content, as per the website.

== History ==
JioTV was launched in 2016, from the digital arm of LYF (Jio), LYF Digital Convergence Limited. JioTV, an streaming television service offering LIVE TV and Catch Up Content to end consumers on their mobile phones, tablets, laptops, desktops, entertainment boxes and connected TVs.

JioTV web version was launched in December 2017 but it was taken down after two days because of some technical litigation issues.

As per the FAQs page on website, Jio TV on web allows for content discovery only and the streaming is available only on mobile devices through the app.

== Content partners ==
JioTV has partnered with different broadcasting companies such as ABP Group, Culver Max, NDTV, Sun TV Network, The Times Group, Living Media, Viacom18, Warner Bros. Discovery India and Essel Group. to provide content in different categories such as Business, Devotional, Education, Entertainment, Infotainment, Kids, News and Sports. JioTV has 17 'Jio Darshan' channels which telecast proceedings from a few Indian temples

32 government education channels on JioTV are hosted by the Ministry of Human Resources Development under Swayam Prabha.

In June 2020, JioTV tied up with the Assam government to host educational channel "Gyan Brikshya". In July 2020, JioTV has partnered with Manipur, Maharashtra, Haryana and Telangana state governments to telecast education channels for e-classes.

In December 2022, JioTV introduced Games and Music as part of its super-app experience. It also provides multi-audio and subtitle support across its live sports events.

In February 2023, KC Global Media launched Animax channel on JioTV.

== Strategic partnerships ==
Nov 2020 - Partnered with Rewind Network to distribute HITS content through JioTV platform

== Viewership ==
JioTV recorded a 84 million unique visitors in March 2020, an increase from 74 million unique visitors in March of the previous year. The company is owned by Jio Platforms, the digital service business of Reliance Industries.

According to a Kalagato report on OTT space, in 2018, JioTV saw around 18% of active users after Disney+ Hotstar which has 40% active users. In terms of national reach, Hotstar and JioTV both had 30% and 24% respectively market share.

JioTV recorded 74.5 million unique visitors in March 2019, which was an increase from 31.2 million unique visitors in March of the previous year.

Jio has over 1000+ Channels List that users can watch and enjoy.

== See also ==
- JioHotstar – paid OTT service and Android / iOS application
- JioSaavn – paid Music streaming service and Android / iOS mobile application
