= List of animated television series of 2015 =

This is a list of animated television series first aired in 2015.

Animated television series to air first in 2015
Title	Seasons	Episodes	Country	Year	Original channel	Technique
2 Nuts and a Richard!	2	38	Canada	2015–17	Télétoon la nuit	Flash
ABC Galaxy	1	26	United States	2015	BabyFirst	Flash
The Adventures of Annie & Ben	2	51	India	2015–18	YouTube	Flash
The Adventures of OG Sherlock Kush	2	20	United States	2015–16	FXX, YouTube	Flash
The Adventures of Puss in Boots	6	78	United States	2015–18	Netflix	CGI
Agi Bagi	3	52	Poland	2015	TVP ABC	CGI
Alamat	2	12	Philippines	2015–16	GMA Network	Flash/CGI
Alvinnn!!! and the Chipmunks	5	130	France, United States	2015–23	M6 (France), Nickelodeon (US)	CGI
Amouna Al Mazyouna	3	153	United Arab Emirates	2015–19	Majid Kids TV, Al Emarat TV	Flash
Los Artistonautas	1	9	Uruguay	2015	TNU	Flash
Astro Não Mia	1	13	Brazil	2015	TV Rá-Tim-Bum	CGI
BabyRiki	6	266	Russia	2015–present	YouTube, Carousel	CGI
Badaui Geumdongi	1	26	South Korea	2015	MBC TV	Traditional
Bandbudh Aur Budbak		156	India	2015–17	ZeeQ	Flash
Be Cool, Scooby-Doo!	2	52	United States	2015–18	Cartoon Network (episodes 1–20), Boomerang (episodes 21–26, 42–52), Boomerang SVOD (episodes 27–41)	Traditional
Be-Be-Bears	10	244	Russia	2015–present	Carousel	CGI
Beast Keeper	1	52	Italy	2015	Disney XD	Flash
Blazing Team: Masters of Yo Kwon Do	2	42	China, United States	2015–17	Discovery Family (US), iQiyi (China)	Flash
Bob the Builder (2015)	3	130	United Kingdom	2015–18	Channel 5	CGI
Bottersnikes & Gumbles	1	52	Australia, United Kingdom	2015–16	7TWO (Australia), CBBC (UK)	CGI
Captain Flinn and the Pirate Dinosaurs	1	52	Australia	2015–19	GO!	Flash
Care Bears & Cousins	2	12	United States	2015–16	Netflix	CGI
Cat & Keet	6	181	India	2015–present	Hungama TV	Flash
Chamki ki Duniya	1	52	India	2015–16	Pogo	Flash
El Chapulín Colorado	5	74	Mexico	2015–17	Canal 5	Flash
Chirp	1	52	Canada	2015–16	CBC Television	Flash
Clangers	3	104	United Kingdom	2015–20	CBeebies	Stop motion
Cleo	2	78	Spain	2015	Televisión Canaria; Clan	Flash
Coconut the Little Dragon	2	104	Germany	2015–20	KiKa	CGI
Los Creadores	3	40	Argentina	2015–17	Telefe	CGI/Live action
Cupid's Chocolate	2	30	China	2015–18	Tencent Video iQIYI; Bilibili; Youku; Sohu; Mango TV	
Da Jammies	1	13	United States; Canada	2015	Netflix	CGI
Danger Mouse (2015)	2	104	United Kingdom, Ireland, Canada (2018–19)	2015–19	CBBC	Toon Boom Harmony
Dawn of the Croods	4	52	United States	2015–17	Netflix	Traditional, Toon Boom Harmony (Three Episodes)
The Day Henry Met?	4	104	Ireland	2015–20	RTÉjr	Flash
DC Super Hero Girls	5	112	United States	2015–18	YouTube	Traditional, Flash (season 5)
The Deep	4	65	Australia; Canada; France (seasons 1–3); Singapore (season 4); United Kingdom (season 4)	2015–22	WildBrainTV; 7two CBBC	CGI
The Defenders	1	8	Russia	2015	Moolt	CGI
Descendants: Wicked World	2	33	United States	2015–17	Disney Channel	CGI
Dino Aventuras	2	52	Brazil	2015–18	Disney Channel, Disney Junior	CGI
Dinotrux	8	78	United States	2015–18	Netflix	CGI
Doi Degeaba	12	243	Romania	2015–present	YouTube	Flash
Don Quijote de la Láctea	1	13	Colombia	2015	Señal Colombia	
Doodleboo	1	52	France	2015	Canal+ Family	CGI/Live action
Eena Meena Deeka			India	2015–17	Hungama TV	Flash
Egyxos	1	26	Italy	2015	Super!	Flash/Traditional
Endangered Species	1	26	Canada	2015	Teletoon	CGI
Exchange Student Zero	1	13	Australia	2015	Cartoon Network	Flash
F Is for Family	5	44	United States, France, Canada	2015–21	Netflix	Flash
Family Story	1	150	South Korea	2015	KBS1	
Fighter of the Destiny	5	61	China	2015–20	Tencent Video, Bilibili	Traditional
Flip Flap			Indonesia	2015	SCTV	CGI
Four and a Half Friends	1	26	Germany, Spain	2015	Super3 (Spain), KiKa (Germany)	Flash
Fox Spirit Matchmaker	12	157	China	2015–present	Tencent Video, Bilibili	Traditional
Fresh Beat Band of Spies	1	20	Canada, United States	2015–16	Nickelodeon, Nick Jr.	Flash
Full Moon Factory	1	26	South Korea	2015	MBC	Flash
Galaxy Kids	2	52	South Korea	2015–17	KBS1	Stop motion
Gecko's Garage			United Kingdom	2015–present	YouTube	CGI
Get Blake!	1	26	France	2015	Nickelodeon; Gulli; Nicktoons	Flash
Go Jetters	3	154	United Kingdom	2015–20	CBeebies	CGI
Goldie & Bear	2	45	United States	2015–18	Disney Junior	CGI
Gopal Bhar	1	1,134	India	2015–present	Sony Aath	Flash/Traditional
Guardians of the Galaxy	3	79	United States	2015–19	Disney XD	Traditional
H_{2}O: Mermaid Adventures	2	26	Australia, Canada, France	2015	Netflix	Flash
Hairy Legs	1	52	Australia, Singapore	2015	7TWO, ABC3	Flash
Harvey Beaks	2	52	United States	2015–17	Nickelodeon (2015–16), Nicktoons (2017)	Traditional
Havananimal			Ireland	2015	RTÉjr	Flash
Heartland Hubby	1	10	Singapore	2015	Channel 5	Flash
Heidi	2	65	Australia, Belgium, France, Germany	2015–20	TF1	CGI
Homeless	1	13	Chile	2015	La Red	
Horaci the Inuit	2	70	Spain	2015–19	Super3	Flash
Hum Chik Bum			India	2015–17	Hungama TV	Flash
If You Give a Mouse a Cookie	2	53	Canada; United States	2015–21	Amazon Prime Video; Knowledge Kids	Flash
Insectibles	1	52	Germany, Malaysia, Singapore	2015	Discovery Kids, KiKa	CGI
Inspector Gadget (2015)	4	52	Canada	2015–18	Teletoon (seasons 1–2), Family Channel (seasons 3–4)	CGI
Jing-Ju Cats	4	190	China	2015–20		
JingleKids		15	Russia	2015–20	YouTube	CGI
Jungle Survival	2	78	South Korea	2015–18	EBS1	CGI
Juninho Play e Família	1	12	Brazil	2015	YouTube	
Justice League: Gods and Monsters Chronicles	1	3	United States	2015	YouTube	Traditional
K3	1	52	Belgium, France	2015–16	M6	Traditional
Kid-E-Cats	5	260	Russia	2015–present	Nickelodeon, STS	Flash
The Kids from Seagull Street	2	52	Germany	2015–17	KiKa	Flash
Kiwi & Strit	3	65	Denmark	2015	SVT Barnkanalen	CGI
Kuu Kuu Harajuku	3	78	Australia, Canada, Malaysia, United States	2015–19	Eleven	Flash
The Legend of Lucky Pie	1	5	China	2015–18		Traditional/Flash
Lego Elves	1	3	Denmark	2015–16	Disney Channel	Flash
Lego Elves (webisodes)	1	33	Denmark	2015–17	YouTube	
Lego Star Wars: Droid Tales	1	5	United States	2015	Disney XD	CGI
Leo the Wildlife Ranger	4	126	Singapore	2015–present	Okto	CGI
Like, Share, Die	1	16	United States	2015	Fusion TV	Flash
Lili & Lola	3	15	Canada	2015–17	Oznoz	Flash
Little Charmers	2	57	Canada	2015–17	Nickelodeon, Treehouse TV	CGI
The Little Stone Dodo	2	52	South Korea	2015–19	MBC TV	Flash
Long Live the Royals	1	4	United States	2015	Cartoon Network	Traditional
The Long Long Holiday	1	10	France	2015	France 3	CGI/Traditional
Lucas & Emily	2	104	France	2015	France 5	
Magic Lantern	1	104	Russia	2015–16	Moolt in Cinema, Moolt	CGI
Major Lazer	1	11	United States	2015	FXX	Traditional
Messy Goes to OKIDO	3	104	United Kingdom	2015–23	CBeebies	CGI
Miffy's Adventures Big and Small	3	104	Netherlands, United Kingdom	2015–19	KRO (Netherlands), Tiny Pop (UK)	CGI
Mighty Raju			India	2015–19	Pogo	
Mika's Diary	3	78	Brazil	2015	Disney Channel	Flash
Miles from Tomorrowland	3	75	United States	2015–18	Disney Junior	CGI
Mini Ninjas	2	104	France	2015–19	TF1	
Miraculous: Tales of Ladybug & Cat Noir	6	157	France; Italy; Japan; South Korea; Brazil; India	2015–present	TF1 (TFOU); TFX (TFOU); EBS1 (season 1); Disney Channel EMEA (season 2–present); Super! (seasons 2–5); Gloob (season 3–present); Télé-Québec (season 6–present)	CGI
The Mojicons	2	26	Russia	2015–16	STS	CGI
Molang	6	321	France	2015–22	Canal+ Family, Piwi+, TF1	Flash
Moonbeam City	1	10	Canada, United States	2015	Comedy Central	Flash
The Mr. Peabody & Sherman Show	4	52	United States	2015–17	Netflix	Flash
Mutant Busters	1	52	Spain	2015	Neox Kidz	CGI
Nature Cat	5	98	Canada, United States	2015–25	PBS Kids	Flash (seasons 1–3), Toon Boom (seasons 4–5)
Nelly & Nora	1	52	Ireland	2015	RTÉjr	Flash
The New Adventures of Figaro Pho	1	39	Australia	2015–16	ABC3	CGI
New Looney Tunes	3	156	United States	2015–20	Cartoon Network, Boomerang, Boomerang SVOD	Traditional
Nexo Knights	4	40	Canada, Denmark	2015–17	Cartoon Network	CGI
Nichtlustig – Die Serie	1	6	Germany	2015–18		
Night Sweats	1	26	Canada	2015	Adult Swim	Flash/Traditional/CGI/Live action
Nina's World	2	52	Canada, United States	2015–18	Sprout	Flash
Paper Port	2	52	Argentina, Brazil, Chile, Colombia	2015	Pakapaka, Gloob, TVN, Señal Colombia	Stop motion
Paper Tales	2	78	Russia	2015–16	Moolt, Carousel	CGI
Pat a Pat Como	1	18	South Korea	2015	SBS	CGI
Pickle and Peanut	2	42	United States	2015–18	Disney XD	Flash
Pig Goat Banana Cricket	2	40	United States	2015–18	Nickelodeon (2015–16), Nicktoons (2016–18)	Flash, Traditional (Ánima Estudios episodes)
Pirate Express	1	26	Australia, Canada	2015	Teletoon (Canada), GO! (Australia)	Flash
PJ Masks	6	151	France; United Kingdom; Canada	2015–2024	Disney Channel/Disney Junior; France 5	CGI
Popples	3	26	France, United States, Belgium	2015–16	Netflix	CGI
Princess Fragrant	1	104	China	2015		CGI
Princess Pring	2	39	South Korea	2015–18	KBS1, KBS2	CGI
Puffin Rock	2	78	Ireland	2015–present	RTÉjr	Flash
Pumpkin Reports	1	52	Spain; Malaysia; Italy	2015–16	Clan	CGI
Pyaar Mohabbat Happy Lucky	2	129	India	2015–17	ZeeQ	Flash
Robot Trains	2	84	South Korea	2015–19	SBS TV	CGI
Robin Hood: Mischief in Sherwood	4	208	France; Germany; Luxembourg (season 1); India (seasons 1–2); Italy (seasons 1, 3)	2015–24	TF1 (France)/Disney Channel (France, seasons 1–2); ZDF (Germany); DeA Kids (Italy, season 1)	CGI
Robotex	1	26	South Korea	2015–16	KBS2	Traditional/CGI
The Roy Files	1	15	Ireland	2015–16	CBBC	
Ruff-Ruff, Tweet and Dave	2	104	Canada, Singapore, United Kingdom, United States	2015–19	CBeebies (UK), Sprout (US)	CGI
School Shock	1	6	China	2015		Traditional
Scream Street	3	52	United Kingdom, Germany	2015–present	CBBC	Stop motion
The Shadownsters	1	104	Spain	2015	Ruutu+	CGI
Shimmer and Shine	4	86	United States, Canada (season 1)	2015–20	Nick Jr., Nick Jr. Channel	Flash (season 1), CGI (seasons 2–4)
Shiva	7	337	India	2015–present	Nickelodeon, Nickelodeon Sonic	CGI
Sick Bricks	1	40	United States	2015	YouTube	CGI
Silly Seasons	1	26	South Africa	2015–16	eToonz+	CGI
Sissi: The Young Empress	3	65	Italy	2015–20	Boing	
SOS Fairy Manu	4	78	Brazil	2015–19	Gloob	Flash
The Stanley Dynamic	2	52	Canada	2015–17	YTV	Flash/Live action
Star Darlings	1	12	United States	2015–16	YouTube	CGI
Star vs. the Forces of Evil	4	77	United States	2015–19	Disney Channel; Disney XD	Flash (season 1); Traditional (seasons 2–4)
Sunny Bunnies	10	256	Belarus; Poland; United Kingdom	2015–present	YouTube	CGI
SuperMansion	3	41	United States	2015–19	Crackle	Stop motion
Supernoobs	2	104	Canada	2015–19	Teletoon; Cartoon Network (season 1); Family Channel (season 2); Hulu (season 2)	Flash
O (Sur)real Mundo de Any Malu	5	111	Brazil	2015–present	YouTube	Flash
Sydney Sailboat; Bubble Bath Bay	2	52	Australia	2015	ABC Kids	CGI
Systraat	1	13	South Africa	2015–16	YouTube	
Tass and Four Character Idioms	1	52	South Korea	2015–16	MBC TV	Flash
Thunderbirds Are Go	3	78	New Zealand	2015–20	TVNZ	CGI
Thomas Edison's Secret Lab	1	52	United States	2015	PBS Kids, Universal Kids	Flash
Tina & Tony	2	104	Russia	2015–21	Moolt in Cinema, Moolt	CGI
Total Drama Presents: The Ridonculous Race	1	26	Canada	2015	Cartoon Network	Flash
Transformers: Robots in Disguise	3	71	United States, Japan	2015–17	Cartoon Network	CGI/Traditional
Tronquinho e Pão de Queijo	1	26	Brazil	2015	Gloob	Flash
Turning Mecard	1	52	South Korea	2015–16	KBS2	Traditional
Twirlywoos		50	United Kingdom	2015–17	CBeebies	Stop motion/Live action
Two More Eggs	3	90	United States	2015–17	YouTube, Disney XD	Flash
The Unparalleled Black & White	3	36	China	2015–21	Bilibili	
Vinicius e Tom – Divertidos por Natureza	1	32	Brazil	2015	Cartoon Network	
Vixen	2	12	United States	2015–16	CW Seed	Traditional
We Bare Bears	4	140	United States	2015–19	Cartoon Network	Traditional
Welcome to Bric-a-Broc	1	39	France	2015	Canal+ Family	
Whisker Haven	3	31	United States	2015–17	Disney Junior	Flash
Wishenpoof!	2	39	Canada, United States	2015–19	Amazon Prime Video	CGI
Wissper	2	104	Germany, Ireland, United Kingdom	2015–19	Channel 5 (UK), KiKa (Germany)	CGI
Wooparoo Adventure	1	13	South Korea	2015	Anione	
Wussywat the Clumsy Cat	1	52	Canada, United Kingdom	2015–18	CBeebies	Flash
YaYa & Zouk	2	146	Canada	2015–18	Radio-Canada	Flash
Year Hare Affair	5	59	China	2015–present		
Zip Zip	2	104	France	2015–20	France 3	Flash
Zombiedumb	3	162	South Korea	2015–23	KBS1	CGI
Zoom the White Dolphin	2	104	France	2015	TF1	CGI
Zorro: The Chronicles	1	26	France	2015–16	France 3	CGI
Zupt! com o Senninha	1	13	Brazil	2015	Discovery Kids	

== See also ==
- List of animated feature films of 2015 – Lists animation films released in 2015
- List of Japanese anime television series of 2015 – Lists Japanese anime television shows premiered in 2015
