= A.U =

Chinese media franchise

A.U (阿U or 阿优) is a Chinese media franchise comprising comedy manhua, cartoons and games that was introduced in 2009. It is a brand owned by Hangzhou AU Culture & Technologies Co., Ltd. It centers on a boy of the same name and his friends.

== Characters ==
=== Main characters ===
- A.U (阿U) - A red-haired boy who is curious, naughty, and loving.
- Pangzai (胖仔) - A fat boy who loves to eat.
- Amei (阿美) - A girl who is pretty and smart.
- Nanrenpo (男人婆) - A tomboy who is straightforward.

=== Other characters ===
- Mr. Jia (甲老师) - Head teacher of A.U's class.

=== Main characters (rabbits) added after fifth season ===
- Tiaotiao (跳跳) - An active and dynamic rabbit.
- Tufei (兔菲) - The head of three rabbits.
- Shuai'er (甩耳) - An lazy rabbit with wagging ears.

== Comics and animation ==
A.U comic books were first published by Zhejiang Juvenile and Children's Publishing House in 2011, and as of 2013 over 100 million copies were sold. The first A.U animated series premiered on China Central Television in August 2012 and A.U cartoons have since become popular. In 2014, the fifth season, A.U: Amazing Carrot (阿U之神奇萝卜), introduced rabbit characters to the show.

In May 4, 2015, the A.U animated series premiered in India on ZeeQ.

== Merchandising and games ==
There is an A.U clothing brand for children with the chief designer being Yves Castaldi. Other branded products include snacks, footwear, and wallpaper. Electronic educational devices for young children including a smart rabbit-like robot called A.U Rabbit for families have also been released. There are A.U games on the Apple App Store and the A.U electronic devices. Brand awareness for A.U among primary school students had reached 63.3%.

== Theme park ==
A theme park called A.U Cartoon Island (阿U国际卡通岛) in Xianghu Lake in Hangzhou was planned and would feature digital interactivity.
