= List of Bandbudh Aur Budbak episodes =

Bandbudh Aur Budbak is an Indian animated television series that originally aired on ZeeQ from 2015 to 2017. It has 156 episodes. This series is digitally available on ZEE5.

== Episodes ==
No.	Title
1	"Yoga Se Hoga"
A Yoga teacher named Yogiraj with Rathi sir comes to Apna School to teach the students yoga. Badrinath and Budhdeb perform the asanas easily due to receiving murga punishment regularly. Seeing them, Yogiraj tells both of them to teach yoga to the other students and goes with Rathi. However, Budh & Badri make the students do funny asanas. The episode ends with the ‘murga’ punishment given by Dubey to Badri and Budh for doing such asanas.
2	"Budhu Bana Budhimaan"
Badrinath and Budhdeb stop under a mango tree on the way to school. They try to pluck some mangoes from the tree. After failing repeatedly at this, Badri throws a brick at the mangoes, but it ricochets on a branch and hits Budhdeb's head and turns him into a genius student. When they arrive at school, he answers all the questions asked by Dubey. Intrigued, he takes Budhdeb to principal Rathi's office. When Rathi hears some of the things he says such as his past, him and the students start to call Budhdeb 'guru'. Later, Badri again throws a stone that hits Budhdeb's head and he reverts from his genius abilities.
3	"Jaadugar Kaala Kaboola"
The evil magician Kaala Kaboola, who in reality is a thief, comes to Apna School to perform magic tricks to entertain the students and teachers. Rathi sends Badrinath and Budhdeb to assist him in his tracks. When he performs a magic trick with ulterior motives and removes everything from everyone's pockets, the two boys must find a plan to stop the magician for good.
4	"Birthday Party"
Karan's birthday comes near, and he plans to celebrate it in the school canteen. He invites everyone except Badri and Budh. They ask him, but he refuses. They complain to Dubey, and he tells Karan to invite them too. So he is forced to invite them. He tells them to serve cold drinks and snacks to others as helpers. To teach Jeeva a lesson, Badri and Budh take two glasses and mix tablets in them. Meanwhile, Rathi comes and tells them to end the party due to overtime. They give him a glass of drink mixed with tablets and he runs. The party becomes pleasant. Badrinath and Budhdeb drink the second glass and run to the toilets.
5	"Soch Samajh Ke Bol"
Badrinath discovers that whatever he speaks becomes true. He becomes happy and makes up his mind to use this power to his benefit and advantage. Mistakenly, he speaks words that make him foolish. Dubey gives him murga punishment. But Budh, with the help of Gyan, helps Badri to return to normal. He speaks words that make Budh abnormal and he also becomes a fool.
6	"Safai Abhiyan"
Apna School organizes a campaign for school cleanliness with a prize for the winner. Badrinath and Budhdeb struggle to win first prize, but they play pranks and tricks instead of cleaning. Dubey notices and understands their plan. Therefore, as a punishment, Dubey gives them the task of cleaning the entire school. But Rathi while coming to the school with his car mistakenly realises that no one except Budh and Badri were cleaning the school after seeing them cleaning the school over a revenge watch by Dubey Sir and others. So they get rewarded with a trophy instead, but later assumed it as waste and threw it in the garbage while returning from school.
7	"Alien"
Badri and Budh ask Gyan questions about aliens which he explains clearly. They think that Gyan is an alien because only an alien could answer such hard questions, so they try to prove it. They misunderstood that Gyan has an aliens' remote through which he contacts aliens. They go to the principal to tell him Gyan's nature (that he's alien). Gyan clarifies that his remote is a music player that was given to him by his father. Gyan removes their doubts. But the principal punishes Badri and Budh for their false news and Gyan for bringing the music player to school. In this way, Gyan is punished for the first time.
8	"Kala Shaala"
All students go to the painting room and start drawing images. Badri and Budh make a funny picture of Jeeva in which he looks likes a donkey and frog. Jeeva pushes them, but they fall on colours, which makes an imprint on canvas. Bindiya realizes that Budh and Badri have artistic talents. She encourages their talent and makes them participate in an art competition. They draw a bad image, which is sent to the competition without review. Bindiya tells the principal that the school would win a trophy. They won the trophy, which pleased the principal. But Dubey desired to see the painting. The Principal asks Badri and Budh to explain what painting is, but they fail to explain. The principal becomes furious and throws the trophy on the floor.
9	"Nakal Ki Akkal"
Budh & Badri go to school with no preparation for their exams. They feel sure that they will fail, but to get the help they make chits for exams. Dubey sleeps during the exam in the exam hall, keeping a book on his face. When Dubeyji sleeps away during the exam, both of them pass chits to each other to write their full papers. Bindiya sees Dubey sleeping and goes to Rathi for his complaint. Badri demands an extra sheet for the exam upon which Dubeyji wakes and wonders. Rathi sees that Dubey is not sleeping and goes off. The next day, the result is announced in which Gyan stands first but Badri and Budh fail because they wrote Mathematics in the paper of Chemistry.
10	"Naughty 4"
Budh and Badri go to the principal's office. They were in the way and the sisters Maira and Saira kicked their football which falls on the trophy cupboard in the principal office. They retrieved their football but accidentally trophies fell and broke apart. Badri & Budh reached there but Maira and Saira had left. The principal came and accused them of doing it and gave them punishment to remain 2 hours more in school after the school day's end. Maira & Saira became their friends and they form a new group named "Naughty 4". But in class, the sisters refused to be members of the group.
11	"Ek Garden Do Mali"
Badrinath and Budhdeb went to school, but like always had not finished their homework. Budh went to Maira to take his notebook to copy homework, but she demands flowers from the school's garden. There they see Patel suffering from fever and decided to help him so that they should not be punished for not doing homework. A squirrel comes and destroys the garden. The principal then punished them.
12	"Birthday Cake"
Gyan tells Badrinath and Budhdeb to bring a cake for celebrating the birthday of Bindiya ma'am. The next day they purchased a cake, but Jeeva caused the cake to drop to the ground and spoil when they were in the way. They decide to give a paper cake instead, as they have no more money. Jeeva tells the principal about the celebration. When the cake is opened the principal came, but after seeing the paper cake, he went happily. In this way, the entire class was saved from punishment.
13	"Kalam Ka Kamaal"
When Badrinath and Budhdeb were going to school, they found a pen. Budh used it to do Badri's homework. Dubey was near to punish Badri for using a pen but at the same time, the principal came and allowed the use of the pen for homework. Everyone tries Badri's pen except the triplets. The following day, everyone had a pen. Badri accepts Karan's challenge for participating in the pen race. Karan loses. To punish him, he hides his gel pen in Badri's bag. Karan succeeds. Badri gets revenge by using another gel pen to destroy the principal's grandfather's photo. But Gyan is punished for this act because of having a gel pen.
14	"Nanha Dost"
Badrinath and Budhdeb were talking while walking to school. On the way, they saw a cute white mouse and saved it from a crow's attack. They named it "Puchku" and took it with them to class. In school, it makes everyone frightened. Patel tries to kill it but they save it again. Puchku then finds another white mouse which was his friend and leaves Badrinath and Budhdeb.
15	"Chor Ki Zubaan Kaali"
Badrinath and Budhdeb make a plan to eat all the students' lunches. However, when they approach the bags, the lunch boxes are empty. Jeeva saw them and reported to Dubey, who punished them. They made another plan to catch the lunch eater. To their surprise, it was all done by Dubey himself.
16	"Gyan Ki Jaasusi"
Badrinath and Budhdeb were not ready for exams. They saw Patel and Gyan giving each other money and a packet of papers. They followed Gyan and took the packet out and copied all questions. They prepared just their answers. But during the exam, all questions were different, they told the whole matter to Dubey and discovered that those were the previous year's question papers. At last, they were given murga punishment.
17	"Do Yaar Kalakaar"
The principal tells the students that a theatre group with a director is coming to Apna School. They will choose some students to act as a hero or heroine for the new play. On the noticeboard, Badrinath and Budhdeb change the audition dates so that no one will be selected except them. On the day, they met the director, commenced their audition, and were selected. But Dubey knows their subterfuge of changing dates and punishes them.
18	"Dadi Maa Ke Nuskhe"
Budh pretends to be unconscious so that he and Badri can play the new game edition of Mega Robot. But Maira and Saira prescribe someone's sock to make him conscious, and Jeeva's sock is used. Bindiya tells all of them to take some useful prescriptions and tell others. Badrinath and Budhdeb didn't get prescriptions. Jeeva asks them for a prescription that can reduce as well as pacify the anger of Dubey Ji. They give him a mixture made of four eggs, red chilli powder, garlic, ginger, and neem leaves. The mixture is given to Dubey to eat, but he becomes angry after eating it and punishes Jeeva and his friends, the triplets.
19	"Trophy Chor"
Badrinath and Budhdeb wake up from sleeping. To their surprise, they realize that they fell asleep in class and now it is night. They also realize that they have been locked inside the school. They cry and shout for help but no one comes. They also try to pass over the gate but fail. They go to the principal's office and see a thief stealing a trophy, who tries to run away. But they make the thief fail, saving the trophy. In the morning, they sleep in class, for which Dubey punishes them.
20	"Paani Ka Bhoot"
Badrinath and Budhdeb go to drink water from the cooler but after seeing a long line return frustrated. Due to their thirst, they considered other students at the cooler. They make a plan that there is a ghost haunting the cooler, to frighten everyone. But students wish to meet the ghost and make a queue even longer than before.
21	"Angrezi Ka Aakraman"
Badrinath and Budhdeb go to school on their bicycle 'Rockit'. Badri challenges Budh to speak English in school the whole day. To make Budh lose, Badri sticks a paper with "I hate Hindi" written on it. The Hindi teacher reads it. Badri accuses Jeeva of sticking the paper on him. But because of Gyan, Saira, and Maira, Budh discovers the truth. During the Hindi period, the teacher punishes both of them due to speaking English during the Hindi period. Dubey passes nearby and becomes happy to see them as 'murga'.
22	"Gaana Bajana"
Teacher Bindiya informs the students about a music competition taking place in class the following day, with the winner to get a trophy. Everyone prepares. The competition is won by Gyan and Sabina as a team. But Badrinath and Budhdeb continue singing to win the trophy. Jeeva breaks their guitar and Maira and Saira mock their bad singing. But Gyan presents his trophy to them to stop them from further singing.
23	"Ye Dosti Hum Nichodenge"
It is Gyan's first day of school. Budh and Badri wish to befriend him so that they can make him do their homework and carry their bags from home to school. But Jeeva and the triplets make him their friend and use him for their works. Badri frees Gyan from Jeeva. But Gyan didn't accept Badri as a friend due to their dream of making him work for them.
24	"Churan Ka Chakkar"
In class, Dubey asks two questions to Badri and Budh which they answer correctly. The whole class wonders. Maira and Saira spread the news that Badrinath and Budhdeb have a powder that increased their intelligence. All students give them a treat and take that powder. But they fail the test. Dubey and students go to the principal. Badri and Budh explain that powder was medicinal for Budh's stomach ache and that answering the questions was a coincidence. In the morning, when the principal’s car was passing by, they had read the answers of the questions that Dubey had asked while using books to hide their faces.
25	"Mann Ki Baat"
While going to school, Badri and Budh find a red-coloured pair of sunglasses. With its help, anyone's mind could be read. Badri challenges Jeeva for a quiz competition which Badri wins. Bindiya takes Badri to the principal for wearing sunglasses in school. Rathi wears the glasses and reads everyone's mind. To their surprise, he knows the minds of Dubey and Bindiya that were full of complaints. In the end, Rathi breaks the sunglasses.
26	"Apna Sapna Funny Funny"
Teacher Dubey asks the students to tell him their dreams of becoming what in the future. Badri and Budh think for a long time, but fail to choose a profession. When Dubey asks, Gyan says that he wants to be a scientist. Jeeva to be a police inspector. Sabina to be a politician and Karan wants to be a businessman. But Badrinath and Budhdeb say that they want to be good human beings. Dubey gives them a toffee as a prize.
27	"Computer Ke Kitanu"
Badrinath and Budhdeb have a computer affected by viruses. They seek help from Gyan and, being a genius, he resolves the issue. To prove their intelligence, Badrinath and Budhdeb remove memory cards from all the computers. Everything goes wrong and they again seek help from Gyan. But Badri, Budh and Jeeva are punished by Rathi.
28	"Sacchai Ka Pedh"
Principal Rathi gives seeds to all students to grow and participate in a school competition. Badri and Budh don't know how to grow seeds. They add junk food, noodles, and buffalo dung to grow it. On the day, Rathi explains that Badrinath and Budhdeb grew cactus seed given by him and all other students grew other seeds that weren't given by him. Rathi announces Badrinath and Budhdeb as the winners.
29	"Do Bawarchi"
Principal Rathi wants 2 students to prepare a dish at the food festival. Dubey suggests Badri, Budh, and Jeeva to make the dish. Badrinath and Budhdeb make a portion of good food that is loved by all. The next day, they again make food, but everyone becomes mad after eating it as they've added too many red chillies and spices to the dish.
30	"Jo Hota Hai Acche Ke Liye Hota Hai"
Badrinath and Budhdeb believe that everything happens for a good reason. They make all students like Gyan, Jeeva, and Karan believe them by the happening incidents. When nothing remains in control, Mr Rathi suspends Dubey and brings a strict teacher named "Khadak Singh" (who is really just Rathi in disguise). All students request the principal to bring Dubey Sir back. The principal brings him back on the condition that they believe that not everything happens for good reason.
31	"Christmas Tree"
A competition is held at Apna School. Badrinath and Budhdeb also buy a Christmas tree to win the competition. But their tree is destroyed by an accident. They make plans to steal the trees of other students but to no avail. But they devise a solution to hang decorations on the school's big tree that everyone admires.
32	"Notebook Cover"
Budh & Badri see that Jeeva has decorated all of his books with glitter and stickers. They make up their minds to also cover their notebooks which would look more beautiful than Jeeva's books. But when they go to buy covers, they use their money to buy treats like cupcakes and ice-cream. They use newspapers to cover their books. Later, Rathi holds a quiz competition and that cover of newspapers helps Badri win.
33	"Project Newton"
Badri and Budh fail to make a science project given by Mr Rathi and Sir Dubey. They see other classmates' projects and make them fail. When teachers see the projects, they become upset and angry due to their dysfunction. But Badrinath and Budhdeb made a simple project named "Project Newton" and win the prize.
34	"Breaking News"
Badrinath finds a camera. Badri becomes the news reporter for the school and Budh acts as a cameraman. They start to record the events of the day happening at the school. They take interviews from Gyan, Patil, and Maira & Saira but feel bored. They made a video of Jeeva stealing the trophy from the principal office. They show it to the principal and he becomes happy from their good work of finding the thief.
35	"Gayi Bahas Pani Mein"
A debate competition is held at Apna School. Badrinath and Budhdeb make preparations to win the debate program. But they are selected for opposing teams; Dubey teams Badri and Karan in the A team, and Budh and Gyan in the B team. The A team wins as Budh loses the debate intentionally by favouring the mega robot game.
36	"School Bell"
To avoid several periods in school, Badrinath and Budhdeb steal the school bell. They place it in Mr Rathi's box which also contains the principal's wig. Everyone tries to find the bell but fails. In the end, the box is found in the corridor containing the bell, wig, and Budh's notebook that was used to hide the bell. In this way, they were caught and punished.
37	"Pachpan Mein Bachpan"
Yogiraj Ji comes to Apna School to hypnotize Badrinath and Budhdeb. First, he hypnotizes Jeeva but this hypnosis ends with the sound of Budh's clap. When he tries to hypnotize Badrinath and Budhdeb, the principal gets hypnotized. He acts like a child, calls himself 'Prince', and becomes the best friend of Badrinath and Budhdeb. By mistake, Budh breaks the trophy and its sound de-hypnotizes principal Rathi. They are punished for their deed.
38	"Ulta Pulta"
The principal announces that all students should do social work. Badrinath and Budhdeb fail to arrange books in the library. They make Gyan's homework false. They try to remove the black spot from the nose of the painting of Rathi's grandfather, but spoil it and are punished at the end.
39	"Ramleela"
All students rehearse for the show "Ramleela". Both Badrinath and Budhdeb annoy Jeeva. They skip school to escape from the rehearsals. Both of them forget their scripts, so they seek Gyan's help. Jeeva forces Gyan to deceive them by using false scripts, but then the play takes a turn and the whole show was spoilt. Everything ends with punishment to Badri and Budh.
40	"Kuda Bhojan"
Rathi sir bans unhealthy junk food from the school and orders all students to eat healthy food for their health. Badrinath and Budhdeb begin selling fast food and junk food secretly. Rathi and Dubey discover this work and catch them with Jeeva's assistance.
41	"Hansa To Phasa"
Patel takes laughing gas to school on the principal's instructions. When Badri discovers it, he opens it and starts laughing. Badri escapes and the principal punishes Budh for this act. Jeeva takes advantage of it and makes him an opponent of Badri. Badri opens the gas and escapes with Budh, but Jeeva and the triplets are punished by Rathi.
42	"Dubey Ji Ka Maunvrat"
Dubey's throat is affected by bacteria, giving him a sore throat, Yoginath gives him a herbal syrup and instructs him not to speak for hours. He tells Budh and Badri to serve Dubey as his voice and speak what Dubey orders. They both misuse this opportunity and get advantages like not studying and eating free from the canteen. Dubey gets frustrated and in the end, his throat heals.
43	"Shikshak Diwas"
On teacher's day, Badri and Budh were going to school and wished that there would be student's day too. Rathi selects Badrinath and Budhdeb as class teachers for one day. They use this opportunity for their own benefit and advantage. Jeeva gets angry about it. It ends up with Dubey and Jeeva in the toilet.
44	"Jhoot Bolna Paap Hai"
In the beginning, Gyan falls into a pothole. Badrinath and Budhdeb help him to stand. He tells them that it happened due to his lies. They don't believe it. Budh accepts Badri's challenge that he wouldn't tell lies in the school and would totally speak the truth. It causes many backfires for Budh.
45	"Masti Nahi Sasti"
Badrinath tells a story to his friend Budh about a boy who always cried wolf and deceived the villagers. They try to replicate the story to make everyone laugh and for playing pranks. They fool everyone twice, and because of it, no one trusts them further. The third time, they are caught up in trouble, but no one helps them. When they try to convince the class for a test on the next day, no one trusts them and prepares the test. Dubey takes the test and declares Badri and Budh heads of the class in the result.
46	"Jhingalala Tera Mooh Kala"
Badrinath and Budhdeb go to a storeroom and hear the voice of the kidnapper Jhingalala. They report it to Mr Rathi. They hear the kidnapper say that he would kidnap the fattest boy. Jeeva becomes frightened. The principal makes a trick to catch the kidnapper. But when the kidnapper is caught, they come to realize it was Patel listening to an old radio program about the infamous kidnapper Jhingalala in the storeroom wearing a mask.
47	"Do Bandar School Ke Andar"
Dubey tells the class about the 3 monkeys of Gandhi which were 'not doing, seeing or hearing evil'. Badrinath and Budhdeb try to make a new monkey and they also start a protest for this purpose. But Dubey makes a plan to end their protest. At last, they fail in their new monkey's creation.
48	"Khazane Ki Khoj"
In school, Badrinath and Budhdeb find a map of the school. They think it is a treasure map. All the other students join them in finding treasure. They went to the lab, and to find the treasure they broke all equipment and flasks in the lab. They even break the lab's walls. The principal arrives. Jeeva finds a trophy which makes the principal happy. The principal explains that the thief made the map for himself.
49	"Chashma Ka Karishma"
Jeeva steals Principal Rathi's eyeglasses. To teach Badrinath a lesson, he hides it in Badri's bag. The principal announces to find the spectacles that have been lost or stolen. On Bindiya's advice, the principal announces an award for the finder. Jeeva tries to take back the glasses from the bag for the sake of the reward. But Badri knows about the glasses and fights with Jeeva to get the reward.
50	"Kala Akshar Bhains Barabar"
When Principal Rathi is away from school, the students make a plan to play indoor games. Badrinath and Budhdeb challenge Jeeva to play outdoor games. After the outdoor games, Dubey and Gyan propose to them to play a game of scrabble. Badrinath and Budhdeb take the game to the next level with a twist.
51	"Baarish Lallantap"
Both friends Badrinath and Budhdeb fall into the nearby stream. Badrinath and Budhdeb enter the classroom fully drenched with water. Dubey asks everyone to show their homework to him. But Badri and Budh's books were wet. Meanwhile, a frog enters the classroom from the window and everyone in the class runs out frightened. Dubey jumps on the table. Finally, Badrinath and Budhdeb are rewarded for helping Dubey by keeping the frog away from him.
52	"Tod Mod Ke Jod"
Dubey gives Mr Rathi a statue of his grandfather and in return the principal promises to give him a scooter as a reward. On the other hand, all students were present in the lab. Badrinath and Budhdeb stick a skeleton to Jeeva's backside using super glue. To remove the skeleton, Jeeva gets help from Gyan. But he also sticks with him. Karan and the triplets also get stuck in their efforts to separate Jeeva and Gyan. It all causes them to break the statue. Dubey becomes unconscious of this incident. Badri and Budh help Dubey Ji to repair the statue and make it clear and shine.
53	"Apna School, Apna Ped"
Rathi orders school security guard Patil to cut down a tree, as crows were sitting on it causing noise and spoiling Rathi's car 'Ram Piyari'. Both Badrinath and Budhdeb try to save the tree from being chopped down and climb on it. Other students try to bring them down from it, but all fail. The determination of Badrinath and Budhdeb brings a change in the minds of all students and teachers and they run to save the tree.
54	"Baap Re Baap! Saanp"
Badrinath runs quickly to be saved from a snake, but then he sees a remote-control for the toy snake in Karan's hands. Badrinath, Budhdeb, and Karan make a plan to scare other students. When they get scared, the students complain to the teachers. Badrinath and Budhdeb find a real snake, which further scares everyone. Yoginath Ji comes and identifies both snakes. He gives the toy snake to Karan and takes the real snake with him.
55	"Happy Birthday Badri"
Budhdeb sells his bicycle Rockit and other belongings to celebrate Badrinath's birthday. When Badrinath asks the reason for selling the bicycle, he replies that Jeeva would return the bicycle as a birthday gift to him. Jeeva refuses to return the bicycle. Badri throws a piece of cake on Jeeva's face. Jeeva's reaction affects Gyan. In this way, everyone begins to fight with cake, destroying the whole place and party.
56	"Bhaago! Bhoot Aaya"
The teachers and school students decide to celebrate with a bonfire party in Apna School at night. They enjoy it and afterwards, everyone falls asleep. Badrinath and Budhdeb plan to scare students and they disguise themselves as ghosts. At the same time, a Burglar breaks into the school and the episode ends up creating chaos.
57	"Lallan Ki Rani"
In this episode, Dubey Ji brings a new pink-coloured scooter named 'Lallan Ki Rani'. Badrinath and Budhdeb change its name from 'Lallan Ki Rani' to 'Lallan Taap Rani' and break it down. As a result, Dubey punishes Badri and Budh. Later, Budhdeb becomes curious and rides the scooter along with Badri in the sidecar, but it gets out of control and collides with a paint shop. In the impact, it got colourfully painted.
58	"Dost Dost Na Raha"
Badrinath wants to buy a new bicycle. They both try several methods to earn money to buy a cycle. Later, Badrinath sells off Budhdeb to Karan as a slave in return for 1,000 rupees. But Karan makes him do all of his work. Jeeva steals Budhdeb from Karan to make him work and learns a lesson from Badrinath.
59	"Cycle Race"
Badrinath and Budhdeb suggest Rathi organize a cycle race in the school for students' health, to which the Principal agrees. They don't even struggle to win the race. When the race starts, Budh takes out popcorn to eat but a flock of crows chases them to get the popcorn. Being scared of crows, Badri pedals the cycle faster, winning the race.
60	"Ek Bandar School Ke Andar"
Badrinath and Budhdeb's cycle crashes and they fall. Due to the impact, Budhdeb starts to understand the language of animals. A circus van passes a nearby school and a monkey runs away to enter the school, resulting in a ruckus. Budhdeb decides to help the monkey and takes the assistance of other animals.
61	"Maalamaal Kangaal"
A school inspector comes to the school to determine whether to give the school a cheque donation. Badrinath and Budhdeb urge school peon Patel to act like Rathi Sir and meet the school inspector to receive the donation, as Rathi would not do so. They munch on the snacks that the inspector ordered. They were successful in distracting Rathi Sir and receive the donation cheque from the inspector.
62	"Chance Pe Dance"
All students learn about a dance competition on TV and try to convince Mr Rathi. He agrees to send only the best dancers to the show and before it, organizes a dance audition at the school. Jeeva tries to make Badri and Budh lose and does not compete.
63	"Mann Ka Funda"
Budhdeb decides to listen to his positive inner voice. But he fails and gets into trouble. Therefore, he decides to listen to the negative inner voice. It causes him to end up his friendship with Badri and Budh gets torn between both the voices.
64	"Dramebaazi"
Teacher's day is near. All the students decide to perform a play on Teacher's Day. Budhdeb plays the role of Mr Rathi and Budh begins to imitate Rathi for practice. Mr Rathi gets suspicious and doubtful and presumes that Dubey Sir is conspiring against him.
65	"Nanhe-Munhe"
Badrinath and Budhdeb while playing see Mr Krishnan shrinking a plant with a shrinking potion and then returning it to a normal state with extracting potion. They steal the shrinking potion to use it on Jeeva to make him shrink, but they fail and it falls on them and they become as small as mice. While eating a lollypop, they are caught by a crow. They realize the risks and get back to a normal state by taking the extracting potion.
66	"Jeeva Bana Monitor"
The discipline committee is coming to visit the school. But the class shows no discipline under Sabina as the monitor. Jeeva is made the monitor by Dubeyji on the instructions of Mr Rathi. Jeeva becomes a strict monitor and makes new rules for student discipline. Badri and Budh make Jeeva insist on getting a salary for such hard work. When Jeeva protests this, he's revoked from his monitor position and Sabina becomes monitor again.
67	"Bruce Lee Ke Chele"
Budh and Badri are inspired by Bruce Lee's Kung Fu. They begin 'BBB' Kung Fu classes to teach their classmates Kung Fu. Jeeva opens 'Shaolin's' Karate classes to compete with Badrinath and Budhdeb. He begins to teach Karate to the rest of the students. Later, Jeeva challenges Badrinath to a fight, for which the loser would close his classes. But they don't fight and try to get the opponent afraid by making poses.
68	"Paathshala Pe Taala"
Badrinath and Budhdeb become happy after learning that school will be shut down. But they become heartbroken after seeing other students in the same condition. They determine to save the school and try several methods to earn money for the school and finally save it.
69	"Chhoona Matt"
In this clip, Badrinath gets an electric shock which results in him imitating the voice of whom he touches. He speaks the voices of Dubey, Rathi, and Budhdeb. Knowing the issue, Gyan suggests another electric shock for Badrinath to fix him. Everyone starts chasing him. But when Badri becomes normal Budh faces the problem.
70	"Hum-Shakal"
Badri and Budh play hide and seek games. Budh enters a clone machine to hide. The clone creates a lot of problems for them. At last, Badrinath recognizes the real Budhdeb by finding the Rockit's key in his pocket and destroys the other clone by using the same machine.
71	"Kuk-Doo-Koo"
A magician visits the school to entertain students and teachers. He turns Badrinath into a small chicken by performing a trick. This chicken escapes and gets lost among some other chickens. Later, this chicken gets caged, but Budh comes to his rescue and saves him.
72	"Sher Pe Savasher"
The school students go on a picnic. Budh and Badri are instructed to strap the lunch boxes to the school bus roof. They eat most of the lunch and tie the boxes weakly. They fall along the way and they pretend to have been attacked by a lion who ate their lunch. They get lost in the jungle and finally are found at night with lunch boxes and are praised by the Principal.
73	"Halka-Fulka"
The inter-school wrestling competition is near, and to participate the students must weigh 35 kilograms. Jeeva works hard for it. Badrinath and Budhdeb see him as a danger and threat. They try hard to make Jeeva fears his opponent and back out of the competition.
74	"Main Yahan, Tu Wahan"
In this clip, Dubeyji makes Badrinath and Budhdeb sit away from each other to avoid having trouble. Gyan and Sabina become their new partners to encourage them to study and become good students. But it doesn't happen and later all four of them are punished.
75	"Jaadui Chirag"
While fishing on the lake, Badrinath and Budhdebb find a magical lamp. The lamp has no genie so everyone can become a genie for a time. They show the lamp to their classmates who begin to fight for it. All students get trapped inside the lamp. They enjoy it and finally find a way to escape.
76	"Happy Diwali"
Karan's father brings him firecrackers from London. Badrinath and Budhdeb have no firecrackers, so they seek Karan to let them burst firecrackers with him, but Karan refuses. They make a plan to ruin the firecrackers. Rathi orders Dubey to check for firecrackers in students' bags. Karan hides firecrackers in Badri's bag so he would be punished. But Rathi sees that these were ceiling firecrackers. The students and teachers celebrate the festival of lights together.
77	"Chalte-Chalte"
In this episode, Budhdeb begins to sleepwalk. He gets himself into many troubles and dangerous situations. So all the other students devise a plan to rescue him. In the end, the students enjoy an ice-cream party.
78	"Khel Main Jhol"
The school organizes an Annual Sports Day. All students participate in a three-legged race. But the race is cancelled due to their very bad play. Gyan becomes upset for not winning a medal. However, Badrinath and Budhdeb try their best to make him the winner and finally he wins the race.
79	"Note Main Khot"
Budhdeb finds a note of 1,000 rupees while searching for his cricket ball. The note, however, was fake. Jeeva approaches them and claims to be the note's owner. They get a party from Jeeva for the note. But 'Canteen Bhaiya' punishes Jeeva for giving him a fake note.
80	"Pair Ka Panchnama"
Badrinath and Budhdeb prank Jeeva and remove the chocolates from his pocket. Jeeva lies that his foot is broken, which they're taking advantage of, and has them punished. Later, Badrinath and Budhdeb take Jeeva's pizza away and he runs behind them to get that pizza. Rathi sees the matter and punishes Jeeva for lying.
81	"Haddi Pe Hungama"
Mr. Rathi's leg breaks due to falling. Dubey makes the students dig up the school ground to practice rainwater harvesting. While digging, Badrinath finds a bone and the students discover it to be a dinosaur's bone. Dubey gives interviews about the bone but a man comes from the archaeological department to test the bones and says that it's part of the biological skeleton.
82	"Tahkhaane Ka Rahasya"
The students plan to find treasure in the school's tower and they break into it. Mistakenly, Patel wears a mummy strip. When Badrinath and Budhdeb see it, they assume it is Jeeva playing a prank on them. So, they disguise themselves as a mummy and plan to teach him a lesson. But all are caught by Mr Rathi and are given murga punishment.
83	"Raathi Ka Sanyaas"
Rathi goes into meditation by Yoginath Ji due to having a heavy load on his brain. Due to the strictness of Dubeyji, the students try to distract Rathi in several methods and break his meditation. Badrinath and Budhdeb give a sweet dish to Yoginath Ji and when the smell reaches Rathi's nose, he breaks meditation and returns to school.
84	"Humari Adhuri Kahani"
Dubey catches Badri and Budh and punishes them for playing with a video game during class. Later, the video game is stolen from the staff room and Dubey accuses them of the theft. He takes them to Rathi, but Rathi gets angry at Dubey for falsely accusing them of stealing the game because he had taken that video game from there himself.
85	"Kile Ka Rahasya"
Dubeyji and Rathi Sir inform the students that they are going to visit a historic fort. Badri and Budh are lost in it and all other students and teachers go back. There they find a thief named 'Duggabati', who steals and hides things in the fort. The thief is arrested after getting into a fight with them. Mr Rathi praises them for their courage.
86	"Agyaan"
While going to school, Badrinath and Budhdeb hit Gyan while riding their bicycle when its brakes failed. As a result, Gyan loses his memory. Gyan fails to answer the general knowledge question for the school's trophy but Badrinath and Budhdeb answer it. After going back from school, they again hit Gyan and he returns to the normal state.
87	"Mithumiya"
To play pranks on their classmates, Badrinath and Budhdeb bring a parrot to the school, which they found when trying to pluck fruits from a tree and were imitated by it. The parrot made everyone scared. At last, Rathi discovered that Badrinath and Budhdeb were behind this mischief and punishes them.
88	"Durbin"
Badrinath finds a pair of binoculars. He and Budhdeb were able to see the future by using it. They also helped other students and teachers from dangers by using it. But later, Badri and Budh get in trouble and get punished.
89	"Chhoo Mantar"
Mr. Krishnan invents a device that can make things invisible. Badrinath and Budhdeb steal it to play pranks on students. To play a prank on Mr Rathi, they make the school disappear. Later, Badrinath makes Budhdeb invisible and frightens their classmates.
90	"April Fool"
Jeeva pranks all the students on the first of April. All of the students planned to teach him a lesson. With the help of Patil, they trick Jeeva into thinking he is invisible. Jeeva becomes happy to have vanished. At the end of the episode, because of Principal Rathi seeing him, Jeeva finds out that he is not invisible.
91	"Hasya Yog"
A sage teacher teaches Dubey Sir laughter therapy as he often gets furious in class. After one session, Dubey Sir bursts out laughing whenever he gets angry. Badrinath and Budhdeb try their best and work hard to make him angry and later, both of them were praised by Rathi.
92	"Patangbaazi"
A flying kite was repeatedly cutting Badrinath and Budhdeb's kite. But with the help of Mr Rathi and other students, they cut the other kite and win.
93	"Teen Tigaada"
Badrinath and Budhdeb challenge Mukesh, Ramesh, and Ganesh for a top game. But the triplets win. They realize that the triplets are winners due to their unity. So, they made a plan to separate them. But Gyan again unites them. In this way, their plan fails.
94	"Suno Naa"
When Dubey was in the canteen, he became temporarily deaf when two flies entered his ears. He gets help from Badrinath and Budhdeb to write papers to show the other students what he is saying. However, they misuse the opportunity. They also make 'best award' for Dubey into 'worst award'. At last, he becomes normal.
95	"Lights, Camera Aur Action"
Rathi Sir installs CCTV cameras in the whole school to keep an eye on all the students on Mr Krishnan's advice. Rathi catches Badrinath and Budhdeb many times for their bad works. Seeing the cameras, Badri and Budh behave as good students. At last, they tell all of their classmates to act bad in the shooting.
96	"Bindiya Maa"
Budh and Badri call Bindiya their mother and lied about their mother, not in the home. She becomes emotional. They take advantage of her love and affection by eating several types of foods and not getting homework. However, Jeeva tells their plan to Bindiya and they both get punished.
97	"Principal Hai Hum!"
Dubeyji is appointed the new Principal of Apna School as Mr Rathi gets promoted and leaves the school. Dubey makes strict rules and punishes everyone for not following the new rules. Badrinath and Budhdeb make a plan and finally bring Rathi Sir back.
98	"Chumbak Ka Chamatkar"
Badrinath and Budhdeb gain electromagnetic powers and start attracting all metal things due to having been struck by lightning on a stormy night while fixing a TV antenna on instructions of school peon Patel.
99	"Chatte Pe Chatta"
Badrinath and Budhdeb are chased by honeybees for trying to eat honey from a honeycomb. They reach school and the bees attack everyone. Badri, Budh, and Rathi go to honeycomb and free the bee's queen that was mistakenly taken by Badrinath and Budhdeb. In the end, Mr Rathi gives honey to the whole school.
100	"Dil Dosti Dangal"
When Budhdeb becomes more studious, it creates a bridge between him and Badrinath. Later, Jeeva reveals to Badrinath that he accidentally swapped Budhdeb’s roll number with Gyan’s.
101	"Bhavishya Ka Chakar"
The special chair of Cheeku predicts the future of all students. Budhdeb causes mischief in the school by realizing that all the predictions are coming true. In the end, the students realise that the predictions were false.
102	"Kashti Ki Masti"
Badrinath and Budhdeb are on an island after sailing a boat that goes wayward in a heavy storm. They also lose their boat and begin to search the island for food and to survive in its forest.
103	"Pehchaan Kaun"
In this episode, Jeeva loses his memory after falling from a tightrope. He only remembers Badrinath and Budhdeb's names.
104	"Rathi Ke Chamche"
Badrinath and Budhdeb saved Mr Rathi from a deadly situation. As a result, Rathi starts favouring both of them. But they misuse it and also put a stamp on Patel's leave application without obtaining Mr Rathi's consent. Therefore, they are admonished by Rathi Sir.
105	"Cinderella Story"
In the way to school Badrinath and Budhdeb find a Water buffalo. They bump on it and name it Cinderella. The buffalo, however, was stolen by a man and is locked inside a shed. They search for it and finally find it. They tie up the man with a rope and rescue the buffalo. The man starts chasing them and falls into the river.
106	"Rajkumar Badrinath"
Principal Rathi calls Badrinath and Budhdeb to his office. Seeing the tattoo on his arm, Pratap Singh informs Rathi that Badrinath is their king. He brings Badrinath to the palace. Badrinath spends his life like a king there. But the tattoo vanishes when it is washed mistakenly by Badri. So, Badri is ousted by them realizing that he isn't the king.
107	"Bandarpur"
The students and teachers of the school visit a village in need of help. Dubeyji and Rathi Sir assign every student a particular task. But they assign Badrinath and Budhdeb to help everyone complete their tasks. Monkeys, however, steal their baggage. But Badrinath and Budhdeb make the monkeys work and return their luggage. It wows everyone.
108	"Mausam Ye Mastana"
A snowfall arrives in Apna Nagar for the first time. Badrinath and Budhdeb invite their classmates to come and play in the snow. They all enjoy it. Karan ice skates and makes all others jealous. But later he falls onto a weakly frozen lake due to losing his control. But Badrinath makes a trick to save him.
109	"Dadaji Se Baatein"
Due to Badrinath and Budhdeb arriving late to school, Rathi gives them the task to arrange books in the library. While arranging, Budhadev finds a 1915 personal diary of Rathi's Grandfather. He begins to read it. Later, Budh begins to hear the voice of the statue of Rathi's Grandfather. But Rathi becomes happy in finding the diary.
110	"Rocket Ki Khoj Mein"
Badrinath and Budhdeb, being in a hurry, mistakenly stand their bicycle outside the school. Later, they realize their mistake and go to find Rockit. At last, they find it in the home of thieves. While chasing them, the thief is seen by the Principal and is sent to jail.
111	"Ring Ring Ringa"
Badrinath and Budhdeb find a yellow ring at the lake. Badrinath wears it and all his wishes come true. They also win a cricket match wearing the ring. Later, Jeeva steals it and challenges them to a football match. However, they again win it and assume that the ring isn't lucky.
112	"Rathi Ki Mehmaan Nawazi"
Budhdeb is sent by his parents as a guest to Rathi Sir. But all other students also reach there. They all eat Budhdeb's food and milk. The students party at night and try to spend the night there. However, they are caught by Rathi. In the end, they all enjoy pizza.
113	"Phata Poster Nikla Zero"
Badrinath and Budhdeb make a plan to leave the school to get the limited and free edition poster of their favourite video game 'Mega Robot'. After many tries, they finally reach the shop, but there they learn that the free poster has been sold. They learn about Jeeva and take the poster back. But, Dubey catches punishes them.
114	"Darna Mana Hai"
Rathi goes to the school storeroom to find his grandfather's watch. But there he gets locked inside. Badrinath and Budhdeb come to help him. Finally, they call Dubeyji for rescue and they all together help Rathi to be freed.
115	"Dubeyji Ki Heropanti"
Badrinath and Budhdeb see a poster of hero need. They suggest Dubeyji become a hero and also encouraged him to be a hero. He agrees and makes preparations for his role. But at the shooting, Dubey learns that the ad is about underwear and is infuriated.
116	"Machhli Jal Ki Raani Hai"
Badrinath and Budhdeb see a purple dolphin on the seashore. They take it with them and leave it in the lake nearby. They become its friends and name it 'Gulabo'. Gyan also befriends it. Rathi Sir tells them that the big sea is actually its home. Therefore, they take the dolphin to the sea saying goodbye.
117	"Laal Guitar"
In a street, fat Jeeva finds a red-coloured guitar. He sells it to Badrinath and Budhdeb for 20 rupees so that they can become rockstars. Using the guitar, they entertain the whole school. However, Mr Rathi learns that it does not belong to them and tries to find its rightful owner. At last, they find a long-bearded person who claims to be its owner. Rathi Sir brings a gift of a guitar to Badrinath and Budhdeb.
118	"Tel Ka Khel"
While coming to school in the morning, Mr Rathi's car runs out of gas and he is stranded on the road. Mr Krishnan tells students to get an earthworm to class, and Badrinath and Budhdeb begin digging. They successfully find gas underground.
119	"Budhmaan Ki Diary"
Budhdeb becomes upset after learning that he always scores zero on every test. So he tries to be attentive and serious in class. He tries to use his diary to help him. Later, Badrinath destroys Budhdeb's diary and that makes him upset.
120	"Purani Haveli"
Karan's father brings him a remote control helicopter. By mistake, it gets lost in an old castle. The students explain to Karan that there's a haunting in the castle. All students become scared to enter. But on Karan's insistence, they enter it. There, they meet a kind old man who serves them food and take the helicopter back.
121	"Big B"
While eating a chocolate bar Budhdeb mistakenly slips and the chocolate falls inside a beaker of chemicals. These chemicals were made by Mr Krishnan for research purposes. As Budhdeb starts eating chocolate, he becomes taller and taller. To stop the destruction caused by Budh, Rathi also drinks the chemical and he forcibly make Budhdeb drink another chemical which makes him normal again.
122	"Gubbaara"
Budhdeb informs Badrinath that he has stomach problems. He takes medicine from Jeeva. But this radish-based medicine makes him float in the sky. Other students try several ways to bring him down but to no avail. Krishnan Sir makes a drone and brings him back to the ground with it.
123	"Bandar Aur Magarmach"
Bindiya madam tells the students a story of a Monkey and a Crocodile. When the story was underway the period ended. The students start to predict what the end will be. Later, Jeeva, Badrinath, and Budhdeb go to the lake. There, they see the same monkey and crocodile from the story and determine to help the monkey while Jeeva helps the crocodiles. But they face troubles and escape back to school.
124	"Ek Bandar Plane Ke Andar"
Badrinath and Budhdeb buy a remote-controlled plane and fly it in the school. Dubey catches them but the Principal tells them that they will travel on a real plane. When they got onto the plane, they learn that the plane is transporting animals and it is the wrong plane. However, they land the plane successfully by the monkey who took it off.
125	"Khazane Ki Paheli"
The students play a game but their ball gets lost. While finding it, Budhdeb finds a clue about a hidden treasure. They follow the clue which leads them to another. All students join hands and they look for it. At last, they reach a hotel, where the Principal and Dubeyji were already sitting and they praised them for their sharpness.
126	"Baandh Ki Sair"
All students go on a picnic at the dam with their teachers. Along the way, the bus's brakes fail and it gets stuck on the cliff edge. Badrinath and Budhdeb save the day. At the dam's visit, they see drylands and open dams to give water to the land.
127	"Popudent"
On Dubey's suggestion, the Principal holds a contest in the school. Badri and Budh help Jeeva win it. But when they learn that the prize is a video game, they decide to participate themselves. Badrinath stands for the election to help the other students to get votes. Badri gets first while Jeeva second. However, the Principal awards Badri of an encyclopedia as first prize and a video game to Jeeva as the second prize.
128	"Raani Humari Hai"
The students play carrom. Budh and Jeeva defeat Badri and Karan. Because of this, Jeeva and Budh become good friends and that causes the friendship of Badrinath and Budhdeb to break. Later, Budh discovers Jeeva's purpose for friendship. Badrinath challenges Jeeva to play carrom with him and he defeats Jeeva and gets his friend back.
129	"Yantra-Tantra Ka Satyanaash"
Rathi Sir hates the video games played by students during the sports class. He makes a flying corps of teachers to catch students with gadgets and punish them. The students learn about the corps, and they make a plan to outsmart their teachers.
130	"Tu Tu-Main Main"
Principal Rathi Sir makes the students exercise for fitness and health. Due to their fatigue from this, the students fell asleep in class. Dubey is blamed by Rathi for this. Dubey takes the test of students, everyone fails in it. As a result, the whole class is punished.
131	"Hichkiyan"
Badrinath and Budhdeb get continuous hiccups from eating something. To make the hiccups stop, the students and teachers suggest tricks that all fail. In the end, all students get hiccups and cannot take part in a singing competition. The announcer also gets hiccups.
132	"Dubey Ji Ki Pariksha"
Rathi Sir learns that Dubey Sir has not passed the school board's internal exam. It makes Dubey upset. When Badrinath and Budhdeb hear of it, they help Dubey to prepare for his exam. In the end, Rathi finds Dubey's result card.
133	"Jokers"
Badrinath and Budhdeb see a circus and they plan to enter it without buying a ticket. They get in see jokers' tricks. They also practice becoming jokers and also showcase their acts and tricks at the circus.
134	"Secret Club"
Budhdeb, making an excuse, leaves the lunch table. Badrinath following to spy on him to discover the reason. He finds that Budhdeb has formed a secret club and joins him. Together, they recruit more members and give them an entrance test. Jeeva suggests them a new code. All the students and teachers become members.
135	"Marathon"
Principal announces a marathon in Apna Nagar. Badrinath and Budhdeb ride their cycle to win the race through a shortcut. Jeeva also wins by travelling by bus. Later, Rathi Sir learns what they did and punishes them.
136	"Mere Desh Ki Dharti"
The students and teachers go on a trip. There they learn about farming and offer to help in the village. Later, Badrinath and Budhdeb are caught up in a trouble. They also help the farmer unknowingly and leave him overjoyed.
137	"Baal Ki Dukaan"
Karan's new hairstyle astonishes everyone. He becomes a school superstar. Badri and Budh decide to get a hair cut, too. They go to a barber but dislike the haircuts. Therefore, they themselves cut and fix their hair, making themselves bald in the process. In the end, their wigs fall and everyone laughs seeing their bald heads.
138	"Mega Villain"
Badrinath and Budhdeb try to solve a Rubik's cube and cheat their way through it. Later, they see a spaceship and follow it. They see an alien coming out of it. They meet him and spend the whole night in attempts to catch it.
139	"Digital School"
Badrinath and Budhdeb go to the computer room and try to open its door to play games. The door has a digital lock and they don't know the password. Rathi Sir discovers that someone is trying to break into the computer room.
140	"Plastic Se Dushmani"
Badrinath and Budhdeb throw out the tiffin and plastic boxes of all students after learning that a bull had eaten plastic, which they then take to the hospital. All the students unite to ban plastic and to stop its use.
141	"Chota Manjan"
Students and teachers visit the police station to learn about police work. There, they see a poster of 'Chota Manjan' who was a very dangerous man wanted by police. Badri and Budh find a man whom they mistake for 'Chota Manjan' and capture him. But, the real wanted man comes; they catch him and hand him over to the police.
142	"Pol Khol"
A new student comes to the school named 'Chajju Chapekar'. He is very intelligent in his studies and very good at sports. All students become furious and they make a plan to defeat him. Later, Badrinath and Budhdeb follow his tracks and find out that he isn't a student but rather a short elderly man.
143	"Duniya Mutthi Mein"
Badrinath and Budhdeb find a remote in the street. The remote can rewind, forward, and pause the world. They use it for their own benefit like being safe from punishment, winning a race, and eating Jeeva's tiffin by stopping time. Jeeva fought with them for the remote. At last, they disappear from the world. Anyhow, they get back and throw the remote into a stream.
144	"Teacher's Canteen"
Dubey Sir finds no place in the canteen to eat lunch. Badrinath and Budhdeb find the teacher's canteen to eat to their fill. They play pranks on Jeeva and make him get punished.
145	"Jeeva Ki Shirt"
While going to school, Badrinath blows bubbles on Jeeva. Jeeva's shirt spoils and gets flowed in the stream. But Badrinath and Budhdeb bring him to school by taking the advantage of aboard. But when the school group photo is being taken, the board falls and Jeeva shrieks.
146	"Kaala Akshar Budh Barabar"
When students learn about a school health camp they become afraid. The doctor injects Jeeva. When Budh wasn't able to read letters on the board, he makes Budhdeb wear glasses to see clearly. But later, the doctor discovers that Budh can't read alphabets with Dubey's help.
147	"AC Ki Aisi Ki Taisi"
As Badrinath and Budhdeb reach school, they learn that the principal has installed an air conditioner in his room. They tell other students. The students become disappointed and try various ways to cool their classroom. They successfully make an air cooler. Meanwhile, the principal's air conditioner breaks down, so he orders students to bring their air cooler to his office until hs air conditioner is repaired.
148	"Gyan Ka App"
Gyan behaves oddly at school. Dubey and the students wonder why Gyan has such strange behaviour. They keep follow him and find him talking to a girl. They try to find out who the girl is but fail. Later, Gyan reveals in the class that he was talking to his new girl app, which is very genius and can answer any question.
149	"Pani Ki Kahani"
The lake dries. When Badrinath and Budhdeb reach there, they notice that it's gone. The principal explains that due to scarcity, they will be rationing water from now on. Later, the students practice rainwater harvesting in the rain.
150	"Chidiya Ghar"
The teachers and students visit a zoo. There, on Jeeva's request, Badrinath and Budhdeb take his photos with the animals. But a monkey steals their camera. The students spend the whole day getting it back. Later, Jeeva pretends to be a lion and scares Badrinath and Budhdeb.
151	"Neend Na Aaye"
Badrinath and Budhdeb are dozing on the way to school due to playing games the whole night before. They are tired yet suffer from insomnia. In school, the students and Dubeyji try to make them sleep but fail. Later, they fall asleep, and seeing them, all other students and Dubeyji also sleep. Budh and Badri wake up and complain to Rathi Sir. He wakes everyone. However, when Badrinath and Budhdeb go to the Principal office, they see that he is also sleeping.
152	"Paathshala Mein Tabela"
Badrinath and Budhdeb reach school and find that there is a stable there. Rathi Sir becomes furious about this. He tries to find the property papers of the school, to get his school ground back. The goats and buffalo keep wandering in the school. The person and his wife spoil school. However, all the students make a plan to strike them out. They play cricket and all the balls break their house. They leave the school. When Rathi brings property papers, all had gone and he becomes overjoyed.
153	"Krishnan Mechanic"
Badrinath and Budhdeb bring a small fan to school. They seek help from Krishnan to fix it when it breaks down. While fixing it, he gets hypnotized and believes that he's the world's best mechanic. He starts to work in the garage but the students bring him back successfully and de-hypnotize him. He becomes normal and fixes the fan.
154	"Yahi Hai Lallantaap"
Rathi tasks all the students to make something ‘best out of waste’. However, Badrinath and Budhdeb misinterpret it as ‘best out of best’. They come up with bizarre ideas and are appreciated by the Principal.
155	"Dimag Mein Khalbali"
Budhdeb sees a traffic inspector working and is inspired by his profession. When he sees Dubey's teacher, he again gets inspired. He starts behaving like a traffic inspector and teacher. Badrinath understands that there is something wrong with Budh's brain and he fixes it.
156	"Bura Na Mano Holi Hai"
Badrinath and Budhdeb go to Jeeva and Karan's house to throw colours on them at the festival of Holi. Jeeva learns about this and he warns Gyan that Badrinath and Budhdeb are outside the house to throw colours on them. Gyan makes a plan with the rest of the students to take revenge on them.
