= List of programmes broadcast by Sony YAY! =

This is a list of television programs currently and formerly broadcast by Sony YAY!. The channel was launched on 18 April 2017.

== Current programming ==
- Jujutsu Kaisen
- Bernard
- Chimpoo Simpoo
- Chorr Police
- Honey Bunny
- Ding Dong Bell - Masti Ka Khel
- Harry & Bunnie
- Horrid Henry
- Mr. Magoo
- Naruto Shippuden
- Oggy and the Cockroaches
- Oggy and the Cockroaches: Next Generation
- Shin-chan
- Paap-O-Meter
- PaJaMa
- Robotan
- Oscar's Oasis
- Taarak Mehta Kka Chhota Chashmah
- Oggy Oggy
- The Owl & Co
- Sergeant Keroro

== Former programming ==
- Casper's Scare School
- Fab5 Mission Tango
- Kikoriki
- Kong: The Animated Series
- Little Spirou
- Magical Hat
- Marude Dameo
- Mother Goose Club
- Mirette Investigates
- Naruto
- Paper Port
- Ratz
- Space Goofs
- Spectacular Spider-Man
- Tensai Bakabon
- Guru Aur Bhole
- Kicko & Super Speedo
- Pyaar Mohabbat Happy Lucky

== Films ==
- Honey Bunny Gangs of Film City
- Honey Bunny in the World Tour Challenge
- Honey Bunny Save the Panda
- Paap-O-Meter Under Attack
- Tapu and the Big Fat Alien Wedding
