= Sonal Kaushal =

Indian voice actress

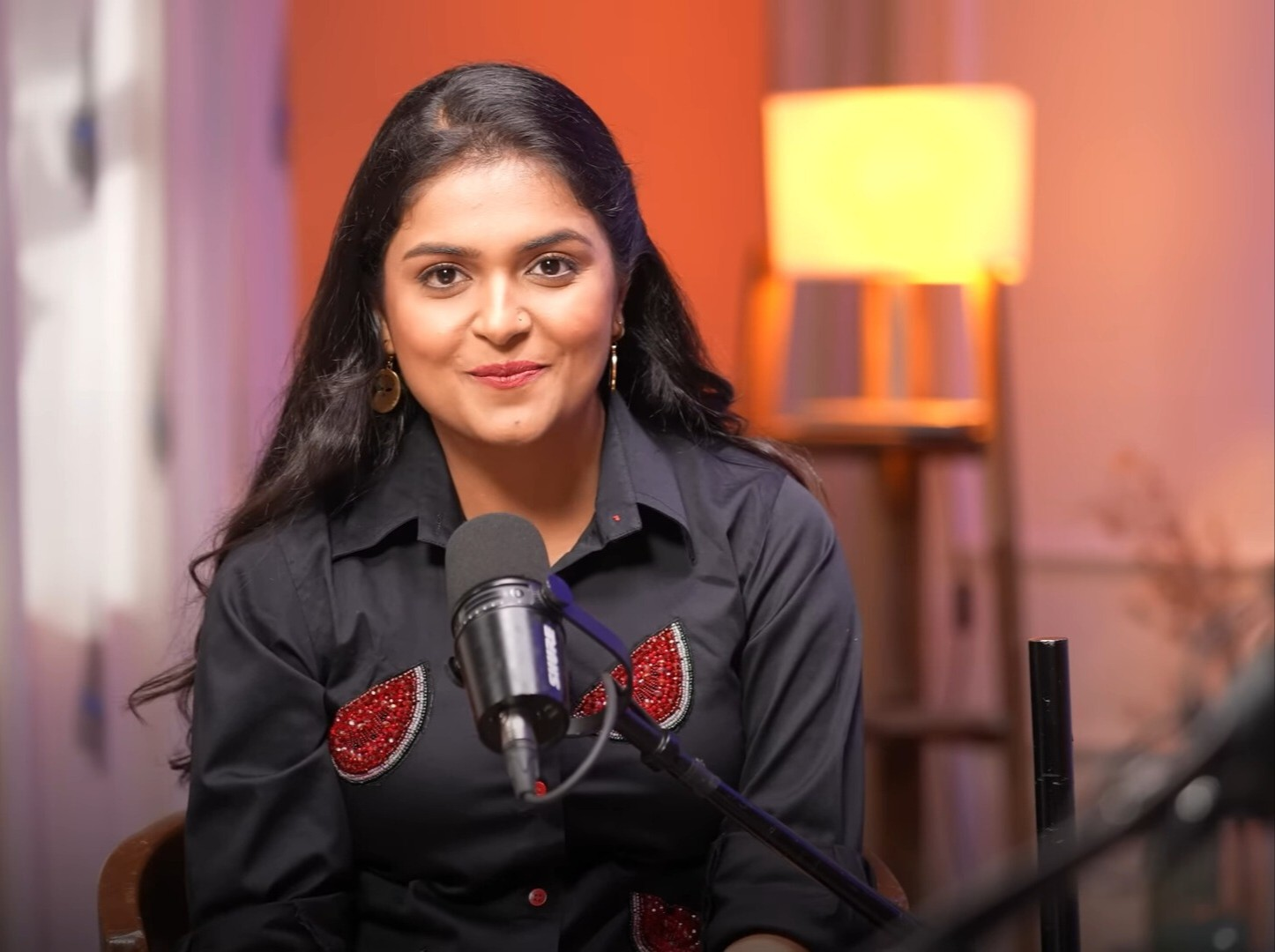
- Born: 11 June 1991 (age 35); Delhi, India
- Other name: The Motor Mouth
- Occupations: Voice actress Known for Hindi voice of Doraemon
- Spouse: Utkarsh Bali (m. 2020)
- Children: 1

YouTube information
- Channel: The Motor Mouth
- Subscribers: 6.36million
- Views: 2.3 billion
- Last updated: 08 February 2026

Sonal Kaushal is an Indian voice artist, well known for her work in Doraemon, voicing the lead role, Doraemon.

She is more commonly known as 'The Motor Mouth', because she voices a number of characters in cartoons. She also voiced Budhdev in Bandbudh Aur Budbak, Babli in Little Singham and many more.

She was also the Hindi dubbing voice of Christina Materson as Emma Goodall (the Megaforce/Super Megaforce Pink Ranger) in Power Rangers Megaforce and Power Rangers Super Megaforce. She also voiced Gina in Malibu Rescue, Malibu Rescue: The Next Wave, and the Malibu Rescue TV series. She was also the Hindi dubbing voice of Johnny Test in its show's second Hindi dub and in its revival show.

== Career ==
Kaushal's dubbing career started at the age of 8. It is unknown what she voiced at that time. Her first known role was of Doraemon in 2005. She became a fan-favourite as everyone loved her voice. She started YouTube channel named 'TheMotorMouth', where she voiced different other characters and also interviewed other voice-actors. In 2023 she voiced the main character Rani from the short animated film, 'Bandits of Golak' in Star Wars Visions season 2 by studio 88 Pictures.

== Filmography ==
=== Animated series ===
Year	Title	Role	Notes
2005–2020	Doraemon	Doraemon	
2015–2017	Bandbudh Aur Budbak	Budhdev	
2019–Present	Little Singham	Babli	
2020–Present	Pinaki and Happy	Pinaki	
2020–Present	Titoo	Titoo	
2023	Star Wars: Visions	Rani	Episode: "The Bandits of Golak"

== Dubbing Roles ==
=== Live-action series ===
Program title	Actress	Character	Dub Language	Original language	Number of episodes	Original airdate	Dubbed airdate
Power Rangers Dino Charge and Power Rangers Dino Super Charge	Camille Hyde	Shelby Watkins / Pink Ranger	Hindi	English	44	February 7, 2015 – December 10, 2016	
Vincenzo	Jeon Yeo-been	Hong Cha-young	Hindi	Korean	20	February 20, 2021	
All of Us Are Dead	Park Ji-hu	Nam On-jo	Hindi	Korean	12	January 28, 2022	January 28, 2022
Business Proposal	Seol In-ah	Jin Young-seo	Hindi	Korean	12	February 28, 2022	

=== Animated series ===
Program title	Original voice	Character	Dub language	Original language	Number of episodes	Original airdate	Dubbed airdate	Notes
Doraemon	Wasabi Mizuta	Doraemon	Hindi	Japanese		April 15, 2005 –2017	2005	
Batman: The Animated Series	Arleen Sorkin	Harley Quinn	Hindi	English	65	September 5, 1992 - September 17, 1993		Streaming on Netflix.
Jake and the Never Land Pirates	Madison Pettis	Izzy	Hindi	English	116	February 14, 2011 – November 6, 2016		
Pokémon	Ikue Ohtani	Pikachu	Hindi	Japanese				
The Powerpuff Girls	Kristen Li	Bubbles Utonium	Hindi	English	3	April 4, 2016 – June 16, 2019		
The Grim Adventures of Billy & Mandy	Grey DeLisle	Mandy (Preeti in Hindi version)	Hindi	English	77	August 24, 2001 – November 9, 2007		
Dragon Ball Super	Miki Itō	Android 18	Hindi	Japanese	76	July 5, 2015 – March 25, 2018	2022	
Lego Ninjago: Masters of Spinjitzu	Jillian Michaels (seasons 1-7); Samuel Vincent (seasons 8-present)	Lloyd (Green Ninja)	Hindi	English	210	1/14/2011- 4/12/2012		This show aired on Nickelodeon Sonic and on Cartoon Network India and only 28 episodes of the show aired on those channels in 2011 and 2012 (including the two pilot episodes, "Way of the Ninja" and "King of Shadows" and all of the episodes of Season 1 of Ninjago, "Rise of the Snakes"), but starting from May 25, 2021 – January 30, 2022, they started airing all episodes of Ninjago from seasons 2-15 on that same channel and on Cartoon Network India with a unknown Hindi dubbing cast for all the new villains in seasons 2-15 of the show. Kaushal also reprised her role to voice Lloyd in the Urdu dub of this show.

=== Animated films ===
Film title	Actor	Character	Dub language	Original language	Original Year Release	Dub Year Release
Stand by Me Doraemon	Wasabi Mizuta	Doraemon	Hindi	Japanese	2014	2014
Incredibles 2	Sarah Vowell	Violet Parr	Hindi	English	2018	2018
Toy Story 4	Christina Hendricks	Gabby Gabby	Hindi	English	2019	2019
The Super Mario Bros. Movie	Juliet Jelenic	Lumalee	Hindi	English	2023	2023
Ramayana: The Legend of Prince Rama	Rael Padamsee	Sita	Hindi	English	10 January 1993 (International Film Festival of India); 3 November 1997 (Japan)	24 January, 2025

=== Live action films ===
Film title	Actor	Character	Dub language	Original language	Original Year Release	Dub Year Release	Notes
Home Alone	Macaulay Culkin	Kevin McCalister	Hindi	English	November 16, 1990	October 18, 1991	
Home Alone 2: Lost in New York	Macaulay Culkin	Kevin McCalister	Hindi	English	1992	1992	
Home Sweet Home Alone	Archie Yates	Max Mercer	Hindi	English	2021	2021	
Home Alone 3	Rya Kihlstedt	Alice Ribbons	Hindi	English	1997	1997	
Home Alone: The Holiday Heist	Christian Martyn	Finn Baxter	Hindi	English	2012	2012	
Thor: Love and Thunder	India Hemsworth	Love	Hindi	English	2022	2022	
Doctor Strange in the Multiverse of Madness	Xochitl Gomez	America Chavez (Marvel Cinematic Universe)	Hindi	English	2022	2022	
The Host	Saoirse Ronan	Melanie Stryder / Wanderer a.k.a. Wanda	Hindi	English	2013	2013	
Her	Scarlett Johansson (voice)	Samantha	Hindi	English	2013	2013	
In the Dog House	Logan Dondanville	Justin	Hindi	English	2014	2014	
Alice Through the Looking Glass	Mia Wasikowska	Alice Kingsleigh	Hindi	English	2016	2016	
The Unholy	Cricket Brown	Alice Pagett	Hindi	English	2021	2021	
Freaky Ali	Amy Jackson	Megha	Hindi	Hindi	2016		
The Body	Vedhika	Ritu/Isha	Hindi	Hindi	2019		
Hebbuli	Prachi R. Naik	Ritu Sathyamoorthy	Hindi	Kannada	2017	2018	
