= Pinaki & Happy – The Bhoot Bandhus =

Indian animated series

- Promotional poster
- Genre: Slapstick comedy Horror
- Written by: Gulzar (title track)
- Directed by: Nitish Kumar
- Voices of: Sonal Kaushal; Rajesh Kava; Manoj Pandey; Aranya Kaur; Pawan Kalra; Meghna Erande; Bhakti Jhaveri; Pooja Punjabi; Samarth Korde; Saudamini; Rajesh Shukla
- Theme music composer: Simaab Sen
- Country of origin: India
- Original languages: Hindi; English

Production
- Producer: Tavrohi Animations
- Running time: 11 minutes
- Production company: Tavrohi Animations Private Limited

Original release
- Network: Nickelodeon Sonic
- Release: 9 November 2020 – present

Pinaki & Happy – The Bhoot Bandhus, also known as simply Pinaki & Happy, is an Indian animated horror comedy television series directed by Nitish Kumar for Nickelodeon Sonic. The series showcases the story of an unusual family of ghosts who adopt a boy named Pinaki and raise him as one of their own. The series is produced by Tavrohi Animations. The lyrics for the title track of the series are written by poet and lyricist Gulzar, and the music is created by Simaab Sen. It premiered on 9 November 2020.

== Synopsis ==
Set in the fictional town of Modern City, India, lies a haunted house named Vibhooti Mansion. Unbeknownst to the townspeople, an eleven-year-old human boy named Pinaki lives with the ghosts haunting the mansion. As a baby, Pinaki was found on the doorstep of the mansion, along with a note stating that the ghosts who live there are in charge to protect him. The ghosts eventually began raising Pinaki, serving as the catalyst for the events of the show. The ghost family consists of by Col. Chiku Suri and his lovely wife, Bubbly Suri, who enjoys cooking unusual dishes, along with Happy, who acts as a big brother to Pinaki, and Gappu, their talking pet dog. As time passes, Pinaki grows up and ages while being protected by the ghosts within the mansion's boundaries. Eventually, he decides to step outside to see the world beyond and pursue education at Modern City's famous public school, Modern City High School. As a result, the family has no choice but to leave the haunted house for the first time.

Each 11-minute episode focuses on the spooky adventures of Pinaki and his ghost family, accompanied by a series of fun-filled slapstick misadventures as they try to fit into the outside world. Pinaki ultimately resolves their conflicts with humans while constantly striving to keep his family's hidden identity intact.

== Characters ==
- Pinaki (Voiced by Sonal Kaushal)- He is an eleven-year-old smart, and well-learned kid, who has been brought up by his unusual family of ghosts. Things take a turn when he gets admission to a local school and interacts with humans. Pinaki is also a bit naughty and generally works towards making things go in his favor. He tries his best to balance his life between school and his family of ghosts. He is very attentive in class and scores well at school. He is his teacher's favorite.
- Happy (Voiced by Rajesh Kava)- He is like an elder brother to Pinaki. They both have a very friendly equation. He is the youngest and funniest ghost in the family, almost like Johnny Bravo. He is 18 years old. He is an over-the-top, dramatic teen. Most of the time his silly mistakes end up escalating the problems. He loves singing and speaks funny one-liners, cracks jokes, and makes everyone laugh.
- Gappu (Voiced by Meghana Erande)- The pet dog of Col. Suri. Ever since he became a ghost, he realized that he could talk like humans. He is a scientist at heart and loves to invent new Bhootiya (Ghostly) gadgets to help himself and the family.
- Col. Vibhuti Suri / Uncle Suri / Chikoo (Voiced by Manoj Pandey)- He is the senior-most ghost of the family. He takes decisions and maintains discipline in the mansion like any Army colonel. However, when it comes to the reputation of the family or ghost community or the safety of one of his own, he can bend the rules and go all out. His mummy calls him Chikoo.
- Mrs. Bubbly Suri / Aunty Suri (Voiced by Aranya Kaur)- She is the wife of Col. Suri. She is very firm and strong in nature, yet too kind towards our protagonist Pinaki. She loves him from her soul. She loves to cook and thinks she is a great cook. She likes to cook some odd dishes that generally taste bad. Everyone is scared of her cooking as she keeps inventing weird recipes.
- Shantu (Voiced by Rajesh Shukla)- He is another one of Pinaki's classmates. He is a snarky kid and a bully as well. He loves to pick on Pinaki because after his admission of his school, he loses his first spot in sports and games, and since then, he has developed a grudge and tries to be troublesome to him, which always goes awry.
- Chintu and Mintu (Voiced by Samarth Korde/Asmita Dabhole and Saudamini)- They are the sidekicks of Shantu. They feed him information that he needs and they also support him. They also execute his devious antics. Mintu is the one who encounters paranormal activity most of the time, but no one believes him, not even his twin brother, Chintu.
- Dheeru Sir (Voiced by Pawan Kalra)- He is Pinaki's class teacher. He is middle aged and speaks with a Bihari accent. He is a bit laid back about everything. He is fond of Pinaki. He also makes funny sounds when he falls asleep.
- Sohail (Voiced by Pooja Punjabi)- He is one of Pinaki's classmates and his first best friend. He is also scared of things sometimes, but whenever the kids are in trouble or feel like things don't go their way, he starts talking very fast, extremely fast.
- Dimpy (Voiced by Bhakti Jhaveri)- She is also one of Pinaki's classmates and his second-best friend. She is one of the most courageous girls anyone can come across and is always up for an adventure.
- Principal Sir (Voiced by Pawan Kalra)- He is the principal of Pinaki's school.
- Aisha- She is the elder sister of Sohail and a detective.
- Miss Meeti- She is the science teacher of Pinaki's school. When Shantu makes disturbance in her classes, she gives him big punishments, such as write an esay on Rocket and Shantu's Mom, in 2999 words, and make experiments 1099 times!
- Cap Uncle - He is a fake real estate agent. He fakes others by telling them to rent their houses. He is an enemy of Pinaki and his ghost family. He always tries to destroy Vibhooti Mansion, but he could never do that because Pinaki and his ghost family always stopped him from doing so.
- Naani - She is Bubbly's Mother Ghost. She hates Pinaki in the beginning. Later She realizes his kindness and forgiveness and supports him.
- Bhoot Baby - He is Bubbly's Friend's Baby Ghost. He always uses his bhoot power to give trouble to Pinaki, Happy, and Gappu.

== Broadcast ==
The series has been aired on Nickelodeon Sonic since November 2020. It has entered the Top 10 of the kids' category. A TV movie, Bhoot Bandhus & the Power of Three, was broadcast.
