= List of Dawn of the Croods episodes =

Dawn of the Croods is an American 2D-animated web television series that is produced by DreamWorks Animation. The series is based on the 2013 animated film The Croods, taking place before the events of the film. It premiered on December 24, 2015, on Netflix. Sam Riegel voice directs this series. Season 2 premiered on August 26, 2016. Season 3 premiered on April 7, 2017. Season 4 premiered on July 7, 2017.

The adventures of the series takes place before the events of the film, with Eep having new friends, and the rest of the Croods facing new enemy creatures, such as bearowls.

52 episodes of Dawn of the Croods have been released, concluding the series. On July 9, 2017, executive producer Hay replied on Twitter to a question about whether the fourth season would be the last season, saying that it "most likely" would be.

== Series overview ==
Season	Segments	Episodes	Originally released
1	17	13	December 24, 2015
2	24	13	August 26, 2016
3	24	13	April 7, 2017
4	24	13	July 7, 2017

== Episodes ==
=== Season 1 (2015) ===
No. overall	No. in season	Title	Directed by	Written by	Storyboard by	Original release date
1	1	"A Gran Day Out"	Chuckles Austen & Erik Wiese	Brendan Hay	Alex Almaguer, Seung Cha, Ian Graham, Chong Lee & Seung-Hyun Oh	December 24, 2015
Grug comes to grips when Ugga takes in her mother Gran who has an ongoing feud with Grug while Eep tries to fit in with a popular crowd, but is embarrassed by her family and Gran.
2	2	"School of Hard Rocks"	Chong Lee	Caitlin Meares	Alex Almaguer, Seung Cha, Marlon Deane, Sherann Johnson, Max Lawson & Mike Nassar	December 24, 2015
The mean-spirited new teacher at Eep's school pairs her with an oddball student named Lerk while Grug tries to homeschool Thunk to make him a hunter.
3a	3a	"Wet Hot Ahhh! Valley Summer"	Stephanie Arnett & Chong Lee	Caitlin Meares	Hillary Bradfield, Seung Cha, Crystal Chesney-Thompson, Marcelo de Souza, Naz Ghodrati-Azadi, Fred Gonzales & Mike Nassar	December 24, 2015
A dare contest makes Eep and Thunk do something crazy at the Watering Hole, and Ugga must overcome her fear of water to save them.
3b	3b	"Grug Vs. The Moon"	Alex Almaguer & Joshua Taback	Dan Milano	Crystal Chesney-Thompson, Naz Ghodrati-Azadi & Max Lawson	December 24, 2015
Grug tries to fight the moon, but his efforts are in vain.
4	4	"This Mean Warts"	Alex Almaguer	Matthew Beans	Seung Cha, Marlon Deane, Sherann Johnson, Max Lawson & Mike Nassar	December 24, 2015
The snobbish new neighbors of the Croods called the Boors get on their bad side, but the parents must put their feud aside when their offspring go missing.
5	5	"The First Picture Show"	Alex Almaguer	Matthew Beans	Seung Cha, Naz Ghodrati-Azadi & Max Lawson	December 24, 2015
Thunk unleashes his story ideas through shadow puppets, but the attention he receives is all but what he wanted.
6	6	"Caved & Confused"	Alex Almaguer & Stephanie Arnett	Tom Sheppard	Seung Cha & Max Lawson	December 24, 2015
Against her parents wishes, Eep throws a party while Grug and Ugga have a night out together. Things don't turn out like she wanted.
7a	7a	"The Eep-Over"	Stephanie Arnett & Chong Lee	Caitlin Meares	Crystal Chesney-Thompson, Naz Ghodrati-Azadi & Max Lawson	December 24, 2015
Eep has her first slumber party in a cave and her worrying family inadvertently make it a frightening night.
7b	7b	"Thunkytown"	Alex Almaguer	Laura Beck	Seung Cha, Marcelo de Souza & Fred Gonzales	December 24, 2015
Because of Thunk's dislike for a certain meal, he leads a pack of Bearowls to the Croods cave and when the Boor's cave is overtaken by an Albatrocerous, the 2 rival clans are forced to share a cave while Eep and Thunk try to reverse the situation.
8	8	"Mom Genes"	Stephanie Arnett & Chong Lee	Dan Milano	Seung Cha, Max Lawson & Mike Nassar	December 24, 2015
Ugga's pacifist nature is renounced when she becomes a wild hunter with very dangerous results.
9	9	"Garden of Eaten"	Chong Lee	Kyle Mack	Alex Almaguer, Seung Cha, Marlon Deane & Sherann Johnson	December 24, 2015
Eep takes a liking to vegetables and rallies her family to give them a try which puts Grug in a crazy pickle when eating a forbidden fruit at the Garden of Eaten.
10a	10a	"Night of the Living Croods"	Joshua Taback	Matthew Beans	Gus Corrales & Erica Hayes	December 24, 2015
The Croods' proposal to take the world's first nap takes a scary twist on his neighbors.
10b	10b	"A Spoonful of Soo-Gar"	Chong Lee	Laura Beck	Seung Cha, Marcelo de Souza & Fred Gonzales	December 24, 2015
A sugar rush overtakes the Croods when the get a craving for honey from a beehive.
11	11	"Friday Night Liyotes"	Brian Hatfield	Caitlin Meares	Steve Evangelatos & Helder Mendonca	December 24, 2015
Grug and Eep get competitive when playing a volleyball-like game that Grug's team always win (mostly because they play against non-competing Liyotes).
12a	12a	"The Crood Who Knew Too Much"	Alex Almaguer	Eric Acosta	Fred Gonzales & David Scott Smith	December 24, 2015
After getting a giant head from a Spiderant bite, everybody is convinced that Grug is now completely intelligent and he uses this to outstrip Snoot's role as Ahhh! Valley's Problem Solver.
12b	12b	"Scent of a Thunk"	Brian Hatfield & Chong Lee	Dave Polsky	Hillary Bradfield & Marcelo de Souza	December 24, 2015
After making a spectacle of himself, Thunk is forced to change his ways.
13	13	"Unsolved MysterEep"	Steve Evangelatos & Deborah Winslow	Matthew Beans	Helder Mendonca	December 24, 2015
Stuff is missing and when people believe the silly idea that the stuff went missing on its own, Eep dismisses this and is convinced that a thief is in their midst.

=== Season 2 (2016) ===
No. overall	No. in season	Title	Directed by	Written by	Original release date
14a	1a	"Gran the Unfriendly Ghost"	Brian Hatfield & Chong Lee	Written by : Caitlin Meares; Storyboarded by : Hillary Bradfield & Luke Weber	August 26, 2016
Fed up with being ignored, Gran fakes her own death and haunts her family, but the Croods are anything but intimidated at this work.
14b	1b	"Bad Sandy"	Alex Almaguer	Written by : Mike Yank; Storyboarded by : Max Lawson & David Scott Smith	August 26, 2016
The Croods have to control Sandy's primitive behavior or she will be thrown out of Ahhh! Valley.
15a	2a	"It Crushes"	Alex Almaguer	Written by : Matthew Beans; Storyboarded by : Fred Gonzales & Max Lawson	August 26, 2016
Eep falls for a handsome new teenager at her school.
15b	2b	"Rebel Without a Paws"	Crystal Chesney-Thompson	Written by : Rachel Vine; Storyboarded by : Seung Cha & Ed Tadem	August 26, 2016
Thunk befriends a group of Liyotes, but the Croods try to convince him that they only want food.
16a	3a	"Grug vs. Math"	Alex Almaguer	Story by : Dave Polsky; Written by : Matthew Beans, Caitlin Meares, Mike Yank; Storyboarded by : Fred Gonzales & David Scott Smith	August 26, 2016
Grug struggles to do 'math', which is now a method of hunting, with Sqwak's help.
16b	3b	"Footloss"	Crystal Chesney-Thompson	Written by : Brendan Hay; Storyboarded by : Seung Cha & Mike Nassar	August 26, 2016
When the adults forbid dancing, the teenagers decide to have a secret underground dance place.
17a	4a	"The Good Surprise"	Brian Hatfield	Written by : Matthew Beans; Storyboarded by : Gus Corrales & Marcelo de Souza	August 26, 2016
When Ugga gets cranky, Eep and Thunk decide to surprise her to cure her of her bad mood.
17b	4b	"Night Mare on Eep Street"	Crystal Chesney-Thompson	Written by : Brendan Hay; Storyboarded by : Seung Cha & Mike Nassar	August 26, 2016
Eep goes through hallucinations to capture a 'Night Mare' in order to look good in front of her class.
18a	5a	"What Screams May Come"	Crystal Chesney-Thompson	Written by : Mike Yank; Storyboarded by : Mike Nassar & Ed Tadem	August 26, 2016
When Eep makes the scream-leading team, Meep Boor, the new head coach, begins badly influencing her.
18b	5b	"Grunt Anything"	Brian Hatfield	Written by : Nate Federman; Storyboarded by : Marcelo de Souza	August 26, 2016
When Meep kicks Snoot out for his cowardliness, he bunks with the Croods, who are less than thrilled at having him.
19a	6a	"There Will Be Eggs"	Alex Almaguer	Written by : Mike Yank; Storyboarded by : Fred Gonzales & David Scott Smith	August 26, 2016
Eep and Thunk discover an underground treasure of golden eggs and greed begins to overtake them.
19b	6b	"I Think Were Alone Meow"	Brian Hatfield	Written by : Caitlin Meares; Storyboarded by : Marcelo de Souza & Allan Jacobsen	August 26, 2016
Gran befriends a pack of Crabby-Tabbies (cat-crab mix creatures) who wish to be crabby to all while Grug and Ugga take desperate measures to get into Snoot's party.
20	7	"FrEepy Friday"	Alex Almaguer & Crystal Chesney-Thompson	Written by : Rachel Vine; Storyboarded by : Naz Ghodrati-Azadi, Fred Gonzales, Max Lawson & Mike Nassar	August 26, 2016
When Eep is literately grounded for causing mischief, she bets Grug that he can't take the teen life, so the ever prideful Grug sets out to prove her wrong, but he ends up in danger.
21a	8a	"Grug vs. Gurg"	Brian Hatfield	Written by : Laura Beck; Storyboarded by : Gus Corrales & Allan Jacobsen	August 26, 2016
Grug meets a doppelganger of his named Gurg (voiced by Christian Slater) and he has Gurg pretend to be him so he won't do his chores, but Gurg decides to steal his family away.
21b	8b	"Unfair Fair"	Alex Almaguer	Written by : Matthew Beans; Storyboarded by : Max Lawson & David Scott Smith	August 26, 2016
Eep and Thunk resort to cheating in an idea fair project.
22a	9a	"Baby Face Off"	Crystal Chesney-Thompson	Written by : Jason Reich; Storyboarded by : Seung Cha & Ed Tadem	August 26, 2016
Sandy is framed by a new baby for misbehavior when Thunk looks after them.
22b	9b	"The Pursuit of Wrinkliness"	Brian Hatfield	Written by : Caitlin Meares; Storyboarded by : Gus Corrales & Jean Kang	August 26, 2016
Gran decides to toughen Thunk up when she feels like he's too soft.
23a	10a	"Croodtopia"	Brian Hatfield & Chong Lee	Written by : Caitlin Meares; Storyboarded by : Hillary Bradfield & Luke Weber	August 26, 2016
The teenagers decide to make a 'rule-free' zone for them to have fun in.
23b	10b	"Hands on a Hard Egg"	Crystal Chesney-Thompson	Written by : Matthew Beans; Storyboarded by : Seung Cha & Mike Nassar	August 26, 2016
Eep participates in a contest to see who can lay their hands on a giant egg.
24a	11a	"Disaster of Puppets"	Alex Almaguer	Written by : Nate Federman; Storyboarded by : Fred Gonzales & Max Lawson	August 26, 2016
Thunk becomes a ventriloquist, but he feels like the puppet is getting more credit than he is.
24b	11b	"Love Will Eep Us Together"	Crystal Chesney-Thompson	Written by : Matthew Beans; Storyboarded by : Mike Nassar & Ed Tadem	August 26, 2016
Grug and Ugga forbid Eep from dating, so she compensates this by reuniting two lovesick buffalippos.
25a	12a	"The Tide is Nigh"	Alex Almaguer	Written by : Caitlin Meares; Storyboarded by : Max Lawson & David Scott Smith	August 26, 2016
Eep becomes a death-guard at the watering hole and just when she sees that it's not what she expected, the watering hole dries up.
25b	12b	"Rain Grain"	Alex Almaguer	Written by : Jason Reich; Storyboarded by : Fred Gonzales & Max Lawson	August 26, 2016
Gran fools everybody into thinking she can control the weather while Thunk gets 'Cave Brain' while waiting for the rain to stop.
26	13	"Dawn of the Broods"	Crystal Chesney-Thompson & Brian Hatfield	Written by : Matthew Beans & Brendan Hay & Caitlin Meares & Mike Yank; Storyboarded by : John Eddings, Ed Tadem, Allan Jacobsen & Gus Corrales	August 26, 2016
When Grug gets fed up with the hardships Ahhh! Valley brings, he takes his family on a vacation to the wilderness where they meet a seemingly nice family.

=== Season 3 (2017) ===
No. overall	No. in season	Title	Directed by	Written by	Original release date
27	1	"It Takes Ahhh! Valley"	Crystal Chesney-Thompson & Brian Hatfield	Written by : Matthew Beans & Brendan Hay & Caitlin Meares & Mike Yank; Storyboarded by : Marcelo de Souza, John Eddings, Allan Jacobsen & Mike Nassar	April 7, 2017
After finding their way out of a creature's stomach, the Croods return to Aaahh! Valley to stop the Broods from taking over.
28a	2a	"Deus Ex Monkhuahua"	Alex Almaguer	Written by : Matthew Beans; Storyboarded by : Max Lawson	April 7, 2017
Grug has his first day as leader of Ahhh! Valley, and a new family pet makes Sandy jealous.
28b	2b	"Slak Attack"	Alex Almaguer	Written by : Mike Yank; Storyboarded by : Fred Gonzales & David Scott Smith	April 7, 2017
Eep and Thunk try out a new, lazy lifestyle.
29a	3a	"Gorgey Girl"	Brian Hatfield & Allan Jacobsen	Written by : Mike Yank; Storyboarded by : Max Lawson	April 7, 2017
Eep finds a mysterious pen pal to share her feelings with. Meanwhile, Thunk's pet Not Food feels jealous over Thunk's other pet. In the end, it's revealed that the pen pal was Guy.
29b	3b	"A Gran Adventure"	Alex Almaguer	Written by : Caitlin Meares; Storyboarded by : Max Lawson	April 7, 2017
Gran reveals she's hidden a treasure guarded by booby traps, and Eep sets off to find it.
30a	4a	"127 Owwws"	Seung Cha	Written by : Nate Federman; Storyboarded by : Sang-Il Shim, Kyungwon Yim & Kahee Lim	April 7, 2017
While giving Eep and Thunk a lesson on self-reliance, Grug suffers a mishap that tests his will to survive. Meanwhile when Gran takes Not Food to play with his buds, she falls in love with a man.
30b	4b	"28 Fleas Later"	Crystal Chesney-Thompson	Written by : Caitlin Meares; Storyboarded by : Sang-Il Shim, Kyungwon Yim & Kahee Lim	April 7, 2017
Grug's plan for revenge against the Broods unleashes a swarm of super bugs on the valley.
31a	5a	"To Squawk with Love"	Brian Hatfield	Story by : Brendan Hay; Written by : Matthew Beans, Brendan Hay, Caitlin Meares & Mike Yank; Storyboarded by : Allan Jacobsen	April 7, 2017
Squawk's students try to add some fun into his dreary life.
31b	5b	"Lerk Was The Night"	Crystal Chesney-Thompson	Written by : Mike Yank; Storyboarded by : Mike Nassar	April 7, 2017
When the Broods steal the valley's food supply, it's up to Eep and Lerk to get it back.
32a	6a	"The Flawed Couple"	Crystal Chesney-Thompson	Written by : Caitlin Meares; Storyboarded by : Ed Tadem	April 7, 2017
To help get the valley's work done, Grug pairs every adult with a child trainee.
32b	6b	"Go-Sip Girl"	Alex Almaguer	Written by : Nate Federman; Storyboarded by : Fred Gonzales	April 7, 2017
Ugga joins the "nitting" club, but has trouble fitting in.
33a	7a	"Munk History"	Alex Almaguer	Story by : Brendan Hay; Written by : Nate Federman, Brendan Hay, Caitlin Meares & Mike Yank; Storyboarded by : Fred Gonzales	April 7, 2017
Munk reports his family missing, so Grug takes it upon himself as valley leader to find them.
33b	7b	"Happy Howl Day"	Brian Hatfield	Written by : Nate Federman; Storyboarded by : Allan Jacobsen	April 7, 2017
The residents of Ahhh! Valley celebrate Howl Day.
34	8	"Snooty and the Beasts"	Brian Hatfield & Alex Almaguer	Written by : Mike Yank; Storyboarded by : Gus Corrales, Marcelo de Souza & Max Lawson	April 7, 2017
When the Big Chickuna invades the valley, all the residents evacuate to safety, except for Bulk, whose rescue becomes a contest between Grug and Snoot.
35a	9a	"Zero Dark Thunky"	Crystal Chesney-Thompson	Written by : Matthew Beans; Storyboarded by : Ed Tadem	April 7, 2017
While he and Eep are held captive for ransom by the Broods, Thunk finds his soulmate.
35b	9b	"Pie vs. Pie"	Seung Cha	Written by : Mike Yank; Storyboarded by : Sang-Il Kim, Kyungwon Yim, Kahee Lim & Chulsoo Lee	April 7, 2017
Ugga and Thunk accidentally invent a new type of food called a "meatzza", and go into business, but end up attracting a competitor: Amber.
36a	10a	"Super Smash Siblings"	Brian Hatfield	Written by : Nate Federman; Storyboarded by : Marcelo de Souza	April 7, 2017
Eep realizes that Thunk's softheartedness makes him the perfect partner to win a cutthroat game.
36b	10b	"A Hole in Grug"	Crystal Chesney-Thompson	Written by : Matthew Beans; Storyboarded by : Mike Nassar	April 7, 2017
Grug invents a sport that he hopes will earn him a spot on the Wall of Fame.
37a	11a	"Bait with Destiny"	Brian Hatfield	Written by : Caitlin Meares; Storyboarded by : Marcelo de Souza	April 7, 2017
Thunk demonstrates an unexpected talent that lands him a new job.
37b	11b	"Sappy Together"	Crystal Chesney-Thompson	Story by : Alex Fox, Rachel Lewis; Written by : Matthew Beans, Brendan Hay, Caitlin Meares, Mike Yank; Storyboarded by : Ed Tadem	April 7, 2017
A Sticky situation forces Grug to accept Gran as his hunting partner.
38a	12a	"Scare Tactics"	Crystal Chesney-Thompson	Written by : Matthew Beans; Storyboarded by : Mike Nassar	April 7, 2017
Grug uses fear to get the residents to accept defense measures against the Broods.
38b	12b	"DisturbiAHHH!"	Seung Cha	Written by : Caitlin Meares; Storyboarded by : Sung-Il Shim, Kyungwon Yim, Kahee Lim & Chulsoo Lee	April 7, 2017
While laid up with an injury, Eep witnesses a suspicious encounter.
39a	13a	"Thunk O' Clock High"	Seung Cha	Written by : Matthew Beans; Storyboarded by : Sang-Il Shim, Kyungwon Yim & Kahee Lim	April 7, 2017
A new liyote in the neighborhood targets Thunk for bullying.
39b	13b	"The Croo-gitive"	Alex Almaguer	Written by : Matthew Beans, Nate Federman, Brendan Hay, Mike Yank; Storyboarded by : Fred Gonzales	April 7, 2017
When Grug is imprisoned for a crime he didn't commit, he must escape to clear his name.

=== Season 4 (2017) ===
No. overall	No. in season	Title	Directed by	Written by	Original release date
40a	1a	"A Few Good Grugs"	Brian Hatfield & Allan Jacobsen	Written by : Matthew Beans, Brendan Hay, Caitlin Meares & Mike Yank; Storyboarded by : Marcelo de Souza	July 7, 2017
Accused of stealing the valley's food stash, the Croods are allowed a "try-all" to prove their innocence.
40b	1b	"Valley Shine Day"	Alex Almaguer	Written by : Nate Federman; Storyboarded by : Max Lawson	July 7, 2017
Kevin gives Thunk tips on attracting girls. Note: This episode is dedicated to color stylist, Shawnee Holt, who died a month before its fourth season release.
41a	2a	"Chalk the Line"	Allan Jacobsen	Written by : Nate Federman; Storyboarded by : Gus Corrales	July 7, 2017
Eep tricks her parents into letting her go to a grown-up party.
41b	2b	"Weighing Is the Hardest Part"	Crystal Chesney-Thompson	Written by : Matthew Beans; Storyboarded by : Ed Tadem	July 7, 2017
To win back the title of Hefty Hunter, Grug seeks the help of a personal trainer.
42a	3a	"Wrestlebabia: The Musical"	Crystal Chesney-Thompson	Written by : Mike Yank; Storyboarded by : Mike Nassar	July 7, 2017
Sandy expresses her frustrations about being treated like a baby by breaking into song.
42b	3b	"Flowers for Munk"	Seung Cha	Written by : Nate Federman; Storyboarded by : Sang-Il Shim, Kyungwon Yim, Kyungsoo Lee & Kahee Lim	July 7, 2017
Grug helps Munk get his job back with an IQ-boosting worm.
43a	4a	"They Might Be Sky Giants"	Allan Jacobsen	Written by : Jeff D'Elia & Brendan Hay; Storyboarded by : Marcelo de Souza	July 7, 2017
While unconscious, Eep has a life-changing vision.
43b	4b	"The Grugest Story Ever Told"	Crystal Chesney-Thompson	Written by : Matthew Beans & Nate Federman; Storyboarded by : Mike Nassar & Ed Tadem	July 7, 2017
Afraid he's no longer respected as valley leader, Grug enlists Thunk to perform his life story.
44a	5a	"Worms of Endearment"	Seung Cha	Written by : Mike Yank; Storyboarded by : Sang-Il Shim, Kyungwon Yim, Kyungsoo Lee, Kahee Lim & Jaewoo Kim	July 7, 2017
Lerk's plan to save her worm playmates from becoming bait spirals out of control.
44b	5b	"Dr. StrangeGrug or How I Learned to Stop Worrying and Love the Spear"	Alex Almaguer	Written by : Tesha Kondrat; Storyboarded by : Max Lawson	July 7, 2017
Grug introduces his new invention to Ahhh! Valley: the spear.
45	6a	"Tunnel of Terror"	Seung Cha	Written by : Nate Federman; Storyboarded by : Sang-Il Shim, Kyungwon Yim, Kyungsoo Lee, Kahee Lim & Jaewoo Kim	July 7, 2017
Eep drags her friends into Ahhh! Valley's Tunnel of Terror to see if it lives up to its name.
45b	6b	"Creature from the Crood Lagoon"	Crystal Chesney-Thompson	Written by : Caitlin Meares; Storyboarded by : Mike Nassar	July 7, 2017
A mysterious creature saves Thunk from drowning.
46	7	"Voice Fail"	Alex Almaguer & Allan Jacobsen	Story by : Brendan Hay; Written by : Matthew Beans, Nate Federman, Brendan Hay & Mike Yank; Storyboarded by : Marcelo de Souza & Fred Gonzales	July 7, 2017
When Grug loses his commanding voice, he and Ugga search for it. Meanwhile, Eep gets carried away while acting as the valley leader's spokesperson.
47a	8a	"Punch-Thunk Love"	Alex Almaguer	Written by : Caitlin Meares; Storyboarded by : Fabien Tong	July 7, 2017
After finding out Thunk is in love with Blurg Brood, Eep tries to interest him in a new girl.
47b	8b	"Nay Boors"	Seung Cha	Written by : Nate Federman; Storyboarded by : Sang-Il Shim, Kyungwon Yim, Kyungsoo Lee & Kahee Lim	July 7, 2017
Ugga attempts to drive away selfish neighbor Snoot.
48a	9a	"Caverns and Creepers"	Alex Almaguer	Written by : Jeff D'Elia; Storyboarded by : Fred Gonzales	July 7, 2017
Eep's love of competition and destruction ruins Thunk's teamwork-based game.
48b	9b	"Red Teacher"	Seung Cha	Written by : Sam Riegel; Storyboarded by : Sang-Il Shim, Kyungwon Yim, Kyungsoo Lee & Kahee Lim	July 7, 2017
Squawk gets fired and is replaced by a very different kind of teacher.
49a	10a	"Grug's First Chance"	Crystal Chesney-Thompson	Written by : Matthew Beans; Storyboarded by : Ed Tadem	July 7, 2017
Grug stumbles on an easy way to solve feuds as valley leader.
49b	10b	"Furry Road"	Allan Jacobsen	Written by : Mike Yank; Storyboarded by : Gus Corrales	July 7, 2017
Thunk narrates a documentary on one of Ahhh! Valley's many creatures: the bearowl.
50a	11a	"My Big Fat Gran Wedding"	Crystal Chesney-Thompson	Written by : Caitlin Meares; Storyboarded by : Mike Nassar	July 7, 2017
To win a bet, Gran decides to marry Mow.
50b	11b	"The Strutting Edge"	Allan Jacobsen	Ari Berkowitz	July 7, 2017
Ahhh! Valley's kids compete in the Beasty Pageant to see who best poses, calls and struts like an animal.
51a	12a	"Can't Hardly Bait"	Alex Almaguer	Written by : Caitlin Meares; Storyboarded by : Fred Gonzales	July 7, 2017
To graduate with their pals, Thunk and Womp take Squawk's crash course.
51b	12b	"Crood Detente"	Seung Cha	Written by : Mike Yank; Storyboarded by : Sang-Il Shim, Kyungwon Yim, Kyungsoo Lee & Kahee Lim	July 7, 2017
Without asking the other residents, Grug makes a peace deal with the Broods.
52	13	"This Is an End"	Alex Almaguer, Crystal Chesney-Thompson & Allan Jacobsen	Written by : Nate Federman, Brendan Hay, Caitlin Meares & Mike Yank; Storyboarded by : Gus Corrales, Marcelo de Souza & Fabien Tong	July 7, 2017
A fast-approaching asteroid headed toward Ahhh! Valley leads the residents to make hasty moving plans, but Grug insists he can defend their homeland.
