= Bandbudh Aur Budbak =

Indian animated TV series produced by Paperboat Animation Studio

- Genre: Comedy
- Voices of: Pooja Punjabi; Sonal Kaushal
- Country of origin: India
- Original language: Hindi
- No. of episodes: 156 (list of episodes)

Production
- Producers: Aashish Mall; Mayank Patel; Avinash Walzade
- Running time: 10–12 minutes
- Production company: Paperboat Animation Studios

Original release
- Network: ZeeQ
- Release: 13 February 2015 – 11 October 2017

Bandbudh Aur Budbak (transl. Dumb and Idiot) is an Indian animated comedy television series produced by Aashish Mall, Mayank Patel and Avinash Walzade. It was also produced by Paperboat Animation Studios. It originally premiered on ZeeQ in 2015. It showcases the antics and school life of two naughty friends named Badrinath and Budhdeb.

== Characters ==
=== Main ===
- Badrinath "Badri": Badrinath is one of the main characters of the show. He is smart and comes up with many ideas to outsmart others to get what he wants. He is loyal to his friendship with Budhdeb and hates studying and going to school, known as Apna School. He mostly plays Mega Robot, a space game where he challenges aliens. His hair is messy, and he is short. He is voiced by Pooja Punjabi.
- Budhdeb "Budh": Budhdeb is the other main character of the show. Budhdeb is loyal to his friendship with Badri and hates studying and going to school, just like Badrinath. He always utters Ekdum Lallantaap!! (transl. Very Fantastic!), Even Badrinath utters the phrase sometimes. Like Badrinath, he also mostly plays Mega Robot. He is voiced by Sonal Kaushal.

=== Supporting ===
- Jeeva: Jeeva is the fattest boy in the class who has a long nose. He talks with a lisp. He sometimes bullies Badrinath and Budhdeb as they make fun of him. He considers himself very strong, but actually, he is a cowardly boy. He is the favourite student of Dubey sir, their class teacher.
- Gyan Singh: Gyan is the most intelligent student in the class. He always gets first position in the class, so he's the class topper. he wears a turban.
- Sabina: Sabina is the monitor of the class. She is very responsible and wears glasses. She is Gyan's best friend.
- Karan: Karan is an NRI and thus speaks with an accent. He always boasts about things that his father brings for him from foreign countries (mainly from the USA and London).
- Maira and Saira: Maira and Saira are siblings. They are the prettiest girls in the school. They are very stylish and talk English most of the time. They love to talk about movies. They are always aware of what's happening around the school, Apna School.
- Mukesh, Ganesh and Ramesh: Mukesh, Ganesh & Ramesh are triplets. They are identical to each other. They all wear glasses.
- Dubey: Dubey Ji is the class teacher of Badri and Budh's class. He is very obese and lazy. he always punishes Badrinath and Budhdeb by making them murga (transl. Rooster) whenever they act worse in the school.
- Makkhan Singh Rathi (Rathi sir): Makkhan Singh Rathi is the principal of Apna School. He has a tall and thin frame. He loves trophies and urges students to get trophies for the school. He comes to school in a yellow-colored car. His dialogue is Aakhir Principal Hai Hum (transl. After All I'm The Principal). He saves Badrinath and Budhdeb from getting punished, mostly by Dubey sir.
- Bindiya Roy: Bindiya Roy is the art teacher of the school. She wears glasses. She often says Khub Bhalo (transl. Very Good).
- Patel: Patel is the peon of the school. He is quite lazy. He sometimes gets tricked by Badrinath and Budhdeb.
- Patil: Patil is the security guard of the school. He is sincere and responsible. He is seen as very active.
- Yogiraj Ji: Yogiraj Ji, also known as Yoginath Ji, is the yoga teacher of Apna School. He has long hair and a beard like any traditional Hindu sage. He is a parody of Ramdev.
- Krishnan Sir: Krishnan Sir is the lab assistant and Science teacher of Apna School. He is sincere, intelligent, and responsible. He often does some experiments that are admirable, but Badri and Budh cause trouble using them sometimes.
- Cinderella: Cinderella is a buffalo. Badrinath and Budhdeb often bump into her when they don't ride their cycle carefully, but she doesn't react in any way to them. They mostly meet her in a river, which is their favourite spot to pass the time.

=== Others ===
- Librarian: She is an anonymous female teacher. She is in charge of the library and teaches Hindi to the class, as shown in the episode Angrezi Ka Aakraman. Her name is not mentioned.
- Kaala Kaboola: Jaadugar Kaala Kaboola is an evil magician whose main intention is to hypnotise everyone while performing his tricks and then loot them.
- Principal Rana: Rana is the principal of another school in Apna Nagar.
- Pahari Lal: Pahari Lal is a civilian of Apna Nagar. He builds a living inside the Apna School with his wife, claiming that a part of the land used to build the Apna School belongs to his grandfather.
- Officer Waghmare: Waghmare is a police officer of the Chhota Chowki Police Station in Apna Nagar.
- Chhota Manjan: Chhota Manjan is a thief.
- Munna Mobile: Munna Mobile is a deputy officer of Waghmare.
- Duggabati: He is a thief living in the fort visited by Apna School Students.
- Rockit: Rockit is the name of Badrinath and Budhdeb's bicycle. It is red, and they always arrive at school and go anywhere on it. They both love Rockit.
- Bablu Ustara: He is a Nai (Barber) of Apna Nagar.

== Broadcast ==
The show was originally released on ZeeQ on 13 February 2015. Later, it aired on Discovery Kids from February 2018 to 2019. It also aired on Big Magic. From 18 April 2020, it was telecasted on Cartoon Network. In July 2021, the series was also broadcast by Pogo TV. After 9 long years, on 18 September 2026, ZEE5 released a new version of this show, titled Bandbudh Aur Budbak 2.0, as part of its KidZ original animated series.

== See also ==
- List of Indian animated television series
