= Leo the Wildlife Ranger =

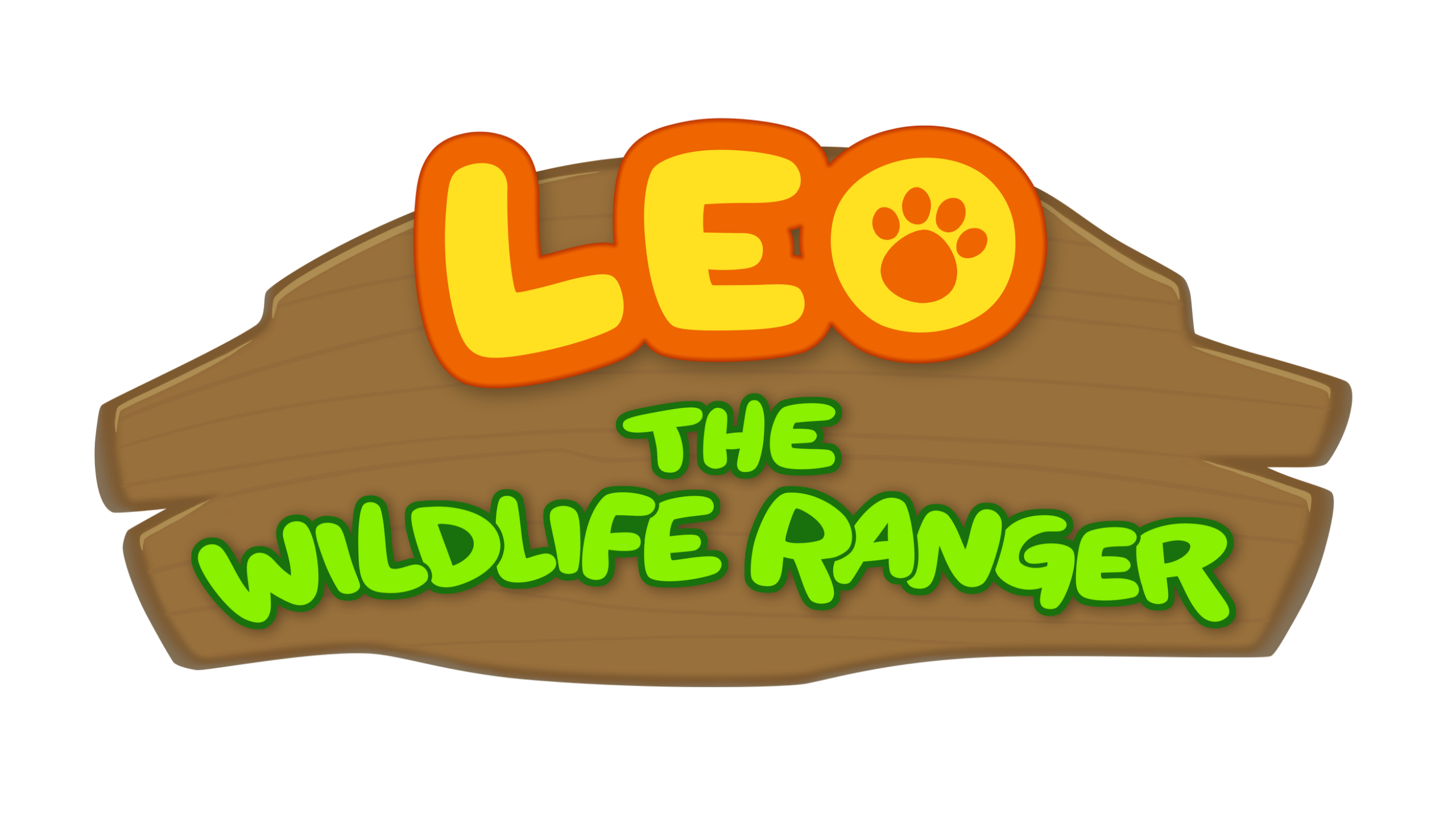
- The official logos of the series season 1
- Also known as: Leo, El Explorador (Spanish); Leo Si Penjaga Alam (Malay/Indonesian)
- Genre: Children's animated series; Educational; Adventure
- Created by: Omens Studios
- Directed by: Sacha Goedegebure; Yvonne Ng
- Voices of: Su-Ping Chio — Leo; Hillary Blazer-Doyle — Katie; Joe Murray (Season 1) & Marlon Dance-Hooi (Season 2 – present) — Ranger Rocky; Noella Menon — Kai & Jane; Timothy Banfield — Kyle; Kelsey Painter — Farah; Sofia Narváez — Peyo; Nadia Ramlee — Zari; Tiara Jane Anchant (live‑action, Season 2 Singapore Edition) & Su Ling Chan (Season 3 – present) — Ranger Joey
- Theme music composer: August Lum
- Opening theme: "Leo the Wildlife Ranger Theme"
- Country of origin: Singapore
- Original languages: English; Malay; Indonesian
- No. of seasons: 5
- No. of episodes: 166

Production
- Running time: 11–22 minutes
- Production company: Omens Studios

Original release
- Network: MediaCorp Okto; ZooMoo
- Release: October 26, 2015 – present

Leo the Wildlife Ranger (also known as Leo, El Explorador; Malay/Indonesian: Leo Si Penjaga Alam) is a Singaporean children's animated series that fosters awareness and appreciation of the diversity of wildlife and natural habitats around the world. Produced by Omens Studios, the series follows Leo, Katie, their dog Hero, and the rest of the Junior Ranger team on exciting adventures across the globe — exploring exotic locations and learning fun facts about animals and nature. The show's primary goal is to inspire viewers to appreciate, learn about, and protect wildlife and their natural environments.

== Synopsis ==
Leo, Katie, and their puppy Hero are Junior Rangers who travel the world on missions to help animals, rescue wildlife in need, and learn about nature and conservation. Under the guidance of Ranger Rocky, they explore different habitats, meet fascinating animals, and discover interesting facts about the natural world. Joined by new team members — Kai, Kyle, Peyo, Farah, Jane, Zari, and Jayden — the Junior Rangers work together to protect wildlife everywhere.

== Cast and Characters ==
=== Main ===
- Leo — Voiced by Su‑Ping Chio (English); Harris Alif (Malay); Halilintar Maha Putra Edi Morgen (Indonesian). The brave and curious leader of the Junior Rangers.
- Katie — Voiced by Hillary Blazer‑Doyle (English); Dayana Amerda (Malay); Latifa Pamela Ghaniya (Indonesian). Leo's younger sister and the team's smart, rational researcher.
- Hero — Leo's loyal dog and constant companion.
- Ranger Rocky — Voiced by Joe Murray (S1) & Marlon Dance‑Hooi (S2–present) (English); Alif Satar (Malay); Raffi Ahmad (S1–2) & Dave Hendrik (S2 Singapore Edition–present) (Indonesian). The team's mentor and wildlife expert.

=== Introduced in Season 2 ===
- Kai — Voiced by Noella Menon (S2) & Su Ling Chan (S3–present) (English); Azzam Sham (Malay); Alvin Jonathan (Indonesian). The team's inventor and technology specialist.
- Kyle — Voiced by Timothy Banfield (English); Afieq Shazwan (Malay); Bastian Steel (Indonesian). Predator and wildlife specialist; carries his kangaroo plushie, Stella.
- Peyo — Voiced by Sofia Narváez (English); Ben Ladin (Malay); Muhammad Difa Ryansyah (Indonesian). Botanist and nature lover; accompanied by his Toco Toucan, Pico.
- Farah — Voiced by Kelsey Painter (English); Didi Astillah (Malay); Salma Salsabil (Indonesian). The team's researcher and guidebook keeper.
- Jane — Voiced by Noella Menon (English); Angelica Paujin (Malay); Novia Bachmid (Indonesian). Big cat specialist; accompanied by her cheetah cub, Zumi.
- Zari — Voiced by Nadia Ramlee (English); Farisha Iris (Malay); Zahra Damariva (Indonesian). Introduced in the Singapore Special Edition; urban wildlife expert and musician.
- Ranger Joey — Live‑action portrayed by Tiara Jane Anchant (S2 Singapore Edition); voiced by Su Ling Chan (S3–present, English); Atilia Haron (Malay); Ayu Dewi (Indonesian). Wildlife Ranger and ally to the team.

=== Introduced in Season 3 ===
- Jayden — Voiced by Soraya Martin (English); Irfan Haris (Malay); Gabriel Stevent Damanik (Indonesian). Determined Junior Ranger with a prosthetic leg.

== Production ==
Leo the Wildlife Ranger is produced and distributed by Omens Studios, an animation studio based in Singapore. The series premiered on 26 October 2015 and has since aired for five seasons and 166 episodes.

== Broadcast ==
=== Singapore ===
- MediaCorp Okto
- ZooMoo

=== Malaysia ===
- TV9
- TV Alhijrah (Arabic version)

=== Indonesia ===
- RCTI
- MNCTV
- GTV
- Trans TV
- RTV
- SCTV
- Indosiar
- Miao Mi

=== Saudi Arabia ===
- Majid Kids TV
- Baraem TV

== Release ==
The series has been broadcast across multiple territories in Asia, the Middle East, and beyond, with localization in English, Malay, Indonesian, Arabic, and Spanish.
