= ZeeQ =

- Country: India
- Headquarters: Greater Noida

Programming
- Languages: English; Hindi; Telugu

Ownership
- Owner: Zee Entertainment Enterprises
- Sister channels: List: 9X &flix &Pictures &TV TEN Sports Zee Action Zee Anmol Cinema Zee Bollywood Zee Cinema Zee ETC Bollywood Zee Jagran Zee Next Zee Smile Zee Trendz Zee TV Zing Zee Studio Zee Café Zee Business Zee Hindustan Zee News Zee Bangla Zee Bangla Cinema Cinema Zee Odisha Zee Punjab Haryana Himachal Zee UP Zee Kannada Zee Keralam Zee Tamil Zee 24 Ghantalu Zee Telugu Zee 24 Kalak Zee Marathi Zee 24 Taas Zee 24 Ghante Chhattisgarh Zee Rajasthan Zee Talkies Zee Salaam Zee Aflam Zee Alwan Zee Next Zee Drama Zee World Zindagi

History
- Launched: 2 November 2012; 14 years ago
- Closed: 1 February 2017; 9 years ago

Zee Q was an Indian Hindi cable and satellite television channel, owned by Zee Entertainment Enterprises. The channel was launched on 22 November 2010, for children in the 4 to 14 age group. The 24-hour channel was available on DTH and digital cable platforms as a paid channel and aired in India. The channel provided children with educational broadcasts, animated and live-action series, and movies. The channel also featured a programming block of CBeebies shows.

== Former programming ==
=== Animated series ===
- 3rd & Bird
- Aayu
- Amar Chitra Katha Heroes
- Bandbudh Aur Budbak
- The Backyardigans
- Burka Avenger
- Bo On The Go!
- "The Cat in the Hat"
- Charlie and Lola
- Chimpoo Simpoo
- Daniel Tiger's Neighborhood
- Dinosaur Train
- Franklin
- "Family Guy"
- Fishtronaut
- He-Man and the Masters of the Universe
- Jack
- Pyaar Mohabbat Happy Lucky
- Rolie Polie Olie
- Sid the Science Kid
- Tree Fu Tom
- Zou

=== Live-action ===
- Engineer This
- M.I. Four – The Multiple Intelligence quiz
- Satrangi
- Science with Brain Cafe
- Teenovation
- Teletubbies
- The Art Room
- The Weekly Wrap
- Word Match
