= Pyaar Mohabbat Happy Lucky =

Indian animated TV series produced by Popcorn Animation Studios

- Genre: Animation, Comedy, Adventure
- Country of origin: India
- Original language: Hindi
- No. of seasons: 2
- No. of episodes: 129

Production
- Producer: Amit Gaur
- Running time: 6-7 minutes
- Production company: Popcorn Animation Studios

Original release
- Network: ZeeQ
- Release: 15 June 2014

Pyaar Mohabbat Happy Lucky is an Indian animated television series directed by Amit Gaur and produced by Popcorn Animation Studios. It aired on ZeeQ from 2014 to 2017. It depicts two neighbours, Happy and Lucky, who live in the countryside with Pappu, Bunty and Builder. There is a relationship between Happy and Lucky, and there are plenty of jokes and teasing between the two main characters.

== Characters ==
- Happy (Hindi: हैप्पी) is one of the two main characters. He is a purple raccoon who speaks Haryanvi (voiced by Manish Bhawan).
- Lucky (Hindi: लक्की) is the second main character. He is a pink raccoon (voiced by Anamaya Verma).
- Pappu (Hindi: पप्पू), also known as Pammi (Hindi: पम्मी) is the friend of Lucky. He is a yellow raccoon (voiced by Vaibhav Thakkar).
- Bunty (Hindi: बंटी) is a light-blue bull who speaks Punjabi.
- Tina (Hindi: टीना) is a light pink raccoon.

== See also ==
- List of Indian animated television series
