= Buddhist temples in Huế =

Buddhist temples in Huế have long been an important part of the city's consciousness. The city was founded during the Nam tiến southward expansion of Vietnam in the 16th century and Buddhism was introduced to the lands of the former territory of Champa, which was Hindu. The ruling Nguyễn lords were noted for their patronization of Buddhist temples in the city, something that continued during the Nguyễn dynasty that unified modern Vietnam. Huế was long regarded as a centre of Buddhist scholarship and consciousness in Vietnam, and in 1963, the temples of the city were at the centre of international attention when they were at the heart of the beginning of the Buddhist crisis, a series of protests against President Ngô Đình Diệm's religious discrimination. The temples were the base of Buddhist protests and government attacks, the result of which was a political crisis that precipitated a military coup that saw the deposal of Diem.

== Background ==
Buddhism was introduced to the area during the 16th century, during the southward expansion (Nam tiến) of the ethnic Vietnamese people under the Lê dynasty. Prior to this, Đại Việt, the predecessor of modern Vietnam, had been mainly restricted to northern Vietnam, particularly the Red River Delta. During the times of the Trần dynasty, Đại Việt made repeated raids south into modern day central Vietnam, which was then the location of the Kingdom of Champa, which was a Hindu culture. However, the Vietnamese were unable to gain a conclusive result over the Cham, who often fought back and reclaimed territory. The border was often shifted back and forth, and in one instance, the Champa under Chế Bồng Nga managed to raid and attack Hanoi in the late 14th century.

Đại Việt began to gain ascendancy with rise of the Lê dynasty in 1428, which saw a rise in the military strength of the country. Emperor Lê Thánh Tông, regarded as one of the greatest in Vietnamese history, led a 1471 Vietnamese invasion of Champa, which resulted in a decisive victory, with large numbers of prisoners and land captured. The conquest signalled the end of Champa as a military threat to Đại Việt, and over time, the remnants of Champa were whittled down by further acquisition of land. This set forth the gradual process of Vietnamese migration south into the new territory, and the modern city of Huế began its life as Thuận Hóa in the 16th century, when Nguyễn Hoàng, the leader of the Nguyễn Lords took up a post as Governor of Thuận Hóa, and built up the city.

The Nguyễn lords and the Vietnamese that followed them south brought with them Buddhism into a hitherto Hindu area, and the rulers were known for their patronisation of the Buddhism, in particular with their funding of the construction and recognition of many historic temples in the city. They also recruited and invited Buddhist monks from China to set up temples and religious congregations in the area to expound the dharma.

== Buddhist crisis ==
The city was long regarded as a centre of Buddhist scholarship in Vietnam, and in 1963, the temples and Buddhist centres of Huế were the scene of activism among the local population during the summer, which was the subject of a nationwide political crisis known as the Buddhist crisis. At the time, the city was part of South Vietnam.

South Vietnam's Buddhist majority had long been discontented with the rule of President Ngô Đình Diệm since his rise to power in 1955. Diem had shown strong favouritism towards his fellow Catholics and discrimination against Buddhists in the army, public service and distribution of government aid. In the countryside, Catholics were de facto exempt from performing corvée labour and in some rural areas, Catholic priests led private armies against Buddhist villages. Discontent with Diem exploded into mass protest in Huế during the summer of 1963 when nine Buddhists died at the hand of Diem's army and police on Vesak, the birthday of Gautama Buddha. In May 1963, a law against the flying of religious flags was selectively invoked; the Buddhist flag was banned from display on Vesak while the Vatican flag was displayed to celebrate the anniversary of the consecration of Archbishop Ngô Đình Thục, Diem's brother. The Buddhists defied the ban and a protest that began with a march starting from Từ Đàm Pagoda to the government broadcasting station was ended when government forces opened fire. As a result, Buddhist protests were held across the country and steadily grew in size, asking for the signing of a Joint Communique to end religious inequality. The pagodas was a major organising point for the Buddhist movement and was often the location of hunger strikes, barricades and protests.

As the tension increased and opposition to Diem increased, the key turning point came shortly after midnight on August 21, when Ngô Đình Nhu's Special Forces raided and vandalised Buddhist pagodas across the country, rounding up thousands of monks and leaving hundreds dead.

Across Huế, the approach of government forces were met by the beating of Buddhist drums and cymbals to alert the populace. The townsfolk left their homes in the middle of the night in an attempt to defend the city's pagodas. At Tu Dam Pagoda, monks attempted to burn the coffin of a monk who had self-immolated during previous protests. Government soldiers, firing M1 rifles, overran the pagoda and confiscated the coffin. They also demolished a statue of Gautama Buddha and looted and vandalized the pagoda. An explosion was set off by the troops, which leveled much of the pagoda. Many Buddhists were shot or clubbed to death.

The most determined resistance to the Diem regime occurred outside the Diệu Đế Pagoda. As troops attempted to stretch a barbed wire barricade across the bridge leading to the pagoda, a large crowd of pro-Buddhist laypeople and anti-government protesters tore it down with their bare hands. The crowd then fought the heavily armed military personnel with rocks, sticks and their bare fists, throwing back the tear gas grenades that were aimed at them. After a five-hour battle, the military finally won control of the bridge at dawn by driving armored cars through the angry crowd. The defense of the bridge and Diệu Đế had left an estimated 30 dead and 200 wounded. Ten truckloads of bridge defenders were taken to jail and an estimated 500 people were arrested in the city. The total number of dead and disappearances was never confirmed, but estimates range up to several hundred.

After the deposal of Diem, the temple later became the centre of anti-American and anti-war protests by Buddhists and students against the Vietnam War. During a period of chaos and protest in 1966, the temple was stormed by police and the army under General Tôn Thất Đính, who had been sent in by Prime Minister Nguyễn Cao Kỳ to quell the anti-government protests. Many monks were arrested, along with their supporters and student protesters. The equipment that the protesters used, such as radio, were confiscated.

== Notable temples ==
=== Thiên Mụ Temple ===
Thiên Mụ Temple, with its seven storied pagoda, the tallest in Vietnam, is often the subject of folk rhymes and ca dao about Huế, such is its iconic status and association with the city. It is regarded as the unofficial symbol of the former imperial capital. The temple was built in 1601 at the direction of Nguyễn Hoàng, the head of the Nguyễn Lords. According to the royal annals, Hoang was on a sightseeing trip and holiday to see the seas and mountains of the local area when he passed by the hill which is now the site of the Thiên Mụ Temple. He heard of a local legend, in which an old lady, known as Thiên Mụ (literally "fairy woman"), wearing a red shirt and blue trousers, sat at the site, rubbing her cheeks. She said that a lord would come to the hill and erect a temple to pray for the country' prosperity. According to the local legend, the lady vanished after making her prophecy. When Hoàng heard this, he ordered the construction of a temple at the site and it was called Thiên Mụ Tự.

Phước Duyên Pagoda, Thiên Mụ Temple

Thiên Mụ has been expanded many times over the years, and in 1710, the ruling lord Nguyễn Phúc Chu funded the casting of a giant bell, which weighs 3285 kg, and was regarded as one of the most prized cultural relics of its time in Vietnam. The bell is said to be audible 10 km away and has been the subject of many poems and songs, including one by Emperor Thiệu Trị of the Nguyễn dynasty who ruled in the 1840s. Emperor Thiệu Trị, erected the Từ Nhân Pagoda in 1844, which is now known as the Phước Duyên Pagoda. The brick pagoda stands 21 m and is of octagonal shape and has seven stories, each of which is dedicated to a different Buddha. The pagoda has stood there since, overlooking the Perfume River, and has become synonymous with the landscape of Huế and the Perfume River. Its impact is such that it has become the unofficial symbol of the city.

=== Từ Đàm Temple ===
Từ Đàm Temple was built and opened under the direction of Thiền master Thích Minh Hoằng, who was the 34th in the lineage of the Lâm Tế Zen lineage. In 1841, Vietnam had been unified in its modern state by the Nguyễn dynasty and Emperor Thiệu Trị ordered that the temple be renamed so that it did not conflict with his name. The temple was one of the three national pagodas in Huế during the Nguyễn dynasty era.

In 1939, Suzanne Karpelès, Secretary General of the Buddhist Studies Association of Phnom Penh in Cambodia, arranged for a bodhi tree offshoot to be taken from the original bodhi tree in Bodh Gaya under which Gautama Buddha achieved enlightenment, to be brought to Từ Đàm Pagoda. It was planted in the front yard of the temple, where it was grown up and become a permanent fixture. In 1951, the temple was the venue for a meeting of 51 notable Buddhist monks from across Vietnam, to create a unified nationwide Buddhist organisation for all of Vietnam. At this meeting Thích Tịnh Khiết was chosen to be the head of Buddhism in Vietnam. It was during this meeting that the internationally designed Buddhist flag was first flown on the grounds of the pagoda.

During 1968, the pagoda was heavily damaged during the Tet Offensive of the Vietnam War, some of which remains unrepaired. In 1966, a bronze statue of Gautama Buddha was cast to replace the one destroyed during the pagoda attacks of Diem's regime.

=== Diệu Đế Temple ===
During the period of the Nguyễn dynasty in the 19th century, Emperor Thiệu Trị declared Diệu Đế Temple to be one of the national pagodas of Vietnam. The temple entrance is on the banks of the Dong Ba canal. The temple gates face southwest; directly on the other side of the canal is the Dong Ba gate of the eastern side of the Citadel of Huế, which was the imperial headquarters of the Nguyễn dynasty, erected by Gia Long at the start of the 19th century.

=== Báo Quốc Temple ===
Báo Quốc Temple was one of the three national temples of the city during the time of the Nguyễn dynasty. It is located on Báo Quốc Street, in the ward of Phường Đúc in Huế . It lies on the southern side of the Perfume River and is approximately one kilometre west of the city centre. The temple is located on a small hill named Hàm Long and a spring from the top of the hill flows down into the grounds of the temple. Bao Quoc Temple was founded in 1670 by Zen master Thích Giác Phong, a Buddhist monk from China. During the era of the Nguyễn dynasty, which was founded in 1802 by Emperor Gia Long, the pagoda was frequently renovated and expanded. In 1808, Empress Hiếu Khương, wife of Gia Long, patronized various construction projects, that included the construction of a triple gate, the casting of a large bell and a gong. In 1824, Emperor Minh Mạng, the son of Gia Long, visited the temple and changed its name to its present title. He held the imperial celebration for his 40th birthday at the temple in 1830. Inside some relics of Gautama Buddha are enshrined.

=== Phổ Lại Temple ===
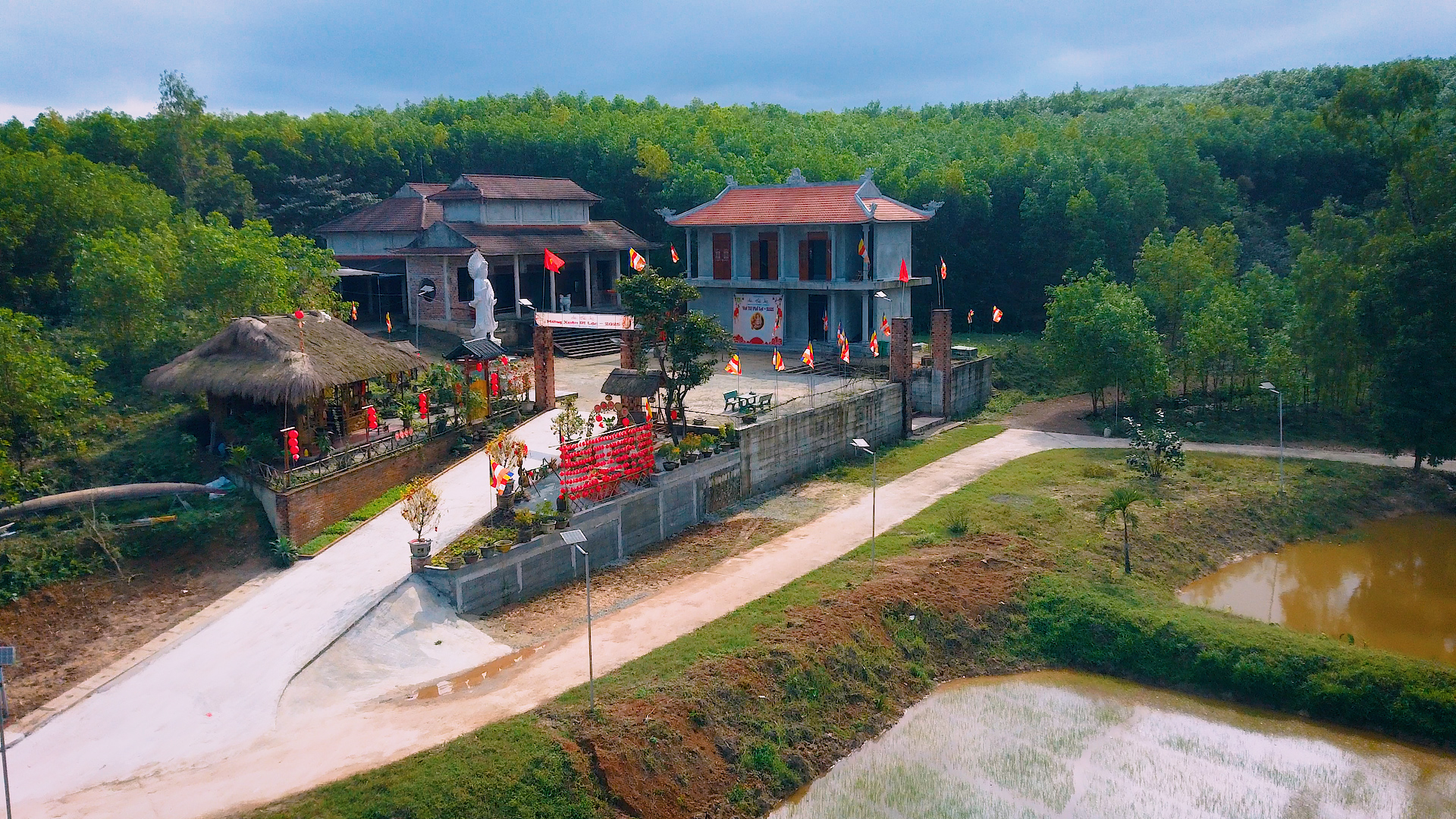
Chùa Phổ Lại in Phong Thái Ward, Huế City, Vietnam

Phổ Lại Temple (Chùa Phổ Lại) is a Buddhist temple located in Phong Thái ward, Huế, Vietnam. Established in 2016, it originated as a small Pho Lai Buddhist recitation hall (Niệm Phật đường Phổ Lại) and later developed into a monastic complex serving the midland area of central Huế. The temple is associated with the Vietnamese Buddhist monk Thích Trung Hiếu, who has been involved in its development and activities.

Situated on elevated terrain amid woodland surroundings, the temple serves as both a place of religious practice and a center for cultural and community activities. In addition to daily Buddhist rituals and meditation, it has organized charitable initiatives, including educational support for students, seasonal community events, and disaster relief efforts in response to flooding in central Vietnam.

Since its establishment, the temple has gradually expanded its facilities, including the construction of a main hall, meditation spaces, and outdoor areas for spiritual and cultural use. Its development reflects the contemporary role of Buddhist institutions in Vietnam in integrating religious practice with social engagement. Activities of the temple have been reported in Vietnamese media, highlighting its contributions to community support and cultural preservation in the midland region of Huế.
