= China: Time of Xi =

- Traditional Chinese: 習近平治國方略：中國這五年
- Simplified Chinese: 习近平治国方略：中国这五年
- Hanyu Pinyin: Xí Jìnpíng Zhìguó Fāngluè: Zhōngguó Zhè Wǔnián
- Genre: Documentary
- Directed by: John Moulson
- Country of origin: United States
- Original language: English
- No. of episodes: 3

Production
- Executive producers: Liz Mclecd; Inky Wang
- Production location: China
- Cinematography: Adam Vardy; Brian Mcdairmant
- Editors: Kenny Png; Helen Richmond
- Production company: Meridian Line Films for Discovery Networks Asia-Pacific Pte. Ltd

Original release
- Network: Discovery Asia
- Release: October 14 – October 16, 2017

China: Time of Xi (Chinese: 习近平治国方略：中国这五年) is a documentary television series that aired on Discovery Asia television stations in the United States. Airing over 3 consecutive days, the documentary television series examines Xi Jinping, General Secretary of the Chinese Communist Party and what drives Xi Jinping himself. China: Time of Xi was hosted by Danny Forster, DR. Jordan Nguyen and Mary-Ann Ochota. The documentary was a product of a three-year content deal between Discovery Asia and the China Intercontinental Communications Center.

== Episodes ==
No.	Title	Original release date
1	"People's Republic" (人民情怀)	October 14, 2017
Kiwi-growing farmer: Shi Pazhuan (石爬专); A taxi driver in bustling Beijing; A young girl with a passion for football and big dreams; A small-town shopkeeper
2	"Running China Now" (大国治理)	October 15, 2017
Unmanned Aerial Vehicle
3	"All Aboard" (合作共赢)	October 16, 2017
Mombasa–Nairobi Standard Gauge Railway; One Belt One Road Initiative
