= Asian Food Network =

Pan-Asian television channel

- Country: Singapore
- Broadcast area: Hong Kong; Taiwan; Mongolia; Southeast Asia
- Headquarters: 21 Media Circle, #08-01, Infinite Studios, Singapore 138562

Programming
- Languages: English (Malaysia, Philippines, Singapore & Hong Kong); Chinese (Mandarin/Cantonese) (Mainland China, Hong Kong, Macau, Taiwan, Singapore & Malaysia); Japanese (Japan); Korean (South Korea); Indonesian (Indonesia); Malay (Malaysia & Singapore); Thai (Thailand); Filipino (Philippines); Vietnamese (Vietnam)
- Picture format: 1080i HDTV

Ownership
- Owner: Skydance Asia-Pacific, Middle East, and North Africa (Skydance)
- Sister channels: Cartoon Network; Nickelodeon; Nick Jr.; HBO; Discovery Channel; TLC; DMAX; Discovery Science; Discovery Asia; Animal Planet; Food Network; HGTV; Travel Channel; Eurosport

History
- Launched: 12 August 2005; 21 years ago
- Former names: Asian Food Channel (12 August 2005 – 28 November 2019)

Links
- Website: www.asianfoodnetwork.com

The Asian Food Network (AFN), formerly known as Asian Food Channel, is a Southeast Asian pay television channel and website owned by Skydance Global Content Sales through its Asia-Pacific division. Launched in 2005, it provides a mix of food programming content primarily focused on Asian cuisine.

== History ==
The Asian Food Channel was co-founded by Hian Goh and Maria Brown in 2005. The idea was conceived by Goh, an investment banker, and Brown, a journalist at the BBC, in 2004 to bring a food television channel to Asia.

Content for the network was originally purchased from overseas markets and included shows such as Meat and Greet and Singapore Flavours from Mediacorp. In 2009, it launched AFC Studio at Orchard Central in Singapore. It allowed fans to purchase branded merchandise and also used for original content creation such as Great Dinners of the World and Big Break. By 2013, the network reached 130 million viewers in 12 markets.

Scripps Networks Interactive purchased the channel in 2013. It became part of Discovery, Inc. in 2018 when Discovery acquired Scripps Networks Interactive, Six years after the acquisition of the channel by the same company that owned Food Network, the network was rebranded as the Asian Food Network in 2019, with a larger focus placed on multi-platform content.

== Programming ==
The Asian Food Network provides a wide mix of food programming content that are sourced internationally such as the United Kingdom, the US, Canada, Europe, Australia, as well as Asian specific content from Korea, Japan, China, Philippines, Taiwan, Malaysia, Indonesia, Singapore and Thailand.

Most shows are subtitled, but English shows are sometimes subtitled in Chinese, like in SkyCable. Others don't have subtitles in English programming such as on Cignal.
