= The Flying Winemaker =

- Genre: Food & Travel
- Directed by: Wes Dening
- Presented by: Eddie McDougall
- Country of origin: Hong Kong
- No. of seasons: 1
- No. of episodes: 13

Production
- Producers: Wes Dening, Eddie McDougall
- Production location: Asia Pacific

Original release
- Network: TLC Asia

The Flying Winemaker is an international wine and travel show that premiered in September 2014 on TLC Asia. The program is hosted by Australian winemaker Eddie McDougall. The show focuses on the way food and wine is consumed and enjoyed across Asia. Eddie sheds the light on unorthodox and unique methods for growing quality grapes in new environments and teach local communities the secrets to pairing wines with local dishes. From markets and food stalls to restaurants and even in people’s homes, Eddie reveals combinations that can be replicated in kitchens around the globe.

The show takes place in China, India, Thailand, Japan, Taiwan, Vietnam, Bali and Australia in search of unique wine production and top-class varieties that the world has yet to discover.

== Seasons ==
=== Season 1 ===
Season 1 features 13 episodes and covers wine destinations in Asia & Australia. First aired in September 2014 running through to December 2014. Shown regionally on TLC Asia. Clips of the show are also available on the youtube channel: The Flying Winemaker

Episode Guide

Episode	Destination	Featuring
1	Hong Kong	Christie's Auction House, Zachy's Auction House, Ming Court (Langham Place Hotel), Tim Ho Wan, Yin Yang Private Kitchen
2	Thailand (Hua Hin, Bangkok & Asoke Valley)	Siam Winery, GranMonte Vineyard, Nham Restaurant, Cellar 11, Chachawan Thai
3	India (Mumbai & Nashik Valley)	Raveilo, Vallonne Vineyards, Sula Vineyards, Jashan Restaurant
4	Indonesia (Bali)	Hatten Wines, Ibu Oka Café, Mosaic Restaurant, Sip Wine Bar
5	China	Changyu Winery, Treaty Port Vineyard, Pudao Wines, San Xi Lou, Jim Boyce
6	Australia (Victoria, Yarra Valley & Melbourne)	Thick as Thieves, Rockford, Oakridge, Dal Zotto, Brown Brothers
7	Taiwan	Domaine Shu-Sheng, Puli Distillery, Yong-Kang Beef Noodle, The Good Wine (boutique outlet), Thomas Chang
8	Japan (Tokyo & Yamanashi)	Chateau Mercian, Grace Winery, Jip Wine bar & shop, Kaikaya by the Sea
9	Vietnam (Ho Chi Minh & Dalat)	Xu Restaurant & Lounge, Bar Code, Wine Embassy, Tam Hao, Chom Chom Restaurant
10	China (Ningxia& He Lan Mountains)	Silver Heights, JiaBeiLan, Pernod Ricard
11	India (Bangalore & Nandi Valley)	Grover Vineyards, SDU Winery, Maiya's Restaurant, The Biere Club, 13th Floor
12	Australia (Adelaide Hills, Barossa Valley & Port Lincoln)	Lucy Margaux, St. Halletts, Ferment Asia, Zuma, Toby Barlow
13	Hong Kong (season finale)	Yardbird, Ronin, 22 Ships, Il Milione, Alvin Leung, Celia Hu

Season 2 A second season of the series has yet to be announced. Filming is to take place in 2017.
