= An Viên Television =

Vietnamese television service provider

AVG Television
- Country: Vietnam
- Headquarters: IC Building, 82 Duy Tan str., Hanoi, Vietnam

Ownership
- Owner: Audio Visual Global JSC
- Key people: Mai Duy Long (CEO); Nguyễn Công Dự (Vice President); Vũ Thanh Thủy (Vice President)

History
- Launched: November 11, 2011

Links
- Website: avg.vn

AVG Television is a payment television service provided by Audio Visual Global JSC. AVG Television develops on two platforms: DTT (digital terrestrial television) and DTH (direct to home), broadcasting to all Vietnamese territory. AVG television supports over 100 channels, including 9 high definition (HD) channels: An Vien HD, HBO HD, Fox Movies (Southeast Asia) HD, AXN HD, ESPN HD, Discovery HD, NGC HD, Fox Life (Asia) HD and Fashion TV HD.

== Timeline ==
- 10 October 2010, An Vien Television broadcast experimentally.
- 11 November 2011, An Vien Television officially broadcast.
- 1 January 2012, An Vien Television provided payment television service in Hanoi and Ho Chi Minh city.
- Since 1/5/2012, An Vien Television supported service in 63 provinces/cities through over 1000 post offices by VNPost.
- Since 1 January 2016, An Vien Television merge with Mobifone (one of two biggest Telecom Operator Company in Vietnam) and change to the new name is MobiTV. However, this merger is regarded controversial, and being cancelled following an investigation made by Ministry of Public Security and the Government Inspectorate Agency
- Since 2 April 2020, An Vien Television turned to AVG Television since the foundation of the network

== Channels ==
AVG Television currently co-operated with several local television networks to broadcast their own channels. Their current channels including:

- BTV9 - An Vien TV (BChannel): Asian culture-oriented channel, co-operated with Binh Duong Radio & Television (BTV), Vietnam Cable Television (VTVcab) and Buddhist Sangha of Vietnam
- NCM - BTV10
- Phim Hay: Movie channel. Co-operated with Hanoi Cable Television JSC (Hanoicab)
- Hanoicab 3 - An Ninh Thế Giới: Documentary-themed, crime drama, information. Co-operated with Hanoicab JSC, Saigontourist Cable Television Co. Ltd and Media Department of Ministry of Public Security (Vietnam)
- Hanoicab 4 - MOV: Movies and entertainment channel. Co-operated with Hanoicab JSC
- ViệtTeen - BTV6
- SAM - BTV11
- BPTV3 - ANT: Children-oriented channel. Co-operated with Binh Phuoc Media Consortium (Binh Phuoc Radio-Television & Press, BPTV)

An Vien Television also has various channels where the network has rights to transmit, including:

- Vietnam Television: VTV1, VTV2, VTV3, VTV5, VTV10, VTV7, VTV8, VTV9
- Vietnam Digital Television Network: VTC1, VTC3, VTC7, VTC9, VTC14, VTC16 (All of VTC channel shutdown on January 15th, 2025)
- Ho Chi Minh City Television: HTV2, HTV3, HTV4, HTV7, HTV9, HTVC Thuần Việt
- Other local channels: Hanoi TV1, Hanoi TV2, THVL1, STV1, STV2, THTPCT, THĐT1, BLTV, HANAM, ATV, NTV Nam Dinh, BGTV, THP, KTV, BPTV1, NTV Ninh Binh, THD, QTV1, BRT, Da Nang TV1, KG PTTH, BTV Binh Thuan, BTV Bac Ninh, ĐNRTV1, YTV
- International news: BBC World News, TV5MONDE, CNN, NHK World Japan, Channel NewsAsia, Arirang TV, DW
- Movies and series: HBO (Asia), Cinemax (Asia), WarnerTV, CinemaWorld
- Entertainment: BBC Lifestyle, Fashion TV
- Documentary: Discovery Channel, TLC, Discovery Asia, Animal Planet, BBC Earth
- Kids: Cartoon Network, CBeebies (Disney Channel/Junior shutdown on October 1st, 2021)
- Sports: Fox Sports 1, Fox Sports 2 (Fox Sports shutdown on October 1st, 2021)
- Mainstream national channels: ANTV, QPVN, Vietnam News Assembly TV, VOVTV (Beside ANTV and QPVN, Vietnam News Assembly TV and VOV TV shutdown on January 15th, 2025)
