= Chùa Phổ Lại =

Buddhist temple in Hue, Vietnam

- Pho Lai Pagoda
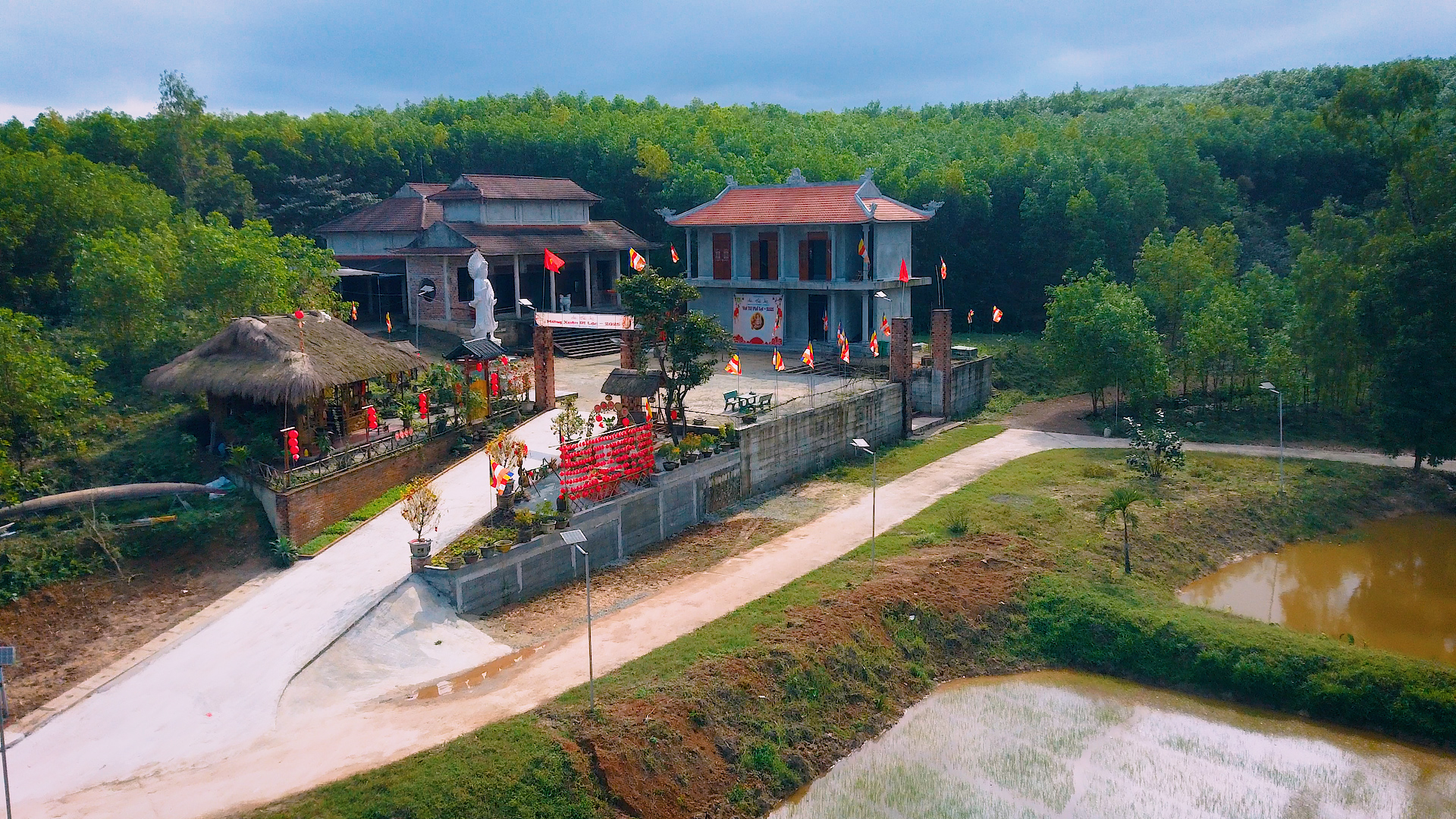
- View of Pho Lai Pagoda seen from above

Religion
- Affiliation: Buddhism in Vietnam
- Sect: Mahayana
- Leadership: Abbot: Thích Trung Hiếu

Location
- Location: Phong Thái Ward, Huế City, Vietnam
- Country: Vietnam
- Interactive map of Chùa Phổ Lại
- Coordinates: 16.5244°N 107.3884°E

Architecture
- Type: Vietnamese Buddhist temple
- Founder: Thích Trung Hiếu
- Established: 2016
- Groundbreaking: 28 August 2016

Chùa Phổ Lại (Pho Lai Pagoda) is a monastic institution of the Vietnam Buddhist Sangha in Phong Thái Ward, (Note: Previously part of Phong Son Commune, it was reorganized into a new administrative ward on July, 1st, 2025, according to Resolution 1675/NQ-UBTVQH15.) Huế City, Vietnam. The pagoda is active in religious and community activities. It also has cultural and charitable programs in the midland region of Huế.

== Location ==
The pagoda is located nearly 28 km northwest of the center of Huế City. It lies on a high land, perched on the hill, facing a lake, surrounded by melaleuca forests and rice paddies.

== History ==
The site originated as Pho Lai Buddhist Recitation Hall (Niệm Phật đường Phổ Lại), set up in 2016. (Note: It was recorded in the 2016 land-use plan of Phong Dien District (Decision No. 518/QD-UBND, Appendix 6).) That same year, the Board of Trustees invited monk Thích Trung Hiếu to take charge of its construction and development. On May 2, 2024, the Vietnam Buddhist Sangha of Huế province officially appointed venerable Thích Trung Hiếu as the abbot of the pagoda (Decision No. 106/QD-BTS).

== Architecture ==
The main structures consist of the Main Hall (this started on August 28, 2016) the monks’ Quarters, a Buddha statue and a bell weighing about 500 kg. From 2022 to 2025, there were some additions which were made such as the main gate, the flood protection wall, a two-storey meditation hall, a guest house, a lotus pond, a monolithic stone statue of Quan Âm about 5 meters tall, and the "Tịnh Tâm Hill" landscape area designed for exhibitions and meditation.

== Religious activities ==
Summary of Buddhist activities at Phổ Lại Pagoda in 2025

The pagoda holds mindfulness retreats, Vesak Day, Vu Lan festival ceremony, and Buddhist doctrine classes. The Great Quan Âm ceremony is held annually in the middle of the 6th lunar month and it features a lot of activities, including cultural performances, exhibitions of paintings, calligraphy, handicrafts. The pagoda offers vegetarian buffets, floating lantern releases, ceremonial offerings, talk shows, and charity programs. According to Tạp chí Nghiên cứu Phật học, the 2026 festival combined religious, cultural, educational, and charitable activities intended to bring Buddhist teachings closer to everyday life and promote compassion within the community.

== Social work ==
The pagoda's activities include awarding scholarships and giving gifts to households. It also holds events such as the Tết celebration of Pho Lai which gives Mid-Autumn gifts, International Children's Day celebrations, and programs to support people affected by flooding in Vietnam's central regions. According to a report by An Viên Television, Phổ Lại Pagoda served as a relief distribution point during the 2025 floods, providing food and other supplies to residents in flood-affected areas.

During the 2020 Central Vietnam floods, the pagoda reported distributing more than 464 million VND in relief assistance. It has also installed 25 solar-powered light poles in the local area, organized traditional medicine health check-ups, and supported home repairs for disadvantaged families.

== Gallery ==
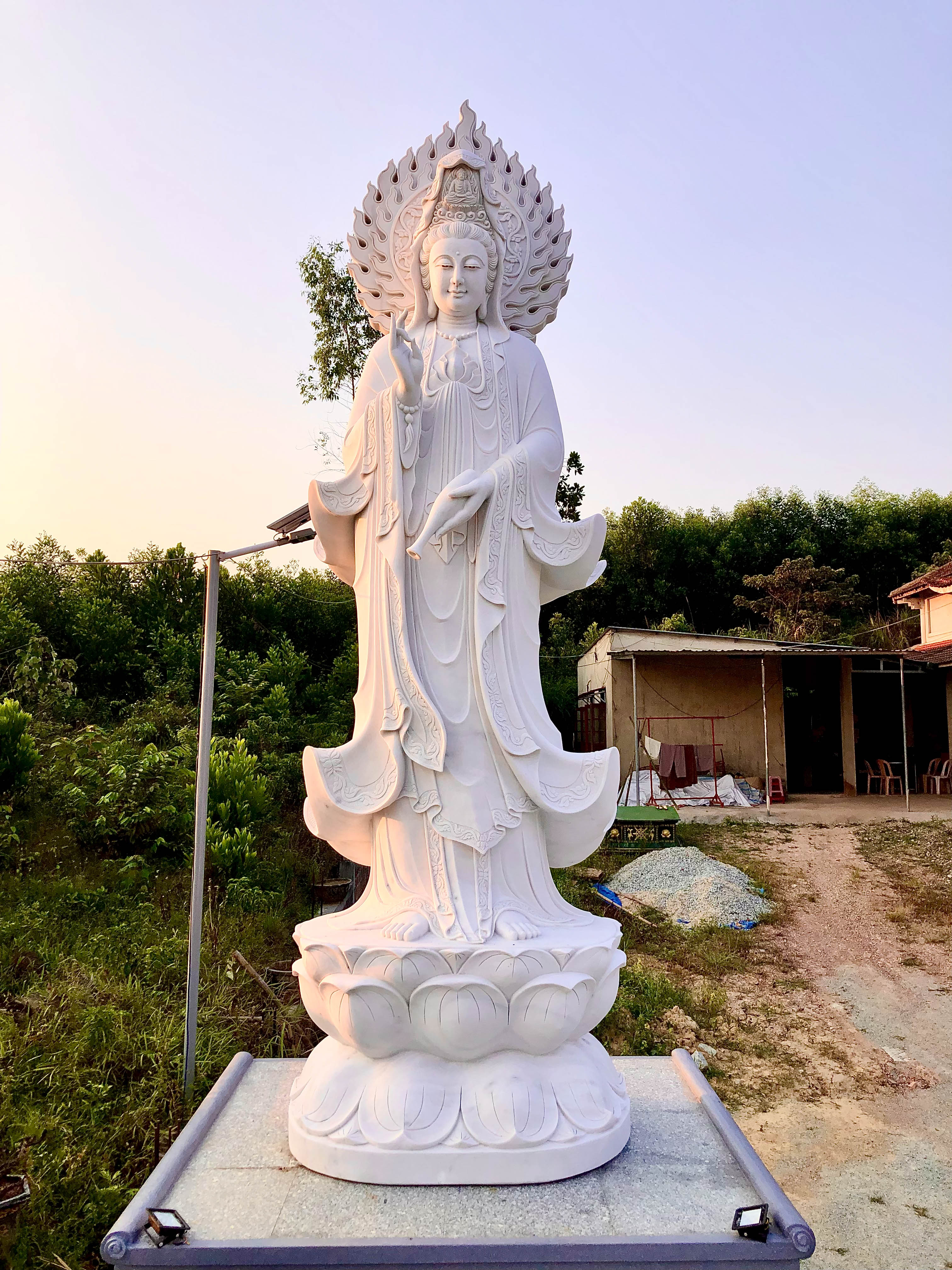
Stone statue of Quan Âm on the grounds of Phổ Lại Pagoda

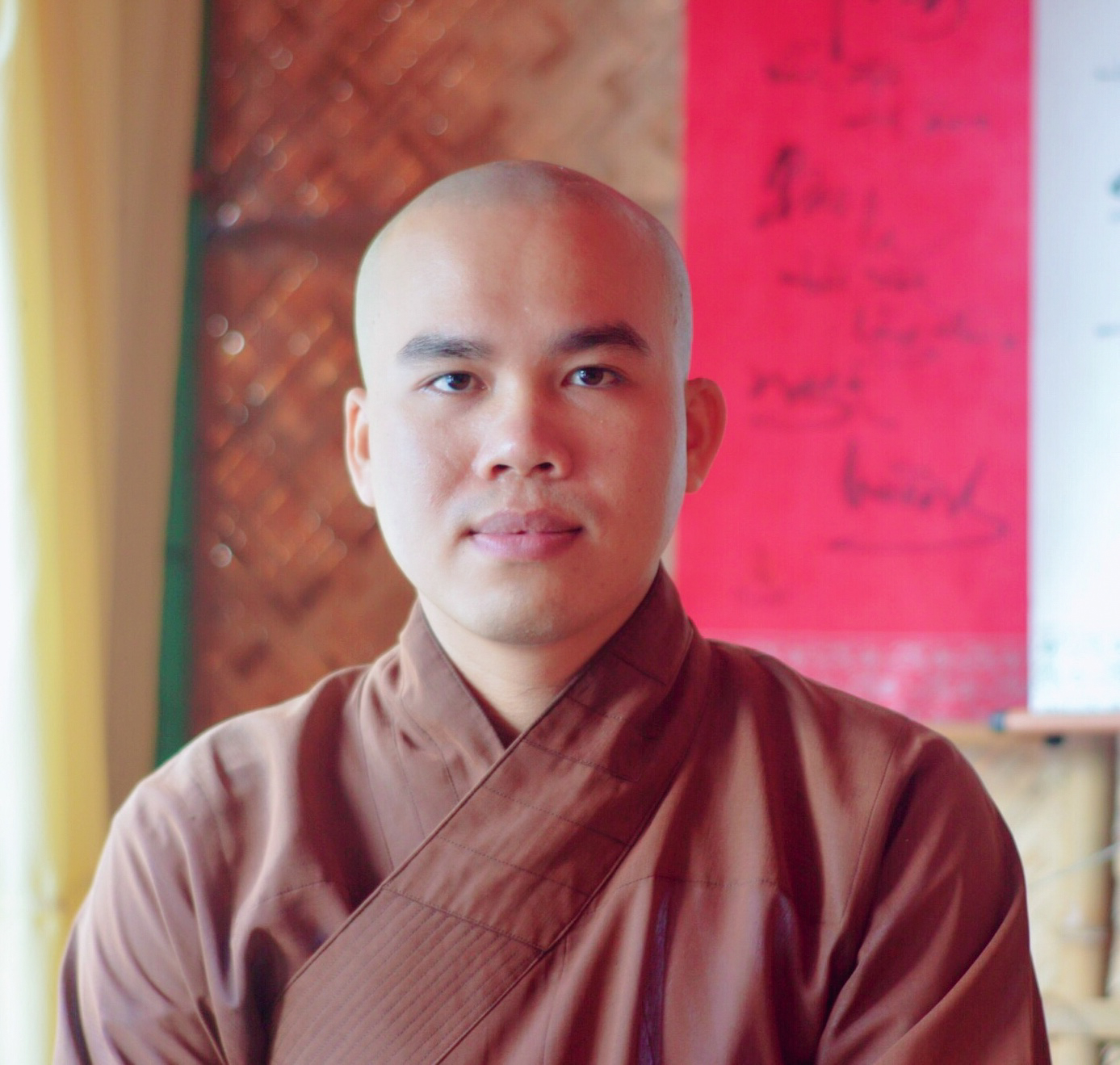
Thích Trung Hiếu, abbot of Phổ Lại Pagoda

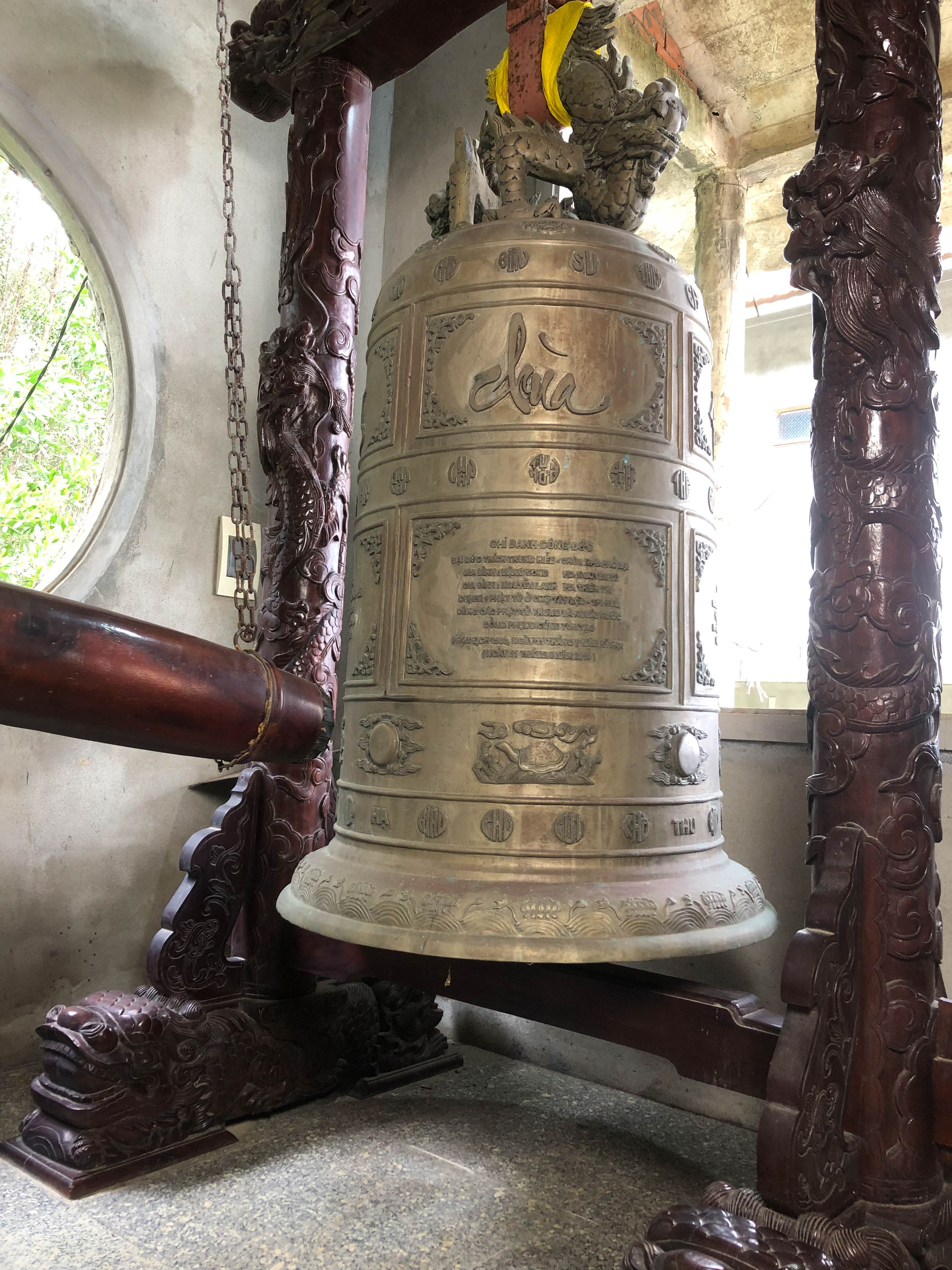
The great bell of Phổ Lại Pagoda

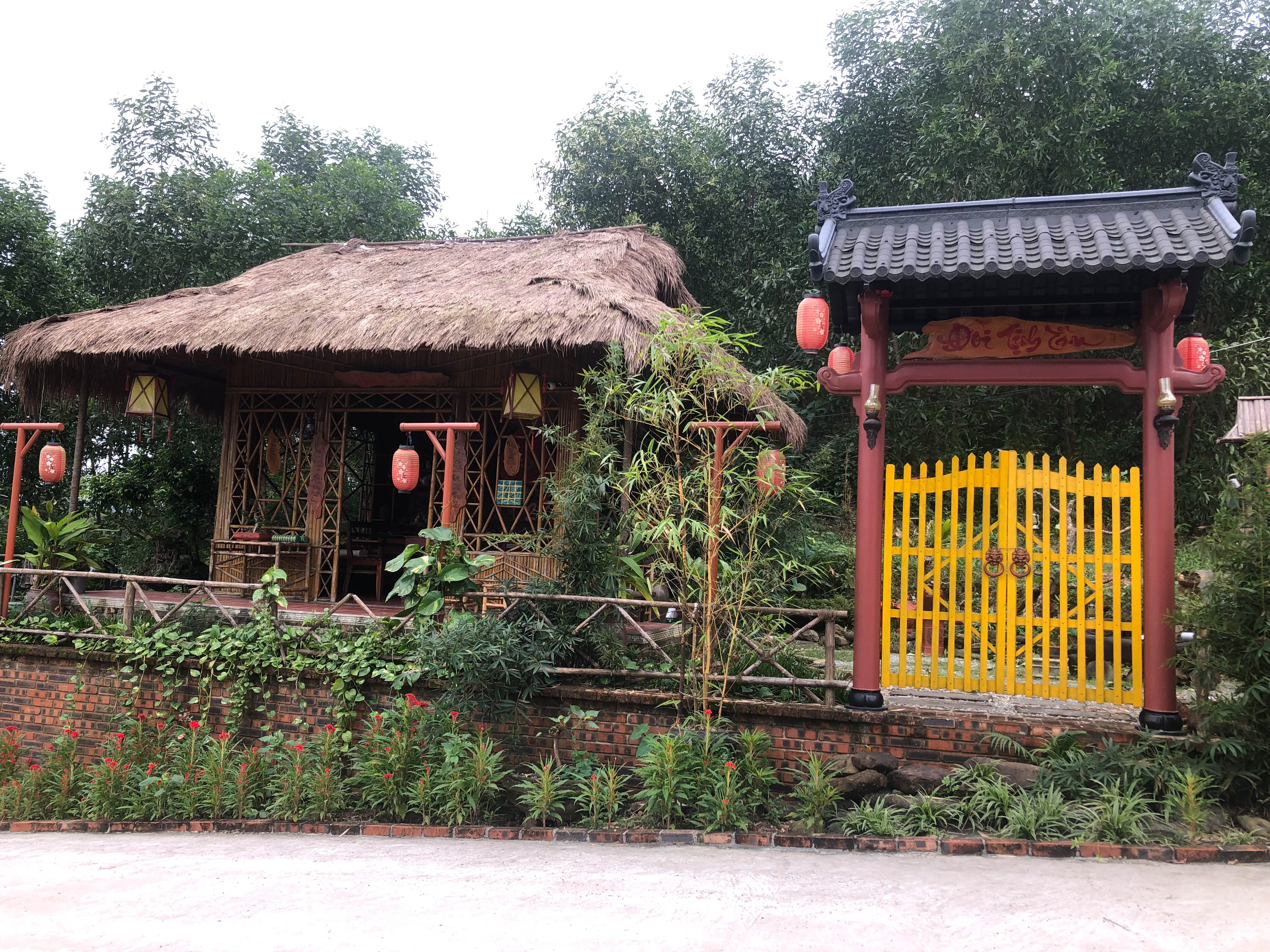
Tịnh Tâm Hill at Phổ Lại Pagoda

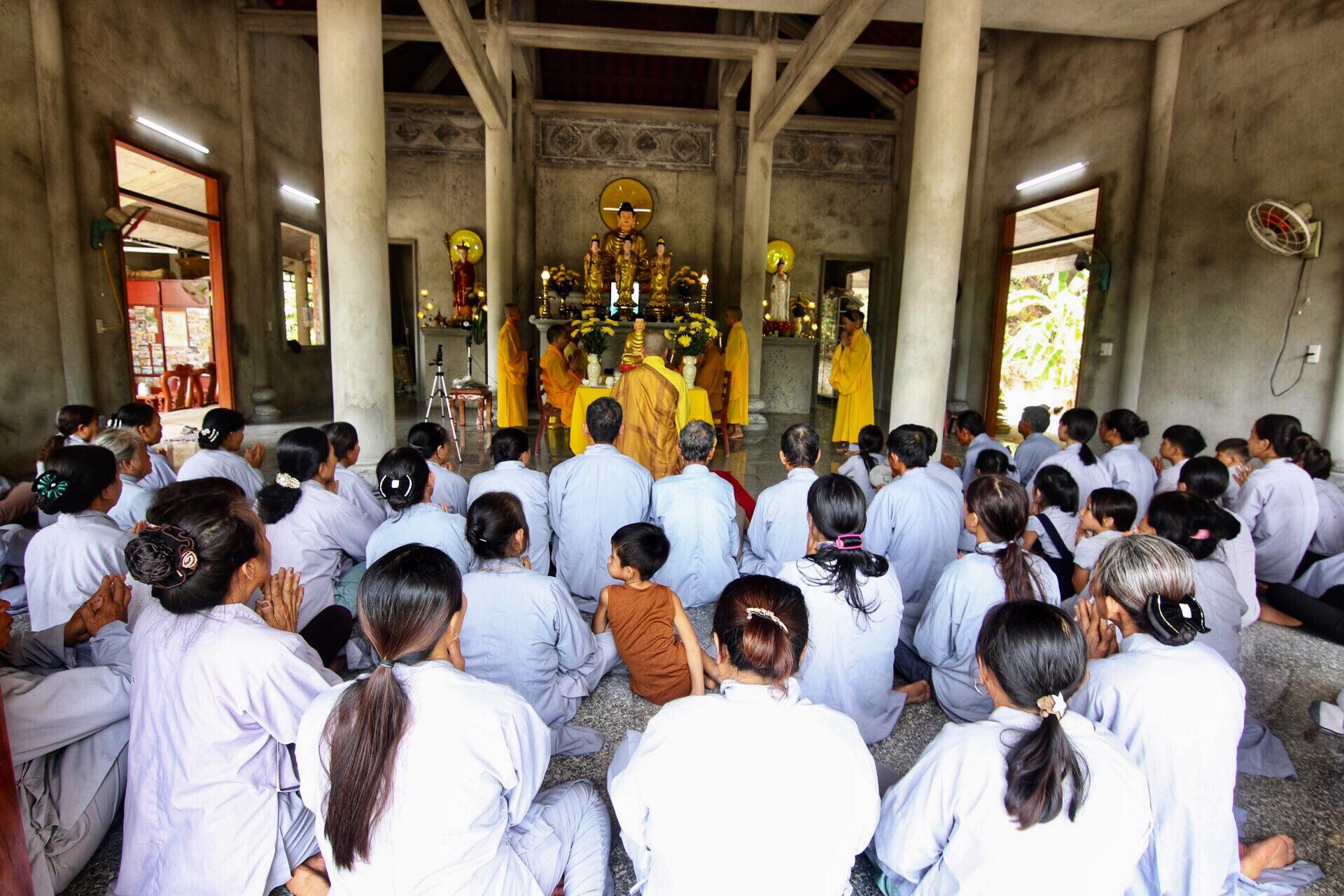
A ceremony in the main hall of Phổ Lại Pagoda

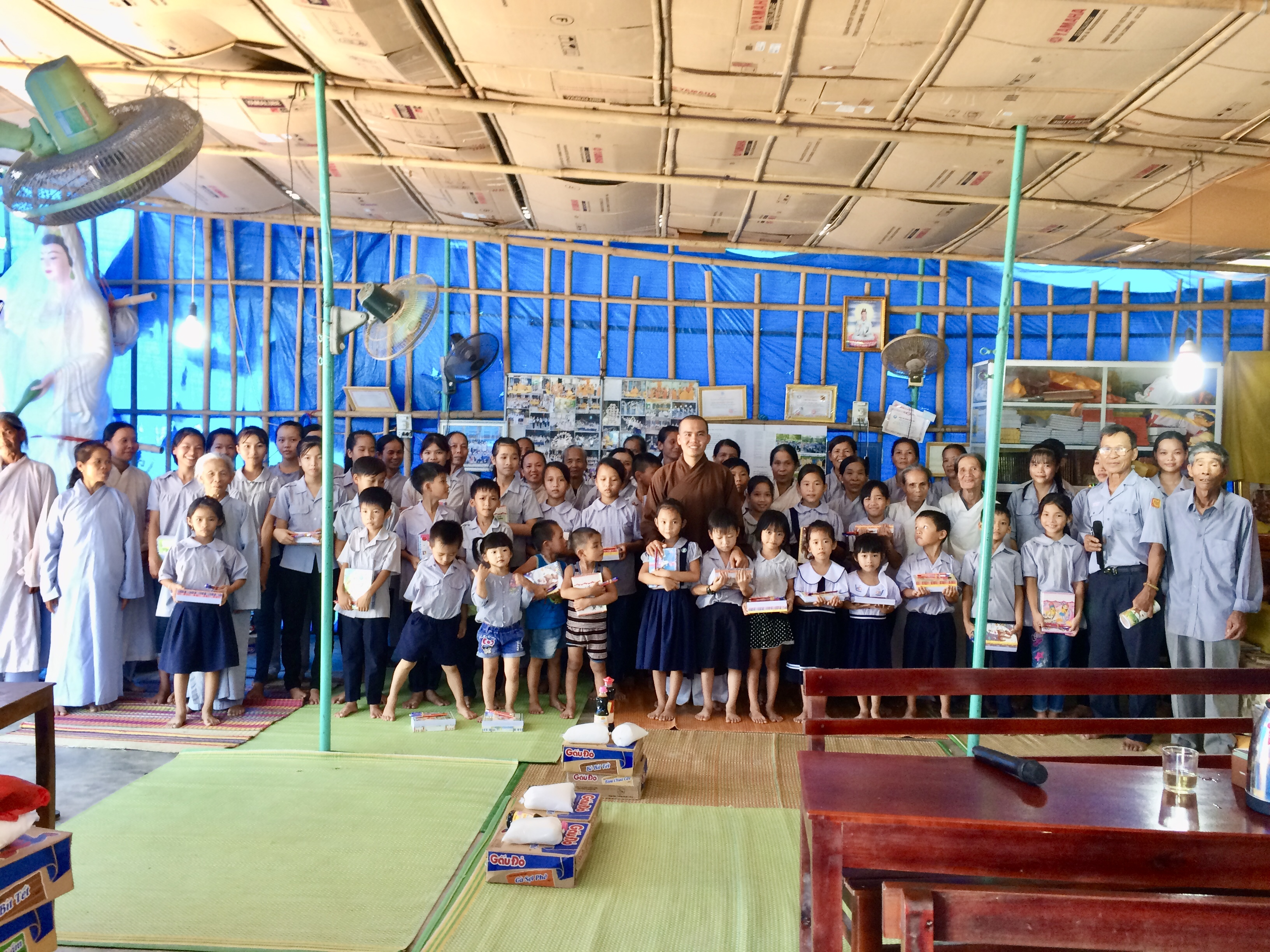
The former temporary bamboo shrine before the construction of the main hall

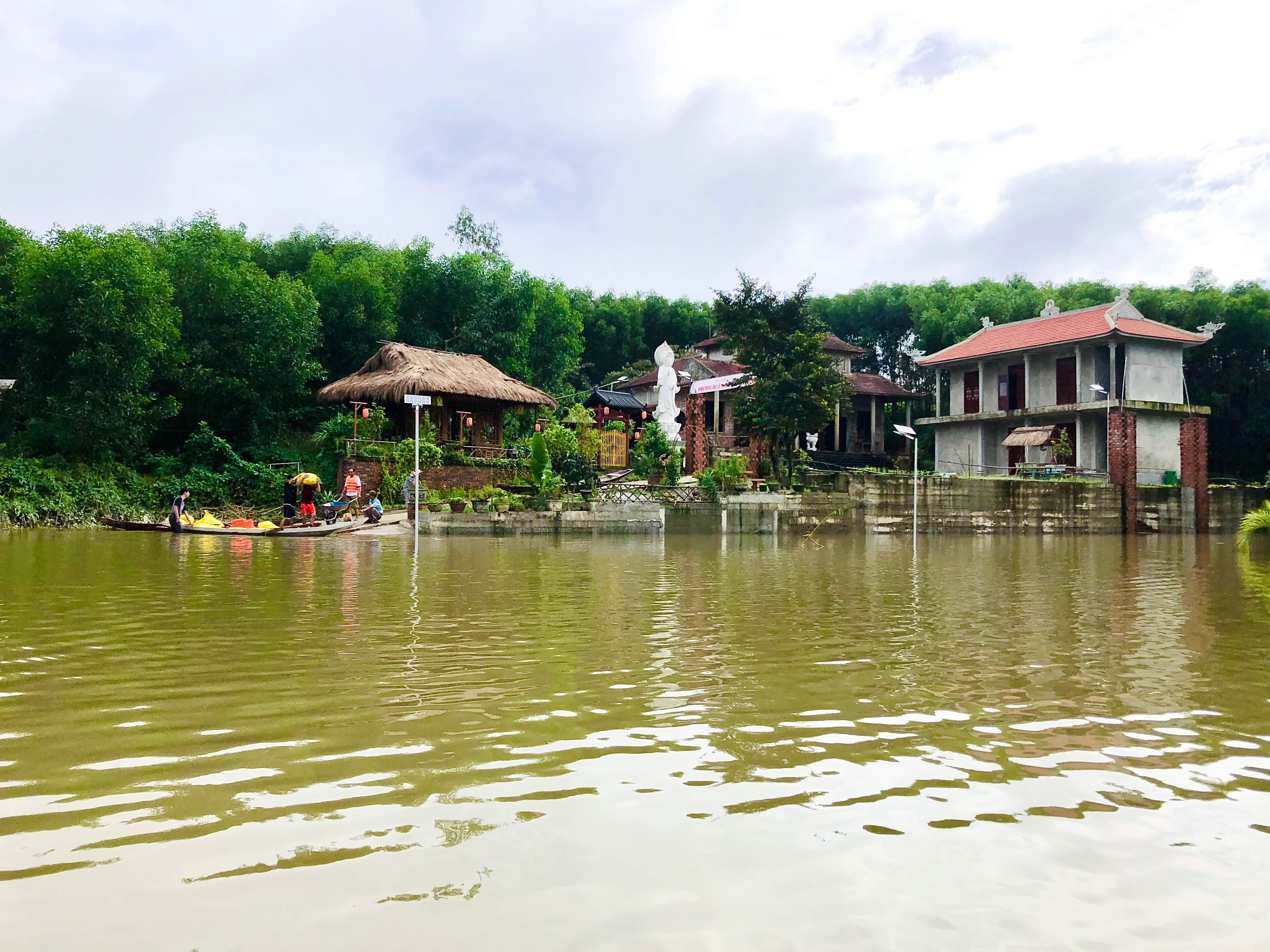
Flood-relief activities at Phổ Lại Pagoda, using boats to deliver essential aid to local communities during seasonal flooding

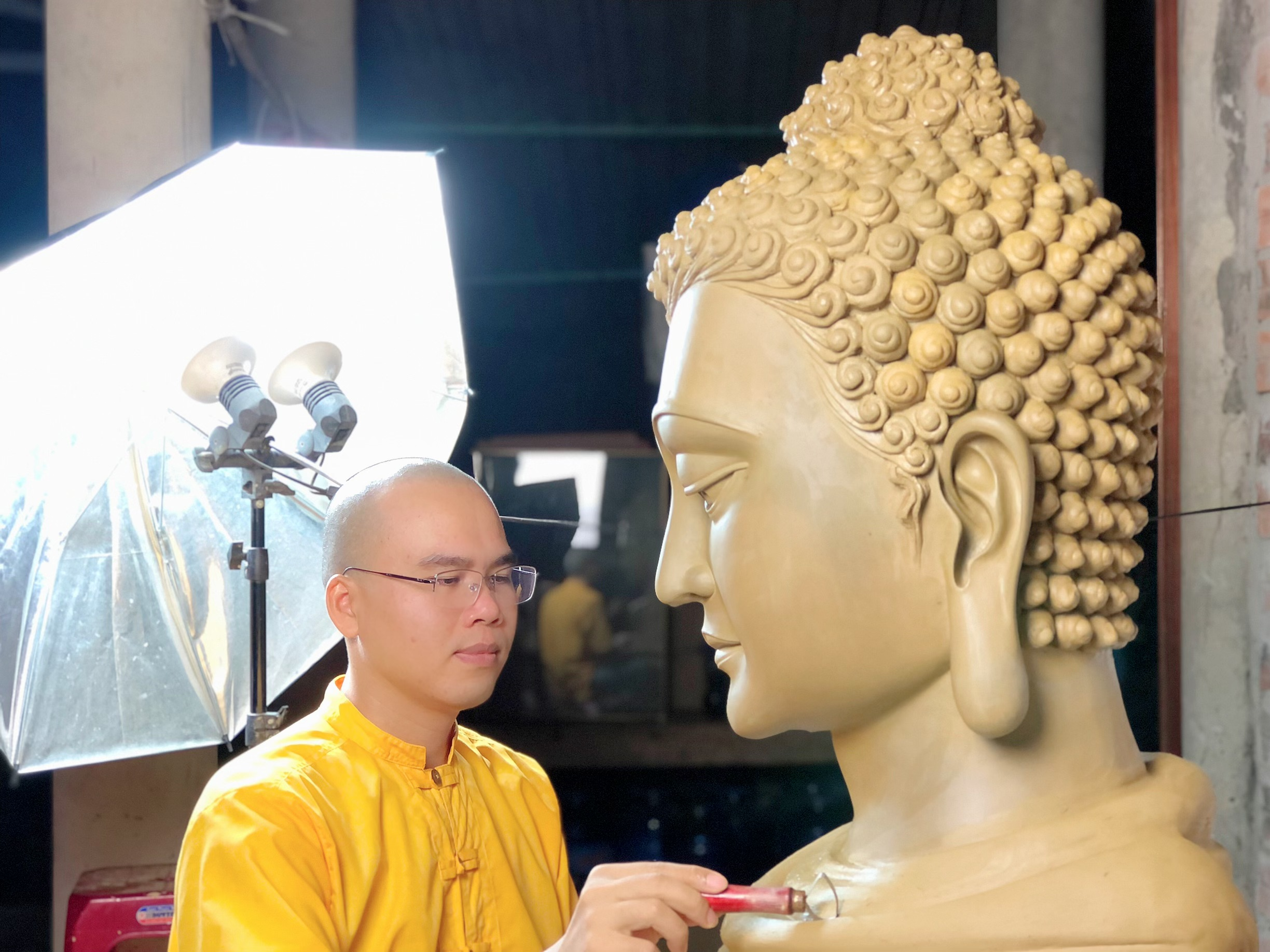
Buddha statue carved by the pagoda's abbot, Thích Trung Hiếu

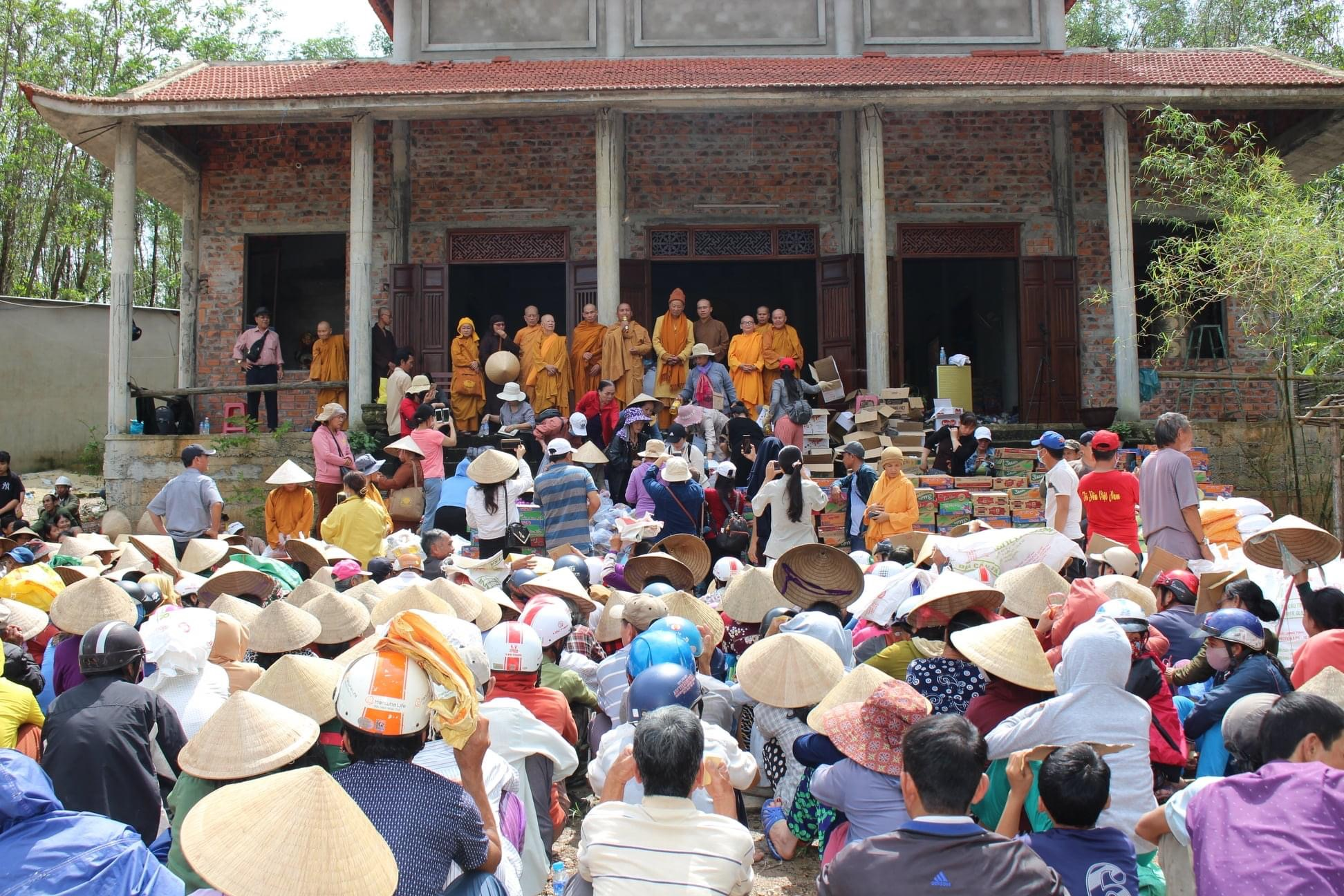
Local residents gather at Phổ Lại Pagoda in Huế to receive emergency aid during flood relief efforts organized by the pagoda (2020)

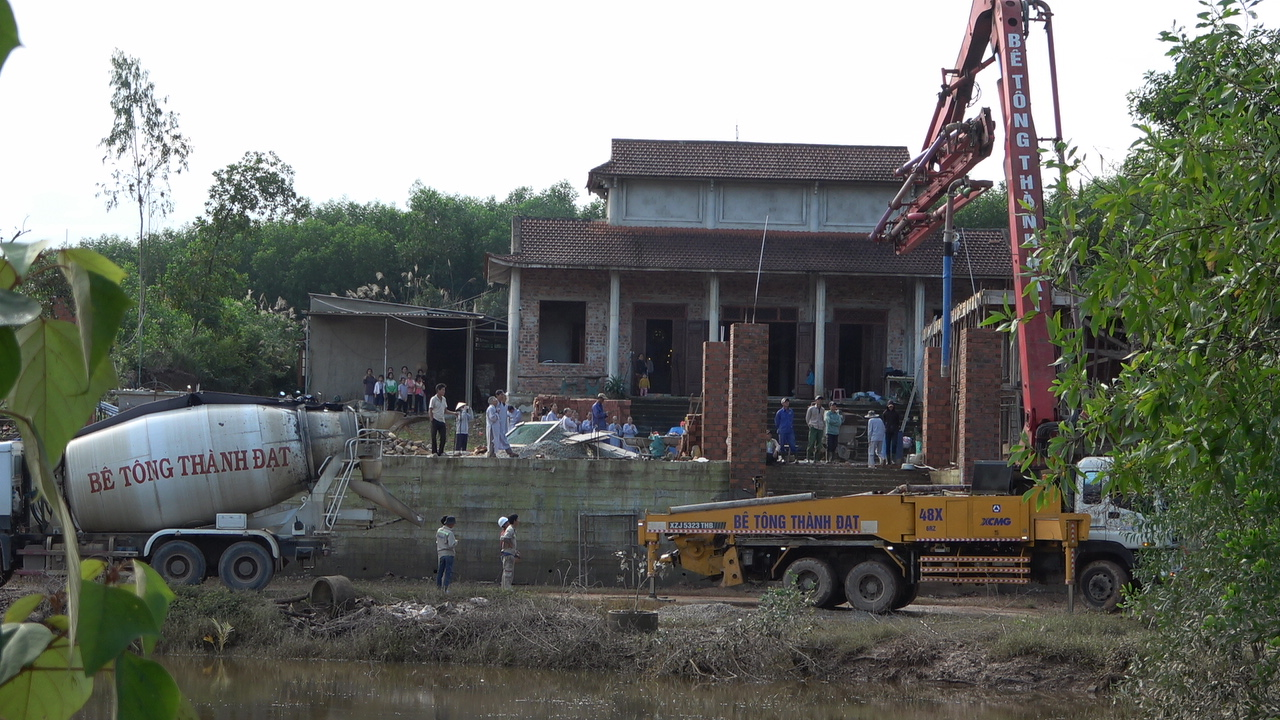
Construction work at Phổ Lại Pagoda (2024)
