= Discovery Science (Asian TV channel) =

Asian pay television channel

- Logo used since 1 September 2021
- Country: Singapore; Philippines; Indonesia; China; Taiwan; Hong Kong; Macau; India
- Broadcast area: Southeast Asia (except Malaysia, Vietnam & Thailand); China; Hong Kong; Taiwan
- Headquarters: Singapore

Programming
- Language: English
- Picture format: 1080i HDTV

Ownership
- Owner: Skydance Asia-Pacific, Middle East and North Africa
- Sister channels: List: Animal Planet; Asian Food Network; Boomerang; Cartoon Network; Nickelodeon; Cartoonito; Nick Jr.; CNN; Discovery Asia; Discovery Channel; DMAX; Cinemax; HBO; HBO Family; HBO Hits; HBO Signature; HGTV; TLC; Trvl Channel

History
- Launched: 1998 (Discovery Sci-Trek) 2003 (Discovery Science); 2021; 5 years ago (Indonesia)
- Closed: March 1, 2021; 5 years ago (SD feed, Malaysia); October 1, 2021; 5 years ago (HD feed, Malaysia)
- Replaced by: BBC Earth (Astro, Malaysia)
- Former names: Discovery Sci-Trek (1998-2003)

Discovery Science is a Southeast Asian pay television channel owned by Skydance Asia-Pacific, Middle East and North Africa. The channel features programs showcasing subjects in the fields of archeology and history, astronomy and space exploration, physics and engineering, manufacturing, and technology, among others, which is similar to the content being shown in its USA channel counterpart, Science Channel. However, unlike its USA channel version, there is a delay in showcasing its brand-new content, as such shows will first air on its sister channels, such as Discovery Channel.

== List of programs aired ==
The following programs aired on Discovery Science Asia:

- Alaska Mega Machines
- Alien Encounters
- Alien Storms
- America: Facts vs. Fiction
- American Treasures
- Ancient Unexplained Files
- The Ancient Life
- Bad Universe
- Best Of G.I. Factory
- Blowing Up History
- Body Bizarre
- Broken Minds
- Build It Bigger
- Bone Detectives
- The Big Experiment
- Catalyst (TV program)
- Countdown to Collision
- Curse of the Bermuda Triangle
- Dark Matters: Twisted But True
- Deadliest Tech
- Dive to the Bottom of the World
- The Detonators
- The Dark Side of the Sun
- Edge of War
- Engine Masters
- Extraordinary Stories Behind Everyday Things
- Exodus: Earth
- Extreme Engineering
- The Explosion Show
- Factory Made
- Fatal Flight: Shoreham
- Flying Anvils (SCI Sports)
- Funny or Die's High Science
- Futureweapons
- Futurescape With James Wood
- The Gadget Show: World Show
- The Gadget Show
- Gadget Man
- Hitller's Secret Bomb
- Houdini's Last Secrets
- How Do They Do It?
- How It's Made
- How the Earth Works
- How The Universe Works
- How To Build... Everything
- How Tech Works
- Hunting Atlantis
- India's Space Odyssey
- Industrial Revelations: Best of British Engineering
- Invent It Rich
- Junkies
- Junkyard Wars
- Killers of the Cosmos
- Last Exit: Space
- Man v Expert
- Mark Rober's Revengineers
- Massive Engines
- Mega Builders
- Mega Engineering
- Mega Moves
- Mega Shippers
- Modern Sniper
- Moon Machines
- Mysteries of the Deep
- My Team: The Cheerleaders
- NASA's Unexplained Files
- The New Inventors
- Oddities
- One Giant Leap: A Neil Armstrong Tribute
- Prophets of Science Fiction
- The Quick and the Curious
- Race to Escape
- Richard Hammond's Big
- Rise of the Machines
- Savage Builds
- Sci Fi Science
- Science of the Movies
- Scijinks
- SciTrek
- Secret Space Escapes
- Secrets of the Underground
- Some Assembly Required
- Stephen Hawking 2: The Grand Design
- Strangest Weather on Earth
- Street Science
- Stuck With Hackett
- Super Factories: Food Edition
- Super Systems
- Taiwan Revealed: Green Savers
- This is Mark Rober
- This Came Out of Me
- Through The Wormhole With Morgan Freeman
- Triggers: Weapons That Changed The World
- Truth Behind the Moon Landing
- Tornado Rampage 2011
- Unexplained and Unexplored
- Unwrapped
- Ultimate Sports Day
- Weaponizers
- Weaponology
- Weird Connections
- What You Can't See
- Why Planes Crash
- World's Top 5
- You Have Been Warned

SOURCES[2][3][4][5][6][7][8][9][10][11][12][13][14][15][16][17][18][19][20][21][22][23][24][25][26][27][28][29][30][31][32]

== Current feeds ==
Hong Kong

Available on Now TV Channel 211.

Philippines

Available on Asian Cable Communications Inc (ACCION PH).

The channel was available on Sky Cable until January 1, 2017. Numerous Discovery Science programs continued to air via Discovery Channel.

The channel was also available on Cablelink Channel 231 and G Sat Channel 40.

Taiwan

Available on CHT MOD Channel 254.

== Defunct feeds ==
Indonesia

The channel was available via MNC Vision, First Media, and TransVision.

Malaysia

This channel was available on Astro via channel 554. On September 15, 2021, it was moved from channel 554 to 557. Thirty days after Discovery Science rebranded in Southeast Asia on September 1, 2021, its Malaysian feed closed on October 1, 2021, due to bad reviews of the channel's performance. It was later replaced by BBC Earth (launched on the said cable TV provider on September 15, 2021) on channel 554.

Singapore

The channel was available on Singtel TV Channel 205 and on StarHub TV.

Thailand

This channel was available on TrueVisions.

== See also ==
- Science Channel
- Discovery Channel
