= Thích Trung Hiếu =

Vietnamese Buddhist monk and abbot of Phổ Lại Pagoda

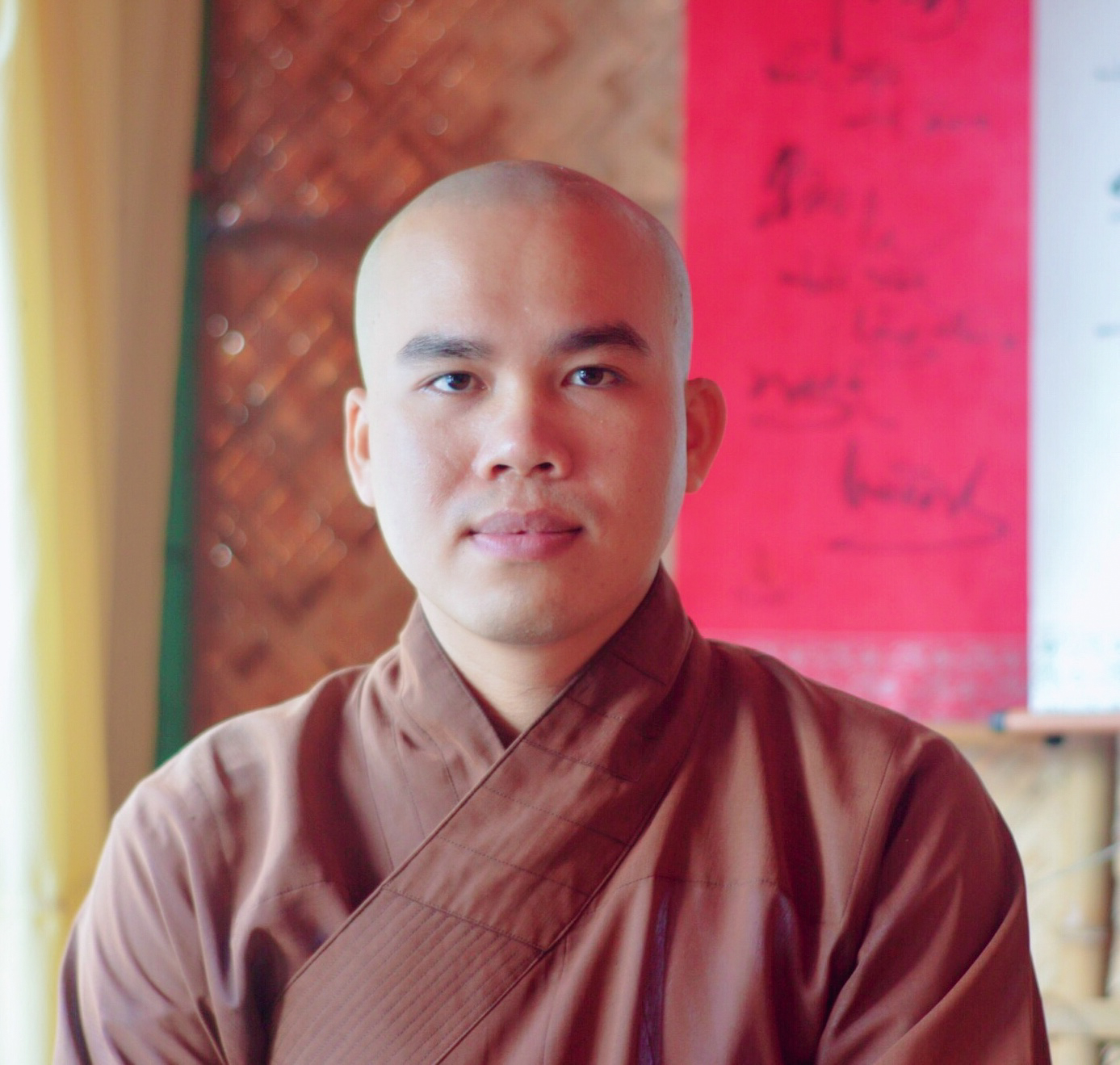
- Portrait of Thích Trung Hiếu (2022)
- Title: Venerable (Buddhist clergy)

Personal life
- Born: Nguyễn Hồng Tùng; 7 August 1996 (age 30) Phan Rí Cửa, Bình Thuận, Vietnam
- Notable work: Thiền Ca Chùa Phổ Lại (Buddhist music album)
- Known for: Founding and development of Phổ Lại Pagoda; Buddhist music and poetry; community-based charitable activities
- Occupation: Buddhist monk, poet, songwriter, author
- Website: YouTube channel (Thích Trung Hiếu)

Religious life
- Religion: Buddhism
- Temple: Chùa Phổ Lại
- School: Mahayana Buddhism

Thích Trung Hiếu (born Nguyễn Hồng Tùng on 7 August 1996 in Bình Thuận) is a Vietnamese Buddhist monk, poet and composer. He is the abbot of Phổ Lại Pagoda in Huế and has overseen its construction and development since 2016. Beyond his religious duties, he has been involved in social and charitable activities, as well as Buddhist arts, including poetry, music, calligraphy, and Buddhist sculpture.

== Early life and monastic training ==
Thích Trung Hiếu was born Nguyễn Hồng Tùng on 7 August 1996 in Phan Rí Cửa, Bình Thuận. (Note: On June 12, 2025, Bình Thuận was incorporated into Lâm Đồng province.) He is the youngest of five children in a Buddhist family. He entered monastic life at the age of 13 and began his training at Long Quang Pagoda in Phan Rí Cửa, where he received the Dharma name Quảng Chính (廣正) and studied under the late Venerable Thích Phước Huệ. He later continued his training at Thạnh Phước Pagoda in Bến Tre and received the Dharma title Thích Trung Hiếu (釋 中 孝) from Venerable Thích Minh Hiền. In 2015, he was fully ordained as a Bhikkhu (monk) at Bảo Tịnh Pagoda in Hậu Giang and completed an intermediate Buddhist studies programme in Trà Vinh. In 2016, he moved to Huế, where he began his Buddhist work at Phổ Lại Buddhist Recitation Hall.

== Role at Phổ Lại Pagoda ==
In 2016, Thích Trung Hiếu was invited by the Board of Stewards of the Phổ Lại Buddhist Recitation Hall (Niệm Phật đường Phổ Lại) to serve as abbot. He has since overseen the site's construction and development from a Buddhist recitation hall into the present-day Phổ Lại Pagoda. On 2 May 2024, he was officially appointed abbot by the Vietnam Buddhist Sangha of Thừa Thiên Huế Province.

== Religious and community activities ==
Thích Trung Hiếu distributing gifts to local residents during a community charity program at Phổ Lại Pagoda (2026)

At Phổ Lại Pagoda, Thích Trung Hiếu has been involved in Buddhist educational and community activities, including classes for young people, monastic meal rituals, and Dharma-sharing sessions. In 2025, Thích Trung Hiếu presented 25 scholarships, worth a total of 13 million VND, to local students during the Quan Âm Festival. In 2026, Tạp chí Nghiên cứu Phật học identified him as the abbot of Phổ Lại Pagoda and head of the organizing committee for the Quan Âm Dharma Assembly.

== Social activities ==
Thích Trung Hiếu delivering relief supplies by boat to flood-affected communities in Huế during severe flooding in 2020

Thích Trung Hiếu has participated in charitable work linked to Phổ Lại Pagoda, including programmes supporting disadvantaged households. During the 2025 Central Vietnam floods, An Viên Television reported on relief efforts at the pagoda. The report included remarks from Hồ Đức Năm, a local official in Phong Thái Ward, who thanked Thích Trung Hiếu's volunteer group for assisting local residents. Rising Asia Journal described Thích Trung Hiếu's approach as emphasizing compassion in daily life, community solidarity, and the role of spiritual institutions in responding to contemporary social challenges. On 12 June 2025, the Vietnam Buddhist Sangha in Huế City recognized him for his contributions to Buddhist affairs and social work.

== Artistic activities ==
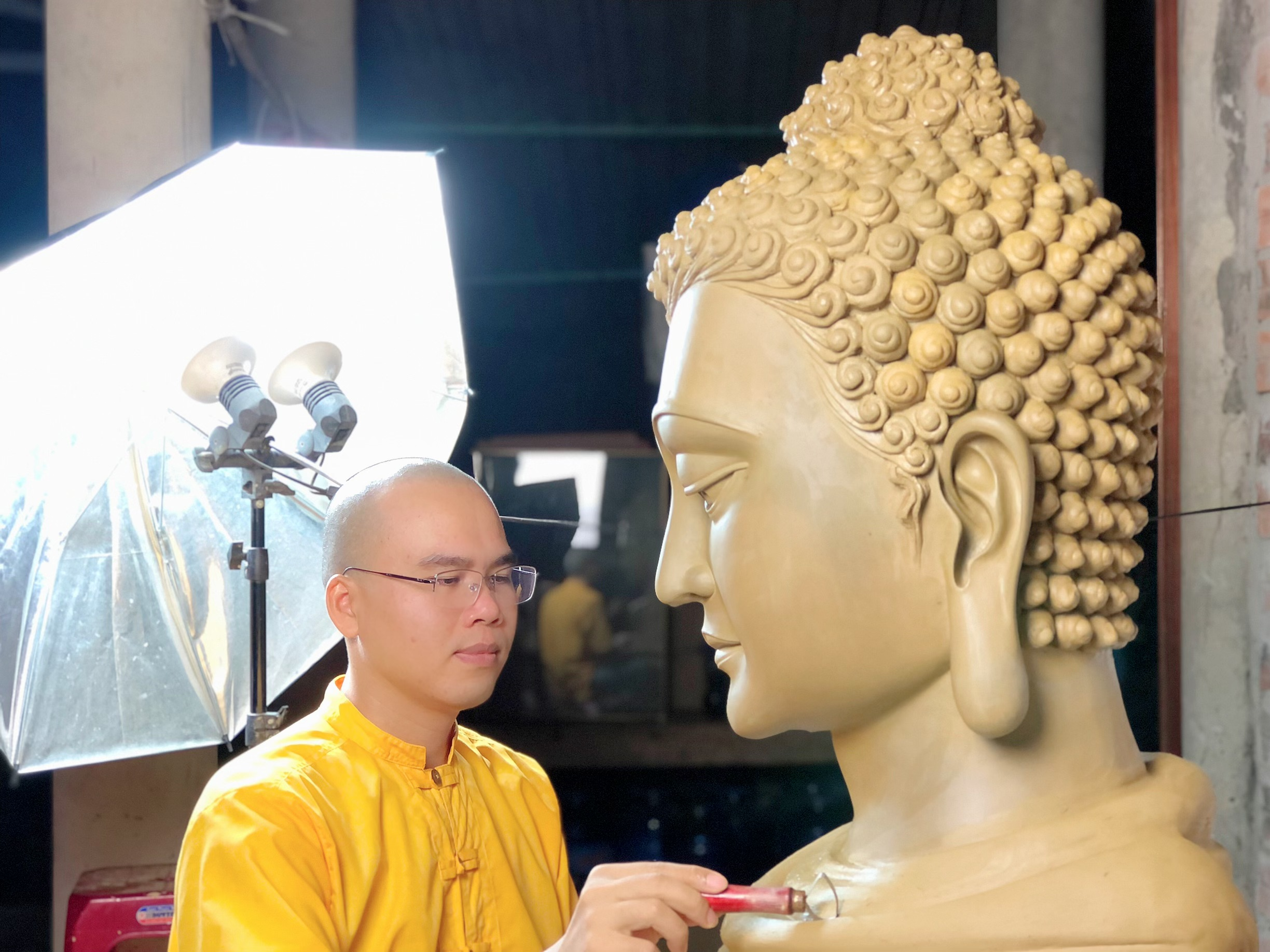
Buddhist statue sculpture by Thích Trung Hiếu at Phổ Lại Pagoda (2022)

Thích Trung Hiếu has written music, including the album Thiền Ca Chùa Phổ Lại (Zen Songs of Phổ Lại Pagoda), which was registered with the Copyright Office of Vietnam in 2021. Some compositions from the album have also been released on online music platforms.

He is also a poet, with works published in literary anthologies and in Sông Hương, including Rừng thiền and Mây nước, as well as Sơn thủy hữu tình. His other artistic practices include calligraphy, painting, and Buddhist statue carving.
