= TLC (Asian TV channel) =

Southeast Asian pay television channel

- Country: Singapore
- Broadcast area: Southeast Asia; Hong Kong; Macau; Taiwan; South Korea

Programming
- Languages: English; Chinese (Mandarin/Cantonese; Hong Kong, Macau, Taiwan, Singapore and Malaysia); Indonesian (Indonesia); Malay (Malaysia & Singapore); Thai (Thailand); Filipino (Philippines); Vietnamese (Vietnam); Korean
- Picture format: 1080i HDTV

Ownership
- Owner: Skydance Asia-Pacific, Middle East, and North Africa (Skydance)
- Sister channels: Discovery Channel; Animal Planet; DMAX; Discovery Science; Discovery Asia; Asian Food Network; Food Network; Travel Channel Asia; HGTV Asia

History
- Launched: 4 June 2001; 25 years ago
- Former names: Discovery Travel & Adventure (2001-2004); Discovery Travel & Living (2005-2010)

Links
- Website: tlcasia.com

TLC is a Southeast Asian pay television channel that was launched in June 2001 as Discovery Travel & Adventure. It was the third channel launched by Skydance in the region. It was initially focused on providing travel-related entertainment.

On 1 January 2005, the channel was rebranded as Discovery Travel & Living and received new programming. This was part of a major action within Discovery International to focus on lifestyle programming. The new schedules featured many cooking programmes and makeover shows.

On 1 September 2010, the channel was rebranded again into TLC, with international and local lineups. The new channel was said to be "bigger, better and bolder, featuring new places, genres, and faces."

== Programming ==
- 1,000 Places to See Before You Die
- Amazing Eats
- Anthony Bourdain: The Layover
- Anthony Bourdain: No Reservations
- Armando's Asian Twist
- Around the World in 80 Plates
- Bazaar
- Cake Boss
- Chic Eats
- Fabulous Cakes
- The Flying Winemaker
- Fun Asia
- Fun Taiwan
- Fun Taiwan Challenge
- How To Cook Like Heston
- Island Feast With Peter Kuruvita
- Jamie's 15-Minute Meals
- Jamie's 30 Minute Meals
- Kitchen Boss
- Man v. Food Nation
- Mission Menu
- My Big Fat American Gypsy Wedding
- Now Boarding India
- The Originals with Emeril
- Project Accessory
- Samantha Brown: Passport To Latin America
- Take Home Chef
- "The Flying Winemaker"
- The World's Richest People
- World's Weirdest Restaurants

== See also ==
- TLC (TV network)
- TLC (India)
