= GranMonte Vineyard =

- Native name: ไร่องุ่นกราน-มอนเต้
- Type: Private
- Industry: Wine production
- Founded: 1999
- Founder: Visooth Lohitnavy

GranMonte Vineyard (Thai: ไร่องุ่นกราน-มอนเต้) is a vineyard located outside Khao Yai National Park in Pak Chong district of Nakhon Ratchasima province, Thailand specializing in tropical viticulture.

== History ==
Founded in 1999 by Visooth Lohitnavy, the vineyard produces traditional white and red grape wines. Visooth subsequently founded the Thai Wine Association in 2004.

Visooth's daughter Nikki has become an advocate for small alcohol producers in Thailand. As of 2021, the estate produces 100,000 bottles annually.

In 2025, Khao Yai Vanilla launched on the GranMonte estate to provide single-origin vanilla.
