= Discovery Channel (Southeast Asia) =

Asian television channel

- Country: Singapore
- Broadcast area: Southeast Asia; Hong Kong; Fiji; Macau; Maldives; Mongolia; Taiwan; South Korea; Japan; Palau; Tuvalu; Papua New Guinea

Programming
- Languages: English; Chinese (Mandarin/Cantonese); Japanese; Korean; Indonesian; Malay; Thai; Filipino; Vietnamese
- Picture format: 1080i HDTV

Ownership
- Owner: Skydance Corporation
- Sister channels: Animal Planet; TLC; DMAX; Discovery Science; Discovery Asia; Eurosport

History
- Launched: July 30, 1995; 31 years ago

Links
- Website: discoverychannelasia.com

Discovery Channel Southeast Asia (known as The Discovery Channel from 1985 to 1995, often referred to as simply Discovery) is the Southeast Asian version of Discovery Channel operated by Skydance Global Content Sales, a division of Skydance Corporation, a publicly traded company run by CEO David Zaslav.
