= Discovery Asia =

Southeast Asian pay television channel

- Country: Singapore; Indonesia; Malaysia; Thailand; Vietnam; Philippines; India; Pakistan; Sri Lanka; Bangladesh; Nepal; Maldives; Australia; New Zealand; China; Japan; South Korea; Hong Kong; Taiwan; Macau; Mongolia
- Broadcast area: Asia-Pacific (including East, South, Southeast Asia, Australia & New Zealand and the Pacific Islander)
- Headquarters: 3 Changi Business Park Vista, Singapore

Programming
- Languages: English, Hindi, Tamil, Telugu, Bengali, Kannada, Malayalam, Urdu, Nepali, Marathi, Sinhala, Pashto, Punjabi, Gujarati, Odia, Māori, Mongolian, Chinese (Mandarin & Cantonese), Japanese, Korean, Indonesian, Malay, Thai, Filipino, Vietnamese
- Picture format: 1080i HDTV

Ownership
- Owner: Skydance Asia-Pacific, Middle East, and North Africa (Skydance)
- Sister channels: Discovery Channel, Discovery Channel Tamil, Animal Planet, Asian Food Network, Food Network Asia, TLC, DMAX, Discovery Science

History
- Launched: February 2005; 21 years ago
- Replaced: Discovery Science (NJOI)
- Former names: Discovery HD (2005–2010); Discovery HD World (2010–2017; except in India)

Availability

Terrestrial
- (Malaysia) Astro: Channel 553 (HD)
- (Malaysia) NJOI: Channel 553 (HD)
- (Singapore) StarHub TV: Channel 438 (HD)

Streaming media
- (Malaysia) Astro: Astro GO / On Demand
- (Singapore) StarHub TV: StarHub TV+

Discovery Asia (formerly known as Discovery HD and Discovery HD World) is a Southeast Asian pay television channel that features Asia-related documentaries and original Asian programming. It is operated by Skydance through its Asia-Pacific division.

== History ==
The channel was launched in 2005 as Discovery HD, the first high-definition channel in Asia. It was first available in South Korea in February, and in Japan in December. The channel launched in Singapore on January 19, 2007. On April 1, 2010, Discovery HD was rebranded to Discovery HD World. In 2008, Discovery Channel HD was launched in Japan. In February 2010, Discovery HD World India was launched with dubbed programming in Hindi and Tamil.

== Programming ==
- Acopan Tepui
- Against the Elements
- American Loggers
- At Sea
- Baltic Coast
- Chasing Classics Cars
- Classic Autos: Paris Auction
- Disappeared
- Discovery Atlas
- Earth Diaries
- Faces of a Vanishing World
- Fantastic Festivals Of The World
- Fight Quest
- Fish Life
- Getaway to Africa
- Great Lodges... National Parks
- The Greatest Auto Race On Earth
- Green Paradise
- Hotels
- I Have Seen the Earth Change
- An Inside Look
- King of Construction
- Laura McKenzie's Traveler
- Lost City in the Sky
- Mighty Ships
- Mixer Season
- Mysterious Journeys
- My Cypriot Kitchen
- Nature's Keepers
- On The Run
- Orangutan Island
- Prototype This!
- Really Big Things With Matt Rogers
- Rhythm & Blooms
- Sarah Palin's Alaska
- Secret Creatures of Jao
- Splash of Color
- Star Racer
- Stunt Stars
- Suggs' Italian Job
- Sunrise Earth
- Three Sheets
- Ultimate Journeys
- Unique Hotels and Restaurants
- Unusual World
- Water Life
- Weird Creatures
- The World From Above

== See also ==
- Animal Planet
- Discovery Channel
- Discovery Home & Health
- Discovery Science
- TLC
- Discovery Turbo
